= Doctor Who season 4 =

1966–67 season of British sci-fi TV series

Doctor Who
- Season 4
- Cover art of the soundtrack release for first serial of the season
- Starring: William Hartnell; Anneke Wills; Michael Craze; Patrick Troughton; Frazer Hines; Deborah Watling
- No. of stories: 9
- No. of episodes: 43 (33 missing)

Release
- Original network: BBC1
- Original release: 10 September 1966 – 1 July 1967

Season chronology
- ← Previous; Season 3 Next → Season 5

The fourth season of the British science fiction television series Doctor Who began on 10 September 1966 with the First Doctor (William Hartnell) story The Smugglers and, after a change of lead actor (Patrick Troughton) part-way through the series, ended on 1 July 1967 with The Evil of the Daleks. For the first time, the entire main cast changed over the course of a single season (the only other occasions this has happened are during Season 18 and Season 21).

Only 10 out of 43 episodes survive in the BBC archives; 33 remain missing. No serials in this season exist in their entirety. However, The Tenth Planet, The Power of the Daleks, The Underwater Menace, The Moonbase, The Macra Terror, The Faceless Ones and The Evil of the Daleks have currently had their missing episodes (twenty five in total) reconstructed with animation and subsequently have been released on home media.

== Casting ==
=== Main cast ===
- William Hartnell as the First Doctor
- Anneke Wills as Polly
- Michael Craze as Ben Jackson
- Patrick Troughton as the Second Doctor
- Frazer Hines as Jamie McCrimmon
- Deborah Watling as Victoria Waterfield

William Hartnell appears as the First Doctor for the first two full serials before being succeeded in the role by Patrick Troughton as the Second Doctor for the remaining seven stories.

Anneke Wills and Michael Craze continue their roles as Polly and Ben respectively. They are shortly joined by Frazer Hines playing Jamie McCrimmon in The Highlanders. Polly and Ben depart in the penultimate story The Faceless Ones, and at the end of the season Deborah Watling makes her debut as Victoria Waterfield in The Evil of the Daleks.

== Serials ==
Season 4 was produced by Innes Lloyd. Gerry Davis served as Script Editor, apart from the final four episodes of The Evil of the Daleks. Peter Bryant joined as associate producer for The Faceless Ones, and replaced Gerry Davis as script editor for the last four episodes of the season.

The Smugglers was the final serial to be produced during the third production block, but was held over to the start of Season 4.

The Tenth Planet introduced the Cybermen and the concept of Regeneration, which wouldn't be named so until Planet of the Spiders in 1974.

The Power of the Daleks was the first Dalek story to use the traditional ...of the Daleks title form. Of the nine subsequent Dalek serials, only Death to the Daleks from Season 11 was not named in this way. The naming convention for Dalek stories was first used in the revived series with "Evolution of the Daleks" in Series 3.

None of the nine serials from Season 4 are complete in the BBC archive, with four (The Smugglers, The Power of the Daleks, The Highlanders and The Macra Terror) each having all of their episodes missing; of the total of 43 episodes between "Episode 1" of The Smugglers and "Episode 7" of The Evil of the Daleks, only 10 are currently in the BBC archive. The most complete serial of the season, The Tenth Planet, is missing only its last episode; this serial, as well as The Power of the Daleks, The Underwater Menace, The Moonbase, The Macra Terror, The Faceless Ones and The Evil of the Daleks have had their missing elements recreated with animated episodes using the original soundtrack. The fully animated serials are presented in both colour and black and white formats, while The Tenth Planet and The Moonbase animations are presented exclusively in black and white.

| No. story | No. in season | Serial title | Episode titles | Directed by | Written by | Original release date | Prod. code | UK viewers (millions) | AI |
|---|---|---|---|---|---|---|---|---|---|
| 28 | 1 | The Smugglers | "Episode 1"^{†} | Julia Smith | Brian Hayles | 10 September 1966 | CC | 4.3 | 47 |
| 28 | 1 | The Smugglers | "Episode 2"^{†} | Julia Smith | Brian Hayles | 17 September 1966 | CC | 4.9 | 45 |
| 28 | 1 | The Smugglers | "Episode 3"^{†} | Julia Smith | Brian Hayles | 24 September 1966 | CC | 4.2 | 43 |
| 28 | 1 | The Smugglers | "Episode 4"^{†} | Julia Smith | Brian Hayles | 1 October 1966 | CC | 4.5 | 43 |
The Doctor’s new companions Ben and Polly arrive with him in the TARDIS on the coast of seventeenth-century Cornwall, where a group of pirates are searching for treasure.
| 29 | 2 | The Tenth Planet | "Episode 1" | Derek Martinus | Kit Pedler | 8 October 1966 | DD | 5.5 | 50 |
| 29 | 2 | The Tenth Planet | "Episode 2" | Derek Martinus | Kit Pedler | 15 October 1966 | DD | 6.4 | 48 |
| 29 | 2 | The Tenth Planet | "Episode 3" | Derek Martinus | Kit Pedler and Gerry Davis | 22 October 1966 | DD | 7.6 | 48 |
| 29 | 2 | The Tenth Planet | "Episode 4"^{†} | Derek Martinus | Kit Pedler and Gerry Davis | 29 October 1966 | DD | 7.5 | 47 |
The TARDIS crew arrive at the South Pole in the year 1986, near a South Pole tracking base. Soon afterwards, hostile cyborgs from Earth's twin planet Mondas, known as Cybermen, quickly take over the base, planning to convert every human being into Cybermen like themselves while the Doctor's old body is wearing a little bit thin.
| 30 | 3 | The Power of the Daleks | "Episode One"^{†} | Christopher Barry | David Whitaker and Dennis Spooner (uncredited) | 5 November 1966 | EE | 7.9 | 43 |
| 30 | 3 | The Power of the Daleks | "Episode Two"^{†} | Christopher Barry | David Whitaker and Dennis Spooner (uncredited) | 12 November 1966 | EE | 7.8 | 45 |
| 30 | 3 | The Power of the Daleks | "Episode Three"^{†} | Christopher Barry | David Whitaker and Dennis Spooner (uncredited) | 19 November 1966 | EE | 7.5 | 44 |
| 30 | 3 | The Power of the Daleks | "Episode Four"^{†} | Christopher Barry | David Whitaker and Dennis Spooner (uncredited) | 26 November 1966 | EE | 7.8 | 47 |
| 30 | 3 | The Power of the Daleks | "Episode Five"^{†} | Christopher Barry | David Whitaker and Dennis Spooner (uncredited) | 3 December 1966 | EE | 8.0 | 48 |
| 30 | 3 | The Power of the Daleks | "Episode Six"^{†} | Christopher Barry | David Whitaker and Dennis Spooner (uncredited) | 10 December 1966 | EE | 7.8 | 47 |
The newly regenerated Doctor, Ben and Polly soon arrive on the planet Vulcan, a human colony. There, the Doctor finds the humans claiming that the Daleks are their servants. But a more sinister plan is behind the Daleks.
| 31 | 4 | The Highlanders | "Episode 1"^{†} | Hugh David | Elwyn Jones and Gerry Davis | 17 December 1966 | FF | 6.7 | 47 |
| 31 | 4 | The Highlanders | "Episode 2"^{†} | Hugh David | Elwyn Jones and Gerry Davis | 24 December 1966 | FF | 6.8 | 46 |
| 31 | 4 | The Highlanders | "Episode 3"^{†} | Hugh David | Elwyn Jones and Gerry Davis | 31 December 1966 | FF | 7.4 | 47 |
| 31 | 4 | The Highlanders | "Episode 4"^{†} | Hugh David | Elwyn Jones and Gerry Davis | 7 January 1967 | FF | 7.3 | 47 |
The TARDIS arrives after the Battle of Culloden in 1746, where the TARDIS crew encounter the McLaren Clan and their piper, Jamie McCrimmon. They learn of a plan to sell defeated Scots rebels into slavery.
| 32 | 5 | The Underwater Menace | "Episode 1"^{†} | Julia Smith | Geoffrey Orme | 14 January 1967 | GG | 8.3 | 48 |
| 32 | 5 | The Underwater Menace | "Episode 2" | Julia Smith | Geoffrey Orme | 21 January 1967 | GG | 7.5 | 46 |
| 32 | 5 | The Underwater Menace | "Episode 3" | Julia Smith | Geoffrey Orme | 28 January 1967 | GG | 7.1 | 45 |
| 32 | 5 | The Underwater Menace | "Episode 4"^{†} | Julia Smith | Geoffrey Orme | 4 February 1967 | GG | 7.0 | 47 |
The TARDIS lands on a deserted volcanic island. The Doctor, Ben, Polly and Jamie are captured and taken in a lift down a shaft below the seabed, There they realise they are prisoners of the survivors of Atlantis, and that their High Priest, Lolem, declares they are to be sacrificed to the great god Amdo. Professor Zaroff arrives and has a plan to raise Atlantis from the sea.
| 33 | 6 | The Moonbase | "Episode 1"^{†} | Morris Barry | Kit Pedler | 11 February 1967 | HH | 8.1 | 50 |
| 33 | 6 | The Moonbase | "Episode 2" | Morris Barry | Kit Pedler | 18 February 1967 | HH | 8.9 | 49 |
| 33 | 6 | The Moonbase | "Episode 3"^{†} | Morris Barry | Kit Pedler | 25 February 1967 | HH | 8.2 | 53 |
| 33 | 6 | The Moonbase | "Episode 4" | Morris Barry | Kit Pedler | 4 March 1967 | HH | 8.1 | 58 |
The TARDIS makes a bumpy landing on the Moon in the year 2070. When the TARDIS crew venture outside, they find a moonbase. Suddenly on the base, people start becoming seriously ill with symptoms of fever and delirium. The Doctor realises that their old enemies, the Cybermen, are stalking the moonbase and taking the patients' bodies. The leader of the moonbase gives the Doctor 24 hours to discover the cause of the virus, or else he leaves the Moon.
| 34 | 7 | The Macra Terror | "Episode 1"^{†} | John Davies | Ian Stuart Black | 11 March 1967 | JJ | 8.0 | 50 |
| 34 | 7 | The Macra Terror | "Episode 2"^{†} | John Davies | Ian Stuart Black | 18 March 1967 | JJ | 7.9 | 48 |
| 34 | 7 | The Macra Terror | "Episode 3"^{†} | John Davies | Ian Stuart Black | 25 March 1967 | JJ | 8.5 | 52 |
| 34 | 7 | The Macra Terror | "Episode 4"^{†} | John Davies | Ian Stuart Black | 1 April 1967 | JJ | 8.4 | 49 |
The Doctor and his companions arrive at a planet in Earth's colonial future, where they discover that the inhabitants are being menaced by giant crabs called the Macra.
| 35 | 8 | The Faceless Ones | "Episode 1" | Gerry Mill | David Ellis and Malcolm Hulke | 8 April 1967 | KK | 8.0 | 51 |
| 35 | 8 | The Faceless Ones | "Episode 2"^{†} | Gerry Mill | David Ellis and Malcolm Hulke | 15 April 1967 | KK | 6.4 | 50 |
| 35 | 8 | The Faceless Ones | "Episode 3" | Gerry Mill | David Ellis and Malcolm Hulke | 22 April 1967 | KK | 7.9 | 53 |
| 35 | 8 | The Faceless Ones | "Episode 4"^{†} | Gerry Mill | David Ellis and Malcolm Hulke | 29 April 1967 | KK | 6.9 | 55 |
| 35 | 8 | The Faceless Ones | "Episode 5"^{†} | Gerry Mill | David Ellis and Malcolm Hulke | 6 May 1967 | KK | 7.1 | 55 |
| 35 | 8 | The Faceless Ones | "Episode 6"^{†} | Gerry Mill | David Ellis and Malcolm Hulke | 13 May 1967 | KK | 8.0 | 52 |
After the TARDIS lands on the runway at Gatwick Airport, Polly witnesses a murder, leading the Doctor to find out that aliens are stealing the identities of travellers.
| 36 | 9 | The Evil of the Daleks | "Episode 1"^{†} | Derek Martinus | David Whitaker | 20 May 1967 | LL | 8.1 | 51 |
| 36 | 9 | The Evil of the Daleks | "Episode 2" | Derek Martinus | David Whitaker | 27 May 1967 | LL | 7.5 | 51 |
| 36 | 9 | The Evil of the Daleks | "Episode 3"^{†} | Derek Martinus | David Whitaker | 3 June 1967 | LL | 6.1 | 52 |
| 36 | 9 | The Evil of the Daleks | "Episode 4"^{†} | Derek Martinus | David Whitaker | 10 June 1967 | LL | 5.3 | 51 |
| 36 | 9 | The Evil of the Daleks | "Episode 5"^{†} | Derek Martinus | David Whitaker | 17 June 1967 | LL | 5.1 | 53 |
| 36 | 9 | The Evil of the Daleks | "Episode 6"^{†} | Derek Martinus | David Whitaker | 24 June 1967 | LL | 6.8 | 49 |
| 36 | 9 | The Evil of the Daleks | "Episode 7"^{†} | Derek Martinus | David Whitaker | 1 July 1967 | LL | 6.1 | 56 |
While trying to retrieve the TARDIS, the Doctor and Jamie are transported back in time to the 19th century by a professor working for the Daleks; the Daleks aim to use the Doctor's knowledge to give the Daleks human intelligence, but the plan backfires spectacularly.

^†: Episode is missing

== Broadcast ==
The entire season was broadcast from 10 September 1966 to 1 July 1967.

== Production ==
Title card as used in this season from The Macra Terror to The Evil of the Daleks

During this season the title card for the series was changed for the first time, starting with The Macra Terror. A new theme arrangement would debut in the following serial, The Faceless Ones.

Season 4 was the first in which the Doctor's face appeared during the opening titles, starting with The Macra Terror. This practice would be consistently maintained until the end of Season 26 in 1989.

=== Scrapped stories ===
A number of stories were proposed for this season and scrapped. Brian Hayles proposed two serials, The Hounds of Time and The Nazis, with the latter being scrapped in favour of The Smugglers while the former was written around the time of that serial's completion and ultimately scrapped. Roger Dixon proposed numerous storylines, such as The Ants, where the Doctor and his companions are shrunken to a small size and fight super-intelligent ants bent on taking over the Earth, The New Machines, where a race of robots create a new race of people after the former race died, but fear the new people will oppress them, The Return of the Neanderthal, in which the Doctor encounters descendants of the Neanderthals who want to return to Earth in 2016, The Sleepwalkers, which depicts the TARDIS crew arriving on a far-future Earth where a community of youths are dependent on unseen Elders, and a storyline named Twin World. Barry Letts pitched two storylines, one titled The Mutant, which would have involved a race of beings undergoing a butterfly-like cycle of mutations, and an untitled storyline about a sinister organisation operating on Earth as an amusement park. William Emms pitched The Imps, planned to be the fourth serial of the season, which would have seen a spaceship overrun by imp-like aliens. Due to a number of rewrites needed to accommodate the season's changing main cast, as well as due to Emms' illness, the story was dropped. David Ellis and Malcolm Hulke pitched a story titled The Big Store, which was to be about faceless aliens infiltrating department stores as display mannequins. Though scrapped, Ellis and Hulke reused elements of the plot in The Faceless Ones. Other scrapped stories include The Ocean Liner by Ellis and The People Who Couldn't Remember by Ellis and Hulke, which was scrapped due to script editor Gerry Davis wishing to avoid the comic tone of the poorly-received The Gunfighters.

== Missing episodes ==
Season 4 is notable for being the only season of Doctor Who from which not a single complete serial survives. The missing episodes are:

- The Smugglers – All 4 episodes
- The Tenth Planet – Episode 4 (of 4 total) (Animated recreation exists)
- The Power of the Daleks – All 6 episodes (Animated recreations exist)
- The Highlanders – All 4 episodes
- The Underwater Menace – Episodes 1 & 4 (of 4 total) (Animated recreations exist)
- The Moonbase – Episodes 1 & 3 (of 4 total) (Animated recreations exist)
- The Macra Terror – All 4 episodes (Animated recreations exist)
- The Faceless Ones – Episodes 2, 4, 5 & 6 (of 6 total) (Animated recreations exist)
- The Evil of the Daleks – Episodes 1, 3 to 7 (of 7 total) (Animated recreations exist)

== Home media ==
=== VHS releases ===
| Season | Story no. | Serial name | Duration | Release date | | |
| Season | Story no. | Serial name | Duration | UK | Australia | USA / Canada |
|---|---|---|---|---|---|---|
| 4 | 29 | The Tenth Planet | 4 × 25 min. | 6 November 2000 | November 2000 | May 2001 |
| 4 | 32 | The Underwater Menace (Note: Episode 3) (Note: Includes The Missing Years) | 1 × 25 min. | November 1998 | December 1998 | February 2001 |
| 4 | 33 | Cybermen: The Early Years; The Moonbase (Note: Episodes 2 & 4) | 4 × 25 min. | 6 July 1992 | March 1993 | 10 March 1993 |
| 4 | 35 | The Reign of Terror Set; The Faceless Ones (Note: Episodes 1 & 3) | 2 × 25 min. | 24 November 2003 | December 2003 | 7 October 2003 |
| 4 | 36 | Daleks: The Early Years; The Evil of the Daleks (Note: Episode 2) | 1 × 25 min. | 6 July 1992 | February 1993 | October 1993 |

=== DVD and Blu-ray releases ===
All releases are for DVD unless otherwise indicated:

- ^{(D,B)} indicates a simultaneous DVD and Blu-ray release

| Season | Story no. | Serial name | Duration | Release date | | |
| Season | Story no. | Serial name | Duration | R2 / UK | R4 / AU | R1 / US |
|---|---|---|---|---|---|---|
| 4 | 29 | The Tenth Planet (Note: Episodes 1–3 of 4, with both animated and "telesnap" reconstructions of episode 4) | 4 × 25 min. | 24 June 2013 (Note: Released as part of the Regeneration boxset); 14 October 2013 (Note: The Region 2 release of The Tenth Planet was released in advance as part of the Regeneration box set without special features, and was later re-released on its own with special features.) | 30 October 2013 | 19 November 2013 |
| 4 | 30 | The Power of the Daleks (Note: All six episodes animated) | 6 × 25 min. | 21 November 2016 | 14 December 2016; 22 February 2017 (Note: Colour edition) | 24 January 2017 |
| 4 | 30 | The Power of the Daleks (Special Edition) (Note: All six episodes animated) | 6 × 25 min. | 27 July 2020^{(D,B)} | 26 August 2020 | —N/a |
| 4 | 32 | The Underwater Menace (Note: Episodes 2 and 3 of 4, with "tele-snap" reconstructions of episodes 1 and 4) | 4 × 25 min. | 26 October 2015 | 2 December 2015 | 24 May 2016 |
| 4 | 32 | The Underwater Menace (Special Edition) (Note: All four episodes animated (colour and black and white versions), remastered Episode 2 & 3 and "tele-snap" reconstructions of Episodes 1 and 4) | 4 × 25 min. | 13 November 2023^{(D,B)} | 16 April 2025^{(D,B)} | 9 January 2024^{(B)} |
| 4 | 32, 33, 35, 36 | Lost in Time, Volume 2 The Underwater Menace (Note: Episode 3 of 4); The Moonbase (Note: Episodes 2 and 4 of 4; soundtracks of 1 and 3); The Faceless Ones (Note: Episodes 1 and 3 of 6); The Evil of the Daleks (Note: Episode 2 of 7) | 6 × 25 min. | 1 November 2004 (Note: Re-released in slimmer packaging in late 2016) | 2 December 2004 (Note: Re-released in slimmer packaging in July 2010) | 2 November 2004 |
| 4 | 33 | The Moonbase (Note: Episodes 2 and 4 of 4, animation of 1 and 3) | 4 × 25 min. | 20 January 2014 | 22 January 2014 | 11 February 2014 |
| 4 | 34 | The Macra Terror (Note: All four episodes animated (colour and black and white versions) and "tele-snap" reconstruction) | 4 × 25 min. | 25 March 2019^{(D,B)} | 17 April 2019^{(D,B)} | 12 November 2019 |
| 4 | 35 | The Faceless Ones (Note: Animation of all six episodes (in Colour and Black and White), surviving episodes 1 & 3 and "tele-snap" reconstructions of 2 & 4-6) | 6 × 25 min. | 16 March 2020^{(D,B)} | 8 April 2020 | 20 October 2020 |
| 4 | 36 | The Evil of the Daleks (Note: Animation of all six episodes (in Colour and Black and White), surviving episode 2 remastered and "tele-snap" reconstructions of 1, & 3-7) | 7 × 25 min. | 27 September 2021^{(D,B)} | 10 November 2021 | 16 November 2021 |

== In print ==
| Season | Story no. | Library no. (Note: Number in Target's Doctor Who Library, if applicable) | Novelisation title | Author | Hardcover release date (Note: Published by Target's parent companies (Allen Wingate, W. H. Allen, BBC Books) unless otherwise indicated) | Paperback release date (Note: Published by Target Books (or by BBC Books under the Target Collection umbrella) unless otherwise indicated) | Audiobook | |
| Season | Story no. | Library no. | Novelisation title | Author | Hardcover release date | Paperback release date | Release date (Note: Unabridged from BBC Audio / AudioGo unless otherwise indicated) | Narrator |
|---|---|---|---|---|---|---|---|---|
| 4 | 028 | 133 | The Smugglers | Terrance Dicks | 16 June 1988 | 17 November 1988 | 6 August 2020 | Anneke Wills |
| 4 | 029 | 62 | Doctor Who and the Tenth Planet | Gerry Davis | 19 February 1976 | | 7 December 2017 | Anneke Wills (Note: Cyberman voices performed by Nicholas Briggs) |
| 4 | 030 | 154 | The Power of the Daleks | John Peel | —N/a | 15 July 1993 | 3 November 2022 | Nicholas Briggs |
| 4 | 031 | 90 | The Highlanders | Gerry Davis | 16 August 1984 | 15 November 1984 | 6 September 2012 | Anneke Wills |
| 4 | 032 | 129 | The Underwater Menace | Nigel Robinson | 18 February 1988 | 21 July 1988 | 2 December 2021 | Anneke Wills |
| 4 | 033 | 14 | Doctor Who and the Cybermen | Gerry Davis | 16 July 1981 | 20 February 1975 | 12 March 2009 | Anneke Wills |
| 4 | 034 | 123 | The Macra Terror | Ian Stuart Black | 16 July 1987 | 10 December 1987 | 4 August 2016 | Anneke Wills |
| 4 | 035 | 116 | The Faceless Ones | Terrance Dicks | 11 December 1986 | 21 May 1987 | 2 May 2019 | Anneke Wills |
| 4 | 036 | 155 | The Evil of the Daleks | John Peel | —N/a | 19 August 1993 | —N/a | |
| 4 | 036 | —N/a | The Evil of the Daleks (unabridged) (Note: This adaptation follows the Doctor showing Zoe the story at the end of The Wheel in Space.) | Frazer Hines (with Mike Tucker and Steve Cole) | 26 October 2023 | —N/a | 26 October 2023 | Frazer Hines (Note: Dalek voices performed by Nicholas Briggs) |
| 4 | 036 | —N/a | The Evil of the Daleks (abridged) | Frazer Hines (with Mike Tucker and Steve Cole) | —N/a | 10 October 2024 (Note: Released exclusively with Doctor Who Magazine #609) | —N/a | |

== See also ==
- List of Doctor Who episodes (1963–1989)

== Bibliography ==
- Ainsworth, John, ed. (2019). "Shada, Dimensions in Time, The Curse of Fatal Death and Time Crash". Doctor Who: The Complete History. 90 (90). London: Panini Comics, Hachette Partworks. ISSN 2057-6048.
- Smith, Paul (2014). The Classic Doctor Who DVD Compendium. United Kingdom: Wonderful Books. ISBN 978-0-9576062-2-7.
- Smith, Paul MC (July 2021). Based on the Popular BBC Television Serial. Wonderful Books.
- Pixley, Andrew (2003d). Hickman, Clayton (ed.). "Good Vibrations". Doctor Who Magazine. No. Special Edition 4 (published 4 June 2003)..
- Bignell, Richard, ed. (2012). "Hayles Storm". Nothing at the End of the Lane. No. 3 (published January 2012)..
- Howe, David J.; Stammers, Mark; Walker, Stephen James (1992). Doctor Who – The Sixties. London: Virgin Press. ISBN 1-85227-420-4..
