= The Moonbase =

033 – The Moonbase
- Doctor Who serial
- An army of Cybermen advance on the titular moonbase, in a promotional photo for the serial. The sequence has been named one of the greatest cliffhangers in the series.

Cast
- Doctor: Patrick Troughton – Second Doctor
- Companions: Michael Craze – Ben; Anneke Wills – Polly; Frazer Hines – Jamie
- Others: Patrick Barr – Hobson; André Maranne – Benoit; Michael Wolf – Nils; John Rolfe – Sam; Alan Rowe – Dr. Evans / Voice from Space Control; Mark Heath – Ralph; Barry Ashton, Derek Calder, Arnold Chazen, Leon Maybank, Victor Pemberton, Edward Phillips, Ron Pinnell, Robin Scott, Alan Wells – Scientists; Sonnie Willis, John Wills, Peter Greene, Keith Goodman, Reg Whitehead – Cybermen; Denis McCarthy – Voice of Controller Rinberg; Peter Hawkins – Cybermen Voices

Production
- Directed by: Morris Barry
- Written by: Kit Pedler
- Script editor: Gerry Davis
- Produced by: Innes Lloyd
- Music by: None (Note: Music used in this serial is stock music composed by Eric Siday, Desmond Briscoe, Roberto Gerhard, Martin Slavin, Trevor Duncan, Desmond Leslie, and Eric Nordgren along with cues by Tristram Cary originally composed for The Daleks' Master Plan)
- Production code: HH
- Series: Season 4
- Running time: 4 episodes, 25 minutes each
- Episode(s) missing: 2 episodes (1 and 3)
- First broadcast: 11 February 1967
- Last broadcast: 4 March 1967

Chronology
| ← Preceded by The Underwater Menace | Followed by → The Macra Terror |

The Moonbase is the half-missing sixth serial of the fourth season of the British science fiction television series Doctor Who, which was first broadcast on BBC1 in four weekly parts from 11 February to 4 March 1967.

In this serial, the Second Doctor (Patrick Troughton) and his travelling companions Ben (Michael Craze), Polly (Anneke Wills) and Jamie McCrimmon (Frazer Hines) arrive on the Human colonised Moon in 2070, where the Cybermen plot to take over the base and use it to invade the Earth. This story features the return, and first redesign, of the Cybermen, after their popularity in The Tenth Planet earlier in the season.

The serial showed an improvement in ratings for Doctor Who, with an average of 8.3 million viewers. The serial has received positive reviews from critics, with most preferring the Cybermen's first outing, but praise for Troughton’s performance as the Doctor. The Moonbase proved sufficiently popular for a third Cybermen story to be commissioned. In 2014, The Moonbase was released with animated reconstructions of its two missing episodes.

== Plot ==
The Second Doctor and his companions Ben, Polly and Jamie land on the Moon in the year 2070. Jamie is injured, and workers from the nearby Moonbase arrive to treat him. The Doctor, Ben, and Polly arrive at the Moonbase, where they learn that the Moonbase uses a machine called the Graviton to track and manage weather on Earth. Members of the Moonbase's crew have begun to collapse under the influence of an unknown pathogen.

The Moonbase is quarantined, and the Doctor starts to investigate. Crew members begin to die and disappear, and in the sickbay, a feverish Jamie begins to rant about a "Phantom Piper", a figure said to appear to a McCrimmon before death. Polly later spots the figure as it leaves, recognizing the figure as a Cyberman. Crewmember Hobson believes the Cybermen died out years ago and asks the Doctor to find a cure to the pathogen in twenty-four hours or else they will be forced to leave.

The Moonbase's Gravitron begins to malfunction due to a broken antennae on the lunar surface. The Cybermen beat crew members sent to fix the antennae to death. The Doctor discovers the pathogen was spread through infected sugar as a Cyberman disguised as a patient reveals itself. The Cybermen recognize the Doctor and use their weapons to capture him and his allies. They reveal that they intend to use the Gravitron to destroy all life on Earth.

Polly devises a solution that dissolves the plastic in the Cybermen's chest units. Alongside Ben and Jamie, the three lead a revolt against the Cybermen. As the crew members begin to fight back against the Cybermen, a large army of them begin to advance upon the Moonbase. The Cybermen attempt to blast their way inside using a large laser cannon, though the laser is deflected by the Gravitron. With the help of Hobson, Polly, and another crew member, the Doctor is able to point the Gravitron at the lunar surface, blasting the Cybermen and their ships back into space.

As Hobson and his team reorient the Gravitron to its proper use, the Doctor and his companions slip away. Back in the TARDIS, they dematerialise and activate the time scanner, revealing a monstrous claw waving around.

== Production ==
=== Writing and design ===
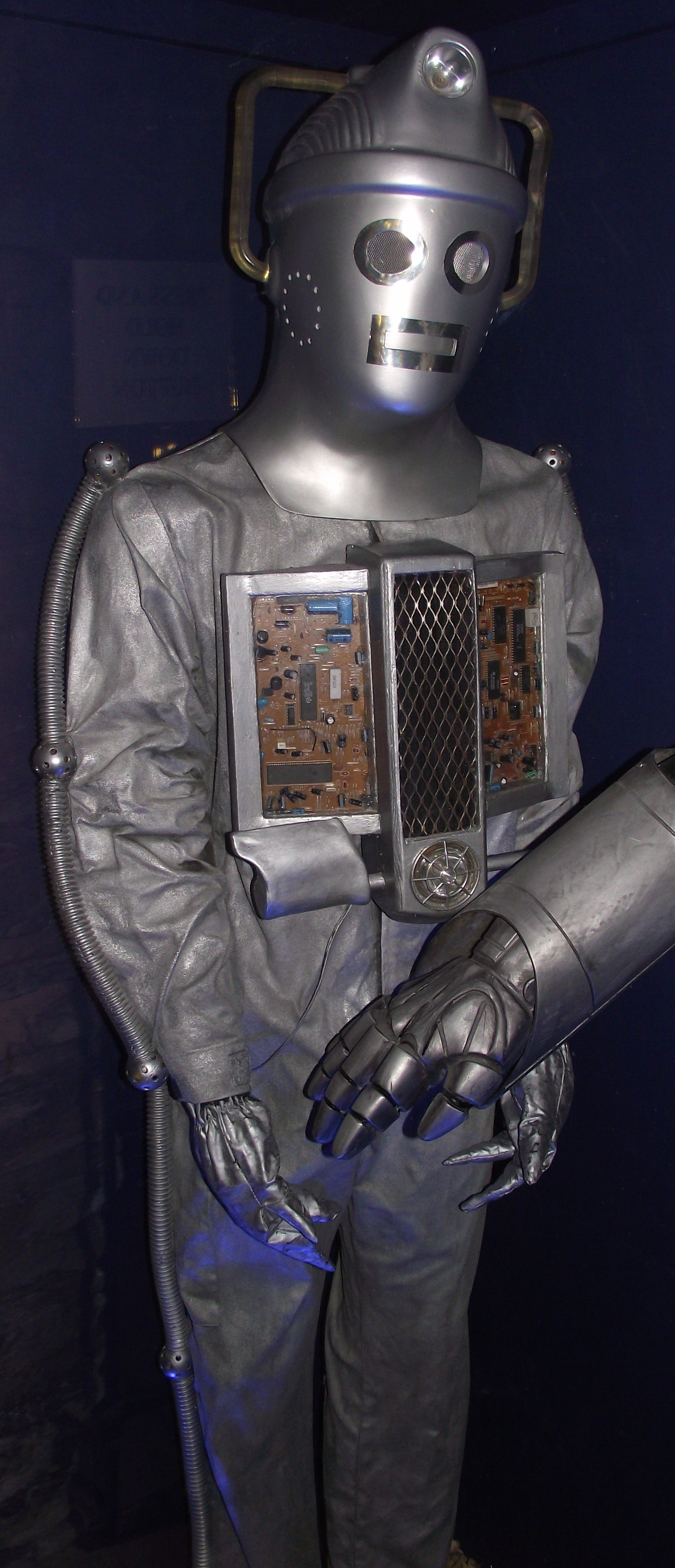
The redesigned Cybermen, on display at a Doctor Who exhibition

The Moonbase is the second story to feature the Cybermen after The Tenth Planet (1966) earlier in the season. Due to the success of The Tenth Planet, producer Innes Lloyd hoped they could be the new returning foes replacing the Daleks, began discussing the return of the Cybermen with their creator Kit Pedler during the month The Tenth Planet was airing. The serial was commissioned on 18 November 1966 as Dr Who and the Return of the Cybermen, with Davis as a co-writer to help develop Pedler's ideas, as Pedler was not experienced at TV writing. To be mindful of costs while still preserving spectacle, script editor Gerry Davis asked for a story developed around one large set. Pedler was inspired by the Space Race. The first three episodes' scripts were delivered 23 December 1966.

After the serial was commissioned, a late decision was made for Jamie (Frazer Hines) to be a regular cast member; Pedler adapted to this by having Jamie be unconscious during half of the serial, and Davis improved Jamie's role at the editing stage. Meanwhile, director Morris Barry wanted Troughton to act less like a clown and the costume's baggy trousers were taken in; the character also lost his hat as recommended by a BBC Drama executive. The Cybermen's costumes and appearance was changed to look more robotic from those in The Tenth Planet, which could be cumbersome. Eleven costumes were made. The Cybermen's voices also changed to match their new appearance. A device with a dental palate with a small loudspeaker that vibrated to create a voice was used. Peter Hawkins, the voice actor for the Cybermen, found this uncomfortable as the vibration gave him nausea and headaches.

=== Filming ===
Pre-filming, consisting of the lunar surface scenes, took place at Ealing Studios on 17 January. The regular actors were released from rehearsals for "Episode 3" of The Underwater Menace to film. An overcranked camera was used to create the effect of lower gravity. Scenes with guest stars and the Cybermen were shot 18 January, and the Cybermen shots on the lunar landscape were shot 19 January. Model filming and final pre-filming sequences were shot 20 January. Rehearsals began 31 January. Filming began 4 February. The first three episodes were recorded on successive Saturdays at Doctor Who's then regular home of Riverside 1, but for "Episode 4" it moved back to Lime Grove D.

To conserve budget, music and cues from the BBC's library were used in the serial, including from former Doctor Who episodes. The serial is the last to use the original title sequence that had been in use since the first episode.

=== Casting ===
Peter Hawkins returned to voice the Cybermen. John Levene has an uncredited role as a Cyberman. Levene would return as a Yeti in The Web of Fear (1968), and would go on to play the regular character Sergeant Benton. John Rolfe had previously appeared in The War Machines (1966) and would appear again in The Green Death (1973). Alan Rowe was cast as Doctor Evans, an early victim of the space plague and also provided the voice of Space Control. He later appeared in The Time Warrior (1974), Horror of Fang Rock (1977) and Full Circle (1980). Victor Pemberton, who played Jules, later wrote the 1968 serial Fury from the Deep.

== Broadcast and reception ==
| Episode | Title | Run time | Original release date | UK viewers (millions) | Appreciation Index |
|---|---|---|---|---|---|
| 1 | "Episode 1"^{†} | 24:12 | 11 February 1967 | 8.1 | 50 |
| 2 | "Episode 2" | 24:42 | 18 February 1967 | 8.9 | 49 |
| 3 | "Episode 3"^{†} | 26:11 | 25 February 1967 | 8.2 | 53 |
| 4 | "Episode 4" | 23:28 | 4 March 1967 | 8.1 | 58 |

^† Episode is missing

The Moonbase was broadcast on BBC1 in four weekly parts from 11 February to 4 March 1967. The serial was an improvement in ratings for Doctor Who; "Episode 2" with 8.9 million viewers was the highest in over a year, and "Episode 4" had the highest Appreciation Index in two years at 58 out of 100. The serial was sold internationally to Australia, New Zealand, Uganda, Hong Kong, Singapore, and Zambia.

Clearance was given for the original tapes to be wiped in 1969, although the second and fourth episodes remained in the archives as film copies.

=== Reception ===
Ann Lawrence of Morning Star reviewed the first two episodes on 22 February 1967, describing the story as better than some recent serials. However, she wanted less screaming from Polly.

Paul Cornell, Martin Day, and Keith Topping gave the serial an unfavourable review in The Discontinuity Guide (1995), writing that it was "illogical and boring, reducing the Cybermen to the role of intergalactic gangsters". In The Television Companion (1998), David J. Howe and Stephen James Walker noted that it was a remake of The Tenth Planet but was "far superior" in the way the Cybermen were portrayed. They also praised the music, acting, and the shots on the Moon, but they felt the direction was "lacklustre" in places and called the shots of the Cyberman ship landing "amongst the worst ever seen in Doctor Who". In 2009, Patrick Mulkern of Radio Times also praised the redesigned Cybermen and the atmosphere. He wrote that the scripts "impart dollops of science without jarring and allow for a good deal of incident and suspense". The A.V. Club's Christopher Bahn said in 2014, "Whatever flaws it may have, and it's far from perfect, "The Moonbase" has more than enough going for it to earn a place as one of the must-see serials of the Second Doctor era." In Starburst, Paul Mount described The Moonbase as "pretty much the same story as 'The Tenth Planet', differing only to the extent that it's not quite as good." Still, he said it is "cheerful" and "occasionally competent." James Hoare of SciFiNow gave the DVD release three out of five stars, describing the story as "a slightly dull and weakly padded retread of The Tenth Planet" but praising Troughton's performance. In 2010, SFX named the resolution of patching the hole in the Moonbase with a drinks tray as one of the silliest moments in Doctor Who's history.

=== Legacy ===
The reception to The Moonbase led directly to a return of the Cybermen; on 3 March 1967, script editor Gerry Davis commissioned Pedler to write what would become The Tomb of the Cybermen (1967).

In the Doctor Who Magazine poll in 2014 of the first 50 years of the programme, The Moonbase came in 20th for the 1960s stories and 113th overall (out of 241), similar to its ranking of 112 in the 2009 poll. In the Doctor Who Magazine poll for the show's 60th anniversary in 2023, The Moonbase was voted the eleventh best story of the Second Doctor's tenure, out of a total of 21. In a 2010 article, Charlie Jane Anders of io9 listed the cliffhanger to the third episode—in which the Cybermen march across the Moon's surface towards the base—as one of the greatest cliffhangers in the history of Doctor Who. She ranked the serial the 35th best Doctor Who story of all time and a "classic" in 2015.

== Commercial releases ==
=== In print ===
Doctor Who and the Cybermen
- Author: Gerry Davis
- Cover artist: Chris Achilleos
- Series: Doctor Who book: Target novelisations
- Release number: 14
- Publisher: Target Books
- Publication date: 20 February 1975
- ISBN: 0-426-10575-3

A novelisation of this serial written by Gerry Davis was published by Target Books in February 1975 under the title Doctor Who and the Cybermen. The cover for the original publication used the design of the Cybermen from The Invasion. It was reprinted in hardcover with a new cover in 1981. An audiobook read by Anneke Wills with the Cyberman voices by Nicholas Briggs was released by the BBC in March 2009. The novelisation was reissued by BBC Books in July 2011 with a foreword by Gareth Roberts.

=== Home media ===
In July 1992, episodes 2 and 4 of this story were released on VHS as part of the video Cybermen – The Early Years. In November 2004, they were included in the Lost in Time DVD set. The full audio of the serial, accompanied by linking narration from Frazer Hines, was released on CD in 2001 and is also available for MP3 download.

This serial was set to be released on DVD in October 2013, with episodes 1 and 3 represented by new animation from Planet 55 Studios, but it was not released until 20 January 2014. Paul Mount of Starburst described the animation as "a decent job" that particularly shined in the Episode Three cliffhanger, where the final scenes "are so well-realised it's easy to forget that they're animation at all".

On 1 November 2023, for the programme's 60th anniversary, The Moonbase (with the animated versions of Episodes 1 and 3) became available to stream in the UK on BBC iPlayer.

== Bibliography ==
- Ainsworth, John, ed. (2016). "The Power of the Daleks, The Highlanders, The Underwater Menace, and The Moonbase". Doctor Who: The Complete History. Vol. 9, no. 34. London: Panini Comics, Hachette Partworks.
- Wright, Mark, ed. (2018). "Fury From the Deep, The Wheel in Space and The Dominators". Doctor Who: The Complete History. Vol. 12. Panini Comics, Hachette Partworks. ISSN 2057-6048.
