= The Highlanders (Doctor Who) =

031 – The Highlanders
- Doctor Who serial

Cast
- Doctor: Patrick Troughton – Second Doctor
- Companions: Anneke Wills – Polly; Michael Craze – Ben Jackson; Frazer Hines – Jamie McCrimmon
- Others: Donald Bisset – The Laird; William Dysart – Alexander; Hannah Gordon – Kirsty; Andrew Downie – Willie Mackay; David Garth – Solicitor Grey; Sydney Arnold – Perkins; Dallas Cavell – Captain Trask; Michael Elwyn – Lt. Algernon ffinch; Guy Middleton – Colonel Attwood; Peter Welch – Sergeant; Tom Bowman – Sentry; Barbara Bruce – Mollie; Peter Diamond – Sailor

Production
- Directed by: Hugh David
- Written by: Elwyn Jones; Gerry Davis
- Script editor: Gerry Davis
- Produced by: Innes Lloyd
- Music by: none (Note: Each episode opens with a stock track from the BBC library of the traditional lament "Pibroch" by bagpiper Seumas MacNiell. No other music was arranged for the serial.)
- Production code: FF
- Series: Season 4
- Running time: 4 episodes, 25 minutes each
- Episode(s) missing: All episodes
- First broadcast: 17 December 1966
- Last broadcast: 7 January 1967

Chronology
← Preceded by The Power of the Daleks	Followed by → The Underwater Menace

The Highlanders is the completely missing fourth serial of the fourth season of the British science fiction television series Doctor Who, which was first broadcast in four weekly parts from 17 December 1966 to 7 January 1967.

In this serial, the Doctor (Patrick Troughton) and his travelling companions Ben (Michael Craze) and Polly (Anneke Wills) arrive in the Scottish Highlands in 1746, just after the Battle of Culloden. They gain the trust of the Jacobites, but their friendliness gets them into serious trouble with government troops led by Lieutenant Algernon ffinch (Michael Elwyn). This serial is the first appearance of Frazer Hines as companion-to-be Jamie McCrimmon.

Although audio recordings, still photographs, and clips of the story exist, no episodes of this serial are known to have survived.

== Plot ==
Following the Battle of Culloden, government forces have defeated Charles Edward Stewart's Jacobite Army. When the TARDIS arrives, the Second Doctor, Ben and Polly are taken prisoner by the fleeing Jacobites. They hide in a deserted cottage with the badly wounded Laird Colin McLaren, along with his daughter Kirsty and his piper Jamie McCrimmon. A government patrol captures the Doctor, Jamie, Ben and the Laird; Polly and Kirsty manage to slip away.

The duo hide from the patrol's leader Lieutenant Algernon ffinch, who believes Stewart to be one of them following the rumour that he fled the battlefield. Eventually ffinch finds them, but they trick him and steal his money. Later in Inverness, they run into him again and use his previous foolishness to blackmail him.

Elsewhere on the battlefield, Grey, the Royal Commissioner of Prisons, plans to ship Jacobite prisoners of war to the West Indies and sell them into indentured servitude. He contacts sea captain Trask, who provides his ship Annabelle. The detainees are taken to a prison in Inverness, where the Doctor manages to escape by tricking Grey. Trask arranges for a number of prisoners, including Jamie, Ben and the Laird, to be transferred to Annabelle. Ben, Jamie, Colin and one of Colin's friends, Willie Mackay, refuse to sign their contracts after learning their fate. When Ben attacks Grey, Trask has him thrown into the sea.

The Doctor reunites with Polly, Kirsty and Ben, who has swum to safety. The group returns to Annabelle, the Doctor lying to Grey that Jamie is Stewart. While Grey and Trask are distracted, Polly and Kirsty free the Jacobite prisoners and supply them with weapons for an uprising. When Grey and Trask check on Jamie, they are captured by the freed prisoners and a revolt begins; Trask is thrown overboard. Willie takes control of Annabelle and sails to France, taking Kirsty and Colin.

The Doctor, Ben, Polly and Jamie return to the town, using Grey as a hostage to ensure their freedom of movement to find the TARDIS. The party loses Grey but finds ffinch, whom they force to help them return to Culloden. ffinch arrests Grey for the transportation scheme, as he has lost the paperwork thanks to the Doctor and is unable to prove the legality of his plans. The Doctor, Ben and Polly return to the TARDIS and invite Jamie on board.

== Production ==
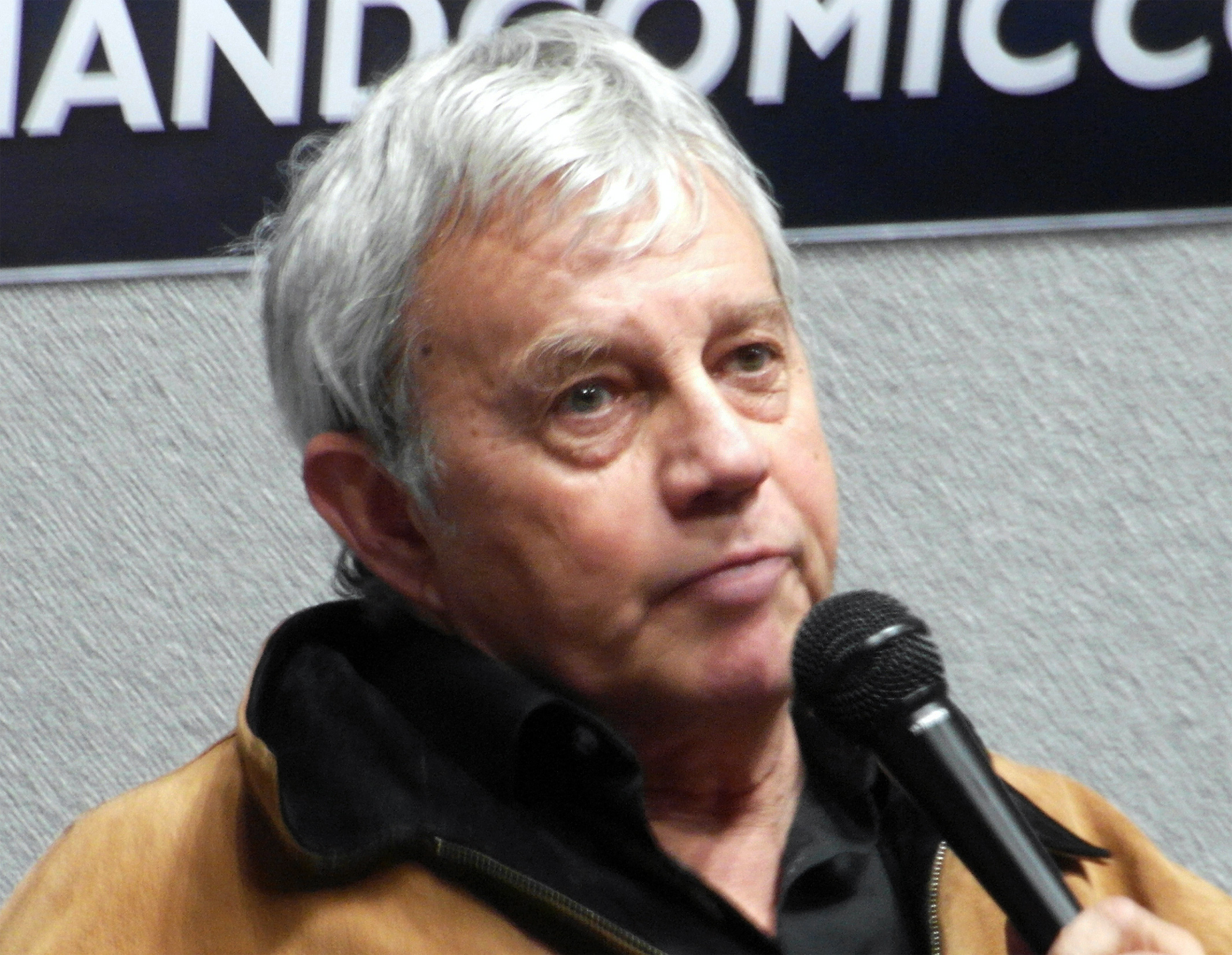
The Highlanders introduces Frazer Hines in the role of Jamie McCrimmon

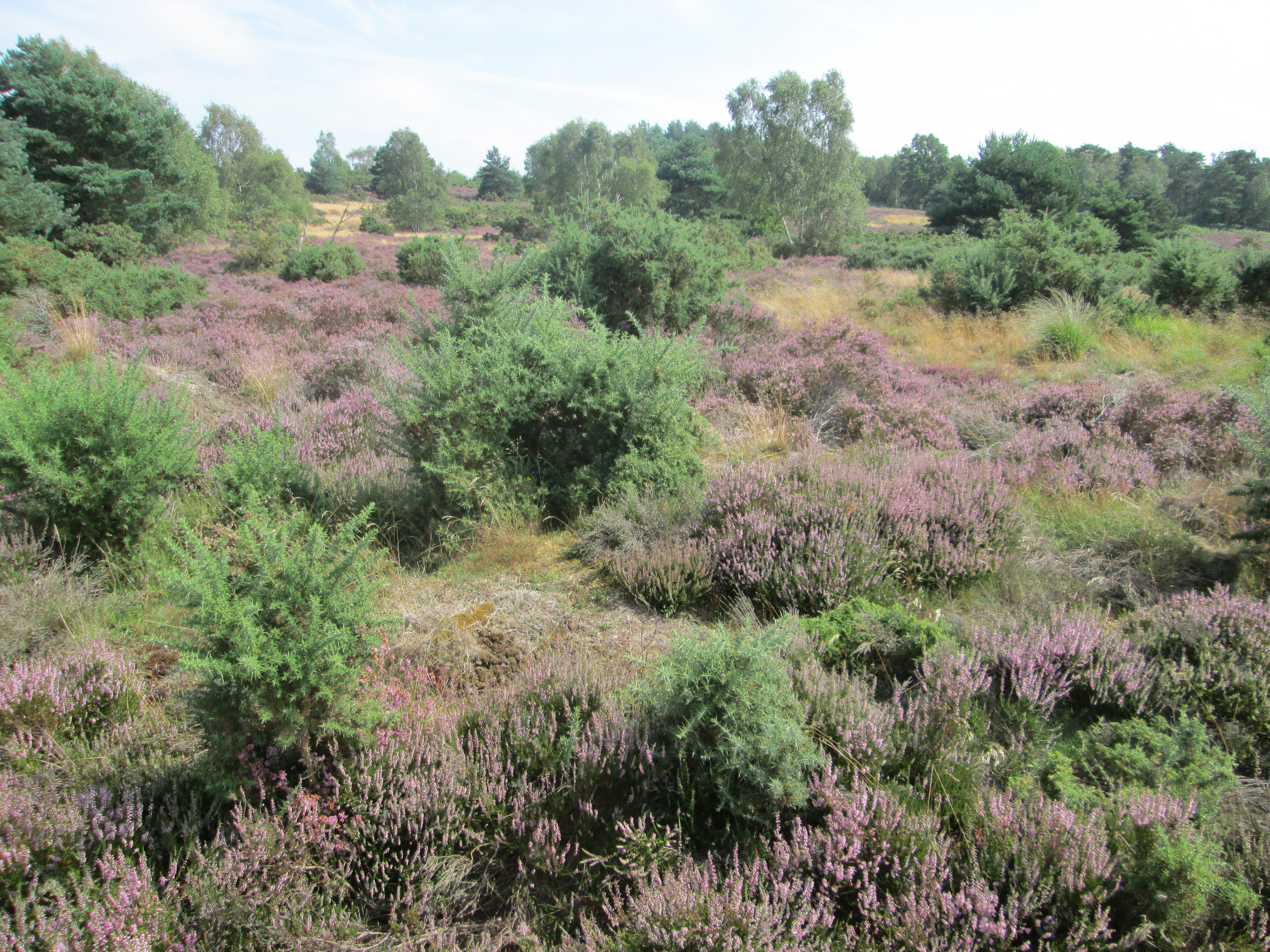
Frensham Common and Ponds in Surrey, England, served as the filming location for the Scottish Highlands

The script was commissioned from Elwyn Jones, who proved ultimately too busy to actually write it. Script editor Gerry Davis stepped in to write the serial. Jones and Davis shared on-screen credit although Jones did no work on the script. The working title for this story was Culloden; however, a few years previously the BBC had aired a docudrama titled Culloden which resulted in the changing of the name of this story.

The Highlanders was the last purely historical story until Black Orchid in 1982. Patrick Troughton encouraged the move away from historical stories, according to his son Michael, out of an interest in exploring "real science in drama" as well as a desire to further distinguish his era from that of the previous Doctor, William Hartnell.

The serial was directed by Hugh David; while he was still an actor in the early 1960s David had been considered for the role of the First Doctor, but as he was only 38 years old at the time, he was deemed to be too young by the series' original producer Verity Lambert.

The Highlanders was the first Doctor Who serial to have its videotapes wiped, which occurred on 9 March 1967, just two months after its broadcast. Only brief clips from episode 1 survive.

=== Filming ===
The Battle of Culloden scenes were filmed on location at Frensham Ponds in Surrey. Inverness Harbour was recreated by filming next to a water tank at the BBC's Ealing Studios.

=== Cast notes ===
Producer Innes Lloyd and script editor Gerry Davis were initially uncertain whether the character of Jamie would work as an ongoing character, and although Frazer Hines' contract had an option for three more serials, an ending was filmed with Jamie staying behind when the TARDIS departed. Hines' performance during shooting ultimately convinced them that the character had potential and the ending was re-shot. His popularity with the public ensured Jamie became a longtime member of the TARDIS crew.

William Dysart later appeared in The Ambassadors of Death (1970). Hannah Gordon provided the voice of Skagra's ship in the Big Finish Productions version of Shada. Peter Welch was later seen in The Android Invasion (1975). David Garth went on to play the Time Lord in Terror of the Autons (1971).

== Broadcast and reception ==
Episode	Title	Run time	Original release date	UK viewers (millions)	Archive
1	"Episode 1"^{†}	24:38	17 December 1966	6.7	Only audio, stills and fragments exist
2	"Episode 2"^{†}	23:41	24 December 1966	6.8	Only audio, and stills exist
3	"Episode 3"^{†}	22:54	31 December 1966	7.4	Only audio, and stills exist
4	"Episode 4"^{†}	24:19	7 January 1967	7.3	Only audio, and stills exist

^† Episode is missing

=== Critical reception ===
Reviewing the serial in 2009 in the Radio Times, Mark Braxton gave the serial three stars out of five, remarking that as the last of the purely historical Doctor Who serials, The Highlanders has "little real excitement" due to it being set in the aftermath of Culloden, rather than during the battle itself. He was also mildly critical of "pantomime and cliché" in the serial, in particular Patrick Troughton's use of silly voices and unconvincing disguises.

== Commercial releases ==
=== In print ===
The Highlanders
- Author: Gerry Davis
- Cover artist: Nick Spender
- Series: Doctor Who book: Target novelisations
- Release number: 90
- Publisher: Target Books
- Publication date: 15 November 1984
- ISBN: 0-426-19676-7

A novelisation of this serial, written by Gerry Davis, was published by Target Books in August 1984.

=== Home media ===
As with all missing episodes of Doctor Who, full off-air audio recordings exist due to contemporary fan efforts. In August 2000 these were released on CD, accompanied by linking narration from Frazer Hines. A few brief video clips survive, and were released on the Lost in Time DVD set in 2004. A new unabridged reading of the novelisation of The Highlanders was released in September 2012 read by Anneke Wills (who played Polly in the original TV episodes), with original sound design.

Charles Norton, director of several animated reconstructions, noted in 2019 that an animated version of The Highlanders was considered, but due to the difficulty in animating the clothing and locations, the team instead went ahead with The Macra Terror.

== Bibliography ==
- Writers Elwyn Jones, Gerry Davis, Director Hugh David, Producer Innes Lloyd (17 December 1966 – 7 January 1967). The Highlanders. Doctor Who. London. BBC. BBC1.
- Howe, David J.; Walker, Stephen James (2003). The Television Companion: The Unofficial and Unauthorised Guide to DOCTOR WHO (2nd ed.). Surrey, UK: Telos Publishing Ltd. ISBN 1-903889-51-0.
- Campbell, Mark (23 March 2012). Doctor Who. Pocket Essentials. ISBN 978-1-84243-660-8.
- Howe, David J.; Stammers, Mark; Walker, Stephen James (1997). Doctor Who The Handbook – The Second Doctor. London: Doctor Who Books. p. 51. ISBN 0-426-20516-2.
