= The Tomb of the Cybermen =

037 – The Tomb of the Cybermen
- Doctor Who serial
- The Cybermen emerging from their tombs in a promotional photo for the serial. This has been considered an iconic moment in the serial by reviewers.

Cast
- Doctor: Patrick Troughton – Second Doctor
- Companions: Frazer Hines – Jamie McCrimmon; Deborah Watling – Victoria Waterfield
- Others: Shirley Cooklin – Kaftan; Roy Stewart – Toberman; George Pastell – Eric Klieg; Aubrey Richards – Professor Parry; Cyril Shaps – John Viner; Bernard Holley – Peter Haydon; George Roubicek – Captain Hopper; Clive Merrison – Jim Callum; Alan Johns – Ted Rogers; Ray Grover – Crewman; Peter Hawkins – Cybermen Voices; Michael Kilgarriff – Cyberman Controller; Hans De Vries, Tony Harwood, John Hogan, Richard Kerley, Ronald Lee, Charles Pemberton, Kenneth Seeger, Reg Whitehead – Cybermen

Production
- Directed by: Morris Barry
- Written by: Kit Pedler; Gerry Davis
- Script editor: Victor Pemberton
- Produced by: Peter Bryant
- Executive producer: None
- Music by: None (Note: This serial used stock music composed by Paul Bonneau, Eric Sendel, Trevor Duncan, Wilfred Josephs, Heinrich Feischner, Desmond Leslie, John Scott, Steve Race, Frank Talley, Eric Siday, Wolf Droyson, Edwin Braden, Martin Slavin, and Roberto Gerhard)
- Production code: MM
- Series: Season 5
- Running time: 4 episodes, 25 minutes each
- First broadcast: 2 September 1967
- Last broadcast: 23 September 1967

Chronology
← Preceded by The Evil of the Daleks	Followed by → The Abominable Snowmen

The Tomb of the Cybermen is the first serial of the fifth season of the British science fiction television series Doctor Who, which was originally broadcast in four weekly parts on BBC1 from 2 to 23 September 1967. In the serial, the time traveller the Second Doctor (Patrick Troughton) and his travelling companions, Jamie McCrimmon (Frazer Hines) and Victoria Waterfield (Deborah Watling), get caught up in an expedition to the planet Telos. The financiers of the expedition, Eric Klieg (George Pastell) and Kaftan (Shirley Cooklin), intend to revitalise the Cybermen that are buried on Telos in underground tombs, hoping they will share their power to conquer the universe.

The Cybermen had historically been popular antagonists in the series, and the production team for the series was keen to bring them back for another story. Writers Kit Pedler and Gerry Davis, inspired by Egyptian archaeology at the time, decided to have the Cybermen be in similarly styled tombs, resulting in the setting of the story. The serial was filmed from June to July 1967. All of its parts were initially wiped, resulting in the episode being considered missing; however, all of its parts were found and recovered in the 1990s in Hong Kong, and it has subsequently been released on home media and a variety of other releases.

The Tomb of the Cybermen has been heralded as one of Doctor Who's greatest stories, with many critics and fans alike considering it to be one of the strongest in the show's history. Retrospective reviews have largely been positive, with particular praise for a scene in which the Doctor comforts Victoria; however, some retrospective critics have disliked the episode, with some writing that elements of its narrative were racially insensitive. The serial has been referenced in subsequent Cyberman stories.

== Plot ==
Landing on the planet Telos, the Second Doctor (Patrick Troughton), Jamie McCrimmon (Frazer Hines), and Victoria Waterfield (Deborah Watling) encounter an archaeological expedition. Funded by Kaftan (Shirley Cooklin), who is accompanied by her colleague Klieg (George Pastell) and her servant Toberman (Roy Stewart), the group seek to explore the tomb of the Cybermen, who died out five centuries before. The Doctor helps open the tomb's electrified doors and stays behind with Klieg to open the crypt while the others explore the building.

After a crewman on the expedition dies to an old Cyberman gun, the expedition is intended to be called off, only for the crew to discover their rocket has been sabotaged. The crew open and enter the crypt, where they find a small army of frozen Cybermen. Kaftan and Klieg betray the group and revive the Cybermen, who they hope to recruit for a conquest of the universe. However, the Cybermen seize the crew, intending to rebuild their invasion force and conquer Earth. A rescue mission results in Toberman being captured by the Cybermen. The group disarm and imprison Kaftan and Klieg, only for the pair to fix the Cyberman gun, hoping to force the Cybermen into their alliance.

With their energy levels running low, the Cybermen return to the crypt whilst their Controller and Toberman meet with the group. The Doctor attempts to sabotage the Controller's revitalisation, but the Controller attacks the crew, murdering Kaftan. Toberman is able to break free of the Cybermen's conditioning and disables the Controller. While he, the Doctor, and Jamie return to refreeze the crypt, Klieg, unable to accept that the Cybermen will not forge an alliance, tries to stop them, only to be murdered by a Cyberman. After Toberman destroys it, the Doctor activates the crypt and sets an electric circuit around the doors, hoping that the Cybermen will stay there for good.

The Doctor resets the tomb's defences to ensure the Cybermen will not be revived again, only to discover the Controller is still functional. The Doctor flees and tries to enclose it with the survivors' help, but they are overpowered. Toberman sacrifices himself to close the doors to the tomb, electrocuting both him and the Controller. With the rocket repaired, the expedition leaves, the Doctor and his companions bidding them goodbye. As they leave, they fail to spot a surviving Cybermat, metal creations the Cybermen had used to attack the team earlier, which approaches Toberman's body.

== Production ==
=== Conception and writing ===
The Cybermen had been recurring antagonists in the series, appearing prior in the stories The Tenth Planet (1966) and The Moonbase (1967). Ratings for these stories indicated to the Doctor Who production team the popularity of the Cybermen. As a result, a day prior to the final episode of The Moonbase's airing, another Cyberman serial was commissioned to be produced. Kit Pedler, the Cybermen's creator, was brought on to write the serial alongside then-script editor Gerry Davis. Pedler wished to focus the serial on the Cybermen's history, and, with both him and Davis having an interest in Egyptian archaeology at the time, they decided to have the Cybermen be in similarly styled tombs. This would provide a "claustrophobic" setting for the story, which would be set on Telos, the Cybermen's "new" home planet that was originally referred to in removed dialogue in The Moonbase. Due to Pedler's lack of writing experience, Davis had significant input on the script and its writing.

Peter Bryant, who had previously been assistant to Gerry Davis and been newly promoted to script editor on the preceding story, was allowed to produce this serial in order to prove that he could take over from Innes Lloyd as producer later on in the season. Bryant's own assistant, Victor Pemberton, acted as script editor on this serial, but left the series after production of the serial was finished, deciding that he didn't want to be a script editor. When Bryant's eventual promotion to producer came, Derrick Sherwin became script editor. The working titles for this story were The Ice Tombs of Telos and The Cybermen Planet. The story was originally intended to be in the show's fourth season, being the final story, but was later held over to be the season opener of the fifth. As a result, the story included scenes to reintroduce the main cast, most notably Victoria Waterfield, portrayed by actress Deborah Watling, who was introduced in the prior story, 1967's The Evil of the Daleks.

Kaftan's role was written specifically for Shirley Cooklin, who was Bryant's wife. Toberman was originally intended to be deaf and wear a hearing aid, which is why he lacks much dialogue. One new creation devised for the story were the Cybermats. They were inspired by silverfish and designed to be small, metallic creatures the Cybermen would use in their plans. Both Pedler and Davis saw potential for the Cybermats to be sold as toys, with the pair hoping they would reach a level of success similar to the Daleks years prior.

The Cybermen largely re-used costumes from The Moonbase, though some had alterations. The Controller was a new costume, with a large, bulbous head and no chest unit, unlike the other Cybermen. The Controller's dome was originally meant to light up, though this failed due to techncial troubles, resulting in it not being fully seen on-screen.

=== Casting ===
Series regulars Patrick Troughton, Frazer Hines, and Deborah Watling reprised their usual roles of the Second Doctor, Jamie McCrimmon, and Victoria Waterfield, respectively. George Pastell portrays Kleig, Shirley Cooklin portrays Kaftan, and Roy Stewart portrays Toberman. Michael Kilgarriff portrays the Cyber-Controller, though only physically; Peter Hawkins performed the Cybermen voices, including that of the Cyber-Controller's, using voice modulation technology. Kilgarriff would later reprise the part of the Cyber-Controller in 1985's Attack of the Cybermen, though in that story uses his own voice for the character's dialogue instead of the modulated voices of another actor.

=== Filming ===
Filming started on 12 June 1967 with the exterior scenes for Telos, which were recorded at Gerrards Cross Sand and Gravel Quarry in Buckinghamshire. The following day saw scenes filmed at the door of the tomb being filmed. The 14th saw scenes in the tombs being filled. The tomb set used a four-level vertical stage, with plastic film being placed upon cells in the set that would act as the individual tombs housing Cybermen. Filming continued through the following day, eventually wrapping on the 19th after some model shots of the tombs freezing and unfreezing were filmed. Studio recording would begin in July 1967 and wrap on the 22nd of that month.

== Broadcast, archive and reception ==
Episode	Title	Run time	Original release date	UK viewers (millions)	Appreciation Index
1	"Episode One"	23:58	2 September 1967	6.0	53
2	"Episode Two"	24:44	9 September 1967	6.4	52
3	"Episode Three"	24:14	16 September 1967	7.2	49
4	"Episode Four"	23:22	23 September 1967	7.4	50

The story attained solid viewing figures, with the number of viewers rising by over a million by the time of its conclusion. Viewing figures were especially solid compared to fourth season opener The Smugglers (1966), though maintained average audience appreciation figures. The serial's fourth part was the second highest rated children's programme of that month.

=== Missing episodes and subsequent airings ===
Following sales to other countries, the serial were ordered to be wiped from BBC Archives in September 1969, though they were kept offered for purchase for overseas buyers until 1974 when the story's tapes were wiped. Subsequently, it was considered one of the series' missing stories, with none of its parts held in the BBC Archives. An unofficial off-air soundtrack of the serial persisted over the years. All of the story's parts would later be recovered in 1992 in Hong Kong, and would be returned to BBC Enterprises.

Shortly following the story's recovery, the serial was aired as a preview screening in Soho. It was aired at BAFTA in 1992 at a panel, dubbed Tombwatch, that was held in coordination with the fan club known as the Doctor Who Appreciation Society. This panel featured many involved with production of the story. On 24 February 2013, the episode aired in the United States on BBC America as part of a year-long celebration and acknowledgement of the 50th anniversary of Doctor Who. Prior to the episode's airing that evening, a short documentary was aired which featured interviews with former, current and original Doctor Who production staff who shared their memories and perspectives of Patrick Troughton.

=== Reception ===
Following the transmission of the first episode, the BBC's Head of Drama Sydney Newman personally congratulated Peter Bryant on what he had seen, which Bryant later recalled: "Coming from the man who created Doctor Who that was the ultimate compliment, even more so seeing as it was my first job as producer." Many other BBC higher-ups were also significantly pleased with the story, though it did attract controversy with some viewers, who thought it was too violent. On 26 September 1967, Kit Pedler appeared on the BBC series Talkback, hosted by David Coleman, to defend the serial.

The Tomb of the Cybermen has historically been considered one of the most popular serials in the history of the series. Prior to its recovery, the serial being considered entirely lost, as well as the story's purported high quality, caused the story to gain an almost "legendary" presence in the Doctor Who fandom. Literary critic John Kenneth Muir described the serial as perhaps being the best serial in the entire original run of the series, praising the story's set design, its usage and subversion of mummy movie tropes, the depth of the human villains' motivations, and the usage of the Cybermen. In 2009, Mark Braxton of Radio Times wrote that the serial was a "classic", praising the set design, usage of the Cybermen, and Troughton's acting and dynamic with Hines. Morgan Jeffery, writing for Digital Spy in 2013, praised the story, in particular highlighting the effectiveness of the Cybermen as terrifying antagonists and Troughton's performance as the Second Doctor, with Jeffery stating that the serial is "the story that every other Doctor Who adventure wants to be."

Reviewing the serial for The Independent in 2012, Neela Debnath regarded the story as having aged particularly well, highlighting the impressive set design, the Cybermen, and Troughton's performance, though felt the Cybermats were not particularly effective antagonists. In The Television Companion (1998), David J. Howe and Stephen James Walker praised the usage of the Cybermen, as well as the characterisations of the various human antagonists, though felt certain aspects of the production were "silly", and that the Cybermats' threat was never well-defined in the story. Christopher Bahn of The A.V. Club was less positive, writing that the story's plot was weak and the Cybermen lacked much threat, though he praised Troughton's performance. Andrew Blair of Den of Geek, in a 2025 retrospective on Cybermen stories, wrote that the characters often had to be dumbed down for the story to function, and that many moments worked better in isolation than in the context of the wider story.

Bahn wrote in his review of the story that the serial relied heavily on racial stereotypes, particularly in the form of the villains. The portrayal of Toberman in the story has been considered "racially problematic" by critics, including The Guardian's Dan Martin, with Bahn similarly stating that Toberman was a character that ran afoul of stereotypes. Adi Tantimedh, writing for Bleeding Cool in 2022, wrote that Toberman fell into racial stereotypes regarding black characters in the 1960s, particularly via his muscular physique and his sacrifice in order to save other white characters. Concerns about the depiction of Toberman were shared by the British Board of Film Classification (BBFC), who cited this as their reason to give the serial a harsher PG certificate, rather than the U desired by the BBC, when classifying its VHS release in 1992.

The scene in which the Doctor comforts Victoria (a snippet of which is seen above) has been praised by critics.

Several scenes in the story have been highlighted as some of the most iconic. Martin praised a scene where the Doctor comforts Victoria as being one of the most heartfelt moments in the series, with Muir similarly stating that the scene provides "a human moment amidst the horror of the story," highlighting it as showing the emotional depth of the Second Doctor's time on the show. Braxton also praised the scene, particularly for its usage of close-ups to convey a tender moment, with DVD Talk's J. Doyle Wallis stating that it was "a rather touching and revelatory moment not often seen in the series" and Jeffery stating that it was one of the series' strongest moments featuring a companion. Charlie Jane Anders of io9 listed the cliffhanger to the second episode – in which the Cybermen break out of their tombs – as one of the greatest cliffhangers in the history of Doctor Who, with Blair similarly highlighting this scene as an iconic moment in the series. Martin similarly praised the cliffhanger and the subsequent reveal of the Cyber-Controller.

=== Later usage in other media ===
The serial would be referenced in later stories featuring the Cybermen. 1985's Attack of the Cybermen has Telos be a major setting in the story, with a redesigned tomb setting and the return of the Cyber-Controller seen in Tomb, with his original actor reprising the role. 2013's "Nightmare in Silver" and 2014's "Dark Water" would see structures resembling the tombs seen in this serial being used to house dormant Cybermen, with scenes of the Cybermen leaving these structures homaging Tomb. The Cybermats would later return in subsequent Cyberman stories, such as 1968's The Wheel in Space, 1975's Revenge of the Cybermen, and 2011's "Closing Time". Music from the 2013 BBC Proms focusing on Doctor Who had a soundtrack from the serial play alongside music from other serials in the Classic era. Telos would later be included in the 2015 crossover game Lego Dimensions as a visitable location. An audio drama sequel to the story, dubbed Return to Telos, would also be released in 2015.

The serial was adapted, with the BBC's clearance, in an unofficial 1998 theatre production produced by students at Oxford Brookes University. The production substituted Jamie and Victoria for Ben and Polly and featured two Doctors.

== Commercial releases ==
=== In print ===
Doctor Who and the Tomb of the Cybermen
- Author: Gerry Davis
- Cover artist: Jeff Cummins
- Series: Doctor Who book: Target novelisations
- Release number: 66
- Publisher: Target Books
- Publication date: 18 May 1978
- ISBN: 0-426-11076-5

Gerry Davis would later novelise the story, entitled Doctor Who and The Tomb of the Cybermen, which was published by Target Books in 1978. The book would later be re-issued in 1992, and an audiobook, read by Michael Kilgarriff, would be released in 2013. Doctor Who – The Scripts: The Tomb of the Cybermen would be released in 1989, with the book featuring an amended script of the story which included production notes.

=== Home media ===
Shortly following the serial's recovery, the story was swiftly released on home video later in 1992 and received high sales figures, beating out the recent release of Aliens: Special Edition. A DVD release was released in 2002 featuring numerous special features, and a revamped special edition on DVD would be released in 2012. The story was also featured in numerous DVD collections released in 2006, 2011, and 2013.

A soundtrack release of the episode was put on sale in 1993, delayed due to the return of Tomb to the archives. The soundtrack would be released again in 2006, this time including narration by Frazer Hines. It was later included in a bundle of other soundtrack releases in a 2017 compilation of Classic era soundtracks. A vinyl release of the soundtrack was released in 2018 for Record Store Day. The Doctor Who Appreciation Society would release a variety of stock music used in various 1960s stories, including those used in Tomb, in a 1987 release; various pieces of stock music from the serial would be included in various releases in 1997, 1998, 2013, and 2014.

In 2023, for the programme's 60th anniversary, The Tomb of the Cybermen became available to stream on BBC iPlayer. It is available internationally on streaming service BritBox.

=== Music release ===
Music from The Tomb of the Cybermen

Soundtrack album
- Released: May 1997
- Genre: Soundtrack
- Length: 22:40
- Label: Via Satellite Records

Doctor Who soundtrack chronology
The Worlds of Doctor Who (1994)	Music from The Tomb of the Cybermen (1997)	Original Soundtrack Recording (1997)

Stock music and sound effects from this story was released on a "mini-album" by Via Satellite in May 1997. It had 2 versions of the Doctor Who theme music, sound effects from Doctor Who: 30 Years at the BBC Radiophonic Workshop, and an incomplete selection of stock music used in the story. It was planned to be the first in a series of mini-albums, with The Faceless Ones and Inside the Spaceship being mooted as future albums. Neither was produced.

Library tracks used in The Tomb of the Cybermen but missing from this CD include "Univers Sidéral" by Paul Bonneau, assorted "Synchro-Stings" by Trevor Duncan, "Sting Tintabuloid 1" by Desmond Leslie, "Eerie Vaults" by Steve Race, "Suspended Animation", "Galaxy" and "Hypnosis" by Eric Siday, "Dramatic Brass Chords" by Wolf Droysen, and from Frank Talley's Off Center Suite: "Dark Pursuit", "Off Center" and "Panic in the Streets".

== Bibliography ==
- Andrew Beech (Producer), Peter Finklestone (Editor). Tombwatch (Documentary; Special feature on the original 2002 The Tomb of the Cyberman DVD release). BBC Video.
- Howe, David J.; Walker, Stephen James (2003). The Television Companion: The Unofficial and Unauthorised Guide to DOCTOR WHO (2nd ed.). Telos Publishing. ISBN 1-903889-51-0.
- Writers Kit Pedler, Gerry Davis, Director Morris Barry, Producer Peter Bryant (2–23 September 1967). The Tomb of the Cybermen. Doctor Who. London. BBC. BBC1.
- Wright, Mark, ed. (2017). "The Macra Terror, The Faceless Ones, The Evil of the Daleks and The Tomb of the Cybermen". Doctor Who: The Complete History. 10 (49). London: Panini Comics, Hachette Partworks. ISSN 2057-6048.
