= The Evil of the Daleks =

036 – The Evil of the Daleks
- Doctor Who serial

Cast
- Doctor: Patrick Troughton – Second Doctor
- Companions: Frazer Hines – Jamie McCrimmon; Deborah Watling – Victoria Waterfield
- Others: John Bailey – Edward Waterfield; Marius Goring – Theodore Maxtible; Brigit Forsyth – Ruth Maxtible; Geoffrey Colville – Perry; Griffith Davies – Kennedy; Alec Ross – Bob Hall; Windsor Davies – Toby; Sonny Caldinez – Kemel; Gary Watson – Arthur Terrall; Jo Rowbottom – Mollie Dawson; Peter Hawkins, Roy Skelton – Dalek Voices; Robert Jewell, Gerald Taylor, John Scott Martin, Murphy Grumbar, Ken Tyllsen – Daleks

Production
- Directed by: Derek Martinus
- Written by: David Whitaker
- Script editor: Gerry Davis (episodes 1–3); Peter Bryant (episodes 4–7)
- Produced by: Innes Lloyd; Peter Bryant (associate producer, episode 1)
- Executive producer: None
- Music by: Dudley Simpson
- Production code: LL
- Series: Season 4
- Running time: 7 episodes, 25 minutes each
- Episode(s) missing: 6 episodes (1, 3–7)
- First broadcast: 20 May 1967
- Last broadcast: 1 July 1967

Chronology
← Preceded by The Faceless Ones	Followed by → The Tomb of the Cybermen

The Evil of the Daleks is the mostly missing ninth and final serial of the fourth season of the British science fiction television series Doctor Who, which originally aired in seven weekly parts from 20 May to 1 July 1967.

In this serial, the Doctor (Patrick Troughton) and his travelling companion Jamie (Frazer Hines), shortly after losing the TARDIS, are transported to 1866, where the Daleks force the Doctor to help them in their latest plot to implement the human factor into Dalek brains in order to 'humanise' themselves into even deadlier living weapons. This serial marked the debut of Deborah Watling as the Doctor's new companion, Victoria Waterfield. It is also notable for introducing the Dalek Emperor. Only episode two, the episode in which Victoria first appears, is held in the BBC archives; the other six remain missing.

This story was initially intended to be the last Dalek story on Doctor Who. Writer Terry Nation, the creator of the Daleks, was trying to sell the Daleks to American television at the time and it was intended to give them a big send-off from the series. Aside from a few cameos, the Daleks did not properly return to the series until Day of the Daleks in 1972. In 1993, readers of DreamWatch Bulletin voted The Evil of the Daleks as the best ever Doctor Who story in a special poll for the series' thirtieth anniversary.

The story was released on DVD and Blu-ray in animated form on 27 September 2021, with the surviving episode two included.

== Plot ==
In 1966, the Second Doctor and Jamie watch the TARDIS being driven away on a lorry from Gatwick Airport. The trail leads them to a shop run by Edward Waterfield, who sells seemingly new Victorian-style antiques. While investigating, the Doctor and Jamie are gassed by a trap, and dragged into a time machine by Edward. They wake up in the house of Theodore Maxtible in Kent, 1866. Maxtible and Edward tried to invent a time machine, when the Daleks emerged from their time cabinet. The Daleks then took Edward's daughter, Victoria, hostage and forced Edward to lure in the Doctor.

The Daleks threaten to destroy the TARDIS unless the Doctor isolates the "Human Factor", the qualities that allow humans to consistently defeat the Daleks, and implant it into three Daleks, strengthening them. Once the Doctor complies, the three Daleks become human in personality, before they return through the time cabinet to Skaro, their home planet.

Maxtible betrays the humans for the alchemical secret of transmuting base metals into gold. He travels to Skaro through the time cabinet, but is tortured for not bringing the Doctor. Jamie, Edward and the Doctor also reach Skaro before the Daleks explode Maxtible's house. The trio meet the Dalek Emperor in the Dalek city, who reveals their true plan: by isolating the Human Factor, the Doctor also isolated the "Dalek Factor". The Dalek Factor— qualities of relentless killing machines—will reconvert the "human" Daleks and be spread the throughout human history by the Doctor with the TARDIS, turning humanity into Daleks.

Maxtible is tricked into walking through an archway that infuses him with the Dalek Factor. He hypnotises the Doctor and lures him through the arch as well. The Doctor, unaffected as an alien, feigns conversion and suggests that all Daleks be put through the conversion arch, while the Daleks hunt for the three "human" Daleks. Daleks start going through the arch, but the Doctor substituted the factors, so the Daleks that go through will rebel against the Emperor. The Emperor calls out his guards as the rebellion spreads and destroys the city. Edward is fatally wounded and the Doctor promises to protect Victoria. While the Doctor and his companions escape, Maxtible returns to the exploding city. Jamie and the Doctor take Victoria along on their travels. The Doctor pronounces the end of the Daleks, as a light appears from a damaged Dalek.

== Production ==
=== Cast notes ===
Patrick Troughton only appears in pre-filmed insert scenes for the fourth episode, as he was on holiday. Likewise Deborah Watling only appears in a pre-filmed scene in episode four. John Bailey, who played Edward Waterfield, had previously appeared in The Sensorites, and would later appear in The Horns of Nimon.

According to the short BBC Video documentary The Dalek Factor about the making of the story, released in September 2021 as part of the animated restoration of the serial, Denise Buckley was cast in the role of Victoria Waterfield by director Derek Martinus. The production team had been hoping that Pauline Collins would continue in the role of Samantha Briggs, that she had played in the previous story The Faceless Ones, but had created Victoria as a back-up should Collins decline. When Collins confirmed she did not want to join the regular cast, it was decided to introduce Victoria as the new companion and Denise Buckley was released, but paid in full, with Deborah Watling replacing her as a more suitable actress for the ongoing role.

=== Missing episodes ===
This story was wiped from the BBC's archives by the mid-1970s. Only episode 2 remains, in a telerecording found at a car boot sale then returned to the archive in mid-1987, alongside Episode 3 of The Faceless Ones.

In 2004, analysis of the repeated clip used in The Wheel in Space episode six revealed it to be from episode one rather than episode two, as had been long believed. This, however, only constitutes a few frames of recovered footage, as the rest of the footage is nearly identical to episode 2. The discovery of a behind-the-scenes film, The Last Dalek, made by the special effects team as they worked on the story's conclusion, facilitated a recreation of the climactic battle scenes. This recreation, along with the entire film, have been made available in different forms on various Troughton releases, and has often been used to fill in for the missing climax of Episode 7 in fan-made reconstructions, to give fans an idea of what it looked like when it first aired. In addition, tele-snaps and off-air audio recordings made by fans upon the original broadcasts exist for the entire story.

== Broadcast and reception ==
Episode	Title	Run time	Original release date	UK viewers (millions)	Archive
1	"Episode 1"^{†}	24:07	20 May 1967	8.1	Only audio, and stills exist
2	"Episode 2"	25:13	27 May 1967	7.5	16mm t/r
3	"Episode 3"^{†}	24:27	3 June 1967	6.1	Only audio, and stills exist
4	"Episode 4"^{†}	24:43	10 June 1967	5.3	Only audio, and stills exist
5	"Episode 5"^{†}	25:23	17 June 1967	5.1	Only audio, and stills exist
6	"Episode 6"^{†}	24:48	24 June 1967	6.8	Only audio, and stills exist
7	"Episode 7"^{†}	24:33	1 July 1967	6.1	Only audio, stills and fragments exist

^† Episode is missing

The Evil of the Daleks aired on BBC1 from 20 May to 1 July 1967. Most episodes were shown at 5:45 p.m., except Episode One was shown at 6 p.m. due to the FA Cup coverage, and Episode Seven was broadcast at 6:25 p.m. because of Wimbledon. Episode One, with 4.3 million homes, was the highest rated children's programme for May; Episode Six was the second most-watched in June (3.35 million homes); and Episode Seven was third for July with 2.9 million homes. The most-watched episode was Episode One, coming in 37th place with 8.1 million viewers.

The story was repeated in 1968 at the end of Season 5 (8 June 1968 to 22 June 1968 and 13 July 1968 to 3 August 1968 allowing for a two-week break for coverage of the 1968 Wimbledon tennis championships) at 5.15pm. At the end of The Wheel in Space, the Doctor used a telepathic display machine to show new companion Zoe Heriot the sort of monsters she would face if she joined the TARDIS crew, and shows a clip from the end of episode 1 of The Evil of the Daleks. Over the following weeks (bridging the gap between Seasons 5 and 6) the entire story was shown, narration over the opening scene of episode 1 reminding viewers of the reason for the repeat. This was the only time any Doctor Who episodes (other than the first episode) were reshown in the 1960s. The repeat viewing figures were 6.3, 5.0, 6.3, 5.0, 5.1, 4.5, 5.2 million viewers respectively.

Paul Cornell, Martin Day, and Keith Topping gave the serial a positive review in The Discontinuity Guide (1995), describing it as "a grandiose production which papers over its scientifically implausible aspects with a confident swagger." In The Television Companion (1998), David J. Howe and Stephen James Walker noted how The Evil of the Daleks paid tribute to the series' past, and praised Whitaker's writing and the production values. In 2009, Patrick Mulkern of Radio Times awarded it five stars out of five and wrote that the story "boasts an intriguing mystery, well-drawn characters, atmospheric settings and thrilling set-pieces", though it did have an "overly elaborate" plot. He particularly praised Jamie, as well as the incidental music. In a 2013 interview, Frazer Hines named The Evil of the Daleks as his favourite missing serial, highlighting the cast.

In the Doctor Who Magazine poll for the show's 60th anniversary in 2023, The Evil of the Daleks was voted the sixth best story of the Second Doctor's tenure, out of a total of 21. Charlie Jane Anders ranked the serial as the 50th best Doctor Who story (out of 254) in 2015, writing, "Some amazing stuff here, including remorseful Victorian mad scientists and Daleks playing trains, plus the first meeting with the Emperor Dalek."

=== Broadcast of recreation ===
The animated reconstruction mentioned under Home Media was shown on BBC America on Saturday, October 30, 2021, from 8 AM to 11:30 AM, the day before the release of "The Halloween Apocalypse" (Extended Cut), the first episode of the thirteenth series of the revived series.

== On stage ==
In 2006 the BBC and the Terry Nation estate licensed a charity stage version of the serial. It was adapted and directed by Nick Scovell, who also starred as the Doctor. Production was by Rob Thrush, who provided the Dalek voices, and the orchestral score was by Martin Johnson. The production ran at the New Theatre Royal, Portsmouth between 25 and 28 October 2006, playing to sell-out houses during its five-night run. £15,000 was raised towards the restoration of the theatre, with an additional £550 going to Children in Need.

== Commercial releases ==
=== In print ===
The Evil of the Daleks
- Author: John Peel
- Cover artist: Alister Pearson
- Series: Doctor Who book: Target novelisations
- Release number: 155
- Publisher: Doctor Who Books
- Publication date: 19 August 1993
- ISBN: 0-426-20389-5

Doctor Who Books, an imprint of Virgin Books, published a novelisation of this serial by John Peel in August 1993. It was the last serial of the original series to be novelised as part of Target's Doctor Who Library, due to copyright clearance difficulties from the Daleks' creator Terry Nation.

Another adaptation written by Frazer Hines was released in hardcover 26 October 2023. This adaptation follows the Doctor showing Zoe the story at the end of The Wheel in Space. An abridged version of this adaptation was released as a Target paperback exclusively with Doctor Who Magazine #609 on 10 October 2024.

=== Home media ===
As with all missing episodes, off-air recordings of the soundtrack exist due to contemporary fan efforts. In 1992 a set was released on audiocassette, accompanied by linking narration from the Fourth Doctor, Tom Baker. However, due to problems with background music clearance the scenes set in the Tricolour in episode one had to be deleted. Subsequently, better quality copies of the soundtrack emerged and in 2003, the remastered soundtrack was re-released with the excised scenes restored (albeit with the song "Paperback Writer" changed to "Hold Tight!") and with new narration by Frazer Hines. This CD release contains bonus tracks featuring the end of Episode 7 without narration, raw dialogue and sound effect recordings and the narrated opening to Episode 1 from the 1968 repeat.

The serial was originally released on CD in the Doctor Who: Daleks collector's tin, alongside the soundtrack to The Power of the Daleks and a bonus disc featuring My Life as a Dalek, a historical documentary presented by Mark Gatiss; it was re-issued individually in 2004. Hines' narrated version was released on vinyl by Demon Music Group on 19 July 2019. To promote the vinyl release, an exclusive EP of the CD's bonus tracks was bundled with the "Deluxe Edition" of Doctor Who Magazine issue 539.

In 1992, the sole surviving episode was featured in the Daleks: The Early Years VHS. In November 2004, the same episode was released on DVD as part of the Lost in Time box set.

The story was released on DVD and Blu-ray on 27 September 2021, with all seven episodes animated in both colour and black-and-white, with the surviving Episode 2 also included.
