= Twice Upon a Time (Doctor Who) =

276 – "Twice Upon a Time"
- Doctor Who episode
- Promotional poster

Cast
- Doctors: Peter Capaldi – Twelfth Doctor; David Bradley – First Doctor
- Companions: Pearl Mackie – Bill Potts; Mark Gatiss – The Captain
- Others: Jenna Coleman – Clara Oswald; Matt Lucas – Nardole; Nikki Amuka-Bird – Helen Clay; Toby Whithouse – German Soldier; Lily Travers – Polly; Jared Garfield – Ben Jackson; Nicholas Briggs – Voice of the Daleks; Jodie Whittaker – Thirteenth Doctor

Production
- Directed by: Rachel Talalay
- Written by: Steven Moffat (Note: Chris Chibnall wrote the Thirteenth Doctor's (Jodie Whittaker) dialogue at the end of the episode.)
- Produced by: Peter Bennett
- Executive producers: Steven Moffat; Brian Minchin
- Music by: Murray Gold
- Running time: 60 minutes
- First broadcast: 25 December 2017

Chronology
← Preceded by "The Doctor Falls"	Followed by → "The Woman Who Fell to Earth"

"Twice Upon a Time" is a special episode of the British science fiction television series Doctor Who, broadcast on BBC One on 25 December 2017 as the programme's thirteenth Christmas special. The episode was written by Steven Moffat and directed by Rachel Talalay. It features the final regular appearance of Peter Capaldi as the Twelfth Doctor, the first official appearance of Jodie Whittaker as the Thirteenth Doctor, and also stars David Bradley as the First Doctor. Pearl Mackie stars as the Twelfth Doctor's former companion Bill Potts, while his other companions make guest appearances – Jenna Coleman as Clara Oswald and Matt Lucas as Nardole. Mark Gatiss plays a First World War British army captain who is revealed to be a family member of Brigadier Lethbridge-Stewart.

The episode is a continuation of "The Doctor Falls", and takes place during the final serial of the First Doctor, The Tenth Planet (1966); footage from The Tenth Planet is used in the special. "Twice Upon a Time" is Capaldi's fourth and final Christmas special as the Twelfth Doctor, and was the last Doctor Who story to be written and produced by Moffat while he was the show's executive producer and chief writer. After the special's broadcast, Moffat was succeeded as executive producer and showrunner by Chris Chibnall.

== Plot ==
Wandering back to his TARDIS through the South Pole in 1986, the First Doctor refuses to regenerate. He encounters the Twelfth Doctor outside his own TARDIS in a similar state of mind. The pair are approached by a confused and injured First World War British captain, displaced from 1914 while in a gun-point stalemate with a German soldier. The three are taken into a large spaceship. Inside, they meet with Bill Potts, but the Twelfth Doctor doubts she is the real Bill. Upon encountering the ship's glass-like holographic pilot, they are offered freedom in exchange for the Captain returning to the moment of his death. Refusing to allow the Captain to die, they escape and take the First Doctor's TARDIS to the planet Villengard.

Alone, the Twelfth Doctor meets with the rogue Dalek Rusty, who grants them access to the Dalek Hivemind. The Doctor learns that the pilot and its ship, known as Testimony, are designed to extract people from their timelines at the moment of their death, and archive their memories into glass avatars. Bill is revealed to be an avatar. Seeing no evil to fight, the Doctors agree to return the Captain to his timeline. Upon arrival, the Captain asks the Doctors to keep an eye on his family, introducing himself as Archibald Hamish Lethbridge-Stewart. As time resumes, the Doctors watch as soldiers on both sides begin singing "Silent Night". The Twelfth Doctor explains to the First that he deliberately shifted the Captain's timeline forward to the start of the Christmas truce, to ensure his life would be spared.

The First Doctor informs the Twelfth that he is now prepared to regenerate and says his goodbyes before returning to his TARDIS. He returns to the South Pole to regenerate into his second incarnation. Now alone with Bill's avatar, the Twelfth Doctor adamantly contends she is not really Bill, but she argues that memories are what defines a person, and restores his erased memories of Clara Oswald. The Doctor then returns to the TARDIS and decides to regenerate, imparting some personal advice to his next incarnation. After regenerating, the Thirteenth Doctor is delighted by her new appearance. The TARDIS suffers multiple system failures due to damage caused by the delayed regeneration. As the time rotor and the console room explode, the Doctor falls out of the tumbling TARDIS, which dematerialises as she plummets to Earth below.

== Production ==
=== Writing ===
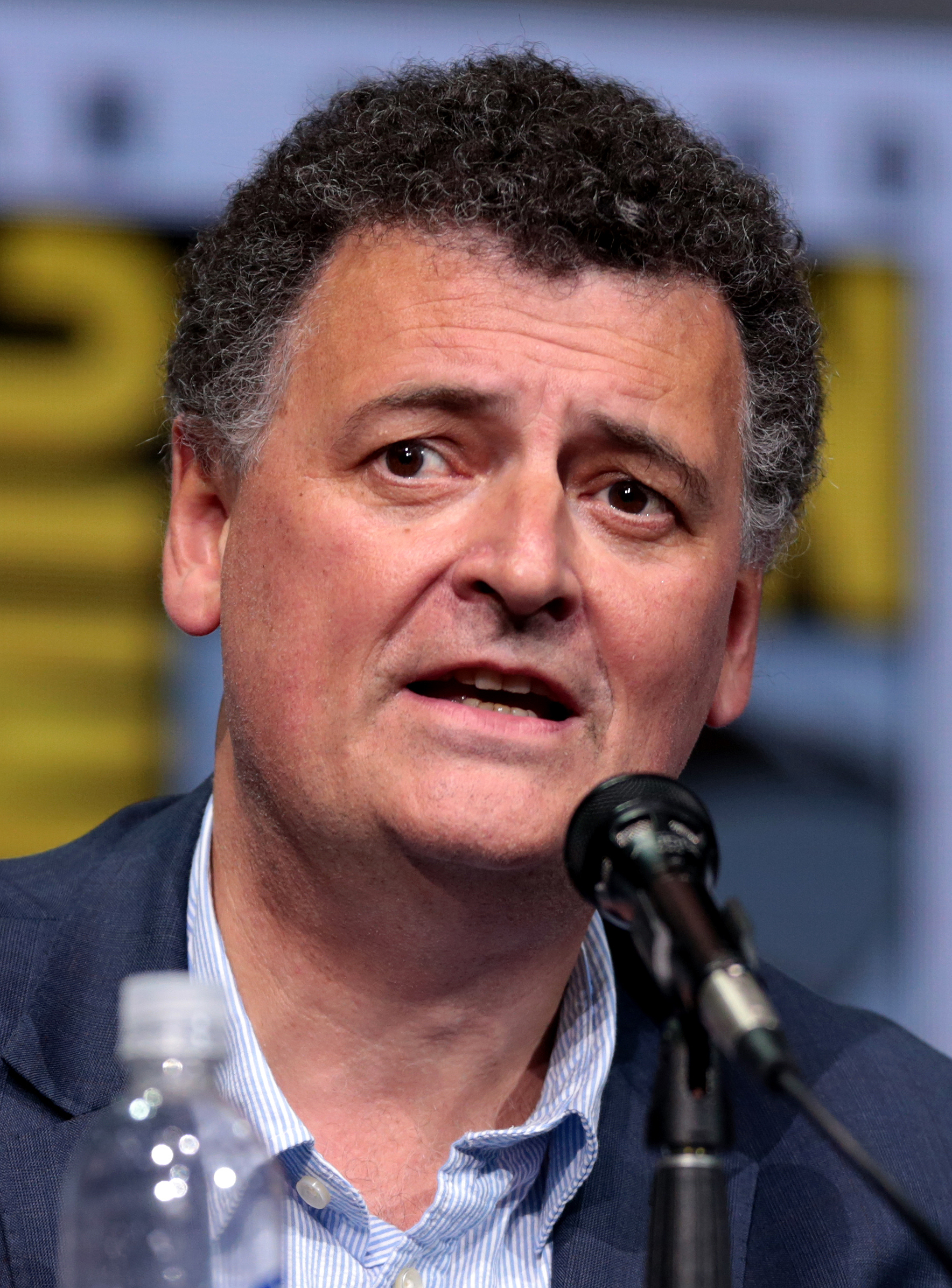
"Twice Upon a Time" was Steven Moffat's last Doctor Who episode as showrunner.

"Twice Upon a Time" was the last Doctor Who episode written by Steven Moffat as showrunner; he returned in 2024 to write an episode for series 14. As with the previous change of showrunners, incoming showrunner Chris Chibnall wrote the final moments of the episode, so as to allow him to write Whittaker's first lines on the show. This happened in the 2010 special "The End of Time", when Moffat took over for Russell T Davies in the final moments of the episode, writing Matt Smith's first words as the Eleventh Doctor.

In January 2016, Moffat announced that he would step down as the programme's showrunner after the tenth series, to be replaced by Chibnall beginning with the eleventh series in 2018, but a 2017 Christmas special was not mentioned in the plans at that time. The change in showrunners almost caused the annual episode to be cancelled, as Moffat planned to leave after the tenth series finale and Chibnall did not want to begin his run with a Christmas special. When he learned of Chibnall's plans, Moffat elected to stay long enough to produce one final episode, as he was concerned that the show would lose the 25 December slot in the future if it missed a year. As a result, he had to rewrite his plans for the tenth series finale to allow Capaldi to appear in one more episode.

In an interview following the episode's broadcast, Gatiss said he cried at the thought of playing the Brigadier's grandfather when he finished reading the script. However, it was reported following broadcast that the Haisman Literary Estate was pursuing legal action against the BBC regarding the character. Haisman's granddaughter made a public statement that this was not the case. Ultimately, they asserted their control of the backstory of the Brigadier, stating that Archibald was actually the Brigadier's great-uncle who appeared in Night of the Intelligence.

The episode features several call backs and references to previous episodes of the programme. Reportedly Derek Martinus, the director of The Tenth Planet, cut a line from the original script which suggested that the Doctor was refusing to undergo the regeneration process. Moffat decided to use this scrapped plotline as the basis for the story.

=== Casting ===
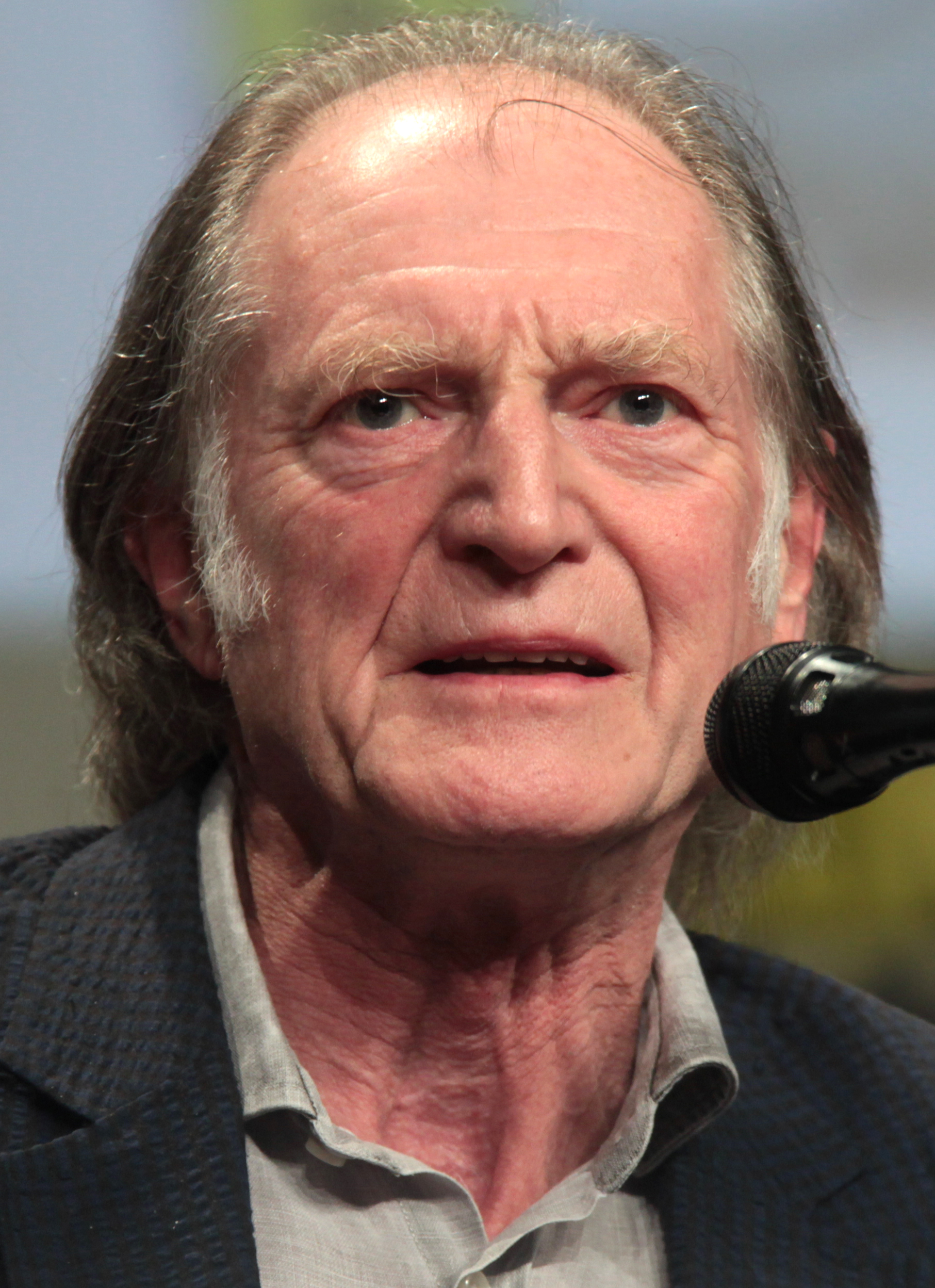
David Bradley portrayed the First Doctor, having previously portrayed William Hartnell in An Adventure in Space and Time.

On 30 January 2017, Peter Capaldi confirmed that the tenth series would be his last as the Twelfth Doctor, and that he was set to leave after the 2017 Christmas special. The episode also sees the introduction of Jodie Whittaker as the Thirteenth Doctor, whose casting was announced on 16 July 2017.

David Bradley appears as the First Doctor, having previously portrayed original actor William Hartnell in the 2013 docudrama An Adventure in Space and Time. This makes him the third actor to play the role in the television programme, after Hartnell and Richard Hurndall (in 1983's "The Five Doctors"). Bradley previously played Solomon in the 2012 episode "Dinosaurs on a Spaceship". Bradley later voiced the First Doctor in many audio dramas for Big Finish Productions alongside his co-stars from An Adventure in Space and Time.

The first trailer for the episode was shown during the 2017 San Diego Comic-Con, revealing the return of Polly, a companion from the end of William Hartnell's tenure as the First Doctor, portrayed by Lily Travers, and Pearl Mackie as Bill Potts. Also confirmed were appearances by Toby Whithouse, writer of seven episodes between 2006 and 2017, and Mark Gatiss, writer of nine episodes between 2005 and 2017, marking his fourth acting appearance in the series, playing a character credited as The Captain.

It was later confirmed that Ben Jackson, a companion of the First and Second Doctors, who served alongside Polly, would also feature in the episode and that he would be played by former Hollyoaks cast member Jared Garfield. Hartnell, Anneke Wills and Michael Craze appeared as the First Doctor, Polly and Ben, respectively through archive footage. Nikki Amuka-Bird voices the "Glass Woman".

Around 100 extras were on set for the scenes depicting World War I. The episode includes a cameo appearance by Jenna Coleman as Clara Oswald, as the Doctor's memories of Clara, lost during "Hell Bent", are restored. The scene was the last to be filmed for the episode and while Coleman was willing to come back to film, timing between the filming of this special and her work in Victoria was difficult to arrange. Moffat noted the irony of Coleman’s scene being the last to be shot despite the frequent deaths of her character. He said, “How many times have I killed that girl off and she was right there in my last shot! It's absolutely extraordinary. The unkillable Coleman!"

=== Filming ===
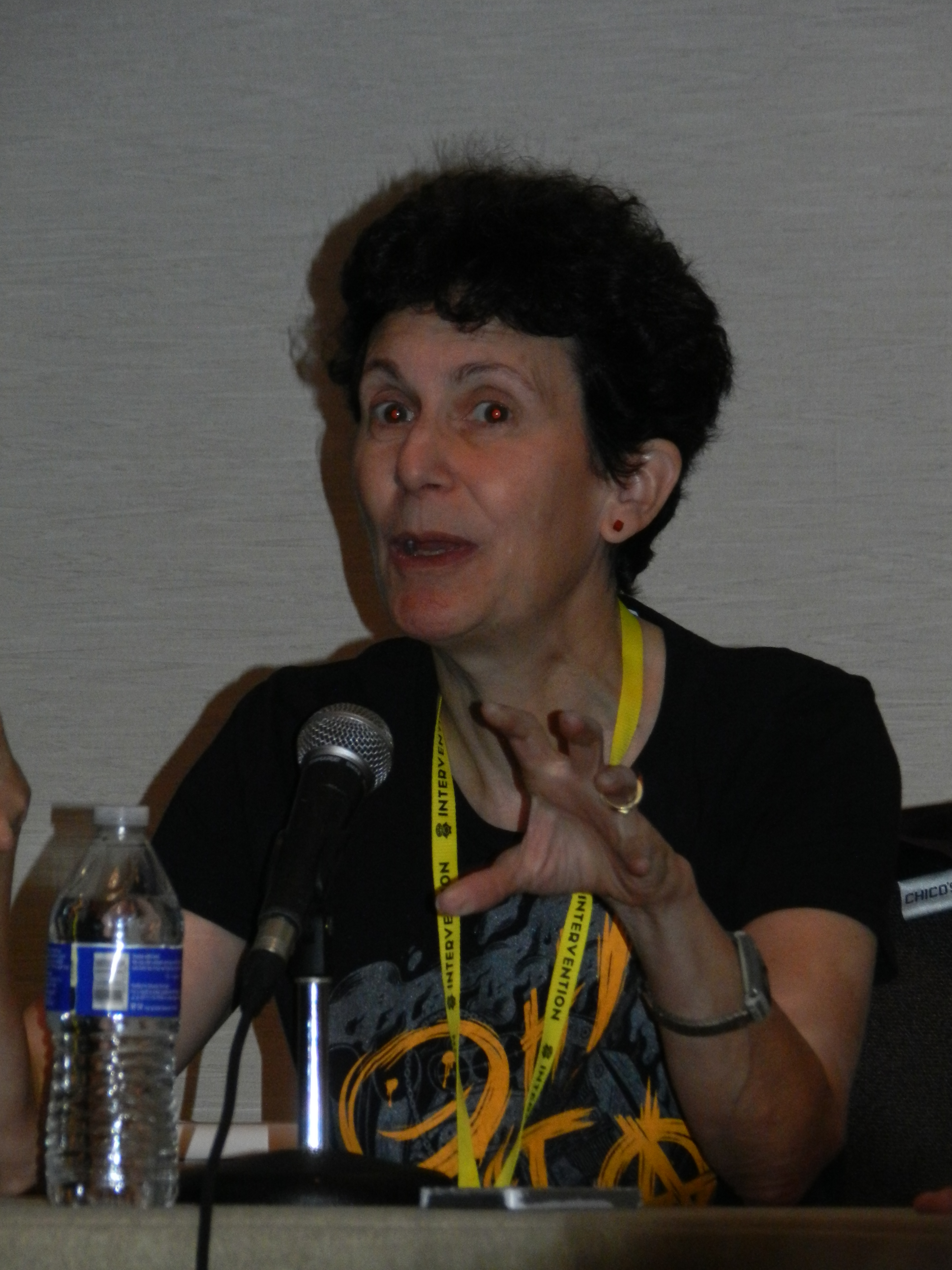
Rachel Talalay directed the episode.

The episode was directed by Rachel Talalay, who directed the two-part finale of the tenth series, "World Enough and Time" / "The Doctor Falls". The final scene of "The Doctor Falls" involving David Bradley was filmed as part of the filming of "Twice Upon a Time" in June 2017. Production for "Twice Upon a Time" started on 12 June, and concluded on 10 July. The final scene of the episode, in which Whittaker makes her debut as the Doctor, was filmed on 19 July.

Talalay recreated several scenes from The Tenth Planet; her recreations went unused in favor of archive footage. The Doctors's regeneration was shot on 10 July. Capaldi himself had input on what his regeneration scene would be like. During his speech the Doctor paraphrases philosopher Bertrand Russell when he advises his future self that "hate is always foolish and love is always wise". The original plan for the scene would not use pyrotechnics, but they were added at the request of Talalay. Following the completion of the scene, Capaldi was gifted the Twelfth Doctor's sonic screwdriver.

The recreated set of the First Doctor's TARDIS features several props from the original set. Near the end of the special, after the Doctors return to their respective TARDISes to undergo regeneration. The First Doctor's regeneration is shown, using original footage from "The Tenth Planet". Although the last episode of The Tenth Planet is one of the most sought-after missing episodes of Doctor Who, the regeneration sequence was preserved when it was used in a 1973 edition of the children's magazine programme Blue Peter.

== Broadcast and reception ==
"Twice Upon a Time" was first broadcast on BBC One on the 25th of December 2017. The episode was watched by 5.7 million viewers overnight, making it the sixth highest watched programme of the day across all channels. The episode received 7.92 million views overall, and it received an Appreciation Index of 81. It was broadcast on the same day in the United States by BBC America where it was seen by 2.2 million viewers on

=== Cinemas ===
"Twice Upon a Time" was released in cinemas in multiple countries, including Brazil on 25 December, Australia and Denmark on 26 December, and the United States and Canada on 27–28 December. The cinema release includes two bonus features: a behind-the-scenes view of the episode, and a special celebrating the tenure of Peter Capaldi as the Doctor and Steven Moffat as showrunner and lead writer.

=== Critical reception ===
Professional ratings
Aggregate scores
Source	Rating
Rotten Tomatoes (Average Score)	7.55
Rotten Tomatoes (Tomatometer)	88%
Review scores
Source	Rating
The A.V. Club	A−
Entertainment Weekly	A
IndieWire	C+
IGN	9.5
Vulture	5/5 stars
Radio Times	3/5 stars
The Daily Telegraph	2/5 stars
Daily Mirror	4/5 stars
Starburst	7/10

"Twice Upon a Time" received generally positive reviews, with praise given to the performances. 88% of 25 critic reviews are positive on Rotten Tomatoes, with an average rating of 7.6/10. The site's consensus reads "Doctor Who: Twice Upon a Time pays gratifying homage to the outgoing Doctor while marking a thoughtful, warm and funny passing of the torch to a new era in the franchise."

Writing for IGN Scott Collura praised the episode particularly the final moments featuring the regeneration. Collura felt that the episode improved the ending of "The Doctor Falls" as well as The Tenth Planet. He also praised the casting of Mark Gatiss as the Captain feeling that he "provides the perfect element of humanity required for a Doctor Who story". Entertainment Weekly's Dana Schwartz also praised Gatiss as well as the closing moments of the episode. Writing for Vulture Ross Ruediger praised the episode's use of nostalgia and how it concluded the Twelfth Doctor's character arc. Ruediger also felt that the episode was an improvement on the previous regeneration episode, "The Time of the Doctor".

Michael Hogan offered a negative review for The Daily Telegraph, criticising Moffat's writing and concluding that viewers "would have been left scratching their heads in bafflement. It was self-indulgent, overcomplicated and, most unforgivably, frequently boring."

Some commentators noted the depiction of the First Doctor, who is portrayed as displaying a sexist attitude. Moffat said that Hartnell's Doctor was "not progressive. Without being too outrageous I think we have re-created that version of Hartnell's Doctor, with all the 1960s political incorrectness in place." Den of Geek's Pete Dillon-Trenchard reported that this was a controversial aspect of the episode, even in the pre-publicity, but they "found it hard to find any examples of sexism as egregious as the ones shown here." Patrick Mulkern of Radio Times thought Moffat's characterisation for the First Doctor would make viewers "cavil that his character has been revised, made to seem more old-fashioned than he was", but felt it highlighted the changing of attitudes and how far the Doctor had developed. Kaite Welsh called the writing of the First Doctor's character as "frankly uncomfortable, not to mention a shoddy rewrite of a good character", noting that Hartnell reportedly rewrote lines that minimised Polly's importance during his tenure.

Screen Rant's Connor Shelton cited "Twice Upon a Time" as the worst multi-Doctor story, criticising the story's execution, focus on the Twelfth Doctor and Bill, and panned the First Doctor's writing as "character assassination". Also writing for Screen Rant, Edward Clearly ranked the episode as the worst Doctor Who Christmas Special, praising Capaldi's performance and the two Doctors' "interesting regeneration parallels", but panning the "loose plot" and Moffat's "odd" characterization of the First Doctor.

The episode was a finalist in the category of Best Dramatic Presentation, Short Form for the 2018 Hugo Awards. At the 44th Saturn Awards it was nominated for Best Television Presentation.

== Home media ==
Twice Upon a Time
- Author: Paul Cornell
- Cover artist: Anthony Dry
- Series: Doctor Who book: Target novelisations
- Publisher: BBC Books
- Publication date: 5 April 2018
- Pages: 224
- ISBN: 978-1-785-94330-0

"Twice Upon a Time" was released on DVD and Blu-ray in Region 2 on 22 January 2018, in Region 4 on 7 February 2018, and in Region 1 on 13 February 2018. The episode was later released in Ultra HD Blu-ray format. It was released in North America on 25 September 2018 and in the UK on 24 September 2018.

=== In print ===
Paul Cornell adapted the story into a novelisation as part of the Target Collection. It was released in paperback by BBC Books on 5 April 2018, with a digital edition released on the same day. In June 2018, an audiobook version, read by Gatiss, was released.

== Bibliography ==
- Ainsworth, John (2019). Wright, Mark (ed.). "World Enough and Time / The Doctor Falls - Twice Upon a Time". Doctor Who: The Complete History. 89 (276). Panini Comics, Hachette Partworks.
