= Martin Slavin =

English composer (1922–1988)

- Born: 19 February 1922; London, England
- Died: 25 May 1988 (aged 66); Camden, London, England

Martin Slavin (19 February 1922 – 25 May 1988) was a British composer and music director.

== Biography ==
Slavin was born in London. He served in the army as a Band Sergeant, and after demobilization formed his own seven piece band, working with musicians such as Eddie Calvert and Kenny Baker. In 1958, he had a UK #18 in Record Mirror's Top 20, as Martinas & His Music, with the song "Cha Cha Momma Brown", a take on the old party favourite "Knees Up Mother Brown".

In the 1960s, Slavin composed the musical Nancy Wake and was a prolific session musician and music arranger and composer for television and cinema. He scored such diverse films as Information Received (1961), Pit of Darkness (1961), Danger by My Side (1962), Sherlock Holmes and the Deadly Necklace (1962), Danger by My Side, The Cool Mikado (1963), The Wild Affair (1965), The Boy Cried Murder (1966) and the X-rated animated film Once Upon a Girl (1976). In 1961 he worked with Helen Shapiro on "You Don't Know" for Columbia records.

One of his music pieces, "Space Adventure" was used in the Doctor Who serial, The Tenth Planet as the Cybermen's theme. It was later used in The Moonbase, The Tomb of the Cybermen and The Web of Fear.

Slavin emigrated to Canada and then Hollywood, continuing to work on film productions such as the adult cartoon Once Upon a Girl (1976). He became a musical director on a cruise ship before returning to London in the 1980s.

Slavin was killed in a road accident on 25 May 1988, at the age of 66.

== Sources ==
- Who's Who of British Jazz by John Chilton. ISBN 0-8264-7234-6
