= The Roundheads =

1997 novel by Mark Gatiss

- Author: Mark Gatiss
- Series: Doctor Who book: Past Doctor Adventures
- Release number: 6
- Subject: Featuring: Second Doctor; Ben, Polly, and Jamie
- Set in: Period between The Macra Terror and The Faceless Ones
- Publisher: BBC Books
- Publication date: 24 November 1997
- Pages: 282
- ISBN: 0-563-40576-7
- Preceded by: Illegal Alien
- Followed by: The Face of the Enemy

The Roundheads is a BBC Books original novel written by Mark Gatiss and based on the long-running British science fiction television series Doctor Who. It features the Second Doctor, Ben, Jamie, and Polly.

== Synopsis ==
Landing in December 1648 after the end of Second English Civil War, the TARDIS crew gets involved with intrigue involving both the victorious Oliver Cromwell and the doomed Charles I.
