= Morris Barry =

British television producer (1918–2000)

- Born: Morris Randolph Barry; 9 February 1918; Northampton, Northamptonshire, England
- Died: 20 November 2000 (aged 82); Surrey, England
- Resting place: Breakspear Crematorium, Ruislip, London, England
- Occupation: Actor

Morris Randolph Barry (9 February 1918 – 20 November 2000) was an English producer and director for the BBC in the 1960s and 1970s, and also worked as an actor.

Barry made his name as a producer and director on productions such as Angels, Compact and Z-Cars, but his most impressive credit was perhaps as producer of the highly popular dramatisation of Poldark by Winston Graham.

Barry directed three Doctor Who stories during the Patrick Troughton years: The Moonbase (1967), The Tomb of the Cybermen (1967) and The Dominators (1968). He was known by the cast and crew of Doctor Who to be a somewhat strict and uncompromising director of the old school, but The Moonbase and The Tomb of the Cybermen are often spoken of as classics of 1960s Doctor Who. He was also well known for carrying a music stand to place his script on during rehearsals.

He also appeared as an actor in the Doctor Who story The Creature from the Pit in 1979, playing the scientist Tollund. His other acting credits include episodes of Are You Being Served?, Blake's 7, The Day of the Triffids, Tales of the Unexpected, All Creatures Great and Small, and Hi-de-Hi!.

Morris Barry died in 2000.
