= Ben and Polly =

Fictional characters in the TV series Doctor Who

- Doctor Who characters
- Anneke Wills and Michael Craze, as Polly and Ben respectively
- First appearance: The War Machines (1966)
- Last appearance: Twice Upon a Time (2017)
- Portrayed by: Ben: Michael Craze (1966–1967); Jared Garfield (2017); Polly: Anneke Wills (1966–1967); Lily Travers (2017)
- Voiced by: Ben: Elliot Chapman; Polly: Anneke Wills
- Duration: 1966–1967, 2017

In-universe information
- Full name: Benjamin Jackson; Polly Wright (Note: The surname "Wright" is not used on-screen, but was later adopted in spin-off material. The surname does, however, originate from the original audition script for Polly in The War Machines.)
- Nickname: Polly: Duchess
- Species: Humans
- Occupation: Ben: Navy seaman Polly: Research assistant
- Affiliation: First Doctor; Second Doctor
- Home: Earth
- Home era: 1966

Benjamin "Ben" Jackson and Polly, sometimes called Polly Wright in spin-off material, are fictional characters played by Michael Craze and Anneke Wills, in the long-running British science fiction television series Doctor Who.

Ben and Polly, both from the year 1966, were companions of the First and Second Doctors. The duo was a regular in the television programme from 1966 to 1967, appearing in 9 stories (36 episodes). Only one serial featuring the pair, their first appearance in The War Machines, is currently complete in the BBC archive. However, all but two of their missing stories (The Smugglers and The Highlanders) have seen DVD release, with both official animation and photo reconstructions utilizing the original surviving audio filling in the gaps. The characters returned in the 2017 Christmas special "Twice Upon a Time", portrayed by Jared Garfield and Lily Travers.

== Fictional character biography ==
=== Television ===
Ben and Polly first appeared in the First Doctor serial The War Machines, where Polly plays the role of Professor Brett's secretary. Brett develops the artificial intelligence known as WOTAN, and Polly meets the Doctor (William Hartnell) and Dodo (Jackie Lane) when they come to investigate it. Polly and Dodo became friends and she takes her to a London nightclub called the Inferno, where they meet Ben Jackson, a Royal Navy Able Seaman serving aboard HMS Teazer. Polly and Dodo try to cheer Ben up. When Polly is accosted by another patron in the Inferno, Ben comes to her rescue. Eventually, Ben and Polly aid the Doctor in his fight against WOTAN when the computer tries to take over the world. Ben and Polly inform the Doctor of Dodo's decision to stay in 1966 and accidentally get carried away in the TARDIS when they try to return Dodo's key to the time machine.

Polly, in contrast to Dodo, is a more sophisticated and hip young woman of the 1960s — vivacious, attractive, and alternately shy and aggressive. She and Ben make an odd couple but she is receptive to Ben's protective urges, and he in turn finds her elegant and posh, giving her the nickname "Duchess". Polly is present with Ben when the Doctor regenerates for the first time into a new form (Patrick Troughton), and they continue to travel with him. In The Highlanders (1966–67), Polly and Ben are joined on the TARDIS by Jamie McCrimmon (Frazer Hines). Eventually, the TARDIS finds its way back to 1966 London (in The Faceless Ones) on the very day Ben and Polly had left (although about a year had passed for them). They decide to remain behind to resume their lives without disruption as the Doctor and Jamie travel on.

What happens to the duo after their return to Earth is not certain. The Doctor seems to think that Ben will become an Admiral and that Polly will look after Ben, but it is unclear if this is a prediction or simply wishing them well. In The Sarah Jane Adventures story Death of the Doctor (2010), Sarah Jane mentions that Polly is now working at an orphanage in India with Ben.

Ben and Polly appear in the 2017 Doctor Who Christmas special "Twice Upon a Time", portrayed by Jared Garfield and Lily Travers respectively. The episode's plot involves the events of The Tenth Planet.

=== Other media ===
In the spin-off short story "Mondas Passing" by Paul Grice (in the anthology Short Trips) which takes place in 1986, it is revealed that Ben and Polly have gone their separate ways and married other people. In the short story "That Time I Nearly Destroyed The World Whilst Looking For a Dress" by Joseph Lidster (in the Big Finish Productions anthology Short Trips: Past Tense), it is shown that by 1999 Polly is divorced and has an estranged son named Mikey. However, Polly and Ben meet again at the end of that story and admit their love for each other.

== Development ==
During March 1966 the BBC began researching cadet recruitment in the Royal Navy, as background for a proposed recurring character. On the 15th of that month the original outline for The War Machines (at that time untitled) was drafted by Pat Dunlop, and included a sailor named Richard, intended to become a regular companion to replace the departing Peter Purves (Steven). In re-writes this character was renamed Ben, with the companion Dodo (who took part in the whole story in this outline) now being written out half way through script—and her role given to a new character, Polly. These changes seem to have been made by the 21st. The two characters were conceived to be more down-to-earth than previous companions, and would provide contrast to one-another.

A spring 1966 internal document described Ben as a "realist, down to Earth, solid, capable and cautious. Inclined, on occasions, to be shy. [...] He is slow to anger but somewhat thick-skinned about his cockney accent."

Both Anneke Wills and Michael Craze had been cast in the roles of Polly and Ben by at least the 4 May 1966, with Craze sending some of his own biographical ideas to Innes Lloyd on that date. The casting was made public in a press release on 20 June. Unable to find immediate accommodation in London Craze moved temporarily in with Wills and Michael Gough for six weeks where they got to know one-another.

Polly was never given a last name in the series. According to production notes, she was meant to be Polly Wright, but this was not used to avoid confusion with the Doctor's earlier companion Barbara Wright. In The Faceless Ones, a double of Polly is named Michelle Leuppi; an apparent mishearing of this and misinterpretation of the context led to some reference works giving Polly the last name of "Lopez". In the Virgin Missing Adventures novel Invasion of the Cat-People by Gary Russell, Wright is expressly given as Polly's last name, as it was supposedly given in Gerry Davis's character breakdown and audition script sample when, as story editor, he and producer Innes Lloyd created Ben and Polly in 1966.

== List of appearances ==
=== Television ===
Season 3

- The War Machines

Season 4

- The Smugglers
- The Tenth Planet
- The Power of the Daleks (Note: Ben appears in all but episode five, while Polly appear in all but episode four)
- The Highlanders
- The Underwater Menace
- The Moonbase
- The Macra Terror
- The Faceless Ones (Note: Ben and Polly do not appear in episodes three, four, and five)

Series 10

- "Twice Upon a Time"

=== Novels ===
Virgin Missing Adventures

- Invasion of the Cat-People by Gary Russell

Past Doctor Adventures

- The Murder Game by Steve Lyons
- The Roundheads by Mark Gatiss
- Dying in the Sun by Jon de Burgh Miller
- Ten Little Aliens by Stephen Cole

Telos Doctor Who novellas

- Wonderland by Mark Chadbourn

=== Short stories ===
- "Mondas Passing" by Paul Grice (Short Trips)
- "That Time I Nearly Destroyed the World Whilst Looking For a Dress" by Joseph Lidster (Short Trips: Past Tense)
- "Pluto" by Dale Smith (Short Trips: The Solar System)
- "Do You Dream in Colour" by Gary Russell (Short Trips: The Ghosts of Christmas)
- "The Slave War" by Una McCormack (Short Trips: The Quality of Leadership)

=== Comics ===
- "The Tests of Trefus" by David Brian (Doctor Who Annual 1968)
- "World Without Night" by David Brian (Doctor Who Annual 1968)
- "Food for Thought" by Nicholas Briggs and Colin Andrew (Doctor Who Magazine 218–220)

=== Audios ===
- Resistance
- The Three Companions
- The Forbidden Time
- The Five Companions (with the Fifth Doctor)
- The Selachian Gambit
- The House of Cards
- The Light at the End (cameo)
- The Yes Men
- The Forsaken
- Lost and Found
- The Mouthless Dead
- Falling
- The Bonfires of the Vanities
- The Plague of Dreams
- The Night Witches
- The Outliers
- The Morton Legacy
