= Hugh David =

British actor and television director

Hugh David (17 July 1925 – 11 September 1987) was a British actor and television director.

His directorial credits include Compact, Z-Cars, The Pallisers and Doctor Who, for which he directed two stories in the Patrick Troughton era. While still an actor in the early 1960s, he had actually been suggested for the leading role in Doctor Who by his friend, the producer Rex Tucker, but this was vetoed by incoming series producer Verity Lambert who considered the actor too young for the role. David later stated that as he had recently starred in the Granada Television series Knight Errant and disliked the high public profile it brought him, he would not have been keen to take on another leading role anyway. He died in London aged 62, leaving his widow, the actress Wendy Williams.

== Selected filmography ==
- How Green Was My Valley (1960)
- Wives and Daughters (1971)
- The Clifton House Mystery (1978)

== Citations ==
- The Stage, "Obituaries", 1 October 1987, Page 25.
