= Innes Lloyd =

Welsh television producer and actor (1925–1991)

- Born: George Innes Llewelyn Lloyd; 24 December 1925; Penmaenmawr, Wales
- Died: 23 August 1991 (aged 65); Richmond, London, England
- Occupations: Television producer, actor
- Known for: Producing Doctor Who and Talking Heads
- Spouse: Susan Fox (m. 1966)
- Children: 2

George Innes Llewelyn Lloyd (24 December 1925 – 23 August 1991) was a Welsh television producer and actor. He had a long career as a producer in BBC drama, which included series such as Doctor Who and Talking Heads.

== Early life and career ==
George Innes Llewelyn Lloyd was born on Christmas Eve in the town of Penmaenmawr, Wales. Lloyd received his education from Ellesmere College in Shropshire, England. His ambition was to join the Royal Navy, but was denied entry to Dartmouth Naval College due to his poor eyesight. The outbreak of World War II finally allowed Lloyd to volunteer in the Navy.

=== Acting career ===
Following his naval service, Lloyd decided to pursue acting. He studied at the Central School of Speech and Drama, graduating in 1949. That Christmas, he played the role of the Chinese Emperor in a version of Aladdin produced in Ashford, Kent. The following year, Lloyd joined a repertory company called the Palace Players, based at the Gaiety Theatre in Douglas, on the Isle of Mann. Throughout 1950, he performed twice every night in a variety of shows, including The Light of Heart by Emlyn Williams and See How They Run by Phillip King. In 1951, Lloyd joined the rep comedy at the David Garrick Theatre in Lichfield, appearing alongside Lionel Jeffries in a variety of plays, such as The Recruiting Officer and The Bishop Misbehaves. In August of that year, Lloyd played a doctor in the John Perry melodrama A Man About the House, earning him a positive review in the Lichfield Mercury. In February 1952, Lloyd gave his first performance on London's West End, appearing in the first run of the murder-thriller Silent Warning at the Watergate Theatre.

== Television career ==
Intending to work as a producer or director, Lloyd wished to join the BBC, which he attributed to his love of organisation. He joined the BBC Presentation Department in 1953, and soon moved into Outside Broadcast. As an outside broadcast producer he supervised live coverage of many important sporting events such as the 1959 Wimbledon Championships, the 1960 Eurovision Song Contest, a World Cup qualifying match between England and Luxembourg, and Winston Churchill's state funeral. He also produced several series of Top of the Form, an inter-school quiz championship.

Lloyd believed Outside Broadcast was becoming overly specialised and was no longer offering the variety he desired, and after producing coverage of the 1965 Wimbledon Championships, he requested a move into drama. He started by directing two episodes each of The Flying Swan, the football drama United!, and the soap opera The Newcomers.

=== Doctor Who ===
In January 1966, BBC Head of Drama Sydney Newman offered Lloyd his first job as a drama producer, taking over on the popular science fiction series Doctor Who. Lloyd recalled telling Newman "I don't like science fiction at all - in fact I dislike it intensely. " Newman responded by telling Lloyd that he would either produce the series or leave the BBC, prompting Lloyd to accept.

Lloyd began his tenure as Doctor Who's third producer by overseeing the production of scripts that his predecessor John Wiles and former story editor Donald Tosh had commissioned. Lloyd and the newly hired story editor Gerry Davis oversaw these serials, The Celestial Toymaker and The Gunfighters, which both ran in 1966. The former saw the Doctor, the series' protagonist, trapped in a fantastical universe by the title villain, while the latter was a historical set around the Gunfight at the O.K. Corral in 1881. Newman complained to Lloyd that The Gunfighters was "awful," prompting Lloyd to give more consideration to the quality of future scripts.

Lloyd wished to imbue future serials with a greater sense of realism and modernity, planting "everything as much as possible in the present day", and hiring Kit Pedler as an unofficial scientific advisor. He also oversaw the replacement of astronaut Steven Taylor and orphan Dodo Chaplet as the companions of the Doctor, introducing contemporary Ben Jackson and Polly Wright in their place. He aimed to make the series more action-orientated and less whimsical than it had been previously: this included the introduction of recurring monsters the Cybermen, the Ice Warriors and the Yeti, and the termination of the purely historical stories prominent in the show's first three seasons.

During Lloyd's tenure as producer the concept of regeneration was introduced, whereby the lead actor in the programme might be replaced. This arose following continuing health difficulties with William Hartnell as the lead actor. Lloyd and story editor Gerry Davis decided the Doctor would have the power to change his body when it became worn out or seriously injured. Whereas John Wiles, the previous producer to Lloyd, had intended to replace Hartnell with another actor but playing the same character, Lloyd and Davis elected to change the entire personality and appearance of the Doctor. They eventually cast character actor Patrick Troughton, having previously considered another actor, Peter Jeffrey, as well as Peter Cushing, who had played Dr. Who in two films. Troughton first appeared in November 1966 after the changeover from Hartnell had been seen at the end of the story The Tenth Planet.

Lloyd intended to stay on Doctor Who for only a year, but despite his initial misgivings he found it offered exactly the variety he could no longer get in Outside Broadcast. Ultimately he stayed for two years, handing over to Peter Bryant after The Enemy of the World. (Bryant had already produced the earlier serial The Tomb of the Cybermen as a test piece to show he was capable of taking over as producer.)

=== Thirty Minute Theatre and anthology series ===
At the start of 1968, Innes Lloyd departed Doctor Who to take over on BBC2's short plays strand, Thirty-Minute Theatre, which had been created by Sydney Newman principally as a vehicle for new writing, and was then in the middle of its third series. Lloyd used the strand to experiment with bringing Outside Broadcast techniques to drama, shooting several plays on location using OB cameras: previously the location work in BBC dramas had been shot on film. Notable entries produced by Lloyd included 1969's Conversation at Night, starring John Gielgud and Alec Guinness and directed by Rudolph Cartier. Lloyd produced 119 plays for Thirty Minute Theatre before departing in 1971.

The rest of Lloyd's BBC career would be dominated by single plays and anthology series. The following year he produced a supernatural anthology for BBC2, Dead of Night, which ran to seven episodes: an eighth edition, The Stone Tape by Nigel Kneale, was made by the same production team as a standalone without the Dead of Night banner, and broadcast on Christmas Day 1972 to great acclaim. In 1973 Lloyd produced Sporting Scenes, an anthology of six plays themed around sport, from writers including Andrew Davies and Alan Plater, and he produced the entire spring 1976 run of BBC2 Playhouse, as well as several subsequent plays for the strand.

=== Collaborations with Alan Bennett ===
In 1972 Lloyd produced the poignant comedy A Day Out, Alan Bennett's first play for television. Bennett had written full-length pieces for theatre, but in television he was known as a writer and performer of sketches. He later recalled Lloyd telling him A Day Out had wound up "in a pool of scripts... because the head of script had said it was no good." Subsequently Lloyd became, in his words, "the dead letter box for Alan Bennett's television plays, none of them commissioned but delivered in first-draft form."

Their working relationship continued until Lloyd's death in 1991, taking in landmark productions such as the first series of Talking Heads. Bennett later recalled no-one thought a series of monologues would work, and it was only due to Lloyd's faith in Bennett's writing that it got made at all. In An Englishman Abroad, directed by John Schlesinger, Bennett told the remarkable true story of the chance meeting between actress Coral Browne (playing herself) and spy Guy Burgess (Alan Bates) in Moscow in 1958, while A Question of Attribution, by the same writer-director-producer team, was a spiritual sequel, showing the radically different fate of Surveyor of the Queen's Pictures and fellow traitor Anthony Blunt. The latter film was finished shortly before Lloyd's death, and he concealed his terminal cancer from his BBC bosses in order to continue working. Bennett remarked that his relationship with the BBC was never the same after Lloyd died.

=== Other work ===
A Day Out was directed by Stephen Frears, who had previously handled a few episodes of children's dramas before making his film debut with Gumshoe. He subsequently became an established director of one-off TV dramas, and worked with Lloyd several times, including the first episode of Sporting Scenes, a film about cricket called England, Their England, and Going Gently, starring Norman Wisdom in a rare straight role.

Another collaboration between Lloyd and Frears, an adaptation of Three Men in a Boat by Jerome K. Jerome, starred Michael Palin. Palin enjoyed working with Lloyd and later approached him with his semi-autobiographical script East of Ipswich, which was produced in 1987 for Screen Two. Palin later remembered it as one of his favourite projects, and the following year he wrote another film for Lloyd, Number 27.

As a BBC drama producer in the 1970s and 1980s, Lloyd's chosen projects were often biographical. Collaborating with authors such as Roger Milner and Don Shaw, he brought to the screen biographies from a diverse range of, often flawed, heroes ranging from Orde Wingate and Arthur "Bomber" Harris, the Campbells Donald and Malcolm, through to the first director-general of the BBC, John Reith. His work also explored notions of Englishness in the twentieth century with productions such as An Englishman's Castle (1978) starring Kenneth More, a dystopian vision of the consequence of losing the second world war.

== Personal life and death ==
Innes was one of Lloyd's two middle names as well as his mother's maiden name. He married actress Susan Fox in March 1966, six months after they met at an audition for The Flying Swan: they had two children, Guy and Joanna. He died of cancer on 23 August 1991, aged 65.

Preceded by John Wiles	Doctor Who Producer; 1966–1967	Succeeded by Peter Bryant

Preceded by Peter Bryant	Doctor Who Producer; 1967–1968	Succeeded by Peter Bryant
