= Anneke Wills =

British actress

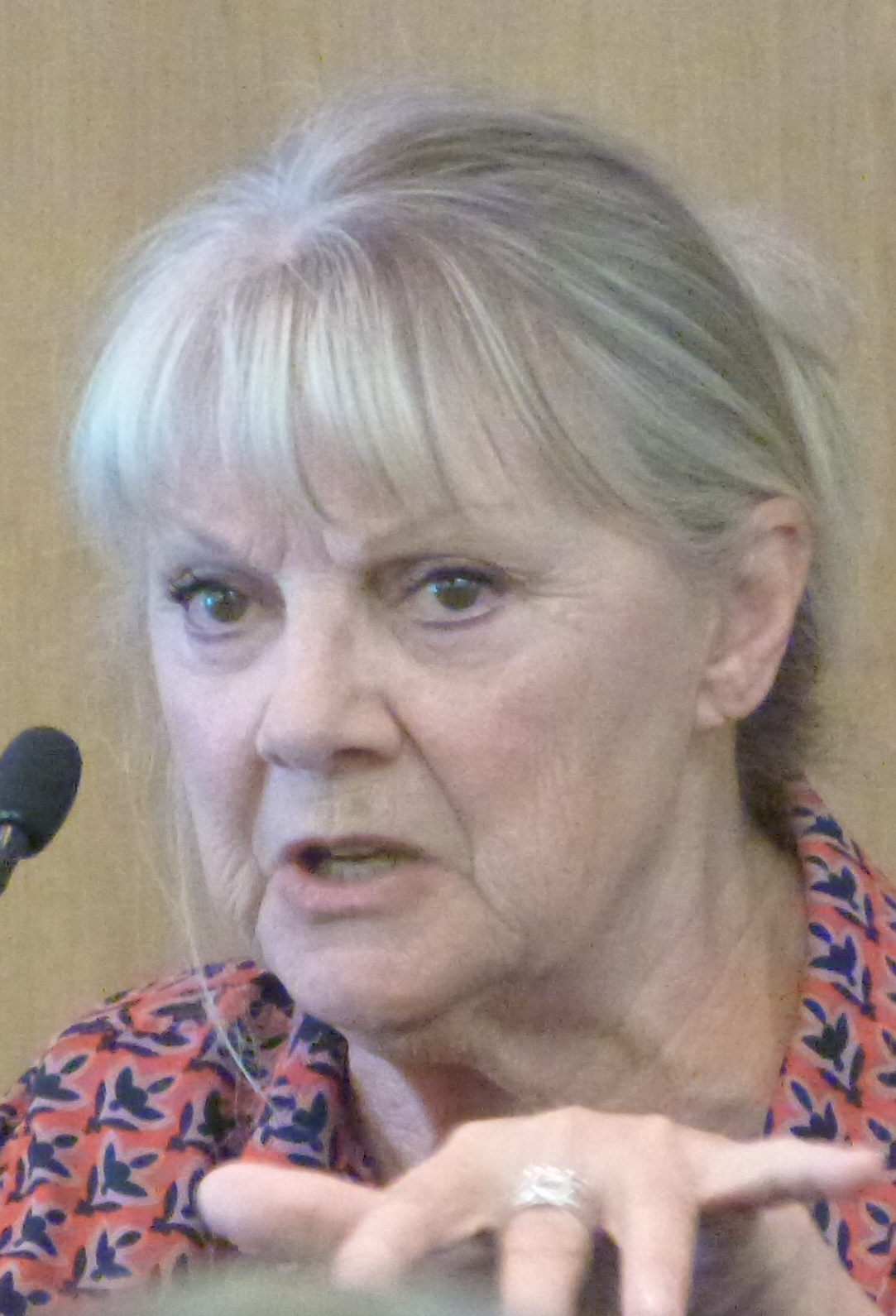
- Wills in 2018
- Born: Anna Katarina Willys; 20 October 1941 (age 85); Fulmer, Buckinghamshire, England
- Occupation: Actress
- Years active: 1952–1970, 1998–present
- Television: Doctor Who (1966–1967)
- Spouse(s): Michael Gough (m. 1965; div. 1979) Two further husbands (both divorced)
- Partner: Anthony Newley (1962–1963)
- Children: 2
- Website: www.annekewills.com

Anneke Wills (/ˈænɪkə/; born Anna Katarina Willys, 20 October 1941) is an English actress, best known for her role as the companion Polly in the long-running BBC science fiction television series Doctor Who.

== Biography ==
Wills's father, Alaric Willys, was a captain in the British Army. Her mother, Anna, was Dutch, born in Rotterdam. Anneke is the granddaughter of Richard Raymond Willis VC.

== Career ==
Deciding she wanted to be an actress she studied drama at the Arts Educational School and RADA in London and quickly became one of the busiest actresses of her generation, early roles included an appearance as Roberta in the second TV version of The Railway Children in 1957. Her other film roles included appearances in Some People (1962) and The Pleasure Girls (1965).

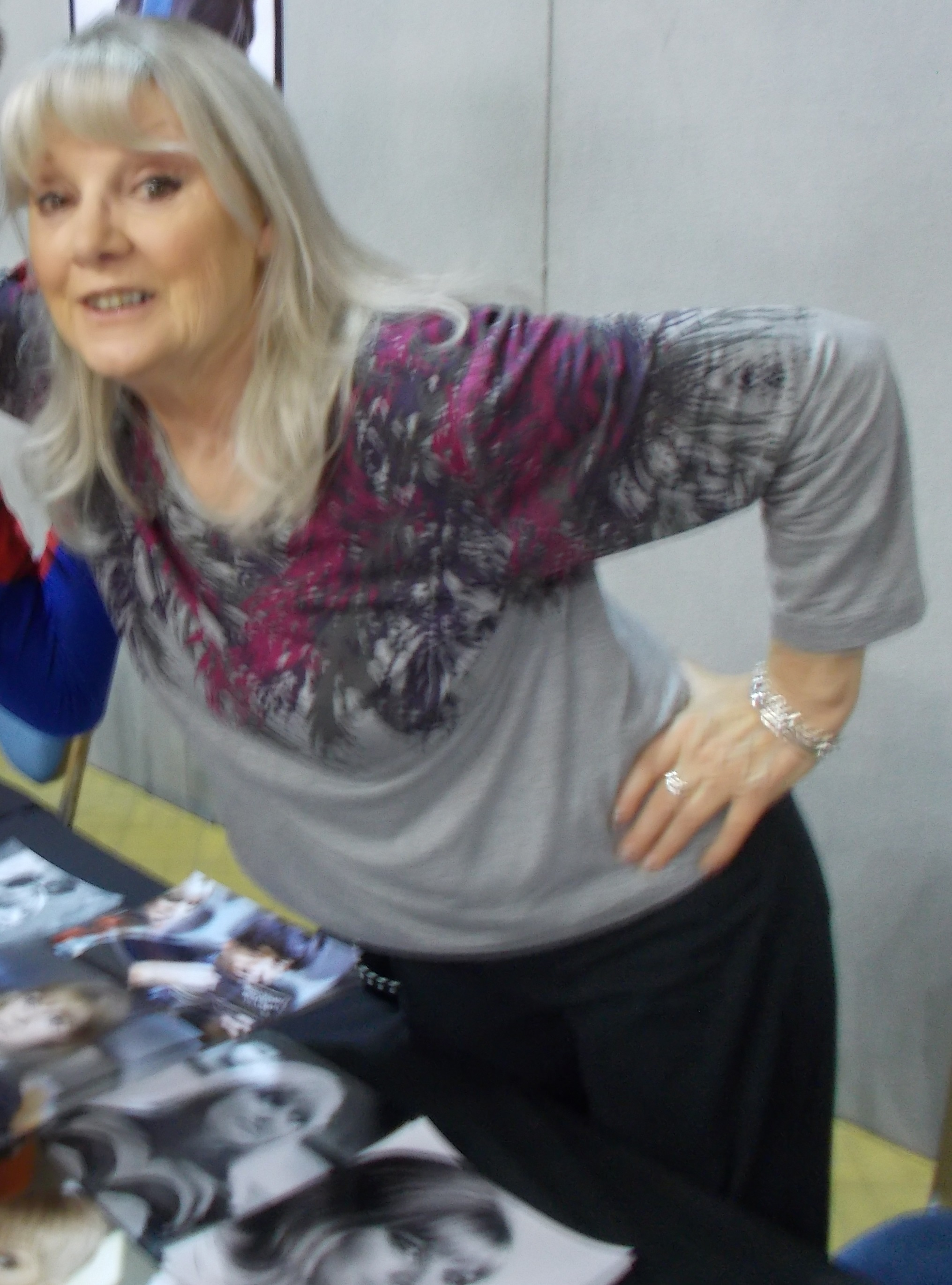
Anneke Wills at Bournemouth Comic-Con in 2016.

Her other television credits include appearances in The Avengers and as Evelyn in Strange Report (1969–70).

=== Doctor Who ===
In 1966, she took the role of Polly in Doctor Who. She appeared in the show until 1967 alongside William Hartnell and then Patrick Troughton. Her favourite story is The Smugglers.

In October 2013, she recorded an abridged version of Who's There?, a biography of Hartnell written by his granddaughter, Jessica Carney.

In November 2013, she appeared in the one-off 50th anniversary comedy homage The Five(ish) Doctors Reboot.

She has been a popular guest at Doctor Who conventions, and has been employed by the BBC and Big Finish to record various audio and DVD projects related to the show.

In 2021, Wills was approached by Doctor Who showrunner Chris Chibnall about reprising her role as Polly for the Thirteenth Doctor's final episode, "The Power of the Doctor", but was unavailable on the day of filming as she was maintaining her garden at her home in Dartmoor. "I heard it was quite brief so I'm glad I stayed and did my brambles instead," she told the Radio Times.

=== Writing ===
The first volume of her autobiography, Self Portrait, was published in 2007 by Hirst Books and a second volume, Naked, followed in 2009. Her latest book, Anneke Wills - In Focus, was published in May 2012 by Fantom Films.

== Personal life ==
At 17, she began a relationship with Anthony Newley while working on the TV series The Strange World of Gurney Slade. Newley fathered Wills's first child, but instructed her to have an abortion. Wills became pregnant for a second time and gave birth to a daughter, Polly, in 1963 but by this time Wills and Newley had separated as Wills discovered he was having an affair with Joan Collins.

During the 1960s Wills spent much of her time at the famous Troubadour Coffee Shop and the Establishment, and was part of the so-called "Chelsea Set".

In 1965, Wills married actor Michael Gough, who adopted her daughter, Polly. The couple had one son, Jasper, and divorced in 1979. In 1970, she gave up acting and moved to Norfolk, dedicating herself to motherhood and gardening. Polly died in a car crash in 1982 at the age of 19, having always thought that Gough was her biological father. Anneke left the UK in 1980 and lived in various places for 16 years afterwards, including in Belgium, Laos, Vietnam, and India in the early 1980s, in the US from 1983 to 1986, and in Canada from 1986 to 1996, before returning to the UK in 1996. She remarried twice.

In 2025, Wills was hospitalised with a broken hip after slipping and falling in her garden. "Thank god the farmers heard me calling out for help and, wrapping me in blankets as I lay on the icy ground, we all waited some hours for the ambulance to come," she wrote on Facebook. "I was whisked off to Torbay hospital with a broken hip and shoulder for ten days. I was lovingly cared for by the doctors and nurses [in what] was my first experience of the immense patience and kindness of the NHS care teams. I was humbled and grateful." Following her initial hospitalisation, she was transferred to Mapleton Community Care Centre in Newton Abbot, staying there for four weeks before returning home. "[O]nce again, there were the angels, I will always be grateful to them all. Such friends," she continued.

== Filmography ==
=== Film ===
Year	Title	Role	Notes
1954	Child's Play	Alice Nightingale	
1962	Candidate for Murder	Jacqueline	Credited as Annika Wills
1962	Some People	Anne	
1964	Nothing but the Best	Girl	
1965	The Pleasure Girls	Angela	

=== Television ===
Year	Title	Role	Notes
1954	Impostor's Gold	Sybil Hughes	TV film
1954	The House with a Secret	Robina	TV film
1955	Alibi Children	Molly Wilson	TV film
1955	Remember Jane	Jane Eyre	TV film
1955	The Prince and the Pauper	Lady Jane Grey	Episode: "Exchange"
1955	Passage of Arms	Henriette de Chamborde	TV film
1955	The Blakes	Jean Blake	All 4 episodes
1956	African Holiday	Megs Wyndham	TV film
1956	The Grove Family	Olive Green	Episode: "Olive Green"
1957	The Railway Children	Roberta	All 8 episodes
1958	From Cover to Cover	Girl	Episode: "#1.1"
1959	Don't Tell Father	Diana	2 episodes
1960	BBC Sunday-Night Play	Katrina Hoefler	Episode: "Glorious Morning"
1960	Emergency-Ward 10	Clarissa Wallace	2 episodes
1960	Probation Officer	Miss Shirley	Episode: "#1.27"
1960	Probation Officer	Miss Field	Episode: "#2.3"
1960	Probation Officer	Sheila	Episode: "#2.8"
1960	No Hiding Place	Glenda Williamson	Episode: "The Final Chase"
1960	The Strange World of Gurney Slade	Girl on Airfield	2 episodes
1961	ITV Television Playhouse	Woman in coffee bar	Episode: "Ben Spray"
1961	ITV Television Playhouse	Peggy	Episode: "Different Drum"
1961	Golden Girl	Minty	Episode: "Ward of Court"
1961	Winning Widows	Sheila	Episode: "The Young Niece"
1961	Gamble for a Throne	Kaye Chance	4 episodes
1961	ITV Play of the Week	Kathleen Short	Episode: "The Primitive"
1962	The Edgar Wallace Mystery Theatre	Jacqueline	Episode: "Candidate for Murder"
1963	The Sentimental Agent	Sarah	Episode: "All That Jazz"
1963	No Hiding Place	Dolly Fenson	Episode: "The Smoke Boys"
1963	Our Man at St. Mark's	Dorothy Maxwell	Episode: "Know of Any Reason"
1963, 1967	The Avengers	Pussy Cat/Judy	2 episodes
1965	The Likely Lads	Judith Francis	Episode: "Other Side of the Fence"
1965	ITV Play of the Week	Chris Durley	Episode: "No Baby, No Baby at All"
1966	Thirty-Minute Theatre	Julia	Episode: "Keep on Running"
1966	The Wednesday Play	Leda	Episode: "Toddler on the Run"
1966–1967	Doctor Who	Polly	36 episodes
1966	The Saint	Fran Roeding	Episode: "The Helpful Pirate"
1967	Beggar My Neighbour	Mona	Episode: "For Better, for Worse"
1969–1970	Strange Report	Evelyn McLean	All 16 episodes
2013	An Adventure in Space and Time	Party Guest	TV film
2013	The Five(ish) Doctors Reboot	Herself	TV film

=== Audio drama ===
Year	Title	Role	Notes
1998	Bernice Summerfield	Doctor Kitzinger	Big Finish Productions; Story: "Beyond the Sun"
2003-2006	Doctor Who: The Monthly Range	Nrosha, Louisa Pollard	Big Finish Productions; 4 releases
2009-2019	Doctor Who: The Companion Chronicles	Polly	Big Finish Productions; 10 releases
2011	The Five Companions	Polly	Big Finish Productions; Special release
2013	The Light at the End	Polly	Big Finish Productions; Special release
2014	Charlotte Pollard	Doctor Kitzinger	Big Finish Productions; Story: "The Fall of the House of Pollard"
2015-2019	Doctor Who: The Early Adventures	Polly	Big Finish Productions; 6 releases
2016-2022	Big Finish Short Trips	Narrator	3 releases
