= Gerry Davis (screenwriter) =

British television writer

- Born: Gerald Davis; 23 February 1930
- Died: 31 August 1991 (aged 61); Venice, California, U.S.
- Occupation: Writer

Gerald Davis (23 February 1930 – 31 August 1991) was a British television writer, best known for his contributions to the science-fiction genre. He also wrote for the soap operas United! and Coronation Street.

== Career ==
=== Doctor Who ===
From 1966 until the following year, Davis was the story editor of the BBC science-fiction series Doctor Who, for which he created the character Jamie McCrimmon and co-created the popular cybernetic monsters known as the Cybermen, who continue to make appearances in the show, having been revived in the new run. His fellow co-creator of these creatures was the programme's unofficial scientific adviser, Dr. Kit Pedler.

Davis briefly returned to writing Doctor Who in 1975, penning the original script for Revenge of the Cybermen, though the transmitted version was heavily rewritten by then script-editor Robert Holmes. Davis also adapted several of his scripts into novelisations for Target Books' Doctor Who range.

=== Doomwatch ===
Following their work on Doctor Who, Davis and Pedler teamed up in 1970 to create the science-fiction programme Doomwatch. Doomwatch ran for three seasons on BBC1 from 1970 to 1972 and spawned a novel written by Davis and Pedler, a subsequent cinema film and a 1999 revival on Channel 5.

With Pedler he wrote the science-fiction novels Mutant 59: The Plastic Eater (1971), expanded from their script for the first episode of Doomwatch; Brainrack (1974); and The Dynostar Menace (1975).

== Later work ==
In the 1980s, Davis worked in America both in television and on feature films such as The Final Countdown (1980). In late 1989, he and Terry Nation made a joint but unsuccessful bid to take over production of Doctor Who and reformat the series mainly for the American market.

== Death ==
Davis died on 31 August 1991.

== Writing credits ==
Production	Notes	Broadcaster
Coronation Street	Unknown episodes (1960)	ITV
199 Park Lane	Unknown episodes (1965)	BBC One
United!	Unknown episodes (1965)	BBC One
Doctor Who	11 episodes (1966–1967, 1975): The Tenth Planet (co-written with Kit Pedler, 1966); The Highlanders (1966); The Tomb of the Cybermen (co-written with Kit Pedler, 1967); Revenge of the Cybermen (1975)	BBC One
The First Lady	"Past Indefinite" (1968); "Print and Be Damned" (1968)	BBC One
Doomwatch	24 episodes (co-written with Kit Pedler, 1970–1971)	BBC One
Anything Can Happen	Documentary short (1973)	N/A
Vega$	"Demand and Supply" (1979); "Red Handed" (1979)	ABC
The Final Countdown	Feature film (co-written with Thomas Hunter, Peter Powell and David Ambrose, 1980)	N/A
The Hitchhiker	"Pawns" (1989)	USA Network

Preceded by Donald Tosh	Doctor Who Script Editor; 1966–67	Succeeded by Peter Bryant
