= Doctor Who season 6 =

1968–69 season of British sci-fi TV series

Doctor Who
- Season 6
- Cover art of the Region 2 DVD release for first serial of the season
- Starring: Patrick Troughton; Frazer Hines; Wendy Padbury
- No. of stories: 7
- No. of episodes: 44 (7 missing)

Release
- Original network: BBC1
- Original release: 10 August 1968 – 21 June 1969

Season chronology
- ← Previous; Season 5 Next → Season 7

The sixth season of British science fiction television series Doctor Who began on 10 August 1968 with the story The Dominators and ended Patrick Troughton's reign as the Doctor with its final story The War Games. Only 37 out of 44 episodes are held in the BBC archives; 7 remain missing. As a result, 2 serials are incomplete: only episode 2 of the 6-part story The Space Pirates still exists, while The Invasion has had its two missing episodes (episodes 1 and 4) reconstructed using animation.

== Casting ==
=== Main cast ===
- Patrick Troughton as the Second Doctor
- Frazer Hines as Jamie McCrimmon
- Wendy Padbury as Zoe Heriot

Patrick Troughton, Frazer Hines and Wendy Padbury make their final regular appearances as the Second Doctor, Jamie McCrimmon and Zoe Heriot respectively. Troughton and his fellow actors collectively decided that the workload of Doctor Who was exhausting them, and that they would soon depart from the show. From Season 7 onwards the show would never have such a high number of episodes again. The three actors remained with the show until the conclusion of the final season six serial The War Games.

Troughton reprised his role in three subsequent special stories, one of which also featured Hines.

=== Guest stars ===
Nicholas Courtney reappears as Brigadier Lethbridge-Stewart in The Invasion, last seen (as a Colonel) in The Web of Fear. He would soon make regular appearances in the programme beginning with season 7's Spearhead from Space.

John Levene makes his first appearance as Corporal Benton in The Invasion. He would continue to make regular appearances, with the character promoted to sergeant, from season 7 until season 13.

Alan Bennion makes his first of three appearances in the series playing an Ice Warrior. In this, his first appearance, he portrays Lord Slaar in The Seeds of Death.

Kevin Stoney makes his second appearance as a villain in The Invasion as Tobias Vaughn. Louise Pajo and Ronald Leigh-Hunt guest star in The Seeds of Death.

== Serials ==
Terrance Dicks took over from Derrick Sherwin as script editor from The Invasion, with Sherwin resuming the role for The Space Pirates. Derrick Sherwin took over as producer from Peter Bryant for The War Games.

Season 6 is the most complete of all the Second Doctor's seasons, with only seven episodes missing (compared with thirty-three from Season 4 and eighteen from Season 5), none of the season's stories missing in their entirety and only two stories (The Invasion and The Space Pirates) incomplete. This compares to the first two seasons of the Second Doctor from which only two complete serials (The Tomb of the Cybermen and The Enemy of the World) survive. The missing two episodes of The Invasion have since been reconstructed using animation and released on DVD.

The War Games, which was the final serial of the season, and the last of Patrick Troughton's tenure as the Doctor, was also the second longest serial up to that point, spanning 10 episodes – only the 12-part serial The Daleks' Master Plan from Season 3 was longer. Both of these would be beaten in 1986 by the 14-part season-spanning story The Trial of a Time Lord

The Dominators and The Mind Robber were both produced at the end of the fifth recording block and held over to Season 6.

No. story	No. in season	Serial title	Episode titles	Directed by	Written by	Original release date	Prod. code	UK viewers (millions)	AI
44	1	The Dominators	"Episode 1"	Morris Barry	"Norman Ashby" (Mervyn Haisman and Henry Lincoln)	10 August 1968	TT	6.1	52
44	1	The Dominators	"Episode 2"	Morris Barry	"Norman Ashby" (Mervyn Haisman and Henry Lincoln)	17 August 1968	TT	5.9	55
44	1	The Dominators	[Episode 3] (Note: This episode has no on-screen episode title.)	Morris Barry	"Norman Ashby" (Mervyn Haisman and Henry Lincoln)	24 August 1968	TT	5.4	55
44	1	The Dominators	"Episode 4"	Morris Barry	"Norman Ashby" (Mervyn Haisman and Henry Lincoln)	31 August 1968	TT	7.5	51
44	1	The Dominators	"Episode 5"	Morris Barry	"Norman Ashby" (Mervyn Haisman and Henry Lincoln)	7 September 1968	TT	5.9	53
Arriving on an irradiated island, The Doctor, Jamie and new companion Zoe Heriot find an alien craft bearing the imperious and ruthless Dominators.
45	2	The Mind Robber	"Episode 1"	David Maloney	Derrick Sherwin (uncredited)	14 September 1968	UU	6.6	51
45	2	The Mind Robber	"Episode 2"	David Maloney	Peter Ling	21 September 1968	UU	6.5	49
45	2	The Mind Robber	"Episode 3"	David Maloney	Peter Ling	28 September 1968	UU	7.2	53
45	2	The Mind Robber	"Episode 4"	David Maloney	Peter Ling	5 October 1968	UU	7.3	56
45	2	The Mind Robber	"Episode 5"	David Maloney	Peter Ling	12 October 1968	UU	6.7	49
By blowing a fluid link, the Doctor is forced to use the emergency unit to take the TARDIS away from danger and indeed out of reality itself: to the Land of Fiction. Here, he meets fictional characters, such as Rapunzel, Lemuel Gulliver and Medusa.
46	3	The Invasion	"Episode One"^{†}	Douglas Camfield	Derrick Sherwin and Kit Pedler (story)	2 November 1968	VV	7.3	55
46	3	The Invasion	"Episode Two"	Douglas Camfield	Derrick Sherwin and Kit Pedler (story)	9 November 1968	VV	7.1	53
46	3	The Invasion	"Episode Three"	Douglas Camfield	Derrick Sherwin and Kit Pedler (story)	16 November 1968	VV	7.1	54
46	3	The Invasion	"Episode Four"^{†}	Douglas Camfield	Derrick Sherwin and Kit Pedler (story)	23 November 1968	VV	6.4	51
46	3	The Invasion	"Episode Five"	Douglas Camfield	Derrick Sherwin and Kit Pedler (story)	30 November 1968	VV	6.7	52
46	3	The Invasion	"Episode Six"	Douglas Camfield	Derrick Sherwin and Kit Pedler (story)	7 December 1968	VV	6.5	56
46	3	The Invasion	"Episode Seven"	Douglas Camfield	Derrick Sherwin and Kit Pedler (story)	14 December 1968	VV	7.2	55
46	3	The Invasion	"Episode Eight"	Douglas Camfield	Derrick Sherwin and Kit Pedler (story)	21 December 1968	VV	7.0	53
After becoming invisible, the TARDIS arrives in England. While looking for a missing scientist at an electronics company, the TARDIS crew find out that the Cybermen are hidden within London's sewers and are planning an invasion.
47	4	The Krotons	"Episode One"	David Maloney	Robert Holmes	28 December 1968	WW	9.0	59
47	4	The Krotons	"Episode Two"	David Maloney	Robert Holmes	4 January 1969	WW	8.4	57
47	4	The Krotons	"Episode Three"	David Maloney	Robert Holmes	11 January 1969	WW	7.5	56
47	4	The Krotons	"Episode Four"	David Maloney	Robert Holmes	18 January 1969	WW	7.1	55
On an unnamed planet, a race called the Gonds are subject to the mysterious Krotons, unseen beings to whom they provide their brightest members as "companions".
48	5	The Seeds of Death	"Episode One"	Michael Ferguson	Brian Hayles	25 January 1969	XX	6.6	57
48	5	The Seeds of Death	"Episode Two"	Michael Ferguson	Brian Hayles	1 February 1969	XX	6.8	59
48	5	The Seeds of Death	"Episode Three"	Michael Ferguson	Brian Hayles and Terrance Dicks (uncredited)	8 February 1969	XX	7.5	55
48	5	The Seeds of Death	"Episode Four"	Michael Ferguson	Brian Hayles and Terrance Dicks (uncredited)	15 February 1969	XX	7.1	55
48	5	The Seeds of Death	"Episode Five"	Michael Ferguson	Brian Hayles and Terrance Dicks (uncredited)	22 February 1969	XX	7.6	57
48	5	The Seeds of Death	"Episode Six"	Michael Ferguson	Brian Hayles and Terrance Dicks (uncredited)	1 March 1969	XX	7.7	59
The Ice Warriors plan to destroy every living thing on Earth by making Earth more habitable for them.
49	6	The Space Pirates	"Episode One"^{†}	Michael Hart	Robert Holmes	8 March 1969	YY	5.8	57
49	6	The Space Pirates	"Episode Two"	Michael Hart	Robert Holmes	15 March 1969	YY	6.8	52
49	6	The Space Pirates	"Episode Three"^{†}	Michael Hart	Robert Holmes	22 March 1969	YY	6.4	55
49	6	The Space Pirates	"Episode Four"^{†}	Michael Hart	Robert Holmes	29 March 1969	YY	5.8	53
49	6	The Space Pirates	"Episode Five"^{†}	Michael Hart	Robert Holmes	5 April 1969	YY	5.5	56
49	6	The Space Pirates	"Episode Six"^{†}	Michael Hart	Robert Holmes	12 April 1969	YY	5.3	52
Space beacons on the space lanes are being blown up and plundered for precious argonite by a gang of space pirates led by Caven and his associate Dervish.
50	7	The War Games	"Episode One"	David Maloney	Terrance Dicks and Malcolm Hulke	19 April 1969	ZZ	5.5	55
50	7	The War Games	"Episode Two"	David Maloney	Terrance Dicks and Malcolm Hulke	26 April 1969	ZZ	6.3	54
50	7	The War Games	"Episode Three"	David Maloney	Terrance Dicks and Malcolm Hulke	3 May 1969	ZZ	5.1	53
50	7	The War Games	"Episode Four"	David Maloney	Terrance Dicks and Malcolm Hulke	10 May 1969	ZZ	5.7	50
50	7	The War Games	"Episode Five"	David Maloney	Terrance Dicks and Malcolm Hulke	17 May 1969	ZZ	5.1	53
50	7	The War Games	"Episode Six"	David Maloney	Terrance Dicks and Malcolm Hulke	24 May 1969	ZZ	4.2	53
50	7	The War Games	"Episode Seven"	David Maloney	Terrance Dicks and Malcolm Hulke	31 May 1969	ZZ	4.9	53
50	7	The War Games	"Episode Eight"	David Maloney	Terrance Dicks and Malcolm Hulke	7 June 1969	ZZ	3.5	53
50	7	The War Games	"Episode Nine"	David Maloney	Terrance Dicks and Malcolm Hulke	14 June 1969	ZZ	4.1	57
50	7	The War Games	"Episode Ten"	David Maloney	Terrance Dicks and Malcolm Hulke	21 June 1969	ZZ	5.0	58
On an alien planet, the Doctor uncovers a plot to conquer the Galaxy with brainwashed Earth soldiers, forced to fight in simulated "war games", reflecting the periods in history whence they were taken, with the aliens being aided by a renegade Time Lord called the War Chief. Joining forces with rebel soldiers, who have broken their conditioning, the Doctor and his companions foil the plot and end the fighting. The War Chief is killed when the aliens' leader, the War Lord, realises he has been plotting against him. The Doctor needs the help of the Time Lords to put things right, but risks capture for his interference across space-time and the theft of his TARDIS. The Time Lords return the soldiers to Earth, dematerialise the War Lord, erase Zoe and Jamie's memories from the points in time when they first entered the TARDIS and then return them there. They then place the Doctor on trial; who cites his many battles against the evils of the universe. Accepting this defence, the Time Lords exile him to Earth, and tell him he will change his appearance. He cries out indignantly as a forced regeneration is triggered.

^†: Episode is missing

== Production ==
Several stories were pitched for the season but scrapped. Robert Holmes submitted a story, The Aliens in the Blood, set in the 22nd century and deals with an outbreak of mutants with ESP which disrupt a spacelane. Brian Hayles pitched a story, The Lords of the Red Planet, which would have depicted the origins of the Ice Warriors, though this was scrapped. The Laired of McCrimmon, written by Mervyn Haisman and Henry Lincoln, would have seen the return of the Great Intelligence and Yeti and the departure of Jamie, though was scrapped due to copyright disputes with the writers. Dick Sharples' The Prison in Space would have depicted a female-dominated planet, as well as feature Jamie in drag and deprogramming Zoe by spanking her. The serial was rewritten multiple times during development, including to accommodate Frazer Hines' desire to leave by introducing a new companion named Nik, but the production team was unhappy with the serial, and when Sharples refused further rewrites it was replaced by The Krotons. Donald Tosh pitched a story titled The Rosemariners, and would have seen a space station's staff battling a group known as the Rosemariners. Other scrapped stories included The Dreamspinner by Paul Wheeler, The Harvesters by William Emms, and The Impersonators by Malcolm Hulke, with the latter's budget being allocated to The War Games instead.

== Broadcast ==
The entire season was broadcast from 10 August 1968 to 21 June 1969. There was a three week gap in between the broadcasts of Episode 5 of The Mind Robber and Episode 1 of The Invasion, due to the BBC's coverage of the 1968 Summer Olympics in Mexico City.

== Missing episodes ==
- The Invasion – Episodes 1 & 4 (of 8 total) (Animated recreations exist)
- The Space Pirates – Episodes 1, 3 – 6 (of 6 total)

== Home media ==
=== VHS releases ===
Season	Story no.	Serial name	Duration	Release date		
Season	Story no.	Serial name	Duration	UK	Australia	USA / Canada
6	44	The Dominators	5 × 25 min.	September 1990	February 1991	August 1994
6	45	The Mind Robber	5 × 25 min.	May 1990	September 1990	February 1994
6	46	The Invasion	6 × 25 min.	June 1993 (2 × VHS)	October 1993	June 1995
6	47	The Krotons	4 × 25 min.	February 1991	July 1991	August 1994
6	48	The Seeds of Death	1 × 150 min.	July 1985	December 1987	March 1990
6	49	The Troughton Years; The Space Pirates (Note: Episode 2)	1 × 25 min	3 July 1991	March 1992	16 January 1992
6	50	The War Games	10 × 25 min.	February 1990	June 1990	January 1992

=== Betamax releases ===
Season	Story no.	Serial name	Duration	Release date		
Season	Story no.	Serial name	Duration	UK	Australia	USA / Canada
6	48	The Seeds of Death	1 × 150 min.	July 1985	—N/a	—N/a

=== DVD and Blu-ray releases ===
All releases are for DVD unless otherwise indicated:

- ^{(D,B)} indicates a simultaneous DVD and Blu-ray release

Season	Story no.	Serial name	Duration	Release date		
Season	Story no.	Serial name	Duration	R2	R4	R1
6	44	The Dominators	5 × 25 min.	12 July 2010	2 September 2010	11 January 2011
6	45	The Mind Robber	5 × 20 min.	7 March 2005	5 May 2005	6 September 2005
6	46	The Invasion (Note: Episodes 2–3 and 5–8 of 8, animation of 1 and 4)	8 × 25 min.	6 November 2006	3 January 2007	6 March 2007
6	47	The Krotons	4 × 25 min.	2 July 2012	2 August 2012	10 July 2012
6	48	The Seeds of Death	6 × 25 min.	17 February 2003	5 May 2003	2 March 2004
6	48	The Seeds of Death (Special Edition) (Note: Only available as part of the Revisitations 2 box set in Regions 2 and 4. Only available individually in Region 1.)	6 × 25 min.	28 March 2011	5 May 2011	12 June 2012
6	49	Lost in Time, Volume 2 The Space Pirates (Note: Episode 2 of 6)	1 × 25 min.	1 November 2004 (Note: Re-released in slimmer packaging in late 2016)	2 December 2004 (Note: Re-released in slimmer packaging in July 2010)	2 November 2004
6	50	The War Games (Note: Available individually or in the Regeneration box set in Region 2. Only available individually in Regions 1 and 4.)	10 × 25 min.	6 July 2009	3 September 2009	3 November 2009
6	50	The War Games in Colour	1 × 75 min. 10 × 25 min.	21 April 2025 ^{(D,B)}	16 July 2025^{(D,B)}	24 June 2025 ^{(B)}

== In print ==
Season	Story no.	Library no. (Note: Number in Target's Doctor Who Library, if applicable)	Novelisation title	Author	Hardcover release date (Note: Published by Target's parent companies (Allen Wingate, W. H. Allen, BBC Books) unless otherwise indicated)	Paperback release date (Note: Published by Target Books (or by BBC Books under the Target Collection umbrella) unless otherwise indicated)	Audiobook	
Season	Story no.	Library no.	Novelisation title	Author	Hardcover release date	Paperback release date	Release date (Note: Unabridged from BBC Audio / AudioGo unless otherwise indicated)	Narrator
6	044	86	The Dominators	Ian Marter	19 April 1984	19 July 1984	6 September 2018	Michael Troughton
6	045	115	The Mind Robber	Peter Ling	20 November 1986	16 April 1987	6 August 2009	Derek Jacobi
6	046	98	The Invasion	Ian Marter	16 May 1985	10 October 1985	7 April 2016	David Troughton (Note: Cyberman voices performed by Nicholas Briggs)
6	047	99	The Krotons	Terrance Dicks	13 June 1985	14 November 1985	2 April 2020	Frazer|Hines
6	048	112	The Seeds of Death	Terrance Dicks	17 July 1986	4 December 1986	2 February 2023	David Troughton
6	049	147	The Space Pirates	Terrance Dicks	—N/a	15 March 1990	1 December 2016	Terry Molloy
6	050	70	Doctor Who and the War Games	Malcolm Hulke	25 October 1979	25 September 1979	1 February 2011	David Troughton

== Bibliography ==
- Ainsworth, John, ed. (2019). "Shada, Dimensions in Time, The Curse of Fatal Death and Time Crash". Doctor Who: The Complete History. 90 (90). London: Panini Comics, Hachette Partworks. ISSN 2057-6048.
- Smith, Paul (2014). The Classic Doctor Who DVD Compendium. United Kingdom: Wonderful Books. ISBN 978-0-9576062-2-7.
- Smith, Paul MC (July 2021). Based on the Popular BBC Television Serial. Wonderful Books.
- Pixley, Andrew (2003e). Hickman, Clayton (ed.). "Heroes and Villains". Doctor Who Magazine. No. Special Edition 4 (published 4 June 2003)..
- Pixley, Andrew (2003f). Hickman, Clayton (ed.). "Paradise Lost". Doctor Who Magazine. No. Special Edition 4 (published 4 June 2003)..
- Evans, Andrew (1994a). Russell, Gary (ed.). "The Rosemariners Part 1". Doctor Who Magazine. No. 210 (published 17 February 1994)..
