= The Wheel in Space =

043 – The Wheel in Space
- Doctor Who serial
- Zoe Heriot (Wendy Padbury) and the Cybermen in a promotional image for the serial

Cast
- Doctor: Patrick Troughton – Second Doctor
- Companions: Frazer Hines – Jamie McCrimmon; Wendy Padbury – Zoe Heriot
- Others: Michael Turner – Jarvis Bennett; Anne Ridler – Dr. Gemma Corwyn; Eric Flynn – Leo Ryan; Clare Jenkins – Tanya Lernov; Kenneth Watson – Bill Duggan; Kevork Malikyan – Kemel Rudkin; Michael Goldie – Elton Laleham; Derrick Gilbert – Armand Vallance; Donald Sumpter – Enrico Casali; Peter Laird – Chang; James Mellor – Sean Flannigan; Freddie Foote – Servo Robot; Jerry Holmes, Gordon Stothard – Cybermen; Peter Hawkins, Roy Skelton – Cybermen Voices (Note: Hawkins voiced the Cyber Planner.); Deborah Watling – Victoria Waterfield (Note: Watling was credited in Episode 1, though her appearance was via reused footage from Fury from the Deep.)

Production
- Directed by: Tristan de Vere Cole
- Written by: David Whitaker, from a story by Kit Pedler
- Script editor: Derrick Sherwin
- Produced by: Peter Bryant
- Executive producer: None
- Music by: Special sounds by Brian Hodgson at the BBC Radiophonic Workshop
- Production code: SS
- Series: Season 5
- Running time: 6 episodes, 25 minutes each
- Episode(s) missing: 4 episodes (1, 2, 4 and 5)
- First broadcast: 27 April 1968
- Last broadcast: 1 June 1968

Chronology
← Preceded by Fury from the Deep	Followed by → The Dominators

The Wheel in Space is the mostly missing seventh and final serial of the fifth season in the British science fiction television series Doctor Who, which originally aired in six weekly parts from 27 April to 1 June 1968. This is the fourth serial featuring the Cybermen, and marks the first appearance of Wendy Padbury as companion Zoe Heriot. In this serial, the Doctor (Patrick Troughton) and his travelling companion Jamie McCrimmon (Frazer Hines) become stranded on a seemingly abandoned spaceship. They make contact with the crew of a nearby wheel-shaped space station, only to discover that a group of Cybermen have followed them and plan to hijack the station for their invasion fleet.

This was the first serial featuring the Cybermen not written by either of the villains' creators, Kit Pedler and Gerry Davis. Due to Davis' commitments on The First Lady, Pedler's story notes were developed into the final script by David Whitaker, a veteran Doctor Who screenwriter and the programme's first story editor.

The Wheel in Space received a mixed reception, and audiences felt that the Cybermen's appearances had become repetitive. Only episodes 3 and 6 are extant; the rest were junked in the 1970s and thus are missing from the BBC's archives.

== Plot ==
The Doctor (Patrick Troughton) and Jamie McCrimmon (Frazer Hines) watch their companion Victoria Waterfield (Deborah Watling) wave goodbye on the TARDIS scanner. (Note: Victoria left the TARDIS crew at the end of the previous serial, Fury from the Deep.) A malfunction causes the fluid link of the TARDIS to explode, forcing the Doctor and Jamie to land and evacuate to avoid mercury fumes; they are marooned until more mercury is found.

They find themselves on a drifting space vessel, Silver Carrier, empty apart from a small robot. The robot detects the intruders and redirects the rocket, but the sudden course change causes the Doctor to fall and get a concussion. The robot releases a swarm of cybermat pods into space, which attach themselves to a nearby space station, known as the Wheel. Jamie signals the Wheel's crew using a vector generator. The crew rescue Jamie and the unconscious Doctor. Astrophysicist Zoe Heriot (Wendy Padbury) gives Jamie a tour of the station.

Within Silver Carrier's control room, two Cybermen report to their Cyber Planner that their Cybermats have reduced the Wheel's supply of bernalium by causing a nova in Messier 13, which will force the crew to look for more on Silver Carrier. Cybermen can then take control of the Wheel and use it as a beacon for their invasion fleet. The Doctor awakes, recognising the Cybermats and deducing that the Cybermen are involved. Two crew members visit Silver Carrier, but are hypnotised into bringing the Cybermen back to the Wheel within boxes of bernalium.

The Doctor and crew disable the Cybermats by manipulating audio frequencies, but the Doctor needs the vector generator to defeat the Cybermen. Medical officer Dr Corwyn (Anne Ridler) is killed helping Jamie and Zoe reach the airlock. Jamie and Zoe spacewalk to Silver Carrier during the meteorite storm, with the crew using the Wheel's laser to blast meteorites. They recover the vector generator and return to the Wheel, where the Doctor has found some more mercury.

The crew detect a Cyberman spaceship approaching. The Doctor and crew work together to destroy the incoming ship and defeat the two Cybermen aboard the station. The Doctor and Jamie return to the TARDIS to find that Zoe has stowed away. To warn her of dangers ahead, the Doctor presents her with visuals of the Daleks.

== Production ==
=== Writing ===
The Wheel in Space is the fourth Doctor Who story to feature the Cybermen, after The Tenth Planet (1966), The Moonbase and The Tomb of the Cybermen (both 1967). The Cybermen were created by Kit Pedler (unofficial scientific adviser to the production team) and Gerry Davis (story editor) as a replacement for the Daleks, the alien villains created by Terry Nation. Nation planned to capitalise on the Daleks' popularity by developing Dalek spin-off media, so he temporarily withdrew the villains' rights from the programme. Plans for a new Cybermen story were temporarily halted in August and September 1967 by a minor dispute over the Cybermen's rights and royalties. Pedler eventually accepted a halfshare of royalties, and in September he began developing the serial with the production team. In December, Nation was approached regarding a serial potentially featuring both Daleks and Cybermen, but he refused to allow the villains to appear together.

This was the first Cybermen serial not written by either Pedler or Davis. As Davis had left the programme to work on The First Lady, and Pedler lacked experience in writing for television, veteran Doctor Who screenwriter (and original story editor) David Whitaker was called upon to develop Pedler's notes into a finished script. The serial's working title was The Space Wheel. Pedler wanted the space station to be depicted with a degree of scientific accuracy. On 14 December, incoming story editor Derrick Sherwin formally commissioned Whitaker to write a six-part serial titled Dr Who and the Wheel in Space. It follows the "base-under-siege" format which constitutes the majority of the Second Doctor's television stories.

Not long before filming, many of the characters' names were changed by director Tristan de Vere Cole to give the space station's crew a more diverse range of nationalities. This is first time the Doctor uses the alias "John Smith", which he would often use as the Third Doctor. Jamie notices the label "John Smith & Associates" on a medical device and gives it as the Doctor's name when asked.

=== Casting ===
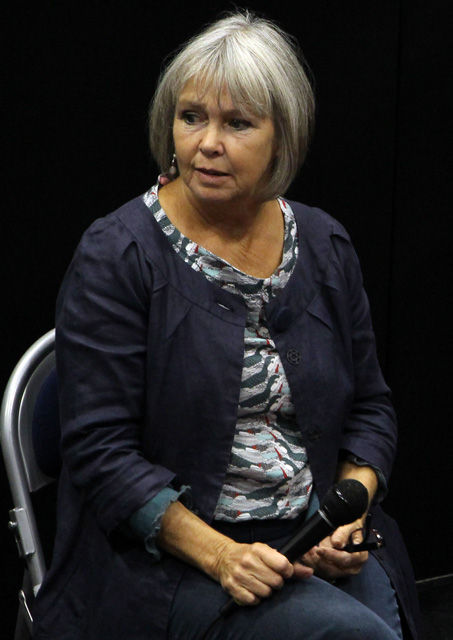
This serial marks the first appearance of Wendy Padbury (pictured in 2015) as companion Zoe Heriot.

As Deborah Watling decided not to renew her contract in late 1967, her character Victoria Waterfield was written out of the programme in Fury from the Deep. Sherwin envisaged a scientifically minded young woman to replace Victoria's role. Writer Peter Ling suggested the character be named Zoe. Interviews began in early January 1968. Following a camera test held at Lime Grove Studios during recording for The Web of Fear (1968), actress Wendy Padbury was cast as astrophysicist Zoe Heriot. Padbury admired Patrick Troughton's acting and she turned down a role in the film The Prime of Miss Jean Brodie in order to play the Doctor's new companion. Frazer Hines' then-girlfriend Susan George also auditioned for the role.

The second episode was written to accommodate Troughton's scheduled holiday. As a result, the Doctor is unconscious during the episode and played by body double Chris Jeffries. Deborah Watling's brief appearance in Episode 1 was reused footage from the end of the previous story Fury from the Deep. She received an on-screen credit.

Director Tristan de Vere Cole cast many actors he had recently worked with on Z-Cars. These include Michael Turner, Clare Jenkins, Kenneth Watson, Derrick Gilbert, Donald Sumpter and Peter Laird. Jenkins, cast as Tanya Lernov, previously played Nanina in The Savages (1966). She briefly reprised her role as Lernov in the final episode of The War Games (1969). Michael Goldie previously played Craddock in The Dalek Invasion of Earth (1964). Watson also played Craddock in Daleks' Invasion Earth 2150 A.D. (1966), the film adaptation of that serial. Sumpter later played Commander Ridgeway in The Sea Devils (1972) and Rassilon in "Hell Bent" (2015). He also played Erasmus Darkening in The Eternity Trap (2009), a serial from the Doctor Who spin-off The Sarah Jane Adventures.

=== Production ===
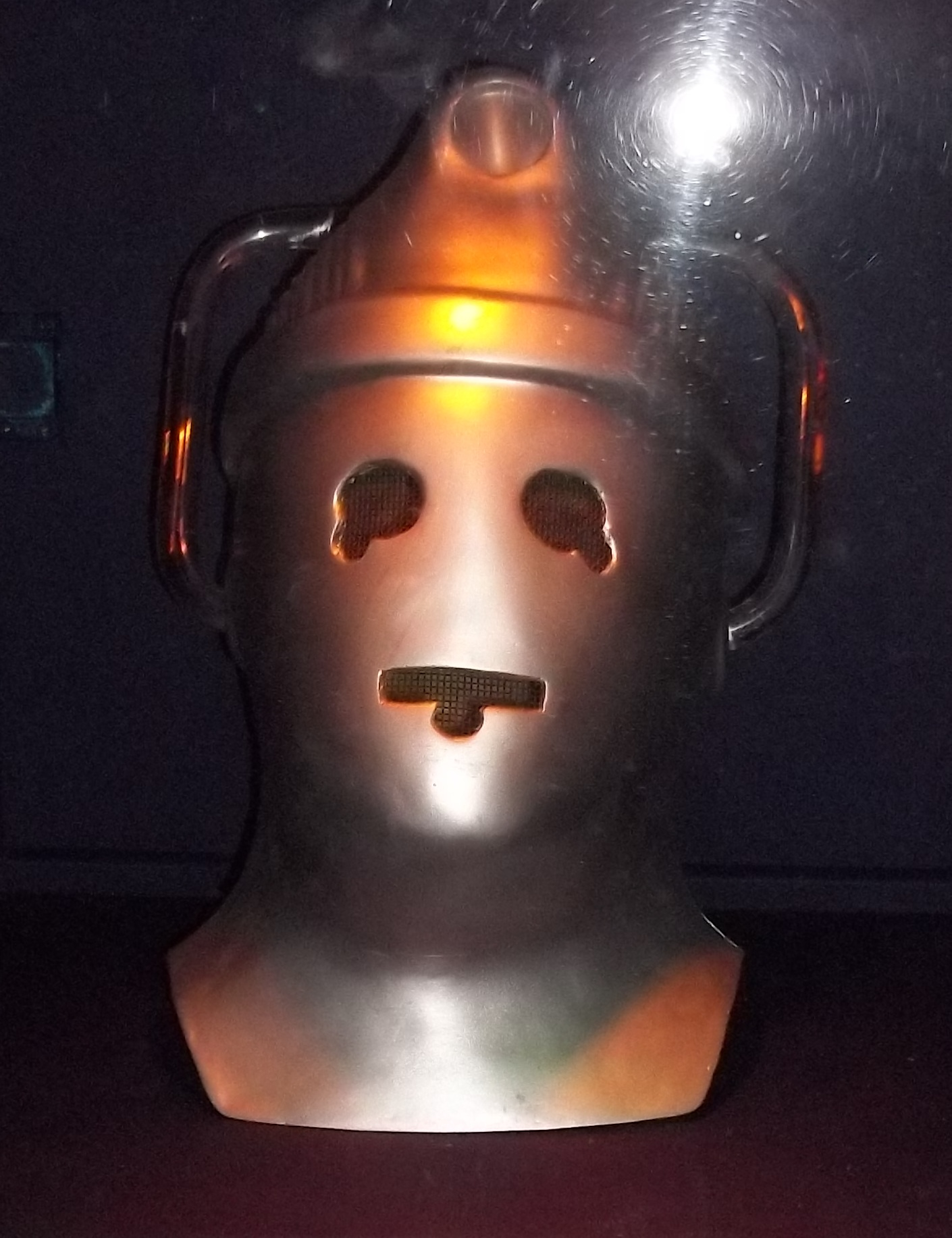
A Cyberman helmet from The Wheel in Space on display in Cardiff. New Cyberman costumes were constructed for the serial.

Two new Cybermen costumes were constructed for the serial. The space suit costumes worn by Hines and Padbury were previously used in The Tenth Planet. It has been suggested that these are the same space suit costumes which were later used in the first two Star Wars films, where one was notably worn by Bossk the bounty hunter.

Production of The Wheel in Space was affected by a BBC strike which "necessitated several last minute changes of studio". Due to cost-saving measures, this was the first Doctor Who serial scored by the BBC Radiophonic Workshop. The BBC visual effects team declined work on the serial due to the heavy demands of the script. As a result, the effects work was subcontracted to the firm Trading Post.

Filming began in March 1968 with the effects sequences in Ealing Film Studios. Recording concluded on 10 May at Riverside Studios, Studio 1. Episodes 1–4 were transmitted from 625-line videotapes. Episodes 5–6 were edited and broadcast from 35 mm film, so that Padbury, Hines and James Mellor did not have to change in and out of their space suit costumes live.

=== Missing episodes ===
Only Episodes 3 and 6 exist in full in the BBC Archives, though off-air audio recordings of all six episodes exist. 16 mm telerecording film copies of the serial were sold to broadcasters in Australia, Hong Kong, Singapore, New Zealand, Gibraltar and Nigeria. The 625-line videotapes of Episodes 1–4 and the 35 mm films for Episodes 5–6 were cleared for junking by the BBC on 21 July 1969. All episodes existed in some form in BBC archives until at least early 1972; by the end of the junking period in 1978, only Episode 6 was retained in the BBC Film Library. In 1983, film collector David Stead bought a 16 mm film copy of Episode 3 from another collector in Southampton. Stead returned the film to the BBC archives in May 1984.

Small clips exist of the remaining 4 episodes. An establishing shot of the Wheel from Episode 1 was later reused in Episode 10 of The War Games. In 1996 two short clips of Duggan's death from Episode 4 were located in Australia, having been excised by ABC censors in 1969. In 2002, three short clips from Episode 5 (totalling eight seconds) were found in a private collection in New Zealand, having been removed by censors.

The first rerun of a complete Doctor Who serial (The Evil of the Daleks; 1967) aired after The Wheel in Space's first broadcast. To prime audiences, Episode 6 ends with the Doctor displaying a scene from this serial on the TARDIS scanner. Within this scene is a short three-frame clip from the missing first episode of The Evil of the Daleks.

== Broadcast and reception ==
Episode	Title	Run time	Original release date	UK viewers (millions)	Appreciation Index
1	"Episode 1"^{†}	23:47	27 April 1968	7.2	57
2	"Episode 2"^{†}	22:50	4 May 1968	6.9	60
3	"Episode 3"	24:25	11 May 1968	7.5	55
4	"Episode 4"^{†}	24:14	18 May 1968	8.6	56
5	"Episode 5"^{†}	21:55	25 May 1968	6.8	57
6	"Episode 6"	23:10	1 June 1968	6.5	62

^† Episode is missing

The Wheel in Space received a mixed reception. A BBC Audience Report on 9 July noted that the programme was becoming repetitive and needed new enemies beyond the Daleks and Cybermen. On 7 June, a young viewer commented to Junior Points of View that "Daleks, Cybermen and Yeti — that's all we get on Dr Who now... They are back repeating what they did before". Troughton was unhappy with the scripts for The Wheel in Space, commenting that the programme had become tired and predictable.

In The Discontinuity Guide (1995), Paul Cornell, Martin Day and Keith Topping described the serial as derivative of other base-under-siege stories. They criticised the story's lack of scientific accuracy despite the detailed portrayal of the Wheel, and stated that "the Cybermen are so bland and ordinary they could have been any other monster". In The Television Companion (1998), David J. Howe and Stephen James Walker felt that some moments, like the death of Corwyn, were tense and strengthened by the guest cast. They stated that Zoe's debut was promising, but criticised the Cybermen's logical yet convoluted plan. In 2009, Patrick Mulkern of Radio Times praised the introduction of Zoe, her dynamic with Jamie, and the supporting character of Corwyn. However, he felt the story had a "clunkingly tortuous plot", which was too complicated and ended "somewhat flatly". In 2018, Mark Wright described The Wheel in Space as a "coda" to base-under-siege stories, noting that subsequent stories in season 6 were more experimental.

== Commercial releases ==
=== In print ===
The Wheel in Space
- Author: Terrance Dicks
- Cover artist: Ian Burgess
- Series: Doctor Who book: Target novelisations
- Release number: 130
- Publisher: W. H. Allen & Co. (hardback); Target Books (paperback)
- Publication date: 17 March 1988 (hardback); 18 August 1988 (paperback)
- ISBN: 0-426-20321-6

A novelisation of this serial, written by Terrance Dicks, was published in hardback by W. H. Allen & Co. in March 1988, and in paperback by Target Books in August. It is incorrectly believed that the paperback edition is rare due to both a low print run and a warehouse fire, but the print run of 23,000 copies was typical of the range and the story of the fire is equally unfounded. BBC Books reprinted the novelisation in August 2021 as part of The Essential Terrance Dicks Volume 1, a collection of Dicks' best novelisations as chosen by fans. An unabridged audiobook was released in 2021, read by David Troughton (Patrick's son) and with Cybermen voices performed by Nicholas Briggs.

=== Home media ===
In July 1992, Episodes 3 and 6 were released on VHS as part of the Cybermen: The Early Years collection. They were later released on the Lost in Time DVD set in November 2004; the censor clips from Episodes 4 and 5 were also included. In May 2004, the audio tracks of all six episodes were released on CD with narration by Wendy Padbury. It was released on vinyl on 16 February 2026.

A new reconstruction of The Wheel in Space, using existing clips and tele-snaps, was previewed at the Classic Doctor Who panel at San Diego Comic-Con 2017. The reconstruction was released exclusively on Britbox in October 2017.

An animated reconstruction of Episode 1, synced with an abridged edit of the surviving audio, premiered at the BFI's Missing Believed Wiped event in December 2018. It was included as a special feature on the home media release of the animated reconstruction of The Macra Terror in March 2019.
