= The Dominators =

044 – The Dominators
- Doctor Who serial

Cast
- Doctor: Patrick Troughton – Second Doctor
- Companions: Frazer Hines – Jamie McCrimmon; Wendy Padbury – Zoe Heriot
- Others: Ronald Allen – Rago; Kenneth Ives – Toba; Arthur Cox – Cully; Felicity Gibson – Kando; Giles Block – Teel; Johnson Bayly – Educator Balan; Walter Fitzgerald – Director Senex; Alan Gerrard – Bovem; Brian Cant – Chairman Tensa; John Cross, Ronald Mansell – Council Members; Malcolm Terris – Etnin; Nicolette Pendrell – Tolata; Philip Voss – Wahed; John Hicks, Gary Smith, Freddie Wilson – Quarks; Sheila Grant – Quark Voices (Note: Also provided the Dulcian Council intercom voice, uncredited.)

Production
- Directed by: Morris Barry
- Written by: "Norman Ashby" (Mervyn Haisman and Henry Lincoln)
- Script editor: Derrick Sherwin
- Produced by: Peter Bryant
- Executive producer: None
- Music by: Special sounds by Brian Hodgson at the BBC Radiophonic Workshop
- Production code: TT
- Series: Season 6
- Running time: 5 episodes, 25 minutes each
- First broadcast: 10 August 1968
- Last broadcast: 7 September 1968

Chronology
← Preceded by The Wheel in Space	Followed by → The Mind Robber

The Dominators is the first serial of the sixth season of the British science fiction television series Doctor Who, which originally aired in five weekly parts from 10 August to 7 September 1968. The Second Doctor (Patrick Troughton) and his travelling companions Jamie McCrimmon (Frazer Hines) and Zoe Heriot (Wendy Padbury) work with the Dulcians of the planet Dulkis to prevent the alien Dominators from blowing up Dulkis and using its irradiated remains as spaceship fuel.

== Plot ==
An alien craft bearing the ruthless Dominators arrives on the peaceful planet of Dulkis. The robotic Quarks are sent out by the Dominators to prepare boreholes into the planet’s crust to convert the planet into rocket fuel.

One of the locals, Cully, along with The Doctor and Jamie, travel to the capital city but has trouble convincing the Council of the Dominators' threat. The Doctor and Jamie take control of a travel pod and return to the Island of Death. Jamie links up with Cully at the museum, while the Doctor is captured by Quarks and taken with the slave force back to the Dominator ship.

The dig proceeds with the Doctor and the other slaves making progress but Jamie and Cully disable another Quark and free their friends. The Doctor has worked out the Dominator scheme, a nuclear fission seed will be dropped down the borehole, converting the planet into a radioactive mass to power the Dominator fleet. They begin digging a tunnel to the central borehole to steal the device before it can detonate. Jamie and Cully help by destroying Quarks with homemade bombs.

The Doctor intercepts the seed during its descent but tells his friends that it cannot be defused. The Doctor runs to the Dominator ship and smuggles the seed on board before the craft lifts off. It departs and the Dominators’ last vision is of the seed device rolling on the floor toward them. The Doctor watches the Dominator ship being destroyed. The Doctor nearly forgets about the volcanic eruption that the dig had set to produce.

== Production ==
Episode 3 had no on-screen episode number caption. This serial was originally composed of six episodes but it was deemed too short of content and reduced to five at the last minute. Producer Peter Bryant ordered Haisman and Lincoln to abandon writing the sixth episode and script editor Derrick Sherwin rewrote the fifth episode to provide a conclusion. Wrotham Quarry in Addington, Kent doubles as the planet surface of Dulkis. Patrick Troughton was absent from all of the location filming sessions. A double plays the role of the Doctor in all the location footage, his face being clearly visible in some shots.

=== Cast notes ===
Ronald Allen later played Ralph Cornish in The Ambassadors of Death (1970). Arthur Cox went on to play Mr Henderson in the 2010 episode "The Eleventh Hour". Brian Cant had previously played Kert Gantry in the story The Daleks' Master Plan (1965–66). Malcolm Terris later appeared in The Horns of Nimon (1979–80). Philip Voss had previously played Acomat in Marco Polo (1964).

== Broadcast and reception ==
Episode	Title	Run time	Original release date	UK viewers (millions)	Archive
1	"Episode 1"	24:25	10 August 1968	6.1	16mm t/r
2	"Episode 2"	24:07	17 August 1968	5.9	16mm t/r
3	[Episode 3] (Note: This episode has no on-screen episode title)	24:06	24 August 1968	5.4	35mm film
4	"Episode 4"	23:54	31 August 1968	7.5	16mm t/r
5	"Episode 5"	24:19	7 September 1968	5.9	16mm t/r

The BBC Audience Research Report for The Dominators showed that much of the sample dismissed the serial as unsurprising as it followed a known pattern, though a third felt that it was still inventive. In his last convention appearance before his death, Troughton agreed with the statement that The Dominators was "one of the dullest" Doctor Who stories. He criticised the Dominators' repetitive dialogue.

In The Discontinuity Guide (1995), Paul Cornell, Martin Day, and Keith Topping wrote that the serial treated the issues of the time—like hippies and unilateralism—with "disdain", and the story was also "very dull". In The Television Companion (1998), David J. Howe and Stephen James Walker called the serial "a disappointingly lacklustre start to the sixth season". They found it hard for the viewer to care about the Dulcians but said the Dominators were "hardly amongst the best of the series' alien creations, [but] at least quite well realised on screen". In 2009, Mark Braxton of Radio Times described the serial as lazy in production with "hopeless" cliffhangers and a lack of audience identification. He wrote that the few small "saving graces" were the appearance of the Quarks and the pyrotechnics. Reviewing the serial for SFX, Ian Berriman gave The Dominators a rating of two out of five stars. He wrote that the plot did not have much and was "push-button and pedestrian", with the best thing being Troughton. DVD Talk's John Sinnott was more positive, giving the story three out of five stars. He criticised the "talky beginning" and non-frightening Quarks but felt that it was a "wonderful romp" due to the TARDIS crew.

=== Archival status ===
When the 16mm film prints of the serial were discovered at BBC Enterprises, Episodes 4 and 5 were discovered to have been slightly edited. These edits originated from Australian broadcaster. In October 1996, Australian fans discovered the censor clips of Episodes 4 and 5 in the records of the National Archives of Australia, along with other Doctor Who clips. The clips from The Dominators, episode 4–5 precisely matched the edits to the prints already held by the BBC, suggesting that the episodes were exactly the same prints that had been censored decades before. The clips were subsequently reintegrated into the prints for the DVD release.

== Commercial releases ==
=== In print ===
The Dominators
- Author: Ian Marter
- Cover artist: Andrew Skilleter
- Series: Doctor Who book: Target novelisations
- Release number: 86
- Publisher: Target Books
- Publication date: 19 July 1984
- ISBN: 0-426-19553-1

A novelisation of this serial, written by Ian Marter, was published by Target Books in April 1984.

=== Home media ===
The Dominators was released on VHS in 1990. It was released on CD on 7 May 2007 and as a DVD in the UK on 12 July 2010 and in the USA and Canada on 11 January 2011.

Commenting on the lack of restoration work applied to earlier Doctor Who VHS projects, future Doctor Who Restoration Team member Steve Thomas describes the 1990 VHS release of The Dominators as "particularly poor", adding: "At one point you saw the dirt coming off the edge of the film, falling through the gate and getting stuck at the right hand side of the gate. And this was on a VHS release. It was so poor that [senior BBC colourist] Jonathan Wood bought it and then just took it back to the shop, saying, 'I'm sorry, this isn't fit for purpose."
