= The Mind Robber =

045 – The Mind Robber
- Doctor Who serial
- The TARDIS explodes, a scene that is considered one of the programme's best cliffhangers.

Cast
- Doctor: Patrick Troughton – Second Doctor
- Companions: Frazer Hines and Hamish Wilson – Jamie McCrimmon; Wendy Padbury – Zoe Heriot
- Others: Emrys Jones – The Master; Bernard Horsfall – Gulliver; Christopher Robbie – Karkus; Sue Pulford – The Medusa; Philip Ryan – Redcoat; Christine Pirie – Princess Rapunzel; John Greenwood – D'Artagnan / Sir Lancelot; David Cannon – Cyrano; Gerry Wain – Blackbeard; Paul Alexander, Ian Hines, Richard Ireson – Soldiers; Barbara Loft, Sylvestra Le Touzel (as Sylvestra Le Tozel), Timothy Horton, Christopher Reynalds, David Reynalds, Martin Langley – Children; John Atterbury, Ralph Carrigan, Bill Wiesener, Terry Wright – Robots

Production
- Directed by: David Maloney
- Written by: Derrick Sherwin (episode 1, uncredited); Peter Ling (episodes 2 - 5)
- Script editor: Derrick Sherwin
- Produced by: Peter Bryant
- Executive producer: None
- Music by: Special sounds by Brian Hodgson at the BBC Radiophonic Workshop
- Production code: UU
- Series: Season 6
- Running time: 5 episodes, approximately 20 minutes each
- First broadcast: 14 September 1968
- Last broadcast: 12 October 1968

Chronology
← Preceded by The Dominators	Followed by → The Invasion

The Mind Robber is the second serial of the sixth season of the British science fiction television series Doctor Who, which was first broadcast in five weekly parts from 14 September to 12 October 1968.

The serial is set outside of time and space in a world where fictional characters and mythological creatures including Medusa, the Minotaur and the Unicorn exist. In the serial, the English fiction writer "the Master" (Note: Unrelated to the Master, a recurring villain.) (played by Emrys Jones), aware of his own advancing age, tries to recruit the Second Doctor (Patrick Troughton) to take over his role as the creative power in this realm.

== Plot ==
After defeating the Dominators and starting off a volcanic eruption, the Doctor, Jamie, and Zoe find themselves and the TARDIS in the path of a lava flow. Upon trying to dematerialise out of the way, the TARDIS experiences a fault in the fluid link. At the insistence of Zoe and Jamie, the Doctor uses an emergency unit that takes the TARDIS into another dimension outside of reality. The TARDIS rematerialises into a spacial void. Both Jamie and Zoe are tempted out into the void by images of their homes being displayed on the TARDIS scanner. After a confrontation with a group of robots, the TARDIS explodes and splinters, separating the Doctor, Jamie, and Zoe.

After experiencing a series of curious encounters, the Doctor manages to find Jamie and Zoe. He soon deduces that they are in a world filled with fictional and mythological characters. A gun transforms Jamie into a life-sized cardboard cutout, albeit with his face missing, with the Doctor having to put his face back together from the various facial features shown on another board. However, the first time he attempts this, he does it incorrectly with Jamie returning to human form but with a completely different face, and remaining like this for a period of time. Travelling through the location, the Doctor encounters several people, such as Lemuel Gulliver, and Captain Karkus, a fictional superhero from Zoe's time. The Doctor and Zoe are threatened by a Unicorn, which is defeated as the Doctor reminds Zoe that it isn't real. After Jamie's true face is restored, the team are once again split up as Jamie travels alone, ending up in Rapunzel's castle, while the Doctor and Zoe face Medusa.

They finally meet a person called "The Master" who seems to be in charge. It turns out that he is in fact an Earth man abducted and brought to the land of fiction in order to provide creative energies for the unseen aliens who are really in charge. Everything that the Doctor has experienced was a series of tests to prepare him for his role as replacement. The aliens' plan is to control everyone on Earth and bring them to the land of fiction, leaving the Earth itself empty for easy colonisation.

The Doctor rescues Jamie and Zoe from the giant book in which they're trapped, and they return to the control room to free "the Master". Jamie and Zoe overload the computer and it explodes, with all 4 leaving just in time. The TARDIS reforms and the Doctor, Jamie, and Zoe are able to escape.

== Production ==
Working titles for this story included Man Power, Another World and The Fact of Fiction. The Mind Robber was originally composed of four episodes, but the preceding serial, The Dominators, was reduced from six to five episodes. This resulted in a sparse first episode being written, as they had to use the limited budget of the replaced episode. This stretching of the story also resulted in the first four episodes only running between 19 and 22 minutes in length, and Episode 5 being the shortest Doctor Who episode ever at slightly over 18 minutes.

During production, actor Frazer Hines contracted chickenpox and was hurriedly replaced by Hamish Wilson for episode 2. This also meant that a scene had to quickly be written to explain Jamie's sudden change in appearance. On both occasions before Jamie gets turned into a cut-out, he shouts, "creag an tuire". Frazer Hines joked on the DVD commentary that this is Scottish Gaelic for "vodka and tonic". It is close to the MacLaren clan's slogan "Creag an tuirc" ("the rock of the boar").

Location filming for The Mind Robber took place in June 1968 at Harrison's Rocks in Sussex and Kenley Aerodrome in Croydon. Other filming took place in the same month in Ealing Studios, while studio recording for episodes one and two also took place in June. Studio recording for episodes three, four, and five took place in July 1968. The white robots that close in on Jamie and Zoe in the void outside the TARDIS had been loaned from a previous use in the British science fiction television series Out of the Unknown.

=== Cast notes ===
Bernard Horsfall later played a Time Lord in The War Games (1969), Taron in Planet of the Daleks (1973) and Chancellor Goth in The Deadly Assassin (1976), all were directed by David Maloney. He also played Arnold Baynes in the audio play Davros. Christopher Robbie appeared in Revenge of the Cybermen (1975), playing the Cyberleader. Ian Hines, who plays one of the soldiers, is the brother of Frazer Hines.

== Broadcast and reception ==
Episode	Title	Run time	Original release date	UK viewers (millions)	Archive
1	"Episode 1"	21:27	14 September 1968	6.6	16mm t/r
2	"Episode 2"	21:39	21 September 1968	6.5	16mm t/r
3	"Episode 3"	19:29	28 September 1968	7.2	16mm t/r
4	"Episode 4"	19:14	5 October 1968	7.3	16mm t/r
5	"Episode 5"	18:00	12 October 1968	6.7	35mm film

Although a caption at the end of Episode 5 advertised The Invasion for the next week, it would be three weeks before it was broadcast due to the BBC's coverage of the 1968 Summer Olympics. The story was repeated on BBC2 on consecutive Fridays from 31 January – 28 February 1992, achieving viewing figures of 2.57, 2.64, 1.5, 1.5 and 3.46 million respectively.

The BBC's Audience Research Report showed a mostly negative reaction from viewers, with "just under a third" reacting favourably. The complaints mainly were around the story being more fantasy-orientated rather than the more dignified science fiction, making it seem "silly". Others liked the concept, but felt it was too complicated for children.

Paul Cornell, Martin Day, and Keith Topping wrote of the serial in The Discontinuity Guide (1995), "The combination of disturbing images (Jamie having his face taken away), superb literalism ('When is a door not a door?') and set pieces (the mental battle for control of Jamie and Zoe) makes this one of the most memorable stories of the era." In The Television Companion (1998), David J. Howe and Stephen James Walker praised the story's inventiveness, stating that it "remains a hugely enjoyable story, and one that stands up to repeated viewing". However, they said that the various characters that did not contribute much made the story "a bit of a jumble", and the fact that the serial was elongated by an episode had added padding. Howe and Walker also felt that the story went "downhill" after the "wonderful" first episode. In 2009, Mark Braxton of Radio Times praised the story's "brave" premise and its "delightful" but subtle humour. He also wrote that the inhabitants of the Land of Fiction were "well cast", despite being "middle-class" and "bookish". The A.V. Club reviewer Christopher Bahn described it as "one of the series' most genre-breaking and forward-thinking stories", with the various elements "creepy and frightening" rather than played for camp. While he noted the confusion of where reality ended and the Land of Fiction began and the ambiguous ending that did not seem to affirm if they had escaped it or not, Bahn felt that it had a "weird effect" of strengthening the theme of the danger being the Doctor's ongoing story. In 2010, Charlie Jane Anders of io9 listed the cliffhanger to the first episode — in which the TARDIS breaks apart — as one of the greatest cliffhangers in the history of Doctor Who.

== Commercial releases ==
=== In print ===
The Mind Robber
- Author: Peter Ling
- Cover artist: David McAllister
- Series: Doctor Who book: Target novelisations
- Release number: 115
- Publisher: Target Books
- Publication date: November 1986 (Hardback) 16 April 1987 (Paperback)
- ISBN: 0-426-20286-4

A novelisation of this serial, written by Peter Ling, was published by Target Books in November 1986.

=== Home media ===
The Mind Robber was released on VHS in May 1990 and released on Region 2 DVD on 7 March 2005, and in North America on 6 September 2005.

=== Tales of the TARDIS ===
A special edition of the episode aired on BBC iPlayer on 1 November 2023, in the spin-off Tales of the TARDIS. The episode opens with the characters Jamie and Zoe in the "Memory TARDIS" and talk about past adventures, the episode is then played in full.

== Critical analysis ==
A book length study of the serial, written by Andrew Hickey, was published as part of The Black Archive series from Obverse Books in 2016.

The serial was covered in volume 13 of the Doctor Who: The Complete History book series, which reprinted Andrew Pixley's 'Archive' features from Doctor Who Magazine and the various Doctor Who Magazine Special Editions, as well as new articles created specifically for the book.
