= The Krotons =

047 – The Krotons
- Doctor Who serial

Cast
- Doctor: Patrick Troughton – Second Doctor
- Companions: Frazer Hines – Jamie McCrimmon; Wendy Padbury – Zoe Heriot
- Others: James Copeland – Selris; James Cairncross – Beta; Gilbert Wynne – Thara; Philip Madoc – Eelek; Terence Brown – Abu; Madeleine Mills – Vana; Richard Ireson – Axus; Maurice Selwyn – Custodian; Bronson Shaw – Student; Roy Skelton, Patrick Tull – Kroton Voices; Robert La'Bassiere, Miles Northover – Krotons

Production
- Directed by: David Maloney
- Written by: Robert Holmes
- Script editor: Terrance Dicks
- Produced by: Peter Bryant
- Executive producer: None
- Music by: Special sounds by Brian Hodgson at the BBC Radiophonic Workshop
- Production code: WW
- Series: Season 6
- Running time: 4 episodes, 25 minutes each
- First broadcast: 28 December 1968
- Last broadcast: 18 January 1969

Chronology
← Preceded by The Invasion	Followed by → The Seeds of Death

The Krotons is the fourth serial of the sixth season of the British science fiction television series Doctor Who, which was first broadcast in four weekly parts from 28 December 1968 to 18 January 1969.

In the serial, the time traveller the Second Doctor (Patrick Troughton) and his travelling companions Jamie McCrimmon (Frazer Hines) and Zoe Heriot (Wendy Padbury) battle alongside the Gond race against the crystalline aliens the Krotons, who enslaved the Gonds in their city for thousands of years.

== Plot ==
On an unnamed planet, a race called the Gonds are subject to the mysterious Krotons, unseen beings to whom they provide their brightest intelligences as "companions." Thara, son of the Gond leader Selris, is the only one to object to this practice; those who have become companions before have never been seen nor heard from again. The Second Doctor, Jamie and Zoe arrived in time to witness the death of Abu, and intervened to save Vana, two chosen companions. They use this information to convince the Gonds of the malign influence of the Krotons on their society.

Thara uses the disquiet of the situation to lead a rebellion and attack the Teaching Machines of the Krotons in the Hall of Learning. This prompts a probe to appear, defend the Machines, and warn the Gonds to cease. Zoe tries the Teaching Machines and is selected to be a companion. The Doctor does the same and both are summoned into the Dynotrope where they are subjected to a mental attack. Zoe deduces that the Krotons have found a way to transfer mental power into pure energy, while the Doctor busies himself with taking chemical samples of the Kroton environment. Circumstances now trigger the creation of two Krotons from chemical vats within the Dynatrope (the Kroton spaceship). The newly created Krotons capture Jamie, but are really seeking the Doctor and Zoe, the "High Brains", who have now left the Dynatrope.

Eelek and Axus, two councillors previously loyal to the Krotons, begin to rally for all-out war and depose Selris. Selaris insists it is a better idea to attack the Dynatrope from underneath by destabilising its foundation. Eelek has Selris arrested and reasserts control by negotiating with the Krotons that they will leave the planet if given the two "High Brains." Zoe and the Doctor are forced into the Dynatrope and Selris dies, providing them with a phial of acid which the Doctor adds to the Kroton vats. Outside, Jamie and the scientist Beta launch an attack on the structure of the ship using sulphuric acid. This two-pronged assault destroys the tellurium-based Krotons and their craft. The Dynatrope dissolves away and the Gonds are free at last, choosing Thara to lead them.

Leaving the Gonds to find their own answers for the future, the Doctor, Jamie and Zoe return to the TARDIS.

== Production ==
Working titles for this story included The Trap and The Space Trap. Robert Holmes had originally submitted The Trap to the BBC as a stand-alone science-fiction serial in 1965. Head of Serials Shaun Sutton rejected the serial as being not the kind of thing the BBC was interested in making at the time, but suggested the writer pitch it to the Doctor Who production office as an idea for that series. Holmes did so, and although story editor Donald Tosh was interested, the scripts went no further at the time. Some years later, assistant script editor Terrance Dicks found the story in the production office files when clearing a backlog, and decided to develop it with Holmes as a personal project, in case other scripts fell through. When the latter event occurred (Dick Sharples script Prison in Space, a comedic dystopian tale where females rule with dollybird guards, proved unworkable), Dicks was able to present the serial to his superiors as a ready production. Director David Maloney agreed the serial was viable, and it went before the cameras very quickly as an emergency replacement.

Robert La'Bassiere is actually a pseudonym for Robert Grant, who requested that he be credited under this name for his appearance as one of the Krotons. Scenes set on the planet's surface were filmed at the Tank Quarry and West of England Quarry on the Malvern Hills.

=== Cast notes ===
One of the guest actors for The Krotons is Philip Madoc, who appeared in a different role later in the season in The War Games (1969) as well as in other roles with Tom Baker's Fourth Doctor. The actor James Cairncross, who plays Beta, previously appeared as Lemaitre in The Reign of Terror with William Hartnell's First Doctor.

== Broadcast and reception ==
Episode	Title	Run time	Original release date	UK viewers (millions)	Archive
1	"Episode One"	23:00	28 December 1968	9.0	35mm film
2	"Episode Two"	23:03	4 January 1969	8.4	16mm t/r
3	"Episode Three"	21:47	11 January 1969	7.5	16mm t/r
4	"Episode Four"	22:39	18 January 1969	7.1	16mm t/r

Episode 1 had the highest viewing figures of any Second Doctor story, at 9 million. The serial was repeated on BBC2 in November 1981, daily (Monday–Thursday, 9–12 November 1981) at 5:40 pm as part of "The Five Faces of Doctor Who", a series of repeats to bridge the long gap between seasons 18 and 19. At the time, it was the only four-part Patrick Troughton serial that existed in the BBC Archives. The viewing figures for the repeats were 4.4, 4.6, 4.6 and 4.5 million viewers respectively.

According to the BBC's Audience Research Report on the first episode the story received a mixed reception from viewers. Some enjoyed the story, describing it as "intriguing" and "compelling". More critical viewers thought the series was becoming "stale" and "boring" and that it was "too horrific" and "too far-fetched". A small minority considered it to be "the usual predictable rubbish", some saying that they only watched the show because their children enjoyed it.

Patrick Mulkern of the Radio Times gave the serial a mixed review, acknowledging that "The episodes are packed with incident, the slate-dark quarry filming is fluid and moody, and there are decent performances." but criticising the Krotons themselves as "some of the silliest monsters ever to shame the series."

The serial was positively received by James Peaty of Den of Geek who noted that whilst the story was a fairly standard one it benefitted from the dramatic intensity and sharp dialogue crafted by writer Robert Holmes. Peaty was also impressed by Philip Madoc's performance as Eelek and the direction by David Maloney. Although he considered the Krotons to be a "workaday adventure" Peaty said that "there are still many things to enjoy within its relatively brisk 90-minute running time."

== Commercial releases ==
=== In print ===
The Krotons
- Author: Terrance Dicks
- Cover artist: Andrew Skilleter
- Series: Doctor Who book: Target novelisations
- Release number: 99
- Publisher: Target Books
- Publication date: 14 November 1985
- ISBN: 0-426-20189-2

A novelisation of this serial, written by Terrance Dicks, was published by Target Books in June 1985.

=== Home media ===
This story was released on VHS in February 1991. The soundtrack was released on CD in November 2008. The Krotons was released on DVD in the UK on 2 July 2012. The Region 1 DVD was released on 10 July 2012.

Episode One of The Krotons exists as both a 16mm telerecording film print and a 35mm negative. Clips taken from a VidFIREd transfer of the high quality 35mm negative can be seen in the restoration documentary on the DVD release of The Aztecs and as part of the 40th Anniversary music video on Doctor Who DVDs released in 2003.

=== Soundtrack release ===
Doctor Who: The Krotons

Soundtrack album by Brian Hodgson and the BBC Radiophonic Workshop
- Released: 13 May 2013
- Genre: Soundtrack
- Label: Silva Screen

BBC Radiophonic Workshop chronology
Doctor Who: The Caves of Androzani (2013)	Doctor Who: The Krotons (2013)	Radiophonic Workshop (2014)

Doctor Who soundtrack chronology
The Caves of Androzani (2013)	The Krotons (2013)	Series 7 (2013)

The "special sounds" from this serial by Brian Hodgson at the BBC Radiophonic Workshop were released on CD, Digital Download on 13 May 2013 with a limited run of 10" vinyl 24 May 2013.

==== Track listing ====
All tracks are written by Brian Hodgson, except where noted.

No.	Title	Length
1.	"Doctor Who (New Opening Theme, 1967)" (Ron Grainer arr. Delia Derbyshire)	0:52
2.	"The Learning Hall"	2:40
3.	"Door Opens"	0:36
4.	"Entry into The Machine"	1:33
5.	"TARDIS (New Landing)"	0:18
6.	"Wasteland Atmosphere"	1:23
7.	"Machine And City Theme"	1:49
8.	"Machine Exterior"	1:43
9.	"Panels Open"	0:17
10.	"Dispersal Unit"	0:40
11.	"Sting"	0:19
12.	"Selris' House"	0:41
13.	"Machine Interior"	1:16
14.	"Snake Bleeps Low"	1:01
15.	"Silver Hose (The Snake)"	0:45
16.	"Snake Bleeps High"	0:30
17.	"Teaching Machine Hums"	0:43
18.	"Forcefield"	0:47
19.	"Burning Light"	1:05
20.	"Birth of a Kroton"	1:10
21.	"Kroton Theme"	2:13
22.	"Kroton Dies"	0:34
23.	"Link - Rising Hum"	2:04
24.	"Kroton Dies (Alternative)"	0:19
Total length:		26:36
