= The Final Sanction (novel) =

1999 novel by Steve Lyons

- Author: Steve Lyons
- Series: Doctor Who book: Past Doctor Adventures
- Release number: 24
- Subject: Featuring: Second Doctor; Zoe and Jamie
- Set in: Period between The Seeds of Death and The Space Pirates
- Publisher: BBC Books
- Publication date: 5 July 1999
- Pages: 284
- ISBN: 0-563-55584-X
- Preceded by: Storm Harvest
- Followed by: City at World's End

The Final Sanction is a BBC Books original novel written by Steve Lyons and based on the long-running British science fiction television series Doctor Who. It features the Second Doctor, Zoe and Jamie. It was the last book in the series to use the "silver" version of the film logo.

== Synopsis ==
It is the second and so far final encounter between the Doctor and the Selachians, first introduced by Lyons in his previous Second Doctor novel, The Murder Game. The year is 2204. The Doctor is caught in human history. When the TARDIS is stolen and Zoe is kidnapped by a Selachian he is forced to intervene in a war. The Doctor must make a painful choice: which is more important the flow of a time stream or the lives of his companions.
