= Zoe Heriot =

Fictional character from Doctor Who

- Doctor Who character
- First appearance: The Wheel in Space (1968)
- Last appearance: Tales of the TARDIS (2023)
- Portrayed by: Wendy Padbury
- Duration: 1968–1969, 1983, 2023

In-universe information
- Species: Human
- Gender: Female
- Occupation: Astrophysicist; Librarian
- Affiliation: Second Doctor
- Spouse: Unnamed Australian
- Children: James
- Home: Earth (Space Station W3)
- Home era: 21st century

Zoe Heriot (sometimes spelled Zoe Herriot) is a fictional character played by Wendy Padbury in the long-running British science fiction television series Doctor Who. A young astrophysicist who lived on a space wheel in the 21st century, she was a companion of the Second Doctor and a regular in the programme from 1968 to 1969. Zoe appeared in eight stories (48 episodes).

== Character history ==
Zoe first appears in the serial The Wheel in Space, where she is the librarian on board Space Station W3; also known as the Wheel. When the Cybermen attack, she aids the Doctor and Jamie in defeating them before stowing away aboard the TARDIS. In David Whitaker's script for The Wheel in Space, Zoe's last name is spelled "Heriot", but the double-"r" misspelling is also seen in reference works.

Zoe's age is not given in the series, but according to initial publicity she was fifteen when she joined the TARDIS crew. She holds a degree in pure mathematics and is a genius, with intelligence scores comparable to the Doctor's. Coupled with her photographic memory and the advanced learning techniques of her era, this makes her somewhat like a human calculator, able to perform complicated mathematics in her head. Part of the reason for her wanting to travel with the Doctor is her chafing at the restrictions and sterile surroundings of her station-bound existence. However, her real-world experience is severely limited, causing her to get herself into trouble frequently.

Together with the Doctor and Jamie, she meets the Cybermen again when they invade 20th-century London, enters the surreal Land of Fiction, fights the Ice Warriors and survives the battlefields of the War Chief's war games. Her journeys with the Doctor come to an end in that serial, when the Time Lords finally catch up with the Doctor. As well as forcing a regeneration on him and exiling him to Earth, the Time Lords return Jamie and Zoe to their own times, wiping their memories of their experiences with the Doctor (save for their first encounters with him) in the process.

An illusory image of Zoe appears to the Second Doctor and the Brigadier in Gallifrey's Death Zone the 20th-anniversary episode, "The Five Doctors".

An older Zoe, still played by Padbury, returns in the 60th-anniversary spin-off Tales of the TARDIS. She and Jamie, drawn from their respective timelines aboard a Memory Tardis, discover their memories of each and the Doctor have been restored. Zoe describes her life after the events of The War Games; she married an Australian man, has a scientist son she named James (named after Jamie thought never realised) and is currently serving her third term as president.

== Other appearances ==
Zoe's life after her return to her own time is not further explored in the series. In the spin-off short story "The Tip of the Mind" by Peter Anghelides, it is revealed that although her intellect allows her to resist the memory blocks by the Time Lords, she is unable to access the memories of her time with the Doctor consciously. This causes her strange dreams, and makes her work suffer. An encounter with the Third Doctor makes the memory blocks permanent, but she ultimately never reaches her full potential.

Padbury has appeared in Doctor Who audio adventures from Big Finish Productions, first as a character other than Zoe in the full-cast audio Davros, and then as Zoe in Fear of the Daleks, part of the "Companion Chronicles" talking book series. The latter story portrays an older Zoe having detailed dreams of her adventures with the Doctor; she suspects that something is blocking her memory, but she does not know what, and is seeing a psychiatric counselor in an effort to understand the "dreams". She has returned as Zoe in several more Big Finish plays such as Echoes of Grey and her second Companion Chronicle, Prison in Space, based on an unmade TV story. Echoes of Grey and subsequent follow-up stories, The Memory Cheats and The Uncertainty Principle depict Zoe being essentially taken prisoner by an unnamed Company whose experiments in creating a new form of life were disrupted by the Doctor, Jamie and Zoe—the TARDIS arriving on Earth a few decades in Zoe's future—in Echoes of Grey, subsequent stories seeing the Company arresting Zoe's older, contemporary self on trumped-up charges to try and provoke Zoe into unlocking her lost memories of her time with the Doctor so that they can harness the secret of time travel. This comes to a head in the audio Second Chances when Zoe has a 'flashback' of the destruction of a space station that will actually take place a few days in the future from her current point in time, allowing Zoe to interact with her past self as she tries to change her history and prevent the station's destruction. Although this part of her plan fails, the audio ends with Zoe using a computer virus that has mutated to attack physical matter to destroy the Company and escape, although her mental state and memories of her time with the Doctor are still lost.

An older Zoe is reunited with the Doctor in his sixth incarnation in Legend of the Cybermen, where she returns to the Land of Fiction after she is nearly converted by the Cybermen after leaving the Doctor, her attempt to trap the Cybermen in the Land resulting in the universe being endangered by the risk that the Cybermen will harness the computer that controls the Land and use that to influence the imagination of the entire universe. After Zoe draws the Doctor into the Land, she created a fictional duplicate of Jamie to protect the Doctor until he learns the full situation and helps Zoe drive the Cybermen out, at the cost of Zoe losing her memories again as the Doctor takes her home. Zoe and Jamie also meet the Sixth Doctor in the audio Last of the Cybermen, but in this case the Sixth Doctor has swapped with the Second shortly before the events of The War Games, the Doctor's attempt to change his personal history to let his companions keep their memories failing when history is 'reset' as the Second Doctor returns to his proper place in history.

The novelisation of the TV serial The Mind Robber mentions, in passing; that Zoe discussed that adventure "long afterwards", suggesting that she eventually recovered some or all of her lost memories.

== List of appearances ==
=== Television ===
Season 5

- The Wheel in Space (episodes 2–6)

Season 6

- The Dominators
- The Mind Robber
- The Invasion (episodes 1–2 & 4–8)
- The Krotons
- The Seeds of Death
- The Space Pirates
- The War Games

20th anniversary special

- "The Five Doctors" (cameo)

2023 specials

- Tales of the TARDIS: The Mind Robber

=== Audio drama ===
- Fear of the Daleks
- The Glorious Revolution (adventure related by Jamie)
- Legend of the Cybermen (with the Sixth Doctor and a fictional duplicate of Jamie)
- Echoes of Grey
- Prison in Space
- Tales from the Vault
- The Memory Cheats
- The Uncertainty Principle
- Second Chances
- The Rosemariners
- The Queen of Time
- Lords of the Red Planet
- Last of the Cybermen (with the Sixth Doctor and Jamie; for Jamie and Zoe, occurs between "The Space Pirates" and "The War Games")

=== Short Trips audios ===
- A Stain of Red in the Sand
- The Five Dimensional Man
- Penny Wise, Pound Foolish

=== Novels ===
Virgin Missing Adventures

- The Menagerie by Martin Day

Past Doctor Adventures

- The Final Sanction by Steve Lyons
- The Colony of Lies by Colin Brake
- The Indestructible Man by Simon Messingham

Telos Doctor Who novellas

- Foreign Devils by Andrew Cartmel

BBC Books

- The Wheel of Ice by Stephen Baxter

=== Short stories ===
- "Fallen Angel" by Andy Lane (Decalog)
- "Vortex of Fear" by Gareth Roberts (Decalog 2: Lost Property)
- "Aliens and Predators" by Colin Brake (Decalog 3: Consequences)
- "War Crimes" by Simon Bucher-Jones (Short Trips)
- "uPVC" by Paul Farnsworth (More Short Trips)
- "Please Shut the Gate" by Stephen Lock (Short Trips and Sidesteps)
- "Constant Companion" by Simon A. Forward (Short Trips: Zodiac)
- "The Tip of the Mind" by Peter Anghelides (Short Trips: Companions)
- "One Small Step" by Nicholas Briggs (Short Trips: Past Tense)
- "Goodwill Towards Men" by J. Shaun Lyon (Short Trips: A Christmas Treasury)
- "That Which Went Away" by Mark Wright (Short Trips: Seven Deadly Sins)
- "Undercurrents" by Gary Merchant (Short Trips: A Day in the Life)
- "Visiting Hours" by Eddie Robson (Short Trips: A Day in the Life)
- "Mercury" by Eddie Robson (Short Trips: The Solar System)
- "Lepidoptery for Beginners" by John Dorney (Short Trips: Defining Patterns)
- "Homework" by Michael Coen (Short Trips: Defining Patterns)
- "Relative Dimensions" by Andrew Cheverton (Shelf Life)

=== Comics ===
- "The Vampire Plants" by David Brian (Doctor Who Annual 1970)
- "The Robot King" by David Brian (Doctor Who Annual 1970)
- "The Tides of Time" (Cameo) by Steve Parkhouse and Dave Gibbons (Doctor Who Magazine)
- "Land of the Blind" by W. Scott Gray and Lee Sullivan (Doctor Who Magazine 224–226)
- "Renewal" by Tony Lee and Pia Guerra (Doctor Who: The Forgotten #2)
