= Bernard Horsfall =

British actor (1930–2013)

- Born: Bernard Arthur Gordon Horsfall; 20 November 1930; Bishop's Stortford, Hertfordshire, England
- Died: 28 January 2013 (aged 82); Isle of Skye, Scotland
- Occupation: Actor
- Years active: 1957–2008
- Spouse: Jane Rogers
- Children: 3

Bernard Arthur Gordon Horsfall (20 November 1930 – 28 January 2013) was an English actor of stage and screen.

== Early life ==
Horsfall was born in Bishop's Stortford, Hertfordshire, and educated at Rugby School. He trained as an actor at the Webber Douglas Academy of Dramatic Art.

== Career ==
Horsfall appeared in many television and film roles, including the title role in Campion (1959–1960), Pathfinders to Mars (1960), the second sequel to Target Luna, Guns at Batasi (1964), The Avengers (three episodes in 1966 and 1967), Department S (1968), On Her Majesty's Secret Service (1969), Beasts, as Sir Christopher Hatton in the 1971 BBC miniseries Elizabeth R, Enemy at the Door (ITV, 1978–1980), Gandhi (1982), an episode of The Jewel in the Crown (ITV, 1984), Dr. Bradbury in an episode of Strangers and Brothers (BBC, 1984), the character Frankland in The Hound of the Baskervilles (ITV, 1988), and the character Balliol in Braveheart (1995). His other roles included portraying British barrister Melford Stevenson in Lady Killers, a 1980 Granada Television dramatisation of the 1955 case of Ruth Ellis.

Horsfall made several guest appearances in the BBC science fiction television series Doctor Who. His first was as Lemuel Gulliver in The Mind Robber (1968). His other appearances were as a Time Lord in The War Games (1969), Taron in Planet of the Daleks (1973), and Chancellor Goth in The Deadly Assassin (1976). All four of these serials were directed by David Maloney. Many years later he returned to Doctor Who, appearing in Davros – a Doctor Who audio drama produced by Big Finish Productions.

Horsfall also appeared, with a Swedish accent, as Christianson in an episode of The Persuaders! entitled "The Morning After" during 1972.

Horsfall's stage work included performances at The Old Vic, with the Royal Shakespeare Company and at the National Theatre.

== Death ==
Horsfall died on 28 January 2013, aged 82, on the Isle of Skye in Scotland. He was survived by his wife Jane, their daughters Hannah and Rebecca, five grandchildren and his sister. His son Christian died in 2012.

== Selected filmography ==
- The Steel Bayonet (1957) – Pvt. Livingstone
- The Admirable Crichton (1957) – Lifeboatman (uncredited)
- High Flight (1957) – Radar Operator
- The One That Got Away (1957) – Lieutenant – Kent (uncredited)
- The Angry Silence (1960) – Pryce-Evans
- Man in the Moon (1960) – Rex
- Guns at Batasi (1964) – Sgt. 'Schoolie' Prideaux
- Doctor Who: The Mind Robber (1968) – Lemuel Gulliver
- Department S (1968) – Captain Carter
- On Her Majesty's Secret Service (1969) – Shaun Campbell
- Doctor Who: The War Games (1969) – a Time Lord
- Quest for Love (1971) – Telford
- Doctor Who: Planet of the Daleks (1973) – Taron
- Gold (1974) – Dave Kowalski
- Shout at the Devil (1976) – Captain Joyce
- Doctor Who: The Deadly Assassin (1976) – Chancellor Goth
- Enemy at the Door (1978) – Dr. Philip Martel
- Brass Target (1978) – Shelley
- Lady Killers (1980) – Melford Stevenson
- Inside the Third Reich (1982) – Fritz Todt
- Gandhi (1982) – Gen. Edgar
- Braveheart (1995) – Balliol
- Stone of Destiny (2008) – Archdeacon (final film role)
