= The Seeds of Death =

048 – The Seeds of Death
- Doctor Who serial
- DVD cover for the Special Edition of The Seeds of Death

Cast
- Doctor: Patrick Troughton – Second Doctor
- Companions: Frazer Hines – Jamie McCrimmon; Wendy Padbury – Zoe Heriot
- Others: Ronald Leigh-Hunt – Commander Radnor; Louise Pajo – Gia Kelly; Philip Ray – Professor Eldred; Terry Scully – Fewsham; Ric Felgate – Brent; Harry Towb – Osgood; Christopher Coll – Phipps; Martin Cort – Locke; Hugh Morton – Sir James Gregson; Derrick Slater – Security Guard; John Witty – Computer Voice; Alan Bennion – Slaar; Graham Leaman – Grand Marshall; Steve Peters, Tony Harwood, Sonny Caldinez – Ice Warriors

Production
- Directed by: Michael Ferguson
- Written by: Brian Hayles; Terrance Dicks (episodes 3–6, uncredited)
- Script editor: Terrance Dicks
- Produced by: Peter Bryant
- Executive producer: None
- Music by: Dudley Simpson
- Production code: XX
- Series: Season 6
- Running time: 6 episodes, 25 minutes each
- First broadcast: 25 January 1969
- Last broadcast: 1 March 1969

Chronology
← Preceded by The Krotons	Followed by → The Space Pirates

The Seeds of Death is the fifth serial of the sixth season of the British science fiction television series Doctor Who. Written by Brian Hayles and an uncredited Terrance Dicks and directed by Michael Ferguson, it originally aired in six weekly parts on BBC1 from 25 January to 1 March 1969. It sees the return of the Ice Warriors, previously introduced by Hayles in the 1967 serial The Ice Warriors.

The serial is set in London and on the Moon in the late 21st century. In the serial, the time traveller the Second Doctor (Patrick Troughton) and his travelling companions Jamie McCrimmon (Frazer Hines) and Zoe Heriot (Wendy Padbury), along with the technicians Gia Kelly (Louise Pajo) and Phipps (Christopher Coll), try to prevent the Ice Warriors' plot to make the Earth's atmosphere inhospitable to humans but viable for the Ice Warriors to invade.

== Plot ==
At the end of the twenty-first century, a teleportation technology called "Trans-Mat" (T-Mat) has replaced all traditional forms of transport, allowing people and objects to travel instantly anywhere on Earth. Crewed space exploration has ceased. The Doctor, Jamie McCrimmon and Zoe Heriot arrive in a museum on Earth run by Professor Daniel Eldred dedicated to the obsolete technology of rockets. However, something goes amiss at the T-Mat vital relay station on the Moon and the system breaks down. With communications out, and no way to reach the Moon without T-Mat, those responsible for the system, Commander Radnor and his assistant Gia Kelly, turn to Professor Eldred to help. He has been privately building a rocket in hopes of re-igniting interest in space travel. The Doctor and his companions volunteer to crew the rocket, as the TARDIS is not suitable for short range use.

The relay station on the Moon has been invaded by Ice Warriors, a militant Martian race, who plan to use it as a staging point for an invasion of Earth. The technicians attempt to fight the invaders but several are killed, while Phipps goes into hiding and Fewsham is pressed into assisting the invaders. Fewsham repairs the T-Mat link on receive mode and Kelly beams through to start repairing the T-Mat system.

When the Doctor and his companions arrive on the Moon they make contact with Phipps, who is hiding in the moonbase. The Doctor accidentally reveals himself to the Ice Warriors and their leader Commander Slaar. The Ice Warriors have a deadly plan: they have seeds, which they send to various parts of Earth using T-mat, of a fungus that will multiply and suck all the oxygen from the surrounding atmosphere, xenoforming the planet to be more comfortable for the Martians but uninhabitable for humans. Once the full T-Mat relay is repaired, one seed is sent to Earth Control and explodes, killing a technician and alerting Radnor and Eldred of the danger. The seed soon creates foam, which multiplies its effects and imperils more and more people. Other T-Mat terminals across the world receive more seeds. The Ice Warriors also use T-Mat to dispatch a small advance force to seize Earth's weather control systems in London and ensure good conditions for the growth of the fungus.

On the Moon, Kelly and Phipps work with Zoe and Jamie to stage diversions and attacks against the Ice Warriors. During their main assault to free the Doctor, Phipps is killed. The Ice Warriors have now retreated to their spacecraft to plan the next stage of their invasion, leaving an opportunity for most of the captives to flee. Fewsham, however, remains behind, seemingly fearing an enquiry into his actions if he returns to Earth.

In T-Mat control on Earth, the Doctor works out that the seed pods can be defeated using water. The Doctor tracks Ice Warrior beamed to Earth down to the weather control system, where the alien has been stationed to prevent any rain fall that would be deadly to the pods. The Doctor and his allies recapture the weather control system and summon rain, destroying the fungus.

Fewsham dupes Slaar into revealing in a live link with Earth that the main invasion force is following a homing signal to the Moon, for which he is killed. But at least the Doctor now knows the full extent of the Ice Warrior plans. He returns to the moonbase by T-mat to set a new signal for the Martian fleet from there. The Doctor confronts Slaar while substituting the alternative signal. This draws the Martian fleet away and lures it into the Sun. Slaar moves to kill the Doctor in revenge but the arrival of Jamie in a T-Mat cubicle causes chaos, and Slaar is killed in one of the sonic beams of the last of his warriors. Jamie then kills the surviving Martian and the invasion is over. The Doctor and Jamie return to Earth and then make their goodbyes before departing in the TARDIS with Zoe.

== Production ==
Episode	Title	Run time	Original release date	UK viewers (millions)	Archive
1	"Episode One"	23:11	25 January 1969	6.6	16mm t/r
2	"Episode Two"	24:26	1 February 1969	6.8	16mm t/r
3	"Episode Three"	24:10	8 February 1969	7.5	16mm t/r
4	"Episode Four"	24:57	15 February 1969	7.1	16mm t/r
5	"Episode Five"	24:56	22 February 1969	7.6	35mm film
6	"Episode Six"	24:31	1 March 1969	7.7	16mm t/r

Although Brian Hayles is solely credited as the story's author, series script editor Terrance Dicks rewrote Episodes 3 to 6 of the script. This was partly because he considered Hayles's original ending lacklustre and unworkable, but also because originally Jamie McCrimmon was to have been replaced by a new companion called Nik by this story; actor Frazer Hines postponed his departure, however. Dicks was co-credited on the sleeve of the VHS release for his writing duties on the serial.

Patrick Troughton does not appear in Episode 4 as he was on holiday when it was being recorded. A double stands in for him in some shots where the Doctor is seen unconscious on the floor.

=== Cast notes ===
This story is the first story to feature Alan Bennion in the role of an Ice Lord, this one named Slaar. Bennion would return as the Ice Lords Izlyr in The Curse of Peladon (1972) and Azaxyr in The Monster of Peladon (1974). Sonny Caldinez, who played Slaar's second in command, is the only actor to appear as an Ice Warrior in all four televised Doctor Who stories in the classic series to feature the Ice Warriors. Caldinez also appeared as Kemel in The Evil of the Daleks (1967). Ronald Leigh-Hunt played Commander Radnor in this story. Leigh-Hunt would play Commander Stevenson in Revenge of the Cybermen (1975). Harry Towb later played McDermott in Terror of the Autons (1971). Christopher Coll would later play Stubbs in The Mutants (1972). Steve Peters, who played an Ice Warrior, was billed simply as "Alien" in the Radio Times listing for episode one, so as not to spoil the surprise of the Ice Warriors' appearance.

== Commercial releases ==
=== In print ===
The Seeds of Death
- Author: Terrance Dicks
- Cover artist: Tony Masero
- Series: Doctor Who book: Target novelisations
- Release number: 112
- Publisher: Target Books
- Publication date: July 1986 (Hardback) 4 December 1986 (Paperback)
- ISBN: 0-426-20252-X

A novelisation of this serial, written by Dicks, was published by Target Books in July 1986.

=== Home media ===
This story was released on VHS and Betamax in 1985 in an omnibus format. In February 2003, an unedited remastered, VidFIREd version was released on Region 1 and Region 2 DVD. The story was chosen to represent the Patrick Troughton era as part of the Doctor Who 40th Anniversary releases. A special edition Region 1 and 2 DVD with expanded special features and improved picture quality was released along with similarly expanded special editions of the Carnival of Monsters and Resurrection of the Daleks as part of the Revisitations 2 DVD boxed set on 28 March 2011 exclusively in the UK.
