= Jamie McCrimmon =

Fictional character from Doctor Who

- Doctor Who character
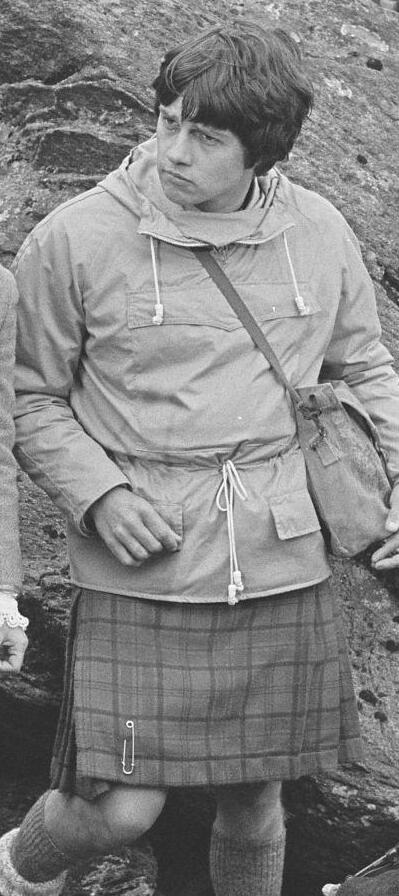
- Frazer Hines as Jamie McCrimmon as seen during filming The Abominable Snowmen (1967)
- First appearance: The Highlanders (1966)
- Last appearance: Tales of the TARDIS (2023)
- Portrayed by: Frazer Hines; Hamish Wilson (The Mind Robber episodes 2–3)
- Duration: 1966–1969, 1983, 1985, 2023

In-universe information
- Full name: James Robert McCrimmon
- Nickname: Jamie
- Species: Human
- Gender: Male
- Occupation: Bagpiper
- Affiliation: Second Doctor; Sixth Doctor
- Family: Donald McCrimmon (father)
- Children: 5 daughters
- Relatives: 19 grandchildren
- Origin: Culloden, Highlands, Scotland
- Home: Earth
- Home era: 1746

James Robert "Jamie" McCrimmon is a fictional character played by Frazer Hines in the long-running British science fiction television series Doctor Who. A piper of the Clan McLaren who lived in 18th-century Scotland, he was a companion of the Second Doctor and a regular in the programme from 1966 to 1969. The spelling of his surname varies from one script to another; it is alternately rendered as Macrimmon and McCrimmond. Jamie appeared in 20 stories (112 episodes).

== Character history ==
The son of Donald McCrimmon — a piper, like his father and his father's father — James Robert McCrimmon first appears in The Highlanders, encountering the Doctor, Ben and Polly in the aftermath of the Battle of Culloden in 1746. At the end of the story, Polly suggests that the Doctor take Jamie along with them. Jamie continues to travel with the Doctor even after Ben and Polly leave the TARDIS at the end of The Faceless Ones. He appears in all but the first Second Doctor serial, The Power of the Daleks, and in more episodes than any other companion, although Tegan Jovanka served with the Doctor for the longest continuous period in terms of years on the series.

Jamie shares a lively, bantering relationship with the Doctor and, during his time in the TARDIS, sees the arrival and departure of first Victoria Waterfield and finally Zoe Heriot. Jamie, being a product of his time, is always solicitous and gentlemanly towards his female companions. While not having the background to always understand the situations his adventures with the Doctor take him into, Jamie is quick enough to translate high technology and concepts into equivalents he can comprehend and deal with. His relationship with the Doctor is not always smooth, and in The Evil of the Daleks he comes close to leaving the Doctor, whom he feels has been manipulating him and Victoria to discover the human factor for the Daleks, without considering the consequences. His battle cry Creag an tuire, in Scottish Gaelic, translates to "The Boar's Rock". It is similar to Creag an tuirc, the motto of the MacLaren Clan of Scotland. Also during Jamie's time with the doctor, he gives him the iconic name John Smith (The Wheel in Space).

Together with the Doctor, Jamie encounters Cybermen, Daleks, the Yeti in the London Underground, the Ice Warriors, and various other dangers. Jamie is particularly fond and protective of Victoria, due in part to her being an elegant Victorian lady. For example, in The Ice Warriors, Jamie's first priority is to rescue Victoria despite being injured to the point where he can't walk. Jamie is heartbroken when Victoria decides to stay with the Harris family at the end of Fury from the Deep, to the point of even being briefly angry with the Doctor for allowing her to leave (The Wheel in Space). Jamie initially finds Zoe's more modern attitudes and bossy nature irritating, but eventually adopts the same protective attitude disguised by the same bantering he engages in with the Doctor. Oftentimes, Jamie's simple common sense beats Zoe's strict logic, such as in The Dominators where Jamie realises that the erupting volcano is going to threaten the TARDIS, while the Doctor and Zoe are still congratulating themselves on defeating their enemies.

Hamish Wilson as Jamie (from The Mind Robber)

During filming of The Mind Robber, Frazer Hines contracted chickenpox and was replaced for part of the serial by Hamish Wilson. This was written in as part of the story when Jamie is turned into a cardboard cut-out and has his face removed by the Master of the Land of Fiction. The Doctor's first attempt to reconstruct his face is unsuccessful. Eventually, Jamie's real face is restored when Hines recovered.

Jamie's interdimensionary travels come to an end on the battlefields of The War Games, when the Time Lords place the Doctor on trial for interfering with the universe. For his offences, the Doctor is forced to regenerate and exiled to Earth. Jamie and Zoe are returned to their own times, their memories of the Doctor wiped, save for their first encounters. When last seen, Jamie is fighting an English redcoat back on the fields of Scotland.

Hines returned as an illusory image of Jamie in the 20th anniversary special "The Five Doctors". He also reprised the role in the 1985 serial The Two Doctors alongside Troughton and Colin Baker as the Second and Sixth Doctors, respectively.

An older Jamie, still portrayed by Hines, returns in the 60th anniversary spin-off Tales of the TARDIS alongside Wendy Padbury as Zoe. Summoned into a Memory Tardis from their respective timelines Jamie and Zoe realise their memories of the Doctor have been restored. Jamie describes his life after returning to 18th century Scotland; he has five daughters and nineteen grandchildren.

== Other mentions ==
He is mentioned by the Fifth Doctor in Castrovalva when he calls Adric Jamie, by the Sixth Doctor in The Two Doctors and Attack of the Cybermen, and by the Seventh Doctor in The Curse of Fenric. A vision of Jamie is seen along with every other companion aside from Leela (who was omitted by mistake in post-production) on the scanner screen in Resurrection of the Daleks.

In Tooth and Claw, the Tenth Doctor uses the alias Doctor James McCrimmon together with a Scottish accent (in reality David Tennant's own).

Throughout Doctor Who, The Doctor repeatedly uses the alias John Smith, originally given to him by Jamie McCrimmon.

== Other appearances ==
Jamie's ultimate fate remains unclear within the generally accepted canonicity of the various Doctor Who spin-off media.

In the comic strip story "The World Shapers" with the Sixth Doctor, published in Doctor Who Magazine #127–#129, an elderly Jamie remembers his time with the Doctor, explaining that the Doctor had taught him tricks to ensure the Time Lords would not really wipe his memories. In this story, written by Grant Morrison, Jamie sacrifices himself to stop the titular world shaper machine which was evolving aliens into Cybermen.

In the Virgin New Adventures novel Timewyrm: Revelation, writer Paul Cornell omitted Jamie from the group of deceased companions encountered by the Seventh Doctor. In "Planet of the Dead" (DWM #141-#142), a race of shapeshifters known as the Ganzalum impersonate the Doctor's dead companions, including Jamie.

Big Finish Productions have reunited Jamie with the Sixth Doctor in a series of audio plays starting with City of Spires, where he appears to have become a rebel leader known as 'the Black Donald'. However, in the final story, Legend of the Cybermen, it is revealed that this Jamie is simply a fictional construct within the realm seen in The Mind Robber, created by an older Zoe, based on her memories of the real Jamie, to protect the Doctor until he could come to her aid, making him older and creating his 'Black Donald' identity to give him a heroic backstory in the Doctor's absence. Jamie and Zoe also meet the Sixth Doctor in the later audio play Last of the Cybermen, when an unknown enemy causes the Sixth Doctor to swap places with the Second just after the Second Doctor discovers a Cybermen base and a plan to change the history of the Cyber-Wars to avert their final defeat. The Sixth Doctor and Jamie attempt to change history so that Jamie and Zoe can escape the Time Lords and retain their memories before the Sixth Doctor returns to his time and his companions lose all memory of these events. The Companion Chronicles audio story "The Glorious Revolution" sees a Time Lord agent briefly restore the memory of an older Jamie to help resolve an incident where he nearly changed history while travelling with the Doctor. The Time Lord sends energy to Jamie's past self to keep him stabilized until the Doctor can avert the consequences of Jamie's actions, but in the end Jamie chooses to have his memory of the Doctor erased once again, reasoning that it would just make him sad to remember what he had with the Doctor despite his good life now.

The Doctor Who Adventures comic strip gives the Tenth Doctor a companion from 21st century Scotland named Heather McCrimmon, who is a descendant of Jamie.

== Influence ==
The character of Jamie McCrimmon inspired author Diana Gabaldon to set her Outlander series in Jacobite Scotland, and to name its protagonist "Jamie".

This character wore a kilt, which I thought rather fetching, and demonstrated—in this particular episode—a form of pigheaded male gallantry that I've always found endearing: the strong urge on the part of a man to protect a woman, even though he may realize that she's plainly capable of looking after herself.

The story Gabaldon was watching was The War Games. (Gabaldon's character's surname is "Fraser"; however, Gabaldon has stated that she did not derive this name from Frazer Hines, since the PBS station on which she viewed Doctor Who habitually cut off the credits, and so she did not learn Frazer Hines's name until some years later.)

== List of appearances ==
=== Television ===
Season 4

- The Highlanders
- The Underwater Menace
- The Moonbase
- The Macra Terror
- The Faceless Ones
- The Evil of the Daleks

Season 5

- The Tomb of the Cybermen
- The Abominable Snowmen
- The Ice Warriors
- The Enemy of the World (episodes 1-3, 5 and 6)
- The Web of Fear
- Fury from the Deep
- The Wheel in Space

Season 6

- The Dominators
- The Mind Robber
- The Invasion
- The Krotons
- The Seeds of Death
- The Space Pirates
- The War Games

20th anniversary special

- "The Five Doctors" (cameo)

Season 22

- The Two Doctors

=== Audio drama ===
- Fear of the Daleks (adventure related by Zoe)
- Helicon Prime
- The Great Space Elevator (adventure related by Victoria)
- Resistance (adventure related by Polly)
- The Three Companions (adventure related by Polly)
- The Glorious Revolution
- The Emperor of Eternity
- Echoes of Grey (adventure related by Zoe)
- Prison in Space
- The Forbidden Time
- Tales from the Vault (short adventure related by Zoe)
- The Memory Cheats (adventure related by Zoe)
- The Selachian Gambit
- The Jigsaw War
- The Uncertainty Principle (adventure related by Zoe)
- The Rosemariners
- The Queen of Time
- Lords of the Red Planet
- The House of Cards
- The Mouthless Dead
- The Story of Extinction
- The Integral
- The Edge

==== Sixth Doctor audio dramas ====
- City of Spires
- Night's Black Agents
- Wreck of the Titan
- Legend of the Cybermen

==== Short Trips audios ====
- Seven to One
- The Five Dimensional Man
- Penny Wise, Pound Foolish
- Deleted Scenes
- The Last Day at Work

=== Novels ===
Virgin Missing Adventures

- The Menagerie by Martin Day
- Twilight of the Gods by Christopher Bulis
- The Dark Path by David A. McIntee

Past Doctor Adventures

- The Roundheads by Mark Gatiss
- Dreams of Empire by Justin Richards
- The Final Sanction by Steve Lyons
- Heart of TARDIS by Dave Stone
- Independence Day by Peter Darvill-Evans (brief appearance only)
- Combat Rock by Mick Lewis
- The Colony of Lies by Colin Brake
- The Indestructible Man by Simon Messingham

Telos Doctor Who novellas

- Foreign Devils by Andrew Cartmel

BBC Books

- The Wheel of Ice by Stephen Baxter

=== Short stories ===
- "Fallen Angel" by Andy Lane (Decalog)
- "Vortex of Fear" by Gareth Roberts (Decalog 2: Lost Property)
- "Aliens and Predators" by Colin Brake (Decalog 3: Consequences)
- "War Crimes" by Simon Bucher-Jones (Short Trips)
- "uPVC" by Paul Farnsworth (More Short Trips)
- "Please Shut the Gate" by Stephen Lock (Short Trips and Sidesteps)
- "Twin Piques" by Tony Keetch (Short Trips: Zodiac)
- "Constant Companion" by Simon A. Forward (Short Trips: Zodiac)
- "Face-Painter" by Tara Samms (Short Trips: A Universe of Terrors)
- "The Astronomer's Apprentice" by Simon A. Forward (Short Trips: The Muses)
- "One Small Step" by Nicholas Briggs (Short Trips: Past Tense)
- "That Time I Nearly Destroyed The World Whilst Looking For a Dress" by Joseph Lidster (Short Trips: Past Tense)
- "The Age of Ambition" by Andrew Campbell (Short Trips: Life Science)
- "The Farmer's Story" by Todd Green (Short Trips: Repercussions)
- "Screamager" by Jacqueline Rayner (Short Trips: Monsters)
- "The Last Emperor" by Jacqueline Rayner (Short Trips: 2040)
- "Goodwill Towards Men" by J. Shaun Lyon (Short Trips: A Christmas Treasury)
- "That Which Went Away" by Mark Wright (Short Trips: Seven Deadly Sins)
- "Undercurrents" by Gary Merchant (Short Trips: A Day in the Life)
- "Visiting Hours" by Eddie Robson (Short Trips: A Day in the Life)
- "Mercury" by Eddie Robson (Short Trips: The Solar System)
- "All of Beyond" by Helen Raynor (Short Trips: Snapshots)
- "The Cutty Wren" by Ann Kelly (Short Trips: The Ghosts of Christmas)
- "The Christmas Presence" by Simon Barnard & Paul Morris (Short Trips: The Ghosts of Christmas)
- "Lepidoptery for Beginners" by John Dorney (Short Trips: Defining Patterns)
- "One Step Forward, Two Steps Back" by Chris Thomas (Short Trips: Defining Patterns)
- "Homework" by Michael Coen (Short Trips: Defining Patterns)
- "The Slave War" by Una McCormack (Short Trips: The Quality of Leadership)
- "On a Pedestal" by Kathleen O. David (Short Trips: The Quality of Leadership)
- "The Monster Factory" by Alec Daniels (Shelf Life)
- "Relative Dimensions" by Andrew Cheverton (Shelf Life)
- "The Nameless City" by Michael Scott

=== Comics ===
- "Invasion of the Quarks" by John Canning (TV Comic 872–876)
- "The Killer Wasps" by John Canning (TV Comic 877–880)
- "Ice Cap Terror" by John Canning (TV Comic 881–884)
- "Jungle of Doom!" by John Canning (TV Comic 885–889)
- "Father Time" by John Canning (TV Comic 890–893)
- "Martha the Mechanical Housemaid" by John Canning (TV Comic 894–898)
- "Freedom by Fire" by David Brian (Doctor Who Annual 1969)
- "Atoms Infinite" by David Brian (Doctor Who Annual 1969)
- "The Vampire Plants" by David Brian (Doctor Who Annual 1970)
- "The Robot King" by David Brian (Doctor Who Annual 1970)
- "The World Shapers" by Grant Morrison, John Ridgway and Tim Perkins (Doctor Who Magazine 127–129)
- "Planet of the Dead" by Lee Sullivan and John Freeman (Doctor Who Magazine 141–142), although technically that isn't Jamie, but someone pretending to be him.
- "Bringer of Darkness" by Warwick Gray and Martin Geraghty (Doctor Who Magazine Summer Special 1993)
- "Land of the Blind" by W. Scott Gray and Lee Sullivan (Doctor Who Magazine 224–226)
