= The War Games =

050 – The War Games
- Doctor Who serial

Cast
- Doctor: Patrick Troughton – Second Doctor
- Companions: Frazer Hines – Jamie McCrimmon; Wendy Padbury – Zoe Heriot
- Others: David Savile – Lt Carstairs; Jane Sherwin – Lady Jennifer Buckingham; Noel Coleman – General Smythe; Richard Steele – Commandant Gorton; Terence Bayler – Major Barrington; Hubert Rees – Captain Ransom; David Valla – Lieutenant Crane; Esmond Webb – Sgt. Major Burns; Brian Forster – Sergeant Willis; Pat Gorman – Military Policeman; Peter Stanton – Military Chauffeur; David Garfield – Von Weich; Gregg Palmer – Lieutenant Lucke; John Livesey, Bernard Davies – German Soldiers; Philip Madoc – War Lord; Edward Brayshaw – War Chief; James Bree – Security Chief; Vernon Dobtcheff – Chief Scientist; John Atterbury – Alien Guard; Charles Pemberton – Alien Technician; Bill Hutchinson – Sgt. Thompson; Terry Adams – Corporal Riley; Leslie Schofield – Leroy; Rudolph Walker – Harper; Michael Lynch – Spencer; Graham Weston – Russell; David Troughton – Moor; Peter Craze – Du Pont; Michael Napier Brown – Arturo Villar; Stephen Hubay – Petrov; Tony McEwan – Redcoat; Bernard Horsfall, Trevor Martin, Clyde Pollitt – Time Lords; Clare Jenkins – Tanya Lernov

Production
- Directed by: David Maloney
- Written by: Terrance Dicks and Malcolm Hulke
- Script editor: Terrance Dicks (uncredited)
- Produced by: Derrick Sherwin
- Executive producer: None
- Music by: Dudley Simpson
- Production code: ZZ
- Series: Season 6
- Running time: 10 episodes, 25 minutes each
- First broadcast: 19 April 1969
- Last broadcast: 21 June 1969

Chronology
← Preceded by The Space Pirates	Followed by → Spearhead from Space

The War Games is the seventh and final serial of the sixth season of the British science fiction television series Doctor Who, which originally aired in ten weekly parts from 19 April to 21 June 1969.

In the serial, an unnamed alien race led by the War Lord kidnap and brainwash soldiers from wars throughout Earth's history to fight in war games on another planet as part of the aliens' plot to conquer the galaxy. The time travelling Second Doctor and his travelling companions Jamie McCrimmon and Zoe Heriot form a resistance army to stop this plot and return the kidnapped soldiers to their correct times on Earth.

The War Games was the last regular appearance of Patrick Troughton as the Doctor and the last serial to be recorded in black and white. It also marks the last regular appearances of Wendy Padbury and Frazer Hines as companions Zoe and Jamie, and the first appearances of the Doctor's race, the Time Lords, and their home planet, Gallifrey. The latter was not named until The Time Warrior (1973).

== Plot ==
On an alien planet, the Doctor uncovers a plot to conquer the Galaxy with brainwashed soldiers abducted from Earth and forced to fight in simulated "war games", representing the periods in history from which they were taken. The aliens' aim is to produce a super-army from the survivors; to this end, they have been aided by a renegade Time Lord, calling himself the War Chief.

Joining forces with rebel soldiers who have broken their conditioning, the Doctor and his companions foil the plot and end the fighting. The War Chief is apparently killed when the leader of the aliens, the War Lord, realises he has been plotting against him. The Doctor admits he needs the help to return the soldiers to their own timelines, and reveals that he is a member of the race of Time Lords. By calling on his own people for help, he risks capture for his own past crimes, including the theft of his TARDIS. After sending the message, he and his companions attempt to evade capture, but are caught.

Having returned the soldiers to Earth, the Time Lords place the War Lord on trial and dematerialise him. They erase Zoe and Jamie's memories of travelling with the Doctor, and return them to the respective point in time when each of them first entered the TARDIS. They then place the Doctor on trial for stealing a TARDIS and breaking the law of non-interference. The Doctor presents a spirited defence, citing his many battles against the evils of the universe. Accepting this defence, the Time Lords proclaim that his punishment is exile to Earth in the 20th century – a planet and period of which he is fond. The Doctor points out he is too well known on Earth, so the Time Lords tell him he will change his appearance, as he has before, and present him with images of five faces. He does not like any of them; impatient, the Time Lords inform him that a decision has been made for him. He cries out indignantly as the forced regeneration is triggered.

== Production ==
As the TARDIS crew try to escape the Time Lords in Episode Ten, brief clips from The Web of Fear and Fury from the Deep are used to show the TARDIS in locations supposedly out of the Time Lords' reach. A model shot from Episode 1 of The Wheel in Space is used after Zoe is sent back to her own time and place by the Time Lords. Since this episode is missing, the shot sampled in The War Games is the only known surviving footage from this episode. Similarly, the shot of the TARDIS landing vertically on the sea is sampled from Fury from the Deep Episode 1, which is the only surviving footage from this episode.

=== Casting ===
Patrick Troughton's eldest son David made his second appearance in Doctor Who in Episode Six of this story as Private Moor, having first appeared in The Enemy of the World (1968). He subsequently appeared as King Peladon in The Curse of Peladon in 1972, and then as Professor Hobbes in "Midnight" in 2008. Gregg Palmer previously played a Cyberman in The Tenth Planet in 1966. Jane Sherwin who played Lady Jennifer Buckingham was producer Derrick Sherwin's wife.

Terence Bayler had previously played Yendom in The Ark (1966). Hubert Rees had previously appeared in Fury from the Deep (1968) and would return for The Seeds of Doom (1976). Edward Brayshaw had previously played Leon Colbert in The Reign of Terror (1964). James Bree later played Nefred in Full Circle (1980) and the Keeper of the Matrix in The Ultimate Foe (1986). Leslie Schofield later played Calib in The Face of Evil (1977). Peter Craze had previously played Dako in The Space Museum (1965) and would appear again as Costa in Nightmare of Eden (1979). David Savile would later appear as Winser in The Claws of Axos (1971) and as Colonel Crichton in "The Five Doctors" (1983). Clyde Pollitt returned as a Time Lord in The Three Doctors (1973).

Philip Madoc had previously appeared as Eelek in The Krotons (1969), and the film Daleks – Invasion Earth: 2150 A.D. (1966) as Dalek collaborator, Brockley. He would go on to play Doctor Solon in The Brain of Morbius (1976) and Fenner in The Power of Kroll (1979). Bernard Horsfall (First Time Lord) had previously appeared as Lemuel Gulliver in The Mind Robber (1968), and would subsequently play Taron in Planet of the Daleks (1973) and Chancellor Goth in The Deadly Assassin (1976). In 2003 he appeared in Davros, a Doctor Who audio drama produced by Big Finish Productions. David Garfield later played Neeva in The Face of Evil (1977) and Professor Stream in the Sixth Doctor audio drama The Hollows of Time. Vernon Dobtcheff later played Shamur in the Fifth Doctor audio drama The Children of Seth.

== Broadcast and reception ==
Episode	Title	Run time	Original release date	UK viewers (millions)	Archive
1	"Episode One"	25:00	19 April 1969	5.5	16mm t/r
2	"Episode Two"	25:00	26 April 1969	6.3	16mm t/r
3	"Episode Three"	24:30	3 May 1969	5.1	16mm t/r
4	"Episode Four"	23:30	10 May 1969	5.7	16mm t/r
5	"Episode Five"	24:30	17 May 1969	5.1	16mm t/r
6	"Episode Six"	22:53	24 May 1969	4.2	16mm t/r
7	"Episode Seven"	22:28	31 May 1969	4.9	16mm t/r
8	"Episode Eight"	24:37	7 June 1969	3.5	16mm t/r
9	"Episode Nine"	24:34	14 June 1969	4.1	16mm t/r
10	"Episode Ten"	24:23	21 June 1969	5.0	16mm t/r

The BBC's Audience Research Report showed that The War Games was received positively, though not enthusiastically, by viewers.

Paul Cornell, Martin Day, and Keith Topping wrote of the serial in The Discontinuity Guide (1995), "It might be six episodes too long, but The War Games is pivotal in the history of Doctor Who. The introduction of the Time Lords ... sees the series lose some of its mystery, but gain a new focus." In The Television Companion (1998), David J. Howe and Stephen James Walker stated that the serial "gets off to a cracking start", though they noted that "A commonly expressed view is that, after this strong beginning, the story becomes dull and repetitive, picking up again only in the closing stages when the Time Lords are introduced." They praised the design work of the different war zones, the dialogue, and the conclusion. In 2009, Radio Times reviewer Patrick Mulkern was positive towards the detailed scripts and the various villains, especially the War Chief. The A.V. Club reviewer praised the way the serial subverted viewers' expectations of a typical historical story. He noted that there was padding to fill the running time, but felt that it was done well and that it worked better than in The Dalek Invasion of Earth. He also wrote positively of Madoc's War Lord and Jamie and Zoe's departure, and said that the story purposefully "doesn't resolve neatly or satisfyingly". Alasdair Wilkins of io9 praised Troughton's performance and the way that it was structured to "constantly [expand] the story's scope", though he admitted there was still padding. In a 2010 article, Charlie Jane Anders of the same site listed the cliffhanger to the ninth episode – in which the Doctor and his companions escape the base and try to get back to the TARDIS but their movements are slowed down as the Doctor tries to unlock and open the TARDIS doors – as one of the greatest Doctor Who cliffhangers ever.

A viewing of The War Games, and in particular the character of Jamie McCrimmon, inspired author Diana Gabaldon to set her Outlander series in Jacobite Scotland, and to name its protagonist "Jamie".

== Commercial releases ==
=== In print ===
Doctor Who and the War Games
- Author: Malcolm Hulke
- Cover artist: John Geary
- Series: Doctor Who book: Target novelisations
- Release number: 70
- Publisher: Target Books
- Publication date: 25 September 1979
- ISBN: 0-426-20082-9

A novelisation of this serial, written by Malcolm Hulke, was published by Target Books in September 1979, entitled Doctor Who and The War Games.

In January 2011, an audiobook of the novelisation was released, read by David Troughton.

=== Home media ===
The front cover of the UK version of the DVD.

This serial was released in the UK in February 1990 in a two-tape set in episodic form. It was re-released in remastered format in September 2002. Since this VHS re-release, better quality film prints of the story were located at the BFI, and were used for the DVD release which occurred on 6 July 2009. This DVD release contained a number of bonus features, including an excerpt from the in-progress fan film Devious, featuring the last appearance of Jon Pertwee as the Third Doctor.

The "Regenerations" box set, released on 24 June 2013, includes The War Games but with no special features.

== The War Games in Colour ==
A 90-minute colourised version of the serial was broadcast on 23 December 2024 on BBC Four to a consolidated audience of 370,000 before becoming available on BBC iPlayer. The serial was colourised and enhanced with updated visual and sound effects and a new musical score, and featured a new regeneration sequence. The colourisation was completed by Rich Tipple, Kieran Highman, Timothy K. Brown, Scott Burditt, Tom Newsom and Aaron J. Climas. Tipple had previously led the colourisation of The Daleks in Colour (2023). The updated music features Murray Gold's theme for The Master, which appears to confirm a long-held fan theory that the War Chief is an incarnation of The Master.
