= Atterbury =

Atterbury is a surname. Notable people with the surname include:

- Francis Atterbury (1663–1732), English politician and bishop
- Grosvenor Atterbury (1869–1956), American architect
- John Atterbury, actor
- Luffman Atterbury, musician
- Malcolm Atterbury, stage and vaudeville actor who was born in Philadelphia
- Paul Atterbury, antiques expert and television personality
- Septimus Atterbury, early English footballer
- William Wallace Atterbury (1866–1935), Brigadier General during World War I

== See also ==
- Camp Atterbury, a training base of the Indiana National Guard near Edinburgh, Indiana
- Atterbury Air Force Base, a former United States Air Force base near Columbus, Indiana
- Atterbury Park, a small urban nature reserve in Milton Keynes, England
