= Hamish Wilson =

Scottish actor (1942–2020)

- Wilson as Jamie McCrimmon in the 1968 Doctor Who serial The Mind Robber
- Born: 13 December 1942; Glasgow, Scotland
- Died: 26 March 2020 (aged 77); Rutherglen, Lanarkshire, Scotland
- Occupations: Actor; radio producer
- Years active: 1959–2013
- Children: 3

Hamish Wilson (13 December 1942 – 26 March 2020) was a Scottish actor.

== Early life ==
Born in Glasgow, Wilson trained as an actor at the Royal Scottish Academy of Music and Drama.

== Career ==
Wilson's early work included an appearance on the first series of The Vital Spark (in the only surviving episode of that series, 1966's "A Drop O' The Real Stuff"). He briefly took over the role of Jamie McCrimmon for part of two episodes of the 1968 Doctor Who serial The Mind Robber when series regular Frazer Hines was ill with chickenpox and unable to attend the recording. The change of actor was written in as part of the story when Jamie is turned into a cardboard cut-out and has his face removed by the Master of the Land of Fiction. The Second Doctor's first attempt to reconstruct his face is unsuccessful. Eventually, Jamie's real face is restored when Hines recovered. He later contributed to the documentary and audio commentary of the 2005 DVD release of The Mind Robber.

At the time of his Doctor Who appearance, Wilson was working in London for a furniture removal firm. His other work includes numerous television guest appearances in programmes such as Softly, Softly and Monarch of the Glen. Wilson also acted in Greyfriars Bobby (1961) and TimeLock (2013). Starting in the 1970s, Wilson became a continuity announcer with STV in Glasgow, he then became a radio producer, working with Radio Forth and Radio Clyde before moving to the BBC's Scottish radio drama unit in Edinburgh in 1989, where he made programmes for BBC Radio Scotland as well as BBC Radio 3 and BBC Radio 4. He received a fellowship from the Royal Scottish Academy of Music and Drama in 1996. He was also a staff member at the Guildhall School of Music and Drama.

== Death ==
Wilson died from COVID-19 in hospital near his home in Bladnoch, near Wigtown, Dumfriesshire on 26 March 2020, at age 77, during the COVID-19 pandemic in Scotland. He is survived by his wife Diana and daughters Emma, Abigail and Alice.
