= The Colony of Lies =

2003 novel by Colin Brake

- Author: Colin Brake
- Series: Doctor Who book: Past Doctor Adventures
- Release number: 61
- Subject: Featuring: Second Doctor; Zoe and Jamie
- Publisher: BBC Books
- Publication date: 7 July 2003
- Pages: 275
- ISBN: 0-563-48606-6
- Preceded by: Loving the Alien
- Followed by: Wolfsbane

The Colony of Lies is a BBC Books original novel written by Colin Brake and based on the long-running British science fiction television series Doctor Who. It features the Second Doctor, Zoe and Jamie. It also features appearances by the Seventh Doctor and Ace, with the Seventh Doctor meeting the Second in a virtual interface to pass on a vital message that will allow him to resolve the current crisis.

== Plot ==
The independent Earth Colony Axista Four was supposedly founded in the 2439 by Stewart Ransom, a noted humanitarian. Arriving on the colony one hundred years later, the Doctor, Zoe and Jamie find a near-civil war.

'Realists' have abandoned Ransome's 'back to basics' ideals and are raiding the remains of the colony ship to further their technological advancements. The 'Loyalists' are in danger of extinction. In a little-known underground bunker, aliens who claim to be the planet's first colonists are stirring.

Hopeful colonists hope Random's daughter, Kirann, can be revived from cryogenic suspension and reunited the colony. This does not work out as expected.
