= The Wheel of Ice =

2012 novel by Stephen Baxter

- Author: Stephen Baxter
- Series: Doctor Who book
- Subject: Featuring: Second Doctor; Jamie and Zoe
- Publisher: BBC Books
- Publication date: August 2012
- Pages: 359
- ISBN: 978-1-84990-182-6 (standard)

The Wheel of Ice is a 2012 original novel written by Stephen Baxter and based on the long-running British science fiction television series Doctor Who. It features the Second Doctor, Jamie and Zoe. It was released both as a standard edition hardback and an audio book read by David Troughton (son of Second Doctor actor Patrick Troughton).
