= The Space Pirates =

1969 Doctor Who serial

049 – The Space Pirates
- Doctor Who serial

Cast
- Doctor: Patrick Troughton – Second Doctor
- Companions: Frazer Hines – Jamie McCrimmon; Wendy Padbury – Zoe Heriot
- Others: Gordon Gostelow – Milo Clancey; Lisa Daniely – Madeleine Issigri; Esmond Knight – Dom Issigri; Jack May – General Hermack; Donald Gee – Major Ian Warne; George Layton – Technician Penn; Nik Zaran – Lt Sorba; Anthony Donovan – Space Guard; Dudley Foster – Caven; Brian Peck – Dervish; Steve Peters – Pirate Guard

Production
- Directed by: Michael Hart
- Written by: Robert Holmes
- Script editor: Derrick Sherwin
- Produced by: Peter Bryant
- Executive producer: None
- Music by: Dudley Simpson
- Production code: YY
- Series: Season 6
- Running time: 6 episodes, 25 minutes each
- Episode(s) missing: 5 episodes (1, 3–6)
- First broadcast: 8 March 1969
- Last broadcast: 12 April 1969

Chronology
← Preceded by The Seeds of Death	Followed by → The War Games

The Space Pirates is the mostly missing sixth serial of the sixth season of the British science fiction television series Doctor Who, which originally aired in six weekly parts from 8 March to 12 April 1969.

In this serial, the TARDIS materialises in Earth's future on a space beacon just before it is attacked by pirates, led by Caven (Dudley Foster). The travellers find themselves trapped in a sealed section of the beacon that is blown apart and flown to where the pirates will plunder it of the precious mineral argonite. They witness a conflict between the pirates and the Interstellar Space Corps, led by General Hermack (Jack May) and Major Warne (Donald Gee).

This is the second story written by Robert Holmes, who would subsequently become the show's script editor during the Tom Baker era. Only one of the six episodes is held in the BBC archives; five remain missing. Chronologically, this is the last story to contain missing episodes, which makes episode six the last episode of Doctor Who to be completely missing.

== Plot ==
Beacons on the space lanes are being blown up and plundered for precious argonite by a gang of space pirates led by Caven and his associate Dervish, with the beacon fragments being stolen via rocket propulsion. The Earth Space Corps cruiser V-41 notices the destruction of the beacon and, with General Hermack and Major Warne in charge, sets out to apprehend the pirates. The TARDIS crew arrive on Beacon Alpha Four. Caven and his men kill the beacon's security and seal the time travellers in part of the beacon before blowing it to pieces. Fortunately the beacon falls into discrete, sealed pieces and the Doctor, Jamie, and Zoe find themselves inside one. Prospector Milo Clancey, in his ship, the LIZ-79, rescues them – but the TARDIS is in a separate segment taken by the pirates.

The nearest inhabited world is Ta, dominated by the Issigri Mining Corporation, headed by Madeleine Issigri. The firm was founded by her father, Dom, and Clancey, with the latter being suspected of killing the former. Zoe has plotted the trajectory of the segments of the beacon to Ta and the Doctor and his companions soon find the pirate headquarters. Meanwhile, Caven forces Dervish to reroute some of the fragments to Lobos, a frontier world where Clancey is based, so as to throw suspicion on him. Hermack and his crew see through this ruse, but lose time orbiting Lobos. Madeleine has allied with the pirates, and the Doctor and his friends are imprisoned with Dom. Madeleine decides to break her alliance with Caven by trying to radio Hermack. Caven catches her, and reasserts his authority by threatening to kill her father.

Meanwhile, the Doctor and his companions escape, taking the Dom with them, and head to the LIZ-79. Caven forces Dervish to cut the oxygen supply to the ship, almost killing Dom and Clancey. Caven’s callousness finally convinces Madeleine to support him no longer and Dom makes contact with Hermack, persuading him of the truth. Caven, now desperate, threatens to destroy Ta and the orbiting V-41 using a series of bombs. The Doctor manages to disengage the triggering device, while Warne blows up the pirate ship. As Hermack’s ship lands, Madeleine looks forward to reuniting with her father, but knows she will also be imprisoned as an accomplice, while the Doctor and his companions prepare to seek out the TARDIS on one of the beacon fragments.

== Production ==
Episode	Title	Run time	Original release date	UK viewers (millions)	Archive
1	"Episode One"^{†}	24:11	8 March 1969	5.8	Only audio, stills and/or fragments exist
2	"Episode Two"	25:02	15 March 1969	6.8	35mm film
3	"Episode Three"^{†}	23:50	22 March 1969	6.4	Only audio, stills and/or fragments exist
4	"Episode Four"^{†}	22:25	29 March 1969	5.8	Only audio, stills and/or fragments exist
5	"Episode Five"^{†}	24:44	5 April 1969	5.5	Only audio, stills and/or fragments exist
6	"Episode Six"^{†}	24:26	12 April 1969	5.3	Only audio, stills and/or fragments exist

^† Episode is missing

This serial was written as a replacement for The Dream Spinner by Paul Wheeler, which for technical reasons was dropped at a late stage in production. This is the last story to be produced by Peter Bryant, although it was originally intended that he receive the producer's credit on Doctor Who and the Silurians. This changed when Barry Letts was appointed the series' producer on a full-time basis.

Patrick Troughton, Frazer Hines and Wendy Padbury were all away on location filming The War Games during the production of episode six and appear only in pre-filmed inserts. Thus, this is one of only two 1960s episodes to have none of the regular cast present for a studio recording, the other being the 1965 story "Mission to the Unknown".

This was the first Doctor Who serial on which John Nathan-Turner worked as a floor assistant. Nathan-Turner would become the unit production manager of the show in 1977 and the producer in 1980, a role he held until the series' cancellation in 1989.

In his last convention appearance before his death, Troughton singled out The Space Pirates as a serial that was "very enjoyable" to film.

=== Missing episodes ===
All episodes, except Episode 2 (preserved as an original negative 35mm film telerecording), are missing from the BBC archives. Pre-filmed inserts from Episode 1 also exist, as well as the audio soundtrack for all episodes. Episode 6 of the story is chronologically the final missing episode of Doctor Who. Episode 2 survived due to it rather unusually being a 35mm film studio show recording - the BBC deemed it "historically significant" and retained their copy.

In addition, an off-air recording of Episode 2 was later discovered in the collection of an amateur video enthusiast. The episode is the earliest known existing home video recording of an episode of Doctor Who.

== Commercial releases ==
=== In print ===
The Space Pirates
- Author: Terrance Dicks
- Cover artist: Tony Clark
- Series: Doctor Who book: Target novelisations
- Release number: 147
- Publisher: Target Books
- Publication date: 15 March 1990
- ISBN: 0-426-20346-1

A novelisation of this serial, written by Terrance Dicks, was published by Target Books in March 1990. An audiobook, based on the novelisation was released in December 2016, read by Terry Molloy.

=== Home media ===
Episode 2 was released on VHS in 1991 on Doctor Who - The Troughton Years, the introduction for the episode being recorded in the Lime Grove Studios where Episode One had been taped. In November 2004, it was released on Region 2 DVD in the three-disc Lost in Time box set. The DVD also includes surviving pre-filmed inserts from Episode 1. In February 2003, the audio soundtrack was released on CD with linking narration by Frazer Hines.

== See also ==
- List of space pirates
