= Michael Turner (actor) =

South African actor (1921–2012)

- Born: Michael Pierce Turner; 19 July 1921; Tabankulu, East Province, South Africa
- Died: 14 July 2012 (aged 90); Wiltshire, England
- Occupation: Actor
- Notable work: Crossroads

Michael Turner (19 July 1921 — 14 July 2012) was a South African-born actor who appeared in numerous British films and television series from the early 1950s.

== Early life ==
Straight away upon leaving school at the age of 18, Turner went into the South African Air Force. After his demob in 1946, he came to England to enrol at the Royal Central School of Speech and Drama. There, he met his wife, actress Monica Kirton (m. 1947). Returning to South Africa in 1956, Turner and his wife set up a drama school in Natal. Unable to find any suitable students since anybody wanting to take acting seriously went to England, he returned to acting in Johannesburg, winning a "South African Actor of the Year Award". The couple returned to England in 1959, where the actor became a member of the National Theatre and had a career in film and TV.

== Career ==
These include Callan, Emergency Ward 10, The Avengers, Z-Cars, Doctor Who (in the serial The Wheel in Space), Van der Valk, Crown Court, Dixon of Dock Green, The New Avengers, Within These Walls, Angels, Cry Freedom, Boon, Pie in the Sky and The Bill. Arguably, his most well-known role was that of tycoon businessman J. Henry Pollard in the long running ITV soap Crossroads, a part he played off-and-on from 1980–1984.
