= Brian Hodgson =

British composer

- Born: 1938 (age 87–88); Liverpool, England
- Occupation: Composer

Brian Hodgson (born 1938) is a British television composer and sound technician. Born in Liverpool in 1938, Hodgson joined the BBC Radiophonic Workshop in 1962 where he became the original sound effects creator for the science fiction programme Doctor Who. He devised the sound of the TARDIS (which he created by running the back door key to his mother's house along a bass string of a gutted piano, then electronically treating the recording) and the voices of the Daleks, which he created by distorting the actors' voices and feeding them through a ring modulator. he also effectively scored four serials (The Wheel in Space, The Dominators, The Mind Robber, and The Krotons) under the credit of "Special Sound" and is named on the music cue sheets for The Invasion alongside Don Harper. He continued to produce effects for the programme until 1972 when he left the Workshop, leaving Dick Mills to produce effects for the remainder of the show's run.

Earlier, in 1966, with fellow workshop musician Delia Derbyshire and EMS founder Peter Zinovieff, he helped set up Unit Delta Plus, an organisation which they intended to use to create and promote electronic music. Based in a studio in Zinovieff's townhouse in Putney, they exhibited their music at a few experimental and electronic music festivals, including The Million Volt Light and Sound Rave at which The Beatles' "Carnival of Light" had its only public playing. After a troubled performance at the Royal College of Art, in 1967, the unit disbanded.

Also in the late sixties, Hodgson and Derbyshire, along with fellow musician David Vorhaus, set up the Kaleidophon studio in Camden Town. The studio produced electronic music for London theatre productions and, in 1968, the three partners used it to produce their first album as the band White Noise. Although later albums were essentially solo Vorhaus albums, the debut, An Electric Storm featured collaborations with Hodgson and Derbyshire and is now considered an important and influential album in the development of electronic music.

During this period the trio also contributed, using pseudonyms, to the Standard Music Library. Many of these recordings, including compositions by Hodgson using the name "Nikki St George", were later used on the seventies ITV science fiction rivals to Doctor Who; The Tomorrow People and Timeslip.

After leaving the Radiophonic Workshop, Hodgson set up the Electrophon studio in an ex-fruit warehouse at 8 Neal's Yard, Covent Garden. Hodgson withdrawing his BBC pension of around "two thousand pound" set up the studio with Delia Derbyshire, who contributed a single tape recorder. Delia in a "depressive state" soon left and it was a chance encounter with music composer John Lewis seeking Brian's advice on purchasing a synthesiser that lead to Lewis joining Hodgson. The pair under the duo 'Wavemaker' composed and produced two electronic albums for Polydor, 'Where Are We Captain?' in 1975 and 'New Atlantis' in 1977 which were reviewed favourably in the press.

In 1973, he worked with the Doctor Who composer Dudley Simpson, under the name "Electrophon", on the album In A Covent Garden (sometimes credited to "The Unexploded Myth"). It featured Hodgson and Simpson's arrangements of several classical compositions for synthesisers and a 16 piece orchestra. Their versions of Tchaikovsky's None But the Weary Heart and Debussy's "La fille aux cheveux de lin" later appeared in the Doctor Who serial "The Robots of Death". The duo also released the albums Zygoat in 1972, credited to the American composer for dance Burt Alcantara, and Further Thoughts On the Classics, in 1974. Besides records, Hodgson also spent his time at the studio writing scores for ballet and film including, with Derbyshire, the music for the 1973 horror film The Legend of Hell House.

In 1977, leaving the Electrophon studio in the hands of John Lewis, he returned to the Radiophonic Workshop to replace Desmond Briscoe as its organiser. In 1983, he became the head of the department, remaining there until circumstances forced him to resign in 1995.

In 1983, he appeared at Doctor Who's 20th Anniversary celebrations at Longleat alongside many cast and crew from the series.
