= Jane Sherwin =

British actress (1934–2022)

- Born: Eleanor Margaret Jane Parsons; 4 November 1934; Saint Vincent and the Grenadines
- Died: 16 December 2022 (aged 88); Richmond-upon-Thames, Surrey, England
- Occupation: Actor
- Years active: 1958–1981
- Spouses: Derrick Sherwin (m. 1957; div. 1982); Gordon Futter (m. 1987)
- Children: 1

Eleanor Margaret Jane Sherwin (née Parsons; 4 November 1934 – 16 December 2022) was a British actress, known for her appearances in science fiction television, with roles in the Doctor Who serial The War Games and Blake's 7.

From SVG, she trained at the Royal Academy of Dramatic Art, graduating in 1954. She started her career using her maiden name, appearing on television and in Provincial Repertory but took a break for a while to look after her three children. Returning to acting in the late 1960s, Jane adopted her marriage name (after her marriage to actor/producer Derrick Sherwin) and resumed her TV career.

After leaving her acting career and the breakup of her marriage, Sherwin took on voluntary work for good causes. These included Amnesty International (being the Central America Co-ordinator for the British Section), Refugees and the Homeless. She collated poetry for collections and held sessions at the St Michael and All Angels Church, Barnes, where she attended for over 50 years, writing and performing into old age.

Sherwin died on 16 December 2022, at the age of 88.

== Television roles ==
- Doctor Who: The War Games - Lady Jennifer Buckingham (1969)
- Paul Temple - Alex Bisset (1971)
- The Man Outside - Mrs. Thrush (1972)
- Softly, Softly: Task Force - Mrs. Sadler (1972)
- Hawkeye, the Pathfinder - Mrs. Watson (1973)
- Barlow at Large - Amanda (1974)
- Blake's 7: Pressure Point - Kasabi (1979)
- Agony - Chairwoman (1981)
- Cribb - Lady Mortimer (1981)
