= John Atterbury =

British actor (born 1941)

- Born: 4 August 1941 (age 83)
- Occupation: Actor

John Atterbury (born 4 August 1941) is a British actor.

== Filmography ==
- Doctor Who (TV series) (1968–1969) (4 episodes)
  - The Mind Robber: Episode 1 (1968)
  - The Mind Robber: Episode 4 (1968)
  - The Mind Robber: Episode 5 (1968)
  - The War Games: Part 4 (1969)
- Scarlett (TV miniseries) (1988) (1 episode)
  - Episode #1.4 as Clerk of the Court
- NASSER (1997)
- The Parent Trap (1998) as Gareth
- The Jump (TV series) (1998) (1 episode)
  - Episode #1.1 as the judge
- Gosford Park (2001) as Merriman
- Harry Potter and the Order of the Phoenix (2007) as Phineas Nigellus Black
- Elizabeth: The Golden Age (2007) as the marriage priest
- Midsomer Murders (2009)
  - Episode: The Great and the Food as Mr Fuller
- Robin Hood (2010) as Exchequer
- Love's Kitchen (2011)
- Darkest Hour (2017) as Sir Alexander Cadogan
