= David Maloney =

British television director and producer

David John Lee Maloney (14 December 1933 – 18 July 2006) was a British television director and producer, best known for his work on the BBC science-fiction series Doctor Who, Blake's 7 and The Day of the Triffids. The Guardian described him on his death as "one of that old school who could turn out 30-minute dramas in two days shooting time".

== Early life ==
Maloney was born in Alvechurch, Worcestershire, educated at King Edward VI Five Ways and served in the Royal Air Force before becoming an actor in repertory theatre.

== Career ==
Maloney joined the BBC as a television production assistant and trained to be a director at the corporation. His directing credits included the police series Z-Cars, Softly, Softly: Task Force and Juliet Bravo, and an adaptation of the Walter Scott novel Ivanhoe (1970).

He first worked on Doctor Who as a production assistant to Christopher Barry on the serial The Rescue (1965). He directed eight Doctor Who serials between 1968 and 1977. He became, along with Douglas Camfield, one of producer Philip Hinchcliffe's two favourite directors. He then became the producer of the first three seasons of Blake's 7 (1978–80), which included directing three episodes himself. He left Blake's 7 to produce the last series of When the Boat Comes In (1981). He also produced the BBC's adaptation of John Wyndham's novel The Day of the Triffids (1981).

== Later work ==
After his work in television drama, Maloney moved to factual programme-making and travelled the world making various documentaries for the ITV contractor Central. Towards the end of his life, he appeared in a number of TV and DVD documentaries about his work on Doctor Who. He also provided DVD commentaries for three of the serials he directed, The Mind Robber (1968), Genesis of the Daleks (1975) and The Talons of Weng-Chiang (1977).

== Death ==
Maloney died on 18 July 2006.

== Doctor Who ==
(director only)

- The Mind Robber (1968)
- The Krotons (1968–69)
- The War Games (1969)
- Planet of the Daleks (1973) (also the final scene of the preceding Frontier in Space (1973))
- Genesis of the Daleks (1975)
- Planet of Evil (1975)
- The Deadly Assassin (1976)
- The Talons of Weng-Chiang (1977)

== Blake's 7 ==
As well as producing the first three seasons of Blake's 7, Maloney also directed the following three episodes:

- Deliverance (with Michael E. Briant) (Episode 12 of Season 1)
- Star One (Episode 13 of Season 2)
- Powerplay (Episode 2 of Season 3)
