= Colin Brake =

English television writer and script editor

Colin Brake (born 1962) is an English television writer and script editor best known for his work for the BBC on programmes such as Bugs and EastEnders, or Greenborne. He has also written spin-offs from the BBC series Doctor Who. He lives and works in Leicester.

== Work ==
Brake began working on EastEnders in 1985 as a writer and script editor, being partly responsible for the introduction of the soap's first Asian characters Saeed and Naima Jeffery. From there, he went on to work as "script executive" on the popular Saturday night action adventure programme Bugs, before moving to Channel 5 in 1997 to be "script associate" on their evening soap Family Affairs.

In the early 2000s, Brake wrote episodes of the daytime soaps Doctors and the revival of Crossroads.

Away from television, Brake had his first Doctor Who related writing published as part of Virgin Publishing's Decalog short story collection in 1996. He then had his first novel Escape Velocity published by BBC Books in February 2001 as part of their Eighth Doctor Adventures range based on the television series Doctor Who. At the time, Brake was quoted as saying how appropriate it was that he was now writing for Doctor Who, as he was briefly considered as Eric Saward's replacement as script editor on the show - a job that eventually went to Andrew Cartmel instead.

Brake followed Escape Velocity with the Past Doctor Adventure The Colony of Lies in July 2003, and then with the audio adventure Three's a Crowd from Big Finish Productions in 2005. His New Series Adventures novel The Price of Paradise was released in September 2006. He has also written an audio for their Bernice Summerfield range, and a short story for their Short Trips range.

== Doctor Who books ==
- Escape Velocity, Eighth Doctor Adventures (2001)
- The Colony of Lies, Past Doctor Adventures (2003)
- The Spaceship Graveyard, Decide Your Destiny gamebook (2007)
- The Time Crocodile, Decide Your Destiny gamebook (2007)
- The Haunted Wagon Train, Decide Your Destiny gamebook (2007)
- The Price of Paradise, New Series Adventures (2006)
- Judgement of the Judoon, New Series Adventures (2009)

== Big Finish audios ==
- Doctor Who: Three's a Crowd (2005)
- Doctor Who: The Mind's Eye (2007)
- Jago and Litefoot: The Bloodchild Codex (2013)
