= Paul Farnsworth =

British author

Paul Farnsworth is a British author best known for his comedy writing, which began with contributions to Deadpan in 1994. Between 2000 and 2006, Farnsworth concentrated on producing comedy material for the website The University of the Bleeding Obvious. In its entry for 'Bleeding Obvious' The Concise New Partridge Dictionary of Slang makes the claim that "in 2003 the British satirical website 'University of the Bleeding Obvious' was one of the most popular comedy sites on the Internet." The final regular update was in February 2006.

Farnsworth is also known as the author of the Doctor Who Short Story uPVC, published in the BBC anthology More Short Trips. His involvement with Doctor Who fiction resulted from a period in which he was a regular contributor to fanzines, including the Doctor Who Appreciation Society's Cosmic Masque.

More recently he has contributed the story Cooker Island to the Bernice Summerfield Anthology Secret Histories, published by Big Finish.
