= Derrick Sherwin =

English television producer (1936–2018)

- Sherwin in the Doctor Who serial Spearhead from Space (1970)
- Born: Derrick George Sherwin; 16 April 1936; High Wycombe, Buckinghamshire, England
- Died: 17 October 2018 (aged 82)
- Occupations: Television producer, writer, story editor, actor
- Spouse: Jane Parsons (m. 1957; div. 1982)

Derrick George Sherwin (16 April 1936 – 17 October 2018) was an English television producer, writer, story editor and actor. After beginning his career in the theatre, Sherwin became an actor in television before moving into writing. He became the story editor on Doctor Who and, as the producer of the series in 1969, he oversaw the transition from black-and-white to colour by producing Patrick Troughton's final story and Jon Pertwee's first. He also co-produced Paul Temple for the BBC.

== Early life ==
Sherwin began his career in the theatre and worked as a junior set designer, scenic artist, scene shifter, stage manager and lighting designer. He also spent two years of national service in the Royal Air Force. Following this, he established himself as an actor in theatre, films and television. While still working as an actor, he also began work as a freelance writer, contributing scripts to series such as Crossroads and Z-Cars.

== Doctor Who ==
In 1967, during the tenure of Patrick Troughton as the Second Doctor, Sherwin was offered a story-editing role on Doctor Who by BBC Head of Serials Shaun Sutton. He was story editor/script editor on the stories from The Web of Fear to The Mind Robber, on the latter tale writing the first episode. He also wrote the script for The Invasion, which introduced the United Nations Intelligence Taskforce (UNIT), having adapted the original storyline supplied by Kit Pedler.

In 1968–1969, Sherwin began to take a greater role in the producing side of Doctor Who, and after the serial The Mind Robber, he became the unofficial assistant producer for the next three serials, with Terrance Dicks succeeding him as script editor. On The Space Pirates, Sherwin briefly resumed his old role as script editor, while Dicks was busy writing Troughton's last story, the epic 10-part season finale The War Games with Malcolm Hulke. Dicks credited Sherwin with the creation of the Time Lords, who were introduced in The War Games.

Sherwin was involved in the casting of Jon Pertwee in the lead role on the programme, and succeeded Peter Bryant as producer in 1969 for The War Games and Pertwee's debut, Spearhead from Space, making a small on-screen appearance as a car park attendant in the latter serial as he was still a member of the British Actors' Equity Association at the time. He had dismissed the actor originally cast in the part for not being able to perform the role adequately.

Sherwin was responsible for the idea of exiling the Doctor to Earth the end of The War Games, a decision he took in an attempt to improve falling viewing figures, reinvent the programme and bring more reality to Doctor Who by basing it more on Nigel Kneale's Quatermass serials from the 1950s. For this purpose, Sherwin created the United Nations Intelligence Taskforce (UNIT) in The Invasion as an organisation that the Doctor could become allied to on Earth during his exile. UNIT became a prominent feature of Doctor Who throughout the Third Doctor's era, when the series was produced by Sherwin's successor, Barry Letts. Sherwin left the series after Spearhead from Space.

After leaving Doctor Who, Sherwin maintained connections with the series. When Michael Grade attempted to cancel it in 1985, Sherwin offered to "take it off [his] hands" and "produce it independently", and also said he had repeated the offer with Peter Cregeen, the man responsible for Doctor Who's actual cancellation in 1989. He later contributed to several documentaries for the Doctor Who DVD range, as well as providing commentaries for the two stories he produced and surviving episodes of The Web of Fear and The Wheel in Space for the Lost in Time collection.

== Later work ==
Sherwin left Doctor Who to once again work alongside Peter Bryant, who persuaded him to join the production of Paul Temple (1969-1971). Sherwin later produced the television series The Man Outside (1972), Skiboy (1973), and The Perils of Pendragon (1974).

== Death ==
Sherwin died on 17 October 2018 following a long illness.

== Selected filmography ==
- Clue of the Silver Key (1961)
- Number Six (1962)
- The Vengeance of She (1968)

== Publications ==
- Who's Next? (2014) (autobiography). Fantom Films Ltd. ISBN 9781781961117
- The Perfect Assassin or Wroten's Law (2014). (novel). United p.c. ISBN 9783710303319

Preceded by Peter Bryant	Doctor Who Producer; 1969–70	Succeeded by Barry Letts

Preceded by Peter Bryant	Doctor Who Script Editor; 1967–68	Succeeded by Terrance Dicks

Preceded by Terrance Dicks	Doctor Who Script Editor; 1969	Succeeded by Terrance Dicks
