= Peter Bryant =

British actor and producer (1923–2006)

- Bryant in The Grove Family (1954-1957)
- Born: Peter Murray Bryant; 27 October 1923; London
- Died: 19 May 2006 (aged 82)
- Occupations: Television producer, script editor, literary agent, actor
- Known for: Doctor Who producer

Peter Bryant (27 October 1923 – 19 May 2006) was an English television producer, script editor and former actor. He acted in The Grove Family as a regular cast member and later became the producer of Doctor Who from 1967 to 1969 during Patrick Troughton's tenure as the Second Doctor. He also produced the series Paul Temple before becoming a literary agent.

== Career ==
Bryant was originally an actor and appeared in the 1950s soap opera The Grove Family. Later, he became a BBC Radio announcer while writing radio scripts as a sideline. This led to him becoming a script editor in the Radio Drama Department and eventually the head of the Drama Script Unit. In 1967 he transferred from radio to television, where head of serials Shaun Sutton put him to work with script editor Gerry Davis on Doctor Who as a "Story Associate" then story editor.

Having acted as associate producer on The Faceless Ones and The Evil of the Daleks, Bryant was tested out as full producer for The Tomb of the Cybermen, replacing Innes Lloyd, and later became full-time producer for the later Patrick Troughton stories from The Web of Fear to The Space Pirates. Bryant was also the script editor on the last 4 episodes of The Evil of the Daleks and the whole of The Abominable Snowmen, The Ice Warriors and The Enemy of the World. One of Bryant's last contributions to Doctor Who was the casting in June 1969 of Jon Pertwee as the Third Doctor. After the casting of Jon Pertwee as the new Doctor, Bryant left Doctor Who to become the new producer of Paul Temple, following the departure of Alan Bromly. Bryant soon brought over Derrick Sherwin to join him on Paul Temple. Bryant and Sherwin had previously worked together on Doctor Who.

Bryant later became a literary agent to writers and a casting agent to actors. One of his clients was Eric Pringle, who wrote the Doctor Who story The Awakening.

== Personal life ==
Bryant was married to actress Shirley Cooklin, who appeared in the Doctor Who serial The Tomb of the Cybermen, but they eventually divorced.

== Partial filmography ==
- Man of the Moment (1955) – Jack Grove (uncredited)
- It's a Great Day (1955) – Jack Grove

Preceded by Gerry Davis	Doctor Who Script Editor; 1967	Succeeded by Victor Pemberton

Preceded by Innes Lloyd	Doctor Who Producer; 1967	Succeeded by Innes Lloyd

Preceded by Victor Pemberton	Doctor Who Script Editor; 1967–68	Succeeded by Derrick Sherwin

Preceded by Innes Lloyd	Doctor Who Producer; 1968–69	Succeeded by Derrick Sherwin
