= Wendy Padbury =

British actress (born 1947)

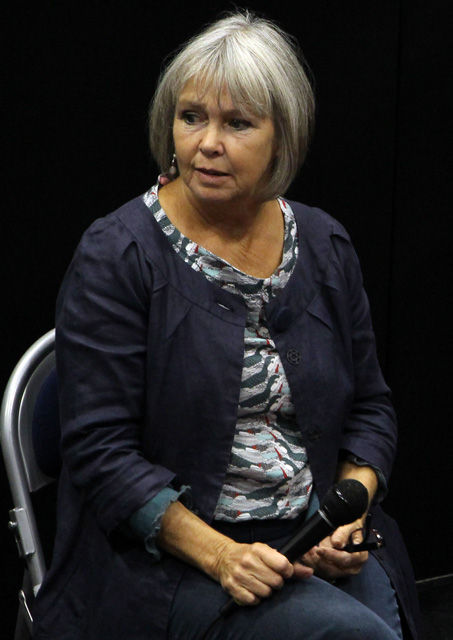
- Padbury in 2015
- Born: 7 December 1947 (age 78); Stratford-upon-Avon, Warwickshire, England
- Education: Alcester Grammar School
- Occupations: Actress; theatrical agent
- Years active: 1964–2010; 2023
- Known for: Zoe Heriot in Doctor Who (1968–1969); Crossroads
- Spouse: Melvyn Hayes (m. 1974; div. 1987)
- Children: 2, including Charlie Hayes

Wendy Padbury (born 7 December 1947) is a British actress and former talent agent. She has appeared in television series since 1966, including as Zoe Heriot, a companion to Patrick Troughton's Doctor in Doctor Who, from 1968 to 1969.

== Early life ==
Before becoming an actress Padbury took ballet classes, but these came to an end due to her flat feet. She replaced ballet with Saturday morning drama classes with a strong emphasis on elocution.

== Career ==
Padbury came to prominence in 1966 when she joined the cast of the long-running ATV soap opera Crossroads after she came second in the television talent contest Search for a Star. For her initial song in the contest she chose "(When I Marry) Mr. Snow" and made the unusual decision to sing a capella. Afterwards, the guest celebrity, Stubby Kaye, praised her very highly and predicted that she would go far, somewhat to the embarrassment of the presenter since, at that point, no one contestant should have been singled out. In Crossroads, she played the role of Stephanie "Stevie" Harris, foster daughter to the show's main character, Meg Mortimer (Noele Gordon).

She was cast as the Second Doctor's new companion, Zoe Heriot, in Doctor Who in 1968. She became very close to her co-stars Frazer Hines and Patrick Troughton, the latter playing the Doctor. Padbury tells many fond stories about the practical jokes they would play on each other during rehearsals.

Her connection with Doctor Who after she left the programme (at the same time as Hines and Troughton) was not quite over. She appeared in Doctor Who and the Daleks in the Seven Keys to Doomsday (1974), a stage play at the Adelphi Theatre London based on the television series, in which she played a companion named Jenny, opposite Trevor Martin as the Doctor. She then made an appearance, again with Hines and Troughton, in Doctor Who's 20th anniversary story, "The Five Doctors".

Her other roles include co-presenter of the second series of Score with the Scaffold. She appeared in three series of the children's television adventure programme Freewheelers playing the part of Sue Craig. She made a series of appearances as Rosemary Roberts in the British soap opera Emmerdale (then known by its original title Emmerdale Farm), coincidentally opposite Frazer Hines, one of the major stars of that show.

Her film appearances included a brief role in Charlie Bubbles (1967) with Albert Finney, and Piers Haggard's cult British horror film The Blood on Satan's Claw (1971) as the unfortunate Cathy Vespers. Coincidentally, she appeared alongside both actress Roberta Tovey who played Susan in the Doctor Who movie Dr Who and the Daleks, and actor Anthony Ainley who a decade later would take the role of The Master in Doctor Who, including the above-mentioned episode, "The Five Doctors".

In an interview with Doctor Who Magazine, Padbury explained that she no longer appeared at Doctor Who conventions nor spoke about her time on the programme, as she felt she no longer had anything new to say. However, following her retirement she returned to the convention scene and was a guest at Gallifrey One in 2009 where she spoke about how she first met then new Doctor actor, Matt Smith.

Padbury is now retired and lives in France, having previously worked as a theatrical agent. Nicholas Courtney, Colin Baker and Mark Strickson, all former Doctor Who actors, were among her clients. She discovered Matt Smith at the National Youth Theatre.

In 2023, Padbury reprised her role as Zoe Heriot in the series Tales of the TARDIS.

== Personal life ==
Padbury attended Alcester Grammar School in Warwickshire. She was married to Melvyn Hayes from 1974 to 1987, with whom she had two daughters, Joanna (born 1973) and actress Charlie (born 1977).

== Filmography ==
=== Films ===
Year	Title	Role	Notes
1967	Charlie Bubbles	Woman in Cafe	
1971	The Blood on Satan's Claw	Cathy Vespers	

=== Television ===
Year	Title	Role	Notes
1964	Crossroads	Stevie Harris	44 episodes
1968–69	Doctor Who	Zoe Heriot	48 episodes
1971	Z-Cars	Christina	Episode: Kid's Stuff
1971	Score with the Scaffold	Presenter	
1971–73	Freewheelers	Sue Craig	39 episodes (Series 5, 6 & 8)
1974	Crown Court	Fiona Sumner	Episode: The Getaway
1975	The Emperor's Nightingale	Kay-Su	
1976–81	You and Me	Presenter	BBC Schools Series
1976–77	Merry-Go-Round	Presenter	BBC Schools Series
1982–83	Over To You	Presenter	ITV Schools Series
1983	Doctor Who: The Five Doctors	Zoe Heriot	TV special
1987	Emmerdale Farm	Rosemary Roberts	6 episodes
1991	The Bill	Manageress	Episode: The Negotiator
2023	Tales of the TARDIS	Zoe Heriot	Episode: "The Mind Robber"
