= List of actors who have played the Doctor =

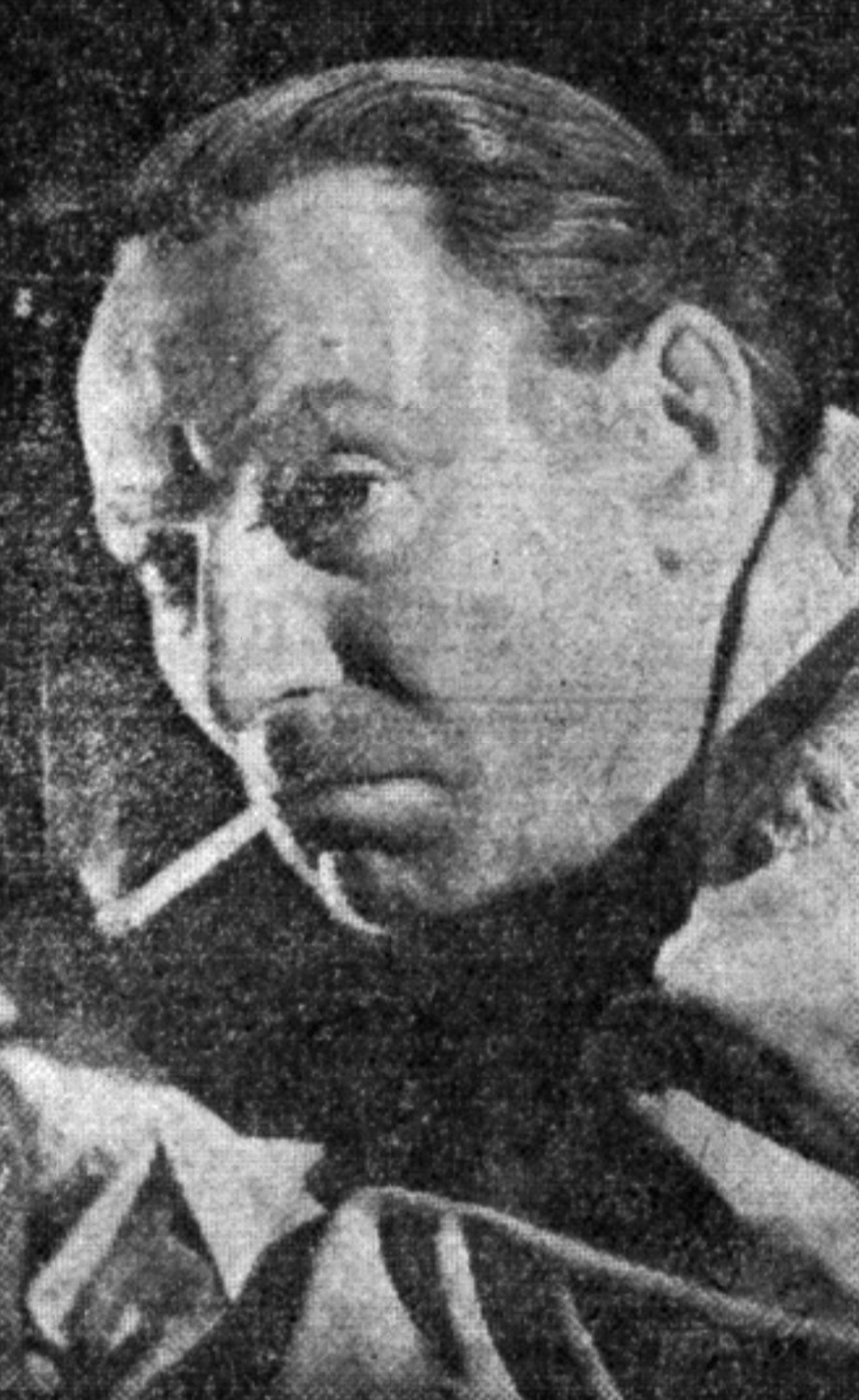
William Hartnell

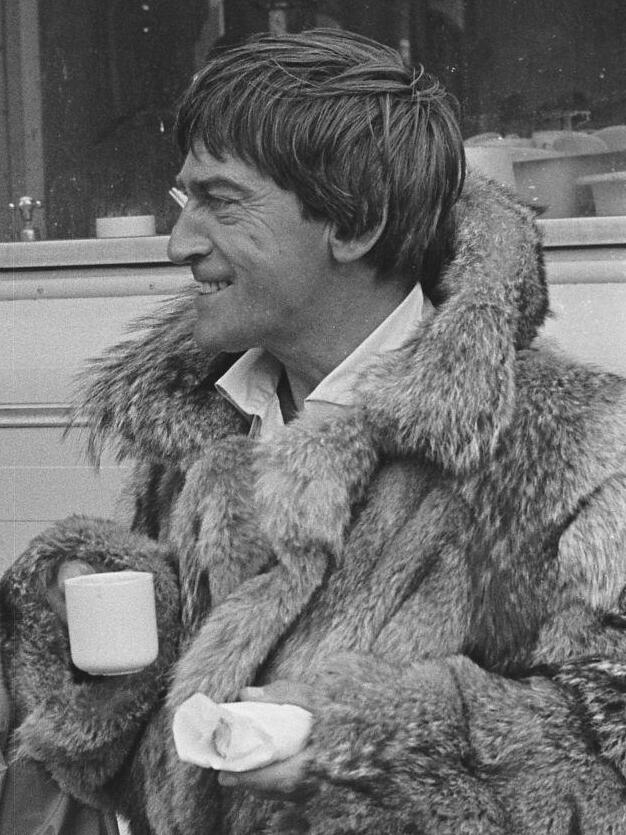
Patrick Troughton

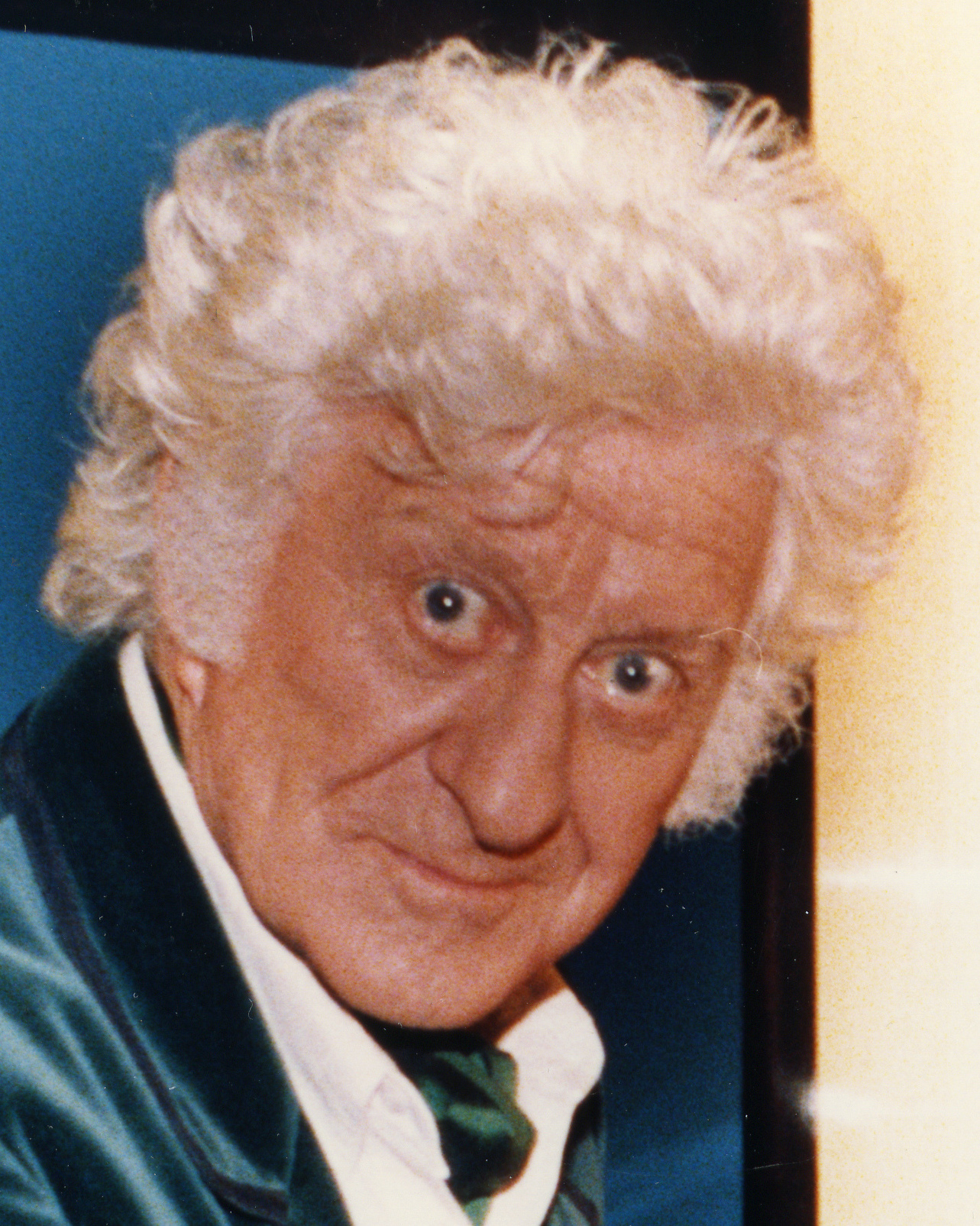
Jon Pertwee

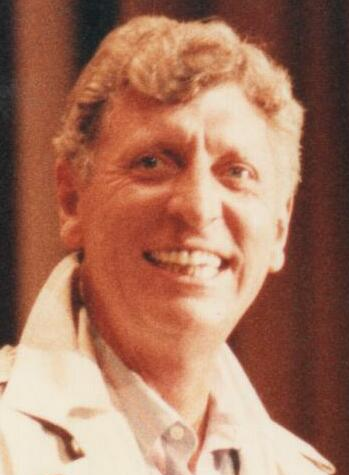
Tom Baker

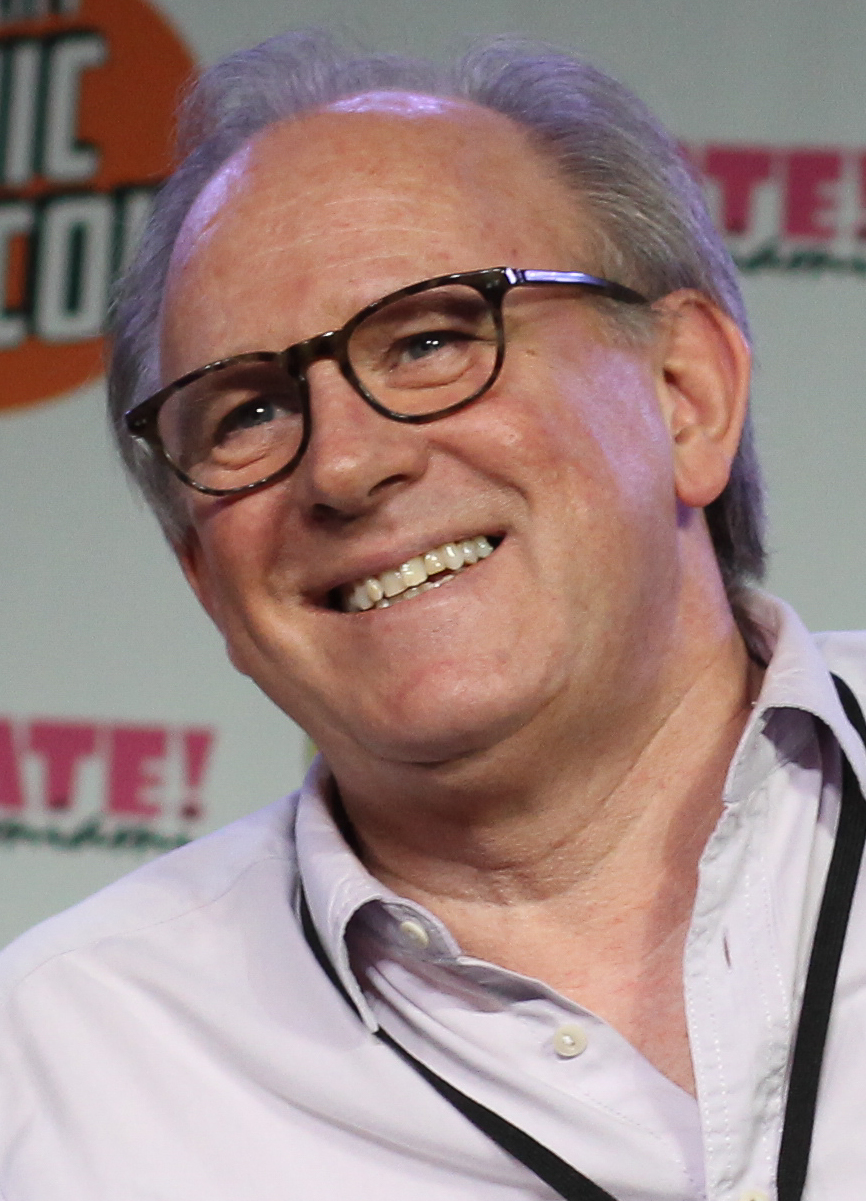
Peter Davison

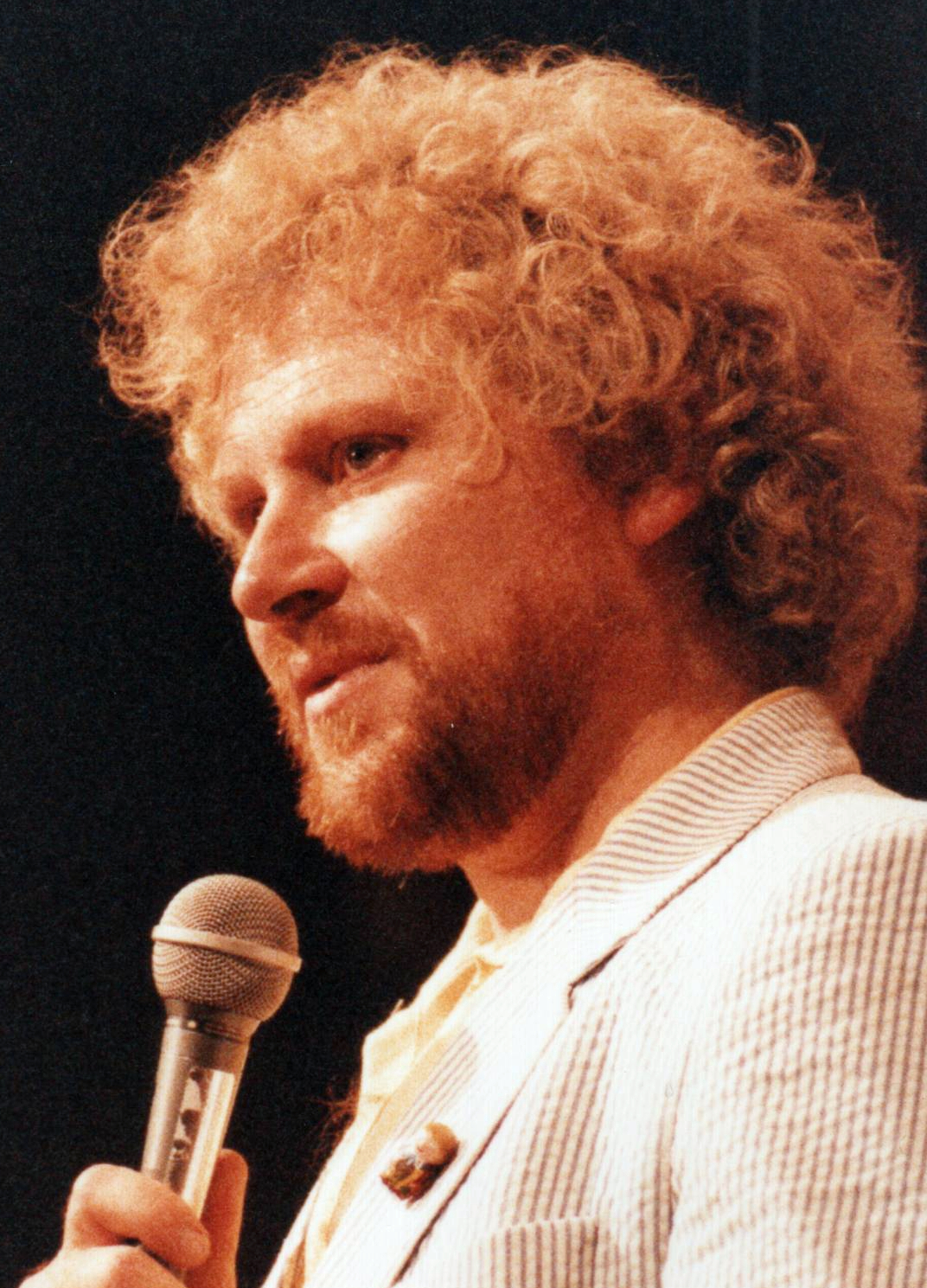
Colin Baker

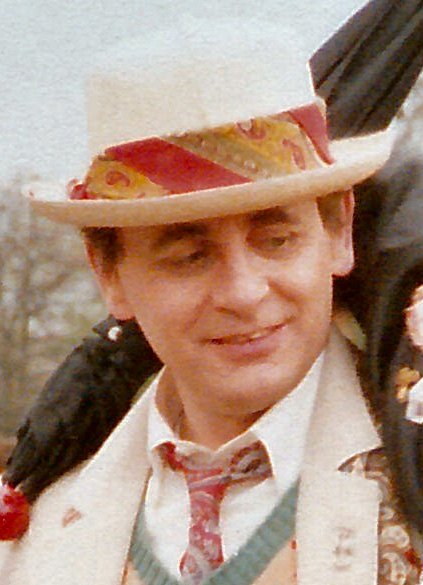
Sylvester McCoy

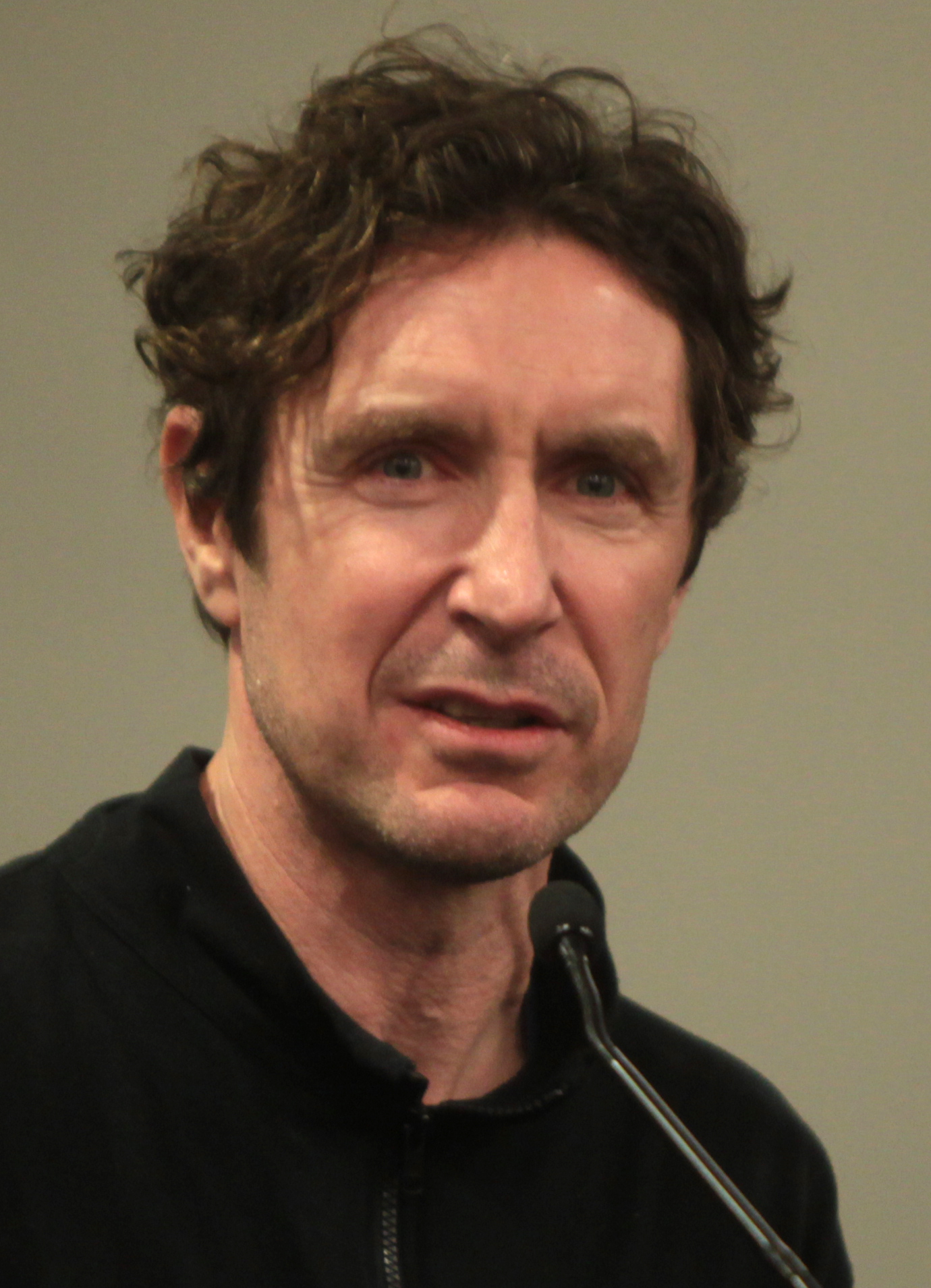
Paul McGann

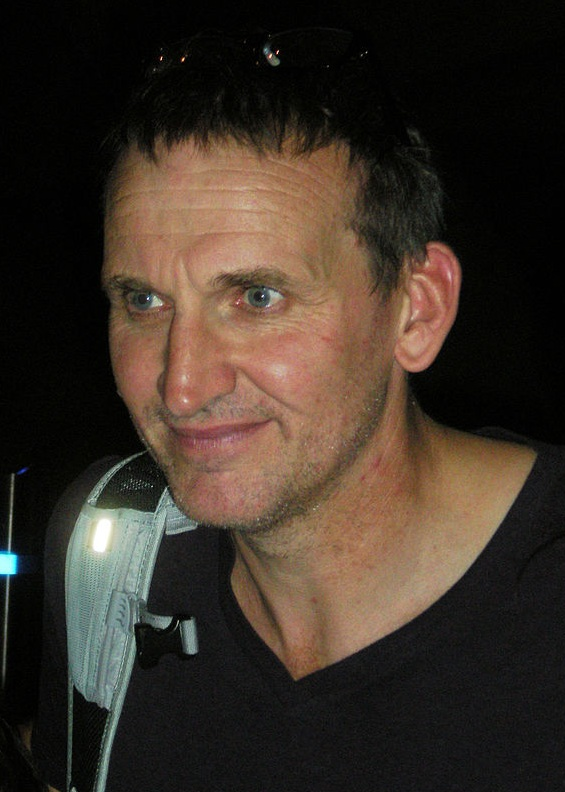
Christopher Eccleston

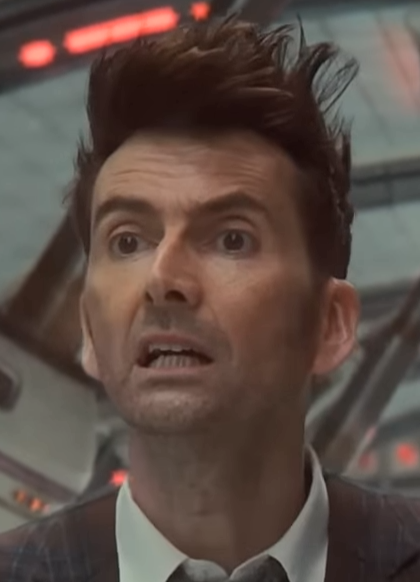
David Tennant

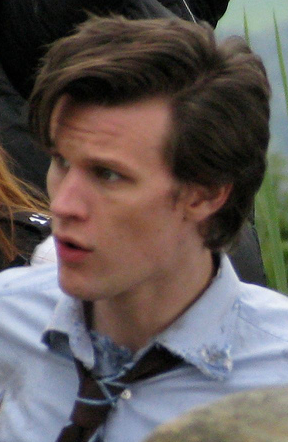
Matt Smith

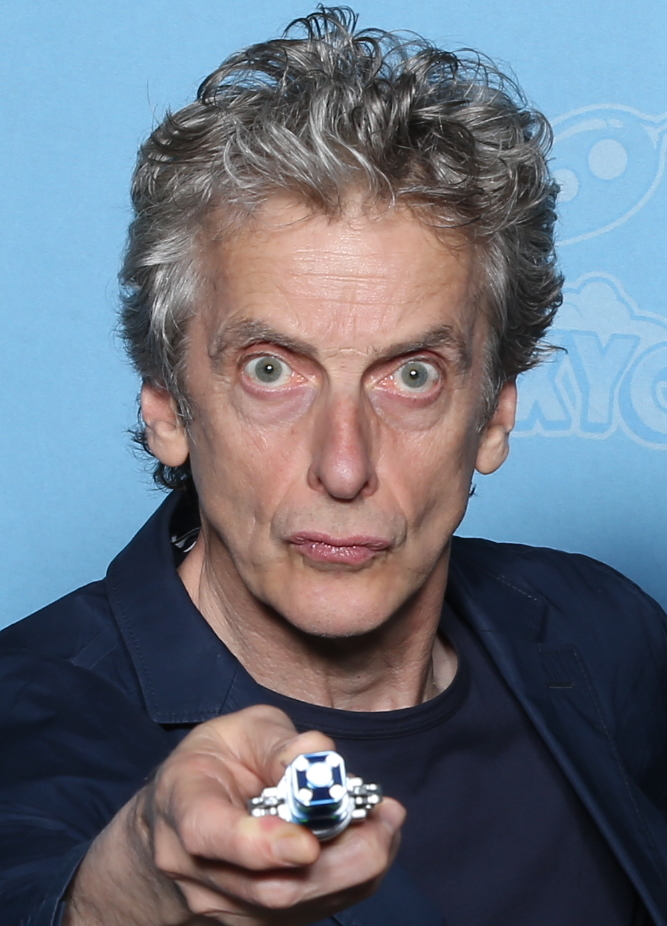
Peter Capaldi

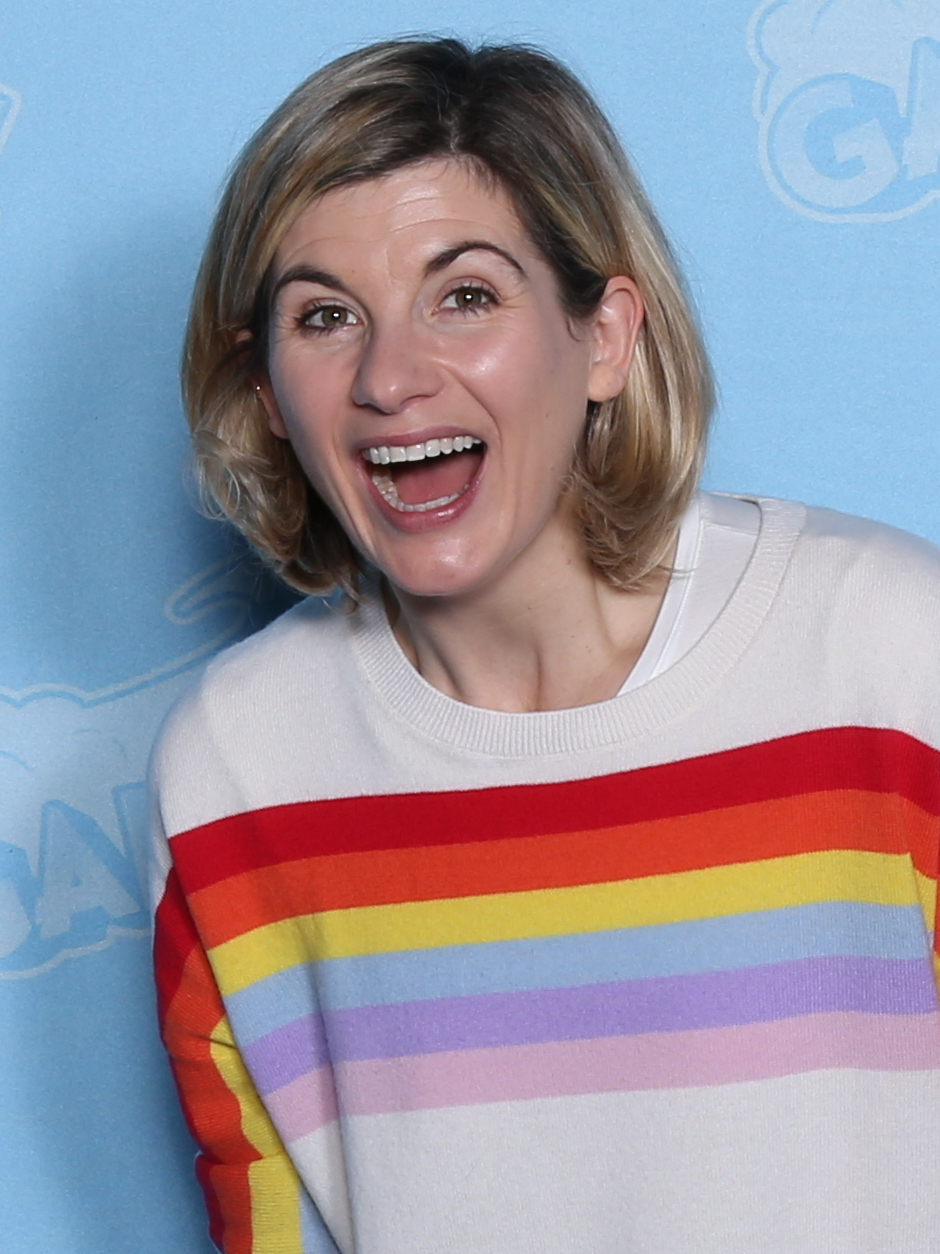
Jodie Whittaker

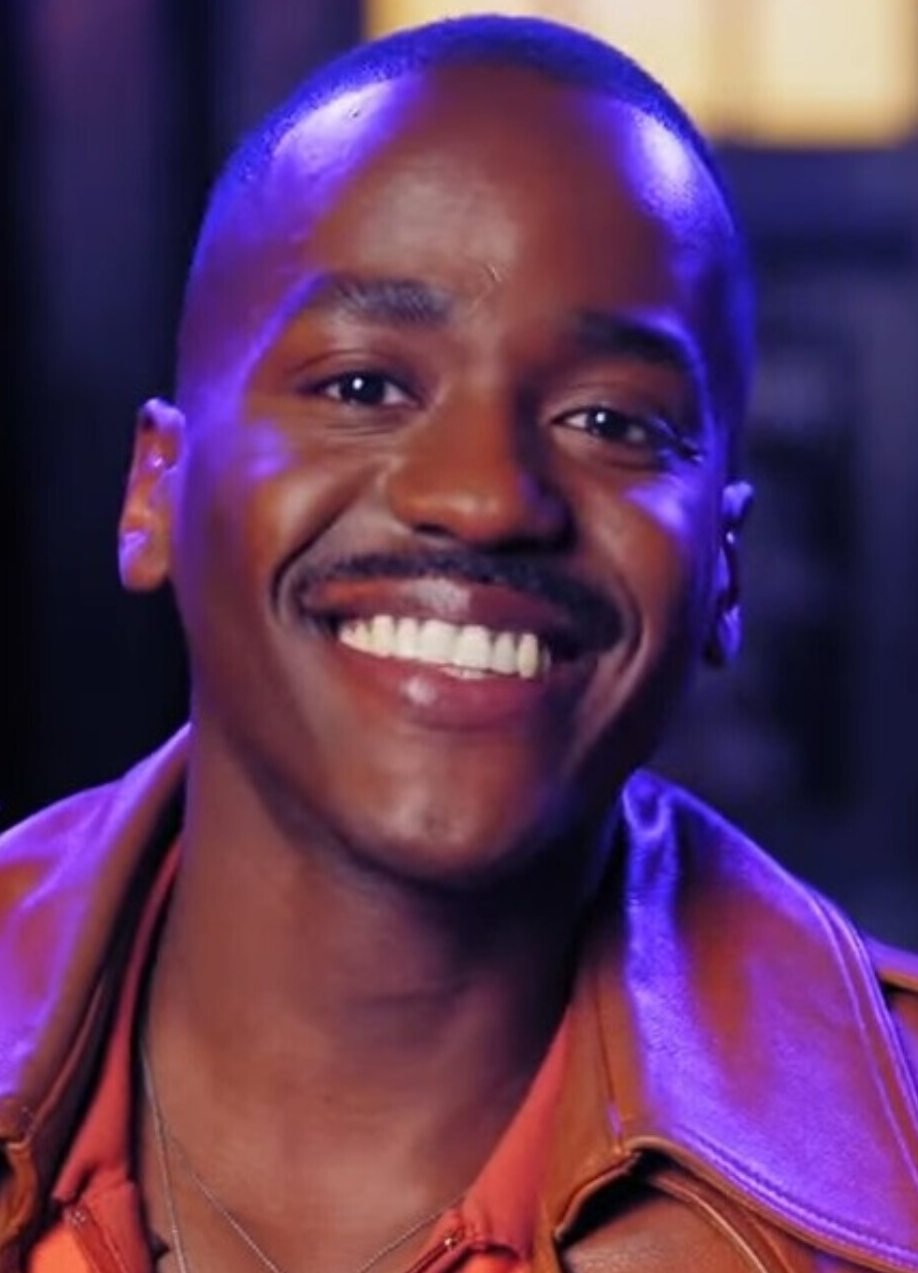
Ncuti Gatwa

Fourteen actors have portrayed the Doctor in a leading role in Doctor Who.

Fourteen actors have portrayed the Doctor in a leading role in the British science fiction television series Doctor Who. The series' protagonist, the Doctor is an alien from a species called Time Lords. The transition to each succeeding actor is explained within the narrative through the plot device of regeneration, which allows Time Lords a change of cellular structure when they near death, changing their appearance and personality. The first actor to portray the Doctor was William Hartnell beginning with An Unearthly Child (1963) through The Tenth Planet (1966). In the final moments of the serial, the First Doctor regenerated into Patrick Troughton's Second Doctor.

The most recent incarnation, the Fifteenth Doctor, was played by Ncuti Gatwa, who took over the role from David Tennant following the conclusion of "The Giggle" (2023). Gatwa departed the role in "The Reality War" (2025).

Outside of television many actors have played the Doctor in various BBC-licensed spin-offs on television, stage, radio, film, audio plays, and webcasts. The character's ability to periodically regenerate appearance and personality has facilitated the ability of new actors to take over the role – in official and unofficial productions – while in most cases maintaining continuity with the television series.

== Television ==
=== Series leads ===
Series leads
Actor (role)	Tenure	First regular appearance	Last regular appearance
William Hartnell (First Doctor)	23 November 1963 – 29 October 1966 (2 years, 340 days)	An Unearthly Child "An Unearthly Child"	The Tenth Planet; Episode 4
Patrick Troughton (Second Doctor)	5 November 1966 – 21 June 1969 (2 years, 228 days)	The Power of the Daleks; Episode One	The War Games; Episode Ten
Jon Pertwee (Third Doctor)	3 January 1970 – 8 June 1974 (4 years, 156 days)	Spearhead from Space; Episode One	Planet of the Spiders; Part Six
Tom Baker (Fourth Doctor)	28 December 1974 – 21 March 1981 (6 years, 83 days)	Robot; Part One	Logopolis; Part Four
Peter Davison (Fifth Doctor)	4 January 1982 – 16 March 1984 (2 years, 72 days)	Castrovalva; Part One	The Caves of Androzani; Part Four
Colin Baker (Sixth Doctor)	22 March 1984 – 6 December 1986 (2 years, 259 days)	The Twin Dilemma; Part One	The Ultimate Foe; Part Two
Sylvester McCoy (Seventh Doctor)	7 September 1987 – 6 December 1989 (2 years, 90 days)	Time and the Rani; Part One	Survival; Part Three
Paul McGann (Eighth Doctor)	12–27 May 1996 (15 days)	Doctor Who (TV movie)	Doctor Who (TV movie)
Christopher Eccleston (Ninth Doctor)	26 March 2005 – 18 June 2005 (84 days)	"Rose"	"The Parting of the Ways"
David Tennant (Tenth Doctor)	25 December 2005 – 1 January 2010 (4 years, 7 days)	"The Christmas Invasion"	"The End of Time"; Part Two
Matt Smith (Eleventh Doctor)	3 April 2010 – 25 December 2013 (3 years, 266 days)	"The Eleventh Hour"	"The Time of the Doctor"
Peter Capaldi (Twelfth Doctor)	23 August 2014 – 25 December 2017 (3 years, 124 days)	"Deep Breath"	"Twice Upon a Time"
Jodie Whittaker (Thirteenth Doctor)	7 October 2018 – 23 October 2022 (4 years, 16 days)	"The Woman Who Fell to Earth"	"The Power of the Doctor"
David Tennant (Fourteenth Doctor)	25 November 2023 – 9 December 2023 (14 days)	"The Star Beast"	"The Giggle"
Ncuti Gatwa (Fifteenth Doctor)	25 December 2023 – 31 May 2025 (1 year, 157 days)	"The Church on Ruby Road"	"The Reality War"

=== Other ===
Other
Actor	Title	Dates	Role	Ref.
Christopher Barry	The Brain of Morbius	24 January 1976	Faces seen during the Fourth Doctor's mind-bending battle against Morbius, retroactively revealed as past versions of the Doctor.	
Robert Banks Stewart	The Brain of Morbius	24 January 1976	Faces seen during the Fourth Doctor's mind-bending battle against Morbius, retroactively revealed as past versions of the Doctor.	
Christopher Baker	The Brain of Morbius	24 January 1976	Faces seen during the Fourth Doctor's mind-bending battle against Morbius, retroactively revealed as past versions of the Doctor.	
Philip Hinchcliffe	The Brain of Morbius	24 January 1976	Faces seen during the Fourth Doctor's mind-bending battle against Morbius, retroactively revealed as past versions of the Doctor.	
Douglas Camfield	The Brain of Morbius	24 January 1976	Faces seen during the Fourth Doctor's mind-bending battle against Morbius, retroactively revealed as past versions of the Doctor.	
Graeme Harper	The Brain of Morbius	24 January 1976	Faces seen during the Fourth Doctor's mind-bending battle against Morbius, retroactively revealed as past versions of the Doctor.	
Robert Holmes	The Brain of Morbius	24 January 1976	Faces seen during the Fourth Doctor's mind-bending battle against Morbius, retroactively revealed as past versions of the Doctor.	
George Gallaccio	The Brain of Morbius	24 January 1976	Faces seen during the Fourth Doctor's mind-bending battle against Morbius, retroactively revealed as past versions of the Doctor.	
Adrian Gibbs	Logopolis	28 February – 21 March 1981	The Watcher, who manifests as a harbinger of the Fourth Doctor's regeneration before merging into the Doctor's dying body.	
Richard Hurndall	"The Five Doctors"	23 November 1983	Hurndall replaced Hartnell, who had died in 1975, as the First Doctor for the programme's 20th anniversary special. He also appeared in character on Blue Peter alongside Peter Davison on 21 November 1983.	
Michael Jayston	The Trial of a Time Lord	6 September – 6 December 1986	The Valeyard, an evil version of the Doctor, an amalgamation of the Doctor's darker sides from between his twelfth and final incarnations.	
Geoffrey Hughes	The Trial of a Time Lord	29 November – 6 December 1986	Mr Popplewick, a matrix projection of the Valeyard.	
Toby Jones	"Amy's Choice"	15 May 2010	The Dream Lord, a darker, psychic manifestation of the Doctor.	
John Guilor	Planet of Giants DVD	20 August 2012	Re-dubbed voice work in the reconstruction of the original third and fourth episodes of this First Doctor serial.	
John Guilor	"The Day of the Doctor"	23 November 2013	Vocal cameo.	
John Hurt	"The Name of the Doctor"	18 May 2013	The Doctor's incarnation known as the War Doctor, whose actions in the Time War were so drastic that he deemed himself unworthy of the name "Doctor".	
John Hurt	"The Night of the Doctor"	14 November 2013	The Doctor's incarnation known as the War Doctor, whose actions in the Time War were so drastic that he deemed himself unworthy of the name "Doctor".	
John Hurt	"The Day of the Doctor"	23 November 2013	The Doctor's incarnation known as the War Doctor, whose actions in the Time War were so drastic that he deemed himself unworthy of the name "Doctor".	
Michael Jones	"Listen"	13 September 2014	The First Doctor as a child; uncredited.	
David Bradley	"The Doctor Falls"	1 July 2017	Similarly to Hurndall, Bradley replaced Hartnell as the First Doctor. Bradley also portrayed Hartnell in the docudrama An Adventure in Space and Time (2013).	
David Bradley	"Twice Upon a Time"	25 December 2017	Similarly to Hurndall, Bradley replaced Hartnell as the First Doctor. Bradley also portrayed Hartnell in the docudrama An Adventure in Space and Time (2013).	
David Bradley	"The Power of the Doctor"	23 October 2022	Similarly to Hurndall, Bradley replaced Hartnell as the First Doctor. Bradley also portrayed Hartnell in the docudrama An Adventure in Space and Time (2013).	
Jo Martin	"Fugitive of the Judoon"	26 January 2020	Previously unseen incarnation known as the Fugitive Doctor.	
Jo Martin	"The Timeless Children"	1 March 2020	Previously unseen incarnation known as the Fugitive Doctor.	
Jo Martin	"Once, Upon Time"	14 November 2021	Previously unseen incarnation known as the Fugitive Doctor.	
Jo Martin	"The Power of the Doctor"	23 October 2022	Previously unseen incarnation known as the Fugitive Doctor.	
Jo Martin	"The Story & the Engine"	10 May 2025	Previously unseen incarnation known as the Fugitive Doctor.	
Grace Nettle	"The Timeless Children"	1 March 2020	Incarnations of the Timeless Child, who is revealed to be the Doctor.	
Leo Tang	"The Timeless Children"	1 March 2020	Incarnations of the Timeless Child, who is revealed to be the Doctor.	
Jac Jones	"The Timeless Children"	1 March 2020	Incarnations of the Timeless Child, who is revealed to be the Doctor.	
Jesse Deyi	"The Timeless Children"	1 March 2020	Incarnations of the Timeless Child, who is revealed to be the Doctor.	
Sacha Dhawan	"The Power of the Doctor"	23 October 2022	The Master forces the Doctor to regenerate into him.	
Richard E. Grant	"Rogue"	8 June 2024	An "unknown" Doctor who appears amongst the Doctor's previous faces. This was confirmed by Russell T. Davies to represent the Doctor from Scream of the Shalka.	
Billie Piper	"The Reality War"	31 May 2025	The Fifteenth Doctor regenerates into a form resembling former companion Rose Tyler, portrayed by Billie Piper, though Piper's official role remains undisclosed.	

== Audio ==
Audio
Actor	Title	Dates	Role	Ref.
Geoffrey Bayldon	Auld Mortality	May 2003	Alternative First Doctor	
Geoffrey Bayldon	A Storm of Angels	January 2005	Alternative First Doctor	
David Warner	"Sympathy for the Devil"	June 2003	Alternative Third Doctor, known as the Unbound Doctor.	
David Warner	"Masters of War"	December 2008	Alternative Third Doctor, known as the Unbound Doctor.	
David Warner	The New Adventures of Bernice Summerfield. Volumes 3–7	24 August 2016 – 20 September 2022	Alternative Third Doctor, known as the Unbound Doctor.	
David Warner	Bernice Summerfield: The Story So Far: Volume Two	25 September 2018	Alternative Third Doctor, known as the Unbound Doctor.	
David Warner	"Time Lord Immemorial"	5 October 2023	Alternative Third Doctor, known as the Unbound Doctor.	
David Warner	"The War Master Part 1"	2 July 2024	Alternative Third Doctor, known as the Unbound Doctor.	
David Collings	"Full Fathom Five"	August 2003	Alternative Doctor	
Ian Brooker	"Full Fathom Five"	August 2003	New incarnation of Collings' Doctor	
Michael Jayston	"He Jests at Scars..."	September 2003	Alternate reality version of the Valeyard	
Michael Jayston	"Trial of the Valeyard"	17 December 2013	The Valeyard	
Michael Jayston	The Sixth Doctor: The Last Adventure	17 August 2015	The Valeyard	
Michael Jayston	Bernice Summerfield: The Story So Far: Volume Two	25 September 2018	The Valeyard	
Michael Jayston	The Eighth Doctor: The Time War: Volume Three	13 August 2019	The Valeyard	
Arabella Weir	"Exile"	September 2003	Alternative Third Doctor	
Nicholas Briggs	"Exile"	September 2003	The previous incarnation of Arabella Weir's Doctor	
Nicholas Briggs	"Seven Keys to Doomsday"	23 October 2008	The Third Doctor	
Nicholas Briggs	The Ninth Doctor Chronicles	May 2017	The Ninth Doctor	
Jon Culshaw	"The Kingmaker"	April 2006	The Fourth Doctor	
Jon Culshaw	"The Threshold"	15 February 2022	The Third Doctor	
Jon Culshaw	The Twelfth Doctor Adventures	Upcoming	The Twelfth Doctor	
Trevor Martin	"Seven Keys to Doomsday"	23 October 2008	Alternative Fourth Doctor	
William Russell	The Lost Stories	November 2010 – September 2013	The First Doctor	
William Russell	The Light at the End	23 October 2013	The First Doctor	
William Russell	The Early Adventures	October 2014 – October 2016	The First Doctor	
Frazer Hines	The Lost Stories	December 2010 – November 2013	The Second Doctor	
Frazer Hines	The Light at the End	23 October 2013	The Second Doctor	
Frazer Hines	The Early Adventures	September 2015 – November 2019	The Second Doctor	
Tim Treloar	The Light at the End	23 October 2013	The Third Doctor	
Tim Treloar	The Third Doctor Adventures	September 2015 – present	The Third Doctor	
Tim Treloar	The Legacy of Time	17 July 2019	The Third Doctor	
Tim Treloar	The Diary of River Song: Series 6	27 August 2019	The Third Doctor (cameo)	
Tim Treloar	Once and Future	May 2023 – October 2023	The Third Doctor	
Tim Treloar	"Deathworld"	16 August 2024	The Third Doctor	
John Banks	"Trial of the Valeyard"	December 2013	The Hermit / The Thirteenth Doctor (a disguise used by the Valeyard)	
Peter Purves	The Early Adventures	December 2014 – August 2021	The First Doctor	
Anthony Howell	"The End of the Line"	August 2015	Tim Hope (a disguise used by the Valeyard)	
Liz White	"The Brink of Death"	August 2015	Genesta (a disguise used by the Valeyard)	
John Hurt	The War Doctor series	December 2015 – February 2017	The War Doctor	
David Bradley	The First Doctor Adventures	December 2017 – April 2021	The First Doctor	
David Bradley	The Legacy of Time	17 July 2019	The First Doctor (cameo)	
David Bradley	The Diary of River Song: Series 6	27 August 2019	The First Doctor (cameo)	
David Bradley	The First Doctor Unbound	September 2025 – present	The First Doctor	
Jacob Dudman	The Doctor Chronicles	April 2018 – March 2024	The Tenth, Eleventh and Twelfth Doctors	
Jacob Dudman	Big Finish Short Trips	May 2020 – February 2022	The Eleventh and Twelfth Doctors	
Jacob Dudman	"The Union"	October 2023	The Eleventh and Twelfth Doctors	
Tom Baker	The Eighth Doctor Adventures: Stranded 1	June 2020	The Curator (implied to be a future version of the Doctor)	
Tom Baker	The Eighth Doctor Adventures: Stranded 2	March 2021	The Curator (implied to be a future version of the Doctor)	
Tom Baker	UNIT: Nemesis: Between Two Worlds	November 2021	The Curator (implied to be a future version of the Doctor)	
Colin Baker	The Eighth Doctor Adventures: Stranded 4	April 2022	The Curator (implied to be a future version of the Doctor)	
Colin Baker	"The Artist at the End of Time"	June 2023	The Curator (implied to be a future version of the Doctor)	
Colin Baker	Doctor of War	13 April 2022 – 27 September 2022	The Doctor of War (Alternative Fifth Doctor)	
Jonathon Carley	The War Doctor Begins	June 2021 – December 2023	The War Doctor	
Jonathon Carley	The War Doctor Rises	August 2024 – present	The War Doctor	
Jonathon Carley	Susan's War: Family Ties	28 August 2024	The War Doctor	
Michael Troughton	The Third Doctor Adventures: The Annihilators	February 2022	The Second Doctor	
Michael Troughton	The Second Doctor Adventures	July 2022 – present	The Second Doctor	
Michael Troughton	Once and Future	May 2023 – October 2023	The Second Doctor	
Michael Troughton	"Deathworld"	16 August 2024	The Second Doctor	
Stephen Noonan	The First Doctor Adventures	12 April 2022 – present	The First Doctor	
Stephen Noonan	Once and Future	May 2023 – October 2023	The First Doctor	
Stephen Noonan	"Deathworld"	16 August 2024	The First Doctor	
Jo Martin	"Coda – The Final Act"	November 2024	The Fugitive Doctor	
Jo Martin	The Fugitive Doctor series	January 2025 – present	The Fugitive Doctor	
Miles Taylor	The Eleventh Doctor Adventures	26 March 2026 – present	The Eleventh Doctor	

=== The Doctor in others' bodies ===
The Doctor in others' bodies
Actor	Title	Dates	Role	Ref.
India Fisher	"Solitaire"	June 2010	The Eighth Doctor speaking through Charley Pollard	
Terry Molloy	"The Curse of Davros"	January 2012	The Sixth Doctor in the body of Davros	
Frazer Hines	"The Jigsaw War"	May 2012	The Second Doctor in Jamie's body	
Melvyn Hayes	"The Scorchies"	7 March 2013	The Third Doctor in Professor Baffle's body	
Damian Lynch	"Ghost in the Machine"	October 2013	The Third Doctor in Benjamin Chikoto's voice	
Katy Manning	"Ghost in the Machine"	October 2013	The Third Doctor in Jo's body	
Katy Manning	"The Key to Many Worlds"	7 May 2025	The Sixth Doctor in Iris Wildthyme's body	
Nicola Bryant	"The Widow's Assassin"	30 October 2014	The Sixth Doctor in Peri's body	
Anneke Wills	"The Crumbling Magician"	18 September 2019	The First Doctor in Polly's body	
Derek Jacobi	The War Master: Hearts of Darkness	October 2020	The Eighth Doctor in The Master's body	

== Other media ==
Other media
Actor	Title	Dates	Role	Medium	Ref.
Peter Cushing	Dr. Who and the Daleks	23 August 1965	Dr. Who	Film	
Peter Cushing	Daleks – Invasion Earth: 2150 A.D.	5 August 1966	Dr. Who	Film	
Trevor Martin	Doctor Who and the Daleks in the Seven Keys to Doomsday	16 December 1974 – 7 January 1975	Alternative Fourth Doctor	Stage play	
Michael Sagar	Doctor Who and the Daleks in the Seven Keys to Doomsday	24 November – 8 December 1984	The Doctor	Stage play	
Lenny Henry	The Lenny Henry Show (S2-E5)	3 October 1985	The Seventh Doctor	Parody	
Jim Broadbent	Victoria Wood: As Seen on TV	18 December 1987	The Doctor	Parody	
David Banks	Doctor Who – The Ultimate Adventure	29 April 1989	The Doctor (one performance)	Stage play	
Rowan Atkinson	The Curse of Fatal Death	12 March 1999	The Doctor	Official parody	
Richard E. Grant	The Curse of Fatal Death	12 March 1999	The Quite Handsome Doctor	Official parody	
Jim Broadbent	The Curse of Fatal Death	12 March 1999	The Shy Doctor	Official parody	
Hugh Grant	The Curse of Fatal Death	12 March 1999	The Handsome Doctor	Official parody	
Joanna Lumley	The Curse of Fatal Death	12 March 1999	The Female Doctor	Official parody	
Mark Gatiss	The Web of Caves	13 November 1999	The Doctor	Official parody	
Richard E. Grant	Scream of the Shalka	13 November – 18 December 2003	A previously official Ninth Doctor prior to the programme's 2005 revival	Webcast	
David Bradley	Doctors Assemble!	23 May 2020	The First Doctor	Webcast	
Chris Walker-Thompson	Doctors Assemble!	23 May 2020	The Second Doctor	Webcast	
Jon Culshaw	Doctors Assemble!	23 May 2020	The Third, Fourth and Fifth Doctors	Webcast	
Angus Villiers-Stuart	Doctors Assemble!	23 May 2020	The Sixth and Eighth Doctors	Webcast	
Wink Taylor	Doctors Assemble!	23 May 2020	The Seventh Doctor	Webcast	
Jonathon Carley	Doctors Assemble!	23 May 2020	The War and Twelfth Doctors	Webcast	
Pete Walsh	Doctors Assemble!	23 May 2020	The Ninth Doctor	Webcast	
Jacob Dudman	Doctors Assemble!	23 May 2020	The Eleventh Doctor	Webcast	
Debra Stephenson	Doctors Assemble!	23 May 2020	The Thirteenth Doctor	Webcast	
Elliott Crossley	Doctors Assemble!	23 May 2020	The Tenth Doctor	Webcast	
Hammed Animashaun	Saturday Night Live UK (S1-E6)	2 May 2026	The Doctor	Parody	

== See also ==
- List of Doctor Who parodies
- List of actors considered for the part of the Doctor
