= The Indestructible Man =

The Indestructible Man may refer to:

- The Indestructible Man (novel), a Doctor Who novel
- Indestructible Man, an American black-and-white second-feature science fiction film starring Lon Chaney, Jr., made in 1956
