= Combat Rock (novel) =

2002 BBC Books Doctor Who novel

- Author: Mick Lewis
- Series: Doctor Who book: Past Doctor Adventures
- Release number: 55
- Subject: Featuring: Second Doctor; Victoria Waterfield and Jamie McCrimmon
- Set in: Period between Dreams of Empire and The Enemy of the World
- Publisher: BBC Books
- Publication date: 2 July 2002
- Pages: 284
- ISBN: 0-563-53855-4
- Preceded by: Ten Little Aliens
- Followed by: The Suns of Caresh

Combat Rock is a BBC Books original novel written by Mick Lewis and based on the long-running British science fiction television series Doctor Who. It features the Second Doctor, Victoria and Jamie.

The story encompasses an extended allegory on Indonesia's colonial treatment of Irian Jaya and draws on Lewis's own experiences in the region. The characters of Jamie and Victoria are also used to explore post-colonial themes.

== Placement ==
Its precise placement in the series continuity is not stated. The Doctor describes landing on a tropical beach as a "welcome change", implying that their last landing was in a more inhospitable place like in the serial The Ice Warriors or the novel Dreams of Empire. However, it could equally fit in between many of the stories with the Second Doctor, Jamie and Victoria, in particular the ending of The Abominable Snowmen.

== Reception ==
In Interzone, Matt Hills writes, "By infusing Doctor Who with the grimmest of sensibilities — Combat Rock includes one character whose favoured leisure pastime is to use, abuse and murder prostitutes — Lewis rewrites a family TV programme that often gestured towards the tropes and stylistic tics of horror as out-and-out horror fiction gesturing in the direction of a family TV show. It is an inversion that doesn't always work, especially as Lewis tries to combine a near "traditional" horror-lite Who plot — mind-altering fungus unleashes primitive behaviour and possesses people — with the exaggerated psychopathologies and gross-out, splatter antics of his mercenary characters."
