= Beautiful Chaos (Russell novel) =

2008 novel by Gary Russell

- Author: Gary Russell
- Series: Doctor Who book: New Series Adventures
- Release number: 29
- Subject: Featuring: Tenth Doctor; Donna Noble; Wilfred Mott; Sylvia Noble
- Set in: Period between "Partners in Crime" and "Turn Left"
- Publisher: BBC Books
- Publication date: 26 December 2008
- ISBN: 1-84607-563-7
- Preceded by: The Story of Martha
- Followed by: The Eyeless

Beautiful Chaos is a BBC Books original novel written by Gary Russell and based on the long running science fiction television series Doctor Who. It features the Tenth Doctor and Donna Noble. It was published on 26 December 2008, alongside The Eyeless and The Story of Martha.

== Continuity ==
- The novel features the return of the Mandragora Helix and is a sequel to the 1976 Fourth Doctor serial The Masque of Mandragora. The Doctor not having had a decent Italian meal "since 1492" is, in itself, a reference to the serial. Reference is also made to the Past Doctor Adventure The Eleventh Tiger, the Doctor Who Magazine comic strip The Mark of Mandragora, and the Big Finish audio drama Sarah Jane Smith: Buried Secrets in which fragments of the Helix previously returned.
- Several references are made to Park Vale, the school which features in The Sarah Jane Adventures. The Tycho Project telescope from The Sarah Jane Adventures serial The Last Sontaran is also mentioned.
- The Doctor says that astrology dates from the "Dark Times", and is shared by every species in the universe. This was also the basis for the Sarah Jane Adventures serial Secrets of the Stars.

== Critical reaction ==
The novel was previewed and later reviewed in Doctor Who Magazine and was well received by critics, leading to one review to call for Russell to be allowed to script an episode of the TV series. The novel was chosen to represent the Tenth Doctor in the special Anniversary reprint set from the BBC in 2013.

== Outside references ==
- The Doctor says he saw the 1969 Moon landing at the Royal Planetary Society, having been invited by "Bernard and Paula". This is a reference to Bernard Quatermass and his daughter. Quatermass is also referred to by Malcolm in "Planet of the Dead" and a Bernard implied to be Quatermass is mentioned by Rachel Jensen in Remembrance of the Daleks.

== Audiobook ==
An abridged audiobook was released on April 9, 2009, read by Bernard Cribbins who played Wilfred Mott in the TV series.

== See also ==
- Whoniverse
