= Warmonger (novel) =

2002 novel by Terrance Dicks

- Author: Terrance Dicks
- Series: Doctor Who book: Past Doctor Adventures
- Release number: 53
- Subject: Featuring: Fifth Doctor; Peri
- Set in: Period between Planet of Fire and The Caves of Androzani
- Publisher: BBC Books
- Publication date: May 2002
- Pages: 288
- ISBN: 0-563-53852-X
- Preceded by: Amorality Tale
- Followed by: Ten Little Aliens

Warmonger is a BBC Books original novel written by Terrance Dicks and based on the long-running British science fiction television series Doctor Who. It features the Fifth Doctor and Peri.

It is a prequel to the television serial The Brain of Morbius from Morbius and Solon and the Sisterhood of the Flame's perspective, although it is technically also a sequel as the Fifth Doctor is the main character while The Brain of Morbius featured the Fourth as the central protagonist. Cardinal Borusa also appears.

== Plot ==
The Doctor and Peri arrive on a small planet, but as soon as Peri steps out, she is attacked by a wild animal and her arm is almost severed. The Doctor takes her in the TARDIS to the hospice on the planet Karn to see the best surgeon in the galaxy, Doctor Mehendri Solon. When they arrive, the hospice's advisor, the Reverend Mother Maren (of the Sisterhood of the Flame) convinces Solon to reattach Peri's arm, which he does successfully.

The head of security, Commander Aylmer Hawken tries to stop the Doctor leaving, but Maren convinces him not to, as she is wary of Time Lords. Lord Delmar, the owner of the hospice also warns Hawken against interfering with the Doctor, in case it stops the peace conference which the hospice is hosting from proceeding. The conference is to make alliances between the smaller empires, and has been set up by a warlord known as "The General".

Solon's assistant Drago starts harassing Peri, and after The Doctor complains, Drago later suggests to Solon that Peri and The Doctor be killed, but Solon dismisses his worries and goes to work on "project Z". overhearing this, Peri follows Drago to a room full of dead bodies made from parts of different species. She leaves the room, but Solon notices Peri's interference and injects her with a poison, but tells The Doctor that her body is rejecting the arm, and she needs the Sisterhood's elixir of life. The Doctor fetches it, but Solon secretly keeps it and gives Peri the antidote. The Doctor then threatens to reveal what Solon just did to Lord Delmar and takes Peri out of the room.

When the ambassadors arrive for the peace conference, Lord Delmar invites the Doctor to watch, but as the Doctor is about to refuse, he recognises the General's mind as that of a Time Lord, and decides to bug the room. Listening in on the meeting, they discover that The General is gathering the small empires into a huge army to take over the galaxy. After his plan to steal the elixir of life fails, the General reveals himself to be Morbius and kidnaps Peri.

Peri escapes Morbius's ship by pretending to have an infectious skin disease, and she is put in an escape pod and launched into space, but a ship from the planet Sylvana finds her and takes her back to Sylvana. Sylvana's nearest planet Freedonia joins Morbius and attacks Sylvana and invades it, causing Peri to join a group of guerrillas.

While Solon continues his experiments, the Doctor goes to Gallifrey to warn the Time Lords about Morbius. The Time Lord President Saran and Borusa refuse to become directly involved, but order the Doctor to unite the largest empires in the galaxy into one army to defeat Morbius. The Doctor then manages to persuade a number of Draconians and Sontarans to join his army. The Time lords send him Ensign Vidal, a Gallifreyan, to act as his advisor, a flagship and the title of Supreme Coordinator of the Alliance. As the campaign grows, Ogrons, Ice Warriors and Cybermen join the Doctor's forces. After Sylvana is recaptured, Peri is reunited with the Doctor.

Eventually Morbius begins defending the area around Karn, which is where the Doctor plans to defeat him finally. The Doctor leads his army into a ground battle, but Maren initially refuses help in defending the elixir of life but eventually accepts. Morbius then withdraws all his troops from the planets they are protecting and brings them to Karn. After the Doctor's forces are nearly destroyed, a second army arrives, comprising foot soldiers from the planets that the Doctor liberated from Morbius. Morbius's army is destroyed, he is captured, tried and sentenced to death. The survivors of the Doctor's army return to their home planets while Morbius is imprisoned awaiting execution.

Solon unleashes his zombies on Saran and Borusa, but they easily overpower them, and Solon is imprisoned. To avoid a paradox, the Doctor goes to free Solon from his cell, but finds one of Morbius's commanders has already done so, following them to the execution room, he finds Solon removing Morbius's brain. After Solon leaves, the Doctor puts Morbius's body in the vaporisation chamber, and waits for Saran and Borusa to arrive. They then vaporise Morbius's body. The Doctor quietly leaves with Peri. The hospice is abandoned, the Sisterhood retreat to their temple and Solon resumes his experiments until, years later, the Fourth Doctor and Sarah Jane Smith arrive on Karn.

== Notes ==
- Peri quotes from The Hitchhiker's Guide to the Galaxy by Douglas Adams. Adams was script editor on Doctor Who in 1979 and wrote three stories for the programme, The Pirate Planet, City of Death and the uncompleted Shada.

== Reception ==
Warmonger won Worst Book in the 2002 Jade Pagoda Awards.
