= Instruments of Darkness =

2001 novel by Gary Russell

- Author: Gary Russell
- Series: Doctor Who book: Past Doctor Adventures
- Release number: 48
- Subject: Featuring: Sixth Doctor; Mel and Evelyn Smythe.
- Set in: Period between The Trial of a Time Lord and Time and the Rani
- Publisher: BBC Books
- Publication date: November 2001
- Pages: 287
- ISBN: 0-563-53828-7
- Preceded by: Dying in the Sun
- Followed by: Relative Dementias

Instruments of Darkness is a BBC Books original novel written by Gary Russell and based on the long-running British science fiction television series Doctor Who. It features the Sixth Doctor and Mel.

This novel concludes a trilogy concerning the Pale Man and the Irish Twins which began in Russell's The Scales of Injustice and Business Unusual. Evelyn Smythe, the Sixth Doctor's companion from the Big Finish Productions audio plays, also appears.
