= The Eleventh Tiger =

2004 novel by David A. McIntee

- Author: David A. McIntee
- Series: Doctor Who book: Past Doctor Adventures
- Release number: 66
- Subject: Featuring: First Doctor; Ian, Barbara, and Vicki
- Set in: Period between Byzantium! and The Web Planet
- Publisher: BBC Books
- Publication date: May 2004
- Pages: 287
- ISBN: 0-563-48614-7
- Preceded by: Empire of Death
- Followed by: Synthespians™

The Eleventh Tiger is a BBC Books original novel written by David A. McIntee and based on the long-running British science fiction television series Doctor Who. It features the First Doctor, Ian, Barbara, and Vicki.

== Synopsis ==
It is China in 1865. Strife and rebellion rock the land. Trying to maintain order is the British Empire and the martial arts expert, the Ten Tigers of Canton. Adding to the confusion is the impossibility of many people already knowing Ian.

== Continuity ==
Although it is never expressly identified, various clues suggest that the energy being the Doctor and his allies faced here was the Mandragora Helix, which fought the Fourth Doctor in the fifteenth century in The Masque of Mandragora; the Tenth Doctor confirmed its presence here when he faced Mandragora again in the New Series Adventures novel Beautiful Chaos.
