= The Time Travellers =

2005 novel by Simon Guerrier

- Author: Simon Guerrier
- Series: Doctor Who book: Past Doctor Adventures
- Release number: 75
- Subject: Featuring: First Doctor; Ian, Barbara and Susan
- Set in: Period between Planet of Giants and The Dalek Invasion of Earth
- Publisher: BBC Books
- Publication date: November 2005
- Pages: 284
- ISBN: 0-563-48633-3
- Preceded by: World Game
- Followed by: Atom Bomb Blues

The Time Travellers is a BBC Books original novel written by Simon Guerrier. It is based on the long-running British science fiction television series Doctor Who, and features the First Doctor, his Granddaughter Susan Foreman, and her two Coal Hill School teachers Barbara Wright and Ian Chesterton.
