= Fear of the Dark (novel) =

2003 novel by Trevor Baxendale

- Author: Trevor Baxendale
- Series: Doctor Who book: Past Doctor Adventures
- Release number: 58
- Subject: Featuring: Fifth Doctor; Tegan and Nyssa
- Set in: Period after Arc of Infinity
- Publisher: BBC Books
- Publication date: March 2003
- Pages: 275
- ISBN: 0563538651
- Preceded by: Heritage
- Followed by: Blue Box

Fear of the Dark is a BBC Books original novel written by Trevor Baxendale and based on the long-running British science fiction television series Doctor Who. It features the Fifth Doctor, Tegan and Nyssa.

Fear of the Dark was re-released in 2013 for the 50th Anniversary of Doctor Who.

== Synopsis ==
It is 2382. Archaeologists land on Akoshemon's only moon, along with the Doctor and his companions Nyssa and Tegan (who arrived in the TARDIS by a strange coincidence). They uncover an entity that was seemingly there when Akoshemon destroyed itself in violence; it glories in death and destruction and tries to start more. It seems to have the ability to mentally influence people.

== Reception ==
Fear of the Dark was positively reviewed in the Guardian where it was described as "one of the scariest books I've read."
