= World Game (novel) =

2005 BBC Books Doctor Who novel

- Author: Terrance Dicks
- Series: Doctor Who book: Past Doctor Adventures
- Release number: 74
- Subject: Featuring: Second Doctor the Lady Serena
- Set in: Period between The War Games and The Two Doctors (in the Second Doctor's timeline)
- Publisher: BBC Books
- Publication date: 6 October 2005
- Pages: 285
- ISBN: 0-563-48636-8
- Preceded by: Fear Itself
- Followed by: The Time Travellers

World Game is a BBC Books original novel written by Terrance Dicks and based on the long-running British science fiction television series Doctor Who. It features the Second Doctor (Patrick Troughton) and the Lady Serena and is set during "Season 6B". It is also a partial sequel to another Dicks' Past Doctor Adventure, Players and documents the return of the Countess. The novel makes reference to the events of Sharpe's Triumph by Bernard Cornwell.

== Plot ==
Under threat of execution after his conviction by the Time Lords at the end of The War Games, the Doctor is granted a reprieve if he agrees to undertake missions for the Celestial Intervention Agency. Accompanied and supervised by the ambitious Lady Serena, their first mission is to halt attacks upon three key figures in Earth's past: Napoleon Bonaparte, The Duke of Wellington, and Charles Maurice de Talleyrand.

The Doctor re-encounters the Player known as the Countess and struggles to end her Grand Plan to allow Napoleon to win his various European campaigns. Her plan to set the City States of Europe against each other is stopped by the Doctor, despite her setting a Raston Warrior Robot and a vampire on him and Serena. In preventing the Countess's assassination scheme on Wellington, Serena is killed. The Countess has many back up plans, and at the Battle of Waterloo, her plan to prevent the Prussians coming to the English army's relief is thwarted when the Doctor imitates Napoleon himself to get through the French lines and deliver new orders to the Prussian commander Gebhard Leberecht von Blücher.

After returning to Gallifrey and discovering a traitor in the CIA who had been using the time scoop to assist the Countess, the Doctor is sent on a mission to investigate the time travel experiments of Kartz and Reimer.

== Continuity ==
- The events of the book lead directly into The Two Doctors for the Second Doctor. He is also given the Stattenheim Remote Control.
- Psychic paper, introduced by Russell T Davies in the 2005 series of Doctor Who, is used here by the Second Doctor and Lady Serena, as a "new CIA invention". The text implies that the card in question is the same one later used by the Ninth, Tenth, Eleventh, Twelfth, Thirteenth and War Doctors, though the connection is never explicitly stated.
- The Sixth Doctor also participates in the Battle of Waterloo in the audio The Curse of Davros when he has to prevent Davros and the Daleks from altering the outcome of the battle. However, the two perspectives can be reconciled as the Sixth Doctor spends more time interacting with Napoleon in the battle, while the Second was helping the Duke of Wellington.

== Notes ==
- Due to a printing error, the Doctor Who logo is missing from the spine of the book.
