= The Story of Martha =

2008 novel by Dan Abnett

- Author: Dan Abnett (main writer); With; David Roden; Steve Lockley & Paul Lewis; Robert Shearman; Simon Jowett
- Series: Doctor Who book: New Series Adventures
- Release number: 28
- Subject: Featuring: Tenth Doctor; Martha Jones
- Set in: Period between "The Sound of Drums" and "Last of the Time Lords"
- Publisher: BBC Books
- Publication date: 26 December 2008
- ISBN: 1-84607-561-0
- Preceded by: Shining Darkness
- Followed by: Beautiful Chaos

The Story of Martha is a BBC Books anthology with a framing device written by Dan Abnett. David Roden, Steve Lockley and Paul Lewis, Robert Shearman and Simon Jowett write the stories presented. It features the Tenth Doctor and Martha Jones. It was published on 26 December 2008, at the same time as Beautiful Chaos and The Eyeless. It takes place between "The Sound of Drums" and "Last of the Time Lords" and details Martha's journey around the world during the Master's reign over Earth.

== Synopsis ==
As Martha travels, she meets survivors of the Master's domination of Earth. Martha relates stories conveying a message of hope that she and the Doctor can defeat the Master, foreshadowing the events of "Last of the Time Lords". The story ends at the point at which that episode begins.

=== "The Weeping" by David Roden ===
This story is told to a little girl. It relates the Doctor and Martha's journey to a planet called Agelaos, after receiving a warning signal. As the population lived near a wormhole, they developed a degree of psychic ability. The Doctor and Martha meet an old man named Waechter, who saves them from an unknown beast and leads them to safety. It's revealed that Waechter is the guardian of the Beacon on the planet, the only person left on Agelaos. He is being kept alive by a circuit wired into his neck. He is also revealed to retain a psychic ability himself, shown when the Doctor's psychic paper and his mind clash. The Doctor agrees to take Waechter away with them on the TARDIS, and transport him to another planet; when suddenly he begins to die on board as Waechter's link to Agelaos is still transmitting through the chip in his neck.

After an inspection of the chip, the Doctor comes to the realisation that the population of Agelaos hasn't disappeared; but merely evolved into the creatures from who they were trying to evade in the beginning. The chip was just holding Waechter's humanity in balance. The Doctor provides Waechter with the choice of destruction of the chip and transformation into the alien creature, or leaving the chip and living alone on Agelaos as a human. After seeing his future in the psychic paper, Waechter decides to become one of the alien creatures as a way of never being lonely again. After imparting his thanks and some final psychic predictions to Martha and the Doctor, Waechter leaves the TARDIS to be with his people; as the Doctor and Martha set off on another adventure.

=== "Breathing Space" by Steve Lockley and Paul Lewis ===
The story is told to a group of people in a survivor camp in France. After spending time on a resort planet, the Doctor and Martha are once again pulled to a location after the TARDIS intercepts a 'whale song'. They arrive on a space station in 2088, looking over the Earth and also strange-looking signals. They meet Professor Conrad Morris; of whom the Doctor seems to be a big fan. Introducing themselves as John Smith and Dr. Martha Jones, they are told about the Benefactors; a solitary race, supposedly the salvation of mankind. They sent a broadcast to the people of Earth, offering salvation from global meltdown from the effects of global warming and atmospheric pollution. The Doctor immediately recognises the Benefactors as an alien race called the Cineraria; who steal planets and proceed to wipe out all lifeforms and resources in existence. However, Morris and the Head of Security, Daniel Grant; refuse to believe the Doctor's warnings. After escaping from Grant and his guards, the Doctor sends Martha to run and lead them away from the TARDIS as to give him more time to fix the problem with the Cineraria.

Grant however, catches up with Martha and forces her back into the control centre, where the Doctor suddenly appears from the TARDIS on the centre's monitors. He explains that the 'whale song' is actual a group of encoded signals which are transmitted between each of the signals outside as way of updating the Cineraria of gas levels stored. Using the sonic screwdriver, the control centre begins to drop towards the Earth as the creatures on the outside take a protective position around it. Appearing in the control centre, the Doctor and Martha notice that the creatures prepare to kill the population of Earth below. The Doctor states that it could all end if Professor Morris asked the Cineraria to stop. They'd have admitted defeat in this sense because they act on stealth; and the Doctor had uncovered their plot.

As the Cineraria depart, the Doctor reveals to Professor Morris that he believes that the human race is amazing in itself and they can fix their own problems without the help of an alien race. Inside the TARDIS, Martha asks the Doctor to take her to Earth, ten years in the future; so she can see how the world has managed to sort itself out. The Doctor reassures her that everything will be brilliant and they depart.

=== "The Frozen Wastes" by Robert Shearman ===
Martha has been captured and sent to a labour camp in Japan. This story tells how Martha had always wanted to be a doctor since she was a child, after becoming fascinated with her bones' healing process after she broke her arm. The tale then goes onto detail an adventure wherein the Doctor and Martha join a French Arctic Expeditionist named Pierre Bruyere in 1890, on his maiden voyage. Pierre had planned to fly a hot air balloon to the North Pole as a way of fulfilling a childhood dream. As Pierre spoke to the Geographical Congress, the Doctor explains to Martha that Pierre disappeared after he took off in April 1890. Martha remarks that they are in June 1890, to which the Doctor replies that Pierre doesn't seem to know he is a dead man.

The Doctor, Martha and Pierre set off in the balloon successfully; with the Doctor remarking on Pierre's brilliance along the way. Martha recalls the happiest times of the expedition which were when the trio would come together as team and sing songs. As Martha slept, she dreamed of being a Doctor once more; and hearing a voice coming through when she was sitting her exam. She is shaken awake by the Doctor to find the balloon is losing height; and the team begin to throw their luggage out to lighten the load. Averting disaster, Martha found herself dreaming of her medical exam again; the voice asking for details about her bones. The three would share their dreams, the Doctor becoming interested when Pierre mentions he dreams of nothing but white. The Doctor denies that he dreams anything; however he tells Martha that he dreams about the unknown and the dangers of it.

When Pierre awakes, he states that they have reached the North Pole as they have been travelling constantly for about five months. Martha believes it to have been only a fortnight, and the Doctor reveals that they have in fact been travelling for years because they were frozen in time. Using the sonic screwdriver, the Doctor causes the balloon to pop; only to reveal to Martha and Pierre that they were being suspended in mid air. The Doctor explains that Pierre had been caught in a time loop as a result of his journal; sending him back to redo the expedition again and again, always doomed. Pierre becomes disturbed by the revelation when he sees one of his many counterparts alongside his own. Draining the life of his counterpart by holding his face; the Doctor realises that Pierre has been overcome and forces him to do the same to him, thinking that the vast amount of knowledge he retains will weaken Pierre. The Doctor was mistaken, as Pierre's hunger was too insatiable; and he cries out for Martha. She does the same thing and holds the Doctor's face to give him warmth, which unfreezes time to leave the two alone, holding each other.

On board the TARDIS, The Doctor remarks that they never did get to the North Pole; and he takes Martha there to be the first human to set foot in the region. Then covering her tracks as to not interrupt history, the Doctor takes Martha to the North Pole, 200 years in the future; where the region had an interactive museum. He tells her of his dreams; that when he was a child, the Doctor had wanted to be an explorer. But he knew it could not be because his people had already discovered everything. They advised him not to leave Gallifrey as there was no point, but the Doctor found one; and whenever he'd dream, he'd see it.

=== "Star-Crossed" by Simon Jowett ===
The tale picks up at the labour camp. In the story, the Doctor and Martha discover a room full of empty cryogenic units. The Doctor concludes that they are a ship full of frozen colonists. They will thaw and awake when they reach the target planet. And, as the ship they are on has yet to reach its target, the cargo should still be dormant. This flashback is revealed to be a part of Martha's memories, as things begin to happen which she knows did not occur first time around. Martha regains consciousness, revealing the flashback to have been a dream-memory, and comes face to face with a young woman and Breed. They are not alone. The room is paced with other people, all wearing Breed's face.

Elsewhere, the Doctor meets the Head of the Steering Council, Treve; who along with another group, had been hunting Breed. It is revealed that Treve and Laine, the leader of the smaller group, had been frozen themselves; and had been awake for two years. Breed was classed as an Artificial, genetic clones made to perform maintenance checks and to deal with emergencies. Treve states that Breed and the other Artificials have changed their designations and given themselves human names. Breed now calls himself Edison. Becoming individuals themselves, the Breeds had developed beyond their original function.

Meanwhile, Martha discovers that the Steering Council want Edison dead because he fell in love with the young woman, Romea. Romea states that Edison didn't mean any harm but the Artificials were stronger than the humans. Edison and Romea had broken the rules by fraternising together and so they were both on the run. A fight breaks out between the Artificials and the Colonists as Martha tries to reach the Fabricator, which would provide everything needed to colonise the target world. As the fight continues, Martha is thrown against a wall after being caught in a collision between a Colonist and an Artificial. As Romea runs to her aid, she is held back and a Colonist approaches Martha with a large spanner. An Artificial protects her and Martha screams out for the fighting to stop.

The Doctor arrives and orders the same thing and the fighting stops when he takes order of the ship. The Doctor reveals that he'd seen the Pilot's log and discovered that the Artificials were linked to the Pilot System. They'd be created when there was a problem; for instance the cyro-system failure which had apparently killed half the Colonists. The Doctor remarks that ALL of the Colonists were killed, meaning that everyone bar them on the ship was in fact an Artificial. Around them, the Artificials slowly comfort each other to Martha's amazement. The Doctor tells her that everyone is an Artificial now, but love is real.

After providing the ship with enough energy, Martha asks what the Doctor had done in the corridor when he'd been confusing the armed men. The Doctor remarks that he was using Amtorian jiu-jitsu, revealing that he'd never taken his final rank grading; and that it can take place at any moment. Upon hearing a noise, Martha asks if he's told the Amtorians he wasn't going to take the grading to which the Doctor urgently assures her before pushing her into the TARDIS, and setting off.

== Audiobook ==
An abridged audiobook, without the four short stories, was released on 4 June 2009. It was read by Freema Agyeman (Martha Jones in the series). The four short stories, also read by her, were released for download-only (and making it an unabridged story). In August 2018 the previous audiobook and the four short stories were released together on CD for the first time as part of the CD box set Tenth Doctor Novels Volume 3.

== See also ==
- Whoniverse
