= The Suns of Caresh =

2002 novel by Paul Saint

- Author: Paul Saint
- Series: Doctor Who book: Past Doctor Adventures
- Release number: 56
- Subject: Featuring: Third Doctor; Jo
- Set in: Period between Carnival of Monsters and Frontier in Space
- Publisher: BBC Books
- Publication date: August 2002
- Pages: 283
- ISBN: 0-563-53858-9
- Preceded by: Combat Rock
- Followed by: Heritage

The Suns of Caresh is a BBC Books original novel written by Paul Saint (a pseudonym) and based on the long-running British science fiction television series Doctor Who. It features the Third Doctor and Jo.

SFX Magazine writer David Langford had suggested the identity of Paul Saint to be that of veteran Doctor Who author and fellow SFX writer Paul Cornell, but this was denied by Cornell himself. The author is, in fact, Paul Beardsley.

== Reception ==
In Interzone, Matt Hills writes, "The level of inventiveness on show in The Suns of Caresh is consistently stunning, down to little asides like a comment on the prevalence of emergency regeneration in Time Lord drama, and details like Saint's repeated use of the number 18. Making one character a science-fiction fan is also a worthwhile device which never threatens to become too self-referential, even if the character concerned is ultimately dealt with authorially in an overly terse and unfeeling way." The Suns of Caresh was also noted in the Ben Goldacre column Bad Science, following a reader recommendation of the book because "In one scene the Tardis's destination is unexpectedly diverted from Israel to Chichester. Since the settings had not been adjusted to take into account the different rotational speed of the Earth's surface at this latitude, the Tardis leaves a wake of destruction across the English countryside."
