= Spiral Scratch (novel) =

2005 novel by Gary Russell

- Author: Gary Russell
- Series: Doctor Who book: Past Doctor Adventures
- Release number: 72
- Subject: Featuring: Sixth Doctor; Mel
- Set in: Period immediately before Time and the Rani
- Publisher: BBC Books
- Publication date: 4 August 2005
- Pages: 281
- ISBN: 0-563-48626-0
- Preceded by: Island of Death
- Followed by: Fear Itself

Spiral Scratch is a BBC Books original novel written by Gary Russell and based on the long-running British science fiction television series Doctor Who. It features the Sixth Doctor and Mel. The debut adventure of the Seventh Doctor, Time and the Rani, begins with the Doctor regenerating with little explanation given; Russell's novel attempts to provide a "final story" for the Sixth Doctor and effectively serves as a prequel to Time and the Rani.

== Continuity ==
- The end of the novel suggests another explanation for the Doctor's regeneration into his seventh incarnation rather than the crash landing seen at the start of Time and the Rani, with the Doctor being forced to sacrifice much of his energy to stop a pan-dimensional being from destroying creation, thus leaving him in a weakened condition prior to the Rani's attack; rather than injuries sustained by the Rani's attack causing the regeneration, he was already dying and the Rani's attack simply finished the job. There is also a reference to the Sixth Doctor meeting a future version of himself in the TARDIS, although which incarnation is not specified. Russell also includes further suggestions that the BBC books range and the Big Finish Productions audio range take place in parallel universes, and even has brief appearances from Peri, Evelyn Smythe, the Cyber-enhanced Evelyn from Real Time and Frobisher, as well as an alternate version of Mel who is a half-Silurian hybrid.
- The unofficial novel Time's Champion, written by Chris McKeon based on notes by the late Craig Hinton, implies that the Doctor's endeavour there is a new timeline created by the Sixth Doctor in his first act as "Time's Champion" as he attempts to save Mel from the clutches of Death, who would become a frequent nemesis to the Seventh Doctor in the Virgin New Adventures novels.

== Notes ==
- The novel was originally titled Future Nostalgia.
- The title of the book is taken from the record of the same name by Buzzcocks.
- On the cover, the Doctor is wearing his blue cravat, but at the time of his regeneration he wore a red cravat.
