= Players (Dicks novel) =

1999 novel by Terrance Dicks

- Author: Terrance Dicks
- Series: Doctor Who book: Past Doctor Adventures
- Release number: 21
- Subject: Featuring: Sixth Doctor, Second Doctor; Peri
- Publisher: BBC Books
- Publication date: 26 April 1999
- Pages: 251
- ISBN: 0-563-55573-4
- Preceded by: Deep Blue
- Followed by: Millennium Shock

Players is a BBC Books original novel written by Terrance Dicks and based on the long-running British science fiction television series Doctor Who. It features the Sixth Doctor and Peri meeting Winston Churchill during the Boer War and prior to the abdication of the would-be king Edward VIII. Flashbacks scenes feature the Second Doctor meeting Winston Churchill in 1915 during the First World War, these sequences serving as a partial prologue to Dick's subsequent novel World Game, which is set during Season 6B.
