= Ten Little Aliens =

2002 novel by Stephen Cole

- Author: Stephen Cole
- Series: Doctor Who book: Past Doctor Adventures
- Release number: 54
- Subject: Featuring: First Doctor; Ben and Polly
- Set in: Period between The Smugglers and The Tenth Planet
- Publisher: BBC Books
- Publication date: June 2002
- Pages: 281
- ISBN: 0-563-53853-8
- Preceded by: Warmonger
- Followed by: Combat Rock

Ten Little Aliens is a BBC Books original novel written by Stephen Cole and based on the long-running British science fiction television series Doctor Who. It features the First Doctor, Ben and Polly.

Ten Little Aliens was re-released in 2013 for the 50th Anniversary of Doctor Who.

== Reception ==
In Interzone, Matt Hills writes, "The novel's major premise is sharply executed: the corpses of "most wanted" alien terrorists mysteriously return to life in order to attack an elite military squad sent to hunt them down. [...] Cole's plotting is strong, and the novel also hits home via its quirky stylistic choices: introducing military characters very economically through their comments on the Schirr enemy, and pausing for a "Make Your Own Adventure"-style interlude where one has to navigate through the different viewpoints of a neural network."
