= The Algebra of Ice =

2004 novel by Lloyd Rose

- Author: Lloyd Rose
- Series: Doctor Who book: Past Doctor Adventures
- Release number: 68
- Subject: Featuring: Seventh Doctor; Ace
- Set in: Period between Loving the Alien and Atom Bomb Blues
- Publisher: BBC Books
- Publication date: September 2004
- Pages: 279
- ISBN: 0-563-48621-X
- Preceded by: Synthespians™
- Followed by: The Indestructible Man

The Algebra of Ice is a BBC Books original novel written by Lloyd Rose and based on the long-running British science fiction television series Doctor Who. It features the Seventh Doctor and Ace.

== Synopsis ==
The Doctor and Ace investigate a 'crop circle' in the Kentish countryside; they are helped by a maths expert, a web-magazine publish and the Doctor's friend, the Brigadier. However, this crop circle is made of ice and is not circular, instead being filled with square-sided shapes. It draws the Doctor and Ace into a new level of reality.

== Trivia ==
The story makes reference to the Riemann hypothesis, featuring a sequence set in a 'world' modelled on the Riemann zeta function.
