= The Eyeless =

2008 novel by Lance Parkin

- Author: Lance Parkin
- Series: Doctor Who book: New Series Adventures
- Release number: 30
- Subject: Featuring: Tenth Doctor
- Publisher: BBC Books
- Publication date: 26 December 2008
- ISBN: 1-84607-562-9
- Preceded by: Beautiful Chaos
- Followed by: Judgement of the Judoon

The Eyeless is a BBC Books original novel written by Lance Parkin and based on the long-running science fiction television series Doctor Who. It features the Tenth Doctor. It was published in December 2008, alongside Beautiful Chaos and The Story of Martha. This is the first of the New Series Adventures to feature the Doctor without any companions.

== Plot ==
The Doctor, now on his own, is drawn to the ruins an ancient weapon at the heart of a destroyed civilisation. There he discovers survivors from the world before, people who were children when the weapon fell out of the sky and destroyed the great city, now adults heading a small tribe with offspring of their own. The tribe rests far beyond the city, away from the dangers of the decayed buildings and the ghosts of those who once lived in them. But there are new dangers arising. A race of glass conquerors calling themselves 'The Eyeless' have also been drawn to the ruins by the ancient power of the weapon, and the Doctor must venture deep into the centre of it to uncover why it suddenly appeared, and why it destroyed everything...

== See also ==
- Whoniverse
