= The Indestructible Man (novel) =

2004 novel by Simon Messingham

- Front cover
- Author: Simon Messingham
- Series: Past Doctor Adventures
- Release number: 69
- Publication date: November 2004
- Pages: 283
- ISBN: 0-563-48623-6
- Preceded by: The Algebra of Ice
- Followed by: Match of the Day

The Indestructible Man is a BBC Books novel written by Simon Messingham and based on the British science fiction television series Doctor Who. The novel features the Second Doctor, Jamie and Zoe.

Set mostly in 2096, with a prologue in 2068, the novel depicts a future in which Earth is under attack from the Myloki, aliens from the Moon. This fictional world is modelled on TV series created by Gerry Anderson, in particular Stingray, Thunderbirds, Captain Scarlet and the Mysterons and UFO. However, the novel presents a dystopian future in contrast with the more utopian style of Anderson's work.

== Writing ==
According to Messingham, The Indestructible Man was "structurally [...] planned as a Gothic novel, in that events of the past haunt the characters in the present and impose themselves physically on their lives. The Myloki symbolised the internal psyches of the protagonists." He said that his first draft of the novel came to almost 110,000 words.

== Reception ==
The novel has received mixed reviews. Mark Campbell, author of Robinson's Doctor Who: The Complete Guide, rates it 8 out of 10. Richard McGinlay of sci-fi-online.com calls it "an intriguing book, but sadly not tremendously riveting. The narrative reads like a sequence of events that are not strung together very tightly by the slender plot. Still, it should help you to destroy a few long winter evenings, especially if you're an Anderson fan."

In a review for Doctor Who Magazine, Matt Michael wrote that The Indestructible Man is "every bit as steeped in Anderson lore (sometimes impenetrably so) as [its] cover suggests". He commented that although the novel begins well, Zoe's subplot is thinly written and the story's "energy and focus" drop during the scenes set on SKYHOME. While he found the Myloki memorable for being "truly unknowable" villains, he criticised the abundance of "charmless expository dialogue", combined with "camp" and eventually "grating" Anderson references ill fitting the sobriety of the plot. He concluded: "Epic in scope, fast paced and never boring, but undermined by some poor jokes and occasionally crass execution, The Indestructible Man is perhaps more of a Terrahawks than a Captain Scarlet." Doctor Who Magazine readers gave the novel an average score of 6.95 out of 10.

Chris Bentley, who has authored books on the Anderson productions, writes that Messingham "[pulls] off the difficult trick of combining the format of Gerry Anderson's [...] series with that of Doctor Who's 1968 season to present a gripping, action-packed and thoughtful story which transcended all expectations of such a 'novelty' crossover." He adds that the story contains "serious examination" of the "physical and emotional deterioration" that an interplanetary conflict might cause. According to Bentley, the novel was "largely dismissed by reviewers in the Doctor Who camp, who found the Anderson references intrusive."
