= Blue Box (novel) =

2003 novel by Kate Orman

- Author: Kate Orman
- Series: Doctor Who book: Past Doctor Adventures
- Release number: 59
- Subject: Featuring: Sixth Doctor; Peri
- Set in: Period after The Two Doctors
- Publisher: BBC Books
- Publication date: March 2003
- Pages: 269
- ISBN: 0-563-53859-7
- Preceded by: Fear of the Dark
- Followed by: Loving the Alien

Blue Box is a BBC Books original novel written by Kate Orman and based on the long-running British science fiction television series Doctor Who. It features the Sixth Doctor and Peri, written from a first-person perspective by a fictional journalist, in a similar manner to Who Killed Kennedy by David Bishop. The character Ian Mond is named after a well-known fan who is a member of various internet forums including Jade Pagoda and the Outpost Gallifrey forums.

The title of this novel does not refer to the TARDIS, but to the blue box used by phreakers, and by analogy, the alien hacking tool that is the book's MacGuffin.
