= Past Doctor Adventures =

Series of Doctor Who-based novels (1997–2005)

The Past Doctor Adventures (sometimes known by the abbreviation PDA or PDAs) were a series of spin-off novels based on the long running BBC science fiction television series Doctor Who and published under the BBC Books imprint. For most of their existence, they were published side-by-side with the Eighth Doctor Adventures. The novels regularly featured the First through Seventh Doctors. The Infinity Doctors had an ambiguous place in continuity and featured an unidentified incarnation of the Doctor. The Eighth Doctor co-starred with the Fourth Doctor in one novel (Wolfsbane) and, after the Eighth Doctor Adventures had ceased publication, a novel (Fear Itself) featuring the Eighth Doctor and set between two earlier Eighth Doctor Adventures (EarthWorld and Vanishing Point) was published within the Past Doctor series.

== Publication history ==
Between 1991 and 1997, Virgin Publishing produced successful spin-off novels under the New Adventures and Missing Adventures ranges. However, following the Doctor Who television movie in 1996, the BBC did not renew Virgin Publishing's license to continue publishing Doctor Who material. Instead, they opted to publish their own range beginning in 1997 with The Devil Goblins from Neptune by Martin Day and Keith Topping. The range continued to be published through to 2005.

Virgin had distinguished the New and Missing Adventures with different cover designs. BBC Books, however, did not differentiate their novels featuring the current and past Doctors in this way, although they were listed separately within the books. Fans, however, continued to distinguish the ongoing story of the Eighth Doctor from the more stand-alone adventures of past Doctors.

Despite moving to the BBC, the writers (many of whom wrote for the Virgin series) have broadly attempted to maintain continuity with the New and Missing Adventures and many elements from these series have appeared in the Past Doctor Adventures (which replaced the Missing Adventures). Indeed, one of the novels — Millennium Shock by Justin Richards — was a direct sequel to System Shock, a Missing Adventure published by Virgin. Another notable release was Scream of the Shalka, a novelisation of the webcast of the same title and the only release in the Past Doctor range that did not feature an "official" incarnation of the Doctor. The Infinity Doctors, written by Lance Parkin, featured an unidentified Doctor.

In addition to the Past Doctor Adventures and the Eighth Doctor Adventures, the BBC also published three short story collections under the title of Short Trips, which feature all eight (at the time of publication) Doctors. These were also inherited from Virgin, a version of their Decalog short story collections, and when the BBC ceased publishing them, a licence to continue was sought by Big Finish Productions, who continued to publish their own range of Short Trips collections until 2009.

The range has ceased publication. In the spring of 2005, BBC Books began publishing a series of hardcover books, the New Series Adventures. The BBC Past Doctor paperback series continued for the remainder of 2005, but no titles were announced after Andrew Cartmel's Atom Bomb Blues, which was released in November 2005. In a talk in July 2006, commissioning editor Justin Richards said that BBC Books have plans for the future of the Past Doctor Adventures, but that decisions had not yet been taken. Beginning in 2012, hardback books featuring past Doctors are being published, with longer books and in a larger format, though at a much reduced rate compared with the pre-2005 output.

== List ==
Including books featuring two of the Doctors, the numbers of books each appears in are as follows:

- First Doctor, 8 books
- Second Doctor, 12 books
- Third Doctor, 12 books
- Fourth Doctor, 13 books
- Fifth Doctor, 10 books
- Sixth Doctor, 11 books
- Seventh Doctor, 13 books
- Eighth Doctor, 2 books

#	Title	Author(s)	Doctor	Featuring	Published	Notes
1	The Devil Goblins from Neptune	Martin Day and Keith Topping	3rd	Liz Shaw, UNIT	June 1997	
2	The Murder Game	Steve Lyons	2nd	Ben and Polly	July 1997	
3	The Ultimate Treasure	Christopher Bulis	5th	Peri	August 1997	
4	Business Unusual	Gary Russell	6th	Mel and The Brigadier	September 1997	
5	Illegal Alien	Mike Tucker and Robert Perry	7th	Ace	October 1997	
6	The Roundheads	Mark Gatiss	2nd	Ben, Polly and Jamie	November 1997	
7	The Face of the Enemy	David A. McIntee	3rd	The Master, UNIT, The Brigadier, Ian, Barbara, and Harry	January 1998	
8	Eye of Heaven	Jim Mortimore	4th	Leela	February 1998	
9	The Witch Hunters	Steve Lyons	1st	Susan, Ian and Barbara	March 1998	
10	The Hollow Men	Martin Day and Keith Topping	7th	Ace	6 April 1998	
11	Catastrophea	Terrance Dicks	3rd	Jo	May 1998	
12	Mission: Impractical	David A. McIntee	6th	Frobisher	June 1998	
13	Zeta Major	Simon Messingham	5th	Tegan and Nyssa	July 1998	
14	Dreams of Empire	Justin Richards	2nd	Jamie and Victoria	August 1998	
15	Last Man Running	Chris Boucher	4th	Leela	September 1998	
16	Matrix	Mike Tucker and Robert Perry	7th	Ace	October 1998	
17	The Infinity Doctors	Lance Parkin	Unspecified	None	November 1998	
18	Salvation	Steve Lyons	1st	Steven and Dodo	January 1999	
19	The Wages of Sin	David A. McIntee	3rd	Jo and Liz	February 1999	
20	Deep Blue	Mark Morris	5th	Tegan, Turlough and UNIT	March 1999	
21	Players	Terrance Dicks	6th and 2nd^{1}	Peri	April 1999	
22	Millennium Shock	Justin Richards	4th	Harry	May 1999	
23	Storm Harvest	Mike Tucker and Robert Perry	7th	Ace	June 1999	
24	The Final Sanction	Steve Lyons	2nd	Jamie and Zoe	July 1999	
25	City at World's End	Christopher Bulis	1st	Ian, Barbara and Susan	September 1999	
26	Divided Loyalties	Gary Russell	5th	Adric, Nyssa and Tegan, the Celestial Toymaker	October 1999	The book is divided into four rounds, each named after the title of an Orchestral Manoeuvres in the Dark song, as well as all the chapters within each round. According to E.G. Wolverson of Doctor Who Reviews, many critiqued the portrayal of the Doctor's childhood on Gallifrey in the extended flashback. They state that they and Chadd Knueppe of Outpost Gallifrey are the only ones who enjoyed it.
27	Corpse Marker	Chris Boucher	4th	Leela	November 1999	
28	Last of the Gaderene	Mark Gatiss	3rd	Jo and UNIT	January 2000	
29	Tomb of Valdemar	Simon Messingham	4th	Romana I and K-9	February 2000	
30	Verdigris	Paul Magrs	3rd	Jo	3 April 2000	
31	Grave Matter	Justin Richards	6th	Peri	May 2000	
32	Heart of TARDIS	Dave Stone	2nd and 4th^{2}	Jamie, Victoria and Romana I^{2}	June 2000	
33	Prime Time	Mike Tucker	7th	Ace	July 2000	
34	Imperial Moon	Christopher Bulis	5th	Turlough and Kamelion	August 2000	
35	Festival of Death	Jonathan Morris	4th	Romana II and K-9	September 2000	
36	Independence Day	Peter Darvill-Evans	2nd and 7th^{3}	Jamie and Ace^{3}	October 2000	
37	The King of Terror	Keith Topping	5th	Tegan, Turlough and The Brigadier	November 2000	
38	The Quantum Archangel	Craig Hinton	6th	Mel	January 2001	
39	Bunker Soldiers	Martin Day	1st	Steven and Dodo	February 2001	
40	Rags	Mick Lewis	3rd	Jo and UNIT	March 2001	
41	The Shadow in the Glass	Justin Richards and Stephen Cole	6th	The Brigadier	2 April 2001	
42	Asylum	Peter Darvill-Evans	4th	Nyssa	May 2001	
43	Superior Beings	Nick Walters	5th	Peri	June 2001	
44	Byzantium!	Keith Topping	1st	Ian, Barbara and Vicki	July 2001	
45	Bullet Time	David A. McIntee	7th	Sarah Jane Smith	August 2001	
46	Psi-ence Fiction	Chris Boucher	4th	Leela	September 2001	
47	Dying in the Sun	Jon de Burgh Miller	2nd	Ben and Polly	October 2001	
48	Instruments of Darkness	Gary Russell	6th	Mel and Evelyn Smythe	November 2001	
49	Relative Dementias	Mark Michalowski	7th	Ace	January 2002	
50	Drift	Simon A. Forward	4th	Leela	February 2002	Set against winter in New Hampshire, the US military is pursuing a survivalist while battling a series of unnatural sexual pleasures. They are also holding a snow-blowing threat that could threaten the entire world if it is not stopped.
51	Palace of the Red Sun	Christopher Bulis	6th	Peri	March 2002	
52	Amorality Tale	David Bishop	3rd	Sarah	April 2002	
53	Warmonger	Terrance Dicks	5th	Peri	May 2002	
54	Ten Little Aliens	Stephen Cole	1st	Ben and Polly	June 2002	
55	Combat Rock	Mick Lewis	2nd	Jamie and Victoria	July 2002	
56	The Suns of Caresh	Paul Saint	3rd	Jo	August 2002	
57	Heritage	Dale Smith	7th	Ace	October 2002	
58	Fear of the Dark	Trevor Baxendale	5th	Tegan and Nyssa	December 2002	
59	Blue Box	Kate Orman	6th	Peri	March 2003	
60	Loving the Alien	Mike Tucker and Robert Perry	7th	Ace	May 2003	
61	The Colony of Lies	Colin Brake	2nd and 7th^{4}	Jamie, Zoe and Ace^{4}	July 2003	
62	Wolfsbane	Jacqueline Rayner	4th and 8th^{5}	Harry and Sarah^{5}	September 2003	
63	Deadly Reunion	Terrance Dicks and Barry Letts	3rd	Jo and UNIT	November 2003	
64	Scream of the Shalka	Paul Cornell	Unofficial 9th Doctor	Alison, The Master	February 2004	
65	Empire of Death	David Bishop	5th	Nyssa	March 2004	In 1863, Queen Victoria is insensate with grief after losing her husband, Prince Albert. A secret seance is planned. Concurrently, The Doctor and Nyssa are dealing with the death of their good friend, Adric. They are surprised when they are seemingly visited by the ghost of their dead friend. Everything, plus the secrets of a guarded, drowned village come together.
66	The Eleventh Tiger	David A. McIntee	1st	Ian, Barbara and Vicki	May 2004	
67	Synthespians™	Craig Hinton	6th	Peri	July 2004	
68	The Algebra of Ice	Lloyd Rose	7th	Ace	September 2004	
69	The Indestructible Man	Simon Messingham	2nd	Jamie and Zoe	November 2004	
70	Match of the Day	Chris Boucher	4th	Leela	February 2005	
71	Island of Death	Barry Letts	3rd	Sarah	July 2005	
72	Spiral Scratch	Gary Russell	6th	Mel	August 2005	
73	Fear Itself	Nick Wallace	8th	Fitz and Anji	September 2005	
74	World Game	Terrance Dicks	2nd	Lady Serena	October 2005	
75	The Time Travellers	Simon Guerrier	1st	Susan, Ian and Barbara	10 November 2005	
76	Atom Bomb Blues	Andrew Cartmel	7th	Ace	December 2005	

== Notes ==
1. Via the TARDIS thought scanner, the Sixth Doctor shows Peri a six-chapter flashback to his second incarnation's encounter with Winston Churchill and the Players.
2. Although both Doctors play crucial roles in the plot, and are even briefly simultaneously present in the TARDIS console room, the Second is unaware of the Fourth's presence; the Second Doctor unintentionally materializes in a dimensional anomaly while tinkering with the TARDIS, his presence causing the anomaly to become more unstable and the TARDIS losing its link to the interior dimensions, and the Time Lords are forced to make arrangements for the Fourth Doctor to travel to his past self's ship and restore its connection to the exterior, the Fourth Doctor and Romana hiding under the console at the opposite side from the younger Doctor and his companions after bringing interior and exterior back into alignment.
3. The Second Doctor and Jamie appear briefly at the beginning of the novel visiting the planet Mendeb Two, but do not interact with the Seventh Doctor or Ace; their actions during this visit prompt the Seventh Doctor to return.
4. The Seventh Doctor and Ace appear at the beginning and the conclusion of the novel, but Ace never meets the past Doctor and companions, and the Seventh's only contact with his other self occurs in an artificial reality simulation when the Second Doctor is attempting to access a ship's computer, the future Doctor providing his younger self with some discreet advice on how to deal with the current situation.
5. Although both Doctors play important roles in solving the crisis, their involvement takes place a month apart, with the Eighth Doctor and Harry Sullivan tackling the problem in November while the Fourth Doctor and Sarah deal with the aftermath in December. Also, Harry is the only person to interact with both Doctors (although the Fourth Doctor and Sarah learn of the Eighth's presence, neither of them appear to realise that he is the Doctor) to be fully aware of the Doctor's nature as an alien time traveller, and the Eighth's current state of amnesia — in the aftermath of The Ancestor Cell — prevents either the Eighth Doctor or Harry from recognising each other.

== See also ==
- List of Doctor Who novelists
