= Doctor Who: The Second Doctor Adventures =

Audio play series about Doctor Who

The Second Doctor Adventures

Big Finish Productions audio drama
- Series: Doctor Who
- Featuring: Second Doctor
- Produced by: Mark Wright
- Executive producers: Jason Haigh-Ellery; Nicholas Briggs
- Release date: July 2022

The Second Doctor Adventures is a Big Finish Productions audio play series based on the television series Doctor Who. Michael Troughton, son of the original actor Patrick Troughton, voices the role of the Second Doctor.

== History ==
In 1999, beginning with the story The Sirens of Time, Big Finish Productions began producing a series of audio adventures featuring the Fifth Doctor, Sixth Doctor and Seventh Doctor. For 22 years these stories continued collectively known as Big Finish's Main Range. In May 2020, Big Finish announced the main range would conclude in March 2021 and subsequently replaced with regular releases of the first 8 Doctor's adventures continuing in their own respective ranges.

A single boxset for the Second Doctor was announced in May 2021, set for release in July 2022 and titled Beyond War Games. It was announced on 1 January 2022 that Michael Troughton, son of the original actor Patrick Troughton, would voice the role of the Second Doctor.

== Cast and characters ==
List indicator

This section includes characters who will appear or have appeared in at least one season.

- A green cell indicates the actor is a main cast member.
- A red cell indicates the actor is a recurring cast member.
- A light blue cell indicates the actor is a guest or special guest cast member.

Actor	Character	Appearances				
Actor	Character	BWG	JRM	CoR	TPD	THW
Michael Troughton	The Doctor	✓	✓	✓	✓	✓
Frazer Hines	Jamie McCrimmon		✓	✓	✓	✓
Wendy Padbury	Zoe Heriot			✓	✓	✓
Emma Noakes	Raven	✓	✓	✓	✓	✓
Jon Culshaw	The Brigadier	✓				
Nicholas Briggs	The Daleks	✓			✓	

== Episodes ==
=== Series 1: Beyond War Games (2022) ===
No.	Title	Directed by	Written by	Featuring	Released
1	"The Final Beginning"	Nicholas Briggs	Mark Wright and Nicholas Briggs	Second Doctor, Daleks	July 2022
2	"Wrath of the Ice Warriors"	Nicholas Briggs	Andrew Smith	Second Doctor, Brigadier Lethbridge-Stewart, Ice Warriors	July 2022

=== Series 2: James Robert McCrimmon (2023) ===
No.	Title	Directed by	Written by	Featuring	Released
1	"Jamie"	Nicholas Briggs	Mark Wright	Second Doctor, Jamie McCrimmon	July 2023
2	"The Green Man"	Nicholas Briggs	Paul F Verhoeven	Second Doctor, Jamie McCrimmon	July 2023
3	"The Shroud"	Nicholas Briggs	Bob Ayres	Second Doctor, Jamie McCrimmon	July 2023

=== Series 3: Conspiracy of Raven (2024) ===
No.	Title	Directed by	Written by	Featuring	Released
1	"Kippers"	Nicholas Briggs	Nicholas Briggs	Second Doctor, Jamie, Zoe Herriot	July 2024
2	"Catastrophe Theory"	Nicholas Briggs	Mark Wright	Second Doctor, Jamie, Zoe Herriot	July 2024
3	"The Vanishing Point"	Nicholas Briggs	Mark Wright and Nicholas Briggs	Second Doctor, Jamie, Zoe Herriot	July 2024

=== Series 4: The Potential Daleks (2025) ===
No.	Title	Directed by	Written by	Featuring	Released
1	"Humpty Dumpty"	Nicholas Briggs	Nicholas Briggs	Second Doctor, Jamie, Zoe, Daleks	December 2025
2	"Secret of the Daleks"	Nicholas Briggs	Mark Wright	Second Doctor, Jamie, Zoe, Daleks	December 2025
3	"War of the Morai"	Nicholas Briggs	Mark Wright and Nicholas Briggs	Second Doctor, Jamie, Zoe, Daleks	December 2025

=== Series 5: The Haunted Windmill (2026) ===
No.	Title	Directed by	Written by	Featuring	Released
1	"The Haunted Windmill"	Nicholas Briggs	Alan Barnes	Second Doctor, Jamie, Zoe	August 2026
2	"The Crystal Ship"	Nicholas Briggs	Alan Barnes	Second Doctor, Jamie, Zoe	August 2026
3	"The Hungry Glass"	Nicholas Briggs	Alan Barnes	Second Doctor, Jamie, Zoe	August 2026
