= Gary Russell =

Writer

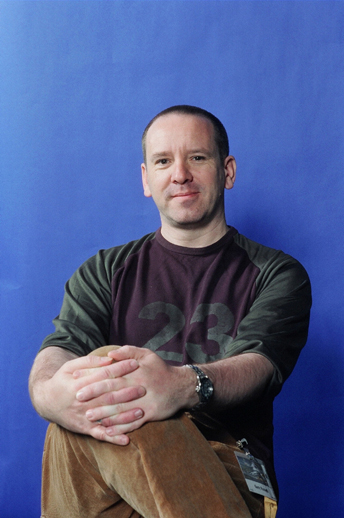
- Born: 18 September 1963 (age 62); Maidenhead, Berkshire, England
- Occupations: Author; comic book writer; script editor; former actor
- Years active: 1976–present

Gary Russell (born 18 September 1963) is a British freelance writer, producer and former child actor. As a writer, he is best known for his work in connection with the television series Doctor Who and its spin-offs in other media. As an actor, he is best known for playing Dick Kirrin in the British 1978 television series The Famous Five.

== Biography ==
Russell was born in Maidenhead, Berkshire. His on-screen acting career included leading roles in the BBC's adaptation of E. Nesbit's novel The Phoenix and the Carpet as Cyril, ITV's adaptations of Enid Blyton's Famous Five novels (as Dick) and the BBC's Look & Read schools series, playing Lord Edward Dark in Dark Towers. He also spent seasons performing with Prospect Theatre Company and the Royal National Theatre.

He has written guide books, under the pseudonym Warren Martyn, to Frasier and The Simpsons for Virgin Publishing. He was editor of Doctor Who Magazine between 1992 and 1995. He was the producer for the Doctor Who licensed audio drama tie-ins at Big Finish Productions from its inception in 1998 until July 2006, when he stepped down to work for BBC Wales as a Script Editor on Doctor Who The Sarah Jane Adventures and Torchwood. He has written a number of Doctor Who spin-off novels and in 2000 co-wrote with executive producer Philip Segal the book Doctor Who: Regeneration (HarperCollins, ISBN 0-00-710591-6), the making-of book of the 1996 Doctor Who television movie, as well as the TV movie's novelisation in 1996.

He wrote a series of The Art of The Lord of the Rings, one per film, plus a fourth featuring material that could not be fitted into the individual volumes, and contributed to Gollum: How We Made Movie Magic with Andy Serkis. He also wrote the behind-the-scenes book on the making of the Matthew Warchus directed 2007 stage musical version of The Lord of the Rings. His behind-the-scenes book Doctor Who: The Inside Story was published in October 2006, coinciding with his joining the Doctor Who production team. His most recent reference work was also for Doctor Who; published in 2007 by BBC Books, The Doctor Who Encyclopedia is a guide to the current Doctor Who series (2005–present), which has been regularly updated (most recently in 2012) and published both in hardback and via an app. He also wrote a similar encyclopedia for Torchwood and The Torchwood Archive, a semi-fictional guide to the show. He also co-produced and directed the animated mini series The Infinite Quest and Dreamland, which tied in with the current television series of Doctor Who as well as a series of award-winning animated online games also based on the show.

In 2011, having left BBC Wales, he briefly returned to Big Finish to produce the Bernice Summerfield and Gallifrey audios, before moving to Australia and becoming the Executive Producer at animation company Planet 55 Studios. There he has overseen the development and production of a new children's sci-fi cartoon Prisoner Zero for ABC Television. He returned to the UK in 2016 and continues to write, produce and direct.

== Credits ==
=== Film and TV ===
Year	Title	Role	Notes
1976–77	The Phoenix and the Carpet	Cyril	
1978–79	The Famous Five	Dick Kirrin	
1981	Look and Read: Dark Towers	Lord Edward Dark	
1982	A Shocking Accident	School Captain	Short film
1982	Schoolgirl Chums	Stephen	
1983	Octopussy	Teenager in car	Uncredited

=== Stage ===
Year	Title	Role	Notes
1975	A Month in the Country	Kolya	Prospect Theatre Company
1980–81	The Browning Version/Harlequinade	Taplow/Halbidere	Royal National Theatre, London/Baltimore

== Bibliography ==
=== Comics ===
- Doctor Who (in Doctor Who Magazine No. 173, 235–237, 1991, 1996, and in Radio Times issues dated 1 June 1996 – 2 March 1997)

=== IDW Doctor Who comic book ===
At the 2007 San Diego Comic-Con, IDW Publishing announced their intention to publish a new series of Doctor Who comics, which will follow the adventures of the Tenth Doctor and Martha Jones. The first six issues of this series, later collected as Agent Provocateur, were scripted by Russell and published in early 2008. He has also written a number of Torchwood strips for Titan Publishing.

=== Books ===
Fiction
Year	Title	Notes
1994	Doctor Who: Legacy	Series: Virgin New Adventures
1995	Doctor Who: Invasion of the Cat-People	Series: Virgin Missing Adventures
1996	Doctor Who: The Scales of Injustice	Series: Virgin Missing Adventures
1996	Doctor Who: The Novel of the Film	Novelization
1997	The New Adventures: Deadfall	Series: Virgin New Adventures
1997	Doctor Who: Business Unusual	Series: Past Doctor Adventures
1998	Doctor Who: Placebo Effect	Series: Eighth Doctor Adventures
1999	Doctor Who: Divided Loyalties	Series: Past Doctor Adventures
2001	Doctor Who: Instruments of Darkness	Series: Past Doctor Adventures
2005	Doctor Who: Spiral Scratch	Series: Past Doctor Adventures
2007	The Sarah Jane Adventures: Warriors of Kudlak	Novelization
2008	Doctor Who: Beautiful Chaos	Series: New Series Adventures
2008	Torchwood: The Twilight Streets	
2008	The Sarah Jane Adventures: The Lost Boy	Novelization
2008	The Sarah Jane Adventures: The Last Sontaran	Novelization
2010	Doctor Who: The Glamour Chase	Series: New Series Adventures
2010	The Sarah Jane Adventures: Death of the Doctor	Novelization
2012	Doctor Who: Horror of the Space Snakes	Collected in the book Doctor Who Book 5: Monstrous Missions
2014	Bernice Summerfield: Adorable Illusion	
2015	Doctor Who: Big Bang Generation	Series: New Series Adventures
2021	Robin of Sherwood: Here Be Dragons	

Short fiction
Year	Title	Published in
1998	"Missing, Part One: Business as Usual"	Doctor Who: More Short Trips
1998	"64 Carlysle Street"	Doctor Who: More Short Trips
2000	"Countdown to TV Action"	Doctor Who: Short Trips and Sidesteps
2003	"A Boy’s Tale"	Doctor Who - Short Trips: Companions
2004	"Repercussions..."	Doctor Who - Short Trips: Repercussions
2006	"Echoes"	Doctor Who - Short Trips: The Centenarian
2007	"The Report"	Doctor Who - Short Trips: Snapshots
2007	"Do You Dream in Colour"	Doctor Who - Short Trips: The Ghosts of Christmas

Non-fiction and reference books
Year	Title	Notes
2001	Doctor Who: Regeneration	With Philip Segal
2004	The Art of The Lord of the Rings	
2006	Doctor Who: The Inside Story	

Audio dramas
Year	Title	Notes
2013	The Chronicles of Dorian Gray: The Picture of Loretta Delphine	

== Directing credits ==
Audio dramas
Year	Title	Notes
1999	Doctor Who: Whispers of Terror	
2000	Doctor Who: The Land of the Dead	
2000	Doctor Who: The Fearmonger	
2000	Doctor Who: The Marian Conspiracy	
2000	Doctor Who: Red Dawn	
2000	Doctor Who: Winter for the Adept	
2000	Doctor Who: The Fires of Vulcan	
2000	Doctor Who: The Shadow of the Scourge	
2000	Bernice Summerfield: The Secret of Cassandra	
2001	Doctor Who: Storm Warning	
2001	Doctor Who: The Stones of Venice	
2001	Doctor Who: Dust Breeding	
2001	Bernice Summerfield: The Extinction Event	
2001	Doctor Who: Bloodtide	
2001	Doctor Who: Project: Twilight	
2001	Doctor Who: The Eye of the Scorpion	
2001	Doctor Who: Colditz	
2001	Doctor Who: Primeval	
2001	Doctor Who: The One Doctor	
2002	Doctor Who: The Ratings War	
2002	Doctor Who: Excelis Dawns	
2002	Doctor Who: Seasons of Fear	
2002	Bernice Summerfield: The Green-Eyed Monsters	
2002	Doctor Who: Excelis Decays	
2002	Doctor Who: Neverland	
2002	Doctor Who: Spare Parts	
2002	Sarah Jane Smith: Comeback	
2002	Sarah Jane Smith: The TAO Connection	
2002	Doctor Who: The Sandman	
2002	Sarah Jane Smith: Ghost Town	
2002	Sarah Jane Smith: Mirror, Signal, Manoeuvre	
2002	Doctor Who: The Maltese Penguin	
2002	Doctor Who: The Church and the Crown	
2002	Doctor Who: Real Time	Also writer.
2003	Doctor Who: No Place Like Home	
2003	Bernice Summerfield: The Mirror Effect	
2003	Bernice Summerfield: The Bellotron Incident	
2003	Bernice Summerfield: The Draconian Rage	
2003	Doctor Who: Project: Lazarus	
2003	Doctor Who: Sympathy for the Devil	
2003	Doctor Who: Flip-Flop	
2003	Doctor Who: Omega	
2003	Doctor Who: He Jests at Scars...	Also writer.
2003	Doctor Who: Davros	
2003	Judge Dredd: War Planet	
2003	Doctor Who: Master	
2003	Doctor Who: Zagreus	Also writer with Alan Barnes.
2003	Doctor Who: The Wormery	
2003	Doctor Who: Living Legend	
2003	Doctor Who: Scherzo	

== Awards ==
In April 2022, Gary Russell was given the inaugural Terrance Dicks Award For Writers by the Doctor Who Appreciation Society.

Preceded by John Freeman	Doctor Who Magazine Editor; 1992–1995	Succeeded by Gary Gillatt
