= Second Doctor =

Incarnation of a fictional character from Doctor Who

The Doctor
The Second Doctor
- Doctor Who character
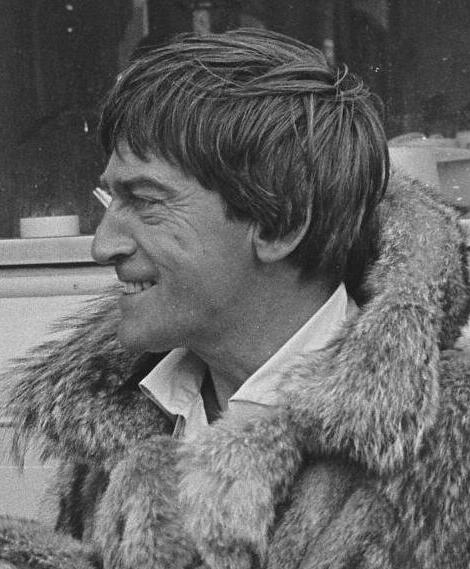
- Troughton as the Second Doctor during filming of The Abominable Snowmen (1967)
- First regular appearance: The Power of the Daleks (1966)
- Last regular appearance: The War Games (1969)
- Introduced by: Innes Lloyd
- Portrayed by: Patrick Troughton
- Preceded by: William Hartnell (First Doctor)
- Succeeded by: Jon Pertwee (Third Doctor)

Information
- Tenure: 5 November 1966 – 21 June 1969
- No of series: 3
- Appearances: 21 stories (119 episodes)
- Companions: Ben Jackson Polly; Jamie McCrimmon; Victoria Waterfield; Zoe Heriot
- Chronology: Season 4 (1966–1967); Season 5 (1967–1968); Season 6 (1968–1969); Season 10 (1972–1973); Season 20 (1983); Season 22 (1985)

The Second Doctor is an incarnation of the Doctor, the protagonist of the British science fiction television series Doctor Who. He was portrayed by actor Patrick Troughton. Within the series' narrative, the Doctor is a centuries-old alien Time Lord from the planet Gallifrey who travels in time and space in the TARDIS, frequently with companions. At the end of life, the Doctor regenerates; as a result, the physical appearance and personality of the Doctor changes. The introduction of the Second Doctor was the first to portray the concept of regeneration (a concept not yet fully realised, instead called "renewal") and was a significant moment in the evolution of the series, eventually becoming a critical element for its longevity.

Preceded in regeneration by the First Doctor (William Hartnell), he is followed by the Third Doctor (Jon Pertwee). Troughton's Doctor was an outwardly scruffy, light hearted and bumbling tramp, a portrayal that was called the "cosmic hobo". The Second possessed a comical demeanor that he used to manipulate his enemies. His original companions were Ben Jackson and Polly Wright (Michael Craze and Anneke Wills), a sophisticated socialite and a working-class sailor, who were companions of his previous incarnation. They were later joined by Jamie McCrimmon (Frazer Hines), an 18th century Scotsman, who became the Second Doctor's longest-serving companion. Following Ben and Polly's departures, the Doctor and Jamie were joined by the Victorian orphan Victoria Waterfield (Deborah Watling) and 21st century astrophysicist Zoe Heriot (Wendy Padbury). The Second Doctor would be colloquially dubbed "the monster Doctor" for the prevalence of new and returning monsters, an encompassing term for the series' antagonists, in his episodes.

The Second Doctor concluded his tenure by the end of the 1969 serial The War Games, where he is forced to regenerate by the Time Lords, with his future incarnation banished to Earth as further punishment, although the existence of a "Season 6B" suggesting the Second Doctor continued to live past the finale of The War Games has remained a popular topic within Doctor Who expanded universe media. After his departure, Troughton reprised the role for multiple guest appearances in later episodes of the series, beginning with The Three Doctors (1973). He made his last appearance in The Two Doctors (1985) alongside the Sixth Doctor (Colin Baker), with Troughton dying two years later. Since then, the Second Doctor has been featured in video games, novels, and via archival footage in the revival series.

Despite contemporary reception being mixed towards the Second Doctor, the character would undergo a critical reevaluation that has proven largely favourable. The Second has frequently been cited as a significant influence on later actors that went on to portray the Doctor, being referred to by several of them as their personal favourite. The Second Doctor's era was victim to wiping, a process where tapes of older episodes would be erased for newer material to be recorded over, which was common practice at the BBC between the 1950s to the latter half of the 1970s. As a result, nearly half of the episodes featuring the Second Doctor have been lost.

== Biography ==
By the end of The Tenth Planet (1966), the First Doctor's (William Hartnell) health had degraded rapidly as he feebly tells companions Ben and Polly (Michael Craze and Anneke Wills) "[it's] far from being all over." Shortly thereafter he collapses and seemingly dies from old age. As he lies on the floor of the TARDIS, his face morphs, and his physical form changes into that of the Second Doctor.

At the beginning of The Power of the Daleks (1966), the Second Doctor awakens discombobulated, "referring to his old incarnation in the third person" and having to rely on notes from within his predecessor's diary to recall his memories. He has an initially adversarial first encounter with a sceptical Ben and Polly, where he attempts to explain that he had been "renewed". Not long after, they arrive on the Earth colony planet of Vulcan, where the Doctor is mistaken for a dead Earth official, summoned by the deputy governor to investigate rebel activities. There, the Doctor finds out that their chief scientist has found inert Daleks that he plans to repower, which the Doctor tries to warn against due to the Daleks' evil nature. The reactivated Daleks pretend to be the colonists' servants, convincing them to produce more of their kind, but in actuality have allied with the colony's rebels with plans for a coup d'état. The Doctor eventually stops the Daleks by overloading their power, saving Vulcan, although with many of its people having been "massacre[d]" by the end.

In The Highlanders (1966–67), the three arrive in Scotland after the Battle of Culloden where they meet Jamie McCrimmon (Frazer Hines), a member of the Highland Army, who joins their crew by the adventure's end. The Moonbase (1967) marked the return of the Cybermen, last seen in The Tenth Planet, who would become a recurring threat for the Second Doctor, facing him an additional three times after in The Tomb of the Cybermen (1967), The Wheel in Space (1968) and The Invasion (1968). Companions Ben and Polly departed the Doctor's company at the end of The Faceless Ones (1967), returning to their original time of the Swinging Sixties.

In The Evil of the Daleks (1967), the Second and Jamie were joined by Victoria Waterfield (Deborah Watling) after an adventure in Victorian England. Once again facing the Daleks, the story saw the Doctor infuse the "human factor" into a large segment of their population, sparking a civil war that, to the Doctor's knowledge, wipes out the Daleks for good, as he calls it "[t]he final end". Victoria remained with the Doctor until Fury from the Deep (1968), when she, after vocalising her weariness throughout the adventure, decides to bid him farewell.

The Second Doctor was the first of his incarnations to meet Brigadier Lethbridge-Stewart (Nicholas Courtney), crossing each others' paths as they battled the Great Intelligence (Jack Woolgar) and his Yetis in the London Underground in The Web of Fear (1968). The Brigadier would become a recurring ally of the Doctor's and one of the founders of UNIT, a military organisation with the purpose of "defend[ing] the world from alien incursions" starting in The Invasion.

At the conclusion of The Wheel in Space, companion Zoe Heriot (Wendy Padbury), a 21st century astrophysicist, would join the Second Doctor after sneaking aboard the TARDIS as a stowaway and convincing him to let her stay. The Second travelled with Jamie and Zoe for the remainder of his tenure until The War Games (1969), when the Doctor, after defeating the villainous War Lord (Philip Madoc), is forced to contact the Time Lords to help return displaced soldiers who had been abducted from different conflicts throughout human history back to their own times. Facing judgment for interfering with human history, the Time Lords wipe Jamie and Zoe's memories, sentence the Doctor to exile on Earth, and force him to regenerate into his next incarnation.

The Second would return in subsequent eras presumably set prior to his regeneration. He would tag along to aide the First and Third Doctor (Jon Pertwee), joined by companion Jo Grant (Katy Manning), in defeating Omega (Stephen Thorne) in The Three Doctors (1972–1973), having been sent there on behalf of the Time Lords. Returning in "The Five Doctors" (1983), the Second, alongside his predecessor and their next three succeeding incarnations, are extracted from time by Lord President Borusa (Philip Latham) and placed in the Death Zone back on their home planet of Gallifrey. In the Second's case, he was abducted while in the midst of "bend[ing] the laws of time" to reunite with Brigadier Lethbridge-Stewart. In the Second's last full appearance in The Two Doctors (1985), Jamie and him are tasked by the Time Lords with stopping unlawful time travel experimentation aboard an alien spacecraft as carried out by Dastari (Laurence Payne), the station's head of projects, only for them to be ambushed and kidnapped by Sontarans, allied with augmented Androgums Chessene (Jacqueline Pearce) and Shockeye (John Stratton). Thanks to the interference of the Sixth Doctor (Colin Baker) and companion Peri Brown (Nicola Bryant), the Second and Jamie are rescued and able to succeed in their mission.

=== Season 6B ===
A popular fan theory which has been explored within the Doctor Who continuity is "Season 6B", a concept first conceived in 1996's The Discontinuity Guide by Paul Cornell, Martin Day and Keith Topping. Season 6B attests that the Second Doctor, following the end of The War Games (1969), did not immediately regenerate into the Third Doctor but was assigned to various missions by the Time Lords before he was allowed to.

A visibly aged Second Doctor in The Two Doctors (1985), which is regularly attributed to "Season 6B"

Attributed to this are apparent continuity errors within the Second Doctor's reappearances in later episodes following his tenure. Whereas the end of The War Games is "clearly the Doctor's first contact with the Time Lords since he left Gallifrey", the Second credits them in The Three Doctors (1972–1973) as having sent him to assist the Third, and in "The Five Doctors" (1983) the Second makes reference to companions Jamie and Zoe having their memories wiped, which occurred at the very end of The War Games. The Two Doctors (1985) not only sees the Second make reference to the Time Lords sending him on a mission once more, (Note: According to scriptwriter Robert Holmes, the Second Doctor's missions for the Time Lords took place prior to the events of The War Games, with him saying "[the Time Lords] 'framed' the Troughton Doctor and got him to do various things for them, and then hauled him up in front of them on trial.) with companion Jamie aware of who they are, but he has also visibly aged with "considerable signs of graying".

Season 6B was acknowledged and adopted as canon by Terrance Dicks for his work in the Past Doctor Adventures and Eighth Doctor Adventures novelisation lines, with entries such as The Eight Doctors, Players and World Game exploring the subject. Season 6B was also incorporated into Big Finish Productions's audio drama series Beyond War Games, released in July 2022, which takes place directly after the events of The War Games and sees the Second Doctor (played by Troughton's son, Michael) continue to exist past his "supposed regeneration".

=== Other appearances ===
The Second Doctor has been featured in numerous expanded universe material in the Doctor Who franchise. He has also been portrayed in the revival series via archival footage in such episodes as "The Name of the Doctor" and "The Day of the Doctor" (both 2013). The Second has featured in Big Finish's Second Doctor Adventures since 2022 as portrayed by Michael Troughton, previously having guest appearances in stories such as 2013's The Light at the End.

==== Novels ====
The Second Doctor headlined novels from the Virgin Missing Adventures line beginning in 1995, such as The Menagerie by Martin Day and Invasion of the Cat-People by Gary Russell. The Second also featured in BBC Books's Past Doctor Adventures, appearing in novels such as Foreign Devils by Andrew Cartmel, featuring Jamie and Zoe in 19th century Qing China, and The Roundheads by Mark Gatiss, featuring Jamie, Ben and Polly where they encounter the eponymous Roundheads at the end of the Second English Civil War.

The Second Doctor makes a cameo appearance in the Sixth Doctor Past Doctor Adventures book Players by Terrance Dicks, where he meets Winston Churchill in France during World War I, set after the events of The War Games (1969). The Second also cameoed in the Eighth Doctor Adventures entry The Eight Doctors, also by Dicks, where the Eighth Doctor meets the Second Doctor, set during the events of The War Games.

==== Video games ====
The Second Doctor was one of three playable incarnations of the character (the other two being the Fourth and Seventh) featured in 1992's Dalek Attack. The Second appeared alongside the first seven incarnations of the Doctor in 1998's Destiny of the Doctors, where he and the others have been captured by the Master (Anthony Ainley) and must be rescued by the player character. The Second was also featured in 2015's Lego Dimensions as one of the incarnations of the Doctor the player could unlock and play as.

== Development ==
=== Casting ===
William Hartnell, who portrayed the First Doctor since the programme's inception in 1963, was to leave the series due to poor health, with The Tenth Planet (1966) scheduled to be his last appearance. The BBC were still interested in producing the series, however, and sought to have Hartnell recast. Attempting to explain the recast to audiences, writers Kit Pedler and Gerry Davis devised the concept of regeneration, although it was not called regeneration at this point, instead being referred to as a "metaphysical change" within the serial's production report and as a "renewal" in the following story, The Power of the Daleks (1966). The process was designed to not only alter the character's appearance, but also their personality, which would allow the next actor to take on the part freedom to do their own take on the character. This freedom allowed the production team to avoid comparisons between Hartnell and the next actor to take on the part, with the book Doctor Who: A History stating that "you couldn't complain that the new Doctor wasn't exactly like the previous one if he wasn't supposed to be."

Series co-creator Sydney Newman put forward Patrick Troughton, a prominent character actor of the time, as Hartnell's ideal replacement. Troughton had initially been considered for the role of Johnny Ringo in The Gunfighters (1966). Hartnell was reported to have endorsed Troughton as his successor, saying "the only man in England who could posssibly [sic] replace me is Patrick Troughton". Troughton initially declined the offer, believing the show would not last beyond Hartnell, but he eventually accepted due to the financial incentives offered.

=== Characterisation ===
The Second Doctor's personality differed from Hartnell's First Doctor in his "more overtly friendly" demeanour and his willingness to be "far more physical in demonstrating affection". The Second Doctor was initially designed to have a "sardonic, suspicious" personality, similar to the character Sherlock Holmes, who was haunted by the trauma of a galactic war that caused him to flee from his people. Troughton disliked this characterisation, believing it made the Doctor a "verbose autocrat". Newman also disliked the idea, and he suggested the Doctor be a whimsical character to contrast Hartnell's "gruff" nature. Newman instructed Troughton to do whatever he liked with the role, encouraging him to make it his own, and suggested he emulate Charlie Chaplin as one possibility, which Troughton went with. Recounting in an interview in 1985, Troughton said that "[Chaplin] was such a genius of a mime. But that's what Sidney [sic] Newman had in mind, he kept egging me on to do strange wonderful things in the way of mime, which I was incapable of doing, so I tried to do it all up there in my head". An element producer Innes Lloyd and Davis, now script editor, wished to change from Hartnell's era for Troughton's was pivoting away from a "filmed stage production" look. As a result, the Second Doctor proved far more prone to action than his predecessor.

In contrast to Hartnell, Troughton "took the path of playing up the Doctor's whimsical nature...whose clowning meant he'd be underestimated by his adversaries". Troughton would credit his young children, with three below the age of ten at the time, for keeping him in touch with his childish side throughout his tenure. The Second Doctor would frequently have a recorder within his possession, "often finding clever ways to use music to lull his enemies, or even doubling the instrument up as a spyglass or blowpipe". The Second also "relishes the use of disguises, play-acting and accents" in achieving his goals, although these aspects of the character were gradually toned down as his tenure went on. Despite this nature, Troughton wished to retain some of the "danger" of Hartnell's incarnation, with Troughton's take on the character retaining his high intelligence and situational awareness while hiding it under the guise of a fool.

Troughton developed a strong and familial relationship with co-star Frazer Hines, who played companion Jamie McCrimmon. Jamie was portrayed as "fiercely loyal" to the Second Doctor and became one of the longest-running assistants in Doctor Who's history. In-universe, Jamie was with the Second for "almost the entirety of [the Doctor's life]". Hines had originally planned to leave the show before Troughton's final serial, but was convinced by Troughton to stay until the very end of his tenure.

=== Appearance ===
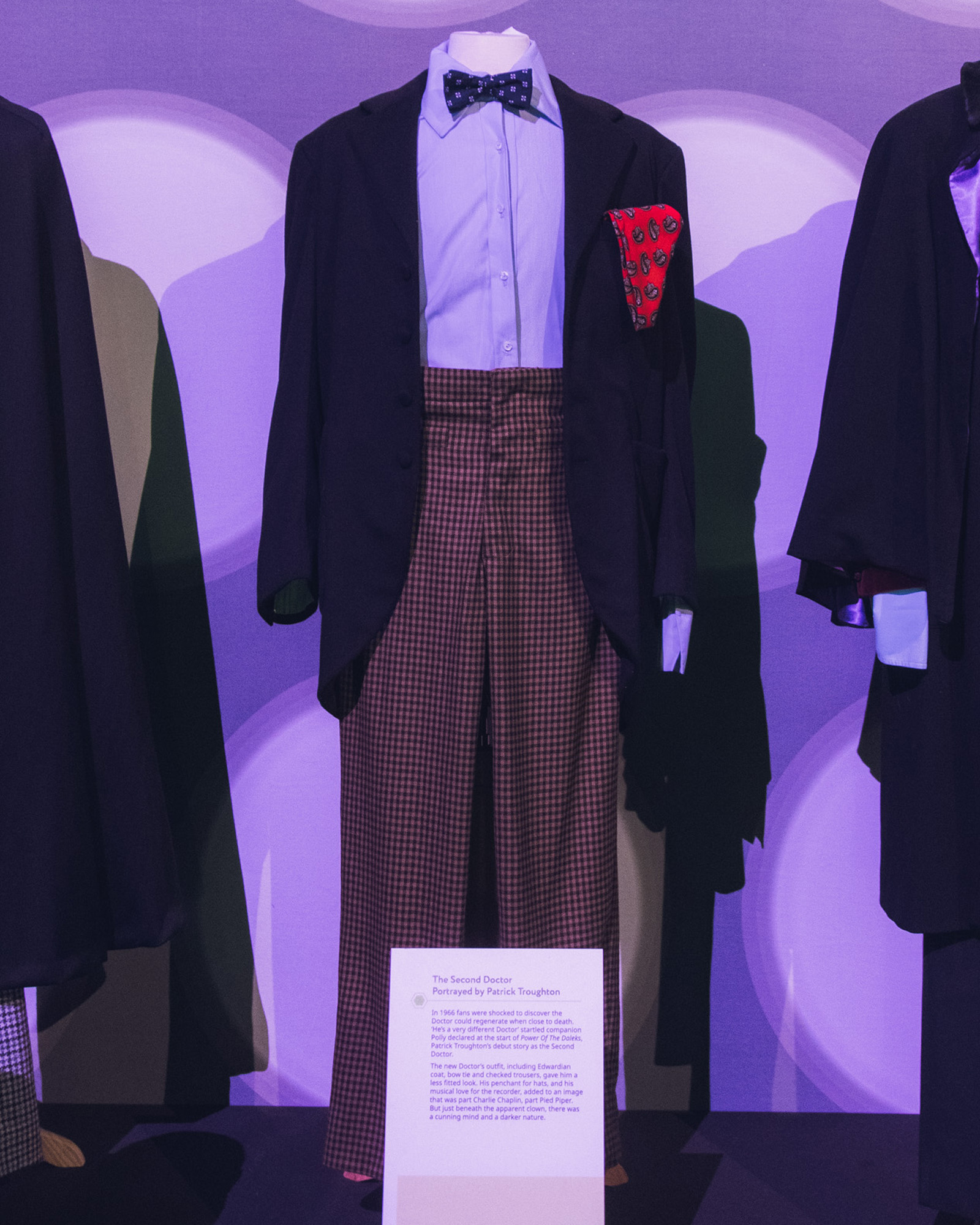
The Second Doctor's costume

Dubbed the "cosmic hobo" by Newman, Troughton's costume was borne from discussion between the actor himself, Lloyd, and Davis. The Second Doctor wore an oversized black frock coat over a button-down collar shirt with a bowtie. He wore baggy orange or black houndstooth trousers, which were held up by braces, and occasionally a stovepipe hat, although this became less a fixture as Troughton "mellowed" into the role. The Second also possessed a distinctive "mop top" of jet black hair, which Troughton would deny was a wig.

Troughton originally had the idea to wear blackface with a turban, earrings and a beard for the role "so no one would recognise him" in an effort to avoid possible typecasting, but this idea was rejected by Newman. Other ideas suggested by Troughton, including "playing him like a Windjammer captain", were similarly denied.

In stories set in colder environments, the Second Doctor occasionally wore an "enormous" fur coat, first seen in The Abominable Snowmen (1967).

=== Story style and lost episodes ===
The Second Doctor has been dubbed "the monster Doctor" by fans, a name originating from his tenure's shift away from historical and "pseudo-historical" episodes in favour of episodes focused primarily on introducing new monsters. The Highlanders (1966–1967) would prove to be an exception, which was the only pure historical episode of his era. Season 5 of Doctor Who was even coined the "monster season" for introducing the Ice Warriors and the Yetis, and for featuring two separate serials with the returning Cybermen. The Second Doctor's era is also similarly credited for popularising the "'base under siege' motif", wherein "there's a small base in a hostile location like the Moon or the South Pole, and monsters are trying to get in".

The Second Doctor is also nicknamed "the missing Doctor", due to a large amount of his episodes being unavailable from the BBC Archives. Episodes featuring the First and Second Doctors were subject to wiping by the BBC during the 1970s, a common practice to save on tape that would be recorded over. Since the last discovery of Second Doctor episodes in 2013, that being The Enemy of the World (1967–1968) and most of The Web of Fear (1968), 53 of his 119 episodes remain lost.

== Reception ==
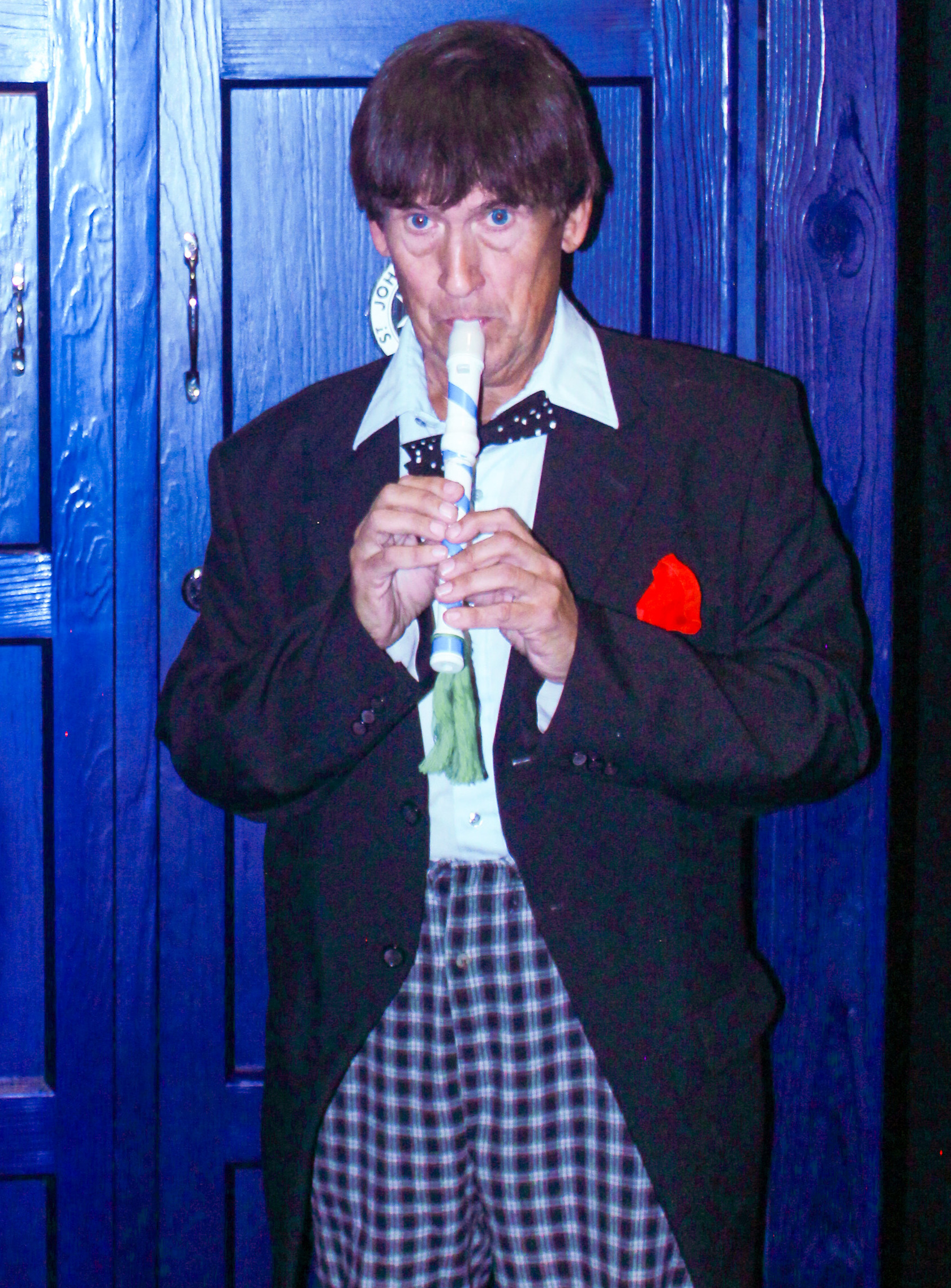
A fan cosplays as the Second Doctor while playing the character's signature recorder

Troughton received a mixed reception from viewers at first; letters sent to the Radio Times both praised "the superb character he has created" and criticised "a wonderful series" for turning into "what looked like Coco the Clown". An internal BBC audience report commissioned at the time documented that a sizable portion were "scarcely interested at all", with a dominant viewpoint being that the Doctor, viewed as "a brilliant but eccentric scientist", was now "a half-witted clown". It was felt that the "broad comedy moments" prevalent in the Second Doctor's first season were failing to warm audiences to him, so they were reduced for future appearances. Despite this, ratings under Troughton saw an increase from where they were at the end of William Hartnell's tenure, and the Second's "gleefully anti-authoritarian" persona appealed to the youth culture of the era.

Since his time on television, the Second's reception has vastly improved. His significance for having "[sold] the untested regeneration concept" to audiences has been credited as saving the series from a potential early demise, and his first season finale, The Evil of the Daleks (1967), was voted the best Doctor Who story by readers of Dreamwatch magazine in 1993. Although there exists some contemporary criticism that his era overused the threat of "alien menaces attempting to invade", prominent examples of this, such as The Tomb of the Cybermen (1967), have nevertheless continued to receive praise.

Peter Davison, Colin Baker, Sylvester McCoy, and Matt Smith, who portrayed the Fifth, Sixth, Seventh, and Eleventh Doctors, respectively, have stated that the Second Doctor is their favourite. Smith has also stated that the Eleventh Doctor's costume, particularly the bowtie, was heavily influenced by the Second Doctor. Christopher Eccleston, who played the Ninth Doctor, also cited Troughton as an influence prior to having portrayed the character, describing the Second incarnation as "compelling and a little bit frightening".
