= Doctor Who season 5 =

1967–1968 season of British sci-fi TV series

Doctor Who
- Season 5
- Cover art of the original Region 2 DVD release for the first serial of the season
- Starring: Patrick Troughton; Frazer Hines; Deborah Watling; Wendy Padbury
- No. of stories: 7
- No. of episodes: 40 (18 missing)

Release
- Original network: BBC1
- Original release: 2 September 1967 – 1 June 1968

Season chronology
- ← Previous; Season 4 Next → Season 6

The fifth season of the British science fiction television series Doctor Who was originally broadcast on BBC1 between 1967 and 1968. The season started on 2 September 1967 with the story The Tomb of the Cybermen and ended on 1 June 1968 with The Wheel in Space. The season saw several changes in behind the scenes production, with producer Innes Lloyd stepping down and being replaced by story editor Peter Bryant in the role. Due to Bryant's training for and eventual promotion to producer, the role of story editor underwent multiple shifts. Victor Pemberton initially took over, though left early into the season to focus on writing his own stories. Derrick Sherwin took over after Pemberton's departure, though was not keen on the part and brought in Terrance Dicks to serve as his assistant story editor with hopes to train him as his replacement.

The season continued to star Patrick Troughton in the role of the Second Doctor, an alien who travels in time and space in a time machine known as the TARDIS, a ship which greatly resembles a British police box. Frazer Hines reprises his role as the Doctor's companion Jamie McCrimmon from the prior season, and Deborah Watling reprises her part of Victoria Waterfield, introduced in the fourth season's finale The Evil of the Daleks (1967), in a main cast role as well. Watling played the part for most of the fifth season, departing in the penultimate serial, Fury from the Deep (1968), due to a lack of strong material for the character and to avoid typecasting. The character of Zoe Heriot, portrayed by actress Wendy Padbury, was introduced in The Wheel in Space as a new companion. The season also features Jack Watling, Deborah Watling's father, in the recurring role of Professor Travers across two serials. The Web of Fear (1968) also introduces Nicholas Courtney as the character Colonel Lethbridge-Stewart; Lethbridge-Stewart would go on to appear in a major recurring role throughout the rest of the show's original run.

The serials in this season were written by Kit Pedler, Gerry Davis, Henry Lincoln, Mervyn Haisman, Brian Hayles, David Whitaker, and Pemberton. The season's serials focused on writing stories featuring various monsters, largely due to the departure of the highly popular Daleks from the series in The Evil of the Daleks. As a result, emphasis was put onto creating new recurring enemies. The Cybermen, Pedler and Davis's creations, were brought back for two serials, while Lincoln and Haisman's Yeti were introduced in the season and also appeared in two serials. Additionally, Hayles's creations, the Ice Warriors, were introduced in this season and reappeared in later stories. The season featured a story archetype known as "Base Under Siege", during which the characters are largely isolated on one set and attacked by an external force; the only story in the season not to use this format or feature any monster was Whitaker's The Enemy of the World (1967–1968). The serials were directed by Morris Barry, Gerald Blake, Derek Martinus, Barry Letts, Douglas Camfield, Hugh David, and Tristan de Vere Cole. Filming was largely done in studio on sets, primarily at Riverside Studios and Ealing Studios. Several serials utilised on-location filming, notably The Abominable Snowmen (1967), which was filmed at Snowdonia and was at the time the series' longest on-location shoot. Filming for the season started in June 1967 and wrapped by May 1968.

The fifth season has received largely positive responses from critics and viewers. The season's Base Under Siege format and focus on monsters influenced much of how the series was viewed publicly, and additionally influenced the development of later stories in the series. The season introduced numerous major concepts and characters that appeared frequently later in the series, such as Lethbridge-Stewart, the Yeti, the Ice Warriors, and the sonic screwdriver, a device the Doctor uses throughout the rest of the show. The season is also credited with firmly establishing the Cybermen as major antagonists within the series. Many of the season's episodes were wiped by the BBC throughout the years following its airing in order to reuse the video tapes they were held on. As a result, only 22 out of the season's 40 episodes are held in the BBC archives; 18 remain missing, with only The Tomb of the Cybermen and The Enemy of the World being retained in the BBC's archives in their entirety. Many of the season's missing episodes have been reconstructed in animated form in later releases.

== Main cast ==
- Patrick Troughton as the Second Doctor. He is a Time Lord who travels throughout time in space in a ship known as the TARDIS, which greatly resembles a British police box. While traveling, he and his traveling companions get involved in various adventures across the universe. The Second Doctor has an unassuming, clownish demeanor which belies a deep intelligence and inquisitive prowess. His shabby clothing has led to critics describing him as a "cosmic hobo". Troughton also portrays the character of Salamander, a dictator who appears in The Enemy of the World who is identical in appearance to the Second Doctor.
- Frazer Hines as Jamie McCrimmon. Jamie is a young man who hails from the Scottish highlands in 1746, joining the Doctor after meeting him following Battle of Culloden. Due to hailing from several centuries in the past, Jamie is largely unfamiliar with many aspects of the future, such as airplanes, though he is highly intelligent and adapts quickly to his newfound environment. He trusts the Doctor deeply and does his best to keep him safe, though is willing to call him out on his actions if need be. He treats Victoria like a younger sister, and has a friendly, albeit bickering, relationship with Zoe.
- Deborah Watling as Victoria Waterfield. Victoria is a young girl from the Victorian era, now an orphan following the death of her father while combatting the Daleks. She has a "prim", demure personality, though also has a tendency to scream when encountering monsters. She longs to settle down in one place, and eventually stops traveling with the Doctor and Jamie, tired of winding up in dangerous situations, electing to stay behind and settle down with a 20th century family.
- Wendy Padbury as Zoe Heriot. Zoe is a teenage genius who hails from the far future. She is highly intelligent and assertive, acting as an intellectual challenge to the Doctor. Zoe is trained in logic and uses it to approach situations, leading to conflict with the Doctor and Jamie, who follow a less logical approach in their adventures. Zoe ends up stowing away aboard the TARDIS and joining them in their adventures.

== Serials ==
No. story	No. in season	Serial title	Episode titles	Directed by	Written by	Original release date	Prod. code	UK viewers (millions)	AI
37	1	The Tomb of the Cybermen	"Episode 1"	Morris Barry	Kit Pedler and Gerry Davis	2 September 1967	MM	6.0	53
37	1	The Tomb of the Cybermen	"Episode 2"	Morris Barry	Kit Pedler and Gerry Davis	9 September 1967	MM	6.4	52
37	1	The Tomb of the Cybermen	"Episode 3"	Morris Barry	Kit Pedler and Gerry Davis	16 September 1967	MM	7.2	49
37	1	The Tomb of the Cybermen	"Episode 4"	Morris Barry	Kit Pedler and Gerry Davis	23 September 1967	MM	7.4	50
On taking Victoria on her first trip away, the TARDIS crew arrives on Telos where they find an expedition, led by Kaftan and Klieg, excavating the tomb of the Cybermen. Kaftan and Klieg betray the team and reveal that they plan to awaken the Cybermen to further their dreams of universal conquest. The Cybermen, led by the Cyber-Controller, attempt to capture the crew, convert them into Cybermen, and revive their mission of conquering the universe. Kaftan and Klieg's servant Toberman is captured as a minion of the Cybermen. During the ensuing conflict, Kaftan and Klieg are killed and Toberman ends up sacrificing himself to kill the Controller and seal the Cybermen back in their tombs.
38	2	The Abominable Snowmen	"Episode One"^{†}	Gerald Blake	Mervyn Haisman and Henry Lincoln	30 September 1967	NN	6.3	50
38	2	The Abominable Snowmen	"Episode Two"	Gerald Blake	Mervyn Haisman and Henry Lincoln	7 October 1967	NN	6.0	52
38	2	The Abominable Snowmen	"Episode Three"^{†}	Gerald Blake	Mervyn Haisman and Henry Lincoln	14 October 1967	NN	7.1	51
38	2	The Abominable Snowmen	"Episode Four"^{†}	Gerald Blake	Mervyn Haisman and Henry Lincoln	21 October 1967	NN	7.1	50
38	2	The Abominable Snowmen	"Episode Five"^{†}	Gerald Blake	Mervyn Haisman and Henry Lincoln	28 October 1967	NN	7.2	51
38	2	The Abominable Snowmen	"Episode Six"^{†}	Gerald Blake	Mervyn Haisman and Henry Lincoln	4 November 1967	NN	7.4	52
The TARDIS crew arrive on a cold and windy hillside within the Himalayas, where they encounter Edward Travers, who is hunting for the yeti. The Doctor heads to a nearby Tibetan monastery, where he meets Padmasambhava, the immortal master of the monastery. The Doctor discovers that reports of yeti attacks are actually being orchestrated by robot Yeti. The robots are controlled by the Great Intelligence, who has possessed Padmasambhava and attempts to attain material form. After the technology controlling the Yeti is destroyed, the Intelligence departs Padmasambhava as he dies, and Travers departs in search of a real yeti.
39	3	The Ice Warriors	"One"	Derek Martinus	Brian Hayles	11 November 1967	OO	6.7	52
39	3	The Ice Warriors	"Two"^{†}	Derek Martinus	Brian Hayles	18 November 1967	OO	7.1	52
39	3	The Ice Warriors	"Three"^{†}	Derek Martinus	Brian Hayles	25 November 1967	OO	7.4	51
39	3	The Ice Warriors	"Four"	Derek Martinus	Brian Hayles	2 December 1967	OO	7.3	51
39	3	The Ice Warriors	"Five"	Derek Martinus	Brian Hayles	9 December 1967	OO	8.0	50
39	3	The Ice Warriors	"Six"	Derek Martinus	Brian Hayles	16 December 1967	OO	7.5	51
In the distant future, set in an ice age, the crew at Brittanicus Base, largely run by a single computer system, struggle to control an ioniser, which they are using to slow the progress of glaciers rolling over Britain. An Ice Warrior, Varga, is found in the ice, thawed out, and revives more of his Warriors. The Ice Warriors come into the conflict with the base's crew members. Working together with Penley, a technician who dislikes the base's reliance on the computer, the Doctor is able to use the ioniser to destroy the Warriors' ship.
40	4	The Enemy of the World	"Episode 1"	Barry Letts	David Whitaker	23 December 1967	PP	6.8	50
40	4	The Enemy of the World	"Episode 2"	Barry Letts	David Whitaker	30 December 1967	PP	7.6	49
40	4	The Enemy of the World	"Episode 3"	Barry Letts	David Whitaker	6 January 1968	PP	7.1	48
40	4	The Enemy of the World	"Episode 4"	Barry Letts	David Whitaker	13 January 1968	PP	7.8	49
40	4	The Enemy of the World	"Episode 5"	Barry Letts	David Whitaker	20 January 1968	PP	6.9	49
40	4	The Enemy of the World	"Episode 6"	Barry Letts	David Whitaker	27 January 1968	PP	8.3	52
Arriving in Australia in 2018, The Doctor finds out he has an evil doppelgänger named Salamander, a dictator with aims of world domination who hides his true intent behind a kind public persona. The Doctor is convinced by a group of resistance fighters, led by a man named Kent, to pretend to be Salamander to find evidence of Salamander's crimes. During this period, the Doctor discovers Kent to be a former collaborator of Salamander, having trapped numerous researchers in a bunker so Salamander can use them to blackmail the world into surrender. Salamander kills Kent, with Kent destroying access to the bunker. Without allies, Salamander, injured from his defeat, pretends to be the Doctor and attempts to leave with Jamie and Victoria, but after a scuffle, the TARDIS takes off with the doors open, resulting in Salamander falling into the time vortex.
41	5	The Web of Fear	"Episode 1"	Douglas Camfield	Mervyn Haisman and Henry Lincoln	3 February 1968	QQ	7.2	54
41	5	The Web of Fear	"Episode 2"	Douglas Camfield	Mervyn Haisman and Henry Lincoln	10 February 1968	QQ	6.8	53
41	5	The Web of Fear	"Episode 3"^{†}	Douglas Camfield	Mervyn Haisman and Henry Lincoln	17 February 1968	QQ	7.0	51
41	5	The Web of Fear	"Episode 4"	Douglas Camfield	Mervyn Haisman and Henry Lincoln	24 February 1968	QQ	8.4	53
41	5	The Web of Fear	"Episode 5"	Douglas Camfield	Mervyn Haisman and Henry Lincoln	2 March 1968	QQ	8.0	55
41	5	The Web of Fear	"Episode 6"	Douglas Camfield	Mervyn Haisman and Henry Lincoln	9 March 1968	QQ	8.3	55
Following their incident with Salamander, the TARDIS crew land in the London Underground, where a web-like fungus has begun to spread. The group meets Travers again, now several decades older than the last time they saw him, with Travers revealing he accidentally reactivated a robot Yeti he had brought back from Tibet. The Doctor begins to work with the military, led by Colonel Lethbridge-Stewart, to try and find a way to stop the Intelligence. The Intelligence forces the Doctor to enter a machine that will drain his mind. Though the machine is successfully sabotaged by the Doctor's allies, the Doctor reveals he had planned to use the device to trap and drain the Intelligence, and the sabotage has allowed it to escape.
42	6	Fury from the Deep	"Episode 1"^{†}	Hugh David	Victor Pemberton	16 March 1968	RR	8.2	55
42	6	Fury from the Deep	"Episode 2"^{†}	Hugh David	Victor Pemberton	23 March 1968	RR	7.9	55
42	6	Fury from the Deep	"Episode 3"^{†}	Hugh David	Victor Pemberton	30 March 1968	RR	7.7	56
42	6	Fury from the Deep	"Episode 4"^{†}	Hugh David	Victor Pemberton	6 April 1968	RR	6.6	56
42	6	Fury from the Deep	"Episode 5"^{†}	Hugh David	Victor Pemberton	13 April 1968	RR	5.9	56
42	6	Fury from the Deep	"Episode 6"^{†}	Hugh David	Victor Pemberton	20 April 1968	RR	6.9	57
The TARDIS lands in the North Sea off the eastern coast of England in the 20th century. The Second Doctor, Jamie, and Victoria investigate a nearby beach near a gas refinery, where it's discovered that a seaweed-like parasite has taken control of the refinery's workers. Victoria's screaming is capable of destroying the seaweed creature, and by amplifying it, they are able to destroy it. Victoria subsequently elects to stay behind with a nearby family, departing from her travels in the TARDIS.
43	7	The Wheel in Space	"Episode 1"^{†}	Tristan DeVere Cole	David Whitaker and Kit Pedler (story)	27 April 1968	SS	7.2	57
43	7	The Wheel in Space	"Episode 2"^{†}	Tristan DeVere Cole	David Whitaker and Kit Pedler (story)	4 May 1968	SS	6.9	60
43	7	The Wheel in Space	"Episode 3"	Tristan DeVere Cole	David Whitaker and Kit Pedler (story)	11 May 1968	SS	7.5	55
43	7	The Wheel in Space	"Episode 4"^{†}	Tristan DeVere Cole	David Whitaker and Kit Pedler (story)	18 May 1968	SS	8.6	56
43	7	The Wheel in Space	"Episode 5"^{†}	Tristan DeVere Cole	David Whitaker and Kit Pedler (story)	25 May 1968	SS	6.8	57
43	7	The Wheel in Space	"Episode 6"	Tristan DeVere Cole	David Whitaker and Kit Pedler (story)	1 June 1968	SS	6.5	62
The Doctor and Jamie arrive on a deserted spaceship, The Silver Carrier, after the TARDIS's fluid links malfunction and they are marooned aboard the vessel. Their presence redirects the ship to a nearby vessel, the Wheel. The Cybermen are aboard The Silver Carrier, and aim to capture the Wheel. Working together with Zoe Heriot, a highly intelligent teenage prodigy, the group is able to thwart the Cybermen's plan. The Doctor repairs the fluid links, but Zoe stows away with them in the TARDIS. Though insistent on staying with them, the Doctor shows her visions of Daleks to warn her of the dangers that lie ahead if she travels with them.

^†: Episode is missing

== Production ==
=== Development ===
Innes Lloyd continued as the show's producer in The Tomb of the Cybermen, though had no great desire to continue in the role and thus sought to leave. He suggested Gerry Davis become producer, though Davis rejected his offer. Davis suggested to Lloyd that Peter Bryant take over as producer instead. Bryant had joined the production team in January 1967, having previously stepped in for Lloyd in the producer role, and had additionally worked as an assistant story editor with Davis and as an associate producer on The Faceless Ones (1967). Bryant ended up taking over Davis's story editor role in April 1967. Victor Pemberton was brought on as Bryant's assistant story editor. Bryant was enthusiastic about the role, but was unconfident in his skills as a producer; as a result, the final recording block of The Tomb of the Cybermen was given to Bryant as a "test run", with Pemberton acting as main story editor during this period. The story's success resulted in Bryant's position as producer being "virtually sealed". As the fifth season wore on, Bryant gained more creative input on the stories.

Tomb required little editing from Pemberton, though he attempted to add more atmosphere in places. Many rewrites were unable to be fulfilled due to Davis's departure from the production team to work on The First Lady, resulting in Pemberton undertaking the bulk of needed rewrites, with many concerning the character of Victoria. Initial story editing for subsequent serial The Abominable Snowmen was done by Pemberton, though the bulk of story edits were done by Bryant, who returned to his post during this story. Pemberton found himself unhappy with his new position, and desired to return to writing. Bryant took over his post once again after this serial, but shadowed Lloyd in preparation for taking over as producer at the end of the year. The Enemy of the World served as Lloyd's final story for the series, with Bryant taking over his role. Derrick Sherwin took over as assistant script editor. Sherwin was not particularly keen on being story editor, and thus contacted Terrance Dicks to serve as an uncredited story editor in 1968, with Sherwin planning to train and make Dicks his successor. Sherwin officially became the main story editor starting with The Web of Fear.

For The Tomb of the Cybermen, Sandra Reid served as costume designer while Gillian James handled makeup. This serial served as their final time working on the show, and Dorothea Wallace took over from Reid for the final two studio recording sessions due to Reid being hospitalised during production. Starting with The Abominable Snowmen, costume design work was largely handled by Martin Baugh, who took over from Reid's post, with Sylvia James operating makeup in Gillian's place. Baugh designed the costumes of several characters and creatures during this season, including the Yeti and the Ice Warriors.

=== Writing ===
==== Overall changes ====
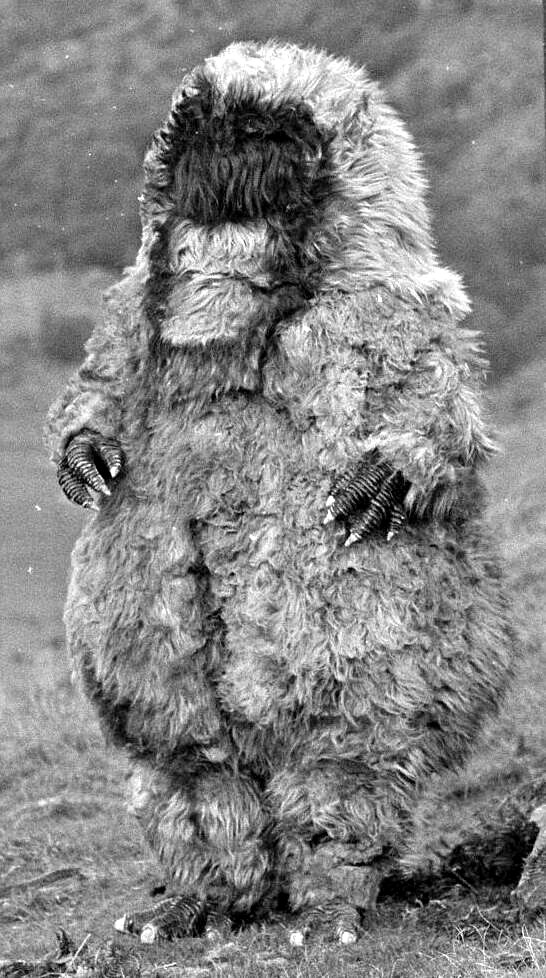
A Yeti as depicted during filming of The Abominable Snowmen. The Yeti were one of the new monsters introduced to the show during its fifth season.

The season was notable for repeatedly utilising the "Base Under Siege" story format, in which the characters, largely isolated on one set, were invaded by a given monster of the week. Additionally, there was a character type called the "Unstable Commander", often a figure of authority who provides "extra jeopardy" for the other characters. This story style is attributed to producer Lloyd, who used the format in the previous season's The Tenth Planet (1966), which introduced the recurring Cybermen as antagonists, and were used again later in that season for another Cyberman serial, The Moonbase (1967). Each story in the fifth season uses the Base Under Siege format in different capacities, though largely stick to a similar model, with the exception of The Enemy of the World. The story format ended up having a large effect on the show's story content for years afterward, even following Lloyd's departure.

The fifth season saw an increase in the emphasis on recurring "monsters" for the Doctor to fight. Lloyd hoped to find monsters to match the popularity of the Daleks, who were the only major recurring antagonist of Troughton's predecessor, William Hartnell, in the role of the Doctor. The season introduced the Ice Warriors and Yeti as part of this initiative, as well as further establish the Cybermen as antagonists following their two appearances in the prior season. Though attempts to find Dalek replacements had already been tried, such as with the titular monsters of The War Machines (1966), the need to find new monsters was further emphasised by the Daleks being written out of the series in the previous season's The Evil of the Daleks (1967) as a result of their creator, Terry Nation, seeking to pitch a Dalek television series in America.

Fury from the Deep also introduced an item known as the sonic screwdriver, representing a change in policy by the production team where the Doctor should use more "magical" gadgets. The screwdriver recurs throughout the rest of the series, being given several further functions as the show has progressed.

Several storylines were proposed but never produced: Roger Dixon's The King's Bedtime Story, in which the Doctor and his companions must perpetually enact a king's favourite story without changing it; Douglas Camfield and Robert Kitts's Operation Werewolf, wherein the Doctor arrives in Normandy before the D-Day landings to stop the Nazis from using a form of matter teleportation (later adapted by Big Finish Productions into an audio drama); and Brian Hayles's The Queen of Time, which would have seen the Doctor encounter an evil force named Hecuba, who was a relative of the Toymaker, another creation of Hayles's. In December 1967, Nation was approached regarding a serial potentially featuring both Daleks and Cybermen, but refused to allow the villains to appear together, though was open to the Daleks returning on their own if he was granted right of first refusal on any proposals.

==== Individual stories ====
The Tomb of the Cybermen was conceived of and written by Kit Pedler alongside Davis. The story was written to bring back the Cybermen, who had been highly popular antagonists in the prior season. Davis desired a story that would explore the Cybermen's origins, discussing a claustrophobic setting inspired by Davis and Pedler's deep fascination with Egyptian archaeology, which inspired the story's titular tombs. As with previous Cybermen stories, due to Pedler's lack of experience, Davis handled much of the scripting process, resulting in him having a large amount of input in the story and character development.

The following serial, The Abominable Snowmen, got its start after writer Henry Lincoln had spoken with Troughton, who expressed disappointment in the lack of Earth-bound stories in his first season as the Doctor. Lincoln met up with Mervyn Haisman to brainstorm such a concept and chose the stories of the yeti as a base for the story, with their master, the Great Intelligence, being conceived after the pair reasoned the Yeti would not be intelligent forces on their own. Troughton was receptive, as were Lloyd and Bryant. Bryant and the production team predicted the story would prove popular, and thus a sequel, The Web of Fear, was commissioned before The Abominable Snowmen had even aired, with this sequel airing later in the season. The Web of Fear was planned by Lincoln, Haisman, and Bryant to be set in the contemporary London Underground, wanting to bring the threat of alien invasion "closer to home."

The Ice Warriors was conceived of by Brian Hayles. In the spring of 1967, Bryant and Lloyd desired a new biped antagonist to complement the Daleks and the Cybermen. Hayles was interested in life on Mars and thought the idea of a race of reptilian humanoids was a plausible concept. As well as Hayles's interest in Mars, he was inspired by a story of a mammoth found preserved in a block of ice by the Berezovka River in 1901, which gave him the idea of an alien being revived after being similarly discovered. Hayles was commissioned in June 1967 to write the story. David Whitaker, who previously served as the show's story editor, returned to write The Enemy of the World. Though the fifth season was largely planned to be about monsters, Whitaker's story was determined to be the exception to the rule. It is the only story to lack any form of monster, and also the only one to not follow the Base Under Siege format, instead being a political thriller set in near future Earth.

Pemberton had previously submitted a script titled The Slide in 1964 for the show's second season, though was rejected by Whitaker. It was later commissioned as an unrelated seven part radio serial about parasitic mud taking over an English town. For the show's fifth season, Pemberton suggested to Bryant to adapt The Slide into a serial for Doctor Who, a proposal which was accepted. The villain was changed to natural gas, which was then being developed as a new fuel for Britain, with the creature taking the form of seaweed, which Pemberton disliked for its slimy texture. The setting was also changed to a gas refinery instead of a town. The climax of the story was changed to utilise Victoria's screaming, as it had become a major part of her character.

The production team was keen to bring the Cybermen back for a further story following the success of their first three serials. Plans for a new Cyberman story were temporarily halted in August and September 1967 by a minor dispute over the Cybermen's rights and royalties. Pedler eventually accepted a halfshare of royalties, and in September he began developing the serial with the production team. Due to Davis having left the series and Pedler's lack of experience with writing, Whitaker took over writing the serial using Pedler's notes. By the end of The Wheel in Space, Troughton felt the show was lacking in depth and needed new monsters, and was pleased to learn that next season's The Invasion, featuring the Cybermen, Lethbridge-Stewart, and Travers in a story set on contemporary Earth, was in the works and would serve to pilot a new format for the series.

=== Casting ===
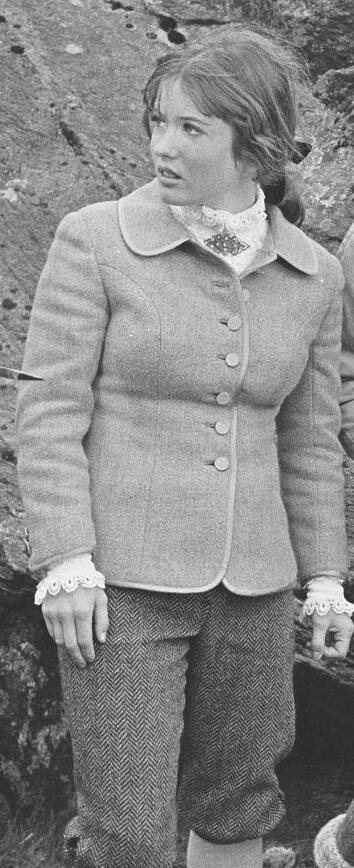
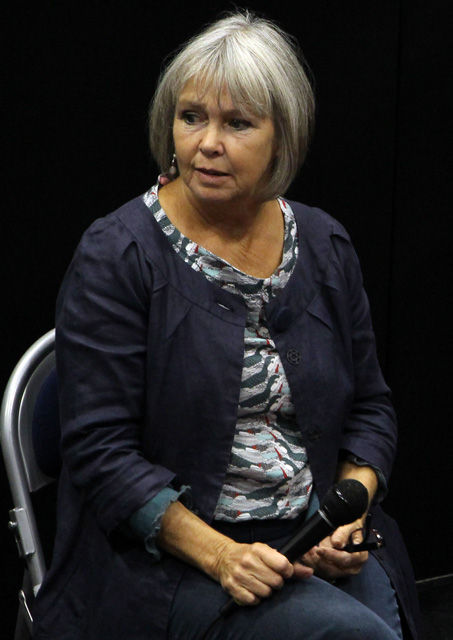
Watling as Waterfield during filming of The Abominable Snowmen (left) and Padbury as seen at a convention in 2015 (right). Watling would depart the series in Fury from the Deep, with Padbury joining as companion Zoe in the season's final serial.

Patrick Troughton and Frazer Hines reprised their main cast roles as the Second Doctor and Jamie McCrimmon from the prior season. Troughton also portrayed the dictator Salamander, marking the second time in the series an actor playing the Doctor portrayed another character in the same story, following William Hartnell in The Massacre (1966).

Deborah Watling portrays companion Victoria Waterfield in the season, following her introduction in the previous season's finale, The Evil of the Daleks. It had been hoped that Pauline Collins's character from The Faceless Ones (1967) could be brought on as a companion following the departure of Michael Craze and Anneke Wills as companions Ben and Polly. However, Collins declined to return, resulting in Victoria being shifted into a companion role for the season instead. Watling left the series in Fury from the Deep, stating that she had only intended to stay on the series for a year to avoid typecasting; Watling also stated that she left due to a lack of strong material given to the character. She gave the production team three months notice, and the production team began interviews to find an actress to play the next companion in January 1968. Watling later reprised her part onscreen in 1993's Dimensions in Time and in the 1995 spin-off direct-to-video film production Downtime.

Wendy Padbury is introduced in The Wheel in Space (1968), as Zoe Heriot. Sherwin envisaged a scientifically minded young woman to replace Victoria's role. Writer Peter Ling suggested the character be named Zoe. Interviews began in early January 1968, with Padbury's casting announced on 14 March 1968 alongside a special photoshoot, where several photographs were taken to serve as promotion for her debut in the serial's second episode.

==== Guest cast ====
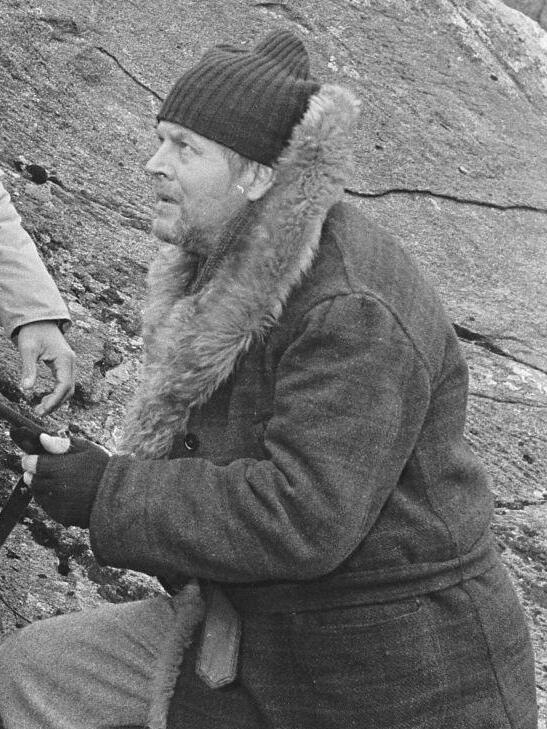
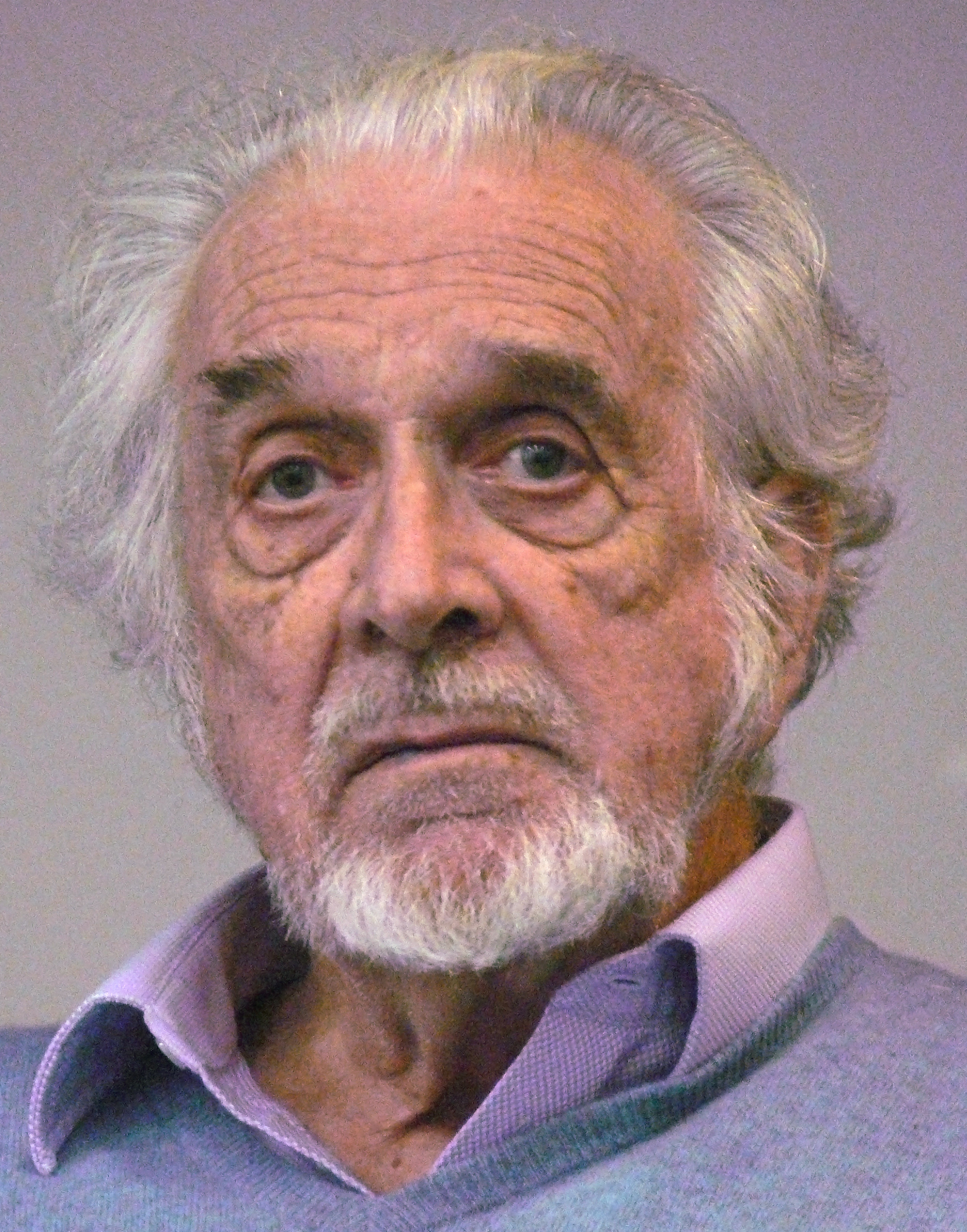
Actors Jack Watling (left) and Nicholas Courtney (right). Watling appears twice in his role of Professor Travers, while Courtney makes his first appearance in his recurring role as Lethbridge-Stewart.

Jack Watling, Deborah Watling's father, appears in a recurring role as the character Edward Travers. He makes his first and last appearances in the series in the serials The Abominable Snowmen and The Web of Fear, respectively. Watling went on to reprise his role of Travers thirty years in Downtime. Michael Kilgarriff also makes his first appearance in the series as the Cyber-Controller in The Tomb of the Cybermen. Kilgarriff later reprised the role eighteen years later in Attack of the Cybermen (1985). The Wheel in Space served as Peter Hawkins' final performance in the series, with Hawkins having served as the voice of the Daleks and Cybermen in every prior story featuring them.

The Web of Fear introduced Nicholas Courtney as Colonel Lethbridge-Stewart. Courtney had previously portrayed the character Bret Vyon in the 1965 serial The Daleks' Master Plan, and was originally supposed to play another character in the story, with David Langton portraying Lethbridge-Stewart. After Langton dropped out, Courtney took over as Lethbridge-Stewart. Courtney appeared as Lethbridge-Stewart again in the next season's The Invasion. Following The Invasion, Lethbridge-Stewart became a regular supporting character in numerous subsequent seasons in a main cast role, primarily alongside Jon Pertwee's Third Doctor.

=== Filming ===
Filming for the first serial, The Tomb of the Cybermen, was due to begin shortly after recording for The Evil of the Daleks, though the former serial was held over to season five in order to act as its opener. Scenes were inserted in the start of Tomb in order to allow for a reintroduction of the characters and setting, which was particularly important for Victoria's character due to her recent introduction. Morris Barry was invited back to direct the serial following his work on The Moonbase. Barry made few changes to the script, and largely aimed "to make it more violent and exciting." Filming began on 12 June 1967 with scenes shot at Gerrards Cross Quarry for shots depicting the exterior of the Cybermen's city. Filming was largely done at Ealing Studios from the 13th to the 16th, with scenes depicting the Cybermen's tombs shot at the BBC Television Centre Puppet Theatre on the 19th. Remaining filming was done at Lime Grove Studios from 1 July to 22 July.

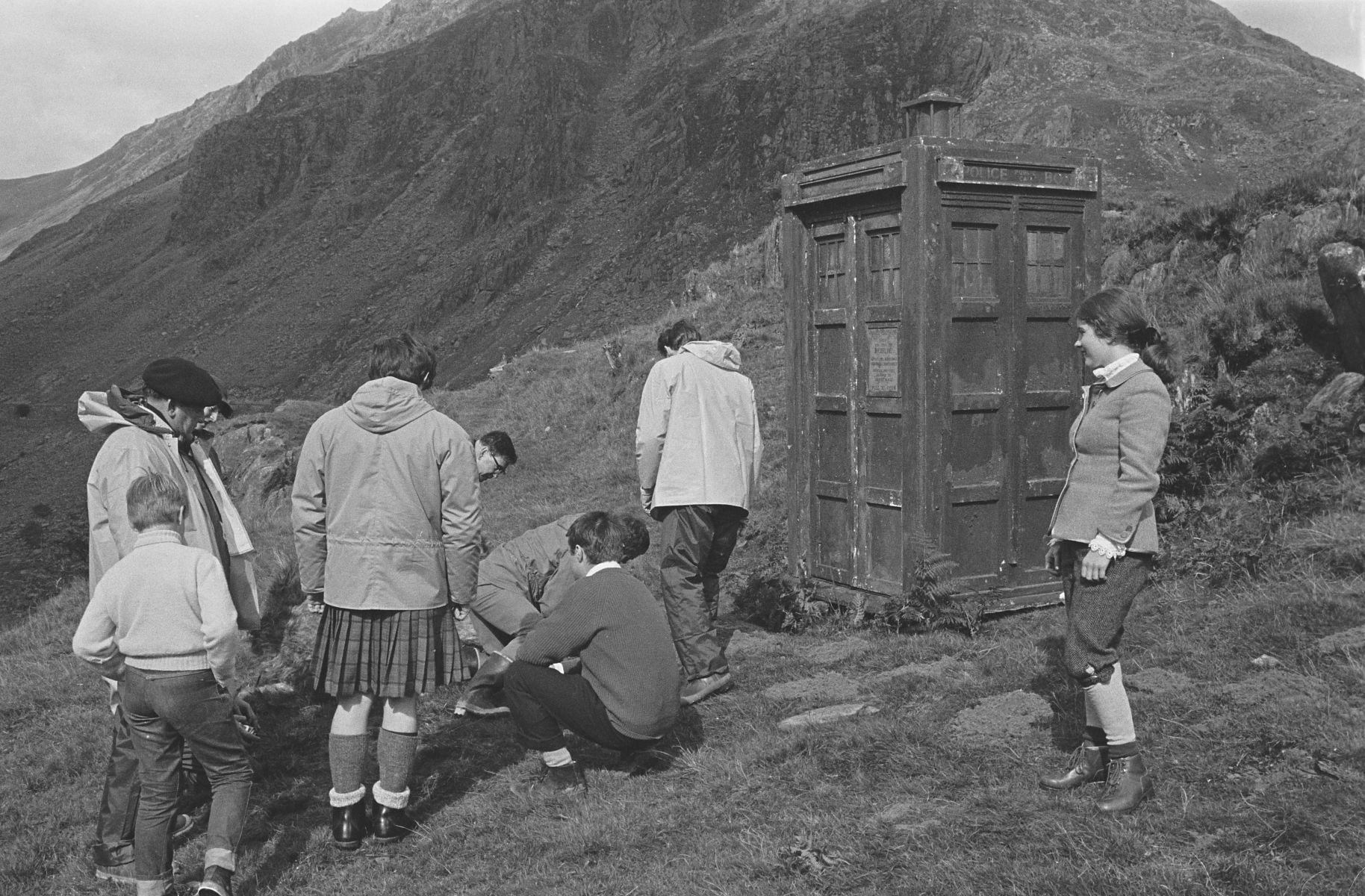
The TARDIS on location during filming of The Abominable Snowmen at Snowdonia

The Abominable Snowmen was initially planned to be the fifth season opener due to its large amount of location work, with production starting over the summer of 1967. The serial was directed by Gerald Blake, who had not previously worked on Doctor Who before, though he had previously been planned to direct for the show back in 1964 for a scrapped story. Filming began on 23 August 1967, with location filming was done from 4 to 9 September 1967. The North Wales mountain pass at Nant Ffrancon in Snowdonia doubled as Tibet for the filming of this serial. This six day shoot was, at the time, the longest on-location shoot for the series. The rest of the filming was shot in studio at the Ealing Studios and Lime Grove Studios, with filming wrapping on 14 October 1967.

The Ice Warriors was considered to be the first story in the season, but was subsequently shifted to follow The Abominable Snowmen. Derek Martinus directed the story, though reluctantly, since he had previously directed numerous serials and wished to move away from the show, though he later claimed The Ice Warriors to be his favorite to direct for because of the serial's guest cast. Filming for the serial was conducted at Ealing Film Studios from 25 September 1967 to 2 October 1967, with production shifting to Lime Grove from 21 October to 25 November when filming wrapped.

Barry Letts directed The Enemy of the World, with this story being his first assignment on the programme, though he had previously tried to write for the series back in 1966. Letts later served as the show's producer throughout the era of Troughton's successor, Jon Pertwee. Sherwin worked closely with Letts during filming to add more action to the story, as it was largely dialogue heavy. Location filming took place at Climping Beach near Littlehampton, West Sussex. For scenes at the beach, a helicopter and hovercraft were hired and built, respectively. Filming at the beach took place from 5 November to 8 November. Scenes were filmed at the Villiers House in Ealing for scenes involving guards on a fire escape on the 9th, with filming at Walpole Park in Ealing used for scenes depicting Jamie in a park the same day. The rest of filming was done at Ealing Film Studios from the 10th to the 13th of November, and at Lime Grove from 2 December 1967 to 6 January 1968. Hines and Watling were on break during the filming of The Enemy of the World's fourth episode, and thus did not appear in the episode. Following this story, Letts saw Troughton's exhaustion regarding filming multiple stories simultaneously and suggested Doctor Who's episode count should be trimmed to 26 episodes to allow for an extra week of recording, which removed the need for stories to be filmed simultaneously. This was taken into effect for the show's sixth season.

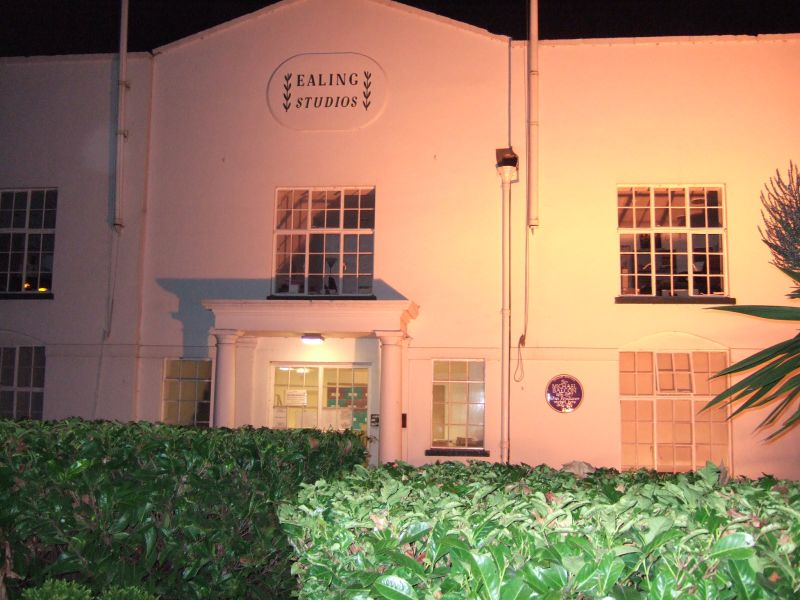
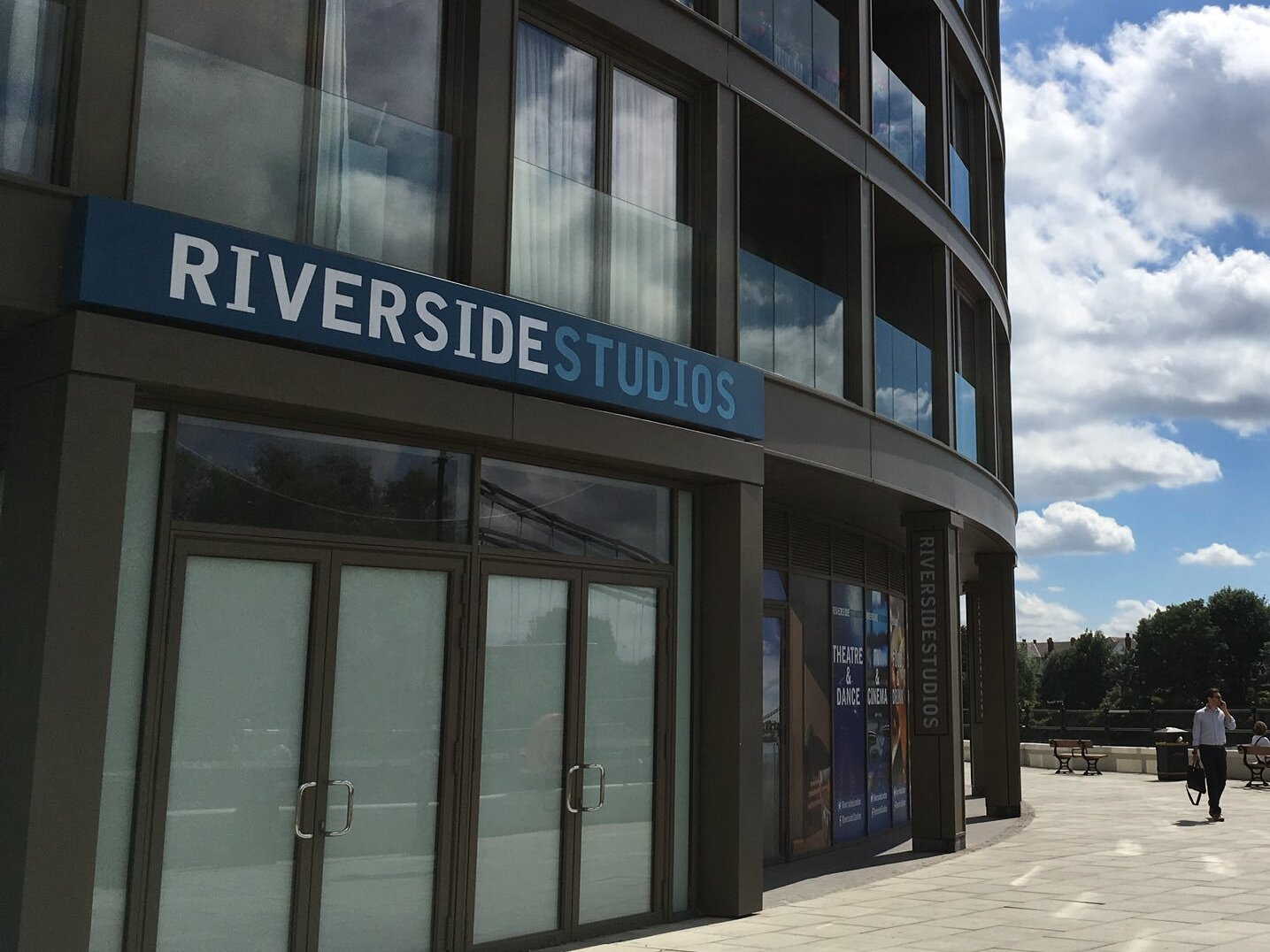
Ealing Studios (pictured in 2008, left) and Riverside Studios (pictured in 2018, right) were where much of season five was filmed.

The Web of Fear was originally planned to be the last story in the season, though the order was changed so that the story planned to come before it, Fury from the Deep, came after Web so the latter serial could capitalise off of the Yeti's popularity. Director Douglas Camfield was chosen for The Web of Fear, with Camfield having served as a production assistant and director during several stories starring Troughton's predecessor, William Hartnell. The production team originally planned to film in the real London Underground, though due to negotiations with officials falling through, designer David Myerscough-Jones re-created the tunnels at the BBC studios, which were done in such detail that Underground officials reportedly contacted the BBC to accuse them of illegally filming there. Much of filming took place at the sets at Ealing Studios from December 1967 to January 1968. Model filming took place on 8 January, with further filming taking place at a variety of locations, such as Lime Grove, until 17 February.

Hugh David was put in charge of directing Fury from the Deep, having previously directed The Highlanders (1966). Filming for Fury from the Deep began at the cliffs near Botany Bay, Kent on 4 February 1968, running until the 6th. Filming continued at Ealing from the 7th to the 9th, with further filming done there on the 4th to 6th of March. Shots were filmed at Denham Aerodrome on the 12th. The rest of filming was done at Lime Grove from 24 February to 23 March, with filming wrapping with scenes shot at the Television Centre on 29 March.

The Wheel in Space was directed by Tristan de Vere Cole, who was a relatively new director who had previously served as a production assistant on The Gunfighters (1966). de Vere Cole enjoyed working with Pedler and Whitaker on the serial, though Bryant disapproved of this and some of the changes made to the script by de Vere Cole. de Vere Cole also changed the names of many characters to reflect more ethnicities than the previous names did. Filming began in March 1968 with the effects sequences in Ealing Film Studios. Recording concluded on 10 May at Riverside Studios, Studio 1.The second episode was written to accommodate Troughton's scheduled holiday. As a result, the Doctor is unconscious during the episode and played by body double Chris Jeffries.

== Release ==
=== Promotion ===
Doctor Who was one of the shows promoted in bulletins regarding the BBC's autumn drama productions, which was covered by The Daily Telegraph and Daily Express in August 1968. Radio Times featured the Cybermen from The Tomb of the Cybermen on its cover on 31 August, and a trailer for the serial was produced which ended with a shot of a Cyberman from the first story coming into view. Watling was the subject of a photo feature in the Daily Mirror on 7 October to promote the second episode of The Abominable Snowmen, with Troughton featuring with a Yeti in the October edition of BBC magazine Ariel. A short trailer to promote The Ice Warriors was released shortly after the airing of The Abominable Snowmen's sixth episode. A half-page feature was run in Radio Times on 9 November, while the Daily Mirror ran an item on the 11th focusing on Bernard Bresslaw, who portrayed Ice Warrior Varga in the serial. Hayles appeared on Midlands Today to promote the serial on 16 November, while Radio Times ran a short piece regarding composer Dudley Simpson's music to promote the second episode. The week later, a similar item was run focusing on Peter Barkworth, who also appeared in the serial. On 27 November, Blue Peter held a competition for fans of Doctor Who to design a monster that could beat the Daleks, with Troughton himself judging entries. This was set to tie into an exhibition of the show's monsters, and the competition received newspaper coverage and garnered a quarter of a million submissions. It became one of the most popular contests run by the series. The three winners were revealed on 14 December, with Troughton posing with the winners and their constructed monsters. Newspapers covered the winners, including the Daily Sketch, who included a sketch of one of the winners, a creature with a giant eye named the Hypnotron, getting eye surgery.

On 16 December, a trailer for The Enemy of the World was broadcast after the sixth episode of The Ice Warriors. Radio Times ran numerous promotional pieces on the story, including a cover photo featuring a promotional shot of Troughton from The Ice Warriors. The monster exhibition opened at Empire Hall Olympia on 27 December, and featured monsters such as the Fungoid and Mire Beast from The Chase (1965), a Varga Plant from "Mission to the Unknown" (1965), a Rill from Galaxy 4 (1965) and Cybermen, a Dalek, Ice Warrior, and Yeti. A BBC2 documentary for the series Whicker's World aired on 27 January 1968 and featured an interview with Terry Nation and an appearance by a Yeti stalking host Alan Whicker through Highgate Cemetery. A trailer for The Web of Fear was broadcast shortly after the sixth episode of The Enemy of the World on 27 January 1968. Several pieces in Radio Times, including a full page preview on 1 February and interviews with cast members. London Transport Magazine covered Myerscough-Jone's set design for the London Underground in the serial. A trailer for Fury from the Deep after the broadcast of episode six of The Web of Fear on 9 March. Radio Times also carried a small feature on the story on 14 March. BBC1's viewer feedback programme Talkback covered the Cybermen's return in The Wheel in Space on 14 April, discussing the violence in their prior story The Tomb of the Cybermen. A trailer for episode one of The Wheel in Space was broadcast on 20 April. Radio Times included several promotional pieces on the serial. Daily Mirror ran a feature on 18 May discussing behind the scenes information regarding the show's monsters, Baugh, and visual effects designer Bernard Wilkie.

=== Broadcast ===
The entire season was broadcast from 2 September 1967, starting with the first episode of The Tomb of the Cybermen, to 1 June 1968 with the final episode of The Wheel in Space. Each of the stories in the season were broadcast across six parts, except for The Tomb of the Cybermen, which was broadcast across four parts. Following the broadcast of The Wheel in Space, a rerun of The Evil of the Daleks was shown over the following weeks to bridge the summer gap between the fifth and sixth seasons. Footage from The Evil of the Daleks is displayed on the TARDIS's scanner in the final moments of The Wheel in Space to link the rerun to in-universe events.

Several serials were sold overseas in the late 1960s and early 1970s, including to Australia, Hong Kong, Singapore, Zambia, Gibraltar, Nigeria, and New Zealand. Until the establishment of the Film and Videotape Library in 1978, the BBC wiped and reused the videotapes of old programmes deemed to hold no further commercial value. The Tomb of the Cybermen's 405-line tapes were wiped in September 1969, though 16mm film copies were offered for sale until 1974 when all remaining copies were junked. The Abominable Snowmen's were cleared for wiping in July 1969, with all episodes wiped by September. The remaining 16mm copies were offered for sale until 1974, and were eventually destroyed by 1978. The Ice Warriors was ordered to have its 405-line tapes destroyed in 1969, with all of its parts being destroyed by October of that year. Its 16mm copies were offered for sale until 1974, and were destroyed by 1978. The Enemy of the World's tapes were cleared for wiping in July 1969, and were all destroyed by October. All of the 16mm recordings were destroyed by 1974 except for Episode 3, which was retained by the BBC as an example of the output of the fifth season, alongside The Wheel in Space's sixth part. The Web of Fear was cleared for wiping in July 1969, and was entirely wiped by September. In 1974, Fury from the Deep's 625-line tapes were wiped, with its 16 mm film copies junked. It was the final story from the series to be wiped, and it is the only story from the fifth season serial for which no episodes are held in the BBC's archives. The Wheel in Space was still marketed by 1974, but by this point only the 35mm film copy of episode six was retained in the archives.

The Tomb of the Cybermen and The Enemy of the World are the only two stories to exist in their entirety from season five in the BBC's archives. All four parts of The Tomb of the Cybermen were later recovered in Hong Kong in 1992, and the remaining five missing episodes of The Enemy of the World were discovered in October 2013 in a television relay station in Jos, Nigeria. The Abominable Snowmen's second episode was returned in 1982 by a private collector after a call for missing episodes of the show was put out, with the other five episodes remaining missing; an animated reconstruction of the story, using audio of the original broadcast recorded by fans, released in 2022. In August 1988, recordings of the first, fourth, fifth, and sixth episodes of The Ice Warriors were recovered from a cupboard in Villiers House in Ealing while BBC Enterprises was in the process of moving out of the building. Episodes two and three remain missing, and an animated reconstruction was released in 2013. In 1978, The Web of Fear's first episode was discovered by chance in a rack of film reels returned from Hong Kong. The serial's remaining episodes were discovered alongside The Enemy of the World's in 2013, though the third episode was not returned and is believed to have been lost "en route". An animated reconstruction of the missing third episode was released in 2021. Episode three of The Wheel in Space was recovered in 1984 from a private collector in Southampton, with all other episodes of the serial remaining missing.

=== Home media ===
==== VHS releases ====
Season	Story no.	Serial name	Duration	Release date		
Season	Story no.	Serial name	Duration	UK	Australia	USA / Canada
5	37	The Tomb of the Cybermen	4 × 25 min.	5 May 1992	May 1992	8 October 1992
5	38, 40	The Troughton Years; The Abominable Snowmen (Note: Episode 2); The Enemy of the World (Note: Episode 3)	2 × 25 min.	3 July 1991	March 1992	16 January 1992
5	39	The Ice Warriors (Note: Includes The Missing Years)	4 × 25 min. 1 × 10 min. (Note: Reconstruction of missing episodes 2 & 3)	2 November 1998	December 1998	September 1999
5	41	The Reign of Terror Set; The Web of Fear (Note: Episode 1 plus censor clips from episodes 2, 4, and 5)	1 × 25 min.	24 November 2003	December 2003	7 October 2003
5	43	Cybermen: The Early Years; The Wheel in Space (Note: Episodes 3 & 6)	4 × 25 min.	6 July 1992	March 1993	10 March 1993

==== DVD and Blu-ray releases ====
All releases are for DVD unless otherwise indicated:

- ^{(D)} indicates a DVD release for a specific date
- ^{(D,B)} indicates a simultaneous DVD and Blu-ray release

Season	Story no.	Serial name	Duration	Release date		
Season	Story no.	Serial name	Duration	R2	R4	R1
5	37	The Tomb of the Cybermen	4 × 25 min.	14 January 2002	28 March 2002	6 August 2002
5	37	The Tomb of the Cybermen (Special Edition) (Note: Only available as part of the Revisitations 3 box set in Regions 2 and 4. Only available individually in Region 1.)	4 × 25 min.	13 February 2012	1 March 2012	13 March 2012
5	38	The Abominable Snowmen (Note: All six episodes animated (colour and black and white versions), remastered Episode 2 and "tele-snap" reconstructions)	6 × 25 min.	5 September 2022^{(D,B)}	2 November 2022 ^{(D,B)}	6 December 2022 ^{(D,B)}
5	38, 40, 41, 43	Lost in Time, Volume 2 The Abominable Snowmen (Note: Episode 2 of 6); The Enemy of the World (Note: Episode 3 of 6); The Web of Fear (Note: Episode 1 of 6); The Wheel in Space (Note: Episodes 3 and 6 of 6)	5 × 25 min.	1 November 2004 (Note: Re-released in slimmer packaging in late 2016)	2 December 2004 (Note: Re-released in slimmer packaging in July 2010)	2 November 2004
5	39	The Ice Warriors (Note: Episodes 1 and 4–6 of 6, with both animated full and "tele-snap" partial reconstructions of episodes 2 and 3)	6 × 25 min.	26 August 2013	28 August 2013	17 September 2013
5	40	The Enemy of the World	6 × 25 min.	25 November 2013	27 November 2013	10 December 2013 (Note: 20 May 2014 in the United States)
5	40	The Enemy of the World (Special Edition)	6 × 25 min.	26 March 2018	8 August 2018	—N/a
5	41	The Web of Fear (Note: Episodes 1–2 and 4–6 of 6, with a "tele-snap" reconstruction of episode 3)	6 × 25 min.	24 February 2014	26 February 2014	22 April 2014
5	41	The Web of Fear (Special Edition) (Note: Episodes 1–2 and 4–6 of 6, with an animated reconstruction of episode 3)	6 × 25 min.	16 August 2021 ^{(D,B)}	22 September 2021 ^{(D,B)}	1 February 2022
5	42	Fury From the Deep (Note: All six episodes animated)	6 × 25 min.	14 September 2020 ^{(D,B)}	11 November 2020 ^{(D,B)}	20 April 2021

=== Books ===
Season	Story no.	Library no. (Note: Number in Target's Doctor Who Library, if applicable)	Novelisation title	Author	Hardcover release date (Note: Published by Target's parent companies (Allen Wingate, W. H. Allen, BBC Books) unless otherwise indicated)	Paperback release date (Note: Published by Target Books (or by BBC Books under the Target Collection umbrella) unless otherwise indicated)	Audiobook	
Season	Story no.	Library no.	Novelisation title	Author	Hardcover release date	Paperback release date	Release date (Note: Unabridged from BBC Audio / AudioGo unless otherwise indicated)	Narrator
5	037	66	Doctor Who and the Tomb of the Cybermen	Gerry Davis	18 May 1978		7 March 2013	Michael Kilgarriff (Note: Cyberman voices performed by Nicholas Briggs)
5	038	1	Doctor Who and the Abominable Snowmen	Terrance Dicks	17 January 1985	21 November 1974	24 March 2009	David Troughton
5	039	33	Doctor Who and the Ice Warriors	Brian Hayles	18 March 1976		7 January 2010	Frazer Hines
5	040	24	Doctor Who and the Enemy of the World	Ian Marter	16 April 1981		4 July 2019	David Troughton
5	041	72	Doctor Who and the Web of Fear	Terrance Dicks	19 August 1976		3 August 2017	David Troughton
5	042	110	Fury from the Deep	Victor Pemberton	22 May 1986	16 October 1986	7 July 2011	David Troughton
5	043	130	The Wheel in Space	Terrance Dicks	17 March 1988	18 August 1988	5 August 2021	David Troughton

== Reception ==
=== Ratings ===
In comparison to his predecessor, Troughton's tenure as the Doctor saw a marked increase in viewership, with the fifth season in particular averaging 7.2 million viewers for each episode, and did not receive much fluctuation in terms of viewership. Season opener The Tomb of the Cybermen attained solid viewing figures, with the number of viewers rising from 6.0 to 7.4 million by the time of its conclusion. Viewing figures were especially solid compared to fourth season opener The Smugglers (1966), though maintained average audience appreciation figures ranging from 49 to 53. The serial's fourth part was the second highest rated children's programme of that month. Ratings for The Abominable Snowmen were similar, with viewership gradually increasing as the weather grew colder outside. Its second episode received the lowest figures of the serial with 6 million viewers, with its highest being its final episode with figures of 7.4 million. It received audience appreciation scores ranging from 50-52. The Ice Warriors saw a slight improvement, with its first episode receiving its lowest figures of 6.7 million viewers and its fifth receiving its highest of 8 million viewers; it received acceptable audience appreciation scores similar to the prior serial.

The Enemy of the World was a slight improvement on prior serials, with episode six attaining the highest viewing figures of the season by that point with 8.3 million viewers. The serial received appreciation scores ranging from 48 to 52. The Web of Fear saw a further rise in viewing figures, and the serial's sixth episode featured in the Top 40 programmes for the week. The serial's lowest rated episode was the second, with 6.8 million viewers, with its highest being the fifth with 8.4 million viewers. Appreciation scores ranged from 51 to 55. Fury from the Deep was a slight step down from The Web of Fear, though audience scores were on the up, averaging 55 to 57. The fifth episode was the lowest viewed, garnering 5.9 million viewers, with episode one being the highest with 8.2 million viewers. The Wheel in Space's lowest viewing figure was 6.5 million viewers in its sixth episode, while its highest was viewership of 8.6 million for its fourth episode. Its sixth episode saw the highest appreciation score since the first episode of The Dalek Invasion of Earth (1964) four years earlier, with the episode scoring a rating of 62. The rest of the serial's scores ranged from 55 to 60.

=== Critical response ===
Since its airing, the fifth season of the show has been met with a positive response. Critic John Kenneth Muir regarded the season as being one of the best of the show's original run despite the large amount of missing episodes, writing that it "may have been the most inventive and exciting time the series ever saw". Muir regarded Troughton and Hines as strong presences, The Tomb of the Cybermen as a highlight story, and the important introductions of the recurring Yeti and Ice Warriors to the series as some of its strengths. Some of the season's stories have been cited by critics as being some of the best and most iconic in the show's history, including The Tomb of the Cybermen The Abominable Snowmen, and The Web of Fear. Andrew Blair of Den of Geek stated that the season's Base Under Siege format "shaped a lot of people's view on Doctor Who", and in retrospect the season would popularly be known as the "season of monsters" by fans due to its numerous popular antagonists, such as the newly introduced Ice Warriors and Yeti. The emphasis on monsters resulted in Troughton's era of the show being regarded as one of the most terrifying eras of the show by viewers of the time, particularly younger viewers.

In a variety of fan-voted popularity polls run by Doctor Who Magazine, The Tomb of the Cybermen, The Abominable Snowmen, The Web of Fear, and Fury from the Deep have consistently ranked in the top one hundred stories across the entire show, with Tomb and Web both being ranked in the ten best stories of all-time in the first series wide poll in 1998. The Ice Warriors ranked within the top 30 in the 1998 poll, before dropping to 141st place by the time of a poll conducted in 2014. The Enemy of the World ranked below the top 100 until 2014's poll, where it rose to 56th place. The Wheel in Space has consistently placed below the top 100 in these polls. In a 2023 poll, The Tomb of the Cybermen, The Abominable Snowmen, The Web of Fear, The Enemy of the World, and Fury from the Deep were voted to be among the ten best stories of Troughton's tenure as the Doctor, with Tomb ranking second overall and Web placing fifth.

The Tomb of the Cybermen has received positive responses since its release, though shortly after release it received criticism for being too violent. Muir described the story as being perhaps the best serial in the show's original run. However, several critics have regarded the story as being racially insensitive in its depiction of the character Toberman. The Abominable Snowmen is regarded as a classic serial from the show and is well-liked by fans, with Muir noting the Yeti as a well thought out and effective antagonist that had a lasting influence in the series. The Ice Warriors received largely positive commentary from critics, who liked the setting and guest performances, though some criticised aspects of the story, such as the story's extensive focus on the subplot involving the base's computer. The Enemy of the World received largely positive responses from critics, though Troughton's double performance as the Doctor and Salamander received mixed responses.

The Web of Fear has been described as a classic story in the series by critics, with Muir noting the important introduction of Lethbridge-Stewart to the series during this serial. The usage of the Yeti in a familiar space to contemporary viewers, the London Underground, was said to have contributed to the serial's success, though retrospective critics felt the Yeti were not particularly intimidating antagonists when not obscured by darkness. Critics generally were mixed on Fury from the Deep, though retrospective responses were largely positive. Mark Wright stated that the serial was an early example of using an inanimate everyday object as the villain of a Doctor Who story, which was later used to great effect with subsequent antagonists, such as the Autons and Weeping Angels. The Wheel in Space saw generally mixed responses from viewers, who praised Troughton and Hines' performance, though the Cybermen and the series as a whole were by this point seen as repetitive. Critics were similarly mixed to negative in regard to the story, though Zoe's introduction received positive responses.
