= The Enemy of the World =

1967–68 Doctor Who serial

040 – The Enemy of the World
- Doctor Who serial
- Patrick Troughton as the Doctor (right) and the murderous dictator Salamander (left)

Cast
- Doctor: Patrick Troughton – Second Doctor
- Companions: Frazer Hines – Jamie McCrimmon; Deborah Watling – Victoria Waterfield
- Others: Patrick Troughton – Salamander; Bill Kerr – Giles Kent; Mary Peach – Astrid Ferrier; Colin Douglas – Donald Bruce; George Pravda – Denes; David Nettheim – Fedorin; Milton Johns – Benik; Henry Stamper – Anton; Rhys McConnochie – Rod; Simon Cain – Curly; Carmen Munroe – Fariah; Reg Lye – Griffin the Chef; Christopher Burgess – Swann; Adam Verney – Colin; Margaret Hickey – Mary; Gordon Faith, Elliott Cairnes – Guard Captains; Bill Lyons, Bob Anderson, William McGuirk, Dibbs Mather – Guards; Andrew Staines – Sergeant to Benik

Production
- Directed by: Barry Letts
- Written by: David Whitaker
- Script editor: Peter Bryant
- Produced by: Innes Lloyd
- Executive producer: None
- Music by: None (Note: This serial uses stock music composed by Béla Bartók)
- Production code: PP
- Series: Season 5
- Running time: 6 episodes, 25 minutes each
- First broadcast: 23 December 1967
- Last broadcast: 27 January 1968

Chronology
← Preceded by The Ice Warriors	Followed by → The Web of Fear

The Enemy of the World is the fourth serial of the fifth season of the British science fiction television series Doctor Who, which originally aired in six weekly parts from 23 December 1967 to 27 January 1968.

In the serial, set across Australia and Hungary in 2018, the Doctor (Patrick Troughton) and his travelling companions Jamie McCrimmon (Frazer Hines) and Victoria Waterfield (Deborah Watling) work with the spies Giles Kent (Bill Kerr) and Astrid Ferrier (Mary Peach) to expose the Doctor's doppelgänger Salamander (Troughton) for creating natural disasters across Earth.

The Enemy of the World is the only serial in season 5 which features no monsters and eschews the "base-under-siege" story structure.

All master tapes for the serial were wiped due to BBC archival policy, and for over thirty years only Episode 3 existed in the BBC's archives. In October 2013, the BBC announced that 16mm prints of the remaining five episodes had been found in Nigeria. The Enemy of the World has received mixed reviews from critics, and has been positively re-evaluated by fans since its re-discovery.

== Plot ==
The Second Doctor (Patrick Troughton) and his companions Jamie McCrimmon (Frazer Hines) and Victoria Waterfield (Deborah Watling) are enjoying themselves on a beach in 2018 Australia when the Doctor is subject to an assassination attempt. A spy named Astrid Ferrier (Mary Peach) rescues the trio by helicopter and takes them to her boss Giles Kent (Bill Kerr). The Doctor learns he is a physical double of ruthless megalomaniac Salamander (also portrayed by Troughton). Kent's home is surrounded by troops led by Salamander's security chief Donald Bruce (Colin Douglas). The Doctor is persuaded to impersonate Salamander to save his companions and gather more information.

Jamie and Victoria infiltrate Salamander's palace in Hungary and befriend Fariah (Carmen Munroe), Salamander's food taster, hoping to gather evidence against Salamander. Fariah reveals she was blackmailed into her role. Jamie causes a diversion to facilitate an unsuccessful rescue attempt on Denes (George Pravda) by Astrid. Denes is shot dead. Though Astrid escapes, Jamie and Victoria are arrested.

Salamander discovers he is being impersonated and returns to his research station to confront the impostor. Fariah tells the Doctor that Jamie and Victoria are prisoners in the Research Centre. Before they can act, the building is raided by Salamander's deputy Benik (Milton Johns) and his troops. Fariah is killed and the others escape.

It is revealed that Salamander has trapped a group of scientists below the Research Centre and is using their knowledge to create natural disasters to destabilise the world and increase his influence.

Bruce and the Doctor release Jamie and Victoria from the centre, and the Doctor sends them back to the TARDIS. In the records room, Kent, believing the Doctor to be Salamander, accidentally reveals that they conspired together to trap the scientists below ground. Kent is further incriminated by the scientists escaping the bunker. Kent flees into the cave system beyond the Records Room, where he encounters the real Salamander, who shoots him in the back. As he falls, Kent sets off a set of explosives that destroys access to the bunker and damages the research centre.

Salamander takes refuge in the TARDIS, pretending to be the Doctor. The real Doctor arrives and a physical altercation ensues. In a panic, Salamander pulls the dematerialisation switch while the TARDIS doors are still open, and falls out into the time vortex.

== Production ==
=== Development ===
This was the last story to be produced under the aegis of Doctor Who creator Sydney Newman, who left his position as Head of Drama at the BBC upon the expiration of his contract at the end of 1967. The four key production roles for this story were all taken by men heavily involved in the development of Doctor Who. Author David Whitaker had been the show's first script editor; Barry Letts, directing the show for the first time, later became the show's producer (for the majority of the Jon Pertwee era), executive producer, and occasional script writer; script editor Peter Bryant became the show's producer from the next story; Innes Lloyd was the show's current producer, but left after this story.

Much like the First Doctor serial The Massacre of St Bartholomew's Eve (1966), this serial was influenced by the lead actor's desire to play roles other than the Doctor. Initially, it was planned that Troughton's two characters would meet more than once, but due to the technical complexity, there was eventually only the one confrontation scene, at the story's climax (utilising editing and a split-screen technique).

The Enemy of the World is the only serial in season 5 which lacks a "monster" (e.g. the Yeti or Cybermen) as the villain and does not follow the "base under siege" structure.

=== Filming and editing ===
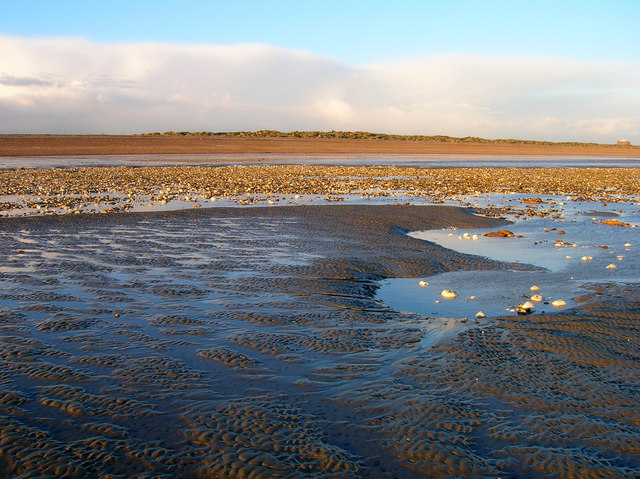
Climping Beach stood in for the Australian coast.

Much of the location filming took place at Climping Beach by Littlehampton, West Sussex from 5 to 8 November 1967. It was Troughton's idea that the Doctor should strip to his long johns when exploring the beach. The helicopter was hired from Bristow Helicopters; this was the first time a helicopter was used in Doctor Who. The BBC-owned Villiers House in Ealing stood in for Kent's office and was filmed on 9 and 10 November. Interior TARDIS scenes, including the meeting of the Doctor and Salamander in Episode 6, Salamander's speech that the characters view in Episode 1, and model filming took place 10-13 November. The rest of the taping took place weekly on Saturdays from 2 December 1967 to 6 January 1968.

Barry Letts planned six split-screen shots showcasing Salamander and the Doctor. He called for a matte box to mask half of the camera lens, having read about the technique used for old Hollywood films. The film was rewound after the first take and Troughton was then filmed in his other costume. However, after the first such shot, the camera jammed, and no more split-screen takes were filmed. Later, Letts mentioned this to Derek Martinus, director of the preceding story, who brought Letts up to date with the contemporary technology of filming normally then using an optical printer to combine the material.

Due to British television's shift from 405-line technology to 625-line, in preparation for colour transmissions, going into effect for all BBC shows from 1 January 1968, it was long believed that the switch-over for Doctor Who from 405 lines to 625 came as of Episode 3 of this serial; however, upon the recovery of the other five episodes of the serial, it was discovered that Episodes 1 and 2 were in fact made at 625 lines prior to the official switchover. The now-disproved notion of the switch-over occurring at Episode 3 was most likely due to an error in documentation.

The editing of the serial was plagued by several issues. 45 minutes of footage shot for Episode 1 were lost because the tape had been reversed, causing a backlog that led to an eleven-hour editing session to finish Episodes 4 and 5 on 1 January 1968.

=== Cast notes ===
Frazer Hines and Deborah Watling did not appear in episode 4, as they were on holiday. Many of The Enemy of the World's cast reappeared in later Doctor Who stories. Milton Johns appeared in The Android Invasion (1975) as Guy Crayford and The Invasion of Time (1978) as Castellan Kelner. Colin Douglas played Reuben the lightkeeper (as well as voicing the Rutan scout) in the 1977 serial Horror of Fang Rock. George Pravda later appeared in The Mutants (1972) as Jaeger and The Deadly Assassin (1976) as Castellan Spandrell.

== Broadcast and reception ==
Episode	Title	Run time	Original release date	UK viewers (millions)	Appreciation Index
1	"Episode 1"	23:45	23 December 1967	6.8	50
2	"Episode 2"	23:48	30 December 1967	7.6	49
3	"Episode 3"	23:05	6 January 1968	7.1	48
4	"Episode 4"	23:46	13 January 1968	7.8	49
5	"Episode 5"	24:22	20 January 1968	6.9	49
6	"Episode 6"	21:41	27 January 1968	8.3	52

The Enemy of the World was broadcast on BBC1 in six weekly parts from 23 December 1967 to 27 January 1968. The serial saw an improvement in ratings for the season, particularly the final episode, whose 8.3 million viewers were the best of the season so far. It was sold abroad for broadcast in Australia, Hong Kong, Singapore, New Zealand, Gibraltar, Zambia, and Nigeria.

=== Archival status ===
On 21 July 1969, the videotapes for Episodes 2 through 5 were given clearance to be wiped, and Episode 1 was cleared eventually on 20 October 1969. When the BBC's junking policy ended in 1978, Episode 3 was the only episode of this story to survive in the archives. All of the other episodes were destroyed sometime after 1974. Episode 3 was consciously kept, along with Episode 6 of The Wheel in Space (1968), as an example of season 5's production output. In October 2013, the BBC announced that copies of the remaining five episodes had been found in a television relay station in Jos, Nigeria, following search efforts by Philip Morris, director of Television International Enterprises Archive. After The Tomb of the Cybermen's discovery in 1992, it is the second serial from season 5 to be found in its entirety.

=== Reception ===
Prior to its 2013 rediscovery, The Enemy of the World received a mixed reception. The Discontinuity Guide (1995), Paul Cornell, Martin Day, and Keith Topping criticized the editing and wrote, "Troughton's fun villainy apart, it all feels rather irrelevant." In Doctor Who: The Television Companion (1998), David J. Howe, Mark Stammers, and Stephen James Walker wrote that the serial "must still be considered the weakest story of the fifth season, and one so markedly different in style from the others - most obviously in its lack of alien monsters - that it really sticks out like a sore thumb." They did praise the writing, dialogue, and Troughton's performance, though noted that Jamie and Victoria could act out of character. In 2009, Patrick Mulkern gave the serial four out of five stars, praising Troughton, the dystopian setting, and new characters. However, he wrote, "It purports to be a political thriller and is far from thrilling," with a let-down in setting and dialogue, as well as Jamie and Victoria not suited to their roles. In an addendum written after the missing episodes had been found, he commented that his critiques remained the same.

J.R. Southall of Starburst praised the guest cast Barry Letts's direction. He wrote, "It's a story that never entirely engages as a children's version of an adult story type, but it's really not that far from achieving its goals, and it's much faster, much bigger and much more engaging than many other stories of its time." The A.V. Club's Christopher Bahn called the story "highly entertaining" and praised Salamander's characterization as an evil foil to the Doctor, as well as the serial's ability to subvert expectations. In 2014, John Sinnott of DVD Talk highly recommended The Enemy of the World release and gave the content four out of five stars, writing, "While the story is very good, if unusual for Doctor Who, it is Patrick Troughton who makes the serial work." Charlie Jane Anders, on the other hand, ranked the serial 213 out of 254 of Doctor Who stories in 2015, describing it as "tragically silly and dull."

The Enemy of the World enjoyed a positive re-evaluation by fans after it was rediscovered, increasing in positive ratings in the Doctor Who Magazine poll by almost 15%, moving from 139th best story in 2009 to 56th in 2014. In Doctor Who Magazine it ranked the 10th best 1960s story in 2014 and the 7th best (out of 21) Second Doctor story in 2023, for the programme's 60th anniversary.

== Commercial releases ==
=== In print ===
Doctor Who and the Enemy of the World
- Author: Ian Marter
- Cover artist: Bill Donohoe
- Series: Doctor Who book: Target novelisations
- Release number: 24
- Publisher: Target Books
- Publication date: 17 April 1981
- ISBN: 0-426-20126-4

David Whitaker was approached to write the novelisation of The Enemy of the World in 1979 and planned some changes for the adaptation, but unfortunately he did not complete the book before his death in 1980. Ian Marter was commissioned to write the novelisation after, and it released in 1981 from Target Books. Marter considered it his least favourite novelisation because of cuts he had to make to fulfill the word count. An edition with a new cover, called Doctor Who — The Enemy of the World, was released in 1993.

=== Home media ===
Episode 3 was released on VHS in The Troughton Years. A restored and VidFIREd version was released on DVD in 2004, as part of the Lost in Time boxset. In 2002, a remastered CD version of the audio was released with linking narration by Frazer Hines.

Following the recovery of the remaining episodes, the complete serial was released on iTunes on 11 October 2013. Following its release it shared the top two spots on the iTunes download chart for TV serials with following the newly recovered serial The Web of Fear, above Homeland and Breaking Bad.

A DVD was released in the UK on 25 November 2013. A US release arrived on 20 May 2014. The BBC reported that the DVD held the classic Doctor Who sales record until the release of The Web of Fear DVD in 2014.

A special-edition DVD with audio commentary, interviews, a tribute to the late Deborah Watling, and further remastering of all six episodes was released in the UK on 26 March 2018.

In 2023, for the programme's 60th anniversary, The Enemy of the World became available to stream on BBC iPlayer. It is available internationally on BritBox.

== Bibliography ==
- Ainsworth, John, ed. (2016). "The Abominable Snowmen, The Ice Warriors, The Enemy of the World, and The Web of Fear". Doctor Who: The Complete History. Vol. 11, no. 20. London: Panini Comics, Hachette Partworks.
