= The Ice Warriors =

039 – The Ice Warriors
- Doctor Who serial
- Several of the scientists surrounding the base's computer system (Roy Skelton). The set design was highlighted by critics, though several were critical of the story's themes involving the computer.

Cast
- Doctor: Patrick Troughton – Second Doctor
- Companions: Frazer Hines – Jamie McCrimmon; Deborah Watling – Victoria Waterfield
- Others: Peter Barkworth – Clent; Peter Sallis – Penley; Wendy Gifford – Miss Garrett; Angus Lennie – Storr; Peter Diamond – Davis; George Waring – Arden; Malcolm Taylor – Walters; Roy Skelton – Voice of the Computer; Bernard Bresslaw – Varga; Roger Jones – Zondal; Sonny Caldinez – Turoc; Michael Attwell – Isbur; Tony Harwood – Rintan

Production
- Directed by: Derek Martinus
- Written by: Brian Hayles
- Script editor: Peter Bryant
- Produced by: Innes Lloyd
- Executive producer: None
- Music by: Dudley Simpson
- Production code: OO
- Series: Season 5
- Running time: 6 episodes, 25 minutes each
- Episode(s) missing: 2 episodes (2 and 3)
- First broadcast: 11 November 1967
- Last broadcast: 16 December 1967

Chronology
← Preceded by The Abominable Snowmen	Followed by → The Enemy of the World

The Ice Warriors is the partly missing third serial of the fifth season of the British science fiction television series Doctor Who, which was first broadcast in six weekly parts from 11 November to 16 December 1967. In this serial, the Second Doctor (Patrick Troughton), Jamie McCrimmon (Frazer Hines) and Victoria Waterfield (Deborah Watling) arrive on Earth during a second Ice age, where a research team has discovered an alien Ice Warrior preserved in a block of ice. The Ice Warrior, Varga (Bernard Bresslaw), awakens his crew and comes into conflict with the base and its members.

The serial was written by Brian Hayles, who at the time was interested in the concept of life on Mars. The discovery of a mammoth in a block of ice by the Berezovka River in 1901, in conjunction with the interest, inspired the creation of the titular Ice Warriors. The Warriors would be highly popular with viewers, and would recur in several later stories in the series.

The Ice Warriors has been met with a positive response from critics, with the Ice Warriors and the story's cast performances being particular highlights, though various aspects of the story have been criticised. In the years following the serial's airing, its episodes were destroyed by the BBC, resulting in them becoming missing from the corporation‘s archives. Though four of the story's six episodes were recovered in 1988, the other two currently remain missing. These episodes were reconstructed via animation for a DVD release of the story in 2013.

== Plot ==
The Second Doctor (Patrick Troughton), Jamie (Frazer Hines) and Victoria (Deborah Watling) arrive at a scientific base in the distant future, where Earth is plagued by a new Ice age. The base is largely managed by a computer system (Roy Skelton) which tells the base's members how to proceed. The Doctor helps the base's research team, led by Clent (Peter Barkworth) with an ioniser device, which is used to slow the progress of glaciers rolling over Great Britain. The Doctor soon after examines a recent discovery found in a glacier by scientist Arden: An alien Ice Warrior frozen in a block of ice. The Ice Warrior, Varga (Bernard Bresslaw), revives from the block and takes Victoria hostage.

Varga reveals he is from the planet Mars, and that he has been frozen for millennia. Varga revives a number of Ice Warriors from the ice and assigns them to excavate their spaceship. Jamie and Arden (George Waring) discover the excavation, but are ambushed by the Warriors on their way back to base, killing Arden. Penley (Peter Sallis) and Storr (Angus Lennie), two scientists who abandoned the base due to disliking its reliance on the computer, take Jamie back to their home while Storr goes to reason with the Warriors, leading to Storr's death. The Doctor sets out to rescue Victoria from the Warriors' ship.

The Doctor is able to rescue Victoria as Varga prepares an assault on the base via a sonic cannon. Penley brings Jamie back to the base, and though the Doctor kills one of the Warriors, Zondal (Roger Jones), who is preparing to fire a sonic cannon, Zondal is able to activate it as he dies. The blast only causes minor damage, but Varga threatens another blast unless the humans surrender. The two sides arrange a peace meeting, but due to the interference of Walters (Malcolm Taylor), a technician who tries to shoot the Warriors, the talks fail. Varga dismantles the ioniser reactor to get power for the Warriors' ship.

The Doctor and Victoria adjust the sonic cannon so it will only harm the Ice Warriors while Penley alters the temperature and atmosphere controls in the base so it becomes uncomfortable for the Warriors. Varga and the other Warriors retreat, but disable the cannon. Despite Clent's hesitation to disobey the orders of the base's computer, the Doctor and Penley recalibrate the ioniser to destroy the spaceship, and the ship explodes, destroying both the Warriors and the approaching glacier. The Doctor, Jamie and Victoria depart as plant-life emerges through melting snow.

== Production ==
=== Writing and design ===
In early 1967, while preparing for the show's fifth season, the Doctor Who production team was looking for a new alien race, specifically a bipedal creature, to complement popular antagonists such as the Daleks and Cybermen. In some accounts, the new species was meant to replace the Daleks, who were scheduled to be written out of the series at the time. Writer Brian Hayles ended up creating the new monsters. He was interested in life on Mars and thought the idea of a race of reptilian humanoids was a plausible concept. As well as Hayles's interest in Mars, he was inspired by a story of a mammoth found preserved in a block of ice by the Berezovka River in 1901, which gave him the idea of an alien being revived after being similarly discovered.

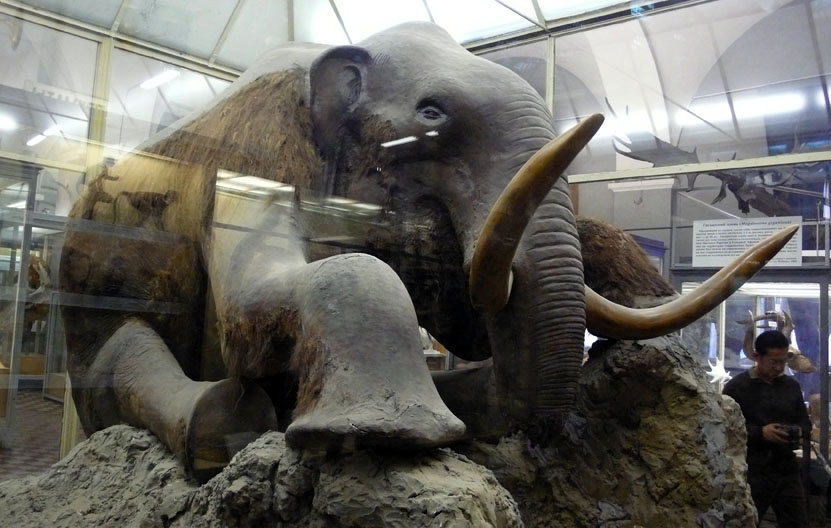
A model of the mammoth discovered at the Berezovka river that inspired Hayles to create the Ice Warriors, as seen on display at the Zoological Museum in Saint Petersburg.

Hayles was commissioned on June 26, 1967 to write the story, which would have six parts, with the story quickly landing on the setting of a second Ice Age. The serial's storyline followed a format used by producer Innes Lloyd and script editor Gerry Davis in which a small cast of characters were kept confined on a small set while attacked by a monster. Victor Pemberton worked on this story as a temporary script editor, though would end up leaving the role soon after, feeling that scripts for the show were lacking in quality and that he wanted to return to writing, while also feeling that Hayles was resistant to edits to his scripts. Derrick Sherwin would subsequently take over as script editor.

By July 6, it was unclear which story was meant to open a new production block following production of The Tomb of the Cybermen (1967). Originally intended to be the first story of the season, The Ice Warriors was shifted down to follow The Abominable Snowmen (1967) in the season's story order. As a result, a line was included referencing the prior serial.

Costume designer Martin Baugh was inspired by the name "Ice Warrior", as it made him think of a hard, armoured creature. He saw the creatures as like crocodiles and thus made them appear physically reptilian in nature; according to some accounts, Hayles had conceived them as cyborg Vikings, and Baugh's change was done to avoid confusion with the Cybermen, also cyborgs. Taking inspiration from descriptions of the Ice Warriors' Viking-like helmets, Baugh envisioned their armour as central to their appearance, akin to a bipedal turtle. He suggested the Ice Warrior costumes be cast in fibreglass. The final costume used a two-piece fibreglass shell, heavy latex rubber for the arms and legs—with the former ending in clamp-like hands—and matted fur between the joints and at the hips. Red Perspex was used to act as the eyeholes of the helmets, and the actors' eyelids behind the mask were painted a dark green. Plans to have the eyes glow were dropped due to concerns that it would overheat the actors. The final costumes were 7 ft (2.1 m) tall.

The scientists' costumes were also designed by Baugh. Described as "psychedelic", Baugh designed them under the idea that clothes in the future would be sprayed onto a person. Baugh based these costumes on circuitry imagery in New Scientist magazine, as well as the work of French fashion designer André Courrèges. The main cast of Troughton, Hines, and Watling would continue to use their outfits from The Abominable Snowmen for this story, though Watling would gain an additional cloak.

=== Casting and characters ===
Varga (Bernard Bresslaw, left) confronting Storr (Angus Lennie, right). The Ice Warriors' visual design changed significantly throughout production.

Patrick Troughton, Frazer Hines, and Deborah Watling reprise their main cast roles as the Second Doctor, Jamie McCrimmon, and Victoria Waterfield, respectively. Peter Sallis portrayed Penley, while Angus Lennie portrayed Storr. Arden is portrayed by George Waring, and Walters is portrayed by Malcolm Taylor. Peter Barkworth portrays the base's leader, Clent, while Wendy Gifford portrays Jane Garrett. Roy Skelton voices the computer that is used on the base.

Bernard Bresslaw portrayed the Ice Warrior Varga, and is credited with creating the Ice Warriors' whisper-like voices, which would be retained in subsequent stories. Tony Harwood plays another of the Ice Warriors, and also fills in for Bresslaw in some scenes shot while Bresslaw was busy filming Carry On Doctor (1967). Sonny Caldinez also portrays an Ice Warrior, and would return to play members of the species in the subsequent serials.

=== Filming ===
Although Hayles had written the scripts so most of the filming involving the glacier could be done in studio, director Derek Martinus would shift some of the recording to Ealing Studios to give a greater feeling of space to the sets. Filming began on 25 September 1967, and would overlap with the filming of some episodes of The Abominable Snowmen. Stock footage was used for backgrounds depicting the icy landscape of the story.

The base control room, filmed at Lime Grove Studios, used table props seen in 1964's The Sensorites, which were decorated with oscilloscopes. A map depicting glacier movement, used as a backdrop, was displayed using a projector, though the map prop projected was accidentally destroyed during the second episode's filming and had to be recreated. In the centre of the control room was the prop for the computer, operated from inside by an actor. Three total operators operated the prop at different points during the story's production.

During filming, Martinus requested changes to the Ice Warrior costumes, specifically less bulky helmets, since the costumes did not allow for much head movement. He also wanted the Ice Warriors' sonic blaster weapons to be built into the costume. The helmets of all five Ice Warrior costumes produced for the serial were made smaller, though some were changed more than others, with Bresslaw's in particular being adjusted as he was the main Ice Warrior performer. Filming would eventually wrap on 25 November 1967.

Composer Dudley Simpson was brought on to produce the episode's soundtrack. Simpson had previously worked on The Evil of the Daleks (1967), and re-used leitmotifs from Victoria's theme from that serial for The Ice Warriors. The Ice Warriors had predominantly percussion-heavy music play in several scenes where they appeared on-screen. Vocals were recorded by singer Joanne Brown for a track titled Ice Music, heard both during an Ice Warrior chase scene and during the story's opening titles.

Martinus, fearing being "pigeonholed", would leave his role as a director for the series following this serial, returning for 1970 serial Spearhead from Space. Despite his initial reluctance to work on the story, Martinus would later claim it was his favorite story he had directed from the series.

== Broadcast and reception ==
Episode	Title	Run time	Original release date	UK viewers (millions)	Appreciation Index
1	"One"	24:21	11 November 1967	6.7	52
2	"Two"^{†}	24:16	18 November 1967	7.1	52
3	"Three"^{†}	23:58	25 November 1967	7.4	51
4	"Four"	24:23	2 December 1967	7.3	51
5	"Five"	24:25	9 December 1967	8.0	50
6	"Six"	23:58	16 December 1967	7.5	51

^† Episode is missing

Unusually, the word "episode" was dropped from each episode number in this serial. The serial's first episode aired in an earlier time slot than usual to account for BBC's Festival of Remembrance coverage that evening. Viewing figures for the story were an improvement on the prior serial, The Abominable Snowmen, with The Ice Warriors also garnering a decent audience appreciation rating.

The story was still being offered for sale by 1974, but by 1978 the serial was marked for destruction by the BBC and believed to have been destroyed. The serial's videotapes were believed destroyed by 1969. In August 1988, recordings of the first, fourth, fifth, and sixth episodes were recovered from a cupboard in Villiers House in Ealing, while BBC Enterprises was in the process of moving out of the building. The surviving episodes were later aired at various events over the years.

=== Reception and legacy ===
Paul Cornell, Martin Day, and Keith Topping gave the serial a favourable review in The Discontinuity Guide (1995), highlighting the setting, guest cast performances, and the Ice Warriors. In The Television Companion (1998), David J. Howe and Stephen James Walker praised the Ice Warriors and the story's guest cast, though felt the story's setting lacked a good sense of relation to each other. Patrick Mulkern of Radio Times praised the main cast's performances, though felt the story's message about humanity's overreliance on computers did not age well.

Reviewing the DVD release in 2013, SFX reviewer Ian Berriman found Penley and Clent's characterisations in the story to be weak and felt the Ice Warriors had questionable motivations as antagonists. Berriman however felt the worldbuilding and set design of the story was strong. John Sinnott of DVD Talk reviewed the story's DVD release, feeling the story to be slow-paced and focused too much on the conflict involving the computer, while also feeling the story had many logical holes. However, Sinnott praised Troughton's performance, the set design, and the Ice Warriors as antagonists. Starburst's Paul Mount praised the performances of the cast, as well as the Ice Warriors, though found the story to be overly long.

Following this serial's airing, the Ice Warriors' popularity would lead to a sequel story featuring them being produced. The Warriors would subsequently act as a recurring alien species throughout the show's television run.

The programming committee of the public German TV broadcaster ZDF refused unanimously to buy the series after watching The Ice Warriors for a test. Reasons given included the decoration, costume design, and writing. Subsequently Doctor Who remained relatively unknown in German-speaking countries.

== Commercial releases ==
Doctor Who and the Ice Warriors
- Author: Brian Hayles
- Cover artist: Chris Achilleos
- Series: Doctor Who book: Target novelisations
- Release number: 33
- Publisher: Target Books
- Publication date: 18 March 1976
- ISBN: 0-426-10866-3

In March 1976, Target Books published a novelisation by Brian Hayles of this serial. The novel would be republished in 1978, 1979, and 2012. An audiobook narration of the story read by Hines was released in 2010.

The serial was initially released on video in 1998, and included reconstructions of the missing episodes using an unofficial soundtrack recording of the original stories, with tele-snaps being used for visuals. Another VHS release included The Ice Warriors among a number of other stories with missing episodes. Off-air soundtrack recordings were released in 2005, with the story being narrated by Hines. The serial was later included in a collection of stories with missing episodes in 2012. Incidental music from the story was included in a collection of music from throughout the series in 2013.

The serial was released on DVD on 26 August 2013, with parts 2 and 3 being recreated in animated form, with Qurios Entertainment providing the animation. The animation for the serial was designed to greatly resemble the original story in terms of quality, with the story's set and character designs based on existing visuals for the story. On 13 June 2021, the soundtrack with the Hines narration was released on vinyl by Demon Records.
