= Ice Warrior =

Fictional alien from Doctor Who

Ice Warriors
- Doctor Who race
- Promotional image depicting an Ice Queen (left), an Ice Lord (right), and an Ice Warrior
- First appearance: The Ice Warriors (1967)
- Created by: Brian Hayles

In-universe information
- Home world: Mars
- Type: Reptilian humanoids
- Affiliation: The Galactic Federation

The Ice Warriors are a fictional extraterrestrial race of reptilian humanoids in the British science fiction television series Doctor Who. Natives of Mars, the Ice Warriors wear bio-mechanical armour to protect themselves from attack and temperature fluctuations. In their debut, the 1967 serial The Ice Warriors, they fought the Second Doctor. Two years later, they reappeared in The Seeds of Death. In 1972's The Curse of Peladon, they were allied with the Doctor, reverting to antagonists in The Monster of Peladon two years later. The Ice Warriors did not appear again on-screen until the show's 2005 revival series in the episode "Cold War" (2013), followed by the 2017 episode "Empress of Mars". They have also appeared in spin-off media for the series.

Writer Brian Hayles created the Ice Warriors out of his interest in life on Mars at a time when the production team was looking for new recurring antagonists. The Ice Warriors were conceived as something akin to cyborg Vikings. Designer Martin Baugh, inspired by their name and influenced by crocodiles, designed them to appear reptilian; this prevented the species from being visually similar to another fictional species who were cyborgs, the Cybermen. The costumes for the Ice Warriors often proved heavy and cumbersome for actors during filming. For the show's 2005 revival, showrunner Steven Moffat originally did not want the Ice Warriors to return, allowing them to come back only after writer Mark Gatiss pitched the idea of an Ice Warrior outside its shell. The Ice Warriors received a design overhaul for the revival but were largely the same visually; "Cold War" also showcased the creature beneath the armour.

The Ice Warriors have been received positively, and are among the series's best-known antagonists despite the large gaps in between their appearances. Their design and role in the two Peladon serials, as well as in "Cold War", have been the subject of commentary and analysis.

== Appearances ==
=== Television series ===
Doctor Who is a British science-fiction television series that began in 1963. Its protagonist is the Doctor, an alien who travels through time and space with travelling companions in a ship known as the TARDIS. When the Doctor dies, they undergo a process known as "regeneration", completely changing their appearance and personality. Throughout their travels, the Doctor comes into conflict with many alien species and antagonists.

The Ice Warriors are a reptilian warrior race from Mars who wear bio-mechanical armour which protects them from attack and hostile temperature conditions. They are equipped with sonic weapons mounted into the wrists. They follow an honour code and are ruled either by an "Ice Lord" or an "Ice Queen".

==== Classic era ====
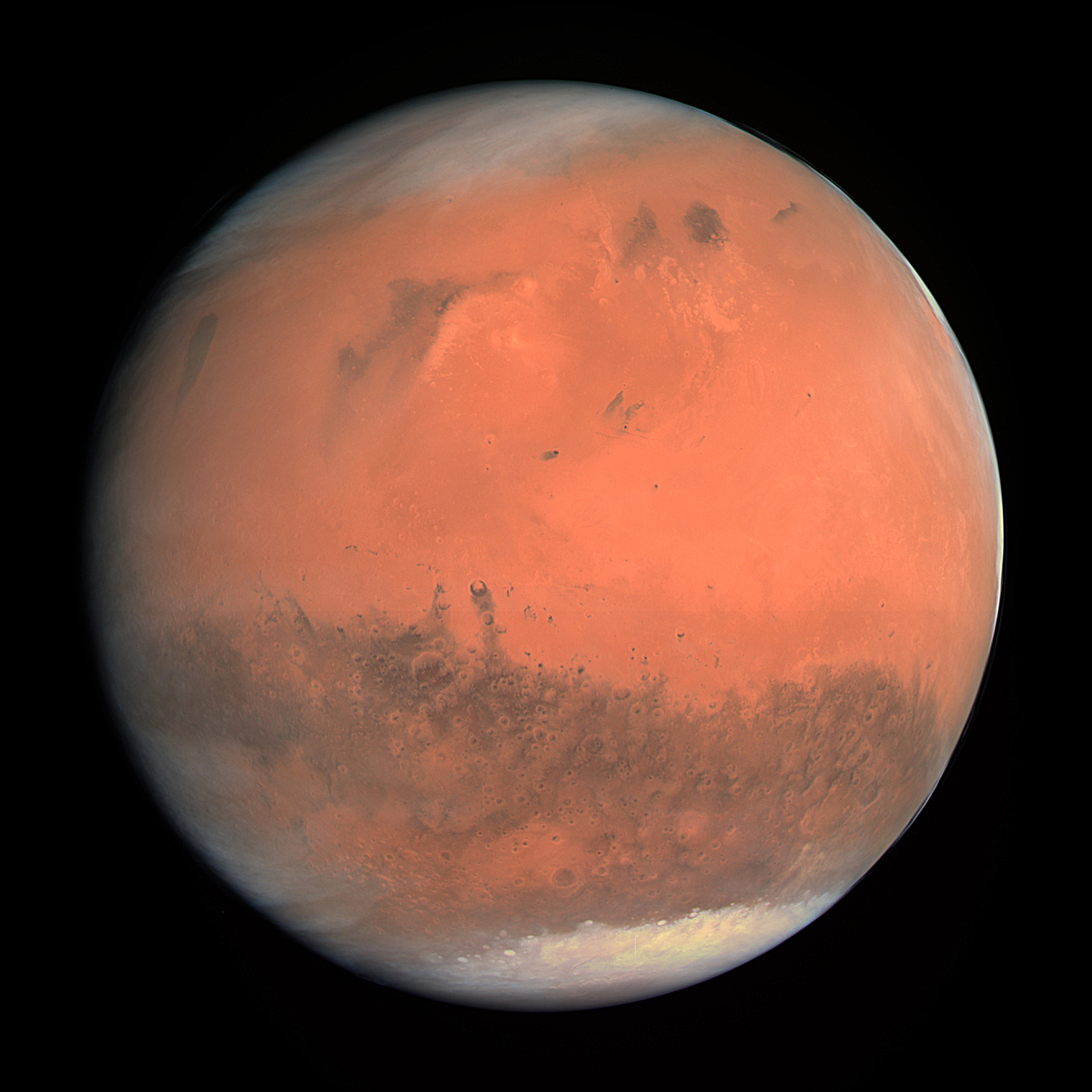
An image of the planet Mars, which the Ice Warriors hail from in-universe

The Ice Warriors first appeared in the 1967 serial The Ice Warriors, set on Earth during a future ice age in the year 3000. The hibernating crew of an Ice Warrior spacecraft buried underneath the ice are revived by a scientific team. The Second Doctor thwarts the Warriors' attempt to take over the scientists' base. The Ice Warriors returned for the 1969 serial The Seeds of Death. In this story, mid-21st century Earth has grown dependent on the matter transmission system T-Mat. An Ice Warrior strike force, seeking to conquer Earth, sends seeds through the T-Mat that are intended to make Earth more suitable for Martian life. After this plan is thwarted by the Second Doctor and his companions, the invading Martian fleet is sent into orbit around the Sun.

In 1972's The Curse of Peladon, the Ice Warriors have renounced violence and become members of the "Galactic Federation", an alliance of several races. A group of them are part of a delegation sent to negotiate the planet Peladon's entry into the Federation. The Third Doctor initially suspects that the Ice Warriors are behind an attempt to sabotage the proceedings but accepts that they have changed after the Ice Warriors save his life. With their help, the Doctor foils a plot to prevent Peladon's admission. A sequel, The Monster of Peladon (1974) and is set fifty years after the events of The Curse of Peladon. Here, the Ice Warriors are depicted serving as Federation peacekeeping troops. Their leader, the Ice Lord Azaxyr, is secretly working with an enemy of the Federation and seeks to return to the species' warlike past. Azaxyr tries to impose martial law and take over Peladon but is stopped by the Peladonians and the Third Doctor.

==== Revived era ====
The 2013 episode "Cold War" sees an Ice Warrior named Grand Marshal Skaldak, found frozen in a chunk of ice, being discovered by a Soviet nuclear submarine. Skaldak, frozen for thousands of years, believes his race is dead and that he is the last of his kind. He attempts to obliterate humanity using the submarine's nuclear warheads; he relents after the Eleventh Doctor's companion Clara Oswald reminds Skaldak of his daughter, whom he had told her about previously. An Ice Warrior ship soon arrives, and Skaldak, seeing his race still alive, departs with them as he deactivates the warheads.

The Ice Warriors reappear in the 2017 episode "Empress of Mars". In it, Victorian-era soldiers find a crashed Ice Warrior ship and wake its sole inhabitant, "Friday", from suspended animation. Friday brings the soldiers to Mars, where he discovers Mars has become unable to support life since he went into suspended animation. Friday tricks the soldiers into re-awakening the dormant Ice Queen, Iraxxa, and a hive of Ice Warriors. After initial combat, the soldiers' colonel, Godsacre, negotiates a peace. The Twelfth Doctor calls the Galactic Federation to pick up the remaining Ice Warriors from Mars so that they will join the Federation in the future.

=== In spin-off media ===
The Ice Warriors appear in several novels, including 1990's Mission to Magnus, an adaptation of a scrapped on-screen Ice Warrior serial; 1992's Transit; 1994's Legacy; 1996's GodEngine and Happy Endings; 1997's The Dying Days; and 2011's The Silent Stars Go By. In comics, the species appear in the strips Deathworld (1980), where they fight the Cybermen; 4-Dimensional Vistas (1983), which sees the Fifth Doctor combatting the Ice Warriors and the Meddling Monk; and the Seventh Doctor strip A Cold Day in Hell (1987–1988). An Ice Warrior named Harma appears in the comic strip Star Tigers as an ally of Abslom Daak. The Ice Warriors appear in several audio dramas published by Big Finish Productions, including Red Dawn (2000), Frozen Time (2007), The Bride of Peladon (2008), The Judgement of Isskar (2009), Deimos (2010), The Resurrection of Mars (2010), Lords of the Red Planet (2013), and Cold Vengeance (2017).

Many of these spin-off appearances have been described by author Ivan Phillips as an example of a creature in the series that takes mysteries presented on-screen that were subsequently expanded upon in spin-off material. Stories such as these expanded on concepts not elaborated upon in their on-screen stories, such as the nature of the Ice Warriors as cyborgs and the origin of the species and its ruling class.

An Ice Warrior named Ssard acts as a companion of the Eighth Doctor in spin-off media. First appearing in Radio Times comic strips, Ssard joins the Doctor after helping him deal with a treacherous Ice Warrior leader. Ssard becomes close with the Doctor's companion Stacy Townsend, and in the 1998 novel Placebo Effect, they leave the Doctor to get married.

== Conception and development ==
=== 1960s ===
==== The Ice Warriors ====
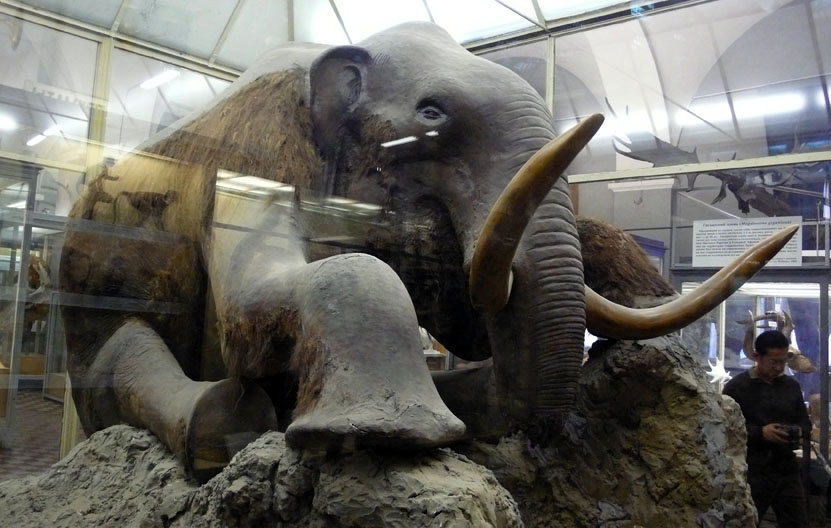
A model of the mammoth that inspired Hayles to create the Ice Warriors, as seen on display at the Zoological Museum in Saint Petersburg.

In early 1967, while preparing for the show's fifth season, the Doctor Who production team was looking for a new alien race, specifically a bipedal creature, to complement popular antagonists such as the Daleks and Cybermen. In some accounts, the new species was meant to replace the Daleks, who were scheduled to be written out of the series at the time. Writer Brian Hayles ended up creating the new monsters. He was interested in life on Mars and thought the idea of a race of reptilian humanoids was a plausible concept. Writer J. J. Elridge commented that the Ice Warriors were an example of the trope of life on Mars being so widespread that it was assumed by the series's writers as a foregone conclusion. As well as Hayles's interest in Mars, he was inspired by a story of a mammoth found preserved in a block of ice by the Berezovka River in 1901, which gave him the idea of an alien being revived after being similarly discovered. The Ice Warriors were designed to exhibit more personality than the Daleks and Cybermen.

Costume designer Martin Baugh was inspired by the name "Ice Warrior", as it made him think of a hard, armoured creature. He saw the creatures as like crocodiles and thus made them appear physically reptilian in nature; according to some accounts, Hayles had conceived them as cyborg Vikings, and Baugh's change was done to avoid confusion with the Cybermen, also cyborgs. Taking inspiration from descriptions of the Ice Warriors' Viking-like helmets, Baugh envisioned their armour as central to their appearance, akin to a bipedal turtle. He suggested the Ice Warrior costumes be cast in fibreglass.

The final costume used a two-piece fibreglass shell, heavy latex rubber for the arms and legs (the former ending in clamp-like hands) and matted fur between the joints and at the hips. Red Perspex was used to act as the eyeholes of the helmets, and the actors' eyelids behind the mask were painted a dark green. Plans to have the eyes glow were dropped due to concerns that it would overheat the actors. The final costumes were 7 ft (2.1 m) tall. Due to their bulk, they were very hot, and actors would sweat out around a pint (570 ml) in less than an hour. During filming, director Derek Martinus requested changes, specifically less bulky helmets, since the costumes did not allow for much head movement. He also wanted the Ice Warriors' sonic blaster weapons to be built into the costume. The helmets of all five Ice Warrior costumes produced for the serial were made smaller, though some were changed more than others.

Bernard Bresslaw portrayed the Ice Warrior Varga in their debut. He used a whisper-like voice to depict the Ice Warriors' reptilian nature, an idea attributed to him that would be used in subsequent serials. Author Graham Sleight describes this voice as suggesting the Ice Warriors are uncomfortable within Earth's atmosphere, adding character to the species. Military drumbeats were used as a musical cue for when the Ice Warriors appeared, a motif reused in later serials.

==== The Seeds of Death ====
The popularity of the Ice Warriors led to a sequel to their debut story being produced. The first plan for a sequel was titled The Lords of the Red Planet and would have revealed the Ice Warriors to have been genetically engineered by another Martian species named the Gandorans. This was replaced by The Seeds of Death. For this serial, new costumes were built featuring the slimmer head introduced late into The Ice Warriors's filming. Ice Warrior dialogue was pre-recorded due to difficulty speaking in the costumes.

The inclusion of Slaar, an Ice Lord with a different design, was a suggestion by script editor Terrance Dicks to make the species more interesting. Slaar's costume was primarily neoprene rubber; the hands, helmet, and chest plate were made of fibreglass. Alan Bennion, Slaar's actor, had rubber pebbles stuck to his face to resemble reptilian skin, with black enamel being used to make his teeth pointed. Though some of Bennion's dialogue was recorded in studio via a radio microphone attached to his helmet, other parts of his dialogue were pre-recorded. Bennion could not hear or see through the helmet; an off-camera floor manager would tap him on the legs as a dialogue cue.

=== 1970s and scrapped reappearances ===
Following the eighth season's focus on Earth-based encounters with antagonist the Master, the production team wanted to return to stories featuring the Doctor fighting monsters for the show's ninth season. Many past alien species were considered for returns, including the Ice Warriors. Hayles submitted two scripts in 1971 for this season, one of which had the Ice Warriors using a "Z-Beam" device to turn humans into mindless zombies to do their bidding. Dicks was unimpressed; at a brainstorming session, he, Hayles, and producer Barry Letts created the concept for The Curse of Peladon, with Hayles coming up with the idea of the Ice Warriors having become peaceful instead of acting as antagonists. To deceive audiences and play on their expectations, Hayles planted clues throughout The Curse of Peladon's script to make viewers initially think the Ice Warriors were the serial's antagonists.

The Varga costume from The Ice Warriors was reused for the Ice Warrior Ssorg, portrayed by actor Sonny Caldinez. (Note: Caldinez had previously portrayed an Ice Warrior in their debut serial.) The costume for the Ice Lord Izlyr was new but heavily based on the original appearance of the Ice Lord in The Seeds of Death, with Bennion returning to portray Izlyr. The new Ice Lord costume was a one-piece jumpsuit, and a cape hid its clasp. Unlike his prior appearance, Bennion could speak his dialogue in-studio, though Caldinez's had to be pre-recorded due to difficulties with a rubber mouthpiece used for his costume.

For the 1974 season, Hayles was brought on to write a sequel to the first Peladon story, which became The Monster of Peladon. Hayles again planned to deceive the audience via the Ice Warriors; instead of being the Doctor's allies like in Curse, they would be enemies again. Bennion and Caldinez both returned to portray an Ice Lord and Ice Warrior, respectively, though this time they portrayed the characters Azaxyr and Sskel. Bennion acted his dialogue in studio, while Caldinez pre-recorded his dialogue. The Ice Lord costume was reused from the earlier serial, with minor additions such as a belt being added. Caldinez utilised the Varga costume once again, with more Ice Warriors in the serial wearing costumes held in stock. The other actors felt restricted in the costumes and had difficulty breathing; the helmets also tended to mist up. Unlike prior appearances, their weapons were not part of the costume and were instead held separately.

The Ice Warriors would not appear in the Classic series again after this. The Ice Warriors were planned to return in Mission to Magnus, a scrapped story for the 1986 season, and another Ice Warrior story was planned for the proposed 1990 season, though this was scrapped due to the show's 1989 cancellation. Their next on-screen appearance would be in the series's 2005 revival.

=== Revived era ===
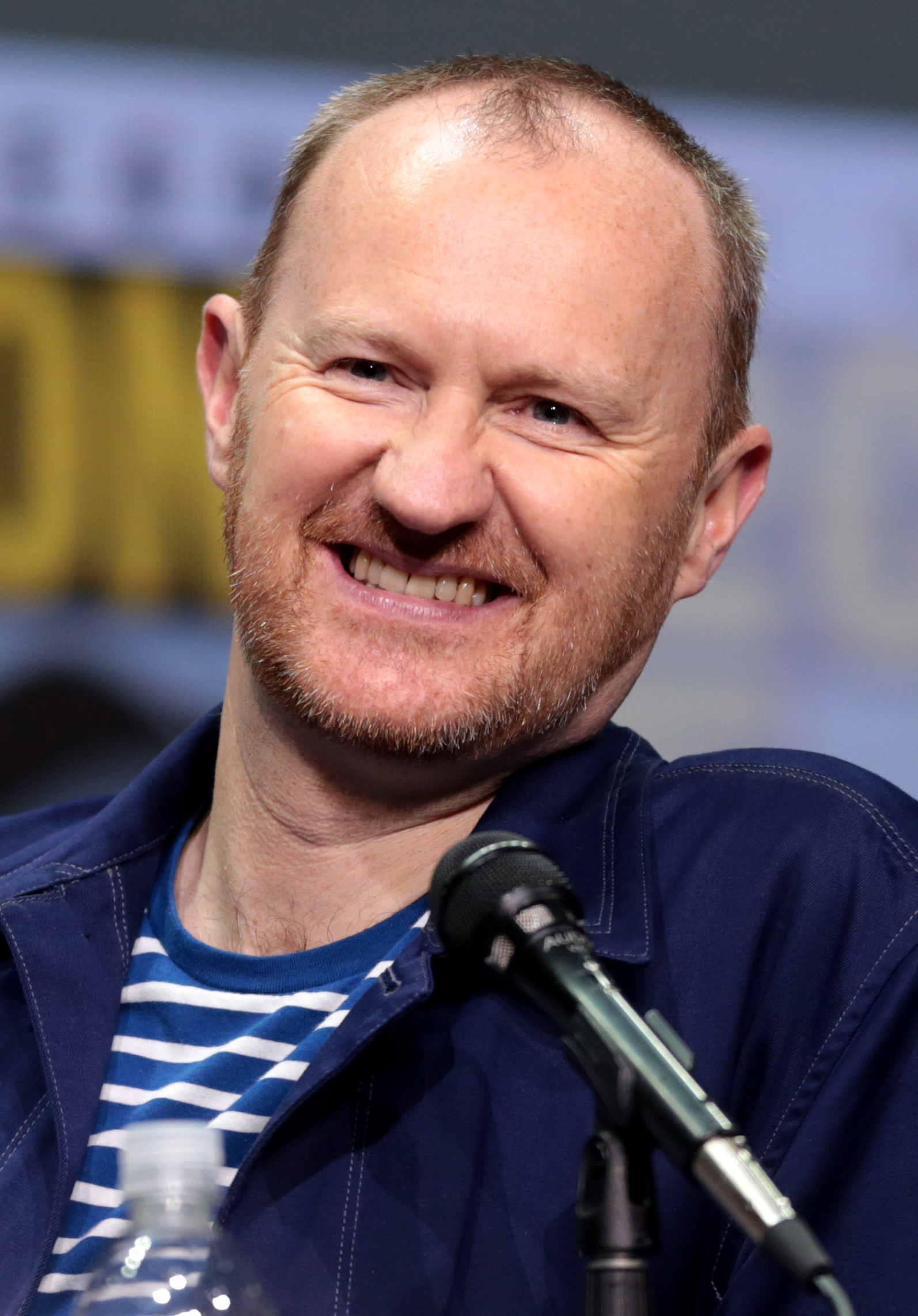
Mark Gatiss was responsible for the Ice Warriors' return.

==== "Cold War" ====
For the 2005 Doctor Who revival, showrunner Russell T Davies had wanted to bring the Ice Warriors back. However, barring a brief mention in the 2009 episode "The Waters of Mars", they did not appear during his original five-year tenure as showrunner. His successor, Steven Moffat, brought them back to the screen in 2013 for the series seven episode "Cold War". Moffat was hesitant at first, seeing the Ice Warriors as "the default condition for what people thought of as rubbish Doctor Who monsters: things that moved very, very slowly and spoke in a way that meant you couldn't hear a word they said". He also believed the show did not need to reach into its back catalogue of antagonists for ideas anymore. Writer Mark Gatiss, a big fan of the Ice Warriors, had pitched their return for many years. He convinced Moffat to allow for their return, as the pitched story involved them being seen without their armour, which had not yet been done in the series.

The Ice Warriors received a physical redesign, Gatiss insisting during production that the species should retain the fundamentals of their design from the Classic era serials. Millennium FX's Neill Gorton, in charge of the redesign, gave the Ice Warriors a bodybuilder physique, styled the armour to resemble plating, and removed the fur present in the original design. The Warriors' hands were also altered so that the clamps did not resemble those of a Lego minifigure. The costume was made of flexible urethane rubber instead of fibreglass like the original, since urethane is more durable and more comfortable to wear. The costume was made to fit Spencer Wilding, who physically portrayed the Ice Warrior Skaldak. Nicholas Briggs voiced Skaldak, with Wilding miming the words on-set.

The story was the first time the appearance of an Ice Warrior without armour had been depicted. Gatiss's script described the creature, without its armour, as "wet and leathery" and moving like a gecko, with dark black eyes and sharp teeth. An animatronic prop for Skaldak's true form was constructed, though it was not seen entirely on-screen. Computer-generated imagery was used to depict Skaldak's face in a scene where he confronts the Doctor, with motion capture being used to lip sync Skaldak's face with Briggs's voice.

==== "Empress of Mars" ====
Gatiss announced the Ice Warriors would return for the revival's tenth series in 2017, hinting at the introduction of a "new kind of Ice Warrior" that would appear in his episode "Empress of Mars". Gatiss had originally planned to write a sequel to his 2015 episode "Sleep No More". However, since many of the show's regulars were departing at the end of that series, Gatiss was unsure of his future with the show. He thus decided to produce a story depicting the Ice Warriors on Mars, which he had always wanted to do. Moffat agreed only if Gatiss could introduce another interesting concept for the species, which led to the introduction of a female Ice Warrior, a first for the series. This was incorporated as the character Iraxxa, an "Ice Queen" whose concept was inspired by the Ice Lords. Older story drafts involved a return to Peladon, but was scrapped due to similarities with the episode "The Eaters of Light". To fill in gaps in the Ice Warrior mythology, Gatiss invented the idea of Ice Warriors living in hives. To conceal the species' return before their reveal, paperwork for the series referred to them as "enemies".

One of the Ice Warrior costumes was a repaired version of the costume used for Skaldak in "Cold War", with two other costumes created for the episode. The construction of the helmets, as well as a cooling fan inside, required that earpieces be placed inside the helmets so the actors could hear. Iraxxa's costume was constructed out of fibreglass, foam, and plastic, with silicone used to represent her hair. She was portrayed by actress Adele Lynch.

== Reception ==
Since their debut in the 1960s, the Ice Warriors have been considered one of the most iconic and successful of the show's alien antagonists. Author Graham Sleight has noted the Ice Warriors' popularity and fondness among viewers of the series despite their infrequent appearances on television, with SFX's Nick Setchfield stating that the Warriors were often considered one of the show's "Big Four" monsters, alongside the Daleks, Cybermen, and Sontarans. Their large, bulky design has been attributed by multiple authors as being a key factor in the success of their visual design, with Sleight further stating that the implications of a reptilian being underneath the armour helped to further a sense of mystery behind the Ice Warriors. Hayles, their creator, suggested the Ice Warriors were popular due to being organic creatures with emotions, unlike the mechanical Daleks and Cybermen, which allowed viewers to better identify with the species.

Several critics have highlighted the Ice Warriors' role in The Curse of Peladon as greatly expanding on their character and being one of the most standout parts of the story. Burk and Smith? credited the serial with giving the Ice Warriors greater depth and shifting how alien species were perceived on the show as a whole, the pair stating that the story allowed for alien species in the show to have "more nuanced motivations" that did not require them to act as antagonists. Frank Collins, while discussing "Cold War" for Slate with another writer, noted that unlike other monsters, the Ice Warriors evolved as characters and did not just act as "the monster of the week".

The return of the Ice Warriors in 2013's "Cold War" was commented on by reviewers. Several critics praised Skaldak's role in the story, with Alasdair Wilkins of The A.V. Club considering the episode to be the revamp the Ice Warriors needed for the modern age. Critics were more mixed on the usage of the Ice Warrior outside of its armour; some reacted positively to the use of this gimmick within the story, but others, such as author Ivan Phillips, complained that the reveal of the Ice Warriors' face beneath the armour took away some of the ambiguity of the Ice Warrior design which had made them so successful before.
