= United! =

British TV drama series (1965–1967)

- Created by: Anthony Cornish
- Country of origin: United Kingdom
- Original language: English
- No. of series: 2
- No. of episodes: 147

Production
- Running time: 30 minutes

Original release
- Network: BBC1
- Release: 4 October 1965 – 2 March 1967

United! is a British television series that was produced by the BBC between 1965 and 1967, and was broadcast twice-weekly on BBC1. The theme tune was The Tops, a brass band march by Thomas J. Powell.

The series followed the fortunes of a fictional second division football team, Brentwich United. The football scenes were filmed on the grounds of Stoke City with Jimmy Hill acting as a technical advisor, and the efforts to achieve authenticity saw the show being criticised by the then management of Wolverhampton Wanderers, who complained that the series was based on their team.

United! was not a success, and was cancelled after two series. The programme was generally considered to be too soft to appeal to male viewers, and too male-oriented for the female soap opera audience. As was common television practice at the time, the series' videotapes were wiped for reuse, and it is believed that none of its 147 episodes have survived.

Created by Anthony Cornish, from an idea by footballer Dudley Kernick, other writers on the programme included Gerry Davis, Brian Hayles, Malcolm Hulke and John Lucarotti. The directors included Innes Lloyd and Derek Martinus. Aside from Cornish, all of these individuals also worked on Doctor Who concurrent with their involvement in the series. Another Doctor Who connection was Derrick Sherwin, who featured briefly as a fiery Welsh striker and went on to write and produce extensively for the sci-fi series.

== Cast ==
- David Lodge, as Gerry Barford (manager)
- Ursula O'Leary, as Mary Barford (his wife)
- Ben Howard as Curly Parker (136 episodes, 1965–1967)
- Mark Kingston as Danny South (133 episodes, 1965–1967)
- Robin Wentworth as Ted Dawson (116 episodes, 1965–1967)
- Beverley Jones as Deirdre Gosling (105 episodes, 1965–1967)
- Graham Weston as Gregg Harris (89 episodes, 1965–1967)
- John Breslin as Bob McIver (88 episodes, 1966–1967)
- George Layton as Jimmy Stokes (85 episodes, 1965–1966)
- Marigold Sharman as Fiona Nixon (78 episodes, 1966–1967)
- Jillie Meers as Amanda Holly (74 episodes, 1966–1967)
- Harold Goodwin as Horace Martin (73 episodes, 1965–1966)
- John Lyons as Alan Murdoch (70 episodes, 1966–1967)
- Warwick Sims as Vic Clay (69 episodes, 1966–1967)
- Michael Redfern as Chris Wood (59 episodes, 1965–1966)
- Tony Caunter as Dick Mitchell (57 episodes, 1966–1967)
- Stephen Yardley as Kenny Craig (55 episodes, 1965–1966)
- Arthur Pentelow as Dan Davis (53 episodes, 1965–1966)
- Ronald Allen as Mark Wilson (53 episodes, 1966–1967)
- Ballard Berkeley as Dr. Newkes (53 episodes, 1966)
- Bryan Marshall as Jack Burkett
- Derrick Sherwin as Bryn Morriston
- Mitzi Rogers as Jean Jones
- Arnold Peters as Frank Silby
