= Sonny Caldinez =

Trinidadian actor and professional wrestler (1932–2022)

- Born: Laudrick Kelvin Caldinez; 1 July 1932; Trinidad, British West Indies
- Died: 12 April 2022 (aged 89); London, United Kingdom
- Occupations: Actor, bodyguard, wrestler
- Spouse(s): Jeanette Pedder (m. 1958, divorced) Sylvia Lackhan (m. 1979)

Sonny Caldinez (1 July 1932 – 12 April 2022) was a Trinidadian actor and professional wrestler. He was often cast in television and films for his great height and muscular physique.

== Early life ==
Caldinez came to England at the age of 20 as a migrant from then-current or recent British colonies encouraged to come to the United Kingdom in the late 1940s and early 1950s to help rebuild the country's workforce and economy after the Second World War. Upon arrival, he was unable to find a job but a friend found him a job working at British Rail shovelling coal in railway yards. In the early 1960's he was a capstan operator at Lancashire Dynamo & Cryto in Harlesden North London. Realising that he needed to do something better in life, Caldinez trained as an amateur wrestler at Foresters Amateur Wrestling Club in West London. Four years later, he took up professional wrestling, travelling the world wrestling in places like India, the West Indies, Mauritius, the Seychelles, Baghdad, Kuwait and Bahrain. After a stint as a stuntman, Caldinez gradually became an actor, appearing in film and television productions.

== Career ==
Caldinez appeared as various Ice Warriors on the British programme Doctor Who and also in films such as The Man with the Golden Gun, Raiders of the Lost Ark, Ali G Indahouse, Arabian Adventure and The Fifth Element.

Caldinez played Ice Warriors in all four of the classic Doctor Who serials in which they appeared. His Ice Warrior roles include Turoc from The Ice Warriors, an unnamed Ice Warrior in The Seeds of Death, Ssorg in The Curse of Peladon and Sskel in The Monster of Peladon. He also appeared as Kemel in The Evil of the Daleks. Other television roles include Abdullah in Sexton Blake and the mulatto in The Return of Sherlock Holmes (episode "Wisteria Lodge").. He played Surinder's father in Season 1 Episode 3 of Mind Your Language.

Another career venture in the 1980s saw Caldinez become a bodyguard for pop singers including Terence Trent D'Arby, Sade, Michael Jackson and Janet Jackson.

Caldinez died in the UK on 12 April 2022.

== Filmography ==
- A Challenge for Robin Hood (1967) – Wrestler (uncredited)
- White Cargo (1973) – Bodyguard
- The Man with the Golden Gun (1974) – Kra (uncredited)
- The Fosters – Series 2, Episode 1: "The Nude" (1977) – Clyde Davies
- Mind Your Language – (TV series) Season 1, episode 4 – Surinder's father (1977)
- Arabian Adventure (1979) – Nubian
- Raiders of the Lost Ark (1981) – Mean Mongolian
- The Fifth Element (1997) – Emperor Kodar Japhet
- Ali G Indahouse (2002) – Ambassador (uncredited)
