= Brian Hayles =

Television and film writer (1931–1978)

- Hayles in 1968
- Born: Brian Leonard Hayles; 7 March 1931; Portsmouth, Hampshire, England
- Died: 30 October 1978 (aged 47); Coventry, England
- Occupation: Writer

Brian Leonard Hayles (7 March 1931 – 30 October 1978) was an English television and film writer, most notably for the BBC science fiction series Doctor Who.

== Doctor Who ==
Hayles wrote six stories for Doctor Who and is best known for his creation of the Celestial Toymaker in the 1966 story of the same name, the Ice Warriors, introduced in the 1967 story of the same name, and the feudal planet Peladon, the setting for The Curse of Peladon and its sequel The Monster of Peladon. His other stories were The Smugglers and The Seeds of Death.

== Novels ==
In addition to script writing for the radio series The Archers, Hayles penned a novel based on the soap called Spring at Brookfield (Tandem, 1975) set in the period between the two world wars. His other books included novelisations of his Doctor Who serials The Curse of Peladon (Target, 1974) and The Ice Warriors (Target, 1976), an adaptation of his scripts for the BBC drama The Moon Stallion (Mirror Books, 1978), and two horror plays for children, The Curse of the Labyrinth (Dobson, 1976) and Hour of the Werewolf (Dobson, 1976). In 1979, NEL published, posthumously, his original novel Goldhawk, a heist-thriller set around Heathrow Airport.

== Writing ==
Apart from Doctor Who, Hayles wrote for such television series as The Regiment, Barlow at Large, Doomwatch, Out of the Unknown, United!, Legend of Death, Public Eye, Z-Cars, BBC Playhouse, The Wednesday Thriller and Suspense. He also wrote the screenplays for the feature films Nothing But the Night (1972) and Warlords of Atlantis (1978). The novelisation of the latter by Paul Victor (Futura, 1978) included a preface by Hayles entitled 'The Thinking Behind Atlantis' in which he explained the origins of the film's central concepts. Hayles contributed to a BBC series called Slim John which was an English Language course taught via the medium of science fiction scenarios.

Hayles's final screenplay was for Arabian Adventure (1979), which he completed shortly before his death on 30 October 1978. The novelisation of the film by Keith Miles (Mirror Books, 1979) was dedicated to his memory.

== See also ==
- List of unmade Doctor Who serials and films
- Category:Works by Brian Hayles
