= George Waring (actor) =

English actor (1925–2010)

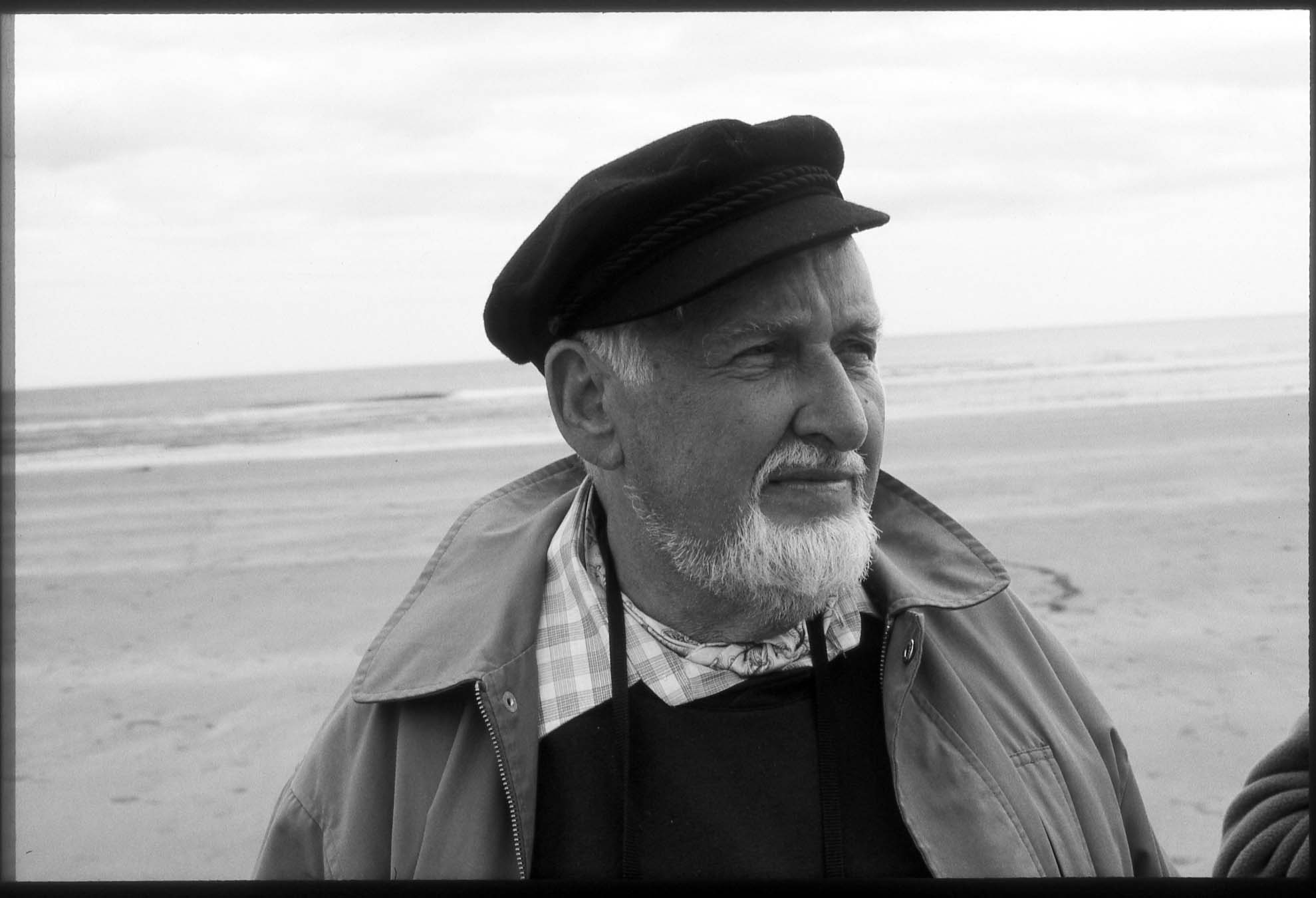
- Waring on holiday in Ireland c. 1998
- Born: George Edward Waring; 20 February 1925; Eccles, Lancashire, England
- Died: 15 February 2010 (aged 84); Poole, Dorset, England
- Occupation: Actor
- Years active: 1962–2000
- Spouse(s): Gerty Lave (divorced); Geraldine Gwyther (1960–2010)

George Waring (20 February 1925 – 15 February 2010) was a British television actor from 1962 to 2000. He also had occasional feature film credits. He was best known for appearing on Coronation Street as Arnold Swain, the bigamist husband of Emily Bishop in 1980. Earlier in the 1970s he appeared in Crown Court, the long running ITV courtroom drama series. He also appeared in episodes of Doctor Who in 1967.

He attended Ducie High School, Manchester and joined the Royal Air Force at the age of 18. After acting with a service repertory company in Europe he had various jobs, worked in repertory theatres in England and appeared in West End plays including Alfie in 1963.

== Filmography ==
Year	Title	Role	Notes
1963	The Hi-Jackers	Visiting Room Prisoner	
1964	Nothing But the Best	Police Inspector in Play	Uncredited
1976	Dickens of London	Huffam	3 episodes
1978	Tarka the Otter	Farm Labourer	
1986	God's Outlaw	Bishop Tunstall	
