= Climping Beach =

Beach in West Sussex, England

Coordinates: 50.798°N 0.572°W

- Site of Special Scientific Interest
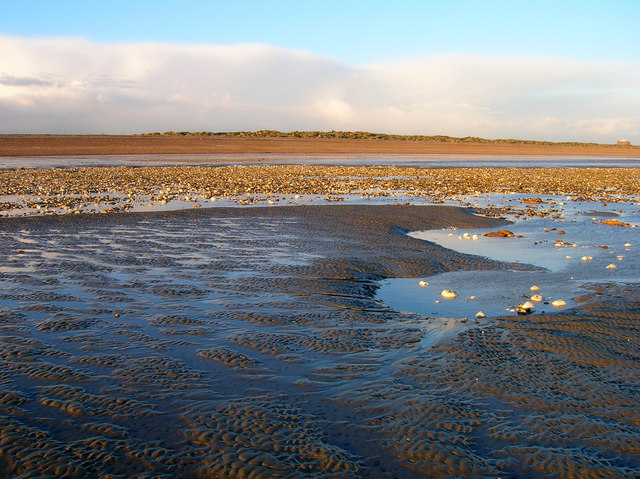
- Location of Climping Beach.
- Area of search: West Sussex
- Grid reference: TQ 021 010
- Interest: Biological
- Area: 32.1 hectares (79 acres)
- Notification date: 1985
- Location map: Magic Map

Climping Beach is a 32.1-hectare (79-acre) biological Site of Special Scientific Interest west of Littlehampton in West Sussex. The eastern half is designated a Local Nature Reserve called West Beach.

This stretch of shoreline has sand dunes at the back with a vegetated shingle beach, which is a nationally uncommon habitat, in front. The intertidal zone has soft muds and sands with many invertebrates, which are an important source of food for wintering birds, especially sanderling.
