= Beryozovka (Kolyma) =

Location
- Country: Russia

Physical characteristics
- Source
  - location: Yukaghir Highlands
- Mouth: Kolyma
  - coordinates: 67.6148°N 155.4736°E
- Length: 517 km (321 mi)
- Basin size: 28,400 km^{2} (11,000 sq mi)

Basin features
- Progression: Kolyma→ East Siberian Sea

The Beryozovka (Russian: Берёзовка) is a river in Sakha Republic, Russia. It is a right tributary of the Kolyma. Its source is in the Yukaghir Highlands. It is 517 kilometres (321 mi) long, and has a drainage basin of 28,400 square kilometres (11,000 sq mi).
