= Derek Martinus =

- Born: Derek Buitenhuis; 4 April 1931; Ilford, Essex, United Kingdom
- Died: 27 March 2014 (aged 82); United Kingdom
- Occupation(s): Actor, director
- Years active: 1950s–1986
- Notable work: Z-Cars, Doctor Who
- Spouse: Eivor Olausson (m. 1963)
- Children: 2

Derek Buitenhuis (4 April 1931 – 27 March 2014), known professionally as Derek Martinus, was an English television and theatre director. Originally an actor, he directed episodes of Z-Cars and Doctor Who, for which he was best known. He also had a long career directing stage productions.

== Early life and acting career ==
Born in Ilford, Essex, the son of Jack and Irene Buitenhuis, Martinus used his Rotterdam-born grandfather's middle name for his professional name.

Martinus was educated at Brentwood School, Essex. After national service in the Royal Air Force, he studied directing and acting at the University of Oklahoma and Yale School of Drama. After running out of money, he returned to the UK in the mid-1950s and worked as an actor for the Library Theatre, Manchester and other repertory theatres. He played at the Royal Court and on tour, with among others, Sir Donald Wolfit. He subsequently joined the Arena Theatre Company, where he worked as both an actor and director.

In 1959 he took a study tour of Scandinavian theatre and met his future wife, Eivor – who was only sixteen at the time – in Gothenburg. He directed some 20 plays at The Pembroke Theatre-in-the-round from 1959 until the theatre closed because of road widening. His two best received parts were Monsewer in Brendan Behan's The Hostage and Malvolio in Twelfth Night which he played on several occasions. Between jobs in the theatre he did several productions at the Royal Academy of Dramatic Art and the Guildhall School of Music and Drama.

== Directing career and later life ==
For the BBC he directed several Doctor Who serials, Galaxy 4 (1965), Mission to the Unknown (1965), The Tenth Planet (1966), The Evil of the Daleks (1967), and The Ice Warriors (also 1967). His final serial for the programme, Spearhead from Space (1970), was also the first to be made in colour. His period working on the programme spanned the eras of the first three actors to play the lead role. Martinus believed the Daleks had to be shot "very carefully and from exactly the right angle". "If you shoot them without care they do look rather tame and ordinary," he explained in an interview for a series fan site. "You had to build up a Dalek's entrance. I used to make them lurk in the shadows."

Martinus also directed the Blake's 7 episodes "Trial" and "The Keeper" (both 1979) and over 50 episodes of Z-Cars. He worked on classic serials too, What Maisie Knew (1968), The Black Tulip (1970), A Little Princess, (1973) and A Legacy (1975), plus the dramatisation of a 1970s historical fiction best seller, Penmarric.

For ITV he directed The Paper Lads in 1977, winner of the Pye Award for best children's drama. In addition, Martinus directed the army drama series Spearhead, and several series of the children's drama Dodger, Bonzo and the rest in 1985 which also won the Pye Award.

For Swedish television he directed a two-hour political thriller by Jan Guillou, The Wolf. After having learnt Swedish, he directed several plays in civic theatres in Sweden, many of them translated or adapted by his wife. Among others: The Homecoming by Harold Pinter, Volpone by Ben Jonson, The Shoemaker's Holiday by Thomas Dekker, The Ragged Trousered Philanthropists (the version by Stephen Lowe) and Mad Forest by Caryl Churchill. At the Gate Theatre London he directed the British premieres of some rarely performed Strindberg plays, translated from the Swedish by his wife Eivor.

== Death ==
Martinus died on 27 March 2014 at the age of 82 from complications arising from Alzheimer's disease, from which he had suffered for many years. He was survived by his wife Eivor Martinus, their two daughters, Charlotta and Pia, and three grandchildren.
