= Doctor Who: The Early Adventures =

Audio drama series

Doctor Who: The Early Adventures is a series of audio dramas based on the British television series Doctor Who and produced by Big Finish Productions.

In February 2013, Big Finish Productions announced that, following the conclusions of The Lost Stories and the monthly Companion Chronicles, they would be launching The Early Adventures, a series of brand new stories featuring the First and Second Doctors. The four-part plays star surviving lead actors from the original series, and follow a similar structure to The Lost Stories set in this era, mixing dialogue and narration.

== Cast ==
List indicator

This section includes characters who will appear or have appeared in at least one season.

- A green cell indicates the actor is a main cast member.
- A red cell indicates the actor is a recurring cast member.
- A light blue cell indicates the actor is a guest or special guest cast member.

Actor	Character	Appearances						
Actor	Character	S1	S2	S3	S4	S5	S6	S7
William Russell	Ian Chesterton / The Doctor	✓		✓				
Carole Ann Ford	Susan Foreman	✓		✓				✓
Maureen O'Brien	Vicki	✓		✓		✓		
Peter Purves	Steven Taylor / The Doctor	✓		✓		✓	✓	✓
Jean Marsh	Sara Kingdom	✓		✓				
Frazer Hines	Jamie McCrimmon / The Doctor		✓		✓		✓	
Anneke Wills	Polly Wright		✓		✓		✓	
Elliot Chapman	Ben Jackson		✓		✓		✓	
Deborah Watling	Victoria Waterfield		✓					
Wendy Padbury	Zoe Heriot		✓		✓		✓	
Jemma Powell	Barbara Wright			✓				
Ajazz Awad	Katarina						✓	
Lauren Cornelius	Dodo Chaplet							✓

== Episodes ==
=== Series 1 (2014) ===
The first series consist of stories featuring the First Doctor. William Russell reprises the role of Ian Chesterton in the first two stories, while Peter Purves reprises the role of Steven Taylor in the second two. Carole Ann Ford plays Susan Foreman in the first story, Maureen O'Brien plays Vicki in the second and third stories, and Jean Marsh plays Sara Kingdom in the fourth. Additionally, Russell and Purves perform the Doctor's dialogue in their respective stories, while Ford and O'Brien perform the dialogue of Barbara Wright in the first two stories. The stories have individual episode titles to replicate the era.

No.	Serial title	Episode titles	Directed by	Written by	Featuring	Released
1	Domain of the Voord	"The Floating City"	Ken Bentley	Andrew Smith	First Doctor, Susan, Ian, Barbara, Voord	September 2014
1	Domain of the Voord	"Return to Terror"	Ken Bentley	Andrew Smith	First Doctor, Susan, Ian, Barbara, Voord	September 2014
1	Domain of the Voord	"Behind the Mask"	Ken Bentley	Andrew Smith	First Doctor, Susan, Ian, Barbara, Voord	September 2014
1	Domain of the Voord	"Fightback"	Ken Bentley	Andrew Smith	First Doctor, Susan, Ian, Barbara, Voord	September 2014
2	The Doctor's Tale	"The Lord of Misrule"	Ken Bentley	Marc Platt	First Doctor, Ian, Barbara, Vicki	October 2014
2	The Doctor's Tale	"The White Hart"	Ken Bentley	Marc Platt	First Doctor, Ian, Barbara, Vicki	October 2014
2	The Doctor's Tale	"Sanctuary"	Ken Bentley	Marc Platt	First Doctor, Ian, Barbara, Vicki	October 2014
2	The Doctor's Tale	"The Empty Crown"	Ken Bentley	Marc Platt	First Doctor, Ian, Barbara, Vicki	October 2014
3	The Bounty of Ceres	"The Hostile Planet"	Lisa Bowerman	Ian Potter	First Doctor, Vicki, Steven	November 2014
3	The Bounty of Ceres	"The Outer Edge"	Lisa Bowerman	Ian Potter	First Doctor, Vicki, Steven	November 2014
3	The Bounty of Ceres	"An Otherworldly Intelligence"	Lisa Bowerman	Ian Potter	First Doctor, Vicki, Steven	November 2014
3	The Bounty of Ceres	"The Coldest Mind"	Lisa Bowerman	Ian Potter	First Doctor, Vicki, Steven	November 2014
4	An Ordinary Life	"An Ordinary Life"	Ken Bentley	Matt Fitton	First Doctor, Steven, Sara	December 2014
4	An Ordinary Life	"The Unalike"	Ken Bentley	Matt Fitton	First Doctor, Steven, Sara	December 2014
4	An Ordinary Life	"The Sleeping Army"	Ken Bentley	Matt Fitton	First Doctor, Steven, Sara	December 2014
4	An Ordinary Life	"The Enemy Without"	Ken Bentley	Matt Fitton	First Doctor, Steven, Sara	December 2014

=== Series 2 (2015–16) ===
The second series consists of stories featuring the Second Doctor, played in all four stories by Frazer Hines, who also reprises his original role from the series as the Doctor's companion Jamie McCrimmon. Anneke Wills reprises her role as Polly Wright in the first two stories, Deborah Watling reprises the role of Victoria Waterfield in the third story, and Wendy Padbury reprises the role of Zoe Heriot in the fourth. In addition, the first two stories feature Elliot Chapman as Ben Jackson, originally played by Michael Craze.

No.	Title	Directed by	Written by	Featuring	Released
1	"The Yes Men"	Lisa Bowerman	Simon Guerrier	Second Doctor, Polly, Ben, Jamie	September 2015
2	"The Forsaken"	Lisa Bowerman	Justin Richards	Second Doctor, Polly, Ben, Jamie	October 2015
3	"The Black Hole"	Lisa Bowerman	Simon Guerrier	Second Doctor, Jamie, Victoria, the Monk	November 2015
4	"The Isos Network"	Nicholas Briggs	Nicholas Briggs	Second Doctor, Jamie, Zoe, Cybermen	January 2016

=== Series 3 (2016) ===
The third series of the Early Adventures saw Carole Ann Ford, William Russell, Maureen O'Brien, Peter Purves and Jean Marsh reprising their roles as the companions of the First Doctor, joined by Jemma Powell as Barbara Wright, who had previously portrayed the role of original Barbara actress Jacqueline Hill in the 2013 drama An Adventure in Space and Time, and Dan Starkey as the Sontarans. The second story also features actor James Joyce in the role of a new companion, Jospa. The stories have individual episode titles to replicate the era.

No.	Serial title	Episode titles	Directed by	Written by	Featuring	Released
1	The Age of Endurance	"Ship of Death"	Ken Bentley	Nick Wallace	First Doctor, Susan, Ian, Barbara	September 2016
1	The Age of Endurance	"Hunters in the Breach"	Ken Bentley	Nick Wallace	First Doctor, Susan, Ian, Barbara	September 2016
1	The Age of Endurance	"A Fight for Survival"	Ken Bentley	Nick Wallace	First Doctor, Susan, Ian, Barbara	September 2016
1	The Age of Endurance	"The End of Endurance"	Ken Bentley	Nick Wallace	First Doctor, Susan, Ian, Barbara	September 2016
2	The Fifth Traveller	"Hunted"	Lisa Bowerman	Philip Lawrence	First Doctor, Ian, Barbara, Vicki, Jospa	October 2016
2	The Fifth Traveller	"Enemy in the Dark"	Lisa Bowerman	Philip Lawrence	First Doctor, Ian, Barbara, Vicki, Jospa	October 2016
2	The Fifth Traveller	"The Sleeping Army"	Lisa Bowerman	Philip Lawrence	First Doctor, Ian, Barbara, Vicki, Jospa	October 2016
2	The Fifth Traveller	"The Boy"	Lisa Bowerman	Philip Lawrence	First Doctor, Ian, Barbara, Vicki, Jospa	October 2016
3	The Ravelli Conspiracy	"A Friend in Need"	Lisa Bowerman	Robert Khan & Tom Salinsky	First Doctor, Vicki, Steven	November 2016
3	The Ravelli Conspiracy	"A Friend in Deed"	Lisa Bowerman	Robert Khan & Tom Salinsky	First Doctor, Vicki, Steven	November 2016
3	The Ravelli Conspiracy	"With Friends Like These..."	Lisa Bowerman	Robert Khan & Tom Salinsky	First Doctor, Vicki, Steven	November 2016
3	The Ravelli Conspiracy	"Who Needs Enemies"	Lisa Bowerman	Robert Khan & Tom Salinsky	First Doctor, Vicki, Steven	November 2016
4	The Sontarans	"The Sontarans"	Lisa Bowerman	Simon Guerrier	First Doctor, Steven, Sara, Sontarans	December 2016
4	The Sontarans	"The Descent"	Lisa Bowerman	Simon Guerrier	First Doctor, Steven, Sara, Sontarans	December 2016
4	The Sontarans	"The Blind City"	Lisa Bowerman	Simon Guerrier	First Doctor, Steven, Sara, Sontarans	December 2016
4	The Sontarans	"The Rule of War"	Lisa Bowerman	Simon Guerrier	First Doctor, Steven, Sara, Sontarans	December 2016

=== Series 4 (2017) ===
Frazer Hines, Anneke Wills, Elliot Chapman and Wendy Padbury reprise their roles as the Doctor's companions, with Frazer Hines also playing the Second Doctor. Other characters are also played by Anjella Mackintosh, Wanda Opalinska, Kristina Buikaite, Alistair Petrie, Debbie Chazen, Matilda Ziegler, David Sibley, Kerry Gooderson, Ewan Bailey, Alan Blyton, Judith Roddy, Adam Newington, Don McCorkindale, Richenda Carey.

No.	Title	Directed by	Written by	Featuring	Released
1	"The Night Witches"	Helen Goldwyn	Roland Moore	Second Doctor, Polly, Ben, Jamie	September 2017
2	"The Outliers"	Lisa Bowerman	Simon Guerrier	Second Doctor, Polly, Ben, Jamie	October 2017
3	"The Morton Legacy"	Lisa Bowerman	Justin Richards	Second Doctor, Polly, Ben, Jamie	November 2017
4	"The Wreck of the World"	Lisa Bowerman	Timothy X Atack	Second Doctor, Jamie, Zoe	December 2017

=== Series 5 (2018) ===
Series 5 was written and marketed as a "season" of episodes, where each story directly follows from the one before it. Peter Purves returned as Steven Taylor and provided the voice of the First Doctor. Maureen O'Brien returned as Vicki. This season featured the first appearance of the Daleks in the Early Adventures range. The stories have individual episode titles to replicate the era.

No.	Serial title	Episode titles	Directed by	Written by	Featuring	Released
1	The Dalek Occupation of Winter	"The Chosen Few"	Lisa Bowerman	David K Barnes	First Doctor, Vicki, Steven, Daleks	September 2018
1	The Dalek Occupation of Winter	"Keep Your Enemies Close"	Lisa Bowerman	David K Barnes	First Doctor, Vicki, Steven, Daleks	September 2018
1	The Dalek Occupation of Winter	"The Blood of the Young"	Lisa Bowerman	David K Barnes	First Doctor, Vicki, Steven, Daleks	September 2018
1	The Dalek Occupation of Winter	"A Spark to Light a Flame"	Lisa Bowerman	David K Barnes	First Doctor, Vicki, Steven, Daleks	September 2018
2	An Ideal World	"The Weather Makers"	Lisa Bowerman	Ian Potter	First Doctor, Vicki, Steven	October 2018
2	An Ideal World	"The Life Below"	Lisa Bowerman	Ian Potter	First Doctor, Vicki, Steven	October 2018
2	An Ideal World	"A World in Revolt"	Lisa Bowerman	Ian Potter	First Doctor, Vicki, Steven	October 2018
2	An Ideal World	"A Fight for the Future"	Lisa Bowerman	Ian Potter	First Doctor, Vicki, Steven	October 2018
3	Entanglement	"The Wall of Death"	Lisa Bowerman	Robert Khan & Thomas Salinsky	First Doctor, Vicki, Steven	November 2018
3	Entanglement	"Photographic Evidence"	Lisa Bowerman	Robert Khan & Thomas Salinsky	First Doctor, Vicki, Steven	November 2018
3	Entanglement	"The Hour of Voting"	Lisa Bowerman	Robert Khan & Thomas Salinsky	First Doctor, Vicki, Steven	November 2018
3	Entanglement	"The Entanglement Machine"	Lisa Bowerman	Robert Khan & Thomas Salinsky	First Doctor, Vicki, Steven	November 2018
4	The Crash of the UK-201	"Return to Yesterday"	Lisa Bowerman	Jonathan Morris	First Doctor, Vicki, Steven	December 2018
4	The Crash of the UK-201	"The Road Not Taken"	Lisa Bowerman	Jonathan Morris	First Doctor, Vicki, Steven	December 2018
4	The Crash of the UK-201	"Bid Time Return"	Lisa Bowerman	Jonathan Morris	First Doctor, Vicki, Steven	December 2018
4	The Crash of the UK-201	"The Crash"	Lisa Bowerman	Jonathan Morris	First Doctor, Vicki, Steven	December 2018

=== Series 6 (2019) ===
Series 6 was created as part of Big Finish's celebration of their 20th anniversary of publishing Doctor Who audio dramas. The series features a number of firsts for the range, including the first story to feature multiple Doctors and the first story to feature the Master. In a first for any performed Doctor Who media, this series also features the return of companion Katarina and the first performed story featuring the Second Doctor meeting the Master.

No.	Title	Directed by	Written by	Featuring	Released
1	"The Home Guard"	Lisa Bowerman	Simon Guerrier	Second Doctor, Polly, Jamie, Ben, The Master	November 2019
2	"Daughter of the Gods"	Lisa Bowerman	David K Barnes	First Doctor, Second Doctor, Zoe, Jamie, Katarina, Steven	November 2019

=== Series 7 (2021) ===
No.	Serial title	Episode titles	Directed by	Written by	Featuring	Released
1	After the Daleks	"A New Life"	Lisa Bowerman	Roland Moore	Susan, David Campbell, Jenny Chaplin, Daleks	August 2021
1	After the Daleks	"The Balance of Power"	Lisa Bowerman	Roland Moore	Susan, David Campbell, Jenny Chaplin, Daleks	August 2021
1	After the Daleks	"Salvation of the Robomen"	Lisa Bowerman	Roland Moore	Susan, David Campbell, Jenny Chaplin, Daleks	August 2021
1	After the Daleks	"Susan's Choice"	Lisa Bowerman	Roland Moore	Susan, David Campbell, Jenny Chaplin, Daleks	August 2021
2	The Secrets of Det-Sen	"The Abominable Snowmen"	Lisa Bowerman	Andy Frankham-Allen	First Doctor, Steven, Dodo, Yeti	August 2021
2	The Secrets of Det-Sen	"Guru Rinpoche Day"	Lisa Bowerman	Andy Frankham-Allen	First Doctor, Steven, Dodo, Yeti	August 2021
2	The Secrets of Det-Sen	"The Bandits"	Lisa Bowerman	Andy Frankham-Allen	First Doctor, Steven, Dodo, Yeti	August 2021
2	The Secrets of Det-Sen	"The Ghanta of Det-Sen"	Lisa Bowerman	Andy Frankham-Allen	First Doctor, Steven, Dodo, Yeti	August 2021
