= Doctor Who: The First Doctor Adventures =

British audio play series

The First Doctor Adventures

Big Finish Productions audio drama
- Series: Doctor Who
- Featuring: First Doctor; Susan Foreman; Ian Chesterton; Barbara Wright; Dodo Chaplet; Vicki
- Written by: various
- Directed by: Nicholas Briggs
- Executive producers: Jason Haigh-Ellery; Nicholas Briggs
- Release date: December 2017 - present

The First Doctor Adventures is a Big Finish Productions audio play series based on the British television programme Doctor Who. It sees David Bradley and Stephen Noonan as the First Doctor, a role originated by William Hartnell from 1963 to 1966, as well as by Bradley on television in the episodes "The Doctor Falls", "Twice Upon a Time", and "The Power of the Doctor".

== History ==
Beginning in 2017, it was announced that actor David Bradley would portray the First Doctor, a role originated by William Hartnell from 1963 to 1966, as well as by Bradley on television in the episodes "The Doctor Falls" and "Twice Upon a Time". David Bradley also portrayed William Hartnell in the BBC bio-drama An Adventure in Space and Time.

Also appearing are Claudia Grant as Susan Foreman, Jemma Powell as Barbara Wright and Jamie Glover as Ian Chesterton. These three actors also appeared alongside Bradley in the aforementioned BBC bio-drama. James Dreyfus joins the cast as an earlier incarnation of The Master prior to Roger Delgado.

Announced in September 2017, the first pair of stories was released on 25 December 2017, with a second pair released in July 2018. Confirmed in July 2018, a third duo was released in January 2019. The fourth and fifth volumes were announced in 2019 and 2021 respectively.

In May 2020, Big Finish announced that the Main Range would conclude with in March 2021, to be replaced with regular releases of each Doctor in their own boxsets throughout the year in 2022. A single boxset for the First Doctor was announced in May 2021, set for release in April 2022. Executive Producer, Nicholas Briggs in response to a fan letter stated in the February 2022 issue of Vortex Magazine, "the new First Doctor range will feature an actor new to the role of the Doctor and he is, I assure you, amazing!". On 11 February 2022, Big Finish announced that Stephen Noonan will be portraying the First Doctor alongside Lauren Cornelius.

== Cast ==
List indicator

This section includes characters who will appear or have appeared in at least one season.

- A green cell indicates the actor is a main cast member.
- A red cell indicates the actor is a recurring cast member.
- A light blue cell indicates the actor is a guest or special guest cast member.

Actor	Character	Appearances									
Actor	Character	V1	V2	V3	V4	V5	S1	S2	S3	S4	S5
David Bradley	The Doctor	✓	✓	✓	✓	✓					
Stephen Noonan	The Doctor						✓	✓	✓	✓	✓
Claudia Grant	Susan Foreman	✓	✓	✓	✓	✓					
Carole Ann Ford	Susan Foreman			✓							
Jemma Powell	Barbara Wright	✓	✓	✓	✓	✓					
Jamie Glover	Ian Chesterton	✓	✓	✓	✓	✓					
James Dreyfus	The Master	✓									
Lauren Cornellius	Dodo Chaplet						✓	✓	✓	✓	✓
Maureen O'Brien	Vicki								✓		
Peter Purves	Steven Taylor									✓	
Anneke Wills	Polly Wright										✓
Rufus Hound	The Monk						✓				
Nicholas Briggs	The Daleks				✓				✓		

== Episodes ==
Individual episodes have titles, reflecting the practice of the programme in the 1960s when William Hartnell played the First Doctor.

=== Adventures starring David Bradley (2017–2021) ===
These stories are set somewhere after the Season 1 story The Reign of Terror and before the Season 2 story Planet of Giants.

==== Volume 1 (2017) ====
No.	Serial title	Episode title	Directed by	Written by	Featuring	Released
1	The Destination Wars	"Journey to the Future"	Nicholas Briggs	Matt Fitton	First Doctor, Susan, Ian, Barbara, The Master	December 2017
1	The Destination Wars	"The Father of Invention"	Nicholas Briggs	Matt Fitton	First Doctor, Susan, Ian, Barbara, The Master	December 2017
1	The Destination Wars	"The Destination Wars"	Nicholas Briggs	Matt Fitton	First Doctor, Susan, Ian, Barbara, The Master	December 2017
1	The Destination Wars	"Prisoners of Time"	Nicholas Briggs	Matt Fitton	First Doctor, Susan, Ian, Barbara, The Master	December 2017
Arriving on the distant planet Destination, the TARDIS crew learn that the humanoid colonists on this planet are at war with the lizard-like locals, this conflict being manipulated by the mysterious 'Inventor'. While the Doctor researches the history of the conflict, Ian and Susan meet the Inventor, who Susan recognizes as an old friend of her grandfather's...
2	The Great White Hurricane	"The Coming Storm"	Nicholas Briggs	Guy Adams	First Doctor, Susan, Ian, Barbara	December 2017
2	The Great White Hurricane	"The Frozen City"	Nicholas Briggs	Guy Adams	First Doctor, Susan, Ian, Barbara	December 2017
2	The Great White Hurricane	"The Killer in the Snow"	Nicholas Briggs	Guy Adams	First Doctor, Susan, Ian, Barbara	December 2017
2	The Great White Hurricane	"River of Doom"	Nicholas Briggs	Guy Adams	First Doctor, Susan, Ian, Barbara	December 2017
When the TARDIS materializes in New York, the crew are immediately caught up in a gang war when Ian is grazed by a stray bullet and Susan is taken hostage by a fleeing gang member. Barbara accompanies Ian to hospital while the Doctor tries to prompt the police to help him find Susan, but Barbara soon realizes that they are in great danger as they have arrived on the date of the 'Great White Hurricane' that struck New York.

==== Volume 2 (2018) ====
No.	Serial title	Episode title	Directed by	Written by	Featuring	Released
1	The Invention of Death	"A World Without Fear"	Nicholas Briggs	John Dorney	First Doctor, Susan, Ian, Barbara	July 2018
1	The Invention of Death	"The First"	Nicholas Briggs	John Dorney	First Doctor, Susan, Ian, Barbara	July 2018
1	The Invention of Death	"The Dying Art"	Nicholas Briggs	John Dorney	First Doctor, Susan, Ian, Barbara	July 2018
1	The Invention of Death	"The Invention of Life"	Nicholas Briggs	John Dorney	First Doctor, Susan, Ian, Barbara	July 2018
The TARDIS arrives on Ashtallah, a world populated by large, sentient single-celled organisms, but their presence unwittingly introduces new concepts to this civilization.
2	The Barbarians and the Samurai	"The Forbidden Land"	Nicholas Briggs	Andrew Smith	First Doctor, Susan, Ian, Barbara	July 2018
2	The Barbarians and the Samurai	"Barbarians Among Us"	Nicholas Briggs	Andrew Smith	First Doctor, Susan, Ian, Barbara	July 2018
2	The Barbarians and the Samurai	"Power Play"	Nicholas Briggs	Andrew Smith	First Doctor, Susan, Ian, Barbara	July 2018
2	The Barbarians and the Samurai	"Fall of the Samurai"	Nicholas Briggs	Andrew Smith	First Doctor, Susan, Ian, Barbara	July 2018
Arriving in nineteenth century Japan, the TARDIS crew are separated and caught up in the political turmoil of the era.

==== Volume 3 (2019) ====
No.	Serial title	Episode title	Directed by	Written by	Featuring	Released
1	The Phoenicians	"The Purple and the Gold"	Ken Bentley	Marc Platt	First Doctor, Susan, Ian, Barbara	January 2019
1	The Phoenicians	"The Hireling"	Ken Bentley	Marc Platt	First Doctor, Susan, Ian, Barbara	January 2019
1	The Phoenicians	"Legends and Lies"	Ken Bentley	Marc Platt	First Doctor, Susan, Ian, Barbara	January 2019
1	The Phoenicians	"The Bull's Hide"	Ken Bentley	Marc Platt	First Doctor, Susan, Ian, Barbara	January 2019
The TARDIS crew become caught in the political machinations of the Phoenican Empire after landing in Tyre, to the extent that Ian becomes the new favourite of the princess.
2	Tick-Tock World	"The Graveyard World"	Ken Bentley	Guy Adams	First Doctor, Susan, Ian, Barbara, Old Susan	January 2019
2	Tick-Tock World	"The Time Ship"	Ken Bentley	Guy Adams	First Doctor, Susan, Ian, Barbara, Old Susan	January 2019
2	Tick-Tock World	"Death in Time"	Ken Bentley	Guy Adams	First Doctor, Susan, Ian, Barbara, Old Susan	January 2019
2	Tick-Tock World	"Feast of the Xesto"	Ken Bentley	Guy Adams	First Doctor, Susan, Ian, Barbara, Old Susan	January 2019
Trapped on a world where Time has become twisted and distorted following the destruction of the TARDIS, the crew's only hope of escape is a mysteriously familiar old woman...

==== Volume 4 (2020) ====
No.	Serial title	Episode title	Directed by	Written by	Featuring	Released
1	Return to Skaro	"The Towers of Skaro"	Ken Bentley	Andrew Smith	First Doctor, Susan, Ian, Barbara, Daleks, Thals	March 2020
1	Return to Skaro	"The Hidden Enemy"	Ken Bentley	Andrew Smith	First Doctor, Susan, Ian, Barbara, Daleks, Thals	March 2020
1	Return to Skaro	"Friend or Foe?"	Ken Bentley	Andrew Smith	First Doctor, Susan, Ian, Barbara, Daleks, Thals	March 2020
1	Return to Skaro	"Death to the Thals!"	Ken Bentley	Andrew Smith	First Doctor, Susan, Ian, Barbara, Daleks, Thals	March 2020
The Doctor's latest attempt to take Ian and Barbara home takes the TARDIS back to Skaro, but as the crew admire the growth of Thal civilisation, it becomes clear that the Daleks aren't as dead as everyone believes...
2	Last of the Romanovs	"The Shattered Pane"	Ken Bentley	Jonathan Barnes	First Doctor, Susan, Ian, Barbara	March 2020
2	Last of the Romanovs	"The House of Special Purpose"	Ken Bentley	Jonathan Barnes	First Doctor, Susan, Ian, Barbara	March 2020
2	Last of the Romanovs	"The Execution Order"	Ken Bentley	Jonathan Barnes	First Doctor, Susan, Ian, Barbara	March 2020
2	Last of the Romanovs	"The Waiting Cellar"	Ken Bentley	Jonathan Barnes	First Doctor, Susan, Ian, Barbara	March 2020
The TARDIS materialises in Russia in 1917, and the Doctor is forced to face the human consequences of his inability to interfere in history.

==== Volume 5 (2021) ====
No.	Serial title	Episode title	Directed by	Written by	Featuring	Released
1	For the Glory of Urth	"For The Glory of Urth"	Ken Bentley	Guy Adams	First Doctor, Susan, Ian, Barbara	April 2021
1	For the Glory of Urth	"A Place of Angels"	Ken Bentley	Guy Adams	First Doctor, Susan, Ian, Barbara	April 2021
1	For the Glory of Urth	"The Toxicity of Dissent"	Ken Bentley	Guy Adams	First Doctor, Susan, Ian, Barbara	April 2021
1	For the Glory of Urth	"Flowers of Iron"	Ken Bentley	Guy Adams	First Doctor, Susan, Ian, Barbara	April 2021
2	The Hollow Crown	"The Winter of Discontent"	Ken Bentley	Sarah Grochala	First Doctor, Susan, Ian, Barbara	April 2021
2	The Hollow Crown	"The Play's the Thing"	Ken Bentley	Sarah Grochala	First Doctor, Susan, Ian, Barbara	April 2021
2	The Hollow Crown	"The Drums of War"	Ken Bentley	Sarah Grochala	First Doctor, Susan, Ian, Barbara	April 2021
2	The Hollow Crown	"The Hollow Crown"	Ken Bentley	Sarah Grochala	First Doctor, Susan, Ian, Barbara	April 2021

==== Continuation ====
In April 2022, Executive Producer Nicholas Briggs expressed interest in producing further stories with Bradley. In Issue 167 of Big Finish's magazine Vortex, Briggs teased further stories featuring Bradley's portrayal, saying "We've some very exciting plans afoot for further stories with David Bradley — something quite out of the ordinary and rather delightful. On 17 April 2024, it was announced Bradley would continue to play a new alternate version of the First Doctor alongside Powell, Glover and Grant as alternate versions of their respective characters but now as part of the Unbound range instead, in a series titled The First Doctor Unbound.

=== Adventures starring Stephen Noonan (2022–present) ===
These stories are set between the Season 3 stories The Savages and The War Machines.

==== Series 1: The Outlaws (2022) ====
No.	Title	Directed by	Written by	Featuring	Released
1	"The Outlaws"	Nicholas Briggs	Lizbeth Myles	First Doctor, Dodo, The Monk	April 2022
2	"The Miniaturist"	Nicholas Briggs	Lizzie Hopley	First Doctor, Dodo	April 2022

==== Series 2: The Demon Song (2023) ====
No.	Title	Directed by	Written by	Featuring	Released
1	"The Demon Song"	Nicholas Briggs	Robert Ayres	First Doctor, Dodo	February 2023
2	"The Incherton Incident"	Nicholas Briggs	Nicholas Briggs	First Doctor, Dodo	February 2023

==== Series 3: Fugitive of the Daleks (2024) ====
No.	Title	Directed by	Written by	Featuring	Released
1	"Part 1"	Nicholas Briggs	Jonathan Morris	First Doctor, Dodo, Vicki, Daleks	January 2024
2	"Part 2"	Nicholas Briggs	Jonathan Morris	First Doctor, Dodo, Vicki, Daleks	January 2024
3	"Part 3"	Nicholas Briggs	Jonathan Morris	First Doctor, Dodo, Vicki, Daleks	January 2024
4	"Part 4"	Nicholas Briggs	Jonathan Morris	First Doctor, Dodo, Vicki, Daleks	January 2024
5	"Part 5"	Nicholas Briggs	Jonathan Morris	First Doctor, Dodo, Vicki, Daleks	January 2024
6	"Part 6"	Nicholas Briggs	Jonathan Morris	First Doctor, Dodo, Vicki, Daleks	January 2024

==== Series 4: The Living Darkness (2025) ====
On 23 May 2024, Big Finish announced their slate of boxsets for 2025. Nicholas Briggs said: “All our writers, directors, script editors and producers continue to work tirelessly to create exciting new adventures for all our Doctors. The First Doctor continues his strange encounters with past companions, with an absolute corker by Jacqueline Rayner, already recorded and in post-production." The release is set for January 2025.

No.	Title	Directed by	Written by	Featuring	Released
1	"Part 1"	Helen Goldwyn	Jacqueline Rayner	First Doctor, Dodo, Steven Taylor	January 2025
2	"Part 2"	Helen Goldwyn	Jacqueline Rayner	First Doctor, Dodo, Steven Taylor	January 2025
3	"Part 3"	Helen Goldwyn	Jacqueline Rayner	First Doctor, Dodo, Steven Taylor	January 2025
4	"Part 4"	Helen Goldwyn	Jacqueline Rayner	First Doctor, Dodo, Steven Taylor	January 2025
5	"Part 5"	Helen Goldwyn	Jacqueline Rayner	First Doctor, Dodo, Steven Taylor	January 2025
6	"Part 6"	Helen Goldwyn	Jacqueline Rayner	First Doctor, Dodo, Steven Taylor	January 2025

==== Series 5: Beware the City of Illusions (2026) ====
No.	Title	Directed by	Written by	Featuring	Released
1	"Part 1"	Nicholas Briggs	Nicholas Briggs	First Doctor, Dodo, Polly Wright	January 2026
2	"Part 2"	Nicholas Briggs	Nicholas Briggs	First Doctor, Dodo, Polly Wright	January 2026
3	"Part 3"	Nicholas Briggs	Nicholas Briggs	First Doctor, Dodo, Polly Wright	January 2026
4	"Part 4"	Nicholas Briggs	Nicholas Briggs	First Doctor, Dodo, Polly Wright	January 2026
5	"Part 5"	Nicholas Briggs	Nicholas Briggs	First Doctor, Dodo, Polly Wright	January 2026
6	"Part 6"	Nicholas Briggs	Nicholas Briggs	First Doctor, Dodo, Polly Wright	January 2026

== Awards and nominations ==
Name of the award ceremony, year presented, category, nominee(s) of the award, and the result of the nomination
Award ceremony	Year	Category	Work(s)	Result	Ref.
Scribe Awards	2019	Best Audio	The Invention of Death	Nominated	
