= The Celestial Toymaker =

024 – The Celestial Toymaker
- Doctor Who serial
- The Doctor reappears before the Toymaker. He was invisible for two episodes due to William Hartnell's absence, during which the producers considered replacing him.

Cast
- Doctor: William Hartnell – First Doctor
- Companions: Peter Purves – Steven Taylor; Jackie Lane – Dodo Chaplet
- Others: Michael Gough – Toymaker; Campbell Singer – Joey / King of Hearts / Sergeant Rugg; Carmen Silvera – Clara / Queen of Hearts / Mrs. Wiggs; Peter Stephens – Knave of Hearts / Kitchen Boy / Cyril; Reg Lever – Joker; Beryl Braham, Ann Harrison, Delia Linden – Dancers

Production
- Directed by: Bill Sellars
- Written by: Brian Hayles (Note: The scripts were written by Gerry Davis with material by Donald Tosh from an idea by Brian Hayles. Hayles received the writing credit.)
- Script editor: Gerry Davis
- Produced by: Innes Lloyd
- Music by: Dudley Simpson
- Production code: Y
- Series: Season 3
- Running time: 4 episodes, 25 minutes each
- Episode(s) missing: 3 episodes (1–3)
- First broadcast: 2 April 1966
- Last broadcast: 23 April 1966

Chronology
← Preceded by The Ark	Followed by → The Gunfighters

The Celestial Toymaker is the seventh serial of the third season of the British science fiction television programme Doctor Who. Written by Brian Hayles and directed by Bill Sellars, it was broadcast on BBC1 in four weekly parts from 2 to 23 April 1966. In the serial, the First Doctor (William Hartnell) and his travelling companions, Steven Taylor (Peter Purves) and Dodo Chaplet (Jackie Lane), are pitted against a powerful adversary called the Toymaker (Michael Gough), who separates them and forces them to play a series of deadly games, where they risk becoming the Toymaker's playthings.

Hayles had submitted several story ideas to Doctor Who's production team before The Celestial Toymaker was accepted. Script editor Donald Tosh redeveloped the scripts at Hayles's approval to fit within the programme's budget and means; to Tosh's disapproval, after he resigned from the BBC, the scripts were rewritten by his successor, Gerry Davis. The Celestial Toymaker was Innes Lloyd's first credited work as Doctor Who's producer. Hartnell was largely absent from the second and third episodes for a holiday; the production team considered replacing him with a different actor in his absence, but his contract was renewed. Filming took place at Riverside Studios from March to April 1966.

The Celestial Toymaker received an average of 8.3 million viewers across the four episodes, an increase from the preceding serials. Contemporary reviews were mixed, though retrospective reception was generally positive, with praise for the designs, surrealism, and Gough's performance. The serial's film prints and videotapes were wiped in the 1970s, though the fourth episode was recovered in 1984; the first three episodes remain missing. The Celestial Toymaker received print and audiobook adaptations, and was released on VHS and DVD with reconstructions of the missing episodes using off-air recordings; an animated version was also released on DVD and Blu-ray.

== Plot ==
The First Doctor and his travelling companions, Steven Taylor and Dodo Chaplet, arrive in the realm of the Toymaker, an eternal being of infinite power who sets games and traps for the unwary to become his playthings. The Toymaker abducts the Doctor, whom he has faced before, to his study. The Doctor is given the Trilogic Game, a ten-piece puzzle whose pieces must all be moved and remounted in a 1,023-move sequence.

While the Doctor plays the Trilogic Game, Steven and Dodo face different challenges. The first is a game of blind man's buff against two clowns, who are caught cheating and turned into dolls after playing again and losing. Steven and Dodo enter a chamber with seven chairs and a challenge from living playing cards, the King and Queen of Hearts. Steven deduces that six of the chairs are deadly to sit on; Dodo is nearly killed by one that almost freezes her before Steven helps her stand. The King and Queen are trapped when they sit in a chair which folds in on them.

Steven and Dodo meet the comical Sergeant Rugg and Mrs. Wiggs, who challenge them to hunt the thimble—the key to the exit door—which Dodo finds inside Wiggs's large pie. In another room with a dancing floor, Steven and Dodo encounter the three remaining mannequins, who transform into ballerinas and start to dance. Steven and Dodo get trapped as partners with two of the ballerinas and free themselves by swapping their partners for each other. They then find themselves in a vast game of hopscotch against schoolboy Cyril, who slips on a triangle he has booby-trapped and is electrocuted, before reaching the TARDIS.

In the Toymaker's study, the Doctor is at the final stage of the Trilogic Game. He reunites with Steven and Dodo, sending them into the TARDIS while the Toymaker challenges the Doctor to complete the Game. The Doctor realises that, upon making the last move and winning, the Toymaker's domain will disappear along with the TARDIS. Using the Toymaker's voice from inside the TARDIS, he orders the last piece to move, departing while the Toymaker's world is destroyed. The Doctor commemorates their victory with sweets given to Dodo by Cyril, and immediately yells in pain.

== Production ==
=== Conception and writing ===
Freelance writer Brian Hayles submitted several story ideas to Doctor Who's script editors in 1965, including The Dark Planet to Dennis Spooner and four to his successor, Donald Tosh. Producer John Wiles was enthusiastic about Hayles's participation in the series, having worked together on English by Television and Legend of Death. Hayles, a fan of science fiction and eager to work with Wiles again, submitted Doctor Who and the Toymaker, which received positive responses from Tosh and Wiles. Tosh suggested that the titular Toymaker be referred to as the Celestial Toymaker; at one point, he considered making the character an evil, superior member of the Doctor's race. Hayles was commissioned to write the first episode on 29 July; the script was due on 17 September, with options for a further three scripts by 1 October. Around this time, the serial was titled The Trilogic Game.

Hayles delivered the first episode's script on 13 September, and the remaining three were commissioned four days later, due on 26 November; they were delivered on 16 November, 30 November, and 9 December, respectively. Tosh and Wiles sought several changes to the scripts to fit within the programme's means and budget, and to remove some darker elements; however, Hayles was busy with other work, including on the television series United!, and agreed that Tosh could redevelop the scripts. It was proposed that Tosh would be credited for the scripts and Hayles for the original idea. Hayles was commissioned for two more serials—The White Witch and The Hands of Aten—in November 1965, but his submissions were declined in January 1966 as they did not match the vision of the incoming production team.

Tosh's rewrites in late 1965 altered several games and described the Toymaker as "a happy looking occidental Mandarin character". He sent his rewritten scripts of the third and fourth episodes to Hayles in mid-January 1966; he called Hayles's original work "bloody good scripts" and thanked him for agreeing to let Tosh "massacre" them. Wiles and Tosh resigned from the BBC in January, replaced by Innes Lloyd and Gerry Davis, respectively. Lloyd, assigned as producer by Savory and series creator Sydney Newman, trailed Wiles during work on the previous serial, The Ark; The Celestial Toymaker was his first credited work on the programme. Bill Sellars was assigned the serial's director. He was happy with the scripts, though they required some expansion; Tosh was paid for his rewrite on 25 January, and Wiles approved them on 16 February.

Tosh considered including characters named Charles and Marjorie, named after his own uncle and aunt, later renamed George and Margaret, referencing the unseen characters in a 1937 play by Gerald Savory (by now the BBC's head of serials, in charge of Doctor Who); Tosh wanted the characters to finally be seen in The Celestial Toymaker. Shortly before production began, Savory changed his mind and approved for Davis to rewrite the scripts in four days to replace George and Margaret with other characters. Davis had also taken issue with the scripts' "pseudo-smart Noël Coward" dialogue, which he found too "precious" for the audience. Tosh and Wiles disapproved of the rewrites, with the former disliking the "banal" dialogue and the latter feeling the Doctor's storyline had become secondary; he complained to Savory that they did not do justice to the original work. Hayles, however, told Davis he was happy with the final scripts; he received the sole writing credit after Tosh asked to be removed.

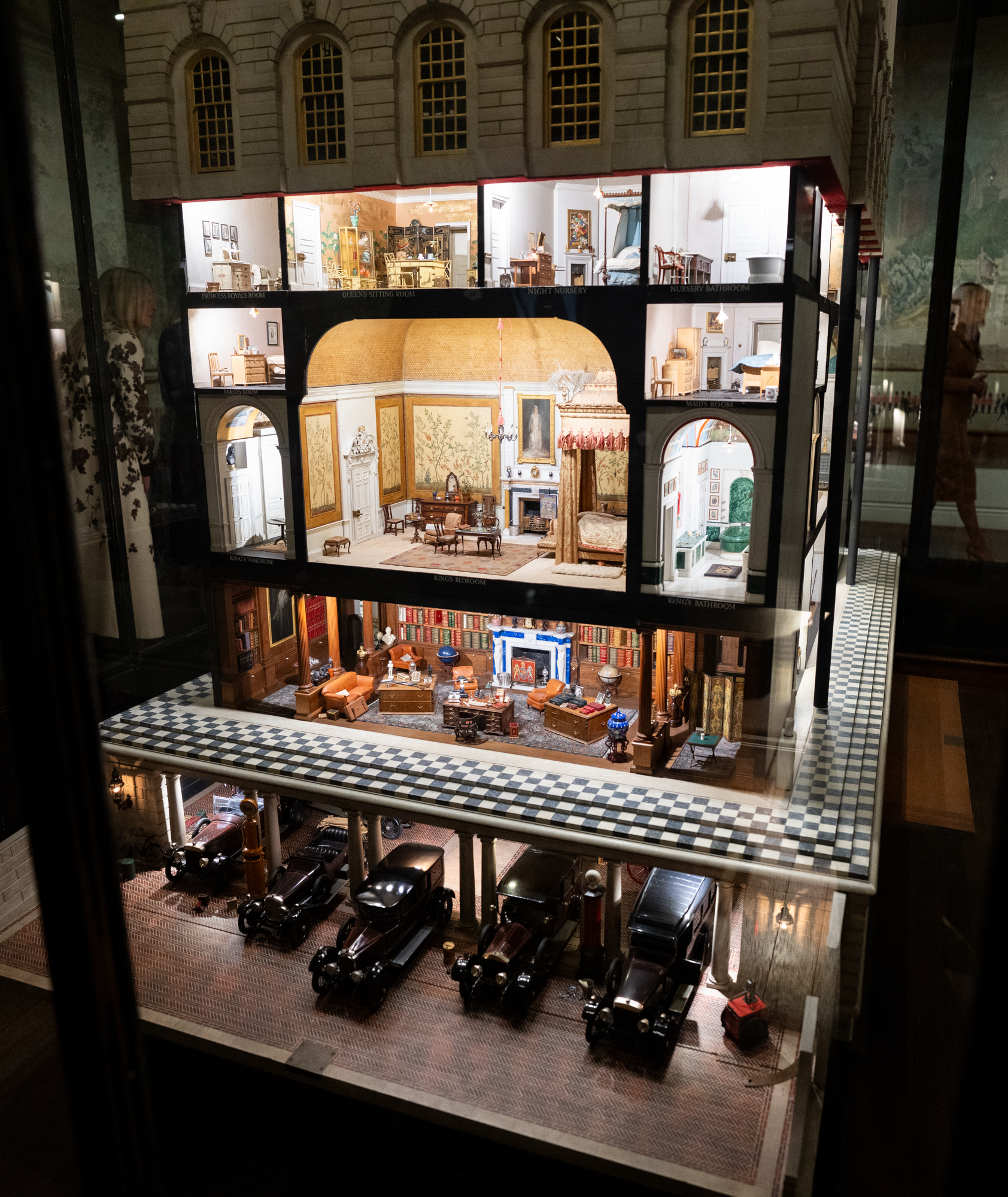
The design of the dollhouse in the Toymaker's office was partly based on Queen Mary's Dolls' House.

Dudley Simpson recorded around 16 minutes of incidental music for the serial in four-hour sessions on 21 and 22 February, using several instruments to evoke different tones. The sound accompanying the moves in the Trilogic Game were made with wood blocks and cymbals. John Wood was the designer; he based the giant robots on a Japanese tin toy owned by his son. The Toymaker's office set included a dollhouse partly based on Queen Mary's Dolls' House; an early idea was to have figures like children moving inside the house, and Wood later regretted making it so large as it no longer resembled a dollhouse. The script described the Toymaker's office as "the modern equivalent of an eighteenth-century gentleman's study-cum-library .... ultra-modern but extremely comfortable". All seven sets fit within the 4,420-square-foot (411 m^{2}) studio. The opening episode was Doctor Who's first to display a flashback to a previous serial, as Steven watches a clip of himself from The Daleks' Master Plan (1965–1966).

=== Casting and characters ===
William Hartnell was largely absent from the second and third episodes as the Doctor is rendered invisible; Hartnell was on holiday during filming. As his contract was due to expire during the serial, the production team considered replacing him with a different actor when he reappeared, (Note: The concept of replacing Hartnell as the Doctor was retrospectively seen as a precursor to regeneration, a process changing the character's appearance as a way to replace the lead actor, which first appeared later in the year in The Tenth Planet.) partly due to Hartnell's fragile health and conflict with the team; however, before this could be enacted, Hartnell's contract was renewed on 15 February 1966. Peter Purves and Jackie Lane enjoyed working on the episode as their characters, Steven and Dodo, were featured extensively and independently. Lane was happy with her outfit, which she had shopped for in Knightsbridge, though Purves felt his pullover made him look fat. Hartnell had a better relationship with Davis and Lloyd than their predecessors, though Purves sought more humour and felt Lloyd, like Wiles, took his work too seriously. Purves acquired the prop of the Trilogic Game after production as it was one of his favourite serials, though he felt it gave him bad luck. (Note: Purves had little work for a year following his departure from Doctor Who. After he discarded the Trilogic Game prop, he was offered a role in Z Cars the following day; shortly afterwards, he was offered to present Blue Peter, which he did for 11 years.)

Lloyd wanted his era on Doctor Who to feature believable characters played by talented actors. Michael Gough was cast as the Toymaker; he had liked some earlier episodes of the programme and enjoyed working on the serial, though he struggled to understand the scripts and found Hartnell occasionally difficult to work with. (Note: Gough's time on Doctor Who partly inspired his then-wife, Anneke Wills, to become involved with the programme; she was cast as Polly, the Doctor's companion, later in the year.) The Toymaker's coat, described in the script as "a splendid-looking bejewelled floor-length coat", was reused from Marco Polo (1964). Campbell Singer and Carmen Silvera were originally cast as George and Margaret; Sellars had previously directed Silvera on Compact, and he later cast Singer in The Newcomers. The actors remained contracted after the characters were replaced, ultimately playing three roles each: Singer as Joey, King of Hearts, and Sergeant Rugg, and Silvera as Clara, Queen of Hearts, and Mrs. Wiggs. Joey's communication via horn instead of voice was inspired by Harpo Marx, while Clara's rising speech pattern was inspired by the all clear air raid siren. Make-up assistant Sylvia James painted Silvera's face as the Queen of Hearts using carmine pigment, which required scouring powder to remove after filming.

Choreography for the third episode's dancing game was provided by Tutte Lemkow, who had previously appeared in Marco Polo as well as The Crusade and The Myth Makers (both 1965); his participation was limited as he was sick with the flu. Several lines of Purves and Lane's dialogue were pre-recorded to allow them to focus on their movements. Beryl Braham, (Note: Braham's great-nephew is Benjamin Cook, who later wrote for Doctor Who Magazine and worked with Doctor Who's showrunner Russell T Davies.) Ann Harrison, and Delia Linden portrayed the ballerina dolls. Braham and Linden recalled that they had no time to warm up before recording; the former was bruised and in tears from the pain and cold. It was Linden's first work in television; she did not recall Lemkow's involvement, only remembering being given simple dancing instructions and told to be "menacing" and "expressionless".

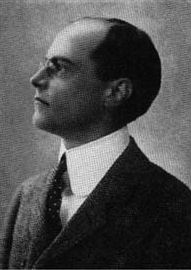
The estate of Frank Richards (pictured) complained about Cyril's imitation of Richards's character Billy Bunter, for which the BBC apologised.

Peter Stephens portrayed the Knave of Hearts, Kitchen Boy, and Cyril. The script described the latter as "a 'Billy Bunter' of a boy", though Davis had suggested the character be more like the Artful Dodger from Charles Dickens's Oliver Twist. Cyril says his nickname is "Billy", though this was not in the script. Literary agent Hope Leresche, on behalf of the estate of Billy Bunter creator Frank Richards, complained about the depiction on 18 April; the BBC clarified that the character was pretending to be like Billy, and a continuity announcement was made before the fourth episode to apologise "for any apparent similarity". Newspaper reports claimed that viewers had complained to the BBC about Cyril, believing that Billy Bunter would not have been so cruel to Steven and Dodo.

=== Filming ===
Early 35 mm filming took place at Ealing Studios on 2 and 3 March 1966. Albert Wand was hired as a double for Hartnell's hand, as the character was invisible; Hartnell recorded several lines of dialogue to be dubbed into the first, second, and fourth episodes. Weekly four-day rehearsals started on 14 March, and recording took place in Studio 1 of Riverside Studios each Friday from 18 March. Two camera images were superimposed to achieve the effect of the Toymaker appearing and vanishing when talking to Steven and Dodo, though some shots simply used specific camera angles instead. Frank Cresswell's studio lighting during blind man's buff in the first episode became progressively darker to indicate the game had become more menacing.

The first three episodes displayed the Toymaker's riddle on screen before the closing credits. The final episode was recorded on 8 April. The destruction of the Toymaker's world was depicted using 38 inches of 35 mm stock footage from the BBC's film library. The Celestial Toymaker had a limited budget due to the expensive production of The Ark: the first two episodes were budgeted at £2,700 and £2,350 but cost more, while the last two were budgeted at £2,475 each but cost less to offset; the fourth, at £1,449, is the cheapest Doctor Who episode ever recorded. The serial cost a total of £9,386 (Note: The four episodes cost £3,686, £2,535, £1,716, and £1,449, respectively.) (equivalent to £153,000 in 2025).

== Reception ==
=== Broadcast and ratings ===
Episode	Title	Run time	Original release date	UK viewers (millions)	Appreciation Index
1	"The Celestial Toyroom"^{†}	24:40	2 April 1966	8.0	48
2	"The Hall of Dolls"^{†}	24:45	9 April 1966	8.0	49
3	"The Dancing Floor"^{†}	24:10	16 April 1966	9.4	44
4	"The Final Test"	23:57	23 April 1966	7.8	43

^† Episode is missing

The Celestial Toymaker was broadcast on BBC1 in four weekly parts from 2 to 23 April 1966. Viewership saw an increase from the two preceding serials, attributed to the later 5:50 p.m. timeslot; the first two episodes received 8 million viewers, increasing to 9.4 million for the third and dropping to 7.4 million for the fourth. Viewed by 15.6% of the UK population. the fourth episode was the beginning of the programme's collapse in ratings, which lasted for five months until Hartnell's departure. Doctor Who was the fifth-most-watched children's programme for April, with an estimated 4.45 million households watching the first, third, and fourth episodes. The Appreciation Index scores were low, dropping to 43 for the fourth episode and continuing a downward that hit its nadir in the next serial. The serial was sold extensively overseas from 1966 to 1973; (Note: Australia's ABC purchased the serial in October 1966 and broadcast it from January 1967 (repeated from March to May 1968), and it was broadcast in Barbados in March 1968, Zambia in June 1968, New Zealand from April 1969, Sierra Leone in February 1971, and Singapore around January 1973. Sierra Leone's copies were returned and destroyed in 1974, and Australia's film prints were destroyed in July 1976.) BBC Enterprises stopped offering it for sale by 1974. The film prints were junked by 1973, and the 405-line videotapes were wiped by 1976. A 16 mm telerecording of the last episode was recovered in the ABC's vaults in Australia in early 1984, returned to the BBC Film and Videotape Library the following month. Only off-air audio recordings made during the original broadcast exist for the first three episodes; no telesnaps were captured.

=== Critical response ===
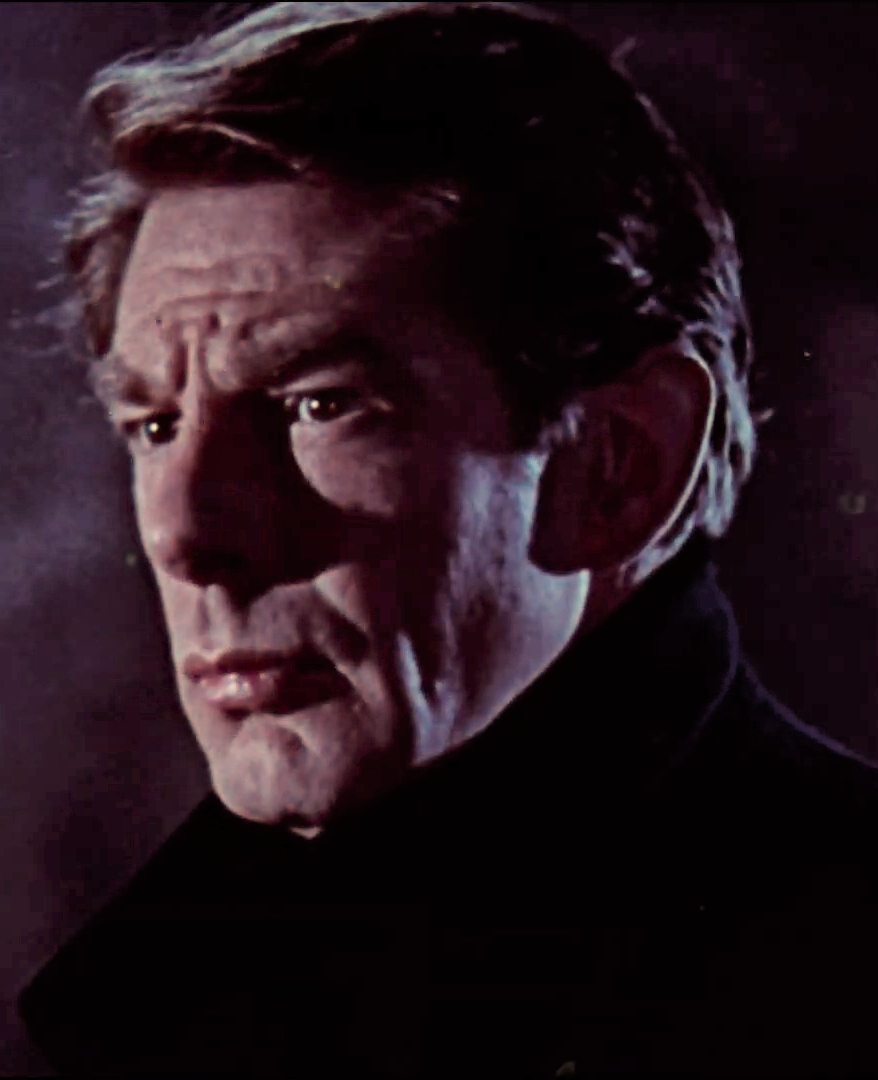
Critics and audiences praised Michael Gough's (pictured in 1958) performance as the Toymaker for his menacing nature.

Leicester Mercury's A.B. criticised the serial's "ugliness and general unwholesomeness", and some viewers were concerned about its terrifying atmosphere. Junior Points of View viewers complained about the Doctor's difficulty with the Trilogic Game as many found it easy. A third of Audience Research Report respondents disliked the fourth episode, criticising the lacklustre game, "ham" acting, and "fantasy gone mad", though many praised the performances (especially Gough), clever scripts, and welcome departure from "the more obvious horrors like Daleks and monsters". The Celestial Toymaker was not received positively upon broadcast; its reputation became positive among fans in subsequent years, though it was reevaluated after its recovery: Doctor Who Magazine readers ranked it the eighth-best First Doctor story in 1998 but it dropped (Note: Of the First Doctor's 29 stories, The Celestial Toymaker was voted 8th in 1998, 17th in 2009, 22nd in 2014, and 23rd in 2023.) to 23rd in 2023.

Several retrospective reviews lauded Gough's performance as the Toymaker; Radio Times's Patrick Mulkern wrote that he "exudes menace", and Doctor Who Magazine's Jamie Lenman felt the role filled "the authority gap left by" Hartnell's absence. David J. Howe and Stephen James Walker considered the character to be the serial's "greatest legacy to the Doctor Who universe". Mark Clapham, Eddie Robson, and Jim Smith lauded Purves's performance in Hartnell's absence, and Mulkern described his work as "capable" and Lane's as "her best outing" on the programme, while Lenman enjoyed the performances of Silvera, Stephens, and Singer. SFX's Ian Berriman felt the serial suffered from Hartnell's absence, particularly in its basic games and uninteresting story.

Paul Cornell, Martin Day, and Keith Topping of The Discontinuity Guide (1995) called the serial "an unqualified success" at exploring surrealism, and Mulkern described it as "a triumph", praising the costumes, designs, and Simpson's score. Fantasy Empire's John Peel lauded the story and villain, calling the serial "a rare treat, a blend of magical qualities", and Peter Haining compared it to a sinister version of a Brothers Grimm tale. Clapham, Robson, and Smith called the story "quietly sinister in its abuse of the iconography of childhood", though felt it had been toned down in rewriting. Valerie Estelle Frankel felt the children's games emphasised Dodo's childlike treatment by the Doctor and Steven. Mark Campbell found the serial "not as interesting as its reputation might suggest", and Starburst's Paul Mount criticised the storyline's "sluggish pace and repetitive nature" and the confusing, uninteresting games. Doctor Who Magazine's Jacqueline Rayner liked the story's concept but found it "terminally dull in execution", and Clayton Hickman thought the games were boring to watch.

== Commercial releases ==
The Celestial Toymaker
- Authors: Gerry Davis; Alison Bingeman
- Cover artist: Graham Potts
- Series: Doctor Who book: Target novelisations
- Release number: 111
- Publisher: Target Books
- Publication date: 19 June 1986
- ISBN: 0-426-20251-1

A novelisation of The Celestial Toymaker was written by Alison Bingeman with input and a foreword by Davis. It was published in hardback by W. H. Allen on 19 June 1986, and in paperback by Target Books on 20 November 1986, with a cover by Graham Potts. Target reissued the paperback with a cover by Alister Pearson on 3 December 1992. Davis's novelisation drew analogies between the Toymaker's games and the behaviours of warmongers, reflecting the nuclear anxiety of the mid-1980s. Fine Arts Casing released a bust of the Toymaker in 1986 and a model figurine in 1987, while Harlequin Miniatures released metal figurines of the First Doctor from the serial in December 1997 and the Toymaker in January 1998.

The off-air recording of the serial was released on CD by BBC Worldwide on 2 April 2001, with linking narration by Purves; it was included, alongside digital copies of the scripts, in The Lost TV Episodes: Collection Two by BBC Audiobooks on 14 February 2011, and released on vinyl by Demon Records on 30 September 2022. The existing fourth episode was included in the VHS Doctor Who: The Hartnell Years, released by BBC Video on 3 June 1991, and the DVD Lost in Time, published by BBC Worldwide on 1 November 2004. The releases obscured or removed the utterance of the racial slur "nigger" during a character's recital of "Eeny, meeny, miny, moe", including by masking with Purves's narration.

=== Animated reconstruction ===
BBC Studios released an animated version of The Celestial Toymaker on DVD and Blu-ray on 10 June 2024. A limited edition SteelBook version was also available. The release includes black-and-white and colour versions, a documentary on the animations, audio commentaries, restoration of the fourth episode, and a 73-minute feature of cast members in an escape room. Australian company Shapeshifter Studio created the 3D animations using motion capture, allowing actors to physically perform movements atop the off-air recordings, as well as facial capture for lip syncing. The first episode was directed by David Devjak, who co-directed the second with Chloe Grech, while Adam Boys directed the third and fourth. Audio engineer Mark Ayres enhanced the original soundtrack and added new sound effects.

Producer Gary Russell found Shapeshifter's involvement appropriate, given Australia's history with Doctor Who. Shapeshifter worked with Big Finish Creative on Doctor Who animations from 2015 and convinced the BBC to experiment with 3D animations with The Web of Fear in 2019; after its mixed response, the company worked to improve its techniques, including moving to a larger motion capture studio with more performers, and the BBC approved its use for The Celestial Toymaker. Shapeshifter worked on the project for around 18 months from August 2022. They rebuilt their pipeline and introduced new software, animating with Unreal Engine and Houdini.

The animators wanted to avoid a hyperrealistic style, instead opting for a painterly look in line with previous 2D Doctor Who animations; the directors sought to pay respects to the original material while trying new approaches to make the world richer, and Russell wanted the animation to be scarier and more "psychedelic". He felt the existing fourth episode exposed the production's cheapness and wanted to take advantage of the new technology. Devjak found the story's location—the first Doctor Who serial outside of the observable universe, where the same rules do not apply—made it the most appropriate for the animation style. The animators used behind-the-scenes photographs as guidelines, particularly for the colours. They pitched several ideas early in production, and were able to maintain most for the final product. Ayres acknowledged the animation style was "experimental" and could "divide opinion" but felt the techniques had been refined and improved since The Web of Fear.

The serial's animated reconstruction allowed for several sequences not possible in the original.

Starburst's Mount noted the animation style was divisive among fans but found it "much more unnerving and convincing than anything the tiny Riverside Studios in London could possibly hope to achieve in 1966"; he praised the fluid animations of Steven, Dodo, and the Toymaker, though felt the Doctor "looks a bit like a caricature" and criticised the escape room feature as "unwatchable". Doctor Who Magazine's Lenman similarly enjoyed the creative liberties, no longer confined to the original sets, though found some of the animations awkward. SFX's Berriman considered the animation an improvement over The Web of Fear and praised the motion-captured character movement but felt the faces looked odd. Purves approved of the animations and found the technique impressive. The animations were screened at BFI Southbank in March 2024 and added to BBC iPlayer in December 2025.

== Sequels ==
The Toymaker has returned in several sequels to The Celestial Toymaker. He was originally set to return in Graham Williams's The Nightmare Fair in season 23 (1986) before it was cancelled; Williams novelised the story in May 1989, and his scripts were adapted as part of Big Finish Productions's The Lost Stories in November 2009, with David Bailie portraying the Toymaker. The character returned in several comic strips for Doctor Who Magazine, including John Peel's The Greatest Gamble in 1981 and Alan Barnes's Endgame in 1996, as well as in Gary Russell's novel Divided Loyalties in October 1999 and Matthew Sweet's audio story The Magic Mousetrap in April 2009.

Bailie reprised the role in John Dorney's audio story Solitaire in June 2010. The character later appeared in George Mann and Cavan Scott's comic story Relative Dimensions in December 2015 and Jacqueline Rayner's short stories "Murder in the Dark" and "Trick or Treat" in September 2017. More than 57 years after the Toymaker's last appearance on television, the character returned as the antagonist in "The Giggle", the third and final of the 60th anniversary specials in 2023, portrayed by Neil Patrick Harris; writer Russell T Davies avoided reference to the character's "Celestial" moniker as it can derogatorily refer to China. The Toymaker was portrayed by Annette Badland—the character's first female representation—in Aurora Fearnley's audio drama Matryoshka in June 2024.

== Bibliography ==
- Brunt, David (10 May 2024). The Doctor Who Production Diary: The Hartnell Years. Telos Publishing. ISBN 978-1-845-83222-3.
- Campbell, Mark (2010). Doctor Who: The Episode Guide. Pocket Essentials. ISBN 978-1-84243-660-8.
- Clapham, Mark; Robson, Eddie; Smith, Jim (2005). Who's Next: An Unofficial Guide to Doctor Who. Virgin Books. ISBN 978-0-753-50948-7.
- Cornell, Paul; Day, Martin; Topping, Keith (1995). The Discontinuity Guide. London: Virgin Books. ISBN 0-426-20442-5.
- Frankel, Valerie Estelle (2018). Women in Doctor Who: Damsels, Feminists and Monsters. Jefferson: McFarland & Company. ISBN 978-1-493-00016-6.
- Haining, Peter (1983). Doctor Who: A Celebration – Two Decades Through Time and Space. W.H. Allen. ISBN 0-491-03351-6.
- Haining, Peter (1984). Doctor Who: The Key to Time – A Year-by-Year Record. W.H. Allen. ISBN 0-491-03283-8.
- Hewett, Richard (23 July 2020). "Who's in Charge?: Changing Character Agency in Early Doctor Who". International Journal of TV Serial Narratives. 6 (1): 5–16. doi:10.6092/issn.2421-454X/9805. ISSN 2421-454X.
- Howe, David J.; Walker, Stephen James (1998). Doctor Who: The Television Companion (2003 ed.). London: BBC Books. ISBN 978-0-563-40588-7.
- Howe, David J.; Walker, Stephen James; Stammers, Mark (2005). Doctor Who: The Handbook. London: Telos Publishing. ISBN 978-1-903-88959-6.
- October, Dene (15 May 2014). "Doctor Who? What's He Talking About? Performativity and the First Doctor". In Barr, Jason; Mustachio, Camille D. G. (eds.). The Language of Doctor Who: From Shakespeare to Alien Tongues. Bloomsbury Publishing. pp. 1–20. ISBN 978-1-442-23481-9.
- October, Dene (2017). "Journeys through Cathay: Remediation and Televisuality in Marco Polo". In Fleiner, Carey; October, Dene (eds.). Doctor Who and History: Critical Essays on Imagining the Past. Jefferson, North Carolina: McFarland & Company. pp. 13–34. ISBN 978-1-476-66656-3.
- Robb, Brian J. (2013). Timeless Adventures: How Doctor Who Conquered TV. Kamera Books. ISBN 978-1-843-44156-4.
- Smith, Paul MC (July 2021). Based on the Popular BBC Television Serial (4th ed.). Wonderful Books. Archived from the original on 19 August 2022.
- Wright, Mark, ed. (13 June 2018). "The Massacre of St Bartholomew's Eve, The Ark, The Celestial Toymaker and The Gunfighters". Doctor Who: The Complete History. 7 (73). London: Panini Comics, Hachette Partworks: 68–105. ISSN 2057-6048.

=== Home media resources ===
- Hadoke, Toby; Purves, Peter (2024). The Celestial Toymaker : "The Celestial Toyroom" (animated reconstruction) (audio commentary). BBC Studios.
- Hadoke, Toby; Purves, Peter; Devjak, David (2024). The Celestial Toymaker : "The Final Test" (animated reconstruction) (audio commentary). BBC Studios.
- Hadoke, Toby; Purves, Peter; Linden, Delia; James, Sylvia (2024). The Celestial Toymaker : "The Dancing Floor" (animated reconstruction) (audio commentary). BBC Studios.
- Hopkins-Smith, Nathanael (producer) (2024). Doctor Who: The Celestial Toymaker – Behind the Scenes (documentary). BBC Studios.
- Production Notes. Doctor Who: The Celestial Toymaker (leaflet). BBC Studios. 2024.
- Wiggins, Martin (compiler) (2024). The Celestial Toymaker (Production Subtitles). 2 Entertain.
