= The Savages (Doctor Who) =

026 – The Savages
- Doctor Who serial
- The Elders' technology is destroyed, bringing an end to their oppression of the savages. Several scholars highlighted the serial's anti-colonialist and pro-democratic themes.

Cast
- Doctor: William Hartnell – First Doctor
- Companions: Peter Purves – Steven Taylor; Jackie Lane – Dodo Chaplet
- Others: Ewen Solon – Chal; Patrick Godfrey – Tor; Peter Thomas – Captain Edal; Geoffrey Frederick – Exorse; Frederick Jaeger – Jano; Robert Sidaway – Avon; Kay Patrick – Flower; Clare Jenkins – Nanina; Norman Henry – Senta; Edward Caddick – Wylda; Andrew Lodge, Christopher Denham, Tony Holland – Assistants; John Dillon – Savage; Tim Goodman – Guard

Production
- Directed by: Christopher Barry
- Written by: Ian Stuart Black
- Script editor: Gerry Davis
- Produced by: Innes Lloyd
- Music by: Raymond Jones
- Production code: AA
- Series: Season 3
- Running time: 4 episodes, 25 minutes each
- Episode(s) missing: All episodes
- First broadcast: 28 May 1966
- Last broadcast: 18 June 1966

Chronology
← Preceded by The Gunfighters	Followed by → The War Machines

The Savages is the ninth serial of the third season of the British science fiction television series Doctor Who. Written by Ian Stuart Black and directed by Christopher Barry, it was broadcast on BBC1 in four weekly parts from 28 May to 18 June 1966. In the serial, the First Doctor (William Hartnell) and his travelling companions, Steven (Peter Purves) and Dodo (Jackie Lane), arrive on a distant planet where they discover the Elders maintain their idyllic society by draining the life source of the primitive savages.

Black approached the programme's production office to pitch a story, having watched the programme with his children for years. He wanted the serial to appeal to the audience's reasoning, rather than resorting to violence and action. Raymond Jones composed the 27-minute score for the serial. The Savages marked the final appearance of Purves as Steven, as the production team found the character inflexible and difficult to write. Filming took place at Riverside Studios from May to June 1966.

The Savages received an average of 4.9 million viewers across the four episodes, the programme's lowest figures since its debut. Reviews were mixed, with praise for the concept, performances, and score. Scholars highlighted the story's anti-colonialist and pro-democratic themes. Its videotapes and film prints were wiped by the BBC in the 1960s and 1970s, and it remains missing; the only extant material includes telesnaps, short film segments, and a complete off-air recording. The story was novelised by Black, and the off-air recording was released as an audiobook. An animated reconstruction was released in March 2025.

== Plot ==
The TARDIS materialises on a distant planet in the far future. The First Doctor and his travelling companions, Steven and Dodo, find the planet inhabited by both an advanced, idyllic civilisation known as the Elders, and bands of roaming savages. The Elders welcome the Doctor, revealing they have admired his exploits from afar and predicted his arrival. Their leader, Jano, showers the Doctor and his companions with compliments and gifts. However, the Doctor becomes suspicious of the Elders' seemingly perfect civilisation, and Dodo finds their secret: they are only able to maintain their energy by draining the life force of the helpless savages. The Doctor, appalled, tries to stop the Elders and persuade them of their immorality.

At Jano's orders, the Doctor is forced into the transfer device and his life force is channelled into Jano, who desires his intelligence. The plan backfires Jano is imbued him with the Doctor's mannerisms, outlook, and morality, causing a personality crisis. Dodo and Steven meanwhile venture outside the city and make contact with the savage leaders, Chal and Tor. The savages are the remnants of a once highly skilled and artistic race, but over the centuries the energy transfer process stymied their creativity and ability. Chal hides the two fugitives in a deep cave system, pursued by a guard, Exorse, whom Steven overpowers. They return to the city to find a weak but determined Doctor, and help him escape the city.

The time travellers help the savages fight back against the Elder guards. The Doctor realises the Elders must be forced, not persuaded, to change their ways. His mixed personality convinces Jano to help the savages; he tries to convince the other Elders to treat the savages as equals, while Exorse also realises the error of his ways. Jano and Exorse begin the destruction of the technology underpinning the society, soon joined by the Doctor, Steven, and Dodo. The technology's destruction means the end of the oppression, and Jano and Chal begin discussing how a new society can be built together. The Doctor surprises Steven by convincing him to remain behind as a mediator. When both sides agree to accept Steven's decision, he decides to stay. The Doctor and a heartbroken Dodo bid their friend goodbye before departing in the TARDIS.

== Production ==
=== Conception and writing ===
While working on the BBC2 series Ransom for a Pretty Girl in late 1965, Ian Stuart Black approached the neighbouring Doctor Who production office, where he asked producer John Wiles and story editor Donald Tosh if he could pitch a story; he had watched the programme with his children since its first serial, and he wanted them to watch something he had written. Wanting to appeal to the audience's reasoning, rather than including violence and action, Black conceived a story in which humans' energies were absorbed to power an artistic civilisation. (Note: Black later commented that the story philosophically paralleled the parasitic nature of the world: "Life lives on life ... from animals and plants, culture to culture".) Tosh and Wiles approved, and Black was contracted for a four-part story in December 1965. He delivered his proposed storyline on 13 January 1966, paid £25 (equivalent to £407 in 2025) per episode. (Note: Black's storyline payment was later deducted from his overall payment when he was formally commissioned.)

The production team encountered difficulties with the preceding serial, The Gunfighters, and considered replacing it with Black's scripts; the difficulties were later resolved, and Black's story kept its original placement. Wiles called Black's synopsis "very exciting". Tosh and Wiles departed the series in January, replaced by Gerry Davis and Innes Lloyd, respectively. Davis commissioned Black to write Doctor Who and the White Savages on 19 January, under the production code AA. The four scripts were due weekly from 21 February, though they were all delivered early: the first on 26 January, and the remaining three on 8, 10, and 23 February. Christopher Barry was assigned as director of the serial, now renamed The Savages; (Note: Black later theorised the title was renamed from The White Savages as it suggested a racial element. Historian Simon Guerrier theorised that the racial element would have been more pronounced under Tosh and Wiles.) Barry, who had previously directed The Daleks (1963–1964) for the programme's first season and the combined The Rescue and The Romans (both 1965) for the second, was invited to return by Lloyd, an old friend. Barry found the script uninteresting and the programme generally stale.

Stuart Walker was assigned the serial's designer—his only work for Doctor Who. For exterior scenes, most of the studio floor was covered in forestry; a wall of honeycomb rock was based on rock formations in south-west France. Daphne Dare and Sonia Markham continued their usual roles in charge of costume and make-up, respectively. Nanina's fur costume was previously used in the film One Million Years B.C. (1966). The actors portraying Elders wore make-up to appear shinier and darker, reflecting their restored "life force". Senta's laboratory was considered the set's centrepiece, with several working props including a cabinet that pumped dry ice and a dark tank filled with bubbling liquid. Raymond Jones, who worked with Barry on The Romans, composed the serial's music; the 27-minute score, including a string quartet and percussion player conducted by Jones, was recorded in early May 1966, and supplemented in the first two episodes by stock music from the Radiophonic Workshop.

=== Casting and characters ===
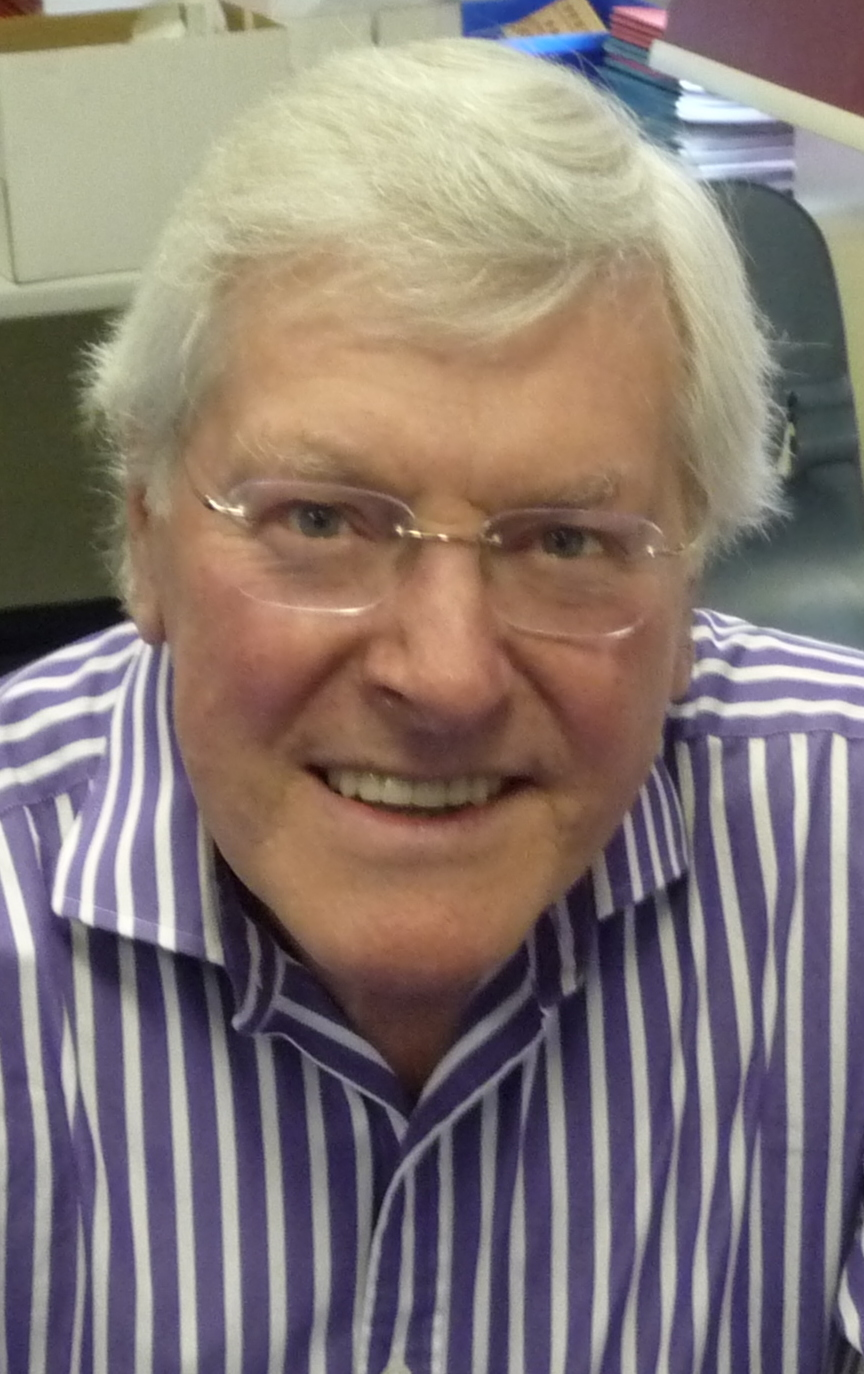
The Savages marked Peter Purves's (pictured in 2010) final appearance as Steven Taylor.

Barry was seen as a competent director, and most actors appreciated his professionalism and patience. He had developed a positive rapport with lead actor William Hartnell following his previous work on the programme, having respected his earlier film career. Black similarly had no problems with Hartnell. According to many, the actor had begun deliberately acting older than his age to ensure his requests were followed. For scenes wherein Jano adopts the Doctor's persona, Hartnell assisted Frederick Jaeger to imitate some of his own mannerisms. The Savages was Peter Purves's last appearance as Steven. Purves and Hartnell were sad to end their working relationship; the former had learned much from their time together, and the latter had failed to bond with Purves's successors, Michael Craze and Anneke Wills, while filming the next serial. Though Davis enjoyed working with Purves, he and Lloyd felt Steven lacked depth and flexibility.

Lloyd told Purves about Steven's departure after filming the second episode of The Ark on 25 February, the day after his contract had been renewed until the end of The Savages. (Note: Purves's contract had been renewed for thirteen episodes, comprising The Celestial Toymaker, The Gunfighters, and The Savages ; however, since these totalled only twelve episodes, he did not have to work the thirteenth week and received an ex gratia payment.) Purves was surprised by the news, feeling a cast change had not been indicated to him beforehand. (Note: Purves compared the sudden news of his departure to those of his two former co-stars—Adrienne Hill (Katarina) in The Daleks' Master Plan (1965–1966) and Maureen O'Brien (Vicki) in The Myth Makers (1966)—who had both been removed from the programme with little notice. He said "no-one felt secure in the show at all" at the time, leading to Hartnell's departure months later.) He had considered departing the role, having missed working with the programme's original producer, Verity Lambert, and feeling Steven had lacked development over recent serials, though he later said he would have remained if given the choice and was upset with the manner in which it occurred. Steven's departure was announced on 26 April, alongside Dodo's in the following serial; Lloyd said the characters were difficult to write due to their fictional backgrounds. Purves pitched a sequel to The Savages in which the Doctor returns to the planet to discover Steven's regime as corrupt as the Elders'.

The Savages is the first Doctor Who serial in which every guest character survives. Barry cast several actors with whom he had worked before: Clare Jenkins as Nanina, having sought a larger role for her after casting her in Moonstrike (1963) and Take a Pair of Private Eyes (1966); Kay Patrick as Flower after working together on The Romans; and Peter Thomas as Edal after casting him in No Cloak – No Dagger (1963). Ewen Solon wore whiskers and latex as Chal to avoid recognition, wanting to break out after starring for several years in Maigret (1960–1963). Many actors returned to Doctor Who later: Jenkins in The Wheel in Space (1968) and The War Games (1969), Robert Sidaway (who portrayed Avon) in The Invasion (1968), Patrick Godfrey (Tor) in The Mind of Evil (1971), Jaeger in Planet of Evil (1975) and The Invisible Enemy (1977), and Solon in Planet of Evil. Tony Holland portrayed an assistant; in 1985, he became known as the co-creator of the television programme EastEnders with Julia Smith, who directed the Doctor Who serial The Smugglers (1966). The casting of two young, attractive guest actresses (including one in a revealing outfit) in The Savages started a trend of Doctor Who stories featuring "something for the dads".

=== Filming ===
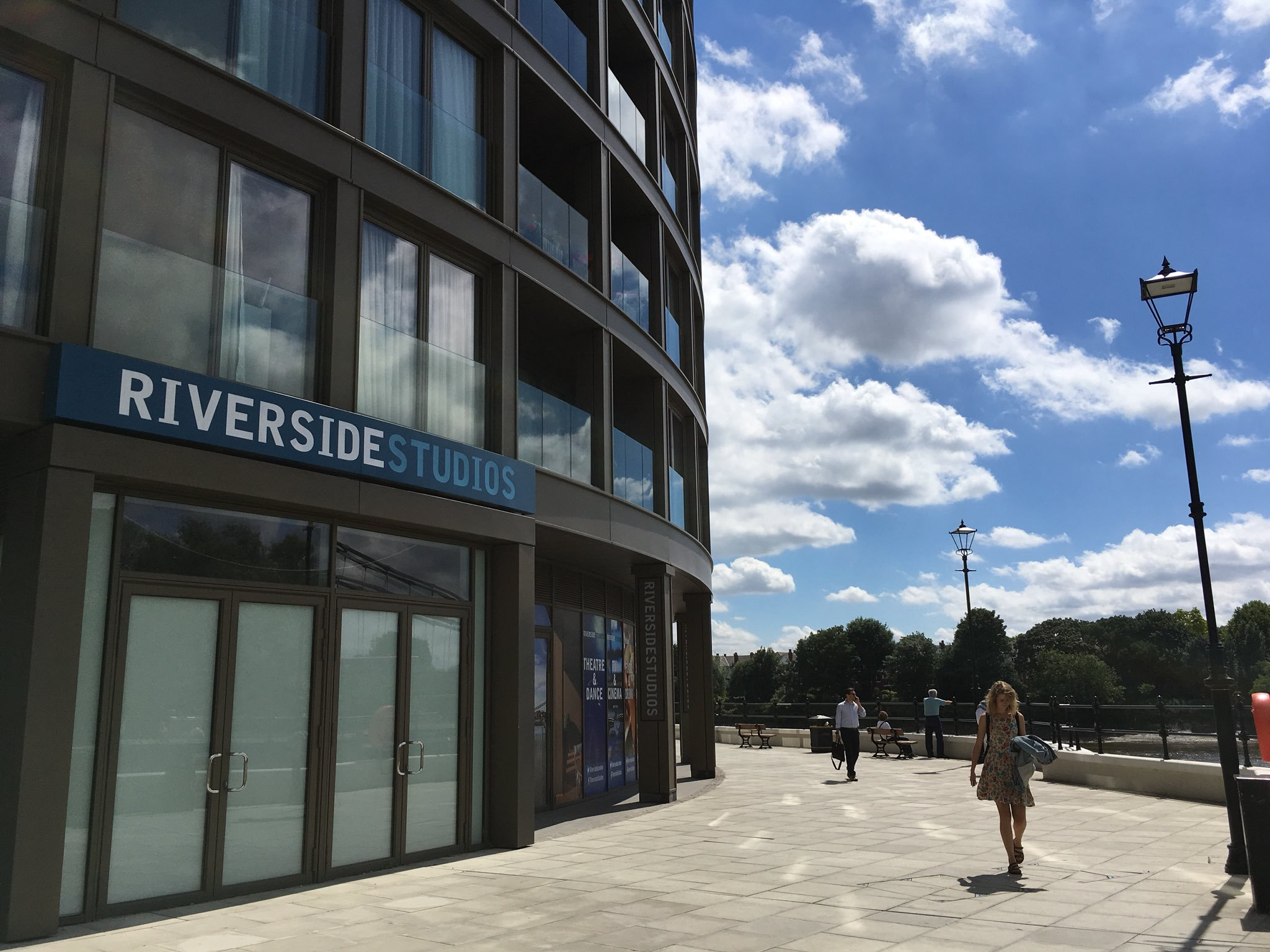
The Savages was recorded at Riverside Studios (pictured in 2018).

Early filming took place at Ealing Studios from 27 to 28 April; Purves and Jackie Lane were released from rehearsals for The Gunfighters. On 29 April, Barry filmed in a desolate gravel pit, which he felt resembled the Moon's surface, in Chalfont St Peter; years later, the pit was later covered by the M25 motorway. Purves and Lane attended filming at Oxshott Quarry near Esher on 1 May. It was Lane's first outdoor filming since her introduction scene in The Massacre (1966), the second time Doctor Who had been filmed in a quarry, and the first time one was used to represent an alien planet on the series—later a staple of Doctor Who and other science-fiction programmes for the BBC. Weekly four-day rehearsals started on 9 May, and recording took place in Studio 1 of Riverside Studios each Friday from 13 May.

Each episode was edited three days after recording, almost two weeks before broadcast. Several extras were utilised in multiple roles in the first episode: in early scenes as citizens and later as laboratory assistants. As the fourth episode's opening immediately followed the climax of the third and featured smoke effects, its first eight scenes were recorded on the same day; an additional 30 minutes were allocated after the third episode's primary recording. The remainder of the final episode was recorded on 3 June, largely centred around the destruction of the laboratory, which could only be recorded once. The first episode was budgeted at £3,205 and the remaining three at £2,575 each; the first two went over budget while the last two went under. The serial cost a total of £11,531 (Note: The four episodes cost £4,542, £2,806, £2,252, and £1,931, respectively.) (equivalent to £188,000 in 2025).

== Reception ==
=== Broadcast and ratings ===
Episode	Title	Run time	Original release date	UK viewers (millions)	Appreciation Index
1	"Episode 1"	23:41	28 May 1966	4.8	48
2	"Episode 2"	23:57	4 June 1966	5.6	49
3	"Episode 3"	24:59	11 June 1966	5.0	48
4	"Episode 4"	24:41	18 June 1966	4.5	48

The Savages was broadcast on BBC1 in four weekly parts from 28 May to 18 June 1966 as the third season's 38th to 41st episodes, brought forwards to the 5:35 p.m. timeslot. The programme partially regained its audience share lost during The Gunfighters, though overall viewership remained low, dropping below The Gunfighters with an average of 4.975 million across all four episodes (the third season's lowest) and a nadir of 4.5 million for the fourth—the lowest figure since the programme's first episode in 1963. The Savages was the first serial of Doctor Who not to have individual episode titles, instead using an overall title divided into numbered parts, which Lloyd felt let viewers know when a new story had started.

The serial was sold overseas from the mid-1960s. (Note: It was broadcast in Australia in March 1967 and April 1968, Barbados in April 1968, New Zealand in May 1969, Zambia in August 1969, Sierra Leone in July 1970, and Singapore in January 1972.) BBC Enterprises stopped offering the serial for broadcast by 1974, and the film prints and negatives were soon destroyed; the 405-line videotapes were wiped in 1967. Approximately 45 seconds of 10 short film fragments from the third and fourth episodes survive, sourced from a private collector and shot on 8 mm film during the Australian screening. Complete off-air audio recordings exist from multiple sources, as well as more than 60 telesnaps captured by John Cura, discovered in the BBC Written Archives Centre by Stephen James Walker and Marcus Hearn in 1993.

=== Critical response ===
An Audience Research Report for the fourth episode indicated that children enjoyed the serial, while some adults praised the excitement and others found it uninteresting; praise was directed towards Solon, Jaeger, and Thomas's performances. It was the third consecutive Report for the programme to receive such mixed responses. The Appreciation Index scores improved from The Celestial Toymaker: 48 for the first, third, and fourth episodes, and 49 for the second. Doctor Who Magazine (DWM) readers consistently ranked The Savages among the lower half of the First Doctor's stories, (Note: Of the First Doctor's 29 stories, The Savages was voted 26th in 1998, 23rd in 2009 and 2014, and 22nd in 2023.) and in the lower quarter of stories overall. (Note: The Savages was voted 137th of 159 total stories in 1998, 162nd of 200 in 2009, and 198th of 241 in 2014.) The serial had a reputation for being forgettable and inconsequential; (Note: In Doctor Who Magazine's reader polls, The Savages received the fewest responses in both 2009 (41%) and 2014 (50%).) Peter Haining felt the inclusion of a monster would have made it more memorable. DWM's Jamie Lenman lauded Hartnell's "bursts of fiery indignation" in the second episode, calling it "amongst his finest performances", and Radio Times's Braxton noted Hartnell's "vehement anti-authoritarianism" made the character so lovable.

Several scholars highlighted the story's anti-colonialist and pro-democratic themes, comparing it to other serials like State of Decay (1980) and The Happiness Patrol (1988); Marcus Harmes, Marc Hudson, and Richard Douglas noted the story could be seen as a response to Rhodesia's Unilateral Declaration of Independence in 1965, comparing the planet's mise-en-scène—the elite, compound-bound society exploiting the outside citizens—to racial segregation in Rhodesia. DWM's Jonathan Morris considered the serial an effective allegory for the real world, noting the titular "savages" truthfully referred to the civilised society, and Vanessa Bishop compared it to eugenics and chemistry, favourably reminded of 1930s and 1940s horror films. Radio Times's Mark Braxton called it "a cogent essay on man's inhumanity to man". John Kenneth Muir compared the writing to Black's other Doctor Who serials: exploring the dangers of artificial intelligence in The War Machines (1966) and exploitation in The Macra Terror (1967); Danny Nicol found the Doctor's behaviour more appropriate in The Savages than The Macra Terror as he encourages reconciliation instead of destruction. Mark Wright compared the Elders to the Doctor's race, the Time Lords—also powerful, technologically advanced, and often corrupt.

Mark Campbell found the "moralistic overtones" obvious but the overall story well-made. Paul Cornell, Martin Day, and Keith Topping of The Discontinuity Guide (1995) enjoyed the story's atmosphere, and DWM's Mark Wright liked Black's writing and the story's general concept, though felt it was "more suited to the world of anthology sci-fi than Saturday teatime adventure". Mark Clapham, Eddie Robson, and Jim Smith called the fourth episode "an intelligent ending to an intelligent story" for the character development and Steven's departure, and Deborah Stanish found Steven's departure heroic, "helping the Doctor complete his mission". David J. Howe and Stephen James Walker similarly considered Steven's exit positive and appropriate, though found the mixed execution of the interesting story premise indicative of the programme's "need of a fresh approach". Several reviewers lauded Jones's score; DWM's Bishop was surprised to discover it was an original composition for the programme. Marcus Hearn considered the second episode's cliffhanger among the programme's best.

== Commercial releases ==
The Savages
- Author: Ian Stuart Black
- Cover artist: David McAllister
- Series: Doctor Who book: Target novelisations
- Release number: 109
- Publisher: Target Books
- Publication date: 20 March 1986
- ISBN: 0-491-03602-7

A novelisation of The Savages was written by Black based on his original scripts, preferring not to let other writers adapt them. It was published in hardback by W. H. Allen on 20 March 1986, and by Target Books in paperback on 11 September 1986, with a cover design by David McAllister. Target republished the book on 19 November 1992, with a cover by Alister Pearson. An audiobook of the novelisation, read by Purves, was published by BBC Audiobooks on 4 February 2021.

The serial's audio was released on CD by the BBC Radio Collection on 4 November 2002, with narration by Purves; it was included in The Lost TV Episodes: Collection 2 by BBC Audiobooks in February 2011. A sound effect from the serial was included on Doctor Who at the BBC Radiophonic Workshop Volume 1: The Early Years 1963–1969, released on CD by BBC Music in May 2000, while Jones's incidental score was featured on the eleven-disc version of Doctor Who: The 50th Anniversary Collection, released by Silva Screen in September 2014. The surviving film segments were included on Lost in Time, released on DVD by BBC DVD in November 2004.

=== Animated reconstruction ===
BBC Studios commissioned an animated reconstruction of The Savages in September 2023. It was directed by AnneMarie Walsh and executive produced by Paul Hembury, with character designs by Martin Geraghty and sound work by Mark Ayres. Walsh wanted to effectively highlight the differences between the two societies in the story, designing the city to resemble a parasite; deciding the world's look and feel was one of the biggest challenges for the animation team. Hembury felt the existing reference photographs allowed the animators to remain faithful to the original material.

Walsh sought to honour the original episodes by following Barry's camera scripts, while taking some creative liberties granted by the medium such as different camera movements; the reconstruction featured fewer shots than modern animations as she tried to closely match the original serial. Walsh and Geraghty made the animation more restrained than their 2023 work on The Underwater Menace (1967), with sterile buildings and dusty exteriors. While the savages are barefoot in the original serial, the animators added shoes to avoid drawing toes. Animation work was completed in January 2025.

The reconstruction was announced in December 2024, and released on DVD and Blu-ray on 24 March 2025. A limited edition SteelBook version was also available for Blu-ray. The release includes black-and-white and colour versions, reconstructions from original photographic material, audio commentaries, Charles Norton's 90-minute documentary about Lloyd, Stuart Denman's 99-minute documentary on The Savages, and a 27-minute internal training film for BBC producers. DWM's Lenman favourably compared the animation style to Star Trek: The Animated Series and the work of Hanna-Barbera and called the release "a stunning collection which simply begs to be seen"; Starburst's Paul Mount similarly felt the documentaries made the release "a pretty essential immediate purchase". The animated episodes were screened at BFI Southbank on 28 February—the first time the serial had been screened in the United Kingdom since 1966—followed by discussions with Purves, Walsh, Hembury, and other animators, and they were added to BBC iPlayer on 3 October 2026.

== Bibliography ==
=== Book and journal sources ===
- Bould, Mark (2011). "Doctor Who: Adaptations and Flows". In Telotte, J. P.; Duchovnay, Gerald (eds.). Science Fiction Film, Television, and Adaptation: Across the Screens. Routledge. pp. 143–163. ISBN 978-1-136-65009-3.
- Brunt, David (10 May 2024). The Doctor Who Production Diary: The Hartnell Years. Telos Publishing. ISBN 978-1-845-83222-3.
- Campbell, Mark (2010). Doctor Who: The Episode Guide. Pocket Essentials. ISBN 978-1-84243-660-8.
- Clapham, Mark; Robson, Eddie; Smith, Jim (2005). Who's Next: An Unofficial Guide to Doctor Who. Virgin Books. ISBN 978-0-753-50948-7.
- Cornell, Paul; Day, Martin; Topping, Keith (1995). The Discontinuity Guide. London: Virgin Books. ISBN 0-426-20442-5.
- Decker, Kevin S. (2013). Who is Who?: The Philosophy of Doctor Who. I.B. Tauris. ISBN 978-1-780-76553-2.
- Haining, Peter (1983). Doctor Who: A Celebration – Two Decades Through Time and Space. W.H. Allen. ISBN 0-491-03351-6.
- Harmes, Marcus; Hudson, Marc; Douglas, Richard (2024). "Doctor Who and the seeds of anxiety: exploring popular narratives of energy justice and exploitation". Energy Research & Social Science (107) 103347. Elsevier. doi:10.1016/j.erss.2023.103347. ISSN 2214-6296. LCCN 2014205258. OCLC 889252485.
- Howe, David J.; Walker, Stephen James (2013). Doctor Who: The Television Companion. Vol. 1 (2021 ed.). London: Telos Publishing. ISBN 978-1-845-83156-1.
- Howe, David J.; Walker, Stephen James; Stammers, Mark (2005). Doctor Who: The Handbook. Vol. 1 (2016 ed.). London: Telos Publishing. ISBN 978-1-845-83941-3.
- Muir, John Kenneth (1999). A Critical History of Doctor Who on Television. Jefferson, North Carolina: McFarland & Company. ISBN 978-0-786-40442-1.
- Newman, Kim (2005). Doctor Who. British Film Institute. ISBN 1-84457-090-8.
- Nicol, Danny (2 February 2018). Doctor Who: A British Alien?. Palgrave Macmillan Cham. doi:10.1007/978-3-319-65834-6. ISBN 978-3-319-65834-6.
- Orthia, Lindy A. (3 June 2010). "'Sociopathetic Abscess' or 'Yawning Chasm'? The Absent Postcolonial Transition in Doctor Who". The Journal of Commonwealth Literature. 45 (2). SAGE Publications: 207–225. doi:10.1177/0021989410366891. hdl:10440/1261. ISSN 0021-9894. LCCN 65009987. OCLC 47091524.
- Purves, Peter (2009). Here's One I Wrote Earlier. Green Umbrella Publishing. ISBN 978-1-906-63534-3.
- Robb, Brian J. (2013). Timeless Adventures: How Doctor Who Conquered TV. Kamera Books. ISBN 978-1-843-44156-4.
- Smith, Paul MC (July 2021). Based on the Popular BBC Television Serial (4th ed.). Wonderful Books. Archived from the original on 19 August 2022.
- Stanish, Deborah (13 November 2012). "Anything Goes". In Stanish, Deborah; Myles, L.M. (eds.). Chicks Unravel Time: Women Journey Through Every Season of Doctor Who. Mad Norwegian Press. pp. 224–230. ISBN 978-1-935-23412-8.
- Tateishi, Ramie (2017). "History as Genre, Aesthetic and Context in The Gunfighters". In Fleiner, Carey; October, Dene (eds.). Doctor Who and History: Critical Essays on Imagining the Past. Jefferson, North Carolina: McFarland & Company. pp. 78–91. ISBN 978-1-476-66656-3.
- Wright, Mark, ed. (7 September 2016). "The Savages, The War Machines, The Smugglers and The Tenth Planet". Doctor Who: The Complete History. 8 (27). London: Panini Comics, Hachette Partworks. ISSN 2057-6048.

=== Magazine sources ===
- Barnes, Alan (December 2016). Spilsbury, Tom (ed.). "The Fact of Fiction: The Savages". Doctor Who Magazine. No. 505. Panini Magazines. pp. 58–68. ISSN 0957-9818.
- Hearn, Marcus (April 2025). Quinn, Jason (ed.). "Tour de Force". Doctor Who Magazine. No. 615. Panini Magazines. pp. 38–41. ISSN 0957-9818.
- Morris, Jonathan (February 2025). Quinn, Jason (ed.). "Missing in Action: The Savages". Doctor Who Magazine. No. 613. Panini Comics. pp. 24–25. ISSN 0957-9818.
- Pixley, Andrew (20 September 2000). Barnes, Alan (ed.). "The DWM Archive: The Savages". Doctor Who Magazine. No. 295. Panini Comics. pp. 18–24. ISSN 0957-9818.
- Richardson, David (May 1995). Vincent-Rudzki, Jan (ed.). "Ian Stuart Black Part 1: Philosophical Who". TV Zone. No. 66. Visual Imagination. pp. 42–45. ISSN 0957-3844.

=== Home media sources ===
- Denman, Stuart (director); Hadoke, Toby (presenter) (2025). Remembering/Forgetting The Savages (documentary). BBC Studios.
- Hadoke, Toby; Patrick, Kay; Sidaway, Robert (6 April 2024). The Savages: "Episode 1" and "Episode 2" (audio commentary). BBC Studios.
- Hadoke, Toby; Purves, Peter; Aston, Julian (20 February 2024). The Savages: "Episode 3" and "Episode 4" (audio commentary). BBC Studios.
- Norton, Charles (2025). Production Notes. Doctor Who: The Savages (leaflet). BBC Studios. LEAFLET183BK.
