= Bunker Soldiers =

2001 novel by Martin Day

- Author: Martin Day
- Series: Doctor Who book: Past Doctor Adventures
- Release number: 39
- Subject: Featuring: First Doctor; Steven and Dodo
- Set in: Period between The Gunfighters and The Savages
- Publisher: BBC Books
- Publication date: February 2001
- Pages: 282
- ISBN: 0-563-53819-8
- Preceded by: The Quantum Archangel
- Followed by: Rags

Bunker Soldiers is a BBC Books original novel written by Martin Day and based on the long-running British science fiction television series Doctor Who. It features the First Doctor, Steven and Dodo.

== Synopsis ==
The first Doctor and his companions are trapped in Kyiv in the year 1240 as a murderous army sweeps in ever closer. To complicate matters, something alien is awakening beneath the innocent defenders.
