= Raymond Jones (composer) =

British composer

- Occupation: Composer
- Television: Doctor Who

Raymond Jones is a television composer who is best known for his work on Doctor Who.

Jones's work on Doctor Who was during William Hartnell's era as the First Doctor in The Romans (1965) and The Savages (1966), but he also composed for three episodes of BBC television's Wodehouse Playhouse in 1975.
