= The Quantum Archangel =

2001 novel by Craig Hinton

- Author: Craig Hinton
- Series: Doctor Who book: Past Doctor Adventures
- Release number: 38
- Subject: Featuring: Sixth Doctor; Mel
- Set in: Period between The Trial of a Time Lord and Time and the Rani a sequel to The Time Monster
- Publisher: BBC Books
- Publication date: January 2001
- Pages: 284
- ISBN: 0-563-53824-4
- Preceded by: The King of Terror
- Followed by: Bunker Soldiers

The Quantum Archangel is a BBC Books original novel written by Craig Hinton and based on the long-running British science fiction television series Doctor Who. It features the Sixth Doctor and Mel, the Master, and an appearance by an alternate version of the Third Doctor.

== Synopsis ==
The Doctor and Mel must work through personal problems in order to defeat Kronos, a powerful being seeking revenge on the Master.

== Continuity ==
- The story is a sequel to the 1972 television serial The Time Monster.
- The Master and the Doctor are the only Time Lords who have survived a time ram.
- Previous to this book, the Doctor and Mel have fought the Daleks, the Nestenes, rogue Bandrils from Timelash, and the Quarks from The Dominators.
