= Martin Day (writer) =

British writer

- Born: 1968 (age 56–57)

Martin Day (born 1968 in Yeovil) is a screenwriter and novelist best known for his work on various spin-offs related to the BBC Television series Doctor Who, and many episodes of the soaps Fair City, Doctors and Family Affairs. Having worked previously at Bath Spa University and as a Royal Literary Fund Fellow at the University of Bristol, he is now Lecturer in Scriptwriting & Screenwriting at the University of Winchester.

== Work ==
Day's first published fiction was the novel The Menagerie in 1995, published by Virgin Publishing as part of their Doctor Who Missing Adventures series. Following the withdrawal of Virgin's licence to produce Doctor Who novels, Day moved to BBC Books, who published the novel The Devil Goblins from Neptune in 1997. The novel (co-written with Keith Topping) was the first of BBC Books' Past Doctor Adventures series, and was quickly followed by The Hollow Men in 1998 - again written with Topping. 1998 also saw the publication of Another Girl, Another Planet by Virgin Publishing. Co-written with Steve Bowkett (under the pseudonym Len Beech), this was one of the first books in Virgin's line of Bernice Summerfield novels.

Following these novels, Day returned to solo writing, and to the Past Doctor Adventures range in 2001 with the novel Bunker Soldiers. This was followed in 2004 by the novel The Sleep of Reason, one of the final Eighth Doctor Adventures to be published and perhaps his most popular novel. Between 2000 and 2001 Day wrote nine episodes for Five's Family Affairs, and in 2005 he started writing for BBC One's Doctors. In 2008 he was lead writer on Crisis Control, a new series for CBBC; Day storylined all thirteen episodes. In 2015 he started writing for RTÉ One's soap Fair City.

As well as writing fiction, Day has also written several unofficial guide books to television series such as The X Files, Star Trek: The Next Generation and The Avengers. These were published by Virgin, and co-written with Keith Topping and (with the exception of Shut It!, a guide to The Sweeney and The Professionals) Paul Cornell. Cornell, Day and Topping also wrote Doctor Who Discontinuity Guide, published by Virgin in 1995 as a light-hearted guide to the mistakes and incongruities of the television series. The first book written by Cornell, Day and Topping was Classic British TV, which was released by Guinness Publishing in 1993 and 1996.

In recent years Day has continued his work on Doctor Who, with the play No Man's Land for Big Finish Productions' audio adventures range, the bestselling novel Wooden Heart for the BBC's range of New Series Adventures, and comic strips for Doctor Who Adventures. The Jade Pyramid, an original Doctor Who audiobook for the eleventh Doctor, and a novelisation of an episode of Merlin, were both released in 2010. Subsequent audiobooks included Children of Steel for The Sarah Jane Adventures, The Sleeping Blood and The Phantom Piper for The Companion Chronicles, and The World, the Flesh and the Devil for Irwin Allen's The Time Tunnel.
