= Dodo Chaplet =

Fictional character in the TV series Doctor Who

Dodo
- Doctor Who character
- Jackie Lane as Dorothea "Dodo" Chaplet
- First appearance: The Massacre of St Bartholomew's Eve (1966)
- Last appearance: The War Machines (1966)
- Portrayed by: Jackie Lane
- Voiced by: Lauren Cornelius
- Duration: 1966

In-universe information
- Full name: Dorothea Chaplet
- Nickname: Dodo
- Species: Human
- Gender: Female
- Affiliation: First Doctor
- Home: Earth
- Nationality: British (English)

Dorothea "Dodo" Chaplet is a fictional character played by Jackie Lane in the long-running British science fiction television series Doctor Who. An Earth teenager from the year 1966, she was a companion of the First Doctor. Dodo was depicted as child-like, friendly, and upbeat, serving in a surrogate granddaughter role for the Doctor during her time in the series. Dodo travelled with the Doctor for four serials, departing in the serial The War Machines. Dodo has appeared in several spin-off productions, including Big Finish audio dramas and novels.

The character of Anne Chaplet was originally meant to take on Dodo's companion role, but following the failure of a previous companion from a time in Earth's past, Dodo was created to fulfill Anne's role. Series producer Innes Lloyd did not have room for Dodo's character in the series, and as a result scrapped the character early on into her tenure.

Following her appearance in the series, Lane found herself typecast in Dodo-like roles, resulting in her leaving acting and moving onto other jobs. Lane largely distanced herself from the series, very rarely becoming involved with conventions and interviews.

== Appearances ==
=== Television ===
Dodo is introduced at the end of the serial The Massacre of St Bartholomew's Eve. In that story, the Doctor and Steven travel to 1572 Paris, using the Doctor's time machine, the TARDIS. There, the Doctor and Steven witness the St. Bartholomew's Day massacre. Despite befriending a young woman named Anne Chaplet, the Doctor knows he cannot prevent the coming massacre and leaves Anne behind. The TARDIS lands in 1960s London, where Dodo wanders into it, thinking it was a real police box. The Doctor hypothesizes that Dodo may be Anne's descendent, and Dodo leaves with the Doctor and Steven.

Dodo is an orphan, and has no family in her home time. Dodo is depicted as being friendly, upbeat and hopeful in her characterization throughout the series. Dodo reminded the Doctor of his granddaughter, Susan Foreman. She is additionally depicted as naive and child-like.

In the following serial, The Ark, Dodo inadvertently brings her common cold to a future generation ship, which infects the humans on board. This allows the alien Monoids to come to power. The Doctor, Dodo, and Steven are able to thwart the Monoids. Following this, she travels with the Doctor and Steven in the serials The Celestial Toymaker, The Gunfighters, and The Savages. She makes her final appearance in The War Machines, where the villainous WOTAN hypnotizes her. She is taken to the country to recover but does not reappear after this. Ben and Polly reveal to the Doctor that she elected to stay in the 20th century.

Dodo subsequently appeared in spin-off media. She appears in the novels Salvation and The Man in the Velvet Mask, set during her travels with the Doctor and Steven. Salvation reveals that Dodo is actually a nickname given to her by bullies, and that her real name is Dorothea. Dodo also appears in the Past Doctor Adventures novel Bunker Soldiers, four short stories in the Virgin Decalog and BBC Short Trips, and several Big Finish Productions audio dramas. She also appears in the book Who Killed Kennedy, which depicts Dodo following the events of The War Machines, revealing she suffered a nervous breakdown following the serial, and was drifting in and out of psychiatric institutions. Dodo begins a relationship with the book's protagonist, James Stevens, but is subsequently killed. A republishing of the novel later depicts Stevens requesting the Doctor's help to travel back in time and save her life.

== Conception and casting ==
Dodo was portrayed by actress Jackie Lane. According to several sources, Lane had previously been considered for the part of Susan. Lane was frequently cast in the role of child-like characters due to her youthful appearance and short height. Dodo was the first of many companions to be considered "trendy", in part due to her fashion. According to Lane, she got on well with her co-stars William Hartnell and Peter Purves, and especially well with Hartnell, who was typically considered to be irate.

Lane was originally planned to depict Anne Chaplet, but this was changed to Dodo following the failure of a previous companion who hailed from the past, Katarina. Dodo fulfilled Susan's earlier role in the series, acting as a surrogate granddaughter for the Doctor. Dodo was originally intended to have a "common" accent, and she is portrayed this way at the end of The Massacre. However, starting with the next story, The Ark, it was declared that Doctor Who regulars were required to speak in "BBC English", and so Dodo's accent was changed. In a 1988 interview with Doctor Who Magazine, she stated that Innes Lloyd, then the series' producer, had plans for the series that did not involve Dodo or Steven, resulting in Dodo being written out of the series with an anticlimactic ending for the character. Writer Gerry Davis stated that the character was dropped in favor of Polly because "the camera picked up that [Dodo] was an older woman and we thought the audience would identity better with this leggy swinging Sixtiees girl."

Dodo's appearance in The Man in the Velvet Mask was chosen because author David O'Mahoney wanted to have a single companion alongside the Doctor, and felt Dodo's obscurity gave him more room to explore her character. The novel provided a large amount of characterization for the character. Many Doctor Who novel authors went for obscure characters like Dodo for stories at the time for similar reasons, as it allowed authors to push limits with the characters not possible with more popular characters.

Following her time on the show, Lane found herself in many more roles but was annoyed at being frequently typecast in roles similar to Dodo. She thus quit acting as a result and took on many different jobs, including a voiceover agency. Lloyd would later request help finding work from Lane's agency, with Lane declining as "revenge" for being removed from the role of Dodo. Lane was reluctant to attend interviews or conventions. She recounted one interview in 1992, during which she realized how much of an impact her role as Dodo had made. She rarely returned to the franchise, though she filmed a greeting in celebration of Doctor Who's 50th Anniversary.

== Reception ==
The book Doctor Who: A History stated that Dodo's introduction helped bring a "sense of fun" to the show after a darker atmosphere in the months prior, with The Times concurring, stating that Dodo brought "youth and energy to the show". Dodo has been described as a fan favorite, in part due to her role in the early days of the franchise. The book Who Travels with the Doctor?: Essays on the Companions of Doctor Who described Dodo as being a highly abused and obscure character in the series, as she frequently suffered from misfortunes and her short time in the series.
