= First Doctor =

Fictional British TV character

The Doctor
The First Doctor
- Doctor Who character
- William Hartnell as the First Doctor
- First regular appearance: An Unearthly Child (1963)
- Last regular appearance: The Tenth Planet (1966)
- Introduced by: Verity Lambert
- Portrayed by: William Hartnell (1963–1966, 1972–1973); Richard Hurndall (1983); David Bradley (2017, 2022)
- Succeeded by: Patrick Troughton (Second Doctor)

Information
- Tenure: 23 November 1963 – 29 October 1966
- No of series: 4
- Appearances: 29 stories (134 episodes)
- Companions: Susan Foreman; Ian Chesterton; Barbara Wright; Vicki; Steven Taylor; Katarina; Sara Kingdom; Dodo Chaplet; Ben Jackson Polly
- Chronology: Season 1 (1963–1964); Season 2 (1964–1965); Season 3 (1965–1966); Season 4 (1966); Season 10 (1972–1973); Season 20 (1983); Series 10 (2017); Specials (2022)

The First Doctor is the original incarnation of the Doctor, the protagonist of the British science fiction television series Doctor Who. He was portrayed by actor William Hartnell in the first three series from 1963 to 1966 and the tenth anniversary story The Three Doctors from 1972 to 1973. The character occasionally appeared in the series after Hartnell's death, played by Richard Hurndall in the 1983 special "The Five Doctors" and by David Bradley in 2017 and 2022. To date, the First Doctor is the sole incarnation of the Doctor to have been recast for later televised appearances.

Within the series' narrative, the Doctor is a centuries-old alien Time Lord from the planet Gallifrey who travels in time and space in the TARDIS, frequently with companions. At the end of life, the Doctor regenerates; as a result, the physical appearance and personality of the Doctor changes. The concept of regeneration, initially referred to as a "renewal", was introduced when Hartnell left the series due to his increasingly bad health, consequently extending the series' life into the following century, with Hartnell being succeeded by the Second Doctor (Patrick Troughton).

Hartnell's portrayal of the character was initially a stubborn and abrasive old man who was distrustful of humans, but ultimately mellowed out into a more compassionate, grandfatherly figure who adored his travels with his companions. The First Doctor's original companions were his granddaughter Susan Foreman (Carole Ann Ford) and her schoolteachers Ian Chesterton (William Russell) and Barbara Wright (Jacqueline Hill). In later episodes, he travelled alongside 25th-century orphan Vicki (Maureen O'Brien), space pilot Steven Taylor (Peter Purves), Trojan handmaiden Katarina (Adrienne Hill), Space Security Agent Sara Kingdom (Jean Marsh), and sixties flower child Dodo Chaplet (Jackie Lane). His final on-screen companions were the working class sailor Ben Jackson (Michael Craze) and the sophisticated socialite Polly (Anneke Wills). Of the 134 episodes Hartnell appeared in as a regular, 42 are missing.

== Character biography ==
The First Doctor is a character shrouded in mystery; little is known about him at the outset except that he has a granddaughter, Susan Foreman, and that they come from their own planet. He has a ship that travels through time and space, the TARDIS, which is currently disguised as a police box (Susan notes that it used to be able to change to blend in with its surroundings), and is bigger on the inside. The Doctor describes himself and Susan as "exiles" without specifying why or even whether their exile is self-imposed. It would not be until the last adventure of the Doctor's second incarnation that the name of the Doctor's people (the Time Lords) would be revealed, and the third incarnation before the name of his home planet (Gallifrey) was first spoken.

The series' first episode opens with a pair of schoolteachers in contemporary (1963) London, Ian Chesterton and Barbara Wright, investigating the mystery of Susan, a student who seems confused and even frustrated at how what she is learning in history and especially mathematics seems to be wrong. Following Susan to her supposed home, they discover the TARDIS in a junkyard, surprising both Susan and her grandfather the Doctor, who launches the ship in response to the discovery. Ian and Barbara are involuntarily taken on a journey back to the year 100,000 BC and spend two years adventuring through time and space with the Doctor, who at this point in the series has no control over the navigation systems of the TARDIS.

It was as this incarnation that the Doctor first met the Daleks and the Cybermen, races that would become his most implacable foes. The TARDIS crew also observed many historical events such as the Reign of Terror in revolutionary France, meeting Marco Polo in China and Aztecs in Mexico. When Susan fell in love with the human resistance fighter David Campbell, the Doctor left her behind to allow her to build a life for herself on 22nd century Earth (The Dalek Invasion of Earth), although he promised to return some day. The Doctor, Ian and Barbara were then joined by Vicki, whom they saved in The Rescue from the planet Dido.

At the conclusion of a chase through time by Daleks, Ian and Barbara used the Dalek time machine to go home (The Chase), and their place in the TARDIS was taken by a future space pilot named Steven Taylor, who had been captured by the robot Mechanoids but escaped due to the Dalek attack. The Doctor met another member of his own race for the first time in the form of the Meddling Monk and had an adventure in Galaxy 4. During the siege of Troy, Vicki decided to leave the TARDIS to stay with Troilus, adopting the name Cressida. The Doctor and Steven were next briefly joined by Trojan slave Katarina and a security agent from 4000 AD Sara Kingdom, but both were killed during the events of The Daleks' Master Plan, where the Daleks plotted to invade Earth's Solar System in 4000 AD, before being destroyed when the Doctor activated their weapon the Time Destructor. Due to this he was aged significantly; the effects on Sara were enough to reduce her to dust.

After narrowly missing the Massacre of St Bartholomew's Eve, the Doctor and Steven took on board a young girl named Dodo Chaplet. Dodo brought a cold virus to the far future, which nearly annihilated the humans and Monoids travelling on The Ark. It was cured and when the TARDIS arrived on the Ark 700 years later the TARDIS crew helped the humans reach their destination, the Monoids having taken over the Ark. One of the First Doctor's most deadly foes was the Celestial Toymaker, who forced him and his companions to play deadly games and briefly made the Doctor invisible and mute. Eventually, the Doctor managed to win the Trilogic Game allowing them all to escape the Toymaker's domain.

Eventually, Steven and Dodo left the Doctor as well, Steven remaining on an alien planet as a mediator between two races (The Savages), and Dodo deciding to remain on Earth in 1966 to recover from being hypnotised by the supercomputer WOTAN. The Doctor was then joined by upper-class secretary Polly and sailor Ben Jackson (The War Machines).

The toll of years put strain on the Doctor's elderly frame. After defeating the Cybermen at the Antarctic Snowcap Station (The Tenth Planet), the Doctor was fearfully reluctant to regenerate when he crossed paths with one of his future incarnations ("Twice Upon a Time"), who is similarly reluctant to regenerate. The events they experience convince both Doctors to go through with their regenerations. After returning to his TARDIS and helping Polly and Ben back inside, the Doctor falls unconscious and regenerates into the Second Doctor.

== Personality ==
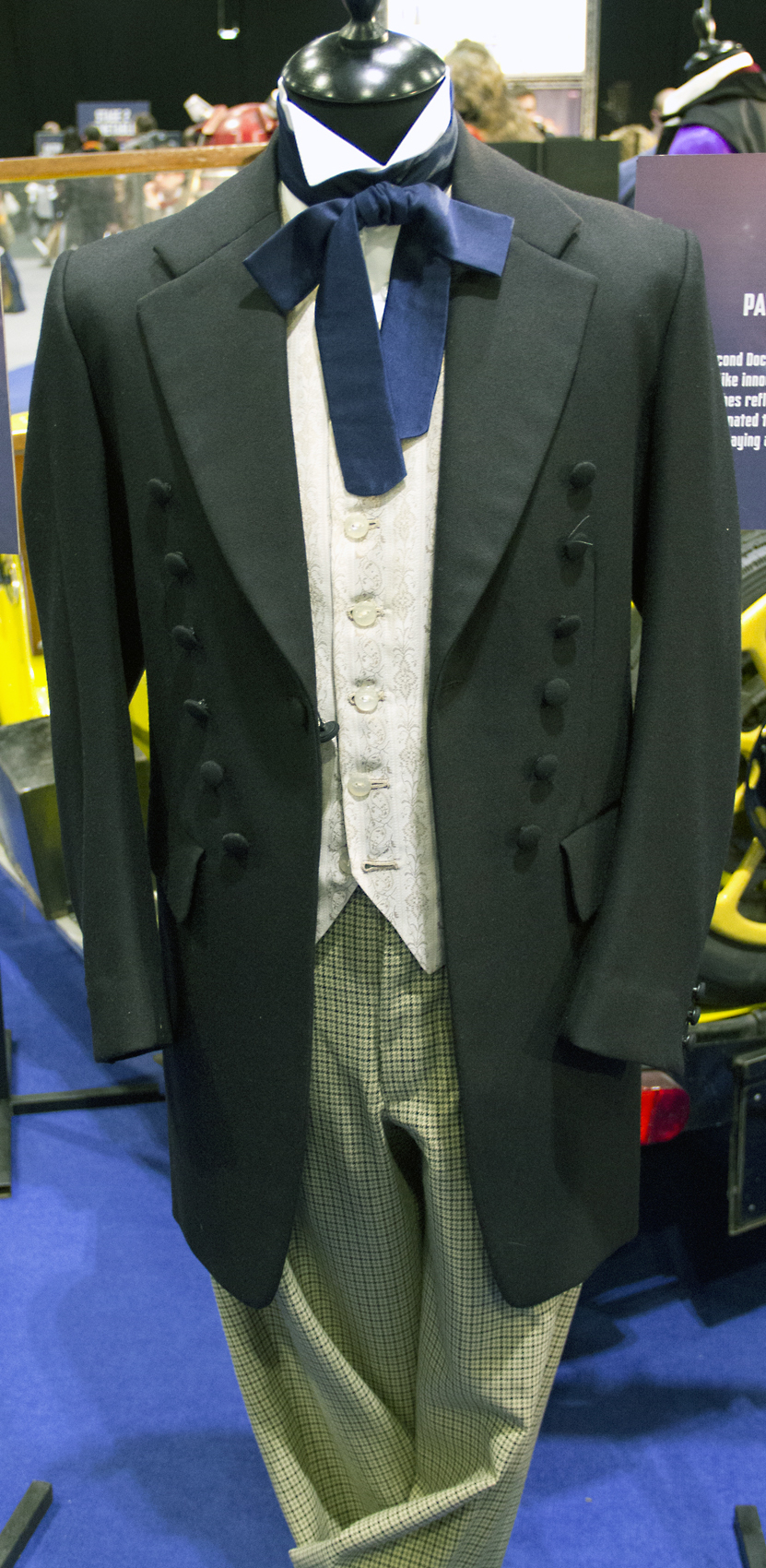
The First Doctor's costume at the Doctor Who 50th Anniversary celebration

From the beginning, the Doctor was a mysterious figure. He appeared to be a frail old man and yet was possessed of unexpected reserves of strength and will. An early writers' guide by script editor David Whitaker describes "Doctor Who" as "frail-looking but wiry and tough as an old turkey". He had tremendous knowledge of scientific matters, and was unable to pilot his TARDIS time ship reliably; his granddaughter Susan said that her grandfather was "a bit forgetful".

William Hartnell described the Doctor as "a wizard", and "a cross between the Wizard of Oz and Father Christmas". Paul McGann, who played the eighth incarnation of the Doctor, said Hartnell's "seemed like a Victorian, someone kind of stern and paterfamilias about him. Something kind but scary". One quirk of the First Doctor was his tendency to become occasionally tongue-tied and stumble over words. Sometimes this was a deliberate acting choice: William Russell recalls that it was Hartnell's idea for the Doctor to get Ian Chesterton's surname wrong, calling him "Chesserman", "Chatterton" and even "Charterhouse". This character choice also gave the series' producers the ability to use takes in which Hartnell flubbed his lines. Due to the series' tight production schedule, it was rarely possible to reshoot such scenes and dubbing the dialogue was usually not an option. Hartnell suffered from undiagnosed arteriosclerosis, which affected his ability to remember lines, increasingly so as his time on the series progressed.

In "Twice Upon a Time", writer Steven Moffat has the Doctor express to a variation of his future companion Bill Potts that he had left Gallifrey, among other reasons, to investigate why good prevails in a universe where evil would seem to have so many advantages. As Bill reflected that none of the First Doctor's future incarnations recognised this fact, the Twelfth Doctor surmised that he and his incarnations were the reason for the universe's balance between good and evil.

=== Appearance ===
Hartnell's costume was hired from Nathans, a theatrical costuming company. The overall look is Victorian-Edwardian: a black frock coat and a light yellow tweed waistcoat over a wing-collared shirt; usually a dark blue ascot tie or ribbon tie and tartan trousers. Hartnell also wore a ring with a large blue stone and a white wig. Additional accessories seen from time to time are a monocle, a carved wooden cane, an opera cape, a scarf, a hat in Astrakhan fur or, in warmer climes, a Panama hat. In "An Unearthly Child", he was seen smoking a large bent tobacco pipe, making him the only incarnation of the Doctor to be seen smoking; it is assumed that he gave up after that serial.

In the original version of the first episode, Hartnell wore a contemporary (1960s) suit. Among the many changes made to the episode in reshooting was the Doctor's (and Susan's) clothes.

== Story style ==
The debut of the Daleks in the second serial turned the programme from a children's series to a national phenomenon. It soon became a show that the whole family gathered to watch, with monsters that children viewed from between their fingers or from behind the sofa. Scripts filled with far-out concepts compensated for the relatively low budget and unsophisticated special effects, laying the foundation for decades of stories to come.

== Later appearances ==
After the regeneration the First Doctor was on screen several more times (not counting flashbacks or charity specials like Dimensions in Time). For the 10th anniversary of the programme in 1973 Hartnell appeared in The Three Doctors, in which Patrick Troughton reprised his role as the Second Doctor. Hartnell was too ill to be able to play the full role as envisioned. He was, therefore, reduced to a pre-recorded cameo role, appearing only on the TARDIS's scanner and the space-time viewer of the Time Lords. It would be the last time he played the Doctor and his last overall acting role.

Hartnell died in 1975, so for the 20th anniversary special "The Five Doctors" in 1983, the role of the First Doctor was played by Richard Hurndall. At the beginning of the programme a film insert of Hartnell's Doctor taken from The Dalek Invasion of Earth was used.

In "The Name of the Doctor", which combined stock footage of Hartnell with Carole Ann Ford in CGI and newly shot footage, the First Doctor is depicted stealing the TARDIS in its original form, picked out by future companion Clara Oswald.

In "The Day of the Doctor", the First Doctor is shown along with the other twelve doctors as they move Gallifrey to a single moment in time. He was voiced by John Guilor, over archival footage of Hartnell.

A child version of the character appears in "Listen" (2014), portrayed by an uncredited Michael Jones.

In the Big Finish audio drama The Light at the End the First Doctor is portrayed by William Russell, who also played Ian Chesterton in both the show and the audio dramas. Russell and fellow co-star Peter Purves (who played Steven Taylor) have performed numerous other audio plays set during this era, usually narrating the stories and doing an impression (rather than an impersonation) of the Doctor's voice while reciting his lines.

In the series 10 finale "The Doctor Falls", David Bradley appeared as the First Doctor, confronting his twelfth incarnation as the latter resists his oncoming regeneration. This scene was followed up in the 2017 Christmas special, "Twice Upon a Time". Bradley had previously portrayed William Hartnell in An Adventure in Space and Time, a 2013 docudrama depicting the creation of Doctor Who. He reprised the role of the First Doctor for a series of audio stories released by Big Finish, titled "The First Doctor Adventures", starting in January 2018.

April 2022 saw Big Finish release a box set of audio dramas starring Stephen Noonan as the First Doctor. Nicholas Briggs has expressed interest in producing further stories with David Bradley. Stephen Noonan also expressed interest in returning for future boxsets. Another First Doctor boxset is scheduled for February 2023, with Noonan starring once again.

The First Doctor appeared as one of the "Guardians of the Edge" (played again by David Bradley), in an afterlife, inside the Doctor's mind in the final Thirteenth Doctor episode, "The Power of the Doctor".

== Other mentions ==
Images of the First Doctor appear in The Power of the Daleks, Day of the Daleks, The Brain of Morbius, Earthshock, Mawdryn Undead, Resurrection of the Daleks, "The Next Doctor", "The Eleventh Hour", "The Vampires of Venice", "Vincent and the Doctor", "The Lodger", "Nightmare in Silver", "The Timeless Children", "The Giggle", "Rogue", "The Story & The Engine", "Wish World", "The Reality War" and The Sarah Jane Adventures story Death of the Doctor. In the episode "The Name of the Doctor", he is seen stealing a TARDIS along with Susan Foreman, before Clara Oswald tells him to steal a different one (colourised footage taken from The Aztecs). He is also seen for a brief second wandering around the Doctor's mind in the end of "The Name of the Doctor", although this time a double was used. He also makes a brief appearance (again using a double) during Missy's exposition of the Twelfth Doctor's battle with android assassins ("The Witch's Familiar").

In Dimensions in Time the Fourth Doctor (Tom Baker) refers to the First as "the grumpy one". A sculpture of his head, along with that of the Second Doctor, appears as well.

The First Doctor is seen as a sketch in John Smith's book alongside other past Doctors in the episode "Human Nature". In "Time Crash", the Tenth Doctor says to the Fifth, "Back when I first started, at the very beginning, I was always trying to be old and grumpy and important, like you do when you're young." A brief clip of the First Doctor from The Time Meddler appears in both "The Next Doctor" and in "The Eleventh Hour".

In a clip from "The Vampires of Venice" the Eleventh Doctor shows his library card, which contains a photograph of the First Doctor and the address of 76 Totters Lane. In "Vincent and the Doctor", both the First and Second Doctors appear on a printout when the Eleventh Doctor has the TARDIS identify him. In "The Big Bang", the Eleventh Doctor briefly mentions the First while bidding his farewell to a sleeping Amy Pond, referring to him as "the daft old man who stole a magic box and ran away".

The Twelfth Doctor refers to his first incarnation's initial lack of altruism prior to meeting the Daleks in "Into the Dalek".

A portrait of the First Doctor is hanging in a UNIT safe house in "The Zygon Invasion".

In "The Devil's Chord" the Fifteenth Doctor visits 1963 and points out the Totters Lane junkyard off in the distance from atop EMI Recording Studios, saying he lived there with his granddaughter Susan. In "Rogue", the First Doctor's face is among the holograms the Doctor shows to the bounty hunter Rogue to prove he is not a shapeshifting Chuldur.
