= Steven Taylor (Doctor Who) =

Fictional character in the TV series Doctor Who

- Doctor Who character
- Peter Purves as Steven in The Time Meddler (1965)
- First appearance: The Chase (1965)
- Last appearance: Tales of the TARDIS (2023)
- Portrayed by: Peter Purves
- Duration: 1965–1966, 2023

In-universe information
- Species: Human
- Gender: Male
- Occupation: Space pilot
- Affiliation: First Doctor
- Home: Earth
- Home era: 23rd century

Steven Taylor is a fictional character played by Peter Purves in the long-running British science fiction television series Doctor Who. A space pilot from Earth in the future, he was a companion of the First Doctor and a regular in the programme from 1965 to 1966. Steven appeared in 10 stories (45 episodes).

== Appearances ==
=== Television ===
Steven first appears in the serial The Chase, when the Doctor and his companions, Ian, Barbara, and Vicki, find him on the planet Mechanus where he crash-landed two years before. He joins the Doctor and Vicki as a companion in the following serial, The Time Meddler, when they discover that he stowed-away in the TARDIS after having escaped the burning Mechonoid City. Steven is a strong-willed individual, who is more capable when there is something physical to do than when there is thinking to be done. He has a finely developed sense of right and wrong, and places a high value on human life.

Steven follows the Doctor through The Daleks' Master Plan, a dark and dangerous adventure that takes the lives of Sara Kingdom and Katarina. He argues with the Doctor when he refuses to prevent the events of The Massacre of St Bartholomew's Eve. Steven is ready to part company with the Doctor over the deaths that happened, in particular that of a woman named Anne Chaplet. He rejoins the Doctor, however, at the same time that they acquired a new travelling companion, a young woman by the name of Dorothea "Dodo" Chaplet, who is apparently a descendant of Anne's.

Steven's journey eventually ends during The Savages, when he decides to accept the responsibility of leading the combined society of Savages and Elders that is attempting a lasting peace. His life beyond that is not explored in the series.

The exact time period that Steven originally came from is not specified in the television series. However, in The Daleks' Master Plan, set in the year 4000, Steven states that he comes from "hundreds of years" before that period.

An older Steven, still played by Purves, returns in an episode of the 60th anniversary spin-off Tales of the TARDIS, alongside Maureen O'Brien as Vicki. Drawn from their respective timelines, Steven and Vicki recall the events of The Time Meddler and their lives after leaving the First Doctor. Steven became a king and has children and grandchildren. Their episode ends with the off-screen voice of William Hartnell, suggesting the First Doctor has joined them.

=== Other media ===
Steven appears in three spin-off novels: The Empire of Glass (1995) of the Virgin Missing Adventures range, and Salvation (1999) and Bunker Soldiers (2001) of the Past Doctor Adventures range. In addition, he appears in many stories of the BBC Short Trips and the Virgin Decalog. Steven, often voiced by Purves, also appears in many Big Finish Productions audio dramas including The Five Companions alongside the Fifth Doctor (Peter Davison), The War to End All Wars, which looks in depth at his life after he left the Doctor, and The Secret History in which he and Vicki meet the Fifth Doctor after a complex plot by the Monk sees the Fifth Doctor replace the First during a crucial adventure.

== Casting ==
Peter Purves originally auditioned for the part of a giant insect in The Web Planet, but failed. He then appeared in the third episode of The Chase as Morton Dill, a "hillbilly". He then appears as Steven in the final episode. Purves had grown "the beginnings of a beard" to disguise the connection between the two characters of the serial. The production team had been looking for a character to replace Barbara Wright (Jacqueline Hill) and Ian Chesterton (William Russell), who were leaving in the serial, and Purves was suggested by both William Hartnell and Maureen O'Brien. Early drafts of the story used the names "Bruck" and "Michael" for the character of the captured astronaut, before settling on "Steven".
