= Jackie Lane (actress) =

British actress (1941–2021)

- Jackie Lane in a publicity photo for Doctor Who: The Massacre (1966)
- Born: 10 July 1941; Manchester, Lancashire, England
- Died: 23 June 2021 (aged 79); Westminster, London, England
- Other name: Jackie Lenya
- Occupation: Actress
- Television: Dodo Chaplet in Doctor Who

Jackie Lane (10 July 1941 – 23 June 2021) was an English actress known for her role as Dodo Chaplet, a companion of the Doctor, in the BBC science fiction television series Doctor Who. She played the part from February to July 1966 alongside William Hartnell as the Doctor.

== Early life ==
Jacqueline Joyce Lane was born in Manchester in 1941 to Jack and Ena Lane. Her father - a theatrical wig maker and make-up artist - brought her into contact with the theatre at an early age and all she wanted to do was act. After graduating from local drama groups, she auditioned for the lead in Tony Richardson's film adaptation of A Taste of Honey. Although she did not get the part, the audition did lead to two years of work at the Library Theatre in Manchester. In between roles, she worked as a temp, having studied shorthand and typing at her parents' insistence.

== Career ==
Lane made occasional appearances in BBC television and radio productions, including Anna Neagle's radio production of Wonderful Things in 1958, with Charlie Drake in the TV production Grandad was a Wrestler in 1959, and as a panelist on Juke Box Jury in 1961. In 1961 she appeared in the TV show Z-Cars, and in 1963 landed the role of Rosemary Gray in the BBC soap opera Compact.

In 1966, she was cast in Doctor Who, playing Dodo Chaplet, alongside the Doctor's first incarnation, played by William Hartnell. Her character stumbled into the Tardis on Wimbledon Common, having mistaken it for a real police box. Her time on the show was short-lived, as the new producer did not renew her year's contract. Even so, she still found herself being interviewed about her time on the show three decades later.

After leaving Doctor Who, Lane became tired of being typecast as Dodo-like characters, and fell out of love with acting. She owned an antiques company for six years, before setting up a voiceover agency, Ad Voice, representing Tom Baker, who played the Fourth Doctor. She also represented Janet Fielding, who would play companion Tegan Jovanka, and managed another series regular, Nicholas Courtney. She retired in 2000.

In 1992, Lane was the subject of Myth Makers #24, a Direct-to-video production by Reeltime Pictures in which she was interviewed about her career. In 2013, the BBC made a 'docudrama' called An Adventure in Space and Time, telling the story of the creation and early days of Doctor Who, as part of the programme's fiftieth anniversary celebrations. Lane appears as a character in the drama, played by Sophie Holt. Lane made a rare TV appearance in 2013, passing along anniversary greetings in the Doctor Who: The Afterparty, celebrating 50 years of Doctor Who.

She died on 7 June 2021, at the age of 79.
