= Peter Purves =

English actor and television presenter (born 1939)

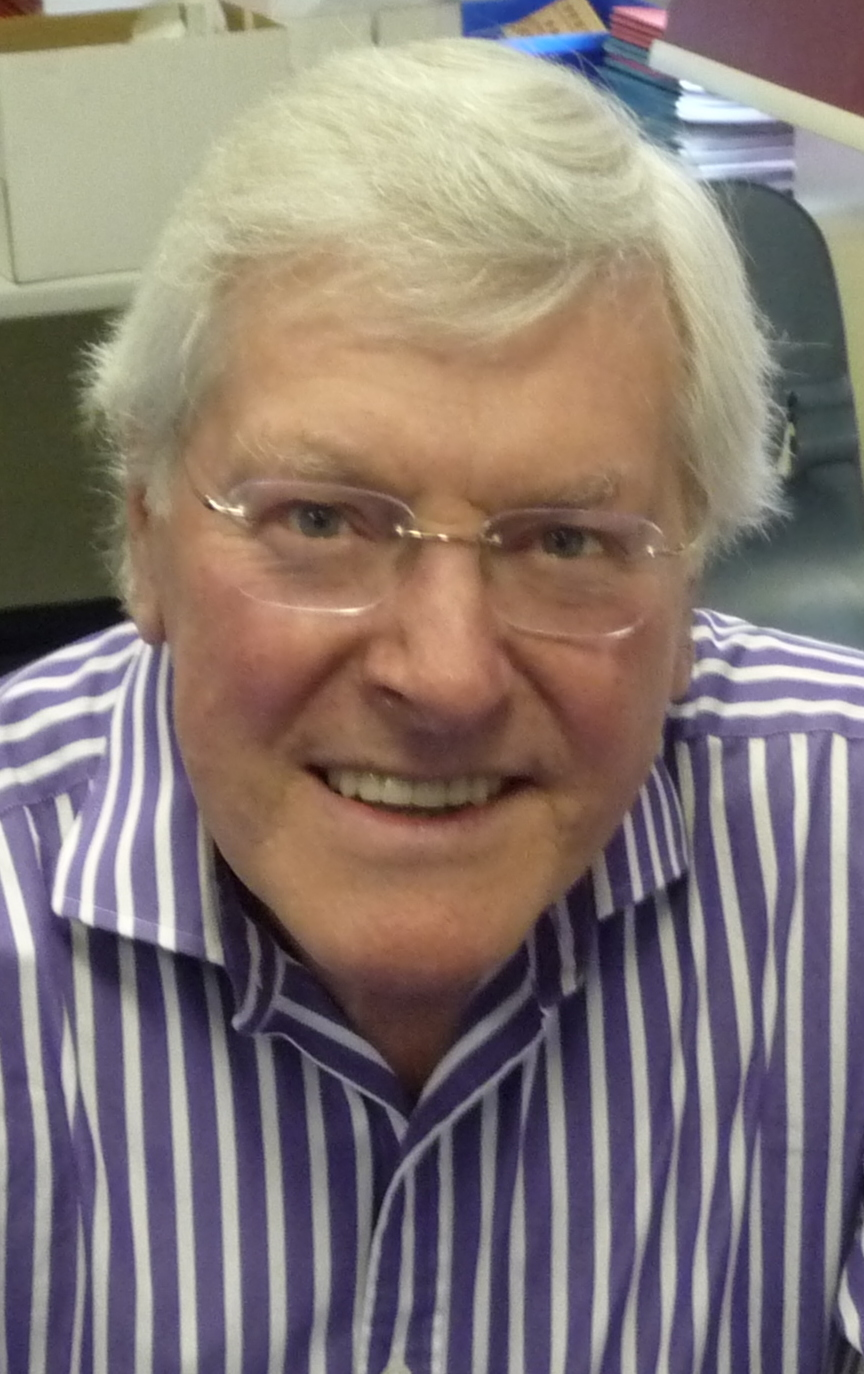
- Purves in 2010
- Born: Peter John Purves; 10 February 1939 (age 87); New Longton, Lancashire, England
- Occupations: Television presenter, actor
- Years active: 1965–present
- Notable work: Steven Taylor in Doctor Who (1965–1966); Blue Peter Presenter (1967–1978)
- Spouses: Gilly Fraser (m. 1962; div. 1982); Kathryn Evans (m. 1982)
- Children: 2
- Website: www.peterpurves.net

Peter John Purves (/ˈpɜːrvɪs/; born 10 February 1939) is an English television presenter and actor. Beginning his career as an actor, he joined Doctor Who to play Steven Taylor, a companion of the First Doctor, which he played from 1965 until 1966. In 1967, he became a presenter on the children's programme Blue Peter, where he remained for eleven years. He has continued to make appearances on TV, including coverage of the Crufts dog show.

== Early life ==
Purves was born in New Longton, Lancashire. His father was a tailor who also ran a hotel in Blackpool for a short period. He was educated at the independent Arnold School in Blackpool and in the sixth form at Barrow-in-Furness Grammar School for Boys for a year, where he took A-levels and gained a pass in mathematics. He originally planned to go into teaching, training at Alsager College of Education, but began to act with the Barrow-in-Furness Repertory Company instead.

== Doctor Who ==
At 26 years old in 1965, Purves first appeared in Doctor Who in the role of Morton Dill, an American tourist, in The Chase after being cast by director Richard Martin.

Purves then appeared later in the same story as space pilot Steven Taylor, and became well known to television audiences in that role, as one of the early time-travelling companions in the programme, when the Doctor was played by William Hartnell. He has provided DVD commentaries for many of the surviving Doctor Who episodes he appeared in and documents the making of each of his Doctor Who stories in his autobiography, Here's One I Wrote Earlier. He was also a good friend of the actor Jon Pertwee, who played the Third Doctor.

Purves has said that he prefers the historical stories on the show, such as The Massacre of St Bartholomew's Eve and The Myth Makers.

In 2007, Purves returned to the role of Steven Taylor in the audio drama Mother Russia and has portrayed him in several additional audio dramas in the years since.

In 2023, Purves reprised his role as Steven in the series Tales of the TARDIS.

== Blue Peter ==
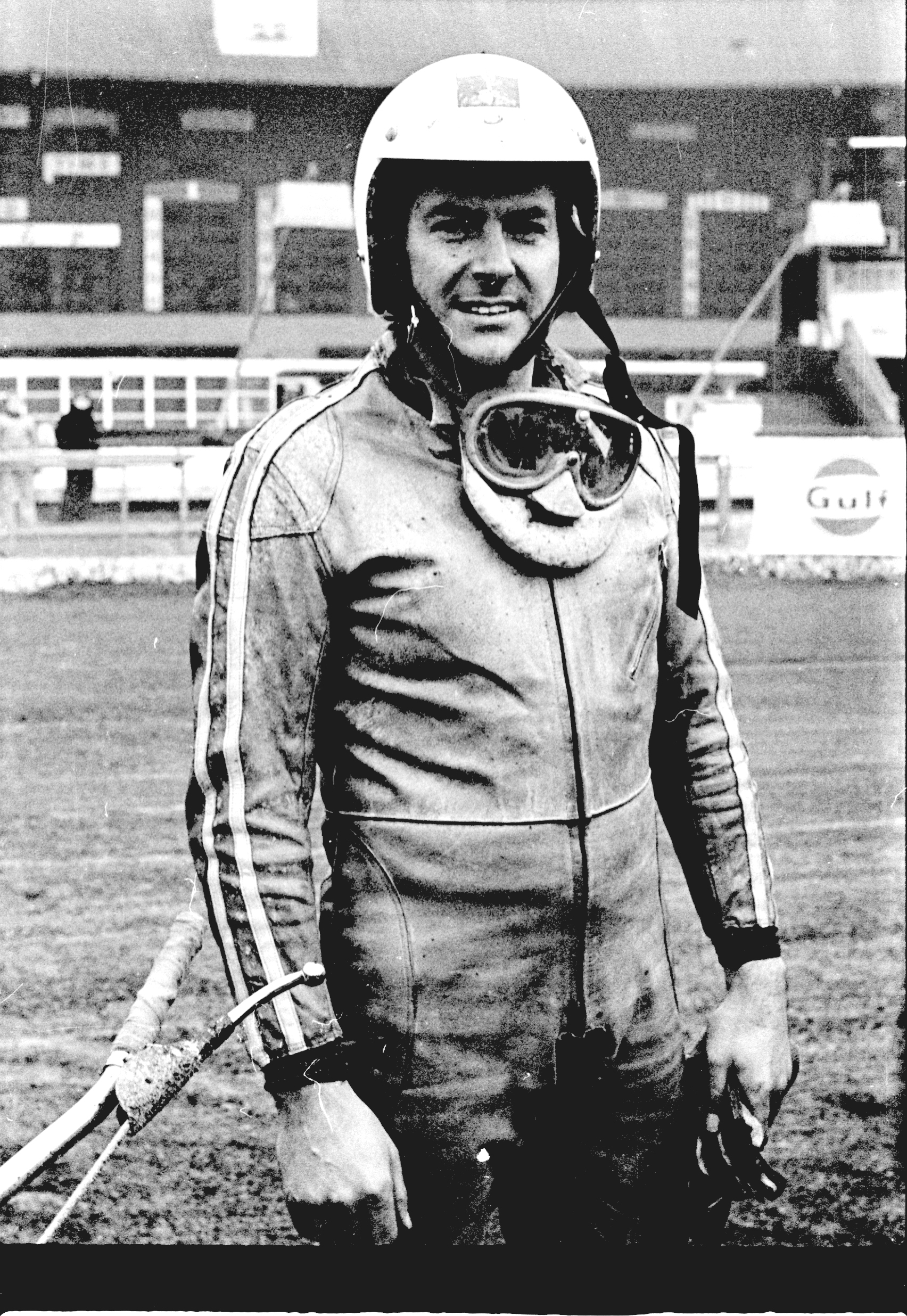
Purves in 1976, while covering the White City Rebels for Blue Peter

After leaving Doctor Who, Purves became a regular presenter on the children's magazine programme Blue Peter from 1967 to 1978. He co-presented Blue Peter, first with John Noakes and Valerie Singleton – the "Val, John and Pete" line-up – and then with Noakes and Lesley Judd. After Noakes, Purves is the longest-serving male Blue Peter presenter.

Purves maintained his connection to Doctor Who throughout his time on Blue Peter, often hosting special features on the programme and interviewing the actors. These included clips from episodes which are otherwise now lost, including The Daleks' Master Plan, in which Purves himself had appeared.

Dogs have featured in Purves's career since his Blue Peter days when he was given charge of one of the "Blue Peter Pets", Petra, a German Shepherd cross. Purves also presented the spin-off Blue Peter Special Assignment. He also appeared on The All Star Record Breakers from 1974 - 1981 with Singleton, Noakes and Judd.

== Later television appearances ==
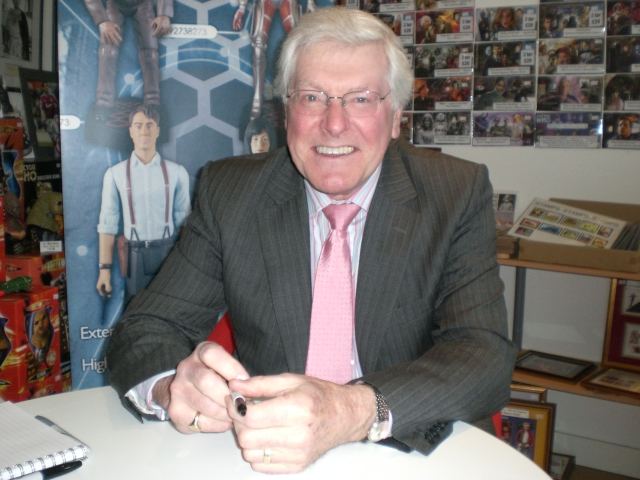
Purves at The Television and Movie Store in Norwich in March 2009

After leaving Blue Peter, Purves presented Stopwatch and We're Going Places, then had spells as the front man for darts events on the BBC and as presenter of the long-running BBC1 motorcycle trials series Kick Start.

Purves's later TV career has included cameo appearances in episodes of the soap opera EastEnders and sitcom The Office. In The Office episode "Training Day" Purves played himself in a customer care training video that David Brent and his staff were being shown (Purves is in fact a qualified business trainer and a motivational speaker).

Purves has had a 40-year association with television coverage of major dog shows such as Crufts and his 2007 appearance as a judge on the reality TV programme The Underdog Show. He also writes for the dog press and regularly presents at dog award shows. Marking his 70th birthday, his 2009 autobiography Here's One I Wrote Earlier was released at The Kennel Club.

== Theatre ==
Purves has worked as a pantomime director and has directed over 30 pantomime productions. In December 2012, he portrayed Alderman Fitzwarren in Dick Whittington at Harpenden Public Halls: this was the first time he performed in pantomime since 1985. He is also an after-dinner speaker.

In 2024 he appeared as Charles Dickens in a live radio play of A Christmas Carol at the Hawth Theatre in Crawley. He performed the same role in 2025.

== Personal life ==
Purves lived for a time in the Bilton area of Rugby, Warwickshire, and then Northamptonshire. He now lives in the Suffolk village of Sibton with his wife, the West End actress Kathryn Evans. He was previously married from 1962 to 1982 to a Leeds-born playwright, Gilly Fraser (actual name Gillian Emmett). In 2008, Valerie Singleton revealed she had enjoyed a "brief fling" with Purves when he was "between marriages".

Purves is a supporter of Tottenham Hotspur football club, having attended his first game at White Hart Lane in 1959. Purves is an atheist.

In December 2022, Purves received an honorary fellowship from the University of Central Lancashire. A university spokesman said his "inspirational career" had shown "a significant contribution in services to television, in acting and presenting".

In January 2026, Purves was a guest on the BBC radio programme Private Passions.

== Credits ==
=== TV career ===
- Z Cars (3 episodes 1964, 1965 played Cord)
- Doctor Who (46 episodes, 1965–1966 played Steven Taylor)
- Blue Peter (1967–1978 presenter)
- Blue Peter Special Assignment (1977–1981 presenter)
- Stopwatch (40 episodes, 1978–1981 presenter)
- We're Going Places (23 episodes, 1978–1980 presenter)
- All Star Record Breakers (1974 - 1981 as himself)
- Kick Start (1981–1992 presenter)
- Crufts (1978–2019)
- The Office (2001, episode "Training" as himself)
- John Noakes TV Hero (2017 as himself)https://www.bbc.co.uk/programmes/b09jcx7x
- Antiques Roadshow (2019 as himself)
- This Morning (2020 as himself)
- Pointless Celebrities (2013-2022 as himself)
- Tales of the TARDIS (2023, episode "The Time Meddler" as Steven Taylor)

=== Audio dramas ===
Year	Title	Role
2007	Doctor Who: Mother Russia	Steven Taylor / The First Doctor
2010	Doctor Who: The Suffering	Steven Taylor / The First Doctor
2011	Doctor Who: The Perpetual Bond	Steven Taylor / The First Doctor
2011	Doctor Who: The Cold Equations	Steven Taylor / The First Doctor
2011	Doctor Who: Tales from the Vault	Steven Taylor / The First Doctor
2011	Doctor Who: The First Wave	Steven Taylor / The First Doctor
2011	Doctor Who: The Five Companions	Steven Taylor / The First Doctor
2012	Doctor Who: The Anachronauts	Steven Taylor / The First Doctor
2012	Doctor Who: The Burning Prince	Steven Taylor / The First Doctor
2012	Doctor Who: Return of the Rocket Men	Steven Taylor / The First Doctor
2013	Doctor Who: Upstairs	Steven Taylor / The First Doctor
2013	Doctor Who: The Light at the End	Steven Taylor / The First Doctor
2014	Doctor Who: The War to End All Wars	Steven Taylor / The First Doctor
2014	Doctor Who: The Bounty of Ceres	Steven Taylor / The First Doctor
2014	Doctor Who: An Ordinary Life	Steven Taylor / The First Doctor
2015	Doctor Who: Flywheel Revolution	Steven Taylor / The First Doctor
2015	Doctor Who: The Secret History	Steven Taylor / The First Doctor
2015	Doctor Who: The First Doctor Volume One	Steven Taylor / The First Doctor
2015	Doctor Who: Etheria	Steven Taylor / The First Doctor
2016	Doctor Who: This Sporting Life	Steven Taylor / The First Doctor
2016	Doctor Who: The Ravelli Conspiracy	Steven Taylor / The First Doctor
2016	Doctor Who: The Sontarans	Steven Taylor / The First Doctor
2017	Doctor Who: The First Doctor Volume Two	Steven Taylor / The First Doctor
2017	Doctor Who: Short Trips: O Tannenbaum	Steven Taylor / The First Doctor
2018	Doctor Who: The Dalek Occupation of Winter	Steven Taylor / The First Doctor
2018	Doctor Who: An Ideal World	Steven Taylor / The First Doctor
2018	Doctor Who: Entanglement	Steven Taylor / The First Doctor
2018	Doctor Who: The Crash of the UK-201	Steven Taylor / The First Doctor
2019	Doctor Who: The First Doctor Volume 03	Steven Taylor / The First Doctor
2019	Doctor Who: Daughter of the Gods	Steven Taylor / The First Doctor
2019	Doctor Who: Peace in Our Time	Steven Taylor / The First Doctor
2020	Doctor Who: Out of the Deep	Steven Taylor / The First Doctor
2021	Doctor Who: The Secrets of Det-Sen	Steven Taylor / The First Doctor
2025	Doctor Who: The Living Darkness	Steven Taylor / The First Doctor
2025	Doctor Who: Families	Steven Taylor / The First Doctor
2025	Doctor Who: A Feast of Steven	Steven Taylor / The First Doctor
2026	Doctor Who: The Time Splitters	Steven Taylor / The First Doctor
