= Stuart Humphryes =

English digital artist and colouriser (born 1969)

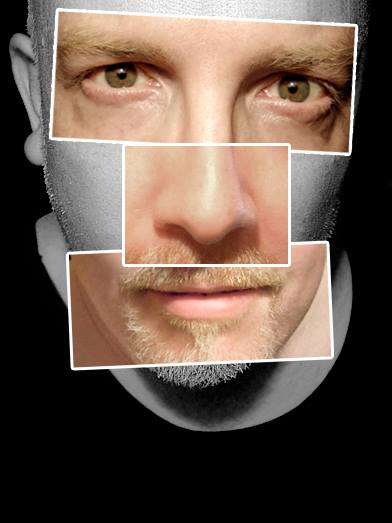
- Stuart Humphryes, known as BabelColour
- Born: 10 December 1969 (age 56); Hampshire, England
- Other name: BabelColour
- Occupations: Photo enhancer & colourisation artist
- Years active: 2005–present
- Notable work: The Colors of Life; The Mind of Evil; Terror of the Zygons
- Website: babelcolour.com

Stuart Humphryes (born 10 December 1969) is an English multimedia artist for print, film and television, and a social media content creator, chiefly known for his work enhancing early colour photography. His photo enhancement book The Colors of Life was published in 2023. He first rose to prominence colourising episodes of the British television series Doctor Who. He is widely known by his alias "BabelColour", a public persona that was created in 2006 with the launch of his YouTube channel.

== Photographic enhancement process ==
Humphryes is principally known for the enhancement of early colour photography, such as Autochromes and Paget plates. He has popularised the autochrome process amongst the general public, with over 200,000 followers on his autochrome-enhancement Twitter feed. In interviews, Humphryes has stated that his photographic enhancement work includes the following steps: The digital removal of physical flaws; the restoration/recreation of any missing sections of the image; removal of dirt and blemishes; removal of staining or colour bleed; re-adjustment of saturation and luminance levels; colour rebalancing; noise reduction; and the employment of deep learning neural-network algorithms to remove grain whilst enhancing detail definition.

== In print ==
Between 2025 and 2026, seven editions of the monthly Best of British' magazine had covers which were enhanced and colourised by Humphryes. An editorial detailing his contributions to the magazine and his wider photo enhancement and Doctor Who-related work was published in August 2025.

In October 2024, Dutch photography magazine Digifoto Pro ran an 11-page feature and interview with Humphryes about his photo enhancement work

In August 2024, issue 337 of Best of British magazine published an article written by Humphryes concerning his uncle's appearance in a 1964 BBC Documentary entitled The Exceptional Child

In May 2024, the Vice Media Group ran an interview feature on Humphryes and his photographic enhancements, which appeared in various guises on their Vice Instagram social media platform and website Vice.com

The January 2024 edition of the UK-based print magazine PrintWeek published a three-page feature on Humphryes and his photographic enhancement work. An abridged featurette also appeared on their website

On 12 October 2023, The Times ran a feature on Humphryes' enhancement work and book.

On 3 October 2023, The Guardian's Eyewitness centre-spread ran a feature of photographic enhancements by Humphryes, to mark the publication of his book The Colors of Life. This newspaper article ran longside an online feature.

In September 2023, Humphryes released a large format art-book entitled The Colors of Life, which collated over 200 of his enhanced autochromes and paget plates. The book was released by German publishers Gestalten.

In January 2023, The Radio Times interviewed Humphryes about his former colourisation work on Doctor Who and his opinions relating to the prospect of new colourisations for the series' 60th anniversary.

On 18 July 2022, the Portuguese news magazine Visão ran a feature-interview with Humphryes, exploring his photo enhancement work.

On 3 September 2021, The Times ran a 2-page article about the optical illusion of colour assimilation, prompted by a viral tweet by Humphryes, whom they interviewed about the phenomenon.

In August 2021, The Simple Things Magazine, issue #110, featured Humphryes' autochrome enhancements with the editor's recommendation to follow his Twitter and Instagram accounts. However, the magazine unintentionally published the wrong Twitter account details.

The June 2021 Doctor Who Magazine issue #564 published a 4-page article written by Humphryes on his search for, and restoration of, previously missing photographs of director Christopher Baker.

In March 2021, the French youth magazine Topo ran a 2-page feature on his photo enhancement work, focusing on the French roots of the autochrome process and its use during World War I.

The December 2020 and January 2021 issues of the US-based Wild West magazine included restoration and colourisation work by Humphryes, who had employed artificial neural networking to reconstruct and enhance the face of Billy the Kid from the only verified tintype portrait.

In October 2020, The National newspaper printed a feature on Humphryes and his autochrome enhancement work. The article focused on the Gulf region and consisted of an interview and restoration galleries.

In May 2020, to mark the 75th anniversary of Victory in Europe Day, the Royal Mail issued commemorative coin presentation packs which included colourisation work by Humphryes. This work was marked by an interview and article in The Daily Mail on 3 May 2020, entitled "The Artist Putting His Own Stamp On Victory".

In February 2019, the London Evening Standard ran a feature on his colourisation work. Humphryes stated, "I try to be bold with my colours – most colourisers seem frightened of the medium and make their work pastel and faded. I’m of the opinion that if I’m going to add colour I may as well go the whole hog and make it bold and bright and colourful. That’s what real life should be, after all!"

In August 2018, the Edinburgh Evening News ran an interview with Humphryes about his restoration of colour film of 1930s Edinburgh.

In 2015, Humphryes colourised the cover of Mark Iveson's biographical reference book Cursed Horror Stars.

In 2012, Humphryes wrote a treatise on Doctor Who entitled 'Teatime and an Open Mind' for the non-fiction book You and Who. The book's editor J. R. Southall wrote in Starburst Magazine, "That internet legend from YouTube, known usually as BabelColour, submitted a much longer essay. It was an excellent piece of writing, and very important for a couple of reasons... it kind of gave the whole project a feeling of legitimacy. Now I could tell people that Stuart Humphryes had made a submission already, and even quote an extract from it as an example". In November 2014 Humphryes was one of the "big names in the Whovian community" interviewed by the Houston Press for his positive critical opinion of Series 8 of Doctor Who.

In 2005, Humphryes colourised Tele-snaps for issue 2 of Nothing at the End of the Lane – the magazine of Doctor Who Research and Restoration – in which he was interviewed about his colourisation work. He returned to this publication in 2008 to colourise the cover of their omnibus reprint of issues 1 and 2.

== Social media ==
Humphryes runs the Babelcolour account on Twitter/X. In June 2020 he began tweeting early colour photographic enhancements, exceeding 200,000 followers by October 2022. In 2025, Humphryes extended his online presence by establishing photo enhancement accounts on Facebook, Instagram, Bluesky and Threads.

=== Notable posts ===
On 15 September 2022, Humphryes tweeted original colour footage from the 1952 Lying-in-state and funeral procession for the late King George VI. This tweet went viral and was subsequently featured by The Independent, The Guardian, the Daily Mirror, the Daily Star and LADbible. and was discussed on Jazz FM radio.

In October 2021, his series of enhanced Paget plates, originally taken by Frank Hurley during Ernest Shackleton's Imperial Trans-Antarctic Expedition, were featured by Live Science.

On 30 August 2021, his viral tweet of Øyvind Kolås's colour assimilation grid prompted an article in various tabloids and The Times.

On 8 November 2018, Humphryes tweeted his own recitation of the Great War poem "In Flanders Fields" to mark the centenary of Armistice Day. This video was used by the Daily Mirror to head its article on war poetry.

On 30 September 2018, his tweet of a 1943 photograph, apparently showing the anachronous use of a mobile device, made international news. In the UK it was covered by media sites such as LADbible. and tabloid newspapers including the Daily Mirror, and The Sun, whilst in the US it was picked up by Fox News. Other international coverage included stories in Russia, Taiwan, Hungary, China and Vietnam.

On 29 August 2018 he tweeted colour film of 1930s Edinburgh which also prompted an article and interview in the Edinburgh Evening News.

== Film colourisation ==
=== The Daleks' Master Plan ===
In 2005 Humphryes collaborated with James Russell, a design engineer who was one of the founder members of the Doctor Who Restoration Team and the son of film director Ken Russell to colourise surviving 35mm film from the 1965 Doctor Who serial The Daleks' Master Plan. The colourised footage was incorporated into "The Dalek Tapes" documentary on the 2006 DVD release of Genesis of the Daleks. and as an extra on the Destiny of the Daleks blu-ray release in 2022.

In 2026 Humphryes stated that this early experimental work was designed as a proof of concept for the BBC, to demonstrate that film colourisation could be achieved outside of the dominant US-based colourisation houses, and its success paved the way for subsequent BBC colourisations of both Doctor Who and Hancock's Half Hour

=== The Mind of Evil ===
In 2009 Humphryes and Russell reunited to assess the viability of re-colourising the first episode of the 1971 Doctor Who serial The Mind of Evil which only existed in the BBC Archives as a monochrome film print. Their test sequence eventually led to the Doctor Who Restoration Team commissioning Humphryes in 2011 to recolourise the entire episode. According to Doctor Who: The Complete History, it was achieved "by a combination of hand colouring by multimedia artist Stuart Humphryes, and motion estimation software". Between 2011 and 2013 Humphryes was the sole colourising artist working alongside the video restoration company SVS Resources to complete the commercial colourisation of The Mind of Evil for the BBC.

==== Screenings ====
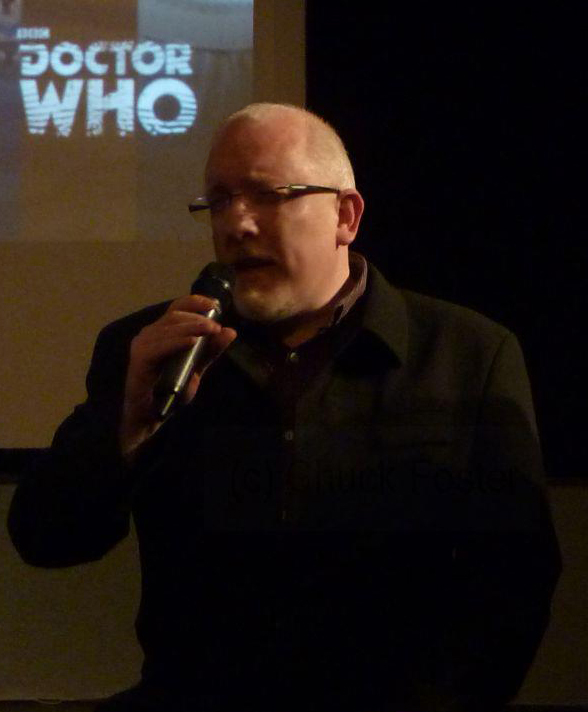
Humphryes on stage at the British Film Institute

The newly colourised Mind of Evil was premiered at the British Film Institute on 10 March 2013. Humphryes was in attendance to answer questions on stage about the re-colourisation process The recolourised episodes also received a special screening, with a Q&A Restoration Panel, at Birmingham's annual Flatpack Film Festival on Saturday 30 March 2013 and at the Belfast Film Festival on Thursday 18 April 2013.

Following its original release on DVD in 2013, the re-colourised version became the broadcast default, being subsequently televised in the US on Retro TV on 15 October 2014 and KBTC Public Television on Saturday 23 January 2016. It is also the version currently available for subscription download in the US on BritBox and was live-streamed by Twitch on four occasions in June 2018 and January 2019. It was later released on Blu-ray in 2021.

Clips and details of the serial's recolourisation were covered by a special feature on the BBC evening news on 12 June 2013.

=== Terror of the Zygons ===
In February 2012 Humphryes was engaged by SVS Resources to recolourise monochrome footage from the 1975 Doctor Who serial Terror of the Zygons in preparation for a special extended "director's cut" of the story on DVD. The monochrome film - consisting of a cutting copy and dub track in mixed colour and monochrome formats - had been discovered amongst the estate of the serial's film editor Ian McKendrick and returned to the BBC in 2008. The recolourisation work was completed to a tight deadline and consequently employed some shortcut techniques, including flat colour washes for certain elements such as clothing, which would not normally be employed by Humphryes.

=== Colourisation process ===
Most commercial colourisation processes involve the use of either masks, layers or the segmentation method. The process used by Humphryes however, is unusual in that it does not employ these methods of separating colour to produce each key frame but instead each individual frame is colourised as a single completed image. A consequence of this means that although the finished product can achieve greater realism the work is very labour-intensive, with around 7000 fully colourised key frames required to produce 20 minutes of footage. This equates to an average of 1 in every 5 frames being fully colourised as key frames for PAL video. According to an interview with Humphryes in the Radio Times it consequently took him 18 months to recolourise the required quantity of key frames for 'The Mind of Evil' episode one.

== Critical reception ==
Humphryes was dubbed a "colourisation and compositing legend" by the BBC's AfterShow. Starburst Magazine stated Humphryes was an “internet legend” whilst the Edinburgh News noted that Humphryes was lauded by industry chiefs as a "composition legend". The Houston Press asserted: "His work is almost unrivaled in popularity."

Doctor Who Magazine stated, "Stuart's work on colours is exceptionally good, especially with difficult areas like skin and hair and this sets a new benchmark for the colourisation of film recordings" SFX Magazine stated, "The results are seriously impressive", with Starburst Magazine considering his work "astonishing". On-line reviews of his output have stated "The result is stunning... with skin tones looking particularly impressive" [Telly Tech], "Babel's work is astonishing" [Immaterial]; "the depth and accuracy of colour application is superbly observed and as delicate as the brushstrokes of a Constable or a Rembrandt" [Eye of Horus]; "the results are really quite stunning." [Chilled Monkey Brainz] and "Skin tones and hair colour is rarely done well, even by professional colourising companies, but Stuart seemed to have nailed it" [Home Cinema Choice].

His DVD colourisation work was praised by SFX Magazine, Doctor Who Magazine, Starburst Magazine, the Radio Times, Doctor Who Online, DVD Talk, Nerdist and an array of on-line genre sites and blogs.

He received commendation for his colourisation work in 2015 from the Doctor Who showrunner, head writer and producer Steven Moffat, who cited Humphryes as one of "the next generation of creatives". In September 2017 Moffat recorded an anniversary tribute to Humphryes on YouTube, stating his colourisation output was "beautiful, impeccable, gorgeous work and genuinely among my favourite things on the internet" He has also received recommendations for his colourised work from BBC America and the Houston Press with his contributions to Doctor Who and the field of colourisation being the subject of numerous interviews and podcasts.

== YouTube ==
Humphryes established The BabelColour Channel on YouTube on 10 August 2006, focusing entirely on Doctor Who content. His final upload was in March 2018, followed by a three-year hiatus. He has announced that he is currently working on new YouTube content for release in 2022/2023. Seventy-four videos are currently available, which have accrued 10 million views (as of September 2020). The Houston Press asserted: "BabelColour is one of the top producers of on-line video content. His work is almost unrivaled in popularity", with the BBC's AfterShow and the Edinburgh Evening News both citing Humphryes as a "colourisation and compositing legend".

Twenty-four of his videos have been featured as the monthly YouTube recommendation in the official Doctor Who Magazine and three have been the monthly recommendations in SFX Magazine. Two of his videos were listed in the "Top Ten Doctor Who Videos on YouTube" by The Stage, while he was nominated by Digital Spy in its article "8 Most Amazing Fan Videos on YouTube", and the Houston Press cited Humphryes as one of "5 Fans Who Do Doctor Who Better than the BBC".

His memorial tribute to Nicholas Courtney was shared by The Guardian, and his Christmas tribute was included in the Metro's article "8 things we'd like to see in the Doctor Who Christmas Special". His "Every Doctor Who Story" video and updates have over 1.6 million views and received recommendations from the io9 website, BBC America, BuzzFeed, The Verge, Nerdist.com and Screen Rant amongst many others.

in September 2017, the Radio Times ran a feature on the appearance of Steven Moffat in Humphryes' 11th Anniversary YouTube upload – a story which was widely covered by other news sites, including NME, IMDb, Digital Spy, GamesRadar, and Screen Rant and recommended in Doctor Who Magazine issue 517 (November 2017).

His YouTube videos have included contributions from Doctor Who producers Steven Moffat and Philip Hinchcliffe, impressionist and comedian Jon Culshaw, the actors John Levene, Nicholas Briggs and Nathan Head, director Graeme Harper, producer George Gallaccio, former Doctor Who Magazine editors Clayton Hickman and Tom Spilsbury, writers and historians David J. Howe and Richard Bignell, producer and presenter Christel Dee and the voice artists Jacob Dudman, John Guilor and Jonathon Carley.

=== The Ten Doctors ===
Between 2009 and 2015 Humphryes uploaded a four-part web series entitled The Ten Doctors. It was an unofficial Doctor Who drama incorporating re-edited archival material from TV shows and movies connected by newly recorded dialogue and special effects. Episode three was premièred at the "Armada Con 23" Doctor Who Convention before its on-line release. The trailers and episodes have exceeded 950,000 views on YouTube. The web series has been recommended by SFX Magazine and the Doctor Who Fan Club of Australia. Humphryes has been interviewed about the project a number of times, including in the Houston Press and the on-line magazine Theta Morbius Times (Issue 1; 2010), with the opening episode being nominated as one of the "8 Most Amazing Fan Videos on YouTube" by Digital Spy. The series has since been made private.

=== The Timeless Doctors ===
Originally conceived as a re-imagining of his 4-part web-serial The Ten Doctors, Humphryes began work on the venture in 2019, under the title of The Ten Doctors Re-Imagined. This title was changed the following year to The Timeless Doctors, with the scope of the production expanding from its original premise into a brand new 150-minute Fan film. Its extended cast list includes Nicholas Briggs as the voice of the Daleks, impressionist and comedian Jon Culshaw as the Third Doctor, actor John Guilor (reprising his role as the First Doctor from the BBC's 50th-anniversary story The Day of the Doctor), Jonathon Carley as the War Doctor (a role he portrays for Big Finish Productions), as well as three former members of the Doctor Who production team: producers Philip Hinchcliffe and George Gallaccio with the director Graeme Harper (all reprising their roles as The Doctor from the 1976 Doctor Who serial The Brain of Morbius).

The production's four trailers were recommended in Doctor Who Magazine issue 546 (January 2020), issue 573 (February 2022), issue 577 (June 2022) and issue 591 (July 2023), and the 2021 Doctor Who fiction anthology Forgotten Lives, edited by Philip Purser-Hallard, promoted the forthcoming fan-film by way of the book's afterword.

The project's use of AI upscaling prompted the inclusion of Humphryes in an article on neural networking by Digital Trends.

=== The Almost Doctors ===
In 2017, at the suggestion of actor and screenwriter Mark Gatiss, Humphryes created a two-part web series entitled "The Almost Doctors". It incorporated newly recorded voice work by Jonathon Carley and Jacob Dudman to chronicle the list of actors shortlisted for the role of Doctor Who in the 1960s and '70s. The series employed a combination of editing, CGI and video compositing techniques to lift actors from archive film and place them into contemporary episodes of Doctor Who. In June 2017 the BBC's AfterShow promoted the series, referring to Humphryes as a "colourisation and compositing legend", with BBC America promoting episode two as "exceptional". Episode one was also recommended as a monthly pick in Doctor Who Magazine issue 514 and episode two was recommended in Doctor Who Magazine issue 512.

=== Webcast ===
In April 2020, Humphryes was thanked in the credits of two Doctor Who lockdown webcasts – firstly a special 13-minute The Sarah Jane Adventures minisode entitled "Farewell, Sarah Jane", billed by its writer, Russell T Davies, as "The final Sarah Jane Adventure", and also in a sequel to "The Girl in the Fireplace", which was entitled "Pompadour", starring Sophia Myles and written by Steven Moffat.

== Television appearances ==
In 1996 he appeared as a contestant in two episodes of the UK Gold TV quiz series Goldmaster. In 1999, his role as fallback contestant for BBC1's prime-time evening game show Whatever You Want was reported in Doctor Who Magazine issue 276, which ran with a photograph of Humphryes in costume alongside the other 3 contestants.

== Background information ==
Humphryes graduated from Suffolk College with a BA(Hons) degree in Design Communications.

Despite having risen to prominence in the fields of colourisation and photographic enhancement, Humphreys has done so on an amateur basis and states that such work is a hobby. After 14 years with the British Red Cross he currently works as a Local Government Officer and has worked for London Borough of Merton since 2007.

Between 2006 and 2008 he produced work for the BabelFish Colourisation website. In 2012 he established his own colourisation website.

In 2014 Humphryes assisted researchers of the BBC2 documentary series 'The Secret History of My Family', which was broadcast on Thursday 10 March 2016. Episode one chronicled the family and descendants of his 4 x Great-Grandfather Robert Gadbury, tracing their lineage from 1830s London to present-day Tasmania. Humphryes is second cousin (twice removed) to former Tasmanian premier Albert Ogilvie.
