= DWO =

DWO or Dwo may refer to:

- Doctor Who Online
- Dynasty Warriors Online
- Dwo, a deity worshipped by the Bwa people
