= Doctor Who missing episodes =

Currently lost episodes of Doctor Who

Material from missing Doctor Who serials has been released in books and in audio form on CD, and several episodes have been animated for DVD release. DVDs have also been released of surviving episodes from otherwise-missing serials, and tele-snaps exist of many missing episodes.

Some episodes of the long-running British science-fiction television programme Doctor Who are no longer held by the BBC. Between 1967 and 1978, the BBC routinely deleted archive programmes for various practical reasons—lack of space, scarcity of materials, and a lack of rebroadcast rights. As a result, 95 of 253 episodes from the programme's first six years are missing, primarily from seasons 3, 4 and 5, leaving 26 serials incomplete. Many more were considered lost until recovered from various sources, mostly overseas broadcasters and private collectors.

Doctor Who is not unique in its losses, as many broadcasters routinely cleared their archives in this manner. Until the BBC changed its archiving policy in 1978, thousands of hours of programming in all genres were deleted. Other affected BBC series include Hancock's Half Hour, Dad's Army, Z-Cars, The Likely Lads, The Wednesday Play, Till Death Us Do Part, Steptoe and Son, Dixon of Dock Green and Not Only... But Also. ITV regional franchisees, such as Rediffusion Television and Associated Television, also deleted many programmes, including early videotaped episodes of The Avengers.

Doctor Who is unusual in that each of its missing episodes survives in audio form, recorded off-air by fans at home. (Note: On a smaller scale, audio copies exist for all of At Last the 1948 Show and Till Death Us Do Part – 2 and 13 missing episodes, respectively.) Most episodes are also represented by production stills, tele-snaps, or short video clips. Furthermore, after careful restoration, all but one of the 1970s episodes are available in authentic full colour.

Efforts to locate the missing episodes have continued, both by the BBC and by fans of the series. The recovered episodes have been extensively restored for release on VHS and DVD; surviving soundtracks have been released on cassette and compact disc. Many missing episodes have had their visuals reconstructed, either through specially commissioned animation or use of surviving footage and photographs.

== Background ==
Between approximately 1967 and 1978, large quantities of videotape and film stored in the BBC's Engineering department and film libraries were wiped or destroyed to make way for newer programmes. This happened for several reasons, primarily the belief that there was no practical value to their retention.

The actors' union Equity had actively fought against the introduction of TV recording since the 1950s, when it first became a practical proposition. Before workable television recording was developed, if a broadcaster wished to repeat a programme (usually a one-off play), they had to re-hire the actors to perform it again, live, for additional fees. Equity's concern was that if broadcasters kept recordings of the original performances, they would be able to re-broadcast them indefinitely, which would reduce the amount of new production and threaten the livelihoods of its members. Although Equity could not prevent recording altogether, it added standard clauses to its members' contracts that stipulated that recordings could only be repeated a limited number of times within a specific timeframe, and deliberately set the fees for further use so high that broadcasters would consider it unjustifiable to spend so much money repeating an old programme rather than making a new one. Consequently, recordings whose repeat rights had expired were considered to be of no further domestic use to the broadcasters.

Film can containing a 16 mm film telerecording print of The Evil of the Daleks, Episode 2.

Most Doctor Who episodes were made on two-inch videotape for initial broadcast and then telerecorded onto 16 mm film by BBC Enterprises for further commercial use. Enterprises used 16 mm for overseas sales as it was considerably cheaper to buy and easier to transport than videotape. It also circumvented the problem of different countries' incompatible video standards, as film was a universal medium whereas videotape was not. The BBC had no central archive at the time; the Film Library kept programmes that had been made on film, while the Engineering Department was responsible for storing videotapes. BBC Enterprises only kept copies of programmes that they deemed commercially valuable. They had little dedicated storage space, and tended to place piles of film canisters wherever they could find space for them at their Villiers House property.

The Engineering Department had no mandate to archive the programme videotapes they held, although typically they would not be wiped or junked until the relevant production department or BBC Enterprises indicated that they had no further use for the tapes. The first Doctor Who master videotapes to be wiped were those for the serial The Highlanders, which were erased on 9 March 1967, a mere two months after Episode 4's original transmission. Episode seven of The Daleks' Master Plan was cleared for wiping on 17 August 1967; it is considered the first Doctor Who episode to be permanently lost, as no telerecordings of that episode were ever made. Further erasing of Doctor Who master videotapes by the Engineering Department continued into the 1970s. Eventually, every master videotape of the programme's first 253 episodes (1963–1969) was destroyed or wiped. The final 1960s master tapes to be erased were those for the 1968 serial Fury from the Deep, in late 1974.

Despite the destruction of these masters, BBC Enterprises held an almost complete archive (with the exception of episode seven of The Daleks' Master Plan) of the series in the form of their 16 mm film telerecording copies until approximately 1972. From around 1972 to 1978, BBC Enterprises also disposed of much of their older material, including many episodes of Doctor Who. The final 1960s telerecordings to be junked were those for the 1966 serial The War Machines, in early 1978, shortly before the junking of material was halted by the intervention of fan Ian Levine.

=== The purge of the archives ===
Enterprises' episodes were usually junked because their rights agreements with the actors and writers to sell the programmes abroad had expired. With many broadcasters around the world now switching to colour transmission, it was not deemed worthwhile extending agreements to sell the older black-and-white material.

The BBC Film Library, meanwhile, had no responsibility for storing programmes that had not originated on film, and there were conflicting views between the Film Library and BBC Enterprises over which party held the responsibility for archiving programmes. As each body believed it the other's responsibility to archive the material, each thought nothing of destroying its own copies as necessary. This lack of communication contributed to the erasure of much of the Corporation's film archive of older black-and-white programming. While thousands of other programmes have been destroyed in this way around the world, the missing Doctor Who episodes are probably the best-known example of how the lack of a consistent programme archiving policy risks permanent loss.

Following the purges and subsequent recoveries, gaps in the Doctor Who archive were spread unevenly through its first 11 seasons. Major losses mostly affected First and Second Doctor serials; although three stories are missing just one episode each ("Mission to the Unknown", The Tenth Planet Episode 4, and The Web of Fear Episode 3), other stories are lost altogether. Patrick Troughton's era as the Second Doctor is particularly affected; of the 14 stories composing his first two seasons, only The Tomb of the Cybermen and The Enemy of the World are complete, and these only exist due to telerecordings later returned from Hong Kong and Nigeria, respectively.

All stories starring Jon Pertwee as the Third Doctor are complete, though many episodes no longer survive on their original videotapes and were only available from black-and-white overseas prints upon recovery; these episodes have subsequently been restored to colour using a variety of methods. In order of original transmissions, the very last Doctor Who master videotapes to be wiped were the first episodes of the 1974 serials Invasion of the Dinosaurs and Death to the Daleks. The latter was recovered from overseas, initially from a tape in the NTSC format, and later in the original PAL format on a tape returned from Dubai.

For four years, Episode 1 of Invasion of the Dinosaurs was the only Pertwee episode to be entirely missing from the archives, barring the film sequences for the episode, until a black-and-white 16 mm copy was returned to the BBC in June 1983. The story was released on DVD with a partially recolourised version of Episode 1, alongside a higher-quality monochrome transfer of the episode, in The UNIT Files box set. With the exception of the final shot of episode 3 of The Deadly Assassin (1976) and the credits of Parts One and Two of Ghost Light (1989), archival holdings from Death to the Daleks Episode 2 onwards are complete on the original broadcast videotapes.

Unrelated to the regular archive purges, the final shot of The Deadly Assassin Episode 3 (1976) has been excised from the master copy. The shot was removed after its initial UK transmission, following complaints from Mary Whitehouse of the National Viewers' and Listeners' Association. Subsequent repeats and commercial releases have restored the shot from off-air video copies. Similarly, the master tapes for Parts One and Two of Ghost Light (1989) were changed after broadcast to correct a spelling error in the credits, Katharine Schlesinger originally being misspelt as Katherine Schlesinger.

=== The end of the junkings ===
Internally, the wiping policy officially came to an end in 1978, when the means to further exploit programmes by taking advantage of the new market for home videocassette recordings started to become apparent. The prevailing view had also begun to shift toward the attitude that archive programmes should, in any case, be preserved for posterity and historical and cultural reasons.

The BBC Film Library was turned into a combined Film & Videotape Library for the preservation of both media. The Film Library at the time held only 47 episodes of 1960s Doctor Who; they had once held 53, but six episodes had either been junked or gone missing. Junkings at BBC Enterprises, however, continued until the intervention of Ian Levine, a record producer and fan of the programme. Following the transfer of episodes still held by Enterprises, there were 152 episodes of Doctor Who no longer held by the BBC, although subsequent efforts have reduced that number to 95.

Among the most sought-after lost episodes is Episode 4 of the final William Hartnell serial, The Tenth Planet, which ends with the First Doctor's regeneration into the Second. The only portion of the episode still in existence, bar a few poor-quality silent 8mm clips, is the final 27 seconds, comprising the regeneration itself and a few seconds leading up to it. The sequence had been shown in a 1973 episode of Blue Peter and was retained in that show's archive.

Even after the end of the purge, other archive issues persist. Serials from Seasons 22–26 were shown in Germany, with soundtracks dubbed into the German language; some of these episodes no longer exist in German television archives.

=== Continuing search ===
On 20 April 2006, it was announced on Blue Peter that a life-sized Dalek would be given to anyone who found and returned one of the missing episodes.

In January 2007, ITV began a campaign called "Raiders of the Lost Archive" and although the campaign was run by ITV, they were also looking to find Doctor Who episodes and other BBC shows. One episode of the Raiders of the Lost Archive show aired in January 2007 and a further two episodes in July 2009.

In December 2012, the Radio Times listings magazine announced it was launching the hunt for more Doctor Who episodes, to tie-in with the show's 50th anniversary. The Radio Times issued its own list of missing episodes. The magazine has also set up an email address specifically for Doctor Who missing episodes that the public can use to contact it if they have any information.

In June 2018, Paul Vanezis (a member of the Restoration Team who is also a missing episode hunter) said in a podcast interview that "there is absolutely no question" that some missing episodes are held by private collectors, including "one or two" by collectors that he knows. In August 2020, he described how a copy of The Daleks' Master Plan may have survived in Australia. He reiterated in March 2021 that missing Doctor Who episodes do exist out there.

In April 2020, Philip Morris repeated that the remaining missing episode of The Web of Fear was stolen, and claimed that "at least six" missing episodes are in the hands of private collectors, but they are uncertain how they would be treated if they returned the episodes to the BBC. Morris later tweeted that a blog claiming he was negotiating with these collectors was "completely false and fake".

In November 2023, film collector John Franklin repeated Vanezis' claims to The Observer, which reported that two more missing episodes had been found, both featuring the first Doctor, and one including the Daleks (hinting that it could be a missing episode of The Daleks' Master Plan), but the owners were reluctant to return them to the BBC. He recommended that the BBC implement measures to ensure that those possessing copies of missing episodes would neither have their collections confiscated nor be prosecuted for possessing BBC property, arguing that such protections would encourage more collectors to come forward with salvaged telerecordings. However, Franklin later responded to the Observer article by saying it was "a misrepresentation of the conversation between myself and the journalist, and most unhelpful".

In October 2025, Franklin, on behalf of Film is Fabulous! (FIF), a charitable trust dedicated to preserving film collections across the UK, mentioned a private collector that possessed important film materials, including a missing episode of Doctor Who. The collector agreed to have his collection catalogued and scanned, but fell ill and died shortly before it could happen. As a result, Film is Fabulous! asked the courts to have the estate executor allow the previous agreement to go through. Franklin also mentioned that "We are aware of several collectors – plural – with several episodes of Doctor Who that are missing from the archive – plural – that are in private collections and with former industry professionals. We are aware of those and we are actively discussing their whole collections." On 13 March 2026, it was announced that FIF had recovered two missing episodes, Episodes 1 and 3 of The Daleks' Master Plan, from a private collection, marking the first discovery since 2013. The restored episodes were released on 3 April 2026. According to Justin Smith of FIF: "We know that other episodes are in existence. We don't know where they are or who's got them – otherwise we'd be knocking on doors. But, yeah, I think there are more. The only question is when and where they will come to light."

=== Compared with other series ===
Compared with other BBC series broadcast in the 1960s, Doctor Who is well-represented in surviving episodes. Of the 253 episodes broadcast during the 1960s, 158 are known to have survived – mainly due to copies produced for overseas sales. For example, Seasons 1 and 2, the most widely sold abroad of the 1960s era, are missing only nine and two episodes, respectively. By contrast, the less well-sold Season 4 has no complete serials, while Season 5 has only two complete serials (The Tomb of the Cybermen and The Enemy of the World). Doctor Who's high profile and large cult following has also helped to ensure the return of episodes which, for other less well-remembered and obscure programmes, might never have occurred. One long-running 1960s series, United!, is missing completely, with no episodes preserved in the archives at all.

Of all ongoing BBC series from the 1960s, only Steptoe and Son and Maigret have a similar survival record, with all episodes from both series existing in some form. Doctor Who is also comparatively rare amongst contemporaries in that it is one of the few BBC series (along with Dad's Army and The Morecambe and Wise Show) to have all of its 1970s episodes exist as masters or telerecordings, while other series such as Z-Cars and Dixon of Dock Green are missing episodes from as late as 1975.

== Missing episodes ==
=== List of missing episodes ===
As of March 2026, there are 95 episodes unaccounted for. The missing episodes span 26 serials, including 10 full serials. Most of the gaps are from seasons 3, 4 and 5, which lack a total of 77 episodes across 21 (out of 26) serials. By contrast, seasons 1, 2, and 6 are missing just 18 episodes, across 5 (out of 26) serials. Of these missing stories, all but three – Marco Polo, "Mission to the Unknown", and The Massacre of St Bartholomew's Eve – have surviving clips. All episodes also have full surviving audio tracks.

Many of these missing serials have been officially "completed" by using animation and/or telesnap reconstruction, and then subsequently released commercially by BBC Worldwide and later BBC Studios.

While the Patrick Troughton era is missing more episodes (53 as compared to 42 for William Hartnell), there are more Hartnell stories completely missing (6 as compared to 4). Serials highlighted in red are missing all episodes. Serials highlighted in yellow are missing more than half of their episodes. All others listed are missing at least one, but at most half, of their episodes.

Doctor (missing)	Season	Missing (total)	Story	Serial	Missing / total	Episode(s) missing	Serial completion		
Doctor (missing)	Season	Missing (total)	Story	Serial	Missing / total	Episode(s) missing	Animation	Recreation	Reconstruction
First (42)	1	9 (out of 42)	004	Marco Polo	7 / 7	All			
First (42)	1	9 (out of 42)	008	The Reign of Terror	2 / 6	4–5	2013		
First (42)	2	2 (out of 39)	014	The Crusade	2 / 4	2, 4			2022
First (42)	3	26 (out of 45)	018	Galaxy 4	3 / 4	1–2, 4	2021		2021
First (42)	3	26 (out of 45)	019	"Mission to the Unknown"	1 / 1	All		2019	
First (42)	3	26 (out of 45)	020	The Myth Makers	4 / 4	All			
First (42)	3	26 (out of 45)	021	The Daleks' Master Plan	7 / 12	4, 6–9, 11–12			
First (42)	3	26 (out of 45)	022	The Massacre of St Bartholomew's Eve	4 / 4	All			
First (42)	3	26 (out of 45)	024	The Celestial Toymaker	3 / 4	1–3	2024		2024
First (42)	3	26 (out of 45)	026	The Savages	4 / 4	All	2025		2025
First (42)	4	33 (out of 43)	028	The Smugglers	4 / 4	All			
First (42)	4	33 (out of 43)	029	The Tenth Planet	1 / 4	4	2013		2000
Second (53)	4	33 (out of 43)	030	The Power of the Daleks	6 / 6	All	2016 (Note: After being released initially in 2016, the serial was re-released in 2020 with improved graphics and features.)		2005 (Note: After being released on CD-ROM in 2005 as a simple photo-only reconstruction, the serial was re-released in 2020 with improved techniques.)
Second (53)	4	33 (out of 43)	031	The Highlanders	4 / 4	All			
Second (53)	4	33 (out of 43)	032	The Underwater Menace	2 / 4	1, 4	2023		2015
Second (53)	4	33 (out of 43)	033	The Moonbase	2 / 4	1, 3	2014		
Second (53)	4	33 (out of 43)	034	The Macra Terror	4 / 4	All	2019		2019
Second (53)	4	33 (out of 43)	035	The Faceless Ones	4 / 6	2, 4–6	2020		2020
Second (53)	4	33 (out of 43)	036	The Evil of the Daleks	6 / 7	1, 3–7	2021		2021
Second (53)	5	18 (out of 40)	038	The Abominable Snowmen	5 / 6	1, 3–6	2022		2022
Second (53)	5	18 (out of 40)	039	The Ice Warriors	2 / 6	2–3	2013		
Second (53)	5	18 (out of 40)	041	The Web of Fear	1 / 6	3	2021		2013 (Note: After being released in 2013 as a simple photo-only reconstruction, the serial was re-released in 2021 with improved techniques.)
Second (53)	5	18 (out of 40)	042	Fury from the Deep	6 / 6	All	2020		2020
Second (53)	5	18 (out of 40)	043	The Wheel in Space	4 / 6	1–2, 4–5			2017
Second (53)	6	7 (out of 44)	046	The Invasion	2 / 8	1, 4	2006		
Second (53)	6	7 (out of 44)	049	The Space Pirates	5 / 6	1, 3–6			
			26 incomplete serials		95 missing episodes		53 episodes	1 episode	47 episodes

=== Orphaned episodes ===
Serials that are over 50% complete (e.g. The Reign of Terror, The Tenth Planet) have been issued as standalone releases, with the missing episodes bridged using animation, visual reconstructions, or narration to the camera. Surviving episodes which form 50% or less of a complete story – referred to as "orphaned" episodes – have been released by the BBC in compilations (e.g. Lost in Time), or as extras on releases of complete serials. A few four-episode serials of which 50% remain (e.g. The Underwater Menace, The Moonbase) have also been issued as standalone releases.

In 2023, all Doctor Who episodes in the BBC archive – with the exception of An Unearthly Child due to licensing issues – were added to the iPlayer service. Depending on the circumstances, the animated reconstructions were also added to iPlayer.

Cells highlighted in green indicate releases where the orphaned episode has been combined with animated episodes to provide a complete serial. Cells highlighted in blue indicate releases where the orphaned episode was also animated.

Doctor	Season	Story	Serial	VHS	DVD	Blu-ray	iPlayer
First	1	008	The Reign of Terror	Ep 1–3, 6: The Reign of Terror box set	Ep 1–3, 6: The Reign of Terror DVD	—N/a	Ep 1–3, 6
First	2	014	The Crusade	Ep 3: The Hartnell Years	Ep 1, 3: Lost in Time	Ep 1, 3: The Collection: Season 2	Ep 1, 3
First	2	014	The Crusade	Ep 1, 3: The Crusade box set	Ep 1, 3: Lost in Time	Ep 1, 3: The Collection: Season 2	Ep 1, 3
First	3	018	Galaxy 4	—N/a	Ep 3: The Aztecs: Special Edition DVD	Ep 3: Galaxy 4 Blu-ray	Ep 3
First	3	018	Galaxy 4	—N/a	Ep 3: Galaxy 4 DVD	Ep 3: Galaxy 4 Blu-ray	Ep 3
First	3	021	The Daleks' Master Plan	Ep 5, 10: Daleks – The Early Years	Ep 2, 5, 10: Lost in Time	—N/a	Ep 1–3, 5, 10
First	3	024	The Celestial Toymaker	Ep 4: The Hartnell Years	Ep 4: Lost in Time	Ep 4: The Celestial Toymaker Blu-ray	Ep 4
First	3	024	The Celestial Toymaker	Ep 4: The Hartnell Years	Ep 4: The Celestial Toymaker DVD	Ep 4: The Celestial Toymaker Blu-ray	Ep 4
First	4	029	The Tenth Planet	Ep 1–3: The Tenth Planet VHS	Ep 1–3: The Tenth Planet DVD	—N/a	Ep 1–3
Second	4	032	The Underwater Menace	Ep 3: The Missing Years	Ep 3: Lost in Time	Ep 2–3: The Underwater Menace Blu-ray	Ep 2–3
Second	4	032	The Underwater Menace	Ep 3: The Missing Years	Ep 2–3: The Underwater Menace DVD	Ep 2–3: The Underwater Menace Blu-ray	Ep 2–3
Second	4	033	The Moonbase	Ep 2, 4: Cybermen – The Early Years	Ep 2, 4: Lost in Time	—N/a	Ep 2, 4
Second	4	033	The Moonbase	Ep 2, 4: Cybermen – The Early Years	Ep 2, 4: The Moonbase DVD	—N/a	Ep 2, 4
Second	4	035	The Faceless Ones	Ep 1, 3: The Reign of Terror box set	Ep 1, 3: Lost in Time	Ep 1, 3: The Faceless Ones Blu-ray	Ep 1, 3
Second	4	035	The Faceless Ones	Ep 1, 3: The Reign of Terror box set	Ep 1, 3: The Faceless Ones DVD	Ep 1, 3: The Faceless Ones Blu-ray	Ep 1, 3
Second	4	036	The Evil of the Daleks	Ep 2: Daleks – The Early Years	Ep 2: Lost in Time	Ep 2: The Evil of the Daleks Blu-ray	Ep 2
Second	4	036	The Evil of the Daleks	Ep 2: Daleks – The Early Years	Ep 2: The Evil of the Daleks DVD	Ep 2: The Evil of the Daleks Blu-ray	Ep 2
Second	5	038	The Abominable Snowmen	Ep 2: The Troughton Years	Ep 2: Lost in Time	Ep 2: The Abominable Snowmen Blu-ray	Ep 2
Second	5	038	The Abominable Snowmen	Ep 2: The Troughton Years	Ep 2: The Abominable Snowmen DVD	Ep 2: The Abominable Snowmen Blu-ray	Ep 2
Second	5	039	The Ice Warriors	Ep 1, 4–6: The Ice Warriors VHS	Ep 1, 4–6: The Ice Warriors DVD	—N/a	Ep 1, 4–6
Second	5	041	The Web of Fear	Ep 1: The Reign of Terror box set	Ep 1: Lost in Time	Ep 1–2, 4–6: The Web of Fear Blu-ray	Ep 1–2, 4–6
Second	5	041	The Web of Fear	Ep 1: The Reign of Terror box set	Ep 1–2, 4–6: The Web of Fear DVD	Ep 1–2, 4–6: The Web of Fear Blu-ray	Ep 1–2, 4–6
Second	5	043	The Wheel in Space	Ep 3, 6: Cybermen – The Early Years	Ep 3, 6: Lost in Time	—N/a	Ep 3, 6
Second	6	046	The Invasion	Ep 2–3, 5–8: The Invasion VHS	Ep 2–3, 5–8: The Invasion DVD	—N/a	Ep 2–3, 5–8
Second	6	049	The Space Pirates	Ep 2: The Troughton Years	Ep 2: Lost in Time	—N/a	Ep 2

=== Unaired missing episodes ===
In addition to the official list of missing episodes, also missing is the first recording of Episode 1 of The Daleks. At some point after the recording, it was discovered that a technical problem had caused backstage voices to be heard on the resulting videotape; in early December 1963, the episode was remounted with a different costume for Susan. This first version of the episode was never retained, except for one small portion of it which was used as part of the reprise at the beginning of Episode 2.

Planet of Giants is another unusual example. It was originally recorded as four episodes, with Episodes 1–3 directed by Mervyn Pinfield, and Episode 4 by Douglas Camfield. To create a faster-paced climax, Episodes 3 and 4 were combined and reduced to form a single episode, with Camfield credited as director. This decision, made by then-Head of Drama Sydney Newman, resulted in a gap at the end of the second production block, which led to the creation of "Mission to the Unknown".

While the master videotapes for Episodes 1 to 3 of Planet of Giants were wiped in January 1969, the fate of Episode 4's original studio recording tape is not known, though it is generally believed that all material not used in the combined final episode was junked. The serial's 2012 DVD release features a reconstruction of the original episodes, directed by Ian Levine. The production rebuilds the deleted scenes using CGI, footage from elsewhere in the serial, and re-recorded dialogue from Carole Ann Ford, William Russell, and actors impersonating the rest of the cast.

Doctor	Season	Story	Serial	Lost Episodes	Details
First	1	002	The Daleks	1	Episode remounted. The reprise at the beginning of Episode 2 contains footage from the original version, which is otherwise missing.
First	2	009	Planet of Giants	3, 4	Edited together into a single episode before the original broadcast, airing as Episode 3. There is no official 4th episode for this serial. The unaired versions are missing.

== Recovery ==
=== Episodes ===
When the BBC's complete holdings (both the BBC Film & Videotape Library and the BBC Enterprises) were first audited in 1978, the following episodes were absent from their collective archives, but have subsequently been returned to the Corporation through various methods. The 16 stories highlighted have all episodes existing as a result. Except where indicated, all episodes were returned as 16 mm telerecording negatives or prints.

Note: Except for Invasion of the Dinosaurs and Death to the Daleks, all Third Doctor episodes already have 16 mm telerecordings existing in the BBC archives.

Doctor	Season	Story no.	Serial	Total Eps	In archive	# Returned (Eps No.)	Recovered from		
Doctor	Season	Story no.	Serial	Total Eps	In archive	# Returned (Eps No.)	Source	Country/Territory	Year
First	1	008	The Reign of Terror	6	4	4 (1–3, 6)	CyBC (ep. 1–3) (Note: A redundant copy of Episode 6 was found as part of this cache. Copies of episodes 4 and 5 were also held by the CyBC, but were destroyed during the Turkish invasion of Cyprus in 1974. An additional copy of Episode 3 was later returned to the BBC in 1985.)	Cyprus	1984
First	1	008	The Reign of Terror	6	4	4 (1–3, 6)	Private collector (ep. 6)	United Kingdom	1982
First	2	014	The Crusade	4	2	1 (1)	Private collector	New Zealand	1999
First	2	017	The Time Meddler	4	4	3 (1, 3–4)	NTV (Note: An edited, redundant copy of Episode 2 was found as part of this cache. Unedited copies of Episodes 1 and 3 were later returned to the BBC in 1992.)	Nigeria	1985
First	3	018	Galaxy 4	4	1	1 (3)	Private collector	United Kingdom	2011
First	3	021	The Daleks' Master Plan	12	5	5 (1–3, 5, 10) (Note: A copy of Episode 4 was retained in the BBC Film Library, but went missing when the episode was loaned to Blue Peter in 1973.)	Private collector (ep. 1 & 3)	United Kingdom	2026
First	3	021	The Daleks' Master Plan	12	5	5 (1–3, 5, 10)	Private collector (ep. 2)	United Kingdom	2004
First	3	021	The Daleks' Master Plan	12	5	5 (1–3, 5, 10)	LDS Church (ep. 5 & 10)	United Kingdom	1983
First	3	024	The Celestial Toymaker	4	1	1 (4)	ABC	Australia	1984
First	3	027	The War Machines	4	4	4 (1–4)	NTV (ep. 1, 3, 4) (Note: An edited, redundant copy of Episode 2 was found as part of this cache. Only the copy Episode 1 was found unedited, Episodes 3 and 4 were edited.)	Nigeria	1985
First	3	027	The War Machines	4	4	4 (1–4)	Private collector (ep. 2 unedited)	Australia	1978
First Doctor totals			7 serials			19 episodes			
Second	4	032	The Underwater Menace	4	2	1 (2)	Private collector	United Kingdom	2011
Second	4	035	The Faceless Ones	6	2	1 (3)	Private collector	United Kingdom	1987
Second	4	036	The Evil of the Daleks	7	1	1 (2)	Private collector	United Kingdom	1987
Second	5	037	The Tomb of the Cybermen	4	4	4 (1–4)	ATV	Hong Kong	1992
Second	5	038	The Abominable Snowmen	6	1	1 (2)	Private collector	United Kingdom	1982
Second	5	039	The Ice Warriors	6	4	4 (1, 4–6)	BBC (Note: Recovered from a store cupboard in the BBC Enterprises building at Villiers House in Ealing)	United Kingdom	1988
Second	5	040	The Enemy of the World	6	6	5 (1–2, 4–6)	NTV (Note: A complete set of the serial was recovered, including a redundant copy of Episode 3.)	Nigeria	2013
Second	5	041	The Web of Fear	6	5	5 (1–2, 4–6) (Note: Episode 3 was originally among the discovered episodes, but went missing in the months between the discovery of the films and their return to the BBC.)	Unknown (ep. 1) (Note: There is some debate over whether this episode is a recovered one. It has been stated that it was recovered as part of a cache of material returned to the BBC from ATV in Hong Kong in 1978–1979. However, a 1976 partial listing of material then in existence at the BBC includes a copy held at BBC Enterprises (Bignell, Nothing at the End of the Lane). It is unclear if this is an error, a different copy, or if the can was misplaced at the time of the 1978 audit and subsequently rediscovered.)	Unknown	1970s
Second	5	041	The Web of Fear	6	5	5 (1–2, 4–6)	NTV (ep. 2, 4, 5, 6) (Note: A redundant copy of Episode 1 was found as part of this cache. Additionally, a copy of episode 3 was also part of this cache, but subsequently disappeared before being returned to the BBC.)	Nigeria	2013
Second	5	043	The Wheel in Space	6	2	1 (3)	Private collector	United Kingdom	1984
Second	6	047	The Krotons	4	4	1 (4)	BFI (Note: Redundant copies of Episodes 1–3 were found as part of this cache.)	United Kingdom	1978
Second	6	050	The War Games	10	10	6 (1, 3–4, 6–7, 10)	BFI (Note: Redundant copies of Episodes 2, 5 and 8–9 were found as part of this cache.)	United Kingdom	1978
Second Doctor totals			11 serials			30 episodes			
Third	7	054	Inferno	7	7	7 (1–7) (Note: Returned as 525-line NTSC master videotapes.)	CKVU	Canada	1985
Third	8	057	The Claws of Axos	4	4	2 (2–3)	TV Ontario (Note: Redundant copies of Episodes 1 and 4 were found as part of this cache.)	Canada	1982
Third	8	058	Colony in Space	6	6	6 (1–6)	CKVU	Canada	1983
Third	9	061	The Curse of Peladon	4	4	4 (1–4)	TV Ontario	Canada	1979
Third	9	062	The Sea Devils	6	6	3 (1–3)	CKVU (Note: Redundant copies of Episodes 4–6 were found as part of this cache.)	Canada	1983
Third	9	063	The Mutants	6	6	2 (1–2)	TV Ontario (Note: Redundant copies of Episodes 3–6 were found as part of this cache.)	Canada	1979
Third	9	064	The Time Monster	6	6	6 (1–6) (Note: Returned as 525-line NTSC master videotapes, Episode 6 was Initially Returned also as 525-line NTSC master videotape, a low 625-line monochrome tape of Episode Six was later discovered at the BBC in 1987.)	TV Ontario (ep. 1–5, as NTSC) (Note: A copy of Episode 6 was found as part of this cache, which became redundant following the discovery of the PAL copy.)	Canada	1983
Third	9	064	The Time Monster	6	6	6 (1–6)	BBC (ep. 6, as PAL) (Note: Found in the BBC Enterprises building at Villiers House in Ealing. The print was only in black-and-white, so it was recoloured by combining the picture with the 525-line colour signal of the episode, creating a superior copy to the NTSC one.)	United Kingdom	1987
Third	10	067	Frontier in Space	6	6	4 (1–3, 6) (Note: Returned as 625-line PAL master videotapes.)	ABC Television (Note: Redundant copies of Episodes 4 and 5 were found as part of this cache.)	Australia	1983
Third	11	071	Invasion of the Dinosaurs	6	6	1 (1)	Private collector	United Kingdom	1983
Third	11	072	Death to the Daleks	4	4	1 (1) (Note: Initially returned as a 525-line NTSC master videotape; the BBC subsequently received a 625-line PAL master videotape. Both copies were high quality 2-inch colour videotape.)	TV Ontario (as NTSC) (Note: Redundant copies of Episodes 2–4 were found as part of this cache.)	Canada	1981
Third	11	072	Death to the Daleks	4	4	1 (1)	Dubai 33 (as PAL) (Note: An edited PAL videotape copy of Episode 1, along with redundant copies of Episodes 2–4, had previously been returned to the BBC from Australia in 1985.)	United Arab Emirates	1991
Third Doctor totals			10 serials			36 episodes			
Totals			28 serials			85 episodes			

==== Sources of recovered episodes ====
In the years since the BBC archive was first audited in 1978, a number of episodes then absent have been returned from various sources.

===== BBC holdings =====
====== Film Library oddities ======
When the BBC audited its Film Library in 1977, only 47 episodes were found to exist. These Film Library copies were a random sampling of viewing prints for various episodes, along with seven of the nine episodes that had originally been telerecorded onto film for editing and/or transmission, rather than recorded to videotape. These film-originated masters were stored in the Film Library, rather than in the Engineering Department with the videotapes. The presence of the viewing prints is less easily explained.

The Film Library's remit covers material originated on film, not on videotape – yet two of the film-originated episodes of Doctor Who (The Power of the Daleks Episode 6 and The Wheel in Space Episode 5) were junked by the Film Library, while it held such unexplained material as 16 mm copies of The Tenth Planet Episodes 1–3, presumably viewing prints which were mistakenly returned to them at some point instead of BBC Enterprises. Most surprisingly of all, they also retained a 16 mm telerecording copy of the original untransmitted pilot, presumably a viewing print made in 1963 and subsequently lodged at the Library.

The Film Library also held high-quality original film sequences made for insertion into videotaped episodes. Some of these, such as those from Episodes 1 and 2 of The Daleks' Master Plan, survive to this day. Other junked sequences were mistakenly entered into a film library computer system, leading to an impression that they had existed for some years afterward, and inaccurate speculation that the BBC was still destroying clips well into the early 1980s.

====== Engineering Department ======
Following the establishment of the Film and Videotape Library, an audit of the Engineering Department found 60 of the 128 Third Doctor episodes starring Jon Pertwee, which in addition to the Film Library's copies of the film-originated Spearhead from Space, brought that Doctor's episode count up to 64 out of 128.

====== Villiers House ======
In 1978, Ian Levine located another 65 episodes from the show's first six seasons (plus 14 previously existing episodes), at the BBC Enterprises film vault at Villiers House in Ealing in west London. The episodes comprise 17 full serials, mostly from seasons 1 and 2. According to Levine, the prints of The Daleks were flagged to be junked that very day.

Levine alerted the new Film and Videotape Library's archive selector, Sue Malden, who paid her own visit to Villiers House and found every remaining Pertwee episode (albeit as a 16 mm black-and-white telerecording), except for two from his final season: Death to the Daleks and Invasion of the Dinosaurs, Episodes 1.

In August 1988, 10 years after Levine's and Malden's visits, Episodes 1 and 4–6 of the six-part Troughton story The Ice Warriors were discovered in a cupboard at Villiers House when the Corporation was in the process of moving out of the building.

====== National Film and Television Archive ======
Shortly after the junking process was halted and the BBC established its Film and Videotape Library for the purpose of storage and preservation, archive selector Sue Malden began to audit what material remained in the BBC's stores. When investigations revealed large gaps in the collection, Malden turned her inquiries to the National Film and Television Archive – which promptly returned three full Second Doctor serials – The Dominators, The Krotons, and The War Games, adding seven more episodes and completing two of those serials. These all were standard 16 mm film telerecordings with the exception of The Dominators Episode 3, which was a 35 mm print.

Episodes 4 and 5 of The Dominators originated from a foreign broadcaster, and had been slightly edited; the missing footage was restored later, through a mix of censor clips from Australia and more complete prints held by private collectors.

===== Overseas broadcasters that purchased missing episodes =====
An appeal to broadcasters in other countries who had shown the programme (notably Canada and African nations such as Nigeria) produced "lost" episodes from the archives of their television companies. The Tomb of the Cybermen, for example, was recovered in this manner from Asia Television in Hong Kong in 1992. Of the 50 episodes recovered since the original BBC audit of its holdings, 24 have been returned from overseas broadcasters:

Country	TV network(s)	1st, 2nd, and 3rd Doctor episodes purchased	Episodes recovered
South Arabia	Aden TV	53	0
Australia	ABC TV	338	5
Barbados	CBC-TV	117	0
Bermuda	ZFB-TV	26	0
Canada	CBC TV (1965), CKVU (1976–1982), and TVO (1976–1993)	99	31
Cyprus	CyBC TV	36	3
Ethiopia	ETV	77	0
West Germany	ZDF	1–6 (Note: An unknown number of episodes of The Ice Warriors were sent as audition. They were rejected due to production values.)	0
Ghana	GBC TV	26	0
Gibraltar	GTV	161	0
Hong Kong	RTV	166	4
Iran	NITV	53	0
Jamaica	JBC TV	81	0
Kenya	VOK TV	53	0
Malta	MTV	71	0
Mauritius	MBC TV	75	0
New Zealand	NZBC TV	179	1
Nigeria	RKTV	118	15
Rhodesia	RTV	53	0
Sierra Leone	SLTV	129	0
Singapore	Channel 5	318	0
Thailand	HSA-TV	53	0
Trinidad & Tobago	TTT	53	0
Uganda	UTV	75	0
United Arab Emirates	Dubai 33	48	1
Zambia	ZTV	205	0

Note that on occasion some broadcasters purchased Doctor Who telerecordings (usually 16 mm) but subsequently cancelled the order.

Nigerian television has been a particularly fruitful source for episode recovery; a total of 15 out of the 50 episodes recovered since 1978 have been reclaimed from Nigeria, leading to the completion of three full serials (The Time Meddler, The War Machines, and The Enemy of the World) and the near completion of a fourth (The Web of Fear).

====== The Time Meddler and The War Machines ======
In October 1984, Ian Levine found various episodes in the RKTV archive in Nigeria. These included former New Zealand copies of "The Watcher", "A Battle of Wits", and "Checkmate", along with a redundant copy of "The Meddling Monk" and the former New Zealand copies of Episodes 1, 3 and 4 of The War Machines, along with another copy of Episode 2 (which was already found in 1978) in the RKTV archive in Nigeria, meaning that "The Time Meddler" and "The War Machines" were finally complete.

====== The Reign of Terror ======
In October 1984, copies of "A Land of Fear", "Guests of Madame Guillotine", and "A Change of Identity", along with another copy of "Prisoners of Conciergerie" (which was already found in 1982), were found in Cyprus. They were duly returned in early 1985 and the recovery was formally announced in July of that year. Cyprus did not screen The Reign of Terror (broadcasts ended with the showing of episode 6 of The Sensorites on 25 November 1966). As a result of these episode recoveries, only two episodes (parts 4 and 5, "The Tyrant of France" and "A Bargain of Necessity") remain missing; although copies of these episodes had also been held in Cyprus, they were destroyed during the 1974 Turkish invasion of Cyprus. For the 2013 DVD release, episodes 4 and 5 were animated by Planet 55 Studios and Big Finish Productions.

====== The Celestial Toymaker ======
In 1985, during the routine examination of its film archive, the Australian Broadcasting Corporation discovered a 16 mm film print copy of "The Final Test" in Australia, but the reel had actually originated from Singapore. When the film copy was returned to the BBC, it was discovered that the 'Next Episode' caption had been removed.

====== The Tomb of the Cybermen ======
The Tomb of the Cybermen was prepared for release in early 1992 on audio cassette as part of the "Missing Stories" collection, with narration by Jon Pertwee. Then in late 1991, telerecordings of all four episodes were returned to the BBC from the Hong Kong-based Rediffusion company. In May 1992, the serial was released on VHS with a special introduction from director Morris Barry.

Between 1991 and 2013, the serial was the only complete story from Season 5 (and the only complete serial to feature Deborah Watling as Victoria Waterfield).

====== The Enemy of the World and The Web of Fear ======
Following months of rumours that around 90 missing episodes were discovered in an African archive (dubbed the "Omnirumour"), in October 2013 the BBC announced the return of 9 missing episodes from a television relay station in Jos, Nigeria. In the course of his work abroad, Philip Morris of Television International Enterprises Archives had discovered episodes 1–6 of The Enemy of the World and episodes 1–6 of The Web of Fear and returned 11 of these to the BBC. Episode 3 of The Web Of Fear was part of the find, but the episode disappeared "en route" to the UK, with Morris presuming it was sold to a private collector. The return of the nine missing episodes was the single largest recovery of Doctor Who episodes in 25 years, resulting in the second full serial from Troughton's first two seasons to exist in the BBC's archives.

Both serials were promptly released on iTunes, with DVD releases following over the next few months. On both the iTunes and the DVD release, episode 3 of The Web of Fear was represented by a tele-snap reconstruction.

In a 2025 interview, Philip Morris blamed Ian Levine for spreading the omnirumour.

===== Private collectors =====
Several episodes have been returned by private film collectors, who at some point acquired 16 mm film prints intended for sale to foreign broadcasters.

====== The Abominable Snowmen and Invasion of the Dinosaurs ======
In 1975, the Australian Broadcasting Corporation returned all six broadcast prints of The Abominable Snowmen and telerecordings of the first three episodes of Invasion of the Dinosaurs to the BBC to be disposed of.

Roger Stevens was working for the BBC as a film editor in the 1980s, and one morning, as he was travelling to work by train, he bumped into a BBC colleague and they began to talk about Doctor Who episodes. The BBC projectionist mentioned that he had nine episodes of Doctor Who that Stevens could buy for £25. In the summer of 1981, Stevens bought The Space Museum episode 1, The Abominable Snowmen episode 2, The Moonbase episode 4, Invasion of the Dinosaurs episode 1, and three episodes of Carnival of Monsters. Stevens then contacted Ian Levine to find out what was missing from the BBC archive; Levine confirmed that The Abominable Snowmen episode 2 and Invasion of the Dinosaurs episode 1 were missing.

Stevens gave these prints to Levine, who returned The Abominable Snowmen to the BBC in February 1982, although he held back Invasion of the Dinosaurs from the BBC for a while. This was later returned to the BBC by Levine in June 1983, who then made a copy and returned the original to Levine.

====== The Reign of Terror ======
In 1974, the Sierra Leone Broadcasting Corporation returned all six broadcast prints of The Reign of Terror to the BBC to be disposed of. Episode 6 was recovered by Bruce Campbell when he attended a film fair in the 1980s and began chatting to a stall holder who informed him that one of his regular customers had in their possession The Reign of Terror episode 6. Campbell got in contact with the customer, bought the missing episode for £50, and then, in May 1982, donated it to the BBC through Ian Levine. In late 1985, the same collector who had The Reign of Terror episode 6 in 1982 also gave a copy of The Reign of Terror episode 3 to Bruce Campbell, who in turn also donated it to the BBC. As copies of the first 3 episodes were returned from Cyprus (see above) around the same time, not a lot of coverage was given to the return of this print.

====== The Wheel in Space ======
In 1984 Doctor Who Magazine (issue #87) ran a story about a rumour of a missing Doctor Who episode that was in Portsmouth; this led to episode 3 of The Wheel in Space being loaned to the BBC in April 1984 by David Stead to allow for a copy to be made. It was released on VHS in 1992, with poor results. Later, the print was borrowed again, and a new high-quality copy was made, using D3 videotape. Stead recollects that he had purchased the episode for £15 from another collector.

====== The Faceless Ones and The Evil of the Daleks ======
In 1975, the Australian Broadcasting Corporation returned all thirteen broadcast prints of The Faceless Ones and The Evil of the Daleks to the BBC to be disposed of. In 1982, novice film collector Gordon Hendry purchased 16 mm copies of The Faceless Ones, episode 3, and The Evil of the Daleks, episode 2, from a film fair in Buckingham. At that time Hendry was unaware of the episodes' value (only one episode of The Faceless Ones and none of The Evil of the Daleks were known to exist).

In 1985, a cinema owner in Brighton persuaded Hendry to lend him the films, so as to screen the episodes for profit while the Panopticon VI convention was being held in the town. Saied Marham, an associate of Hendry's who was lent the films by Hendry, visited Panopticon to generate interest in the showing, only to be dismissed as a hoaxster, and the screening did not go ahead. As a result, Marham kept the films to himself. After the event, Hendry and Paul Vanezis spent 15 months attempting to retrieve the episodes from Marham.

Eventually, in 1987, after Vanezis got the episodes back from Marham, a charity fundraising convention called Tellycon aired The Faceless Ones, episode 3, in tribute to the recently deceased Patrick Troughton. In the following weeks, Vanezis and Ian Levine negotiated the return of both episodes to the BBC archive. Copies were made and the original prints were returned to Hendry.

====== The Crusade ======
Although the New Zealand Broadcasting Corporation received copies of The Crusade, it never broadcast the story due to a prohibitive rating from censors. NZBC never returned its film prints to the BBC and junked them in 1974, along with other episodes of Doctor Who. In 1998, film collector Bruce Grenville purchased a 16 mm copy of The Crusade episode 1 from a stall at a New Zealand film fair, containing various material previously rescued from a Wellington rubbish tip. Through a series of chance meetings, the episode eventually was loaned to the BBC in January 1999 where a copy was made using D3 videotape. The original print was returned to Grenville, who sold it on eBay in January 2000.

====== Galaxy 4 and The Underwater Menace ======
In 1975, the Australian Broadcasting Corporation returned all eight broadcast prints of Galaxy 4 and The Underwater Menace to the BBC for disposal. In the mid-1980s, former ITV engineer Terry Burnett purchased Australian prints of episode 3 of Galaxy 4 and episode 2 of The Underwater Menace from another collector, unaware of their value. In October 2011, after a chance encounter with Radio Times' Head of Heritage Ralph Montagu, Burnett returned the episodes to the BBC. The discoveries were announced in December.

===== Other sources =====
====== The Daleks' Master Plan ======
The Daleks' Master Plan was never sold abroad; only Australia requested viewing copies (excepting Episode 7, "The Feast of Steven"), and eventually declined to purchase the serial. This viewing copy was archived at ABC's Gore Hill studio, which was sold in 2003. The episodes may have been returned to the BBC in 1975, but according to Paul Vanezis they may also still be in Australia.

Five of the serial's 12 episodes have been recovered. In July 1983, 16 mm copies of episodes 5 and 10 were discovered in the basement of a Mormon church in London. Episode 2 was returned in 2004 by former BBC engineer Francis Watson. He had come across the film in the 1970s, while clearing a projector testing room at the BBC's Ealing Studios. Instead of disposing of the film as instructed, he brought it home – eventually to return it to the BBC when he realised its value. In March 2026, the BBC announced that Film is Fabulous! had recovered episodes 1 and 3 from a private collection. The episodes were found in a deceased collector's cardboard box with other prints in 2026. To protect the identity of the deceased private collector, the circumstances of how the episodes were acquired by the collector have been withheld from the public. Four other Hartnell-era episodes, all of which already existed in the archives, were located in the same collection. (Note: The four other episodes in question are episodes 2 and 3 of The Daleks, episode 1 of The Web Planet, and episode 1 of The Chase.)

====== The Ice Warriors ======
In August 1988, BBC Enterprises was in the process of moving out of Villiers House in Ealing. During the clearing out, an employee found several film cans pushed to the back of a storage cupboard. The cans found were labelled The Ice Warriors episodes 2, 4, 5, 6. On inspection of the prints, the can labelled Ice Warriors 2 actually contained episode 1 (the label had all the correct details for episode 1 except for the instalment number). Episodes 4, 5 & 6 were present in their respective cans, thus only leaving episodes 2 and 3 missing.

Additionally, a can labelled Fury from the Deep episode 6 was also found alongside the other cans, but the print contained a different program.

==== Incomplete recovered episodes ====
Of the 50 recovered episodes, several are missing short segments – due either to overseas censorship or to damage to the surviving film print. The following table shows all affected episodes, and the total duration of missing material.

Doctor	Story no.	Serial	Eps	Incomplete episode	Missing (mm:ss)	Reason missing
First	005	The Keys of Marinus	6	Episode 2	00:07	Film damage (Note: This was recreated for the DVD Release.)
First	005	The Keys of Marinus	6	Episode 4	00:10	Film damage
First	017	The Time Meddler	4	Episode 4	00:12	Overseas censorship (Note: This was reenacted for the Blu-Ray Release.)
First	018	Galaxy 4	4	Episode 3	00:27	Film damage
First	024	The Celestial Toymaker	4	Episode 4	00:05	Cut from film (Note: The "Next Episode" caption was cut by Singaporian censors due to the next serial, The Gunfighters, being rejected for viewing.) (Note: The "Next Episode" caption was later restored for the DVD Release.)
First	027	The War Machines	4	Episode 3	01:00	Overseas censorship (Note: This was reconstructed from partial censor clips.)
First	027	The War Machines	4	Episode 4	00:08	Overseas censorship
First Doctor totals		5 serials	7 episodes		2 minutes 9 seconds	
Second	032	The Underwater Menace	4	Episode 2	00:02	Film damage
Second	035	The Faceless Ones	6	Episode 3	00:20	Film damage
Second Doctor totals		2 serials	2 episodes		0 minutes 22 seconds	
Totals		7 serials	9 episodes		2 minutes 31 seconds	

=== Clips ===
Of the 95 missing episodes, 36 are represented by short "orphan" clips, recovered from various sources. These clips span 17 of the 26 serials affected by missing episodes, seven of which are otherwise completely missing. The only serials lacking any footage whatsoever are Marco Polo, "Mission to the Unknown", and The Massacre of St Bartholomew's Eve. The following table shows all recovered excerpts, together with pertinent episodes, format of the clips, and the source of recovery. Otherwise-missing serials are highlighted in red.

Doctor	Season	Story no.	Serial	No. Eps	Recovered from					
Doctor	Season	Story no.	Serial	No. Eps	From Ep.	Recovered (mm:ss)	Format	Source	Country/ Territory	Total (mm:ss)
First	1	008	The Reign of Terror	6	Ep. 4	00:10	8mm cine	Private individual	Australia	00:21
First	1	008	The Reign of Terror	6	Ep. 5	00:11	8mm cine	Private individual	Australia	00:21
First	3	018	Galaxy 4	4	Ep. 1	00:10	8mm cine	Private individual	Australia	06:03
First	3	018	Galaxy 4	4	Ep. 1	05:23 (Note: Longest single piece of extant footage from a missing episode)	16 mm telerecording	Private collector	United Kingdom	06:03
First	3	018	Galaxy 4	4	Ep. 1	00:30 (Note: Broadcast as part of Whose Doctor Who, 3 April 1977)	16 mm telerecording	BBC	United Kingdom	06:03
First	3	020	The Myth Makers	4	Ep. 1	00:21	8mm cine	Private individual	Australia	00:56+
First	3	020	The Myth Makers	4	Ep. 2	00:15	8mm cine	Private individual	Australia	00:56+
First	3	020	The Myth Makers	4	Ep. 3	00:05	8mm cine	Private individual	Australia	00:56+
First	3	020	The Myth Makers	4	Ep. 4	00:15	8mm cine	Private individual	Australia	00:56+
First	3	020	The Myth Makers	4	Ep. 4	00:0? (Note: Stock footage used in the episode)	35 mm film	BBC	United Kingdom	00:56+
First	3	021	The Daleks' Master Plan	12	Ep. 4	00:58 (Note: Broadcast as part of Blue Peter, 5 November 1973)	16 mm telerecording	BBC	United Kingdom	00:58
First	3	026	The Savages	4	Ep. 3	00:03	8mm cine	Private individual	Australia	00:44
First	3	026	The Savages	4	Ep. 4	00:41	8mm cine	Private individual	Australia	00:44
First	4	028	The Smugglers	4	Ep. 1	00:23	16 mm telerecording	National Archives	Australia	00:50
First	4	028	The Smugglers	4	Ep. 3	00:24	16 mm telerecording	National Archives	Australia	00:50
First	4	028	The Smugglers	4	Ep. 4	00:03	16 mm telerecording	National Archives	Australia	00:50
First	4	029	The Tenth Planet	4	Ep. 4	00:51	8mm cine	Private individual	Australia	01:18
First	4	029	The Tenth Planet	4	Ep. 4	00:27	16 mm telerecording	BBC	United Kingdom	01:18
First Doctor totals			7 serials	14 episodes		11 minutes 7+ seconds				
Second	4	030	The Power of the Daleks	6	Ep. 1	00:35	8mm cine	Private individual	Australia	02:58
Second	4	030	The Power of the Daleks	6	Ep. 1	00:19 (Note: Broadcast as part of a trailer on BBC1, 5 November 1966)	16 mm telerecording	BBC	United Kingdom	02:58
Second	4	030	The Power of the Daleks	6	Ep. 2	00:24	8mm cine	Private individual	Australia	02:58
Second	4	030	The Power of the Daleks	6	Ep. 4	00:10 (Note: Broadcast as part of Perspectives: C for Computer, 29 May 1974)	16 mm telerecording	ABC	Australia	02:58
Second	4	030	The Power of the Daleks	6	Ep. 4	00:21 (Note: Broadcast as part of Tomorrow's World, 28 December 1966)	16 mm film insert	BBC	United Kingdom	02:58
Second	4	030	The Power of the Daleks	6	Ep. 4	00:05	35 mm film	Private individual	United Kingdom	02:58
Second	4	030	The Power of the Daleks	6	Ep. 5	00:18	16 mm telerecording	ABC	Australia	02:58
Second	4	030	The Power of the Daleks	6	Ep. 5	00:40 (Note: Broadcast as part of Whicker's World, 27 January 1968)	16 mm film	BBC	United Kingdom	02:58
Second	4	030	The Power of the Daleks	6	Ep. 6	00:06 (Note: Broadcast as part of Tom Tom, 26 November 1968)	16 mm film	BBC	United Kingdom	02:58
Second	4	031	The Highlanders	4	Ep. 1	00:13	16 mm telerecording	National Archives	Australia	00:13
Second	4	032	The Underwater Menace	4	Ep. 1	00:14	16 mm telerecording	National Archives	Australia	00:17
Second	4	032	The Underwater Menace	4	Ep. 4	00:03	16 mm telerecording	National Archives	Australia	00:17
Second	4	034	The Macra Terror	4	Ep. 2	00:26	16 mm telerecording	National Archives	Australia	01:20
Second	4	034	The Macra Terror	4	Ep. 3	00:02	16 mm telerecording	National Archives	Australia	01:20
Second	4	034	The Macra Terror	4	Ep. 3	00:52	8mm cine	Private individual	Australia	01:20
Second	4	035	The Faceless Ones	6	Ep. 2	00:03	8mm cine	Private individual	Australia	00:23
Second	4	035	The Faceless Ones	6	Ep. 4	00:20 (Note: Stock footage used in the episode)	16 mm film	BFI	United Kingdom	00:23
Second	4	036	The Evil of the Daleks	7	Ep. 7	00:03	16 mm film	Private collector	United Kingdom	00:03
Second	5	038	The Abominable Snowmen	6	Ep. 4	00:08 (Note: Broadcast as part of Late Night Line-Up, 25 November 1967)	16 mm film	BBC	United Kingdom	00:08
Second	5	042	Fury from the Deep	6	Ep. 1	00:19 (Note: Broadcast as part of Doctor Who – The War Games, 21 June 1969)	16 mm telerecording	BBC	United Kingdom	02:15
Second	5	042	Fury from the Deep	6	Ep. 2	00:54	16 mm telerecording	National Archives	Australia	02:15
Second	5	042	Fury from the Deep	6	Ep. 4	00:31	16 mm telerecording	National Archives	Australia	02:15
Second	5	042	Fury from the Deep	6	Ep. 5	00:31	16 mm telerecording	National Archives	Australia	02:15
Second	5	043	The Wheel in Space	6	Ep. 1	00:?? (Note: Stock footage used in the episode)	35 mm film	BBC	United Kingdom	00:13+
Second	5	043	The Wheel in Space	6	Ep. 1	00:04	16 mm telerecording	BBC	United Kingdom	00:13+
Second	5	043	The Wheel in Space	6	Ep. 4	00:03	16 mm telerecording	National Archives	Australia	00:13+
Second	5	043	The Wheel in Space	6	Ep. 5	00:06	16 mm telerecording	Private collector	New Zealand	00:13+
Second	6	049	The Space Pirates	6	Ep. 1	01:05 (Note: Held by the BBC Film Library)	35 mm film insert	BBC	United Kingdom	01:05
Second Doctor totals			10 serials	22 episodes		8 minutes 55+ seconds				
Totals			17 serials	36 episodes		20 minutes 2+ seconds				

==== Excised clips ====
Bill Burridge as Mr. Quill, in a scene excised by the Australian Film Censorship Board from the missing serial Fury from the Deep

Some overseas viewing prints were physically edited for content by local censor boards before transmission, for reasons such as excessive violence, fright-inducing material, and, in some cases, the conservative personal views of the censors. Additionally, episodes might occasionally receive minor edits for timing reasons as well, in order to fill their allocated broadcast slot along with advertising. Hence, episodes recovered from these sources (Australia, New Zealand) are missing these segments.

Later discoveries turned up a large number of excised clips, held by interested parties as proof of the edits. In October 1996, Australian Doctor Who fans Damian Shanahan and Ellen Parry discovered a collection in the records of the National Archives of Australia, provided as evidence by the Commonwealth Film Censorship Board (now the Classification Board). These clips include: The War Machines, episodes 2–4; The Smugglers, episodes 1, 3–4; The Highlanders, episode 1; The Underwater Menace, episodes 1, 4; The Macra Terror, episodes 2–3; Fury From The Deep, episodes 2, 4–5; The Dominators, episodes 4–5 and The Wheel In Space, episode 4.

The clips from The Dominators, episode 4–5 precisely matched the edits to the prints already held by the BBC, suggesting that the episodes were exactly the same prints that had been censored decades before. The clips from The Underwater Menace, episode 2 were later found to precisely match the edits to the print discovered in late 2011, suggesting that the recovered episode was exactly the same print that had been censored decades before.

In an interview for the fanzine The Disused Yeti, Shanahan stated that although he and Parry had found paper records relating to the censoring of early to mid William Hartnell stories, the excised portions for all stories from An Unearthly Child to The Gunfighters had been destroyed some time before Shanahan and Parry's investigation.

In 2002, New Zealand fan Graham Howard uncovered excised clips from episodes 2, 4 & 5 of The Web of Fear and episode 5 of The Wheel in Space.

==== 8mm clips ====
A fan in Australia has returned small excerpts of off-screen footage, recorded from repeat showings using an 8mm cine film camera. The missing episodes covered include The Reign of Terror, episodes 4–5; Galaxy 4, episode 1; The Myth Makers, episodes 1–4; The Savages, episodes 3–4; The Tenth Planet, episode 4; The Power Of The Daleks, episodes 1–2; The Macra Terror, episode 3; and The Faceless Ones, episode 2.

==== From other Doctor Who episodes ====
Due to the show's habit of repeating cliffhanger footage, sometimes missing episode material can be found in surviving neighbour episodes. Episode 2 of The Daleks uses a prefilmed reprise from the original recording of Episode 1, which later had to be remounted; the original version of Episode 1 is presumed to have been destroyed.

A brief clip from Episode 4 of The Crusade exists at the very start of The Space Museum. Episode 1 of the latter serial begins with the characters in period costume, briefly frozen in place. An off-camera cough heard on both soundtracks shows that the clip was a filmed insert from the previous (and missing) episode.

In its lead-in to an upcoming repeat, The Wheel in Space episode 6 contains a short three-frame clip from The Evil of the Daleks episode 1, alongside a reprise from the existing episode 2 of that serial.

Other episodes contain straight excerpts from earlier serials, such as episode 10 of The War Games, which employs model shots from the first episodes of Fury from the Deep, The Web of Fear and The Wheel in Space.

==== From other television programmes ====
A short film sequence from The Power of the Daleks, Episode 5. It survived through a 1968 edition of Whicker's World which featured an interview with Dalek creator Terry Nation.

Clips from some missing episodes also survive due to their use in other surviving programmes. For example, excerpts from Episode 4 of The Daleks' Master Plan were used in a 1973 edition of Blue Peter, and scenes from The Power of the Daleks in an Australian programme called Perspective: C for Computer.

In 2005, two further short clips from The Power of the Daleks – along with a higher-quality version of one of the extant scenes – were discovered in a 1966 episode of the BBC science series Tomorrow's World. The clips, lasting less than 10 seconds each and on film (as opposed to film recordings), came to light when the Tomorrow's World segment was broadcast as part of the edition of 11 September 2005 of the clip-based nostalgia show Sunday Past Times on BBC Two. After being alerted to the footage, Paul Vanezis of the Doctor Who Restoration Team tracked down the uncut version of the clip.

The 1977 documentary Whose Doctor Who indirectly led to a lengthy excerpt from "Four Hundred Dawns", episode 1 of the 1965 serial Galaxy 4. The film's producers used an excerpt from a viewing print of the episode, which they further cut down in the editing. Rather than discard the unused portion, the film's advisor Jan Vincent-Rudzki asked to keep the film trims. Later in the 1990s, Vincent-Rudzki returned the clip to the archives. At a total of 5m 53s, this clip is the longest piece of surviving footage from an otherwise missing episode, accounting for a quarter of the total running time.

==== Rare behind the scenes clips ====
Apart from actual episode footage, rare behind-the-scenes material also was discovered for The Smugglers, The Evil of the Daleks, The Abominable Snowmen, and Fury from the Deep. Also from the latter serial exists some raw footage from the filming of Episode 6, featuring some alternative camera angles from what was eventually broadcast.

=== Audio soundtracks ===
Although numerous episodes are still missing, full-length audio soundtracks for all missing episodes are held by the BBC. These come from off-air recordings made by fans, often made by use of a microphone attached to a tape recorder placed close to the television set. While the quality of these off-air recordings varies greatly, multiple fan recordings exist for every episode.

In November 1991, Jon Pertwee recorded link narration for a planned spring 1992 cassette release of the then-missing serial The Tomb of the Cybermen. However, all four episodes of The Tomb of the Cybermen were found in Hong Kong in December 1991, and returned to the BBC archive in January 1992. With the serial no longer being lost, the cassette release of the soundtrack was then delayed for a year until mid-1993, and then released due to contractual obligations. In 1992, Colin Baker recorded link narration for a cassette release of The Macra Terror, while Tom Baker recorded link narration for a cassette release of The Evil of the Daleks. The two coffee bar scenes from Episode 1 of The Evil of the Daleks had to be removed due to songs by the Seekers and the Beatles playing in the background. The following year in the summer of 1993, Tom Baker did first person link narration (as the Fourth Doctor recalling earlier adventures) for the cassette releases of The Power of the Daleks and Fury from the Deep, a style which he also did when narrating the never-recorded bits on the 1992 VHS release of Shada. This first person style of link narration was in complete contrast to his previous narration on The Evil of the Daleks cassette release, which had been done in the third person as Tom Baker.

Beginning in 1999, the BBC started releasing all the serials with missing episodes on CD audiobook, with linking narration provided by former actors on the serials, such as William Russell, Peter Purves, Frazer Hines, Anneke Wills, Wendy Padbury and Carole Ann Ford, although Colin Baker's 1992 cassette link narration was reused for the 2000 CD release of The Macra Terror, which left much more to the listener's imagination compared to all other CD releases of Doctor Who TV soundtrack audiobooks from 1999 to 2012. In 2012, The Macra Terror was re-released as part of the Collections 4 boxset, and included new more detailed linking narration by Anneke Wills. By February 2006, the soundtracks for all of the then 108 missing episodes had been released, albeit with a copyright-uncleared music replacement of Paperback Writer by the Beatles with Hold Tight by Dave Dee, Dozy, Beaky, Mick & Tich in the second coffee bar scene during Episode 1 of The Evil of the Daleks. On the CDs, there are also some slight pauses and slightly rejigged sequences for reasons of clarity, and with overdubbed linking narration.

From 2006 to 2009, BBC Audiobooks released many wholly existing stories on CD audiobook, such as The Tomb of the Cybermen and The Ark. These releases ceased in 2009 with The Ambassadors of Death due to declining sales, before four serials from Tom Baker's era were released in late 2012 under BBC Audiobooks' successor, AudioGo. After the release of the City of Death audiobook in December 2012, there was a gap of over seven years before the next audiobook release of a TV soundtrack story, with The Web Planet in 2020.

Between 2010 and 2013, BBC Audiobooks collected the individual narrated soundtracks in a series of five CD box sets, entitled "Doctor Who: The Lost TV Episodes". (Note: Attributed to multiple references:) For the sets, some serials (such as The Evil of the Daleks) were re-released with improved audio restoration. In addition to the soundtracks, the sets include special features such as the Archive on 4 documentary, "Doctor Who – The Lost Episodes" and high-quality scans of the original camera/rehearsal scripts in PDF format.

== Restoration ==
For the first 11 seasons of Doctor Who, often the surviving materials are in a very different format or condition from their original broadcast masters. Surviving 1960s material is recorded on film stock of varying quality, while early 1970s material is available in a patchwork of professional and consumer formats. To present the material in a form approximating its original broadcast masters requires extensive technical work, and a certain amount of invention.

=== Motion restoration ===
In its original form, the videotape used to record Doctor Who captures images at 50 interlaced fields per second, resulting in a smooth, "live" feel to motion. To transfer the episodes to film, the film camera is timed to combine two video fields in each frame, converting 50 fields to 25 frames per second; on playback, the omission of in-between images results in a choppier "film" style motion. To recreate the original "live" video feel, early telerecorded episodes are processed through a digital tool known as VidFIRE, which approximates the missing motion between film frames.

In addition to the telerecorded material, some early 1970s material survives only, or in colour only, on NTSC videotapes produced for North American transmission (e.g., TV Ontario and CKVU in Vancouver). NTSC runs at a different frame rate from PAL video, and has a different number of scan lines. The conversion process used in the 1970s was primitive by modern standards, resulting in a noticeable amount of picture and motion loss. Some of them survive only in off-air consumer recordings of the NTSC videotapes, thus at a second generation removed from the original PAL.

Converting the NTSC tapes back to PAL (Double Conversion) introduces more artefacts, creating a blurry picture and juddering motion. To rectify the problem, in 2005 a new Reverse Standards Conversion process, which attempts to unpick the original video conversion, was introduced for the DVD release of The Claws of Axos.

Season	Story	Serial	Total episodes	NTSC episodes	Episode source
7	054	Inferno	7	1–7	CKVU (Vancouver)
8	057	The Claws of Axos	4	2–3	TV Ontario (TVO)
8	058	Colony in Space	6	1–6	CKVU (Vancouver)
9	061	The Curse of Peladon	4	1–4	TV Ontario (TVO)
9	062	The Sea Devils	6	1–3	CKVU (Vancouver)
9	063	The Mutants	6	1–2	TV Ontario (TVO)
9	064	The Time Monster	6	1–6 (Note: All six episodes of The Time Monster were originally going to be RSC'd, however a low 625-line monochrome tape of episode 6 was discovered at the BBC in 1987, so it was recoloured by combining the black-and-white picture with the 525-line colour signal of the episode.)	TV Ontario (TVO)

=== Colour restoration ===
Several early 1970s colour serials, starring Jon Pertwee, were retained only as black-and-white film prints. In addition to the motion issue shared by all telerecorded episodes, for years the loss of colour presented a major challenge for restoration.

Season	Story	Serial	Total episodes	B&W episodes	Colour source
7	052	Doctor Who and the Silurians	7	1–7	Chroma dot colour recovery & off-air colour NTSC
7	053	The Ambassadors of Death	7	2–7	Chroma dot colour recovery & off-air colour NTSC
8	055	Terror of the Autons	4	1–4	Off-air colour NTSC
8	056	The Mind of Evil	6	1–6	Chroma dot colour recovery & Manual colourisation
8	059	The Dæmons	5	1–3, 5	Off-air colour NTSC
9	064	The Time Monster	6	1–6 (Note: All six episodes of The Time Monster were originally going to be RSC'd, however a low 625-line monochrome tape of episode 6 was discovered at the BBC in 1987, so it was recoloured by combining the black-and-white picture with the 525-line colour signal of the episode.)	525-line colour NTSC
10	068	Planet of the Daleks	6	3	Chroma dot colour recovery & Manual colourisation
11	071	Invasion of the Dinosaurs	6	1	Chroma dot colour recovery & Manual colourisation

Some of the telerecorded Pertwee episodes also survive on NTSC colour Betamax videotapes, recorded over-air on consumer hardware. In the early 1990s, an early form of the Doctor Who Restoration Team attempted to pair the low-resolution colour signal from these sources with the high-resolution black-and-white signal from the black-and-white film recordings. In this way, several Jon Pertwee stories were returned to a rough form of colour: Doctor Who and the Silurians, Terror of the Autons, and The Dæmons. Off-air NTSC colour tapes were also recovered for all of The Ambassadors of Death, but were considered of too poor a quality to permit more than a partial restoration. Off-air NTSC colour tapes of The Mind of Evil were unfortunately recorded over before its value was realised, and only a small portion of Episode 6 remained in colour.

==== Colour recovery ====
In 2007, BBC archive specialist James Insell established the Colour Recovery Working Group, an online project to find new ways of restoring black-and-white telerecordings to colour. In 2008, Reverse Standards Conversion inventor Richard Russell developed a technique involving the use of chroma dots embedded in the black-and-white signal to recreate the missing colour. This technique was initially used as part of the recolouring process on episode 3 of Planet of the Daleks; the chroma dot process was used alongside a computer-based colourisation process to match together the differing qualities of colour recovery. The process was then used on an entire episode of Dad's Army, showing that it was possible to use it on entire recordings.

Subsequently, chroma dots were used to restore the colour to Episodes 2–4, 6, and 7 of The Ambassadors of Death and episodes 2–6 of The Mind of Evil. Episode 1 of Invasion of the Dinosaurs presented a unique challenge, in that the chroma dots only contained red and green colour filter information, requiring that the blue filter to be added manually. Given the rough result, the DVD includes the black-and-white version as the default viewing option, with the reconstructed colour version as an extra.

Episode 1 of The Mind of Evil contains no colour information. In principle, BBC engineers were supposed to filter out the chroma dots upon telerecording, to create a cleaner picture. In most cases they failed to do so properly, allowing the colour recovery process to work. For this one episode, the filter had been correctly applied – so there was no colour to recover. To complete the serial for DVD, the episode was manually colourised by Stuart Humphryes and Peter Crocker – thereby returning the final Pertwee episode to a colour presentation.

== Reconstruction ==
=== Tele-snap reconstructions ===
An example of a Loose Cannon reconstruction from The Invasion, with rolling subtitles to indicate action not obvious from the audio track.

In addition to short video clips and audio soundtracks, for many episodes off-screen photographs − known as "tele-snaps" − exist, taken by photographer John Cura. From the 1940s to the 1960s, Cura was hired by various interested parties to document the transmission of many television programmes, including Doctor Who. Typically the photographs were used for promotion, or as keepsakes for cast and crew in the days before home video recorders. In many cases, they form the only remaining visual record of missing television programmes.

Since the late 1990s, fan groups such as Loose Cannon Productions have reconstructed the missing episodes, using original camera scripts to match Cura's tele-snaps and other visual material to the surviving audio tracks. Although technically infringing copyright, these "recons" have generally been tolerated by the BBC, provided that they are not sold for profit.

Official high-quality recons have also been used on commercial releases, including cut-down reconstructions – The Ice Warriors VHS (a 12-minute "highlights" reconstruction bridging the missing Episodes 2 and 3); and Marco Polo (a 30-minute reconstruction on The Beginning DVD box set) – and full-length presentations, including The Tenth Planet VHS (containing a full reconstruction of the missing Episode 4); Galaxy 4 (a reconstruction of the three missing episodes to accompany the recently recovered episode 3, "Air Lock", presented on The Aztecs Special Edition DVD); and The Web of Fear digital and DVD releases (containing a reconstruction of Episode 3, alongside the rest of the newly rediscovered serial).

Doctor	Season	Story	Serial	Total episodes	Reconstructed	Cut down	Editor	Released	Release format(s)
First	1	004	Marco Polo	7	7	Yes	Derek Handley	2006	DVD
First	2	018	The Crusade	4	2 (2, 4)	No	Derek Handley	2022	Blu-ray
First	3	018	Galaxy 4 (Note: Released on The Aztecs special edition DVD)	4	3 (1–2, 4)	Yes	Derek Handley	2013	DVD
First	3	018	Galaxy 4	4	3 (1–2, 4)	No	Derek Handley	2021	DVD, Blu-ray
First	3	018	The Celestial Toymaker	4	3 (1–3)	No	Derek Handley	2024	DVD, Blu-ray
First	3	026	The Savages	4	4	No	TBA	2025	DVD, Blu-ray
First	4	029	The Tenth Planet	4	1 (4)	No	Ralph Montagu	2000	VHS, DVD
Second	4	030	The Power of the Daleks	6	6	No	James Goss	2005	MP3 CD (Note: When played on a home PC, this disc contained the same audio content as the previous audio CD release, synchronised with a Macromedia Flash slideshow of tele-snaps and publicity photographs. For technical reasons, the surviving clips could not be included.)
Second	4	030	The Power of the Daleks	6	6	No	Derek Handley	2020	DVD, Blu-ray
Second	4	032	The Underwater Menace	4	2 (1, 4)	No	John Kelly	2015	DVD
Second	4	032	The Underwater Menace	4	2 (1, 4)	No	John Kelly	2023	DVD, Blu-ray
Second	4	034	The Macra Terror	4	4	No	Derek Handley	2019	DVD, Blu-ray
Second	4	035	The Faceless Ones	6	4 (2, 4–6)	No	Derek Handley	2020	DVD, Blu-ray
Second	4	036	The Evil of the Daleks	7	6 (1, 3–7)	No	Derek Handley	2021	DVD, Blu-ray
Second	5	038	The Abominable Snowmen	6	5 (1, 3–6)	No	Derek Handley	2022	DVD, Blu-ray
Second	5	039	The Ice Warriors	6	2 (2–3)	Yes	Ralph Montagu	1998	VHS, DVD
Second	5	041	The Web of Fear	6	1 (3)	No	John Kelly	2013	Digital, DVD
Second	5	041	The Web of Fear	6	1 (3)	No	Derek Handley	2021	DVD, Blu-ray
Second	5	042	Fury from the Deep	6	6	No	Derek Handley	2020	DVD, Blu-ray
Second	5	043	The Wheel in Space	6	4 (1–2, 4–5)	No	John Kelly	2017	Streaming

=== Animated episodes ===
In several cases, producers of the Doctor Who DVD range have commissioned original animation, synced to the programme's original audio tracks. Early commissions served to "complete" serials with only one or two missing episodes, allowing the full serials to be sold as a commercial product. Later, BBC Worldwide and BBC America commissioned a full animation of The Power of the Daleks for broadcast and commercial release.

Doctor	Season	Story	Serial	No. episodes in serial	No. of animated episodes	Animator	DVD release		
Doctor	Season	Story	Serial	No. episodes in serial	No. of animated episodes	Animator	Region 2	Region 1	Region 4
First	1	008	The Reign of Terror	6 (4 and 5 missing)	2 (4 and 5)	Planet 55 (with Big Finish)	28 January 2013	12 February 2013	6 February 2013
First	3	018	Galaxy 4	4 (1, 2 and 4 missing)	4 (all) (Note: (even though episode 3 survives))	Big Finish Creative	15 November 2021	5 April 2022	12 January 2022
First	3	024	The Celestial Toymaker	4 (1, 2 and 3 missing)	4 (all) (Note: (even though episode 4 survives))	Big Finish Creative/Shapeshifter Studios	10 June 2024	11 June 2024	TBA
First	3	026	The Savages	4 (all missing)	4 (all)	BBC Studios	24 March 2025	20 May 2025	TBA
First	4	029	The Tenth Planet	4 (4 missing)	1 (4)	Planet 55	14 October 2013	19 November 2013	30 October 2013
Second	4	030	The Power of the Daleks	6 (all missing)	6 (all)	BBC Studios	21 November 2016	24 January 2017	14 December 2016
Second	4	032	The Underwater Menace	4 (1 and 4 missing)	4 (all) (Note: (even though episodes 2 & 3 survive))	BBC Studios	13 November 2023	9 January 2024	TBA
Second	4	033	The Moonbase	4 (1 and 3 missing)	2 (1 and 3)	Planet 55	20 January 2014	22 January 2014	11 February 2014
Second	4	034	The Macra Terror	4 (all missing)	4 (all)	Sun & Moon Studios (with BBC Studios)	25 March 2019	12 November 2019	17 April 2019
Second	4	035	The Faceless Ones	6 (2, 4, 5, 6 missing)	6 (all) (Note: (even though episodes 1 & 3 survive))	BBC Studios	16 March 2020	20 October 2020	8 April 2020
Second	4	036	The Evil of the Daleks	7 (1, 3, 4, 5, 6, 7 missing)	7 (all) (Note: (even though episode 2 survives))	BBC Studios	27 September 2021	16 November 2021	10 November 2021
Second	5	038	The Abominable Snowmen	6 (1, 3, 4, 5, 6 missing)	6 (all) (Note: (even though episode 2 survives))	BBC Studios/Big Finish Creative	5 September 2022	6 December 2022	2 November 2022
Second	5	039	The Ice Warriors	6 (2 and 3 missing)	2 (2 and 3)	Qurios Entertainment	26 August 2013	17 September 2013	28 August 2013
Second	5	041	The Web of Fear	6 (3 missing)	1 (3)	Big Finish Creative/Shapeshifter Studios	16 August 2021	1 February 2022	22 September 2021
Second	5	042	Fury from the Deep	6 (all missing)	6 (all)	Big Finish Creative	14 September 2020	16 March 2021	11 November 2020
Second	6	046	The Invasion	8 (1 and 4 missing)	2 (1 and 4)	Cosgrove Hall Films	6 November 2006	6 March 2007	3 January 2007

Screenshot from the animated Episode 1 of The Invasion

The first such effort, Cosgrove Hall's animation of The Invasion episodes 1 and 4, was released to DVD alongside the surviving episodes in November 2006. Despite the DVD's success, the sales were not high enough to offset the animation cost for any future collaboration. Eventually other animation studios were commissioned to continue the reconstruction. In June 2011, 2 Entertain announced that the missing episodes 4 and 5 of The Reign of Terror would be animated by Planet 55 Studios, using the "Thetamation" process. The serial was released on DVD in January 2013. Planet 55 would later go on to animate Episode 4 of The Tenth Planet (November 2013), and episodes 1 and 3 of The Moonbase (January 2014).

In August 2013, BBC Worldwide announced that episodes 2 and 3 of The Ice Warriors would be animated by Qurios Entertainment for a DVD release later that month.

In December 2013, 2 Entertain commissioning editor Dan Hall mentioned that Planet 55 had again been commissioned to complete The Underwater Menace, for what he hoped would be an early 2014 release. However, in September 2015 Doctor Who Magazine confirmed that the much-delayed DVD, now scheduled for 26 October, was instead to contain tele-snap reconstructions of the missing episodes 1 and 4.

In September 2016 it was announced that the completely missing serial The Power of the Daleks would be animated and released via the BBC Store on 5 November 2016, the 50th anniversary of the serial's first broadcast, before it was released on DVD (21 November) and Blu-ray (6 February 2017). This was the first wholly missing serial to be completely reconstructed using animation.

==== Unreleased and unofficial animations ====
In 2008, after future collaboration with Cosgrove Hall had been rejected due to expense, 2 Entertain was approached by David Busch of US animation studio Titmouse, Inc., who offered to do the work more cheaply as a result of the favourable exchange rate between the UK and the US, and put together a test trailer of scenes animated from various missing serials, including The Power of the Daleks, The Moonbase, The Macra Terror, The Web of Fear, and Fury from the Deep. While 2 Entertain decided not to commission anything from Titmouse, the trailer was eventually seen by Ian Levine, who offered to try and raise the money for a full episode reconstruction to serve as a prototype. The episode chosen was "Mission to the Unknown", as it was a self-contained episode featuring the Daleks with a limited number of characters and sets, thus keeping the budget down. Although completed, the animated version of "Mission to the Unknown" has never been officially released, although it has been posted on various video streaming sites.

Some fans have published unofficial versions of missing episodes. Equipped with home computers and specialist programs, they've created their own animations and shared clips online.

=== Unofficial AI recreations ===
In 2025, Ian Levine completed a project to recreate the then 97 missing episodes using artificial intelligence. Levine used audio from the off-air recordings, and images from the tele-snaps and other production photographs for visual reference. He told the New York Post that he spent £70,000 of his own money on the project, and other fans contributed £30,000. The project was not authorised by the BBC, and the recreated episodes are not publicly available.

=== The Lost TV Episodes ===
From 2010 to 2012, five audio box sets were released by BBC Audiobooks. The sets collected the full, unaltered soundtracks to the Doctor Who stories which did not exist in video form up to that point. These episodes included linking narration, and all of the five sets contained exclusive interviews with former cast members. The first collection was released on 5 August 2010 and the fifth was released on 1 August 2012. BBC Audiobooks—which later became AudioGo—went into administration in 2013 and ceased production officially in 2014.

Collection One: 1964–1965
- Marco Polo
- The Reign of Terror
- The Crusade
- Galaxy 4
- The Myth Makers

Collection Two: 1965–1966

- "Mission to the Unknown"
- The Daleks' Master Plan
- The Massacre of St Bartholomew's Eve
- The Celestial Toymaker
- The Savages

Collection Three: 1966–1967

- The Smugglers
- The Tenth Planet
- The Power of the Daleks
- The Highlanders
- The Underwater Menace
- The Moonbase

Collection Four: 1967

- The Macra Terror
- The Faceless Ones
- The Evil of the Daleks
- The Abominable Snowmen
- The Ice Warriors

Collection Five: 1967–1969

- The Enemy of the World
- The Web of Fear
- Fury from the Deep
- The Wheel in Space
- The Invasion
- The Space Pirates

=== Narrated links ===
In some cases missing episodes are bridged by narration to the camera – often by a surviving actor from the serial, occasionally in-character. For their VHS releases, The Reign of Terror and The Crusade were presented by actors Carole Ann Ford and William Russell – while Episodes 1 and 4 of The Invasion were bridged by Nicholas Courtney.

Doctor	Season	Story	Serial	Total episodes	Bridged episodes	Narrator	Released	Format
First	1	008	The Reign of Terror	6	2 (4, 5)	Carole Ann Ford	2003	VHS
First	2	014	The Crusade (Note: Released as part of The Hartnell Years)	4	3 (1–2, 4)	Sylvester McCoy	1991	VHS, Blu-ray
First	2	014	The Crusade	4	2 (2, 4)	William Russell	1999	VHS, DVD, Blu-ray
First	3	021	The Daleks' Master Plan (Note: Released as part of Daleks – The Early Years)	12	10 (1–4, 6–9, 11–12)	Peter Davison	1992	VHS, DVD, Blu-ray
First	3	024	The Celestial Toymaker	4	3 (1–3)	Sylvester McCoy	1991	VHS, DVD, Blu-ray
Second	4	032	The Underwater Menace (Note: Released as part of The Missing Years)	4	3 (1–2, 4)	Frazer Hines	1998	VHS, DVD, Blu-ray
Second	4	033	The Moonbase (Note: Released as part of Cybermen – The Early Years)	4	2 (1, 3)	Colin Baker	1992	VHS
Second	4	036	The Evil of the Daleks	7	6 (1, 3–7)	Peter Davison	1992	VHS, DVD, Blu-ray
Second	5	038	The Abominable Snowmen (Note: Released as part of The Troughton Years)	6	5 (1, 3–6)	Jon Pertwee	1991	VHS
Second	5	040	The Enemy of the World	6	5 (1–2, 4–6)	Jon Pertwee	1991	VHS, DVD
Second	5	043	The Wheel in Space	6	4 (1–2, 4–5)	Colin Baker	1992	VHS
Second	6	046	The Invasion	8	2 (1, 4)	Nicholas Courtney	1993	VHS, DVD
Second	6	049	The Space Pirates	6	5 (1, 3–6)	Jon Pertwee	1991	VHS

=== Recreations ===
In 2012, a reimagined version of The Power of the Daleks, written by, directed by, and starring Nick Scovell, was released on YouTube in three parts before it was shown complete at the Power:Reimagined convention in September 2012.

In addition, the BBC has invested in the reconstruction of episodes using animation and the recreation of parts of various serials, including the completely missing Marco Polo, in the docudrama An Adventure in Space and Time produced for the 50th anniversary in 2013.

In 2019, the BBC released a recreation of "Mission to the Unknown", which was produced by a team of students, graduates and staff of the University of Central Lancashire.

== Further research ==
=== Books and periodicals ===
Between 1973 and 1994, each missing Doctor Who serial was novelised and published by Target Books.

Richard Molesworth's Wiped! Doctor Who's Missing Episodes (Telos Publishing, 2010) explores in detail the paper trail and recovery efforts surrounding the hunt for missing episodes. A revised edition was published in March 2013.

==== Nothing at the End of the Lane ====
- Issue #1 of "Nothing at the End of the Lane" (July 1999) includes articles about fan-made reconstructions of the missing episodes, audio of missing episodes, and the archive status of footage from Seasons 1–3.
- Issue #2 (June 2005) includes articles about John Cura (the photographer behind Doctor Who's tele-snaps), recent discoveries of missing episodes, Junking of videotapes in the 1960s and '70s, a look at telerecordings, and the archive status of footage from Seasons 4–6.
- Issue #3 (January 2012) includes articles about the 26 off-screen photographs taken by Chris Thompson (Production Designer) from The Evil of the Daleks episode one, and new location photographs.

==== Doctor Who Magazine ====
- Issue #444 of Doctor Who Magazine (February 2012), titled "How the Daleks Exterminated Doctor Who's History", examines the overseas sales of the missing episodes and the chances of their survival.
- Issue #466 (October 2013) focuses on the rediscovery of "The Enemy of the World" and "The Web of Fear" by Philip Morris.
- Three special editions of Doctor Who Magazine (#34–36), titled "The Missing Episodes – The First Doctor", "The Missing Episodes – The Second Doctor Volume 1", and "The Missing Episodes – The Second Doctor Volume 2", were released between March–December 2013; each issue features a 100+ page guide to the missing episodes which exist in tele-snap form, with details of how they came to be wiped.

=== Documentaries ===
- Doctor Who – Missing in Action (1993) – a documentary about the missing episodes, featuring Ian Levine.
- The Missing Years (1998) – a documentary about the lost Doctor Who episodes and recovery attempts, available on Doctor Who: The Missing Years VHS and (in an updated form) on the Lost In Time DVD box set.
- The National Lottery: Amazing Luck Stories (1999) – a short segment about the recovery of a Doctor Who episode from New Zealand.
- Time Shift – Missing Believed Wiped (2003) – a general documentary about archive television, featuring some clips and discussions about Doctor Who.
- WOTAN Assembly (2008) – a short DVD featurette about restoring The War Machines, which shows how the Doctor Who Restoration Team manages to create a near-complete version of this serial using clips from various sources around the world. Narrated by Anneke Wills.
- Colour Silurian Overlay (2008) – a DVD featurette about restoring Doctor Who and the Silurians, using the surviving 16 mm telerecordings and an off-air NTSC Betamax recording as a colour source.
- Multi-Colourisation (2009) – a DVD featurette about how chroma dots were used to restore Planet of the Daleks episode three back to full colour.
- Doctor Who – The Lost Episodes (2009) – a 60-minute BBC Radio 4 audio documentary explaining what happened to the 108 missing episodes that aired in the 1960s. Interview with Graham Strong who made audio recordings of all the classic episodes.
- The One Show (2013) – the edition of 11 October of the show featured a short documentary about how Doctor Who episodes became lost, the recovery of audio from episodes, and the finding of episodes from The Enemy of the World and The Web of Fear.
- Restoring Doctor Who (2014) – a four-minute documentary by Paul Vanezis of the Doctor Who Restoration Team, which shows the process of cleaning and restoring the nine episodes recovered in 2013.
- Preserving Doctor Who Episodes (2026) – a ten-minute documentary by Christopher Ball of Film is Fabulous!, which shows the process of cleaning and restoring the two episodes of The Daleks' Master Plan that were recovered in 2026.

== See also ==
- List of Doctor Who audio releases
- List of Doctor Who DVD releases
- List of Doctor Who Blu-ray releases
- List of Doctor Who serials
- List of unmade Doctor Who serials and films
