= The Macra Terror =

034 – The Macra Terror
- Doctor Who serial
- The original Controller is revealed as a Macra attacks him in the cliffhanger to the second episode.

Cast
- Doctor: Patrick Troughton – Second Doctor
- Companions: Anneke Wills – Polly; Michael Craze – Ben Jackson; Frazer Hines – Jamie McCrimmon
- Others: Peter Jeffrey – Pilot; Graham Armitage – Barney; Ian Fairbairn – Questa; Jane Enshawe – Sunaa; Sandra Bryant & Karol Keyes – Chicki; Maureen Lane – Drum Majorette; Terence Lodge – Medok; Gertan Klauber – Ola; Graham Leaman – Controller; Anthony Gardner – Alvis; Denis Goacher – Control Voice; Richard Beale – Broadcast/Propaganda Voice; Robert Jewell – Macra Operator; John Harvey – Officia; John Caesar, Steve Emerson & Danny Rae – Guards; Ralph Carrigan, Roger Jerome & Terry Wright – Cheerleaders

Production
- Directed by: John Davies
- Written by: Ian Stuart Black
- Script editor: Gerry Davis
- Produced by: Innes Lloyd
- Music by: Dudley Simpson
- Production code: JJ
- Series: Season 4
- Running time: 4 episodes, 25 minutes each
- Episode(s) missing: All episodes
- First broadcast: 11 March 1967
- Last broadcast: 1 April 1967

Chronology
← Preceded by The Moonbase	Followed by → The Faceless Ones

The Macra Terror is the completely missing seventh serial of the fourth season of the British science fiction television series Doctor Who, which was first broadcast in four weekly parts from 11 March to 1 April 1967.

In this serial, the Second Doctor (Patrick Troughton), Ben (Michael Craze), Polly (Anneke Wills) and Jamie (Frazer Hines) attempt to unravel a mystery within a human colony on an unnamed planet in the future, which leads to them becoming prisoners as opposed to guests. It also introduces the alien race known as the Macra, who reappear in "Gridlock" (2007). Although audio recordings, still photographs, and clips of the story exist, no episodes of this serial are known to have survived.

In March 2019, BBC Studios released an animated version of the serial using its surviving audio. It became the seventh incomplete Doctor Who serial to receive full-length animated reconstructions of its four missing episodes.

== Plot ==
The Doctor, Ben, Polly and Jamie reach a planet colonised by Earth, concerned about seeing a claw on the TARDIS's time scanner. Upon landing, they subdue a half-crazed colonist, Medok, who is promptly arrested by Security Chief Ola. The travellers are escorted to the colony, which refines a poison gas they mine for unknown reasons. The Doctor is troubled by the colony's forced festivities, remaining unconvinced by the promises of the colony's Pilot and the mysterious Controller who appears on a monitor as a still image. Medok escapes from arrest when the Doctor visits him to learn about the creatures that he sees at night. The Doctor reencounters Medok; they find the giant crab-like Macra roaming the colony during the curfew.

The pair are captured and brought before the Pilot, but the Doctor is released. The Controller orders the Pilot to hypnotize their guests; Jamie and Polly are saved but Ben is brainwashed while the Doctor is arrested alongside Jamie when he disables the hypnosis equipment. Polly ends up encountering the Macra while running from Ben, with a momentarily freed Ben saving her and bringing her to the Pilot's office where the Doctor and Jamie are. The Controller is forced to reveal his true face by the Doctor, with the group seeing the original controller killed by the Macra. The disturbed Pilot orders the arrest of the Doctor's group, sentencing them to work in the mine; Medok is also forced there after his reconditioning failed. Jamie and Medok escape, but the latter is killed by a Macra. The Doctor sends oxygen into the mines, weakening the Macra, and enabling Jamie to escape from the Macra surrounding him.

The Doctor and Polly infiltrate the control area and find it overrun with Macra, the Doctor confirming that the Macra need the gas to survive and have brainwashed the colonists into serving them. The Doctor persuades the Pilot to accompany him. With their hold on the Pilot broken, the Macra authorize Ola to place the Doctor, the Pilot, Polly and Jamie in an area of the mine where a mixture of combustible gasses will shortly explode. Ben, who has broken his conditioning, frees them and manipulates the gas pipes, sending the combustible mixture to the control centre. The gas explodes, killing all Macra. The Doctor's group dance their way out of the colony, as the colony celebrates a holiday in their heroes' honour.

== Production ==
Working titles for this story include The Spidermen, The Insect-Men and The Macras. This story introduced the first new opening title sequence since the series began. The new sequence was created by original titles designer Bernard Lodge and engineer Ben Palmer on 9 December 1966. For the first time, the face of the lead actor, Patrick Troughton, was incorporated into the "howl-around" patterns but the titles used the original theme music until Episode 1 of The Faceless Ones.

Anneke Wills wore a short wig for the majority of this serial, after Polly receives a makeover at the Colony.

=== Missing episodes and animated adaptation ===
All episodes of The Macra Terror are missing from the BBC archives. 38 seconds worth of footage survives from episode 2, mainly focusing on when Ben and Polly are attacked by the Macra. The controller's death at the end also survives, alongside the reprise of said death in episode 3. These clips only exist because they were cut by Australian censors and never returned to the BBC. Various brief clips on 8mm cine film recorded by an unknown fan in Australia survive from episode 3, mainly focusing on the Doctor and his companions.

In February 2018, work began on an animated version of the serial, directed by Charles Norton and produced by BBC Studios. The production made use of animation facilities at Sun & Moon animation studio in Bristol. All character designs were drawn by lead artist Martin Geraghty. The bulk of the animation used Toon Boom Harmony's master controller. The animation first aired on BBC America on 26 December 2019. For production reasons, the animated version excised parts of the original story. In the original episode 1, Polly gets a pixie cut and the Doctor gets a makeover so that he will look less scruffy, which he rebels against and reverts to his original look. In order to save them the expense of additional character designs for the Doctor (one messy and one neat) and for Polly (one with longer hair, one with shorter), Sun & Moon omitted this sequence and showed Polly with a pixie cut from the beginning.

=== Cast notes ===
Peter Jeffrey later played Count Grendel in The Androids of Tara (1978). Sandra Bryant had previously played Kitty in The War Machines (1966) and John Harvey played Professor Brett in the same serial. Gertan Klauber had previously appeared in The Romans (1965) and Graham Leaman would later appear in Fury from the Deep (1968) and again in The Three Doctors (1973).

After playing the part of Chicki in the first episode, Sandra Bryant asked to be released from her contract so that she could accept another job. Karol Keyes took over the part for the final episode.

== Broadcast and reception ==
Episode	Title	Run time	Original release date	UK viewers (millions)	Archive
1	"Episode 1"^{†}	22:58	11 March 1967	8.0	Only audio, and stills exist
2	"Episode 2"^{†}	23:21	18 March 1967	7.9	Only audio, stills and fragments exist
3	"Episode 3"^{†}	23:24	25 March 1967	8.5	Only audio, stills and fragments exist
4	"Episode 4"^{†}	24:41	1 April 1967	8.4	Only audio, and stills exist

^† Episode is missing

=== Reception ===
In their nonfiction The Discontinuity Guide, Paul Cornell, Martin Day and Keith Topping summed up the story as "A flawed, but interesting examination, of a peculiarly 60s psychosis." David J Howe and Stephen James Walker gave the serial a positive review although they thought that some of the more serious aspects of the story were "somewhat undermined by the presence of the Macra themselves, which tends to take it into traditional monster mayhem territory." It was considered to be a good production with strong performances from the guest cast who were "all excellent, bringing to life some interesting and well-drawn characters."

In 2009, Mark Braxton of Radio Times gave the serial four out of five stars, describing it as a "surreptitiously creepy story" although "some scenes date it horribly". The animated recreation of The Macra Terror was reviewed by Martin Belam of The Guardian, who felt that "the new animation makes the Macra far more evil scuttling creatures, and the story works all the better for it," but that the serial was overall "not one of Troughton’s best".

A Doctor Who Magazine poll for the show's 60th anniversary in 2023, The Macra Terror was voted the twelfth best story of the Second Doctor's tenure, out of a total of 21.

== Commercial releases ==
=== In print ===
The Macra Terror
- Author: Ian Stuart Black
- Cover artist: Tony Masero
- Series: Doctor Who book: Target novelisations
- Release number: 123
- Publisher: Target Books
- Publication date: July 1987 (Hardback) 10 December 1987 (Paperback)
- ISBN: 0-491-03227-7

A novelisation of this serial, written by Ian Stuart Black, was published by Target Books in July 1987.

=== Home media ===
As with all missing episodes, off-air recordings of the soundtrack exist due to contemporary fan efforts. In 1992 these were released on audio cassette, accompanied by linking narration from the Sixth Doctor, Colin Baker. In 2000, the soundtrack was remastered and re-released on CD, again with the Baker narration. In November 2004, surviving clips were included in the Lost in Time DVD set. In 2012, the soundtrack was remastered and re-released on CD as part of the Lost TV Episodes Collection Four box set, this time with new narration by Anneke Wills.

The animated reconstruction of the serial was released by BBC Studios on TVoD, DVD and Blu-ray on 25 March 2019; all three formats contain Colour and Black and White versions, as well as a "bonus" abridged animation of The Wheel in Space: Episode 1. The DVD and Blu-ray also contain a tele-snap reconstruction, restored surviving footage and photos from the 1967 version, both the Baker and Wills narrated audio, footage of the Macra prop being built at Shawcraft Models, pre-production content from the animation and an audio commentary with the original cast. A Steelbook version of the Blu-ray contains the Tenth Doctor episode "Gridlock" on a bonus disc. The Macra Terror was animated in Toon Boom Harmony animation software.
