= The Underwater Menace =

1967 Doctor Who serial

032 – The Underwater Menace
- Doctor Who serial

Cast
- Doctor: Patrick Troughton – Second Doctor
- Companions: Anneke Wills – Polly; Michael Craze – Ben Jackson; Frazer Hines – Jamie McCrimmon
- Others: Joseph Fürst – Zaroff; Colin Jeavons – Damon; Noel Johnson – King Thous; Tom Watson – Ramo; Peter Stephens – Lolem; Gerald Taylor – Damon's Assistant; Catherine Howe – Ara; P. G. Stephens – Sean; Paul Anil – Jacko; Roma Woodnutt – Nola; Graham Ashley – Overseer; Tony Handy – Zaroff's Guard

Production
- Directed by: Julia Smith
- Written by: Geoffrey Orme
- Script editor: Gerry Davis
- Produced by: Innes Lloyd
- Music by: Dudley Simpson
- Production code: GG
- Series: Season 4
- Running time: 4 episodes, 25 minutes each
- Episode(s) missing: 2 episodes (1 and 4)
- First broadcast: 14 January 1967
- Last broadcast: 4 February 1967

Chronology
← Preceded by The Highlanders	Followed by → The Moonbase

The Underwater Menace is the half-missing fifth serial of the fourth season of the British science fiction television series Doctor Who, which was first broadcast in four weekly parts from 14 January to 4 February 1967.

In this serial, the Doctor (Patrick Troughton), Ben and Polly (Michael Craze and Anneke Wills), and their new friend Jamie McCrimmon (Frazer Hines) arrive in the underwater city of Atlantis, where an eccentric scientist called Zaroff (Joseph Fürst) plots to destroy the Earth by draining its ocean supply. This story constitutes Jamie's first journey with the Doctor as a travelling companion.

Only two of the four episodes are held in the BBC archives; two remain missing. Episode 2 is the earliest surviving episode to feature both Troughton as the Second Doctor and Hines as Jamie.

An animated reconstruction of the serial was released in November 2023 as part of the programme's 60th anniversary.

== Plot ==
The Second Doctor and his companions, Polly, Ben and Jamie, are captured when they arrive on a deserted volcanic island by the survivors of Atlantis. Their high priest, Lolem, decides to sacrifice them to the great god Amdo. The Doctor is given a meal, and realises that it must have been prepared by Professor Zaroff, a missing scientist who was presumed dead. The Doctor sends Zaroff a note and Zaroff comes to their rescue.

Polly is taken by Damon for conversion-surgery into a Fish Person, while Ben and Jamie are taken to work in a mine. The Doctor cuts off the power, which gives Polly time to escape and hide in the Temple of Amdo. Zaroff tells the Doctor that he plans to drain the sea so Atlantis could come back to the surface. The Doctor realises this will destroy Earth and escapes to find a solution and look for his companions.

Ben and Jamie, along with two shipwrecked sailors, Sean and Jacko, discover Polly's hiding place. The Doctor finds a priest named Ramo along the way and tells him Zaroff's plans. Ramo takes the Doctor to Thous, King of Atlantis, who sides with Zaroff.

The Doctor and the priest are taken to be sacrificed to Lolem at the temple of Amdo. They are saved by Ben faking the voice of the statue of Amdo and giving them a chance to escape. The Doctor kidnaps Zaroff and takes him to the temple of Amdo where Ramo and Polly are left as his guards. Zaroff then fakes a seizure, stabs Ramo, and takes Polly as a hostage. Ramo survives and goes to warn the Doctor, which gives Jamie, Sean, and Jacko the chance to rescue Polly. Zaroff escapes and goes straight to Thous. Thous begins to worry about the strike amongst the Fish People and realises Zaroff is mad. He immediately orders him to stop his plans, but this angers Zaroff, who shoots Thous and his royal protectors.

With Zaroff out of sight, the Doctor finds Thous bleeding but alive and takes him to the temple of Amdo for safety. He plans to stop Zaroff by sinking Atlantis even further so the reactor and Zaroff's laboratory could be destroyed. The Doctor and Ben cause a radiation leak to put their plan in action while Sean and Jacko warn the Atlanteans to get to higher level. The walls of Atlantis start to crumble but Polly and Jamie find a way out to the surface. When the Doctor and Ben find Zaroff, he is determined to not let anything stop him, even the flooding. They trick Zaroff and lock him out of his laboratory just in time but he won't give up which results in his death by drowning. The Doctor and Ben make their way towards the surface where they reunite with Jamie and Polly. Knowing many will have survived the crisis, the Doctor and his companions flee in the TARDIS.

== Production ==
Working titles for this story include Under the Sea, Atlanta and The Fish People. The history of this script was particularly troubled. After its commission, it was dropped from the production schedule, partly because of concerns that it would require a higher budget than was available. A new script by William Emms, "The Imps", was commissioned to replace it; Emms, however, subsequently fell ill. When it was realised that it was unlikely that he would be able to complete changes to the script, which was due to begin shooting in a month, the original script, now titled "The Underwater Menace", was brought back into the schedule. A further complication arose because Frazer Hines was brought on as a regular member of the cast barely a month before the serial was due to start production, and his character, Jamie, had to be worked into the script. Because of all of these problems, the individual episodes were recorded just a week before they were due to be broadcast. Recordings took place at Riverside Studios in Hammersmith in January 1967.

In December 2011, the BBC announced that Episode 2, previously missing, had been discovered among material bought by former TV engineer Terry Burnett with only cuts from Australian censors missing. The missing frames are still held by the National Archives of Australia, and, once re-incorporated, made the episode complete for the first time since the master tape was wiped in July 1969. A brief clip of Zaroff drowning from episode 4 survives for similar censorship reasons. Brief moments from the Episode 1 cliffhanger also exist due to censorship.

Actor Patrick Troughton was reputedly particularly unhappy about the production. He is reported to have described the show as having "ridiculous costumes and make-up of the fish people". Producer Innes Lloyd appeared to concur, admitting "it did look like something from a '50s American 'B' movie".

=== Cast notes ===
Colin Jeavons later appeared in the Doctor Who spin-off pilot K-9 and Company. Noel Johnson later played Sir Charles Grover in Invasion of the Dinosaurs (1974). Peter Stephens had previously appeared in The Celestial Toymaker (1966).

== Broadcast and reception ==
Episode	Title	Run time	Original release date	UK viewers (millions)	Archive
1	"Episode 1"^{†}	24:18	14 January 1967	8.3	Only audio, stills and fragments exist
2	"Episode 2"	25:00	21 January 1967	7.5	16mm t/r
3	"Episode 3"	24:09	28 January 1967	7.1	16mm t/r
4	"Episode 4"^{†}	23:20	4 February 1967	7.0	Only audio, stills and fragments exist

^† Episode is missing

Doctor Who: The Television Companion's David Howe and Stephen Walker were unimpressed by the story, stating that despite reasonable dialogue, effective sets and effects it was otherwise "very difficult to find anything good to say about this story, which is undoubtedly the weakest of the second Doctor's era, if not of the sixties as a whole".

Starburst's Paul Mount said the serial was "tacky, cheap and unsubtle" but partially redeemed by "a sterling performance from Patrick Troughton, rising way above often lamentable material".

CultBox's Ian McArdell received the story more positively praising Troughton's "wonderfully charismatic" performance and Joseph Furst's "genuinely scary" Zaroff. He did note however that the Fish People's costumes were "frankly bizarre" and "their floating ballet sequence from Episode 3, though ambitious, fails to achieve".

In the Doctor Who Magazine poll for the show's 60th anniversary in 2023, The Underwater Menace was voted the nineteenth best story (third worst) of the Second Doctor's tenure, out of a total of 21. Charlie Jane Anders ranked the serial as the 197th best Doctor Who story (out of 254) and a "below-average" story in 2015, writing, "I kind of love this story. Troughton is amazing in it." Den of Geek's Andrew Blair selected The Underwater Menace as one of the ten Doctor Who stories that would make great musicals.

== Commercial releases ==
=== In print ===
The Underwater Menace
- Author: Nigel Robinson
- Cover artist: Alister Pearson
- Series: Doctor Who book: Target novelisations
- Release number: 129
- Publisher: Target Books
- Publication date: 21 July 1988
- ISBN: 0-426-20326-7

A novelisation of this serial, written by Nigel Robinson, was published by Target Books in February 1988.

=== Home media ===
As with all missing episodes, off-air recordings of the soundtrack exist due to contemporary fan efforts. In February 2005, these were released on CD, accompanied by linking narration from Anneke Wills. Episode three was released on VHS in 1998, along with the documentary "The Missing Years". They were later included on the Lost in Time DVD set; several brief surviving film clips were also included.

Episode 2, which was found in December 2011, was initially prepared for release on DVD in 2014. After an extended period of uncertainty, the BBC confirmed a release date of 26 October 2015. The two surviving episodes are supplemented by reconstructions of the missing two episodes, using restored audio and stills from the production. They were originally due to be animated, but the project was abruptly cancelled after the studio raised its commissioning prices.

On 29 May 2020, the television soundtrack, again with narration by Wills, was released on vinyl by Demon Music Group.

A second DVD release – this time fully animated in colour and black and white – was announced on 11 August 2023, with the release date scheduled for November 13 of the same year.
