= Joseph Fürst =

Austrian actor (1916–2005)

- Fürst as Zaroff in The Underwater Menace (1967)
- Born: Joseph Fürst; 13 February 1916; Vienna, Austria-Hungary
- Died: 29 November 2005 (aged 89); Bateau Bay, New South Wales, Australia
- Occupation: Actor
- Years active: 1953–1986
- Notable work: Doctor Who: The Underwater Menace (1967)

Joseph Fürst (13 February 1916 – 29 November 2005) was an Austrian-born international film and television actor known for his English language roles in Britain and Australia, after first appearing on the Canadian stage.

== Career ==
In the 1950s, Fürst acted and directed on the Canadian stage. At the Crest Theatre, he appeared in The Gift of the Serpent and directed The Fourposter and Misery Me in 1955 and 1956.

Fürst was regularly featured in UK television drama series of the 1960s and early 1970s with appearances in The Saint, The Champions, Doomwatch, The Persuaders!, and in the Doctor Who story The Underwater Menace. Many people believe his accent in this role to have been put on; this is incorrect, it was in fact his real accent. He also played the role of Schneider in the Armchair Theatre play "A Magnum for Schneider".

Fürst's film appearances included 55 Days at Peking (1963), The Brides of Fu Manchu (1966), the James Bond movie Diamonds Are Forever (1971) as Dr Metz, and Inn of the Damned (1975).

He emigrated to Australia and, starting in the mid-1970s, acted in several guest roles on Australian television drama series. They included several appearances in the police drama Division 4, produced by Crawford Productions in the 1970s. He played an ongoing role in soap opera Number 96 in 1976 as deli owner Carlo Lenzi, who was introduced to the series as a new Italian family alongside Arianthe Galani and Harry Michaels, his character romanced wine bar proprietor Norma Whittaker (Sheila Kennelly). He also played Heinrik Smeaton in The Young Doctors in 1979, and was a guest on situation comedy Kingswood Country, again opposite Kennelly. He guest starred in four episodes of A Country Practice in the early 1980s. In 1984, he starred in the ABC TV film The Schippan Mystery.

Shortly before his death, Fürst was interviewed by Dwayne Bunney and Dallas Jones for "Loose Cannon" and spoke about his career. The interview was an extra feature in the reconstruction of the missing Doctor Who story "The Underwater Menace".

== Filmography ==
Year	Title	Role	Notes
1960	Exodus	Avidan	Film debut
1961	Very Important Person	Luftwaffe Interrogator	
1961	Offbeat	Paul Vama	
1962	Freud: The Secret Passion	Herr Jacob Koertner	
1963	55 Days at Peking	Capt. Hanselman	
1964	The High Bright Sun	Dr. Andros	
1966	The Brides of Fu Manchu	Otto Lentz	
1966	Drop Dead Darling	German Brasshat	
1967	Theatre of Death	Karl Schiller	
1968	Hammerhead	Count Ortega	
1970	Eyewitness	Local Police Sergeant	
1970	Goodbye Gemini	Georgiu	
1971	Diamonds Are Forever	Professor Dr. Metz	
1973	And Millions Will Die	Franz Kessler	
1975	Inn of the Damned	Lazar Straulle	
1975	Plugg	Judge, Fraudenheist	Final film

== Television roles ==
Year	Title	Role	Notes
1960–1967	Armchair Theatre	Various roles	Three episodes
1961	Ghost Squad	Koster	Episode: "Assassin"
1961	Maigret	Gastin	Episode: "The Liars"
1961	One Step Beyond	Judge	Episode: "The Sorcerer"
1963–1966	The Saint	Various roles	Three episodes
1964	Espionage	Von Elm	Episode: "Medal for a Turned Coat"
1964	The Wednesday Play	General Fritz Fromm	Episode: "The July Plot"
1966	The Baron	Colonel Jan Bucholz	Episode: "Enemy of the State"
1967	Doctor Who	Professor Hermann Zaroff	Serial: "The Underwater Menace"
1968	The Champions	Various roles	Two episodes
1970	Doomwatch	Dr. Charles Goldsworthy	Episode: "Re-Entry Forbidden"
1970	Callan	Sabovski	Episode: "A Village Called "G""
1971	The Persuaders!	Yelker	Episode: "The Ozerhov Inheritance"
1982	A Country Practice	Alex Popovich	Four episodes
