= Doctor Who Restoration Team =

Loose collection of Doctor Who fans

The Doctor Who Restoration Team is a loose collective of Doctor Who fans, many within the television industry, who restore Doctor Who episodes for release on a variety of formats. It was formed in 1992 by a group of fans who asked for and received funding from the BBC to perform colour restorations on a series of Jon Pertwee Doctor Who episodes. The group has worked with BBC Television and BBC Worldwide and has restored many of the final Doctor Who VHS releases and all of the "classic series" DVD and Blu-Ray releases to date.

== Restoration ==
During the original colour restorations, the team were keen to present the episodes as close to the original broadcast master tapes as possible, as explained by senior Restoration Team content producer Steve Roberts:

"One thing which the team had to constantly be wary of was the temptation to not just restore, but to also improve on the original ... This would not be in the spirit of restoration, and the viewer would not be seeing a fair representation of the story as it originally was."

In 1997, whilst working on the VHS release of The War Machines, the approach of straight restoration, that of returning the episodes to their original state, competed with the desire to improve upon what was originally broadcast. Sound engineer Mark Ayres explained the difficulties:

"There are some difficult decisions as to how far I should take my work. Because the original video has been transferred to film, I've tried to remove anything which was added during the process of optical copying – in other words taking it back to its condition on original transmission."

The War Machines featured a couple of instances of sound effects being faded in at the wrong points during the original studio recordings. Ayres:

"It would be very easy to 'grab' a sound effect, and put it back where it's supposed to be. I haven't done it, because it was wrongly done at the time, and that's the way it should stay. All I've tried to do is correct technical defects which have occurred later with the film, I haven't corrected things which were done wrongly on the original tapes. Except in two places."

Ayres edited two instances of the original sound engineer on the serial fading the audio up and down quickly and creating uneven sound levels.

Since work on the Doctor Who DVD releases began, the frequency of these edits and revisions has increased. The earliest releases had the colour graded to appear more consistent. Later releases have had their opening and closing credits remade to match the originals using modern software and electronic fonts, untidy transitional frames have often been removed resulting in a fractionally shorter running time, miscued sound effects are routinely adjusted and visual effects considered substandard are adjusted. The colour grading is often noticeably different from the broadcast originals.

For example, when recreating effects for the serial The Pirate Planet, the team explained that "in the remade version, we took the liberty of allowing the wrench to be blasted back towards the camera at this point to help 'sell' the effect better."

== Members ==
One member, Mark Ayres, has done much of the audio restoration work for the final VHS releases, as well as many of the DVD releases, and all of the "Missing Soundtrack" CD releases since 1999. Other known team members, past and present, include:

- James Russell
- Ralph Montagu
- Steve Roberts, VidFIRE
- Paul Vanezis, video restoration
- Richard Molesworth
- Peter Finklestone, designer of VidFIRE
- Peter Crocker, director of SVS Resources
- Steve Broster
- Richard Bignell
- John Kelly
- Ed Stradling
- Jonathan Wood, video restoration
- Steven Bagley
- Jenny Day, Quad tape and film transfer

== See also ==
- Doctor Who missing episodes
- List of Doctor Who serials
- List of Doctor Who DVD releases
- List of Doctor Who Blu-ray releases
- Doctor Who DVD Files
