= Tele-snaps =

British television photos produced by John Cura

Tele-snaps (often known as telesnaps) were off-screen photographs of British television broadcasts, taken and sold commercially by John Cura (born Alberto Giovanni Cura in Clapham, South London, England; 9 April 1902 – 21 April 1969). From 1947 until 1968, Cura ran a business selling the 250,000-plus tele-snaps he took. The photographs were snapped in half of a normal frame of 35mm film, at an exposure of 1/25th of a second. Generally around 70–80 tele-snaps were taken of each programme. They were mostly purchased by actors and directors to use as records and examples of their work before the prevalence of videocassette recorders.

For many early programmes tele-snaps are the only surviving record of their appearance. From the 1990s onwards, tele-snaps have often been used by groups of fans to recreate lost Doctor Who episodes, creating "reconstructions" by marrying the images to fan-recorded off-air soundtracks of the episodes.

== History ==
A sequence of tele-snaps from the missing Out of the Unknown episode "The Prophet"

From an early age, Cura had been interested in electronics and photography, developing a reputation among his family as a "Heath Robinson inventor". In June 1946, the BBC resumed its television service following the hiatus imposed by the Second World War. Cura, recently demobilised from the RAF, combined his twin passions of photography and electronics and began to experiment with developing a camera that could take pictures from a television screen. He eventually came up with a mechanism that took half-frame 18×24 mm images on 35 mm film (i.e. the same format as in 35 mm motion picture cameras), at a speed of 1/25th of a second.

Once satisfied with his process, Cura wrote to the BBC on 11 September 1947 enclosing samples of his work and requesting permission to exploit the images commercially. Cura's request caused considerable consternation in the BBC's legal department who were concerned about copyright. Ultimately, the BBC concluded that a television image was not covered by existing copyright law and replied to Cura giving him permission to proceed but to "only photograph the television image of individual artists who have instructed you to do so prior to their television appearance", and not to "give or sell the photographs to anyone other than the artist in question". Cura often ignored this restriction, however, frequently sending tele-snaps to artists on spec in the hope of attracting business from them. Many of his clients were BBC programme makers who found his photographs useful records of their work.

In 1951, Cura came once again to the attention of the BBC's lawyers when he requested that he be allowed to photograph entire BBC productions, writing that his service "enables you to have a permanent pictorial record for valuable reference in years to come, of series which have a brief life of an hour or so and are then lost forever". The BBC had also been contacted by several newspapers at this time, looking for permission to use Cura's tele-snaps—especially after it transpired that Cura had taken the only image of Oxford's boat sinking during that year's Boat Race between Oxford and Cambridge. The BBC made petitions to the Houses of Parliament to have the Copyright Acts overhauled to give them legal certainty regarding the issue. Although a revised Copyright Bill was enacted in 1956, it did little to curtail Cura's activities.

Cura's business was at its peak in the mid-fifties, his business having doubled overnight following the launch of ITV in 1955. A second television set was purchased and a second camera constructed to enable Cura to photograph both channels. Cura also enjoyed success with two best-selling books on improving television reception and correcting picture faults, which were illustrated with his tele-snaps. He also appeared on the BBC's television panel game show What's My Line?. Celebrity clients of the tele-snaps service included Benny Hill and the Beverley Sisters. By 1959, Cura claimed to have taken over 250,000 tele-snaps and that sets of his tele-snaps had been "presented to and graciously accepted by the Royal Family; Their Majesties the King of Denmark; the late King of Norway; Queen Juliana of the Netherlands; Ex-president Auriol of France; Earl Attlee; Sir Winston Churchill; Mr Charles Chaplin; Mrs Eleanor Roosevelt" as well as a wide range of newspapers and periodicals. However, when Cura raised the prices for his service in 1964, the BBC ordered a review of the tele-snap service, which at this stage was costing them £1,300 per annum, and, with many programmes now routinely recorded on film or video, the business began to decline.

John Cura continued to take tele-snaps right up within a few months of his death in 1969 from colon cancer. His widow offered her late husband's collection of tele-snaps to the BBC but was turned down. It is believed that they were subsequently destroyed. However, many copies of tele-snaps survive on broadcasters' production files and in the private collections of many of the artists and technicians whose work Cura photographed.

== Cultural significance ==
In the early days of television, the means of making recordings of television programmes were limited and programmes were, in the main, transmitted live. This began to change as techniques for recording programmes onto film (telerecording) and, later, videotape were developed in the 1950s. Even after the technology for recording programmes had become the norm, it was a common practice, due to a combination of the costs of storage and restrictions on broadcasting repeats, for UK broadcasters to wipe programmes after transmission. As a result, John Cura's tele-snaps are often the only surviving record of many lost programmes from the early years of television.

Tele-snaps have been used to reconstruct lost television shows by marrying up the tele-snaps with audio recordings of missing shows to create a slide-show backed by the programme's soundtrack. Most notably, this technique has been employed, on an amateur, not-for-profit basis, by some enthusiasts of the British science fiction series Doctor Who, which has nearly a hundred missing episodes. Some professional reconstructions using tele-snaps have also been created, including:

- A brief (15-minute) reconstruction of episodes two and three of the Doctor Who serial The Ice Warriors for its VHS videotape release in 1998.
- A full reconstruction of the final episode of the Doctor Who serial The Tenth Planet for its VHS videotape release in 2000.
- A full reconstruction of the Doctor Who serial The Power of the Daleks for the MP3 CD release of that story in 2005. This reconstruction was later included in the DVD release of an animated version of the serial in 2016.
- Similar full reconstructions of all four episodes of The Macra Terror, episodes 2,4,5 and 6 of The Faceless Ones, all six episodes of Fury from the Deep, episode 3 of The Web of Fear, all six episodes of The Power of the Daleks and episodes 1 & 3-7 of The Evil of the Daleks (with the surviving parts represented by the original episodes and surviving footage) have also been included in the subsequent DVD releases of the animated versions.
- A condensed (30-minute) reconstruction of the seven-part Doctor Who serial Marco Polo for the DVD release, "The Beginning", in 2006.
- A condensed reconstruction of the missing episodes of the 1961 science fiction serial A for Andromeda for its DVD release in 2006. Since at the time of release no soundtrack for the missing episodes of this serial existed, this reconstruction is backed by music used in the serial with on-screen captions employed to narrate the story. The full soundtrack of the partially-existing episode 7 was subsequently recovered.
- Narrated reconstructions of episodes from the first season of The Avengers have been included as extras on the Region 2 DVDs of the series released by Optimum.
