= Doctor Who Online =

News, information, and forum site

- Website type: News site & fan discussion forum
- Available in: English
- Owner: Sebastian J. Brook
- Website: http://www.drwho-online.co.uk/
- Registration: Free
- Launched: 1996 (originally named 'Doctor Who: The Regenerative website')
- Current status: Active

Doctor Who Online (or DWO by its users) has, since 1996, been a UK-based news, information, and forum site dedicated to the British science fiction television programme Doctor Who. A regular feature on the website is the Doctor Who: DWO Whocast Podcast, started in April 2006.

== Site history ==
The site was founded as Doctor Who: The REGENERATIVE website in 1996, as a site for fans to find out news and guides for the show while it was off the air. The website was created by science fiction fan Sebastian J. Brook. When it launched, there was no current series of Doctor Who and the show was not shown in a regular cycle. The website detailed when previous episodes were scheduled to repeat on television. In 2000, the website changed its name to Doctor Who Online in response to former Doctor Tom Baker, who suggested the name would suit the website better. Many of the features the website originally had, such as the News section, still remain.

== Features ==
The original website had regular features, including: news, episode guides, magazine releases (often featuring Doctor Who Magazine) and convention information. The site has its own Minecraft server, containing a survival section, a minigames section where players can participate in Doctor Who-themed games and challenges, and a creative section where players can construct Doctor Who-inspired builds and replicas.

=== Dr. Who News ===
The news section of the Doctor Who Online website has regular news features and contributors who help to document Doctor Who broadcast and merchandise announcements. The section also includes news from spin-off shows Torchwood and The Sarah Jane Adventures. In November 2010, a Doctor Who Online News teamed up with Blendtec for a Doctor Who: Will it Blend? Doctor Who Special, in which DWO editor Brook and Tom Dickson, a Blendtec C.E.O, attempt to blend an Ironside Dalek action figure. The video has proven popular on YouTube with over 200,000 views so far.

=== DWO Whocast ===
The Whocast (officially titled Doctor Who Podcast: DWO WhoCast) is a weekly podcast featured by the site. The Whocast was started in April 2006 by Paul A.T. Wilson, during the original run of Series 2 of Doctor Who, and in conjunction with a Doctor Who meeting group based in London. In September 2006, The Whocast teamed up with DWO, with a significant format change and the addition of a co-host. With the format change, the podcast attracted more listeners and experienced a dramatic growth in listenership.

The podcast usually features interviews with people involved with the new and the old series of Doctor Who and Big Finish Productions. Interviews with members of the cast and crew from the classic and the new series of Doctor Who are common; the team are regularly joined by actors who have played the Doctor, such as Colin Baker and Peter Davison. They have had members of the effects team such as Neill Gorton and Mat Irvine as well as other members of acting and production staff.

== Community ==
The original forum went live in April 2003 and was originally powered using the "ezboard provider". Due to increased membership, the forum was upgraded a few years later. The online community has over 48,000 members. Discussion frequently takes place on the most recent televised Doctor Who episodes. Comments center on novels, video, audio, merchandise, and past Doctor Who adventures as well. The Doctor Who Online forums are frequently used by the British media to gauge Doctor Who fan opinions. For example, the announcement of the new costume for the Eleventh incarnation of the Doctor (Matt Smith) was the subject of discussion on the forum, which was reported on by the BBC News Magazine website. The choice of actor to play the Eleventh incarnation was also heavily discussed. When the actor announcement was made, Brook commented: "...I think it is the right choice. It is good that they have got a young guy with lots of energy."

== Reception ==
A review of the website by BBC Radio 2's Miles Mendoza described it as "...one of the most popular and longest established [Doctor Who sites]". The leading UK Science Fiction magazine, SciFiNow, cited the site as "the web's premiere Doctor Who site".

== See also ==
- Doctor Who: Podshock
