= Doctor Who season 3 =

1965–1966 season of British TV series

Doctor Who
- Season 3
- Cover art of the Region 2 DVD release for the first serial of the season
- Starring: William Hartnell; Maureen O'Brien; Peter Purves; Adrienne Hill; Jean Marsh; Jackie Lane; Anneke Wills; Michael Craze
- No. of stories: 10
- No. of episodes: 45 (26 missing)

Release
- Original network: BBC1
- Original release: 11 September 1965 – 16 July 1966

Season chronology
- ← Previous; Season 2 Next → Season 4

The third season of the British science fiction television series Doctor Who was originally broadcast on BBC1 between 1965 and 1966. The season began on 11 September 1965 with Galaxy 4 and ended with The War Machines on 16 July 1966. The production team underwent several changes; Verity Lambert, the programme's original producer, was replaced by John Wiles, who developed a positive working relationship with the new story editor, Donald Tosh. Wiles and Tosh both departed later in the season, replaced by Innes Lloyd and Gerry Davis, respectively. Early stories carried over from Lambert's leadership, and many of Wiles and Tosh's later serials were altered by their successors.

The season continued to star William Hartnell as the first incarnation of the Doctor, an alien who travels through time and space in his TARDIS, which appears to be a British police box on the outside. Maureen O'Brien and Peter Purves continued their roles as the Doctor's companions, Vicki and Steven Taylor. O'Brien departed at the conclusion of the third serial, The Myth Makers, replaced by Adrienne Hill as Katarina. Hill's tenure was brief, replaced in the following serial, The Daleks' Master Plan, by Jean Marsh as Sara Kingdom, who also departed by the story's end. Jackie Lane joined the series as Dodo Chaplet in The Massacre; both she and Purves departed by the season's end: Purves in The Savages and Lane in The War Machines, replaced in the latter by Anneke Wills and Michael Craze as Ben and Polly.

The ten serials were written by ten writers: Tosh, William Emms, Terry Nation, Donald Cotton, Dennis Spooner, John Lucarotti, Paul Erickson, Lesley Scott, Brian Hayles, and Ian Stuart Black. The serials were mostly directed by newcomers, Derek Martinus, Michael Leeston-Smith, Paddy Russell, Michael Imison, Bill Sellars, and Michael Ferguson; the exceptions were Douglas Camfield, Rex Tucker, and Christopher Barry, who were involved in earlier seasons. The first five episodes were filmed from July to August 1965 within the same production block as the second season; the remainder of the season began recording in September and lasted approximately ten months, with weekly recording taking place mostly at Riverside Studios or the BBC Television Centre.

The 45-episode season was watched by an average of 7.65 million viewers. It started strong with Galaxy 4, peaking at 11 million viewers, though it gradually decreased to a nadir of 4.5 million during The Savages, the lowest since the first episode in 1963. Critics praised the direction and performances, particularly Hartnell and Purves, and the ambition and themes were well-received despite mixed thoughts on their execution. Audience response saw consistent Appreciation Index scores, peaking for The Daleks' Master Plan but receiving Doctor Who's lowest ever score during The Gunfighters. Several serials were erased by the BBC from 1967, though some were eventually recovered; 26 episodes remain missing. The serials received several audio, VHS, and DVD releases as well as tie-in novels, and some missing stories were reconstructed using animation and off-air audio recordings.

== Cast and characters ==
- William Hartnell as the First Doctor, the original incarnation of the Doctor, a Time Lord who travels the universe in a time travelling spaceship called the TARDIS with companions. Initially irascible and prickly, the Doctor has warmed up to his companions. He is eccentric and occasionally aloof, dressing in an Edwardian-style costume, and possesses an academic interest in human history and an aversion to violence.
- Maureen O'Brien as Vicki, a teenager from the planet Dido in the 25th century. She possesses a youthful enthusiasm, adolescent charm, and adventurous spirit, though she is feminised and often helpless, treated as childlike by many, including the Doctor, with whom she grows close. Vicki has some technological skills, which are occasionally useful.
- Peter Purves as Steven Taylor, an astronaut shipwrecked on Mechanus who escapes on the TARDIS. He is courageous and headstrong, outwardly acting like an action hero but possessing chivalrous gallantry and emotional depth. Steven is argumentative at times, disagreeing with the Doctor on several occasions, and prefers to make his own decisions.
- Adrienne Hill as Katarina, a handmaiden to the Trojan priestess Cassandra in 1184 BC. She is timid and helpless, with a naïve speaking pattern, no education, and limited knowledge of technology; she believes that the Doctor is Zeus and the TARDIS his temple. She knows that she will die and believes he is taking her to the afterlife. The Doctor appreciates her simple and worshipful attitude.
- Jean Marsh as Sara Kingdom, an agent of the Space Security Service. She is armed and powerful but quickly believes what others tell her. Sara is a dedicated soldier loyal to Mavic Chen, the Guardian of the Solar System, for whom she kills her own brother, Bret Vyon; however, upon learning Mavic Chen's intentions, she dissents, joining the Doctor and Steven to defeat the Daleks.
- Jackie Lane as Dorothea "Dodo" Chaplet, a young woman from England. A descendant of Anne Chaplet, a servant girl from 16th-century Paris, she is childlike, carefree, and naïve, bearing a resemblance to the Doctor's granddaughter, Susan. Her fast speech and use of slang distracts frustrates the Doctor, though they quickly become close. Dodo is introduced with a Mancunian accent but soon loses it.
- Anneke Wills as Polly, a 24-year-old secretary from London. She is an it girl, representing Swinging London. Polly is upbeat and intelligent but impulsive and occasionally naïve, easily frightened when faced with danger.
- Michael Craze as Ben Jackson, a 24-year-old able seaman with the Royal Navy. He is loyal, courageous, and resourceful, and his technical knowledge and practical experience often prove useful in helping the Doctor. Ben and Polly soon grow close after meeting.

== Serials ==
No. story	No. in season	Serial title	Episode titles	Directed by	Written by	Original release date	Prod. code	UK viewers (millions)	AI
18	1	Galaxy 4	"Four Hundred Dawns"^{†}	Derek Martinus	William Emms	11 September 1965	T	9.0	56
18	1	Galaxy 4	"Trap of Steel"^{†}	Derek Martinus	William Emms	18 September 1965	T	9.5	55
18	1	Galaxy 4	"Air Lock"	Derek Martinus	William Emms	25 September 1965	T	11.3	54
18	1	Galaxy 4	"The Exploding Planet"^{†}	Derek Martinus	William Emms	2 October 1965	T	9.9	53
The First Doctor and his companions, Vicki and Steven Taylor, arrive on a silent planet and encounter short, non-humanoid robots, dubbed "Chumblies". An all-female party of cloned Drahvin warriors disable one of the robots. The Drahvins, dominated by their cruel leader, Maaga, are at war with the reptilian Rills, the masters of the Chumblies. Maaga and her warriors seek to capture the Rill ship to escape the dying planet. Maaga describes the Drahvins as the victims of the conflict with the Rills, but the Doctor is not convinced. Using the TARDIS, he calculates the planet will break up in two days' time. The Drahvins send the Doctor and Vicki to seize control of the Rill ship. The Doctor learns the Rills are an advanced species who offered to take the Drahvins away with them; Maaga refused, preferring to remain at war. The Doctor develops a power converter linked to the TARDIS, which charges the Rill craft. Maaga leads the Drahvins in a final assault but the Chumblies power up their ship and leave the planet. A Chumbley helps the Doctor, Vicki, and Steven to return to the TARDIS. The planet explodes, killing the Drahvins.
19	2	"Mission to the Unknown"^{†}	N/A	Derek Martinus	Terry Nation	9 October 1965	T/A	8.3	54
On the planet Kembel, Marc Cory and Gordon Lowery attempt to repair their spacecraft when they are attacked by Jeff Garvey. Cory shoots Garvey dead. Bringing Lowery into the spacecraft for debriefing, Cory explains himself to be a Space Security agent assigned to investigate a possible Dalek base for a galactic invasion. Outside, Garvey's body mutates into a Varga plant. Cory stands guard against the slow-moving Varga plants whilst Lowery finishes constructing a rescue beacon. Cory deduces the Daleks are planning something with another galactic power. As Lowery is about to record a message, Cory notices something moving in the jungle. They flee as the Dalek patrol arrives and destroys their ship. Cory is compelled to kill Lowery on discovering he is infected by a Varga plant, then records a message, only to be surrounded by the Daleks and exterminated. The taped message lies unregarded in the undergrowth. In the Dalek base, the representatives from seven galaxies have gathered in a conference room. They approve an alliance, agreeing with the Daleks' plan to take over the Solar System.
20	3	The Myth Makers	"Temple of Secrets"^{†}	Michael Leeston-Smith	Donald Cotton	16 October 1965	U	8.3	48
20	3	The Myth Makers	"Small Prophet, Quick Return"^{†}	Michael Leeston-Smith	Donald Cotton	23 October 1965	U	8.1	51
20	3	The Myth Makers	"Death of a Spy"^{†}	Michael Leeston-Smith	Donald Cotton	30 October 1965	U	8.7	49
20	3	The Myth Makers	"Horse of Destruction"^{†}	Michael Leeston-Smith	Donald Cotton	6 November 1965	U	8.3	52
The Greeks capture the Doctor and Steven after the TARDIS lands outside Troy during the Trojan War. The prophet Cassandra demands the TARDIS be burnt; Vicki emerges before the fire is lit, taken as a sign from the gods. She is renamed Cressida and made a court favourite, enraging Cassandra, who believes Vicki to be a rival prophet. Steven adopts the identity Diomedes and persuades the Greeks to send him to Troy. Vicki greets him with his real name, which Cassandra sees as a sign they are both spies; they are imprisoned. Vicki persuades Troilus to get them released, and they begin to fall in love. At the Doctor's proposal, the Greeks pretend to sail away, leaving a wooden horse outside Troy as acknowledgement of defeat. The horse is brought into the city. At nightfall, the Greeks and the Doctor exit the horse and open the city gates, allowing the Greek army to enter and battle. Cassandra's handmaiden, Katarina, helps the wounded Steven return to the TARDIS. Vicki leaves the Doctor to find Troilus; outside the doomed city, they declare their love for each other and flee. The Doctor, Steven, and Katarina leave in the TARDIS.
21	4	The Daleks' Master Plan	"The Nightmare Begins"	Douglas Camfield	Terry Nation	13 November 1965	V	9.1	54
21	4	The Daleks' Master Plan	"Day of Armageddon"	Douglas Camfield	Terry Nation	20 November 1965	V	9.8	52
21	4	The Daleks' Master Plan	"Devil's Planet"	Douglas Camfield	Terry Nation	27 November 1965	V	10.3	52
21	4	The Daleks' Master Plan	"The Traitors"^{†}	Douglas Camfield	Terry Nation	4 December 1965	V	9.5	51
21	4	The Daleks' Master Plan	"Counter Plot"	Douglas Camfield	Terry Nation	11 December 1965	V	9.9	53
21	4	The Daleks' Master Plan	"Coronas of the Sun"^{†}	Douglas Camfield	Dennis Spooner	18 December 1965	V	9.1	56
21	4	The Daleks' Master Plan	"The Feast of Steven"^{†}	Douglas Camfield	Terry Nation	25 December 1965	V	7.9	39
21	4	The Daleks' Master Plan	"Volcano"^{†}	Douglas Camfield	Dennis Spooner	1 January 1966	V	9.6	49
21	4	The Daleks' Master Plan	"Golden Death"^{†}	Douglas Camfield	Dennis Spooner	8 January 1966	V	9.2	52
21	4	The Daleks' Master Plan	"Escape Switch"	Douglas Camfield	Dennis Spooner	15 January 1966	V	9.5	50
21	4	The Daleks' Master Plan	"The Abandoned Planet"^{†}	Douglas Camfield	Dennis Spooner	22 January 1966	V	9.8	49
21	4	The Daleks' Master Plan	"Destruction of Time"^{†}	Douglas Camfield	Dennis Spooner	29 January 1966	V	8.6	57
On Kembel, the Doctor and Bret Vyon, a Space Agent, discover the Daleks have established a galactic alliance to conquer humanity with a Time Destructor, which can destroy life by accelerating time. The Guardian of the Solar System, Mavic Chen, has provided the weapon's power core, which the Doctor steals before escaping in Chen's ship with Steven, Katarina, and Bret. When a stowaway takes Katarina hostage, she ejects them both into space, where they die. The ship returns to Earth, where Bret is killed by his sister, Sara Kingdom, on Chen's orders. Sara agrees to work with the Doctor and Steven, and they return to Kembel. The Doctor and Steven create a fake core, which they dupe the Daleks into accepting before fleeing in the TARDIS with Sara. They eventually reach Egypt, where the Monk forces the Doctor to relinquish the real core. The Doctor steals the directional control from the Monk's TARDIS and returns to Kembel. The Daleks kill Chen and the Doctor steals the Time Destructor, which activates; Sara ages to death, while Steven and the Doctor reach the TARDIS. The Daleks try to destroy the Time Destructor but it kills them, wiping out the planet's life.
22	5	The Massacre	"War of God"^{†}	Paddy Russell	John Lucarotti	5 February 1966	W	8.0	52
22	5	The Massacre	"The Sea Beggar"^{†}	Paddy Russell	John Lucarotti	12 February 1966	W	6.0	52
22	5	The Massacre	"Priest of Death"^{†}	Paddy Russell	John Lucarotti	19 February 1966	W	5.9	49
22	5	The Massacre	"Bell of Doom"^{†}	Paddy Russell	John Lucarotti and Donald Tosh	26 February 1966	W	5.8	53
The Doctor and Steven arrive in Paris in 1572 amidst tensions between the Huguenots and Catholics. Steven spends the night at the home of Nicholas Muss, a Huguenot. They find a servant girl, Anne Chaplet, who is terrified after overhearing Catholic guards speaking of a coming massacre of Huguenots. The next day, the Abbot of Amboise sends his secretary Colbert to find Anne. Steven becomes convinced that the Abbot is the Doctor in disguise. Steven overhears Colbert and an assassin plotting to kill "the sea beggar". As night falls, Steven finds Anne following him. They call upon the Abbot but are forced to flee after Steven realises the Abbot is not the Doctor. After the Abbot is killed, Anne and Steven find the Doctor. The Doctor insists that he and Steven depart immediately. He and Steven reach the TARDIS and depart as the massacre begins. Steven is angry that the Doctor made him leave, but the Doctor insists that history could not be changed. A young girl enters the TARDIS and it soon dematerialises. Steven's heart softens when she introduces herself as Dodo Chaplet; Steven wonders if she is Anne's descendant.
23	6	The Ark	"The Steel Sky"	Michael Imison	Paul Erickson and Lesley Scott	5 March 1966	X	5.5	55
23	6	The Ark	"The Plague"	Michael Imison	Paul Erickson and Lesley Scott	12 March 1966	X	6.9	56
23	6	The Ark	"The Return"	Michael Imison	Paul Erickson and Lesley Scott	19 March 1966	X	6.2	51
23	6	The Ark	"The Bomb"	Michael Imison	Paul Erickson and Lesley Scott	26 March 1966	X	7.3	50
Around ten million years in the future, the Doctor, Steven, and Dodo discover Earth is about to be destroyed by the Sun's expansion; a vast spacecraft has begun a 700-year voyage to the planet Refusis II, with millions of humans stored in miniaturised form. The ship is commanded by human Guardians, while menial work is undertaken by a race called Monoids. Dodo's cold fatally spreads though the ship. The TARDIS crew, accused of deliberately infecting the inhabitants, are sentenced to death until the Doctor creates a vaccine and administers it to the infected, who recover. The group observe Earth's destruction before the Doctor, Steven, and Dodo depart. 700 years later, they return and discover the Monoids have taken control while the human descendants, genetically weakened by the cold virus, are now slaves. The Monoid leader takes the Doctor and Dodo to Refusis II and discover a castle occupied by the Refusians, giant invisible beings. The Monoids plan to colonise Refusis II and abandon the human slaves on the spacecraft. A faction of Monoids, uncertain of the planet's viability, begin a revolt. The Refusians agree to share their planet with the colonists, demanding the humans and Monoids live in peace.
24	7	The Celestial Toymaker	"The Celestial Toyroom"^{†}	Bill Sellars	Brian Hayles (Note: The scripts for The Celestial Toymaker were written by Gerry Davis with material by Donald Tosh from an idea by Brian Hayles. Hayles received the writing credit.)	2 April 1966	Y	8.0	48
24	7	The Celestial Toymaker	"The Hall of Dolls"^{†}	Bill Sellars	Brian Hayles	9 April 1966	Y	8.0	49
24	7	The Celestial Toymaker	"The Dancing Floor"^{†}	Bill Sellars	Brian Hayles	16 April 1966	Y	9.4	44
24	7	The Celestial Toymaker	"The Final Test"	Bill Sellars	Brian Hayles	23 April 1966	Y	7.8	43
The TARDIS lands in the domain of the Toymaker, an eternal being of infinite power who sets games and traps for the unwary to become his playthings. The Toymaker abducts the Doctor to his study, where he is given the Trilogic Game, a ten-piece puzzle whose pieces must all be moved and remounted in a 1,023-move sequence. Steven and Dodo face different childish challenges: two clowns are transformed into dolls after losing at blind man's buff; the King and Queen of Hearts are trapped when sitting on a chair which folds in on them; they find a thimble which opens the exit door inside Mrs. Wiggs's large pie; they free themselves from two dancing ballerinas by swapping their partners for each other; and they win at hopscotch against Cyril, who slips on a triangle he has booby-trapped and is electrocuted. At the final stage of the Trilogic Game, the Doctor sends Steven and Dodo into the TARDIS. He realises that, upon making the last move and winning, the Toymaker's domain will disappear along with the TARDIS. Using the Toymaker's voice from inside the TARDIS, he orders the last piece to move, departing while the Toymaker's world is destroyed.
25	8	The Gunfighters	"A Holiday for the Doctor"	Rex Tucker	Donald Cotton	30 April 1966	Z	6.5	45
25	8	The Gunfighters	"Don't Shoot the Pianist"	Rex Tucker	Donald Cotton	7 May 1966	Z	6.6	39
25	8	The Gunfighters	"Johnny Ringo"	Rex Tucker	Donald Cotton	14 May 1966	Z	6.2	36
25	8	The Gunfighters	"The O.K. Corral"	Rex Tucker	Donald Cotton	21 May 1966	Z	5.7	30
The TARDIS arrives in Tombstone, Arizona, where local marshal Wyatt Earp offers the travellers protection. The Doctor finds the dentist, Doc Holliday. The Clanton brothers suspect the Doctor is Holliday and invite him to a hotel. Holliday is initially happy to let him be shot in his place, but Kate intervenes to save the Doctor. Holliday hides upstairs at the hotel, firing his gun to con the Clantons into thinking the Doctor is indeed Holliday. Wyatt and Sheriff Bat Masterson take the Doctor into custody for his own protection, but he is eventually freed and told to leave town. Dodo falls in with Kate and Holliday, who both plan to leave town and take her with them. The Doctor and Steven return to the saloon in search of Dodo and encounter Johnny Ringo. Steven and Kate are taken by Ringo to the Clanton ranch, where the Clantons tell their father that they killed Warren. Wyatt swears vengeance and starts to build a posse of lawmen. Holliday returns to Tombstone with Dodo and offers his services to Wyatt. The Doctor is unable to prevent a gunfight at the O.K. Corral; Ringo and the three Clantons are shot dead.
26	9	The Savages	"Episode 1"^{†}	Christopher Barry	Ian Stuart Black	28 May 1966	AA	4.8	48
26	9	The Savages	"Episode 2"^{†}	Christopher Barry	Ian Stuart Black	4 June 1966	AA	5.6	49
26	9	The Savages	"Episode 3"^{†}	Christopher Barry	Ian Stuart Black	11 June 1966	AA	5.0	48
26	9	The Savages	"Episode 4"^{†}	Christopher Barry	Ian Stuart Black	18 June 1966	AA	4.5	48
In the far future, the TARDIS materialises on a distant planet inhabited by an advanced civilisation known as the Elders and bands of roaming savages. The Elders welcome the Doctor, revealing they have admired his exploits from afar. The Doctor becomes suspicious of their seemingly perfect civilisation, and Dodo finds their secret: they are only able to maintain their energy by draining the life force of the helpless savages. The Doctor tries to stop the Elders but he is forced into the transfer device and his life force is channelled into the Elders' leader, Jano. The plan backfires Jano is imbued him with the Doctor's mannerisms, outlook, and morality. Dodo and Steven make contact with the savages, the remnants of a once highly skilled race whose ability were stymied over the centuries by the energy transfer process. They help the Doctor escape the city. The Doctor realises the Elders must be forced, not persuaded, to change their ways. His mixed personality convinces Jano to help the savages. The technology underpinning the society is destroyed, and the groups begin discussing how a new society can be built together. The Doctor convinces Steven to remain behind as a mediator.
27	10	The War Machines	"Episode 1"	Michael Ferguson	Ian Stuart Black	25 June 1966	BB	5.4	49
27	10	The War Machines	"Episode 2"	Michael Ferguson	Ian Stuart Black	2 July 1966	BB	4.7	45
27	10	The War Machines	"Episode 3"	Michael Ferguson	Ian Stuart Black	9 July 1966	BB	5.3	44
27	10	The War Machines	"Episode 4"	Michael Ferguson	Ian Stuart Black	16 July 1966	BB	5.5	39
The TARDIS lands in London, near the Post Office Tower, where the Doctor and Dodo, meet Professor Brett, the creator of the supercomputer WOTAN. In four days, WOTAN will be linked to other major computers across the world to take them over. Dodo and Brett's secretary Polly meet Ben Jackson at a nightclub, while the Doctor attends a meeting about WOTAN. WOTAN hypnotises Brett and the Tower's security chief, and Dodo. WOTAN enlists a workforce to construct twelve robotic War Machines around London. The Doctor breaks WOTAN's control over Dodo sends her away to recover. Ben discovers a fully assembled War Machine and learns they will attack the next day. Ben is detected but the hypnotised Polly lets him leave. The War Machine attacks an army task force but stops when faced by the Doctor, having not been completely programmed. The Doctor traps another Machine in an electromagnetic forcefield and reprograms it to destroy WOTAN, halting the other ten Machines and breaking the hypnosis. Dodo decides to stay in London, and Ben and Polly enter the TARDIS as it dematerialises.

^†: Episode is missing

== Production ==
=== Development ===
In December 1964, Doctor Who's producer, Verity Lambert sent a memo to the BBC's head of serials, Donald Wilson, requesting that the programme take a break in July and August 1965, following the transmission of its second season, as it performed worse in that period; Wilson disagreed, wanting the second season to run longer. A month later, Wilson proposed that Doctor Who should continue indefinitely, with a planned nine-week production break between the second and third seasons; ultimately, the break was delayed and lasted six weeks. The third season opened with five episodes—the four-part Galaxy 4 and the singular "Mission to the Unknown"—that were created as part of the programme's second production block and held for transmission. Although Lambert was credited as producer for Galaxy 4, her successor—John Wiles, who had joined the programme in early June 1965—was effectively responsible for the show during its production. "Mission to the Unknown" was the final story for which Lambert was credited.

Wiles and Donald Tosh, the programme's new story editor after Dennis Spooner's departure, immediately developed a positive working relationship. When a six-part serial was extended to become the twelve-part The Daleks' Master Plan, an unhappy Wiles threatened to resign; Tosh, also unhappy, persuaded him to stay. By the end of the serial's production in January 1966, both men had submitted their resignations, Wiles partly due to his strained relationship with Hartnell and desire to return to writing and directing, and Tosh partly out of loyalty to Wiles and desire to do other work. Tosh had also discovered that the vision of Wiles's replacement, Innes Lloyd, differed from his own. The Massacre was Tosh's final credited work, though he remained during production of The Ark, which was Wiles's last credited work as producer. Lloyd shadowed Wiles during filming for The Ark, and The Celestial Toymaker was his first credit on the programme.

=== Casting ===
William Hartnell's contract to portray the programme's protagonist, the First Doctor, was renewed on 24 May 1965, covering six serials in the third season; this was amended to five serials on 23 June, reflecting the extension of the six-part The Daleks' Master Plan to twelve parts. Neither contract applies to the single story "Mission to the Unknown", for which Hartnell is credited (as specified in his contract) but does not appear. Hartnell's relationship with Wiles was poor; he was upset by Lambert's departure. Further upset came from the death of Hartnell's aunt Bessie, the only person from his childhood to whom he was close; the production schedule prevented him from attending her funeral. Hartnell had a dual role in The Massacre, as the Doctor and the Abbot of Amboise. He was largely absent from a later serial, The Celestial Toymaker, while on holiday; as his contract was due to expire during the serial, the production team considered replacing him with a different actor when he reappeared, partly due to Hartnell's fragile health and conflict with the team; however, before this could be enacted, Hartnell's contract was renewed on 15 February 1966, seeing him through to the end of the third production block, covering the rest of the third season and the first two serials of the fourth.

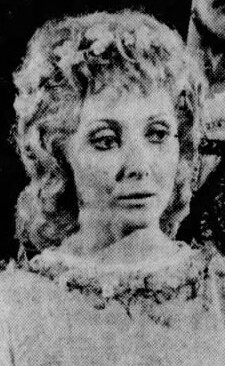
Maureen O'Brien

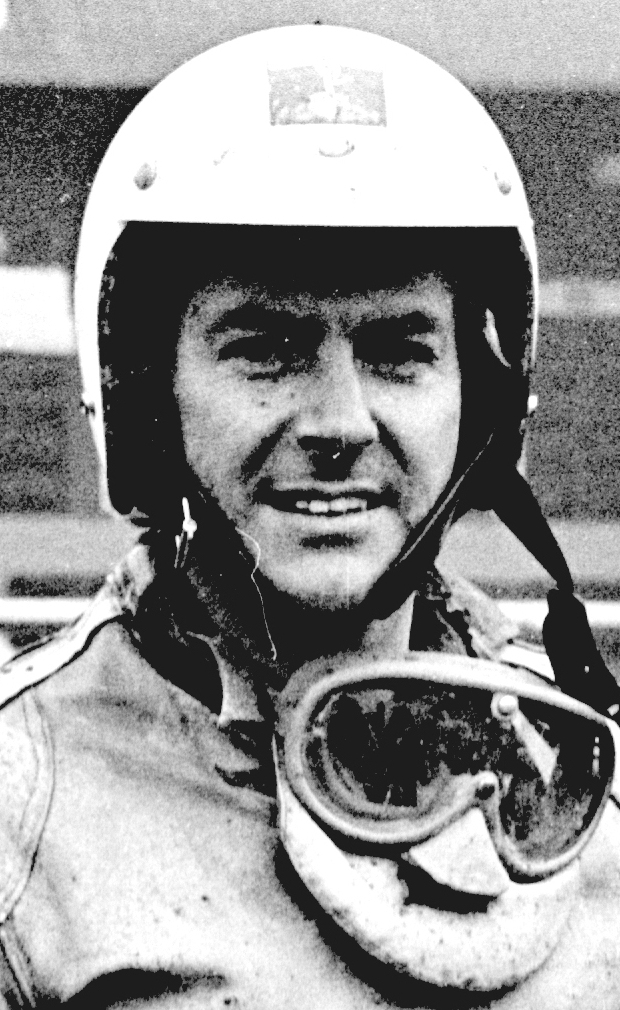
Peter Purves

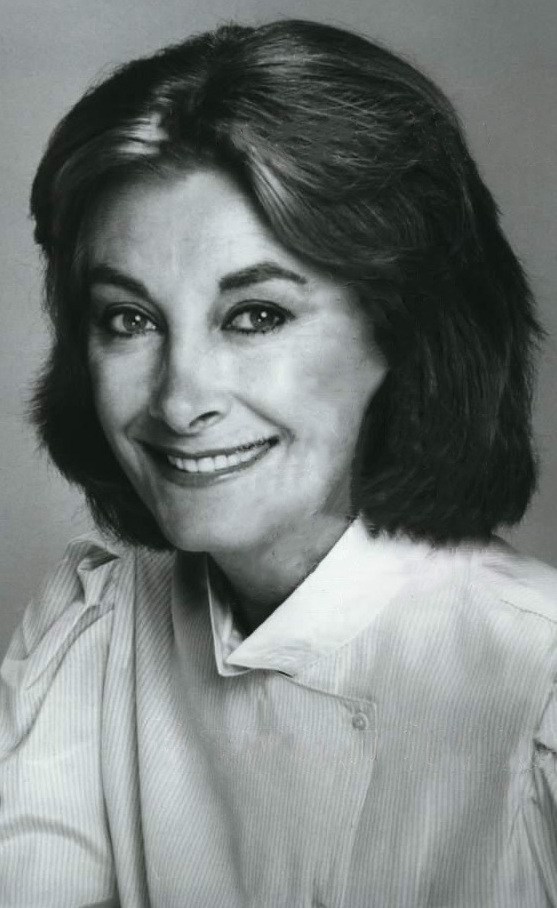
Jean Marsh

The third season saw the departures of O'Brien and Purves as Vicki and Steven. Several other cast members were subsequently introduced and removed, including Marsh as Sara Kingdom.

The season saw several changes for other lead cast members. Maureen O'Brien and Peter Purves, who portrayed Vicki and Steven Taylor, were contracted on 21 May 1965 until the end of The Myth Makers. Wiles later decided to renew Purves's contract for a further 20 episodes (to the end of The Ark) but not O'Brien's, having witnessed arguments regarding her dialogue in rehearsals for Galaxy 4; he informed them on 3 September. O'Brien was shocked, as she had returned from holiday expecting to maintain the job, though she was ultimately glad to move on as she had disliked the role and scripts. Adrienne Hill was contracted on 9 September to replace O'Brien as Katarina in five episodes. Wiles and Tosh decided that Katarina would be killed in The Daleks' Master Plan for shock value, as writers of subsequent stories faced difficulty fitting her in. Hill's first work on the series was recording Katarina's death scene.

Hill was replaced by Jean Marsh as Sara Kingdom, who was also killed in the serial's climax. Katarina and Sara were the first companions to be killed in Doctor Who. Marsh was contracted on 14 September; she had previously played Joanna in the second-season serial The Crusade, for which Hill had been considered. O'Brien's departure and Hill and Marsh's casting were announced on 2 November. The frequent cast changes left Purves worried for his role; he felt he might be replaced by Nicholas Courtney, who was cast as Bret Vyon in The Daleks' Master Plan on 14 September; Courtney returned in the 1968 serial The Web of Fear to play Brigadier Lethbridge Stewart, who later became a prominent recurring character in Doctor Who. The first candidate to replace Katarina and Sara in The Massacre was Anne Chaplet, a servant girl destined for death before being saved by Steven. Tosh and Wiles were cautious of introducing a historical companion after difficulties writing for Katarina. The script was rewritten to introduce Anne's descendant, Dodo, as the new companion, with similar character traits. Jackie Lane was cast as Dodo on 29 December 1965.

Purves departed the series in The Savages. Purves and Hartnell were sad to end their working relationship; the former had learned much from their time together. Lloyd told Purves about Steven's departure after filming the second episode of The Ark on 25 February 1966, the day after his contract had been renewed until the end of The Savages. Purves compared the sudden news of his departure to those Hill and O'Brien; He said "no-one felt secure in the show at all" at the time. Lane departed in the following serial, The War Machines; Lloyd said the characters were difficult to write due to their fictional backgrounds. He wanted two contemporary companions to make the programme relatable, partly inspired by the popularity of the James Bond films and The Man from U.N.C.L.E.; Ben and Polly are 24-year-olds from Swinging London, the former an able seaman with the Royal Navy and the latter an intelligent but impulsive woman with trendy outfits. Anneke Wills and Michael Craze were cast as Polly and Ben by early May and offered contracts for four serials (18 episodes) on 25 and 26 May, respectively. They subsequently became lifelong friends.

=== Writing ===
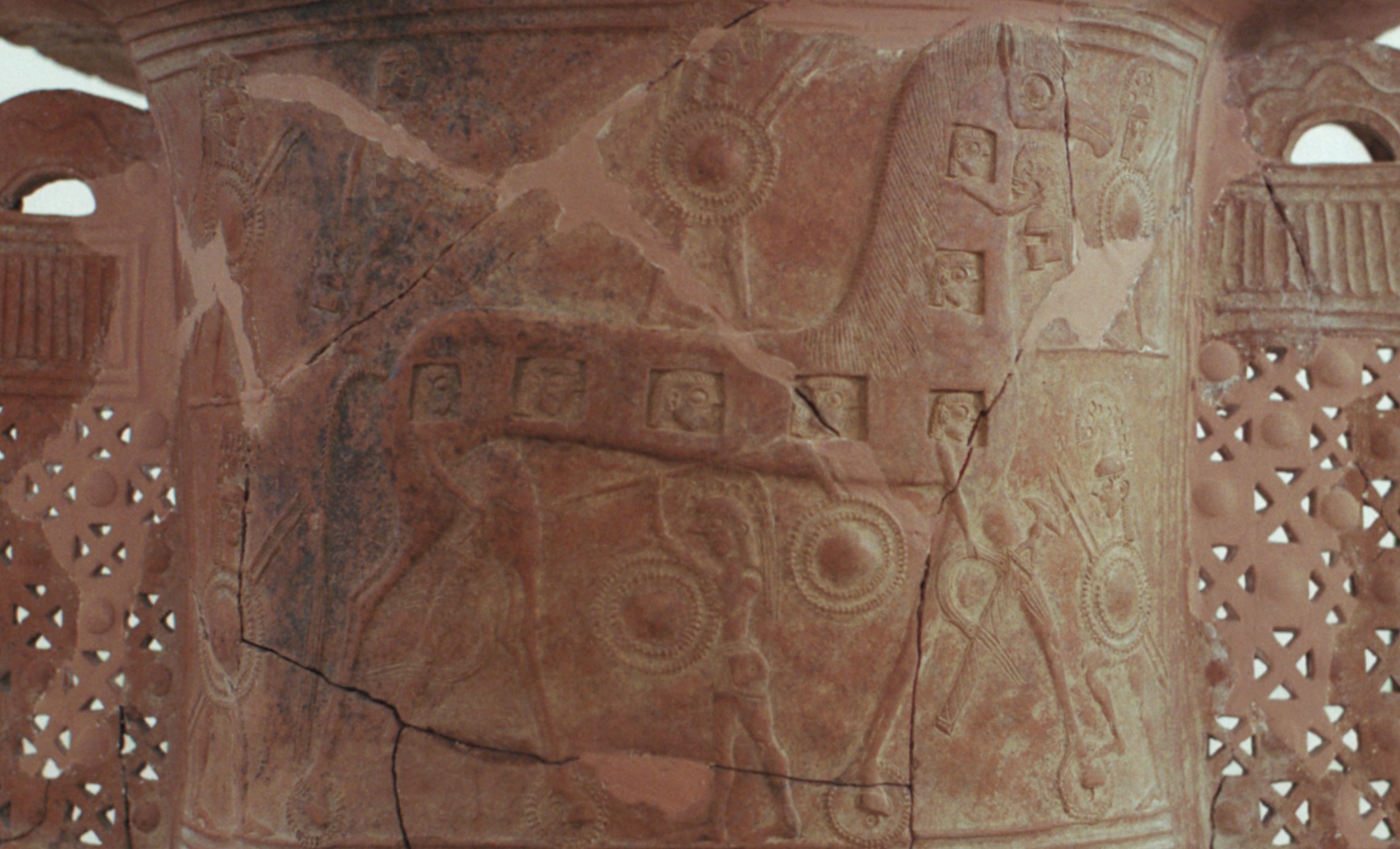
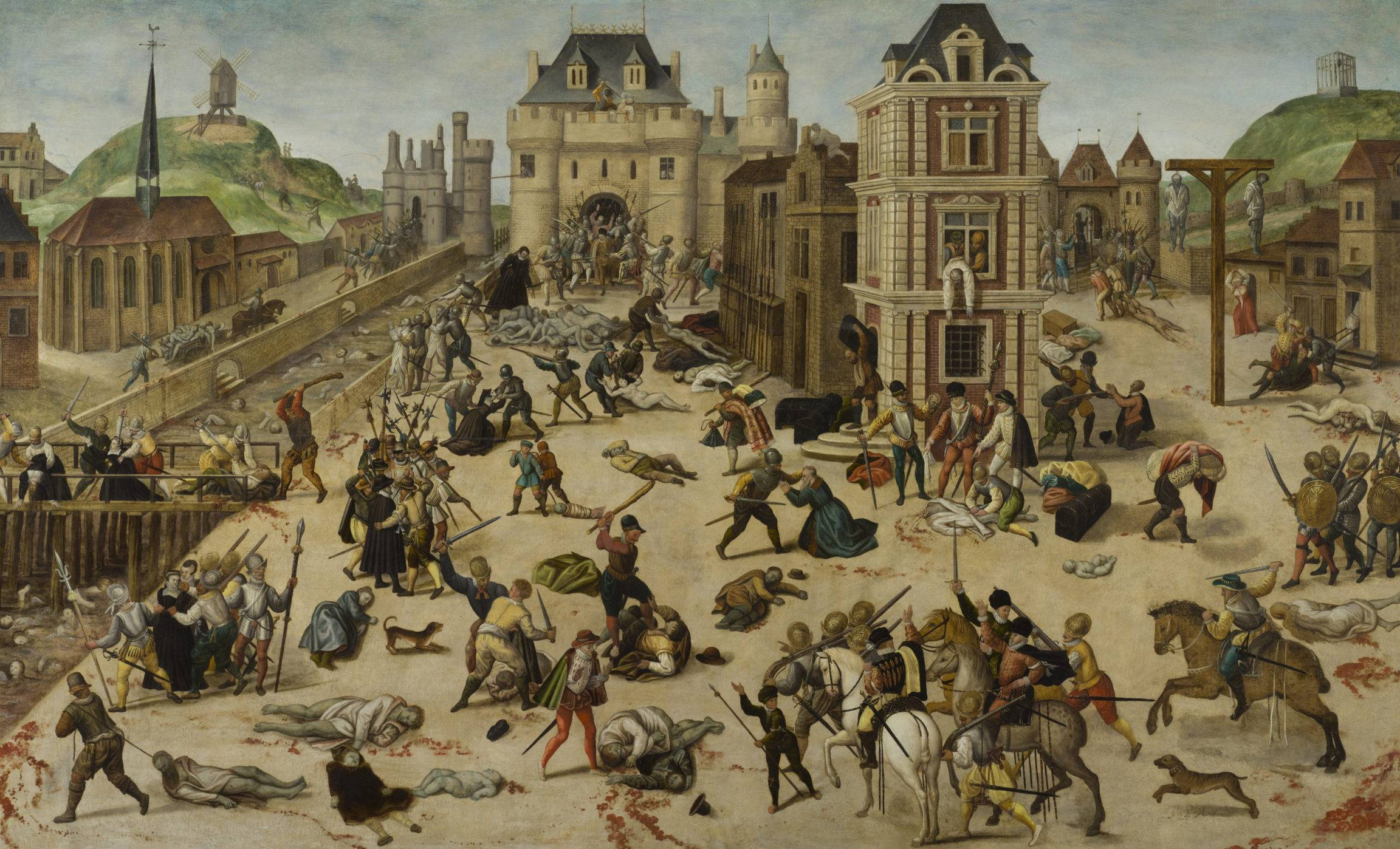
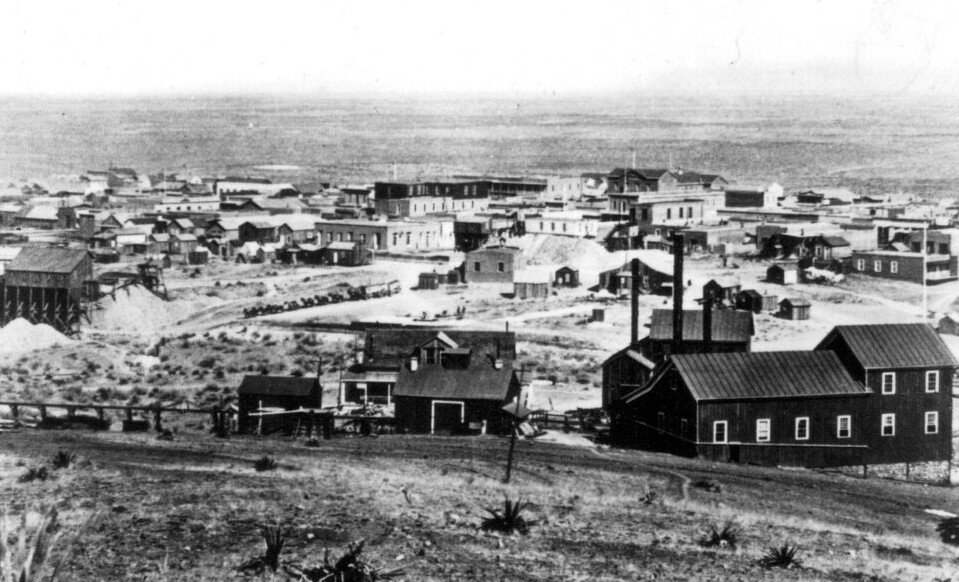
Following stories set during the Trojan War, St. Bartholomew's Day massacre, and gunfight at the O.K. Corral, the producers phased out historical serials in favour of contemporary science-fiction.

The third season begins with serials carried over from Lambert and Spooner's leadership, including the twelve-part The Daleks' Master Plan, followed by eclectic and cerebral stories under Wiles and Tosh, who treated historical stories both as a dramatic device (The Massacre) and with irreverence (The Myth Makers and The Gunfighters). Many of their later stories were altered by their successors, Lloyd and Davis. Schoolteacher-turned-screenwriter William Emms, a science-fiction fan and avid Doctor Who viewer, wrote Galaxy 4, wanting to show two conflicting races and flip convention by making the beautiful race evil. Though it was commissioned by Spooner, Tosh handled the bulk of the rewrites. Emms disliked the amendments, and the cast were unhappy with the scripts. Tosh wanted Doctor Who to expand creatively, such as experimenting with horror and humour elements within historical stories. He and Wiles wanted the programme to move away from "childish" science fantasy and towards historical stories and adult science-fiction. Invited by Tosh, Donald Cotton submitted a story idea, The Myth Makers, about Greek mythology, having written similar pieces for BBC Third Programme. He felt the Trojan Horse was "almost certainly completely myth" but found it compelling to include with the Doctor's involvement.

Spooner asked Terry Nation in early 1965 to write a six-part serial featuring the Daleks. Tosh commissioned the serial, which was soon expanded to twelve episodes with Nation and Spooner sharing writing duties. To compensate for scheduling changes, an additional episode was added to the schedule, written by Nation; it became "Mission to the Unknown", a cutaway to set up the twelve-part The Daleks' Master Plan. Tosh commissioned Nation to write the first six episodes, and Spooner to write the remaining six; they swapped the sixth and seventh, allowing each to write a cliffhanger for the other to resolve. The seventh episode's broadcast on Christmas Day prompted the production team to write a self-contained comedic story. The Doctor's address to the audience at the end of the episode was written in the camera script, though Tosh and Wiles claimed it was improvised by Hartnell; Tosh felt it broke the audience's suspension of disbelief.

Spooner verbally agreed that John Lucarotti, who had written for the first season, could write a Vikings serial for the third. After Spooner's departure, Tosh approved Lucarotti's idea, but days later rejected the story. Wiles wanted the series to explore a religious conflict with the Doctor witnessing rather than interfering; Tosh suggested the St. Bartholomew's Day massacre, and Lucarotti was commissioned for The Massacre. Tosh made several edits to the scripts over two weeks to adhere to documented history. Lucarotti asked for his name to be removed due to the extensive rewrites, though his agent dissuaded him. Tosh was credited as co-writer, and Lucarotti considered him the serial's author. For The Ark, Wiles conceived of a story set on an interstellar ark. Tosh developed a storyline with Paul Erickson, who wrote the scripts. Erickson's agent requested that the writer credit be amended to add Lesley Scott, Erickson's then-partner, as co-writer without fee; the scripts' original copyright is attributed solely to Erickson, and in later years he refused to comment on the credit, referring to it as a "personal arrangement". Scott was the first woman to receive a writing credit on Doctor Who.

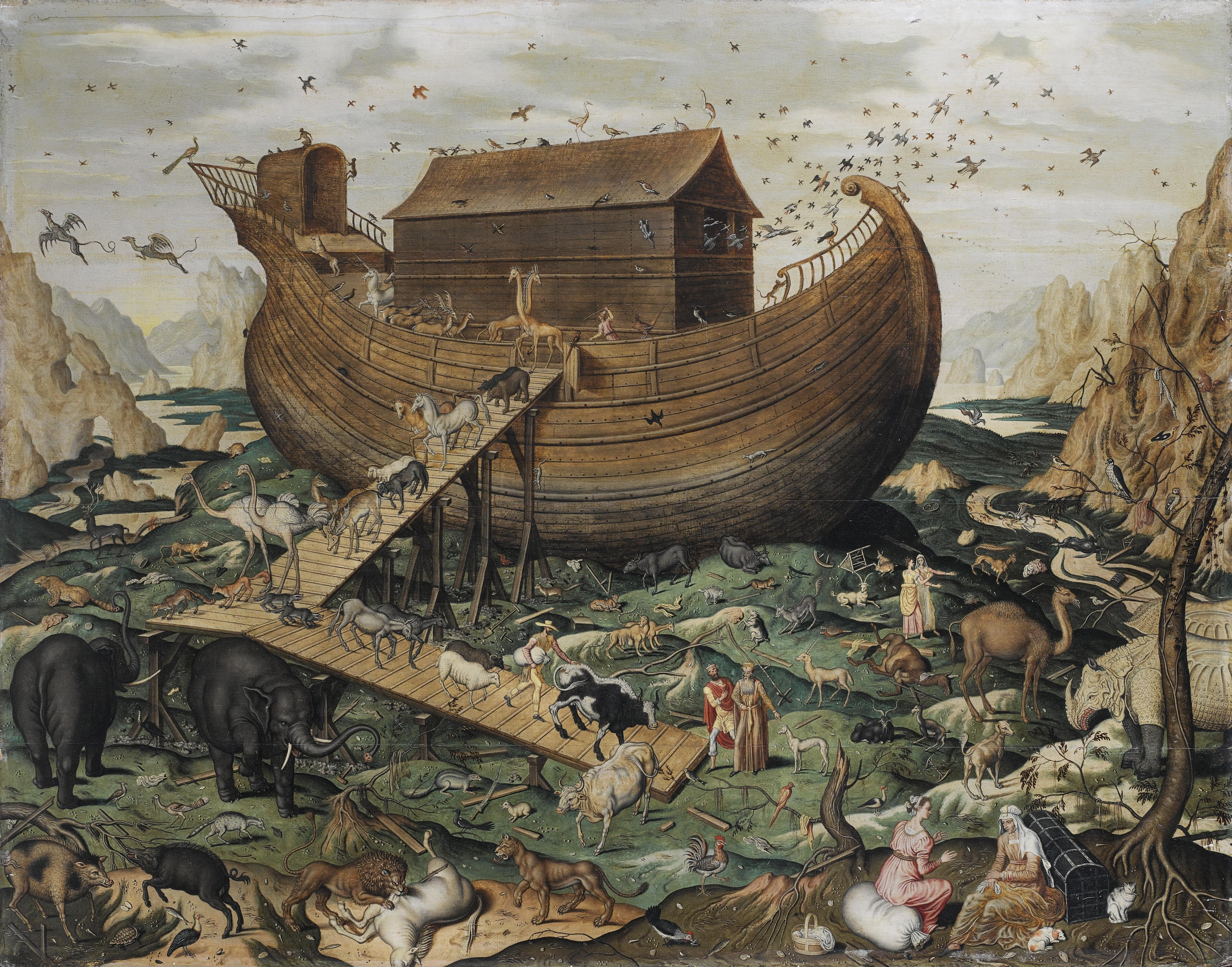
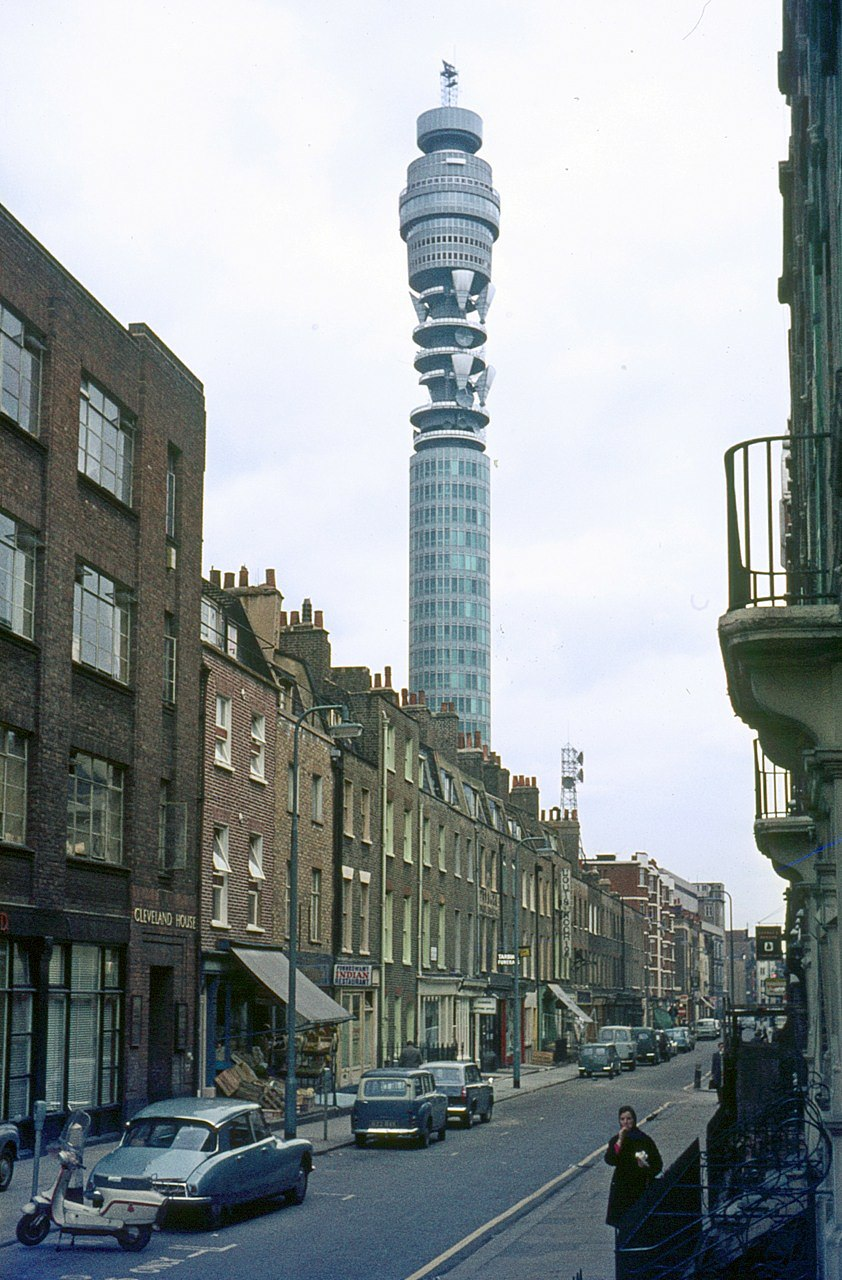
The Ark is inspired by the Biblical narrative of Noah's Ark, and The War Machines centres on the recently constructed Post Office Tower in London.

Freelance writer Brian Hayles submitted several story ideas in 1965, including one that became The Celestial Toymaker. Tosh and Wiles sought several changes to Hayles's scripts to fit within the programme's means, themes, and budget; busy with other work, Hayles allowed Tosh to redevelop the scripts. After becoming story editor, Davis rewrote much of the scripts over four days. Tosh and Wiles disapproved, though Hayles told Davis he was happy with the final scripts; he received the sole writing credit after Tosh asked to be removed. After working on The Myth Makers, Cotton was commissioned to write The Gunfighters, about the gunfight at the O.K. Corral. Cotton favoured fictional depictions and made some alterations to the real events. Tosh wanted the serial to parody American Western films.

The season's last two serials were written by Ian Stuart Black, who approached the production office while working on a neighbouring series. For The Savages, Black wanted to appeal to the audience's reasoning, rather than including violence and action, conceiving a story in which humans' energies were absorbed to power an artistic civilisation. For The War Machines, wanting to phase out historical serials in favour of contemporary science-fiction, Davis sought a scientific consultant for the programme; he wrote an outline with Kit Pedler, who conceived of a rogue computer taking over the Post Office Tower. Scriptwriting duties for the story were assigned to Pat Dunlop; he asked to be removed due to other work, and Davis subsequently assigned it to Black. He was granted additional time to accommodate Davis and Lloyd's changes to the companions. The War Machines was Davis and Lloyd's first original story, having adopted the preceding serials from their predecessors.

=== Filming ===
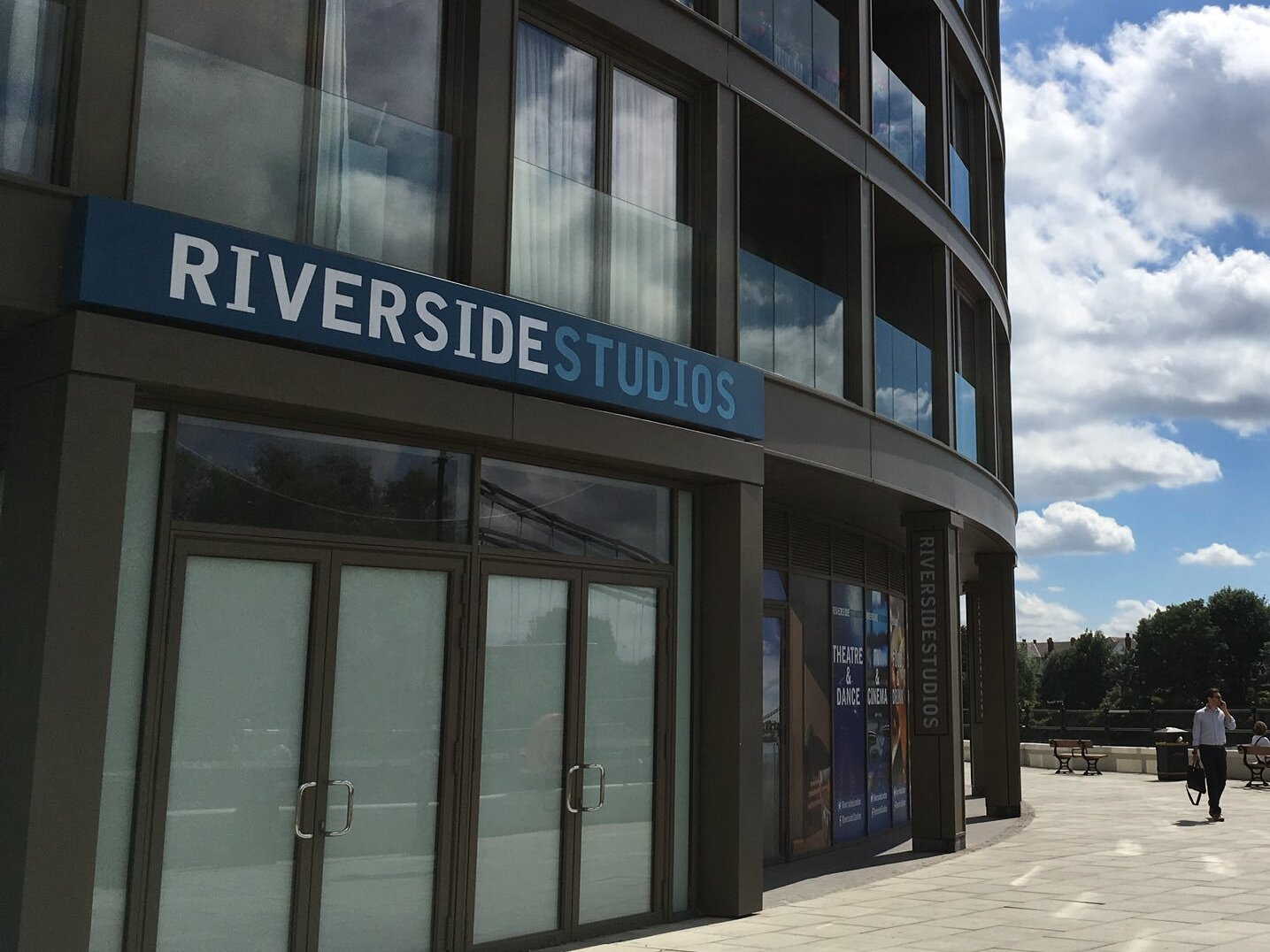
Riverside Studios, 2018

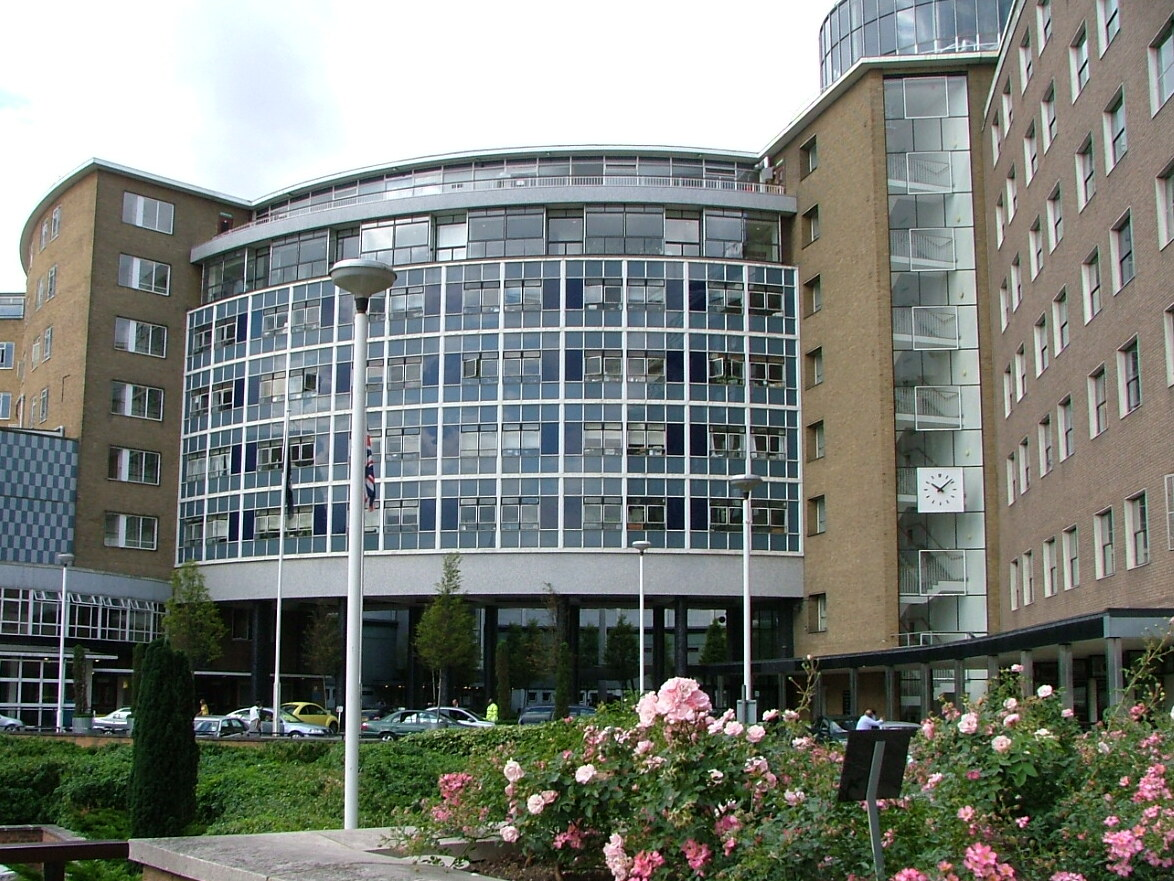
Television Centre, 2005

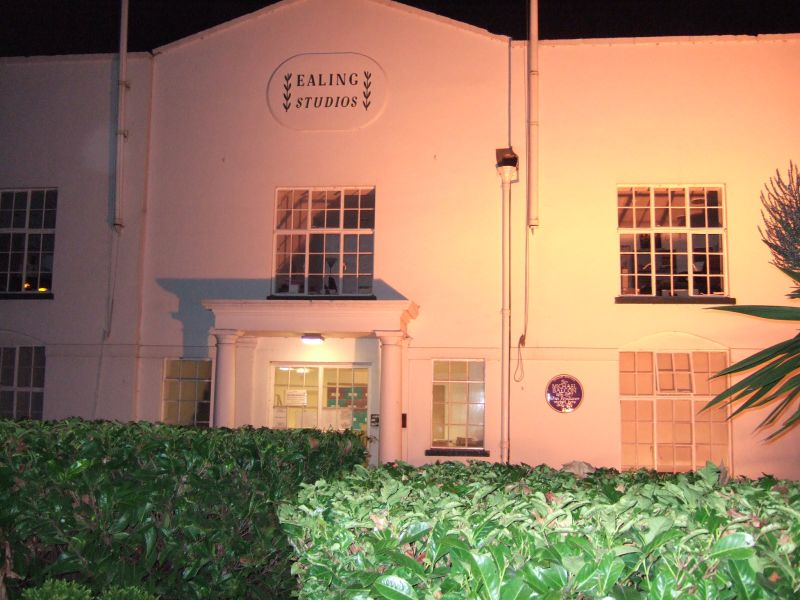
Ealing Studios, 2008

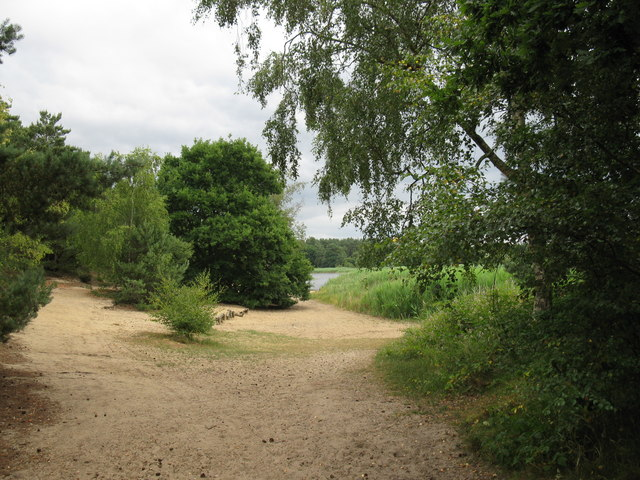
Frensham Common, 2009

Six third-season serials were recorded at Riverside, three at the Television Centre, and one at both. Ealing was used to film model inserts in all stories except The Myth Makers, which used Frensham.

The third season's first five episodes were created as part of the programme's second production block, immediately following the second season. Mervyn Pinfield was assigned to direct all five—the four-part Galaxy 4 and the standalone "Mission to the Unknown"—as part of a single production block. Soon after production commenced, Pinfield's failing health prevented him from continuing; he worked alongside his replacement, Derek Martinus, for the first week. A week of filming took place at Ealing Studios on 21–25 June 1965, largely for Galaxy 4's effects. Weekly recording took place from 9 to 30 July 1965 in Studio 4 of the Television Centre and cost a total of £9,950 (equivalent to £168,454 in 2025). Pre-filming for "Mission to the Unknown" took place on 25 June at Ealing, and the episode was recorded in Television Centre's Studio TC4 on 6 August, costing £2,440 (£41,309 in 2025). It was the last episode of the second production block and was followed by a six-week break.

Martinus was discussed as a possible director of The Myth Makers, though the role was ultimately assigned to BBC staff director Michael Leeston-Smith. It was his only work for the programme. The third production block began with early model filming at Frensham Ponds, close to Leeston-Smith's home, on 27 August; some scenes were refilmed from 30 August to 2 September. The serial was recorded weekly from 17 September to 8 October at Studio 1 of Riverside Studios, costing a total of £10,214 (£172,924 in 2025). Douglas Camfield was assigned to direct The Daleks' Master Plan; Tosh persuaded Wiles to maintain Camfield as the sole director after the serial was extended to twelve episodes, and felt Camfield's work on the scripts made the serial a success. Early filming took place at Ealing from 27 September to 8 October, with some remounts on 18 and 21 October. Weekly recording occurred from 22 October 1965 to 14 January 1966, except the week of 20 December due to the Christmas break. recording for the twelve episodes cost a total of £31,596 (£534,923 in 2025). Exhausted from production, Camfield decided he would not return to direct Doctor Who for some time.

Paddy Russell was assigned to direct The Massacre—the first woman to direct Doctor Who. Early filming took place on Stages 3A and 3B of the Television Film Studios from 3 to 7 January 1966, followed by weekly recording at Riverside Studio from 21 January to 11 February, costing £10,268 (£173,838 in 2025). Michael Imison, who had known Wiles since their time as story editors, was assigned to direct The Ark, his only work on Doctor Who. He worked with Erickson to revise the scripts, which he had found uninspiring He wanted the serial to be impressive, creating complex storyboards and camera scripts; he later said he was likely "deliberately trying to show off". Early filming took place at Ealing from 31 January to 4 February; Several animals were used for filming in the studio, including a baby Indian elephant, who was kept in a van outside Imison's home the night before filming as the BBC did not allow the driver to park at the studio. Weekly recording took place in Studio 1 of Riverside from on 18 February to 11 March, and cost a total of £11,159 (£188,923 in 2025).

Bill Sellars was assigned to direct The Celestial Toymaker. Early filming took place at Ealing on 2 and 3 March 1966, and weekly recording took place in Riverside's Studio 1 from 18 March to 8 April. The serial had a limited budget, ultimately costing £9,386 (£158,906 in 2025), due to the expensive production of The Ark; the fourth episode is the cheapest Doctor Who episode ever recorded. Rex Tucker, who had worked as the programme's "de factor producer" during its creation in 1963, was assigned to direct The Gunfighters. Early filming took place on Ealing's Stages 3A and 3B from 28 to 31 March 1966; it had originally been scheduled at Riverside but Ealing was considered more suitable for horses. Weekly recording occurred from 15 April to 6 May; the first episode was recorded at Television Centre's Studio 4 and the rest at Riverside's Studio 1 as planned. A small crew filmed the final scene at the Callow Hill Sandpit in Virginia Water, Surrey, on 1 May. Recording cost a total of £10,415 (£176,327 in 2025). Due to disagreements with Lloyd's editing, Tucker requested that his directorial credit be removed from the fourth episode.

Christopher Barry, who had directed first- and second-season serials, was assigned to The Savages by Lloyd, an old friend. He cast several guest actors with whom he had worked before. Early filming took place at Ealing from 27 to 28 April and on location in Chalfont St Peter and Esher on 29 April and 1 May, followed by weekly recording in Riverside's Studio 1 from 13 May to 3 June; early fourth-episode scenes were recorded alongside the third, and the serial cost a total of £11,531 (£195,221 in 2025). Michael Ferguson, formerly an assistant floor manager on The Daleks (1963–1964), was assigned to direct The War Machines. He similarly cast several familiar guest actors as the BBC did not use casting directors. Early filming began on 22 May on location in London, at Ealing from 23 to 25 May, and on location on 26 May. Weekly recording took place in Riverside's Studio 1 from 10 June to 1 July, costing £11,612 (£196,592 in 2025). The programme's third production block continued through to the first serial of the fourth season. Recording of the full 45-episode season cost a total of £118,571 (£2,007,419 in 2025).

== Release ==
=== Promotion ===
Galaxy 4's Drahvins were promoted in the Daily Express on 25 June 1965, and Emms was interviewed by publications including the Daily Mail and Daily Sketch. On 30 July, Junior Points of View host Sarah Ward revealed that the third season would premiere on 11 September. Hartnell's episode of Desert Island Discs was broadcast on the BBC Home Service on 23 August, and Radio Times previewed the season on 9 September with an article reintroducing the characters, promoting Galaxy 4, and teasing later stories. Galaxy 4 was promoted in September with photographs in The Daily Telegraph and The Stage and Television Today and a 95-second trailer narrated by Shaw Taylor. Hartnell appeared alongside a Chumbley and the Dalek Supreme at the Farnborough International Airshow on 4 September. The BBC Press Service issued a press release promoting "Mission to the Unknown", concurrent with filming on 6 August, published in several newspapers the following day alongside photographs of Lambert, marking her final work for the programme.

Radio Times promoted "Mission to the Unknown" and The Myth Makers each with half-page features on 7 and 14 October. The first episode of The Daleks' Master Plan received significant press coverage on 23 October with a photocall of the bald actors portraying the Technix. Two trailers—18 and 37 seconds—were created to promote the serial, and Radio Times ran several previews of the episodes, including a half-page illustrated article for the first. Marsh's appearance received press coverage alongside a photocall. Radio Times previewed The Massacre and The Ark in individual articles, the latter alongside a photograph of Monica the elephant, and two Dalek props appeared on the children's programme Blue Peter on 3 March 1966. The Ark was promoted in the Western Daily Press with a photograph of a Monoid holding Lane. Radio Times's article about The Celestial Toymaker focused on the Toymaker and his games.

Hartnell's interview with the Daily Mirror was published on 23 April, focusing on his experience as the Doctor alongside promotion of The Gunfighters, itself the focus of a half-page Radio Times article in April and the front page of the BBC's internal magazine, Ariel, in May. Purves opened a fête for Girl Guides in Frome on 7 May. The Savages received a feature about Ewen Solon's makeup in the Daily Mirror on 23 May and a half-page article in the Radio Times. The War Machines received a similar Radio Times article, with stylised artwork by Victor Reinganum, and was promoted on Blue Peter on 20 June, with hosts Christopher Trace and Valerie Singleton appearing alongside a War Machine prop. The Stage and Television Today printed a publicity shot of Craze and Wills on 7 July to promote their appearance in the following season.

=== Broadcast ===
The third season was broadcast on BBC1 over 45 successive weeks, starting with Galaxy 4 on 11 September 1965 and concluding with The War Machines on 16 July 1966. Each serial consisted of four episodes except for the singular "Mission to the Unknown" and its twelve-part successor, The Daleks' Master Plan. The latter was the longest serial in the show's history until 1986's The Trial of a Time Lord and remains the longest with a single director and production code. (Note: The Trial of a Time Lord (1986) is a fourteen-part serial but was produced as four separate storylines within three production blocks, each with different directors and production codes.) The Gunfighters was the last serial of Doctor Who's original run to have individual episode titles, and "The O.K. Corral" was the last regular episode given an individual title until "Rose" (2005); from The Savages onward, each serial had an overall title divided into numbered parts, which Lloyd felt let viewers know when a new story had started.

Several serials were sold overseas in the late 1960s and early 1970s, including to Australia, Barbados, New Zealand, Sierra Leone, Singapore, and Zambia. The 405-line videotapes of each episode were cleared for wiping in the years following their broadcast, including 26 episodes in 1967, (Note: The following episodes were cleared for wiping in 1967: 17 August 1967: Galaxy 4 episodes 1, 2, and 4; The Myth Makers episodes 2, 3, and 4; The Daleks' Master Plan episodes 1–2, 4–5, and 7–9; all four episodes of The Massacre and The Ark; and The Gunfighters episode 1; 1967: The Savages) and 11 in 1969; (Note: The following episodes were cleared for wiping in 1969: 31 January 1969: Galaxy 4 episode 3; The Myth Makers episode 1; and The Daleks' Master Plan episodes 3 and 6; 17 July 1969: "Mission to the Unknown" and The Daleks' Master Plan episodes 10–12; Before 1970: The Gunfighters episodes 2–4) The War Machines was cleared in March 1974 and The Celestial Toymaker by 1976. In 1978, BBC Enterprises discovered it possessed all four episodes of The Ark, the first third-season serial to still exist in its entirety. The BBC Film and Videotape Library retained a 16 mm print of the fourth episode, and BBC Enterprises's negatives of all four episodes were discovered in the 1970s.

Several episodes were later recovered: the second episode of The War Machines in the late 1970s; the fifth and tenth of The Daleks' Master Plan in 1983; the first of The Celestial Toymaker in 1984; censored versions of The War Machines in 1984; the second of The Daleks' Master Plan in 2004; the third of Galaxy 4 in 2011; and the first and third of The Daleks' Master Plan in 2026. "Mission to the Unknown" and The Massacre are two of three stories (Note: The other is Marco Polo. Seven other serials are completely missing, but some brief clips survive.) of which no known footage survives, and the latter is the only serial with no known visual records, including telesnaps; only audio recordings and production stills survive. The War Machines is Hartnell's last and Polly and Ben's only serial without any missing episodes. Several recovered episodes were screened at the National Film Theatre in the 1980s and broadcast on UK Gold in episodic and omnibus formats in the early 1990s. With 26 missing episodes across seven stories, the third season is the most incomplete of Hartnell's era. (Note: The first season is missing nine episodes across two stories, while the second season is missing two episodes of one story. Of Hartnell's eight fourth season episodes, five are missing.)

=== Home media ===
==== VHS releases ====
Season	Story no.	Serial name	Duration	Release date		
Season	Story no.	Serial name	Duration	UK	Australia	USA / Canada
3	23	The Ark	4 × 25 min.	5 October 1998	February 1999	March 1999
3	21	Daleks: The Early Years; The Daleks' Master Plan (Note: Episodes 5 and 10)	2 × 25 min.	6 July 1992	February 1993	October 1993
3	24	The Hartnell Years (Note: Also includes pilot episode of An Unearthly Child); The Celestial Toymaker (Note: Episode 4)	1 × 35 min. 1 × 25 min.	3 July 1991	May 1992	January 1992
3	25	The Gunfighters	4 × 25 min.	4 November 2002 (Note: Part of The First Doctor: Special Edition Box Set)	December 2002	October 2003
3	27	The War Machines	4 × 25 min.	2 June 1997	January 1998	31 March 1998

==== DVD and Blu-ray releases ====
All releases are for DVD unless otherwise indicated:

- ^{(D,B)} indicates a simultaneous DVD and Blu-ray release

Season	Story no.	Serial name	Duration	Release date		
Season	Story no.	Serial name	Duration	R2 / UK	R4 / AU	R1 / US
1; 3	6, 18	The Aztecs (Special Edition); Galaxy 4 (Note: Episode 3 of 4, condensed reconstruction of episodes 1, 2, and 4)	5 × 25 min.	11 March 2013	20 March 2013	12 March 2013
3	18	Galaxy 4 (Note: All four episodes animated (colour and black and white versions), remastered Episode 3 and "tele-snap" reconstructions)	4 × 25 min.	15 November 2021 ^{(D,B)}	12 January 2022 ^{(D,B)}	5 April 2022
3	21, 24	Lost in Time, Volume 1 The Daleks' Master Plan (Note: Episodes 2, 5, and 10 of 12); The Celestial Toymaker (Note: Episode 4 of 4)	4 × 25 min.	1 November 2004	December 2004 (Note: Re-released on 1 July 2010)	2 November 2004
3	23	The Ark	4 × 25 min.	14 February 2011	3 March 2011	8 March 2011
3	24	The Celestial Toymaker (Note: All four episodes animated (colour and black-and-white versions), remastered Episode 4 and 'tele-snap' reconstructions)	4 × 25 min.	10 June 2024 ^{(D,B)}	4 September 2024 ^{(D,B)}	11 June 2024 ^{(B)}
3	25	The Gunfighters (Note: Only available as part of the Earth Story box set in Regions 2 and 4. Only available individually in Region 1.)	4 × 25 min.	20 June 2011	4 August 2011	12 July 2011
3	26	The Savages (Note: All four episodes animated (colour and black and white versions))	4 × 25 min.	24 March 2025 ^{(D,B)}	4 June 2025 ^{(D,B)}	20 May 2025 ^{(B)}
3	27	The War Machines	4 × 25 min.	25 August 2008	7 November 2008	6 January 2009

=== Books ===
Season	Story no.	Library no. (Note: Number in Target's Doctor Who Library, if applicable)	Novelisation title	Author	Hardcover release date (Note: Published by Target's parent companies (Allen Wingate, W. H. Allen, BBC Books) unless otherwise indicated)	Paperback release date (Note: Published by Target Books (or by BBC Books under the Target Collection umbrella) unless otherwise indicated)	Audiobook	
Season	Story no.	Library no.	Novelisation title	Author	Hardcover release date	Paperback release date	Release date (Note: Unabridged from BBC Audio / AudioGo unless otherwise indicated)	Narrator
3	018	104	Galaxy Four	William Emms	14 November 1985	10 April 1986	6 July 2017	Maureen O'Brien
3	019, 021	141	The Daleks' Master Plan Part I: Mission to the Unknown	John Peel	—N/a	21 September 1989	6 May 2010	Jean Marsh and Peter Purves (Note: Dalek voices performed by Nicholas Briggs)
3	020	97	The Myth Makers	Donald Cotton	11 April 1985	12 September 1985	7 April 2008	Stephen Thorne
3	021	142	The Daleks' Master Plan Part II: The Mutation of Time	John Peel	—N/a	19 October 1989	3 June 2010	Jean Marsh and Peter Purves
3	022	122	The Massacre	John Lucarotti	18 June 1987	19 November 1987	11 June 2015	Peter Purves
3	023	114	The Ark	Paul Erickson	16 October 1986	19 March 1987	1 March 2018	Peter Purves
3	024	111	The Celestial Toymaker	Gerry Davis and Alison Bingeman	19 June 1986	20 November 1986	3 April 2025	Peter Purves
3	025	101	The Gunfighters	Donald Cotton	11 July 1985	9 January 1986	7 February 2013	Shane Rimmer
3	026	109	The Savages	Ian Stuart Black	20 March 1986	11 September 1986	4 February 2021	Peter Purves
3	027	136	The War Machines	Ian Stuart Black	—N/a	16 February 1989	7 March 2019	Michael Cochrane

== Reception ==
=== Ratings ===
Viewers per episode (millions)
Audience measurement performed by Broadcasters' Audience Research Board

The 45-episode third season saw an average of 7.65 million viewers. Galaxy 4 was considered a strong start, with higher viewership than in the previous year; it averaged 9.9 million viewers across the four weeks, with the third episode becoming the most-viewed of the show's third season with 11 million viewers. Viewership dropped for "Mission to the Unknown" and The Myth Makers, though it was comparable to Planet of Giants (1964), which had aired around the same time the previous year. The Myth Makers received an average of 8.35 million viewers across its four weeks. This saw an increase with The Daleks' Master Plan, which averaged 9.35 million, though it did not match the previous year's figures; the third episode received the most with 10.3 million viewers, while the seventh was lowest with 7.9 million.

Weekly viewership declined during The Massacre; the second episode saw a drop of two million viewers. It marked the second time (Note: After The Sensorites's fourth episode in 1964) that the series received fewer than six million viewers since the second episode in 1963, and its third time (Note: After The Sensorites's fourth episode in 1964 and The Daleks' Master Plan's Christmas episode in 1965) outside the top 50, falling low in the top 100; this was the start of a trend for the series throughout the year and decade. (Note: More than half of the 102 episodes preceding The Massacre exceeded nine million viewers; of the 147 episodes that followed, only two did so.) The fourth episode was Doctor Who's lowest viewing figures since its first episode in 1963, indicating a near-three million drop from The Daleks' Master Plan. The first episode of The Ark received lower viewership, marking the first time since the first episode in 1963 that Doctor Who failed to chart in the week's top 100 programmes. Viewership increased, up to 6.9 million for the second episode and 7.3 million for the fourth, the programme's highest viewership in the preceding two months.

Viewership continued to increase during The Celestial Toymaker: 8 million viewers for the first two episodes and 9.4 million for the third. The fourth episode dropped to 7.4 million, marking the beginning of the programme's collapse in ratings, which lasted for five months until Hartnell's departure. The Gunfighters saw a significant drop as expected, as the programme entered the summer months. There was a myth that it had Doctor Who's lowest-ever viewership figures; its 6.25 million viewer average was the season's lowest to date, but the following two serials dropped further. The Savages partially regained its audience share but overall viewership remained low, with a season-low average of 4.975 million and a nadir of 4.5 million for the fourth—the lowest figure since the programme's first episode. The War Machines saw an improvement, with an average of 5.225 million, though its charts positions were low in comparison to the preceding year.

=== Critical response ===
The Appreciation Index scores remained mostly reasonable and largely consistent throughout the season, averaging 49; it peaked at 57 for the final part of The Daleks' Master Plan, while the fourth episode of The Gunfighters received Doctor Who's lowest ever score with 30. Viewers and BBC executives found serials like The Myth Makers and The Daleks' Master Plan too violent, though others rebuked the sentiment. Audiences enjoyed the Daleks' return in early episodes of the latter, though interest began waning later, and public obsession with the Daleks subsequently declined. Several viewers were confused by the placement of The Myth Makers between "Mission to the Unknown" and The Daleks' Master Plan. The Celestial Toymaker and The Gunfighters have been reevaluated over time, particularly after their recoveries and home media releases; the former's reputation has decreased over time, while the latter—often considered among the worst stories of Hartnell's era and the programme overall—has improved. Several Audience Research Reports for later serials received mixed responses, largely enjoying performances but criticising the concepts. Doctor Who Magazine (DWM) readers consistently ranked most serials within the lower half of Doctor Who stories, though The Massacre is usually placed in the top half and The Daleks' Master Plan among Hartnell's top three; the season overall averaged among the bottom. (Note: Doctor Who Magazine's readers' average scores for the third season were 63% in 1998 (23rd of 26) and 64% in 2009 (24th of 30).)

Reviewers considered Galaxy 4's story interesting and entertaining but flawed; John Kenneth Muir lauded its intelligent philosophy. "Mission to the Unknown" was considered a tense and sinister prologue to The Daleks' Master Plan, which itself received applause for its scope despite some criticism for its length; The Independent's Kim Newman considered it "the most ambitious serial ever attempted by Doctor Who". The violent deaths of the two female companions received critical commentary. Reviewers praised The Myth Makers's sophisticated writing, which some compared to The Romans (1965); David J. Howe and Stephen James Walker enjoyed Vicki's "poignant" departure. Paul Cornell, Martin Day, and Keith Topping of The Discontinuity Guide named The Massacre "arguably the best ever Doctor Who story", lauding the mature and serious character deaths. Several reviewers enjoyed The Ark's use of time travel to revisit the same location and highlight the consequences of the protagonists' actions, and appreciated the ambition and surrealism of The Celestial Toymaker, though some found it dull in execution. The poor contemporary response towards The Gunfighters resulted in historical Doctor Who stories being phased out, despite retrospective applause for its comedy. Several scholars highlighted The Savages's anti-colonialist and pro-democratic themes, and reviewers liked Steven's departure. Critics enjoyed The War Machines's contemporary setting and found its depiction of a supercomputer forward-thinking, though many considered Dodo's departure the worst of any companion and felt Lane was denied a proper exit.

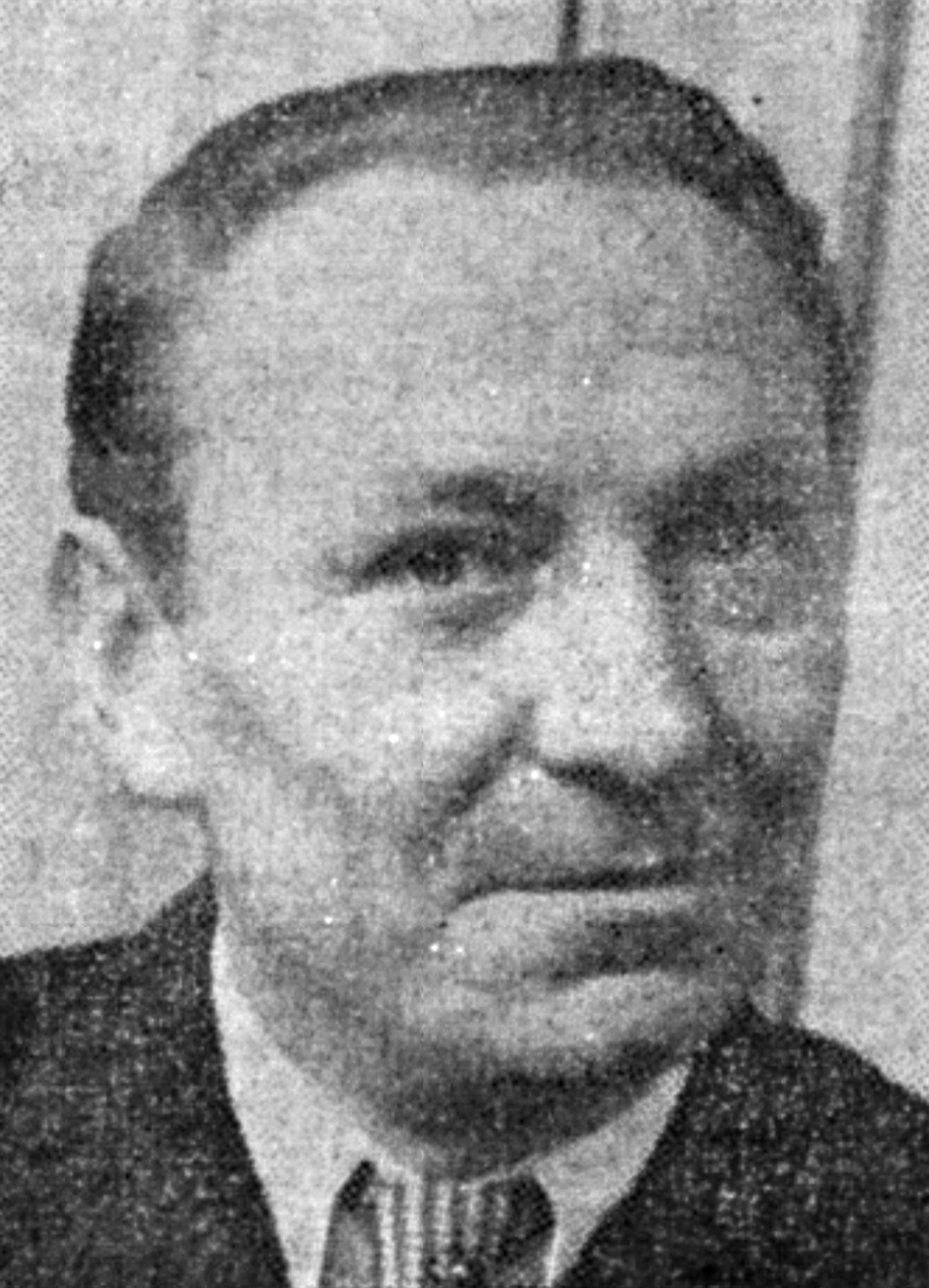
Critics praised William Hartnell for his ongoing role as the First Doctor.

Hartnell's role as the Doctor throughout the season was often praised: Radio Times's Mark Braxton felt The Daleks' Master Plan was among his best; many lauded his dual role and closing monologue in The Massacre and his comedic performance in The Gunfighters, which DWM's Gary Gillatt called "one of his finest performances"; DWM's Jamie Lenman similarly lauded his "bursts of fiery indignation" in The Savages as "amongst his finest", and his role in The War Machines, especially in the third episode's cliffhanger, was lauded for his "iconic hero shot". Purves was similarly lauded for his lead role, including in Hartnell's absence in The Celestial Toymaker. Hill and Marsh's performances in The Daleks' Master Plan were praised, and Kevin Stoney's role as Mavic Chen was lauded despite some questioning whether his name and make-up were a problematic depiction of yellowface. Michael Gough was lauded as the Toymaker; Howe and Walker considered the character to be the serial's "greatest legacy to the Doctor Who universe". Wills and Craze were praised for their naturalistic performances.

The serials' directors often received acclaim, including Martinus for his dramatic camera angles, Camfield for claustrophobic closeup shots, Imison for his use of cameras and movement instead of dialogue, and Tucker for his sense of scale. The designs were similarly praised, especially Barry Newbery's work on The Ark, which Dave Owen called "a stylistic coup", and the western atmosphere of The Gunfighters. However, several reviewers criticised the Monoids' design in The Ark, comparing their hairstyles to those of the Beatles, and the overuse of "The Ballad of the Last Chance Saloon" in The Gunfighters, though some critics appreciated the comedic lyrics and narrative relevance. Several reviewers lauded Raymond Jones's original score in The Savages; DWM's Bishop was surprised to discover it was an original composition for the programme.

== Bibliography ==
=== Book and journal sources ===
- Bignell, Jonathan; O'Day, Andrew (2004). Terry Nation. Manchester University Press. ISBN 978-0-719-06547-7.
- Bould, Mark (2011). "Doctor Who: Adaptations and Flows". In Telotte, J. P.; Duchovnay, Gerald (eds.). Science Fiction Film, Television, and Adaptation: Across the Screens. Routledge. pp. 143–163. ISBN 978-1-136-65009-3.
- Britton, Piers D. (2021). Design for Doctor Who. Bloomsbury Academic. ISBN 978-1-350-11682-5.
- Brunt, David (10 May 2024). The Doctor Who Production Diary: The Hartnell Years. Telos Publishing. ISBN 978-1-845-83222-3.
- Burk, Graeme; Smith?, Robert (2013). Who's 50: The 50 Doctor Who Stories to Watch Before You Die. ECW Press. ISBN 978-1-770-41166-1.
- Burk, Graeme; Smith?, Robert (1 September 2015). The Doctors Are In: The Essential and Unofficial Guide to Doctor Who's Greatest Time Lord. ECW/ORIM. ISBN 978-1-770-90782-9.
- Campbell, Mark (2010). Doctor Who: The Episode Guide. Pocket Essentials. ISBN 978-1-84243-660-8.
- Cartmel, Andrew (2005). Through Time: An Unauthorised and Unofficial History of Doctor Who. Continuum International Publishing Group. ISBN 978-0-826-41734-3.
- Chapman, James (2006). Inside the Tardis: The Worlds of Doctor Who. I.B. Tauris. ISBN 1-84511-162-1.
- Clapham, Mark; Robson, Eddie; Smith, Jim (2005). Who's Next: An Unofficial Guide to Doctor Who. Virgin Books. ISBN 978-0-753-50948-7.
- Cooray Smith, James (March 2016). The Massacre. The Black Archive #2. Edinburgh: Obverse Books. ISBN 978-1-909-03138-8. OCLC 933337656.
- Cornell, Paul; Day, Martin; Topping, Keith (1995). The Discontinuity Guide. London: Virgin Books. ISBN 0-426-20442-5.
- Crome, Andrew (2013). "'Ready to outsit eternity': Human Responses to the Apocalypse". In Leitch, Gillian I. (ed.). Doctor Who in Time and Space: Essays on Themes, Characters, History and Fandom, 1963–2012. McFarland & Company. pp. 175–194. ISBN 978-0-786-46549-1.
- Decker, Kevin S. (2013). Who is Who?: The Philosophy of Doctor Who. I.B. Tauris. ISBN 978-1-780-76553-2.
- Fleiner, Carey; October, Dene, eds. (2017). Doctor Who and History: Critical Essays on Imagining the Past. Jefferson, North Carolina: McFarland & Company. ISBN 978-1-476-66656-3.
  - October, Dene. "Journeys through Cathay: Remediation and Televisuality in Marco Polo". In Fleiner & October (2017), pp. 13–34.
  - Tateishi, Ramie. "History as Genre, Aesthetic and Context in The Gunfighters". In Fleiner & October (2017), pp. 78–91.
- Frankel, Valerie Estelle (2018). Women in Doctor Who: Damsels, Feminists and Monsters. Jefferson: McFarland & Company. ISBN 978-1-493-00016-6.
- Haining, Peter (1983). Doctor Who: A Celebration. London: W. H. Allen & Co. ISBN 0-491-03351-6.
- Harmes, Marcus K. (2014). Doctor Who and the Art of Adaptation. Rowman & Littlefield. ISBN 978-1-442-23284-6.
- Hewett, Richard (23 July 2020). "Who's in Charge?: Changing Character Agency in Early Doctor Who". International Journal of TV Serial Narratives. 6 (1): 5–16. doi:10.6092/issn.2421-454X/9805. ISSN 2421-454X.
- Howe, David J.; Walker, Stephen James (1998). Doctor Who: The Television Companion: Volume 1 (2021 ed.). London: Telos Publishing. ISBN 978-1-845-83156-1.
- Howe, David J.; Walker, Stephen James (2013). Doctor Who: The Television Companion. Vol. 1 (2021 ed.). London: Telos Publishing. ISBN 978-1-845-83156-1.
- Howe, David J.; Walker, Stephen James; Stammers, Mark (1994). The Handbook: The Unofficial and Unauthorised Guide to the Production of 'Doctor Who'. Vol. 1 (2016 ed.). London: Telos Publishing. ISBN 978-1-845-83941-3.
- Howe, David J.; Walker, Stephen James; Stammers, Mark (2005). Doctor Who: The Handbook. Vol. 1 (2016 ed.). London: Telos Publishing. ISBN 978-1-845-83941-3.
- Keen, Antony (2010). "It's about Tempus: Greece and Rome in "Classic" Doctor Who". In Wright, David C. Jr.; Austin, Allan W. (eds.). Space and Time: Essays on Vision of History in Science Fiction and Fantasy Television. Jefferson, North Carolina: McFarland & Company. pp. 100–115. ISBN 978-0-786-43664-4.
- Loborik, Jason; Gibson, Annabel; Laing, Moray; Grange, Emma (2014). Doctor Who Character Encyclopedia (Updated ed.). Dorling Kindersley. ISBN 978-0-241-18222-2.
- Lofficier, Jean-Marc (1989). The Doctor Who Programme Guide. Target Books. ISBN 0-426-20342-9.
- Murray, Amanda (1997). "Pertwee". In Cornell, Paul (ed.). Licence Denied: Rumblings from the Doctor Who Underground. Virgin Books. pp. 21–28. ISBN 0-7535-0104-X.
- Muir, John Kenneth (1999). A Critical History of Doctor Who on Television. Jefferson, North Carolina: McFarland & Company. ISBN 978-0-786-40442-1.
- Nicol, Danny (2 February 2018). Doctor Who: A British Alien?. Palgrave Macmillan Cham. doi:10.1007/978-3-319-65834-6. ISBN 978-3-319-65834-6.
- Orthia, Lindy A. (3 June 2010). "'Sociopathetic Abscess' or 'Yawning Chasm'? The Absent Postcolonial Transition in Doctor Who". The Journal of Commonwealth Literature. 45 (2). SAGE Publications: 207–225. doi:10.1177/0021989410366891. hdl:10440/1261. ISSN 0021-9894. LCCN 65009987. OCLC 47091524.
- Powers, Tom (2016). "A Muted Melody: The (Dis)Empowerment of River Song". In Leitch, Gillian; Ginn, Sherry (eds.). Who Travels with the Doctor? Essays on the Companions of Doctor Who. Jefferson, North Carolina: McFarland & Company. pp. 106–122. ISBN 978-0-786-49525-2.
- Purves, Peter (2009). Peter Purves: My Autobiography. Green Umbrella Publishing. ISBN 978-1-906-63534-3.
- Robb, Brian J. (2013). Timeless Adventures: How Doctor Who Conquered TV. Kamera Books. ISBN 978-1-843-44156-4.
- Smith, Paul MC (July 2021). Based on the Popular BBC Television Serial. Wonderful Books.
- Stanish, Deborah; Myles, L.M., eds. (13 November 2012). Chicks Unravel Time: Women Journey Through Every Season of Doctor Who. Mad Norwegian Press. ISBN 978-1-935-23412-8.
  - Jusino, Teresa. "All of Gallifrey's a Stage: The Doctor in Adolescence". In Stanish & Myles (2012), pp. 224–230.
  - Stanish, Deborah. "Anything Goes". In Stanish & Myles (2012), pp. 158–165.
- Walker, Stephen James (1994). "Background". In McElroy, John (ed.). Doctor Who: The Scripts. 'Galaxy 4'. London: Titan Books. pp. 9–16. ISBN 9-781-85286-566-5.
- Wood, Tat (2009). About Time: The Unauthorised Guide to Doctor Who (2nd ed.). Mad Norwegian Press. ISBN 978-0-975-94467-7.

=== Magazine and news sources ===
- Doctor Who Magazine:
  - Bishop, Vanessa (13 November 2002). Hickman, Clayton (ed.). "Cultured". Doctor Who Magazine. No. 323. Panini Comics. pp. 46–47. ISSN 0957-9818.
  - Bishop, Vanessa (8 January 2003). Hickman, Clayton (ed.). "Absorbing". Doctor Who Magazine. No. 325. Panini Comics. pp. 45–46. ISSN 0957-9818.
  - Darlington, David (9 February 2011). Spilsbury, Tom (ed.). "Licence 2|Entertain!". Doctor Who Magazine. No. 430. Panini Comics. pp. 46–49. ISSN 0957-9818.
  - Gillatt, Gary, ed. (4 June 1997). "Collectors' Heaven". Doctor Who Magazine. No. 252. Marvel Comics. p. 5. ISSN 0957-9818.
  - Gillatt, Gary, ed. (June 1998). "The DWM Awards". Doctor Who Magazine. No. 265. Panini Comics. pp. 4–29.
  - Gillatt, Gary, ed. (23 September 1998). "Gallifrey Guardian". Doctor Who Magazine. No. 269. Marvel Comics. pp. 4–5. ISSN 0957-9818.
  - Gillatt, Gary (20 September 2000). Barnes, Alan (ed.). "The Time Team: Episodes 113 to 120". Doctor Who Magazine. No. 295. Panini Comics. pp. 42–43. ISSN 0957-9818.
  - Gillatt, Gary (24 August 2011). Spilsbury, Tom (ed.). "The Gunfighters & The Awakening". Doctor Who Magazine. No. 437. Panini Comics. pp. 67–69. ISSN 0957-9818.
  - Griffiths, Peter (14 October 2009). Spilsbury, Tom (ed.). "The Mighty 200!". Doctor Who Magazine. No. 413. Panini Comics. pp. 18–42.
  - Guerrier, Simon (August 2013). Hearn, Marcus (ed.). "Peter Purves". Doctor Who 50 Years. No. 2 (special), The Companions. Panini Comics. pp. 16–19.
  - Jones, Dallas (10 June 1992). Russell, Gary (ed.). "Gallifrey Guardian". Doctor Who Magazine. No. 187. Marvel Comics. pp. 4–6. ISSN 0957-9818.
  - Lenman, Jamie (June 2024). Quinn, Jason (ed.). "The Celestial Toymaker". Doctor Who Magazine. No. 604. Panini Magazines. p. 68. ISSN 0957-9818.
  - Lenman, Jamie (May 2025). Quinn, Jason (ed.). "Reviews: The Savages". Doctor Who Magazine. No. 616. Panini Comics. p. 70. ISSN 0957-9818.
  - Michalowski, Mark (August 1987). Cranna, Sheila (ed.). "The Sun Ain't Gonna Shine Anymore". Doctor Who Magazine. No. Special Edition 7: The Complete First Doctor. Marvel Comics. p. 73. ISSN 0957-9818.
  - Molesworth, Richard (2 July 1997). Gillatt, Gary (ed.). "1966 and All That". Doctor Who Magazine. No. 253. Marvel Comics. pp. 6–12. ISSN 0957-9818.
  - Owen, Dave (21 October 1998). Gillatt, Gary (ed.). "Shelf Life". Doctor Who Magazine. No. 270. Marvel Comics. pp. 23–25. ISSN 0957-9818.
  - Pixley, Andrew (20 September 2000). Barnes, Alan (ed.). "The DWM Archive: The Savages". Doctor Who Magazine. No. 295. Panini Comics. pp. 18–24. ISSN 0957-9818.
  - Pixley, Andrew (3 September 2003). Hickman, Clayton (ed.). "1992". Doctor Who Magazine. No. 5 (Special Edition): The Complete Eighth Doctor. Panini Comics. pp. 17–20. ISSN 0963-1275.
  - Quinn, Jason, ed. (May 2026). "The (In)Complete Doctor Who". Doctor Who Magazine. No. 629. Panini Magazines. p. 23. ISSN 0957-9818.
  - Russell, Gary (May 1987). Cranna, Sheila (ed.). "Off the Shelf". Doctor Who Magazine. No. 124. Marvel Comics. pp. 24–25. ISSN 0957-9818.
  - Spilsbury, Tom (7 December 2005). "Season Survey". Doctor Who Magazine. No. 363. Panini Comics. pp. 32–39.
  - Spilsbury, Tom, ed. (September 2008). "DVD update". Doctor Who Magazine. No. 400. Panini Comics. p. 7. ISSN 0957-9818.
  - Spilsbury, Tom, ed. (July 2014). "The First 50 Years". Doctor Who Magazine. No. 474. Panini Comics. pp. 12–69.
  - Spilsbury, Tom (May 2023). Hearn, Marcus (ed.). "The First Doctor". Doctor Who Magazine. No. 589. Panini Comics. pp. 26–29.
  - Wright, Mark (May 2009). Spilsbury, Tom (ed.). "The War Machines". Doctor Who Magazine. No. 22 (Special Edition): 200 Golden Moments. Panini Comics. p. 20. ISSN 0963-1275.
- Daily Express:
  - "Bald-Headed for Dr. Who: What a hair-raiser!". Daily Express. 23 October 1965. p. 11 – via British Newspaper Archive.
  - "Girls chase Dr. Who". Daily Express. 25 June 1965. p. 13 – via British Newspaper Archive.
  - Jackson, Martin (7 August 1965). "UGH calls up new monsters to face Dr. Who". Daily Express. p. 4 – via British Newspaper Archive.
- Daily Mirror
  - Bell, Jack (23 April 1966). "Oh, the Agony of Being Dr Who". Daily Mirror. p. 13. Archived from the original on 9 June 2026 – via Newspapers.com.
  - "Just look what they've done to Lucas". Daily Mirror. 23 May 1966. p. 16. Archived from the original on 9 June 2026 – via Newspapers.com.
  - Pilger, John (29 November 1965). "Face to face: The TV vigilantes who disagree about what is good for you". Daily Mirror. p. 17. Archived from the original on 24 June 2024 – via Newspapers.com.
- Daily Sketch:
  - "Space Agent". Daily Sketch. 4 December 1965. p. 1. Archived from the original on 9 June 2026 – via Newspapers.com.
  - Usher, Shaun (13 July 1965). "How to succeed in writing—by really trying". Daily Sketch. p. 18. Archived from the original on 9 June 2026 – via Newspapers.com.
- Daily Telegraph:
  - Gander, L Marsland (6 September 1965). "1940s Memories". Daily Telegraph. p. 15. Archived from the original on 9 June 2026 – via Newspapers.com.
  - Knight, Peter (4 October 1965). "Mothers set up TV watchdog groups". Daily Telegraph. p. 21. Archived from the original on 9 June 2026 – via Newspapers.com.
- Doctor Who: The Complete History:
  - Ainsworth, John, ed. (2015). "100,000 BC and The Mutants (aka The Daleks)". Doctor Who: The Complete History. 1 (4). London: Panini Comics, Hachette Partworks. ISSN 2057-6048.
  - Wright, Mark, ed. (7 September 2016). "The Savages, The War Machines, The Smugglers and The Tenth Planet". Doctor Who: The Complete History. 8 (27). London: Panini Comics, Hachette Partworks. ISSN 2057-6048.
  - Wright, Mark, ed. (14 June 2017). "Galaxy 4, 'Mission to the Unknown', The Myth Makers and The Daleks' Master Plan". Doctor Who: The Complete History. 6 (47). London: Panini Comics, Hachette Partworks. ISSN 2057-6048.
  - Wright, Mark, ed. (13 June 2018). "The Massacre of St Bartholomew's Eve, The Ark, The Celestial Toymaker and The Gunfighters". Doctor Who: The Complete History. 7 (73). London: Panini Comics, Hachette Partworks. ISSN 2057-6048.
- The Stage and Television Today:
  - "Anneke Wills and Michael Craze who will play the roles of Polly and Ben in the autumn series of Dr. Who". The Stage and Television Today. 7 July 1966. p. 11 – via British Newspaper Archive.
  - "New four-part Dr. Who". The Stage and Television Today. 9 September 1965. p. 11 – via British Newspaper Archive.
- Western Daily Press:
  - "Date for Daleks". Western Daily Press. 9 May 1966. p. 2. Archived from the original on 9 June 2026 – via Newspapers.com.
  - Forth, Peter (7 March 1966). "Dr Who is back in orbit". Western Daily Press. p. 8. Archived from the original on 9 June 2026 – via Newspapers.com.
  - "Meet the Monoid". Western Daily Press. 19 February 1966. p. 2. Archived from the original on 9 June 2026 – via Newspapers.com.
  - "The Who Look – Bald as a Dalek". Western Daily Press. 23 October 1965. p. 9. Archived from the original on 27 June 2024 – via Newspapers.com.

=== Home media sources ===
- Brunt, David (compiler) (2011). The Gunfighters (Production Information Subtitles). 2 Entertain.
- Denman, Stuart (director); Hadoke, Toby (presenter) (2025). Remembering/Forgetting The Savages (documentary). BBC Studios.
- Ferguson, Michael; Wills, Anneke (25 August 2008). The War Machines (audio commentary). 2 Entertain.
- Smith, Jim (compiler) (2011). The Ark (Production Subtitles). 2 Entertain.
- Wiggins, Martin (compiler) (2024). The Celestial Toymaker (Production Subtitles). 2 Entertain.
