= The Devil in the Fog =

1968 British children's TV series

- Based on: The Devil in the Fog by Leon Garfield
- Starring: Nicholas Evans
- Country of origin: United Kingdom
- Original language: English
- No. of series: 1
- No. of episodes: 6 (1 missing)

Production
- Producer: Michael Currer-Briggs
- Production company: Rediffusion London

Original release
- Network: ITV
- Release: 17 June – 22 July 1968

The Devil in the Fog is a 1968 British children’s historical television series based on the award winning novel of the same name by Leon Garfield.

== Story ==
The story focuses on George Treet, the eldest son and self proclaimed genius of the Treet family of travelling players. One night, a stranger visits the head of the family, Salathie Treet with an important message, to reveal to George that he is not a son of the Treet family but a nobleman, Baron Dexter. With this revaluation, George travels to the Baron's home to find an inhospitable mansion and a dying father. Soon George finds himself entangled in a family feud and comes to the revaluation that the Treet's are his real family.

== Cast ==
- Nicholas Evans as George Treet
- Martin Dempsey as Salathiel Treet
- Keith Skinner as Edward Treet
- Diana Simpson as Jane Treet
- John Moulder-Brown as Hotspur Treet
- Verina Greenlaw as Rose Treet
- Richard Leech as Sir John Dexter
- Gary Watson as Captain Richard Dexter
- Stephanie Bidmead as Lady Dexter
- Milton Johns as Joseph
- Valentine Dyall as The Stranger
- Peggy Ann Clifford as Mrs Goater

== Production ==
Unlike the novel where George was aged 14, the series aged up the character by a few years. Producer Michale Currer-Briggs searched around Sussex for a suitable Manor House for scenes until he read of Ightham Mote, a 14 century Manor House near Sevenoaks, Kent.

I'd been motoring since dawn, then the fog came down. I was lost… suddenly, after an hour of circling aimlessly through swirling mists I spotted Ightham Mote. It was empty and deserted looking. Its eeriness sent chills through me. Immediately I knew this was it.

== Episodes ==
| No. | Title | Directed by | Original release date | Archive status |
|---|---|---|---|---|
| 1 | "Some Are Born of Greatness..." | Michael Currer-Briggs | 17 June 1968 | Survives |
| 2 | "Some Have Greatness Thrust Upon Them..." | Michael Currer-Briggs | 24 June 1968 | Survives |
| 3 | "O My Prophetic Soul! My Uncle!" | Michael Currer-Briggs | 1 July 1968 | Survives |
| 4 | "That One May Smile, and Smile, and Be a Villain..." | Michael Currer-Briggs | 8 July 1968 | Survives |
| 5 | "Fair as Foul, and Foul is Fair..." | Michael Currer-Briggs | 15 July 1968 | Missing |
| 6 | "...This Fell Serjeant, Death..." | Michael Currer-Briggs | 22 July 1968 | Survives |

== Missing episode ==
Only episode 5 is missing.

== External link ==
- The Devil in the Fog at IMDb
