= Stephanie Bidmead =

British actress

- Photo by Mark Gudgeon, 1967
- Born: 29 January 1929; Kidderminster, Worcestershire, England
- Died: 22 September 1974 (aged 45); Richmond-upon-Thames, Surrey, England
- Occupation: Actress
- Notable work: Maaga in Doctor Who: Galaxy 4 (1965)
- Spouse: Henry Bardon
- Children: 2 sons

Stephanie Bidmead (29 January 1929 – 22 September 1974) was a British stage and television actress.

== Early life ==
She was born in Kidderminster. She attended Kidderminster High School for Girls, a girls' grammar school. In 1977 it became part of King Charles I School.

== Career ==
She was a member of the Royal Shakespeare Company in the late 1950s, and played in Peter Brook's 1957 production of The Tempest, and in 1959 played opposite Charles Laughton in King Lear and A Midsummer Night's Dream.

She began to work in television during the 1960s, with credits in Doctor Who, the final episode of Maigret and Adam Adamant Lives!. In the Doctor Who serial Galaxy 4 she played the Drahvin leader Maaga.

In 1972 she played the lead role of Queen Elizabeth I in Robert Bolt's play Vivat! Vivat Regina! in the Birmingham Rep production.

== Personal life ==
She had two sons with Moravian theatre designer Henry Bardon. She was diagnosed with anterior horn cell myelitis and died on 22 September 1974 at the age of 45.

== Filmography ==
=== Film ===
- 1965: Invasion – Elaine
- 1972: Running Scared – Mrs. Case

=== Television ===
- 1960: An Age of Kings (Episode: "Henry V") – Queen of France
- 1963: Jane Eyre – Leah
- 1963: Maigret – Maigret's Little Joke – Antoinette Videl
- 1964: R3 (Episode: ""On the Spike") – Doris Haley
- 1964: Crane (Episode: "Knife in the Dark") – Annette Brillon
- 1964: Coronation Street – Lily Haddon
- 1965: The Mask of Janus (Episode: "And the Fish Are Biting") – Sylvie
- 1965: Doctor Who (Episode: "Galaxy 4") – Maaga
- 1965: Sherlock Holmes (Episode: "Charles Augustus Milverton") – Lady Farmingham
- 1966: Public Eye (Episode: "There Are More Things in Heaven and Earth") - Stella Rouse
- 1966: Adam Adamant Lives! (Episode: "Death Has a Thousand Faces") – Madame Delvario
- 1968: The Devil in the Fog – Lady Dexter
- 1971: Public Eye (Episode: "Ward of Court") – Ruth
- 1971: Doomwatch (Episode: "The Web of Fear") – Janine
- 1972: Public Eye (Episode: "The Windsor Royal") - Penny Lawrence
- 1973: The Onedin Line (Episode: "Law of the Fist") – Mrs Darling
- 1973: Bedtime Stories (Episode: "Jack and the Beanstalk") – Linda Weir (final appearance)
