= Galaxy 4 =

018 – Galaxy 4
- Doctor Who serial
- The Drahvins are depicted as beautiful but ultimately cruel, in contrast to the unattractive but friendly Rills. They were originally male, but rewritten as female due to the emerging women's liberation movement.

Cast
- Doctor: William Hartnell – First Doctor
- Companions: Maureen O'Brien – Vicki; Peter Purves – Steven Taylor
- Others: Stephanie Bidmead – Maaga; Marina Martin, Susanna Caroll, Lyn Ashley – Drahvins; Jimmy Kaye, William Shearer, Angelo Muscat, Pepi Poupée, Tommy Reynolds – Chumblies; Robert Cartland – Rill Voices; Barry Jackson – Garvey

Production
- Directed by: Derek Martinus (Note: Mervyn Pinfield directed some early footage for the serial before his failing health prevented him from continuing; he was uncredited.)
- Written by: William Emms
- Script editor: Donald Tosh
- Produced by: Verity Lambert
- Music by: None (Note: The serial uses stock music, primarily from the group Les Structures Sonores: from the group, Jacques Lasry's work was used in all four episodes, while Daniel Ouzounoff was used in the first two, and Jacques Chollet in the second. The fourth episode also uses a piece from Trevor Duncan.)
- Production code: T
- Series: Season 3
- Running time: 4 episodes, 25 minutes each
- Episode(s) missing: 3 episodes (1, 2, 4) (Note: Six minutes exist from the first episode.)
- First broadcast: 11 September 1965
- Last broadcast: 2 October 1965

Chronology
← Preceded by The Time Meddler	Followed by → "Mission to the Unknown"

Galaxy 4 (Note: Alternatively written as Galaxy Four) is the first serial of the third season of the British science fiction television series Doctor Who. Written by William Emms and directed by Derek Martinus, the serial was broadcast on BBC1 in four weekly parts from 11 September to 2 October 1965. In the serial, the First Doctor (William Hartnell) and his travelling companions Vicki (Maureen O'Brien) and Steven (Peter Purves) arrive on an arid planet, where they encounter the beautiful but dangerous Drahvins and the hideous but friendly Rills, two crash-landed species in conflict with one another. Both species wish to escape as the planet is set to explode in two dawns, but the Drahvin leader Maaga (Stephanie Bidmead) wants only her people to make it out alive.

Emms, an avid Doctor Who viewer since its beginning, was commissioned to write Galaxy 4 by outgoing story editor Dennis Spooner after submitting an unsolicited story idea: show two conflicting races—one beautiful and one ugly—and flip convention by making the beautiful race evil. Spooner's successor Donald Tosh handled the bulk of the rewrites. Although Verity Lambert was credited as producer, Galaxy 4 was the first serial to be produced by her successor John Wiles. Mervyn Pinfield was originally assigned to direct the story but his failing health shortly into production prevented him from continuing, and he was replaced by Derek Martinus, a new director. Galaxy 4 was the penultimate serial of the show's second recording block but was pushed to open the third season. Filming took place at the Television Centre in July 1965.

Galaxy 4 received high viewership numbers, with an average of 9.9 million viewers across the four episodes; and the third episode became the most-viewed of the third season with 11 million viewers. Contemporary and retrospective reviews were generally positive, with praise for its concept and originality. The videotapes of the serial were wiped by the BBC in the late 1960s; the third episode was recovered in 2011, but the other three episodes remain missing. Galaxy 4 received print and audiobook adaptations, and was released on VHS and DVD with reconstructions of the missing episodes using telesnaps and off-air recordings; an animated version of the serial has also been released on DVD and Blu-ray.

== Plot ==
The First Doctor (William Hartnell) and his companions Vicki (Maureen O'Brien), and Steven Taylor (Peter Purves) arrive on a silent planet and encounter short, blind, non-humanoid robots, dubbed "Chumblies" by Vicki. Before the trio decide whether the Chumblies are hostile, one of the robots is disabled by an all-female party of cloned blonde Drahvin warriors from the planet Drahva in the same galaxy as the silent planet, Galaxy 4. The Drahvins are dominated by their cruel leader, Maaga (Stephanie Bidmead), who treats her simple-minded subordinates with bullying contempt. The Drahvins are at war with the reptilian Rills, the masters of the Chumblies, and both races have crashed spaceships on this planet. According to the Drahvins, the planet will be destroyed in 14 planetary cycles and, with their ship irreparable, Maaga and her warriors seek to capture the Rill ship, which they believe has been made functional again. Maaga describes the Drahvins as the victims of the conflict with the Rills, but the Doctor has witnessed some of the Drahvin aggression and is not convinced. Using the TARDIS, he calculates the planet will break up in just two days' time. The Doctor tries to keep this new finding from the Drahvins, but Maaga forces the truth from him at the point of a gun.

With Steven held as hostage to ensure their co-operation, the Doctor and Vicki are sent by the Drahvins to try to seize control of the Rill ship. The Doctor works out that the ammonia-breathing Rills (voiced by Robert Cartland) are a very advanced species: when he meets one, he is impressed, particularly by their use of telepathy. The huge and impressive, horned warthog-like Rill explains that they have offered to take the Drahvins away with them but Maaga has refused, preferring to maintain a state of war. The Doctor tells the Rills of the true life remaining in the planet and promises to help them escape, since the solar energy converters on the Rill craft have not gathered enough power to effect a lift-off. The Doctor and Vicki return to the Drahvin ship to find Steven unconscious after Maaga has tried to kill him by leaving him in a depressurised airlock. They all return to the Rill vessel, where the Doctor successfully develops a power converter linked to the TARDIS, which charges the Rill craft. Maaga leads the Drahvins in a final assault, but the Chumblies defend their ship long enough for it to power up and leave the planet. A Chumbley helps the Doctor, Vicki, and Steven to return to the TARDIS. After they leave, the planet explodes, killing the Drahvins.

In the TARDIS, Vicki identifies a planet on the scanner. On the planet, an astronaut (Barry Jackson) wakes up in an alien jungle, repeating the phrase "I must kill".

== Production ==
=== Conception and writing ===
Schoolteacher-turned-screenwriter William Emms, a science-fiction fan and avid Doctor Who viewer since its beginning in 1963, submitted an unsolicited story idea to producer Verity Lambert and story editor Dennis Spooner in early 1965. His idea was to show two conflicting races—one beautiful and one ugly—and flip convention by making the beautiful race evil. Spooner commissioned Emms to write the serial, then named Doctor Who and the Chumblies on 1 March 1965, with a script due date set for 15 April. In mid-April, Spooner's successor Donald Tosh began working on Doctor Who, and handled the bulk of the rewrites for Emms's scripts; Spooner departed in mid-May. Emms disliked the amendments, which had included the reduction of four main cast members to three, and replacing the role of Barbara Wright—who had departed in the previous season—with Steven, which he felt made little sense as Steven was a trained astronaut and would not allow himself to become trapped in an airlock. The show's cast were also unhappy with the script; Hartnell and O'Brien felt that the dialogue and behaviour were inconsistent with their characters, and Purves felt that his dialogue was not changed enough from the original script with Barbara. According to Emms, Hartnell's role on the show was threatened if he did not follow the script.

Galaxy 4 was the penultimate serial of the show's second recording block, which had begun with the second season's The Rescue; alongside the following episode, "Mission to the Unknown", Galaxy 4's broadcast was pushed to open the show's third season. Although Lambert was credited as producer for Galaxy 4, her successor—John Wiles, who had joined the programme in early June 1965—was effectively responsible for the show during its production. Mervyn Pinfield—an experienced BBC figure who acted as the show's associate producer from its origins to January 1965—was originally assigned to direct Galaxy 4. Pinfield had most recently directed The Space Museum (1965), but was given a larger budget for Galaxy 4; he was also assigned to direct "Mission to the Unknown", effectively combining the two stories in a single five-week production block. Soon after production commenced, Pinfield's failing health prevented him from continuing. Lambert brought on Derek Martinus to replace Pinfield. Martinus had recently completed the BBC's internal directors' course, and had no previous experience leading a television production. Having only seen a few episodes of Doctor Who, Martinus reviewed some of the previous stories with Lambert; he found them disappointing, which shocked Lambert, but stated that he wanted to aim for higher standards. Pinfield was still actively directing as Martinus began, and continued to work alongside him throughout the first week. After Pinfield's departure, Martinus prepared his own camera scripts for the studio production. Galaxy 4 was Pinfield's final work for Doctor Who and the BBC, though he remained uncredited on the broadcast version; he retired from active television production shortly thereafter.

=== Casting and characters ===
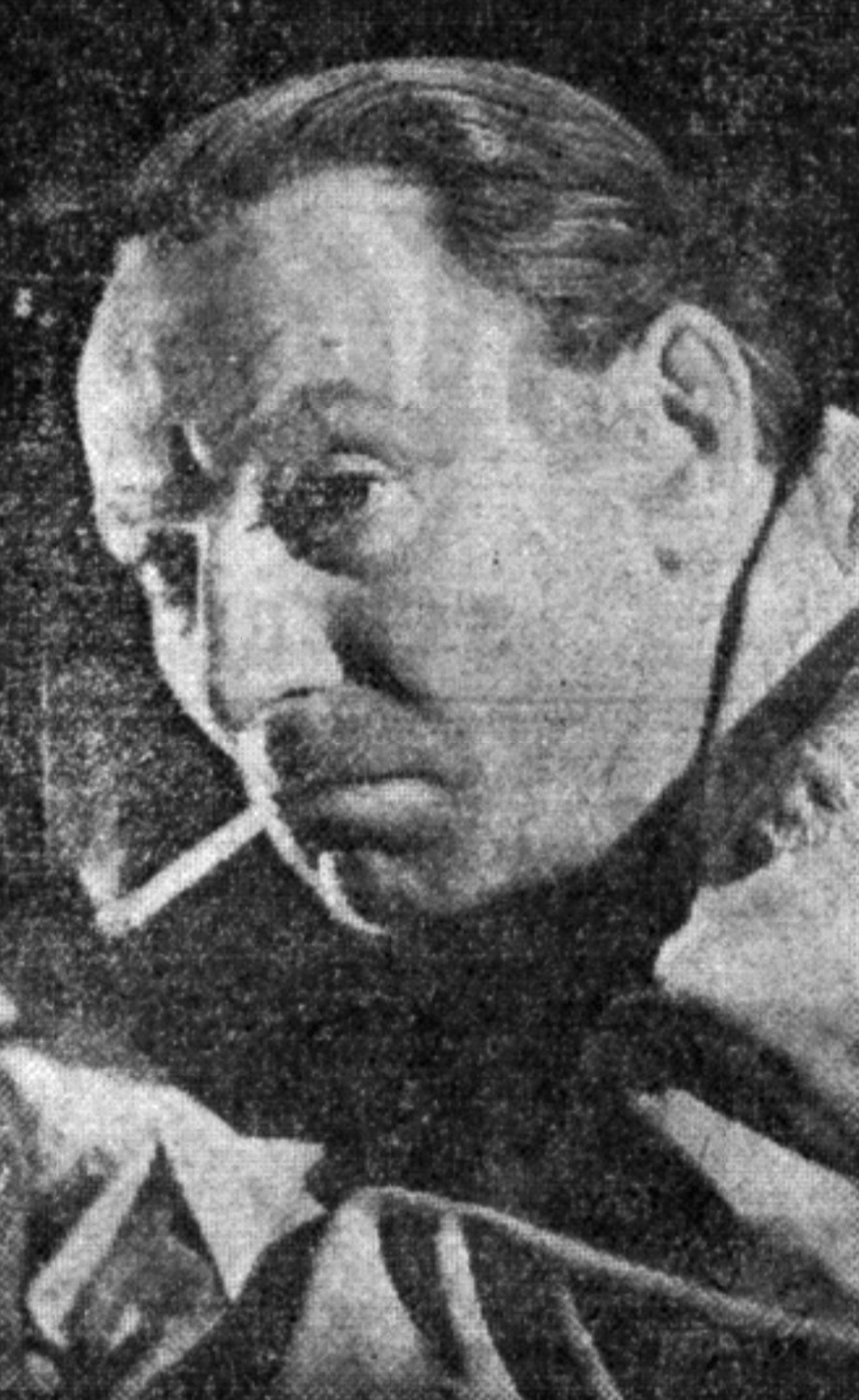
William Hartnell

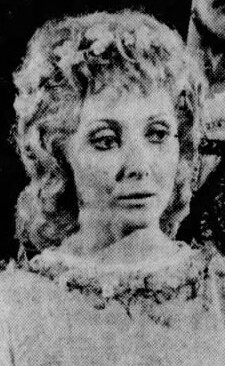
Maureen O'Brien

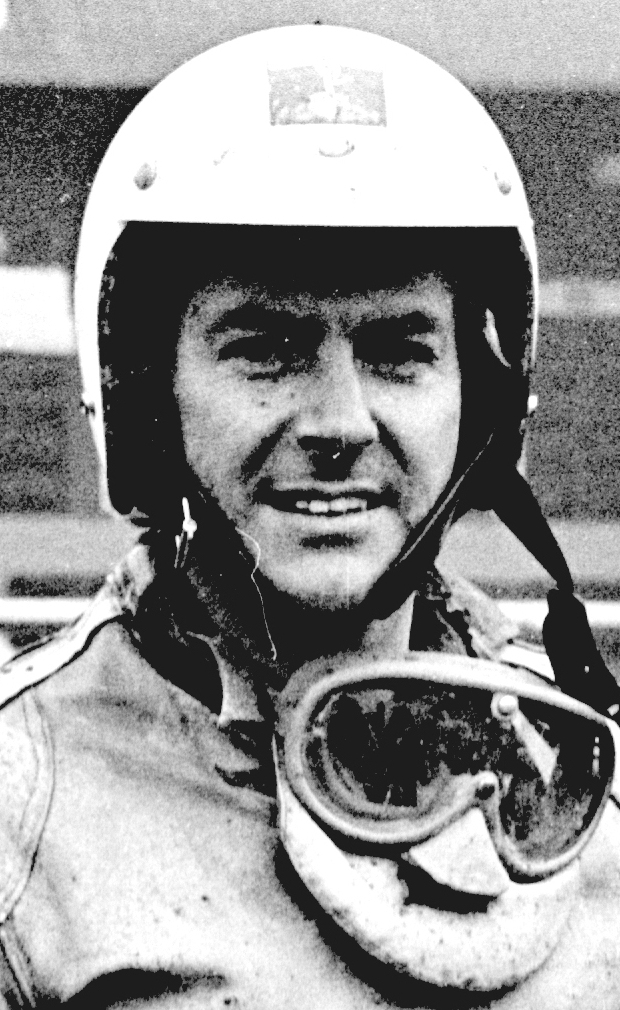
Peter Purves

The main cast were unhappy with the scripts for Galaxy 4; Hartnell and O'Brien felt that they were inconsistent with their characters, and Purves felt that too little had been changed since his role had originally been written for a different character.

The Chumblies were named from the combination of the words "chum" and "friendly". Production designer Richard Hunt created the Chumblies. Four robots were made, each about 3 feet (0.91 m) in height and consisting of three stacked domes made of fibreglass. Various stick-like appendages could be attached to the robot between the base and second dome, and these could be moved by the performer inside. A ring of small domes in the shape of rocket engine nozzles surrounded the base of each robot, hiding the casters on which the costume moved as well as imitating the propulsion units of the mechanoid.

The four warthog-like Rill costumes were made of grey-green painted fibreglass and latex. The costumes were largely immobile, although the performer inside could move the arms. To simulate the ammonia atmosphere the Rills breathed, dry ice fog was used. Anthony Paul was hired to voice the Rills, but a late scheduling conflict prevented him from doing so; he was replaced by Robert Cartland. The Drahvins were originally named Dravians, and written as a race of male soldiers; during casting, which took place in early June 1965, Lambert suggested that their gender be switched to female, in part as a nod to the emerging women's liberation movement and to better emphasise their attractiveness. Emms concurred with the change. Around this time, the Drahvin leader's name was changed from Gar to Maaga. Some of the Chumbley performers—Angelo Muscat, Jimmy Kaye, and William Shearer—were hired through a company called Lester's Midgets.

=== Filming ===
A week of filming took place at Ealing Studios on 21–25 June 1965, largely for the serial's effects, such as the opening of the first episode and conclusion of the fourth. The first day of production was focused on effects and long shots of the Chumblies on the planet. Live action shooting began the following day, requiring the Chumbley operators. A photocall for the Chumblies and Drahvins took place at Ealing on 24 June; this was also Martinus's first day on the programme, when Hartnell, O'Brien, and Purves were released from rehearsals of the third episode of the preceding serial, The Time Meddler (1965), to film inserts. Martinus had planned for long tracking shots in the first episode to indicate the expanse of the set, but the camera crew convinced him to focus primarily on Hartnell, as viewers were mostly interested in his performance. Hartnell also wanted to offer guidance to Martinus, based on his decades of experience in the industry. The cast had troubles during the rehearsal process for the serial due to transitions within the production staff: Purves was upset following Spooner's departure as he had developed much of Steven's character, and Hartnell's relationship with Wiles began with difficulties; O'Brien helped Hartnell through his struggles with the production, and Purves began developing a friendship with him, inviting him to dinner every fortnight. Weekly recording for the serial began on 9 July 1965 in Studio 4 of the Television Centre; the final episode was recorded on 30 July. To depict the destruction of the planet in the last episode, an exploding planet prop was filmed and then shown in reverse. The serial's final scene with Jackson as astronaut Garvey was filmed alongside the following story, "Mission to the Unknown", on 6 August 1965, and inserted into Galaxy 4 during editing. Recording for the four episodes cost a total of £9,950. (Note: The four episodes cost £3,100, £2,094, £2,293, and £2,463, respectively.)

== Reception ==
=== Broadcast and ratings ===
Episode	Title	Run time	Original release date	UK viewers (millions)	Appreciation Index
1	"Four Hundred Dawns"^{†}	22:21	11 September 1965	9.0	56
2	"Trap of Steel"^{†}	24:51	18 September 1965	9.5	55
3	"Air Lock"	24:19	25 September 1965	11.3	54
4	"The Exploding Planet"^{†}	24:47	2 October 1965	9.9	53

^† Episode is missing

The serial was broadcast on BBC1 in four weekly parts from 11 September to 2 October 1965. Viewership was higher than in the previous year, giving a strong start to the new season; it averaged 9.9 million viewers across the four weeks, with the third episode of Galaxy 4 becoming the most-viewed of the show's third season with 11 million viewers, and the last two episodes made the top 20 shows of the week. The Appreciation Index remained consistent throughout the serial, dropping one point each week, from 56 to 53.

The videotapes of the serial were wiped in the late 1960s: the first, second, and fourth episodes on 17 August 1967, and the third on 31 January 1969. BBC Enterprises retained 16 mm film recordings for foreign sales, providing a short extract from the first episode for the 1977 documentary Whose Doctor Who; an extended six-minute version of this sequence was kept by Jan Vincent-Rudzki, then-president of the Doctor Who Appreciation Society, who assisted with the documentary. The prints were junked shortly thereafter, as confirmed by BBC Enterprises in March 1978.

At the Missing Believed Wiped event on 11 December 2011, it was announced that the third episode had been discovered earlier that year among materials owned by former television engineer Terry Burnett, who had purchased it at a school fete in the 1980s but not realised its significance until speaking to Ralph Montagu, head of heritage at Radio Times; the final shots and closing credits were missing from the episode, and the tapes featured some visual discrepancies that required cleaning.

=== Critical response ===
After the broadcast of the second episode, Bill Edmund of Television Today wrote that the characters were "a little sluggish after their holiday", praising Vicki and Steven's replacement of Ian and Barbara but describing the story as "rather slow". On Junior Points of View, presenter Muriel Young reported that some young viewers had called the programme "dreadfully boring" and "absolutely stupid". The BBC Programme Review Board after the third episode noted that television controller Huw Wheldon was satisfied with the Chumblies. The Listener noted that the end of the third episode—the Drahvins locking Steven in an airlock—was "nightmare food and could raise trouble among feminists as well as psychiatrists"; Monica Furlong of the Daily Mail later compared the ending to a similar scene in The Man from U.N.C.L.E. episode "The Neptune Affair".

Retrospective reviews were positive. In The Discontinuity Guide (1995), Paul Cornell, Martin Day, and Keith Topping felt that the serial "presents an interesting if flawed twist on the traditional bug-eyed monster tale". In The Television Companion (1998), David J. Howe and Stephen James Walker described the story as "an unfailingly entertaining one", praising its original ideas and high production value. In A Critical History of Doctor Who (1999), John Kenneth Muir called the serial "intelligent", largely due to its unique philosophy of making the humanoids "monstrous" and the "ugly" characters friendly. In 2012, Radio Times's Patrick Mulkern thought the serial was "by no means a classic" but did have "sparks of originality", particularly in Lambert's changes to the Drahvins and Martinus's dramatic camera angles. In 2021, Starburst's Paul Mount criticised the story's writing and "lifeless performances", though noted that Bidmead "manages to imbue her character with a bit of pseudo-Shakespearean gravitas".

== Commercial releases ==
Galaxy Four
- Author: William Emms
- Cover artist: Andrew Skilleter
- Series: Doctor Who book: Target novelisations
- Release number: 104
- Publisher: Target Books
- Publication date: 1985 (hardback); 1986 (paperback)
- ISBN: 0-491-03691-4

A novelisation of this serial, Galaxy Four by William Emms, was published in hardback in 1985 by W. H. Allen, and in paperback in 1986 by Target Books. The serial's complete scripts, alongside some behind-the-scenes information, were published in a book by Titan Books in July 1994, edited by John McElroy. Harlequin Miniatures produced metal models of a Chumbley and Rill in 1998, and a Drahvin in 1999.

=== Home media ===
Music and sound effects from the serial were included on Doctor Who: 30 Years at the BBC Radiophonic Workshop in July 1993, on Doctor Who at the BBC Radiophonic Workshop Volume 1: The Early Years 1963–1969 in May 2000, and on Doctor Who: The 50th Anniversary Collection in December 2013. The off-air audio recording of the serial was released on a double-CD pack by BBC Worldwide in June 2000, narrated by Peter Purves; it was released as a vinyl record by Demon Records on 13 April 2019, to coincide with Record Store Day.

The existing clip from the first episode of Galaxy 4 was featured in the documentary The Missing Years, released on VHS as part of The Ice Warriors Collection in November 1998, and on DVD as part of Lost in Time in November 2004. Using off-screen photographs, animation, and audio recordings, an abridged reconstruction of Galaxy 4 was included in the Special Edition DVD release of The Aztecs in March 2013, alongside the full recovered third episode. The third episode was added to the streaming service BritBox in the United Kingdom on 26 December 2019.

==== Animated release ====
BBC Studios released an animated version of Galaxy 4 on DVD and Blu-ray on 15 November 2021. The animation is viewable in either black-and-white or colour, and the release includes documentaries on the serial and its recovery, audio commentaries, and remastered versions of the surviving clip and episode. A limited edition SteelBook version was also available. The animation was created by Big Finish Creative, led by director and producer Chloe Grech, who had previously worked as a line producer on the 2020 animation of Fury from the Deep (1968); she had also co-directed the final episode of Fury from the Deep, which led to her being chosen as director for Galaxy 4.

The animation was produced during the COVID-19 pandemic, with key production members located around the world: Grech and post-production team Thaumaturgy in Sydney, executive producers Gary Russell and Jason Haigh-Ellery in the United Kingdom, executive producer Mark B. Oliver in New York, and animation team Digitoonz Media & Entertainment in India. Grech cited several Australian inspirations for the reconstruction, such as waratah for the planet's red flowers and the Outback for the orange and red desert. The animation team took creative liberties with the space and setup of some locations to represent the original team's vision if they had not been encumbered by budget restraints. The bright colours of the Rills' ship were inspired by the similar colours of the USS Enterprise's bridge from Star Trek: The Original Series. Starburst's Paul Mount praised the release's special features but described the animation as "half-hearted" and noted it was "likely to be left on the shelf to gather dust". The animations were screened at BFI Southbank on 7 November 2021, and added to BBC iPlayer on 1 November 2023 alongside most other serials.

== Bibliography ==
- Cornell, Paul; Day, Martin; Topping, Keith (1995). The Discontinuity Guide. London: Virgin Books. ISBN 0-426-20442-5.
- Howe, David J.; Walker, Stephen James (1998). Doctor Who: The Television Companion: Volume 1 (2021 ed.). London: BBC Books. ISBN 978-1-845-83156-1.
- Howe, David J.; Walker, Stephen James; Stammers, Mark (1994). The Handbook: The Unofficial and Unauthorised Guide to the Production of 'Doctor Who'. Vol. 1 (2016 ed.). Prestatyn: Telos Publishing. ISBN 978-1-845-83941-3.
- Molesworth, Richard (2010). Wiped!: Doctor Who's Missing Episodes. Prestatyn: Telos Publishing. ISBN 978-1-845-83080-9.
- Muir, John Kenneth (1999). A Critical History of Doctor Who on Television. Jefferson, North Carolina: McFarland & Company. ISBN 978-0-786-40442-1.
- Walker, Stephen James (1994). "Background". In McElroy, John (ed.). Doctor Who: The Scripts. 'Galaxy 4'. London: Titan Books. pp. 9–16. ISBN 9-781-85286-566-5.
- Wright, Mark, ed. (2017). "Galaxy 4, Mission to the Unknown, The Myth Makers and The Daleks' Master Plan". Doctor Who: The Complete History. 6 (47). London: Panini Comics, Hachette Partworks. ISSN 2057-6048.
