= William Emms =

British scriptwriter (1930–1993)

- Born: William John Emms; 29 January 1930; Australia
- Died: 18 February 1993 (aged 63); Sussex, England
- Occupations: school teacher and scriptwriter

William Emms (29 January 1930 – 18 February 1993) was an Australian schoolteacher and occasional screenwriter for British television.

== Writing ==
In 1965 he wrote the Doctor Who serial Galaxy 4 and later adapted the script for a Target novelisation. Later scripts for the programme during the 1960s and 1980s were not commissioned. He did however write a Doctor Who gamebook entitled Mission to Venus as part of the Make your own adventure with Doctor Who range.

In a writing career lasting from 1963 to 1980 he contributed to popular shows such as Callan, Ace of Wands, Crown Court, Play of the Month, The Revenue Men, The Expert, Champion House, Redcap, R3, Public Eye, Z-Cars, Homicide and Crossroads.
