= Imison =

Imison is a surname, and may refer to:

- John Imison (died 1788), English mechanic and printer
- Michael Imison (born 1935), British television director and literary agent
- Rachel Imison (born 1978), Australian field hockey player
- Richard Imison (1936–1993), British radio script editor
- Tamsyn Imison (1937-2017), British educator, wife of Michael Imison
