= The End of the World (Doctor Who) =

158 – "The End of the World"
- Doctor Who episode

Cast
- Doctor: Christopher Eccleston – Ninth Doctor
- Companion: Billie Piper – Rose Tyler
- Others: Simon Day – Steward; Yasmin Bannerman – Jabe; Jimmy Vee – Moxx of Balhoon; Zoë Wanamaker – Cassandra (voice); Camille Coduri – Jackie Tyler; Beccy Armory – Raffalo; Sara Stewart – Computer Voice; Silas Carson – Alien Voices

Production
- Directed by: Euros Lyn
- Written by: Russell T Davies
- Produced by: Phil Collinson
- Executive producers: Russell T Davies; Julie Gardner; Mal Young
- Music by: Murray Gold
- Production code: 1.2
- Series: Series 1
- Running time: 44 minutes
- First broadcast: 2 April 2005

Chronology
← Preceded by "Rose"	Followed by → "The Unquiet Dead"

"The End of the World" is the second episode of the first series of the British science fiction television programme Doctor Who. Written by executive producer Russell T Davies and directed by Euros Lyn, the episode was first broadcast on BBC One on 2 April 2005 and was seen by approximately 7.97 million viewers in the United Kingdom.

In the episode, the alien time traveller the Ninth Doctor (Christopher Eccleston) takes his new companion Rose Tyler (Billie Piper) five billion years into the future, where many rich alien delegates have gathered on a space station called Platform One to watch the Sun expand into a red giant and destroy the Earth. However, the human guest Lady Cassandra (Zoë Wanamaker) is plotting to profit from the event by fabricating a hostage situation.

"The End of the World" is the first episode of the revival to be set in the future. Due in part to the numerous SFX shots, the episode used up most of the series' SFX budget. The episode also features numerous intricate costumes. Location filming principally took place in Cardiff in October 2004, with some additional scenes shot in Cardiff and Penarth in November 2004 and February 2005. Studio work was recorded in the Unit Q2 warehouse in Newport from September to November 2004. The episode marked the first appearance of Cassandra and the Face of Boe, both of which would appear in the series two episode "New Earth". This was also the first episode of the series to include mention of the phrase "Bad Wolf", a recurring arc throughout the first series that would set up the events of the finale.

== Plot ==
The Ninth Doctor takes Rose five billion years into her future. They land on Platform One, a space station in orbit around Earth. They have arrived in time for a party celebrating the final destruction of the long-abandoned Earth by the expansion of the Sun. The Doctor uses his psychic paper to pass as their invitation to the party, and he and Rose find many elite alien beings there. The guests include Lady Cassandra, who is billed as "the last human" but is actually a face on a large sheet of skin that must be continually moisturised. Also present is the Face of Boe.

Meanwhile, the gifts brought by the Adherents of the Repeated Meme contain robotic spiders that immediately work at disabling functions on Platform One. The Steward of Platform One is killed when the spiders lower the solar filter of his room and expose him to the powerful solar radiation. After Rose insults Cassandra, the Adherents follow her and knock her unconscious. They drag her into an observation room and set the solar filter to descend. The Doctor gets the filter back up but cannot get her out.

The Doctor determines that the Adherents sabotaged Platform One. However, they are robots commanded by Cassandra. Cassandra admits to being the saboteur: her original plan was to create a hostage situation (with herself as one of the "victims") and profit from the compensation she would have had, but now intends to gain money from her stock holdings in the companies of the guests' competitors to increase in value after they die. Cassandra teleports off the station as the spiders bring down the shielding on the entire station. The Doctor and the sentient tree Jabe travel to the bowels of Platform One to restore the automated shields, but it requires one of them to travel through several spinning fans. Jabe sacrifices herself within extreme heat to hold down a switch to slow down the fan blades. This allows the Doctor to reactivate the system just before the expanding Sun hits the station and destroys Earth.

The Doctor reverses Cassandra's teleport and brings her back onto the station. In the elevated temperature and without moisture, Cassandra's body creaks and ruptures, snapping from her frame. The Doctor explains to Rose that he is the last of the Time Lords, and that his planet was destroyed in the wake of a great war.

== Production ==
=== Conception ===
"The End of the World" was conceived as a deliberately expensive spectacle to show off how much the new Doctor Who could do. Platform One was designed to be like a "hotel for the most poshest, richest, and influential aliens in the universe", and is partly based on Douglas Adams' The Restaurant at the End of the Universe.

One function of the episode is to reveal that the Doctor is the last of his people. Davies had also initially intended to have the last humans escaping the doomed Earth aboard massive space arks (similar arks appeared in the serial The Ark). This was dropped when the complexity of the character of Cassandra was fully realised during development. The episode features the first appearance of concepts such as the psychic paper, the Time War and the words 'Bad Wolf', which would go on to form a story arc throughout the series. It also mentions the TARDIS' universal translation capabilities, which had been referenced in the 1976 serial The Masque of Mandragora. An unaired scene would have shown the Doctor to have nine strands of DNA instead of one, an allusion to his eight previous incarnations.

This episode begins with a cold open, the first time Doctor Who did this, which would soon become a standard feature. The show had previously used pre-credits teaser sequences, but only for some special episodes in the 1980s, such as the post-regeneration Castrovalva (1982); the 20th-anniversary special, "The Five Doctors" (1983); and the 25th-anniversary story, Remembrance of the Daleks (1988).

The villain Lady Cassandra, a CGI creation voiced by actress Zoë Wanamaker, was developed for the episode. Executive producer Russell T Davies stated that Cassandra was inspired by drastic beauty treatments that had been taken by female celebrities, particularly inspired by the appearance of various ones at the Oscars. He said, "It was horrific seeing those beautiful women reduced to sticks. Nicole Kidman struck me in particular. Nicole is one of the most beautiful women in the world. But she looks horrifying because she’s so thin. It’s like we’re killing these women in public. We watch while you die." Originally, Cassandra was intended to have collected pieces of human history, such as Magna Carta and Harry Potter and the Philosopher's Stone. The book still appears as a set piece, being contained in a glass cabinet decorating the Platform One hotel. Wanamaker reprised the role of Cassandra in the 2006 series' first episode, "New Earth".

=== Filming ===
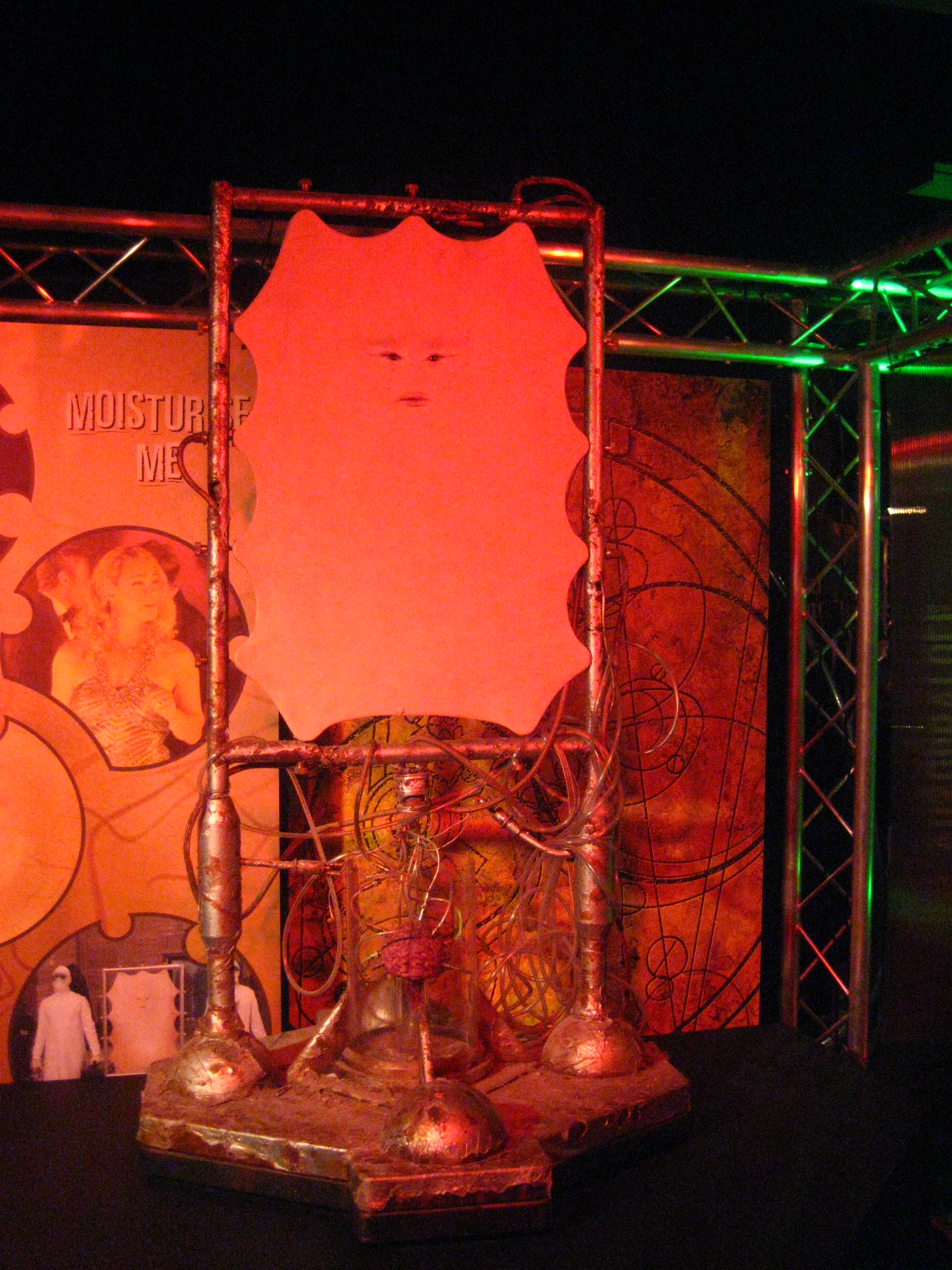
Cassandra was one of the main characters developed, but filming her and animating her speech was difficult.

"The End of the World" was scheduled as part of the second production block along with "The Unquiet Dead". Camille Coduri's scene as Jackie Tyler was shot in advance during the first production block because of commitments for the film The Business that would make her unavailable. The scene was shot at the Unit Q2 warehouse in Newport on 7 September 2004.

The main recording for the episode began in the studio at Unit Q2 from 22 September. Many of the Platform One interiors were filmed at the Temple of Peace in Cardiff from 6 to 14 October.

During the recording of "The Unquiet Dead" on 20 October, several pick-up shots were recorded at Headlands School in Penarth. The main recording on the block concluded in Q2 on 22 October. To help with the convenience of locations, the scenes with the Doctor and Rose on present-day Earth were shot during the third production block on 9 November. Filming took place at Helmont House on Churchill Way, and on Queen Street. Some additional shots involving the air ducts were shot at Q2 on 26 November. The filming of screens with Cassandra proved to be difficult, with one crew member comparing it to pushing around a faulty shopping trolley. Zoë Wanamaker was unable to be present on the set during the filming of her scenes so a stand-in had to be used.

Due to complexities in animating Cassandra, some of her lines were dropped and the episode underran. To compensate, Davies came up with the character of maintenance worker Raffalo, and scenes between Raffalo and Rose were filmed at the Temple of Peace on 19 February 2005.

At a talk in 2018, Euros Lynn chose the final scene of the episode, in which the Doctor and Rose get chips, as one of his favourite scenes from his directorial tenure on Doctor Who. The scene was one of the final shot for the series and none of the people behind the Doctor and Rose were paid extras.

=== Effects and costumes ===
The episode contains 203 visual effects shots that were completed over eight weeks, compared to "about 100" in the film Gladiator; Russell T Davies joked that there never would be an episode of the same scale due to the expense in producing it. As of "The Wedding of River Song" (2011), no Doctor Who episode contains as many special effects shots. Producer Phil Collinson also said the episode had more monsters than ever before.

Both Cassandra and the robotic spiders — other than an inactive one — are completely CGI creatures. According to Russell T Davies, Cassandra was worked on for "many many months" and cost a "fortune". The Moxx of Balhoon was originally going to be animated, but this changed to a "glove puppet" and then a full rubber suit when it was desired he be "chunkier". Actor Jimmy Vee had done similar parts before, although the actor said it was hard filming in the costume, which took three hours to put on. Jabe was originally more tree bark-like in the face, but it was decided that she be a Silver Birch instead.

Other effects include the creation of a fake 7" single for Britney Spears' "Toxic". In the episode, Cassandra unveils an "iPod" (actually a Wurlitzer jukebox), that plays "Tainted Love" by Soft Cell and later "Toxic". Since "Toxic" was not actually released as a 7" 45 rpm vinyl single, the production team mocked up a 7" single for use in the episode.

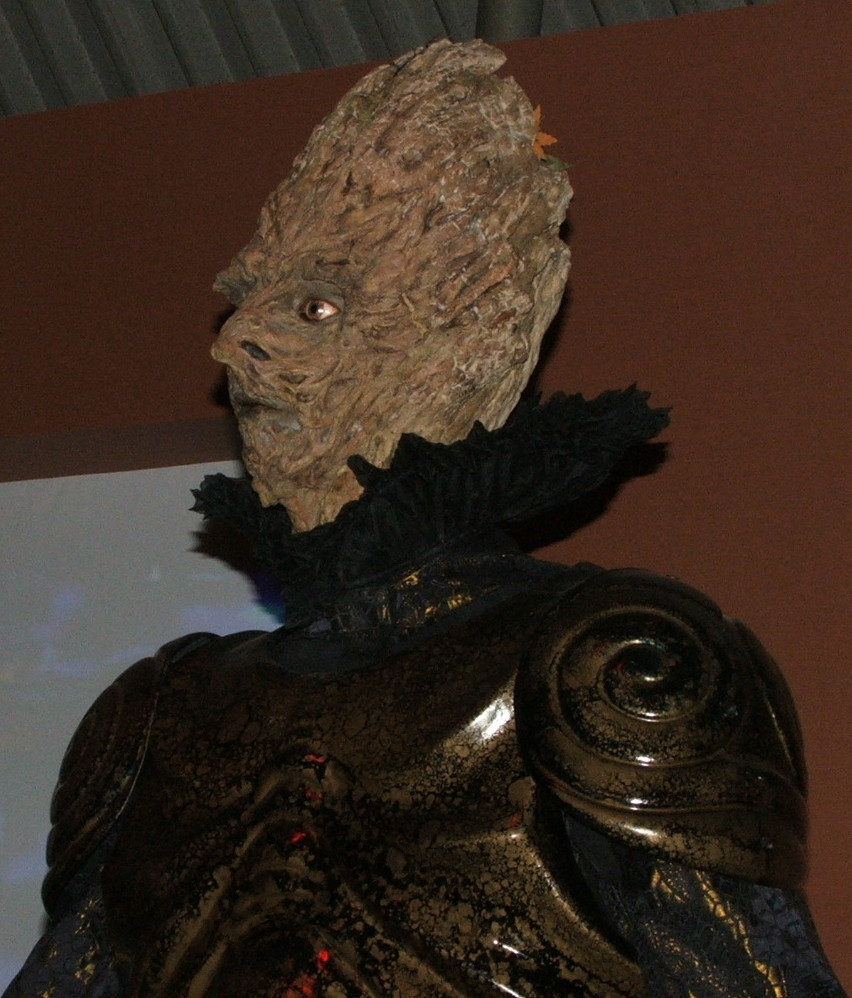
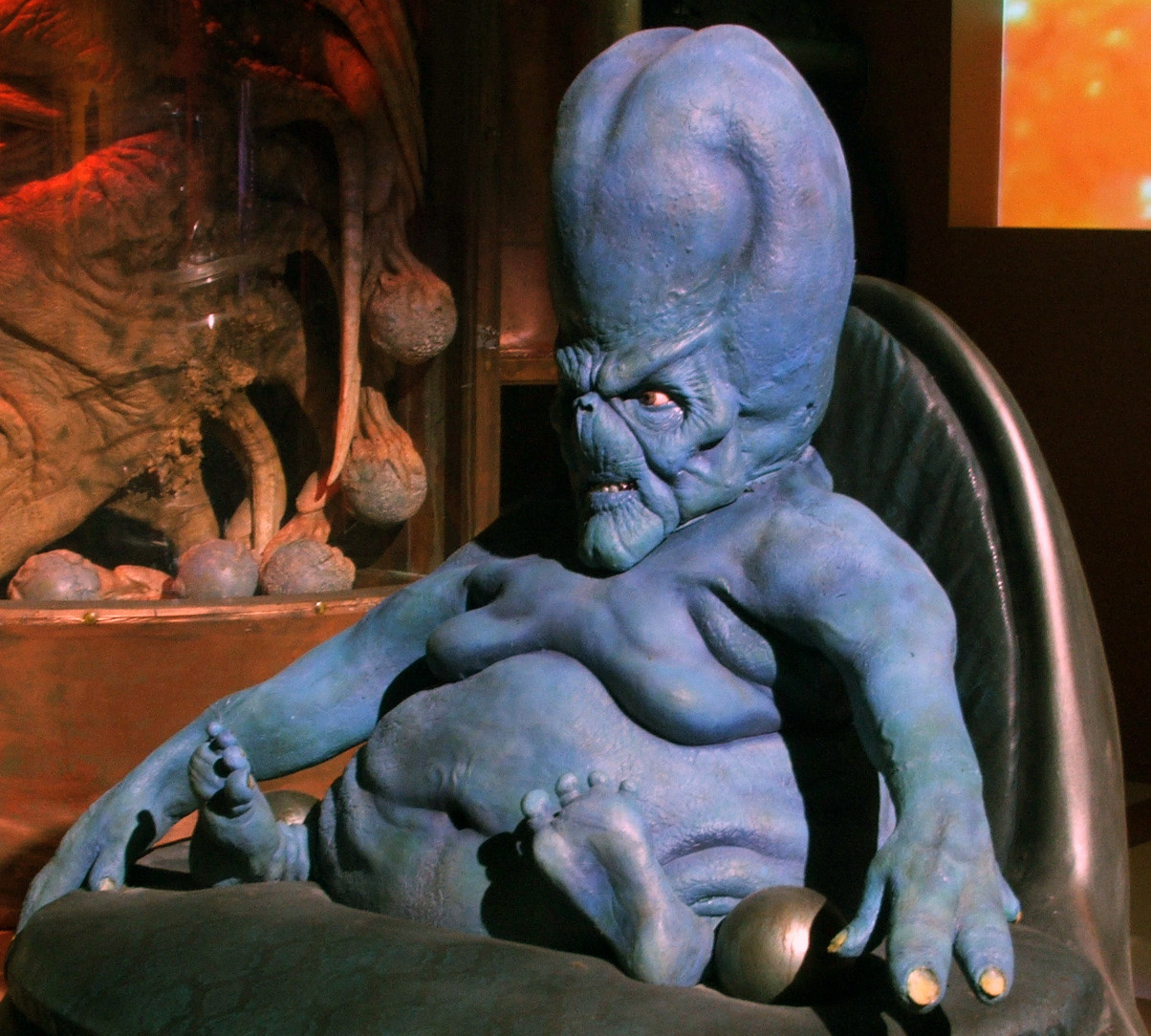
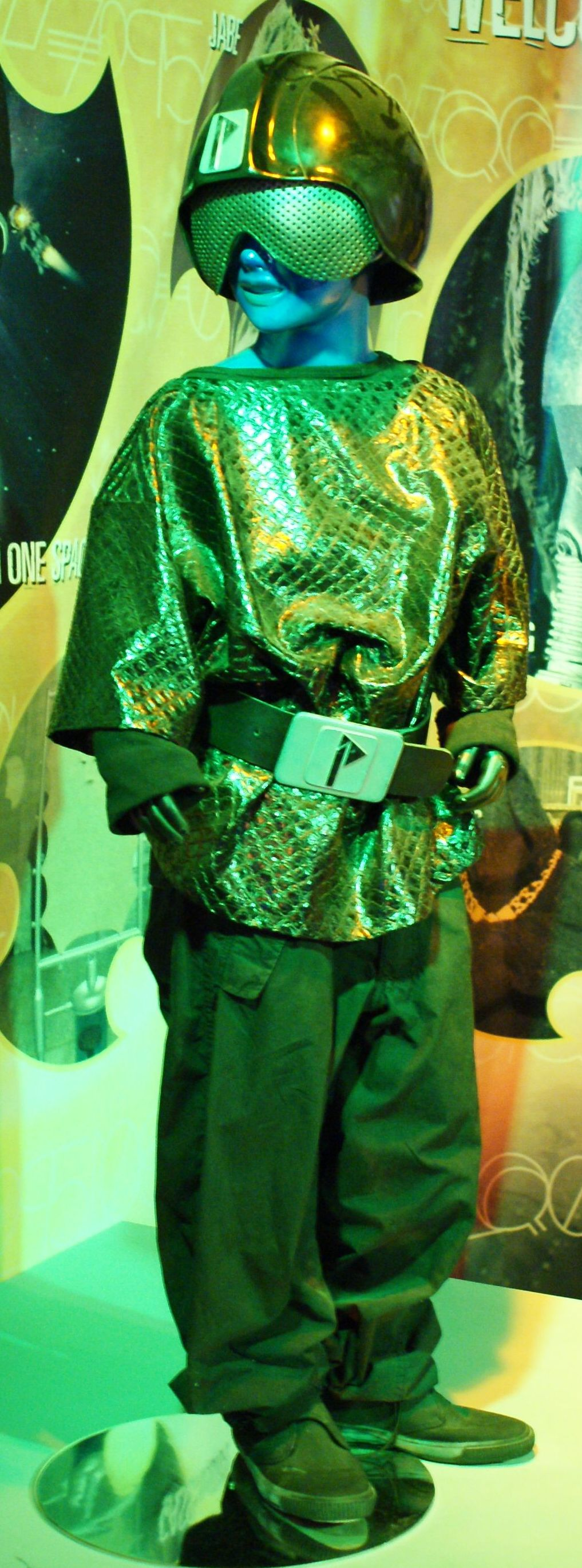
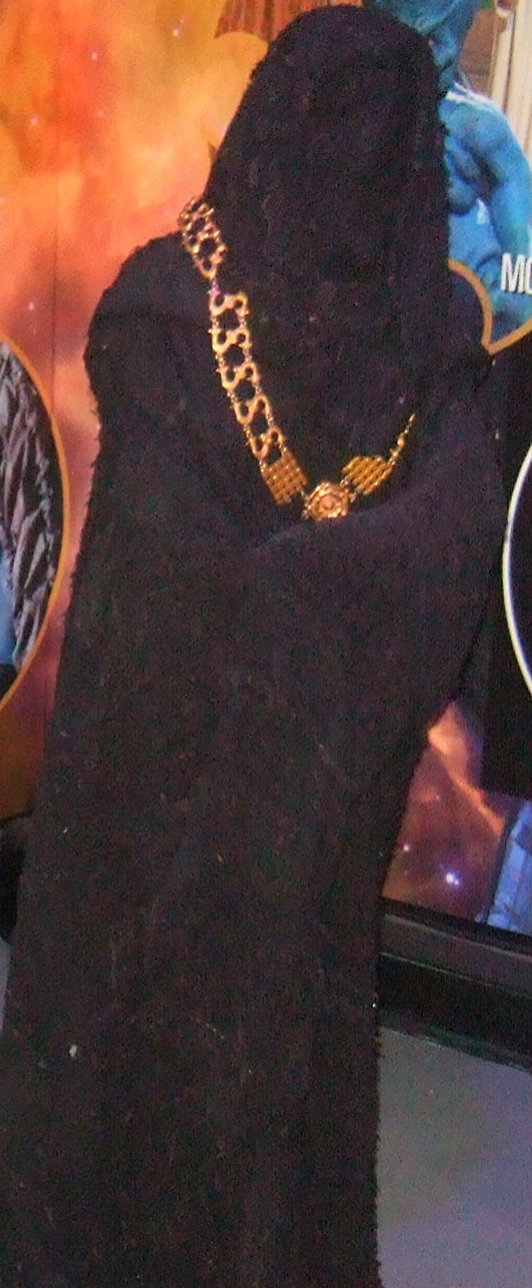
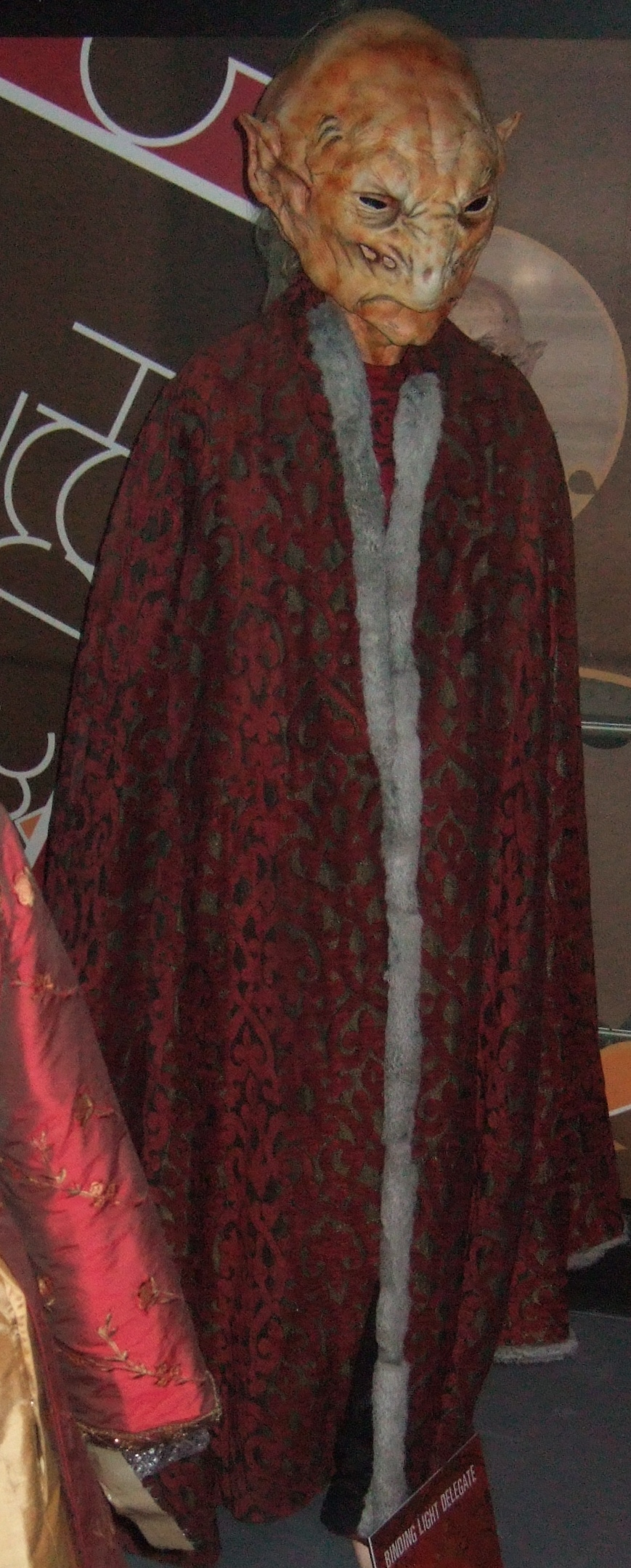
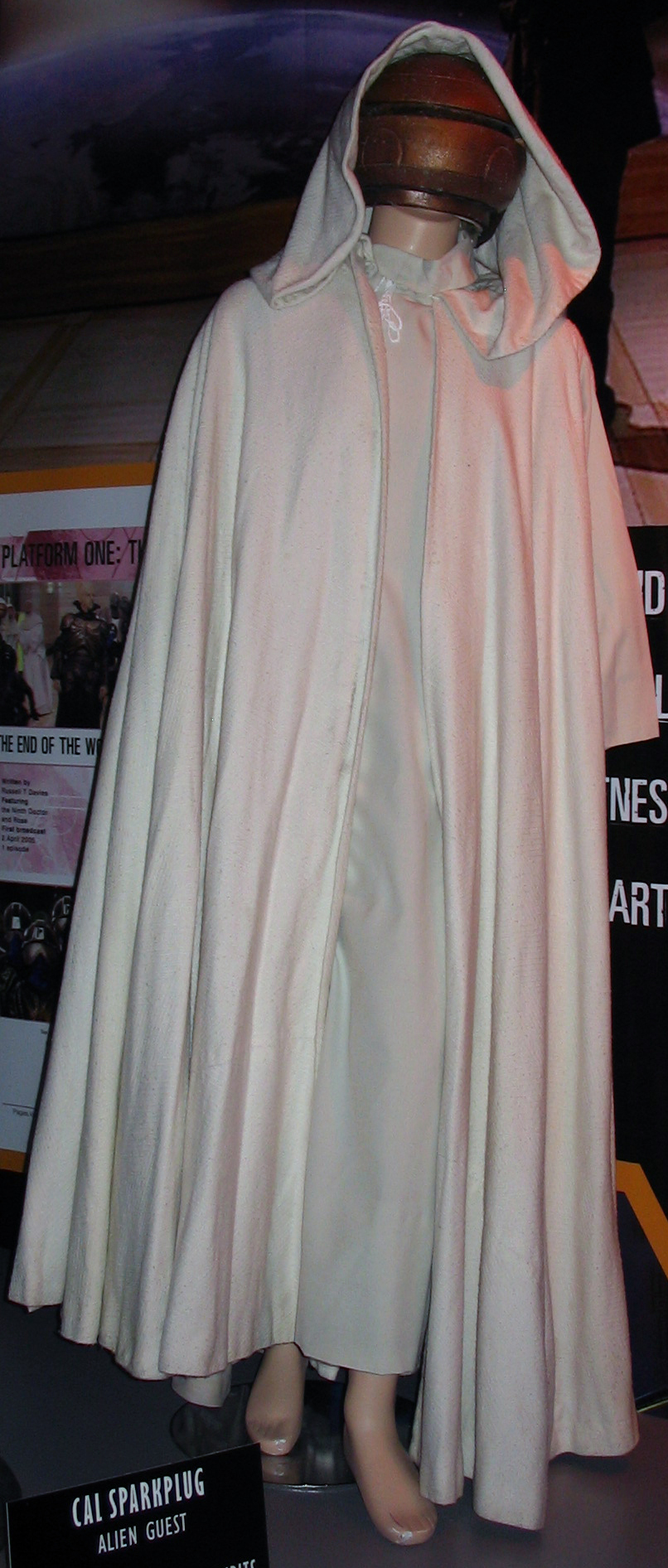
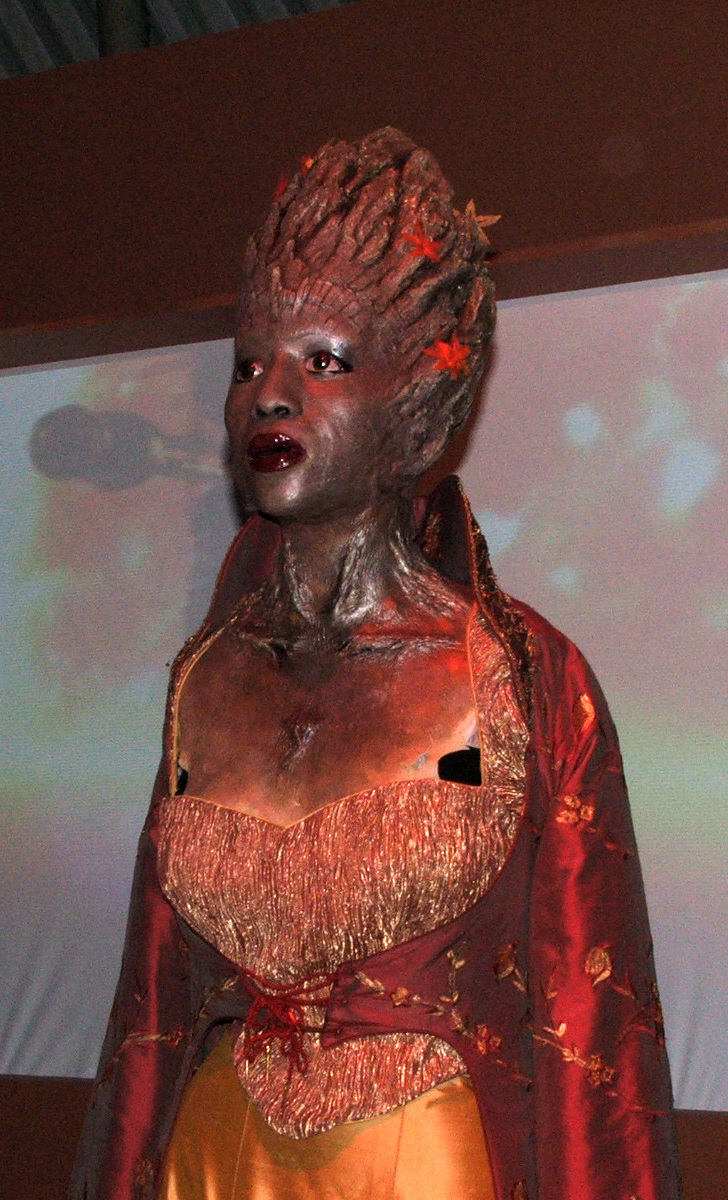
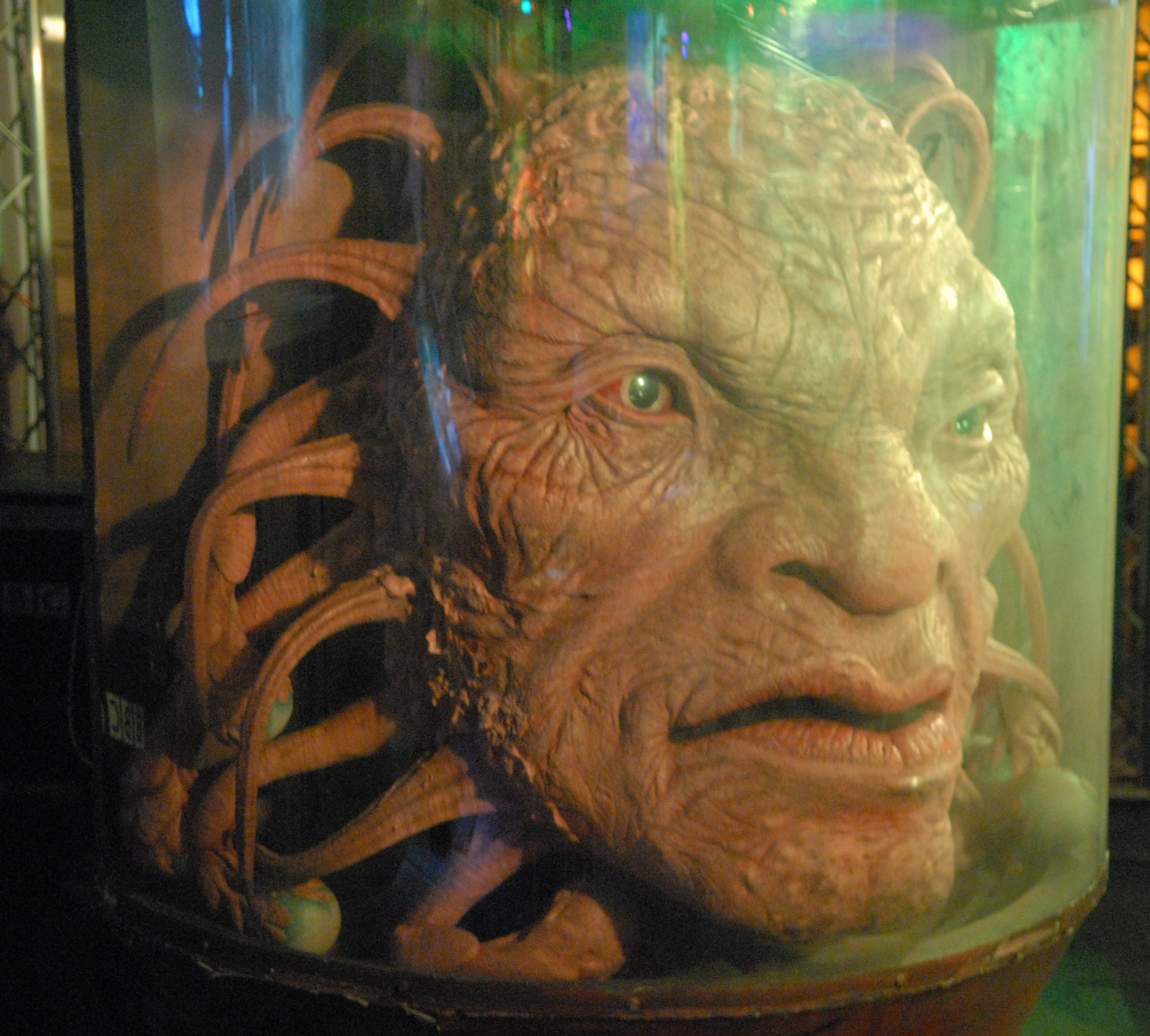
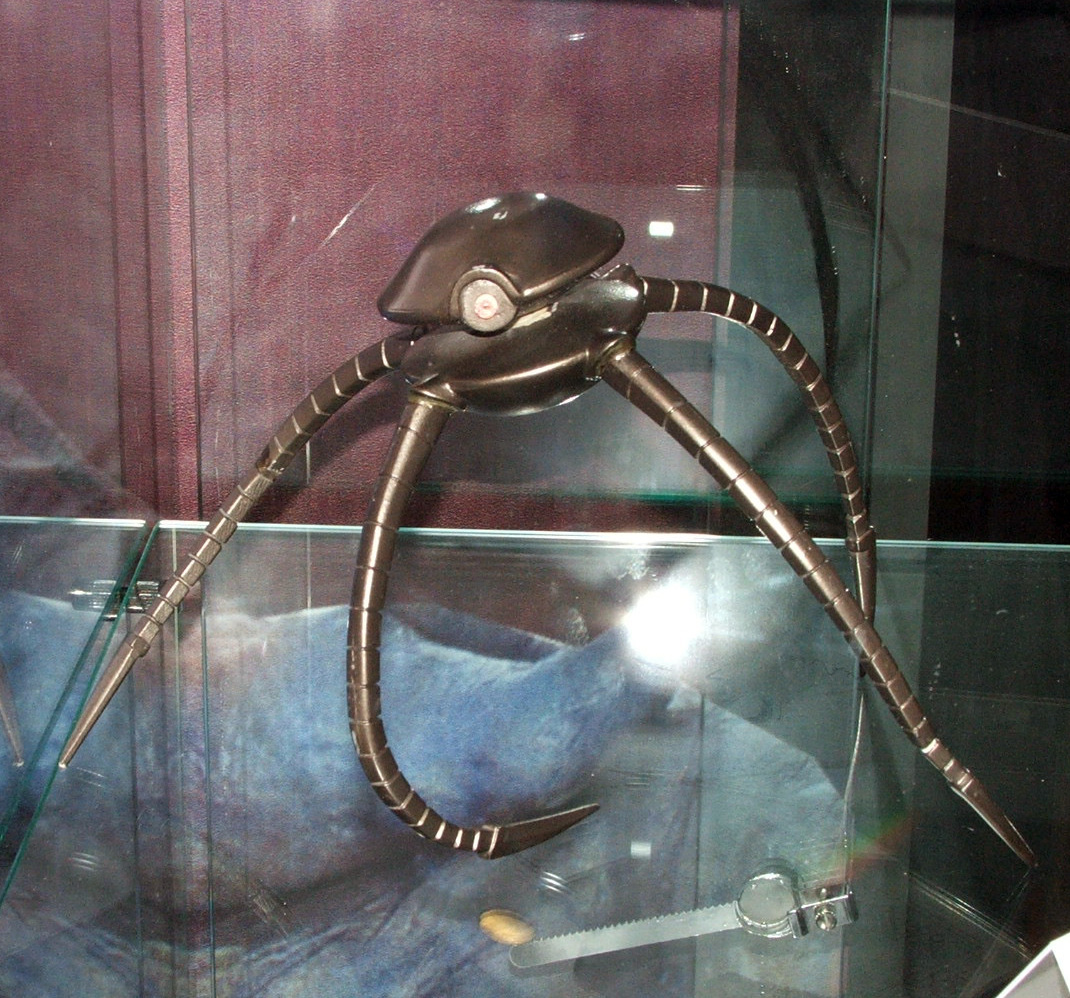
The episode featured many different creatures and props, shown here at various Doctor Who exhibitions.

== Broadcast and reception ==
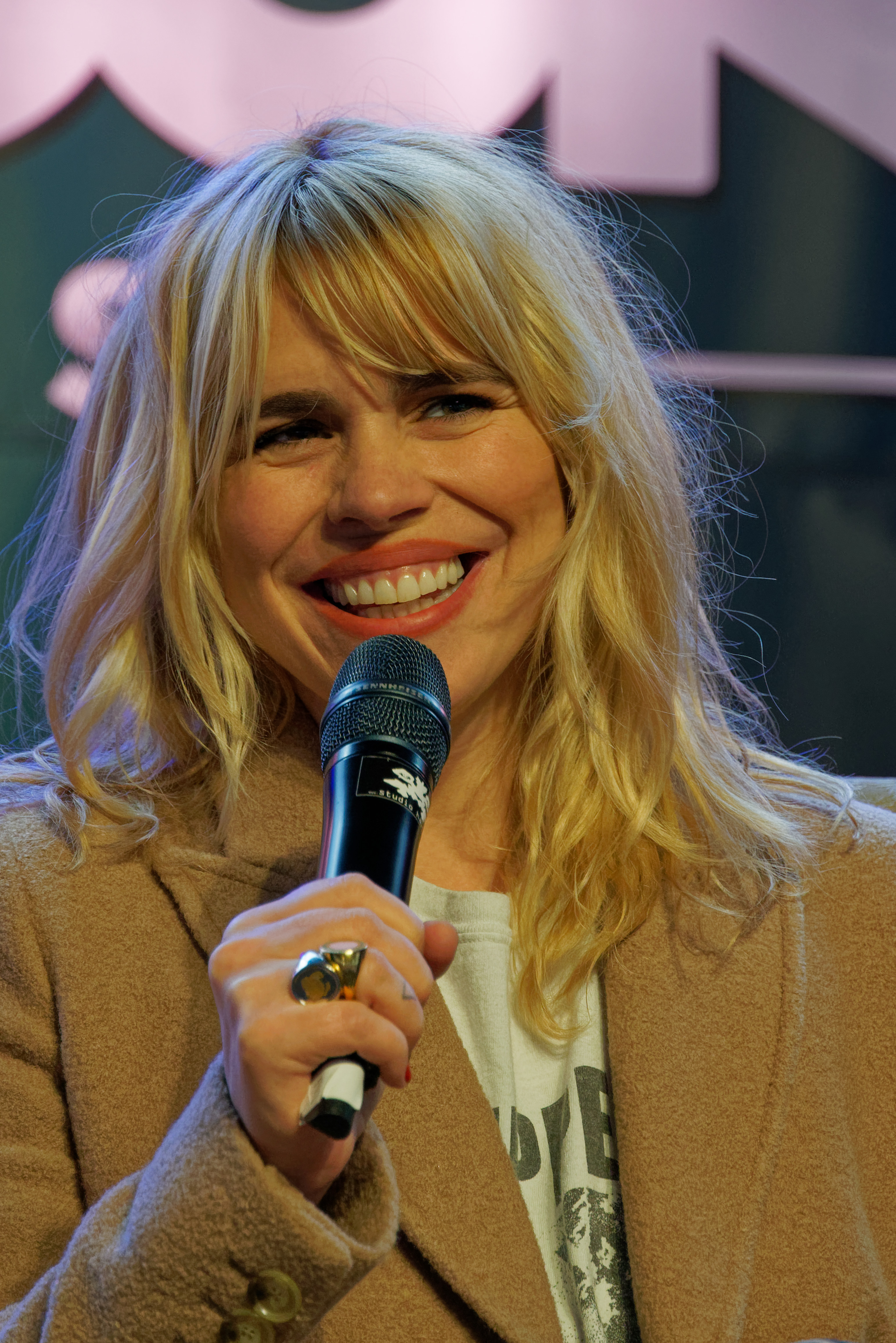
Billie Piper received praise for her performance, with critic Arnold T. Blumberg writing that she "has shown herself to be quite capable of conveying amazingly subtle shifts in emotion" and noting "how valuable a part of this new series Piper really is."

According to a March 2006 interview with Russell T Davies, he requested for this episode to be broadcast back-to-back with "Rose", but the request was given to the BBC too close to transmission to do so. In the United States the Sci-Fi Channel did run the two episodes consecutively on 17 March 2006. The broadcast of "The End of the World" in the US was watched by 1.61 million viewers. In Canada, the episode had 899,000 viewers, making it the evening's 4th-most viewed primetime show.

Overnight figures showed that "The End of the World" was watched by 7.3 million viewers in the UK, down 2.6 million viewers from the premiere. When final ratings were calculated, figures rose to 7.97 million. The episode received an Audience Appreciation Index score of 76, which was the lowest in the show's history until 2015's "Sleep No More".

Arnold T Blumburg of the magazine Now Playing gave "The End of the World" a grade of "A−", praising the spectacle as well as the performances of Eccleston and Piper and their developing characters. However, he felt that the climax suffered from pacing issues. SFX called it a "brave episode to air so early, but it works", praising the way the alien concepts were reminiscent to the classic series. However, the reviewer wrote that "the full drama of the event is never quite captured" and "the murder plot...never quite takes flight, but it provides the framework for some brilliant scenes". In Who Is the Doctor, a guide to the revived series, Graeme Burk described "The End of the World" as "sheer, unadulterated fun", particularly praising the emotional connection that was built between the Doctor and Rose. Burk felt that there could have been more of a build-up to the Cassandra revelation, but commented that "a lot of the success of the story" was due to her. Burk's co-author Robert Smith added that the episode allowed Eccleston to shine by offering the Doctor a wide range of emotions. Despite their positive reviews, Burk and Smith noted that the switch at the end of the hallway with giant fans was "contrived" and "silly". In 2013, Patrick Mulkern of Radio Times felt that the episode had everything to be expected from Davies' Doctor Who: boldness, camp, and emotional and character drama. The A.V. Club reviewer Alasdair Wilkins gave the episode a grade of B+, noting that the episode was not concerned with plot, but it succeeded in character moments and reintroducing Doctor Who.
