= Cassandra (Doctor Who) =

Fictional character from Doctor Who

- Doctor Who character
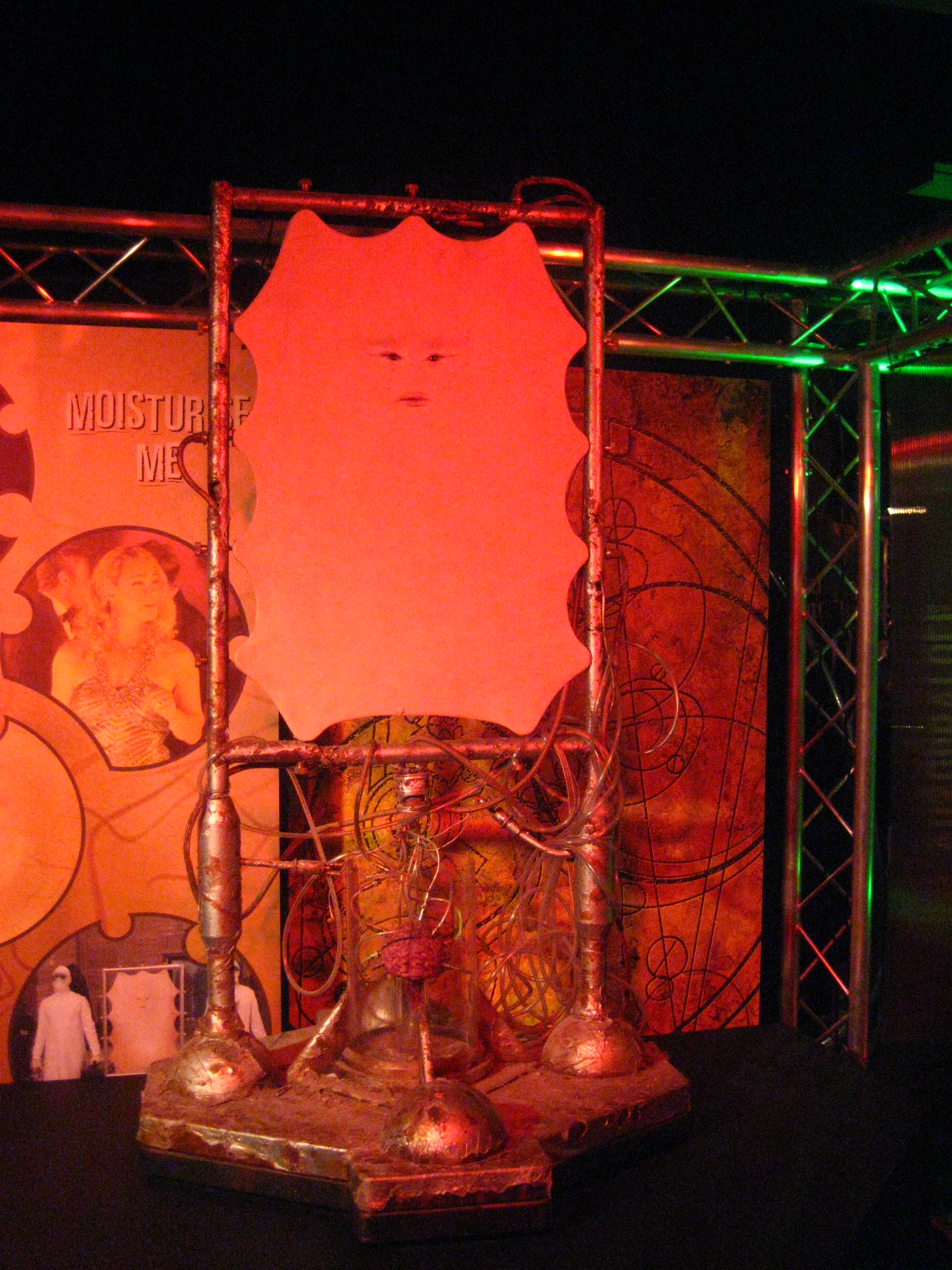
- A physical prop of Cassandra, on display at the Doctor Who Experience
- First appearance: "The End of the World" (2005)
- Created by: Russell T Davies
- Portrayed by: Zoë Wanamaker

In-universe information
- Species: Human
- Gender: Trans woman

Lady Cassandra O'Brien.Δ17 ("dot Delta Seventeen") is a fictional character in the British science fiction television series Doctor Who. Portrayed by actress Zoë Wanamaker, Cassandra is a human who has undergone so many plastic surgeries in an attempt to become more beautiful that she is now just a stretched piece of skin on a frame. Cassandra first appears in the 2005 episode "The End of the World", where she attempts to sabotage a viewing party for the destruction of the planet Earth in order to obtain more money to fund further surgeries. Cassandra is seemingly destroyed, but later re-appears in the 2006 episode "New Earth", where she possesses the body of the Doctor's companion Rose Tyler. Cassandra is eventually forced out of Rose's body into another body, which begins to die. The Doctor takes Cassandra back in time to see her past self, and she dies in her past self's arms.

Cassandra was created by then-showrunner Russell T Davies, who was inspired to create Cassandra by drastic beauty treatments that female celebrities had undergone. Cassandra was an entirely CGI-animated creation, which proved to be troublesome for the production team. The popularity of the setting of "The End of the World", as well as Davies's personal fondness for the character, resulted in her re-appearance in "New Earth". To prevent issues with the CGI animation used in her prior appearance, Cassandra was made to possess others throughout the episode, minimising the time her CGI appearance was on-screen.

Cassandra has received a largely positive response since her debut. She has been analysed for the real-world commentary and symbolism present in her character, as well as for the series' depiction of her as "inhuman" despite her human origins.

== Appearances ==
Doctor Who is a long-running British science-fiction television series that began in 1963. It stars its protagonist, The Doctor, an alien who travels through time and space in a ship known as the TARDIS, as well as their travelling companions. When the Doctor dies, they can undergo a process known as "regeneration", completely changing the Doctor's appearance and personality. Throughout their travels, the Doctor often comes into conflict with various alien species and antagonists.

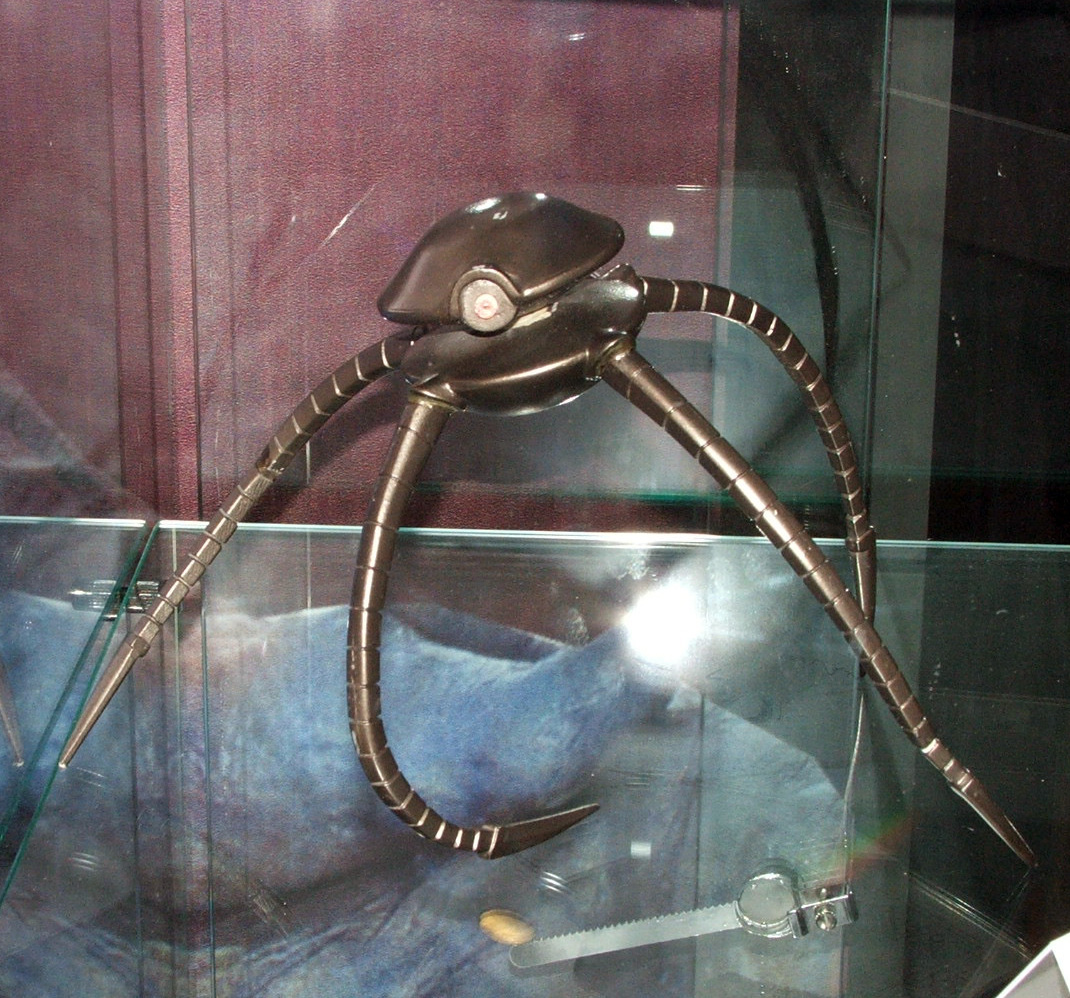
One of the robot spiders Cassandra uses in "The End of the World", on display at the Doctor Who Experience

Cassandra (Zoë Wanamaker) first appears in the 2005 episode "The End of the World". A transgender woman who hails from Texas in the far future, Cassandra underwent many plastic surgery operations, eventually being reduced to a single stretched piece of skin on a metal frame. Cassandra is driven by a sense of vanity, desiring beauty above all else, which is why she constantly undergoes surgeries.

In "The End of the World", Cassandra is one of many guests at an event to view the destruction of the Earth by its expanding sun; secretly, she has also infiltrated the event with a number of robotic spiders, which sabotage the viewing platform. Intending to make it seem as though the event was a hostage situation so she could use the compensation money to fund further surgeries, Cassandra is forced to change her plans after the Ninth Doctor (Christopher Eccleston) reveals her scheme. Cassandra lowers the viewing platform's heat shields and teleports away, intending for those on-board to be killed by the sun's heat, but the Doctor is able to re-activate the shields. The Doctor teleports her back on-board, where she dries out and explodes due to the heat brought on from the sun while the shields were down.

She subsequently appears in 2006's "New Earth". Having repaired the damages to her body with new skin, Cassandra lay hiding in the basement of a hospital on the planet New Earth with her clone servant, Chip (Sean Gallagher), where she constantly re-watches a recording of the last party where she was called beautiful thousands of years prior. Discovering the Tenth Doctor (David Tennant) and his companion Rose Tyler (Billie Piper) on the planet, the latter of whom Cassandra had also previously met at the viewing platform, she lures Rose to the basement, where Cassandra uses a device to possess Rose's body. The Doctor and Cassandra discover the hospital's Catkind nurses have been hiding human clones in the hospital's basement, the nurses infecting the clones with diseases in order to find cures. The Doctor figures out Cassandra has possessed Rose, and Cassandra frees the clones, resulting in a hospital-wide pandemic as the clones begin to infect others in a zombie-like manner. She subsequently helps the Doctor cure the clones of their ailments to stop them from infecting both herself and others, constantly swapping between Rose and the Doctor's bodies. After the clones are cured, the Doctor forces her out of Rose's body and into Chip's body. Chip's clone body begins to die, and the Doctor and Rose take her back in time to the party Cassandra had been watching. Cassandra, in Chip's body, calls her past self beautiful before dying in her arms.

Cassandra also appears in the short story Lives of the Rich and Thin, published as part of the 2005 book Monsters and Villains. The short story depicts her early life.

== Conception and design ==
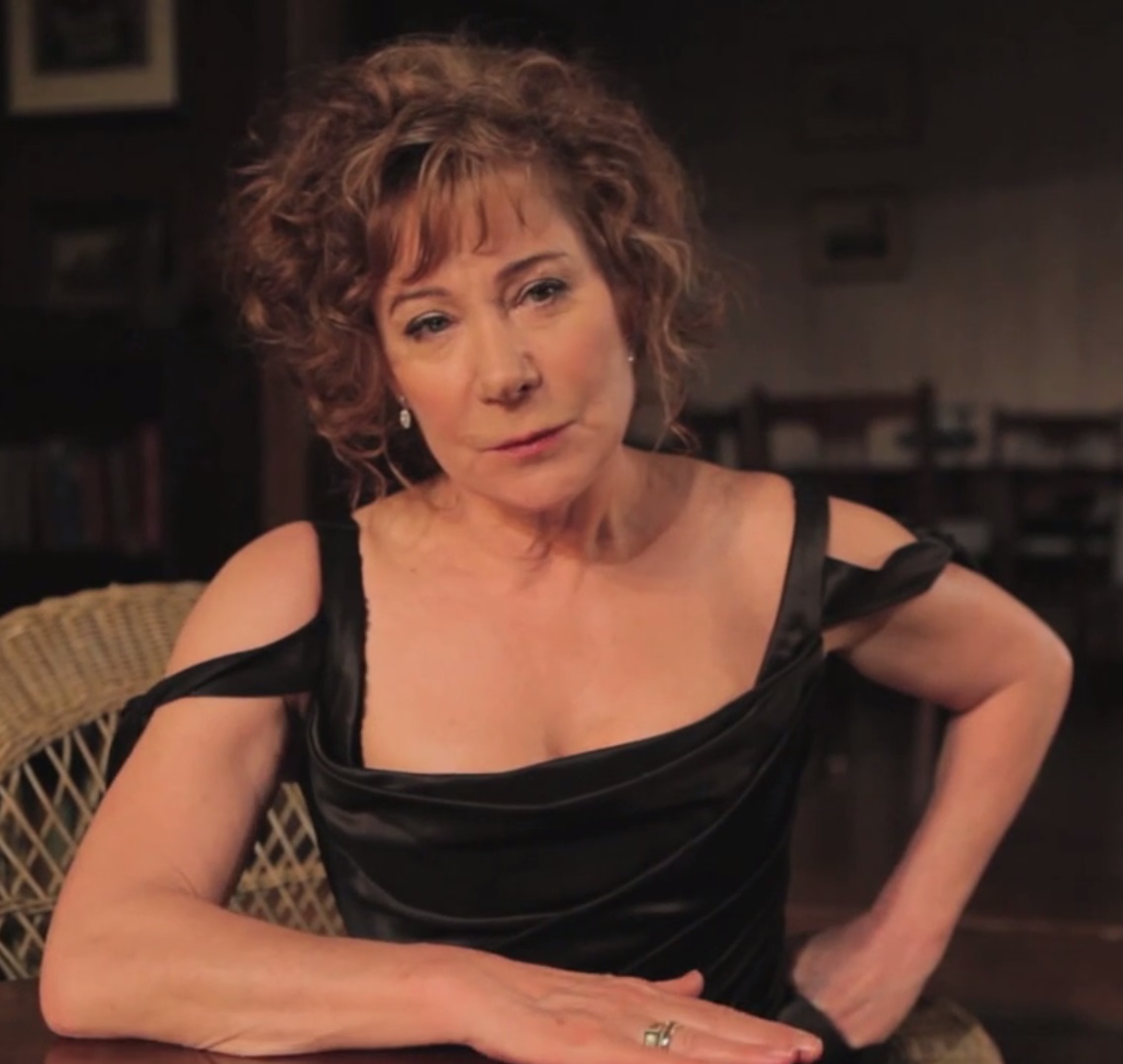
Zoë Wanamaker in 2013

Cassandra was created by showrunner Russell T Davies, who also wrote her debut episode "The End of the World". Davies stated that Cassandra was inspired by drastic beauty treatments that had been taken by female celebrities; he was particularly inspired by the appearance of various celebrities at the Oscars. He said: "It was horrific seeing those beautiful women reduced to sticks. Nicole Kidman struck me in particular. Nicole is one of the most beautiful women in the world. But she looks horrifying because she's so thin." Davies was also inspired by the cosmetic surgery given to the character Ida Lowry in the 1985 film Brazil. The initial sketch for Cassandra's design was done by Davies and refined by designer Matthew Savage.

Cassandra is an entirely CGI creation and is voiced by actress Zoë Wanamaker. Cassandra's physical body during filming was depicted with both a "stunt" face and a green-screen in place of her skin, depending on the shot. Filming with these methods proved to be difficult. Wanamaker was unable to be present on the set during the filming of her scenes so a stand-in had to be used for Cassandra's lines. Wanamaker would voice all of Cassandra's dialogue in post-production, and was also filmed during recording to provide a visual reference for Cassandra's face to the CGI animators. According to Davies, Cassandra's animation was worked on for "many many months" and cost a "fortune". Due to complexities in animating Cassandra, some of her lines were cut, resulting in the episode under-running. A new scene had to be added to make up for this loss.

Noticing how the press and viewers had latched on to the setting depicted in "The End of the World", Davies sought to make visits to the same period a recurring occasion for the series, starting with "New Earth". Davies had grown attached to Cassandra after writing a short story for her in the book Monsters and Villains, and also saw the inclusion of Cassandra as being able to provide a familiar "bridge" for younger viewers, who would be unfamiliar and unsure of David Tennant's recently introduced Tenth Doctor. To reduce the issues that had stemmed from Cassandra's CGI depiction, Davies decided to have Cassandra body-hop into Rose and the Doctor's bodies, which minimised the amount of time the CGI model was on-screen. It also allowed both Billie Piper (who portrays Rose Tyler) and Tennant a chance to perform comedically, which they did not get to do much in the series otherwise. When portraying the Cassandra-possessed Rose, Piper wore a more vivid shade of lipstick and emphasised her figure with a wonderbra. Wanamaker reprised her voice role as Cassandra, and additionally depicted Cassandra's human appearance when the group travel back to see Cassandra's past self. As with her prior appearance, her recording of Cassandra's lines was filmed to aid the CGI animators.

Cassandra's catchphrase was "Moisturize me!". Cassandra has a musical cue when she appears in a scene, characterised by the book New Dimensions of Doctor Who: Adventures in Space, Time and Television as a "delicate waltz with the melody entrusted to a high-pitched theremin".

== Reception and analysis ==
Graeme Burk, in the book Who Is the Doctor: The Unofficial Guide to Doctor Who: The New Series, praised Cassandra's role in "The End of the World", citing much of the episode's success to her unique, campy presence as a villain. He opined that Cassandra's presence was also thematic as it symbolised how all things, even humans, had to die one day. Burk also highlighted Cassandra's death scene in "New Earth", believing that it symbolised the suffering brought on by over-extending one's life; despite Cassandra living for thousands of years after the events of her future self's death, the party was the last time she was called beautiful, and those thousands of years were nothing but suffering for her. His co-writer, Stacey Smith?, also positively highlighted Wannamaker's performance as Cassandra in the episode. Alasdair Wilkins, writing for The A.V. Club, praised the performances of Piper, Tennant, and Gallagher's performances when possessed by Cassandra, though felt some of the cultural references made by Cassandra while possessing Rose were confusing to those unfamiliar with British culture.

Erica Moore, in the book Impossible Worlds, Impossible Things: Cultural Perspectives on Doctor Who, Torchwood and The Sarah Jane Adventures, stated that Cassandra acted as a commentary on those who underwent operations to appear more beautiful, with the character's "non-sensical" views on thinness showing how beauty standards are constructed by the culture a person hails from. Marc DiPaolo, writing in Political Satire and British-American Relations in Five Decades of Doctor Who, considered Cassandra an example of how Doctor Who characterised Americans as being more invested in "the trappings of consumer culture" than they were about protecting the planet. The book Doctor Who - Twelfth Night: Adventures in Time and Space with Peter Capaldi criticised Cassandra, writing that her characterisation as "vain and surgery-obsessed" did not challenge pre-existing negative stereotypes regarding transgender women, leading to a more negative fan depiction of transgender women in the series following this.

The book The Greatest Show in the Galaxy: The Discerning Fan's Guide to Doctor Who compared Cassandra to fellow Doctor Who antagonist the Cybermen, a race of formerly-human emotionless cyborgs, in how both had lost their humanity through surgeries, albeit in different manners. The book New Dimensions of Doctor Who: Adventures in Space, Time and Television analysed how Cassandra's associated musical theme codes Cassandra as being "alien", despite the character insisting she is a human. Moore stated that the portrayal of Cassandra as an "inhuman" figure in "The End of the World", in conjunction with her commentary on beauty standards, helped indicate to viewers that there was inherently something wrong in how these beauty standards were portrayed in contemporary times. Moore believed that Cassandra was a warning to viewers of what they could become if "the border between cultural trend and cultural harm is not enforced".
