= Edinburgh Festival Fringe 1960 =

The 1960 Edinburgh Festival Fringe was the 14th Edinburgh Festival Fringe. The Fringe ran from 21 August to 10 September 1960.

== Background ==
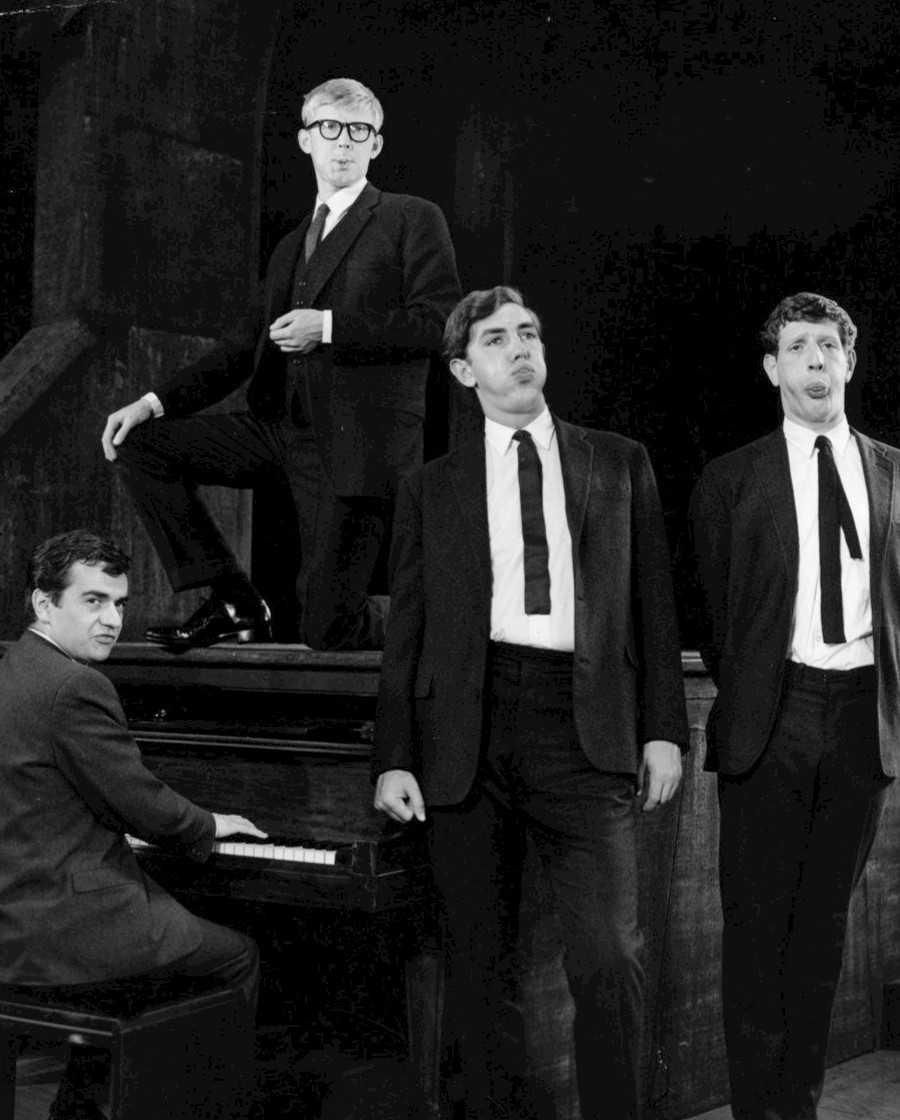
Beyond the Fringe original cast (from left: Moore, Bennett, Cook, Miller)

The Fringe Society's first President was Michael Imison from the Oxford Theatre Group, who had first initiated the formation of the Fringe Society in 1958. The way the Fringe Society communicated about the activities of all the Fringe Groups was through the publishing of the Fringe Programme which ran from 24 to 32 pages depending on the number of groups taking part each year.

1960 was also the year when Alan Bennett, Dudley Moore, Peter Cook and Jonathan Miller first performed at the Royal Lyceum Theatre in Beyond the Fringe, "a production that ushered in a new age of British political satire".

The show was actually part of the Edinburgh International Festival but its title, intended as a rebuttal to the ever-expanding Fringe, ironically helped publicise the Fringe.

== 1960 Fringe highlights ==
Ric Throssell's play, The Day Before Tomorrow, was performed by the London Playgoers Club in a hall in Hill Street, Edinburgh. The play was about the aftermath of an atomic explosion and the difficulties of post-explosion survival. As the Campaign for Nuclear Disarmament (CND) was at its peak during this period, the play resonated with its audiences and made it one of the highlights of the 1960 Edinburgh Fringe.

The Scotsman also highlighted "In the World- My Canvas", a play about the life of Vincent van Gogh by Ruth Dixon. Their review describes Dixon "penned a vivid picture in over 40 scenes of the man who said, 'I want to paint humanity, humanity and again humanity.'"

Less well received was a play by Bill Owen, entitled Fringe of Light, an Osbornesque drama. The review of the play was entitled "Audience of 20 numbed" where the review reveals that the script was seized and examined by the police before the show was even allowed to go on. That it was allowed to go on was a misjudgment according to the reviewer:

The plot is wearisome and abstruse; centring on the vapourings of Sara, a young girl, whose author husband has run off with a woman publisher. Characters keep rushing on and off stage; doors slam, voices screech. It is all very confusing.
