= The Ark (Doctor Who) =

023 – The Ark
- Doctor Who serial
- The characters discover the human statue has been built as a Monoid, in a scene considered one of the show's best cliffhangers.

Cast
- Doctor: William Hartnell – First Doctor
- Companions: Peter Purves – Steven Taylor; Jackie Lane – Dodo Chaplet
- Others: Eric Elliott – Commander; Inigo Jackson – Zentos; Roy Spencer – Manyak; Kate Newman – Mellium; Edmund Coulter, Frank George, Ralph Carrigan, John Caesar – Monoids; Michael Sheard – Rhos; Ian Frost – Baccu; Stephanie Heesom, Paul Greenhalgh – Guardians; Terence Woodfield – Maharis; Terence Bayler – Yendom; Brian Wright – Dassuk; Eileen Helsby – Venussa; Roy Skelton, John Halstead – Monoid Voices; Richard Beale – Refusian Voice

Production
- Directed by: Michael Imison
- Written by: Paul Erickson; Lesley Scott
- Script editor: Gerry Davis
- Produced by: John Wiles
- Music by: Tristram Cary (Note: Re-use of music from The Daleks)
- Production code: X
- Series: Season 3
- Running time: 4 episodes, 25 minutes each
- First broadcast: 5 March 1966
- Last broadcast: 26 March 1966

Chronology
← Preceded by The Massacre	Followed by → The Celestial Toymaker

The Ark is the sixth serial of the third season of the British science fiction television series Doctor Who. Written by Paul Erickson and Lesley Scott and directed by Michael Imison, it was broadcast on BBC1 in four weekly parts from 5 to 26 March 1966. In the serial, the First Doctor (William Hartnell) and his travelling companions, Steven Taylor (Peter Purves) and Dodo Chaplet (Jackie Lane), arrive on a generation ship as it begins a 700-year voyage fleeing Earth's imminent destruction. They return at the end of its voyage to discover the humans have become subservient to their slave race, the Monoids.

Producer John Wiles conceived of the spaceship, and story editor Donald Tosh developed a storyline with Erickson, who wrote the scripts. Erickson later requested that Scott, his then-partner, be co-credited; she was the first woman to receive a writing credit on Doctor Who. Imison wanted The Ark to be impressive; its expenses drew budget from other serials. Filming took place at Riverside Studios from February to March 1966. It was Wiles's last credited work on the series, and Dodo's first journey as a companion to the Doctor.

The Ark received an average of 6.4 million viewers across the four episodes, marking the first time the programme failed to chart in the weekly top 100 since the first episode in 1963, though it gradually increased. Contemporary and retrospective reviews were generally positive, with praise for the direction, design, and effects, though the design of the Monoids received some criticism. The story was novelised by Erickson in 1986, and the serial was released on VHS, DVD, and as an audiobook.

== Plot ==
Around ten million years in the future, the TARDIS materialises on a vast spacecraft with its own small zoo and arboretum. The First Doctor, Steven Taylor, and their new companion, Dodo Chaplet, discover that Earth is about to be destroyed by the Sun's expansion; the spacecraft has begun a 700-year voyage to the planet Refusis II, fleeing with humans stored in their millions in miniaturised form. Dodo likens the ship to Noah's Ark. It is commanded by human Guardians, while menial work is undertaken by Monoids, a race of mute, one-eyed creatures. During the journey, a gigantic human statue is being hand-carved.

Dodo shows symptoms of the cold; the disease fatally spreads though the ship as the humans and Monoids have no natural immunity. The Ark's Commander collapses and his deputy Zentos assumes control. The TARDIS crew are accused of deliberately infecting the ship's inhabitants; after a trial, Zentos orders their execution. The ailing Commander intervenes, allowing the Doctor to devise a cure. He creates a vaccine from animal membranes and administers it to the infected, who all recover. The group observe Earth's destruction on the scanner before the Doctor, Steven, and Dodo depart in the TARDIS.

The TARDIS returns to the Ark at the end of its voyage. The travellers find the giant statue completed but in the form of a Monoid. They discover that the Monoids, enabled by electronic voice communicators, have taken control while the human descendants, genetically weakened by the cold virus, are now slaves. The Monoid leader takes the Doctor and Dodo to Refusis II. They discover a castle occupied by the Refusians, giant beings rendered invisible by solar flares. The Monoids plan to colonise Refusis II and abandon the human slaves on the Ark, to be killed by a bomb concealed within the statue.

After landing on the planet, a faction of Monoids, uncertain of its viability, begin a revolt. Steven leads the humans in an escape from the Ark; on the planet, they discover the Monoids engaged in a civil war. A Refusian jettisons the statue from the Ark before the bomb explodes. The Refusians agree to share their planet with the colonists, but demand that the humans and Monoids agree to live in peace. The Doctor and his companions depart. In the TARDIS, the Doctor suddenly becomes invisible, and declares that they are under attack.

== Production ==
=== Conception and writing ===
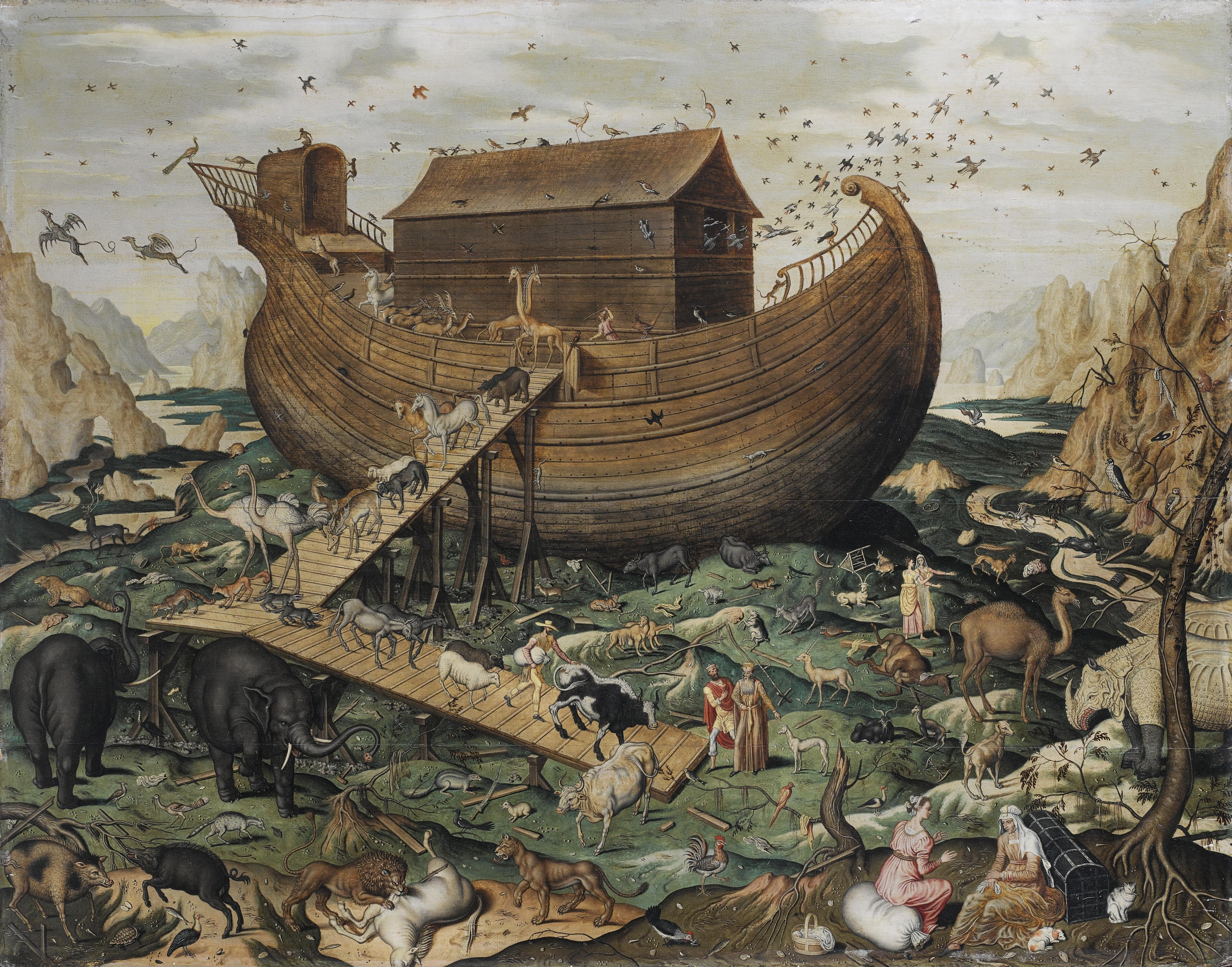
The serial's name refers to the Biblical narrative of Noah's Ark.

Doctor Who producer John Wiles conceived of a story set on a spaceship large enough to house forests and require vehicles for traversal—roughly the size of South London—and developed the idea of an interstellar ark. After joining the series in May 1965, story editor Donald Tosh was concerned the idea was too ambitious, comparing it to the work of writer Arthur C. Clarke. Tosh developed a storyline with Paul Erickson, whom he formally commissioned for a four-part serial on 27 May; the first two scripts were due on 1 September, followed by the last two on 1 November. The story was pushed further back into the third season (but retained the same production dates) after restructuring due to the twelve-part serial The Daleks' Master Plan; it was originally assigned the production code Y but reallocated X.

Erickson delivered the first two scripts on 18 August and 1 September, respectively, under the umbrella title The Ark. Their length and complexity required rewriting by Tosh; he discussed the scripts with Erickson and Wiles on 7 September, and Erickson made changes the following day. Among the most significant changes was the removal of Katarina, a companion who joined the Doctor during the Trojan War in The Myth Makers; Tosh felt the historical character was ill-fitted in futuristic settings, and The Daleks' Master Plan was altered to add her death. Erickson delivered the third and fourth scripts on 30 September and 1 November, and all four revised scripts by 18 November. The Ark was retroactively considered the only unaltered story of Wiles and Tosh's working partnership; they had inherited the previous stories from their predecessors, while the following stories were changed by their successors.

The Ark was Wiles's last credited work on Doctor Who; he sought more active writing and directing work, especially after the extensive production of The Daleks' Master Plan, and his relationship with lead actor William Hartnell had become strained due to their differing ideas about storylines. He resigned in early January 1966 to work freelance; his successor, Innes Lloyd, shadowed Wiles during filming for The Ark. Tosh accepted Erickson's scripts on 4 January and resigned shortly thereafter, handing over to Gerry Davis. On 20 January, Erickson's agent requested that the serial's writer credit be amended to add Lesley Scott, Erickson's then-partner, as co-writer without fee; the scripts' original copyright is attributed solely to Erickson, and in later years he refused to comment on the credit, referring to it as a "personal arrangement". Scott was the first woman to receive a writing credit on Doctor Who.

Michael Imison was assigned the serial's director. He had known Wiles during their time as story editors, though he was initially reserved about being assigned to Doctor Who due to his relationship with head of serials Gerald Savory, who he felt had unassigned him the BBC2 adaptation of Buddenbrooks as Savory's wife, actress Annette Carell, had criticised his directing style. Imison started pre-production on The Ark on 6 December 1965. He worked with Erickson to revise the scripts, which he had found uninspiring; he never met Scott. Imison wanted the serial to be impressive, creating complex storyboards and camera scripts; he later said he was likely "deliberately trying to show off". Savings were made on the next serial, The Celestial Toymaker, to accommodate The Ark's expenses. To save money on an original score, around nine minutes of Tristram Cary's music from The Daleks were used, as well as some stock drum tracks by Robert Famon. The Ark was Erickson and Imison's only work on Doctor Who.

=== Design and costumes ===
The serial's design work was assigned to Barry Newbery—his first science-fiction work for the series. He conceived the Ark in a spherical design in reference to Albert Einstein's theory of general relativity; he felt it was appropriate given the spaceship creates its own gravity. The gates in the Refusians' castle had previously been used by Newbery in The Crusade. He later recalled being unhappy working on the serial due to the busy production; its extensive design work delayed Newbery's work on the upcoming story The Gunfighters. The invisible (Note: All of the non-historical Doctor Who serials produced or commissioned by Tosh and Wiles featured invisibility in some manner.) Refusian was represented by hidden wires and stagehands, while the jungle's humidity was represented by dry ice mist. Many of the jungle's plants were in pots, which were hidden by the camera angles. The statue in the last three episodes was a 2-foot-tall (61 cm) figurine by sculptor John Friedlander. Based on their monocular nature, Imison altered and renamed the Monoids, which the scripts named "Reptiles"; he suspected their merchandising potential.

Costume designer Daphne Dare created the Ark's costumes in pastel shades: blue and white for the men, pink and white for women, and red for the Commander. With suggestions by Imison, she designed the Monoid costumes as a one-piece outfit, with a zip at the back; the fastener was hidden by the back of the mask. Yak hair of varying colours was used for the wigs, which hid the actors' faces. Eight costumes were designed by freelance effects team Jack and John Lovell. The eyeballs were created with ping pong balls; in four of the costumes, the performers could move the eye with their tongues via a peg. Dare recalled that the costumes were hot and uncomfortable for the actors. The numbers on the creatures' collars were changed between shots to imply a greater population than shown on screen, and editing techniques were used to exaggerate each side's numbers in the fourth episode. Several Monoids were portrayed by extras, which prevented Imison from giving them specific directions. Dodo's costume in the final scene was the first appearance of a miniskirt on British television.

=== Casting and characters ===
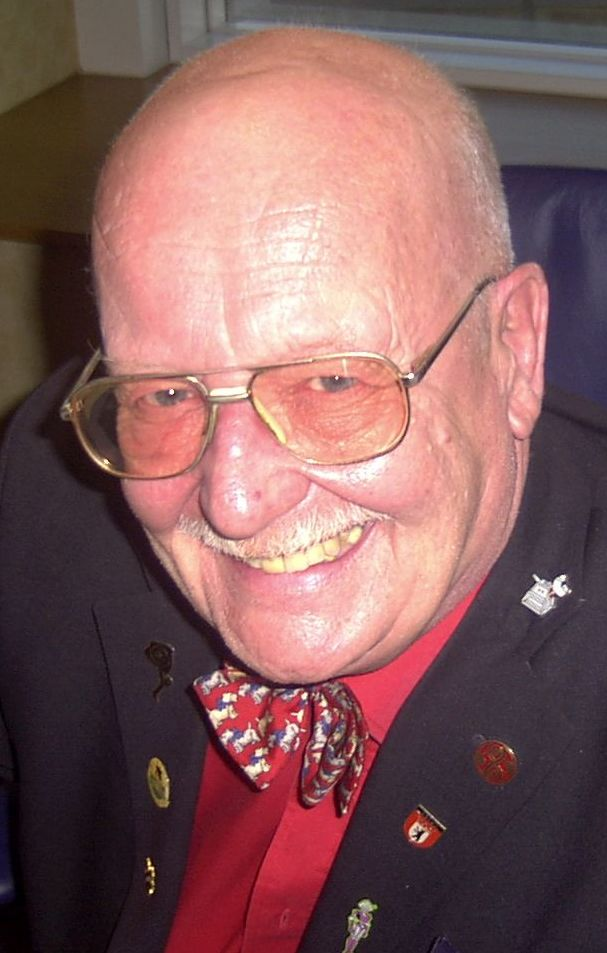
Michael Sheard (pictured in 2003) portrayed Rhos in The Ark; he returned to the series in different roles alongside five Doctors. (Note: Michael Sheard later returned in The Highlanders (1966–1967), Pyramids of Mars (1975), The Invisible Enemy (1977), Castrovalva (1982), and Remembrance of the Daleks (1988).)

The Ark is Dodo's first full story as a companion, following her introduction in The Massacre. Actress Jackie Lane had worked with Imison on the television series Compact, and they worked together to develop Dodo's role. Dodo's accent had changed from The Massacre; Lane struggled speaking with a northern accent, and concerns were raised about a character not speaking good "BBC English". Lane considered Hartnell welcoming and friendly, though occasionally irritable; he found the persistent cast and crew changes difficult. Imison sensed the tension between Hartnell and Wiles. Michael Sheard was cast as Rhos; he later returned to the series in different roles on five occasions, each alongside a different actor as the Doctor. During rehearsals, Sheard offended Hartnell by calling him "Billy"; the former had intended it with admiration, but the latter took it as a slight.

Brian Wright was cast as Dassuk; he was Imison's friend from Oxford University, and they had worked together on Compact and a BBC2 adaptation of Liza of Lambeth. Richard Beale's deep voice as the Refusian was used to suggest its size and power; (Note: Lloyd later sent a letter congratulating Beale on his work in both The Ark and The Gunfighters.) he had also worked with Imison on Compact, as had Terence Bayler, who portrayed Yendom. Bayler cut his hand while fighting a Monoid in the third episode. Eileen Helsby, the sister of Imison's assistant Thelma Helsby, played Venussa. The Monoids' dialogue was performed by voice actors in the studio—including Roy Skelton, who later had a long history with Doctor Who as the voice of the Cybermen and Daleks—and processed by the BBC Radiophonic Workshop's Brian Hodgson. Imison cast Terence Woodfield as Maharis at Wiles's recommendation, following his role in The Daleks' Master Plan; Maharis's death scene was among his earliest work on The Ark.

=== Filming ===
The first production work on The Ark, on 24 January 1966, was photography at Ealing Studios of extra David Greneau, who portrayed the miniaturised prisoner in the first episode. Early 35 mm filming took place at Ealing from 31 January to 3 February; a fifth day of filming likely took place on 4 February. Several animals were used for filming in the studio, including a baby Indian elephant named Monica, trained by Mary Chipperfield; Monica had been touring the country with a travelling circus, and was kept in a van outside Imison's home the night before filming as the BBC did not allow the driver to park at the studio. Monica's appearance was Imison's proudest achievement on The Ark; he filmed her alongside the regular cast to demonstrate that stock footage had not been used. She was shy and had to be coached towards the actors during filming. Hartnell and Monica got along well, likely due to the peanuts he kept in his pocket. She was extensively in the serial's promotion, with several photographs taken. The vehicles used on the Ark were electric trolleys used by the BBC to transport timber.

Rehearsals for the serial started on 14 February. During rehearsals, Davis began an effective working relationship with Hartnell, discovering that he could not be confronted directly but persuaded by reminiscing. Weekly recording began on 18 February in Studio 1 of Riverside Studios; the jungle set was transferred from Ealing. The first episode was scheduled to overrun by 15 minutes. While filming the second episode, Wiles felt Dodo had not been convincingly upset by the Monoid's death; Lane rebutted by admitting difficulty expressing concern about "a heap of wrinkled rubber". Some overhead shots were achieved using mirrors. Filming of the second and third episodes overran by 15 minutes, incurring additional costs. The final episode was recorded on 11 March. Shortly before filming, Imison was told that his BBC contract was not being renewed, which he attributed to overrunning in recording The Ark; it was his final television directing work. The episode was Doctor Who's first to be recorded out of sequence, starting with the closing scene, and correctly assembled during editing. The first episode was budgeted at £2,700 but cost more than double, while the rest were budgeted at £2,400 each but cost less; recording cost a total of £11,159 (Note: The four episodes cost £5,678, £1,945, £1,939, £1,597, respectively.) (equivalent to £182,000 in 2025).

== Reception ==
=== Broadcast and ratings ===
Episode	Title	Run time	Original release date	UK viewers (millions)	Appreciation Index
1	"The Steel Sky"	24:00	5 March 1966	5.5	55
2	"The Plague"	25:00	12 March 1966	6.9	56
3	"The Return"	24:19	19 March 1966	6.2	51
4	"The Bomb"	24:37	26 March 1966	7.3	50

The Ark was broadcast on BBC1 in four weekly parts from 5 to 26 March 1966. Viewership was low, continuing the declining ratings from The Massacre; all four episodes were below the season's 7.65 million average. The first episode marked the first time since the first episode in 1963 that Doctor Who failed to chart in the week's top 100 programmes. Its low viewership was partly attributed to the success of Thank Your Lucky Stars, a competing programme on ITV. Viewership increased, up to 6.9 million for the second episode and 7.3 million for the fourth (an estimated four million households), which was among the month's top five children's programmes and the programme's highest viewership in the preceding two months. The Appreciation Index scores were "reasonable", ranging from 50 to 55.

The serial was sold extensively overseas from the mid-1960s; (Note: It was broadcast in Australia in December 1966, Barbados in February 1968, Zambia in May 1968, New Zealand from March 1969, Sierra Leone in January 1971, Singapore in January 1973, the United States in 1985 (as a 93-minute compilation), and Canada in the early 1990s.) some cuts were required for the Australian and New Zealand broadcasts, particularly death screams and close-up shots of Monoids. BBC Enterprises stopped offering it for sale by 1974, and Australia's ABC returned the film prints in June 1975. The 405-line videotapes of all four episodes were cleared for wiping on 17 August 1967 and subsequently erased; the BBC Film and Television Archives acquired a 16 mm film recording of the third episode around 1976–1977. In 1978, BBC Enterprises discovered it possessed all four episodes on 16 mm film; The Ark is the first third-season serial to still exist in its entirety. The fourth episode was shown as one of the First Doctor's "selected gems" at the National Film Theatre's Doctor Who: The Developing Art event on 29 October 1983, and it was broadcast in episodic and compilation formats on UK Gold from December 1992.

=== Critical response ===
The Monoids received mixed responses from critics, who appreciated the ambition but criticised the designs.

After the fourth episode, Television Today's Bill Norris praised the story's "imagination", Helsby's performance, and Dare's costumes, noting he had "grown quite attached" to the Monoids, though he felt the "jerky" narrative required concentration to follow and considered it disingenuous to end with the Doctor's sermon on the story's morals. The Listener's J. C. Trewin enjoyed the episode's comedy, citing its ending; he wrote that the Monoids "talked like Daleks and looked like a cross between an ape and a Cyclops". In retrospective reviews, critics praised Imison's direction and Newbery's designs; Doctor Who Magazine's (DWM) Dave Owen called the first episode "a stylistic coup", lauding Imison's direction through images instead of dialogue, and Mark Clapham, Eddie Robson, and Jim Smith applauded his use of camera angles and movement. Total Sci-Fi Online's Brian J. Robb called the special effects work "some of the best ... seen on the show" to date, praising the matte and forced perspective shots. DWM readers consistently ranked The Ark among the lower half of the First Doctor's stories. (Note: Of the First Doctor's 29 stories, The Ark was voted 18th in 1998 and 2009, 19th in 2014, and 20th in 2023.)

DVD Talk's John Sinnott felt the Monoids "look sufficiently alien in nature" but lacked enough menace to match the Daleks' popularity. Some writers compared the Monoids to the modern Ood, (Note: In Simon Guerrier's novel The Pirate Loop (2007), the Tenth Doctor compares the Monoids to the Ood.) and several reviewers criticised their design, comparing their hairstyles to those of the Beatles; DWM's Gary Gillatt appreciated the ambition but felt "there's too much going on", and Total Sci-Fi Online's Robb found they undermined the otherwise ambitious story. SFX's Ian Berriman called the Monoids "laughable" and lacking in characterisation but otherwise enjoyed the "quaint" serial's ambition, fast pace, and epic sets. David J. Howe and Stephen James Walker liked the design but considered the characters "somewhat one-dimensional and faceless" due to the limited time for characterisation, with the Monoids becoming "cliched monsters" after their civil war; they felt the Monoids' success being attributed to the cold virus "dilutes the moral questions that the story implicitly poses" about their treatment by humans in the first two episodes. Radio Times's Patrick Mulkern similarly felt the serial lacked time to develop the Guardians or introduce a "dramatic incident".

The second episode's cliffhanger received praise; io9's Charlie Jane Anders ranked it among the programme's best, calling it "a really neat visual trick that tells you everything you need to know". Several reviewers enjoyed the use of time travel to revisit the same location and highlight the consequences of the protagonists' actions. DVD Talk's Sinnott considered the first two episodes "slow", with too much time dedicated to the trial and discussions, but found the story more interesting after the second episode, particularly Steven leading the humans' revolt and the Doctor investigating Refusis II. Conversely, DWM's Vanessa Bishop found the second half slower, citing the "dull sub-plot" of the Monoids' civil war. Gillatt criticised Erickson's scripts, calling the last episode "gentle nonsense", and Clapham, Robson, and Smith noted their "clumsy exposition", convenient solutions, and the trial's inconsequentiality. Dave Owen disliked the "universally dreadful performances" and the story's unfulfilled ambitious promise, and Valerie Estelle Frankel denounced the Doctor and Steven's patronising attitude towards Dodo, who is treated as a child.

Paul Cornell, Martin Day, and Keith Topping of The Discontinuity Guide (1995) called the serial "a clever and tightly constructed tale" and felt its two-episode introduction was unique to the early era of Doctor Who. John Kenneth Muir lauded the "new twist" of the story's two different eras, demonstrating the results of the characters' interference, and IGN's Arnold T. Blumberg applauded the "snappy and exciting" pace and "surprisingly top-notch" production values. Reflecting on the serial's apocalyptic themes, Andrew Crome linked the complexities of human–Monoid integration with contemporary debates around the Race Relations Act 1965, and noted that, while the Doctor accepts the Monoids' servitude without challenge, he is keen to encourage revolt to free the humans. Crome also compared The Ark to the 1975 serial The Ark in Space, remarking that the latter's references to Noah are more pronounced. Mark Brake compared the narrative to the Spanish flu pandemic in its deadly depiction of a real plague.

== Commercial releases ==
The Ark
- Author: Paul Erickson
- Cover artist: David McAllister
- Series: Doctor Who book: Target novelisations
- Release number: 114
- Publisher: Target Books
- Publication date: 16 October 1986
- ISBN: 0-426-20253-8

Erickson expanded several concepts from the original story in his novelisation of The Ark, published in hardback by W. H. Allen on 16 October 1986 and paperback by Target Books on 19 March 1987, with a cover by David McAllister. Target published a new edition, with a cover by Alister Pearson, was published on 3 December 1992. An unabridged reading of the book was published by BBC Audiobooks on 1 March 2018, with narration by Purves.

The Ark was released on VHS by BBC Video on 5 October 1998, and on DVD by 2 Entertain on 14 February 2011, featuring documentaries about the Monoids, Riverside Studios, and H. G. Wells's influence on Doctor Who, and an audio commentary with Purves, Imison, and Toby Hadoke. Most of the serial's major contributors were no longer alive; Lane was interested in appearing in but was unexpectedly unavailable, while Newbery could not appear due to family illness. Critics praised the DVD's restoration and special features, though SFX's Berriman called the documentaries "a little unfocussed". The Ark was added to BBC iPlayer on 1 November 2023 alongside most other serials.

The serial's audio was the second existing story to be released on CD by BBC Audio in August 2006, with narration by (and an interview with) Purves; it was included, alongside digital copies of the original scripts, in The Lost TV Episodes: Collection 6 by AudioGO in September 2013. Audio commentaries of The Ark and The Rescue with Maureen O'Brien and Roy Spencer were released on CD by Fantom Films in October 2017. Monoid figurines were released by Harlequin Miniatures in March 1998 (alongside Steven and Dodo) and May 2000, and in Eaglemoss's Doctor Who Figurine Collection in November 2016. A Monoid puppet appears in the 2013 episode "The Time of the Doctor".

== Bibliography ==
- Brake, Mark (2021). The Science of Doctor Who. Skyhorse Publishing. ISBN 978-1-510-75787-5.
- Brunt, David (10 May 2024). The Doctor Who Production Diary: The Hartnell Years. Telos Publishing. ISBN 978-1-845-83222-3.
- Campbell, Mark (2010). Doctor Who: The Episode Guide. Pocket Essentials. ISBN 978-1-84243-660-8.
- Clapham, Mark; Robson, Eddie; Smith, Jim (2005). Who's Next: An Unofficial Guide to Doctor Who. Virgin Books. ISBN 978-0-753-50948-7.
- Cornell, Paul; Day, Martin; Topping, Keith (1995). The Discontinuity Guide. London: Virgin Books. ISBN 0-426-20442-5.
- Crome, Andrew (2013). "'Ready to outsit eternity': Human Responses to the Apocalypse". In Leitch, Gillian I. (ed.). Doctor Who in Time and Space: Essays on Themes, Characters, History and Fandom, 1963–2012. McFarland & Company. pp. 175–194. ISBN 978-0-786-46549-1.
- Frankel, Valerie Estelle (2018). Women in Doctor Who: Damsels, Feminists and Monsters. Jefferson: McFarland & Company. ISBN 978-1-493-00016-6.
- Howe, David J.; Walker, Stephen James (1998). Doctor Who: The Television Companion (2003 ed.). London: BBC Books. ISBN 978-0-563-40588-7.
- Howe, David J.; Stammers, Mark; Walker, Stephen James (1994). Doctor Who: The Handbook – The First Doctor. Vol. 1 (1995 ed.). London: Telos Publishing. ISBN 978-1-845-83941-3.
- Muir, John Kenneth (1999). A Critical History of Doctor Who on Television. Jefferson, North Carolina: McFarland & Company. ISBN 978-0-786-40442-1.
- Rigelsford, Adrian (1994). The Doctors: 30 Years of Time Travel. Boxtree Limited. ISBN 978-0-752-20959-3.
- Smith, Paul MC (July 2021). Based on the Popular BBC Television Serial (4th ed.). Wonderful Books. Archived from the original on 19 August 2022.
- Wright, Mark, ed. (13 June 2018). "The Massacre of St Bartholomew's Eve, The Ark, The Celestial Toymaker and The Gunfighters". Doctor Who: The Complete History. 7 (73). London: Panini Comics, Hachette Partworks: 38–65. ISSN 2057-6048.

=== DVD resources ===
- Guerrier, Thomas (director) (2011). One Hit Wonder (DVD documentary). 2 Entertain.
- Purves, Peter; Imison, Michael; Hadoke, Toby (2011). The Ark (DVD commentary). 2 Entertain.
- Smith, Jim (compiler) (2011). The Ark (Production Subtitles). 2 Entertain.
