= Roy Spencer (actor) =

British actor and special effects technician (died c. 2026)

- Born: Heanor, Derbyshire, England
- Died: c. 2026
- Occupations: Actor and special effects technician
- Years active: 1956–2009

Roy Spencer (died c. 2026) was a British actor and special effects technician.

== Life and career ==
Spencer was born in Heanor, Derbyshire, but grew up in Eastwood, Nottinghamshire. Trained at the Royal Academy of Dramatic Art which he graduated from in 1956, he became a member of the Royal Shakespeare Company for two seasons, during which he went with them on a Russian tour.

He appeared in several films and television shows, including two roles in Doctor Who, as Manyak in The Ark and as Frank Harris in Fury from the Deep.

Spencer also wrote several books about the author D. H. Lawrence and appeared in the BBC dramatisation of Lawrence's The Rainbow (1988).

Spencer's death was announced in the Autumn/Winter 2026 edition of Equity magazine.

== Partial filmography ==
Year	Title	Role	Notes
1960	Saturday Night and Sunday Morning	Onlooker	Uncredited
1965	Help!	Technician	Uncredited
1966	Doctor Who	Manyak	Serial: The Ark
1968	Doctor Who	Frank Harris	Serial: Fury from the Deep
1975	Barry Lyndon	Horse Seller	
1979	A Question of Faith	Ivan Yegorovich	
