= Eileen Helsby =

British actress

- Born: 30 June 1937 (age 88); Blackpool, Lancashire, England
- Occupation: Actress
- Years active: 1960—1991
- Known for: The Ark; The Newcomers

Eileen Helsby (born 30 June 1937) is a British actress with several television credits.

She appeared in the Doctor Who serial The Ark, Z-Cars, Doomwatch, Looking for Clancy, Survivors, Angels, Juliet Bravo, Bergerac and Strangers and Brothers.
