= Richard Imison =

- Born: 31 October 1936; Birkenhead
- Died: 9 February 1993 (aged 56); London
- Occupations: Script Editor, BBC Radio Drama 1963-91
- Relatives: Michael Imison (brother)

Richard Imison (31 October 1936 – 9 February 1993) was Script Editor for BBC Radio Drama from 1963 to 1991.

== Career ==
In the 30 years that Imison worked for BBC Radio Drama it was the largest patron of original creative dramatic writing in Britain. In his role as Script Editor no other single individual had as much influence in either the discovery of new talent or the encouragement of established writers. These included Edward Albee, Ludmilla Petrushevskaya, Alexander Gelman, Harold Pinter and Samuel Beckett in the production of drama for radio.

Imison was key in setting up the Giles Cooper Awards in 1977, together with Geoffrey Strachan of the publishers Methuen. These lasted until the year after his death and were the premier celebration of dramatic writing for radio. They were named after the radio dramatist Giles Cooper whose work first appeared on BBC radio in 1949.

== Legacy ==
After his death in 1993 the Society of Authors established the Richard Imison Award in recognition of Imison's enduring influence on the development of high quality dramatic writing.
