= Mark Brake =

Welsh academic and science communicator (born 1958)

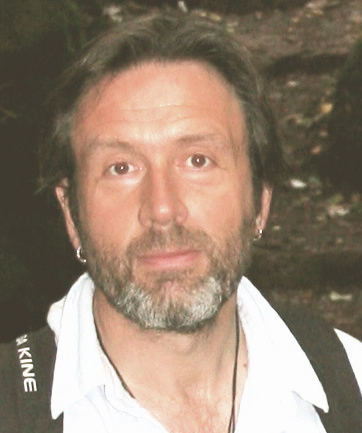
- Born: 31 October 1958 (age 67)
- Education: Cardiff University (MSc)
- Scientific career
- Fields: Science Communication
- Workplaces: University of Glamorgan
- Website: markbrake.org

Mark Brake (born 31 October 1958) is a Welsh academic, author, and former professor of science communication at the University of Glamorgan.

== Biography ==
Brake earned a Masters of Science degree from University College Cardiff in 1988.

In 1998, Brake developed an undergraduate course, examining the science and culture of astrobiology, entitled “Life in the Universe” at University of Glamorgan. The following year, he established the Science and Science Fiction degree programme at the University of Glamorgan, allowing undergraduate students to investigate the cultural significance of science fiction. In 2000, while heading the Department of Earth and Space Sciences at University of Glamorgan, he was part of an initiative that exposed 50 young students to the study of astronomy and space science. In 2002, he was appointed as a professor of science communication by University of Glamorgan. He also directed the South Wales institute’s Science Communication Research Unit, attracting £5 million in funding for various public engagement initiatives between 2003 and 2008.

In 2005, University of Glamorgan introduced a three-year degree in astrobiology, for which Brake was the course leader.

In 2008, a team of University of Glamorgan astronomers and science communicators, comprising Brake, Allan Trow, Martin Griffiths and Catherine Tryfona, was awarded a prize for public engagement by the Astrobiology Society of Britain for their work on the Robotic Cyberspace Community Telescope Observatory (RoCCoTO) project. The project was a community-based initiative that offered online and traditional learning materials and resources on astrobiology for the local community. In 2001, as part of the project, Brake led the installation of the only public-access deep-space telescope in the UK atop the tallest building on the University of Glamorgan’s Pontypridd campus. The project received £1.5 million in funding from European Social Fund (ESF) and University of Glamorgan.

Brake was one of the founding members of NASA’s Astrobiology Institute’s science communication group. He cofounded the Centre for Astronomy and Science Education with Paul Roche. In 2023, Roche resigned in protest over Brake’s management of the centre, moving the Faulkes Telescope Project to Cardiff University along with his team of three staff members. Brake filed a formal grievance for alleged harassment against the academic who replaced Roche. During the disciplinary hearings, resulting in the academic’s dismissal in 2007, it was revealed that Brake misrepresented his qualifications in a 2006 grant application submitted to the Research Councils' Procurement Organisation (RCPO). In the application, Brake wrongly stated that he earned a PhD from Cardiff University. After an internal investigation, University of Glamorgan described the matter as “an isolated incident” and revised its grant-application vetting processes.

Brake left University of Glamorgan in 2010. He cowrote and cohosted two educational shows—“Science of Doctor Who” and “Science of Star Wars”—with rapper Jon Chase between 2012 and 2014, touring science and literary festivals across Edinburgh, Hay, and Cambridge.

Brake has argued that Charles Darwin's theory of evolution, as expressed in his 1859 Origin of Species, was influenced by the work of Alfred Russel Wallace. This view has been contested.

== Publications ==
- Different Engines: How Science Drives Fiction and Fiction Drives Science (2007) ISBN 0-230-01980-3
- Futureworld: Where Science Fiction Becomes Science (2008) ISBN 0-7522-2672-X
- Revolution in Science: How Galileo and Darwin Changed Our World (2009) ISBN 0-230-20268-3
- Introducing Science Communication: A Practical Guide (2009) ISBN 0-230-57385-1
- Space Hoppers (2010) ISBN 0-230-74833-3
- Really Really Big Questions About Space and Time (2010) ISBN 0-7534-6747-X
- The Alien Hunter's Handbook: How to Look for Extraterrestrial Life (2012) ISBN 0-7534-6885-9
- Alien Life Imagined: Communicating the Science and Culture of Astrobiology (2012) ISBN 0-521-60645-4
- Mark Brake's Space, Time, Machine, Monster (2014) ISBN 0-9928607-7-6
- How to be a Space Explorer: Your Out-of-this-World Adventure (2014) ISBN 1-74360-434-3
- Mark Brake’s Space, Time, Machine, Monster: Dr Who Edition (2015) ISBN 0-993-32213-1
- The Science of Star Wars (2016) ISBN 1-944-68628-2
- The Big Earth Book (2017) ISBN 1-787-01277-8
- The Science of Harry Potter (2017) ISBN 1-631-58237-2
- The Science of Superheroes (2018) ISBN 1-631-58211-9
- The Science of Science Fiction (2018) ISBN 9781510739369
- The Science of The Big Bang Theory (2019) ISBN 1-510-74149-6
- The Science of James Bond (2020) ISBN 1-510-743-790
- The Science of Doctor Who (2021) ISBN 1510757864
- The Science of Jurassic World (2021) ISBN 9781510762589
- The Science of Star Trek (2022) ISBN 1510757880
- The Science of Aliens (2022) ISBN 9781510767102
- The Science of Sherlock (2023) ISBN 9781510770584
- The Science of The Mandalorian (2023) ISBN 9781510770591
- The Science of Superwomen (2024) ISBN 9781510776319
