= John Imison =

English mechanic and printer

John Imison (died 16 August 1788), was an English mechanic and printer. Imison operated in Manchester during the years 1783–85 as a clock and watchmaker, optician, and printer.

Henry Lemoine stated that "among other pursuits he made some progress in the art of letter-founding, and actually printed several small popular novels at Manchester, with woodcuts cut by himself." He printed Drill Husbandry Perfected, by the Rev. James Cooke (c. 1783), The History of the Lives, Acts, and Martyrdoms of … Blessed Christians, with cuts (1785), and a pamphlet on The Construction and Use of the Barometer or Weather Glass. His best work was considered to have been The School of Arts, or an Introduction to Useful Knowledge, 1785. A portion of this was separately issued as A Treatise on the 'Mechanical Powers' London, 1787. Second editions of both came out in 1794, and there were subsequent issues of the School of Arts in 1803, entitled Elements of Science and Art, and later in 1807 and 1822.

Imison died in London on 16 August 1788.

== Notes ==
Attribution

This article incorporates text from a publication now in the public domain: "Imison, John". Dictionary of National Biography. London: Smith, Elder & Co. 1885–1900.
