= New Earth (Doctor Who) =

168 – "New Earth"
- Doctor Who episode

Cast
- Doctor: David Tennant – Tenth Doctor
- Companion: Billie Piper – Rose Tyler
- Others: Camille Coduri – Jackie Tyler; Noel Clarke – Mickey Smith; Zoë Wanamaker – Cassandra; Sean Gallagher – Chip; Doña Croll – Matron Casp; Michael Fitzgerald – Duke of Manhattan; Lucy Robinson – Frau Clovis; Adjoa Andoh – Sister Jatt; Anna Hope – Novice Hame; Simon Ludders – Patient; Struan Rodger – Face of Boe

Production
- Directed by: James Hawes
- Written by: Russell T Davies
- Produced by: Phil Collinson
- Executive producers: Russell T Davies; Julie Gardner
- Music by: Murray Gold
- Production code: 2.1
- Series: Series 2
- Running time: 45 minutes
- First broadcast: 15 April 2006

Chronology
← Preceded by "The Christmas Invasion"	Followed by → "Tooth and Claw"

"New Earth" is the first episode of the second series of the British science fiction television series Doctor Who. It was first broadcast on BBC One on 15 April 2006.

The episode is set five billion years in the future on New Earth, a planet humanity settled on following the destruction of the Earth in the 2005 episode "The End of the World". In the episode, the alien time traveller the Tenth Doctor (David Tennant), his travelling companion Rose Tyler (Billie Piper), and their old enemy Lady Cassandra (Zoë Wanamaker) uncover many artificially-grown humans having been infected with every disease in a luxury hospital by the Sisters of Plenitude as a way of finding cures for the diseases. The Face of Boe makes his second appearance before his last appearance in "Gridlock", the third and final sequel episode to the "New Earth Trilogy".

== Plot ==
=== Synopsis ===
The Tenth Doctor takes Rose to the year 5,000,000,023 to a world humanity settled on after the destruction of the Earth (Note: The natural destruction of the Earth caused by the sun expanding is depicted in the 2005 episode "The End of the World".) called "New Earth", in the galaxy M87. The Face of Boe telepathically summons the Doctor to a hospital ward in New New York. In the ward, the Doctor notices humanoid feline nuns of the Sisters of Plenitude have been curing incurable diseases. Meanwhile, Rose is separated from the Doctor and is tricked by Lady Cassandra into having Cassandra's mind implanted in Rose's body.

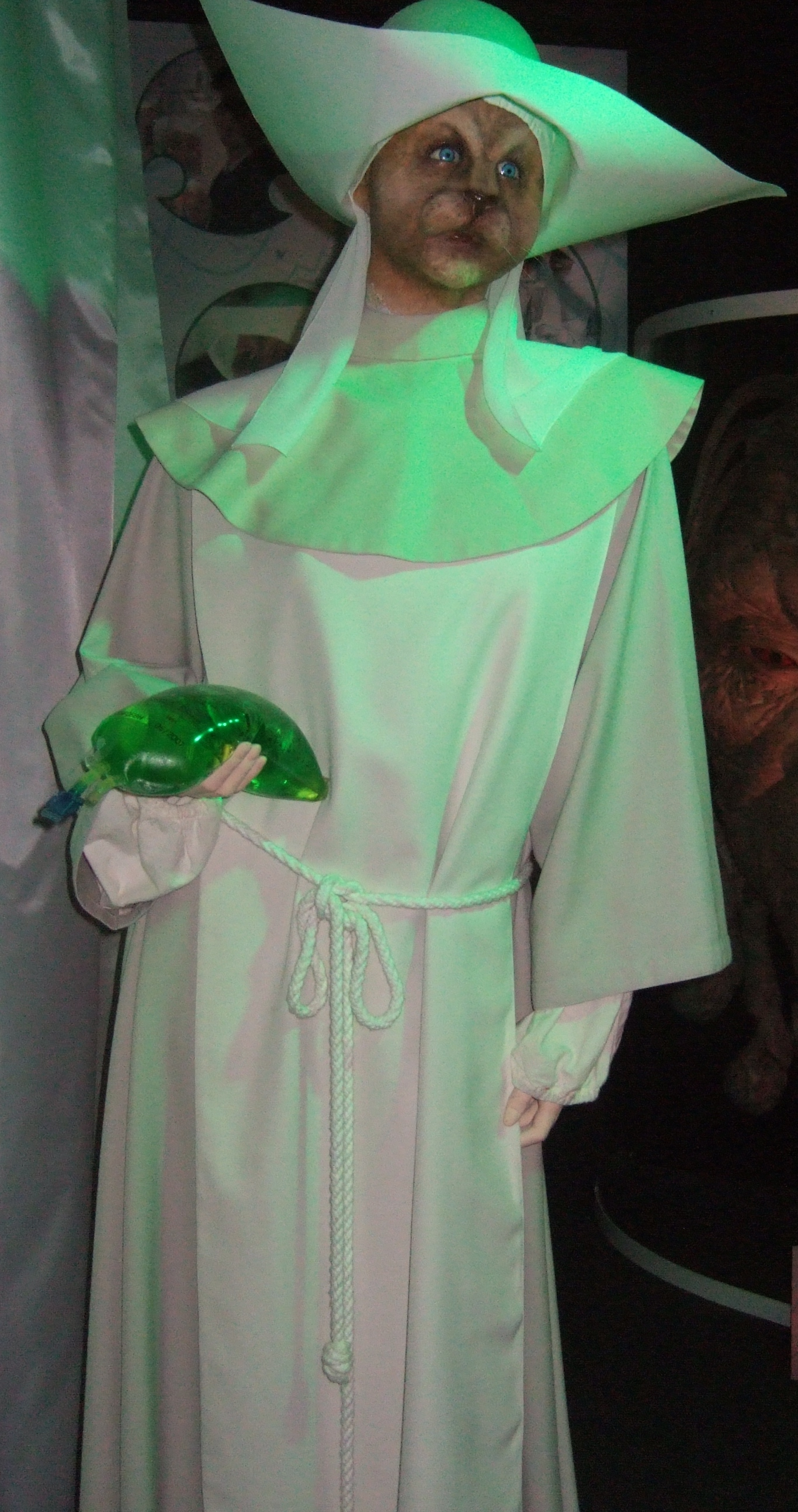
The Sisters of Plenitude as shown at the Doctor Who Experience

The Doctor and Cassandra discover that the hospital houses thousands of pods containing artificially grown humans in what is supposedly the intensive care unit. The artificial humans are forcibly infected with every disease in the galaxy so that the Sisters can discover the cures as a way of dealing with the influx of settlers and the diseases they brought with them. Cassandra reveals she is in Rose's body and knocks the Doctor out with a perfume gas, locking him in a pod. Cassandra then approaches Sister Jatt and demands payment in exchange for keeping the human test subjects secret. The Sisters refuse, and Cassandra releases the Doctor and some of the humans as a distraction. The infected humans release others from their pods and soon a zombie-like attack begins, with those infected trying to attack others in the hospital.

The Doctor and Cassandra reach the Face of Boe's ward and grab all the intravenous medical solutions, emptying them into a disinfectant shower installed in a lift. They apply the mixture to a group of infected humans, who within moments become cured of their diseases. The Doctor encourages them to go and spread the cure to the other infected people, and soon the attack is over. The police arrest the surviving Sisters, while the Face of Boe tells the Doctor that the message for him can wait until they meet for the third and final time.

The Doctor orders Cassandra out of Rose's body. Cassandra's servant Chip volunteers to accept her consciousness. Chip's cloned body begins to fail, and Cassandra finally accepts her death. The Doctor takes Cassandra back to see herself on the last night someone had called her beautiful. Cassandra, in Chip's body, approaches her younger self at a party and tells her that she is beautiful, before collapsing and dying in her arms.

=== Outside references ===
Cassandra uses the UK slang term "chav", although she is unable to mimic Rose's accent properly, instead making attempts at Cockney rhyming slang. Rose refers to Chip as "Gollum".

== Production ==
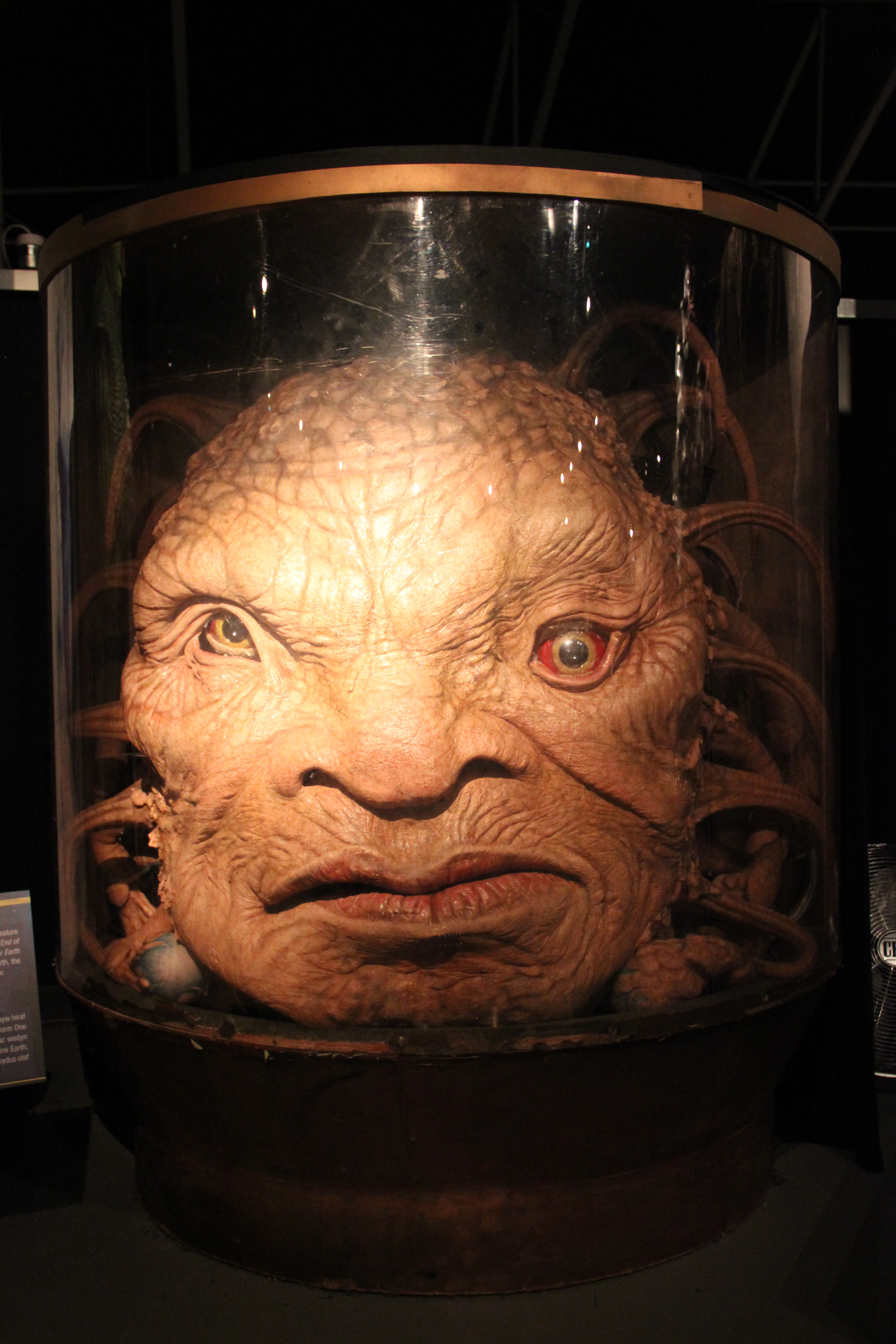
The Face of Boe last appeared in The End of the World. His role was elevated from his previously incidental role.

Russell T Davies said of the episode "I promised Billie [Piper] an episode in which she'd be funny. So episode one of the new series is very much based around comedy for Billie."

The exterior scenes on New Earth were shot at Rhossili Bay overlooking Worm's Head on the Gower Peninsula on 26 September 2005. The hospital basement scenes were recorded at Tredegar House in Newport. The location for the pods containing the human specimens was a disused paper mill previously used as the base of the Nestene Consciousness in "Rose". The hospital scenes were filmed inside the Wales Millennium Centre. The nightclub the Doctor and Rose take Cassandra (as Chip) to at the end was filmed at the restaurant Ba Orient in Cardiff Bay. As it was filmed during the day, the building was covered with black drapes. The exterior shots of the lift car as Rose descends to the basement are reused footage from "Rose". Cassandra's face and body was put in during post-production by The Mill.

The producer's and director's credits have been amended slightly since "The Christmas Invasion", so that now the credit is in lower case and the name of the crew-member is in capitals. This was the result of a suggestion from a Doctor Who Magazine editor, who felt the previous arrangement had made the job seem more important than the crewmember.

This episode is set twenty-three years after the events of the 2005 episode "The End of the World", and thirty years prior to the events of the 2007 episode "Gridlock". According to Russell T Davies on the episode commentary, Cassandra's earlier self bases Chip on the man who had praised her beauty at the party — Chip himself. Where the "pattern" for Chip comes from in the first instance is thus unclear, creating an ontological paradox.

Also in the commentary, Tennant noted that the TARDIS has moved since "The Christmas Invasion". He speculates that there might have been many off-screen adventures, or (observing that it no longer seems like Christmas in the introduction) perhaps that the Doctor "lived there for a bit".

=== Cast notes ===
Adjoa Andoh returned to Doctor Who in five episodes of Series 3 and the final two episodes of Series 4, as Francine Jones, mother of Martha Jones. She also played Nurse Albertine in the audio play Year of the Pig.

== Broadcast and reception ==
Overnight ratings for the episode peaked at 8.3 million viewers in the UK, with a final rating of 8.62 million, making it the ninth most watched programme of the week. The episode achieved an audience Appreciation Index of 85. This is the first Doctor Who episode to have an accompanying TARDISODE.

The Canadian English-language premiere of Series 2 on CBC, consisting of this episode, took place on 9 October 2006. It concluded with an extended version of the "Tooth and Claw" trailer from the BBC broadcast; the revised closing theme was not heard in the broadcast and it was also the first episode to be broadcast without a specially taped introduction featuring one of the lead actors. The episode had previously aired on 29 August 2006 in translation on the French-language broadcaster Ztélé, under the title Une nouvelle Terre.

This episode was released together with "The Christmas Invasion" as a basic DVD with no special features on 1 May 2006, and as part of a second series boxset on 20 November 2006. *Copies of the DVD from the complete Series 2 set distributed to Netflix customers contained an error: at the 32-minute mark, the playback switched abruptly to a gruesome scene from The Texas Chainsaw Massacre: The Beginning. Netflix has pulled the disc from their inventory while they work out the issue with the BBC; this only seems to have affected Netflix copies.

IGN rated the episode 7.2 out of 10, concluding, "Although this was an entertaining episode, it did not have the dramatic impact of the previous episode. Overall, 'New Earth' featured more than a few interesting moments, such as the scenes with the Doctor and the Face of Boe, and Billie Piper's performance as the Casandra-possessed Rose was hilarious; but the zombie attack felt quite out of place for a Doctor Who episode". Nick Setchfield of SFX questioned whether the "brash, colourful and occasionally howl-out-loud funny" tone was appropriate enough to start the series, but he praised the concept of the cat nuns as well as their prosthetics, Tennant's performance, and the ending that "alchemises the broad strokes comedy into something genuinely moving". Writing for The A.V. Club in 2014, Alasdair Wilkins gave "New Earth" the grade of "C+". He noted that, likely due to production difficulties, it "too often feels like it is missing vital context" and suffered from unconvincing special effects. Furthermore, he criticised the story for being "caught between two irreconcilable tones" and featuring a "baffling" ending that wished to redeem Cassandra. Nevertheless, he found Tennant's performance to be impressive though not as coherent as he eventually will be, and he praised Piper despite the fact that the story lacked Rose's character.
