= Tamsyn Imison =

- Born: Tamsyn Love Trenaman; 1 May 1937; St Pancras, London, England
- Died: 18 September 2017 (aged 80); Halesworth, Suffolk, England
- Education: Somerville College, Oxford
- Occupation: Educator
- Spouse: Michael Imison (m. 1958)
- Children: 3

Dame Tamsyn Love Imison, DBE (née Trenaman ; 1 May 1937 – 18 September 2017) was a prominent British educator and "educational strategist" whose first career was as a scientific illustrator.

Imison was educated at Somerville College, Oxford. After having a family of three, she went into teaching science in 1972 and taught for nearly 30 years. Between 1984 and 2000, she was head teacher of the Hampstead School in north London. Imison wrote, researched and lectured on numerous topics related to academia, including Leadership, ICT, Comprehensive Schooling, Creativity, Learning, Schools of the Future, Post 16 and Women Leaders. She chaired various committees and was made an Honorary Fellow of Somerville College, Oxford, Queen Mary University of London and the Institute of Education, University of London.

She retired in 2005 to Halesworth, Suffolk. There she devoted a large part of her time improving the natural environment in the town. She helped found and run 'Halesworth in Bloom', achieving her goal of becoming best small town in 2015. She also helped the park gain green flag status and created a new Hooker Trail within to celebrate the famous botanist Sir Joseph Dalton Hooker who once lived in Halesworth. In June 2017, she organised a weekend-long celebration of his bicentenary. Three months later, she died of cancer at the age of 80.
