= Michael Imison =

British TV director and literary agent (born 1935)

- Born: Michael Halton Imison; 9 February 1935 (age 91); Hoylake, Cheshire
- Education: Exeter College, Oxford
- Occupations: Television director, literary agent
- Spouse: Tamsyn Imison (née Trenaman) (m. 1958; died 2017)
- Children: 3
- Relatives: Richard Imison (brother)

Michael Imison (born in Hoylake, Cheshire, 9 February 1935) is a retired British television director and literary agent. He directed several productions for the BBC in the 1960s, including Doctor Who, and subsequently served as the story editor on the second series of the science-fiction anthology programme Out of the Unknown.

== Early life and education ==
Imison attended Exeter College at the University of Oxford. During the 1950s, he served as a cadet in the national service.

== BBC career ==
Imison began his career at the BBC working for the Script Department. Initial successes included directing Magnyfcence by John Skelton at the Tower Theatre, Canonbury in May 1963. Under contract as a director at the BBC, Imison directed Compact and a serial adaptation of Thomas Mann's Buddenbrooks.

His final directorial assignment for the BBC was the Doctor Who serial The Ark (1966), which starred William Hartnell as the First Doctor. Although his contract as a staff director was not renewed following the completion of the serial, Imison remained at the BBC and acted as story editor on the second series of Out of the Unknown under producer Irene Shubik.

== Literary agent ==
Later in his career, Imison became a literary agent. His company represented Noël Coward and Terence Rattigan, among many other playwrights. He also helped previously unknown dramatists such as David Edgar (The Life and Adventures of Nicholas Nickleby) and Bernard Pomerance (The Elephant Man) to international success. It has now been incorporated into Alan Brodie Representation Ltd.

From 1976 until 1982, Imision represented playwright Mary O'Malley. In July 1978, the pair were involved in a car crash, hitting a lamppost. O'Malley, in the passenger seat, received a devastating injury to her right arm, resulting in an ununited fracture that took four years to unite, affecting her writing career for two years. Seven years after the accident, she sued her former agent for damages and was awarded £55,000 in costs. Imison admitted liability but contested the amount of damages.

== Other work ==
Imison founded and chaired the Noël Coward Society, worked for the British Humanist Association, and also founded and chaired the Edinburgh Festival Fringe Society when he was the undergraduate director of the Oxford University Theatre Group, known for its late-night revues which launched the careers of Alan Bennett and Dudley Moore among others.

== Personal life ==
Imison was married to the educator Dame Tamsyn Imison and lives in Suffolk.
