= Doctor Who Magazine =

British magazine

- Doctor Who Weekly issue 1, cover dated 17 October 1979
- Editor: Jason Quinn
- Categories: Science fiction television
- Frequency: 13 times a year (once every four weeks)
- Circulation: 16,304 (average per issue) (ABC data for 2020)
- Founded: 11 October 1979
- First issue: 17 October 1979 (634 issues as of September 2026)
- Company: Panini Comics
- Country: United Kingdom
- Language: English
- Website: Official website
- ISSN: 0957-9818

Doctor Who Magazine (abbreviated as DWM) is a magazine devoted to the British science fiction television series Doctor Who.

Launched in 1979 as Doctor Who Weekly, the magazine became a monthly publication the following year. In 1990 it switched to a four-weekly schedule, publishing 13 issues a year, along with triannual deluxe Special Editions (2002–) and Bookazines (2013–). Regular issues include interviews, behind-the-scenes articles on television episodes and Doctor Who in other media, as well as producing its own comic strip.

Its founding editor was Dez Skinn, and the longest-serving editor was Tom Spilsbury who served from 2007 to 2017. He was succeeded by Marcus Hearn, who took over from Spilsbury in July 2017. The incumbent editor is Jason Quinn, who took over from Hearn in September 2023. DWM is recognised by Guinness World Records as the longest running TV tie-in magazine, celebrating 40 years of continuous publication on 11 October 2019. The magazine published its 600th issue on 1 February 2024.

== History ==
Originally geared towards children and predominately featuring comic strips, DWM slowly transformed into a mature magazine, expanding to explore behind-the-scenes aspects of the series and developing the comic strip. Due to its longevity, it is seen as a source of 'official' and exclusive information, sharing a close relationship with the television production team and the BBC.

=== Marvel years (1979–1995) ===
Officially licensed by the BBC, the magazine began life as Doctor Who Weekly in 1979, published by the UK arm of Marvel Comics. The first issue was released on Thursday 11 October with a cover date of 17 October and priced 12 pence.

The magazine moved from weekly to monthly publication with issue 44 in September 1980, becoming Doctor Who – A Marvel Monthly with a cover price of 30 pence – although the tagline was not part of the name, but simply a descriptor which appeared on many of Marvel UK's monthly titles at that point. The indicia continued describing the publication as 'Doctor Who Weekly' until issue 48. The cover title changed to Doctor Who Monthly with issue 61, and then to The Official Doctor Who Magazine with issue 85 in February 1984. It became The Doctor Who Magazine with issue 99 in April 1985, and simply Doctor Who Magazine with issue 107 in December 1985. The magazine has remained under that title ever since; an exception was made for issue 397 (June 2008) when the cover featured only the words Bad Wolf, following transmission of the Doctor Who episode "Turn Left" on Saturday 21 June.

Despite the BBC discontinuing production of Doctor Who in 1989, the magazine continued to be published, providing new adventures in the form of comics. In 1990 the magazine started appearing once every four weeks (13 times a year).

=== Panini years (1995–present) ===
DWM is now published by Panini Comics, which purchased the title along with the rest of the Marvel UK catalogue in 1995. In 2006, however, it lost its exclusivity when BBC Worldwide launched its own comic, Doctor Who Adventures, aimed at a younger audience.

DWM's 400th issue was published in September 2008, and the publication celebrated its 30th anniversary in October 2009. In April 2010, it was confirmed in issue 420 that Doctor Who Magazine now holds the Guinness World Record for "Longest Running Magazine Based on a Television Series." The magazine reached its 500th issue in May 2016. It reached its 600th issue in February 2024.

In April 2011, Panini Comics released a new monthly magazine titled Doctor Who Insider; although it was made in Britain the magazine was published for North America. It was announced on 27 January 2012 that Doctor Who Insider had ceased publication after nine issues. Doctor Who Insider returned for a special edition issue on 1 November 2012.

Panini has begun to digitally restore and reprint older DWM comics in trade paperback format. Twenty-five volumes have been printed so far: two featuring the comics adventures of the Fourth Doctor, one with the adventures of the Fifth Doctor, two featuring the Sixth Doctor, five with the adventures of the Seventh Doctor, four focusing on the Eighth Doctor, one with the adventures of the Ninth Doctor, three featuring the Tenth Doctor, four collecting the adventures of the Eleventh Doctor and four with the adventures of the Twelfth Doctor. Panini also published a one-shot magazine-format reprinting of the complete Ninth Doctor strips in 2006 and most of the Tenth Doctor and Martha Jones strips in 2008. DWM issue 426 reported that the series had been postponed; it eventually resumed with the publication of "The Crimson Hand" in May 2012.

In November 2020, Panini published The Daleks, a new compilation of the Dalek comic strips originally published on the back pages of early issues of 1960s comic TV Century 21. Unlike previous reprints, the majority of pages in the collection were scanned from the original artwork.

=== Editors ===
DWM's founding editor was Dez Skinn, who had been headhunted by Stan Lee (the figurehead and creative leader at Marvel) to oversee the revitalisation of the ailing UK division. "[I] had the idea for a Doctor Who title around 1975. . . . I felt it would be a perfect stablemate to my then-current House of Hammer magazine, and could be produced in the same format, with a mix of comic strips and features, going behind and beyond the TV series." To make the publication work, Skinn needed a comic strip to be at the heart of the publication, and successfully negotiated for the rights to the Doctor Who comics licence with the BBC which had previously been held by Polystyle Publications since late 1964. DWCC Launching in 1979 as a weekly comic strip based publication, Skinn handed over the reins in 1980.

His immediate successor as editor, Paul Neary, was faced with significant falling sales following the premature end of the programme's 17th season in January 1980. Neary first attempted to target the publication at a younger readership; when this failed to halt falling sales, he instead relaunched the title as a monthly magazine. Subsequent editors gradually realised then surpassed Skinn's vision of a more mature magazine, getting rid of secondary and tertiary comic strips for regular features and articles going behind the scenes of the show.

During 1995 Panini bought out Marvel UK, and thus took control of DWM. The incumbent editor Gary Russell – who would go on to produce the Big Finish Productions Doctor Who audios dramas from their inception, and to work for BBC Wales as a Script Editor on the Doctor Who spin-offs The Sarah Jane Adventures and Torchwood – was 'asked to leave'. The editorship was taken over by recently hired comic strip editor, Gary Gillatt.

Gillatt edited the magazine for the next five years, except for issue 255 in 1997 which was guest-edited by one of the stars of the Doctor Who TV show Sophie Aldred (who had portrayed the Seventh Doctor's companion Ace during the late 1980s).

In February 2001, the editor at the time Alan Barnes, oversaw the transformation of the comic strip from black and white to full-colour with the first episode of the Eighth Doctor story Ophidius (issue 300).

Clayton Hickman became the editor in 2002, launching the deluxe triannual Special Editions of the magazine (which are running to this day) and the Doctor Who Annual, later Storybook, in 1996 (which ceased publication after five years). He was the first editor since John Freeman to work on the publication with the show actually in production.

Subsequent editor Tom Spilsbury took over in 2007, later launching the deluxe triannual Bookazine (running parallel to the Special Editions, and again still being produced to this day). Spilsbury would stay at the helm for a decade, becoming the longest-serving editor in the process, handing over the editorship to Marcus Hearn in 2017. Hearn announced his departure as editor in issue 594 in 2023, and he was succeeded by Jason Quinn.

Editor	Duration	Issues Range	Total
Dez Skinn	1979–1980	1–22	22
Paul Neary	1980–1981	23–48	26
Alan McKenzie	1981–1985	49–96	48
Sheila Cranna	1985–1988	97 & 107–136	31
Cefn Ridout	1985	98–106	9
John Freeman	1988–1992	137–185	49
Gary Russell	1992–1995	186–200 (solo); 201–221 (co-editor with Marcus Hearn); 222 (solo)	37
Gary Gillatt	1995–2000	223–254; 256–261 (solo); 262–263 (co-editor with Alan Barnes); 264–271 (solo); 272–292 (co-editor with Alan Barnes)	69
Sophie Aldred	1997	255	1
Alan Barnes	1998–2001	262–263; 272–292 (co-editor with Gary Gillatt); 293–312 (solo); 313 (co-editor with Clayton Hickman)	44
Clayton Hickman	2002–2007	313 (co-editor with Alan Barnes); 314–386 (solo)	74
Tom Spilsbury	2007–2017	387–515 (final issue joint with Peter Ware & Richard Atkinson)	129
Peter Ware & Richard Atkinson	2017	515 (joint with Tom Spilsbury)	1
Marcus Hearn	1993–1994; 2017–2023	201–221 (co-editor with Gary Russell); 516–594 (solo)	100
Jason Quinn	2023–	595–	Ongoing

=== Controversy ===
The December 2017 issue (Issue 518) of Doctor Who Magazine featured a hidden profane message in a column written by an anonymous writer under the pseudonym 'The Watcher' on page 82. Soon after the message's discovery, the column was amended in the digital version of the issue. It was later revealed that the writer of the column had been Nicholas Pegg, an occasional writer for the magazine and one of the Dalek operators on the television series. BBC Worldwide had told the Daily Mirror that "The matter was raised with the publisher who have dismissed the writer." Private Eye later reported that editor Tom Spilsbury's decision to leave the magazine stemmed from "falling-out" with BBC Wales over DWM's coverage of Doctor Who spin-off Class, and that he was "paid off" in the summer of 2017 to leave the publication. However, in the following issue of Private Eye, a letter from Spilsbury was published, denying these allegations.

=== Circulation ===
The magazine joined the Audit Bureau of Circulations in June 2010, giving the average figure per issue for every six months, meaning circulation figures have only been made available officially for six-monthly periods since August of that year, when the publication recorded an average circulation of 35,374 per issue for between January and June 2010.

Since then, the average figures per issue have fluctuated, reaching a high of 36,151 for the July–December 2013 period, but generally decreasing since then, with the occasional small rise.

The last-known six-month certified average circulation figure per issue was 20,635 for the period between July and December 2018. The magazine's average circulation figure per issue for January to June 2019 was due to be released on 15 August 2019 as part of the bureau's batch of Consumer Magazines figures for that period. However, for the first time since August 2010 no official data was published, after the magazine changed its reporting frequency to annually. The average circulation figure per issue for the 13 editions between January and December 2019, subsequently published by the bureau on 13 February 2020, was 17,586, comprising 10,239 paid single copies, 7,213 paid subscriptions and 134 free copies.

The average circulation per issue for the 13 editions between January and December 2020 was 16,304, according to data published by the bureau on 11 February 2021. It comprised 8,330 paid single copies, 7,838 paid subscriptions and 136 free copies.

The magazine stopped being registered with the Audit Bureau of Circulations at some point after then, meaning no figures for 2021 were published as part of the bureau's batch of Consumer Magazines figures that were released on 17 February 2022.

== Content ==
Each issue of DWM contains a main comic strip (occasionally with secondary and tertiary strips or illustrated short stories), regular features (such as a letters page, previews and reviews of TV episodes, books and audios, and updates from the transmedia world of Doctor Who), and special articles (sometimes one-offs, sometimes in serial form, including interviews, analyses, and making-ofs).

=== Comic strip ===
DWM has featured an ongoing main comic strip starring the Doctor since its first issue in October 1979. The DWM strip thus took over from what has become known as the 'Polystyle era' (1964–1979) of Doctor Who comic strips. Paul Scoones, an historian of the Doctor Who comic strip, writes: 'First launched in the pages of TV Comic in November 1964, the comic strip version of Doctor Who is just one year younger than the television series on which it is based. The strip appeared almost every week: first in TV Comic, then in Countdown and TV Action before returning to TV Comic. All these titles were produced by a company called Polystyle Publications (formally TV Publications), which held the rights to publish a Doctor Who comic [strip] until May 1979 when the last instalment of the strip appeared [...] Once relinquished by Polystyle, the rights were soon snapped up by Marvel UK, who created their own ongoing comic [strip]. This new strip [...] continues to this day'. The main comic strip features the contemporary television Doctor (beginning with the Fourth Doctor who was on TV at the time DWM launched), sometimes with his on-screen companion(s), and sometimes with companion(s) created by the DWM writers. During some of the period when Doctor Who was off-air, in the wake of the Seventh Doctor, the DWM main strip featured stories with all the previous Doctors (1994–1996) but continued with the Eighth Doctor after the broadcast of the TV movie (1996). In 2004, when the series returned to television, showrunner Russell T Davies offered to let DWM write and publish the official regeneration scene from the Eighth Doctor to the Ninth Doctor. Although work was done on this storyline, then editor Clayton Hickman and writer Scott Gray eventually turned down the offer as they felt they couldn't do such an important event justice under the constraints imposed by the TV series' continuity. In October 2018 (issue 531), the main comic strip began featuring the Thirteenth Doctor in "The Warmonger".

As well as a main strip, DWM has also featured other comics strips over the years. In its first incarnation as Doctor Who Weekly the main strip was accompanied by a specially commissioned secondary strip exploring stories from across the Whoniverse, and a tertiary strip of reprints from other Marvel publications. The secondary strip continued with the transformation of the magazine into a monthly publication, finally ending in May 1982 (issue 64), albeit becoming more infrequent over the previous year. A tertiary strip, named 'Tales from the TARDIS', ran in Doctor Who Weekly until late April 1980 (issue 29). These re-used adaptations of classic works of literary science fiction previously published in Marvel Classics Comics (USA). In late May 1980 (issue 33), the tertiary strip returned reprinting the "Dalek Chronicles" (aka "Dalek Tapes"), a strip originally published as a one-pager in TV Century 21 as "The Daleks" (1965–1967). This tertiary Dalek strip ended in September 1982 (issue 68) after completing about half of the original run. Since 1982, other strips have appeared again from time to time. For instance, in the 1990s a Cyberman one-pager strip was featured on the inside cover (3 August 1994 – 8 May 1996 [issues 215–238]). Titled "The Cybermen", the series was set on their home planet of Mondas prior to the events of the television episode The Tenth Planet (1966). The TV Century 21 comic "The Daleks" was also resurrected for a short time in 1997 (12 March-30 July [issues 249–254]), drawn in the same style as the 1960s original and continuing the story from where it had left off by showing the Daleks attacking Earth. Other than this and since then, secondary and tertiary strips have been rare and usually either one or two episodes.

The DWM comic strips were all originally printed in black and white (except with a minor – page-count-wise – exception for two pages of "The Tides of Time" [July 1982: issue 66]). The main strip, beginning in 1979 with the Fourth Doctor story "The Iron Legion" (17 October – 5 December [issues 1–8]), began being issued in colour as of issue 300 in 2001 with the Eighth Doctor story "Ophidius" (February–May [issues 300–303]). However, as early as December 1980 colourised reprints of the early Fourth Doctor main strip and secondary strips appeared in Marvel USA publications: Marvel Premiere: Doctor Who (every two months between December 1980 and June 1981 [issues 57–60]) successfully trialled the concept for an American audience to determine if it would attract enough readers; a Doctor Who comic series being launched in 1984. The series came to an end with issue 23 in August 1986, having colourised and reprinted all the Fourth Doctor strips and four of the six strips of the Fifth Doctor era, as well as 24 of the 27 DWM secondary strip stories originally published between 1979 and 1982. Reprints of the original DWM strips have also appeared in their original black and white as well as colourised in a dizzying number of formats, especially during the Marvel years (1979–1995). These Marvel UK (or Marvel licensed) parallel publications were: Doctor Who Magazine Specials (1980–1996); Doctor Who Magazine Graphic Novels (1989–1993); Doctor Who Classic Comics (1992–1994) and Doctor Who Yearbooks (1992–1996). Many of these publications also printed original strips as well. Another original Doctor Who strip also appeared in The Incredible Hulk Presents comic series (1989), and the Doctor appeared as a guest character in the first Death's Head series (1989; rejigged and reprinted as "Incomplete Death's Head" in 1993). Spin-off strips and reprints have become much more limited and much more focused during the Panini Years (1995–present). There was a short-lived original Eighth Doctor strip for the Radio Times (1996–1997), some original Ninth and Tenth Doctor strips in the Annual and Storybooks (2006–2010), and two sets of reprints of the Ninth Doctor strips (2006) and some of the Tenth Doctor strips (2008) in the relaunched and rebranded Special Editions (2002–present). Returning to the origins of the DWM main strip, Panini licensed IDW, an American comic book company, for new digitalised colour reprints of Fourth, Fifth, Sixth, and Seventh Doctor stories. Beginning in January 2008 and running into 2013, IDW printed its Doctor Who Classics monthly comic book series, going on to collect the colourised strips into various trade paperbacks and omnibus editions.

Notable writers and artists who have worked on the DWM comic strips, in all its myriad forms include John Wagner, Pat Mills, Alan Moore, Grant Morrison, Dave Gibbons, Mike McMahon, John Ridgway and Ian Edginton. Supporting characters created by such writers for DWM have even crossed over from the comic to other spin-off media include Frobisher, the shape-changing companion of the Sixth and Seventh Doctors who would appear in Big Finish audios; Abslom Daak, the Dalek Killer; the Special Executive, who would later appear in Marvel's Captain Britain; and the villainous Beep the Meep.

During the mid-2000s, in the wake of the successful return of Doctor Who to television, the BBC began offering multiple comic strip publishing licences effectively ending the monopoly held by DWM since they had taken over where Polystyle had left off. In 2006, the partwork publishers GE Fabbri acquired the license to produce Doctor Who – Battles in Time, a fortnightly magazine with a trading card game and its own Doctor Who comic strip. The final issue (number 70) was released on 13 May 2009. Around the same time, IMC launched Doctor Who Adventures, its comic strip and features aimed at 6 to 13-year-olds, a younger demographic than the DWM readership. Initially published every fortnight, from 2008 it went weekly, returning to fortnightly in May 2013, then monthly in 2014. In April 2015, the title was purchased by Panini, the publishers of DWM, who rebooted the publication beginning again with issue 1, changing it to bi-monthly in late 2016. On 19 June 2017, Panini confirmed that publication of the magazine was to be paused after issue 24. A special one-off edition was released in January 2019. Finally, IDW – who were reprinting early DWM strips in their Doctor Who Classics series – launched a parallel range of ongoing comics featuring the Tenth Doctor in early 2008. Over the next six years, until the end of 2013, there were series and ones-shots featuring the Tenth then Eleventh Doctor, even producing a cross over with "Star Trek: The Next Generation / Doctor Who : Assimilation2". IDW ceded their license to Titan in 2014, who have since created a complex number of parallel Doctor Who series for both nu-Who and classic Doctors. Titan have collected the IDW and Titan comics into various format collectors editions, scaling back production since the beginning of the Thirteenth Doctor era.

=== Cartoons and illustrated short stories ===
The publication also features parody cartoons, most notably "Doctor Who?", a humorous look at the series by Tim Quinn and Dicky Howett. This was principally a three-panel comic strip, though occasionally page-long parodies were featured. Also, between 1989 and 1992 "The Comic Assassins" was a series of parody strips by Steve Noble and Kev F. Sutherland. "Doctor Who?"'s spiritual successor was the single-panel strip "Doctor Whoah!" by 'Baxter'. Embedded into the 'Galaxy Forum' letters page, it lampooned a recent episode, DVD release of stories or other such event by showing alternative, exaggerated and expanded versions of Doctor Who scenes. For example, after the broadcast of "Partners in Crime" (2008), the strip portrayed the Doctor's arrival on the 'Planet of the Hats', referred to in the episode. The strip was known for its characters who are depicted as having no pupils in their eyes. Since 2014, "Doctor Whoah!" has been replaced by "The Daft Dimension", a similarly sized strip in three panels by Lew Stringer.

DWM has also published illustrated short stories in its magazine and parallel publications, most cohesively during the Marvel years. Beginning in Doctor Who Weekly on 9 April 1980 (issue 26), a sequence of these short stories ran for eight issues, returning is shorts burst for a number of issues every few years up until 1996. Occasional illustrated short stories have appeared since then, including the many parallel publications in both Marvel and Panini years. In addition, there was also a run of 'Brief Encounters', very short one or two-page illustrated stories that ran from 28 November 1990 (issue 167) through to 6 July 1994 (issue 214) as well as in contemporary "Specials" and "Yearbooks" between 1991 and 1992.

=== Regular features and special articles ===
Other regular features of the magazine include the news section "Gallifrey Guardian", which has run since nearly the beginning of the magazine; the letters page "Galaxy Forum" which – as well as containing the "Daft Dimension" strip – features other small sub-sections, such as "Ask DWM!" (where readers' questions about the show are answered), "On This Month" (which looks at an old issue on the anniversary of its publication) and "WhoTube" (which highlights "Doctor Who"-themed videos which can be viewed online); reviews of television episodes and merchandise (in "The DWM Review", known for a time as "After Image", "Off the Shelf", and "Shelf Life"); the "Time Team", which involves four fans watching every Doctor Who story in order from the beginning; and, since production restarted on the series in 2004, a regular column "Production Notes" by the show's executive producer. From 2004 to 2009 the column was written by Russell T Davies, and from January 2010 to July 2017, Steven Moffat took over the page, although other writers and production staff have from time-to-time written the column. Also, on the final page of magazine, there is a section called "Wotcha!" (compiled by 'The Watcher'), a comedy page with such recurring features as, 'A History of Doctor Who in 100 Objects', 'Supporting Artist of the Month', a spoof 'Top Ten', the 'Stockbridge English Dictionary' (a variation on a game from I'm Sorry I Haven't a Clue) and a true or false quiz "The Six Faces of Delusion". Prior to this, the slot was taken up by a page called "Who on Earth is...", featuring a short interview with someone previously (or currently) involved in Doctor Who (say, a member of the cast).

A single-page 'opinion' column has often been part of the magazine's mix – past columns have included "Fluid Links" by Matt Jones, "The Life and Times of Jackie Jenkins" by 'Jackie Jenkins', "It's the End... But" by 'The Watcher', "You Are Not Alone" by Jonathan Morris (as 'Neil Harris') and "Relative Dimensions" by author (and former "Time Team" member) Jacqueline Rayner. The format has changed over the years, but the news, letters, reviews, and comic strip have all been present consistently since the early 1980s.

The magazine also features interviews with the cast and crew of the television show (including the old episodes), and reports from the set of the current series, written by Benjamin Cook or Jason Arnopp. The behind-the-scenes stories of all of the 1963–1989 episodes have been documented in Andrew Pixley's "DWM Archive", and detailed analysis of certain significant serials are covered in "The Fact of Fiction", usually written by former DWM editor Alan Barnes, Jonathan Morris or David Bailey. "The DWM Review" is currently written predominantly by Graham Kibble-White, former editor Gary Gillatt, Paul Kirkley, Martin Ruddock and Matt Michael. Previous reviewers include Vanessa Bishop, Craig Hinton (died in 2006), and Gary Russell, who subsequently became the magazine's editor.

== DWM Parallel Publications: Marvel Years (1979–1995) ==
During the Marvel years (1979–1995), Doctor Who Magazine produced three types of "Deluxe edition" series issued in parallel to the main publication. These were the semi-regular Specials generally issued twice a year seasonally, and most usually labelled "Summer" and "Winter" (1980–1996); Yearbooks, essentially annuals, issued once a year in advance and for Christmas (1992–1996); and Poster Magazines, a short run of more visually orientated periodicals with single themes (1994–1996). All these series came to an end in the wake of Panini acquiring Marvel, and consequently, Doctor Who Magazine in 1995.

In addition, and since its very beginning, DWM comic strips have been reprinted and – on a few occasions had their original release – in many other publications and formats. Reprinting of DWM strips began as early as 1980 in parallel serial publications, and over the years there have been a number of such comic reprints and collections, many of which colourised the original strips. In addition, there have also been some original strips issued through these publications. Some series have even reprinted some of the earlier pre-DWM Polystyle Publications Doctor Who comic strips that appeared in TV Comic, which began in 1964 and ended when DWM gained the comic strip licence in 1979. There have also been original Doctor Who strips in other Marvel publications, and the Doctor appearing in other original Marvel strips (all of which dovetail with the main DWM strip). Finally, other publishers have reprinted DWM strips under licence.

=== Doctor Who Comics USA (1980–1986) ===
The first series of reprints of DWM comic strips began in late 1980, only a year or so after the original publication in 1979. These reprints were for the American market, and consisted of four issues in the Marvel Premiere series. The Marvel Premiere series was considered a testing ground to determine if a character or concept could attract enough readers to justify launching their own series. The four issues were considered a success, and so eventually became a series beginning in 1984, titled simply Doctor Who. Again, these were reprints were from DWM, and began soon after where Marvel Premiere left off (skipping a two part strip, perhaps appropriately titled "Timeslip" [issues 17–18], a Fourth Doctor story featuring the First, Second, and Third Doctors; this was eventually published in Doctor Who issue 18). All these strip reprints were colourised for the first time; as were supporting secondary Doctorless strips also taken from DWM (or, on limited occasions, DWM Specials). Both Marvel Premiere: Doctor Who and Doctor Who had regular features and special articles.

- Marvel Premiere: Doctor Who (Issues 57–60): From December 1980 to June 1981 once every two months, Marvel USA experimented with the DWM Doctor Who comic strip for an American audience. For four issues they reprinted the earliest two Fourth Doctor main strips. These were now colourised, and with new covers displaying the Doctor Who logo of the time. These four issues of Marvel Premiere: Doctor Who were a test run for an American style Doctor Who comic, which eventually began publishing in 1984. In some editions there were just strips (with the exception of a letters page); in some editions there were also short features. Furthermore, in two editions there were secondary strips, in one instance a DWM secondary strip, and in the other a non-Doctor Who strip – both of which were in colour.
- Doctor Who (Marvel Comics USA) (Issues 1–23): From October 1984 to August 1986, and following the success of the trial run of Marvel Premiere: Doctor Who, Marvel Comics published a monthly comic book series in America titled simply Doctor Who, that reprinted the Fourth Doctor and some of the earliest Fifth Doctor main strips. Beginning soon after where Marvel Premiere: Doctor Who had concluded (skipping the third story of the original run, which was eventually published later in the run), once again the strips were colourised and had new covers, but they also appeared in a 'glossy format' rather than traditional American style rough paper print. There were also DWM secondary strips (again, colourised from the original black and white); or on limited occasions strips taken from early DWM Specials. The comic had regular features, from issue three a letters column and, from issue 13, "Who Knows", described as 'Happenings in the world of Doctor Who'. There were also occasional short special articles on the television show, such as overviews of characters, and interviews with cast and crew members.

The list below covers all comic strip colourised reprints and notable special articles:

List of Doctor Who Comics USA

USA#	Title	Issue	Date	Pages	Contents	References
01	Marvel Premiere: Doctor Who	57	December 1980	36	Comic strip (colourised reprints): "The Iron Legion" [1–4 of 8] [DWM issues 1–4] (4D); Articles: Full-page illustration: "The Five Doctors"; "Who Is the Doctor" (2-page written feature on the Doctors); Full page illustrations: "The Tardis and K-9"; "The Daleks"; "The Doctor's Most Fearsome Foes!"	MPDW
02	Marvel Premiere: Doctor Who	58	February 1981	36	Comic strip (colourised reprints): "The Iron Legion" [5–8 of 8] [DWM issues 5–8] (4D); "K-9's Finest Hour" ^{[a]} [1 of 1] [DWM issue 12; secondary strip] (4D Doctor-lite)	MPDW
03	Marvel Premiere: Doctor Who	59	April 1981	36	Comic strip (colourised reprints): "City of the Cursed" (aka "City of the Damned") [1–4 of 8] [DWM issues 9–12] (4D); "Full Moon on the Highway!" (Werewolf by Night comic strip (non-Doctor Who strip))	MPDW
04	Marvel Premiere: Doctor Who	60	June 1981	36	Comic strip (colourised reprints): "City of the Cursed" [5–8 of 8] [DWM issues 13–16] (4D); Articles: "Hello, Goodbye, Hello" (or, "Who's Coming and Who's Going") by Mary Jo Duffy (a personal account of watching Doctor Who) with various illustrations (Leela; UNIT personnel; Sarah Jane; Fifth Doctor; Fourth Doctor and a Zygon)	MPDW
05	Doctor Who	01	October 1984	36	Comic strip (colourised reprints): "The Star Beast" ^{[b]} [1–3 of 8] [DWM issues 19–21] (4D); "The Return of the Daleks" [1–4 of 4] [DWM issues 1–4; secondary strip] (Doctorless); Articles: "Who's Who" (Overview of the history of the Doctor Who TV show)	DWUSA
06	Doctor Who	02	November 1984	36	Comic strip (colourised reprints): "The Star Beast" [4–8 of 8] [DWM issues 22–26] (4D); "Throwback: The Soul of a Cyberman" [1–2 of 3] [DWM issues 5–6; secondary strip] (Doctorless); Articles: Full page illustrations: "The TARDIS and K9"; "The Doctor's Most Fearsome Foes!"; "The Daleks"; "The Five Doctors"	DWUSA
07	Doctor Who	03	December 1984	36	Comic strip (colourised reprints): "The Dogs of Doom" [1–4 of 8] [DWM issues 27–30] (4D); "Throwback: The Soul of a Cyberman" [3 of 3] [DWM issue 7; secondary strip] (Doctorless); "The Final Quest" [1 of 1] [DWM issue 8; secondary strip] (Doctorless); Articles: "The Fans of Doctor Who"; "The Doctor Who Bookshelf" (reference books review)	DWUSA
08	Doctor Who	04	January 1985	36	Comic strip (colourised reprints): "The Dogs of Doom" [5–8 of 8] [DWM issues 31–34] (4D); "A Tale of the Time Lords: The Stolen Tardis" [1–3 of 3] [DWM issues 9–11; secondary strip] (Doctorless)	DWUSA
09	Doctor Who	05	February 1985	36	Comic strip (colourised reprints): "The Time Witch" [1–4 of 4] [DWM issues 35–38] (4D); "Warlord of the Ogrons" [1–2 of 2] [DWM issues 13–14; secondary strip] (Doctorless); Articles: "Fellow Travelers" (On Companions); "John Nathan-Turner and Colin Baker: The Producer and the Doctor"	DWUSA
10	Doctor Who	06	March 1985	36	Comic strip (colourised reprints): "Dragon's Claw" [1–5 of 7] [DWM issues 39–43] (4D); "Deathworld" [1–2 of 2] [DWM issues 15–16; secondary strip] (Doctorless); "Abslom Daak… Dalek-Killer" [1 of 4] [DWM issue 17; secondary strip] (Doctorless)	DWUSA
11	Doctor Who	07	April 1985	36	Comic strip (colourised reprints): "Dragon's Claw" [6–7 of 7] [DWM issues 44–45] (4D); "Abslom Daak… Dalek-Killer" [2–3 of 4] [DWM issues 18–19; secondary strip] (Doctorless); Articles: "The Doctor Who Bookshelf" (Novelisations)	DWUSA
12	Doctor Who	08	May 1985	36	Comic strip (colourised reprints): "The Collector" [1 of 1] [DWM issue 46] (4D); "Dreamers of Death" [1–2 of 2] [DWM issues 47–48] (4D); "Abslom Daak… Dalek-Killer" [4 of 4] [DWM issue 20; secondary strip] (Doctorless)	DWUSA
13	Doctor Who	09	June 1985	36	Comic strip (colourised reprints): "The Life Bringer!" [1–2 of 2] [DWM issues 49–50] (4D); "Star Tigers [I]" ^{[c]} [1–2 of 4] [DWM issues 27–28; secondary strip] (Doctorless); Articles: "A Probable History of the Daleks"	DWUSA
14	Doctor Who	10	July 1985	36	Comic strip (colourised reprints): "War of the Words" [1 of 1] [DWM issue 51] (4D); "Spider-God" [1 of 1] [DWM issue 52] (4D); "Star Tigers [I]" [3–4 of 4] [DWM issues 29–30; secondary strip] (Doctorless); Articles: "A Probable History of the Cybermen"	DWUSA
15	Doctor Who	11	August 1985	36	Comic strip (colourised reprints): "The Deal" [1 of 1] [DWM issue 53] (4D); "End of the Line" [1 of 2] [DWM issue 54] (4D); "Star Tigers [II]" ^{[d]} [1–2 of 3] [DWM issues 44–45; secondary strip] (Doctorless); Articles: "Interview with Terrance Dicks" (Doctor Who writer)	DWUSA
16	Doctor Who	12	September 1985	36	Comic strip (colourised reprints): "End of the Line" [2 of 2] [DWM issue 55] (4D); "Free-Fall Warriors [1–2 of 2] [DWM issues 56–57] (4D); "Star Tigers [II]" [3 of 3] [DWM issue 46; secondary strip] (Doctorless); Articles: "Doctor Who Convention Calendar"	DWUSA
17	Doctor Who	13	October 1985	36	Comic strip (colourised reprints): "Junk-Yard Demon" [1–2 of 2] [DWM issues 58–59] (4D); "Yonder… The Yeti" ^{[e]} [1–2 of 2] [DWM issues 31–34; secondary strip] (Doctorless); Articles: "The Doctor Who Bookshelf" (Novelisations)	DWUSA
18	Doctor Who	14	November 1985	36	Comic strip (colourised reprints): "The Neutron Knights" [1 of 1] [DWM issue 60] (4D); "A Ship Called Sudden Death" [1 of 1] [DWM Special Summer 1982] (Doctorless); "The Fabulous Idiot" [1 of 1] [DWM Special Summer 1982] (Doctorless); "Black Legacy" [1–4 of 4] [DWM issues 35–38; secondary strip] (Doctorless); Articles: "The Master Log (1)"	DWUSA
19	Doctor Who	15	December 1985	36	Comic strip (colourised reprints): "The Tides of Time" [1–2 of 7] [DWM issues 61–62] (5D); "Business as Usual" [1–4 of 4] [DWM issues 40–43; secondary strip] (Doctorless); Articles: "The Master Log (2)"	DWUSA
20	Doctor Who	16	January 1986	36	Comic strip (colourised reprints): "The Tides of Time" [3–4 of 7] [DWM issues 63–64] (5D); "Ship of Fools" ^{[f]} [1–2 of 2] [DWM issues 23–24; secondary strip] (Doctorless); Articles: "The Peter Davison Interview" [Part 1]	DWUSA
21	Doctor Who	17	February 1986	36	Comic strip (colourised reprints): "The Tides of Time" [5–6 of 7] [DWM issues 65–66] (5D); "Devil of the Deep" [1 of 1] [DWM issue 61; secondary strip] (Doctorless); "Crisis on Kaldor" [1 of 1] [DWM issue 50; secondary strip] (Doctorless); Articles: "The Peter Davison Interview" [Part 2]	DWUSA
22	Doctor Who	18	March 1986	36	Comic strip (colourised reprints): "The Tides of Time" [7 of 7] [DWM issue 67] (5D); "Timeslip" [1–2 of 2] [DWM issue 17–18] (4D & 1D, 2D, 3D); "Twilight of the Silurians" [1–2 of 2] [DWM issues 21–22; secondary strip] (Doctorless); Articles: "Recurring Evils (Part 1)"	DWUSA
23	Doctor Who	19	April 1986	36	Comic strip (colourised reprints): "Stars Fell on Stockbridge" [1–2 of 2] [DWM issues 68–69] (5D); "The Touchdown on Deneb 7" [1 of 1] [DWM issue 48; secondary strip] (4D Doctor-lite); "The Outsider" [1 of 2] [DWM issue 25; secondary strip] (Doctorless); Articles: "Recurring Evils (Part 2)"	DWUSA
24	Doctor Who	20	May 1986	36	Comic strip (colourised reprints): "The Stockbridge Horror" [1–2 of 6] [DWM issues 70–71] (5D); "The Outsider" [2 of 2] [DWM issue 26; secondary strip] (Doctorless); "The Greatest Gamble" [1 of 1] [DWM issue 56; secondary strip] (Doctorless); Articles: "The Doctor Who Bookshelf" (Factual and Novelisations)	DWUSA
25	Doctor Who	21	June 1986	36	Comic strip (colourised reprints): "The Stockbridge Horror" [3–4 of 6] [DWM issues 72–73] (5D); "Skywatch-7 [I]" ^{[g]} [1 of 2] [DWM issue 58; secondary strip] (Doctorless); "The Gods Walk Among Us" [1 of 1] [DWM issue 59; secondary strip] (Doctorless)	DWUSA
26	Doctor Who	22	July 1986	36	Comic strip (colourised reprints): "The Stockbridge Horror" [5–6 of 6] [DWM issues 74–75] (5D); "Skywatch-7 [II]" ^{[g]} [2 of 2] [DWM Winter Special 1981] (Doctorless); "The Fires Down Below" [1 of 1] [DWM issue 64; secondary strip] (Doctorless); Articles: "Doctor Who? by Timm Quinn & Dicky Howett" (on the DWM short parody comic strips); "Fan Clubs"	DWUSA
27	Doctor Who	23	August 1986	36	Comic strip (colourised reprints): "Lunar Lagoon" [1–2 of 2] [DWM issues 76–77] (5D); "Voyage to the End of the Universe" [1 of 1] [DWM issue 49; secondary strip] (Doctorless); Also: "An Unearthly Child: The Unscreened Edition" [1 of 1] [DWM Winter Special 1983/84 (1983)] (Parody comic strip)	DWUSA
Notes: a Doctor Who: Marvel Premiere ran only one secondary strip from DWM, in the second issue. Unlike the main strip, however, it did not begin by reprinting the secondary strip from the first issue of Doctor Who Weekly. Rather, K-9's Finest Hour came from issue 12 (2 January 1980). The previous secondary strips ("The Return of the Daleks", "Throwback: The Soul of a Cyberman", "The Final Quest", and "A Tale of the Time Lords: The Stolen Tardis") would all run in order from the first issue of Doctor Who (Marvel USA) to issue 4; with issue 5 printing the story after K-9's Finest Hour.; b Doctor Who (Marvel USA) began by reprinting the fourth story from the main comic strip of DWM, Doctor Who: Marvel Premiere having printed the first two main strips. These publications thus skipped the third story of the run, "Timeslip" (issues 17–18; 6–13 February 1980). Perhaps this was because while it was a Fourth Doctor strip, it also featured the First, Second, and Third Doctors, and was felt not to be an appropriate way to launch the new publication.; c The previous issue of Doctor Who (Marvel USA) had reprinted as its secondary strip the final episode of "Abslom Daak… Dalek-Killer", the secondary strip from DWM issue 20. This issue of Doctor Who (Marvel USA) skipped ahead to reprint "Star Tigers" [I] as its secondary strip, which began in DWM issue 27 (as a secondary strip). Thus Doctor Who (Marvel USA) did not reprint the DWM secondary strips "Twilight of the Silurians", "Ship of Fools", and "The Outsider". This was no doubt done because "Star Tigers" [I] featured the character Abslom Daak and thus had continuity with the previous issue of Doctor Who (Marvel USA). These three strips were, however, reprinted later in the run, although not in the original order.; d Once again, as with previous issues of Doctor Who (Marvel USA), the secondary strip misses out reprinting a number of other secondary strip from DWM in order to continue the adventures of Abslom Daak in the second and final "Star Tigers" story. "Star Tigers" [II] begins in issue 44 of DWM with "Star Tigers" [I] concluding in issue 30, thus the secondary strips "Yonder… The Yeti", "Black Legacy", and "Business as Usual" are skipped (although DWM carried no secondary strip in issues 39). However, these three skipped DWM secondary strips appeared in Doctor Who (Marvel USA) issues 13–15, after the conclusion of "Star Tigers" [II].; e "Yonder… The Yeti" and the next two secondary strips over the next two issues of Doctor Who (Marvel USA), "Black Legacy" and "Business as Usual", were the second of two sets of secondary comic strips skipped in order to bring continuity to the "Abslom Daak" trilogy ("Abslom Daak… Dalek-Killer", "Star Tigers" [I], and "Star Tigers" [II]) that had appeared non-sequentially in DWM over the year 1980. After "Star Tigers" [II], Doctor Who (Marvel USA) reprinted the second batch in the order of original publication.; f "Ship of Fools" is a reprint of one of the first set of skipped secondary strips that accommodated running the "Abslom Daak" trilogy in order, these secondary strips were originally presented non-sequentially in DWM ("Abslom Daak… Dalek-Killer", "Star Tigers" [I], and "Star Tigers" [II]). "Twilight of the Silurians" and "The Outsider" – also from the first set of skipped secondary strips – were eventually reprinted, although out of sequence, and mixed in with other DWM secondary strips. In effect, from this point on Doctor Who (Marvel USA) freely selects from the remaining DWM secondary strips abandoning tracking of original order of publication entirely. Regular original DWM secondary strips finished as of issue 64, and became less frequent over the last few of these issues. Basically, all the secondary strips from DWM were reprinted colourised from DWM issue 1–46; and of the remaining 11 strips eight were reprinted before Doctor Who (Marvel USA) ceased publication.; g "Skywatch-7" was a two part Doctorless comic strip which had its first part published as a secondary strip in DWM (issue 58) and its second part published in the DWM Winter Special 1981, both of which were released around the same time in late 1981.

Doctor Who (Marvel USA) ceased publication with issue 23 in August 1986. Editor Jim Salicrup explained the reason as being 'poor sales. Despite a good start, and rather good sales in areas where Doctor Who (the television programme) is in syndication, sales have been off. Producing Doctor Who [Marvel USA] in this format has been expensive, and without sufficient sales support it was decided to discontinue [...] rather than sacrifice the quality of the magazine'. Salicrup is essentially referring to the added costs of the glossy paper and the strips needing to go through a process of colouration.

In summary, over the entire run of Marvel Premiere: Doctor Who and Doctor Who the magazine reprinted in colourised form:

- the DWM main comic strip from issue 1 (17 October 1979) through to 77 (June 1983) in consecutive order, with the exception of "Timeslip" (DWM issues 17–18) which was initially skipped but included much later in the run essentially as a Doctor Who (Marvel USA) secondary strip. Thus, the magazine included all the Fourth Doctor strips, and the first four (of a total of six) Fifth Doctor strips.
- the DWM Doctorless secondary strip, mostly in order from the beginning of Doctor Who (Marvel USA) – except for a one part story in Marvel Premiere: Doctor Who – up until issue 13, when "Abslom Daak… Dalek-Killer" was followed by later strips featuring the character. After that, secondary strips were placed increasingly randomly. Over the entire original run of 27 secondary strips in DWM (from issue 1 to 64, after which they came to an end as a continuous feature), Marvel USA comics reprinted 24 of these. The exceptions were the one-part stories: "Star Death" (DWM #47), "4-D War" (DWM #51), and "Black Sun Rising" (DWM #57).
- three Doctorless strips from early DWM Specials (not including a parody strip from DWM Winter Special 1983/84 [1983]). One from the DWM Winter Special 1981 (the second part of story began in DWM); and two from the DWM Special Summer 1982. The Doctor Who Magazine Specials are listed in full in the next subsection.

=== Doctor Who Magazine Specials (1980–1996) ===
From 1980 to 1996 DWM released a series of 'Specials' with an increased page count. Early on, the Specials tended to have a mix of articles and comic strips (both reprints and originals). However, after the first few issues and up to about halfway through the run, the publication tended to be just composed of articles; with the occasional issue dedicated to comic strip reprints, essentially a 'Graphic Novel' (some in the original black & white, some colourised). The second half of the run went back to including a comic strip in article based issues, during which time there were also two 'Graphic Novels' (both in colour, one reprints, one original). Occasionally, issues carried illustrated short stories. The Specials began by being published twice a year during the summer and winter, and were usually, although not always, branded as such. This changed over the period 1987–1989 when there was only one a year (two for anniversaries), and then none in 1990. The twice year schedule resumed in 1991 again with summer and winter editions, before becoming a little more erratic during and after 1994 to the end of the run. The final two issues were devoted to Doctor Who movies: *"Dr. Who and the Daleks" and "Daleks – Invasion Earth: 2150 A.D." (issue 29) and Doctor Who: The Movie (issue 30).

These Specials were not numbered, and sometimes contained no indicia or did not specify their status in the indicia – accordingly, confusion has arisen over the years between the Specials and some one-off DWM comic strip publications from the same period (some named Graphic Novels in their indicia, some with no indicia, or just the title of the publication in the indicia). However, in 2016 DWM provided a pictorial overview of what they considered official DWM Specials in their Doctor Who Magazine: 500 DWM Issues bonus 'Souvenir' publication that came free with DWM issue 500. The list below follows the overview therein, but the issue numbering is imposed for ease of tracking, and was never included in the actual publications. The table below also attempts to capture the flavour of the different types of issue with the labelling 'Seasonal Specials', 'Graphic Novels', 'Anniversary Issues', and 'Movie Specials'. In some cases, however, a single Special can be more than one of these types (such as labelled a seasonal special and an anniversary issue); once again, the numbering is imposed on these issues for ease of tracking the type.

- Seasonal Specials [SS] (which predominated): most usually twice a year for Winter and Summer, and labelled as such. The covers only rarely indicated the year.
- Graphic Novels [GN] (occasional): around half of all the Specials had comic strips, but six were devoted entirely to, or substantially to, comic strips. Note, the numbering here tracks all Marvel era Doctor Who Graphic Novels across its many different publications (for the full overview see the 'Doctor Who Magazine Graphic Novels (1989–1993)' subsection below).
- Anniversary Issues [A] (three editions): for the 25th Anniversary of the television series (November 1988); the 10th Anniversary of Doctor Who Magazine (October 1989); and finally the 30th Anniversary of the television series (November 1993) which was also labelled (unlike the other anniversary editions) a seasonal special for Winter 1993.
- Movie Specials [M] (the final two editions): "The Sixties Dalek Movies" (also labelled "Spring Special") (February 1996); and "The Doctor Who Movie Special" (May 1996) celebrating the return of Doctor Who to the screen after seven years without any television presence.

List of Doctor Who Magazine Specials

Sp#	Series#	Title	Date	Pages	Contents	References
01	SS-01; GN-01	Summer Special [1980]	Summer 1980	52	Graphic Novel^{[a]} Comic strips (reprints of original black & white): "The Iron Legion" [1–8 of 8] [DWM issues 1–8] (4D); "K9's Finest Hour" [1 of 1] [DWM issue 12; secondary strip] (4D Doctor-lite); Articles: "The Day of the Daleks"; "Photofile: The Four Doctors"; "The Cybermen"	DWMS
02	SS-02	Summer Special [1981]	Summer 1981	52	Comic strips (reprints of original black & white): "Timeslip" [1–2 of 2] [DWM issue 17–18] (4D & 1D, 2D, 3D); "Business As Usual" [1–4 of 4] [DWM issues 40–43; secondary strip] (Doctorless); Articles: "Inside The TARDIS [I/II]"; "The Zygons"; "Architects of Fear" (on "the most frightening episodes"); "The Companions of Doctor Who"; "The Man Behind Doctor Who" (on John Nathan-Turner); "The UNIT file [I/II]"	DWMS
03	SS-03	Winter Special [1981]	Winter 1981	52	Comic strips (original black & white): "Tales of the Time Lords: Minatorius" [1 of 1] (Doctorless); "Skywatch-7 [II]" ^{[b]} [2 of 2] (Doctorless); Articles: "From the Archives: Interview with Sue Malden" (Archive Selector at BBC); "Panopticon Report" (1981 Conference); "Interview: Philip Hinchcliffe and Barry Letts"; "Boris the Spider" (on special effects [originally published in Starburst issue 26, 1980]); "The Doctor Who Archives: The War Machines" (on TV serial); "The Doctor Who Archives: The Evil of the Daleks" (on TV serial)	DWMS
04	SS-04	Summer Special [1982]	Summer 1982	48	Comic strips (original black & white): "The Fabulous Idiot" [1 of 1] (Doctorless); "A Ship Called Sudden Death" [1 of 1] (Doctorless); Articles: "The Time Lords Interviews" (Peter Davison & Anthony Ainley); "The Doctor Who Archives: Invasion of the Dinosaurs" (on TV serial); "The Making of Time-Flight" (on TV serial); "John Friedlander: Maker of Monsters"; "Through the Lens" (preserving Doctor Who television episode); "The Doctor Who Archives: The Robots of Death" (on TV serial); Bonus: "Pull-Out Full Colour Monster Guide"	DWMS
05	SS-05	Winter Special [1982]	Winter 1982	48	Articles: "Interview with Jon Pertwee"; "The Doctor Who Archives: The Invasion" (on TV serial); "Doctor Who Conventions"; "The Doctor Who Archives: Frontier in Space" (on TV serial); "Doctor Who Annuals Guide"; "The BBC Radiophonics Workshop"	DWMS
06	SS-06; GN-02	Summer Special [1983] ^{[c]}	Summer 1983	48	Graphic Novel; Short story (original): "Catalogue of Events [I/II/III]" (5D) (This story acted as a framing device to present the two comic strips); Comic strips (reprints of (original black & white): "Junk-Yard Demon" [1–2 of 2] [DWM issues 58–59] (4D); "Abslom Daak...Dalek Killer" [1–4 of 4] [DWM issues 17–20; secondary strip] (Doctorless)	DWMS
07	SS-07	Winter Special 1983/84 ^{[d]}	Winter 1983	48	Articles: "Verity Lambert" (First producer); "John Wiles" (Second producer); "Innes Lloyd" (Third producer); "Peter Bryant" (Producer); "Derrick Sherwin" (Producer); "Barry Letts" (Producer); "Philip Hinchcliffe" (Producer); "Graham Williams" (Producer); "John Nathan-Turner" (Producer); Comic strip (original): "An Unearthly Child: The Unscreened Edition" [1 of 1] (Parody comic strip)	DWMS
08	SS-08	Summer Special [1984]	Summer 1984	48	Articles: "Interview with Chris Crouch" (Doctor Who merchandise); "Doctor Who records; "Doctor Who novels, non-fiction books, foreign books"; "Doctor Who annuals"; "Doctor Who fanzines"; "Doctor Who comics"; "Doctor Who confectionery"	DWMS
09	SS-09	Winter Special [1984]	Winter 1984	48	Articles: "Archives 1: The Aztecs" (1D TV episode); "Archives 2: The Web of Fear" (2D TV episode); "Archives 3: Terror of the Autons" (3D TV episode); "Archives 4: State of Decay" (4D TV episode); "Archives 5: The Visitation" (5D TV episode); "Archives 6: The Twin Dilemma" (6D TV episode); "From Stagehand to Stars: Interview with Director Peter Moffatt"	DWMS
10	SS-10; GN-03	1985 Summer Special Classic ^{[e]}	Summer 1985	52	Graphic Novel; Comic strips (colourised reprints):^{[f]}: "The Iron Legion"^{[f]} [1–8 of 8] [DWM issues 1–8] (4D); "K9's Finest Hour"^{[f]} [1 of 1] [DWM issue 12; secondary strip] (4D Doctor-lite)	DWMS
11	SS-11	Winter Special [1985]	Winter 1985	48	Articles: "The Jon Pertwee Years"; "King of the Tracks: Dudley Simpson" (interview with composer); "Archives: The Claws of Axos" (TV episode); "Monsters and Aliens: Pertwee Era"; "Interview with Katy Manning" (3D companion Jo Grant)	DWMS
12	SS-12	Summer Special 1986	Summer 1986	48	Articles: "Interview: Adrienne Hill" (Companion actor Katarina); "Observing History" (on Hartnell era historical episodes); "The Highlanders" (Lost TV episodes telesnaps); "Interview: Hugh David" (Director); "Target Novels Checklist"; "How to be a Doctor Who villain"; Archives: Marco Polo" (TV episode); "Making History" (Post-Hartnell pseudo-historicals)	DWMS
13	GN-04	Doctor Who Collected Comics ^{[g]}	1986	44	Graphic Novel; Comics strips (colourised reprints): "The Shape Shifter" [1–2 of 2] [DWM issues 88–89] (6D); "Polly the Glot" [1–3 of 3] [DWM issues 95–97] (6D)	DWMS
14	SS-13	Winter Special [1986]	Winter 1986	48	Articles: "The Tom Baker Years"; "Interview: Chris Boucher" (writer); "Archive: The Talons of Weng-Chiang" (TV episode); "The Changing Face of Gallifrey"; "A Tale of Two Time Lords" (interviews with Lynda Bellingham and Michael Jayston); "Fourth Doctor Episode Guide"; "Travelling Companions: Sarah Jane Smith"	DWMS
15	SS-14	Autumn Special [1987]	Autumn 1987	44	Articles: "Designs on Who" (Set design); "K9" (Prop design); "Time and Relative Dimesnsions in Space" (The TARDIS designs); "Title Tattle" (7D title sequence design); "Interview: Julia Smith" (Director); "Dressing the Doctor" (Costume design); "Behind the Scenes" (Ray Cusick's memories of the early days); "Designer Daleks" (Dalek designs); "Special Effects"; "Interview: June Hudson" (Costume design); "Design Checklist" (Design department names for all the TV episodes so far)	DWMS
16	A-01	25th Anniversary Special	November 1988	52	Short story (original): "The Scream of the Silent" (7D); Articles: "William Hartnell Profile"; "Patrick Troughton Profile"; "Jon Pertwee Profile"; "Tom Baker Profile"; "Peter Davison Profile"; "Colin Baker Profile"; "Sylvester McCoy Profile"; "Bestsellers" (Top 10 Doctor Who publications); "Special Effects"; "Comic Strips"; "Merchandise"	DWMS
17	A-02	10th Anniversary Special: 1979–1989	October 1989	52	Articles: "Ten Years of Doctor Who Magazine"; "Interview: Nicholas Courtney" (Actor); "Archive: Black Orchid" (TV episode); "Interview: Colin Baker"; "Roaming Monsters: Sontarans"; "Interview: Tim Coombe" (Director); "The New Daleks" (Latest Dalek designs); "Travelling Companions: K9"	DWMS
18	SS-15	Summer Special [1991]	July 1991	52	Comics strip (original black & white): "Seaside Rendezvous" [1 of 1] (7D); Articles: "Into the Vortex" (On strange locations used in Doctor Who); "Down Your Way" (Location Guide introduction); "Scouting Locations"; "Wales and North West"; "East and Midlands"; "The Doctor Abroad"; "The South East"; "South West"; "London"; "First Call: Silver Nemesis (an interview with Sophie Aldred on the 25th Anniversary story)	DWMS
19	SS-16	Winter Special [1991] ^{[h]}	November 1991	52	Comics strip (original black & white): "The Man in the Ion Mask" [1 of 1] (3D); Brief Encounter – short stories (original): "Listening Watch" (Doctorless); "A Wee Deoch an ...?" (6D); Articles: "An Army of Shadows" (On UNIT); "The UNIT Years" [1] (Troughton and Pertwee Years); "Yates Speaks Out"; "Exposed: The Day of the Daleks" (TV episode); "The UNIT Years" [2] (Tom Baker Years onwards); "UNIT Merchandise"; "Credit Where It's Due" (UNIT episodes cast lists and ratings); "Last Word" (Nicholas Courtney on UNIT years)	DWMS
20	SS-17	Holiday Special [1992]	August 1992	52	Comics strip (original black & white): "City of Devils" [1 of 1] (Doctorless); Brief Encounter – short stories (original): "Girls' Night In"; "Playtime"; "Fond Memories"; Articles: "Roving Reporter" (On Sarah Jane Smith); "Elizabeth Sladen" (Interview); "Sarah's Scrapbook"; "Not on TV" (Sarah's offscreen stories); "Archive: The Hand of Fear" (TV episode); "Archive: K9 and Company: A Girl's Best Friend" (one-off TV pilot episode); "Last Word" (Elizabeth Sladen on her years in the TV show)	DWMS
21	SS-18	Winter Special [1992]	November 1992	52	Comics strip (original black & white): "Flashback" [1 of 1] (7D + 1D); Articles: "Everything your wanted to know about Gallifrey" (on Time Lords); "Archive The Invasion of Time" (TV episode); "Writing Who" (with Terrance Dicks, Anthony Read, and Johnny Byrne – writers); "Archive The Ultimate Foe" (TV episode)	DWMS
22	SS-19	Summer Special [1993]	June 1993	52	Comics strips (original black & white): "Bringer of Darkness" [1 of 1] (2D); Articles: "Everything your wanted to know about Daleks"; "Archive Remembrance of the Daleks" (TV episode); "Writing Who" (with Ben Aaronovitch – writer); "Archive The Chase" (TV episode)	DWMS
23	SS-20; A-03	30th Anniversary 1963–93: Winter Special [1993] ^{[i]}	November 1993	68	Articles: "These are the Seven Doctors"; "The 'Other' Doctors"; "History" (1963–1989); "Companions" (of all the Doctors); "The New Adventures"; "The Comics"; "Canonical?"; "The Monsters"; "The Villains"; Bonus: A set of 20 cards of Doctor Who icons: the Doctors, the TARDIS, companions, monsters and villains.	DWMS
24	SS-21	Summer Special 1994	July 1994	52	Comics strip (original black & white): "Are You Listening?" [1 of 1] (1D); "Younger and Wiser" [1 of 1] (7D); Articles: "The Urge to Live" (on the making of the first season); "Acting the Part" (interview with actor Virginia Wetherell); "Into the Vortex" (Doctor Who early title sequence); "Into the Veil of the Unknown" (interview with William Hartnell); "Archive: 100,000BC" aka An Unearthly Child (TV episodes); "We've Got Work to Do" (on the making of Survival TV episode); "Acting the Part" (interview with actor Lisa Bowerman); "Into the Vortex" (Doctor Who title sequence McCoy era); "Still in Character" (interview with Sylvester McCoy); "Archive: Survival" (TV episode)	DWMS
25	GN-09	The Dalek Chronicles ^{[j]}	August 1994	108	Graphic Novel; Comic strip (reprint of original colourised pages^{[k]} of TV Century 21's Doctorless 104-part one pager comic epic, renamed The Dalek Chronicles with formalised sequence titles^{[l]}): "Genesis of Evil"; "Power Play"; "Duel of the Daleks"; "The Amaryll Challenge"; "The Penta Ray Factor"^{[m]}; "Plague of Death"; "The Menace of the Monstrons"; "Eve of the War"; "The Archives of Phryne"; "Rogue Planet"; "Impasse"; "The Terrorkon Harvest"^{[n]}; "Legacy of Yesteryear"; "Shadow of Humanity"; "The Emissaries of Jevo"; "The Road to Conflict"	DWMS
26	GN-10	The Age of Chaos ^{[o]}	October 1994	92	Graphic Novel; Comic strip (original colour): "The Age of Chaos"^{[p]} [6D]	DWMS
27	SS-22	Winter Special [1994]	December 1994	52	Comics strip (original black & white): "Plastic Millennium" [1 of 1] (7D); Articles: "Highly Improbable..." (On Robert Holmes, writer); "The Missing Stories" (On Robert Holmes, writer); "Archive: The Talons of Weng-Chiang" (TV episode); "Creating the Krotons" (Designer Bobi Bartlett on Holmes 1st adventure); "Holmes on Holmes" (On Robert Holmes, writer); "Beyond Doctor Who" (On Robert Holmes, writer); "Archive: Carnival of Monsters" (TV episode)	DWMS
28	SS-23	Summer Special [1995]	July 1995	52	Comics strip (original black & white): "The Seventh Segment" [1 of 1] (4D); Articles: "The Quest is the Quest" (The Key to Time TV arc); "Tracing the six segments" (The Key to Time TV arc); "Archive: The Ribos Operation " (The Key to Time TV arc episodes); "The Operators" (Actors Iain Cuthburtson and Nigel Plaskitt); "Dough Who?" (Douglas Adams interview); "The Lords of Misrule" (Feature on alternate missing story for Key to Time TV arc); "Archive: The Stones of Blood" (Key to Time TV arc episodes)	DWMS
29	SS-24; M-01	Spring Special: The Sixties Dalek Movies	February 1996	52	Comics strip (original black & white): "Daleks versus the Martians" [1 of 1] (Aaru Doctor (Alt. 1D)); Articles: "Profile: Peter Cushing" (On the alternative 1st Doctor [Aaru Doctor]); "The Company of friends" (Amicus/Aaru Productions); "Dr. Who and the Daleks" (Doctor Who movie); "Daleks – Invasion Earth: 2150 A.D." (Doctor Who movie); "Interview with Jill Curzon" (actor)	DWMS
30	M-02	The Doctor Who Movie Special	May 1996	36	Articles: "Doctor Who: The Story so far..." (An introduction to Doctor Who); "The New Doctor" (on 8D: Paul McGann); "Meet The Master" (on actor Eric Roberts); "The Main Control Room" (New TARDIS look); "Meet Dr Grace" (on actor Daphne Ashbrook); "The Time Travellers Guide to the Galaxy" (on Doctor Who monsters and villains, etc.)	DWMS
Notes: a Arguably, the very first of the Specials can be considered a Graphic Novel with some bonus articles. This is due to the high percentage of the page count given over to comic strips. In addition, the 10th Special issue (which comes out in addition to the two seasonal Specials in 1985) reprints these same two strips again (now colourised – see note below) without the articles, and there is no way that cannot be considered a Graphic Novel.; b "Skywatch-7" was a two part Doctorless comic strip which had its first part published as a secondary strip in DWM (issue 58) and its second part published in the DWM Winter Special 1981, both of which were released around the same time in late 1981.; c No indicia in this publication, and no date on cover. However, Specials status and date confirmed in Doctor Who Magazine: 500 DWM Issues bonus 'Souvenir' publication (free with DWM issue 500) (2016).; d Indicia only mentions Doctor Who Magazine in this publication. However, date is confirmed on the cover alongside the Special designation. Furthermore, Specials status and date confirmed in Doctor Who Magazine: 500 DWM Issues bonus 'Souvenir' publication (free with DWM issue 500) (2016).; e No indicia in this publication, although date and Specials status (albeit modified by 'Classic') are mentioned on cover. Specials status and date are confirmed in Doctor Who Magazine: 500 DWM Issues bonus 'Souvenir' publication (free with DWM issue 500) (2016).; f Here we begin to see the convoluted nature of the reprints. "The Iron Legion" had originally appeared in black and white in DWM issues 1–8; and "K9's Finest Hour" in DWM issue 12 (secondary strip). They were first collected and reprinted in the first edition of the Specials: Doctor Who Magazine Summer Special [1980]. Soon after they were then colourised by Andy Yanchus for Marvel Premiere: Doctor Who, the Marvel USA try-out publication, used to determine if a character or concept could attract enough readers to justify launching their own series. "The Iron Legion" appeared in the first two issues (of the four issue run) in December 1980 (issue 57) and February 1981 (issue 58); "K9's Finest Hour" was a secondary strip in December 1980 (issue 57) (see the section 'Doctor Who Marvel Comics USA [1980–1986]' above for more information). Accordingly, the reprints here in the '1985 Summer Special Classic' are collected reprints of colourised reprints of an original black and white strip that had also been collected in its original black and white in an earlier edition of the same run of Specials! Things will only get more convoluted here on in... with more black and white reprints and digitally re-coloured versions in other subsequent publications.; g Indicia does not indicate this is a Special, reading Doctor Who Magazine Collected Comics. However, Specials status and date confirmed in Doctor Who Magazine: 500 DWM Issues bonus 'Souvenir' publication (free with DWM issue 500) (2016). It is worth noting that in a response to a letter to Doctor Who Classic Comics (issue 4) in 1993, the designation is a 'one-off', as is the title Doctor Who: Voyager (1989). The inference here is that the latter inclusion of publications like Doctor Who Magazine Collected Comics in 'Souvenir' is somewhat arbitrary. However, this is the situation.; h Indicia only mentions Doctor Who Magazine in this publication. However, Special designation date is confirmed on the cover. Furthermore, Specials status and date confirmed in Doctor Who Magazine: 500 DWM Issues bonus 'Souvenir' publication (free with DWM issue 500) (2016).; i The indicia reads: Doctor Who Magazine Winter Special neither mentioning the year nor the status of this publication as '30th Anniversary 1963–93'. The second of these attributes appears on the cover and above the editorial, the second is assumed in the first.; j The indicia calls this: 'The Dalek Chronicles. A Doctor Who Magazine Summer Special', thus seemingly indicating it is a summer Seasonal Special, although one of these had already been released this year (1994) (hence the use of the indefinite article 'A' rather than the definite article 'The'). In an advert in that Doctor Who Magazine Summer Special 1994, however, this publication is simply called a 'Graphic Album'. Whatever its status as a 'Seasonal Special', let alone 'a summer [1994] Seasonal Special', its status as a Specials and date are confirmed in Doctor Who Magazine: 500 DWM Issues bonus 'Souvenir' publication (free with DWM issue 500) (2016).; k This strip was originally presented in colour and on glossy oversized paper (265X355mm).; l Originally, no individual titles were given to the stories. However, some titles were given in the preceding issue's "coming next time" closing caption. After doing research and interviewing those involved in the original strips, John Ainsworth proposed the sequence titles, which were later used by Doctor Who Magazine. Various reprints had occurred of some of the episodes over the years, and DWM began reprinting these strips – in black and white – from issue 33 of Doctor Who Weekly (28 May 1980). This run eventually went to colour, but never completed. It began again in DWM in colour with the first episode of The Dalek Chronicles in issue 180 (27 November 1991) but only ran for a few episodes before transferring to Doctor Who Classic Comics (1992–1994) in its first issue to completion. Accordingly, this The Daleks Chronicles publication could be seen as much as a Doctor Who Classic Comics Special (like the previous year's Doctor Who Classic Comics: Autumn Special printing of Evening Empire [September 1993]), if it weren't for the indicia (see footnote i).; m The second and third episodes of "The Penta Ray Factor" are printed out of order. This is a repeat of the mistake from the Doctor Who Classic Comics (1992–1994) reprints.; n The fifth episode of "The Terrorkon Harvest" has missing text in the opening text box, again a repeat of the mistake from the Doctor Who Classic Comics (1992–1994) reprints.; o The Indicia simply calls this The Age of Chaos. In an advert in Doctor Who Magazine Summer Special 1994 this publication is called a 'Graphic Album'. Nonetheless, its status as a Specials and date are confirmed in Doctor Who Magazine: 500 DWM Issues bonus 'Souvenir' publication (free with DWM issue 500) (2016).; p The first Doctor Who comic story originally produced in full colour by DWM; and the only DWM original, single, novel-length Doctor Who comic strip printed as such.

Doctor Who Magazine Specials ceased publication, along with all the other Marvel parallel publications, with the purchase of Doctor Who Magazine by Panini in 1995. Six years later, Panini kicked off production of 'Specials' once again, this time called 'Special Editions' (2002–present), following very similar formats and mixture of types although issued triannually. Panini would go on to launch another set of triannual 'Specials', known as 'Bookazines', a decade or so after that (2013–present).

With respect to Specials devoted to comic strips and labelled as 'Graphic Novels' in the list above, there were six issued in total. Along with the three Marvel era 'Graphic Novels' (1989–1993) and the DWM Classic Comics Autumn Special: Evening's Empire (1993) publication (which appears as a Special of the 'Classic Comics' run) there were ten Marvel era DWM 'Graphic Novels' overall. These are all listed together for ease in the 'Doctor Who Magazine Graphic Novels (1989–1993)' subsection below, with the publications belonging to the different 'Specials' and 'Classic Comics' indicated in the table.

=== Doctor Who Graphic Novels (1980–1994) ===
There were ten publications during the Marvel era that can be considered 'Graphic Novels'. These were six of the 30 Doctor Who Magazine 'Specials' (1980–1996), Evening's Empire (1993) which appeared as a 'Special' of the 'Classic Comics' run (1992–1994), and three one-off publications. The term 'Graphic Novel' must be applied loosely here overall, as all but two these publications collect and reprint several comic stories from DWM, although in most cases the stories are related. Furthermore, the two issues that print original stories in full or part are The Age of Chaos (1994) in the 'Specials' run; and the aforementioned Classic Comics Autumn Special: Evening's Empire (1993), which printed a strip begun but never completed in Doctor Who Magazine. Accordingly, the three one-off 'Graphic Novels' are all reprints from DWM, although two of these colourise original black and white strips:

- Doctor Who: Voyager (1989): Collects and reprints four Sixth Doctor stories from the DWM main comic strip, including the two stories already reprinted in Doctor Who Collected Comics (DWM 'Specials') three years previous. These appeared in the order of original publication, and all four strips were colourised for the first time.
- Abslom Daak Dalek Killer (1990): Abslom Daak was a character who first appeared in a DWM secondary strip in the early years of the publication, when still Doctor Who Weekly (1980). The character returned a couple of times in two related secondary strips later that year, before appearing in the main strip alongside the Seventh Doctor after almost a decade (1989). This volume collects all these stories, as well as having an original short story linking the early three secondary strips with the later main strip appearance. The strips appear here, as they did in their original publication, in black and white.
- Doctor Who: The Mark of Mandragora (1993): A Virgin Publishing experiment, who were at the time printing the Virgin New Adventures Doctor Who novels (1991–1997) starring the Seventh Doctor. Virgin licensed some Seventh Doctor main comic strips from DWM and published them in a graphic novel entitled Doctor Who: Mark of Mandragora, reprinting stories that originally appeared between 1990 and 1991, as well as the text story "Teenage Kicks" by Paul Cornell (1990). The strips were colourised.

The list below displays all ten 'Graphic Novels', although only the contents of the three stand-alone publications are given here. The seven other publications refer back to the content lists of the sub-sections for Doctor Who Magazine 'Specials' (1980–1996) and Doctor Who Classic Comics (Marvel) (1992–1994). This method has been chosen to both give a full overview of the ten DWM 'Graphic Novels' in this section, but also so as to differentiate with those that are part of other series. Numbering has been provided to give some order to these publications (and is reflected in the 'Specials' and Classic Comics sections), but is not official and does not indicate any 'series' designation.

List of Doctor Who Graphic Novels

MGN#	Series	Title	Date	Pages	Contents	References
GN-01	Specials [issue 01]	Summer Special [1980]	Summer 1980	52	See 'Doctor Who Magazine Specials (1980–1996)' sub-section above.	DWMS
GN-02	Specials [issue 06]	Summer Special [1983]	Summer 1983	48	See 'Doctor Who Magazine Specials (1980–1996)' sub-section above.	DWMS
GN-03	Specials [issue 10]	1985 Summer Special Classic	Summer 1985	52	See 'Doctor Who Magazine Specials (1980–1996)' sub-section above.	DWMS
GN-04	Specials [issue 13]	Doctor Who Collected Comics	1986	44	See 'Doctor Who Magazine Specials (1980–1996)' sub-section above.	DWMS
GN-05	One-off Graphic Novel #1	Doctor Who: Voyager ^{[a]}	May 1989	104	Comics strips (colourised reprints): "The Shape Shifter" [6D] [issues 88–89; May–June 1984]; "Voyager" [6D] [issues 90–94; July–November 1984]; "Polly the Glot" [6D] [issues 95–97; December 1984 – February 1985]; "Once Upon a Time Lord" [6D] [issues 98–99; March–April 1985]	DWMGN
GN-06	One-off Graphic Novel #2	Abslom Daak Dalek Killer ^{[b]}	April 1990	100	Comics strips (reprints in original black and white): "Abslom Daak… Dalek Killer" [Doctorless secondary strip] [issues 17–20; 6–27 February 1980]; "Star Tigers" [I&II] [Doctorless secondary strips] [issues 27–30 / 44–46; 16 April-7 May 1980 / September–November 1980]; "Nemesis of the Daleks" [7D] [issues 152–155; September–December 1989]; Short story (original): "Between the Wars: A Slow Night in Paradise" (fills narrative gap between "Star Tigers" and "Nemesis of the Daleks")	DWMGN
GN-07	One-off Graphic Novel #3	Doctor Who: The Mark of Mandragora ^{[c]}	April 1993	94	Comic strips (colourised reprints): "Train-Flight" [7D] [issues 159–161; April–June 1990]; "Doctor Conkerer!" [7D] [issue 162; July 1990]; "Fellow Travellers" [7D] [issues 164–166; 8 September-31 October 1990]; "Darkness, Falling" ("The Mark of Mandragora" prequel I) [Doctorless main strip] [issue 167; 28 November 1990]; "Distractions" ("The Mark of Mandragora" prequel II) [7D] [issue 168; 26 December 1990]; "The Mark of Mandragora" [7D] [issues 169–172; 23 January-17 April 1991]; Short story (reprint): "Teenage Kicks" [7D] [issue 163; August 1990] (printed between "Fellow Travellers" and "Darkness, Falling")	DWMGN
GN-08	Doctor Who Classic Comics [Autumn Special]	Evening's Empire	September 1993	52	See 'Doctor Who Classic Comics (Marvel) (1992–1994)' sub-section below.	DWCCS
GN-09	Specials [issue 25]	The Dalek Chronicles	August 1994	108	See 'Doctor Who Magazine Specials (1980–1996)' sub-section above.	DWMS
GN-10	Specials [issue 28]	The Age of Chaos	October 1994	92	See 'Doctor Who Magazine Specials (1980–1996)' sub-section above.	DWMS
Notes: a Doctor Who: Voyager is named a 'Graphic Novel' both on its cover and in its indicia. It is worth noting that in a response to a letter to Doctor Who Classic Comics (issue 4) in 1993, the designation is a 'one-off', as is the title Doctor Who Collected Comics (GN-04, directly above). Specials status and date for the latter publication is confirmed in Doctor Who Magazine: 500 DWM Issues bonus 'Souvenir' publication (free with DWM issue 500) (2016). The inference here is that the inclusion of publications like Doctor Who Magazine Collected Comics in 'Souvenir' is somewhat arbitrary. However, this is the situation, and Doctor Who: Voyager does not appear in the Specials list. Indeed, as Doctor Who comic strip historian John Ainsworth notes Doctor Who: Voyager is considered the first proper 'Graphic Novel' by DWM and Marvel.; b Abslom Daak Dalek Killer, although only having its title on the cover and in the indicia with no format mentioned, is designated a 'Graphic Album' in advertising. See, for instance, the advert in the Doctor Who Magazine Summer Special [1991].; c Doctor Who: The Mark of Mandragora is named a 'Graphic Novel' on its cover but not in its indicia, where the Virgin licensing mentions only Marvel and not Doctor Who Magazine. Neither is DWM mentioned on the credits page, however, the back cover blurb does indeed cite the source material.

After Marvel sold Doctor Who Magazine to Panini in 1995, the different formats of Graphic Novels would become much more harmonized with the introduction of the 'Doctor Who Comic Strip Collected Editions (2004–present)'. These would reprint DWM main strips and strips from parallel publications in large A4 editions. The ethos of the 'Collected Editions' was and is to print the stories in their original order and format, in other words, reprinting strips originally produced in black and white as black and white. Accordingly, the Marvel era publications with reprinted but colourised strips generally remains the only way to see these stories in Graphic Novel format. There are exceptions, however. Colourised reprints of the early DWM black and white strips which had been published in Doctor Who Marvel Comics USA (1980–1986) would appear in Doctor Who Classic Comics (1992–1994), around the same time as the Marvel Graphic Novels. Then, in January 2008 under a Panini licence, IDW Publishing, an American comic book company, would launch Doctor Who Classics, a monthly comic book series reprinting digitally colourised Fourth, Fifth, Sixth and Seventh Doctor strips (2008–2014). The series would go on to be collected in various trade paperbacks, and then some in omnibus editions – both of which can be considered 'Graphic Novels'. However, these are recoloured digitally while the Marvel era were hand-coloured, so the Marvel Graphic Novels retain a certain uniqueness. From later years of DWM when the strip was colourised (beginning issue 300 in 2001), there were also two Panini era 'Special Editions' (2002–present) that reprinted comic strips for the Ninth Doctor (April 2006) and some of the mid-period Tenth Doctor (April 2008), although these strips went on to also be collected in the 'Collected Editions'.

=== DWM related Doctor Who strips (1989–1993) ===
During the late 1980s Marvel UK Comics decided to expand its ranges, and created a number of 'experimental' comics. Two of these titles launched toward the end of 1989, both of which were edited by Andy Seddon, featured Doctor Who content. The Incredible Hulk Presents had an original dedicated stand-alone Doctor Who comic strip which ran every issue, alongside reprints of other Marvel USA comic strips. The Death's Head situation was far more complex as it was constituted as crossover stories. The already established character of Death's Head featured in a main strip of Doctor Who Magazine, before going on to have its own comic Deaths Head launched where the Doctor went on to appear in one of the stories. Subsequently, Death's Head would return to have another guest appearance in the Doctor Who Magazine main strip. Both publications suffered poor sales, and were soon cancelled. However, in 1993, all the Death's Head stories, plus those from DWM featuring Death's Head now specially colourised, were reissued in the pre-planned limited run The Incomplete Death's Head series. The content also included a non-Death's Head Doctor Who Magazine story (again specially colourised), as well as a newly created coda starring the Doctor in the final pages of the final issue.

==== The Incredible Hulk Presents (1989) ====
The Incredible Hulk Presents was a short-lived weekly comic from Marvel UK. It launched in September 1989 with issue 1, and lasted twelve issues in total. It reprinted stories from US Marvel Comics' The Incredible Hulk from the 1970s; G.I. Joe: Special Missions (retitled for the UK as Action Force, later G.I. Joe the Action Force); and an Indiana Jones strip reprinting Marvel US adaptations of Indiana Jones and the Last Crusade and further Indiana Jones adventures. All the reprinted US strips were in colour. The only original content was the Doctor Who strip, which was, however, produced in black and white. This strip featured ten adventures (with two two-parters) of the Seventh Doctor.

The 'intention (unbeknownst to the editor of Doctor Who Magazine) [was] that the strips would also run in DWM. When he found out, John Freeman took issue with the plan, arguing that while the strips had merit for the intended younger audience IHP was aimed at, they were inappropriate for DWM, which was trying to tailor more for Doctor Who fans, instead of the mainstream audience previous editors had aimed for'. Freeman's argument was eventually accepted by Marvel UK as sales figures of DWM improved under his leadership; albeit with two exceptions. The two part strip "Hunger at the Ends of Time!" from issues 2 and 3 of IHP was reprinted in DWM issues 157 and 158 (February – March, 1990); and the one unpublished strip completed for IHP issue 13 before the publication was cancelled, "Doctor Conkerer!", which appeared in DWM issue 162 (July 1990).

List of The Incredible Hulk Presents Doctor Who strips

#	Comic Title	Date	Doctor Who strip	References
01	The Incredible Hulk Presents	7 October 1989	"Once in a Lifetime"	IHP
02	The Incredible Hulk Presents	14 October 1989	"Hunger at the Ends of Time!" Part 1	IHP
03	The Incredible Hulk Presents	21 October 1989	"Hunger at the Ends of Time!" Part 2	IHP
04	The Incredible Hulk Presents	28 October 1989	"War World"	IHP
05	The Incredible Hulk Presents	4 November 1989	"Technical Hitch"	IHP
06	The Incredible Hulk Presents	11 November 1989	"A Switch in Time"	IHP
07	The Incredible Hulk Presents	18 November 1989	"The Sentinel!"	IHP
08	The Incredible Hulk Presents	25 November 1989	"Who's That Girl!" Part 1	IHP
09	The Incredible Hulk Presents	2 December 1989	"Who's That Girl!" Part 2	IHP
10	The Incredible Hulk Presents	9 December 1989	"The Enlightenment of Ly-Chee the Wise"	IHP
11	The Incredible Hulk Presents	16 December 1989	"Slimmer"	IHP
12	The Incredible Hulk Presents	23 December 1989	"Ninevah!"	IHP

Andy Seddon, editor of IHP, says that the comic folded quite quickly as 'a result of poor sales. I think everyone involved at the editorial level didn't think it was a coherent offering'. As well as the reprint and re-purposing of the two strips mentioned above, four of the strips were soon reprinted in Doctor Who Classic Comics (1992–1994) – beginning with issue 21 (June 1992) – now specially colourised (see below). Eventually, all the strips (including the re-purposed IHP issue 13 strip printed in DWM 162) were reissued in original black and white in the Collected Edition Doctor Who: Nemesis of the Daleks (2013).

==== Death's Head & Incomplete Death's Head (1989–1993) ====
The character of Death's Head was a giant robotic bounty hunter created by writer Simon Furman and artist Geoff Senior for the Marvel UK's The Transformers comic. The character's first association with Doctor Who happened in the April 1998 edition of Doctor Who Magazine (issue 135) in the Seventh Doctor main strip "The Crossroads of Time". In this story the Doctor and Death's Head clash, the former reducing the latter from a giant robot to human size with the Master's Tissue Compression Eliminator before sending him to Earth.

Death's Head then made a guest appearance in Marvel UK's Dragon's Claws issue 5 (November 1988) in a strip titled "Watch Out Dragon's Claws – Here's Death's Head". After these guest appearances, Marvel Comics UK launched the full colour USA size-format Death's Head in December 1988. The publication was issued monthly, with each edition featuring one long comic strip story starring Death's Head. During the Death's Head comic run, the Seventh Doctor appears as a central antagonist. In issue 8 (July 1989), the story "Time Bomb!" (not to be confused with a DWM Sixth Doctor story of the same name) sees the Doctor with a bounty on his head. Death's Head picks up the contract from an adversary to the Doctor, uber-capitalist Josiah W. Dogbolter.

In May 1991, Death's Head featured in a cameo role in the Doctor Who Magazine main strip in a story called "Party Animals" (issue 173). In the story, the Seventh Doctor attends a party populated by a number of his foes, and witnesses a bar fight explode, in which Death's Head plays a contributing factor.

The Death's Head publication was cancelled at issue 10 (September 1989), but the character was rebooted as Death's Head II for inclusion in Marvel UK's next wave of titles. Commissioned by the new editor Paul Neary, Death's Head II replaced the original character with a new version created by Dan Abnett, Andy Lanning, and Liam Sharp. Death's Head II launched with issue 1 in March 1992, and ran for four monthly issues. Death's Head II was an immediate success, which meant Neary was ordered to create more titles. The simplest way to do this quickly was to reprint the original Death's Head comic series. The job was given to editor John Freeman. The series – which ran for twelve issues – was called The Incomplete Death's Head (January – December 1993). However, it did not only repeat the original series, but also included a number of other Death's Head strips from Marvel publications; the twelve issues of The Incomplete Death's Head included everything else from "High Noon Tex" through to the Marvel Comics Presents story "The Deadliest Game", as well as beginning (issue 1) and ending (issue 12) with three colourised Doctor Who Magazine strips "The Crossroads of Time", "Time Bomb!" and "Party Animals". The publication also incorporated a non-Death's Head story early-run (issues 4 and 5), the Doctor Who Magazine comic strip "Keepsake" (DWM 140; September 1988) once again starring the Seventh Doctor, and once again colourised. The final few pages of the final issue – as an untitled coda – have a fourth encounter with the Doctor, specially produced for the publication.

List of Doctor Who and Death's Head crossovers

#	Publication	Issue	Date	Story	Production	Notes
01	Doctor Who Magazine	135	Apr 1998	"The Crossroads of Time"	Black and white	Original
02	Death's Head	8	Jul 1989	"Time Bomb!"^{[a]}	Colour	Original
03	Doctor Who Magazine	173	May 1991	"Party Animals"	Black and white	Original
04	The Incomplete Death's Head	1	Jan 1993	"The Crossroads of Time"	Colour	Reprint – Colourised – of #01
05	The Incomplete Death's Head	4	Apr 1993	"Keepsake" (part 1)	Colour	Reprint – Colourised – of DWM mainstrip issue 140 (Sep 1988)^{[b]}
06	The Incomplete Death's Head	5	May 1993	"Keepsake" (part 2)	Colour	Reprint – Colourised – of DWM mainstrip issue 140 (Sep 1988)^{[b]}
07	The Incomplete Death's Head	9	Sep 1993	"Time Bomb!"^{[a]}	Colour	Reprint of #02
08	The Incomplete Death's Head	12	Dec 1993	"Party Animals"	Colour	Reprint – Colourised – of #03
09	The Incomplete Death's Head	12	Dec 1993	Untitled coda	Colour	Original
Notes: a "Time Bomb!" is not to be confused with a Doctor Who Magazine Sixth Doctor story of approximately the same name: "Time Bomb" (DWM issues 114–116; July – September 1986); b Death's Head does not feature in-strip in "Keepsake", but the story is incorporated due to the narrative wraparound used throughout the Incomplete Death's Head series.

=== Doctor Who Classic Comics (1992–1994) ===
Between 1992 and 1994, Marvel UK published Doctor Who Classic Comics. The aim was, as editor Gary Russell stated in the Editorial of the first issue, 'to reproduce every one of the Doctor Who strips produced in Britain'. In the end, the publication only ran for 27 monthly issues, with an additional mid-run 'Autumn Special' in 1993. Over the 27 issues, the publication reprinted strips predominately from the early Polystyle Doctor Who comic strip and the early TV Century 21 Dalek comic strip, but also from a number of sources including, later in the run, DWM itself. As well as reprints, the 'Autumn Special' featured the comic strip "Evening's Empire", an unfinished story from DWM issue 180, here completed for the first time. "Evening's Empire", accordingly, can be seen as a 'Graphic Novel' and essentially as the only original strip of the publication. The sources were:

- Polystyle comic strip (1964–1979): reprinting selected stories from the First, Second, Third, and Fourth Doctors originally printed in TV Comic (#674–999 [1964–1971]); Countdown (#1–39 [1971]); Countdown for TV Action (#40–56 [1971–1972]); TV Action in Countdown (#57–58 [1972]); TV Action + Countdown (#59–100 [1972–1973]); TV Action (#101–131 [1973]); TV Comic + TV Action (#1133–1147 [1973]); TV Comic (#1148–1181 [1973–1974]); TV Comic plus Tom & Jerry Weekly (#1182–1201 [1974]); TV Comic (#1202–1291 [1974–1976]); Mighty TV Comic (#1292–1352 [1976–1977]); TV Comic (#1353–1392 [1977–1978]); TV Comic with Target (#1393–1401 [1978]); and TV Comic (#1402–1430 [1978–1979]); as well as one strip from an associated annual: TV Comic Annual 1976 (1975). Some of these stories were originally in colour; some in part colour (for example one page was colour, the rest of the pages black and white); or in black and white. For DWCC all original black and white pages were colourised.
- TV Century 21 comic strip (1965–1967): reprinting Dalek stories which had been 'a huge success' in DWCC's 'sister publication, Doctor Who Magazine' and were 'transferred... to give... more space to re-present them'. The strip was presented in its original colour format, and ran from issue 1 almost every week, completing in issue 19 (April 1994).
- Dell Movie Classics comic strip (December 1966): a one-off American publication (in the Dell Movie Classic series) featuring a story called Dr. Who and the Daleks with the Aaru Doctor (alternative First Doctor played by Peter Cushing). This was an adaptation of the Dr. Who and the Daleks film from 1965, in turn adapted from the Doctor Who television serial "The Daleks" from 1963 to 1964. The reprint appeared in its entirety in DWCC issue 9. Printed in original colour.
- Doctor Who Magazine comic strip (1979–1991): DWCC reprinted mostly main strips from the Fourth, Fifth, Sixth, and Seventh Doctors; as well as completing the Seventh Doctor story "Evening's Empire" in the mid-run 'Autumn Special' (September 1993). The DWM main strip reprints began in DWCC issue 9 (July 1993) with a Fourth Doctor story. DWCC also reprinted some DWM secondary strips (essentially Doctorless), beginning in issue 23. All were originally in black and white (barring two pages of the Fifth Doctor story 'The Tides of Time' – DWM issue 66), and were specially colourised for DWCC (even when some had previously been colourised for reprints in Doctor Who Comics USA [1980–1986]).
- The Incredible Hulk Presents comic strip (1989): a short run of a parallel Seventh Doctor strip in the short-lived The Incredible Hulk Presents comic. It launched in September 1989 with issue 1, and lasted twelve issues in total. It reprinted stories from US Marvel Comics' The Incredible Hulk from the 1970s; G.I. Joe: Special Missions (retitled for the UK as Action Force, later G.I. Joe the Action Force); and an Indiana Jones strip reprinting Marvel US adaptations of Indiana Jones and the Last Crusade and further Indiana Jones adventures. All these US strips were in colour. The Doctor Who strip, however, was in black and white. One story was later printed in DWM, Hunger from the Ends of Time!; and one unpublished strip, Doctor Conkerer!, was produced for the unprinted issue #13 later being printed in DWM 162. DWCC reprinted only four of the early stories, over three issues beginning in issue 21. All four one-part strips were colourised.

The comic strips in Doctor Who Classic Comics were presented in full colour, meaning strips were colourised when not originally released in colour.

List of Doctor Who Classic Comics

#	Title	Date	Pages	Contents	References
CC-01	Doctor Who Classic Comics Issue 1	9 December 1992	52	Polystyle comic strips: "Gemini Plan" [Countdown issues 1–5]^{[a]} (3D) (reprinted in original colour); "Timebenders" [Countdown issues 6–13] (3D) (reprinted in original colour); "The Vogan Slaves" Part 1 [Countdown issues 15–18]^{[b]} (3D) (reprinted in original colour); TV Century 21 comic strips: "The Daleks: The Amaryll Challenge" Parts 1–4 [TVC21 issues 18–21]^{[c]} (Doctorless) (reprinted in original colour); Articles: "Frame Count" (Hartnell comic strips overview); "Behind the Frame" (On Polystyles' 1960s comic strips); Bonus: Giant Poster of Third Doctor	DWCC
CC-02	Doctor Who Classic Comics Issue 2	6 January 1993	52	Polystyle comic strips: "The Vogan Slaves" Part 2 [Countdown issues 19–22] (3D) (reprinted in original colour); "The Klepton Parasites"^{[d]} [TV Comic issues 674–683] (1D) (colourised reprint); TV Century 21 comic strips: "The Daleks: The Amaryll Challenge" Parts 5–7 [TVC21 issues 22–24] (Doctorless) (reprinted in original colour); "The Daleks: The Penta Ray Factor" Parts 1–4^{[e]} [TVC21 issues 25–28] (Doctorless) (reprinted in original colour); Articles: "Frame Count" (Troughton comic strips overview); "Behind the Frame" (On Polystyles' 1970–1972 comic strips); Bonus: Giant Poster of Third Doctor	DWCC
CC-03	Doctor Who Classic Comics Issue 3	3 February 1993	52	Polystyle comic strips: "The Celluloid Midas" [Countdown issues 23–32] (3D) (reprinted in original colour); "Backtime" Part 1 [Countdown issues 33–34] (3D) (reprinted in original colour)^{[f]}; "The Extortioner"^{[g]} [TV Comic issues 784–787] (2D) (colourised reprint); TV Century 21 comic strips: "The Daleks: The Penta Ray Factor" Parts 5–8 [TVC21 issues 29–32] (Doctorless) (reprinted in original colour); "The Daleks: Plague of Death" Parts 1 & 2 [TVC21 issues 33–34] (Doctorless) (reprinted in original colour); Articles: "Frame Count" (Pertwee comic strips overview part 1); "Behind the Frame" (On Polystyles' 1972–1975 comic strips); Bonus: Giant Poster of Sontaran	DWCC
CC-04	Doctor Who Classic Comics Issue 4	3 March 1993	52	Polystyle comic strips: "Backtime" Part 2 [Countdown issues 35–39] (3D) (colourised reprint)^{[f]}; "The Eternal Present" Part 1 [Countdown for TV Action issues 40–44] (3D) (reprinted in original colour); "The Arkwood Experiment"^{[h]} [TV Comic issues 944–949] (3D) (colourised reprint); TV Century 21 comic strips: "The Daleks: Plague of Death" Parts 3–7 [TVC21 issues 35–39] (Doctorless) (reprinted in original colour); "The Daleks: Menace of the Monstrons" Part 1 [TVC21 issue 40] (Doctorless) (reprinted in original colour); Articles: "Frame Count" (Pertwee comic strips overview part 2); "Behind the Frame" (On Polystyles' 1975–1976 comic strips); Bonus: Giant Poster of Zygon	DWCC
CC-05	Doctor Who Classic Comics Issue 5	31 March 1993	52	Polystyle comic strips: "The Eternal Present" Part 2 [Countdown for TV Action issues 45–46] (3D) (reprinted in original colour); "*Sub Zero" [Countdown for TV Action issues 47–54] (3D) (reprinted in original colour); "Death Flower!"^{[i]} Part 1 [TV Comic issues 1204–1209] (4D) (colourised reprint); TV Century 21 comic strips: "The Daleks: Menace of the Monstrons" Part 2 [TVC21 issues 41–46] (Doctorless) (reprinted in original colour); Articles: "Jon Pertwee: The Comics in Comics!" (interview with Pertwee on his comics presence); "Frame Count" (Tom Baker comic strips overview part 1); "Behind the Frame" (On Polystyles' 1976–1979 comic strips); Bonus: Giant Poster of Ice Warriors	DWCC
CC-06	Doctor Who Classic Comics Issue 6	28 April 1993	52	Polystyle comic strips: "The Planet of the Daleks" [Countdown for TV Action issues 55–56 / TV Action in Countdown issues 57–58 / TV Action + Countdown issues 59–62] (3D) (55–58: reprinted in original colour; 69-62 each episode page 1 of 3 reprinted in original colour and pages 2–3 colourised reprints); "Death Flower!" Part 2 [TV Comic issues 1210–1214] (4D) (colourised reprint); TV Century 21 comic strips: "The Daleks: The Eve of the War" [TVC21 issues 47–51] (Doctorless) (reprinted in original colour); "The Daleks: The Archives of Phryne" [TVC21 issues 52–58] (Doctorless) (reprinted in original colour); Articles: "Frame Count" (Tom Baker comic strips overview part 2); "Behind the Frame" (Doctor Who Weekly/Doctor Who A Marvel Monthly comic strips: 1979–1982); Bonus: Giant Poster of the Terileptil	DWCC
CC-07	Doctor Who Classic Comics Issue 7	26 May 1993	52	Polystyle comic strips: "A Stitch in Time" [TV Action + Countdown issues 63–70] (3D) (each episode: page 1 of 3 reprinted in original colour and pages 2–3 colourised reprints); The Ordeals of Demeter [TV Comic issues 720–723] (1D) (reprinted in original colour); Enter: The Go-Ray [TV Comic issues 724–727] (1D) (reprinted in original colour); Articles: "Frame Count" (Davison and Colin Baker comic strips overview); "Behind the Frame" (Doctor Who Monthly/The Official Doctor Who Magazine comic strips: 1982–1984); Bonus: Giant Poster of the Yeti	DWCC
CC-08	Doctor Who Classic Comics Issue 8	23 June 1993	52	Polystyle comic strips: "The Trodos Tyranny" [TV Comic issues 748–752] (1D) (reprinted in original colour); "Return of the Trods" [TV Comic issues 772–775] (1D) (colourised reprint); "The Trodos Ambush" [TV Comic issues 788–791] (2D) (each episode: page 1 of 3 reprinted in original colour and pages 2–3 colourised reprints); TV Century 21 comic strips: "The Daleks: The Rogue Planet" [TVC21 issues 59–62] (Doctorless) (reprinted in original colour); Articles: "The Daleks" (On the TVC21 Dalek comic strips); "Frame Count" (TVC21 Dalek comic strips overview); "Frame Count" (McCoy comic strips overview); "Behind the Frame" (The Official Doctor Who Magazine/The Doctor Who Magazine/Doctor Who Magazine comic strips: 1984–1987); "The Trods" (on the TV Comic comic strip foes the Trods); Bonus: Giant Poster of Silurian	DWCC
CC-09	Doctor Who Classic Comics Issue 9	21 July 1993	52	Dell comic strip: "Dr. Who and the Daleks" [Dell Comics number 12-190-612 of Dell Movie Classics] (alt. 1D)^{[j]} (reprinted in original colour); Doctor Who Magazine comic strip: "The Neutron Knights"^{[k]} [Doctor Who A Marvel Monthly issue 60] (4D) (colourised reprint); Articles: "Behind the Frame" (Doctor Who Magazine and Death's Head crossover comic strips: 1987–1989); Bonus: Giant Poster of Ogron	DWCC
CC-10	Doctor Who Classic Comics Issue 10	18 August 1993	52	Doctor Who Magazine comic strip: "The Tides of Time"^{[l]} Part 1 [Doctor Who Monthly issues 61–64] (5D) (colourised reprint); Polystyle comic strips: "Shark Bait" [aka "The Frog People"]^{[m]} [TV Comic issues 728–731] (1D) (reprinted in original colour); Articles: "Behind the Frame" (Doctor Who Magazine and The Incredible Hulk Presents parallel comic strips: 1989–1993 [then current day]); Bonus: Giant Poster of artwork for cover of DWCC "The Tides of Time"	DWCC
CC-11	Doctor Who Classic Comics Issue 11	15 September 1993	52	Doctor Who Magazine comic strip: "The Tides of Time" Part 2 [Doctor Who Monthly issues 65–68] (5D) (colourised reprint [except two pages in issue 66^{[n]}]); Polystyle comic strips: "The Doctor Strikes Back" [TV Comic issues 792–795] (2D) (each episode: page 1 of 3 reprinted in original colour and pages 2–3 colourised reprints); Articles: "Stripped Assets" (Interviews with comic strip creators: Dave Gibbons); "Vworp Vworp" (Chronology of Doctor Who comic strips); Bonus: Giant Poster of the Kraals	DWCC
CC-12 / GN-08	Doctor Who Classic Comics: Autumn Special^{[o]}	September 1993	52	Doctor Who Magazine / Original DWCC comic strip: "Evening's Empire" [Pages 7–13: Doctor Who Monthly issue 180; pages 3–6 and 8–50 original] (7D) (revised and colourised reprint – pages 7–13; pages 3–6 and 8–50 original colour)^{[p]}; Bonus: Giant Poster of artwork for cover of DWCC 'Autumn Special "Evening's Empire"	DWCCS
CC-13	Doctor Who Classic Comics Issue 12	13 October 1993	52	Polystyle comic strips: "The Enemy from Nowhere" [TV Action + Countdown issues 71–78] (3D) (each episode: page 1 of 3 reprinted in original colour and pages 2–3 colourised reprints); "The Therovian Quest" [TV Comic issues 684–689] (1D) (colourised reprint); TV Century 21 comic strips: "The Daleks: Impasse" [TVC21 issues 63–69] (Doctorless) (reprinted in original colour); Articles: "Vworp Vworp" (Chronology of Doctor Who comic strips); Bonus: Giant Poster of the Androids of Tara	DWCC
CC-14	Doctor Who Classic Comics Issue 13^{[q]}	10 November 1993	52	Polystyle comic strips: "The Ugrakks" Part 1 [TV Action + Countdown issues 79–84] (3D) (each episode: page 1 of 3 reprinted in original colour and pages 2–3 colourised reprints); "The Hijackers of Thrax" [TV Comic issues 690–692] (1D) (colourised reprint); "On the Web Planet" [TV Comic issues 693–698] (1D) (colourised reprint); Articles: "Vworp Vworp" (Chronology of Doctor Who comic strips); Bonus: Giant Poster of giant Krynoid and Classic Comics badge (taped to front of comic)	DWCC
CC-15	Doctor Who Classic Comics Issue 14	8 December 1993	52	Doctor Who Magazine comic strip: "Planet of the Dead" [Doctor Who Magazine issues 141–142] (7D) (colourised reprint); Polystyle comic strips: "The Ugrakks" Part 2 [TV Action + Countdown issues 85–89] (3D) (each episode: page 1 of 3 reprinted in original colour and pages 2–3 colourised reprints); "Woden's Warriors" [TV Comic Annual 1976] (4D) (reprinted in original colour); TV Century 21 comic strips: "The Daleks: The Terrorkon Harvest"^{[r]} [TVC21 issues 70–75] (Doctorless) (reprinted in original colour); Articles: "Vworp Vworp" (Chronology of Doctor Who comic strips); Bonus: Giant Poster of the seven Doctors (painting)	DWCC
CC-16	Doctor Who Classic Comics Issue 15	15 January 1994	52	Polystyle comic strips: "A Christmas Story" [TV Comic issues 732–735] (1D) (reprinted in original colour); "Steelfist" [TV Action + Countdown issues 89–93] (3D) (each episode: page 1 of 3 reprinted in original colour and pages 2–3 colourised reprints); "Zeron Invasion" Part 1 [TV Action + Countdown issue 94–97] (3D) (each episode: page 1 of 3 reprinted in original colour and pages 2–3 colourised reprints); TV Century 21 comic strips: "The Daleks: Legacy of Yesteryear" Part 1 [TVC21 issues 76–80] (Doctorless) (reprinted in original colour); Articles: "The Telesnap Archive: Introduction" (Short overview of BBC junking policy and the existence of telesnaps); "The Telesnap Archive: Fury from the Deep" Episode One – Lost TV episodes^{[s]}; "Vworp Vworp" (Chronology of Doctor Who comic strips); Bonus: Giant Poster of the Mummy	DWCC
CC-17	Doctor Who Classic Comics Issue 16	2 February 1994	52	Doctor Who Magazine comic strip: "Exodus"/"Revelation"/"Genesis" [Doctor Who Magazine issues 108–110] (6D) (colourised reprint); Polystyle comic strips: "Zeron Invasion" Part 2 [TV Action + Countdown issues 98–100] (3D) (each episode: page 1 of 3 reprinted in original colour and pages 2–3 colourised reprints); TV Century 21 comic strips: "The Daleks: Legacy of Yesteryear" Part 2 [TVC21 issues 81–85] (Doctorless) (reprinted in original colour); Articles: "Stripped Assets" (Interviews with comic strip creators: John Ridgway); "The Telesnap Archive: Fury from the Deep" Episode Three – Lost TV episodes^{[s]}; "Vworp Vworp" (Chronology of Doctor Who comic strips); Bonus: Giant Poster of Sensorites	DWCC
CC-18	Doctor Who Classic Comics Issue 17	2 March 1994	52	Polystyle comic strips: "Return of the Daleks" ["TV Comic" issues 1215–1222] (4D) (colourised reprint); "The Zombies" ["TV Comic" issues 796–798] (2D) (each episode: page 1 of 3 reprinted in original colour and pages 2–3 colourised reprints); "The Gyros Injustice" ["TV Comic" issue 699–704] (1D); TV Century 21 comic strips: "The Daleks: Shadow of Humanity" [TVC21 issues 86–89] (Doctorless) (reprinted in original colour); Articles: "The Telesnap Archive: Fury from the Deep" Episode Five – Lost TV episodes^{[s]}; "Vworp Vworp" (Chronology of Doctor Who comic strips); Bonus: Giant Poster of Vervoid	DWCC
CC-19	Doctor Who Classic Comics Issue 18	30 March 1994	52	Doctor Who Magazine comic strip: "Stars Fell on Stockbridge" [Doctor Who Magazine issues 68–69] (5D) (colourised reprint); Polystyle comic strips: "Deadly Choice" [TV Action issues 101–103] (3D) (reprinted in original colour); "Master of Spiders" [TV Comic issues 799–802] (2D) (each episode: page 1 of 3 reprinted in original colour and pages 2–3 colourised reprints); TV Century 21 comic strips: "The Daleks: The Emissaries of Jevo" [TVC21 issues 90–95] (Doctorless) (reprinted in original colour); Articles: "The Telesnap Archive: The Web of Fear" Episode One – (partially) lost TV episodes^{[t]}; "Vworp Vworp" (Chronology of Doctor Who comic strips); Bonus: Giant Poster of Kandyman	DWCC
CC-20	Doctor Who Classic Comics Issue 19	27 April 1994	52	Doctor Who Magazine comic strip: "Kane's Story" [Doctor Who Magazine issue 104] (6D) (colourised reprint); Polystyle comic strips: "The Wreckers" [TV Comic issues 1223–1231] (4D) (colourised reprint); "Who is the Stranger" [TV Action issue 104] (3D) (colourised reprint); TV Century 21 comic strips: "The Daleks: Road to Conflict"^{[u]} [TVC21 issues 96–104] (Doctorless) (reprinted in original colour); Articles: "The Telesnap Archive: The Web of Fear" Episode Three – (partially) lost TV episodes^{[t]}; "Stripped Assets" (Interviews with comic strip creators: TVC21's editor Alan Fennell about the Daleks strip)	DWCC
CC-21	Doctor Who Classic Comics Issue 20	25 May 1994	52	Doctor Who Magazine comic strip: "Abel's Story" [Doctor Who Magazine issue 105] (6D) (colourised reprint); Polystyle comic strips: "The Glen of Sleeping" [TV Action issues 107–111] (3D) (reprinted in original colour); "Challenge of the Piper" [aka "Home to Hamelin"]^{[v]} [TV Comic issues 705–709] (1D) (colourised reprint); "The Exterminator" [TV Comic issues 803–806] (2D) (each episode: page 1 of 3 reprinted in original colour and pages 2–3 colourised reprints); Articles: "The Telesnap Archive: The Web of Fear" Episode Five – (partially) lost TV episodes^{[t]}; "Vworp Vworp" (Chronology of Doctor Who comic strips)	DWCC
CC-22	Doctor Who Classic Comics Issue 21	22 June 1994	52	Doctor Who Magazine comic strips: "The Warrior's Story" [Doctor Who Magazine issue 106] (6D) (colourised reprint); "The Stockbridge Horror" Part 1 [Doctor Who Magazine issues 70–72] (5D) (colourised reprint); The Incredible Hulk Presents comic strip: "Once in a Lifetime" [The Incredible Hulk Presents issue 1] (7D) (colourised reprint); "War World!" [The Incredible Hulk Presents issue 4] (7D) (colourised reprint); Articles: "The Telesnap Archive: The Wheel in Space" Episode One – (partially) lost TV episodes^{[w]}; "Vworp Vworp" (Chronology of Doctor Who comic strips)	DWCC
CC-23	Doctor Who Classic Comics Issue 22	20 July 1994	52	Doctor Who Magazine comic strips: "Frobisher's Story" [Doctor Who Magazine issue 107] (6D) (colourised reprint); "The Stockbridge Horror" Part 2 [Doctor Who Magazine issue 73] (5D) (colourised reprint); Polystyle comic strips: "Moon Landing" [TV Comic issues 710–712] (1D) (colourised reprint); "Time in Reverse" [aka "In Reverse"]^{[x]} [TV Comic issues 713–715] (1D) (colourised reprint); "The Monsters from the Past" [TV Comic issues 807–811] (2D) (episodes 1–3: page 1 of 3 reprinted in original colour and pages 2–3 colourised reprints / episodes 4–5: colourised reprints [two pages only each episode]); Articles: "The Telesnap Archive: The Wheel in Space" Episode Three – (partially) lost TV episodes^{[w]}; "Vworp Vworp" (Chronology of Doctor Who comic strips)	DWCC
CC-24	Doctor Who Classic Comics Issue 23	17 August 1994	52	Doctor Who Magazine comic strips: "The Stockbridge Horror" Part 3 [Doctor Who Magazine issues 74–75] (5D) (colourised reprint); "The Return of the Daleks" Part 1 [Doctor Who Weekly issues 1–2] (Secondary strip: Doctorless) (colourised reprint); Polystyle comic strips: "Lizardworld" [TV Comic issues 716–719] (1D) (colourised reprint); "The Threat from Beneath" [TV Action issue 112] (3D) (colourised reprint); Articles: "Framecount" (DWM back-up strip list)^{[y]}; "Behind the frame" (overview of the DWM back-up strip)^{[y]}; "The Telesnap Archive: The Wheel in Space" Episode Five – (partially) lost TV episodes^{[w]}; "Vworp Vworp" (Chronology of Doctor Who comic strips)	DWCC
CC-25	Doctor Who Classic Comics Issue 24	14 September 1994	52	Doctor Who Magazine comic strips: "The Return of the Daleks" Part 2 [Doctor Who Weekly issues 3–4] (Secondary strip: Doctorless) (colourised reprint); "The Final Quest" [Doctor Who Weekly issue 8] (Secondary strip: Doctorless) (colourised reprint); The Incredible Hulk Presents comic strip: "Once in a Lifetime" [The Incredible Hulk Presents issue 5] (7D) (colourised reprint); Polystyle comic strips: "The Didus Expedition" [TV Comic issues 736–739] (1D) (reprinted in original colour); "The TARDIS Worshippers" [TV Comic issues 812–815] (2D) (colourised reprint); "Back to the Sun" [TV Action issues 116–119] (3D) (reprinted in original colour); Articles: "The Telesnap Archive: The Ice Warriors" Episode One – (partially) lost TV episodes^{[z]}; "Vworp Vworp" (Chronology of Doctor Who comic strips)	DWCC
CC-26	Doctor Who Classic Comics Issue 25	12 October 1994	52	Doctor Who Magazine comic strips: "The Star Beast" Part 1 [Doctor Who Weekly issues 19–22] (4D) (colourised reprint); "K9's Finest Hour" [Doctor Who Weekly issue 12] (Secondary strip: Doctorless) (colourised reprint); Polystyle comic strips: "Space War Two" [TV Comic issues 816–819] (2D) (colourised reprint); "The Labyrinth" [TV Action issue 120] (3D) (colourised reprint); The Incredible Hulk Presents comic strip: "A Switch in Time!" [The Incredible Hulk Presents issue 6] (7D) (colourised reprint); Articles: "The Telesnap Archive: The Ice Warriors" Episode Three – (partially) lost TV episodes^{[z]}; "Vworp Vworp" (Chronology of Doctor Who comic strips)	DWCC
CC-27	Doctor Who Classic Comics Issue 26	9 November 1994	52	Doctor Who Magazine comic strips: "The Star Beast" Part 2 [Doctor Who Weekly issues 23–26] (4D) (colourised reprint); "Warlord of the Ogrons" [Doctor Who Weekly issues 13–14] (Secondary strip: Doctorless) (colourised reprint); Polystyle comic strips: "Egyptian Escapade" [TV Comic issues 820–823] (2D) (colourised reprint); "The Coming of the Cybermen" [TV Comic issues 824–827] (2D) (reprinted in original colour); Articles: "The Telesnap Archive: The Ice Warriors" Episode Five – (partially) lost TV episodes^{[z]}; "Vworp Vworp" (Chronology of Doctor Who comic strips)	DWCC
CC-28	Doctor Who Classic Comics Issue 27	7 December 1994	52	Doctor Who Magazine comic strips: "Timeslip" [Doctor Who Weekly issues 17–18] (4D; 1D, 2D, 3D) (colourised reprint); Polystyle comic strips: "The Spoilers" [TV Action issue 123] (3D) (colourised reprint); "The Vortex" [TV Action issues 125–129] (3D) (reprinted in original colour); "The Unheard Voice" [TV Action issue 131] (3D) (colourised reprint); Articles: "Doctor Who Classic Comics Guide"; "Vworp Vworp" (Chronology of Doctor Who comic strips)	DWCC
Notes: a The DWCC began with the first strip issued in Countdown comic, which the Polystyle strip transferred to from TV Comic after issue 999 in February 1971.; b There was no Doctor Who comic strip in Countdown issue 14.; c "The Amaryll Challenge" is the fourth of the 16 Dalek stories from TVC21, after "Genesis of Evil", "Power Play", and "Duel of the Daleks". Note TVC21 originally ran these as a 104-part one pager comic epic, which was only later renamed 'The Dalek Chronicles' with formalised sequence titles by Doctor Who Magazine. While some titles were given in the preceding issue's "coming next time" closing caption, after doing research and interviewing those involved in the original strips, John Ainsworth proposed the sequence titles. Various reprints had occurred of some of the episodes over the years, and DWM began reprinting these strips – in black and white – from issue 33 of Doctor Who Weekly (28 May 1980). This run eventually went to colour, but never completed. It began again in DWM in colour with the first episode of The Dalek Chronicles in issue 180 (27 November 1991) but only ran for a few episodes before transferring to Doctor Who Classic Comics (1992–1994) in this first issue.; d "The Klepton Parasites", was not only the first ever First Doctor strip, but also the first ever Doctor Who comic strip story.; e The second and third episodes of "The Penta Ray Factor" are printed out of order. This mistake will be repeated in the Doctor Who Magazine Special which collects all the episodes of the Daleks as The Dalek Chronicles in August 1994. See Marvel 'Specials' section above.; f "Backtime" was originally published over seven issues of Countdown, with the first two parts in colour, and the remaining five parts in black and white. Doctor Who Classic Comics thus reprinted the first two originally coloured episodes in issue 3; then printed the remaining episodes in issue 4, now freshly colourised.; g "The Extortioner" is the first ever Second Doctor Doctor Who comic strip story.; h "The Arkwood Experiment" is the first ever Third Doctor Doctor Who comic strip story.; i "Death Flower!" is the first ever Fourth Doctor Doctor Who comic strip story.; j "Dr. Who and the Daleks" was the first American produced comic strip, and this one-off adaptation of Dr. Who and the Daleks (1965) would not be followed by a Daleks' Invasion Earth 2150 A.D. (1966) adaptation. The Americans would not produce their own Doctor Who strips again until IDW in 2008 (see 'DWM Parallel Publications: Panini Years' section below), although there would be colourised reprints in Doctor Who Marvel Comics USA (1980–1986) taken from the UK's DWM.; k "The Neutron Knights" was the final Fourth Doctor comic strip of Doctor Who Magazine during its initial run (other strips would later appear during the publication's 'Past Doctors' period [1994–1996]).; l "The Tides of Time" is the first ever Fifth Doctor Doctor Who comic strip story.; m "Shark Bait" is also known as "The Frog People" and "Doctor Who meets the Frog People". Comic historian Paul Scoones goes with "Doctor Who meets the Frog People" writing this title appeared as the 'synopsis' submitted to the BBC for sign-off prior to publication, but mentions that the 'Comics Checklist', first printed 'in Doctor Who Monthly #62' (1982), calls the story "Shark Bait". The inference being here that DWM made the title up (seeing as not all the early strips were given names on the page), and that DWCC went with this name too.; n "The Tides of Time" is the first ever original DWM comic strip to have pages appear in colour. This was the first two pages of issue 66.; o This one-off DWCC 'Autumn Special' is essentially a 'Graphic Novel'. In the list of Marvel era 'Graphic Novels' (see 'Doctor Who Magazine Graphic Novels (1980–1994)' sub-section above, where it appears as eighth in a list of ten) it is the first to present mostly original material rather than reprints, with only the final 'Graphic Novel' of this era, Age of Chaos, presenting wholly original material.; p "Evening's Empire": what was Part 1 of this story appeared in DWM issue 180 [1991], however, the rest of strip was never published due to production issues. DWM editor, at the time of original production, John Freemen comments 'for a combination of reasons, too lengthy to go in to'. In this DWCC one-off 'Autumn Special' pages 7–13 (the original Part 1) appear slightly revised, with a new opening section (pages 3–6) and then the rest of the story (8–50).; q Issue 13 of DWCC adopted a slightly 'new-look' in celebration of the first year of publication, and promised that this was 'the first step of a radical change for the magazine' over the next few issues, although they would 'not [be] losing any strips'. It was in this context that a free bonus badge was also being given away free with the magazine. The radical change appeared in issue 15 with the introduction of the Telesnap Archive of lost TV episodes.; r The fifth episode of "The Terrorkon Harvest" has missing text in the opening text box, this mistake would be repeated in the DWM 'Special' compilation reprint 'The Dalek Chronicles' (August 1994). See 'Doctor Who Magazine Specials (1980–1996)' subsection above.; s The Telesnap Archive of lost TV episodes compiled by DWCC assistant editor Marcus Hearn from John Cura's original photographs was a new feature starting in issue 15. The Archive would alternate between both DWCC and Doctor Who Magazine. Accordingly, while Episode One of Fury from the Deep appeared here, Episode Two appeared in DWM issue 208 a fortnight later. Episode Three appeared in DWCC issue 16; Episode Four appeared in DWM issue 209; Episode Five appeared in DWCC issue 17; and Episode Six appeared in DWM issue 210.; t At the time of publication, only Episode One of The Web of Fear (and a few clips of the other episodes) existed in the BBC Archives. The Telesnap Archive of lost TV episodes compiled by DWCC assistant editor Marcus Hearn from John Cura's original photographs decided to cover all the episodes of The Web of Fear beginning in DWCC issue 18, alternating between both DWCC and Doctor Who Magazine. Accordingly, while Episode One of The Web of Fear appeared here, Episode Two appeared in DWM issue 211 a fortnight later. Episode Three appeared in DWCC issue 19; Episode Four appeared in DWM issue 212; Episode Five appeared in DWCC issue 20; and Episode Six appeared in DWM issue 213. In October 2013, the BBC announced that copies of episodes 2, 4, 5 and 6 had been found in Nigeria by Television International Enterprises Archive/Philip Morris, and returned to the BBC Archives. Episode 3 of The Web of Fear was originally among the discovered episodes, but went missing in the months between the discovery of the films and their return to the BBC. A DVD of the story was released on 24 February 2014 with Episode 3 presented as telesnaps over an audio recording of the full soundtrack.; u This is the final Dalek story from TVC21.; v "Challenge of the Piper" is also known as "Home to Hamelin". Comic historian Paul Scoones goes with "Home to Hamelin" writing this title appeared on the original scripts, but mentions that the 'Comics Checklist', first printed 'in Doctor Who Monthly #62' (1982), calls the story "Challenge of the Piper". The inference being here that DWM made the title up (seeing as not all the early strips were given names on the page), and that DWCC went with this name too.; w Only Episodes Three and Six of The Wheel in Space exist in the BBC Archives. The Telesnap Archive of lost / partially lost TV episodes compiled by DWCC assistant editor Marcus Hearn from John Cura's original photographs decided to cover all the episodes of The Wheel in Space beginning in DWCC issue 21, alternating between both DWCC and Doctor Who Magazine. Accordingly, while Episode One of The Wheel in Space appeared here, Episode Two appeared in DWM issue 214 a fortnight later. Episode Three appeared in DWCC issue 22; Episode Four appeared in DWM issue 215; Episode Five appeared in DWCC issue 23; and Episode Six appeared in DWM issue 216.; x "Time in Reverse" is also known as "In Reverse". Comic historian Paul Scoones goes with "In Reverse" writing this title appeared on the original scripts, but mentions that the 'Comics Checklist', first printed 'in Doctor Who Monthly #62' (1982), calls the story "Time in Reverse". The inference being here that DWM augmented the title (seeing as not all the early strips were given names on the page), and that DWCC went with this name too.; y The back-up strip list and overview only includes the secondary strips; in other words, all the original Doctorless strips created for the magazine during the early days of the publication. These articles do not list or explore the tertiary strips of reprints from other Marvel publications included in the publication over pretty much the same period.; z Only episodes Two and Three of The Ice Warriors are missing from the BBC Archives, both of which were animated and released with the four original episodes in 2013The serial was released on DVD on 26 August 2013, with parts 2 and 3 being presented in animated form, with Qurios Entertainment providing the animation. The Telesnap Archive of lost / partially lost TV episodes compiled by DWCC assistant editor Marcus Hearn from John Cura's original photographs decided to cover all the episodes of The Ice Warriors beginning in DWCC issue 24, alternating between both DWCC and Doctor Who Magazine. Accordingly, while Episode One of The Ice Warriors appeared here, Episode Two appeared in DWM issue 217 a fortnight later. Episode Three appeared in DWCC issue 25; Episode Four appeared in DWM issue 218; Episode Five appeared in DWCC issue 26; and Episode Six appeared in DWM issue 219.

The conclusion of Doctor Who Classic Comics was first announced in the Editorial of issue 26. There, assistant editor Marcus Hearn alluded to a 'big finale' the following month; continuing 'We're going out in style with Issue 27 – a special collector's edition with a wrap-round cover' and various other features. Issue 27 appeared with 'Final Jam-Packed Issue!' on the cover, and Hearn – once again providing the Editorial – echoed the previous issue in implicitly saying that the series had come to a natural end. 'With the finest of the Doctor Who strips's pre-Marvel heritage reprinted, our work is largely done. Other projects beckon for us'. With this final issue, DWCC completed the full run of the Countdown / TV Action run (excluding specials and annuals) during the mid-period of the Polystyle Third Doctor strips, before the strips left and then returned to TV Comic. However, of the two TV Comic periods (First, Second, half of the Third, and Fourth Doctors), only 32 of the potential 152 strips were ever reprinted (just over 20%). The situation was even worse with respect to the fifteen or so years of Doctor Who Magazine strips and (admitted far, far shorter run) of The Incredible Hulk Presents strips. That the publication was terminated for reasons other than having completed the Third Doctor Countdown / TV Action strips is the fact that the ongoing "Vworp Vworp" articles, which were printing a chronology of Doctor Who comic strips with short synopses, only reached then end of the Third Doctor Polystyle period.

=== Doctor Who Yearbooks (1992–1996) ===
Between 1992 and 1996 Marvel UK published a number of Doctor Who Yearbooks – essentially annuals – containing articles, comic strips, and short fiction. These continued the tradition of Doctor Who Annuals that had been issued under a separate licence from the BBC by World Distributors between 1965 and 1985 (for the years 1966 to 1986); renaming themselves World International, Ltd. in 1981, but due to falling sales limiting their publishing activities before ceasing trading later that decade.

List of Doctor Who Yearbooks

Yb#	Title	Date	Pages	Fiction	Articles
01	Doctor Who Yearbook [1992]	October 1991	64	Comic strips: "Under Pressure" (7D, 4D & 3D); Brief Encounter short stories: "The Meeting" (1D) [Reprint from DWM #167]; "Future Imperfect" (2D & 3D); "Time on a Vine" (5D); "The Deal" (6D)	"Where it All Began"; "The Doctor Ordered"; "The Complete Guide"; "Behind the Scenes" (TV: "The Curse of Fenric"); "First Call" (TV: "The Curse of Fenric")
02	Doctor Who Yearbook 1993	September 1992	64	Comic strips: "Metamorphosis" (7D); Brief Encounter short stories: "Cambridge Previsited" (1D); "Dream a Little Dream for Me" (2D &7D); "Country of the Blind" (3D); "Farewells" (4D); "Encounter on Burnt Snake Flat" (5D); "A Tourist Invasion" (6D)	"Spearheads From Space" (invaders); "Daggers of the Mind" (manipulators); "Making (New) Myths"; "The Sonic Screwdriver"y; "Collectors Corner: The Silly Season" (novelty merchandise); "Terrible Tunes" (music merchandise); "Dressing Up" (clothing merchandise); "Monster files"; "A4 Schematics"
03	Doctor Who Yearbook 1994	September 1993	64	Comic strips: "A Religious Experience" (1D & 7D); "Rest and Re-Creation" (4D); Short stories: "Loop the Loup" (2D); "Reconnaissance" (3D); "The Changeling Years" (4D); "Perfect Day" (5D); "The More Things Change" (6D); "Pulling Strings" (7D)	"The Unknown Forest" (high-brow perception); "Andrew Pixley's WhoFax" (trivia); "Thirty Years of Doctor Who in Fiction"; "Thirty Years of Doctor Who in Fact"
04	Doctor Who Yearbook 1995	September 1994	64	Comic strips: "The Naked Flame" (4D); "Blood Invocation" (5D); Short stories: "Urrozdinee" (1D); "Briefly Noted" (2D); "The Hungry Bomb" (3D); "Rescue" (Doctorless); "The Beast Inside" (4D); "One Last Try" (5D); "Work is Hell" (6D); "Blood Invocation" (5D); "It's Only a Game" (7D)	"Retrospective: 30 Years in the TARDIS"; "Retrospective: The Paradise of Death" (audio); "Retrospective: Dimensions in Time" (TV)
05	Doctor Who Yearbook 1996	September 1995	96	Comic strips: "Star Beast II" (4D); "Junkyard Demon II" (4D)	"A Brief History of Space and Time" (season guide); "The Nineties"; "Valley of the Lost" (summary of unmade TV story)

=== Doctor Who Poster Magazine (1994–1996) ===
Between 1994 and 1996 Marvel UK published a number of Doctor Who Poster Magazines, produced in full colour with visual image based articles, each with a specific theme. After the first six issues the format of the magazine was changed, but only ran for another two issues before being cancelled.

List of Doctor Who Poster Magazines

PM#	Title	Date	Pages	Features	References
01	Doctor Who Poster Magazine: Issue 1 Daleks: The Story of the Doctor's Deadliest Foe	December 1994	8	"Davros"; "Special Daleks"; "Thals"; "Movellans"; "Terry Nation"; "Dalek Checklist" (TV stories); "The Dalek Films"; + Giant poster	DWPM
02	Doctor Who Poster Magazine: Issue 2 Cybermen: The Future of Mankind?	February 1995	8	"The Creation of the Cybermen; "The Powers Behaind the Throne; "Cryons"; "Cybermats"; "Kit Pedler"; "Gary Davis"; "Cybermen Checklist" (TV stories); "Off Camera"; + Giant poster	DWPM
03	Doctor Who Poster Magazine: Issue 3 The Silurians: Monsters from the Dawn of Time	April 1995	8	"The Little Planet"; "The Behemoths"; "Silurians"; "Sea Devils"; "Creators of the Myth"; "Reptile Checklist" (TV stories); "Homo Reptilia in Print" (books & comic strips); + Giant poster (Sea Devils)	DWPM
04	Doctor Who Poster Magazine: Issue 4 UNIT: Watching the Skies	June 1995	8	"We deal with the odd – the unexplained..."; "The Brigadier"; "UNIT checklist" (TV stories); "Key UNIT Personnel"; "Five Rounds Rapid" (Monster UNIT has faced); + Giant poster	DWPM
05	Doctor Who Poster Magazine: Issue 5 The Time Lords of Gallifrey	August 1995	8	"Time Lord overview"; "The Companions"; "Time Lord Checklist" (TV stories); "The Time Lords of Gallifrey" (significant characters); + 2 Giant posters (Master & Rani)	DWPM
06	Doctor Who Poster Magazine: Issue 6 The Sontarans: Vicious Clone Warriors	September 1995	8	"Clone Warriors"; "The Creator: Robert Holmes"; "Sontaran Checklist" (TV stories); "Linx"; "Stor"; "Styre"; "Stike"; "A Day in the Life of a Sontaran"; + Giant poster	DWPM
07	Doctor Who Poster Magazine: Issue 7 "Remembrance of the Daleks"; 1st New-Look Issue	December 1995	8	"Characters and Background"; "The Shoreditch Incident"; "The Daleks"	DWPM
08	Doctor Who Poster Magazine: Issue 8 "Pyramids of Mars"	January / February 1996	8	"Characters and Background"; "The Return of the Red God"; "The final pages from the journal of Marcus Scarman, April 1911"	DWPM

== DWM Parallel Publications: Panini Years (1995–present) ==
=== DWM related Doctor Who strips (1996–1997) ===
- Radio Times comic strip (1996–1997)

=== Special Editions (2002–present) ===
From 2002 Doctor Who Magazine has been producing a regular series of "Special Editions", generally released three times a year. These are stand alone magazines themed around a specific topic and carrying a much higher page count than the regular magazine. Over the run, so far, there have been eight themes:

- Doctor Who eras (2002–2014): These issues explored the stories in a Doctor's era, sometimes over a number of 'volumes'. This theme was named The Complete x Doctor for the classic series, and The Doctor Who Companion for the post-2005 series – although the last two of these have different names, the Official Guide covering the final part of the Eleventh Doctor's final season (April 2014), and The Year of the Doctor 50th Anniversary edition (August 2014). This strand of the "Special Editions" came to an end with these two releases, but is continued in the rebooted "Bookazine" series as of 2019 with the Twelfth Doctor.
- Anniversaries (2003–): Beginning with We Love Doctor Who (November 2003), celebrating the 40th anniversary of the first broadcast of the TV show, the Special Editions have marked all the major milestones of the programme. In the case of the 50th Anniversary edition (August 2014), this publication also had the function of being the final part of the Doctor Who eras thematic, which post-2005 was labelled The Doctor Who Companion (in all but this and the penultimate instalment, tagged an Official Guide).
- In Their Own Words (2005–2010): An overview of the programme's history produced chronologically. This series collected excerpts from interviews with Doctor Who cast and crew over the years 1963 to 2009. The series concluded in 2010.
- Comic strip reprints (2006–2008): The Special Editions became the reprint format for the main comic strip for the Ninth Doctor (April 2006) and some of the mid-period Tenth Doctor (April 2008). These strips were, however, also collected in the Collected Edition format (2004–present) in The Cruel Sea (2014) for the Ninth Doctor; and The Widow's Curse (2009, Collected Tenth Doctor Comic Strips Volume 2).
- Missing Episodes (2013): The three 2013 Special Editions published Telesnaps from missing episodes from the Hartnell and Troughton eras.
- Sarah Jane Adventures (2009–2012): Three special editions between 2009 and 2012 covering the production of the "Doctor Who" television spin-off "The Sarah Jane Adventures".
- Yearbooks (2015–): Beginning with the 2015 Yearbook (December 2014), these publications are issued once a year looking back over the previous year in Doctor Who.
- Topics (2015–): In the wake of the first "Doctor Who Yearbook" (2015; published December 2014), the "Special Editions" devoted the other two releases of 2015 to specific topics: The Art of Doctor Who (April 2015) and The Music of Doctor Who (August 2015). This pattern of a Yearbook followed by two topics has continued to present.

List of Special Editions

SE#	Series#	Title	Date	Pages	Contents	References
01	C-01	The Complete Fifth Doctor	March 2002	68	A detailed look at the complete run of Fifth Doctor stories and their various spin offs. This included in-depth articles on the production the seasons and updates on DWM's original Archive features on the serials (by Andrew Pixley), a short essay on a specific aspect of each of the TV stories (by various fan/writers) and detailed overviews of the Fifth Doctor's appearances in comics (by John Ainsworth), novels (by Matt Michael) and audio plays (by Gary Gillatt).	
02	C-02	The Complete Third Doctor	July 2002	84	A detailed look at the complete run of Third Doctor stories and their various spin offs. This included in-depth articles on the production of each of the seasons covered and Archive updates on each serial, a short essay on a specific aspect of each of the TV stories and detailed overviews of the Third Doctor's appearances in comics, novels and audio (in this case, strictly radio) plays.	
03	C-03	The Complete Sixth Doctor	September 2002	68	A detailed look at the complete run of Sixth Doctor stories and their various spin offs. This included in-depth articles on the production of each of the seasons covered and Archive updates on each serial, a short essay on a specific aspect of each of the TV stories and detailed overviews of the Sixth Doctor's appearances in comics, novels and audio plays.	
04	C-04	The Complete Second Doctor	January 2003	84	A detailed look at the complete run of Second Doctor stories and their various spin offs. This included in-depth articles on the production of each of the seasons covered and Archive updates on each serial, a short essay on a specific aspect of each of the TV stories and detailed overviews of the Second Doctor's appearances in comics and novels.	
05	C-05	The Complete Eighth Doctor	July 2003	84	A detailed look at the Eighth Doctor and his various spin offs. This included a detailed archive feature on the making of the 1996 TV movie, a look at the history of Doctor Who in the intervening years following the end of the TV show and a detailed overview of the Eighth Doctor's appearances in comics, novels and audio plays.	
06	A-01	Doctor Who 1963–2003: We Love Doctor Who	November 2003	84	Celebrating the 40th anniversary of the first broadcast of the TV show readers of Doctor Who Magazine had been asked to vote for their all-time favourite aspects of the show in various categories. This magazine published the results and essays on the most popular TV stories, books, comics, writers and contributors.	
07	C-06	The Complete First Doctor	January 2004	100	A detailed look at the complete run of First Doctor stories and their various spin offs. This included in-depth articles on the production of each of the seasons covered and Archive updates on each serial, a short essay on a specific aspect of each of the TV stories and detailed overviews of the First Doctor's appearances in comics and novels.	
08	C-07	The Complete Fourth Doctor – Volume One	July 2004	84	A detailed look at the run of the first four seasons of Fourth Doctor TV stories. This included in-depth articles on the production of each of the seasons covered and Archive updates on each serial, plus a short essay on a specific aspect of each of the TV stories.	
09	C-08	The Complete Fourth Doctor – Volume Two	October 2004	84	A detailed look at the final three seasons of the Fourth Doctor TV stories. This included in-depth articles on the production of each of the seasons covered and a short essay on a specific aspect of each of the TV stories and Archive updates on each serial, plus a detailed overview of the Fourth Doctor's appearances in comics and novels.	
10	C-09	The Complete Seventh Doctor	February 2005	100	A detailed look at the complete run of Seventh Doctor stories and their various spin offs. This included in-depth articles on the production of each of the seasons covered and Archive updates on each serial, a short essay on a specific aspect of each of the TV stories and detailed overviews of the Seventh Doctor's appearances in comics, audio plays and novels. There was also an errata section correcting some errors in the previously published volumes.	
11	C-10	The Doctor Who Companion – Series One	July 2005	100	A guide to the production of the first series of the revived TV show. This included a detailed look at the production of each of the episodes by Andrew Pixley, articles on aspects of the design work on various episodes, a look at some of the special effects, a profile of the Ninth Doctor and the original series pitch with annotated notes by show runner Russell T Davies.	
12	OW-01	In Their Own Words – Volume 1: 1963–1969	November 2005	100	A chronological commentary on the making of the TV series in the 1960s by those involved in its production. This is collated from extracts of interviews previously published in Doctor Who Magazine with the individuals concerned.	
13	CS-01	The Ninth Doctor Collected Comics	April 2006	100	A reprint of all the Ninth Doctor comic strip stories published by Panini Comics. This includes: "The Love Invasion" (Doctor Who Magazine issues 355–357); "Art Attack" (Doctor Who Magazine issue 358); "The Cruel Sea" (Doctor Who Magazine issues 359–362); "Mr Nobody" (Doctor Who Annual 2006); "A Groatsworth of Wit" (Doctor Who Magazine issues 363–364). [Reprinted in official Comic Strip Collected Edition as The Cruel Sea (2014)].	
14	C-11	The Doctor Who Companion – Series Two	August 2006	108	A guide to the production of the second series of the revived TV show. This included a detailed look at the production of each of the episodes by Andrew Pixley and the original second series pitch with annotated notes by show runner Russell T Davies.	
15	OW-02	In Their Own Words – Volume 2: 1970–1976	November 2006	100	A chronological commentary on the making of the TV series in the first part of the 1970s by those involved in its production. This is collated from extracts of interviews previously published in Doctor Who Magazine with the individuals concerned.	
16	OW-03	In Their Own Words – Volume 3: 1977–1981	April 2007	100	A chronological commentary on the making of the TV series in the latter part of the 1970s and start of the 1980s by those involved in its production. This is collated from extracts of interviews previously published in Doctor Who Magazine with the individuals concerned.	
17	C-12	The Doctor Who Companion – Series Three	August 2007	132	A guide to the production of the third series of the revived TV show. This included a detailed look at the production of each of the episodes by Andrew Pixley and an overview of the development of the series by show runner Russell T Davies.	
18	OW-04	In Their Own Words – Volume 4: 1982–1986	November 2007	100	A chronological commentary on the making of the TV series in the 1980s by those involved in its production. This is collated from extracts of interviews previously published in Doctor Who Magazine with the individuals concerned.	
19	CS-02	The Tenth Doctor Comics	April 2008	100	A reprint of most of the Tenth Doctor and Martha Jones comic strip stories from Doctor Who Magazine (so, the Tenth Doctor mid-period) This includes: "The Woman Who Sold the World" (Doctor Who Magazine issues 381–384); "Bus Stop!" (Doctor Who Magazine issue 385); "First" (Doctor Who Magazine issues 386–389); "Death to the Doctor!" (Doctor Who Magazine issue 390) [Reprinted in official Comic Strip Collected Edition as The Widow's Curse (2009, Collected Tenth Doctor Comic Strips Volume 2)].	
20	C-13	The Doctor Who Companion – Series Four	August 2008	148	A guide to the production of the fourth series of the revived TV show. This included a detailed look at the production of each of the episodes by Andrew Pixley and an introduction by show runner Russell T Davies.	
21	OW-05	In Their Own Words – Volume 5: 1987–1996	November 2008	100	A chronological commentary on the making of the TV series in the latter part of the 1980s, the events following the initial cancellation in 1989, and the making of the TV Movie in 1996. This is collated from extracts of interviews previously published in Doctor Who Magazine with the individuals concerned.	
22	A-02	200 Golden Moments	May 2009	148	To mark 200 television stories with the broadcast of "Planet of the Dead", at least one 'golden moment' was chosen from each story, with an essay to celebrate the chosen scene.	
23	SJ-01	Sarah Jane Smith [Volume 1]	October 2009	100	A guide to the production of The Sarah Jane Adventures, covering holiday special "Invasion of the Bane", the first and second series, and the Comic Relief special. This included a detailed look at the production of each of the episodes by Andrew Pixley and an interview with Elisabeth Sladen who played Sarah Jane.	
24	OW-06	In Their Own Words – Volume 6: 1997–2009	February 2010	116	A chronological commentary on the events following the TV Movie in the late 1990s and early 2000s, and the making of the revived series from 2005 to 2009. This is collated from extracts of interviews previously published in Doctor Who Magazine with the individuals concerned. To date, this is the final "In Their Own Words".	
25	C-14	The Doctor Who Companion – The Specials	April 2010	100	A guide to the production of the 2008–2010 specials starring David Tennant, from "Planet of the Dead" to "The End of Time", plus the Proms special "Music of the Spheres" and the animated episode "Dreamland". This included a detailed look at the production of each of the episodes by Andrew Pixley.	
26	C-15	The Doctor Who Companion – The Eleventh Doctor Volume One	October 2010	100	Series 5 Part 1. A guide to the production of the first half of the recently aired 2010 series, from "The Eleventh Hour" to "The Vampires of Venice". This included a detailed look at the production of each of the episodes by Andrew Pixley.	
27	C-16	The Doctor Who Companion – The Eleventh Doctor Volume Two	December 2010	100	Series 5 Part 2. A guide to the production of the second half of the recently aired 2010 series, from "Amy's Choice" to "The Big Bang", plus DVD extras "Meanwhile, in the TARDIS". This included a detailed look at the production of each of the episodes by Andrew Pixley.	
28	SJ-02	The Sarah Jane Companion [Volume 2]	December 2010	100	A guide to the production of The Sarah Jane Adventures, covering the third and fourth series. This included a detailed look at the production of each of the episodes by Andrew Pixley.	
29	C-17	The Doctor Who Companion – The Eleventh Doctor Volume Three	September 2011	84	Christmas Special 2010 and Series 6 Part 1. A guide to the production of the next five Eleventh Doctor episodes, from "A Christmas Carol" to "The Doctor's Wife", plus the 2010 Doctor Who Prom, "Doctor Who Live" and the Comic Relief mini-episodes "Space" and "Time". This included a detailed look at the production of each of the episodes by Andrew Pixley.	
30	C-18	The Doctor Who Companion – The Eleventh Doctor Volume Four	December 2011	84	Series 6 Part 2. A guide to the production of the next six Eleventh Doctor episodes, from "The Rebel Flesh" to "The Girl Who Waited", plus the specially-made sequence that introduced the National Television Awards. This included a detailed look at the production of each of the episodes by Andrew Pixley.	
31	C-19	The Doctor Who Companion – The Eleventh Doctor Volume Five	April 2012	84	Series 6 Part 3 and Christmas Special 2011. A guide to the production of the next four Eleventh Doctor episodes, from "The God Complex" to "The Doctor, the Widow and the Wardrobe", plus the interactive attractions The Doctor Who Experience and The Crash of the Elysium. This included a detailed look at the production of each of the episodes by Andrew Pixley.	
32	SJ-03	The Sarah Jane Companion [Volume 3]	August 2012	84	A guide to the production of the fifth and final series of The Sarah Jane Adventures, including outlines from the unmade stories, contributions from Russell T Davies, and a previously unpublished interview with Elisabeth Sladen. This is the last of the three Sarah Jane Smith Special Editions.	
33	C-20	The Doctor Who Companion – The Eleventh Doctor Volume Six	December 2012	100	Series 7 Part 1. A guide to the production of the next five Eleventh Doctor episodes, from "Asylum of the Daleks" to "The Angels Take Manhattan", plus DVD extras "Night and the Doctor", 'Script to Screen' winners "Death Is the Only Answer" and "Good as Gold", the 2011 Children in Need feature, and the online mini-series "Pond Life". This included a detailed look at the production of each of the episodes by Andrew Pixley.	
34	ME-01	The Missing Episodes – The First Doctor	March 2013	100	Missing Episodes Part 1 of 3. A guide to the missing episodes of Doctor Who from the First Doctor's era, collecting the available telesnaps for stories with missing episodes (covering Marco Polo, The Crusade, The Savages, The Smugglers, and The Tenth Planet).	DWS
35	ME-02	The Missing Episodes – The Second Doctor Volume One	July 2013	116	Missing Episodes Part 2 of 3. A guide to the missing episodes of Doctor Who from the Second Doctor's first six stories, collecting the telesnaps for the missing episodes (covering The Power of the Daleks, The Highlanders, The Underwater Menace, The Moonbase, The Macra Terror, and The Faceless Ones).	
36	ME-03	The Missing Episodes – The Second Doctor Volume Two	December 2013	116	Missing Episodes Part 3 of 3. A guide to the missing episodes of Doctor Who from the Second Doctor's remaining stories, collecting the available telesnaps for the missing episodes (covering The Evil of the Daleks, The Abominable Snowmen, The Ice Warriors, The Web of Fear, Fury from the Deep, and The Wheel in Space).	
37	C-21	The Official Guide to the 2013 Series	April 2014	132	Christmas Special 2012 and Series 7 Part 2 – essentially (although unnamed as such) a continuation of "The Doctor Who Companion" series. A guide to the production of the next nine Eleventh Doctor episodes, from "The Snowmen" to "The Name of the Doctor". This included a detailed look at the production of each of the episodes by Andrew Pixley.	DWM
38	C-22; A-03	The Year of the Doctor: The Official Guide to Doctor Who's 50th Anniversary	August 2014	100	As well as an anniversary edition, this publication is also the last of "The Doctor Who Companion" series in the "Special Editions" run (although this series is restarted again in the Bookazine publication with the Twelfth Doctor in 2009). A guide to the production of 50th anniversary special "The Day of the Doctor" and 2014 Christmas special "The Time of the Doctor", plus the online mini-episode "The Night of the Doctor", the drama-documentary "An Adventure in Space and Time", the online spoof "The Five(ish) Doctors Reboot", and the 2013 Doctor Who Prom, including a detailed look at their production by Andrew Pixley. It also included an overview of various other TV and radio tie-in programmes for the anniversary.	DWM
39	YB-01	The 2015 Yearbook	December 2014	100	A look back at the worlds of Doctor Who in 2014, with brief features on the twelve episodes from "Deep Breath" to "Death in Heaven", and articles and interviews on the show's reception, events, merchandise, and fandom.	DWM
40	T-01	The Art of Doctor Who	April 2015	100	Features on the art of the series across its various media over its history.	DWM
41	T-02	The Music of Doctor Who	August 2015	84	Features on the music of the series over its history.	DWM
42	YB-02	The 2016 Yearbook	December 2015	100	A look back at the worlds of Doctor Who in 2015, with brief features on the thirteen episodes from "Last Christmas" to "Hell Bent", and articles and interviews on the show's reception, events, merchandise, and fandom.	DWM
43	T-03	Special Effects	April 2016	100	Features on the special effects of the series over its history.	DWM
44	T-04	On Location	July 2016	100	Features on the location shooting of the series over its history.	DWM
45	YB-03	The 2017 Yearbook	December 2016	100	A look back at the worlds of Doctor Who in 2016, with features on the making of the 2017 series and spinoff Class, and articles and interviews on the show's events, merchandise, and fandom.	DWM
46	T-05	Toys and Games	April 2017	92	A look at Doctor Who toys and games produced since 1964, including interviews with various toy licensees who have produced them over the years.	DWM
47	T-06	Referencing the Doctor	August 2017	84	A look at books detailing both the production of the series and the fictional worlds and characters of the series.	DWM
48	YB-04	The 2018 Yearbook	January 2018	84	Covers the Twelfth Doctor's final adventures, from "The Return of Doctor Mysterio" through to Twice Upon a Time also featuring the First Doctor.	DWM
49	T-07	In The Studio	April 2018	84	Tells the story of the series' sometimes difficult evolution from relatively primitive beginnings to the cutting edge of modern television production.	DWM
50	T-08	The World of Doctor Who	August 2018	84	Explores Doctor Who fandom, and its evolution across the decades into a global phenomenon, with enthusiasts from territories such as the United States, China and New Zealand.	DWM
51	YB-05	The 2019 Yearbook	December 2018	84	Explores Jodie Whittaker's debut as the Doctor and the making of Series 11.	DWM
52	T-09	Costume Design	April 2019	84	Features rare and previously unpublished illustrations showing how the look of a Doctor Who episode evolves from sketch to screen across such diverse settings as distant points in Earth's history and alien civilisations in the far future, with exclusive interviews with many of those designers.	DWM
53	T-10	Target Books	August 2019	84	Explores the story of "Doctor Who" Target books, from the very beginning, their rise and fall to the revival in 2018.	DWM
54	YB-06	The 2020 Yearbook	January 2020	84	Explores the filming for series 12 with Jodie Whittaker's Thirteenth Doctor's second series; Features on the fan remake of "Mission to the Unknown" (a missing First Doctor era Doctorless episode); A celebration of 20 years of Big Finish Doctor Who audios; a tribute to Terrance Dicks, the high-profile Doctor Who television and novel writer; on the online Dalek documentaries	DWMSE

=== Annual / Storybooks (2006–2010) ===
Panini rebooted these in 2006 with the return of Doctor Who to television as an annual. Due to the success of the annual, BBC publishing retrieved the license for that designation, but allowed Panini to continue publishing a yearly Storybook, which they did for another four years.

List of Annual / Storybooks

Yb#	Title	Date	Pages	Contents	References
01	Doctor Who Annual 2006	September 2005	62	TBA	TBA
02	Doctor Who Storybook 2007	July 2006	78	TBA	TBA
03	Doctor Who Storybook 2008	August 2007	78	TBA	TBA
04	Doctor Who Storybook 2009	August 2008	78	TBA	TBA
05	Doctor Who Storybook 2010	August 2009	78	TBA	TBA

=== Doctor Who Classics (IDW Comics) (2008–2014) ===
In January 2008, IDW Publishing, an American comic book company, launched Doctor Who Classics, a monthly comic book series reprinting digitally colourised Fourth, Fifth, Sixth and Seventh Doctor strips from the early issues of DWM. The series was collected in trade paperbacks. The Dave Gibbons Collection was also released in an oversized hardback edition.

List of Classics

Title	Contents	Pages	Published	ISBN
Volume 1	"The Iron Legion" (issues 1–8) "City of the Damned" (issues 9–16) "Timeslip" (issues 17–18) "The Star Beast" (issues 19–26)	112	July 2008	ISBN 978-1-60010-189-2
Volume 2	"The Star Beast" (issue 26 only) "The Dogs of Doom" (issues 27–34) "The Time Witch" (issues 35–38) "Dragon's Claw" (issues 39–45) "The Collector" (issue 46) "Dreamers of Death" (issues 47–48)	120	December 2008	ISBN 978-1-60010-289-9
Volume 3	"Changes" (issues 118–119) "Culture Shock!" (issue 139) "The World Shapers" (issues 127–129) "The Life Bringer" (issues 49–50) "War of the Worlds" (issue 51) "The Spider-God" (issue 52) "The Deal" (issue 53) "End of the Line" (issues 54–55) "The Freefall Warriors" (issues 56–57)	128	May 2009	ISBN 978-1-60010-425-1
Volume 4	"Junk-Yard Demon" (issues 58–59) "The Neutron Knights" (issue 60) "The Tides of Time" (issues 61–67) "Stars Fell on Stockbridge" (issues 68–69) "The Stockbridge Horror" (issues 70–75)	152	November 2009	ISBN 978-1-60010-534-0
Volume 5	"Lunar Lagoon" (issues 76–77) "4-Dimensional Vistas" (issues 78–83) "The Moderator" (issues 84, 86–87) "Skywatch-7" (issue 58)	104	March 2010	ISBN 978-1-60010-608-8
Volume 6	"The Shape Shifter" (issues 88–89) "Voyager, Parts 1–5" (issues 90–94) "Polly The Glot" (issues 95–97) "Once Upon A Time Lord" (issues 98–99) "War-Game, Parts 1 & 2" (issues 100–101) "Fun House" (issues 102–103) "Kane's Story" (issue 104) "Abel's Story" (issue 105) "The Warrior's Story" (issue 106) "Frobisher's Story" (issue 107)	148	December 2010	ISBN 978-1-60010-793-1
Volume 7	"A Cold Day in Hell!" (issues 130–133) "Redemption!" (issue 134) "The Crossroads of Time" (issue 135) "Claws of the Klathi!" (issues 136–138) "Keepsake" (issue 140) "Planet of the Dead" (issues 141–142) "Culture Shock!" (issue 139) "Echoes of the Morgor!" (issues 143–144)	128	September 2011	ISBN 978-1-61377-045-0
The Dave Gibbons Collection	The Iron Legion (issue 1–8); City of the Damned (issue 9–16); The Star Beast (issue 19–26); Dogs of Doom (issue 27–34); The Time Witch (issue 35–38); Dragon's Claw (issue 39–45); The Collector (issue 46); Dreamers of Death (issue 47–48); The Life Bringer! (issue 49–50); The War of Words (issue 51); Spider-God (issue 52); The Deal (issue 53); End of the Line (issue 54–55); The Freefall Warriors (issue 56–57); The Neutron Knights (issue 60); The Tides of Time (issue 61–67); Stars Fell on Stockbridge (issue 68–69)	372	December 2011	ISBN 978-1-61377-063-4
Volume 8	"Exodus" (issue 108) "Revelation" (issue 109) "Genesis" (issue 110) "Nature of the Beast" (issue 111–113) "Time Bomb" (issue 114–116) "Salad Daze" (issue 117) "Changes" (issue 118–119) "Profits of Doom" (issue 120–122) "The Gift" (issue 123–126)	152	23 October 2012	ISBN 978-161377484-7
Volume 9	"Time And Tide" (issues 145–146) "Follow That TARDIS!" (issue 147) "Invaders From Gantac" (issues 148–150) "Nemesis of the Daleks" (issues 152–155) "Stairway To Heaven" (issue 156) "Hunger From The Ends of Time" (issues 157–158) "Train-Flight" (issues 159–161)	140	December 2013	ISBN 978-161377806-7
Omnibus 1	Collects volumes 1, 2 & 3	356	April 2010	ISBN 978-1-60010-622-4
Omnibus 2	Collects volumes 4, 5 & 6	400	September 2011	ISBN 978-1-60010-998-0
Omnibus 3	Collects volumes 7, 8 & 9	TBC	2014 TBC	ISBN TBC

=== Doctor Who Insider Magazine (2011–2012) ===
A North American publication that ran for nine issues, with two specials. It was features and articles based, with a more visual approach than Doctor Who Magazine. It also carried no comic strip.

=== Bookazines (2013–present) ===
For the 50th anniversary of Doctor Who in 2013 three "bookazines" were published under the Doctor Who – 50 Years banner, featuring articles on the Doctor, his companions and the Daleks. These continued into 2014 and beyond, renamed The Essential Doctor Who, again with three issues released annually. In 2018, with the advent of the Thirteenth Doctor, a special one-off edition bookazine was released as part of the series called The Story of Doctor Who. After this, the range continued on with the title The Essential Doctor Who for one final release in February 2019. The series was replaced by The Doctor Who Companion range, with the same release schedule, beginning in June 2019.

List of Bookazines

Bz#	Series#	Title	Date	Pages	Contents	References
01	50Y-01	Doctor Who – 50 Years: The Daleks	May 2013	116	Analysis and review of all the stories featuring the Daleks up until that point, also featuring behind-the-scenes articles.	DWM
02	50Y-02	Doctor Who – 50 Years: The Companions	August 2013	116	Articles on each one of the Doctor's companions, also featuring interviews with their respective actors.	DWM
03	50Y-03	Doctor Who – 50 Years: The Doctor	October 2013	116	Articles on each of the Doctors up until that point, featuring interviews and analysis.	DWM
04	E-01	The Essential Doctor Who: Cybermen	March 2014	116	Analysis and review of all the stories featuring the Cybermen up until that point, also featuring behind-the-scenes articles.	DWM
05	E-02	The Essential Doctor Who: The TARDIS	June 2014	116	Analysis and review of all the stories that prominently feature the TARDIS, also featuring articles on the many designs of the console room.	DWM
06	E-03	The Essential Doctor Who: Alien Worlds	October 2014	116	Encyclopedia-like list of all the alien worlds visited by the Doctor (only planets visited in the television series and not any spinoff material is covered).	DWM
07	E-04	The Essential Doctor Who: The Master	March 2015	116	Analysis and review of all the stories featuring the Master/Missy up until that point, also featuring interviews and behind-the-scenes articles.	DWM
08	E-05	The Essential Doctor Who: Monsters	June 2015	116	Encyclopedia-like list of all the monsters and aliens encountered by the Doctor (only monsters encountered in the television series and not any spinoff material are covered).	DWM
09	E-06	The Essential Doctor Who: Davros and Other Villains	October 2015	116	Articles on each of the Doctor's main adversaries, also featuring interviews with their respective actors and behind-the-scenes analysis of the episodes they feature in.	DWM
10	E-07	The Essential Doctor Who: The Time Lords	March 2016	116	Articles on the numerous stories featuring the Time Lords, also featuring articles on several Time Lord characters featured in the show.	DWM
11	E-08	The Essential Doctor Who: Adventures in History	June 2016	116	Articles on 15 stories which have historical settings. Also featuring interviews with cast and crew that worked on those stories.	DWM
12	E-09	The Essential Doctor Who: Invasions of Earth	October 2016	116	Articles on 13 stories which feature prominent invasions of Earth. Also featuring interviews with cast and crew that worked on those stories, articles on invasions of Earth in other media such as audio dramas, comic strips and books, and articles on organisations such as UNIT.	DWM
13	E-10	The Essential Doctor Who: Robots	March 2017	116	Articles on 18 stories which feature prominent robotic characters. Also featuring interviews with cast and crew that worked on those stories.	DWM
14	E-11	The Essential Doctor Who: Adventures in Space	June 2017	116	Articles on 15 stories set in outer space. Also featuring interviews with cast and crew that worked on those stories, articles about space adventures in the series, and articles on space adventures in other media such as comic strips, books and annuals.	DWM
15	E-12	The Essential Doctor Who: Time Travel	November 2017	116	Articles on 16 stories which feature Time Travel. Also featuring interviews with cast and crew that worked on those stories and articles about Time Travel in the series.	DWM
16	E-13	The Essential Doctor Who: Science and Technology	February 2018	116	Articles on the numerous stories featuring Science and Technology, also featuring articles on several scientific and technological devices found on the show.	DWM
17	E-14	The Essential Doctor Who: Adventures in the Future	June 2018	116	Articles on the numerous stories set in the future from the 21st century to the end of time, exploring landmark episodes and meeting the talents who brought them to the screen.	DWM; DWN
18	–	The Story of Doctor Who	October 2018	116	In conjunction with the first television series of the Thirteenth Doctor, this bookazine is an introduction to the show, with sections devoted to all of the television Doctors and many of the key creative figures across its whole 55-year history.	DWM; DWS
19	E-15	The Essential Doctor Who: Relative Dimensions	February 2019	116	Articles on some of the stories set in parallel universes and alternative dimensions.	DWM; DWS
20	C-01	The Doctor Who Companion – The Twelfth Doctor: Volume One	June 2019	100	Articles on the first four episodes of Series 8 with the Twelfth Doctor: "Deep Breath", "Into the Dalek", "Robot of Sherwood", and "Listen". Originally presented in Doctor Who – The Complete History, revised and updated.	DWM; DWN
21	C-02	The Doctor Who Companion – The Twelfth Doctor: Volume Two	October 2019	100	Articles on the middle four episodes of Series 8 with the Twelfth Doctor: "Time Heist", "The Caretaker", "Kill the Moon", and "Mummy on the Orient Express". Originally presented in Doctor Who – The Complete History, revised and updated.	DWM; DWN
22	C-03	The Doctor Who Companion – The Twelfth Doctor: Volume Three	February 2020	116	Articles on the final episodes of Series 8 and the festive special with the Twelfth Doctor: "Flatline", "In the Forest of the Night", "Dark Water", "Death in Heaven", and "Last Christmas". Originally presented in Doctor Who – The Complete History, revised and updated.	DWM; DWN

== Doctor Who: The Complete History (2015–2019) ==
Beginning on 9 September 2015, Panini published a fortnightly partwork documenting the production of every Doctor Who TV story. Content in the partwork was largely based on Andrew Pixley's Archive features which were initially published in Doctor Who Magazine throughout the 80s, 90s and early 2000s and continue in numerous special editions (see above); however, a considerable amount of new material was written exclusively for the books. The 90-part work was published in a multi-volume hardback form, in association with the BBC and Hachette. Each part features 1–4 stories. As is common with part-works, the volumes were not being released in chronological order by broadcast date, but in an order chosen "to reflect the variety and breadth of the series." In January 2018, it was confirmed that The Complete History was extended from 80 volumes to 90, to include all remaining Twelfth Doctor episodes up to "Twice Upon a Time".

List of volumes

First Doctor (1963–1966)

Volume	Issue	Stories	Published
1	4	1963/64 Series Overview; 100,000 BC (AKA An Unearthly Child); The Mutants (AKA The Daleks)	21 October 2015
2	32	Inside the Spaceship; Marco Polo; The Keys of Marinus; The Aztecs	16 November 2016
3	21	The Sensorites; The Reign of Terror; 1964/65 Series Overview; Planet of Giants	15 June 2016
4	61	The Dalek Invasion of Earth; The Rescue; The Romans; The Web Planet	27 December 2017
5	11	The Crusade; The Space Museum; The Chase; The Time Meddler	27 January 2016
6	47	1965/66 Series Overview; Galaxy 4 Mission to the Unknown; The Myth Makers; The Daleks' Master Plan	14 June 2017
7	73	The Massacre of St Bartholomew's Eve; The Ark; The Celestial Toymaker; The Gunfighters	13 June 2018
8	27	The Savages; The War Machines; 1966/67 Series Overview; The Smugglers; The Tenth Planet	7 September 2016

Second Doctor (1966–1969)

Volume	Issue	Stories	Published
9	34	The Power of the Daleks; The Highlanders; The Underwater Menace; The Moonbase	14 December 2016
10	49	The Macra Terror; The Faceless Ones; The Evil of the Daleks; 1967/68 Series Overview; The Tomb of the Cybermen	12 July 2017
11	20	The Abominable Snowmen; The Ice Warriors; The Enemy of the World; The Web of Fear	1 June 2016
12	67	Fury from the Deep; The Wheel in Space; 1968/69 Series Overview; The Dominators	21 March 2018
13	8	The Mind Robber; The Invasion; The Krotons	16 December 2015
14	64	The Seeds of Death; The Space Pirates; The War Games	7 February 2018

Third Doctor (1970–1974)

Volume	Issue	Stories	Published
15	24	1970 Series Overview; Spearhead from Space; Doctor Who and the Silurians; The Ambassadors of Death	27 July 2016
16	83	Inferno; 1971 Series Overview; Terror of the Autons; The Mind of Evil; The Claws of Axos	31 Oct 2018
17	2	Colony in Space; The Dæmons; 1972 Series Overview; Day of the Daleks	23 September 2015
18	75	The Curse of Peladon; The Sea Devils; The Mutants; The Time Monster	11 July 2018
19	43	1972/73 Series Overview; The Three Doctors; Carnival of Monsters; Frontier in Space	19 April 2017
20	16	Planet of the Daleks; The Green Death; 1973/74 Series Overview; The Time Warrior	6 April 2016
21	54	Invasion of the Dinosaurs; Death to the Daleks; The Monster of Peladon; Planet of the Spiders	20 September 2017

Fourth Doctor (1974–1981)

Volume	Issue	Stories	Published
22	6	1974/75 Series Overview; Robot; The Ark in Space; The Sontaran Experiment	18 November 2015
23	29	Genesis of the Daleks; Revenge of the Cybermen; 1975/76 Series Overview; Terror of the Zygons	5 October 2016
24	25	Planet of Evil; Pyramids of Mars; The Android Invasion; The Brain of Morbius	10 August 2016
25	77	The Seeds of Doom; 1976/77 Series Overview; The Masque of Mandragora; The Hand of Fear	8 August 2018
26	14	The Deadly Assassin; The Face of Evil; The Robots of Death; The Talons of Weng-Chiang	9 March 2016
27	36	1977/78 Series Overview '"Horror of Fang Rock" "The Invisible Enemy" "Image of the Fendahl" "The Sun Makers"	11 January 2017
28	52	Underworld; The Invasion of Time; The Key to Time – 1978/79 Series Overview; The Ribos Operation	23 August 2017
29	46	The Pirate Planet; The Stones of Blood; The Androids of Tara	31 May 2017
30	19	The Power of Kroll; The Armageddon Factor; 1979/80 Series Overview; Destiny of the Daleks	18 May 2016
31	65	City of Death; The Creature from the Pit; Nightmare of Eden; The Horns of Nimon	21 February 2018
32	41	1980/81 Series Overview; The Leisure Hive; Meglos; Full Circle	22 March 2017
33	57	State of Decay; Warriors' Gate; The Keeper of Traken; Logopolis	1 November 2017

Fifth Doctor (1982–1984)

Volume	Issue	Stories	Published
34	23	1982 Series Overview; Castrovalva; Four to Doomsday; Kinda	13 July 2016
35	68	The Visitation; Black Orchid; Earthshock; Time-Flight	4 April 2018
36	39	1983 Series Overview; Arc of Infinity; Snakedance; Mawdryn Undead	22 February 2017
37	56	Terminus; Enlightenment; The King's Demons "The Five Doctors"	18 October 2017
38	9	1984 Series Overview; Warriors of the Deep; The Awakening; Frontios	30 December 2015
39	85	Resurrection of the Daleks; Planet of Fire; The Caves of Androzani	28 November 2018

Sixth Doctor (1984–1986)

Volume	Issue	Stories	Published
40	18	The Twin Dilemma; 1985 Series Overview; Attack of the Cybermen; Vengeance on Varos	4 May 2016
41	79	The Mark of the Rani; The Two Doctors; Timelash; Revelation of the Daleks	5 September 2018
42	50	The Trial of a Time Lord – 1986 Series Overview; The Mysterious Planet; Mindwarp; Terror of the Vervoids; The Ultimate Foe	26 July 2017

Seventh Doctor (1987–1989)

Volume	Issue	Stories	Published
43	30	1987 Series Overview; Time and the Rani; Paradise Towers; Delta and the Bannermen	19 October 2016
44	59	Dragonfire; 1988 Series Overview; Remembrance of the Daleks; The Happiness Patrol	29 November 2017
45	13	Silver Nemesis; The Curse of Fenric; Survival	24 February 2016
46	69	Ghost Light; The Greatest Show in the Galaxy; 1989 Series Overview; Battlefield	18 April 2018

Eighth Doctor (1996)

Volume	Issue	Stories	Published
47	44	1996 Overview "Doctor Who – The Movie"	3 May 2017

Ninth Doctor (2005)

Volume	Issue	Stories	Published
48	12	2005 Series Overview "Rose" "The End of the World" "The Unquiet Dead"	10 February 2016
49	38	"Aliens of London"/"World War Three" "Dalek" "The Long Game" "Father's Day"	8 February 2017
50	62	"The Empty Child"/"The Doctor Dances" "Boom Town" "Bad Wolf"/"The Parting of the Ways"	10 January 2018

Tenth Doctor (2006–2010)

Volume	Issue	Stories	Published
51	7	"The Christmas Invasion"; 2006 Series Overview "New Earth" "Tooth and Claw"	2 December 2015
52	28	"School Reunion"; The Girl in the Fireplace "Rise of the Cybermen"/"The Age of Steel" "The Idiot's Lantern"	21 September 2016
53	33	"The Impossible Planet"/"The Satan Pit" "Love & Monsters" "Fear Her" "Army of Ghosts"/"Doomsday"	30 November 2016
54	58	"The Runaway Bride"; 2007 Series Overview "Smith and Jones" "The Shakespeare Code"	15 November 2017
55	1	"Gridlock" "Daleks in Manhattan"/"Evolution of the Daleks" "The Lazarus Experiment" "42"	9 September 2015
56	15	"Human Nature"/"The Family of Blood" "Blink" "Utopia"/"The Sound of Drums"/"Last of the Time Lords"	23 March 2016
57	53	"Voyage of the Damned"; 2008 Series Overview "Partners in Crime" "The Fires of Pompeii"	6 September 2017
58	63	"Planet of the Ood" "The Sontaran Stratagem/The Poison Sky" "The Doctor's Daughter" "The Unicorn and the Wasp"	24 January 2018
59	40	"Silence in the Library"/"Forest of the Dead" "Midnight" "Turn Left"	8 March 2017
60	81	"The Stolen Earth"/"Journey's End" "The Next Doctor"	3 Oct 2018
61	22	"Planet of the Dead" "The Waters of Mars"	29 June 2016
62	45	"The End of Time"	17 May 2017

Eleventh Doctor (2010–2013)

Volume	Issue	Stories	Published
63	51	2010 Series Overview "The Eleventh Hour" "The Beast Below" "Victory of the Daleks"	9 August 2017
64	31	"The Time of Angels"/"Flesh and Stone" "The Vampires of Venice" "Amy's Choice"	2 November 2016
65	66	"The Hungry Earth"/"Cold Blood" "Vincent and the Doctor" "The Lodger"	7 March 2018
66	60	"The Pandorica Opens"/"The Big Bang" "A Christmas Carol"; 2011 Series Overview "The Impossible Astronaut"/"Day of the Moon"	13 December 2017
67	17	"The Curse of the Black Spot" "The Doctor's Wife" "The Rebel Flesh"/"The Almost People"	20 April 2016
68	37	"A Good Man Goes To War" "Let's Kill Hitler" "Night Terrors"	25 January 2017
70	48	"The Wedding of River Song" "The Doctor, the Widow and the Wardrobe"; 2012–13 Series Overview "Asylum of the Daleks"	28 June 2017
71	5	"Dinosaurs on a Spaceship" "A Town Called Mercy" "The Power of Three"	4 November 2015
72	42	"The Angels Take Manhattan" "The Snowmen" "The Bells of Saint John"	5 April 2017
73	26	"The Rings of Akhaten" "Cold War" "Hide" "Journey to the Centre of the TARDIS"	24 August 2016
74	71	"The Crimson Horror" "Nightmare in Silver" "The Name of the Doctor"	16 May 2018
75	10	2013: 50th Anniversary Overview "The Day of the Doctor" "The Time of the Doctor"	13 January 2016

Twelfth Doctor (2014–2017)

Volume	Issue	Stories	Published
76	3	2014 Series Overview "Deep Breath" "Into the Dalek"	7 October 2015
77	35	"Robot of Sherwood" "Listen" "Time Heist"	28 December 2016
78	55	"The Caretaker" "Kill the Moon" "Mummy on the Orient Express"	4 October 2017
79	70	"Flatline" "In the Forest of the Night" "Dark Water"/"Death in Heaven"	2 May 2018
80	72	"Last Christmas"; 2015 Series Overview "The Magician's Apprentice"/"The Witch's Familiar"	30 May 2018
81	74	"Under the Lake"/"Before the Flood" "The Girl Who Died"	27 June 2018
82	76	"The Woman Who Lived" "The Zygon Invasion"/"The Zygon Inversion"	25 July 2018
83	78	"Sleep No More" "Face the Raven" "Heaven Sent"	22 August 2018
84	80	"Hell Bent" "The Husbands of River Song"	19 September 2018
85	82	"The Return of Doctor Mysterio"; 2017 Series Overview "The Pilot"	17 October 2018
86	84	"Smile" "Thin Ice" "Knock Knock"	14 November 2018
87	86	"Oxygen" "Extremis" "The Pyramid at the End of the World"	12 December 2018
88	88	"The Lie of the Land" "Empress of Mars" "The Eaters of Light"	9 January 2019
89	89	"World Enough and Time"/"The Doctor Falls" "Twice Upon a Time"	23 January 2019
90	90	"Shada" "Dimensions in Time" "The Curse of Fatal Death" "Time Crash"	6 February 2019

== Doctor Who Comic Strip Collected Editions (2004–present) ==
Panini has been collecting the comic sections of the magazines into a number of Collected Editions (trade paperbacks) since 2004, beginning with the Fourth Doctor title The Iron Legion. These Collected Editions have not always been published in the order of original publication in Doctor Who Weekly/Magazine and its Yearbooks, Specials and associated publications. Panini have published two or three of these Collected Editions each year from 2004 to 2019, except 2010 and 2011 when the Collected Editions were put on hold.

As of December 2019 there have been 29 volumes released, the most recent being Ground Zero, which features strips from the First, Third, Fourth, Fifth, and Seventh Doctors. As Panini have now collected all the main strips up to the end of the Twelfth Doctor continuity, they began focusing upon the 'past Doctors' period of the magazine (1994–1996, between the end of the Seventh Doctor continuity and beginning of the Eighth Doctor continuity) and other strips from across its publications throughout the years while they built up enough Thirteenth Doctor strips for a Collected Edition. The first Thirteenth Doctor Collected Edition (volume 30) is due in 2020.

The list of volumes below is placed in the original order of their publication in Doctor Who Magazine, which parallels the continuity of the television series, except for the 'past Doctors' period (1994–1996) when the publication began seeding one-off stories from all the past Doctors from the period prior to and including the Seventh. The Collected Editions with these stories are thus placed between the Seventh and Eighth Doctor continuities, except for irregularities, the most substantial being volume 28 The Clockwise War, which leads with the final strip of the Twelfth Doctor period, but also includes past Doctor stories from the Doctor Who Yearbooks published between 1994 and 1996. Many of the Collected Edition also feature bonus material, such as specially commissioned commentaries by the authors and artists, and sometimes short stories (the latter taken from Doctor Who Magazine).

List of Collected Editions

Title	Doctor	Comic Strips	Authors	Pages	#	Published	ISBN
The Iron Legion	Fourth	"The Iron Legion" (issues 1–8)	Story Pat Mills; art Dave Gibbons	164	01	April 2004	ISBN 1-904159-37-0
The Iron Legion	Fourth	"City of the Damned" (issues 9–16)	Story Pat Mills; art Dave Gibbons	164	01	April 2004	ISBN 1-904159-37-0
The Iron Legion	Fourth	"The Star Beast" (issues 19–26)	Story John Wagner; art Dave Gibbons	164	01	April 2004	ISBN 1-904159-37-0
The Iron Legion	Fourth	"Dogs of Doom" (issues 27–34)	Story John Wagner; art Dave Gibbons	164	01	April 2004	ISBN 1-904159-37-0
The Iron Legion	Fourth	"The Time Witch" (issues 35–38)	Story Steve Moore; art Dave Gibbons	164	01	April 2004	ISBN 1-904159-37-0
Dragon's Claw	Fourth	"Dragon's Claw" (issues 39–45)	Story Steve Moore; art Dave Gibbons	164	02	November 2004	ISBN 1-904159-81-8
Dragon's Claw	Fourth	"The Collector" (issue 46)	Story Steve Moore; art Dave Gibbons	164	02	November 2004	ISBN 1-904159-81-8
Dragon's Claw	Fourth	"Dreamers of Death" (issues 47–48)	Story Steve Moore; art Dave Gibbons	164	02	November 2004	ISBN 1-904159-81-8
Dragon's Claw	Fourth	"The Life Bringer!" (issues 49–50)	Story Steve Moore; art Dave Gibbons	164	02	November 2004	ISBN 1-904159-81-8
Dragon's Claw	Fourth	"The War of Words" (issue 51)	Story Steve Moore; art Dave Gibbons	164	02	November 2004	ISBN 1-904159-81-8
Dragon's Claw	Fourth	"Spider-God" (issue 52)	Story Steve Moore; art Dave Gibbons	164	02	November 2004	ISBN 1-904159-81-8
Dragon's Claw	Fourth	"The Deal" (issue 53)	Story Steve Parkhouse; art Dave Gibbons	164	02	November 2004	ISBN 1-904159-81-8
Dragon's Claw	Fourth	"End of the Line" (issues 54–55)	Story Steve Parkhouse; art Dave Gibbons	164	02	November 2004	ISBN 1-904159-81-8
Dragon's Claw	Fourth	"The Freefall Warriors" (issues 56–57)	Story Steve Parkhouse; art Dave Gibbons	164	02	November 2004	ISBN 1-904159-81-8
Dragon's Claw	Fourth	"Junkyard Demon" (issues 58–59)	Story Steve Parkhouse; art Mike McMahon / Adolfo Buylla	164	02	November 2004	ISBN 1-904159-81-8
Dragon's Claw	Fourth	"The Neutron Knights" (issue 60)	Story Steve Parkhouse; art Dave Gibbons	164	02	November 2004	ISBN 1-904159-81-8
The Tides of Time	Fifth	"The Tides of Time" (issues 61–67)	Story Steve Parkhouse; art Dave Gibbons	212	03	May 2005	ISBN 1-904159-92-3
The Tides of Time	Fifth	"Stars Fell on Stockbridge" (issues 68–69)	Story Steve Parkhouse; art Dave Gibbons	212	03	May 2005	ISBN 1-904159-92-3
The Tides of Time	Fifth	"The Stockbridge Horror" (issues 70–75)	Story Steve Parkhouse; art Mick Austin	212	03	May 2005	ISBN 1-904159-92-3
The Tides of Time	Fifth	"Lunar Lagoon" (issues 76–77)	Story Steve Parkhouse; art Mick Austin	212	03	May 2005	ISBN 1-904159-92-3
The Tides of Time	Fifth	"4-Dimensional Vistas" (issues 78–83)	Story Steve Parkhouse; art Mick Austin	212	03	May 2005	ISBN 1-904159-92-3
The Tides of Time	Fifth	"The Moderator" (issues 84 and 86–87)^{[a]}	Story Steve Parkhouse; art Steve Dillon	212	03	May 2005	ISBN 1-904159-92-3
The Tides of Time	Fourth, First, Second, Third,	"Timeslip" (issues 17–18)	Story Dez Skinn; art by Paul Neary	212	03	May 2005	ISBN 1-904159-92-3
Voyager	Sixth	"The Shape Shifter" (issues 88–89)	Story Steve Parkhouse; art John Ridgway	172	08	November 2007	ISBN 978-1-905239-71-9
Voyager	Sixth	"Voyager" (issues 90–94)	Story Steve Parkhouse; art John Ridgway	172	08	November 2007	ISBN 978-1-905239-71-9
Voyager	Sixth	"Polly The Glot" (issues 95–97)	Story Steve Parkhouse; art John Ridgway	172	08	November 2007	ISBN 978-1-905239-71-9
Voyager	Sixth	"Once Upon A Time-Lord" (issues 98–99)	Story Steve Parkhouse; art John Ridgway	172	08	November 2007	ISBN 978-1-905239-71-9
Voyager	Sixth	"War-Game" (issues 100–101)	Story Alan McKenzie; art by John Ridgway	172	08	November 2007	ISBN 978-1-905239-71-9
Voyager	Sixth; Fifth; Fourth; Second; First	"Funhouse" (issues 102–103)	Story Alan McKenzie; art by John Ridgway	172	08	November 2007	ISBN 978-1-905239-71-9
Voyager	Sixth	"Kane's Story"/"Abel's Story"/"The Warrior's Story"/ "Frobisher's Story" (issues 104–107)	Story Alan McKenzie; art by John Ridgway	172	08	November 2007	ISBN 978-1-905239-71-9
The World Shapers	Sixth	"Exodus!"/"Revelation!"/"Genesis!" (issues 108–110)	Story Alan McKenzie/John Ridgway; art John Ridgway	188	09	May 2008	ISBN 978-1-905239-87-0
The World Shapers	Sixth	"Nature of the Beast!" (issues 111–113)	Story Simon Furman; art John Ridgway	188	09	May 2008	ISBN 978-1-905239-87-0
The World Shapers	Sixth	"Time Bomb" (issues 114–116)	Story Jamie Delano; art John Ridgway	188	09	May 2008	ISBN 978-1-905239-87-0
The World Shapers	Sixth	"Salad Daze" (issue 117)	Story Simon Furman; art John Ridgway	188	09	May 2008	ISBN 978-1-905239-87-0
The World Shapers	Sixth	"Changes" (issues 118–119)	Story Grant Morrison; art John Ridgway	188	09	May 2008	ISBN 978-1-905239-87-0
The World Shapers	Sixth	"Profits of Doom!" (issues 120–122)	Story Mike Collins; art John Ridgway; inks Tim Perkins	188	09	May 2008	ISBN 978-1-905239-87-0
The World Shapers	Sixth	"The Gift" (issues 123–126)	Story Jamie Delano; art John Ridgway; inks Tim Perkins	188	09	May 2008	ISBN 978-1-905239-87-0
The World Shapers	Sixth	"The World Shapers" (issues 127–129)	Story Grant Morrison; art John Ridgway; inks Tim Perkins	188	09	May 2008	ISBN 978-1-905239-87-0
A Cold Day in Hell	Seventh	"A Cold Day in Hell!" (issues 130–133)	Story Simon Furman; art John Ridgway/Tim Perkins (130–133)	180	11	May 2009	ISBN 978-1-84653-410-2
A Cold Day in Hell	Seventh	"Redemption!" (issue 134)	Story Simon Furman; art Kev Hopgood/Tim Perkins	180	11	May 2009	ISBN 978-1-84653-410-2
A Cold Day in Hell	Seventh	"The Crossroads of Time" (issue 135)	Story Simon Furman; art tbc	180	11	May 2009	ISBN 978-1-84653-410-2
A Cold Day in Hell	Seventh	"Claws of the Klathi!" (issues 136–138)	Story Mike Collins; art Kev Hopgood/Dave Hine	180	11	May 2009	ISBN 978-1-84653-410-2
A Cold Day in Hell	Seventh	"Culture Shock!" (issue 139)	Story Grant Morrison; art Bryan Hitch	180	11	May 2009	ISBN 978-1-84653-410-2
A Cold Day in Hell	Seventh	"Keepsake" (issue 140)	Story Simon Furman; art John Higgins	180	11	May 2009	ISBN 978-1-84653-410-2
A Cold Day in Hell	Seventh	"Planet of the Dead" (issues 141–142)	Story John Freeman; art Lee Sullivan	180	11	May 2009	ISBN 978-1-84653-410-2
A Cold Day in Hell	Seventh	"Echoes of the Mogor!" (issues 143–144)	Story Dan Abnett; art John Ridgway	180	11	May 2009	ISBN 978-1-84653-410-2
A Cold Day in Hell	Seventh	"Time and Tide" (issues 145–146)	Story Richard Alan/John Carnell; art Dougie Braithwaite/Dave Elliott	180	11	May 2009	ISBN 978-1-84653-410-2
A Cold Day in Hell	Seventh	"Follow that TARDIS!" (issue 147)	Story John Carnell; art Andy Lanning/Kev Hopgood	180	11	May 2009	ISBN 978-1-84653-410-2
A Cold Day in Hell	Seventh	"Invaders from Gantac!" (issues 148–150)	Story Alan Grant; art Martin Griffiths/Cam Smith	180	11	May 2009	ISBN 978-1-84653-410-2
Nemesis of the Daleks	Seventh	"Nemesis of the Daleks" (issues 152–155)	Story Richard Starkings/John Tomlinson; art Lee Sullivan	196	15	8 Apr 2013	ISBN 978-1-84653-531-4
Nemesis of the Daleks	Seventh	"Stairway to Heaven" (issue 156)	Story John Freeman/Paul Cornell; art Gerry Dolan	196	15	8 Apr 2013	ISBN 978-1-84653-531-4
Nemesis of the Daleks	Seventh	The Incredible Hulk Presents Seventh Doctor strip (issues 1–12):^{[b]} "Once in a Lifetime" (1) "Hunger from the Ends of Time!" (2–3) [reprinted in Doctor Who Magazine issues 157–158] "War World!" (4) "Technical Hitch" (5) "A Switch in Time!" (6) "The Sentinel!" (7) "Who's That Girl!" (8–9) "The Enlightenment of Ly-Chee the Wise" (10) "Slimmer!" (11) "Nineveh!" (12)	Story John Freeman (1, 4, 6);Dan Abnett (2–3, 5); John Tomlinson (7, 12); Simon Furman (8–9); Simon Jowett (10); Mike Collins/Tim Robins (11); art Geoff Senior (1, 6, 11); John Ridgway (2–3); Art Wetherell/Dave Harwood (4); Art Wetherell (5); Andy Wildman (7, 10); John Marshall/Stephen Baskerville (8–9); Cam Smith (12)	196	15	8 Apr 2013	ISBN 978-1-84653-531-4
Nemesis of the Daleks	Seventh	"Train-Flight" (issues 159–161)	Story Andrew Donkin/Graham S. Brand; art John Ridgway	196	15	8 Apr 2013	ISBN 978-1-84653-531-4
Nemesis of the Daleks	Seventh	"Doctor Conkeror!" (issue 162)	Story Ian Rimmer; art Mike Collins	196	15	8 Apr 2013	ISBN 978-1-84653-531-4
Nemesis of the Daleks	Doctorless	"Abslom Daak... Dalek Killer" (issues 17–20)^{[c]}	Story Steve Moore; art Steve Dillon	196	15	8 Apr 2013	ISBN 978-1-84653-531-4
Nemesis of the Daleks	Doctorless	"Star Tigers" [I] (issues 27–30)^{[c]} "Star Tigers" [II] (issues 44–46)	Story Steve Moore; art Steve Dillon/David Lloyd	196	15	8 Apr 2013	ISBN 978-1-84653-531-4
The Good Soldier	Seventh	"Fellow Travellers" (issues 164–166)	Story Andrew Cartmel; art Arthur Ranson	132	20	5 May 2015	ISBN 978-1-84653-659-5
The Good Soldier	Seventh	"Darkness Falling"/"Distractions"/"The Mark of Mandragora" (issues 167–172)	Story Dan Abnett; pencils Lee Sullivan; inks Mark Farmer	132	20	5 May 2015	ISBN 978-1-84653-659-5
The Good Soldier	Seventh	"Party Animals" (issue 173)	Story Gary Russell; pencils Mike Collins; inks Steve Pini	132	20	5 May 2015	ISBN 978-1-84653-659-5
The Good Soldier	Seventh	"The Chameleon Factor" (issue 174)	Story Paul Cornell; pencils Lee Sullivan; inks Mark Farmer	132	20	5 May 2015	ISBN 978-1-84653-659-5
The Good Soldier	Seventh	"The Good Soldier" (issues 175–178)	Story Andrew Cartmel; pencils Mike Collins; inks Steve Pini	132	20	5 May 2015	ISBN 978-1-84653-659-5
The Good Soldier	Seventh	"A Glitch in Time" (issue 179)	Story John Freeman; art Richard Whitaker	132	20	5 May 2015	ISBN 978-1-84653-659-5
The Good Soldier	Seventh	"Seaside Rendezvous" (DWM Summer Special 1991)	Story John Freeman; pencils Gary Frank; inks Stephen Baskerville; art Lee Sullivan	132	20	5 May 2015	ISBN 978-1-84653-659-5
Evening's Empire	Seventh	"Evening's Empire" (issue 180 & Doctor Who Classic Comics – Autumn Holiday Special 1993)^{[d]}	Story Andrew Cartmel; art Richard Piers Rayner	132	22	July 2016	ISBN 978-1-84653-728-8
Evening's Empire	Seventh	"The Grief" (issues 185–187)	Story Dan Abnett; pencils Vincent Danks; inks by Adolfo Buylla/Robin Riggs	132	22	July 2016	ISBN 978-1-84653-728-8
Evening's Empire	Seventh	"Ravens" (issues 188–190)	Story Andrew Cartmel; pencils Brian Williamson; inks Cam Smith/Steve Pini	132	22	July 2016	ISBN 978-1-84653-728-8
Evening's Empire	Seventh	"Memorial" (issue 191)	Story Scott Gray; art John Ridgway	132	22	July 2016	ISBN 978-1-84653-728-8
Evening's Empire	Seventh	"Cat Litter" (issue 192)	Story Marc Platt; art John Ridgway	132	22	July 2016	ISBN 978-1-84653-728-8
Evening's Empire	Doctorless	"Conflict of Interests" (issue 183)	Story Dan Abnett; pencils Richard Whitaker; inks Cam Smith	132	22	July 2016	ISBN 978-1-84653-728-8
Emperor of the Daleks ^{[q]}	Seventh	"Pureblood" (issues 193–196)	Story Dan Abnett; art Colin Andrew	180	24	May 2017	ISBN 978-1-84653-807-0
Emperor of the Daleks ^{[q]}	Seventh; First	"Flashback" (DWM Winter Special 1992)	Story Scott Gray; art John Ridgway	180	24	May 2017	ISBN 978-1-84653-807-0
Emperor of the Daleks ^{[q]}	Seventh	"Emperor of the Daleks" (issues 197–202)	Story Paul Cornell; art Lee Sullivan	180	24	May 2017	ISBN 978-1-84653-807-0
Emperor of the Daleks ^{[q]}	Sixth	"Up Above The Gods" (issue 227)	Story Richard Alan; art Lee Sullivan	180	24	May 2017	ISBN 978-1-84653-807-0
Emperor of the Daleks ^{[q]}	Seventh	"Final Genesis" (issues 203–206)	Story Scott Gray; art Colin Andrew	180	24	May 2017	ISBN 978-1-84653-807-0
Emperor of the Daleks ^{[q]}	Seventh	"Time & Time Again" (issue 207)	Story Paul Cornell; art John Ridgway	180	24	May 2017	ISBN 978-1-84653-807-0
Emperor of the Daleks ^{[q]}	Seventh	"Cuckoo" (issues 208–210)	Story Dan Abnett; art John Ridgway	180	24	May 2017	ISBN 978-1-84653-807-0
Emperor of the Daleks ^{[q]}	Seventh	"Uninvited Guest" (issue 211)	Story Scott Gray; art John Ridgway	180	24	May 2017	ISBN 978-1-84653-807-0
Land of the Blind; Multi-Doctor Volume 1 ^{[e]}	Fourth	"Victims" (issues 212–214)	Story Dan Abnett; art Colin Andrew	130	26	July 2018	ISBN 978-1846538865
Land of the Blind; Multi-Doctor Volume 1 ^{[e]}	Fifth	"The Lunar Strangers" (issues 215–217)	Story Gareth Roberts; art Martin Geraghty	130	26	July 2018	ISBN 978-1846538865
Land of the Blind; Multi-Doctor Volume 1 ^{[e]}	First	"Food For Thought" (issues 218–220)	Story Nicholas Briggs; art Colin Andrew	130	26	July 2018	ISBN 978-1846538865
Land of the Blind; Multi-Doctor Volume 1 ^{[e]}	Third	"Change of Mind" (issues 221–223)	Story Kate Orman; art Barrie Mitchell	130	26	July 2018	ISBN 978-1846538865
Land of the Blind; Multi-Doctor Volume 1 ^{[e]}	Second	"Land of the Blind" (issues 224–226)	Story Scott Gray; art Lee Sullivan	130	26	July 2018	ISBN 978-1846538865
Land of the Blind; Multi-Doctor Volume 1 ^{[e]}	Second	"Bringer of Darkness" (Doctor Who Magazine Summer Special 1993)	Story Scott Gray; art Martin Geraghty	130	26	July 2018	ISBN 978-1846538865
Ground Zero; Multi-Doctor Volume 3 ^{[e]}	Fifth	"Curse of the Scarab" (issues 228–230)	Story Alan Barnes; art Martin Geraghty	130	29	December 2019	ISBN 978-1846539916
Ground Zero; Multi-Doctor Volume 3 ^{[e]}	First	"Operation Proteus" (issues 231–233)	Story Gareth Roberts; art Martin Geraghty	130	29	December 2019	ISBN 978-1846539916
Ground Zero; Multi-Doctor Volume 3 ^{[e]}	Third	"Target Practice" (issue 234)	Story Gareth Roberts; art Adrian Salmon	130	29	December 2019	ISBN 978-1846539916
Ground Zero; Multi-Doctor Volume 3 ^{[e]}	Fourth	"Black Destiny" (issues 235–237)	Story Gary Russell; art Martin Geraghty	130	29	December 2019	ISBN 978-1846539916
Ground Zero; Multi-Doctor Volume 3 ^{[e]}	Seventh	"Ground Zero" (issues 238–242)	Story Scott Gray; art Martin Geraghty	130	29	December 2019	ISBN 978-1846539916
Ground Zero; Multi-Doctor Volume 3 ^{[e]}	Fourth	"The Fangs of Time" (issue 243)	Story & art Sean Longcroft	130	29	December 2019	ISBN 978-1846539916
End Game; The Complete Eighth Doctor Comic Strips Volume One	Eighth	"End Game" (issues 244–247)	Story Alan Barnes; pencils Martin Geraghty; inks Robin Smith/Robin Riggs	212	04	2005	ISBN 1-905239-09-2
End Game; The Complete Eighth Doctor Comic Strips Volume One	Eighth	"The Keep" (issues 248–249)	Story Alan Barnes; pencils Martin Geraghty; inks Robin Smith/Robin Riggs	212	04	2005	ISBN 1-905239-09-2
End Game; The Complete Eighth Doctor Comic Strips Volume One	Eighth	"Fire and Brimstone" (issues 251–255)	Story Alan Barnes; pencils Martin Geraghty; inks Robin Smith/Robin Riggs	212	04	2005	ISBN 1-905239-09-2
End Game; The Complete Eighth Doctor Comic Strips Volume One	Eighth	"Tooth and Claw" (issues 257–260)	Story Alan Barnes; art Martin Geraghty	212	04	2005	ISBN 1-905239-09-2
End Game; The Complete Eighth Doctor Comic Strips Volume One	Eighth	"The Final Chapter" (issues 262–265)	Story Alan Barnes; art Martin Geraghty	212	04	2005	ISBN 1-905239-09-2
End Game; The Complete Eighth Doctor Comic Strips Volume One	Eighth	"Wormwood" (issues 266–271)	Story Scott Gray; pencils Martin Geraghty; inks Robin Smith/Robin Riggs	212	04	2005	ISBN 1-905239-09-2
End Game; The Complete Eighth Doctor Comic Strips Volume One	Eighth	"A Life of Matter & Death" (issue 250)	Story & art Alan Barnes; art by Sean Longcroft	212	04	2005	ISBN 1-905239-09-2
End Game; The Complete Eighth Doctor Comic Strips Volume One	Eighth	"By Hook or By Crook" (issue 256)	Story Scott Gray; art Adrian Salmon	212	04	2005	ISBN 1-905239-09-2
The Glorious Dead; The Complete Eighth Doctor Comic Strips Volume Two	Eighth	"The Fallen" (issues 273–276)	Story Scott Gray; pencils Martin Geraghty; inks by Robin Smith	244	05	2006	ISBN 1-905239-44-0
The Glorious Dead; The Complete Eighth Doctor Comic Strips Volume Two	Doctorless	"Unnatural Born Killers" (issue 277)	Story and art Adrian Salmon	244	05	2006	ISBN 1-905239-44-0
The Glorious Dead; The Complete Eighth Doctor Comic Strips Volume Two	Eighth	"The Road to Hell" (issues 278–282)	Story Scott Gray; pencils Martin Geraghty; inks Robin Smith (1–3) Fareed Choudhury (4–5)	244	05	2006	ISBN 1-905239-44-0
The Glorious Dead; The Complete Eighth Doctor Comic Strips Volume Two	Eighth	"The Company of Thieves" (issues 284–286)	Story Scott Gray; pencils Adrian Salmon; inks Fareed Choudhury	244	05	2006	ISBN 1-905239-44-0
The Glorious Dead; The Complete Eighth Doctor Comic Strips Volume Two	Eighth	"The Glorious Dead" (issues 287–296)	Story Scott Gray; pencils Martin Geraghty and Roger Langridge (5 only); inks Robin Smith	244	05	2006	ISBN 1-905239-44-0
The Glorious Dead; The Complete Eighth Doctor Comic Strips Volume Two	Eighth	"The Autonomy Bug" (issues 297–299)	Story Scott Gray; art Roger Langridge	244	05	2006	ISBN 1-905239-44-0
The Glorious Dead; The Complete Eighth Doctor Comic Strips Volume Two	Eighth	"Happy Deathday" (issue 272)	Story Scott Gray; art Roger Langridge	244	05	2006	ISBN 1-905239-44-0
The Glorious Dead; The Complete Eighth Doctor Comic Strips Volume Two	Eighth	"TV Action!" (issue 283)	Story Alan Barnes; art Roger Langridge	244	05	2006	ISBN 1-905239-44-0
The Glorious Dead; The Complete Eighth Doctor Comic Strips Volume Two	Doctorless	"Throwback: The Soul of a Cyberman" (issues 5–7)	Story Steve Moore; art Steve Dillon	244	05	2006	ISBN 1-905239-44-0
The Glorious Dead; The Complete Eighth Doctor Comic Strips Volume Two	Doctorless	"Ship of Fools" (issues 23–24)	Story Steve Moore; art Steve Dillon	244	05	2006	ISBN 1-905239-44-0
Oblivion; The Complete Eighth Doctor Comic Strips Volume Three	Eighth	"Ophidius" (issues 300–303)	Story Scott Gray; pencils Martin Geraghty; inks Robin Smith	228	06	2006	ISBN 1-905239-45-9
Oblivion; The Complete Eighth Doctor Comic Strips Volume Three	Eighth	"Beautiful Freak" (issue 304)	Story Scott Gray; pencils Martin Geraghty; inks Robin Smith	228	06	2006	ISBN 1-905239-45-9
Oblivion; The Complete Eighth Doctor Comic Strips Volume Three	Eighth	"The Way of All Flesh" (issues 306 and 308–310) ^{[f]}	Story Scott Gray; pencils Martin Geraghty; inks Robin Smith	228	06	2006	ISBN 1-905239-45-9
Oblivion; The Complete Eighth Doctor Comic Strips Volume Three	Eighth	"Children of the Revolution" (issues 312–317)	Story Scott Gray; art Lee Sullivan; colours Adrian Salmon	228	06	2006	ISBN 1-905239-45-9
Oblivion; The Complete Eighth Doctor Comic Strips Volume Three	Doctorless	"Me and My Shadow" (issue 318)	Story Scott Gray; art John Ross; colours Roger Langridge	228	06	2006	ISBN 1-905239-45-9
Oblivion; The Complete Eighth Doctor Comic Strips Volume Three	Eighth	"Uroborus" (issues 319–322)	Story Scott Gray; art John Ross; colours Adrian Salmon	228	06	2006	ISBN 1-905239-45-9
Oblivion; The Complete Eighth Doctor Comic Strips Volume Three	Eighth	"Oblivion" (issues 323–328)	Story Scott Gray; pencils Martin Geraghty; inks David R. Roach; colours Adrian Salmon	228	06	2006	ISBN 1-905239-45-9
Oblivion; The Complete Eighth Doctor Comic Strips Volume Three	Doctorless	"Character Assassin" (issue 311)	Story Scott Gray; art Adrian Salmon	228	06	2006	ISBN 1-905239-45-9
The Flood; The Complete Eighth Doctor Comic Strips Volume Four	Eighth	"Where Nobody Knows Your Name" (issue 329)	Story Scott Gray; pencils & colour Roger Langridge; inks David R. Roach	228	07	2007	ISBN 978-1-905239-65-8
The Flood; The Complete Eighth Doctor Comic Strips Volume Four	Eighth	"The Nightmare Game" (issues 330–332)	Story Gareth Roberts; pencils Mike Collins; inks Robin Smith: colours Dylan Teague	228	07	2007	ISBN 978-1-905239-65-8
The Flood; The Complete Eighth Doctor Comic Strips Volume Four	Eighth	"The Power of Thoueris!" (issue 333)	Story Scott Gray; art & colours Adrian Salmon	228	07	2007	ISBN 978-1-905239-65-8
The Flood; The Complete Eighth Doctor Comic Strips Volume Four	Eighth	"The Curious Tale of Spring-Heeled Jack" (issues 334–336)	Story Scott Gray; pencils Anthony Williams; inks David R. Roach; colours Adrian Salmon	228	07	2007	ISBN 978-1-905239-65-8
The Flood; The Complete Eighth Doctor Comic Strips Volume Four	Eighth	"The Land of Happy Endings" (issue 337)	Story Scott Gray; pencils Martin Geraghty; inks Faz Choudhury (1–6), David R. Roach (7); colours Daryl Joyce (1–6), Adrian Salmon (7)	228	07	2007	ISBN 978-1-905239-65-8
The Flood; The Complete Eighth Doctor Comic Strips Volume Four	Eighth	"Bad Blood" (issues 338–342)	Story Scott Gray; pencils Martin Geraghty; ink David R. Roach; colours Adrian Salmon	228	07	2007	ISBN 978-1-905239-65-8
The Flood; The Complete Eighth Doctor Comic Strips Volume Four	Eighth	"Sins of the Fathers" (issues 343–345)	Story Scott Gray; art John Ross; colours Adrian Salmon	228	07	2007	ISBN 978-1-905239-65-8
The Flood; The Complete Eighth Doctor Comic Strips Volume Four	Eighth	"The Flood" (issues 346–353)	Story Scott Gray; pencils Martin Geraghty; ink David R. Roach; colours Adrian Salmon	228	07	2007	ISBN 978-1-905239-65-8
The Cruel Sea; Collected Ninth Doctor Comic Strips ^{[g]}	Ninth	"The Love Invasion" (issues 355–357)	Story Gareth Roberts/Clayton Hickman; script Gareth Roberts; pencils Mike Collins; inks David A. Roach; colours Dylan Teague	132	18	May 2014	ISBN 978-1-84653-593-2
The Cruel Sea; Collected Ninth Doctor Comic Strips ^{[g]}	Ninth	"Art Attack" (issue 358)	Story & pencils Mike Collins; ink Kris Justice; colours Dylan Teague	132	18	May 2014	ISBN 978-1-84653-593-2
The Cruel Sea; Collected Ninth Doctor Comic Strips ^{[g]}	Ninth	"The Cruel Sea" (issues 359–362)	Story Robert Shearman; pencils Mike Collins; ink David A. Roach; colours James Offredi	132	18	May 2014	ISBN 978-1-84653-593-2
The Cruel Sea; Collected Ninth Doctor Comic Strips ^{[g]}	Ninth	"Mr Nobody" (Doctor Who Annual 2006)	Story Scott Gray; art John Ross; colours James Offredi	132	18	May 2014	ISBN 978-1-84653-593-2
The Cruel Sea; Collected Ninth Doctor Comic Strips ^{[g]}	Ninth	"A Groatsworth of Wit" (issues 363–364)	Story Gareth Roberts; pencils Mike Collins; ink David A. Roach; colours James Offredi	132	18	May 2014	ISBN 978-1-84653-593-2
The Betrothal of Sontar; Collected Tenth Doctor Comic Strips Volume 1	Tenth	"The Betrothal of Sontar" (issues 365–367)	Story John Tomlinson/Nick Abadzis; pencils Mike Collins; ink David A. Roach; colours James Offredi	180	10	2008	ISBN 978-1-905239-90-0
The Betrothal of Sontar; Collected Tenth Doctor Comic Strips Volume 1	Tenth	"The Lodger" (issue 368)	Story Gareth Roberts; pencils Mike Collins; ink David A. Roach; colours James Offredi	180	10	2008	ISBN 978-1-905239-90-0
The Betrothal of Sontar; Collected Tenth Doctor Comic Strips Volume 1	Tenth	"F.A.Q." (issues 369–371)	Story Tony Lee; pencils Mike Collins; ink David A. Roach; colours James Offredi	180	10	2008	ISBN 978-1-905239-90-0
The Betrothal of Sontar; Collected Tenth Doctor Comic Strips Volume 1	Tenth	"The Futurists" (issues 372–374)	Story & art Mike Collins; ink David A. Roach; colours James Offredi	180	10	2008	ISBN 978-1-905239-90-0
The Betrothal of Sontar; Collected Tenth Doctor Comic Strips Volume 1	Tenth	"Interstellar Overdrive" (issues 375–376)	Story Jonathan Morris; pencils Mike Collins; ink David A. Roach; colours James Offredi	180	10	2008	ISBN 978-1-905239-90-0
The Betrothal of Sontar; Collected Tenth Doctor Comic Strips Volume 1	Tenth	"Opera of Doom!" (Doctor Who Storybook 2007)	Story Jonathan Morris; pencils Martin Geraghty; ink David A. Roach; colours James Offredi	180	10	2008	ISBN 978-1-905239-90-0
The Betrothal of Sontar; Collected Tenth Doctor Comic Strips Volume 1	Tenth	"The Green-Eyed Monster" (issues 377)	Story Nev Fountain; art Roger Langridge; colours James Offredi	180	10	2008	ISBN 978-1-905239-90-0
The Betrothal of Sontar; Collected Tenth Doctor Comic Strips Volume 1	Tenth	"The Warkeeper's Crown" (issues 378–380)	Story Alan Barnes; pencils Martin Geraghty; ink David A. Roach; colours James Offredi	180	10	2008	ISBN 978-1-905239-90-0
The Widow's Curse; Collected Tenth Doctor Comic Strips Volume 2	Tenth	"The Woman Who Sold The World" (issues 381–384)	Story Rob Davis; pencils Mike Collins; ink David A. Roach; colours James Offredi	220	12	2009	ISBN 978-1-84653-429-4
The Widow's Curse; Collected Tenth Doctor Comic Strips Volume 2	Tenth	"Bus Stop!" (issue 385)	Story Rob Davis; pencils John Ross; ink David A. Roach; colours James Offredi	220	12	2009	ISBN 978-1-84653-429-4
The Widow's Curse; Collected Tenth Doctor Comic Strips Volume 2	Tenth	"First" (issues 386–389)	Story Dan McDaid; pencils Martin Geraghty; ink David A. Roach; colours James Offredi	220	12	2009	ISBN 978-1-84653-429-4
The Widow's Curse; Collected Tenth Doctor Comic Strips Volume 2	Tenth	"Sun Screen" (Doctor Who Storybook 2008)	Story Jonathan Morris; pencils Martin Geraghty; ink David A. Roach; colours James Offredi	220	12	2009	ISBN 978-1-84653-429-4
The Widow's Curse; Collected Tenth Doctor Comic Strips Volume 2	Tenth	"Death to the Doctor!" (issue 390)	Story Jonathan Morris; art Roger Langridge; colours James Offredi	220	12	2009	ISBN 978-1-84653-429-4
The Widow's Curse; Collected Tenth Doctor Comic Strips Volume 2	Tenth	"Universal Monsters" (issues 391–393)	Story Ian Edginton; art Adrian Salmon	220	12	2009	ISBN 978-1-84653-429-4
The Widow's Curse; Collected Tenth Doctor Comic Strips Volume 2	Tenth	"The Widow's Curse" (issues 395–398)	Story Rob Davis; pencils Martin Geraghty; ink David A. Roach; colours James Offredi	220	12	2009	ISBN 978-1-84653-429-4
The Widow's Curse; Collected Tenth Doctor Comic Strips Volume 2	Tenth	"The Immortal Emperor" (Doctor Who Storybook 2009)	Story Jonathan Morris; art Rob Davis; colours Rob Davis & Geraint Ford	220	12	2009	ISBN 978-1-84653-429-4
The Widow's Curse; Collected Tenth Doctor Comic Strips Volume 2	Tenth	"The Time of My Life" (issue 399)	Story Jonathan Morris; art Rob Davis; colours Geraint Ford	220	12	2009	ISBN 978-1-84653-429-4
The Crimson Hand; Collected Tenth Doctor Comic Strips Volume 3	Tenth	"Hotel Historia" (issue 394)	Story and art Dan McDaid	260	13	May 2012	ISBN 978-1-84653-451-5
The Crimson Hand; Collected Tenth Doctor Comic Strips Volume 3	Tenth	"Space Vikings!" (Doctor Who Storybook 2010)	Story Jonathan Morris; art Rob Davis & I. N. J. Culbard	260	13	May 2012	ISBN 978-1-84653-451-5
The Crimson Hand; Collected Tenth Doctor Comic Strips Volume 3	Tenth	"Thinktwice" (issues 400–402)	Story Dan McDaid; pencils Martin Geraghty; ink David A. Roach; colours James Offredi	260	13	May 2012	ISBN 978-1-84653-451-5
The Crimson Hand; Collected Tenth Doctor Comic Strips Volume 3	Tenth	"The Stockbridge Child" (issues 403–405)	Story Dan McDaid; pencils Mike Collins; ink David A. Roach; colours James Offredi	260	13	May 2012	ISBN 978-1-84653-451-5
The Crimson Hand; Collected Tenth Doctor Comic Strips Volume 3	Tenth	"Mortal Beloved" (issues 406–407)	Story Dan McDaid; art Sean Longcroft (406–407); colours James Offredi	260	13	May 2012	ISBN 978-1-84653-451-5
The Crimson Hand; Collected Tenth Doctor Comic Strips Volume 3	Tenth	"The Age of Ice" (issues 408–411)	Story Dan McDaid; pencils Martin Geraghty; ink David A. Roach; colours James Offredi	260	13	May 2012	ISBN 978-1-84653-451-5
The Crimson Hand; Collected Tenth Doctor Comic Strips Volume 3	Tenth	"The Deep Hereafter" (issue 412)	Story Dan McDaid; art Rob Davis; colours James Offredi & Rob Davis	260	13	May 2012	ISBN 978-1-84653-451-5
The Crimson Hand; Collected Tenth Doctor Comic Strips Volume 3	Tenth	"Onomatopoeia" (issue 413)	Story Dan McDaid; pencils Mike Collins; ink David A. Roach; colours James Offredi	260	13	May 2012	ISBN 978-1-84653-451-5
The Crimson Hand; Collected Tenth Doctor Comic Strips Volume 3	Tenth	"Ghosts of the Northern Line" (issues 414–415)	Story Dan McDaid; art Paul Grist; colours James Offredi	260	13	May 2012	ISBN 978-1-84653-451-5
The Crimson Hand; Collected Tenth Doctor Comic Strips Volume 3	Tenth	"The Crimson Hand" (issues 416–420)	Story Dan McDaid; pencils Martin Geraghty; ink David A. Roach; colours James Offredi	260	13	May 2012	ISBN 978-1-84653-451-5
The Child of Time; Collected Eleventh Doctor Comic Strips Volume 1	Eleventh	"Supernature" (issues 421–423)	Story Jonathan Morris; pencils Mike Collins; ink David A. Roach; colours James Offredi	244	14	October 2012	ISBN 978-1-84653-460-7
The Child of Time; Collected Eleventh Doctor Comic Strips Volume 1	Eleventh	"Planet Bollywood!" (issue 424)	Story Jonathan Morris; art Roger Langridge; colours James Offredi	244	14	October 2012	ISBN 978-1-84653-460-7
The Child of Time; Collected Eleventh Doctor Comic Strips Volume 1	Eleventh	"The Golden Ones" (issues 425–428)	Story Jonathan Morris; pencils Martin Geraghty; ink David A. Roach; colours James Offredi	244	14	October 2012	ISBN 978-1-84653-460-7
The Child of Time; Collected Eleventh Doctor Comic Strips Volume 1	Eleventh	"The Professor, the Queen and the Bookshop" (issue 429)	Story Jonathan Morris; art Rob Davis; colours Geraint Ford	244	14	October 2012	ISBN 978-1-84653-460-7
The Child of Time; Collected Eleventh Doctor Comic Strips Volume 1	Eleventh	"The Screams of Death" (issues 430–431)	Story Jonathan Morris; art Dan McDaid; colours James Offredi	244	14	October 2012	ISBN 978-1-84653-460-7
The Child of Time; Collected Eleventh Doctor Comic Strips Volume 1	Eleventh	"Do Not Go Gentle into that Good Night" (issue 432)	Story Jonathan Morris; art David A. Roach; colours James Offredi	244	14	October 2012	ISBN 978-1-84653-460-7
The Child of Time; Collected Eleventh Doctor Comic Strips Volume 1	Eleventh	"Forever Dreaming" (issues 433–434)	Story Jonathan Morris; art Adrian Salmon	244	14	October 2012	ISBN 978-1-84653-460-7
The Child of Time; Collected Eleventh Doctor Comic Strips Volume 1	Eleventh	"Apotheosis" (issues 435–437)	Story Jonathan Morris; art Dan McDaid; colours James Offredi	244	14	October 2012	ISBN 978-1-84653-460-7
The Child of Time; Collected Eleventh Doctor Comic Strips Volume 1	Eleventh	"The Child of Time" (issues 438–441)	Story Jonathan Morris; pencils Martin Geraghty; ink David A. Roach; colours James Offredi	244	14	October 2012	ISBN 978-1-84653-460-7
The Chains of Olympus; Collected Eleventh Doctor Comic Strips Volume 2	Eleventh	"The Chains of Olympus" (issues 442–445)	Story Scott Gray; pencils Mike Collins; inks by David A. Roach; colours James Offredi	132	16	October 2013	ISBN 978-1-84653-558-1
The Chains of Olympus; Collected Eleventh Doctor Comic Strips Volume 2	Eleventh	"Sticks & Stones" (issues 446–447)	Story Scott Gray; pencils Martin Geraghty; inks by David A. Roach; colours James Offredi	132	16	October 2013	ISBN 978-1-84653-558-1
The Chains of Olympus; Collected Eleventh Doctor Comic Strips Volume 2	Eleventh	"The Cornucopia Caper" (issues 448–450)	Written by Scott Gray; art by Dan McDaid; colours James Offredi	132	16	October 2013	ISBN 978-1-84653-558-1
Hunters of the Burning Stone; Collected Eleventh Doctor Comic Strips Volume 3	Eleventh	"The Broken Man" (issues 451–454)	Story Scott Gray; pencils Martin Geraghty; inks by David A. Roach; colours James Offredi	164	17	October 2013	ISBN 978-1-84653-545-1
Hunters of the Burning Stone; Collected Eleventh Doctor Comic Strips Volume 3	Doctorless	"Imaginary Enemies" (issue 455)	Story Scott Gray; pencils Mike Collins; inks by David A. Roach; colours James Offredi	164	17	October 2013	ISBN 978-1-84653-545-1
Hunters of the Burning Stone; Collected Eleventh Doctor Comic Strips Volume 3	Eleventh	"Hunters of the Burning Stone" (issues 456–461)	Story Scott Gray; pencils Martin Geraghty; inks by David A. Roach; colours James Offredi	164	17	October 2013	ISBN 978-1-84653-545-1
The Blood of Azrael; Collected Eleventh Doctor Comic Strips Volume 4	Eleventh	"A Wing and a Prayer" (issues 462–464)	Story Scott Gray; pencils Mike Collins; inks by David A. Roach; colours James Offredi	180	19	October 2014	ISBN 978-1-84653-625-0
The Blood of Azrael; Collected Eleventh Doctor Comic Strips Volume 4	Eleventh	"Welcome to Tickle Town" (issues 465–466)	Story Scott Gray; art by Adrian Salmon	180	19	October 2014	ISBN 978-1-84653-625-0
The Blood of Azrael; Collected Eleventh Doctor Comic Strips Volume 4	Eleventh	"John Smith and the Common Men" (issue 467)	Story Scott Gray; art David A. Roach (467); colours James Offredi	180	19	October 2014	ISBN 978-1-84653-625-0
The Blood of Azrael; Collected Eleventh Doctor Comic Strips Volume 4	Eleventh	"Pay the Piper" (issues 468–469)	Story Scott Gray; pencils Mike Collins; inks by David A. Roach; colours James Offredi	180	19	October 2014	ISBN 978-1-84653-625-0
The Blood of Azrael; Collected Eleventh Doctor Comic Strips Volume 4	Eleventh	"The Blood of Azrael" (issues 470–474)	Story Scott Gray; pencils Mike Collins; inks by David A. Roach; colours James Offredi	180	19	October 2014	ISBN 978-1-84653-625-0
The Eye of Torment; Collected Twelfth Doctor Comic Strips Volume 1	Twelfth	"The Eye of Torment" (issues 477–480)	Story Scott Gray; pencils Martin Geraghty; inks by David A. Roach; colours James Offredi	180	21	October 2015	ISBN 978-1-84653-673-1
The Eye of Torment; Collected Twelfth Doctor Comic Strips Volume 1	Twelfth	"The Instruments of War" (issues 481–483)	Story & art Mike Collins; inks by David A. Roach; colours James Offredi	180	21	October 2015	ISBN 978-1-84653-673-1
The Eye of Torment; Collected Twelfth Doctor Comic Strips Volume 1	Twelfth	"Blood and Ice" (issues 485–488)	Story Jacqueline Rayner; pencils Martin Geraghty; inks by David A. Roach; colours James Offredi	180	21	October 2015	ISBN 978-1-84653-673-1
The Eye of Torment; Collected Twelfth Doctor Comic Strips Volume 1	Doctorless	"The Crystal Throne" (issues 475–476)	Story Scott Gray; pencils Mike Collins; inks by David A. Roach; colours James Offredi	180	21	October 2015	ISBN 978-1-84653-673-1
The Highgate Horror; Collected Twelfth Doctor Comic Strips Volume 2	Twelfth	"Space Invaders!" (issue 484)	Story Mark Wright; pencils Mike Collins; inks by David A. Roach; colours James Offredi	180	23	October 2016	ISBN 978-1-84653-749-3
The Highgate Horror; Collected Twelfth Doctor Comic Strips Volume 2	Twelfth	"Spirits of the Jungle" (issues 489–491)	Story Jonathan Morris; art John Ross; colours James Offredi	180	23	October 2016	ISBN 978-1-84653-749-3
The Highgate Horror; Collected Twelfth Doctor Comic Strips Volume 2	Twelfth	"The Highgate Horror" (issues 492–493)	Story Mark Wright; art David A. Roach; colours James Offredi	180	23	October 2016	ISBN 978-1-84653-749-3
The Highgate Horror; Collected Twelfth Doctor Comic Strips Volume 2	Twelfth	"The Dragon Lord" (issues 494–495)	Story Steve Lyons; art & colour Adrian Salmon	180	23	October 2016	ISBN 978-1-84653-749-3
The Highgate Horror; Collected Twelfth Doctor Comic Strips Volume 2	Twelfth	"The Theatre of the Mind" (issue 496)	Story & art Roger Langridge; colour Adrian Salmon	180	23	October 2016	ISBN 978-1-84653-749-3
The Highgate Horror; Collected Twelfth Doctor Comic Strips Volume 2	Twelfth	"Witch Hunt" (issues 497–499)	Story Jacqueline Rayner; pencils Martin Geraghty; inks by David A. Roach; colours James Offredi	180	23	October 2016	ISBN 978-1-84653-749-3
The Highgate Horror; Collected Twelfth Doctor Comic Strips Volume 2	Twelfth	"The Stockbridge Showdown" (issue 500)	Story Scott Gray (500); pencils Mike Collins, Martin Geraghty; inks David A. Roach; art John Ross; David A. Roach, Adrian Salmon, Roger Langridge, Dave Gibbons, Dan McDaid & John Ridgway	180	23	October 2016	ISBN 978-1-84653-749-3
Doorway to Hell; Collected Twelfth Doctor Comic Strips Volume 3	Twelfth	"The Pestilent Heart" (issues 501–503)	Story Mark Wright; pencils Mike Collins; inks by David A. Roach; colours James Offredi	148	25	September 2017	ISBN 978-1-84653-834-6
Doorway to Hell; Collected Twelfth Doctor Comic Strips Volume 3	Twelfth	"Moving In" (issue 504)	Story Mark Wright; art John Ross; colours James Offredi	148	25	September 2017	ISBN 978-1-84653-834-6
Doorway to Hell; Collected Twelfth Doctor Comic Strips Volume 3	Twelfth	"Bloodsport" (issues 505–506)	Story Mark Wright; art Staz Johnson; inks (pgs 6–8 & 10) David A. Roach; colours James Offredi	148	25	September 2017	ISBN 978-1-84653-834-6
Doorway to Hell; Collected Twelfth Doctor Comic Strips Volume 3	Twelfth	"Be Forgot" (issue 507)	Story Mark Wright; layout and ink David A. Roach; pencils Mike Collins; colours James Offredi	148	25	September 2017	ISBN 978-1-84653-834-6
Doorway to Hell; Collected Twelfth Doctor Comic Strips Volume 3	Twelfth	"Doorway to Hell" (issues 508–511)	Story Mark Wright; art Staz Johnson; inks (pgs 6–8 & 10) David A. Roach; colours James Offredi	148	25	September 2017	ISBN 978-1-84653-834-6
The Phantom Piper; Collected Twelfth Doctor Comic Strips Volume 4	Twelfth	"The Soul Garden" (issues 512–514)	Story Scott Gray; pencils Martin Geraghty; inks by David A. Roach; colours James Offredi	148	27	November 2018	ISBN 978-1-84653-926-8
The Phantom Piper; Collected Twelfth Doctor Comic Strips Volume 4	Twelfth	"The Parliament of Fear" (issues 515–517)	Story Scott Gray; art Staz Johnson; inks (pgs 6–8 & 10) David A. Roach; colours James Offredi	148	27	November 2018	ISBN 978-1-84653-926-8
The Phantom Piper; Collected Twelfth Doctor Comic Strips Volume 4	Twelfth	"Matildus" (issue 518)	Story Scott Gray; colours James Offredi	148	27	November 2018	ISBN 978-1-84653-926-8
The Phantom Piper; Collected Twelfth Doctor Comic Strips Volume 4	Twelfth	"The Phantom Piper" (issues 519–523)	Story Scott Gray; pencils Martin Geraghty; inks by David A. Roach; colours Roger Langridge	148	27	November 2018	ISBN 978-1-84653-926-8
The Clockwise War; Multi-Doctor Volume 2	Twelfth	"The Clockwise War" (issues 524–530)	Story Scott Gray; art John Ross	156	28	May 2019	ISBN 978-1-84653-969-5
The Clockwise War; Multi-Doctor Volume 2	Doctorless	"The Cybermen" Saga (issues 215–238, 504): The Dead Heart (215–20); The Flesh Unbound (221–3); The Black Sky (224–6); The Hungry Sea (227–9); The Dark Flame (230–3); The Future Perfect (234); The Ugly Underneath (235–8); The Prodigal Returns [I/II] (504)	Story Alan Barnes; Adrian Salmon	156	28	May 2019	ISBN 978-1-84653-969-5
The Clockwise War; Multi-Doctor Volume 2	First; Seventh	"A Religious Experience" (DW Yearbook 1994)	Story Tim Quinn; art John Ridgway	156	28	May 2019	ISBN 978-1-84653-969-5
The Clockwise War; Multi-Doctor Volume 2	Fourth	"Rest & Re-Creation" (DW Yearbook 1994)	Story Scott Gray; art Charlie Adlard	156	28	May 2019	ISBN 978-1-84653-969-5
The Clockwise War; Multi-Doctor Volume 2	Fourth	"The Naked Flame" (DW Yearbook 1995)	Story Scott Gray; art Charlie Adlard	156	28	May 2019	ISBN 978-1-84653-969-5
The Clockwise War; Multi-Doctor Volume 2	Fifth	"Blood Invocation" (DW Yearbook 1995)	Story Paul Cornell; art John Ridgway	156	28	May 2019	ISBN 978-1-84653-969-5
The Clockwise War; Multi-Doctor Volume 2	Fourth	"Star Beast II" (DW Yearbook 1996)	Story Gary Gillatt; art Martin Geraghty	156	28	May 2019	ISBN 978-1-84653-969-5
The Clockwise War; Multi-Doctor Volume 2	Fourth	"Junkyard Demon II" (DW Yearbook 1996)	Story Alan Barnes; art Adrian Salmon	156	28	May 2019	ISBN 978-1-84653-969-5
Mistress of Chaos	Thirteenth	TBC.	TBC	TBC	30	TBC 2020	TBC
Notes: a Issue 85 featured the story "Skywatch-7" [Part 1] (a Doctorless / Unit story) as the main strip. This was a reprint of a secondary strip from DWM issue 58, as there were problems delivering part 2 of "The Moderator".; b A parallel Seventh Doctor comic strip ran in the short-lived The Incredible Hulk Presents publication between 7 October – 23 December 1989. The second two part story "Hunger from the Ends of Time!" (issues 2–3) was reprinted in Doctor Who Magazine issues 157–158.; c "Abslom Daak... Dalek Killer" and "Star Tigers" [I] and [II] were Doctorless comic strips starring Abslom Daak. The first story "Abslom Daak... Dalek Killer" was a 4 part secondary strip in Doctor Who Weekly issues 17 – 20. "Star Tigers" [I] was also a 4 part secondary strip in Doctor Who Weekly issues 27 – 30; while "Star Tigers" [II] was a 3 part secondary strip beginning in the first instance of the newly rebooted magazine, Doctor Who A Marvel Monthly, issues 44 – 46.; d Due to production problems "Evening's Empire" only had the first episode published in Doctor Who Magazine (issue 180). Accordingly, issues 181 and 182 (December 1991 and January 1992) featured reprints: a Doctorless secondary strip "The Fires Down Below" (originally DWM issue 64); and a Fourth Doctor strip "Spider-God (originally DWM issue 52). Issue 183 featured a new Doctorless strip: "Conflict of Interests". "Evening's Empire" was finally completed, but was never published in DWM as a main strip. It eventually was completed in Doctor Who Classic Comics – Autumn Holiday Special 1993; the whole story appears in this Collected Edition – with some pages redrawn.; e Part of the magazine's 'past Doctors' period.; f Issue 307 was a reprint of the comic strip "Flower Power", a Second Doctor story from TV Comic.; g Due to its comparatively short run, the Ninth Doctor comic strips collection was first published as a magazine format Special Edition (issue 13, above in the Special Edition section).

== See also ==
- List of Doctor Who comic stories
- First Doctor comic stories
- Second Doctor comic stories
- Third Doctor comic stories
- Fourth Doctor comic strips
- Fifth Doctor comic stories
- Sixth Doctor comic stories
- Eighth Doctor comic stories
- Ninth Doctor comic stories
- Tenth Doctor comic stories
- Eleventh Doctor comic stories
- Twelfth Doctor comic stories
- Doctor Who Adventures
- Doctor Who – Battles in Time
- Torchwood Magazine
- Dreamwatch
- Category:Doctor Who comic strip characters
