= Doctor Who Polystyle comic strip =

Doctor Who
- Illustrator(s): Neville Main, Bill Mevin, John Canning
- Current status/schedule: Concluded
- Launch date: 14 November 1964
- End date: 11 May 1979
- Publisher(s): TV Comic (1964–1971); Countdown (1971–1973); TV Comic (1973–1979)
- Genre: Science fiction

The Doctor Who Polystyle comic strip was the first comic strip devoted to the long-running British science fiction television series Doctor Who, and the first original spin-off media from the show. The strip was launched in TV Comic on 14 November 1964, less than a year after the television series began broadcasting. TV Comic was issued weekly, and one of a number of titles belonging to Polystyle Publications Ltd, the comic exclusively featuring strips based on television series.

In 1971, the Doctor Who strip moved to another Polystyle publication, Countdown comic, for its launch. Countdown soon began amalgamating other Polystyle comics and went through a number of renamings, before in turn being amalgamated into TV Comic in 1973 (itself then going through a number of name changes). The Doctor Who comic strip survived all the changes and ran for 15 years in nearly every issue mainly in episodic format, with the last instalment appearing on 11 May 1979.

During this time, the strip also featured in various Polystyle produced holiday specials, annuals, and giveaways. Accordingly, this period has become known as the 'Polystyle era'.

== History ==
TV Comic was a British comic book magazine published weekly from 9 November 1951 until 29 June 1984. It was originally published by News of the World before "passing in turn to Beaverbrook Newspapers, [then] TV Publications," which changed its name to Polystyle Publications Ltd in March 1968. From the off, the comic featured stories based on television series running at the time of publication. The first issue ran to eight pages and had Muffin the Mule on the front cover. It also featured many other TV favorites of the day, including Mr. Pastry, Larry the Lamb, Tom Puss, Prince Valiant (Hal Foster reprint), Jack & Jill and Prudence Kitten.

The Doctor Who comic strip began in issue 674 of TV Comic, which went on sale on Monday 8 November 1964, with a cover date of 14 November 1964. It featured a story with the First Doctor titled "The Klepton Parasites". Mirroring the television series, the First Doctor was a likeness of actor William Hartnell. However, the character was known as "Dr. Who", and traveled with his grandchildren John and Gillian, who had never appeared in televised Doctor Who.

== Polystyle comics ==
| Title | Issues | Date | Doctor(s) |
| TV Comic | #674-999 | 1964-1971 | First Doctor; Second Doctor; Third Doctor |
| Countdown | #1-39 | 1971 | Third Doctor |
| Countdown for TV Action | #40-56 | 1971-1972 | Third Doctor |
| TV Action in Countdown | #57-58 | 1972 | Third Doctor |
| TV Action + Countdown | #59-100 | 1972-1973 | Third Doctor |
| TV Action | #101-131 | 1973 | Third Doctor |
| TV Comic + TV Action | #1133-1147 | 1973 | Third Doctor |
| TV Comic | #1148-1181 | 1973-1974 | Third Doctor |
| TV Comic plus Tom & Jerry Weekly | #1182-1201 | 1974 | Third Doctor |
| TV Comic | #1202-1291 | 1974-1976 | Third Doctor; Fourth Doctor |
| Mighty TV Comic | #1292-1352 | 1976-1977 | Fourth Doctor |
| TV Comic | #1353-1392 | 1977-1978 | Fourth Doctor |
| TV Comic with Target | #1393-1401 | 1978 | Fourth Doctor |
| TV Comic | #1402-1430 | 1978-1979 | Fourth Doctor |

== Polystyle parallel publications ==
The Doctor Who strip also appeared in a number of Polystyle holiday specials, annuals, and giveaways:

- TV Comic Holiday Special [1965]
- TV Comic Annual 1966
- TV Comic Holiday Special [1966]
- TV Comic Annual 1967
- TV Comic Holiday Special [1967]
- TV Comic Annual 1968
- TV Comic Holiday Special [1968]
- TV Comic Annual 1969
- TV Comic Holiday Special [1969]
- TV Comic Annual 1970
- TV Comic Holiday Special [1970]
- TV Comic Annual 1971
- Countdown Annual 1972
- Countdown for TV Action Annual 1973
- Doctor Who Holiday Special [1973]
- TV Action Annual 1974
- TV Comic Annual 1975
- Doctor Who Holiday Special
- TV Comic Annual 1976
- TV Comic Annual 1977
- Mighty Midget Doctor Who Comic (Free with Issue 1292 of Mighty TV Comic)
- Mighty TV Comic Holiday Special 1977
- Mighty TV Comic Annual 1978
- Doctor Who Winter Special [1977]
- TV Comic Holiday Special 1978
- TV Comic Annual 1979

== Content ==
=== First Doctor Polystyle strips ===
The first artist to portray the Doctor in TV Comic was Neville Main. These strips appeared over two pages, and were in black and white. According to Doctor Who historian Jeremy Bentham, "Main's artwork was very simplistic in style, consisting of basic line illustrations drawn in a very cartoonish way. During his 45-week stint on the strip he never quite captured the likeness of Hartnell [...] He was, however, quite an inventive storywriter." After about a year, Bill Mevin took over the strip, which now began to appear in full colour. After six months with Mevin at the helm, the strip passed to John Canning, at which point the strip returned to black and white.

- First Doctor Polystyle strips

=== Second Doctor Polystyle strips ===
The first strip to feature the Second Doctor, Patrick Troughton, came with TV Comic issue 784 (24 December 1966). "No reason whatsoever," writes Jeremy Bentham, "was given for his sudden change of appearance." The artist continued to be John Canning.

- Second Doctor Polystyle strips

=== Third Doctor Polystyle strips ===
After nine stories in TV Comic, the Doctor Who strip ceased in this publication. As Jeremy Bentham writes, however, this was because "it had found a much better home to go to." Polystyle launched Countdown with a rebooted Doctor Who strip, now in full colour on glossy paper. As John Ainsworth writes that the new strip "was a complete departure from the TV Comic version." This was due to the high standard of writing and illustration, as much as the production values. However, within a year Polystyle found they could not sustain the quality of the publication as it was too costly, and so rebooted the publication as TV Action with a cheaper-to-produce format. However, TV Action also eventually proved too costly, and was wound up in August 1973. At that point, the strip returned to its original home, TV Comic.

- Third Doctor Polystyle strips

=== Fourth Doctor Polystyle strips ===
The Fourth Doctor comic strip launched in TV Comic in issue 1204 (11 January 1975). "As with the switch between Hartnell and Troughton," writes Jeremy Bentham, "there was no actual strip changeover story although this time the first panel of the Baker story 'Death Flower' contained a two- paragraph synopsis [...] introducing readers to the new Doctor."

- Fourth Doctor Polystyle strips

== End of Doctor Who strip ==
Paul Scoones, an historian of the Doctor Who comic strip, writes that Polystyle "held the rights to publish a Doctor Who comic [strip] until May 1979 when the last installment of the strip appeared [...] Once relinquished by Polystyle, the rights were soon snapped up by Marvel UK, who created their own ongoing comic [strip]. This new strip [...] continues to this day" in Doctor Who Magazine.

== See also ==
- List of Doctor Who comic stories
- First Doctor comic stories
- Second Doctor comic stories
- Third Doctor comic stories
- Fourth Doctor comic strips
- Fifth Doctor comic stories
- Sixth Doctor comic stories
- Eighth Doctor comic stories
- Ninth Doctor comic stories
- Eleventh Doctor comic stories
- Twelfth Doctor comic stories
- Thirteenth Doctor comic stories
- Doctor Who Adventures
- Doctor Who – Battles in Time
- Torchwood Magazine
- Category:Doctor Who comic strip characters
