= List of Doctor Who comic stories =

Doctor Who comic stories are a range of comic strips featuring the offscreen adventures of the Doctor, the protagonist in the BBC science fiction television series Doctor Who.

== History ==
Comic strip adventures of the Doctor appeared almost from the beginning of the television series. The first phase has become known as the ‘Polystyle era’ (1964-1979) of Doctor Who comic strips. Paul Scoones, a historian of the Doctor Who comic strip, writes:

First launched in the pages of TV Comic in November 1964, the comic strip version of Doctor Who is just one year younger than the television series on which it is based. The strip appeared almost every week: first in TV Comic, then in Countdown and TV Action before returning to TV Comic. All these titles were produced by a company called Polystyle Publications (formerly TV Publications), which held the rights to publish a Doctor Who comic [strip] until May 1979 when the last installment of the strip appeared.

Both the First and Second Doctors were, for a time, shown travelling with two youngsters named John and Gillian who are identified as the Doctor's grandchildren. Their place within established continuity has challenged fans ever since, although attempts have been made to reconcile their existence in various spin-off fiction venues.

The regular Doctor Who Annuals from World Distributors published comics most years from the first annual until they ceased publication in 1985.

A comic strip also regularly appeared in the pages of Doctor Who Magazine. This began as a Marvel Comics publication under the name Doctor Who Weekly in 1979 (soon changing to Doctor Who Monthly), and the magazine continued to be published after the programme ceased production in 1989. The comic strip has usually featured the current Doctor in a series of adventures independent of the novels and the audios, and with another companion, though several crossovers with the worlds of the audio and literary Doctor Who and the comics have occurred. Creators who have worked on the Doctor Who Magazine strip include such notables as writer Alan Moore and artists Dave Gibbons, Mike McMahon, and John Ridgway. Selected stories were reprinted in North America by Marvel Comics, which was also the publisher of Doctor Who Magazine at the time. Marvel Premiere #57 (December 1980) was the first Doctor Who comic published in North America. When Doctor Who Magazine was published by Marvel, some characters occasionally crossed over between the Doctor Who comic and other titles published by Marvel UK; these include the froglike Venusian businessman Josiah Dogbolter and the robotic bounty hunter Death's Head. In the "Flood Barriers" feature in the trade paperback Doctor Who: The Flood, it is revealed the comic strip was given the opportunity to show the regeneration of the Eighth Doctor into the Ninth Doctor.

The publishers of Doctor Who Magazine have also produced a number of special issues, annuals, and other publications containing comics.

Two short-lived spin-off series, Miranda from Comeuppance Comics and Faction Paradox from Mad Norwegian Press, have also appeared, both featuring characters who had debuted in Doctor Who novels.

Doctor Who Magazine, which is now owned by Panini Comics, continues to produce new comic-strip adventures. Panini has also begun to reprint the early Doctor Who Magazine strips in trade paperback format.

At the height of "Dalekmania" in the 1960s, a comic strip featuring the Daleks written by David Whitaker but credited to Terry Nation appeared in the Gerry Anderson TV Century 21 comic magazine. The BBC also published a number of Dalek annuals, written by Whitaker and Nation, that contained a mixture of comic strips and short stories. Although much of the material in these strips directly contradicted what would be shown on television, some concepts, such as the Daleks using humanoid duplicates and the design of the Dalek Emperor, were later adapted into the television programme. The strip also featured the Mechonoids seen in The Chase, and one annual featured Sara Kingdom and the Space Security Service.

In 2005 a webcomic called The Forge: Project Longinus, written by Cavan Scott and Mark Wright and illustrated by Bryan Coyle was produced as a spin-off from Scott and Wright's Big Finish Productions Doctor Who audio dramas, and contained a number of unofficial references to the Doctor Who universe.

== Stories ==
- First Doctor comic stories
- Second Doctor comic stories
- Third Doctor comic stories
- Fourth Doctor comic stories
- Fifth Doctor comic stories
- Sixth Doctor comic stories
- Seventh Doctor comic stories
- Eighth Doctor comic stories
- War Doctor comic stories
- Ninth Doctor comic stories
- Tenth Doctor comic stories
- Eleventh Doctor comic stories
- Twelfth Doctor comic stories
- Thirteenth Doctor comic stories
- Fourteenth Doctor comic stories
- Fifteenth Doctor comic stories
- Dalek comic strips, illustrated annuals and graphic novels

== See also ==
- Doctor Who spin-offs
- List of Doctor Who serials
- List of Torchwood comics
