= Tenth Doctor comic stories =

The Tenth Doctor comic stories is a wide range of adventures featuring the tenth incarnation of the Doctor, the Time Lord protagonist of the popular sci-fi series, Doctor Who. The range had the unprecedented claim of appearing in four regularly published titles: the long established Doctor Who Magazine, the more recently launched Doctor Who Adventures, aimed at a younger audience, the Doctor Who: Battles in Time magazine (a title used to support the sale of an expanding number of collectable trading cards that accompany the magazine or could be purchased separately), and Doctor Who, a US monthly title launched in 2009. In 2010, the comic stories passed onto the Eleventh Doctor.

== Comics ==
=== Doctor Who Magazine ===
No.	Title	Featuring	Written by	Release date
1	"The Betrothal of Sontar"	Rose Tyler, Sontarans	John Tomlison	1 February - 29 March 2006
The Doctor and Rose land on the icebound world of Serac where they encounter the Sontaran crew of the Betrothal of Sontar, a mining vessel commanded by Colonel Snathe, whose quest for the "Worldbane", a source of incredible power, has driven him insane. As the Doctor attempts to help Snathe find the Worldbane -- mainly in order to recover the lost TARDIS -- Rose befriends Lerox, an unusual Sontaran who possesses a conscience, and who holds the key to saving not only the Doctor and Rose, but the homeworld of Sontar itself.
2	"The Lodger"	Rose Tyler and Mickey Smith	Gareth Roberts	26 April 2006
Due to a mishap in the TARDIS, The Doctor is stranded on present-day Earth, whilst a trapped Rose drifts through the time vortex in the TARDIS. Trying to save her, the Doctor is forced to move in with Mickey, who is attempting to move on with his life by starting a relationship with a local girl called Gina. But as the Doctor turns Mickey's life upside down for the second time, the Time Lord remains unaware that an alien spaceship is approaching Earth, with plans to destroy it. Can the pair settle their differences to save the world - and Rose?
3	"F.A.Q"	Rose Tyler	Tony Lee	24 May - 19 July 2006
4	"The Futurists"	Rose Tyler	Mike Collins	16 August - 11 October 2006
5	"Interstellar Overdrive"	Rose Tyler	Jonathan Morris	8 November - 6 December 2006
6	"The Green-Eyed Monster"	Rose Tyler, Jackie Tyler and Mickey Smith	Nev Fountain	13 January 2007
7	"The Warkeeper's Crown"	Brigadier Lethbridge-Stewart	Alan Barnes	31 January - 28 March 2007
8	"The Women Who Sold The World"	Martha Jones	Rob Davis	2 May - 25 July 2007
9	"Bus Stop"	Martha Jones	Rob Davis	22 August 2007
10	"The First"	Martha Jones	Dan McDaid	19 September - 12 December 2007
11	"Death to the Doctor"	Martha Jones	Jonathan Morris	9 January 2008
12	"Universal Monsters"	Martha Jones	Ian Edginton	6 February - 2 April 2008
13	"Hotel Historia"	Majenta Pryce	Dan McDaid	30 April 2008
14	"The Widow's Curse"	Donna Noble, Sycorax	Rob Davis	28 May - 24 July 2008
15	"Time of My Life"	Donna Noble	Rob Davis	17 September 2008
16	"Thinktwice"	Majenta Pryce	Dan McDaid	15 October - 10 December 2008
17	"The Stockbridge Child"	Majenta Pryce, Maxwell Edison	Dan McDaid	7 January - 4 March 2009
18	"Mortal Beloved"	Majenta Pryce	Dan McDaid	1–29 April 2009
19	"The Age of Ice"	Majenta Pryce, UNIT	Dan McDaid	27 May - 19 August 2009
20	"The Deep Hereafter"	Majenta Pryce	Dan McDaid	16 September 2009
21	"Onomatopoeia"	Majenta Pryce	Dan McDaid	14 October 2009
22	"Ghosts of the Northern Line"	Majenta Pryce	Dan McDaid	11 November - 9 December 2009
23	"The Crimson Hand"	Majenta Pryce	Dan McDaid	6 January - 28 April 2010

=== Doctor Who Adventures ===
No.	Title	Featuring	Written by	Release date
1	"Which Switch?"	Rose Tyler	Michael Stevens	5 April 2006
After an accident in the TARDIS, the Doctor and Rose are reduced to the size of flies.
2	"Mirror Image"	Rose Tyler	Jacqueline Rayner	19 April - 2 May 2006
3	"Under the Volcano"	Rose Tyler	Si Spencer	3–16 May 2006
4	"The Germ War"	Rose Tyler	Alan Barnes	17–30 May 2006
5	"Warfreekz!"	Rose Tyler	Alan Barnes	31 May - 13 June 2006
6	"A Delicate Operation"	Rose Tyler	Si Spencer	14–27 June 2006
7	"Blood and Tears"	Rose Tyler	Si Spencer	28 June - 12 July 2006
8	"Fried Death"	Rose Tyler	Alan Barnes	13–26 July 2006
9	"Bizarre Zero"	Rose and Jackie Tyler	Stewart Sheargold	27 July - 9 August 2006
10	"Save the Humans!"	Rose Tyler	Alan Barnes	10–23 August 2006
11	"Bat Attack!"	Rose Tyler	Alan Barnes	24 August - 6 September 2006
12	"The Battle of Reading Gaol"	Rose Tyler	Alan Barnes	7–18 September 2006
13	"Triskaidkaphobia"	Rose Tyler	Alan Barnes	19 September - 2 October 2006
14	"Smart Bomb"	Rose Tyler	Alan Barnes	3–16 October 2006
15	"Pinball Wizard"	Rose Tyler	Davey Moore	17–31 October 2006
16	"Gangster's Paradise (Part 1 of 2)"	Rose Tyler	Alan Barnes	1–14 November 2006
17	"Heads You Lose (Part 2 of 2)"	Rose Tyler	Alan Barnes	15–28 November 2006
18	"A Date to Remember (Part 1 of 2)"	Rose Tyler	Davey Moore	29 November - 12 December 2006
19	"Snow Flakes (Part 2 of 2)"	Rose Tyler	Davey Moore	13 December 2006 - 2 January 2007
20	"The Hunters (Part 1 of 2)"	TBA	Trevor Baxendale	3–16 January 2007
21	"Cliffhanger! (Part 2 of 2)"	TBA	Trevor Baxendale	17–30 January 2007
22	"13 O'Clock"	TBA	Trevor Baxendale	31 January - 13 February 2007
24	"Green Fingers"	TBA	Mike Tucker	28 February - 14 March 2007
25	"The Snag Finders"	Bert, Jimmy and the Klytode	Trevor Baxendale	29 March - 11 April 2007
26	"The Skrawn Inheritance"	Martha Jones	Trevor Baxendale	26 April - 9 May 2007
27	"The Green, the Bad and the Ugly"	Martha Jones	Martin Day	24 May - 6 June 2007
28	"Minus Seven Wonders"	Martha Jones	Trevor Baxendale	21 June - 4 July 2007
29	"The Last Soldier"	Martha Jones	Martin Day	19 July - 1 August 2007
30	"Signs of Life"	Martha Jones, The Beatles	Trevor Baxendale	16–29 August 2007
31	"Shipwreck!"	Martha Jones	Trevor Baxendale	13–26 September 2007
32	"Cold War"	Martha Jones	Michael Michalowski	11–24 October 2007
33	"Waste Not"	Martha Jones	Trevor Baxendale	8–21 November 2007
34	"A Klytode Christmas"	Martha Jones, Bert and Jimmy, and the Klytode	Trevor Baxendale	6–12 December 2007
35	"The Monster Upstairs"	Violet Hopely	Trevor Baxendale	3–16 January 2008
36	"Hot Metal"	Ray Royce	Christopher Cooper	24–30 January 2008
37	"The Halls of Sacrifice"	TBA	Martin Day	7–13 February 2008
38	"The Old King of Scarab"	Mason Burns	Martin Day	21–27 February 2008
39	"Reign of the Stone Monkey"	Li	Christopher Cooper	6–12 March 2008
40	"Every Dog Has His Day"	TBA	Trevor Baxendale	20–26 March 2008
41	"The Poison Planet"	Rachel Barlow	TBA	3–16 April 2008
42	"Sea-Rah"	TBA	Trevor Baxendale	24 April 2008
43	"The Great Mordillo"	TBA	Trevor Baxendale	1 May 2008
44	"Nightmare on the Boulevard"	Donna Noble	Brendan Sheppard	8–14 May 2008
45	"Windswept"	Donna Noble	Christopher Cooper	22 May 2008
46	"The Continuity Cap"	Donna Noble	Christopher Cooper	29 May - 4 June 2008
47	"Wormhole"	Donna Noble	Trevor Baxendale	12–18 June 2008
48	"The Black Hole Gang"	Donna Noble	Christopher Cooper	26 June - 2 July 2008
49	"Citizen's Arrest"	Donna Noble	Christopher Cooper	10–16 July 2008
50	"The Lavender Hill Blob"	Donna Noble	Christopher Cooper	24–30 July 2008
51	"Shark Bait"	Donna Noble	Christopher Cooper	14 August 2008
52	"Attack of the Mange Mites"	Donna Noble	Martin Day	21–27 August 2008
53	"By Order of the Bone Menders"	Donna Noble	Martin Day	4–18 September 2008
54	"The Alice in Wonderland Kit"	Donna Noble	Martin Day	25 September 2008
55	"Washed Away"	Donna Noble	Michael Stevens	2–9 October 2008
56	"Titanoleum Tourists"	Donna Noble	Michael Stevens	16–23 October 2008
57	"The Man in the Moon"	Donna Noble	Nev Fountain	30 October - 6 November 2008
58	"Time Flies"	Donna Noble	Trevor Baxendale	13–27 November 2008
59	"The Giant's Ring"	Donna Noble	Jason Lobonk	4–11 December 2008
60	"Frosty The Snowman"	Donna Noble	Christopher Cooper	18 December 2008
61	"The Chrosome Connections"	Heather McCrimmon, The Mozhtratta	Christopher Cooper	2 January 2009
62	"The Aquarius Condition"	Heather McCrimmon	Trevor Baxendale	8 January 2009
63	"Glum Culture"	Heather McCrimmon	Christopher Cooper	16 January 2009
64	"The Great Rain Robbery"	Heather McCrimmon	Craig Donaghy	22 January 2009
65	"The Parrian Proposal"	Heather McCrimmon	Craig Donaghy	29 January 2009
66	"Hitching Point"	Heather McCrimmon	Christopher Cooper	5 February 2009
67	"Store Wars"	Heather McCrimmon	Nev Fountain	12 February 2009
68	"The Submariners"	Heather McCrimmon	Trevor Baxendale	19 February 2009
69	"The Greed of the Gavulav"	Heather McCrimmon	Christopher Cooper	26 February 2009
70	"The Secret Army"	Heather McCrimmon	Simon Gurrier	5 March 2009
71	"The Silver Bullet"	Heather McCrimmon	Michael Stevens	12 March 2009
72	"The Invisibles"	Heather McCrimmon	Trevor Baxendale	19 March 2009
73	"Good Old Days"	Heather McCrimmon	Simon Gurrier	26 March 2009
74	"The Abomination Game"	Heather McCrimmon	Trevor Baxendale	2 April 2009
75	"T.R.O.L"	Heather McCrimmon	Christopher Cooper	9 April 2009
76	"Cyclops"	Heather McCrimmon	Steve Lyons	16 April 2009
77	"The Crystal Palace"	Heather McCrimmon	Christopher Cooper	23 April 2009
78	"The Spirit of Ashgar"	Heather McCrimmon	Trevor Baxendale	30 April 2008
79	"Monster Idol"	Heather McCrimmon	Steve Lyons	7 May 2009
80	"The Slakken Cat"	Heather McCrimmon	Craig Donaghy	14 May 2009
81	"Code Freeze"	Heather McCrimmon	Christopher Cooper	21 May 2009
82	"Hear No Evil"	Heather McCrimmon	Steve Lyons	28 May 2009
83	"Terror in the TARDIS"	Heather McCrimmon	Christopher Cooper	4 June 2009
84	"The Ball and Chain Gang"	Heather McCrimmon	Craig Donaghy	11 June 2009
85	"The Memory Collective"	Heather McCrimmon	Craig Donaghy	18 June 2009
86	"The Blue Star Bomb"	Heather McCrimmon	Trevor Baxendale	25 June 2008
87	"Flight of the Glurgeax"	Heather McCrimmon and Wolfgang Ryter	Christopher Cooper	2 July 2009
88	"Starstruck"	Heather and Wolfgang	Craig Donaghy	9 July 2009
89	"The Genius Trap"	Heather and Wolfgang	Steve Lyons	16 July 2009
90	"The Rising Tide"	Heather and Wolfgang	Eddie Robson	23 July 2009
91	"Sweet Dreams"	Heather and Wolfgang	Craig Donaghy	30 July 2009
92	"Copycat"	Heather and Wolfgang	Eddie Robson	6 August 2009
93	"Shadow of the Vaipid"	Heather and Wolfgang	Christopher Cooper	13 August 2009
94	"Snakes Alive!"	Heather and Wolfgang	Steve Lyons	20 August 2009
95	"The Sparkling Planet"	Heather and Wolfgang	Steve Lyons	27 August 2009
96	"The Curse of Vladula"	Heather and Wolfgang	Christopher Cooper	3 September 2009
97	"Photo Finish"	Heather and Wolfgang	Eddie Robson	10 September 2009
98	"Brain Train"	Heather and Wolfgang	Christopher Cooper	17 September 2009
99	"Foot Soldiers"	Heather and Wolfgang	Eddie Robson	24 September 2009
100	"Bad Wolfie"	Heather and Wolfgang	Christopher Cooper	1 October
101	"City of Light"	Heather McCrimmon	Eddie Robson	8 October 2009
102	"The Guardian of Murcher"	Heather McCrimmon	Craig Donaghy	15 October 2009
103	"Night of the Burnt Toast"	Heather McCrimmon	Christopher Cooper	22 October 2009
104	"The Ghost Factory"	Heather McCrimmon	Craig Donaghy	29 October 2009
105	"Skydive!"	Heather McCrimmon	Trevor Baxendale	5 November 2009
106	"Highway Robbery"	Heather McCrimmon	Steve Lyons	12 November 2009
107	"Doomsilk"	Heather McCrimmon	Trevor Baxendale	19 November 2009
108	"One Careful Owner"	Heather McCrimmon	Eddie Robson	26 November 2009
109	"The Garden Rebellion"	Heather McCrimmon	Christopher Cooper	3 December 2009
110	"The Goats of Christmas Past"	Heather McCrimmon	Eddie Robson	10 December 2009
111	"A Merry Little Christmas"	Heather McCrimmon	Eddie Robson	17 December 2009
112	"We Will Rock You"	Heather McCrimmon	Christopher Cooper	30 December 2009
113	"The Highest Stake"	Heather McCrimmon	Eddie Robson	7 January 2010
114	"Hook, Line and Sinker"	Heather McCrimmon	Christopher Cooper	14 January 2010
115	"The Unwelcome Visitors"	Heather McCrimmon	Eddie Robson	21 January 2010
116	"Junk Food"	Heather McCrimmon	Christopher Cooper	28 January 2010
117	"Deadline"	Heather McCrimmon, the Mozhtratta	Christopher Cooper	4 February 2010
118	"Arctic Eclipse"	TBA	Oli Smith	11 February 2010
119	"Return of the Klytode"	The Klytode	Trevor Baxendale	18 February 2010
120	"Creature Feature"	TBA	Cavan Scott	25 February 2010
121	"Mudshot"	TBA	Christopher Cooper	4 March 2010
122	"Project: UFO"	TBA	Christopher Cooper	11 March 2010
123	"Borrowed Time"	TBA	Oli Smith	18 March 2010
124	"Lucky Heather"	Heather McCrimmon and Wolfgang Ryter	Christopher Cooper	25 March 2010

=== Doctor Who: Battles in Time ===
No.	Title	Featuring	Written by	Release date
1	"Growing Terror (Part 1 of 6)"	Rose Tyler	Steve Cole	September 2006
2	"Hyperstar Rising (Part 2 of 6)"	Rose Tyler	Steve Cole	September 2006
3	"Death Race Five Billion (Part 3 of 6)"	Rose Tyler	Steve Cole	September 2006
4	"The Macrobe Menace (Part 4 of 6)"	Rose Tyler	Steve Cole	September 2006
5	"The Hunt of Doom (Part 5 of 6)"	Rose Tyler	Steve Cole	September 2006
6	"Reunion of Fear (Part 6 of 6)"	Rose Tyler	Steve Cole	29 September 2006
7	"The Glutonoid Menace"	Rose Tyler	Jason Lobonk	13 December 2006
8	"Power of the Cybermen (Part 1 of 4)"	Jayne Kadett, Cybermen	Steve Cole	27 December 2006
9	"Drones of Doom (Part 2 of 4)"	Jayne Kadett, Cybermen	Steve Cole	December 2006
10	"Enemy Mine (Part 3 of 4)"	Jayne Kadett, Cybermen	Steve Cole	December 2006
11	"Time of the Cybermen (Part 4 of 4)"	Jayne Kadett, Cybermen	Steve Cole	7 January 2007
12	"Beneath the Skin (Part 1 of 4)"	TBA	Steve Cole	21 February 2007
13	"The Sky Below (Part 2 of 4)"	TBA	Steve Cole	March 2007
14	"Beyond the Sea (Part 3 of 4)"	TBA	Steve Cole	March 2007
15	"Lonely Planet (Part 4 of 4)"	TBA	Steve Cole	4 April 2007
16	"Plague Panic"	TBA	Claire Lister	18 April 2007
17	"Exhausting Evil"	Martha Jones	Claire Lister	2 May 2007
18	"Wraith of the Warrior (Part 1 of 4)"	Martha Jones	Steve Cole	16 May 2007
19	"The Screaming Prison (Part 2 of 4)"	Martha Jones	Steve Cole	May - June 2007
20	"Force and Fury (Part 3 of 4)"	Martha Jones	Steve Cole	May - June 2007
21	"The Warrior's Revenge (Part 4 of 4)"	Marth Jones	Steve Cole	27 June 2007
22	"Head Start (Part 1 of 4)"	Martha Jones	Mike Tucker	11 July 2007
23	"Jewel of the Vile (Part 2 of 4)"	Martha Jones	Mike Tucker	July - August 2007
24	"Lock, Stocks and Barrel (Part 3 of 4)"	Martha Jones	Steve Cole	July - August 2007
25	"End Game (Part 4 of 4)"	Martha Jones	Steve Cole	22 August 2007
26	"The Millennium Blag (Part 1 of 4)"	Martha Jones	Steve Cole	5 September 2007
27	"Second Wave (Part 2 of 4)"	Martha Jones	Steve Cole	September - October 2007
28	"Operation: Lock-Up (Part 3 of 4)"	Martha Jones	Steve Cole	September - October 2007
29	"Crime After Crime (Part 4 of 4)"	Martha Jones	Steve Cole	17 October 2007
30	"House Pests"	Martha Jones	Jason Lobonk	31 October 2007
31	"Minor Troubles (Part 1 of 3)"	Martha Jones	Claire Lister	14 November 2007
32	"Inhuman Sacrifice (Part 2 of 3)"	Marth Jones	Claire Lister	November - December 2007
33	"Crime and Punishment (Part 3 of 3)"	Martha Jones	Claire Lister	12 December 2007
34	"The Diamonds of Sartor (Part 1 of 3)"	TBA	Jason Lobonk	26 December 2007
35	"Quarsian Mission (Part 2 of 3)"	TBA	Jason Lobonk	December 2007 - January 2008
36	"Android of Death (Part 3 of 3)"	TBA	Jason Lobonk	24 January 2008
37	"Blooms of Doom"	TBA	Kieran Grant	7 February 2008
38	"Dusty Death (Part 1 of 4)"	TBA	Steve Cole	21 February 2008
39	"Cold Assassin (Part 2 of 4)"	TBA	Steve Cole	February - April 2008
40	"Designs of Dust (Part 3 of 4)"	TBA	Steve Cole	February - April 2008
41	"A Suitable Showdown (Part 4 of 4)"	TBA	Steve Cole	3 April 2008
42	"The Creative Spark"	TBA	Simon Furman	17 April 2008
43	"Any Old Iron (Part 1 of 2)"	Donna Noble	Kieran Grant	1 May 2008
44	"Merchant of Menace (Pat 2 of 2)"	Donna Noble	Kieran Grant	14 May 2008
45	"The Black Sea (Part 1 of 4)"	Donna Noble	Jason Lobonk	28 May 2008
46	"Sting of the Serpent (Part 2 of 4)"	Donna Noble	May - July 2008	Jason Lobonk
47	"Attack of the Rats (Part 3 of 4)"	Donna Noble	Jason Lobonk	May - July 2008
48	"The Zantraan Invasion (Part 4 of 4)"	Donna Noble	Jason Lobonk	9 July 2008
49	"Pawns of the Zenith (Part 1 of 4)"	Donna Noble	Neil Corry	23 July 2008
50	"Swarm of the Zenith (Part 2 of 4)"	Donna Noble	Neil Corry	July - September 2008
51	"Prey of the Zenith (Part 4 of 4)"	Donna Noble	Neil Corry	July - September 2008
52	"Lair of the Zenith (Part 4 of 4)"	Donna Noble	Neil Corry	3 September 2008
53	"Carnage Zoo (Part 1 of 4)"	The Daleks	Steve Cole	12 November 2008
54	"Flight and Fury (Part 2 of 4)"	The Daleks	Steve Cole	November - December 2008
55	"The Living Ghost (Part 3 of 4)"	The Daleks	Steve Cole	November - December 2008
56	"Extermination of the Daleks (Part 4 of 4)"	The Daleks	Steve Cole	24 December 2008
57	"Da Vinci's Robot (Part 1 of 2)"	Leonardo da Vinci	Simon Furman	7 January 2009
58	"Metal Mania (Part 2 of 2)"	Leonardo da Vinci	Steve Cole	21 January 2009
59	"About Last Night (Part 1 of 2)"	TBA	Alan Campbell	4 February 2009
60	"Dark Side of the Moon (Part 2 of 2)"	TBA	Alan Campbell	18 February 2009
61	"The Day The Earth Was Sold (Part 1 of 2)"	TBA	Neil Corry & Kieran Grant	4 March 2009
62	"The King of Earth (Part 2 of 2)"	TBA	Neil Corry & Kieran Grant	18 March 2009
63	"The Guardian of Terror (Part 1 of 2)"	TBA	Jason Lobonk	1 April 2009
64	"The Rebirth of Corah (Part 2 of 2)"	TBA	Jason Lobonk	15 April 2009
65	"The House at the End of the World (Part 1 of 2)"	TBA	Steve Cole	29 April 2009
66	"The End (Part 2 of 2)"	TBA	Steve Cole	13 May 2009

=== Doctor Who Storybook ===
No.	Title	Featuring	Written by	Release date
1	"Opera of Doom!"	Rose Tyler	Jonathan Morris	2006
2	"Sun Screen"	Martha Jones	Jonathan Morris	2007
3	"The Immortal Emperor"	Donna Noble	Jonathan Morris	2008
4	"Space Vikings!"	TBA	Jonathan Morris	2009

=== Doctor Who (IDW) ===
No.	Title	Featuring	Written by	Release date
1	"Agent Provocateur"	Martha Jones	Gary Russell	January - June 2008
2	"The Forgotten"	Martha Jones, the First Doctor, the Second Doctor, the Third Doctor, the Fourth Doctor, the Fifth Doctor, the Sixth Doctor, the Seventh Doctor, the Eighth Doctor and the Ninth Doctor	Tony Lee	August 2008 - January 2009
3	"The Whispering Gallery"	Martha Jones	John Reppion & Leah Moore	February 2009
4	"The Time Machination"	Torchwood	Tony Lee	May 2009
5	"Autopia"	Donna Noble	John Ostrander	June 2009
6	"A Room with a Deja View"	TBA	Rich Johnston	July 2009
7	"Silver Scream"	Emily Winters and Matthew Finnegan	Tony Lee	July - August 2009
8	"Cold-Blooded War"	Donna Noble	Richard Starkings	August 2009
9	"Black Death... White Life"	Martha Jones	Charlie Kirchoff	September 2009
10	"Fugitives"	Emily, Matthew, Judoon and Sontarans	Tony Lee	September - December 2009
11	"Tessaract"	Emily and Matthew	Tony Lee	January - February 2010
12	"Don't Step On The Grass"	Emily, Matthew, Martha Jones and UNIT	Tony Lee	March - June 2010
13	"Old Friend"	Emily Winters	Tony Lee	2010
14	"Final Sacrifice"	Emily, Matthew and Time Lords	Tony Lee	July - October 2010
15	"Ground Control"	TBA	Jonathan L. Davies	2010
16	"The Big, Blue Box"	TBA	Matthew Dow Smith	2010
17	"To Sleep, Perchance to Dream"	Sarah Jane Smith, Vislor Turlough, Astrid Peth, Susan Foreman, Adric and Kamelion	Al Davison	2010

=== Titan Comics ===
Issues	Title	Featuring	Written by	Artist	Cover date
Doctor Who: The Tenth Doctor
#1-3	"Revolutions of Terror"	Gabby Gonzalez and Cindy Wu	Nick Abadzis	Elena Casagrande	August - October 2014
#4-5	"The Arts in Space"	Gabby Gonzalez	Nick Abadzis	Elena Casagrande	November - December 2014
#6-9	"The Weeping Angels of Mons"	Gabby Gonzalez and Weeping Angels	Robbie Morrison	Daniel Indro	January - May 2015
#10	"Echo"	Gabby Gonzalez and Cindy Wu	Robbie Morrison	Eleonora Carlini	June 2015
#11-12	"The Fountains of Forever"	Gabby Gonzalez, Cindy Wu, Anubis and the Ninth Doctor	Nick Abadzis	Elena Casagrande, Eleonora Carlini	July 2015
#13-14	"Spiral Staircase"	Gabby Gonzalez and Cindy Wu	Nick Abadzis	Rachael Stott, Leonardo Romero	August 2015
#15	"Sins of the Father"	Gabby Gonzalez and Cindy Wu	Nick Abadzis	Elena Casagrande	September 2015
Doctor Who: The Tenth Doctor Year Two
#1-2	"The Singer Not the Song"	Gabby Gonzalez	Nick Abadzis	Eleonora Carlina	October - November 2015
#3	"Cindy, Cleo and the Magic Sketchbook"	Cindy Wu and Jack Harkness	Nick Abadzis	Elena Casagrande, Arianna Florean	December 2015
#4-5	"Medicine Man"	Gabby Gonzalez	Nick Abadzis	Leonardo Romero, Elena Casagrande	January - February 2016
#6-7	"Arena of Fear"	Gabby Gonzalez, Cindy Wu, and Jack Harkness	Nick Abadzis	Eleonora Carlini, Elena Casagrande	March - April 2016
#8-9	"The Wishing Well Witch"	Gabby Gonzalez and Cindy Wu	Nick Abadzis	Eleonora Carlini, Iolanda Zanfardino	Late April - May 2016
#10	"The Infinite Corridor"	Gabby Gonzalez and Cindy Wu	Nick Abadzis	Elena Casagrande	June 2016
#11	"The Jazz Monster"	Gabby Gonzalez and Cindy Wu	Nick Abadzis	Giorgia Sposito	July 2016
#12	"Music Man"	Gabby Gonzalez and Cindy Wu	Nick Abadzis	Giorgia Sposito	August 2016
#13-17	"Old Girl"	Gabby Gonzalez, Cindy Wu, Anubis and Sutekh	Nick Abadzis	Giorgia Sposito, Eleonora Carlini	August 2016 - January 2017
Doctor Who: The Tenth Doctor Year Three
#1-2	"Breakfast at Tyranny's"	Gabby Gonzalez, Cindy Wu, and Anubis	Nick Abadzis	Giorgia Sposito, Valeria Favoccia	February - March 2017
#3-4	"Sharper Than a Serpent's Tooth"	Gabby Gonzalez, Cindy Wu, and Anubis	Nick Abadzis	Giorgia Sposito	April - May 2017
#5	"Revolving Doors"	Gabby Gonzalez	James Peaty	Warren Pleece	June 2017
#6-8, #10	"Vortex Butterflies"	Gabby Gonzalez, Cindy Wu, Anubis, Sarah Jane Smith and the Twelfth Doctor	Nick Abadzis	Giorgia Sposito	July - September, November 2017
#9	"The Lost Dimension [Part Three of Eight]"	TBA	Nick Abadzis	Mariano Laclaustra, Carlos Cabrera	October 2017
#11-14	"The Good Companion"	Gabby Gonzalez, Cindy Wu, and Anubis	Nick Abadzis	Giorgia Sposito	December 2017 - March 2018

==== Summer Events ====
Issues	Title	Featuring	Written by	Release date
1	"Four Doctors"	Gabby Gonzalez, Alice Obiefune, Clara Oswald, the Eleventh Doctor and the Twelfth Doctor	Paul Cornell	August - September 2015
2	"Supremacy of the Cybermen"	Rose Tyler, Captain Jack Harkness, Gabby Gonzalez, Cindy Wu, Alice Obiefune, the Ninth Doctor, the Eleventh Doctor and the Twelfth Doctor	George Mann and Cavan Scott	July - November 2016
3	"The Lost Dimension"	Josie Day, Rose Tyler, Captain Jack Harkness, Gabby Gonzalez, Cindy Wu, Alice Obiefune, Nardole, Bill Potts, the First Doctor, the Second Doctor, the Third Doctor, the Fourth Doctor, the Fifth Doctor, the Sixth Doctor, the Seventh Doctor, the Eighth Doctor, the War Doctor, the Ninth Doctor, the Eleventh Doctor and the Twelfth Doctor	George Mann and Cavan Scott	August - November 2017

=== Doctor Who Annual ===
No.	Title	Featuring	Written by	Release date
1	"Down the Rabbit Hole"	Rose Tyler	Davey Moore	2006
2	"Myth Maker"	Martha Jones	Davey Moore	2007
3	"Swarm Enemies"	Martha Jones	Davey Moore	2007
4	"The Greatest Mall in the Universe"	Donna Noble	Collin Brake	2008
5	"The Time Sickness"	Donna Noble	Trevor Baxendale	2008
6	"Death Disco"	Donna Noble	Alan Barnes	2008
7	"The Vortex Code"	TBA	Trevor Baxendale	2009
8	"Health & Safety"	TBA	Christopher Cooper	2009

== Short stories ==
=== Doctor Who Annual ===
No.	Title	Featuring	Written by	Release date
1	"The Planet That Wepted"	Martha Jones	Justin Richards	2007
2	"Once Upon a Time"	Donna Noble	Justin Richards	2008
3	"Most Beautiful Music"	Donna Noble	Justin Richards	2008

=== Doctor Who Storybook ===
No.	Title	Featuring	Written by	Release date
1	"Cuckoo-Spit"	Rose Tyler	Mark Gatiss	2006
2	"The Cat Came Back"	Rose Tyler	Gareth Roberts	2006
3	"Gravestone House"	Rose Tyler	Justin Richards	2006
4	"Untitled"	Rose Tyler	Robert Shearman	2006
5	"No One Died"	Rose Tyler	Nicholas Briggs	2006
6	"Corner of the Eye"	Rose Tyler	Steven Moffat	2006
7	"Cats and Dogs"	TBA	Tom MacRae	2007
8	"The Body Bank"	Martha Jones, Chelonians	Gareth Roberts	2007
9	"Box Under The Tree"	Martha Jones	Robert Shearman	2007
10	"Zombie Motel"	Martha Jones	Paul Magrs	2007
11	"The Iron Circle"	Martha Jones	Nicholas Briggs	2007
12	"Kiss of Life"	Martha Jones	Justin Pegg	2007
13	"Deep Water"	Martha Jones	Nicholas Briggs	2007
14	"Hello Children... Everywhere"	Donna Noble	Paul Magrs	2008
15	"Grand Theft Planet"	Donna Noble	James Morgan	2008
16	"Cold"	Donna Noble	Mark Gatiss	2008
17	"The Big Bong"	Donna Noble	Clayton Hickman & Gareth Roberts	2008
18	"Island of the Sirens"	Donna Noble	Keith Temple	2008
19	"Hold Your Horses"	Donna Noble	Nicholas Briggs	2008
20	"The Puplet"	Donna Noble	Gary Russell	2008
21	"Total Eclipse of the Heart"	UNIT	Oli Smith	2009
22	"The End of the Rainbow"	TBA	Jacqueline Rayner	2009
23	"Scared Stiff"	The Gelth	Mark Gatiss	2008
24	"Bennelong Point"	TBA	Keith Temple	2009
25	"The Shape on the Chair"	TBA	Matt Jones	2009
26	"Knock, Knock!"	TBA	Paul Magrs	2009
27	"The Haldenmor Fugues"	TBA	James Moran	2009

== See also ==
- List of Doctor Who comic stories
- First Doctor comic stories
- Second Doctor comic stories
- Third Doctor comic stories
- Fourth Doctor comic strips
- Fifth Doctor comic stories
- Sixth Doctor comic stories
- Eighth Doctor comic stories
- Ninth Doctor comic stories
- Eleventh Doctor comic stories
- Twelfth Doctor comic stories
- Thirteenth Doctor comic stories
- Fourteenth Doctor comic stories
