= Fourth Doctor comic stories =

Publications in the Doctor Who franchise

Fourth Doctor comic stories is a collection of the offscreen and comic adventures of the fourth incarnation of The Doctor, the protagonist of the long-running, hit sc-fi series, Doctor Who.

== History ==
When Doctor Who Weekly began publishing in 1979, the Fourth Doctor (played by Tom Baker) was the current Doctor on television.

Doctor Who Weekly took over an ongoing regular comic strip presence of the Doctor's adventures from TV Comic. Central to the concept of Doctor Who Weekly (later renamed as Doctor Who Magazine), was to offer more mature comic strip adventures than had previously appeared.

The Doctor Who Magazine comic strip launched with the Doctor travelling on his own. Later a number of new as well as more familiar characters were included. (These decisions were largely determined by the issue of image rights).

While most of the adventures occur within their own continuity, direct references to the television series make placing these adventures into on-screen continuity problematic.

While Doctor Who Magazine mostly uses the current Doctor in the regular comic strip adventures, later Fourth Doctor comic strip stories have appeared from time to time in the regular magazine, specials and in other publications. The Fourth Doctor's comic strip adventures have gone through the most reprints and his early DWM strips are widely regarded as among the best.

== Polystyle comic strips ==
=== TV Comic ===
No.	Title	Featuring	Written by	Release Date
1	"Death Flower"	Sarah Jane Smith	TBD	January 1975
1	"Death Flower"	Sarah Jane Smith	TBD	March 1975
2	"Return of the Daleks"	Sarah Jane, the Daleks and the Time Lords	TBD	March 1975
2	"Return of the Daleks"	Sarah Jane, the Daleks and the Time Lords	TBD	May 1975
3	"The Wreckers!"	Sarah Jane	Dennis Hooper	May 1975
3	"The Wreckers!"	Sarah Jane	Dennis Hooper	July 1975
4	"The Emperor's Spy"	Sarah Jane	TBD	July 1975
4	"The Emperor's Spy"	Sarah Jane	TBD	September 1975
5	"The Sinister Sea"	Sarah Jane	TBD	September 1975
5	"The Sinister Sea"	Sarah Jane	TBD	October 1975
6	"The Space Ghost"	Sarah Jane	TBD	October 1975
6	"The Space Ghost"	Sarah Jane	TBD	November 1975
7	"The Dalek Revenge"	Sarah Jane and the Daleks	TBD	December 1975
7	"The Dalek Revenge"	Sarah Jane and the Daleks	TBD	January 1976
8	"Virus"	Sarah Jane	TBD	January 1976
8	"Virus"	Sarah Jane	TBD	March 1976
9	"Treasure Trail"	Sarah Jane and the Time Lords	TBD	March 1976
9	"Treasure Trail"	Sarah Jane and the Time Lords	TBD	May 1976
10	"Hubert's Folly"	Sarah Jane	TBD	May 1976
10	"Hubert's Folly"	Sarah Jane	TBD	June 1976
11	"Counter-rotation"	Sarah Jane	TBD	June 1976
11	"Counter-rotation"	Sarah Jane	TBD	August 1976
12	"Mind Snatch"	Sarah Jane	TBD	August 1976
12	"Mind Snatch"	Sarah Jane	TBD	September 1976
13	"The Hoaxers"	Sarah Jane	TBD	September 1976
14	"The Mutant Strain"	Tom Lambert	TBD	September 1976
14	"The Mutant Strain"	Tom Lambert	TBD	October 1976
15	"Double Trouble"	The Time Lords	TBD	October 1976
15	"Double Trouble"	The Time Lords	TBD	December 1976
16	"Dredger"	Sarah Jane	Geoff Cowan	December 1976
16	"Dredger"	Sarah Jane	Geoff Cowan	January 1977
17	"The False Planet"	TBA	TBD	February 1977
17	"The False Planet"	TBA	TBD	March 1977
18	"The Fire Feeders"	Inspector Keel	TBD	March 1977
18	"The Fire Feeders"	Inspector Keel	TBD	May 1977
19	"Kling Dynasty"	TBA	TBD	May 1977
19	"Kling Dynasty"	TBA	TBD	July 1977
20	"The Orb"	Leela	TBD	July 1977
20	"The Orb"	Leela	TBD	August 1977
21	"The Mutants"	Leela and the Time Lords	TBD	August 1977
21	"The Mutants"	Leela and the Time Lords	TBD	October 1977
22	"The Devil's Mouth"	Leela	Geoff Cowan	October 1977
22	"The Devil's Mouth"	Leela	Geoff Cowan	November 1977
23	"The Aqua-City"	Leela	Geoff Cowan	November 1977
23	"The Aqua-City"	Leela	Geoff Cowan	January 1978
24	"The Snow Devils"	TBA	TBD	January 1978
24	"The Snow Devils"	TBA	TBD	February 1978
25	"The Space Garden"	TBA	TBD	February 1978
25	"The Space Garden"	TBA	TBD	March 1978
26	"The Eerie Manor"	TBA	TBD	March 1978
26	"The Eerie Manor"	TBA	TBD	April 1978
27	"Guardians of the Tomb"	TBA	TBD	April 1978
27	"Guardians of the Tomb"	TBA	TBD	May 1978
28	"The Image Makers"	The Time Lords	TBD	May 1978
28	"The Image Makers"	The Time Lords	TBD	June 1978
29 †	"The Duellists"	TBA	TBD	July 1978

† indicates a reprinted story with the artwork altered to show the Fourth Doctor in place of the Doctor in the original story

== Doctor Who Magazine comic strips ==
=== Doctor Who Weekly ===
Two of the early strips ("The Iron Legion" and "The Star Beast") were adapted as audio stories under The Comic Strip Adaptations by Big Finish Productions in 2019. "The Star Beast" was then adapted into a television episode in 2023.

No.	Title	Featuring	Written by	Release Date
1	"The Iron Legion"	none	Pat Mills and John Wagner	October 1979
1	"The Iron Legion"	none	Pat Mills and John Wagner	December 1979
2	"City of the Damned"	none	John Wagner and Pat Mills	December 1979
2	"City of the Damned"	none	John Wagner and Pat Mills	January 1980
3	"Timeslip"	K9	Dez Skinn	February 1980
4	"The Star Beast"	Sharon and K9	Pat Mills and John Wagner	February 1980
4	"The Star Beast"	Sharon and K9	Pat Mills and John Wagner	April 1980
5	"The Dogs of Doom"	Sharon and K9, and the Daleks	John Wagner and Pat Mills	April 1980
5	"The Dogs of Doom"	Sharon and K9, and the Daleks	John Wagner and Pat Mills	June 1980
6	"The Time Witch"	Sharon and K9	Steve Moore	June 1980
6	"The Time Witch"	Sharon and K9	Steve Moore	July 1980
7	"Dragon's Claw"	Sharon and K9, and the Sontarans	Steve Moore	July 1980
7	"Dragon's Claw"	Sharon and K9, and the Sontarans	Steve Moore	October 1980
8	"The Collector"	Sharon and K9	Steve Moore	November 1980
9	"Dreamers of Death"	Sharon and K9	Steve Moore	December 1980
9	"Dreamers of Death"	Sharon and K9	Steve Moore	January 1981
10	"The Life Bringer"	K9	Steve Moore	February 1981
10	"The Life Bringer"	K9	Steve Moore	March 1981
11	"War of the Words"	none	Steve Moore	April 1981
12	"Spider God"	none	Steve Moore	May 1981
13	"The Deal"	none	Steve Parkhouse	June 1981
14	"The End of the Line"	none	Steve Parkhouse	July 1981
14	"The End of the Line"	none	Steve Parkhouse	August 1981
15	"The Free-Fall Warrior"	Dr Ivan Asimoff	Steve Parkhouse	September 1981
15	"The Free-Fall Warrior"	Dr Ivan Asimoff	Steve Parkhouse	October 1981
16	"Junkyard Demon"	The Cybermen	Steve Parkhouse	November 1981
16	"Junkyard Demon"	The Cybermen	Steve Parkhouse	December 1981
17	"The Neutron Knights"	King Arthur Pendragon and Merlin	Steve Parkhouse	January 1982

=== Doctor Who Yearbook ===
No.	Title	Featuring	Written by	Release Date
1	"Rest and Re-Creation"	Leela and the Zygons	Warwick Gray	1994
2	"The Naked Flame"	Sarah Jane Smith	Warwick Gray	1995
3	"Star Beast II"	Sharon and K9	Gary Gillatt	1996
4	"Junkyard Demon II"	The Cybermen	Alan Barnes	1996

== Titan Comics ==
No.	Title	Featuring	Written by	Release Date
1	"Gaze of the Medusa"	Sarah Jane Smith	Gordon Rennie and Emma Beeby	March 2016
1	"Gaze of the Medusa"	Sarah Jane Smith	Gordon Rennie and Emma Beeby	September 2016

== See also ==
- List of Doctor Who comic stories
- First Doctor comic stories
- Second Doctor comic stories
- Third Doctor comic stories
- Fifth Doctor comic stories
- Sixth Doctor comic stories
- Eighth Doctor comic stories
- War Doctor comic stories
- Ninth Doctor comic stories
- Tenth Doctor comic stories
- Eleventh Doctor comic stories
- Twelfth Doctor comic stories
