= Eighth Doctor comic stories =

Comics in the Doctor Who franchise

Eighth Doctor comic stories are two ranges of comic series that featured the adventures of the eighth incarnation of The Doctor, the protagonist of the hit sc-fi series, Doctor Who.

Two separate series of original comic strips featuring the Eighth Doctor (and thus the likeness of actor Paul McGann) were published during the character's original tenure. Radio Times published a weekly comic strip for a time. There was also the standard Doctor Who Magazine strip. The two series introduced brand-new companions, although the Eighth Doctor's only on-screen companion, Grace Holloway, also appeared twice. There were also cameo appearances by companions from past DWM series, and The Master was resurrected.

During the latter period of the DWM's comic stories, the stories switched from black and white strips to full colour.

One of the strip's most noted fans was Russell T Davies, the future executive producer and head writer of the revived Doctor Who series. Davies had proposed that the Magazine's strip regenerate McGann's Doctor at the conclusion of "The Flood". Whilst a draft was prepared to include the regeneration, the idea was abandoned as the Magazine team had reservations about taking such an important element from the television series should McGann ever be used in the series for flashback purposes. Eventually, the decision was taken to simply end "The Flood" on a note similar to Survival, with the Eighth Doctor and Destrii's later adventures left a mystery to the readers.

It has been speculated that Davies loosely adapted elements from "The Flood" in his later Doctor Who storylines "The Parting of the Ways" and "Army of Ghosts" (in particular the Doctor absorbing the time/space vortex to save Rose Tyler's life, triggering his regeneration, and the ghost-shifting infiltration of the Cybermen on an unsuspecting public).

== Stories ==
=== Doctor Who Magazine ===
| No. | Title | Featuring | Written by | Release date |
|---|---|---|---|---|
| 1 | "Endgame" | Izzy Sinclar and Maxwell Edison, and the Celestial Toymaker | Alan Barnes | 23 October 1996 - 15 January 1997 |
| 2 | "The Keep" | Izzy | Alan Barnes | 12 February - 12 March 1997 |
| 3 | "A Life of Matter and Death" | Izzy, Sir Justin, Shayde and Dr Ivan Asimoff | Alan Barnes | 9 April 1997 |
| 4 | "Fire and Brimstone" | Izzy and the Daleks | Alan Barnes | 7 May - 27 August 1997 |
| 5 | "By Hook or By Crook" | Izzy | Scott Gray | 24 September 1997 |
| 6 | "Tooth and Claw" | Izzy and Fey Truscott-Sade | Alan Barnes | 22 October 1997 - 14 January 1998 |
| 7 | "The Final Chapter" | Izzy, Fey, Shayde and the Time Lords | Alan Barnes | 11 March - 3 June 1998 |
| 8 | "Wormwood" | Izzy, Fey and Shayde | Scott Gray | 1 July - 18 November 1998 |
| 9 | "Happy Deathday" | Izzy, and all eight Doctors, Daleks, Davros, Sontarans, Silurians and Ice Warriors | Scott Gray | 16 December 1998 |
| 10 | "The Fallen" | Izzy, Dr Grace Holloway and Leighton Woodrow | Scott Gray | 13 January - 7 April 1999 |
| 11 | "The Road to Hell" | Izzy | Scott Gray | 2 June - 22 September 1999 |
| 12 | "TV Action!" | Izzy | Alan Barnes | 20 October 1999 |
| 13 | "The Company of Thieves" | Izzy and Kroton, and the Cybermen | Scott Gray | 17 November 1999 - 12 January 2000 |
| 14 | "The Glorious Dead" | Izzy and Kroton, and the Master | Scott Gray | 9 February - 18 October 2000 |
| 15 | "The Autonomy Bug" | Izzy | Scott Gray | 15 November 2000 - 10 January 2001 |
| 16 | "Ophidius" | Izzy and Destrii | Scott Gray | 7 February - 2 May 2001 |
| 17 | "Beautiful Freak" | Izzy | Scott Gray | 30 May 2001 |
| 18 | "The Way of All Flesh" | Izzy | Scott Gray | 19 September - 14 November 2001 |
| 19 | "Children of the Revolution" | Izzy and the Daleks | Scott Gray | 9 January - 29 May 2002 |
| 20 | "Me and My Shadow" | Fey Truscott-Shade and Shayde | Scott Gray | 26 June 2002 |
| 21 | "Uroboros" | Feyde and Destrii | Scott Gray | 24 July - 16 October 2002 |
| 22 | "Oblivion" | Izzy, Feyde and Destrii | Scott Gray | 13 November 2002 - 2 April 2003 |
| 23 | "Where Nobody Knows Your Name" | Frobisher | Scott Gray | 30 April 2003 |
| 24 | "The Nightmare Game" | TBA | Gareth Roberts | 28 May - 23 June 2003 |
| 25 | "The Power of Thoueris" | TBA | Scott Gray | 20 August 2003 |
| 26 | "The Curious Tale of Spring-Heeled Jack" | TBA | Scott Gray | 17 September - 12 November 2003 |
| 27 | "The Land of Happy Endings" | John and Gillian | Scott Gray | 10 December 2003 |
| 28 | "Bad Blood" | Destrii | Scott Gray | 7 January - 28 April 2004 |
| 29 | "Sins of the Father" | Destrii | Scott Gray | 26 May - 21 July 2004 |
| 30 | "The Flood" | Destrii and Leighton Woodrow, and the Cybermen | Scott Gray | 18 August 2004 - 2 March 2005 |

=== Radio Times ===
| No. | Title | Featuring | Written by | Release date |
|---|---|---|---|---|
| 1 | "Dreadnought" | Stacy Townsend, and the Cybermen | Gary Russell | 1–9 August 1996 |
| 2 | "Descendance" | Stacy and Ssard, and the Ice Warriors | Gary Russell | 10–18 October 1996 |
| 3 | "Ascendance" | Stacy and Ssard | Gary Russell | 19 October 1996 - 3 January 1997 |
| 4 | "Perceptions" | Stacy and Ssard | Gary Russell | 10 January - 14 March 1997 |
| 5 | "Coda" | Stacy and Ssard | Gary Russell | 21–28 March 1997 |

=== Doctor Who: The Eighth Doctor (Titan Comics) ===
| No. | Title | Featuring | Written by | Release date |
|---|---|---|---|---|
| 1 | "The Pictures of Josephine Day" | Josie | George Mann | 4 November 2015 |
| 2 | "Music of the Spherions" | Josie | George Mann | 9 December 2015 |
| 3 | "The Silvering" | Josie | George Mann | 13 January 2016 |
| 4 | "Briarwood" | Josie, Clara, and the Twelfth Doctor | George Mann | 17 February 2016 |
| 5 | "A Matter of Life and Death" | Josie, Clara, and the Twelfth Doctor | George Mann | 16 March 2016 |

== See also ==
- List of Doctor Who comic stories
- First Doctor comic stories
- Second Doctor comic stories
- Third Doctor comic stories
- Fourth Doctor comic strips
- Fifth Doctor comic stories
- Sixth Doctor comic stories
- War Doctor comic stories
- Ninth Doctor comic stories
- Tenth Doctor comic stories
- Eleventh Doctor comic stories
- Twelfth Doctor comic stories

As of this edit, this article uses content from "Eighth Doctor comic stories", which is licensed in a way that permits reuse under the Creative Commons Attribution-ShareAlike 3.0 Unported License, but not under the GFDL. All relevant terms must be followed.
