= Ninth Doctor comic stories =

The Ninth Doctor comic stories feature the ninth incarnation of the Doctor from the television science fiction series Doctor Who. The Ninth Doctor's brief comic tenure included the involvement of Rose Tyler. No other Doctor had a run as brief as the Ninth and none used exclusively his televised companion.

The Ninth Doctor's Doctor Who Magazine run was the only one ever completely drawn by a single penciller — Mike Collins — though other eras were nearly drawn by a single artist. The Ninth Doctor's run as the incumbent Doctor was just nine DWM issues long, plus a single story in an annual, making him by far the shortest-lived Doctor in comics. An ongoing comic book was launched by Titan in 2016.

== Comics ==
=== Doctor Who Magazine ===
No.	Title	Featuring	Written by	Release date
1	"The Love Invasion"	Rose Tyler	Gareth Roberts	27 April - 22 June 2005
The Doctor travels to 1966, to find an alien called Igrix is planning to prevent a war by destroying the moon.
2	"Art Attack!"	Rose Tyler	Mike Collins	20 July 2005
The Doctor goes to the Oriel, a gallery housing the art that survived World War V. He soon has to prevent the "Invasion of the Lawrence Llewelyn-Bowen's of Doom!"
3	"The Cruel Sea"	Rose Tyler	Robert Shearman	17 August - 9 November 2005
A private yacht owned by Alvar Chambers and his 18 ex-wives comes under attack by the sea on Mars
4	"A Groatsworth of Wit"	Rose Tyler and William Shakespeare	Gareth Roberts	7 December 2005 - 4 January 2006
Alien beings manipulate Robert Greene into killing William Shakespeare

=== Titan Comics ===
No.	Title	Featuring	Written by	Release date
#1-5 (miniseries)	"Weapons of Past Destruction"	Rose Tyler and Jack Harkness	Cavan Scott	April - December 2015
#1-3	"Doctormania"	Rose Tyler and Jack Harkness	Cavan Scott	April - June 2016
#4-5	"The Transformed"	Rose Tyler, Jack Harkness, Mickey Smith and Martha Jones	Cavan Scott	August 2016
#6-8	"Official Secrets"	Rose Tyler, Jack Harkness, Brigadier Lethbridge-Stewart, Harry Sullivan, Tara Mishra and UNIT	Cavan Scott	October 2016 - December 2016
#9-10	"Slaver's Song"	Rose Tyler, Jack Harkness and Tara Mishra	Cavan Scott	January 2017 - March 2017
#11-12	"Sin-Eaters"	Rose Tyler and Tara Mishra	Cavan Scott	March - April 2017
#13	"Secret Agent Man"	Jack Harkness	Cavan Scott	May 2017
#14-15	"The Bidding War"	Rose Tyler, Jack Harkness and Tara Mishra	Cavan Scott	June 2017
Special #1	"The Lost Dimension"	Josie Day, Rose Tyler, Captain Jack Harkness, Gabby Gonzalez, Cindy Wu, Alice Obiefune, Nardole, Bill Potts, the First Doctor, the Second Doctor, the Third Doctor, the Fourth Doctor, the Fifth Doctor, the Sixth Doctor, the Seventh Doctor, the Eighth Doctor, the War Doctor, the Tenth Doctor, the Eleventh Doctor and the Twelfth Doctor	George Mann and Cavan Scott	August - November 2017

==== Summer Events ====
No.	Title	Featuring	Written by	Release date
1	"Four Doctors"	Gabby Gonzalez, Alice Obiefune, Clara Oswald, the Tenth Doctor, the Eleventh Doctor and the Twelfth Doctor	Paul Cornell	2015
2	"Supremacy of the Cybermen"	Rose Tyler, Captain Jack Harkness, Gabby Gonzalez, Cindy Wu, Alice Obiefune, the Tenth Doctor, the Eleventh Doctor and the Twelfth Doctor	George Mann and Cavan Scott	2017 - 2018

=== Doctor Who Annuals ===
No.	Title	Featuring	Written by	Release date
1	"Mr Nobody"	Rose Tyler	Scott Gray	2005
A shopworker called Phil Tyson is mistaken for an alien, and gets transported to a space court, where he is rescued by the Doctor and Rose. He then learns, on his way home in the TARDIS, that the alien he was mistaken for was a hero.

== Short stories ==
=== Doctor Who Annuals ===
No.	Title	Featuring	Written by	Release date
1	"Doctor Vs Doctor"	Rose Tyler	Gareth Roberts	2005
Dr Merrivale Carr, the finest detective in 1920s England, is preparing to wrap up another investigation with the help of his young assistant, Henry Ransom# Strange murders are occurring at Lord Farthingale's# Dr Merrivale suspects hostess Glenda Neil# A visitor to the house calling himself "the Doctor" suspects an invisible alien# The pair, along with the Doctor's faithful Rose must join forces to discover the truth.
2	"The Masks of Makassar"	Rose Tyler	Paul Cornell	2005
The Doctor is asked to represent an alien planet. But his eternal grief at the loss of the Time Lords begins clouding his better judgement, and when Rose is put in danger, the Doctor discovers a trap has been set - and he has walked straight into it!
3	"Pitter-Patter"	Rose Tyler	Robert Shearman	2005
4	"What I did on my Christmas Holidays by Sally Sparrow"	Sally Sparrow	Steven Moffat	2005

== See also ==
- List of Doctor Who comic stories
- First Doctor comic stories
- Second Doctor comic stories
- Third Doctor comic stories
- Fourth Doctor comic strips
- Fifth Doctor comic stories
- Sixth Doctor comic stories
- Eighth Doctor comic stories
- War Doctor comic stories
- Tenth Doctor comic stories
- Eleventh Doctor comic stories
- Twelfth Doctor comic stories
