= Fifth Doctor comic stories =

Publications in the Doctor Who franchise

The Fifth Doctor comic stories is a collection of the off-screen adventures of the fifth incarnation of the Doctor, the protagonist of the television series Doctor Who.

== History ==
Doctor Who Monthly (later renamed Doctor Who Magazine) launched the Fifth Doctor's comic strip adventures with the Doctor travelling on his own. Later a number of new and familiar characters were included. While most of the adventures occur within their own continuity, direct references to the television series make placing these adventures into on-screen continuity problematic.

While Doctor Who Magazine mostly used the current personification of the Doctor in the regular comic strip adventures, Fifth Doctor comic strip stories appeared from time to time in the regular magazine, specials and in other publications after his television retirement. The Fifth Doctor comics have been reprinted in paperback book format by an Italian publisher, Panini Comics.

== Comics ==
=== Doctor Who Magazine ===
No.	Title	Featuring	Written by	First release	Last release
1	"The Tides of Time"	Sir Justin and Shayde, and Lord Rassilon	Steve Parkhouse	February 1982	August 1982
2	"Stars Fell on Stockbridge"	Maxwell Edison	Steve Parkhouse	September 1982	October 1982
3	"The Stockbridge Horror"	Shayde and the Time Lords	Steve Parkhouse	November 1982	April 1983
4	"Lunar Lagoon"	Fuji	Steve Parkhous	May 1983	June 1983
5	"4-Dimensional Vistas"	Gus Goodman, the Time Meddler and the Ice Warriors	Steve Parkhouse	July 1983	December 1983
6	"The Moderator"	Gus	Steve Parkhouse	January 1984	April 1984
7	"The Lunar Strangers"	Tegan and Turlough	Gareth Roberts	August 1994	September 1994
8	"The Curse of the Scarab"	Peri Brown	Alan Barnes	August 1994	September 1995

=== Doctor Who Yearbook ===
No.	Title	Featuring	Written by	Release Date
1	"Blood Invocation"	Nyssa and Tegan, and the Time Lords	Paul Cornell	1995

=== Doctor Who Annuals ===
No.	Title	Featuring	Written by	Release Date
1	"On the Planet Isopterus"	Adric, Nyssa and Tegan	NA	1983

== Short stories ==
=== Doctor Who Annuals ===
No.	Title	Featuring	Written by	Release Date
1	"The Keys of Vaga"	Adric	TBD	September 1981
The TARDIS arrives on Vaga, a planet the Doctor has been watching over throughout his life. But when the planet is bombarded with pyron space-sharks, the Doctor and Adric must race to protect the population, the Vagans.
2	"Planet of Fear"	Adric	TBD	September 1981
3	"Danger Down Below"	Tegan	TBD	September 1982
4	"The God Machine"	Tegan and Nyssa	TBD	September 1982
5	"The Armageddon Crysalis"	Tegan and Nyssa	TBD	September 1982
6	"The Haven"	Tegan and Nyssa	TBD	September 1982
7	"The Penalty"	Tegan and Nyssa	TBD	September 1982
8	"Night Flight to Nowhere"	Tegan and Nyssa	TBD	September 1982
9	"The Oxaqua Incident"	Tegan and Turlough	TBD	September 1983
10	"Winter on Mesique"	Tegan and Turlough	TBD	September 1983
11	"The Creation of Camelot"	Tegan and Turlough	TBD	September 1983
12	"Class 4 Renegade"	Tegan and Turlough	TBD	September 1983
13	"The Volcanis Deal"	Tegan and Turlough	TBD	September 1983
14	"The Nemertimes"	Tegan and Turlough	TBD	September 1983
15	"Fungus"	TBA	TBD	September 1983

== See also ==
- List of Doctor Who comic stories
- First Doctor comic stories
- Second Doctor comic stories
- Third Doctor comic stories
- Fourth Doctor comic strips
- Sixth Doctor comic stories
- Eighth Doctor comic stories
- War Doctor comic stories
- Ninth Doctor comic stories
- Tenth Doctor comic stories
- Eleventh Doctor comic stories
- Twelfth Doctor comic stories
