= Eleventh Doctor comic stories =

Doctor Who comic series

The Eleventh Doctor comic stories ran in several regularly published titles: Doctor Who Magazine, Doctor Who Adventures and the American Doctor Who (2011). All of these comic strip adventures were supported by appearances in the Doctor Who annuals and Doctor Who Storybooks. The Eleventh Doctor also had the honour of featuring in an original graphic novel, The Only Good Dalek – something which hadn't happened since the Sixth Doctor appeared in The Age of Chaos.

Though this multi-titled existence was something he had inherited from the Tenth Doctor, he was the first incarnation of the Doctor to start out in comic strips in at least two simultaneous monthly publications. He was also the first incarnation of the Doctor to debut in a comic strip other than the one in Doctor Who Magazine since the Eighth Doctor premiered in Radio Times. Doctor Who Adventures published its first Eleventh Doctor story several weeks before DWM launched his series of adventures.

== Comics ==
=== Doctor Who Magazine ===
No.	Title	Featuring	Writer	Release Date
1	"Supernature"	Amy Pond	Jonathan Morris	26 May – 21 July 2010
En route to Basingstoke, the TARDIS lands on a prison colony, and the Doctor and Amy are caught up in a deadly plague that transforms criminals into wild beasts. Worse still, the plague has caught up with Amy, and the Doctor must form an uneasy alliance with a gang of ruthless criminals in order to find a cure and stop the plague from reaching the galaxy. But a future prophecy states that no-one has ever made it off the planet alive.
2	"Planet Bollywood"	Amy Pond	Jonathan Morris	18 August 2010
The Doctor takes Amy to the singing paradise world of Bollywood. But as usual, the travellers are caught up in a deadly battle led by the Shasarks. The Doctor soon discovers the Shasarks are on the trail of a beautiful goddess whose powers can be used for evil, and if he doesn't reach her before they do, the singing palace of Bollywood will be struck by a deadly attack...
3	"The Golden Ones"	Amy Pond, UNIT, Axons, Chiyoko	Jonathan Morris	15 September – 15 December 2010
When a UNIT officer is killed whilst undercover, the Doctor's old friend, Martha Jones, sends him and Amy on a mission to Japan to expose alien activity at Shining Dawn, a worldwide company that seems to be controlling the minds of children via a new children's show. But as the Doctor investigates, corruption sweeps down the corridors of UNIT HQ, and someone is going to extreme lengths to get rid of him and Amy – The Axons have returned, and they have complete control over Japan, now a country at war with its own citizens.
4	"The Professor, The Queen and the Bookshop"	Amy Pond and Rory Williams, C.S.Lewis	Jonathan Morris	12 January 2011
At the Eagle and Child pub, C.S Lewis has a new tale to tell, a tale about a little girl called Amelia Pond and her friend, Rory, a tale about the mysterious Professor, a man who can travel in time in a small bookshop, a man who battles evil White Queens and deadly statues on the legendary planet "Desolation of the White Queen". But what if it was more than just a fairy story? Tonight, C.S Lewis meets the man from his imagination – The Doctor.
5	"The Screams of Death"	Amy Pond, Chiyoko	Jonathan Morris	9 February – 9 March 2011
In 17th century Paris, The Doctor and Amy visit the opera house. however, a number of singers have gone missing, and one of the girls, Cosette, is traumatised by a chance encounter with the infamous Eldritch Valdemar, a vicious warlord from the 21st century. Exiled and vengeful, Eldritch plots to prevent his exile by erasing the future of the human race... The Doctor, Amy and a band of Eldritch's victims must play a warlord at his own games. For the future of humanity depends upon them.
6	"Do Not Go Gently into That Good Night"	Amy Pond, Chiyoko	Jonathan Morris	6 April 2011
The Doctor and Amy investigate strange happenings at Hawkshaw Manor Nursing Home when a number of patients claim to have seen the ghost of their younger self. Investigating, the Doctor is alarmed to discover the manager, Miss Bruce, was unearthed by archeologists 800 years in the future and is puzzled by her presence in 2011, whilst Amy is confronted by a robot who has the power to turn the elderly into children... a second life.
7	"Forever Dreaming"	Amy Pond	Jonathan Morris	4 May – 1 June 2011
When the TARDIS materialises on a beach that resembles a 1960s seaside resort, The Doctor realises he and Amy have been lured into a trap – and the world around them is fake. Oddly enough, The trap seems to centre on Amy, as she is haunted by a handsome young man and a particular memory from her childhood. As the Doctor finds himself powerless in a world beyond imagination, Amy discovers they are in Psychspace, and she must use her deepest imagination to free the inhabitants and the Doctor, and guide them back into reality.
8	"Apotheosis"	Amy Pond, Chiyoko	Jonathan Morris	29 June – 24 August 2011
Arriving on a spacestation, The Doctor and Amy discover time is running faster, and form an alliance with a group of intergalactic nuns – with guns. As the group is picked off one by one, the Doctor and Amy find their past adventures coming back to haunt them – and quite possibly, the whole of creation.
9	"The Child of Time"	Amy Pond, Chiyoko	Jonathan Morris	21 September – 14 December 2011
The clock is ticking, as the Doctor and Amy find themselves trying to avert Chiyoko's creation and prevent a galactic war in Earth's future. The whole universe is hanging in the balance and the time vortex is close to complete collapse. Travelling between worlds that shouldn't exist and meeting long dead souls, the Doctor and Amy's toughest adventure could prove to be their last... The end of everything is approaching, at the hands of a little girl who wants to live forever.
10	"The Chains of Olympus"	Amy Pond and Rory Williams	Scott Gray	11 January – 4 April 2012
The Doctor, Amy and Rory visit ancient Greece and meets Socrates and Plato. But all is not as it seems as an entity claiming to be Zeus unleashes the wrath of gods on its blasphemous people, whilst the Doctor discovers Socrate's legacy is built on a web of lies...
11	"Sticks & Stones"	Amy and Rory	Scott Gray	April – May 2012
As an alien graffiti artist attacks London, The Doctor discovers that the Sticks and Stones rhyme is wrong. Words can hurt you!
12	"The Cornucopia Caper"	Amy, Rory and Miss Ghost	Scott Gray	May – August 2012
The Doctor, Amy and Rory arrive in the city of Cornucopia on an unnamed planet. Cornucopia is a hive for crime where law enforcers are illegal. The Doctor and Rory are taken hostage by a gang of criminals, led by Granny Solasta. Solasta is leading an operation to raid the Bank of Heaven, every criminal's dream job, and with Rory's life at ransom, The Doctor is forced to transport them in the TARDIS. but the lust of crime soon begins to have an effect on him, whilst back in the city, Amy forms an alliance with Horatio Lynk, a professional thief.
13	"The Broken Man"	Amy and Rory, and the Lake family	Scott Gray	August – November 2012
Prague, 1989: Patrick Lake and his family are desperate to return to London, but Patrick is hiding a dark secret from his wife – he is a British spy working undercover to bring down Yuri Azarov, a man whose rise to power leaves devastation for all. Patrick finds an ally in a traveller called the Doctor, a man whose name echoes throughout history, according to Patrick's associate Hugo Wilding. But the Doctor's attempt to discover the truth leaves Patrick's family – and Rory – at the mercy of Yuri and his sinister, inhuman, sidekicks...
14	"Imaginary Enemies"	Amy and Rory	TBA	13 December 2012
15	"Hunters of the Burning Stone (50th Anniversary Special)"	Ian Chesterton, Barbara Wright and the Lake family	Scott Gray	10 January – June/July 2013
When the Doctor investigates a Sontaran timeship in Earth's orbit, he finds himself plunged into an epic battle across time, surrounding the city of Cornucopia and a mysterious women who claims to be from his past, and if that wasn't confusing enough, he is reunited with two faces from the very beginning of his long life.
16	"A Wing and a Prayer"	Clara Oswald and Amy Johnson	Scott Gray	August – October 2013
17	"Welcome to Tickle Town"	Clara Oswald	Scott Gray	September 2013
18	"Joh Smith and the Common Men"	Clara Oswald	Scott Gray	21 November 2013
19	"Pay the Piper"	Clara Oswald and the Lake family	Scott Gray	December 2013 – January 2014
20	"The Blood of Azrael"	Clara Oswald and the Lake family	Scott Gray	February – May 2014
TBA	"The Crystal Throne"	Madame Vastra, Jenny Flint and Strax	Scott Gray	26 June – 24 July 2014

=== Doctor Who Graphic Novels ===
No.	Title	Featuring	Writer	Release Date
1	"The Only Good Dalek"	Amy Pond and the Daleks	Justin Richards & Mike Collins	September 2010
Station 7 is where the Earth Forces send all the equipment captured in their unceasing war against the Daleks. It's where Dalek technology is analysed and examined. It's where the Doctor and Amy have just arrived. But somehow the Daleks have found out about Station 7 – and there's something there that they want back. With the Doctor increasingly worried about the direction the Station's research is taking, the commander of Station 7 knows he has only one possible, desperate, defence. Because the last terrible secret of Station 7 is that they don't only store captured Dalek technology. It's also a prison... and when the new Dalek empire attacks the station, a deadly war gets underway, and the Doctor uncovers a terrible secret at the heart of Planet Earth and Station 7.
2	"The Dalek Project"	Daleks	Justin Richards & Mike Collins	September 2012
It's 1917, the height of the Great War and Hellcombe Hall is a house full of mystery: locked doors, forbidden rooms, dustsheets covering guilty secrets, and ghostly noises frightening the servants. Most mysterious of all, the drawing-room seems to open directly onto a muddy, corpse-filled trench on the Western Front... Arriving at this stately home, the Doctor meets Lord Hellcombe, an armaments manufacturer who has a new secret weapon he believes will win the war: he calls it "the Dalek". Soon, the Doctor and his new friends are in a race against time to prevent the entire Western Front from becoming part of... the Dalek Project!

=== Doctor Who Adventures ===
No.	Title	Featuring	Writer	Release Date
1	"Attack of the Space Leeches!"	Amy Pond	Oli Smith	1–8 April 2010
A boy named Stephen becomes an unlikely defender of Earth when London is attacked by giant space Leeches. For Stephen, the only hope for those around him lies within a strange blue box. But why is Stephen the only one spared from the space leeches invasion?
2	"Madness on the M1!"	Amy Pond	Oli Smith	15 April 2010
It's 1951, and the Doctor and Amy are forced to deal with alien joyriders on the newly built M1 motorway.
3	"Winning Hand"	Amy Pond	Oli Smith	22 April 2010
At the Trans-Vegas Casino, the universe's most popular criminal haunt, the Doctor plays a deadly game of poker with notorious criminal, Hubert Crimp, whilst Amy leads a gang of slaves to freedom.
4	"Booked Up"	Amy Pond	Simon Guerrier	29 April 2010
Returning to the biggest library in the universe with Amy, The Doctor accidentally releases a creature from a book. Soon enough, billions of monsters from books swarm the library.
5	"Bad Vibrations"	Amy Pond	Eddie Robson	6 May 2010
A trip to the Echo Sphere and an encounter with a tribe of peaceful bird-like creatures leaves the Doctor battling his most fearsome foe yet – his own TARDIS.
6	"About Face"	Amy Pond	Steve Lyons	13 May 2010
As the Doctor and new friend Cormac battle the body-swapping Charonid on a deserted spaceship, the Time Lord remains unaware that Amy is under their spell.
7	"Track Attack"	Amy Pond	Eddie Robson	20 May 2010
In 1885, The Doctor and Amy are trapped on a train that is out of control. Averting disaster, the Doctor has a chance meeting with a Shift Agent, and discovers an even greater threat lurks on the train, a threat that could tear the Earth apart.
8	"Nowhere Man"	Amy Pond	Oli Smith	27 May 2010
When wormholes begin appearing in space, the Doctor and Amy are pulled into a mini universe, where they meet Brox, a traveller who has been voyaging in a lost universe for 100 years, desperate to find alien life. Now, Brox is dying, and the Doctor becomes determined to show him the wonders of the main universe before he does.
9	"Money Troubles"	Amy Pond	Steve Lyons	3 June 2010
The Doctor and Amy are caught up in a bank robbery on an alien planet, alongside the Doctor's old friends, the Ratlings, and the bank robbers are none other than the Doctor's old foes, the Sidewinder Syndicate.
10	"Fashion Victim"	Amy Pond	Christopher Cooper	10 June 2010
When a new craze hits present-day London, the Doctor and Amy must battle to prevent another alien invasion... of fashion.
11	"The Collector"	Amy Pond	Oli Smith	17 June 2010
The Doctor and Amy arrive at the Nebulon Colony in 3515, only to discover that the colony has been frozen for a 100 years, and the last inhabitant is determined to stop them from reviving the colony.
12	"The Stray"	Amy Pond	Eddie Robson	24 June 2010
The Doctor and Amy go undercover in order to convince an old lady that her dog is an alien parasite that intends to drain her body of life.
13	"Mistaken Identity"	Amy Pond	Cavan Scott	1 July 2010
Arriving in an alien forest, the Doctor and Amy are arrested by the Enforcers, who believe Amy is a shape-shifting fugitive known as Egron the Flesh Eater. When her attempts to escape the jungle fail and the TARDIS and even the Doctor are left powerless, Amy must prove her innocence by finding Egron.
14	"Foul Play"	Amy Pond	Steve Lyons	8 July 2010
At Wembley Stadium in 2050, the Doctor discovers someone is meddling with time, whilst an alien infiltrates the football team.
15	"Attack of the Gatebots!"	Amy Pond	Christopher Cooper	15 July 2010
After an adventure on the planet Ekthelios, Amy is arrested by the GateBot, robot ticket inspectors, whilst the Doctor uses his new position as a celebrity on the planet to save her.
16	"Blue Skies Thinking"	Amy Pond	Eddie Robson	22 July 2010
On the planet Thelka in 2495, The Doctor and Amy find themselves on the run from the population, possessed by an entity created by blue ink.
17	"Samurai's Secret"	Amy Pond	Oli Smith	29 July 2010
In 13th century Japan, the Doctor and Amy meet Shoju, a fellow traveller who has settled in a village that he has pledged to protect against evil. But as a dragon targets the village, not even the Doctor can save Shoju from a secret he has been running from since his childhood.
18	"A Mess of Trouble"	Amy Pond	Eddie Robson	5 August 2010
Posadise is a beautiful world – from space. But when the Doctor and Amy arrive, they find a planet gripped by sandstorms, and the untidy citizens, the Posadian's, are preparing to fight off an invasion... a clean sweep invasion.
19	"In the Stars"	Amy Pond	Eddie Robson	12 August 2010
It's 905 BC in Babylon, and astronomer Urtaki has discovered a new constellation. But the Doctor is suspicious – the Gryphon has been watching Earth, waiting to send their soldiers into battle.
20	"Most Haunted"	Amy Pond	Steve Lyons	19 August 2010
The ghost of a monster that was killed by a gang of angry villagers 100 years previously comes back to haunt the Doctor, Amy and schoolchildren, Kerri and Joe, as they find themselves trapped in the haunted house, Harcout Manor.
21	"The Living Storm"	Amy Pond	Steve Lyons	26 August 2010
In a ruined alien city, a vicious storm separates the Doctor and Amy from the TARDIS. To escape the city, the Doctor must fight a living storm.
22	"The Scarecrow"	Amy Pond	Eddie Robson	2 September 2010
Inside a wormhole at the other side of the universe, Major Luisa Saurez has been kidnapped by the merciless Tulokon. As the Doctor and Amy are diverted into the wormhole. The Tulokon's arch-enemy, the Hazrian's, plot revenge for the massacre of their homeworld. Can the Doctor rescue Luisa before the wormhole is plunged into darkness?
23	"Sky Scrapers"	Amy Pond	Christopher Cooper	9 September 2010
In present-day Manchester, the Doctor and Amy find the city deserted and the worm-like Alifabe roaming in the sewers, infecting the waters. As the military prepare an air-strike, the Doctor races against time to return the Alifabe home and ensure the safety of the population.
24	"The Purrfect Crime"	Amy Pond	Mark Wright	16 September 2010
In an Egyptian museum, the Doctor and Amy are chased by mummies – and discover the cat-like Sehkmets are raising millions to buy a battle fleet.
25	"The Steel Web"	Amy Pond	Steve Lyons	23 September 2010
En route to Pomarius, the TARDIS is caught in a spider's web – in space, leaving the Doctor looking for a way to free his ship from the web, maybe a farmer called Heldan can help the TARDIS and its crew...
26	"In the Can"	Amy Pond	Eddie Robson	30 September 2010
The Doctor and Amy discover that aliens are, once again, using television to conquer Earth. But the invaders are nothing like they have encountered before – They are soup creatures.
27	"Snow Globe"	Amy Pond	Christopher Cooper	7 October 2010
In Birmingham during the Ice Age, A lone Neanderthal calls upon the Doctor and Amy to find his missing tribe. But the Doctor is left furious when he discovers why the Neanderthal tribes have been suspended in ice, whilst three aliens scientists hide behind the scenes, making preparations for an invasion.
28	"Wave Machine"	Amy Pond	Trevor Baxendale	14 October 2010
The Doctor and Amy visit Smilonda, the top holiday destination of the 423rd century. But a holidaymaker called Grone feels tourists have ruined the once beautiful planet – and gets his revenge by unleashing giant metal crabs from beneath the sea.
29	"Cell Shock"	Amy Pond and Elpha	Christopher Cooper	21 October 2010
On a mysterious planet populated by robots, the Doctor and Amy find themselves in a cell – alongside Elpha, who has been kidnapped from her homeworld. Escaping, the Doctor, Amy and Elpha must close down a zoo that contains various kidnapped creatures from across the universe.
30	"The Trick"	Amy Pond	Oli Smith	28 October 2010
When the Doctor and Amy come to the rescue of a farmer and his son on Halloween, they find themselves under siege at a Texan farm, so the Doctor decides to tell a tale from his long past – the tale of the planet Thursday.
31	"The Lunar Tyk"	Amy Pond	Richard Dinnick	4 November 2010
On the moon in 2039, the Doctor and Amy meet two astronauts and accidentally set the Tyk, a creature that grows by absorbing light.
32	"Pencil Pusher"	Amy Pond	Trevor Baxendale	11 November 2010
The Doctor and Amy go undercover as school inspectors to save a schoolgirl called Janie from a shape-shifting thief from the planet Speldron, and Janie soon discovers that, when the Doctor is around, the most harmless things can be turned into the most dangerous weapons...
33	"The Cleverest King"	Amy Pond	Trevor Baxendale	18 November 2010
On Unsunru in galaxy 57, The Doctor and Amy meet Ragnorr, the crazed and lonely leader of the Kreech warriors. Ragnorr wishes to travel the stars, and now his wish has come true. But for the Doctor, the nightmare has only just begun. For someone has to replace Ragnorr as King Kreech... and that someone... is the last of the Time Lords.
34	"Seeing Things"	Amy Pond	Eddie Robson	25 November 2010
It's 1943, and Sgt Brett Cooper has been walking the Australian outback for two days. Hungry and firsty, Brett finds himself attacked by a creatured made from water – and having hallucinations about a man called the Doctor...
35	"Pirates of the Seven Seeds"	Amy Pond	Christopher Cooper	2 December 2010
Arriving in Norway in the far-future, The Doctor and Amy discover Earth has been ravaged by solar storms – and space pirates are hunting for an impossible batch of fruit – fruit created at the TARDIS's previous destination, Feltzmodo 12.
36	"Rough Waters"	Amy Pond	Trevor Baxendale	9 December 2010
37	"Red Christmas"	Amy Pond	Oli Smith	16 December 2010
38	"First, Food, First"	Amy Pond and Rory Williams	Christopher Cooper	30 December 2010
39	"Random History"	Amy and Rory	Trevor Baxendale	6 January 2011
40	"The Salt Solution"	Amy and Rory	Christopher Cooper	13 January 2011
41	"Rory's Story"	Amy and Rory	Oli Smith	20 January 2011
42	"Sub-Species"	Amy and Rory	Eddie Robson	27 January 2011
43	"Quite Interesting"	Amy and Rory	Simon Guerrier	3 February 2011
44	"Earworm"	Amy and Rory	Jason Arnopp	10 February 2011
45	"If You Go Down to the Woods Today"	Amy and Rory	Christopher Cooper	17 February 2011
46	"Ghost World"	Amy and Rory	Eddie Robson	24 February 2011
47	"Power of the Mykuootni"	Amy and Rory	Christopher Cooper	3 March 2011
48	"Mine, All Mine"	Amy and Rory	Steve Lyons	10 March 2011
49	"Golden Slumbers"	Amy and Rory	Eddie Robson	17 March 2011
50	"Sound Bytes"	Amy and Rory	Steve Lyons	24 March 2011
51	"Chasing Rainbows"	Amy and Rory	Eddie Robson	31 March 2011
52	"Pier Head from Space"	Amy and Rory	Eddie Robson	7 April 2011
53	"The Evergreen Death"	Amy and Rory	Christopher Cooper	14 April 2011
54	"The Rage"	Amy and Rory	Eddie Robson	21 April 2011
55	"The Peace Strike"	Amy and Rory	Eddie Robson	28 April 2011
56	"Extinction Event"	Amy and Rory, and Professor Saurian	Steve Lyons	5 May 2011
57	"Hot Stuff!"	Amy and Rory	Trevor Baxendale	12 May 2011
58	"The Very Cool Boe Tie"	Amy and Rory	Simon Gurrier	19 May 2011
59	"Reality Cheque"	Amy and Rory	Christopher Cooper	26 May 2011
60	"Road Rage"	Amy and Rory	Trevor Baxendale	2 June 2011
61	"The King and the Tripeberry"	Amy and Rory	Craig Donaghy	9 June 2011
62	"Danger Flight"	Amy and Rory	Trevor Baxendale	16 June 2011
63	"Dinosaurs in New York"	Amy and Rory, and Professor Saurian	Steve Lyons	23 July 2011
64	"Screamers!"	Amy and Rory	Steve Lyons	30 June 2011
65	"Grow Your Own"	Amy and Rory	Eddie Robson	7 July 2011
66	"The Golesterkol Collection"	Amy Pond	Craig Donaghy	14 July 2011
67	"Missing in Action"	Amy and Rory	Eddie Robson	21 July 2011
68	"Peril on the Sea"	Amy and Rory	Steve Lyons	28 July 2011
69	"Rock Quasar and the Mudslugs of Gurrn"	Amy and Rory	Christopher Cooper	4 August 2011
70	"Dino World"	Amy and Rory, and Professor Saurian	Steve Lyons	11 August 2011
71	"The Upper Deck"	Amy and Rory	Eddie Robson	18 August 2011
72	"The Moon of Lost Hope"	Amy and Rory	Trevor Baxendale	25 August 2011
73	"Vacuum Packed"	Amy and Rory	Christopher Cooper	1 September 2011
74	"Funny Phone Call"	Amy and Rory	Trevor Baxendale	8 September 2011
75	"The Deadly Mutant"	Amy and Rory	Trevor Baxendale	15 September 2011
76	"The Mutant Turnip"	Amy and Rory	Eddie Robson	22 September 2011
77	"The Secret Star Trail"	Amy and Rory, and Agent 99	Trevor Baxendale	29 September 2011
78	"Agent 99"	Amy and Rory, and Agent 99	Trevor Baxendale	6 October 2011
79	"Dimension Warp"	Amy and Rory, and Agent 99	Trevor Baxendale	19 October 2011
80	"The Kcrusivour Gambit"	Amy and Rory	Christopher Cooper	20 October 2011
81	"Trapped in the Pages of History"	Amy and Rory	Christopher Cooper	27 October 2011
82	"Dawn of the Living Bread"	Amy and Rory	Christopher Cooper	3 November 2011
83	"Air Force Gone"	TBA	Christopher Cooper	10 November 2011
84	"The Frankenstein Particle"	Amy and Rory	Christopher Cooper	17 November 2011
85	"Dog of War"	Amy and Rory	Eddie Robson	24 November 2011
86	"Harvest of Doom"	Amy and Rory	Eddie Robson	1 December 2011
87	"The Atomon Invasion"	Amy and Rory, and Elpha	Christopher Cooper	8 December 2011
88	"Wait Until Morning"	Amy and Rory	Eddie Robson	15 December 2011
89	"Humans Aren't Just for Christmas"	Amy and Rory	Trevor Baxendale	29 December 2011
90	"Vengeance of the Atomon"	Amy and Rory	Christopher Cooper	5–12 January 2012
91	"Picture Imperfect"	Amy and Rory	Natalie Barnes	19 January 2012
92	"The Star Serpent"	Amy and Rory	Natalie Barnes	26 January 2012
93	"The Home Store"	Amy and Rory	Eddie Robson	2 February 2012
94	"Cold Comfort"	Amy and Rory	Steve Lyons	9 February 2012
95	"Faster Than Light"	Amy and Rory	Trevor Baxendale	16 February 2012
96	"The Fairest of Them All"	Amy and Rory	Craig Donaghy	23 February 2012
97	"New and Improved"	Amy and Rory	Craig Donaghy	1 March 2012
98	"Matlhill Way"	Amy and Rory	Craig Donaghy	8 March 2012
99	"The Demons of Repton Abbey"	Amy and Rory	Craig Donaghy	March 2012
100	"The Punch & Judy Trap"	Amy and Rory	Christopher Cooper	22 March 2012
101	"Buy, Buy, Baby"	Amy and Rory	Steve Lyons	29 March 2012
102	"Ghosts of the Never-were"	Amy and Rory	Steve Lyons	5 April 2012
103	"The Parasites"	Amy and Rory	Steve Lyons	12 April 2012
104	"Doomland"	Amy and Rory	Eddie Robson	19 April 2012
105	"Buying Time"	Amy and Rory	Trevor Baxendale	26 April 2012
106	"Island of the Cyclopes"	Amy and Rory	Steve Lyons	3 May 2012
107	"Trouble on the Orion Express"	Amy and Rory	Luke Paton	10 May 2012
108	"Dummy Run"	Amy and Rory	Glen Dakin	17 May 2012
109	"Finder's Keepers"	TBA	Eddie Robson	24 May 2012
110	"The Mirror War"	Amy and Rory	Eddie Robson	31 May 2012
111	"Ghost Train"	Amy and Rory	Steve Lyons	7 June 2012
112	"I Scream"	Amy and Rory	Christopher Cooper	14 June 2012
113	"Le Tour de Death"	Amy and Rory	Christopher Cooper	21 June 2012
114	"The Sky is Falling!"	Amy and Rory	Craig Donaghy	June 2012
115	"The Time Gallery"	Amy and Rory	Glen Dakin	5 July 2012
116	"The Cliff Face"	Amy and Rory	Eddie Robson	12 July 2012
117	"Bumble of Destruction"	Amy and Rory	Craig Donaghy	19 July 2012
118	"The Light Catcher"	Amy and Rory	Christopher Cooper	26 July 2012
119	"Dungeon of the Lost"	Amy and Rory	Eddie Robson	2 August 2012
120	"The Intergalactic Trial"	Amy and Rory	Luke Paton	9 August 2012
121	"24-Hour News Invasion"	Amy and Rory	Glen Dakin	15 August 2012
122	"The Panic Room"	Amy and Rory	Glen Dakin	16 August 2012
123	"Terror from the Swamps"	Amy and Rory	Trevor Baxendale	30 August 2012
124	"The Planet That Slept"	Amy and Rory	Trevor Baxendale	September 2012
125	"Planet of the Rory's"	Amy and Rory	Craig Donaghy	September 2012
126	"Dawn of Time!"	Amy, Rory, and Daleks	Trevor Baxendale	20 September 2012
127	"TV Hell!"	Amy and Rory	Christopher Cooper	27 September 2012
128	"Pondnium"	Amy and Rory	Craig Donaghy	4 October 2012
129	"Bite of the Morphuse"	TBA	Christopher Cooper	11 October 2012
130	"Garbage Day"	TBA	Glen Dakin	18 October 2012
131	"The Greedy Gulper"	TBA	Steve Lyons	25 October 2012
132	"Meteorite Meeting"	Decky Flamboon	Craig Donaghy	November 2012
133	"Tower of Power"	Decky Flamboon	Craig Donaghy	8 November 2012
134	"The Shark Shocker"	Decky Flamboon	Craig Donaghy	15–21 November 2012
135	"The Toybox"	Decky Flamboon	Eddie Robson	22–28 November 2012
136	"The Runaway Bogey"	Decky Flamboon	Simon Guerrier	5 December 2012
137	"On the Cards"	Decky Flamboon	Eddie Robson	6 December 2012
138	"Decky the Halls"	Decky Flamboon	Craig Donaghy	13 December 2012
139	"Snowball!"	Decky Flamboon	Moray Laing	28 December 2012
140	"Museum Piece"	Decky Flamboon	Steve Lyons	4 January 2013
141	"All Change!"	Decky Flamboon	Simon Guerrier	10 January 2013
142	"An Ill Wind"	Decky Flamboon	James Hill	17 January 2013
143	"The Water World"	Decky Flamboon	Morag Laing	24 January 2013
144	"Pet Panic"	Decky Flamboon	Glen Dakin	31 January 2013
145	"Space Race"	Decky Flamboon	Steve Lyons	7 February 2013
146	"Love is in the Air"	Decky Flamboon	Craig Donaghy	14 February 2013
147	"Toothache!"	Decky Flamboon	James Hill	21 February 2013
148	"Terror in the Taj Mahal"	Decky Flamboon	Craig Donaghy	28 February 2013
149	"Eye Spy"	Decky Flamboon	Craig Donaghy	7 March 2013
150	"Colossuse of the Colosseum"	Decky Flamboon	Craig Donaghy	14 March 2013
151	"The Tail of Decky Flamboon"	Decky Flamboon	Craig Donaghy	21 March 2013
152	"The Egg Hunt"	TBA	James Hill	28 March 2013
153	"The Mystery of the Mould"	Clara Oswald	Craig Donaghy	4 April 2013
154	"The Planet That Went Backwards"	Clara Oswald	Morag Laing	11 April 2013
155	"Teacher's Pet"	Clara Oswald	Christopher Cooper	18 April 2013
156	"Coral Maze"	Clara Oswald	Glenn Dakin	25 April 2013
157	"Sandblaster"	Clara Oswald	Steve Lyons	2 May 2013
158	"Tunnel Terrors!"	Clara Oswald	James Hill	9 May 2013
159	"Nova"	Clara Oswald	Rik Hoskin	16 May 2013
160	"Line of Battle"	Clara Oswald	Eddie Robson	23 May 2013
161	"The Curse of the Gibwyn"	Clara Oswald	Craig Donaghy	4 June 2013
162	"Gumfight"	Clara Oswald	Glenn Dakin	19 June 2013
163	"The Hat Trick"	Clara Oswald	James Hill	3 July 2013
164	"Gnome Guard"	Clara Oswald	Glenn Dakin	17 July 2013
165	"Strictly Fight Monsters"	Clara Oswald	Simon Guerrier	31 July 2013
166	"Planet Void"	Clara Oswald	Christopher Cooper	14 August 2013
167	"Reprogramme"	Clara Oswald	Rik Hoskin	28 August 2013
168	"Shipwrecked"	Clara Oswald	Stevw Lyons	11 September 2013
169	"Eye of the Storm"	Clara Oswald	Eddie Robson	25 September 2013
170	"Whale Tale"	Clara Oswald	Glenn Dakin	22 October 2013
171	"Faceache"	Clara Oswald	Simon Guerrier	23 October 2013
172	"Time Trick"	Clara Oswald, First Doctor, Susan Foreman	Craig Donaghy	6 November 2013
173	"Dragon Attack"	Clara Oswald	James Hill	27 November 2013
174	"The Holly and the Ivy"	Clara Oswald	Simon Guerrier	11 December 2013
175	"By the Book"	Clara Oswald	Eddie Robson	31 December 2013
176	"Creatures from the Deep"	Clara Oswald	Simon Guerrier	15 January 2014
177	"Invaders of the Vortex"	Clara Oswald	Steve Lyons	29 January 2014
178	"A Tangled Web"	Clara Oswald	James Hill	12 February 2014
179	"Ball-Pit Beast"	Clara Oswald	Glenn Dakin	26 February 2014

=== Doctor Who (2011) ===
No.	Title	Featuring	Writer	Release Date
1	"Spam Filtered"	Amy and Rory	Tony Lee	January 2011
When Rory scrambles the TARDIS's circuits whilst online, he, the Doctor and Amy find themselves stranded on Phayke, which is due to be destroyed by the Scroungers in 1 hour... It's a race against time to repair the TARDIS and escape. But the Scroungers won't let them leave without a fight.
2	"Ripper's Curse – Part 1"	Amy and Rory, and Jack the Ripper	Tony Lee	February 2011
When the TARDIS materialises in Whitechapel in 1888, The Doctor, Amy and Rory become embroiled in the hunt for Jack the Ripper. The Doctor detects alien energy in the town and accidentally entangles himself in a murder, whilst Amy lands herself in the gravest of dangers when she becomes fixated on saving Ripper's next victim, and Rory goes undercover at Scotland Yard.
3	"Rippers Curse – Part 2"	Amy and Rory, and Jack the Ripper	Tony Lee	March 2011
With the Doctor in the frame for the murder of Elizabeth Stride, Rory's loyalty to him is tested to the limit. But a bigger threat than Jack the Ripper lurks in Whitechapel, a threat to the fabric of time itself, whilst Amy's quest to save lives threatens everyone else's.
4	"Rippers Curse – Part 3"	Amy and Rory, and Jack the Ripper	Tony Lee	April 2011
The Doctor and Rory arrive in present-day Whitechapel to discover Jack the Ripper killed at least twelve women – including Amy. As history changes around them, the Doctor and Rory must race against time before Amy's death in 1888 becomes fixed in time. But as the travellers dig for answers, the Doctor makes an alarming discover. Could Jack the Ripper be a War Lord from across the universe?
5	"A Fairytale Life"	Amy	Lilah Sturges	April – July 2011
6	"They Think It's All Over"	Amy and Rory	Tony Lee	May 2011
7	"When Worlds Collide"	Amy, Rory and Kevin, and Sontarans	Tony Lee	July – August 2011
8	"San Diego Convention Special"	Amy and Rory	Matthew Dow Smith	July 2011
9	"Run, Doctor, Run"	TBA	Joshua Hale Fialkov	2011
10	"Down to Earth"	TBA	Matthew Dow Smith	2011
11	"Tuesday"	Amy and Rory	Dan McDaid	2011
12	"Your Destiny Awaits"	Amy, Rory and Kevin	Tony Lee	2011
13	"Space Squid"	Amy, Rory and Kevin	Tony Lee	September 2011
14	"Body Snatched"	Amy and Rory	Tony Lee	October – November 2011
15	"Silent Knight"	Amy, Rory and Santa	Tony Lee	December 2011

=== Doctor Who Annuals ===
No.	Title	Featuring	Writer	Release Date
1	"Buzz!"	Amy and Rory	Oli Smith	2010
2	"The Grey Hole"	Amy	Trevor Baxendale	2010
3	"Attack of the 50ft Rory"	Amy and Rory	Kieran Grant	2011
4	"The House of Lights"	Amy and Rory	Kieran Grant	2011
5	"The Zentrabot Invasion"	Danny And Abby	Jason Loborik	2012
6	"The Tomb of Shemura"	Danny and Abby	Jason Loborik	2012
7	"The Girl Who Loved Doctor Who"	Ally	Paul Cornell	2013

=== Titan Comics ===
#	Title	Featuring	Writer	Artist	Cover date
Doctor Who: The Eleventh Doctor
1	After Life	Alice Obiefune	Al Ewing & Rob Williams	Simon Fraser	August 2014
2	The Friendly Place	Alice Obiefune	Al Ewing	Simon Fraser	September 2014
3	What He Wants...	Alice Obiefune and John Jones	Rob Williams	Simon Fraser	October 2014
4	Whodunnit	Alice Obiefune, John Jones and ARC	Al Ewing	Boo Cook	Early November 2014
5	The Sound of Our Voices	Alice Obiefune, John Jones and ARC	Al Ewing	Boo Cook	December 2014
6	Space in Dimension Relative and Time	Alice Obiefune, John Jones and ARC	Rob Williams	Simon Fraser	December 2014
7	The Eternal Dogfight	Alice Obiefune, John Jones and ARC	Rob Williams	Warren Pleece	February 2015
8	The Infinite Astronaut	Alice Obiefune, John Jones and ARC	Al Ewing	Warren Pleece	March 2015
9	The Rise and Fall	Alice Obiefune, John Jones and ARC	Al Ewing	Boo Cook	April 2015
10	The Other Doctor	Alice Obiefune, John Jones and ARC	Rob Williams	Simon Fraser	Late April 2015
11	Four Dimensions	Alice Obiefune, John Jones and ARC	Al Ewing	Boo Cook	May 2015
12	Conversion Part 1	Alice Obiefune, John Jones and ARC	Rob Williams	Warren Pleece	June 2015
13	Conversion Part 2	Alice Obiefune, John Jones and ARC	Rob Williams	Warren Pleece	July 2015
14	The Comfort of the Good Part 1	Alice Obiefune, John Jones and ARC	Al Ewing & Rob Williams	Simon Fraser	August 2015
15	The Comfort of the Good Finale	Alice Obiefune, John Jones and ARC	Al Ewing & Rob Williams	Simon Fraser	September 2015
Doctor Who: The Eleventh Doctor Year Two
1	The Then and the Now Part 1 of 2	Alice Obiefune and The Squire	Si Spurrier & Rob Williams	Simon Fraser	October 2015
2	The Then and the Now Part 2 of 2	Alice Obiefune, The Squire and Abslom Daak	Si Spurrier & Rob Williams	Simon Fraser	November 2015
3	Pull to Open	Alice Obiefune, The Squire and Abslom Daak	Si Spurrier	Simon Fraser	January 2016
4	Outrun	Alice Obiefune, The Squire and Abslom Daak	Rob Williams	Warren Pleece	Late January 2016
5	The Judas Goatee	Alice Obiefune, The Squire and Abslom Daak	Si Spurrier	Warren Pleece	February 2016
6	The One Part 1 of 2	Alice Obiefune, The Squire, Abslom Daak and River Song	Rob Williams	Simon Fraser	March 2016
7	The One Part 2 of 2	Alice Obiefune, The Squire, Abslom Daak and River Song	Rob Williams	Leandro Casco & Simon Fraser	April 2016
8	Downtime	Alice Obiefune, The Squire, Abslom Daak and River Song	Si Spurrier	Warren Pleece	April 2016
9	Running to Stay Still	Alice Obiefune, The Squire, Abslom Daak and River Song	Si Spurrier	Leandro Casco	June 2016
10	First Rule	Alice Obiefune, The Squire, Abslom Daak, War Doctor and The Master	Rob Williams	Simon Fraser	July 2016
11	The Organ Grinder	Alice Obiefune, War Doctor, The Master and The Squire	Si Spurrier	I. N. J. Culbard	August 2016
12	Kill God	Alice Obiefune, War Doctor, The Master and The Squire	Rob Williams	I. N. J. Culbard	September 2016
13	Fast Asleep	Alice Obiefune, Abslom Daak, River Song, War Doctor, The Master and The Squire	Rob Williams	I. N. J. Culbard & Simon Fraser	October 2016
14	Gently Pulls the Strings	Alice Obiefune, Abslom Daak, River Song and The Squire	Si Spurrier	Simon Fraser	November 2016
15	Physician, Heal Thyself	Alice Obiefune, Abslom Daak, River Song and The Squire	Si Spurrier & Rob Williams	Simon Fraser	December 2016
Doctor Who: The Eleventh Doctor Year Three
1	Remembrance	Alice Obiefune	Rob Williams	I. N. J. Culbard	February 2017
2	The Scream	Alice Obiefune, John Jones and The Sapling	Rob Williams	Leandro Casco & Wellington Diaz	March 2017
3	The Tragical History Tour Part One	Alice Obiefune and The Sapling	Alex Paknadel	Simon Fraser	April 2017
4	The Tragical History Tour Part Two	Alice Obiefune and The Sapling	Alex Paknadel	Simon Fraser	May 2017
5	Time of the Ood	Alice Obiefune and The Sapling	James Peaty	I. N. J. Culbard	June 2017
6	The Memory Feast Part One of Two	Alice Obiefune and The Sapling	George Mann	I. N. J. Culbard	July 2017
7	The Memory Feast Part Two of Two; Something Borrowed	Alice Obiefune and The Sapling	George Mann; Vince Pavey	I. N. J. Culbard; Pasquale Qualano	August 2017
8	Fooled	Alice Obiefune and The Sapling	George Mann	Ivan Rodriguez, Wellington Diaz, Klebs Junior & Leandro Casco	September 2017
9	Strange Loops Part One of Two	Alice Obiefune and The Sapling	Alex Paknadel	I. N. J. Culbard	September 2017
10	The Lost Dimension Part Four of Eight	Alice Obiefune	Nick Abadzis	Leandro Casco & JB Bastos	October 2017
11	Strange Loops Part Two of Two	Alice Obiefune and The Sapling	Alex Paknadel	I. N. J. Culbard	November 2017
12	Hungry Thirsty Roots Part One of Two	Alice Obiefune and The Sapling	Alex Paknadel & Rob Williams	Ivan Rodriguez, JB Bastos & Luiz Campanello	December 2017
13	Hungry Thirsty Roots Part Two of Two	Alice Obiefune and The Sapling	Alex Paknadel & Rob Williams	JB Bastos & Luiz Campanello	February 2018

== Short stories ==
=== Doctor Who Annuals ===
No.	Title	Featuring	Writer	Release Date
1	"Secret of Arkatron"	Amy Pond	Justin Richards	2010
2	"Rory's Adventure"	Rory Williams, The Boy and Amy	Justin Richards	2011
3	"Amy's Escapade"	Amy	Justin Richards	2011
2	"Lorna's Escape"	Lorna Bucket with the Doctor	Jason Loberik	2012

== See also ==
- Star Trek: The Next Generation/Doctor Who: Assimilation2
- List of Doctor Who comic stories
- First Doctor comic stories
- Second Doctor comic stories
- Third Doctor comic stories
- Fourth Doctor comic strips
- Fifth Doctor comic stories
- Sixth Doctor comic stories
- Eighth Doctor comic stories
- War Doctor comic stories
- Ninth Doctor comic stories
- Tenth Doctor comic stories
- Twelfth Doctor comic stories
