= Sixth Doctor comic stories =

The Sixth Doctor comic stories is a range of off-screen adventures featuring the sixth incarnation of the Doctor, the protagonist of the hit sci-fi series Doctor Who. Continuing the themes of the televised series, every story sees the Doctor travelling to a new destination and fighting evil and righting wrongs.

== History ==
DWM launched the Sixth Doctor's comic strip adventures with the Doctor travelling on his own. His first story introduced a new companion, Frobisher — the shape-changing Whifferdill who often assumed the form of a penguin. Image rights were later obtained for Nicola Bryant, which allowed Peri to become the first humanoid televised companion regularly used in the pages of DWM. The writers even went to the trouble of trying to explain her earlier absence. Apparently, she took time away from the TARDIS to explore New York City. Since she remained the companion up to the final story of the regular run, the 1980s Sixth Doctor comics all happened somewhere between The Twin Dilemma and Mindwarp.

Because the Sixth Doctor's era began at the end of season 21, and the Seventh Doctor's DWM start was delayed by Grant Morrison's epic death-of-Jamie McCrimmon story line, the Sixth Doctor's regular era in DWM comics contains significantly more stories than his televised run. Moreover, he has a few additional stories which were published after Colin Baker was no longer incumbent in the role.

Nevertheless, the Sixth Doctor has one of the briefer comic canons of all the Doctors, with only the Fifth Doctor and Ninth Doctor appearing in fewer total comic stories.

== Comics ==
=== Doctor Who Magazine ===
| No. | Title | Featuring | Written by | Release date |
|---|---|---|---|---|
| 1 | "The Shape Shifters" | Frobisher | Steve Parkhouse | May - June 1984 |
| 2 | "Voyager" | Frobisher, and the Time Lords | Steve Parkhouse | July - November 1984 |
| 3 | "Polly the Glot" | Frobisher, and Dr Ivan Asimoff | Steve Parkhouse | December 1984 - February 1985 |
| 4 | "Once Upon a Time Lord" | Frobisher | Steve Parkhouse | March - APril 1985 |
| 5 | "War Game" | Frobisher | Alan McKenzie | May - June 1985 |
| 6 | "Funhouse" | Frobisher | Alan McKenzie | July - August 1985 |
| 7 | "Kane's Story (Part 1 of 4)" | Frobisher and Peri Brown | Alan McKenzie | September 1985 |
| 8 | "Abel's Story (Part 2 of 4)" | Frobisher and Peri | Alan McKenzie | October 1985 |
| 9 | "The Warriors Story (Part 3 of 4)" | Frobisher and Peri | Alan McKenzie | November 1985 |
| 10 | "Frobisher's Story (Part 4 of 4)" | Frobisher and Peri | Alan McKenzie | December 1985 |
| 11 | "Exodus (Part 1 of 3)" | Frobisher and Peri, and the Cybermen | Alan McKenzie | January 1986 |
| 12 | "Revelation (Part 2 of 3)" | Frobisher and Peri, and the Cybermen | Alan McKenzie | February 1986 |
| 13 | "Genesis (Part 3 of 3)" | Frobisher and Peri, and the Cybermen | Alan McKenzie | March 1986 |
| 14 | "Nature of the Beast" | Frobisher and Peri | Simon Furman | April - June 1986 |
| 15 | "Time Bomb" | Frobisher and Peri | Jamie Delano | July - September 1986 |
| 16 | "Salad Daze" | Peri | Simon Furman | October 1986 |
| 17 | "Changes" | Frobisher and Peri | Grant Morrison | November - December 1986 |
| 18 | "Profit of Doom" | Frobisher and Peri | Mike Collins | January - March 1987 |
| 19 | "The Gift" | Frobisher and Peri | Jamie Delano | April - July 1987 |
| 20 | "The World Shapers" | Frobisher, Peri, Jamie McCrimmon and the Cybermen | Grant Morrison | August - October 1987 |

=== Graphic novels ===
| No. | Title | Featuring | Written by | Release date |
|---|---|---|---|---|
| 1 | "The Age of Chaos" | Frobisher and Peri | Colin Baker | October 1994 |

== Short stories ==
=== Doctor Who annuals ===
| No. | Title | Featuring | Written by | Release date |
|---|---|---|---|---|
| 1 | "Battle Planet" | Peri | TBA | 1985 |
| 2 | "Day of the Dragon" | Peri | TBA | 1985 |
| 3 | "The Real Hereward" | Peri | TBA | 1985 |
| 4 | "The Deadly Weed" | Peri | TBA | 1985 |
| 5 | "Vorton's Revenge" | Peri | TBA | 1985 |
| 6 | "The Time Savers" | Peri, the Master | TBA | 1985 |
| 7 | "The Mystery of the Rings" | Peri | TBA | 1985 |
| 8 | "The Fellowship of Quan" | Peri, the Master | TBA | 1986 |
| 9 | "Time Wake" | Peri | TBA | 1986 |
| 10 | "Interface" | Peri | TBA | 1986 |
| 11 | "Beauty and the Beast" | Peri | TBA | 1986 |
| 12 | "Retribution" | Peri | TBA | 1986 |
| 13 | "Davarrk's Experiment" | Peri | TBA | 1986 |
| 14 | "The Radio Waves" | Peri, the Master | TBA | 1986 |

== See also ==
- List of Doctor Who comic stories
- First Doctor comic stories
- Second Doctor comic stories
- Third Doctor comic stories
- Fourth Doctor comic strips
- Fifth Doctor comic stories
- Eighth Doctor comic stories
- War Doctor comic stories
- Ninth Doctor comic stories
- Tenth Doctor comic stories
- Eleventh Doctor comic stories
- Twelfth Doctor comic stories
