= List of Twelfth Doctor comic stories =

Doctor Who comic series

The Twelfth Doctor comic stories consisted of several regularly published titles: Doctor Who Magazine, Doctor Who Adventures and Doctor Who: The Twelfth Doctor from Titan Comics.

== Comics ==
=== Doctor Who Magazine ===
| # | Title | Featuring | Writer | Release date |
|---|---|---|---|---|
| 1 | "The Eye of Torment" | Clara Oswald | Scott Gray | August 2014 |
| 2 | "The Instruments of War" | Clara Oswald | Mike Collins | December 2014-February 2015 |
| 3 | "Space Invaders!" | Clara Oswald | Mark Wright | March 2015 |
| 4 | "Blood and Ice" | Clara Oswald | Jacqueline Rayner | April–June 2015 |
| 5 | "Spirits of the Jungle" | Clara Oswald | Jonathan Morris | 23 July-17 September 2015 |
| 6 | "The Highgate Horror" | Clara Oswald | Mark Wright | 15 October-12 November 2015 |
| 7 | "The Dragon Lord" | Clara Oswald | Steve Lyons | 10 December 2015 – 7 January 2016 |
| 8 | "Theatre of the Mind" | Clara Oswald | TBA | TBA |
| 9 | "Witch Hunt" | Clara Oswald | Jacqueline Rayner | TBA |
| 10 | "The Stockbridge Showdown" | Maxwell Edison | Scott Gray | 26 May 2016 |
| 11 | "The Pestilent Heart" | Jess Collins and Her Family | Mark Wright | 30 June 2016 |
| 12 | "Moving In" | Jess Collins and Her Family | Mark Wright | TBA |
| 13 | "Bloodsport" | Jess Collins and Her Family | Mark Wright | TBA |
| 14 | "Be Forgot" | Jess Collins and Her Family | Mark Wright | TBA |
| 15 | "Doorway to Hell" | Jess Collins and Her Family | Mark Wright | TBA |
| 16 | "The Soul Garden" | Bill Potts | Scott Gray | 4 May-29 July 2017 |
| 17 | "The Parliament of Fear" | Bill Potts | Scott Gray | 27 July-21 September 2017 |
| 18 | "Matildus" | Bill Potts | Scott Gray | 19 October 2017 |
| 19 | "The Phantom Piper" | Bill Potts | Scott Gray | 16 November 2017 – 8 March 2018 |
| 20 | "The Clockwise War" | Bill Potts | Scott Gray | 5 April - Present |

=== Doctor Who Adventures ===
==== Immediate Media Company ====
| # | Title | Featuring | Writer | Release date |
|---|---|---|---|---|
| 1 | "Road Rage" | Clara Oswald | Craig Donaghy | 13 August 2014 |
| 2 | "Chime Time" | Clara Oswald | Craig Donaghy | 27 August 2014 |
| 3 | "Once Bitten" | Clara Oswald | Andrew Cartmel | 10 September 2014 |
| 4 | "Crash Landing" | Clara Oswald | James Hill | 24 September 2014 |
| 5 | "The Court of Birds" | Clara Oswald | Simon Guerrier | 8 October 2014 |
| 6 | "More Than Meets the Eye" | Clara Oswald | Richard Cookson | 22 October 2014 |
| 7 | "Witch Work" | Clara Oswald | Andrew Cartmel | 5 November 2014 |
| 8 | "Gift Snatched!" | Clara Oswald | James Hill | 3 December 2014 |
| 9 | "Petrified" | Clara Oswald | Andrew Cartmel | 31 December 2014 |
| 10 | "The Wheelers" | Clara Oswald | Richard Cookson | 28 January 2015 |
| 11 | "Five a Day" | Clara Oswald | Simon Guerrier | 25 February 2015 |
| 12 | "The Very Hungry Snake" | Clara Oswald | Simon Guerrier | 25 March 2015 |

==== Panini ====
| # | Title | Featuring | Writer | Release date |
|---|---|---|---|---|
| 1 | "Empire's Fall" | Clara Oswald | Russ Leach | 23 April 2015 |
| 2 | "The Big Hush" | Clara Oswald | Jason Quinn | 21 May 2015 |
| 3 | "Doctor in a Bottle" | Clara Oswald | Jason Quinn | 18 June 2015 |
| 4 | "Doctor on the Menu" | Clara Oswald | Jason Quinn | 16 July 2015 |
| 5 | "Trust" | Clara Oswald | Jason Quinn | 13 August 2015 |
| 6 | "Hyperballad" | Clara Oswald | James Peaty | 10 September 2015 |
| 7 | "Beauty Sleep" | Clara Oswald | Jason Quinn | 8 October 2015 |
| 8 | "Time and PR in Space" | Clara Oswald | Kieron Moore | 5 November 2015 |
| 9 | "The Ministry of Time" | Athena | Tommy Donbavand | 3 December 2015 |
| 10 | "Big in Japan" | | James Peaty | 7 January 2016 |
| 11 | "The Spice Route" | | Jason Quinn | 4 February 2016 |
| 12 | "Ghosts of the Seas" | George V | Kieron Moore | 3 March 2016 |
| 13 | "Shock Horror" | | Tommy Donbavand | 31 March 2016 |
| 14 | "Sky Manor" | | Kieron Moore | 28 April 2016 |
| 15 | "Petals" | | Rik Hoskin | 29 May 2016 |
| 16 | "Gallery" | | Rik Hoskin | 25 June 2016 |
| 17 | "Pirates of Vourakis" | | James Peaty | 21 July 2016 |
| 18 | "From the Horse's Mouth" | Jata | Andrew Cartmel | 19 August 2016 |
| 19 | "Fear Buds" | Jata | Andrew Cartmel | 15 September 2016 |
| 20 | "Royal Wedding" | Jata | Andrew Cartmel | 10 November 2016 |
| 21 | "Night of the Worms" | Jata | Andrew Cartmel | 5 January 2017 |
| 22 | "Wings of the Predator" | Jata | Andrew Cartmel | 2 March 2017 |
| 23 | "Keller App" | Jata | Andrew Cartmel | 27 April 2017 |
| 24 | "A Cold Snap" | Gaz | James Hill | 22 June 2017 |

=== Titan Comics ===
| # | Title | Featuring | Writer | Release date |
|---|---|---|---|---|
| 1 | "Terrorformer" | Clara Oswald | Robbie Morrison | 15 October-12 November 2014 |
| 2 | "The Swords of Kali" | Clara Oswald | Robbie Morrison | 10 December 2014 – 25 February 2015 |
| 3 | "The Fractures" | Clara Oswald, Osgood, Kate Stewart and UNIT | Robbie Morrison | 18 March-3 June 2015 |
| 4 | "Gangland" | Clara Oswald | Robbie Morrison | 1–29 July 2015 |
| 5 | "Unearthly Things" | Clara Oswald | George Mann | 9 September 2015 |
| 6 | "The Hyperion Empire" | Clara Oswald | Robbie Morrison | 30 September-24 December 2015 |
| 7 | "Relative Dimensions" | Clara Oswald | George Mann and Cavan Scott | 9 December 2015 |
| 8 | "Clara Oswald and the School of Death" | Clara Oswald and Sea Devils | Robbie Morrison | 6 January-6 April 2016 |
| 9 | "The Fourth Wall" | Clara Oswald and the Boneless | Robbie Morrison | 11 May 2016 |
| 10 | "The Twist" | Hattie Monroe | George Mann | 25 May-10 August 2016 |
| 11 | "Playing House" | Hattie Monroe | George Mann | 28 September-19 October 2016 |
| 12 | "Terror of the Cabinet Noir" | Julie d'Aubingny | Robbie Morrison | 16 November 2016 – 11 January 2017 |
| 13 | "Invasion of the Mindmorphs" | Val Kent and Sonny Robinson | Robbie Morrison | 1 February-22 March 2017 |
| 14 | "Beneath the Waves" | Hattie Monroe | George Mann | 12 April-7 June 2017 |
| 15 | "The Boy with the Displaced Smile" | | James Peaty | 26 April 2017 |
| 16 | "The Wolves of Winter" | Bill Potts, Fenric, Haemovores, the Flood and Ice Warriors | Richard Dinnick | 5 July 2017 |
| 17 | "The Lost Dimension" | Josie Day, Rose Tyler, Captain Jack Harkness, Gabby Gonzalez, Cindy Wu, Alice Obiefune, Nardole, Bill Potts, the First Doctor, the Second Doctor, the Third Doctor, the Fourth Doctor, the Fifth Doctor, the Sixth Doctor, the Seventh Doctor, the Eighth Doctor, the War Doctor, the Ninth Doctor, the Tenth Doctor and the Eleventh Doctor | George Mann and Cavan Scott | 30 August-1 November 2017 |
| 18 | "The Great Shopping Bill" | Bill Potts and Nardole | Richard Dinnick | 15 November 2017 |
| 19 | "A Confusion of Angels" | Bill Potts and Nardole | Richard Dinnick | 6 December 2017 |

=== Summer Events ===
| Title | Featuring | Writer | Release date |
|---|---|---|---|
| Four Doctors | Gabby Gonzalez, Cindy Wu, Alice Obiefune, Clara Oswald, the Tenth Doctor and the Eleventh Doctor | Paul Cornell | 2015 |
| Supremacy of the Cybermen | Rose Tyler, Captain Jack Harkness, Gabby Gonzalez, Cindy Wu, Alice Obiefune, the Ninth Doctor, the Tenth Doctor and the Eleventh Doctor | George Mann and Cavan Scott | 2016 |

=== Doctor Who Annuals ===
| # | Title | Featuring | Writer | Release date |
|---|---|---|---|---|
| 1 | "The Monsters of Coal Hill School" | Clara Oswald | Moray Laing | 2014 |
| 2 | "Freeze" | Clara Oswald | Jason Loborik | 2014 |
| 3 | "Zorgo the Terrible" | Clara Oswald | TBA | 1 October 2015 |
| 4 | "Super Gran" | Clara Oswald | TBA | 1 October 2015 |
| 5 | "Elephant in the Room" | Probosco | Paul Lang | 2016 |
| 6 | "The Promise" | | Paul Lang | 2016 |
| 7 | "Loose in the Lane" | Bill Potts And Nardole | Paul Lang | 2017 |
| 8 | "Missy Loves Ghostie" | Grant/The Ghost | Paul Lang | 2017 |

== See also ==
- List Of Doctor Who Comic Stories
- First Doctor Comic Stories
- Second Doctor Comic Stories
- Third Doctor Comic Stories
- Fourth Doctor Comic Strips
- Fifth Doctor Comic Stories
- Sixth Doctor Comic Stories
- Eighth Doctor Comic Stories
- Ninth Doctor Comic Stories
- Tenth Doctor Comic Stories
- Eleventh Doctor Comic Stories
