= List of non-televised Second Doctor stories =

In addition to the televised episodes of Doctor Who starring Patrick Troughton, the Second Doctor has appeared in a number of spin-off media.

== Audio dramas ==
- Fear of the Daleks (an adventure related by the character Zoe) (2007)
- Helicon Prime (an adventure related by the character Jamie) (2007)
- The Great Space Elevator (an adventure related by the character Victoria) (2008)
- Resistance (an adventure related by the character Polly) (2009)
- The Glorious Revolution (an adventure related by the character Jamie) (2009)
- The Three Companions (an adventure related by the character Polly)
- The Emperor of Eternity (an adventure related by the characters Jamie & Victoria) (2010)
- Echoes of Grey (an adventure related by the character Zoe) (2010)
- Prison in Space (an adventure related by the characters Jamie & Zoe) (2010)
- The Forbidden Time (an adventure related by the characters Polly & Jamie) (2011)
- Tales from the Vault (a short adventure related by the character Zoe) (2011)
- The Memory Cheats (an adventure related by the character Zoe) (2011)
- The Rosemariners (an adventure related by the characters Jamie & Zoe) (2012)
- The Selachian Gambit (an adventure related by the characters Polly & Jamie) (2012)
- The Jigsaw War (an adventure related by the character Jamie) (2012)
- The Uncertainty Principle (an adventure related by the character Zoe) (2012)
- Destiny of the Doctor: Shadow of Death (an adventure related by the character Jamie) (2013)
- The Light at the End (portrayed by Frazer Hines) (2013)
- House of Cards (an adventure related by the characters Polly & Jamie) (2013)
- The Apocalypse Mirror (an adventure related by the characters Jamie & Zoe) (2013)
- The Queen of Time (an adventure related by the characters Jamie & Zoe) (2013)
- Lords of the Red Planet (an adventure related by the characters Jamie & Zoe) (2013)
- The Dying Light (an adventure related by the characters Jamie & Zoe) (2013)
- Second Chances (an adventure related by the character Zoe) (2014)
- The Yes Men (an adventure related by the characters Polly, Ben & Jamie) (2015)
- The Forsaken (an adventure related by the characters Polly, Ben & Jamie) (2015)
- The Black Hole (an adventure related by the characters Jamie & Victoria) (2015)
- The Isos Network (an adventure related by the characters Jamie & Zoe) (2015)
- The Night's Witches (an adventure related by the characters Polly, Ben & Jamie) (2017)
- The Outliers (an adventure related by the characters Polly, Ben & Jamie) (2017)
- The Morton Legacy (an adventure related by the characters Polly, Ben & Jamie) (2017)
- The Wreck of the World (an adventure related by the characters Jamie & Zoe) (2017)

== Short Trips audios ==
- A Stain of Red in the Sand
- The Way Forward
- Seven to One
- The Five Dimensional Man
- Penny Wise, Pound Foolish

== Novels and short stories ==
=== Virgin New Adventures ===
- Timewyrm: Apocalypse by Nigel Robinson (brief flashback to the Second Doctor's era; the Seventh Doctor also interacts with his 'memory' of his second incarnation's personality, manifesting to him via the TARDIS telepathic circuits)

=== Virgin Missing Adventures ===
- The Menagerie by Martin Day
- Invasion of the Cat-People by Gary Russell
- Twilight of the Gods by Christopher Bulis
- The Dark Path by David A. McIntee

=== Past Doctor Adventures ===
- The Murder Game by Steve Lyons
- The Roundheads by Mark Gatiss
- Dreams of Empire by Justin Richards
- The Final Sanction by Steve Lyons
- Heart of TARDIS by Dave Stone (Also features the Fourth Doctor, although neither Doctor meets the other, each Doctor simply tackling a different end of the same crisis with only the Fourth aware of his other self's involvement)
- Independence Day by Peter Darvill-Evans (brief appearance only; predominately Seventh Doctor novel)
- Dying in the Sun by Jon de Burgh Miller
- Combat Rock by Mick Lewis
- The Colony of Lies by Colin Brake (brief interaction with the Seventh Doctor in a virtual reality)
- The Indestructible Man by Simon Messingham
- World Game by Terrance Dicks (depicts a possible beginning for the 'Season 6B' theory)

=== Eighth Doctor Adventures ===
- The Eight Doctors by Terrance Dicks
- Seen in the TARDIS mirror in Camera Obscura

=== Telos Doctor Who novellas ===
- Foreign Devils by Andrew Cartmel
- Wonderland by Mark Chadbourn

=== BBC Books ===
- The Wheel of Ice by Stephen Baxter

=== Penguin Fiftieth Anniversary eBook novellas ===
- The Nameless City by Michael Scott

== Comics ==
=== TV Comic ===
- The Extortioners
- The Trodos Ambush
- The Doctor Strikes Back
- The Zombies
- Master of the Spiders
- The Exterminator
- The Monsters from the Past
- The TARDIS Worshippers
- Space War Two
- Egyptian Escapade
- The Coming of the Cybermen
- The Faithful Rocket Pack
- Flower Power
- The Witches
- Cyber-Mole
- The Sabre Toothed Gorillas
- The Cyber Empire
- The Dyrons
- Dr. Who and the Space Pirates
- Car of the Century
- The Jokers
- Invasion of the Quarks
- The Killer Wasps
- Ice Cape Terror
- Jungle of Doom
- Father Time
- Martha the Mechanical Housemaid
- The Duellists
- Eskimo Joe
- Perils at 60 Fathoms
- Operation Wurlitzer
- Action in Exile
- The Mark of Terror
- The Brotherhood
- U.F.O.
- The Night Walkers

=== TV Comic Specials ===
- Barnabus
- Jungle Adventures
- Return of the Witches
- Masquerade
- The Champion
- The Entertainer

=== TV Comic Annuals ===
- Attack of the Daleks
- Pursued by the Trods
- The Time Museum
- The Electrodes
- Death Race
- Test Flight

=== Doctor Who Magazine ===
- Land of the Blind

=== Doctor Who Magazine Specials ===
- Bringer of Darkness

=== IDW series ===
- The Forgotten
- Prisoners of Time
