= List of non-televised Third Doctor stories =

In addition to the televised episodes of Doctor Who starring Jon Pertwee, the Third Doctor has appeared in a number of spin-off media.

== Stage play ==
- Doctor Who – The Ultimate Adventure

== Radio ==
- The Paradise of Death
- The Ghosts of N-Space

== Audio books ==
- Freedom
- Degrees of Truth

== Audio dramas ==
- Zagreus (cameo appearance) (1999)
- The Blue Tooth (adventure related by the character Liz Shaw) (2007)
- Old Soldiers (adventure related by the character Brigadier Lethbridge-Stewart) (2007)
- The Doll of Death (adventure related by the character Jo Grant) (2008)
- The Magician's Oath (adventure related by the character Mike Yates) (2009)
- The Prisoner of Peladon (adventure related by the King of Peladon) (2009)
- Shadow of the Past (adventure related by the character Liz Shaw) (2010)
- The Time Vampire (adventure related by the character Leela) (cameo appearance) (2010)
- Find and Replace (adventure related by the characters Jo Grant & Iris Wildthyme) (2010)
- The Sentinels of the New Dawn (adventure related by the character Liz Shaw) (2011)
- Tales from the Vault (short adventure related by the character Jo Grant) (2011)
- The Mists of Time (adventure related by the character Jo Grant) *free download with Doctor Who Magazine # 411 (2011)
- The Three Companions (adventure related by the character Brigadier Lethbridge-Stewart) (2011)
- The Many Deaths of Jo Grant (adventure related by the character Jo Grant) (2011)
- Binary (adventure related by the character Liz Shaw) (2012)
- The Rings of Ikiria (adventure related by the character Mike Yates) (2012)
- The Last Post (adventure related by the character Liz Shaw) (2012)
- Destiny of the Doctor: Vengeance of the Stones (adventure related by the character Mike Yates) (2013)
- The Schorchies (adventure related by the character Jo Grant) (2013)
- Council of War (adventure related by the character Sergeant Benton) (2013)
- Ghost in the Machine (adventure related by the character Jo Grant) (2013)
- The Light at the End (cameo appearance) (2013)
- The Mega (adventure related by the characters Jo Grant & Mike Yates) (2013)
- Doctor Who: The Third Doctor Adventures Volume 1 (adventures related by the characters Jo Grant & Mike Yates) (2015)
  - Prisoners of the Lake
  - The Havoc of Empires
- Doctor Who: The Third Doctor Adventures Volume 2 (adventures related by the character Jo Grant) (2016)
  - The Transcendence of Ephros
  - The Hidden Realm
- Doctor Who: The Third Doctor Adventures Volume 3 (adventures related by the character Jo Grant) (2017)
  - The Conquest of Fear
  - Storm of the Horofax
- Doctor Who: The Third Doctor Adventures Volume 4 (adventures related by the character Jo Grant) (2017)
  - The Rise of the New Humans
  - The Tyrants of Logic

=== Short Trips audios ===
- A True Gentleman
- Walls of Confinement
- Seven to One
- Pop Up
- Lost in the Wakefield Triangle
- Time Tunnel
- The Other Woman
- The Blame Game
- Gardeners World
- Landbound

=== Subscriber Short Trips ===
- The Switching
- Neptune
- A Home From Home
- Sphinx Lightning
- The Christmas Dimension

=== Unbound alternative Third Doctors ===
- David Warner
  - Sympathy for the Devil
  - Masters of War
  - The New Adventures of Bernice Summerfield: The Unbound Universe
  - The New Adventures of Bernice Summerfield: The Ruler of the Universe
- Arabella Weir
  - Exile

== Novels and short stories ==
=== BBC Books original ===
- The Face of the Enemy by David A. McIntee
- Harvest of Time by Alastair Reynolds

=== Virgin New Adventures ===
- Timewyrm: Genesys by John Peel (The Seventh Doctor briefly allows the Third's personality to take control of him)
- Timewyrm: Revelation by Paul Cornell (Appears in the Doctor's mind)
- All-Consuming Fire by Andy Lane (cameo appearance)

=== Virgin Missing Adventures ===
- State of Change by Christopher Bulis (The Sixth Doctor allows the Third's personality to take control for a time)
- The Ghosts of N-Space by Barry Letts
- Dancing the Code by Paul Leonard
- The Eye of the Giant by Christopher Bulis
- The Scales of Injustice by Gary Russell
- Speed of Flight by Paul Leonard

=== Past Doctor Adventures ===
- The Devil Goblins from Neptune by Martin Day and Keith Topping
- Catastrophea by Terrance Dicks
- The Wages of Sin by David A. McIntee
- Last of the Gaderene by Mark Gatiss
- Verdigris by Paul Magrs
- The Quantum Archangel by Craig Hinton (Alternate version; appears in an alternate timeline with the Sixth Doctor's companion Melanie Bush)
- Rags by Mick Lewis
- Amorality Tale by David Bishop
- The Suns of Caresh by Paul Saint
- Deadly Reunion by Terrance Dicks and Barry Letts
- Island of Death by Barry Letts

=== Eighth Doctor Adventures ===
- The Eight Doctors by Terrance Dicks
- Alien Bodies by Lawrence Miles (appears in the prologue)
- Interference: Books One and Two by Lawrence Miles (History altered to cause him to regenerate ahead of schedule)
- The Ancestor Cell by Peter Anghelides and Stephen Cole (Appears as a 'ghost' within the TARDIS due to his altered regeneration)
- Seen in the TARDIS mirror in Camera Obscura

=== Telos Doctor Who novellas ===
- Nightdreamers by Tom Arden

=== Penguin Fiftieth Anniversary eBook novellas ===
- The Spear of Destiny by Marcus Sedgwick

== Comics ==
=== TV Comic ===
- The Arkwood Experiments
- The Multi-Mobile
- Insect
- The Metal Eaters
- The Fishmen of Carpantha
- Doctor Who and the Rocks from Venus
- Doctor Who and the Robot
- Trial by Fire
- The Kingdom Builders
- Children of the Evil Eye (1 Sep 1973)
- Nova (13 Oct 1973)
- The Amateur (15 Dec 1973)
- The Disintegrator (2 Feb 1974)
- Is Anyone There? (9 Mar 1974)
- Size Control (18 May 1974)
- The Magician (6 Jul 1974)
- The Metal Eaters (24 Aug 1974)
- Lords of the Ether (12 Oct 1974)
- The Wanderers (7 Dec 1974)

=== TV Comic Specials ===
- Assassin From Space
- Undercover

=== TV Comic Annuals ===
- Castaway
- Levitation
- Petrified

=== TV Action ===
- Gemini Plan
- Timebenders
- The Vogan Slaves
- The Celluloid Midas
- Backtime
- The Eternal Present
- Subzero
- The Planet of the Daleks
- A Stitch in Time
- The Enemy From Nowhere
- The Ugrakks
- Steelfist
- Zeron Invasion
- Deadly Choice
- Who is the Stranger
- The Glen of Sleeping
- The Threat From Beneath
- kcaB to the Sun
- The Labyrinth
- The Spoilers
- The Vortex
- The Unheard Voice

=== TV Action Specials ===
- Fogbound
- Secret of the Tower
- Doomcloud
- Perils of Paris
- Who's Who?

=== TV Action Annuals ===
- The Plant Master
- Ride to Nowhere
- The Hungry Planet

=== Doctor Who Magazine ===
- Change of Mind
- The Man in the Ion Mask
- Target Practice

=== IDW series ===
- The Forgotten
- Prisoners of Time
