= List of non-televised First Doctor stories =

In addition to the televised episodes of Doctor Who starring William Hartnell, the First Doctor has appeared in a number of spin-off media.

== Audio dramas ==
- TV Century 21 records created a 1966 album, featuring the cast, and retelling of the final serial The Chase (Doctor Who) simply called: The Daleks (1966)
- Frostfire (an adventure related by the character Vicki) (2007)
- Mother Russia (an adventure related by the character Steven) (2007)
- Here There Be Monsters (an adventure related by the character Susan) (2008)
- Home Truths (an adventure related by the character Sara Kingdom) (2008)
- The Transit of Venus (an adventure related by the character Ian) (2009)
- The Drowned World (an adventure related by the character Sara Kingdom) (2009)
- The Suffering (an adventure related by the characters Steven & Vicki) (2010)
- The Guardian of the Solar System (an adventure related by the character Sara Kingdom) (2010)
- Farewell Great Macedon & Fragile Yellow Arc of Fragrance (adventures related by the characters Susan & Ian) (2010)
- Quinnis (an adventure related by the character Susan) (2010)
- The Perpetual Bond (an adventure related by the characters Steven & Oliver) (2011)
- The Cold Equations (an adventure related by the characters Steven & Oliver) (2011)
- Tales from the Vault (a short adventure related by the character Steven) (2011)
- The Rocket Men (an adventure related by the character Ian) (2011, The Companion Chronicles)
- The First Wave (an adventure related by the characters Steven & Oliver) (2011)
- The Anachronauts (an adventure related by the characters Steven & Sara) (2012)
- The Wanderer (an adventure related by the character Ian) (2012)
- The Revenants (an adventure related by the character Ian) (2012, The Companion Chronicles)
- The Time Museum (an adventure related by the character Ian) (2012)
- The Masters of Luxor (adventure related by the characters Susan & Ian) (2012)
- Return of the Rocket Men (an adventure related by the character Steven) (2012)
- Destiny of the Doctor: Hunters of Earth (an adventure related by the character Susan) (2013)
- The Flames of Cadiz (an adventure related by the character Ian) (2013, The Companion Chronicles)
- The Library of Alexandria (an adventure related by the characters Susan & Ian) (2013)
- The Alchemists (an adventure related by the character Susan) (2013, The Companion Chronicles)
- The Dark Planet (an adventure related by the characters Ian and Vicki) (2013)
- Upstairs (an adventure related by the characters Steven and Vicki) (2013)
- The Light at the End (portrayed by William Russell) (2013)
- The Beginning (an adventure related by the character Susan) (2013)
- The Sleeping City (an adventure related by the character Ian) (2014)
- Starborn (an adventure related by the character Vicki) (2014)
- The War to End All Wars (an adventure related by the character Steven) (2014)
- Domain of the Voord (an adventure related by the characters Susan and Ian) (2014)
- The Doctor's Tale (an adventure related by the characters Ian and Vicki) (2014)
- The Bounty of Ceres (an adventure related by the characters Vicki and Steven) (2014)
- An Ordinary Life (an adventure related by the characters Steven and Sara Kingdom) (2014)
- The First Doctor Volume 1 (Adventures related by the characters Susan, Vicki & Steven) (2015)
  - The Sleeping Blood
  - The Unwinding World
  - The Founding Fathers
  - The Locked Room
- The Age of Endurance (an adventure related by the characters Susan, Ian and Barbara) (2016)
- The Fifth Traveller (an adventure related by the characters Ian, Barbara, Vicki and Jospa) (2016)
- The Ravelli Conspiracy (an adventure related by the characters Vicki and Steven) (2016)
- The Sontarans (an adventure related by the characters Steven and Sara Kingdom) (2016)
- The First Doctor Volume 2 (Adventures related by the character Vicki, Steven, and Polly) (2017)
  - Fields of Terror
  - Across the Darkened City
  - The Bonfires of the Vanities
  - The Plague of Dreams

== Short Trips audios ==
- Rise and Fall
- 1963
- Seven to One
- A Star is Born
- The Flywheel Revolution
- Etheria
- The Sporting Part
- The Falling
- O Tannenbaum

=== Unbound alternative First Doctors ===
- Geoffrey Bayldon
  - Auld Mortality
  - A Storm of Angels
- Derek Jacobi
  - Deadline

== Novels and short stories ==
=== Virgin New Adventures ===
- All-Consuming Fire by Andy Lane (cameo appearance)

=== Virgin Missing Adventures ===
- Venusian Lullaby by Paul Leonard
- The Sorcerer's Apprentice by Christopher Bulis
- The Empire of Glass by Andy Lane
- The Man in the Velvet Mask by Daniel O'Mahony
- The Plotters by Gareth Roberts

=== Past Doctor Adventures ===
- The Witch Hunters by Steve Lyons
- Salvation by Steve Lyons
- City at World's End by Christopher Bulis
- Bunker Soldiers by Martin Day
- Byzantium! by Keith Topping
- Ten Little Aliens by Stephen Cole
- The Eleventh Tiger by David A. McIntee
- The Time Travellers by Simon Guerrier

=== Eighth Doctor Adventures ===
- The Eight Doctors by Terrance Dicks
- Seen in the TARDIS mirror in Camera Obscura

=== BBC Short Trips ===
==== Short Trips ====
- The Last Days
- There are Fairies at the Bottom of the Garden

==== More Short Trips ====
- 64 Carlysle Street
- Romans Cutaway

==== Short Trips and Sidesteps ====
- The Longest Story in the World
- Nothing at the End of the Lane (3 Parts)
- Planet of the Bunnoids

=== Big Finish Short Trips ===
==== Short Trips: Zodiac ====
- The True and Indisputable Facts in the Case of the Ram’s Skull
- Five Card Draw

==== Short Trips: Companions ====
- The Little Drummer Boy
- A Long Night

==== Short Trips: A Universe of Terrors ====
- The Exiles
- Mire and Clay by Gareth Wigmore
- Ash

==== Short Trips: Steel Skies ====
- Corridors of Power

==== Short Trips: Past Tense ====
- The Thief of Sherwood
- Bide-a-Wee

==== Short Trips: Life Science ====
- Scribbles in Chalk by Gareth Wigmore

==== Short Trips: Repercussions ====
- The Rag and Bone Man's Story
- The Schoolboy's Story
- The Juror's Story

==== Short Trips: Monsters ====
- From Eternity
- Categorical Imperative

==== Short Trips: A Christmas Treasury ====
- Every Day

==== Short Trips: Seven Deadly Sins ====
- The Duke’s Folly by Gareth Wigmore

==== Short Trips: A Day in the Life ====
- Waiting for Jeremy
- Making History

==== Short Trips: The Solar System ====
- Mars

==== Short Trips: The History of Christmas ====
- Set in Stone
- The Gift

==== Short Trips: Farewells ====
- The Mother Road by Gareth Wigmore
- The Three Paths

==== Short Trips: The Centenarian ====
- Childhood Living

==== Short Trips: Time Signature ====
- The Ruins of Time

==== Short Trips: Destination Prague ====
- Room for Improvement
- Life From Lifelessness
- The Long Step Backward

==== Short Trips: Snapshots ====
- Indian Summer

==== Short Trips: 2040 ====
- /Carpenter/Butterfly/Baronet by Gareth Wigmore

==== Short Trips: Christmas Around the World ====
- Mirth, or Walking Spirits by Gareth Wigmore

==== Short Trips: Indefinable Magic ====
- The Reign Makers by Gareth Wigmore

=== Telos Doctor Who novellas ===
- Time and Relative by Kim Newman
- Frayed by Tara Samms

=== Penguin Fiftieth Anniversary eBook novellas ===
- A Big Hand for the Doctor by Eoin Colfer

=== Miscellaneous novellas ===
- Doctor Who and the Invasion from Space
- In Chris Roberson's short story "Annus Mirabilis" from the second volume of Tales of the Shadowmen, it is strongly indicated that the French science fiction character Doctor Omega is the First Doctor, with him assuming the name Omega as a reference to Omega the Time Lord.

== Comics ==
=== TV Comic ===
- The Klepton Parasites
- The Therovian Quest
- The Hijackers of Thrax
- On the Web Planet
- The Gyros Injustice
- Challenge of the Piper
- Moon Landing
- Time in Reverse
- Lizardworld
- The Ordeals of Demeter
- Enter: The Go-Ray
- Shark Bait
- A Christmas Story
- The Didus Expedition
- Space Station Z-7
- Plague of the Black Scorpi
- The Trodos Tyranny
- The Secret of Gemino
- The Haunted Planet
- The Hunters of Zerox
- The Underwater Robot
- Return of the Trods
- The Galaxy Games
- The Experimenters

=== TV Comic Specials ===
- Prisoners of Gritog
- Guests of King Neptune
- The Gaze of the Gorgon

=== Doctor Who Magazine ===
- Food For Thought
- Operation Proteus

=== Doctor Who Magazine Specials ===
- A Religious Experience
- Are You Listening?

=== IDW series ===
- The Forgotten
- Prisoners of Time

== Other Adventures ==
- The Masters of Luxor by Anthony Coburn
- Campaign by Jim Mortimore
- Destiny of the Doctors
