= The Tenth Planet =

029 – The Tenth Planet
- Doctor Who serial
- The Doctor and Polly confront a Cyberman. Critics praised William Hartnell in his final regular appearance as the Doctor and the introduction of the iconic Cybermen.

Cast
- Doctor: William Hartnell – First Doctor
- Companions: Anneke Wills – Polly; Michael Craze – Ben Jackson
- Others: Robert Beatty – General Cutler; Dudley Jones – Dyson; David Dodimead – Barclay; Alan White – Schultz; Earl Cameron – Williams; Shane Shelton – Tito; John Brandon – American Sergeant; Steve Plytas – Wigner; Christopher Matthews – Radar Technician; Reg Whitehead – Krail / Jarl; Harry Brooks – Talon / Krang; Gregg Palmer – Shav / Gern; Ellen Cullen – Geneva Technician; Glenn Beck – TV Announcer; Roy Skelton – Cybermen Voice; Christopher Dunham – R/T Technician; Callen Angelo – Terry Cutler; Peter Hawkins – Cybermen Voice; Patrick Troughton – Second Doctor (uncredited)

Production
- Directed by: Derek Martinus
- Written by: Kit Pedler; Gerry Davis (3–4)
- Script editor: Gerry Davis
- Produced by: Innes Lloyd
- Music by: None (Note: The serial uses stock music composed by Angela Morley, Robert Farnon, John Denis, and Martin Slavin.)
- Production code: DD
- Series: Season 4
- Running time: 4 episodes, 25 minutes each
- Episode(s) missing: 1 episode (4)
- First broadcast: 8 October 1966
- Last broadcast: 29 October 1966

Chronology
← Preceded by The Smugglers	Followed by → The Power of the Daleks

The Tenth Planet is the second serial of the fourth season of the British science fiction television series Doctor Who. Written by Kit Pedler and Gerry Davis and directed by Derek Martinus, it was broadcast on BBC1 in four weekly parts from 8 to 29 October 1966. In the serial, the Doctor (William Hartnell) and his travelling companions, Polly (Anneke Wills) and Ben Jackson (Michael Craze), arrive at a space tracking station on the South Pole in 1986, where they encounter the Cybermen, whose planet, Mondas, is absorbing energy from Earth and will soon destroy it.

The serial marked Hartnell's final regular appearance as the Doctor; at the end of the fourth episode, the character "regenerates" (Note: The process of regeneration was referred to as "renewal" in the following serial The Power of the Daleks (1966); the term "regeneration" was first used in Planet of the Spiders (1974).) into a younger man, portrayed by Patrick Troughton. The Tenth Planet was also the first appearance of the Cybermen, a race of malevolent cyborgs conceived by Pedler due to his fear of humans replacing their organs and limbs mechanically through "spare-part surgery"; a reflection of their era, they subsequently became one of the programme's most iconic recurring villains. The serial was the first in Doctor Who's fourth production block, with early filming at Ealing Studios from August 1966 and primary recording at Riverside Studios from September to October.

The Tenth Planet received an average of 6.75 million viewers across the four episodes, halting the programme's declining viewership. Reviewers enjoyed the direction, performances, and the introduction of the Cybermen, though some found the story confusing and nonsensical. The fourth episode was wiped by the BBC and remains missing; the only extant material includes the regeneration scene, though an animated reconstruction was released in 2013. The story was novelised by Davis, and the serial was released on VHS, DVD, and as an audiobook, while sounds and music have been released on CD. The introduction of regeneration has been credited with establishing Doctor Who's ongoing longevity.

== Plot ==
The TARDIS lands at the South Pole in 1986. The Doctor and his travelling companions, Ben and Polly, are taken to the Snowcap Base space tracking station. Commanded by General Cutler, the base is monitoring a crewed space probe being drawn off-course by an unknown force, and they discover a new, unknown planet approaching Earth. Recognising identical landmasses to those of Earth, the Doctor reveals it is Mondas, the Earth's long-lost twin planet.

A mysterious spaceship lands in the snow and three robotic creatures take control of Snowcap Base. They are Cybermen, former human beings who have replaced their bodies with mechanical parts, and no longer have the "weakness" of emotions. The base staff watch helplessly as the space probe is destroyed by the gravitational pull of Mondas. The Cybermen explain that Mondas is absorbing energy from Earth and will soon destroy it. They propose to take humans back to Mondas and turn them into Cybermen.

The humans mount a resistance and kill the Cybermen with their own cyberweapons. Cutler plans to destroy Mondas using a Z-bomb nuclear missile; he is opposed by his chief scientist, Dr. Barclay, and Space Command HQ in Geneva, as the radiation from the exploding planet would cause immense loss of life on Earth. The Doctor, unwell, passes out. Cutler detains the Doctor and Ben in a cabin. Ben escapes, sabotages the rocket, and the Z-bomb launch fails.

A new squadron of Cybermen arrive, kill Cutler, take control of the base, and order the Z-bomb to be disarmed. Cybermen invade Earth and take over Geneva Space Command. The Doctor realises that Mondas is absorbing too much energy and will be destroyed, and that the Cybermen plan to destroy the Earth with the international arsenal of Z-bombs to save Mondas. The Doctor and Polly are imprisoned on the Cybermen's spaceship. Ben and the base crewmembers overpower the Cybermen and regain control of the base. As more Cybermen enter the base, Mondas explodes. Disconnected from their power source on Mondas, all the invading Cybermen on Earth collapse and die, ending the invasion.

Ben frees the Doctor and Polly. The Doctor, ill, returns to the TARDIS. Ben and Polly follow, and find the Doctor has collapsed unconscious on the floor. As the sound of the TARDIS engines is heard, the Doctor is covered in a luminous light and transforms into a younger man.

== Production ==
=== Conception and writing ===
Kit Pedler (an academic at the University of London) was invited to submit story ideas for Doctor Who following his advisory role on the serial The War Machines (1966). He was inspired by two scientific elements: a space capsule suddenly losing energy, topical to the ongoing Space Race; and "star monks" coming from Earth's "twin planet" (Note: Story editor Gerry Davis recalled suggesting an idea about a "twin planet" as a launching point for new stories years earlier, and Malcolm Hulke had proposed the idea with the unmade story The Hidden Planet in 1963.) on a religious quest. Davis found the latter too similar to the Monk from The Time Meddler (1965) and suggested Pedler focus on his fears as a scientist instead of science-fiction concepts. Pedler's primary concern was the idea of machines replacing human organs and limbs; he discussed the idea of "spare part" surgery with his wife, and was intrigued by the concept of a cybernetic man—"Cybermen"—and whether they would maintain their souls. His initial concepts included their arms being placed lower on their body than humans. The programme's script editor, Gerry Davis, formally commissioned Pedler's serial, Doctor Who and the Tenth Planet, (Note: The title of The Tenth Planet was conceived by Kit Pedler's wife, who was also a doctor.) on 17 May, with scripts due by 6 June.

Pedler delivered the first three draft scripts on 18 and 25 May and 3 June, and the fourth in early June, before being admitted to hospital with ulcerative colitis. Davis completed rewrites on the scripts for the third and fourth episodes, for which he was given staff contribution clearance on 29 June; he was paid half of the scripting fee and copyright on the concept of the Cybermen, to which Pedler agreed on 13 July. Davis worked on the scripts on the evenings and weekends, as he was busy working on both the preceding story, The Smugglers, and the following one, The Power of the Daleks. Pedler and Davis's names were misspelled as "Kitt Pedler" and "Gerry Davies" in the first and third episodes, respectively. Davis and producer Innes Lloyd felt The Tenth Planet was their first original story for the programme, having adopted the preceding serials from their predecessors; they were happy with the serial and considered it a blueprint for later stories. It was Doctor Who's first story set in the near future, (Note: The script had originally defined the year as 2000, not 1986 as in the final serial.) and its first "base-under-siege" story. Davis and Pedler hoped the Cybermen would become as successful as the Daleks; their voices were scripted as "flat but not Dalekish, hard in tone". Anneke Wills and Michael Craze (who portrayed Polly and Ben, respectively) were excited to have a story written by a scientist.

Derek Martinus was assigned as the serial's director, following his work on the third-season serial Galaxy 4 (1965). Sonia Markham, who had supervised makeup for Doctor Who since the first-season serial The Reign of Terror (1964), was replaced by Gillian James on The Tenth Planet. The Tenth Planet was Peter Kindred's first work as a designer on the programme, and he had about three weeks to prepare before filming. He and Martinus approached the serial as scientific and realistic instead of science fiction. Pedler's scripts indicated that the Polar Base's tracking room should be based on Cape Kennedy and the space capsules resemble the Gemini capsules, and the polar setting was inspired by one of his favourite films, The Thing from Another World (1951). Brian Hodgson created twelve sounds for the serial, including the Cybermen guns and the malfunctioning TARDIS, while stock music was used in place of an incidental score. An animated graphics sequence for the opening and closing credits was designed by Bernard Lodge on 16 mm film.

Costume designer Daphne Dare was replaced by Sandra Reid, who discussed cybernetics with Pedler and Martinus before crafting the Cybermen with Kindred. A silk jersey was used for the face masks, while a full-length wool jersey bodystocking was used for the "skin", with a transparent polythene suit atop it. The costumes were heavy, held together with nuts and bolts holding together plastic piping and metal epaulettes. The metallic headpieces were created by Shawcraft Models, adapted from a truck headlamp; the bulb exploded in the first test shot, abandoning the idea of illuminating the halogen lamp. The actors wore Wellington boots, and James added silver-blue makeup to their hands as Reid forgot to make gloves, for which she was regretful; Wills felt the makeup gave the Cybermen a suitably human quality. Seven Cyberman costumes were made, of which three were fully practical. The Doctor's costume matched his outfit in his first serial: scarf, cloak, and Astrakhan hat.

=== Casting and characters ===
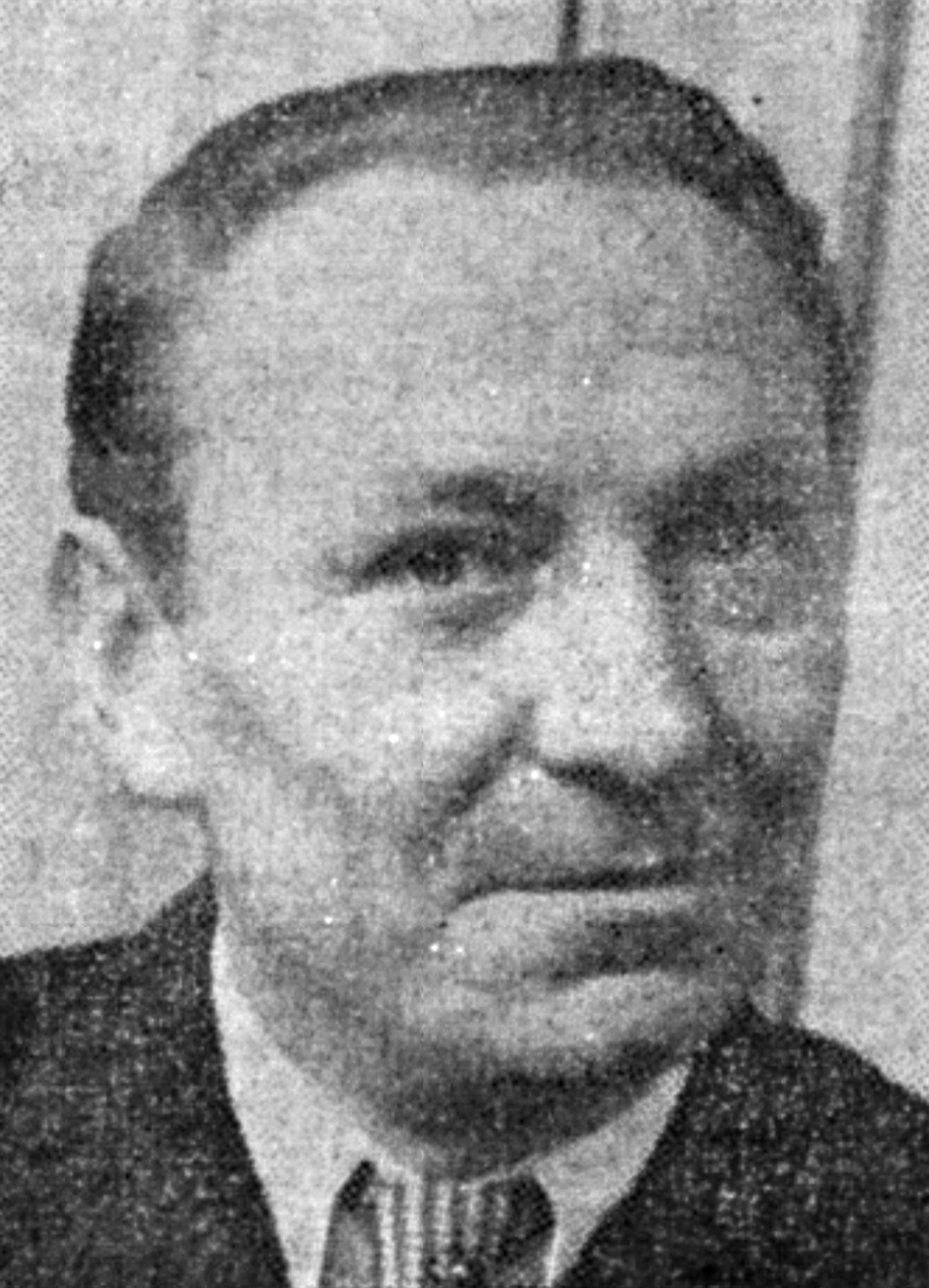
The Tenth Planet marked William Hartnell's final regular appearance as the Doctor.

Lead actor William Hartnell had felt unsettled on Doctor Who since the original cast and production team had departed in 1965. He found the programme had become increasingly "evil" and suggested more whimsical stories for its young audience, while the newer producers had found him difficult to work with; former producers had considered replacing him during The Celestial Toymaker (1966) before his contract was renewed. Lloyd, whom Hartnell respected, suggested that the actor depart the role and be replaced; Shaun Sutton, the head of drama at BBC Television, felt a new lead actor may reverse the programme's decreasing viewership. Davis considered that the Doctor could die and be reborn, and Lloyd suggested the character could occasionally rejuvenate himself into a younger man. This idea was incorporated into The Tenth Planet, for which Hartnell was contracted in mid-June 1966, following the expiration of his regular contract at the end of The Smugglers. For the transformation sequence, Davis had been inspired by The Strange Case of Dr Jekyll and Mr Hyde (1886).

Hartnell's departure was formally announced on 5 August; Hartnell said he felt "three years in one part is a good innings and it is time for a change". Several actors were considered for Hartnell's replacement, including Michael Hordern, Ron Moody, Tommy Steele, and Patrick Wymark. It was ultimately offered to Patrick Troughton (Note: Troughton had previously been considered by director Rex Tucker to portray Johnny Ringo in The Gunfighters (1966).) in late June, and he was contracted for 22 episodes on 2 August and for The Tenth Planet on 16 September. (Note: The production team had assumed that Troughton would not be required for The Tenth Planet as they figured a transition shot was impossible, instead envisaging that The Tenth Planet would end with Hartnell collapsing, followed by Troughton's introduction in The Power of the Daleks; this was changed when the visual effect was deemed achievable.) Hartnell approved of his casting, according to Lloyd, and Wills recalled Hartnell was honoured to be replaced by an actor of Troughton's calibre. Troughton's role was formally announced on 1 September. Before recording the fourth episode, the production team realised Troughton had not been assigned a dressing room; he was given the one assigned to guest star Callen Angelo, who instead was moved to share with Steve Plytas.

Martinus began casting guest roles in August 1966, opting for some non-British actors to reflect the multinational organisation. Robert Beatty, whom Martinus had directed in a production of The Man Who Played God (1961), was cast on 3 August as General Cutler, described by Martinus as similar to General MacArthur. Hartnell had guest-starred alongside Beatty on Dial 999 (1958–1959) and they enjoyed working together again. Australian actor Alan White portrayed Schultz (originally written as a German), while Bermudan actor Earl Cameron (Note: Cameron's agent, Terry Carney, was Hartnell's son-in-law; Cameron suspected he may have introduced Carney and Hartnell's daughter to each other.) was cast as Glyn Williams (written as a Welshman), reportedly becoming the first black actor to portray an astronaut on screen and the second black actor in a speaking role on Doctor Who (after Elroy Josephs in The Smugglers). Wills recalled Hartnell's prejudice was exposed when working with Cameron, which ashamed her and Craze; Cameron said he was not aware of it, calling it "his problem, not mine". Beatty and Cameron were billed as the serial's top guest stars.

Martinus had approached Bernard Hepton about portraying Dyson, but withdrew on 19 August after the character's role was significantly diminished in rewrites; the role was given to Dudley Jones. Roy Skelton voiced the Cybermen, having previously voiced the Monoids in The Ark (1966); Martinus had worked with Skelton on stage years earlier and recently directed him in Quick Before They Catch Us (1966). Skelton decided the voice would consistently change pitch to sound computer generated. Peter Hawkins, who had voiced the Daleks, joined Skelton for the fourth episode, and struggled to mimic his approach due to limited rehearsals. They performed the voices in the studio during filming, while the Cyberman actors opened their mouths simultaneously, giving the impression that the voices were not naturally produced like a human's. The principal Cybermen were portrayed by Reg Whitehead, Harry Brooks, and Gregg Palmer; the creatures were named in the scripts and credits, but not in dialogue. Whitehead and Martinus had appeared together in a production of Lady Windermere's Fan before the latter had become a director.

=== Filming ===
The Tenth Planet was the first serial recorded in Doctor Who's fourth production block. Early 35 mm filming took place on Stages 3A and 3B of Ealing Studios from 30 August 1966. The first day consisted of model filming, including Mondas, the Cyberman spaceship, and the Z-bomb missile. Cast members, including Wills and Craze, were required the following day for shots of the TARDIS on the polar landscape; Gordon Craig doubled for Hartnell, who was not contracted to appear and still on holiday. The polar landscape was constructed at Ealing instead of Riverside Studios due its size and the ease of controlling the wind machine in the larger space. Kindred organised a painted backdrop of mountains and rocks to establish distance and depth. Craze encountered difficulties with the fake snow material entering his nose, which he had injured in a recent role; the snow was thrown by production assistant Edwina Verner, whom he soon started dating and subsequently married. An armourer was present on set to supervise the use of Browning 9mm guns, and a studio fireman was requested to supervise the smoke effects. The last two days of filming at Ealing—1 and 2 September—focused on the Cybermen; the first day proved difficult as some of the actors fainted under the heat of the costumes and studio lighting.

Weekly four-day rehearsals for the serial began on 12 September, and recording took place in Studio 1 of Riverside Studios every Saturday from 17 September; this was a change from the usual schedule of recording on Fridays, now allowing for film work to take place on Mondays. (Note: Lloyd found the change difficult to understand, and named it among his "list of headaches" in a letter to BBC's head of drama, Shaun Sutton, in October 1966.) Hartnell was concerned and irritable on set, requesting that the ping-pong table be forbidden to avoid disrupting his concentration. Stock footage was used in several episodes: a Blue Streak rocket launch was used for Zeus 4's launch in the first episode, radars and radio telescopes of Jodrell Bank Observatory in the second; and rocket jet fire in the third. Hartnell became ill with bronchitis after recording the second episode and was advised to avoid work for a week; the third episode's script originally had the Doctor become weaker, though Davis reworked it to account for Hartnell's absence: Polly and Ben inherited much of his dialogue, while Barclay relayed most of the scientific information. Craig doubled for Hartnell again, facing away from the camera while wearing his costume and wig. The tracking room set was built to appear large and dynamic, with several small details representing different characters; between recordings, it was stored at Alexandra Palace, and the transportation had resulted in damage by the third episode, which angered Martinus. Some of the set's equipment was hired from Pinewood Studios.

The Tenth Planet introduced the concept of regeneration, achieved by crossfading between two cameras. It is recognised as a landmark moment in Doctor Who's history that established its longevity.

The fourth episode was recorded on 8 October, several hours after the first was broadcast. The final shot was recorded first; Troughton, noticing that Hartnell was upset and encountering difficulties, treated him sensitively. Vision mixer Shirley Coward created the flaring effect, crossfading between two cameras; she discovered that the actors' cheekbones matched, resulting in a cleaner transition. The shot was achieved in two takes, after extensive preparation. It took longer than anticipated, and recording of the episode subsequently overran by 30 minutes. In the original script, the Doctor had several final lines (Note: The Doctor's final lines in the original script were: "No, no, I can't go through with it—I can't. I can't. I will not give in.") which were not performed in the final episode. The first episode was budgeted at £3,212 but cost more, while the rest were budgeted at £2,585 each but cost less; recording cost a total of £11,814 (Note: The four episodes cost £4,835, £2,355, £2,171, and £2,453, respectively.) (equivalent to £170,482 in 2025). After recording, a leaving party for Hartnell was held at Lloyd's flat, after which Lloyd drove him home; Lloyd recalled telling Hartnell that he "now can have a rest", to which Hartnell replied, "Yes, I'll be very pleased."

== Reception ==
=== Broadcast and ratings ===
Episode	Title	Run time	Original release date	UK viewers (millions)	Appreciation Index
1	"Episode 1"	23:08	8 October 1966	5.5	50
2	"Episode 2"	23:15	15 October 1966	6.4	48
3	"Episode 3"	23:31	22 October 1966	7.6	48
4	"Episode 4"^{†}	24:02	29 October 1966	7.5	47

^† Episode is missing

The Tenth Planet was broadcast on BBC1 in four weekly parts from 8 to 29 October 1966. The serial halted the programme's declining viewership, with viewing figures increasing over its predecessor, returning to the top 50 by the second episode; they increased from 5.5 million from the first to 7.6 million by the third, averaging 6.75 million viewers overall. The serial saw limited overseas sale: it was broadcast in Australia in June 1967 and May 1968, in New Zealand around August 1969, and in Singapore in April 1972. The BBC Television Archives had intended to keep the 16 mm film recordings, while the 405-line videotape of the fourth episode was cleared for wiping on 31 January and 20 October 1969, and subsequently erased. The episode was provided to Blue Peter for its tenth-anniversary celebration of Doctor Who in November 1973, during which the regeneration scene was shown. The episode subsequently went missing; an ongoing myth suggested this occurred under Blue Peter's ownership, though this is unfounded.

The only remaining footage of the fourth episode is roughly 30 seconds of brief scenes from the end, including the regeneration; the only other visual records are the telesnaps taken by John Cura. The fourth episode has subsequently been named among the most sought-after episodes of Doctor Who and British television, particularly due to the regeneration scene. BBC Enterprises continued offering the series for overseas sale until at least 1974. The second episode was shown as part of Doctor Who: The Developing Art at the National Film Theatre on 29 October 1983 and other events in 1984, and the third episode was broadcast for the programme's thirtieth-anniversary celebrations on UK Gold on 20 November 1993. In 1992, a man under the name "Roger K. Barrett" claimed to possess a videotape recording of the fourth episode, though it was revealed as a hoax when the tape was blank; Craze recorded a special introduction for a potential release of the episode, though it was abandoned.

=== Critical response ===
After the first episode, Morning Star's Ann Lawrence found the concept of a space station run by "a bunch of moronic, trigger-happy Americans" concerning and hoped subsequent episodes would improve as "it could hardly get worse". Hugh Greene, the director-general of the BBC, enjoyed the second episode due to the Cybermen, according to director of television Kenneth Adam. The Appreciation Index saw a slight improvement over recent serials, dropping from 50 to 47 over four weeks. Doctor Who Magazine (DWM) readers generally ranked The Tenth Planet among the top quarter of the First Doctor's serials (Note: Of the First Doctor's 29 stories, The Tenth Planet was ranked 2nd in 1998, 4th in 2009, 8th in 2014, and 6th in 2023.) and the top half of the programme's stories overall. (Note: The Tenth Planet was voted 26th of 159 total stories in 1998, 55th of 200 in 2009, and 85th of 241 in 2014.) In The Discontinuity Guide, Paul Cornell, Martin Day, and Keith Topping called it "a reasonable tale, made memorable by the Cybermen and the Doctor's regeneration". DVD Talk's John Sinnott similarly considered it important and named it "an all around excellent story". Mark Campbell found the serial "gripping" despite some "poor modelwork" and called the Cybermen "chilling", and Emily Kausalik enjoyed the use of stock music, particularly upon the introduction of the Cybermen.

Mark Clapham, Eddie Robson, and Jim Smith wrote that Martinus "directs with panache" and includes "some memorable iconography". DWM's Matthew Sweet lauded the Cybermen's design and voices, and Martinus's decision to record their first appearance on film, allowing him to cut between close-ups of the men and wide shots of the Cybermen. David J. Howe and Stephen James Walker felt the Cybermen dominated the story despite their limited appearance. DWM's Vanessa Bishop considered their design superior to all that followed, and Starburst's Paul Mount found The Tenth Planet the best depiction of their true horror. io9's Alasdair Wilkins wrote that later stories made them more intimidating but never creepier. The A.V. Club's Christopher Bahn thought the simplistic design made them appear more human and therefore more terrifying. Conversely, Radio Times's Patrick Mulkern called them "like usherettes from some kinky, futuristic moviehouse".

DWM's Bishop praised Hartnell's "commanding and enigmatic last performance". Clapham, Robson, and Smith lauded his final scenes, including the "moving and strangely unexpected" regeneration, and Toby Hadoke enjoyed the nuance in his final lines "in spite of the script". DVD Talk's Sinnott described Hartnell as "in top form", especially in the first episode, and Starburst's Mount found him "generally on better form" than recent stories. SFX's Ian Berriman felt Hartnell was upstaged by the guest cast in the first two episodes, especially Beatty, and Howe and Walker enjoyed Beatty's performance as "a man who can galvanise all the others on the base". Robert Shearman felt Cameron and White's performances made "for some of the tensest scenes seen in the Hartnell era". Cornell, Day, and Topping felt Hartnell "doesn't really get the finale that he deserved" due to the Doctor's absence, and Graham Sleight noted it "hardly seems a fitting send-off", citing the irrelevance of the regeneration until the final scenes. Valerie Estelle Frankel appreciated Polly's insistent speech about the value of human life and emotion, though noted "she's stuck making the coffee".

The A.V. Club's Bahn felt that The Tenth Planet effectively concluded the First Doctor's arc, "completing his turn from heel to hero", and io9's Wilkins called the plot "about as gripping and tense as early Doctor Who could be". DWM's Sweet found it was "curiously unburdened by proper science", citing Mondas's "fantastical" nature, and Starburst's J.R. Southall considered it a turning point for the programme, embracing entertainment over education. SFX's Berriman noted the "scripts feature so much nonsense" and lack explanation, and DWM's Bishop described it as "a wobbly plot which doesn't even come close to being thought through", featuring "every submarine-movie cliché", and found the existence and destruction of Mondas confusing and nonsensical. Clapham, Robson, and Smith called the serial "unimaginative, passionless and really quite dumb" and found its treatment of Hartnell "utterly unforgivable". Cornell, Day, and Topping felt the story "tries hard to be radical in its presentation of 'the future'", citing the black characters, but noted the lack of women on the polar base.

== Themes and analysis ==
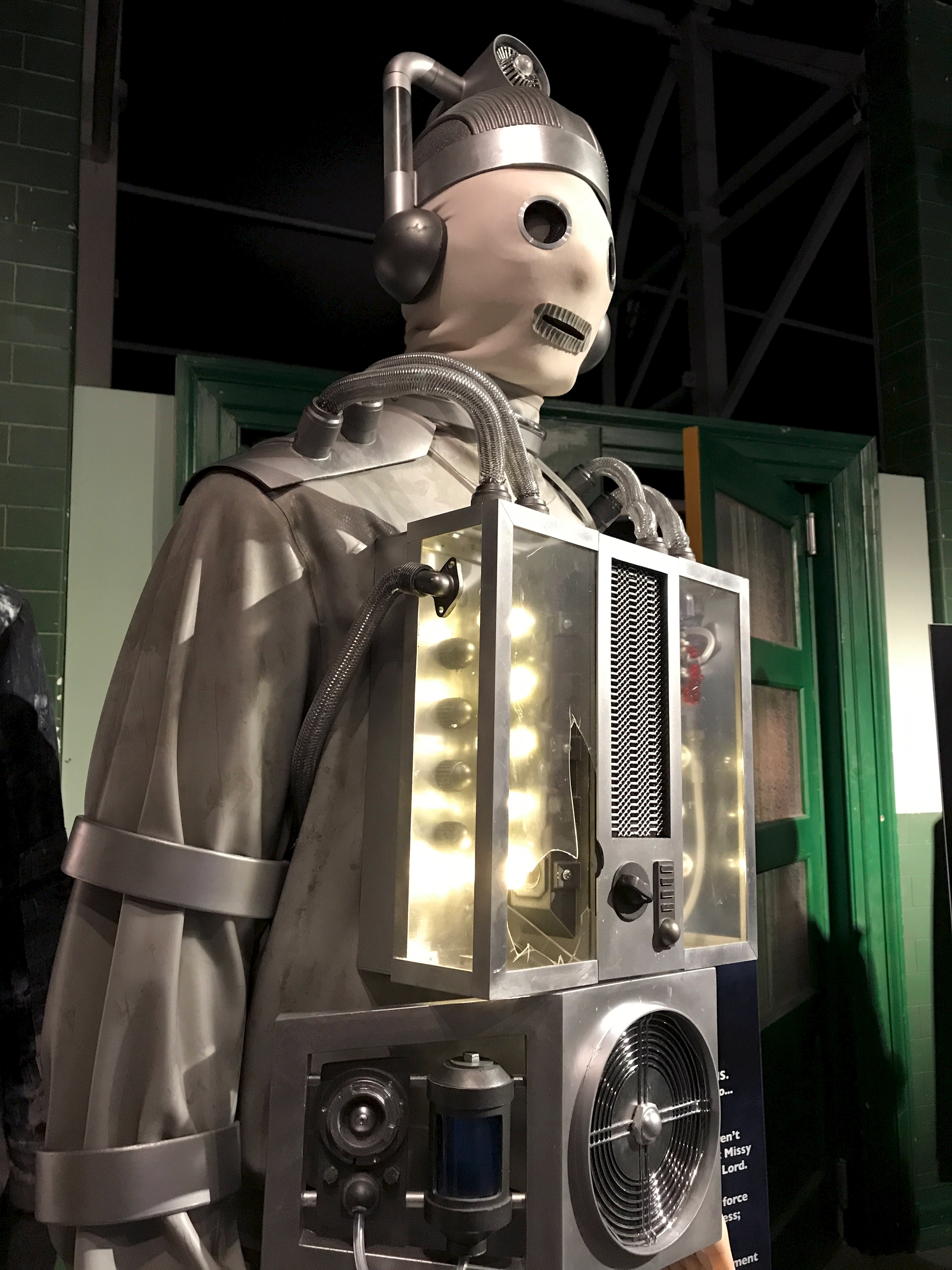
Several writers found the Cybermen a reflection of their era, conceived as the ultimate depiction of humans replacing their body parts with mechanical parts: soulless creatures impervious to damage.

Pedler conceived the Cybermen as the ultimate depiction of humans replacing their body parts with mechanical parts: soulless and emotionless creatures impervious to damage. Kevin S. Decker suggested the Cybermen were deliberately created to serve as Others in opposition to the human race, achieved by Pedler's focus on the theme of "dehumanising medicine". Lincoln Geraghty noted a cultural fear of the "monstrous, hybrid 'other'", and J. S. Mackley felt this othering was emphasised by the Cybermen's masks, dehumanising the creatures and "concealing the 'other within'". Sweet considered the Cybermen "faintly aristocratic" in contrast to the Daleks as "worker drones". Mackley found the exaggerated characteristics of the Cybermen's masks reminiscent of The Black and White Minstrel Show and suggested they were based on a xenophobic fear of foreigners entering Britain to steal resources, as the Cybermen intend to do with the Earth. Some writers identified the serial as an example of Doctor Who presenting the future as multi-ethnic and internationalist.

Several writers found the Cybermen a reflection of their era, particularly highlighting similarities with the 1960s "man amplifier" exoskeletons created by the Cornell Aeronautical Laboratory, commissioned by the United States Department of Defense. Sleight noted that, while earlier stories like No Woman Born (1944) had explored the concept of mechanical parts replacing human bodies and emotions, The Tenth Planet was especially topical, produced at a time when modern medicine was pioneering transplant surgery. James Chapman identified similar predecessors in stories like Frankenstein (1818), Metropolis (1927), and The Day the Earth Stood Still (1951), though recognised real science as the primary inspiration. Rhonda Knight suspected that Pedler's concerns were simultaneously about body augmentation in medicine (especially body enhancement experiments for civilian and military uses) as well as the dehumanisation of society—an example of posthumanism. Inti Yanes-Fernandez felt they represented the broader ongoing fusion of human existence and technology, and Sweet noted cybernetics refers to "the science of controlling and managing systems", at the time being "the computerised planning of industrial, social, and military policy".

Alan Barnes maintained that, in addition to Pedler's fear of "spare-part surgery", the Cybermen were inspired by the ongoing Space Race; Sleight similarly found the inclusion of the space programme historically relevant. Barnes highlighted the Cold War as an effective historical backdrop for the serial's geopolitical story. He questioned if the Cybermen were meant to represent the Eastern Bloc nations otherwise absent, wondering whether they can "be perceived as figures of communism—as men created equal, but lacking individuality or soul". He similarly questioned the absence of Chinese and Russian staff, theorising that the Z-bomb may have "end[ed] the Cold War permanently". Barnes compared Cutler to two American generals of the Cold War—the real Curtis LeMay, and the fictional Jack D. Ripper from Dr. Strangelove (1964)—in their enthusiasm to deploy thermonuclear weapons. Clapham observed similarities between Cutler and the Cybermen being solely interested in survival at all costs—Cutler for his son, the Cybermen for themselves—but noted that such behaviour "may in fact not be acting out of kindness but from a veiled selfish interest".

Radio Times's Stephen Kelly found the Cybermen raised questions about whether it is emotions or physical body that "makes a human". Richard A. Hall recognised the Cybermen's interest in quantity of life instead of quality, citing their decision to remove emotions instead of halting modifications. Greg Littmann argued that Cybermen were "perfect ... heroes" according to Thomas Hobbes's laws of nature, preserving their own lives at the cost of attacking others, though noted Hobbes "would be horrified" by their removal of desire and emotions. (Note: Littmann posited how the Cybermen would have behaved according to several philosophers' thinking: Thomas Hobbes would have stopped them attacking others once they were safely established away from Mondas; John Stuart Mill would introduce a concern for others, stopping after Polly's speech; and David Hume would have them do nothing due to their complete lack of emotions.) Danny Nicol felt the Cybermen's absence of personality in contrast to the Doctor and Polly's personality differences "presents a potent message of the importance of being able to be oneself"; Walker similarly identified the Cybermen's lack of individuality in contrast to the humans' diversity. Simon Guerrier and Marek Kukula noted that Cybermen lack individual names in every appearance after The Tenth Planet, signifying further consequences of removing one's individuality. Sweet compared the Cybermen's mission with the studies of human vitality and longevity by Alex Comfort, whom Davis had met before employing Pedler.

Pedler and Davis later created the speculative fiction series Doomwatch, featuring similar environmental, scientific, and medical themes to The Tenth Planet. Sweet felt Mondas's death represented the death of natural resources in an increasingly cybernated world. Several writers identified a thematic parallel between Mondas and the Doctor, with energy being drawn from both, resulting in their eventual deaths (and the latter's regeneration). Tom A. Garner noted that regeneration is generally associated with reluctance rather than desire, as the Doctor has no wish to die, and Littman wrote that it raised questions of personal identity and whether it is connected bodily identity, Michael Hand argued that the distinct personalities of each Doctor demonstrated that identity was not solely connected to personality, while Paul Dawson found it was more related to the character's memories and psychological continuity.

== Commercial releases ==
Doctor Who and the Tenth Planet
- Author: Gerry Davis
- Cover artist: Chris Achilléos
- Series: Doctor Who book: Target novelisations
- Release number: 62
- Publisher: Target Books
- Publication date: 19 February 1976
- ISBN: 0-426-11068-4

A novelisation of The Tenth Planet, written by Davis and with cover art by Chris Achilléos, was published in hardcover by Allan Wingate and paperback by Target Books on 19 February 1976; (Note: It was the first novelisation of First Doctor stories to be published in the 1970s, after the first three published by Frederick Muller in the 1960s.) it was republished by Virgin Books with a cover by Alister Pearson on 18 February 1993, and again by BBC Books with Achilléos's cover and an introduction by Tom MacRae on 10 May 2012. The novelisation restored the original third episode and 2000 setting, and rewrote the regeneration scene; Jan Vincent-Rudzki, president of the Doctor Who Appreciation Society, criticised Davis's divergence from the televised serial. An audiobook of the novelisation—read by Wills, and with Cybermen voices by Nicholas Briggs and sound by Simon Power—was published on 7 December 2017.

The serial's audio, with linking narration by Wills, was released on a CD collection on 1 November 2004 (in a metal tin alongside The Invasion and The Origins of the Cybermen), as a single title in January 2006, in AudioGO's The Lost TV Episodes – Collection Three: 1966–1967 in August 2011, and as a vinyl record by Demon Records for Record Store Day on 12 April 2025. The initial version was ranked the second-best audio release of 2004 by DWM readers, though Bishop questioned the decision to omit any audio description of the Cybermen. Some of Hodgson's sounds from the serial (also used in 1970's The Ambassadors of Death) were issued on Out of This World in 1976, and the regeneration sound effect was featured in BBC Music's Doctor Who at the BBC Radiophonic Workshop Volume 1: The Early Years 1963–1969 in May 2000, while some of the stock music was included in Space Adventures in 1987 (re-issued in October 1998) and Doctor Who: The 50th Anniversary Collection in December 2013.

The Tenth Planet was released on VHS on 6 November 2000 alongside Attack of the Cybermen. The fourth episode was reconstructed by the Doctor Who Restoration Team (overseen by Ralph Montagu) using telesnaps, the off-air soundtrack, and brief 8 mm film clips recorded by an Australian viewer. Surviving clips from the fourth episode were included on the DVD set Lost in Time, published by BBC Worldwide in November 2004. Announced at Gallifrey One in February 2013, to celebrate Doctor Who's fiftieth anniversary, the serial was published in the Regeneration DVD box set by 2 Entertain on 24 June 2013, with an animated reconstruction of the fourth episode by Planet 55 Studios. This was re-released as an individual serial on 14 October, with special features including a behind-the-scenes documentary, a BBC Points West interview with Hartnell from 1967, and an audio commentary with cast and crew members. DVD Talk's Sinnott found the animation a vast improvement over The Ice Warriors, especially praising its animation and shadows, and several reviewers found Hartnell's interview the most important feature. The Tenth Planet (including the animated fourth episode) was added to BBC iPlayer alongside most other serials on 1 November 2023.

Miniature metal models of the Cybermen were issued by Harlequin Miniatures in 1999, followed by action figures by Character Options in 2009 and 2011 and in Eaglemoss's Doctor Who Figurine Collection in April 2015. Neil Sims created a Cyberman bust in 2008, and Head Up Display released a Cyberman helmet and full-size masked costume in 1999.

=== Soundtrack ===
Dr Who – Music from The Tenth Planet

Soundtrack album
- Released: November 2000
- Genre: Soundtrack
- Length: 19:07
- Label: Ochre Records

Doctor Who soundtrack chronology
Doctor Who at the BBC Radiophonic Workshop Volume 2: New Beginnings 1970–1980 (2000)	Music from the Tenth Planet (2000)	Doctor Who at the BBC Radiophonic Workshop Volume 3: The Leisure Hive (2002)

Ochre Records published Dr Who – Music from The Tenth Planet, a CD featuring stock music from the serial, in November 2000 to coincide with the VHS release. DWM's Bishop found the tracks appropriate but noted the soundtrack had "some padding" in the last two tracks (mostly unheard in the serial itself) despite its brief runtime. AllMusic's Bruce Eder similarly recognised the paucity and lamented the price but enjoyed the music.

No.	Title	Composer	Length
1.	"Blast Off!"	Roger Roger	2:24
2.	"Music for Technology"	Angela Morley	1:35
3.	"Power Drill"	Douglas Gamley	1:16
4.	"Space Adventure Part 1"	Martin Slavin	0:41
5.	"Space Adventure Part 2"	Slavin	1:25
6.	"Space Adventure Part 3"	Slavin	0:18
7.	"Drama in Miniature Part 1"	Dennis Farnon	1:32
8.	"Drama in Miniature Part 2"	Farnon	1:10
9.	"Machine Room"	Gamley	3:02
10.	"Drumdramatics 7"	Robert Farnon	2:33
11.	"Drumdramatics 10"	Farnon	3:09
Total length:			19:07

== Legacy ==
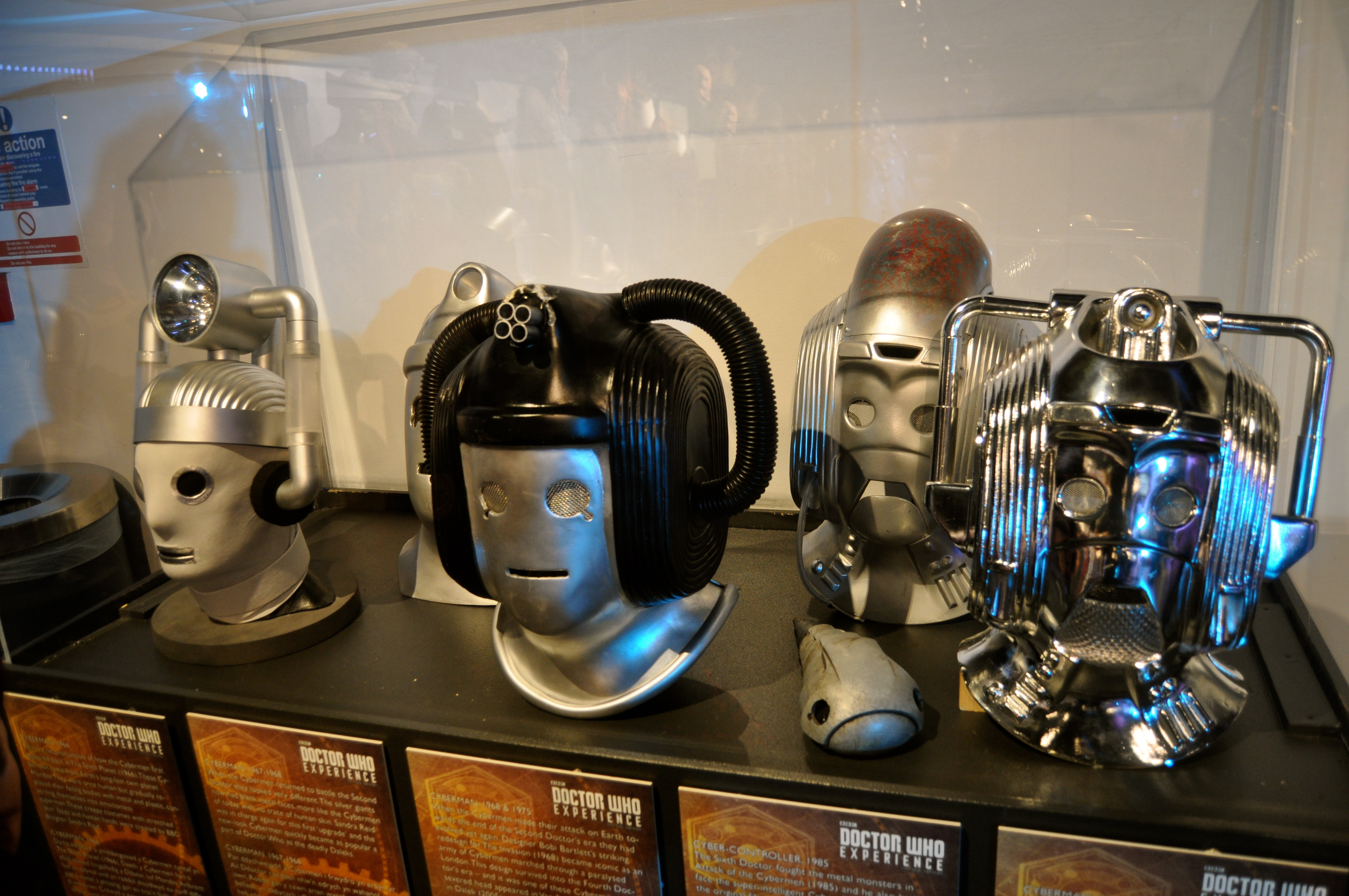
Undergoing several design modifications after their 1966 debut, the Cybermen became one of Doctor Who's most iconic villains.

The Cybermen "immediately caught the popular imagination", according to Peter Haining, and subsequently became one of Doctor Who's most iconic villains, alongside the Daleks. They returned in many stories, starting with the fourth-season serial The Moonbase (1967), undergoing several design changes. After their failure to save Mondas in The Tenth Planet, the Cybermen became a race of conquerors, focusing on the continuation of their species by mechanising other sentient species. John Kenneth Muir suggested that the Cybermen partly inspired the Borg, an alien group from Star Trek, first appearing in "Q Who", a 1989 episode of The Next Generation. The story of The Tenth Planet is revisited in the 1985 serial Attack of the Cybermen, and the original Mondasian Cybermen returned in the 2017 episodes "World Enough and Time" and "The Doctor Falls", featuring designs and voices similar to The Tenth Planet. Cybermen similarly appeared in several spin-off materials; an audio drama prequel to The Tenth Planet, Spare Parts, was released by Big Finish Productions in 2002, chronicling the origins of Mondas and the Cybermen.

The introduction of the concept of regeneration in The Tenth Planet is noted as a landmark moment in Doctor Who's history and been credited with establishing the programme's longevity by ensuring the Doctor's survival. Radio Times's Mulkern called it "a radical move that would ultimately guarantee the programme's longevity. Perhaps for ever." Den of Geek's Jeff Szpirglas named the regeneration among the programme's ten best cliffhangers, and io9's Wilkins ranked it as the fourth-best regeneration of the show's first ten. The 2017 Doctor Who episode "Twice Upon a Time" acts as a sequel to The Tenth Planet, taking place during the Doctor's regeneration; Steven Moffat, inspired by the Doctor's cut final lines from the original camera script, created an extended narrative of the First Doctor (portrayed by David Bradley) refusing to regenerate, upon which he meets the Twelfth Doctor (Peter Capaldi) who feels the same. Some scenes from The Tenth Planet were recreated for "Twice Upon a Time", with Jared Garfield and Lily Travers portraying Ben and Polly.

== Bibliography ==
=== Book and journal sources ===
- Britton, Piers D. (2021). Design for Doctor Who. Bloomsbury Academic. ISBN 978-1-350-11682-5.
- Brunt, David (10 May 2024). The Doctor Who Production Diary: The Hartnell Years. Telos Publishing. ISBN 978-1-845-83222-3.
- Campbell, Mark (2010). Doctor Who: The Complete Guide (2013 ed.). Constable & Robinson. ISBN 978-1-472-11038-1. LCCN 2013947988.
- Chapman, James (2006). Inside the TARDIS: The Worlds of Doctor Who (2013 ed.). I.B. Tauris. ISBN 978-1-780-76140-4.
- Chapman, James (March 2014). "Fifty Years in the TARDIS: The Historical Moments of Doctor Who". Critical Studies in Television: The International Journal of Television Studies. 9 (1): 43–61. doi:10.7227/CST.9.1.4. ISSN 1749-6020.
- Clapham, Mark; Robson, Eddie; Smith, Jim (2005). Who's Next: An Unofficial Guide to Doctor Who. Virgin Books. ISBN 978-0-753-50948-7.
- Collier, Laura; Gerzic, Marina (2023). "It's (Still) Alive! Re-imagining Frankenstein on Page and Screen". In Chua, Brandon; Ho, Elizabeth (eds.). The Routledge Companion to Global Literary Adaptation in the Twenty-First Century. Routledge. pp. 54–69. doi:10.4324/9781003038368-6. ISBN 978-1-003-03836-8.
- Cornell, Paul; Day, Martin; Topping, Keith (1995). The Discontinuity Guide. London: Virgin Books. ISBN 0-426-20442-5.
- Decker, Kevin S. (2013). Who is Who?: The Philosophy of Doctor Who. I.B. Tauris. ISBN 978-1-780-76553-2.
- Frankel, Valerie Estelle (2018). Women in Doctor Who: Damsels, Feminists and Monsters. Jefferson: McFarland & Company. ISBN 978-1-493-00016-6.
- Garner, Tom A. (2018). Echoes of Other Worlds: Sound in Virtual Reality. Palgrave Macmillan. doi:10.1007/978-3-319-65708-0. ISBN 978-3-319-65708-0. LCCN 2017949464.
- Geraghty, Lincoln (June 2008). "From Balaclavas to Jumpsuits: The Multiple Histories and Identities of Doctor Who's Cybermen". Journal of the Spanish Association of Anglo-American Studies. 30 (1): 85–100. ISSN 0210-6124. JSTOR 41055308.
- Guerrier, Simon; Kukula, Marek (2016). The Scientific Secrets of Doctor Who. BBC Books. ISBN 978-1-849-90939-6.
- Haining, Peter (1983). Doctor Who: A Celebration – Two Decades Through Time and Space. W. H. Allen. ISBN 0-491-03351-6.
- Hall, Alexander (2021). Evolution on British Television and Radio: Transmissions and Transmutations. Palgrave Macmillan. doi:10.1007/978-3-030-83043-4. ISBN 978-3-030-83043-4. ISSN 2731-4367.
- Hall, Richard A. (2021). "Cybermen". Robos in Popular Culture: Androids and Cyborgs in the American Imagination. ABC-CLIO. pp. 108–111. ISBN 978-1-440-87385-0. LCCN 2021008323.
- Harmes, Marcus K. (2014). Doctor Who and the Art of Adaptation. Rowman & Littlefield. ISBN 978-1-442-23284-6.
- Higgs, John (2025). Exterminate/Regenerate: The Story of Doctor Who. Hachette UK. ISBN 978-1-399-61479-5.
- Howe, David J.; Walker, Stephen James (2013). "The Smugglers". Doctor Who: The Television Companion. Vol. 1 (2021 ed.). London: Telos Publishing. pp. 145–146. ISBN 978-1-845-83156-1.
- Howe, David J.; Walker, Stephen James; Stammers, Mark (2005). Doctor Who: The Handbook. Vol. 1 (2016 ed.). London: Telos Publishing. ISBN 978-1-845-83941-3.
- Kausalik, Emily (13 November 2012). "The Sound's the Star". In Stanish, Deborah; Myles, L.M. (eds.). Chicks Unravel Time: Women Journey Through Every Season of Doctor Who. Mad Norwegian Press. pp. 211–217. ISBN 978-1-935-23412-8.
- Kistler, Alan (2013). Doctor Who: A History. Lyons Press. ISBN 978-1-493-00016-6.
- Knight, Rhonda (2022). "The Pedler-Davis Legacy: Cybermen in the Doctor Who Wilderness". In Knight, Rhonda; Quist, Donald (eds.). Who Makes the Franchise?: Essays on Fandom and Wilderness Texts in Popular Media. McFarland & Company. pp. 35–55. ISBN 978-1-476-64401-1.
- Leach, Jim (2009). Doctor Who. TV Milestones. Wayne State University Press. ISBN 978-0-814-33308-2. LCCN 2008051693.
- Lewis, Courtland; Smithka, Paula, eds. (2010). Doctor Who and Philosophy: Bigger on the Inside. Popular Culture and Philosophy. Vol. 55. Open Court Publishing Company. ISBN 978-0-812-69688-2. LCCN 2010038619.
  - Dawson, Paul. "And, Before I Go...". In Lewis & Smithka (2010), pp. 225–237.
  - Hand, Michael. "Regeneration and Resurrection". In Lewis & Smithka (2010), pp. 213–223.
  - Littmann, Greg (2010a). "Who Is the Doctor? For That Matter, Who Are You?". In Lewis & Smithka (2010), pp. 15–26.
  - Littmann, Greg (2010b). "Logically, What Would a Cyberman Do?". In Lewis & Smithka (2010), pp. 85–97.
- Mackley, J. S. (11 July 2020). "Doctor Who: Identity, Time and Terror". In Bloom, Clive (ed.). The Palgrave Handbook of Contemporary Gothic. Palgrave Macmillan Cham. pp. 801–818. doi:10.1007/978-3-030-33136-8_47. ISBN 978-3-030-33136-8.
- Markowitz, Judith A. (2019). Robots That Kill: Deadly Machines and Their Precursors in Myth, Folklore, Literature, Popular Culture and Reality. McFarland & Company. ISBN 978-1-476-63639-9. LCCN 2019010149.
- Marshall, Jonathan Paul (2013). "The intranet of the living dead: software and universities". In Whelan, Andrew; Walker, Ruth; Moore, Christopher (eds.). Zombies in the Academy: Living Death in Higher Education. Intellect. pp. 119–136. doi:10.2307/j.ctv36xw78w.12. ISBN 978-1-841-50714-9.
- Moore, Fiona; Stevens, Alan (2018). "Colonialism and Postcolonialism in the Cartmel and Davies Eras of Doctor Who". Foundation. 47 (131): 43–55. ISSN 0306-4964. ProQuest 2250504181.
- Muir, John Kenneth (1999). A Critical History of Doctor Who on Television. Jefferson, North Carolina: McFarland & Company. ISBN 978-0-786-40442-1.
- Nicol, Danny (2 February 2018). Doctor Who: A British Alien?. Palgrave Macmillan Cham. doi:10.1007/978-3-319-65834-6. ISBN 978-3-319-65834-6.
- Orthia, Lindy A. (2010). "'Sociopathetic Abscess' or 'Yawning Chasm'? The Absent Postcolonial Transition in Doctor Who". The Journal of Commonwealth Literature. 45 (2): 207–225. doi:10.1177/0021989410366891. hdl:10440/1261. ISSN 0021-9894.
- Orthia, Lindy A.; Harmes, Marcus K. (2021). "Concluding Remarks: Science in Twenties Doctor Who". In Harmes, Marcus K.; Orthia, Lindy A. (eds.). Doctor Who and Science: Essays on Ideas, Identities and Ideologies in the Series. McFarland & Company. pp. 221–225. ISBN 978-1-476-64200-0.
- Phillips, Ivan (2020). Once Upon a Time Lord: The Myths and Stories of Doctor Who. Bloomsbury Academic. ISBN 978-1-788-31646-0.
- Preddle, Jon (2011). Timelink: The Unofficial and Unauthorised Guide to Doctor Who Continuity. Vol. 1. Telos Publishing. ISBN 978-1-845-83004-5.
- Robb, Brian J. (2013). Timeless Adventures: How Doctor Who Conquered TV. Kamera Books. ISBN 978-1-843-44156-4.
- Shearman, Robert; Hadoke, Toby (14 December 2010). Running Through Corridors: Rob and Toby's Marathon Watch of Doctor Who. Vol. 1. Mad Norwegian Press. ISBN 978-1-93523-406-7.
- Sleight, Graham (2012). The Doctor's Monsters: Meaning of the Monstrous in Doctor Who. I.B. Tauris. ISBN 978-1-848-85178-8.
- Smith, Paul MC (July 2021). Based on the Popular BBC Television Serial (4th ed.). Wonderful Books. Archived from the original on 19 August 2022.
- Wright, Mark, ed. (7 September 2016). "The Savages, The War Machines, The Smugglers and The Tenth Planet". Doctor Who: The Complete History. 8 (27). London: Panini Comics, Hachette Partworks: 110–147. ISSN 2057-6048.
- Wright, Mark, ed. (23 January 2019). "'World Enough and Time'/'The Doctor Falls' and 'Twice Upon a Time'". Doctor Who: The Complete History. 89 (89). London: Panini Comics, Hachette Partworks. ISSN 2057-6048.
- Yanes-Fernandez, Inti A. (2017). "Byzantine Sacred Arts as Therapeutic Way: A Medieval 'Pharmakon' for the Cyberman". The International Journal of Religion and Spirituality in Society. 7 (4): 1–16. doi:10.18848/2154-8633/CGP/v07i04/1-16. ISSN 2154-8633. EBSCOhost 126366010.

=== Magazine and news sources ===
- Barnes, Alan, ed. (13 December 2000). "Doctor Who". Doctor Who Magazine. No. 298. Marvel Comics. p. 45. ISSN 0957-9818.
- Barnes, Alan (2 February 2005). Hickman, Clayton (ed.). "The Fact of Fiction: The Tenth Planet". Doctor Who Magazine. No. 352. Panini Comics. pp. 22–31. ISSN 0957-9818.
- Bishop, Vanessa (13 December 2000). Barnes, Alan (ed.). "Shelf Life". Doctor Who Magazine. No. 298. Marvel Comics. pp. 41–44. ISSN 0957-9818.
- Bishop, Vanessa (7 March 2001). Barnes, Alan (ed.). "Also released". Doctor Who Magazine. No. 301. Marvel Comics. p. 46. ISSN 0957-9818.
- Bishop, Vanessa (10 November 2004). Hickman, Clayton (ed.). "DWM Reviews: Doctor Who: Cybermen". Doctor Who Magazine. No. 349. Panini Comics. pp. 44–45. ISSN 0957-9818.
- Darlington, David (December 2013). Spilsbury, Tom (ed.). "Coming Soon... The Tenth Planet". Doctor Who Magazine. No. 466. Panini Comics. p. 75. ISSN 0957-9818.
- Davis, Clifford (6 August 1966). "Dr Who says: I am quitting". Daily Mirror. No. 19, 477. p. 1 – via Newspapers.com.
- Gillatt, Gary, ed. (June 1998). "The DWM Awards". Doctor Who Magazine. No. 265. Panini Comics. pp. 4–29. ISSN 0957-9818.
- Griffiths, Peter (14 October 2009). Spilsbury, Tom (ed.). "The Mighty 200!". Doctor Who Magazine. No. 413. Panini Comics. pp. 18–42. ISSN 0957-9818.
- Griffiths, Peter (July 2014). Spilsbury, Tom (ed.). "The First 50 Years". Doctor Who Magazine. No. 474. Panini Comics. pp. 12–69. ISSN 0957-9818.
- Hickman, Clayton, ed. (21 July 2004). "Gallifrey Guardian". Doctor Who Magazine. No. 345. Panini Comics. pp. 4–7. ISSN 0957-9818.
- Howe, David J. (20 September 2000). Barnes, Alan (ed.). "Eye of the storm". Doctor Who Magazine. No. 295. Marvel Comics. pp. 44–49. ISSN 0957-9818.
- Lenman, Jamie (August 2023). Hearn, Marcus (ed.). "60 Objects, 60 Years". Doctor Who Magazine. No. 593. Panini Comics. pp. 46–50. ISSN 0957-9818.
- Molesworth, Richard (15 November 2000). Gillatt, Gary (ed.). "Spare part surgery". Doctor Who Magazine. No. 297. Marvel Comics. pp. 26–28. ISSN 0957-9818.
- Pixley, Andrew (6 July 1994). Russell, Gary; Hearn, Marcus (eds.). "Archive Feature: The Tenth Planet". Doctor Who Magazine. No. 214. Marvel Comics. pp. 23–30. ISSN 0957-9818.
- Southall, J.R. (July 2015). Royce, Jordan (ed.). "Watching Doctor Who". Starburst. No. 414. pp. 40–41. ISSN 0955-114X. OCLC 79615651.
- Spilsbury, Tom (14 September 2005). Hickman, Clayton (ed.). "The 2004 DWM Awards". Doctor Who Magazine. No. 360. Panini Comics. pp. 50–52. ISSN 0957-9818.
- Spilsbury, Tom (May 2023). Hearn, Marcus (ed.). "The First Doctor". Doctor Who Magazine. No. 589. Panini Comics. pp. 26–29. ISSN 0957-9818.
- Sweet, Matthew (January 2014). Spilsbury, Tom (ed.). "The DWM Review: The Tenth Planet". Doctor Who Magazine. No. 468. Panini Comics. pp. 84–85. ISSN 0957-9818.

=== Home media sources ===
- Chapman, Chris (director/producer) (2013). Frozen Out: The Making of The Tenth Planet (documentary). 2 Entertainment.
- Walker, Stephen James (compiler) (2013). The Tenth Planet (Production Information Subtitles). 2 Entertain.
- Wills, Anneke; Matthews, Christopher; Cameron, Earl; White, Alan; Van Der Maaten, Donald; Dunham, Christopher; Kindred, Peter; Hadoke, Toby (2013). The Tenth Planet (audio commentary). 2 Entertain.
