= The Smugglers =

028 – The Smugglers
- Doctor Who serial
- Cherub holds Polly at gunpoint in front of the Doctor and Ben. The serial was noted for its violence; the only surviving footage is violent scenes cut from the Australian broadcast.

Cast
- Doctor: William Hartnell – First Doctor
- Companions: Anneke Wills – Polly; Michael Craze – Ben Jackson
- Others: Terence De Marney – Churchwarden; George A. Cooper – Cherub; David Blake Kelly – Jacob Kewper; Mike Lucas – Tom; Paul Whitsun-Jones – The Squire; Derek Ware – Spaniard; Michael Godfrey – Captain Pike; Elroy Josephs – Jamaica; John Ringham – Blake; Jack Bligh – Gaptooth

Production
- Directed by: Julia Smith
- Written by: Brian Hayles
- Script editor: Gerry Davis
- Produced by: Innes Lloyd
- Production code: CC
- Series: Season 4
- Running time: 4 episodes, 25 minutes each
- Episode(s) missing: All 4 episodes
- First broadcast: 10 September 1966
- Last broadcast: 1 October 1966

Chronology
← Preceded by The War Machines	Followed by → The Tenth Planet

The Smugglers is the first serial of the fourth season of the British science fiction television series Doctor Who. Written by Brian Hayles and directed by Julia Smith, it was broadcast on BBC1 in four weekly parts from 10 September to 1 October 1966. In the serial, the Doctor (William Hartnell) and his new travelling companions, Polly (Anneke Wills) and Ben Jackson (Michael Craze), arrive in seventeenth-century Cornwall and find themselves involved in the search for Captain Avery's hidden treasure while a smuggling ring masterminded by the local squire attempts to off-load contraband.

The Smugglers is one of the programme's last purely historical stories. Story editor Gerry Davis commissioned Hayles to write the scripts; the atmosphere reminded him of the Doctor Syn novels. The serial is Hartnell's penultimate in the leading role; his contract was renewed for one final serial. Smith was the second woman to direct Doctor Who, and cast several guest actors with whom she had previously worked. Her familiarity with Cornwall led to extensive location shooting in the area in June 1966, and the episodes were recorded in Riverside Studios in July.

The Smugglers received an average of 4.5 million viewers across the four episodes, a decrease from its predecessor; the third episode set a new low for Doctor Who, with 4.2 million viewers. Reviewers lauded the direction and performances, particularly Hartnell's, though some found the story derivative and reliant on caricatures. The videotapes and film prints were wiped by the BBC in the 1970s, and it remains missing; the only extant material includes brief footage censored from the Australian broadcast, telesnaps, and a complete off-air recording. The off-air recording was released as an audiobook and the footage on VHS and DVD, and the story was novelised by Terrance Dicks.

== Plot ==
The First Doctor and his new companions, Ben and Polly, arrive in the TARDIS on the coast of seventeenth century Cornwall. They meet churchwarden Joseph Longfoot, who lives in fear of Captain Avery's crew and imparts a cryptic message he calls "Deadman's secret key". After the time travellers leave, Longfoot is visited by Cherub, his former shipmate under Avery on the Black Albatross. Cherub and Captain Samuel Pike, Avery's successor, want to recover Avery's gold. Pike is convinced that Longfoot knows the treasure's whereabouts. Cherub kills Longfoot, who mentioned the three travellers.

The local Squire charges Ben and Polly with the murder of Longfoot, causing them to split up. Ben hides at the church and meets Josiah Blake, a revenue man tracking the local smugglers. The Doctor is kidnapped by Cherub and taken to the Albatross. Pike forms an alliance with the Squire, who is the organiser of the smuggling ring and offers to cut Pike and his pirates in. They are interrupted by Polly, who has come to implore the Squire to help her find the Doctor.

Pike, Cherub, and the Squire capture Polly and Ben, and take them to the church. They attempt to convince Blake that Ben and Polly are the true smugglers. Knowing the truth, Blake pretends to arrest Ben and Polly. The Doctor escapes and meets up with his friends in the churchyard. Blake works out a smuggling drop is due and heads off for more revenue men to break the smuggling ring.

The alliance collapses, as the Squire recognises the pirate's dishonour. Cherub, the Squire, and the time travellers set off to find the gold. The Doctor deciphers Longfoot's hint pertains to graves in the crypt but the other seekers arrive before he can find the treasure. Cherub wounds the Squire and forces the Doctor to confess the hint. Cherub concludes that Deadman too is a name in the crypt, but is slain by a vengeful Pike, who now threatens the village. The Doctor bargains with Pike for the lives of the villagers if he shows him the treasure and they find the gold at the intersection of the hinted graves.

As Pike finds the treasure, Blake and an armed patrol arrive. Aided by the injured and repentant Squire, Blake kills Pike, and the pirate force is routed. As the battle ends, the Doctor and his companions slip away to the TARDIS.

== Production ==
=== Conception and writing ===
After writing The Celestial Toymaker (1966) for Doctor Who's third season, Brian Hayles submitted several story ideas, which were rejected by the programme's script editor, Donald Tosh, in early 1966. Tosh's successor, Gerry Davis, commissioned one of Hayles's storylines, The Nazis, on 8 March, but it was soon put aside in favour of a new story; (Note: Doctor Who and the Nazis was later rejected on 15 June 1966; Davis felt the setting was too recent and wanted to focus on "escapist futuristic science-fiction stories". Hayles drafted another storyline, Doctor Who and the Hounds of Time, though no scripts were written.) Davis commissioned The Smugglers on 4 April, with four scripts due within two weeks. Wanting a romantic historic era story, he approved Hayles's seventeenth-century suggestion, reminded of the atmosphere of novels featuring Doctor Syn. Hayles was not particularly happy about writing a historical story. He delivered the first three scripts on 12, 20, and 28 April, and the fourth on 5 May. The Smugglers was one of the last purely historical stories, the second set in Britain's past, and the first not to be set in a specific time period; only a general seventeenth-century setting (Note: Jonathan Morris noted that an eighteenth-century setting would have been more appropriate considering the past-tense references to Henry Avery.) is specified.

Julia Smith was assigned to direct The Smugglers, the second woman to direct Doctor Who after The Massacre's Paddy Russell. The first woman to undertake the BBC's internal director course, Smith was partly chosen due to her knowledge of Cornwall. The serial's designer, Richard Hunt, had previously worked on Galaxy 4 and "Mission to the Unknown" for the third season. The Smugglers was the last Doctor Who serial to be overseen by costume designer Daphne Dare, who had worked on the series since The Daleks (1963–1964), and the first to involve make-up supervisor Gillian James, who had succeeded Sonia Markham. The serial is one of few without any incidental music.

=== Casting and characters ===
Smith felt Doctor Who was taking its toll on William Hartnell, who had become indecisive about whether to continue his role as the Doctor. Hartnell's contract expired at the end of The Smugglers and the producers planned to write him out of the programme; he was contracted for one final serial. Hartnell felt awkward with his new co-stars, Anneke Wills and Michael Craze as Polly and Ben, with whom his working relationship was not as strong as their predecessors. Craze enjoyed working on The Smugglers. Gordon Craig doubled for Hartnell in location shots of the Doctor being kidnapped, while Albert Ward doubled for Hartnell's hands while playing cards, as he had done in The Romans (1965) and The Celestial Toymaker.

David Blake Kelly and Mike Lucas were cast as Jacob Kewper and Mike, respectively, on 1 June 1966; Kelly had appeared in the Doctor Who serial The Chase (1965). Smith cast George A. Cooper as Cherub on 2 June, having worked together on An Age of Kings (1960), and John Ringham and Paul Whitsun-Jones as Josiah Blake and the Squire on 3 June; Ringham had appeared in the Doctor Who serial The Aztecs (1964) and worked with Smith on An Age of Kings and Jury Room (1965), and Whitsun-Jones had known Smith from her theatre experience. Terence De Marney, cast as Longfoot, had given Smith a job as a stage manager, and she had cast him in Letter to a Soldier, Dr. Finlay's Casebook, and Jury Room. Elroy Josephs, who portrayed Jamaica, was the first black actor in a speaking role in Doctor Who.

Derek Ware, an actor and stuntman who had intermittently worked on Doctor Who since its first serial in 1963 and with Smith on An Age of Kings, worked closely with Smith on the stunt work for The Smugglers, supplying ten stuntmen through his agency, Havoc. One of the stuntmen, Terry Walsh, regularly appeared on the programme in subsequent years, including as a double for Jon Pertwee and Tom Baker, while another stuntman, Buddy Windrush, had previously appeared in the third-season serial The Daleks' Master Plan (1965–1966). Ware was cast as Spaniard, who was involved in several action scenes, but was disappointed to learn the character lacked dialogue. Ware later recalled that a stunt mattress was moved before recording, causing him to break his thumb and injure his arm. Ware also doubled for Ringham in some scenes.

=== Filming ===
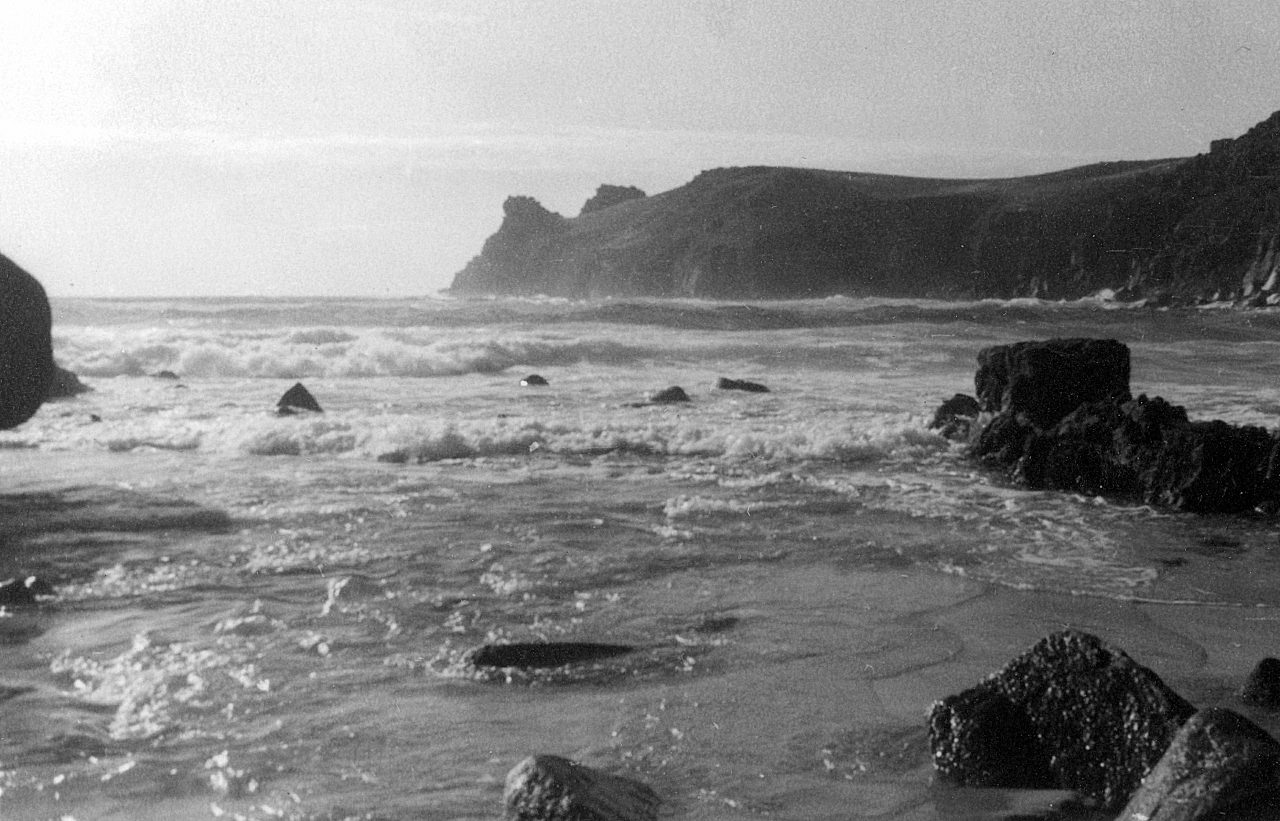
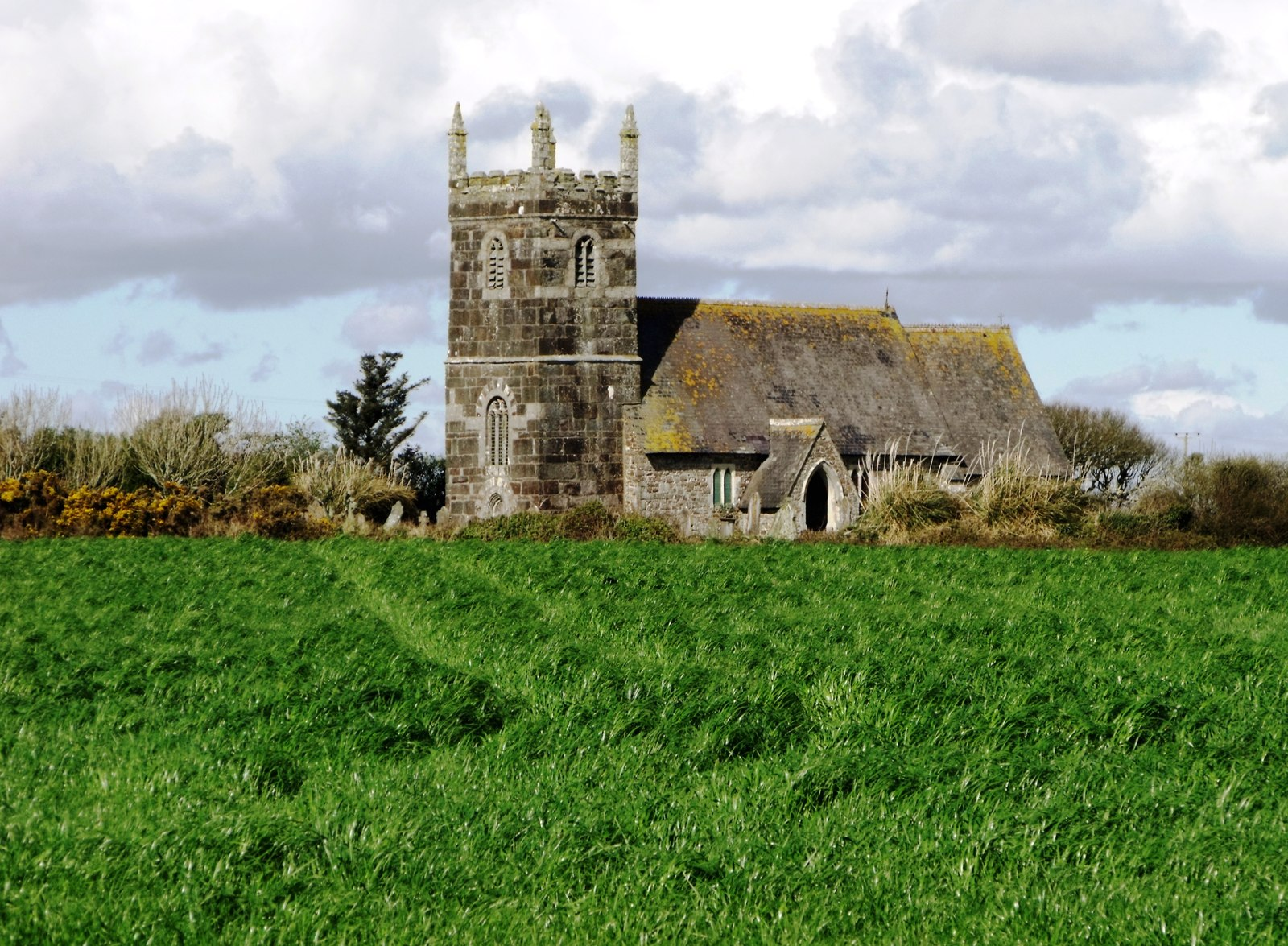
Location filming took place at Nanjizal and St Grada Church in Cornwall.

The Smugglers was recorded at the end of Doctor Who's third production block alongside most of the third season. The serial was the programme's first major location shoot; most location filming had been brief and limited to nearby locations, whereas The Smugglers was granted a five-day shoot in Cornwall. Smith scheduled recording around the regular cast members, as they were filming the preceding serial, The War Machines (1966), around the same time; she took particular care with Hartnell, who had experienced a difficult production year, and ensured his work would be burdenless. Hartnell, Wills, and Craze travelled to Penzance on 18 June, the day after recording the second episode of The War Machines. Cast members were paid a subsistence fee and £7.80 for a second class return train ticket.

35 mm film location filming began on 19 June in Nanjizal, for which the TARDIS prop was transported from London. The first shots focused on the regular cast; Hartnell was soon able to return to London, followed by Wills and Craze by the end of the day. Filming returned to Nanjizal the following day, focusing on the guest cast members; horses involved in production were provided by the Rose Hill School of Riding in Penzance. A camera car was used for tracking shots. Filming took place on 21 June at St Grada Church, Church Cove, and Trenethick Barton in Helston, on 22 June at Trethewey Farm in Trethewey, and on 23 June aboard the Bonny Mary at the harbour in Newlyn. Locals assisted as extras, including two Sea Cadets rowing the Lyonesse for scenes of the rowboat. Several crew members became seasick while filming on the Bonny Mary, including Smith. Rank Films provided some stock footage of a galleon for establishing shots of the Black Albatross, though Smith found the print quality too damaged to use.

Weekly four-day rehearsals for the serial started on 4 July, and recording took place in Studio 1 of Riverside Studios each Friday from 8 July. Hartnell was insistent that he operate the TARDIS in a specific manner, consistent with continuity in previous episodes. Craze was injured while rehearsing the fourth episode on 29 July, falling through an unsecured trapdoor. To make the fourth-episode fight appear larger, several stuntmen crawled out of frame before reentering as different characters. The first episode was budgeted at £3,212 but cost more, while the rest were budgeted at £2,580 each but cost less to compensate; recording cost a total of £10,481 (Note: The four episodes cost £4,261, £2,299, £1,552, and £2,369, respectively.) (equivalent to £170,482 in 2025). The programme subsequently took a summer break before the fourth production block.

== Reception ==
=== Broadcast and ratings ===
Episode	Title	Run time	Original release date	UK viewers (millions)	Appreciation Index
1	"Episode 1"	24:36	10 September 1966	4.3	47
2	"Episode 2"	24:27	17 September 1966	4.9	45
3	"Episode 3"	23:55	24 September 1966	4.2	43
4	"Episode 4"	23:37	1 October 1966	4.5	43

A 36-second trailer for The Smugglers, narrated by Martin Locke and edited by Pat Hubbard using location filming, was aired on BBC1 16 July 1966, immediately after the fourth episode of The War Machines. The serial was broadcast on BBC1 in four weekly parts from 10 September to 1 October, opening the programme's fourth season and establishing 5:50 p.m. as its regular slot. It received low viewership, averaging 4.5 million across its four episodes, attributed to its competition on ITV, Opportunity Knocks and Weavers Green. The first episode, with 4.3 million viewers, was a million lower than the third-season finale, The War Machines, and five million lower than the third-season debut, Galaxy 4. The third episode set a new low for Doctor Who, with 4.2 million viewers.

The serial was sold overseas from 1967, (Note: It was broadcast in Australia from May to June 1967, Barbados in June 1968, Zambia in October 1968, New Zealand in July 1969, Sierra Leone in 1970, and Singapore in 1972.) requiring four cuts of violence for the Australian broadcast. BBC Enterprises was still offering the serial for international sale when the original 405-line videotapes were wiped by 1974. The 16 mm Australian prints were returned in June 1975 and junked by 1977. All four episodes are missing from the BBC's archives; the only extant clips were those cut from the Australian broadcast: 23 seconds from the first episode, three clips totalling 21 seconds from the third, and three seconds from the fourth. Beside these, only telesnaps taken by John Cura and an off-air recording taken by a fan exist.

=== Critical response ===
The Sheffield Telegraph considered the first episode of The Smugglers among the best-written and -produced for a long time. The Listener's J. C. Trewin called the first two episodes "properly absurd" and "a sub-Treasure Island narrative", though by the serial's end had enjoyed the story. Doctor Who Magazine (DWM) readers generally ranked The Smugglers among the bottom half of the First Doctor's serials (Note: Of the First Doctor's 29 stories, The Smugglers was ranked 19th in 1998, 21st in 2009 and 2014, and 24th in 2023.) and the lower quarter of the programme's stories overall. (Note: The Smugglers was voted 121st of 159 total stories in 1998, 159th of 200 in 2009, and 194th of 241 in 2014.) David J. Howe and Stephen James Walker called The Smugglers "a lively and highly entertaining yarn" and a strong start to the fourth season. They felt the location filming effectively contributed to the serial's atmosphere and gave the production "a relatively high-budget look", and Radio Times's Patrick Mulkern found it "a terrific bonus that allows the production to breathe". DWM's Jonathan Morris noted the serial "seems to have been an unusually lavish and stylish production".

BBC executive Huw Wheldon led praise for Hartnell's performance, considering it "more light-hearted" after learning of his upcoming departure. In The Discontinuity Guide, Paul Cornell, Martin Day, and Keith Topping called Hartnell's performance "quite good", not showing signs that he was nearing the end of his tenure. Robert Shearman lauded Hartnell's comedic work, and Toby Hadoke recognised some errors in his lines but felt he demonstrated "traces of what makes him such a special Doctor". Howe and Walker thought Hartnell was "on top form ... effortlessly taking centre stage with his customary dignity, authority and mischievous twinkle in the eye", and lauded Craze and Wills. DWM's Morris felt the serial was strongest when focusing on Ben and Polly, praising their vibrant dynamic, mutual affection, and growing faith in the Doctor. Mark Clapham, Eddie Robson, and Jim Smith similarly lauded Craze and Wills, and felt the guest cast went appropriately "over the top while keeping the tone relatively serious". Howe, Stammers, and Walker felt the cast appeared to enjoy portraying "larger than life" characters; Radio Times's Mulkern highlighted Cooper, Michael Godfrey, and Whitsun-Jones, while Howe and Walker lauded Ringham's performance. DWM's Vanessa Bishop felt "it's hard to find a character that isn't a stereotype, or much in the way of memorable dialogue".

Several reviewers noted similarities between The Smugglers and works like Moonfleet (1898) and Jamaica Inn (1939). DWM's Morris found the story derivative, suffering from its historical focus; he suggested it may have contributed to the programme phasing out historical serials. He highlighted its "exceptionally bloodthirsty" focus on violence and called it "very much a product of its era", citing Jamaica's racist caricature, the frequent mentions of alcohol and tobacco, and the depiction of drunkenness. Radio Times's Mulkern similarly considered Jamaica "a dodgy caricature that would be inconceivable in modern drama". DWM's Bishop called the story "old-fashioned, predictable and, all told, just the kind of adventure Doctor Who was invented to replace". Clapham, Robson, and Smith similarly felt The Smugglers and The Highlanders (1966–1967) demonstrated Davis and Lloyd's "seemingly conservative attitude" in featuring settings easily accessible for other programmes. Mark Campbell enjoyed the characterisation and found the dialogue exaggerated, and Peter Haining lauded the serial's ambition, Smith's knowledge of Cornwall, and the production team's ability to transform the locations.

== Commercial releases ==
The Smugglers
- Author: Terrance Dicks
- Cover artist: Alister Pearson
- Series: Doctor Who book: Target novelisations
- Release number: 133
- Publisher: Target Books
- Publication date: 17 November 1988
- ISBN: 0-426-20328-3

A novelisation of The Smugglers, written by Terrance Dicks with cover art by Alister Pearson, was published in hardcover by W. H. Allen on 16 June 1988 and in paperback by Target Books on 17 November 1988; the latter was republished by Target on 18 February 1993. Wills read an audiobook of the novelisation, published on 6 August 2020, and the off-air recording of the serial, released as part of the BBC Radio Collection on 6 May 2002 and in AudioGO's The Lost TV Episodes – Collection Three: 1966–1967 in August 2011. Interzone's Paul Beardsley lauded Wills's narration.

Behind-the-scenes footage of the serial's recording, filmed on 8 mm in colour by Trethewey Farm owner Donald Trewern, was acquired for the unofficial documentary The Doctors: 30 Years of Time Travel and Beyond in 1995. Footage cut from the Australian broadcast was located in 1996 and featured in the documentary The Missing Years, included in the VHS set The Ice Warriors Collection by BBC Worldwide in November 1998 and the DVD set Lost in Time, published by BBC Worldwide in November 2004; the latter also featured Trewern's video footage.

Miniature metal models of the pirates were issued by Harlequin Miniatures in May 2000, and the Stamp Centre printed a limited edition cover of Polly in March 2004.

== Bibliography ==
=== Book and journal sources ===
- Brunt, David (10 May 2024). The Doctor Who Production Diary: The Hartnell Years. Telos Publishing. ISBN 978-1-845-83222-3.
- Bugden, David (15 May 2014). "'All Your Little Tin Soldiers': Doctor Who and the Language of the First World War". In Barr, Jason; Mustachio, Camille D. G. (eds.). The Language of Doctor Who: From Shakespeare to Alien Tongues. Bloomsbury Publishing. pp. 181–194. ISBN 978-1-442-23481-9.
- Campbell, Mark (2007). Doctor Who: The Episode Guide. Pocket Essentials. ISBN 978-1-90404-874-9.
- Chapman, James (2006). Inside the TARDIS: The Worlds of Doctor Who (2013 ed.). I.B. Tauris. ISBN 978-1-780-76140-4.
- Clapham, Mark; Robson, Eddie; Smith, Jim (2005). Who's Next: An Unofficial Guide to Doctor Who. Virgin Books. ISBN 978-0-753-50948-7.
- Cornell, Paul; Day, Martin; Topping, Keith (1995). The Discontinuity Guide. London: Virgin Books. ISBN 0-426-20442-5.
- Haining, Peter (1983). Doctor Who: A Celebration – Two Decades Through Time and Space. W. H. Allen. ISBN 0-491-03351-6.
- Harmes, Marcus K. (2014). Doctor Who and the Art of Adaptation. Rowman & Littlefield. ISBN 978-1-442-23284-6.
- Howe, David J.; Walker, Stephen James (2013). "The Smugglers". Doctor Who: The Television Companion. Vol. 1 (2021 ed.). London: Telos Publishing. pp. 145–146. ISBN 978-1-845-83156-1.
- Howe, David J.; Stammers, Mark; Walker, Stephen James (1994). Doctor Who: The Handbook – The First Doctor (1995 ed.). London: Doctor Who Books. ISBN 0-426-20430-1.
- Howe, David J.; Walker, Stephen James; Stammers, Mark (2005). Doctor Who: The Handbook. Vol. 1 (2016 ed.). London: Telos Publishing. ISBN 978-1-845-83941-3.
- Muir, John Kenneth (1999). A Critical History of Doctor Who on Television. Jefferson, North Carolina: McFarland & Company. ISBN 978-0-786-40442-1.
- Shearman, Robert; Hadoke, Toby (14 December 2010). Running Through Corridors: Rob and Toby's Marathon Watch of Doctor Who. Vol. 1. Mad Norwegian Press. ISBN 978-1-93523-406-7.
- Wright, Mark, ed. (7 September 2016). "The Savages, The War Machines, The Smugglers and The Tenth Planet". Doctor Who: The Complete History. 8 (27). London: Panini Comics, Hachette Partworks. ISSN 2057-6048.

=== Magazine and news sources ===
- Beardsley, Paul (August 2002). "Audio Reviews". Interzone. No. 181. pp. 60–61. ISSN 0264-3596.
- Bishop, Vanessa (26 June 2002). Hickman, Clayton (ed.). "The DWM Review: The Smugglers". Doctor Who Magazine. No. 318. Panini Comics. p. 46. ISSN 0957-9818.
- Cook, Benjamin (29 May 2002). Hickman, Clayton (ed.). "The Fall Guy". Doctor Who Magazine. No. 317. Panini Comics. pp. 18–24. ISSN 0957-9818.
- Freeman, John, ed. (December 1988). "Gallifrey Guardian". Doctor Who Magazine. No. 143. Marvel Comics. pp. 4–5. ISSN 0957-9818.
- Gillatt, Gary, ed. (2 August 1995). "Gallifrey Guardian". Doctor Who Magazine. No. 228. Marvel Comics. pp. 50–51. ISSN 0957-9818.
- Gillatt, Gary, ed. (June 1998). "The DWM Awards". Doctor Who Magazine. No. 265. Panini Comics. pp. 4–29. ISSN 0957-9818.
- Griffiths, Peter (14 October 2009). Spilsbury, Tom (ed.). "The Mighty 200!". Doctor Who Magazine. No. 413. Panini Comics. pp. 18–42. ISSN 0957-9818.
- Griffiths, Peter (July 2014). Spilsbury, Tom (ed.). "The 1960s". Doctor Who Magazine. No. 474. Panini Magazines. pp. 12–21. ISSN 0957-9818.
- Hearn, Marcus, ed. (September 2020). "Upcoming Releases". Doctor Who Magazine. No. 554. Panini Magazines. p. 73. ISSN 0957-9818.
- Hickman, Clayton, ed. (29 May 2002). "Time-Path Indicator". Doctor Who Magazine. No. 317. Panini Comics. p. 5. ISSN 0957-9818.
- Morris, Jonathan (21 March 2013). Spilsbury, Tom (ed.). "The Smugglers". Doctor Who Magazine. No. Special Edition 34: The Missing Episodes: The First Doctor. Panini Comics. pp. 70–71. ISSN 0963-1275.
- Pixley, Andrew (18 September 2002). Hickman, Clayton (ed.). "The DWM Archive: The Smugglers". Doctor Who Magazine. No. 321. Panini Comics. pp. 26–31. ISSN 0957-9818.
- Rigelsford, Adrian (27 September 1995). Gillatt, Gary (ed.). "Video Diary". Doctor Who Magazine. No. 230. Marvel Comics. pp. 14–15. ISSN 0957-9818.
- Spilsbury, Tom (May 2023). Hearn, Marcus (ed.). "The First Doctor". Doctor Who Magazine. No. 589. Panini Magazines. pp. 26–29. ISSN 0957-9818.
- Trewin, J. C. (22 September 1966). "Drama and light entertainment". The Listener. Vol. 76, no. 1956. BBC. pp. 432–433. ISSN 0024-4392.
- Trewin, J. C. (13 October 1966). "Drama and light entertainment". The Listener. Vol. 76, no. 1959. BBC. pp. 546–547. ISSN 0024-4392.
