= Lee Binding =

British graphic designer

Lee Binding (born 1975) is a graphic designer and digital painter who has worked on the television shows Doctor Who, Torchwood, The Sarah Jane Adventures, and various other works for BBC, Sky, Random House, Entertainment One, SFX Magazine and Big Finish Productions.

Binding worked at Visual Imagination between 1997 and 2000, primarily on the science-fiction/cult television magazine TV Zone, which he briefly edited. In 2001, he joined Contender Entertainment Group to oversee their range of science fiction DVDs, including Farscape, Andromeda and The Avengers UK releases. He supervised the design and creation of DVD value added materials, supervising the commentary tracks for the He-Man releases, and chairing the Dungeons & Dragons commentaries.

His graphical work on Doctor Who started with the Big Finish audio releases, before moving on to designing the website for the relaunched Doctor Who TV series in 2005. From there, he took over the covers for the BBC Book range of Doctor Who books from release 16, Forever Autumn. He is also responsible for the concept layout and covers for the Torchwood range of books. He also took over from Clayton Hickman as cover artist for the Doctor Who classic series DVD range. He also worked as chief graphic designer for the show, doing graphic design work for series 7 and Series 8.

His non-Doctor Who related work includes Fortitude, Top Gear, Hunderby, Jack and the Bean Stalk - After Ever After, I Hate Suzie, Game Of Thrones, Sick Of It, A League Of Their Own, Save Me, Hitmen and Civil Servant.

Binding's blog Glitter for Brains has been nominated for awards, most notably in The Pink Paper 2006 Awards where he came second in the category Best LGBT Blog. The blog was also joint winner of the web-based The Best of Blogs 2007 Award in the LGBT category.

Preceded by Jan Vincent-Rudzki	TV Zone Editor; 2000-2001	Succeeded by Tom Spilsbury
