= Kukula =

Kukula is a surname. Notable people with the surname include:

- Marek Kukula (born 1969), British astronomer and author
- Thomas Kukula (born 1965), German DJ, Eurodance musician, and music producer
- Kukula (born 1993), Cape Verdean footballer
- Wiesław Kukuła (born 1972), founding commander of Poland's Territorial Defence Force and current Chief of the General Staff of the overall Polish Armed Forces.
