= Martin Geraghty =

- Areas: Penciler, Inker
- Notable works: Doctor Who

Martin Geraghty is a comic book artist who lives and works in the UK.

== Biography ==
His first commission was for the Marvel UK comic Overkill but the comic folded before his story was published.

He began drawing for Doctor Who Magazine in 1993 and has continued to draw regularly for it ever since.

Outside comics Martin works in advertising.

== Bibliography ==
- Doctor Who
  - End Game (212 pages, ISBN 1-905239-09-2) collects:
    - "End Game" (with Alan Barnes, in Doctor Who Magazine #244-247)
    - "The Keep" (with Alan Barnes, in Doctor Who Magazine #248-249)
    - "Fire and Brimstone" (with Alan Barnes, in Doctor Who Magazine #251-255)
    - "Wormwood" (with Scott Gray, in Doctor Who Magazine #266-271)
  - The Glorious Dead (244 pages, 2006, ISBN 1-905239-44-0) collects:
    - "The Fallen" (with Scott Gray, in Doctor Who Magazine #273-276)
    - "The Road to Hell" (with Alan Barnes, in Doctor Who Magazine #278-282)
    - "The Glorious Dead" (with Scott Gray, in Doctor Who Magazine #287-296)
  - Oblivion (with Scott Gray, 228 pages, 2006, ISBN 1-905239-45-9) collects:
    - "Ophidus" (in Doctor Who Magazine #300-303)
    - "Beautiful Freak" (in Doctor Who Magazine #304)
    - "The Way of All Flesh" (in Doctor Who Magazine #306 and 308–310)
    - "Oblivion" (in Doctor Who Magazine #323-328)
  - The Flood (with Scott Gray, 226 pages, 2007, ISBN 978-1-905239-65-8) collects:
    - "The Land of Happy Endings" (in Doctor Who Magazine #337)
    - "The Flood" (in Doctor Who Magazine #346-353)
  - "The Warkeeper's Crown" (with Alan Barnes, in Doctor Who Magazine #378-380)
