= Tom Spilsbury =

British writer, magazine editor and journalist

- Born: 12 February 1976 (age 50) Swindon, England
- Areas: Writer, Editor
- Notable works: Doctor Who Magazine; TV Zone; Inside Soap; SFX; TV Choice; Total TV Guide

Tom Spilsbury (born 1976) is a British writer, magazine editor and journalist. As of 2021, he is a feature writer for TV Choice and Total TV Guide magazines. A former pupil of Bristol Cathedral School, he was, for ten years, editor of Doctor Who Magazine (DWM).

== TV Zone and Visual Imagination ==
Spilsbury started his career in journalism with Visual Imagination in 1999, where he contributed to many of the company's publications, including TV Zone, Starburst, Shivers, Film Review, Ultimate DVD, and Cult Times. He was then promoted to editor of TV Zone in 2001, which he edited for two years until 2003.

== Doctor Who Magazine ==
Spilsbury joined Doctor Who Magazine in March 2003, on Issue 330, becoming deputy editor to Clayton Hickman. He later took over from Hickman as editor in August 2007, with Issue 387. He redesigned and revamped the magazine with Issue 390, persuading Kylie Minogue to pose with a Dalek for the cover of the new look magazine in December 2007.

Spilsbury later became the first person to clock up 100 consecutive issues on DWM's staff with Issue 429 in December 2010, and later became the longest-serving editor of the title, overtaking Hickman in May 2013, and editing his 100th edition with Issue 486 in April 2015. He also oversaw the 500th issue of the magazine, and recreated the cover of the very first issue, explaining that he wanted 'something which somehow paid tribute to the past, as well as celebrating the present.' Reflecting on his long tenure on the magazine, Spilsbury said that "I just enjoy being a magazine editor. So I'd happily be a magazine editor for a different magazine! I don't suppose I'll be editing Doctor Who Magazine for the rest of my life" and noted that "you must never get complacent about it. Never ever think that these are the only people buying it."

While editing the magazine, Spilsbury interviewed subjects such as Freema Agyeman (Issues 392 and 393), Nicholas Courtney (Issue 402), Graeme Harper (Issues 380 and 392), and Steven Moffat (Issues 417/418, 447, 468/469, 484 and 515), amongst others. He also served as co-editor of the magazine's comic strip with Scott Gray, and wrote the regular Public Image column, which reports on the series' ratings, which he has continued to provide since his departure as editor.

Spilsbury has admitted to being greatly influenced by Radio Times, paying tribute to covers of the listings magazine on several occasions.

In 2015 Spilsbury appeared on BBC Worldwide's Doctor Who: The Fan Show, where he was complimentary about the episode The Witch's Familiar, and confirmed that the story he first remembered watching was Destiny of the Daleks A further episode in 2016 saw Spilsbury and his team appear as themselves in a spoof documentary, showing the production of Issue 500 of DWM.

On 12 July 2017 Panini UK announced Tom Spilsbury was stepping down as Doctor Who Magazine's editor after Issue 515 and would be succeeded by Marcus Hearn.

== Inside Soap ==
Spilsbury's first freelance work for Inside Soap magazine was an interview with director Graeme Harper in November 2010, about the tram crash seen in the 50th anniversary episodes of Coronation Street. Since leaving Doctor Who Magazine in 2017, Spilsbury initially contributed to Inside Soap as an occasional writer, before joining the full-time staff in 2018 as a regular writer and sub-editor, contributing stories on EastEnders, Coronation Street, Emmerdale and Hollyoaks. In March 2020, he took over editing Inside TV, the television section of the magazine, providing features on Red Dwarf, We Hunt Together, and Alan Carr's Epic Gameshow, among others.

== TV Choice and Total TV Guide ==
Spilsbury left Inside Soap in July 2021, and since then he has been a regular feature writer and interviewer for sister listings magazines TV Choice and Total TV Guide, published by Bauer Media Group.

== Other magazines ==
Spilsbury has occasionally contributed freelance articles to other magazines, including SFX features on Jean-Luc Picard of Star Trek in issue 324 (published February 2020) and an interview with Carole Ann Ford in issue 327 (published May 2020).

== Doctor Who DVD appearances ==
Spilsbury was a regular contributor to BBC Worldwide/2 entertain Ltd's Doctor Who DVD range, appearing as a talking head on documentaries for the Region 2 DVD releases of The Androids of Tara and The Armageddon Factor in 2007, The Rescue, The Deadly Assassin, The War Games and Enlightenment in 2009, Doctor Who (Doctor Who: The Movie) in 2010, and Inferno in 2013 – on which he appeared talking about the 'Other Eighth Doctor', David Burton, who allegedly made a new series of Doctor Who in the early 1990s, despite there being no photographic evidence of the production ever having been made. Spilsbury wryly noted that Burton's main claim to fame seemed to be that he possessed a car with the words 'the new Doctor Who' written on the side – but pointed out that anyone could have put that on the side of their car!

== Television and Radio appearances ==
Spilsbury has often been called on as a Doctor Who expert, appearing on BBC News and BBC Breakfast on several occasions. He was called on to comment on the departure of Matt Smith by BBC News on 1 June 2013, where he was asked about the controversial 'regeneration limit' of only 13 Doctors being allowed. Spilsbury commented that the writers had "just made that up," and so the writers could "make up something else." He later appeared in a discussion on BBC Breakfast over the identity of the new Doctor, revealed on 4 August 2013. When asked by presenter Naga Munchetty who he thought might be in the frame, Spilsbury praised names such as Olivia Colman. He also quipped that the reveal of a new Doctor was "like the Royal baby for sci-fi fans," with all the same speculation as to whether it would be a boy or a girl. When pushed who he thought would be cast, Spilsbury confirmed that he was as in the dark over the new Doctor's identity as everyone else. He stated that he wouldn't be surprised if a woman was cast in the role in the future, but doubted it would happen on this occasion. The same day he was the special guest on the BBC Radio Manchester show hosted by Eamon O'Neill and Jimmy Wagg, where they discussed the arrival of the new Doctor, and Tom suggested that he might be keeping it secret because he himself had taken the job! Later that evening, Peter Capaldi was revealed as the Twelfth Doctor. The next morning, Spilsbury was widely quoted saying that Capaldi "was brilliant already." A year later, when Capaldi made his full début as the Doctor in August 2014, Spilsbury returned to BBC Breakfast to give his full verdict, giving the new Doctor a thumbs up. BBC Radio Wales interviewed Spilsbury about the imminent series 10 of Doctor Who on 30 March 2017.

When Jodie Whittaker was cast as the Thirteenth Doctor in July 2017, Spilsbury appeared on numerous BBC local radio programmes to talk about her casting. He was challenged by Nicholas Pegg to include a William Hartnell-era episode title into each interview without the presenter noticing. Spilsbury accepted the challenge, culminating with the unlikely observation on BBC Radio Suffolk that Whittaker was like a Rider from Shang-Tu.

On 29 May 2012, he appeared in La Nuit Doctor Who, a television documentary for the French channel France 4.

On stage, Spilsbury hosted the Doctor Who Night at Ciné Lumiere on 19 January 2013, interviewing Toby Whithouse about his writing career.

In May 2018, Spilsbury hosted the first ever on-screen joint interview with former Doctor Who showrunners Russell T Davies and Steven Moffat for the BBC's official Doctor Who YouTube channel, as the two writers talked about their book adaptations of Rose and The Day of the Doctor.

In June 2018, he took part on a panel of Doctor Who experts to introduce a new audience to the 1963–89 run of the series, which was streaming on Twitch.

In October 2025, Spilsbury made a cameo appearance in episode 9332 of Neighbours, briefly appearing as a patron in The Waterhole.

== Newspaper interviews ==
As a commentator on Doctor Who (he was assistant editor of Doctor Who Magazine at the time), Spilsbury was among the first to get to see the relaunch of the show in 2005. He commented on the revival starring Christopher Eccleston and Billie Piper to The Guardian, saying "I really enjoyed it. Chris and Billie were great. It was great to see everyone else enjoying it. They laughed at the funny bits and were scared by the scary bits. It bodes very well for the series. I think kids will love it. It's exactly the sort of thing I fell in love with as a child. Christopher Eccleston still feels like a Doctor Who. He'll be looked back on by kids in 20 years' time as their doctor." In September 2015, Spilsbury was again interviewed by The Guardian about the new series of Doctor Who, commenting "I think it's a stronger run than last year. There are more two-part stories than we've had recently, which means the whole pace of the storytelling is a bit different. They've shaken it up, which is quite exciting."

== Popular culture ==
In the 50th anniversary Doctor Who story The Day of the Doctor the character of Coal Hill School teacher Tom (played by Tristan Beint) was named after Tom Spilsbury, a tribute by his close friend and writer of the episode Steven Moffat. The recurring character of Walford Gazette journalist Sarah-Jane Spilsbury, who first appeared in the 23 April 2018 episode of EastEnders played by Shannon Murray, was named after both Tom Spilsbury and the Doctor Who character Sarah Jane Smith, as both are also journalists. The episode was written by Johnny Candon, who had previously written articles for Spilsbury in Doctor Who Magazine.

== Awards ==
In May 2012, Spilsbury accepted the Eagle Award for Favourite British Comicbook (Colour) for his editorship of Doctor Who Magazine. Doctor Who's executive producer Steven Moffat tweeted his joy: "Punching the air @TomSpilsbury and team with an Eagle Award for Doctor Who Magazine! AMAZING!" Spilsbury himself tweeted his shock: "OH MY GOD, WE WON!!!"

In May 2016, Spilsbury accepted the certificate from the Guinness Book of Records, on behalf of Doctor Who Magazine, of World Record for the longest-running magazine based on a TV series, which it had been since 2010.

== Other media ==
Spilsbury assisted Nicholas Pegg on his book The Complete David Bowie, and was thanked for his contribution in the book. In September 2017 Spilsbury recorded a short audio contribution to mark the official 11th YouTube anniversary of colourisation artist Stuart Humphryes.

Preceded by Clayton Hickman	Doctor Who Magazine Editor; 2007–2017	Succeeded by Marcus Hearn
Preceded by Lee Binding	TV Zone Editor; 2001–2003	Succeeded by Anthony Brown
