= Roger Langridge =

New Zealand comics writer, artist, and letterer

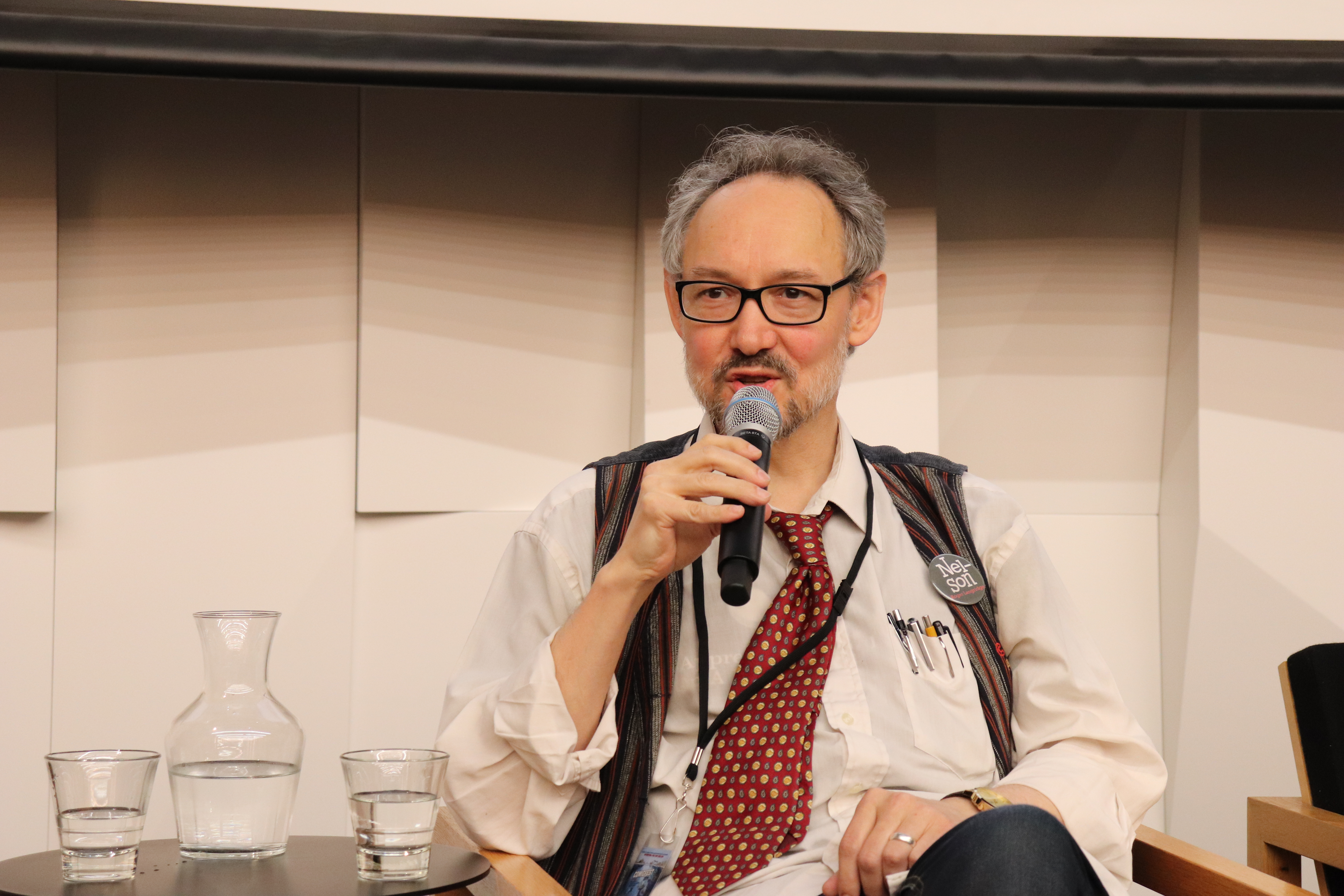
- Langridge in 2019
- Born: 14 February 1967 (age 59) New Zealand
- Areas: Writer, artist, letterer
- Awards: National Comics Award for Best Online Strip for Fred the Clown (2003)

Roger Langridge (born 14 February 1967) is a New Zealand comics writer, artist and letterer, currently living in Britain.

== Biography ==
Langridge originally came to public prominence most notably with the Judge Dredd Megazine series The Straitjacket Fits (written by David Bishop), a surreal, hallucinatory, convention-bending strip set in an insane asylum with a cast of characters who realised they were in a comic strip and burst from the edge of the frame. He had previously been a regular artist for the 1988 issues of the Auckland University Students' Association's magazine Craccum.

His cartoon style proved perfect for the series and he continued to work for the Megazine, in addition to a series of comedy books dedicated to his Buster Keaton-inspired character Fred the Clown, which he wrote and drew as a webcomic before self-publishing the material as small press titles. These were collected as a single volume by Fantagraphics Books in 2004. His work on Fred the Clown was nominated for two Eisner Awards, a Harvey Award, a Reuben Award and an Ignatz Award. Langridge also does illustration work.

He has also provided artwork for Shaenon Garrity's Smithson webcomic.

Langridge has provided the Fin Fang Four, with Scott Gray, first for Marvel Monsters, then a series of short stories and in late 2008 as a digital comic on Marvel Digital Comics Unlimited.

He was the writer, and usually the cartoonist for, Boom! Studios' The Muppet Show comics (2009–12).

In 2012, he scripted for IDW a four-issue Popeye miniseries, illustrated by Bruce Ozella, so successful that even before the second issue it was expanded into an "ongoing" series, according to Langridge.

For Doctor Who Magazine he did one-panel humorous images for the "Review" section. He also does a weekly illustration for the UK TV magazine Inside Soap.

== Bibliography ==
=== Comics ===
Comic work includes:

- Razor #8 Associates in "Searching" (with writer Cornelius Stone, 1988)
- Art d'Ecco (with Andrew Langridge, in Art d'Ecco #1–4, Fantagraphics, 1990–1992)
- Zoot! (with Andrew Langridge – six-issue series, Fantagraphics, 1993–1994)
- Knuckles the Malevolent Nun (with co-creator Cornelius Stone, in Knuckles No. 1 & 2, 1991 and A1 (Series 1) No. 5, 1991)
- "Frankenstein Meets Shirley Temple" (in A1 (Series 2) #1–4, 1992)
- Judge Dredd:
  - "Sponts A-Go-Go" (with Chris Standley and Paul Peart, Judge Dredd Lawman of the Future No. 14, 1996)
  - "Medusa" (with Alan Barnes and Paul Peart, Judge Dredd Lawman of the Future #19–20, 1996)
- The Straitjacket Fits (with David Bishop):
  - "The Straitjacket Fits" (in Judge Dredd Magazine #1.09–1.20, 1991–1992)
  - "The Final Fit" (in Judge Dredd Yearbook 1993 1992)
- Fred the Clown, Les Cartoonistes Dangereux, 1999
- "The Story of a Nut Gone Bad..." (in Flinch No. 13, DC, 2000)
- Fred the Clown #1–5, self-published, 2001–2002.
- Batman: "Auteurism" (with John Arcudi, in Legends of the Dark Knight #162–163, DC, 2003)
- "Abe Sapien Star of the B.P.R.D." (with John Arcudi, in Hellboy: Weird Tales, No. 4, Dark Horse, 2003)
- Whatever Happened To?: "Cookie" (with Simon Spurrier, in Judge Dredd Megazine #2.17, 2004)
- Fett Club (with Kevin Rubio, in Star Wars Tales 24, Dark Horse, 2005)
- A story in the Bizarro World anthology, DC, 2005.
- Marvel Monsters: "Fin Fang Four" (with Scott Gray, 2005)
- "Moleman's Christmas" (with Shaenon Garrity, in Marvel Christmas Special No. 1, Marvel, 2006)
- "How Fin Fang Foom Saves Christmas " (with Scott Gray, in Marvel Christmas Special 2006 No. 1, Marvel, 2007)
- "Return of the Fin Fang Four: Shrink Rap" (with Scott Gray, in Avengers Giant-Size No. 1, Marvel, 2008)
- The Muppet Show (Boom Studios, 2009)
- Thor: The Mighty Avenger (Marvel, 2010)
- Muppets Presents: Family Reunion (Marvel, 2011)
- John Carter of Mars: A Princess of Mars #1–5 (Marvel, 2011)
- Snarked! #0,1–12 (Boom! Studios, 2011–2012)
- Popeye #1–12 (IDW Publishing, 2012–2013)
- The Rocketeer: Hollywood Horror #1–4 (IDW Publishing, 2013)
- King:Mandrake the Magician No. 1 (Dynamite Entertainment, 2015)
- Fred the Clown, The Iron Duchess, (Self-Published, 2016)

=== Collections ===
Collections:

- Knuckles the Malevolent Nun 1: No More Mrs. Nice Nun, with Cornelius Stone, Antipodes Publishing, 2003.
- Fred the Clown, Fantagraphics Books, 2004.
- The Louche and Insalubrious Escapades of Art d'Ecco, with Andrew Langridge, Fantagraphics Books, 2006.
