= Craig Yoe =

American historian (born 1951)

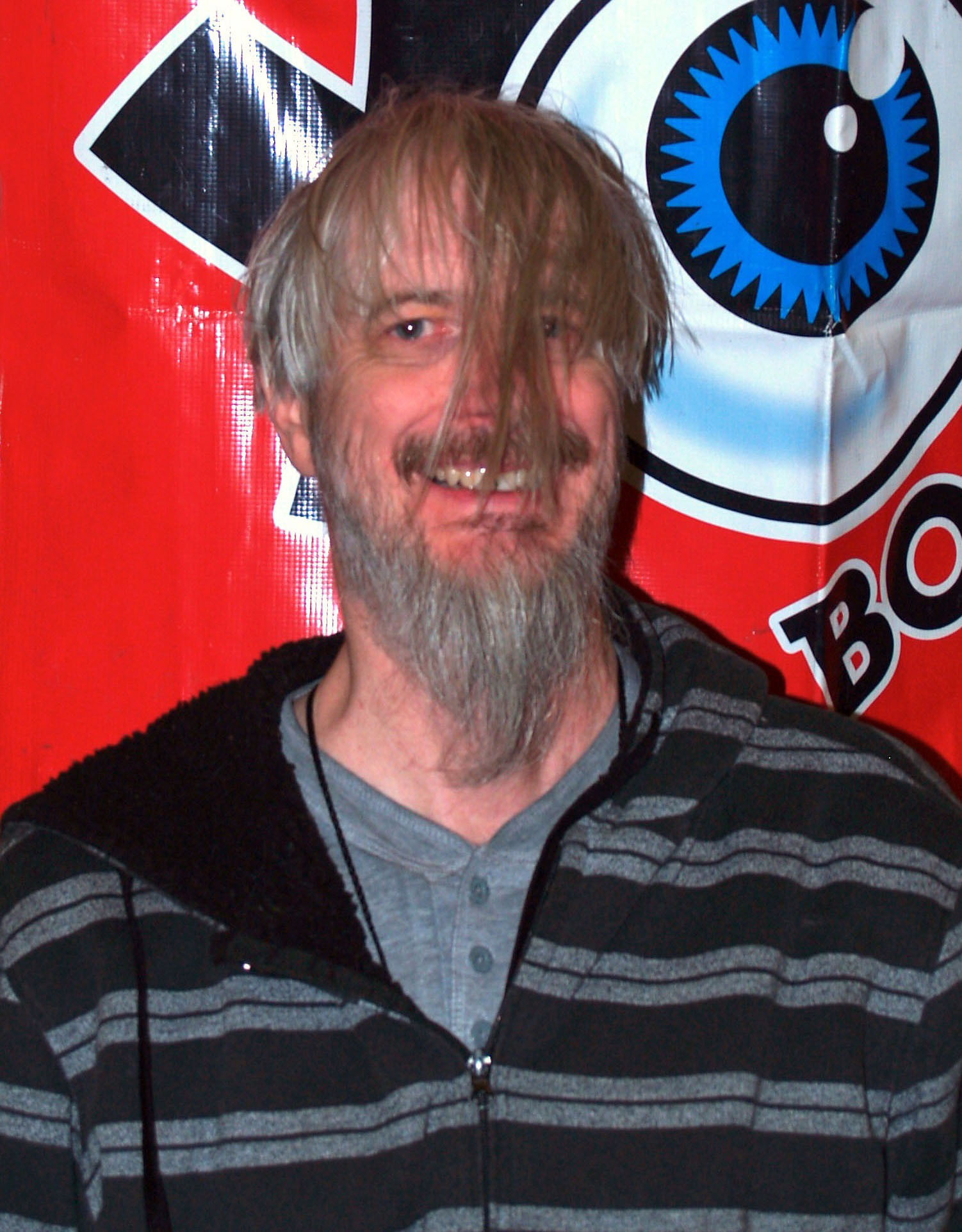
- Yoe in April 2016
- Born: February 23, 1951 (age 75) Des Moines, Iowa, U.S.
- Areas: Cartoonist, Writer, Publisher
- Notable works: Yoe Books
- Awards: Full list
- Spouse: Clizia Gussoni

Craig Yoe (/joʊ/; born February 23, 1951) is an American author, editor, art director, graphic designer, cartoonist and comics historian, best known for his Yoe! Studio creations and his line of Yoe Books.

== Early life ==
Craig Yoe was born in Des Moines, Iowa. He attended Firestone High School in Akron, Ohio and the University of Akron before dropping out to concentrate on counter-cultural activities and the anti-war movement.

== Career ==
In the early 1970s Yoe was a leader in the Akron Jesus People movement, creating a newspaper/Christian comic first called The Acorn and, later, Jesus Loves You. In 1970, Yoe commissioned legendary surf artist and friend Rick Griffin to do the painting Rock of Ages which became the cover for Jesus Loves You (published by Zondervan).

Early in his career, Yoe was senior designer at Marvin Glass and Associates, where he worked on Cabbage Patch Kids and My Little Pony toys. Recruited by Jim Henson, Yoe became the creative director and general manager of the Muppets, working on everything from theme parks to television shows. After Henson's death, Yoe opened his own company, Yoe! Studio, working in the entertainment and licensing fields and creating publications, style guides, packaging, press kits, logos, and toys. Yoe! Studio client list includes Kellogg’s, Disney, Cartoon Network, Nickelodeon, Marvel, DC Comics, and even IMAX. Clizia Gussoni is Yoe's wife, business partner and the co-creative director of Yoe! Studio.

Yoe also handled Big Boy Restaurants' promotional comic book Big Boy Magazine – the successor to the Adventures of the Big Boy comic book – as he discussed with Steven Heller:

We produce everything from start to finish. We interview celebrities from Britney Spears (when she was more wholesome, remember?) to SpongeBob SquarePants. We produce the comic stories that are still the heart of the publication. Luke McDonnell, another Marvel graduate, is our staff artist at Yoe! Studio. Luke is an incredible visual storyteller who gives Big Boy and friends a delightful modern flair. We get freelance writers Craig Boldman and Bob Supina to do the scripts. When she has time, my business partner, Clizia Gussoni, pens some of the stories with her own magic. It goes from our printer right to the warehouse that houses all the food and napkins, then is trucked to the individual restaurants across the country. The kids love ’em. We get many enthusiastic letters and incredible drawings of Big Boy that we include in each issue.

As of 2010 Yoe is an adjunct professor of art at Syracuse University.

Yoe worked for Dark Horse Comics as an editor until 2026. In July 2026, history professor Rafael Medoff claimed Yoe, in his capacity as an editor for dark Horse, had blocked the publication of a collection of political cartoons published about, and during, the Holocaust, unless Medoff prepended a statement written by Yoe. The statement allegedly likened Holocaust death camps to Donald Trump's immigration policies. In his response, Yoe stated Medoff's account had "a number of errors," without specifying. Dark Horse Comics stated that the anthology went unpublished due to delays on the part of Yoe.

== Personal life ==
Yoe is married to Clizia Gussoni, who is also his creative partner, with whom he has had 3 children.

Yoe currently resides in Baguio.

== Awards ==
- Gold Medal from the Society of Illustrators
- Addy Award (for his MTV station ID)
- Eisner Award
- 4th Annual Jerry Bails Award For Excellence in Fandom, at 2013 Detroit Fanfare
- Inkpot Award

== Books ==
Yoe followed The Art of Mickey Mouse (co-author Janet Yoe-Morra, Rizzoli, 1991) with books for several different publishers: The Mighty Big Book of Optical Illusions (Price Stern Sloan, 2002), Clean Cartoonists’ Dirty Drawings (Last Gasp, 2007), Secret Identity: The Fetish Art of Superman’s Co-creator Joe Shuster (Abrams, 2009), The Great Anti-War Cartoons (Fantagraphics, 2009), Boody (Fantagraphics, 2009) and Krazy Kat & the Art of George Herriman: A Celebration (Abrams, 2011).

In 2012, Yoe co-edited IDW's Popeye comic book miniseries, illustrated by Bruce Ozella.

=== Yoe Books / IDW ===
In 2010, Yoe launched his own imprint, Yoe Books, with IDW.

- The Art of Ditko (January 2010)
- The Complete Milt Gross Comic Books and Life Story (February 2010)
- Dan DeCarlo's Jetta (March 2010)
- The Golden Collection of Klassic Krazy Kool Kids Komics (April 2010)
- Felix the Cat’s Greatest Comic Book Tails (August 2010)
- Dick Briefer's Frankenstein (October 2010)
- Barney Google: Gambling, Horse Races & High-Toned Women (October 2010)
- The Great Treasury of Christmas Comic Book Stories (November 2010)
- Popeye: The Great Comic Book Tales by Bud Sagendorf (February 2011)
- Krazy & Ignatz in Tiger Tea (April 2011)
- Archie: A Celebration of America's Favorite Teenagers (May 2011)
- Archie's Madhouse (August 2011)
- Amazing 3-D Comics! (August 2011)
- Barks' Bear Book (September 2011)
- Bob Powell's Terror: The Chilling Archives of Horror Comics (November 2011)
- Frazetta Funny Stuff (May 2012)
- Zombies: The Chilling Archives of Horror Comics (with Steve Banes) (June 2012)
- The Creativity of Ditko (August 2012)
- Little Penis: A Finger Puppet Parody Book (2012)
- Comics About Cartoonists: Stories About The World's Oddest Profession (January 2013)
- Ditko Monsters: GORGO! (March 2013)
- Jack Cole's Deadly Horror: The Chilling Archives of Horror Comics (October 2013)
- Haunted Horror: Banned Comics from the 1950s: The Chilling Archives of Horror Comics (with Steve Banes and Clizia Gussoni) (November 2013)
- Felix the Cat Paintings (April 2014)
- Alice in Comicland (with Mark Burstein) (May 2014)
- The Worst of Eerie Publications: The Chilling Archives of Horror Comics (Mike Howlett) (November 2014)
- Haunted Horror: Comics Your Mother Warned You About: The Chilling Archives of Horror Comics (with Steve Banes and Clizia Gussoni) (November 2014)
- Ditko's Shorts (with Fester Faceplant) (December 2014)
- Howard Nostrand's Nightmares: The Chilling Archives of Horror Comics (December 2014)
- Tom Sutton's Creepy Things: The Chilling Archives of Horror Comics (Michael Ambrose and Donnie Pitchford) (January 2015)

=== Children's Books for Mango Publishing ===
In 2020, Craig Yoe and Mango Publishing launched a series of four children's books titled "Squeaky Clean, Super Funny."

- Squeaky Clean Super Funny: Jokes! For Kidz (June 2020)
- Squeaky Clean Super Funny: Knock Knock Jokes! For Kidz (June 2020)
- Squeaky Clean Super Funny: Riddles! For Kidz (July 2020)
- Squeaky Clean Super Funny: School Jokes! For Kidz (August 2020)
