= Bruce Ozella =

American cartoonist (born 1958)

Bruce Ozella's Popeye #1 (April 2012), page 16.

Bruce Ozella (born November 10, 1958) is an American cartoonist, best known for his revival of Popeye in 2012.

After study at Boston's New England School of Art & Design, Ozella worked as a graphic designer and illustrator in Boston for more than 30 years, producing advertising concepts, brochures, cartoons, flyers, magazine and newspaper ads, pamphlets, posters, programs and public relations materials.

== Comic books ==
In 2011-12, for IDW, writer-artist Roger Langridge scripted a four-issue Popeye miniseries, with Ozella illustrating issues #1 and #4. Shaun Manning, writing for Comic Book Resources, noted:

Langridge is working with newcomer artist Bruce Ozella for the series, an artist whose appeal once again rests in evoking the classic Popeye strips of yore. Asked what Ozella's style brings to a series like Popeye, Langridge said simply, "You mean apart from his uncanny ability to draw like E. C. Segar? I'm not sure you need anything else!"

Comics historian Adrian Kinnaird described Ozella's cartooning as "a dead-ringer for Segar". The Popeye miniseries, co-edited by IDW founder Ted Adams and designer Craig Yoe, was launched in April 2012. Critic PS Hayes commented:

Langridge writes a story with a lot of dialogue (compared to your average comic book) and it's all necessary, funny, and entertaining. Bruce Ozella draws the perfect Popeye. Not only Popeye, but Popeye's whole world. Everything looks like it should, cartoony and goofy. Plus, he brings an unusual amount of detail to something that doesn't really need it. You'll swear that you're looking at an old Whitman Comics issue of Popeye, only it's better. Ozella is a great storyteller and even though the issue is jam packed with dialog, the panels never look cramped at all.

Greg McElhatton of Read About Comics reviewed:

I'd never heard of Ozella before, but I like his art here. It's exactly in Segar's style, with the rounded heads, wiggly lines radiating out of people's heads, and gruff expressions. Bluto just radiates menace, and his assistant looks like a huge slab of beef just ready to attack. He's got a fun sense of motion for his characters, with Popeye's arms whirling around like a windmill, or the way that he leaps and bounds through the air. It's completely in character with what Segar did before, but it also manages to keep from feeling old-fashioned or less than natural; that's a feat that few comic artists can manage when mimicking another artist's style.

On May 9, Rich Johnston, on Bleeding Cool, reported, "IDW received 11,569 preorders for Popeye #1 from comic retailers by the FOC date. As a result, they printed 13,400 copies. Those extra 2,000 copies have now also sold out, leading to a second print." According to Langridge, the sales of Popeye #1 were so successful that even before the second issue it was expanded into an "ongoing" series.

== Books ==
In 1997, Ozella illustrated Boston Park Rangers Nature Book by Joy Reo, with themes of urban ecology and nature conservation.

Ozella lives in Boston with his wife and son.
