= Clayton Hickman =

British magazine editor (born 1977)

Clayton James Hickman
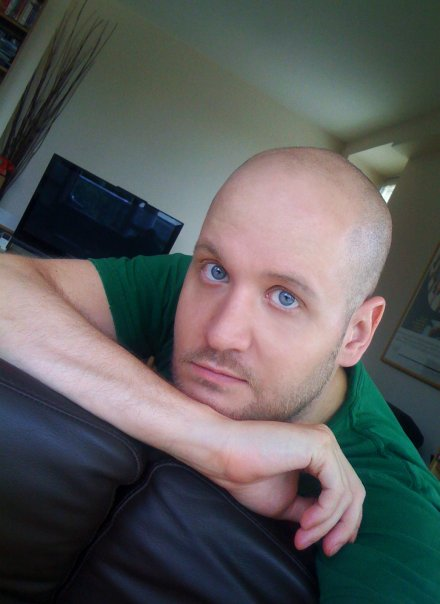
- Clayton Hickman in 2010
- Born: Clayton James Hickman; 5 January 1977 (age 49); Bristol, England
- Occupations: Scriptwriter, journalist, designer
- Years active: 1999–present

Clayton James Hickman (born 5 January 1977, in Bristol) is a British scriptwriter, magazine editor, journalist and designer.

== Magazine work and DWM ==
Hickman's first published work was in SFX. Hickman officially joined the magazine industry in 1999, when he moved to London, England to become the Editorial Assistant on Film Review for Visual Imagination. He remained there until August 2000. During this period he also wrote for Cult Times, Xena Magazine, TV Zone and Doctor Who Magazine. Hickman joined Panini Comics' Doctor Who Magazine as Assistant Editor to Alan Barnes in 2000, and ascended to editor in January 2002 until August 2007. This period saw the return of Doctor Who to regular television production and many necessary changes to the almost 25-year-old magazine. As well as preparing twice-yearly Special Editions for DWM, between 2005 and 2009 Hickman was also editor of Panini's annual publication The Doctor Who Storybook. He also oversaw the creation of the company's range of Doctor Who graphic novels, on which he worked as editor and designer for the first 10 volumes. In 2010, with the cancellation of the Storybook, he was approached by BBC Books to edit a new, lavish hardback for the Christmas market – The Brilliant Book of Doctor Who 2011. The book sold well and fetched excellent reviews on the market. He was later asked to produce a 2012 volume.

== Scriptwriting ==
As a writer, Hickman has contributed to Big Finish's Doctor Who range of audios and short story collections in collaboration with Gareth Roberts. The most notable of the contributions were The One Doctor (2001) and Bang-Bang-a-Boom! (2002). Also with Roberts he co-wrote From Raxacoricofallapatorius with Love, the 2009 Comic Relief mini-episode of The Sarah Jane Adventures. The following year, both Hickman and Roberts were given a full script commission. This commission eventually became Goodbye, Sarah Jane Smith the two-part finale to the fourth season, transmitted on 15 and 16 November 2010. A further collaboration between Hickman and Roberts for the fifth season of The Sarah Jane Adventures had reached script stage when news of Elisabeth Sladen's illness reached the production team and work was halted.

Hickman was one of the writers for the first series of Russell T Davies' 2012 CBBC drama Wizards vs Aliens. This was his first solo TV writing credit.

== Television work ==
On TV, Hickman was one of the judges for the "Companion Academy" segment of the BBC children's show Totally Doctor Who during its first run in 2006. He also appeared as a commentator for over 15 episodes across the first two series of the BBC Three show Doctor Who Confidential. Other media work related to Doctor Who includes two appearances on Channel 4's Richard & Judy, one on Radio 4's Today, one appearance on a never-ending loop for 50 Ways to Leave Your TV Lover on Sky, and a 1986 appearance on the first ever Really Wild Show where he got to look at some poisonous tree frogs with Terry Nutkins.

== DVD work ==
Since 2002, Hickman has been the regular cover artist for BBC Worldwide/2 entertain Ltd's DVD releases of classic Doctor Who stories. He participated in a fan commentary on the DVD release of Survival and moderated the DVD commentaries for The Time Meddler, The Keys of Marinus and Frontier in Space. For the DVD release of The Masque of Mandragora Clayton Hickman and Gareth Roberts provided a sketch titled "Beneath the Masque of the Mask of Mandragora". He has also appeared as a 'talking head' on more than ten Doctor Who DVD Special Features.

== Design work ==
As a designer, Hickman contributed many of the early covers to Big Finish Productions' audio and book ranges. In 2003, he designed the BBC's official 40th Anniversary Doctor Who logo. In 2010, Hickman collaborated on a range of 1980s-themed Doctor Who merchandise designs for BBC Worldwide. He was the designer of Russell T Davies' 2008 book The Writer's Tale and its greatly expanded paperback update, published a year later.

In January 2009, Hickman had the honour of designing the very first "iconic image" of Matt Smith and the TARDIS with extreme secrecy. The image was released to the press the next day, accompanying the announcement that Smith would be playing the Eleventh Doctor.

Hickman designed the DVD covers for Russell T Davies' BBC children's dramas Dark Season and Century Falls, as well design work for Mark Gatiss' novel The Devil in Amber He also designed the DVD covers for Gatiss' BBC Four dramas Crooked House and First Men in the Moon. Hickman was also a design consultant on the poster for the 2005 film The League of Gentlemen's Apocalypse and designed the programme cover of their 2006 stage show The League of Gentlemen Are Behind You. Other design work includes the DVD cover and booklet for the BBC's release of Adam Adamant Lives! and photo-manipulation work for the 2012 Sherlock episode "The Hounds of Baskerville".

== Other ==
In 2010-11 Hickman was an advisor to the design team behind the BBC's London Olympia-based The Doctor Who Experience. For the post-ride exhibition, he selected the archive images used for display and was the main copywriter for the project. Hickman was also script editor for the 2010 BBC graphic novel The Only Good Dalek by Justin Richards and Mike Collins. In conjunction with writer Gareth Roberts, Hickman also provided dialogue for both the 2010 Doctor Who Live stage production, and the Doctor Who-themed introduction to ITV1's 2011 NTA awards ceremony which featured Matt Smith.

Preceded by Alan Barnes	Doctor Who Magazine Editor; 2002–2007	Succeeded by Tom Spilsbury
