= TV Zone =

British cult TV magazine (1989–2008)

- Editor: Anthony Brown
- Categories: Science fiction
- Frequency: 4 weekly
- First issue: September 1989
- Final issue: December 2008
- Company: Visual Imagination
- Country: United Kingdom
- Based in: London
- Language: British English
- Website: visimag.com/tvzone
- ISSN: 0957-3844

TV Zone was a British magazine that was published every four weeks by Visual Imagination that covered cult television. Initially, it mostly covered science fiction, but branched out to cover other drama and comedy series.

== History ==
TV Zone was launched in September 1989 by publishers Visual Imagination as a spin-off of their existing title Starburst. Its original and longest serving editor was Jan Vincent-Rudzki and original tagline was "The Magazine of Cult Television" (later "The World's Longest-Running Cult Television Magazine").

Originally, the magazine concentrated solely on science fiction and fantasy television, but over time it broadened its interests to occasionally include comedy (mostly through articles by Andrew Pixley) and mainstream drama programmes such as The West Wing and Spooks. It also covered science fiction radio (mostly in its review section).

TV Zone's editors were, in order, Jan Vincent-Rudzki, Lee Binding, Tom Spilsbury and Anthony Brown.

Tom Spilsbury took over as editor from Jan Vincent-Rudzki in late 2000 and was responsible for issues 136–161, eventually leaving in April 2003 to work on Doctor Who Magazine.

The final edition was double numbered as issue 231/232, published in December 2008. The magazine ended when publishers Visual Imagination folded in early 2009, with the TV Zone name now being used by a website featuring TV programme news, previews and ratings, not connected to Visual Imagination.

== Content ==
TV Zone contained news, interviews, features and reviews of television (and audio) series and their related merchandise (such as novelisations).

It also contained selected UK TV listings; this section was used as the basis of its sister publication Cult Times.
