= Alan Barnes (writer) =

British writer and editor

- Areas: Writer, Editor
- Notable works: Judge Dredd; Doctor Who

Alan Barnes is a British writer and editor, mainly related to cult film and television.

== Biography ==
Barnes was the editor of Judge Dredd Megazine from 2002 until 2006. Among other strips, Barnes originally commissioned The Simping Detective. He also wrote a handful of Judge Dredd stories involving alternate universes or featuring a young Dredd.

He worked for five years at Doctor Who Magazine and progressed from writing strips to becoming joint editor in 1998 and sole editor from 2000 until 2002. He subsequently contributed the ongoing Fact of Fiction series of articles to the magazine.

Barnes has written or co-written a number of Doctor Who audio plays for Big Finish Productions.

He has written a number of books on films, including James Bond, Quentin Tarantino and Sherlock Holmes, and his book The Hammer Story, co-written with Marcus Hearn, was nominated for the Bram Stoker Award for Best Non-Fiction in 1997.

== Bibliography ==
=== Comics and magazines ===
- Judge Dredd:
  - "Tickers" (with Maya Gavin, in Judge Dredd Megazine 3.14, 1996)
  - "Medusa" (with Paul Peart and Roger Langridge, in Judge Dredd Lawman of the Future #19-20, 1996)
  - "Dredd of Drokk Green" (with Trevor Hairsine, in Judge Dredd Mega Special 1996)
- Doctor Who:
  - "The Cybermen: The Hungry Sea" (with Adrian Salmon, in Doctor Who Magazine #227-229)
  - "The Cybermen: The Dark Flame" (with Adrian Salmon, in Doctor Who Magazine #230-233)
  - End Game (212 pages, ISBN 1-905239-09-2) collects:
    - "End Game" (with Martin Geraghty, in Doctor Who Magazine #244-247)
    - "The Keep" (with Martin Geraghty, in Doctor Who Magazine #248-249)
    - "A Life of Matter & Death" (with Sean Longcroft, in Doctor Who Magazine #250)
    - "Fire and Brimstone" (with Martin Geraghty, #251-255)
    - "Tooth and Claw" (with Martin Geraghty, in Doctor Who Magazine #257-260)
    - "The Final Chapter" (with Martin Geraghty, in Doctor Who Magazine #262-265)
  - The Glorious Dead (244 pages, 2006, ISBN 1-905239-44-0) collects:
    - "The Road to Hell" (with Martin Geraghty, in Doctor Who Magazine #278-282)
    - "TV Action!" (with Roger Langridge, in Doctor Who Magazine #283)
  - "The Warkeeper's Crown" (with Martin Geraghty, in Doctor Who Magazine #378-380)
  - "Liberation of the Daleks" in Doctor Who Magazine (#584-597)

=== Audio plays ===
Audio plays include:

- Storm Warning
- Neverland
- Zagreus (with Gary Russell)
- The Next Life (with Gary Russell)
- The Girl Who Never Was
- Gallifrey: Weapon of Choice
- Gallifrey: A Blind Eye
- Gallifrey: Panacea
- Brotherhood of the Daleks
- Izzy's Story
- Castle of Fear
- Orbis (with Nicholas Briggs)
- Death in Blackpool
- Nevermore
- Jago and Litefoot: The Bellova Devil
- Heroes of Sontar
- Trail of the White Worm
- The Oseidon Adventure
- Destiny of the Doctor: Enemy Aliens
- Gods and Monsters (with Mike Maddox)
- Daleks Among Us
- Trial of the Valeyard (with Mike Maddox)
- White Ghosts
- Dark Eyes 2: The White Room
- Last of the Cybermen
- Suburban Hell
- The Red House
- The Churchill Years: Hounded
- And You Will Obey Me
- Gallery of Ghouls

He also wrote the animated serial, The Infinite Quest.

=== Books ===
Books include:

- The Hammer Story (with Marcus Hearn, originally published 1997, Titan Books, 1999 ISBN 1-84576-185-5)
- Kiss Kiss Bang! Bang!: The Unofficial James Bond Film Companion (with Marcus Hearn, Overlook Press, 1998 ISBN 0-87951-874-X)
- Tarantino A to Zed (with Marcus Hearn, B.T. Batsford Ltd, 1999 ISBN 0-7134-8457-8)
- Sherlock Holmes on Screen (originally published 1999, Reynolds & Hearn Ltd, 2004 ISBN 1-903111-78-1), Third Edition published 31 January 2012 by Titan Books, ISBN 978-0-85768-776-0

Preceded by David Bishop	Judge Dredd Megazine editor 2002–2006	Succeeded by Matt Smith
Preceded by Gary Gillatt	Doctor Who Magazine editor 2000–2001	Succeeded by Clayton Hickman
