= Shivers (magazine) =

- Issue #1 cover
- Editor: Jan Vincent-Rudzki (Deputy Group Editor)
- Categories: Horror
- Frequency: 8 issues a year
- First issue: June 1992
- Final issue Number: May 2008; 138
- Company: Visual Imagination
- Country: United Kingdom
- Website: Official site
- ISSN: 0965-8238
- OCLC: 1064174372

Shivers was a U.K.-based magazine published between 1992 and 2008. It was dedicated to horror movies, literature and occasionally, video games.

== History ==
The publication took its name from the 1975 film of the same name by David Cronenberg. It was published by Visual Imagination, and its inaugural issue appeared in June 1992. The first 12 issues were edited by Alan Jones and the next 120 by David Miller. After David Miller left the company, the final half-dozen contained no editor credit. The last issue (number 138) was published on 14 May 2008.

The magazine's regular features for much of its run included a news section written by Jones, an item called The Pitt of Horror by Ingrid Pitt, a book review section by David J. Howe, an opinion column by Kim Newman and an end-of-magazine film analysis called The Fright of Your Life originated by Cleaver Patterson and continued by Jonathan Rigby. Critic Alex Wylie was also a contributor.
