= Vanessa Bishop =

British writer

Vanessa Bishop (fl. 1990s) is a British writer who writes in the review section "Off the Shelf" in Doctor Who Magazine. She has also written short stories based on the BBC Television series Doctor Who.

== Work ==
Bishop first made her name with factual writing for various Doctor Who fanzines. Then, in 1992, Marvel UK's Doctor Who Magazine published her short story A Visit to the Cinema in their "Brief Encounters" section, as well as publishing another story (Playtime) in their 1992 Yearbook. Following this, Virgin Publishing published two of her stories in volumes of their Doctor Who short story anthologies, Decalog. She has also had a short story published in one of Big Finish Productions' Short Trips collections.

Bishop is also rumoured to have written a regular column for Doctor Who Magazine in the late 1990s, as the fictional female fan "Jackie Jenkins".

Vanessa Bishop took over the reviewing section of Doctor Who Magazine following the previous incumbent Dave Owen's departure, although Owen later returned to the column to review some items Bishop did not have time to cover, due to the extensive expansion in the amount of spin-off merchandise being produced.
