= Marek Kukula =

British astronomer (born 1969)

Marek Janusz Kukula (born 1969) is a British astronomer and an author of works on popular science. After gaining a PhD in radio astronomy from the University of Manchester in 1994, he specialised in studying distant galaxies. As his research reached the limits of telescopes, he moved into the field of public engagement. In 2008 he was appointed Public Astronomer at the Royal Observatory Greenwich.

== Early life and education ==
Kukula credits his father as the person who "first ignited and then encouraged my interest in the natural world", and a trip with his parents to the Jodrell Bank Observatory at age 14 for his decision to focus on astronomy.

He graduated in physics with astrophysics from the University of Manchester in 1990 and in 1994 was awarded a PhD in radio astronomy from the same university with a thesis on The radio properties of Seyfert nuclei, based on research carried out at Jodrell Bank Observatory.

== Career ==
=== Research ===
Kukula's field is distant galaxies.

After completing his PhD, Kukula subsequently worked as a postdoctoral research assistant at Liverpool John Moores University, the University of Edinburgh's Institute for Astronomy (based at the Royal Observatory Edinburgh) and the Space Telescope Science Institute in Baltimore. This was followed by a PPARC Advanced Fellowship held at the University of Edinburgh.

His research interests include active galactic nuclei (particularly Seyfert galaxy, Radio galaxy and quasars) and the ways in which large galaxies and their central supermassive black holes have changed and evolved throughout cosmological time. This research has involved the use of a variety of telescopes, including the Hubble Space Telescope, the Very Large Array, MERLIN, the William Herschel Telescope, and the Very Large Telescope.

=== Public engagement ===
Kukula's interest in public engagement work was sparked when he enjoyed doing these activities in addition to his main role as a postdoctoral researcher at the University of Edinburgh.

As his work began to reach the limits of what was achievable with Hubble and the VLT, Kukula decided to move away from research, and instead explore the possibility of pursuing a career in the developing field of outreach.

After his Fellowship, Kukula was appointed Course Organiser for Science and Nature in the University of Edinburgh's Office of Lifelong Learning, delivering a programme of science course for the general public.

Kukula worked with the Researchers in Residence programme.

Kukula was a member of the Science and Technology Facilities Council's Small Awards funding panel for public engagement in astronomy, particle and nuclear physics.

In August 2008 he was appointed to the new post of Public Astronomer at the Royal Observatory Greenwich where his role was to engage the UK public and media with all aspects of astronomy, astrophysics, cosmology and planetary science. The role included provision for a return to performing his own research, but Kukula initially doubt he would take this up, due to the time and enjoyment he got out of effectively researching a much larger body of science than just his research area.

In 2013, in his role as Public Astronomer he curated the Visions of the Universe temporary exhibition at the National Maritime Museum. Having attracted 72,000 visitors and been given a five star review by The Guardian's art critic, Marek credited this as his greatest achievement so far, in a 2016 interview with The Guardian.

=== Popular science ===
In 2015 he co-authored The Scientific Secrets of Doctor Who with Simon Guerrier, and described it as " a book which used Doctor Who to explore science in the real world".

From 2015 to 2017, Kukula reviewed science books for The Spectator.

== Awards and honours ==
In 2017 he was the first recipient of the Royal Astronomical Society's Annie Maunder Medal for Outreach.

== Selected publications ==
- Guerrier, Simon; Kukula, Marek (2015). The scientific secrets of Doctor Who. London: Ebury Press. ISBN 9781849909389.
- Kukula, Marek (2015). The intimate universe: how the stars are closer than you think. London: Quercus. ISBN 978-1782067894.
