= Scott Gray (writer) =

New Zealand writer

- Born: Warwick Gray
- Areas: Writer, artist
- Pseudonym: W. Scott Gray
- Notable works: Doctor Who, X-Men: First Class

Scott Gray is a comic book writer from New Zealand who lives and works in the UK.

== Biography ==
Gray began his career writing and illustrating comic stories for Razor Magazine, Time Space Visualiser and Timestreams using his given name of Warwick Gray whilst living in Dunedin, New Zealand. In 1991 he sold a story to Doctor Who Magazine, prompting him to move to work in the UK.

He became Doctor Who Magazine's assistant editor and was the titles regular comic strip writer between 1998 and 2004, covering most of the Eighth Doctor's stories. In 1995 he adopted the pen-name Scott Gray.

Gray is the writer on Uncanny X-Men: First Class, and also edits the Marvel Collectors' Edition line of magazines and has worked with artist Roger Langridge on the Marvel comic team the Fin Fang Four.
