= Visual Imagination =

British magazine publisher

Visual Imagination Ltd.
- Industry: Publishing
- Founded: 1985; 41 years ago
- Founder: Stephen Payne
- Defunct: 2009
- Headquarters: United Kingdom

Visual Imagination Ltd. was a British company that produced genre magazines. It was founded in 1985 by Stephen Payne and originally only published the science-fiction magazine Fantasy Image.

After Payne bought the magazine Starburst from Marvel UK, its list of titles expanded to include:

- Cult Times
- Film Review
- Movie Idols
- Shivers
- Space Junkk
- TV Zone
- Ultimate DVD
- The Works
- XPosé

It also published translated editions of some of the above in France and Germany. The company was disestablished in early 2009.
