= Flannan (disambiguation) =

Flannan may refer to:

- Flannán mac Toirrdelbaig, saint and patron of Killaloe
- Flannan Isles, a small island group in the Outer Hebrides of Scotland
- Flannan Isles Lighthouse, lighthouse on Eilean Mòr, one of the Flannan Isles
- St Flannan's College, Irish secondary school
- Flannan Isle, poem by Wilfrid Wilson Gibson
