= Flannan Isles Lighthouse =

Lighthouse off the northwest coast of Scotland

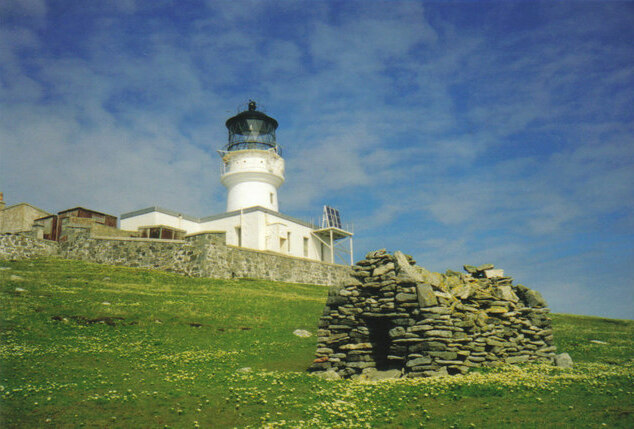
- The Chapel of St. Flannan can be seen on the slope to the right of the lighthouse on Eilean Mòr.
- Location: Eilean Mòr; 32 kilometres (20 mi) west of Lewis; Western Isles; Scotland
- OS grid: NA7266746884
- Coordinates: 58°17′17″N 07°35′17″W

Tower
- Constructed: 1899; 127 years ago
- Designed by: David Alan Stevenson
- Construction: masonry tower
- Automated: 1971; 55 years ago
- Height: 23 metres (75 ft)
- Shape: cylindrical tower with balcony and lantern attached to 1-storey keeper's house
- Markings: White tower, black lantern, ochre trim
- Operator: Northern Lighthouse Board
- Heritage: category B listed building
- Racon: MMSI No : 992351080

Light
- First lit: 7 December 1899; 126 years ago
- Focal height: 101 metres (331 ft)
- Lens: 3rd order clamshell Fresnel lens
- Light source: Electric Rotating Solar Powered Metal Halide Optic
- Range: 20 nautical miles (37 km; 23 mi)
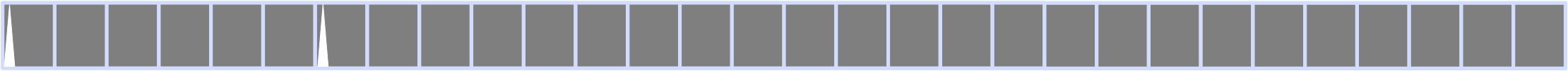
- Characteristic: Fl(2) W30s 101m 20M (Fl.0.2s-ec.5.8s, Fl.0.2s-ec 23.8s)

Flannan Isles Lighthouse is a lighthouse near the highest point on Eilean Mòr, one of the Flannan Isles in the Outer Hebrides off the west coast of Scotland. In 1900, its three keepers disappeared under mysterious circumstances.

== History ==
The 23-metre (75 ft) lighthouse was designed by David Alan Stevenson for the Northern Lighthouse Board (NLB). Construction, between 1895 and 1899, was undertaken by George Lawson of Rutherglen at a cost of £1,899 (equivalent to £216,000 in 2025) inclusive of the building, landing places, stairs, and railway tracks. All of the materials used had to be hauled up the 45-metre (148 ft) cliffs directly from supply boats. A further £3,526 (£401,000 in 2025) was spent on the shore station at Breasclete on the Isle of Lewis. The lighthouse was first lit on 7 December 1899.

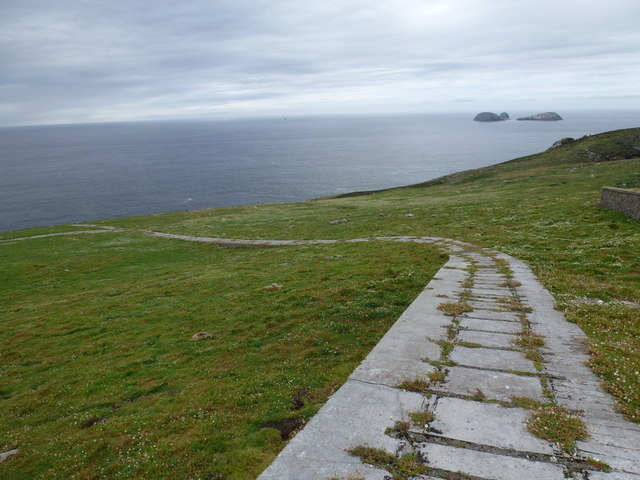
The remains of the lighthouse railway in 2012. The "Clapham Junction" fork is visible at left middle.

A cable-hauled railway was built to facilitate the transport of provisions up the steep gradients from the landing places. At that time, the light consumed twenty barrels of paraffin a year. The cable was powered by a small steam engine in a shed adjoining the lighthouse. The rail line descended from the lighthouse in a westerly direction and then curved round to the south. In the approximate centre of the island it forked by means of a set of hand-operated points dubbed "Clapham Junction", in reference to a railway junction in London; one branch continued in its curvature to head eastwards to the east landing place, on the south-east corner of the island, thus forming a half-circle, while the other, slightly shorter, branch curved back to the west to serve the west landing, situated in a small inlet on the island's south coast. The final approaches to the landing stages were extremely steep. The cable was guided round the curves by pulleys set between the rails, and a line of posts set outside the inner rail prevented it from going too far astray should it jump off the pulleys. The cargo was carried in a small four-wheeled bogie.

In 1925, the lighthouse became one of the first Scottish lights to receive communications from the shore by wireless telegraphy. In the 1960s, the island's transport system was modernised. The railway was removed, leaving behind the concrete bed on which it had been laid to serve as a roadway for a "Gnat" – a three-wheeled, rubber-tyred cross-country vehicle powered by a 400-cubic-centimetre (24 cu in) four-stroke engine, built by Aimers McLean of Galashiels. This had a somewhat shorter working life than the railway, becoming redundant in its turn when the helipad was constructed.

On 28 September 1971, the lighthouse was automated. A reinforced concrete helipad was constructed at the same time to enable maintenance visits in heavy weather. The light is produced by burning acetylene gas and has a range of 17 nautical miles (20 mi; 31 km). It is now monitored from the Butt of Lewis and the shore station has been converted into flats.

In December 2025, Western Isles Council gave planning permission for the renovation and development of the shore station, which is a Grade B listed building. The plans involved creating exhibition space and offices on the ground floor, and two self-catering holiday flats on the first floor, with an additional self-catering unit in an adjacent building.

== 1900 crew disappearance ==
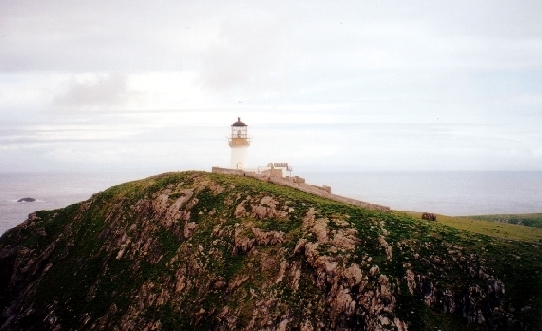
Flannan Isles Lighthouse

The first record that something was abnormal on the Flannan Isles was on 15 December 1900 when the steamer Archtor, on a passage from Philadelphia to Leith, noted in its log that the light was not operational in poor weather conditions. When the ship docked in Leith on 18 December 1900, the sighting was passed on to the Northern Lighthouse Board. The relief vessel, the lighthouse tender Hesperus, was unable to sail from Breasclete, Lewis, as planned on 20 December due to adverse weather; she did not reach the island until noon on 26 December. The lighthouse was manned by three men: James Ducat, Thomas Marshall and Donald McArthur, with a rotating fourth man spending time on shore.

On arrival, the crew of Hesperus and the relief keeper found that the flagpole had no flag, none of the usual provision boxes had been left on the landing stage for restocking and none of the lighthouse keepers were there to welcome them ashore. Jim Harvie, the captain of Hesperus, attempted to reach them by blowing the ship's whistle and firing a flare but was unsuccessful.

A boat was launched and Joseph Moore, the relief keeper, was put ashore alone. He found the entrance gate to the compound and the main door both closed, the beds unmade and the clock unwound. Returning to the landing stage with this news, he then went back up to the lighthouse with Hesperus's second mate and a seaman. A further search revealed that the lamps had been cleaned and refilled. A set of oilskins was found, suggesting that one of the keepers had left the lighthouse without them. There was no sign of any of the keepers, neither inside the lighthouse nor anywhere on the island.

Moore and three volunteer seamen were left on the island to attend the light and Hesperus returned to Lewis. Captain Harvie sent a telegram to the Northern Lighthouse Board dated 26 December 1900, stating:

A dreadful accident has happened at the Flannans. The three keepers, Ducat, Marshall and the Occasional have disappeared from the Island... The clocks were stopped and other signs indicated that the accident must have happened about a week ago. Poor fellows they must have been blown over the cliffs or drowned trying to secure a crane.

On Eilean Mòr the men scoured every corner of the island for clues as to the fate of the keepers. They found that everything was intact at the east landing but the west landing provided considerable evidence of damage caused by recent storms. A box at 33 metres (108 ft) above sea level had been broken and its contents strewn about; iron railings were bent over, the iron railway by the path was wrenched out of its concrete and a rock weighing more than a ton had been displaced. On top of the cliff, at more than 60 metres (200 ft) above sea level, turf had been ripped away as far as 10 metres (33 ft) from the cliff edge.

=== Northern Lighthouse Board investigation ===
On 29 December 1900 Robert Muirhead, a Northern Lighthouse Board (NLB) superintendent, arrived to conduct the official investigation into the incident. Muirhead had originally recruited all three of the missing men and knew them personally.

He examined the clothing left behind in the lighthouse and concluded that Ducat and Marshall had gone down to the western landing stage and that McArthur (the 'Occasional') had left the lighthouse during heavy rain in his shirt sleeves. He noted that whoever left the light last and unattended was in breach of NLB rules. He also noted that some of the damage to the west landing was "difficult to believe unless actually seen".

From evidence which I was able to procure I was satisfied that the men had been on duty up till dinner time on Saturday the 15th of December, that they had gone down to secure a box in which the mooring ropes, landing ropes etc. were kept, and which was secured in a crevice in the rock about 110 feet [34 metres] above sea level, and that an extra large sea had rushed up the face of the rock, had gone above them, and coming down with immense force, had swept them completely away.

Ducat left a wife and four children; McArthur a wife and two children. The disappearances tarnished the lighthouse's reputation for many years after the incident.

=== Speculation and conjecture ===
No bodies were ever found, but there have been some mysterious sights resulting in "fascinated national speculation" in newspapers and periodicals of the era. Implausible stories ensued, such as that a sea serpent had carried the men away; that they had arranged for a ship to take them away and start new lives; that they had been abducted by foreign spies; or that they had met their fate through the malevolent presence of a boat filled with ghosts (the baleful influence of the "Phantom of the Seven Hunters" was widely suspected locally). More than ten years later the events were still being commemorated and elaborated on. The 1912 ballad "Flannan Isle" by Wilfrid Wilson Gibson refers erroneously to an overturned chair and uneaten meal laid out on the table, indicating that the keepers had been suddenly disturbed.

Yet, as we crowded through the door,
We only saw a table spread
For dinner, meat, and cheese and bread;
But, all untouch'd; and no-one there,
As though, when they sat down to eat,
Ere they could even taste,
Alarm had come, and they in haste
Had risen and left the bread and meat,
For at the table head a chair
Lay tumbled on the floor.

However, in a first-hand account made by Moore, the relief keeper, he stated that: "The kitchen utensils were all very clean, which is a sign that it must be after dinner some time they left."

=== Later theories and interpretations ===
Over time a story has developed of the existence of unusual log book entries. They supposedly have Marshall saying on 12 December that there were "severe winds the likes of which I have never seen before in twenty years". He also is said to have reported that Ducat had been "very quiet" and Donald McArthur had been crying. McArthur was a veteran mariner with a reputation for brawling, and thus it would be strange for him to be crying in response to a storm. Log entries on 13 December were said to have stated that the storm was still raging and that all three men had been praying. This was also puzzling, as all three men were experienced lighthouse keepers who knew they were in a secure structure 150 feet above sea level and should have known they were safe inside. Furthermore, there had been no reported storms in the area on the 12, 13 and 14 December. The final log entry is said to have been made on 15 December, stating "Storm ended, sea calm. God is over all." However, an investigation by Mike Dash for the Fortean Times revealed that the logbooks were fictional, later additions to the story.

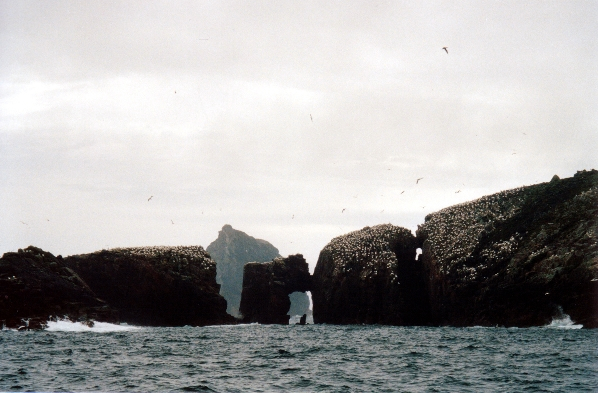
The westernmost of the Flannan Isles: Eilean a' Ghobha and Roareim with Brona Cleit in the distance

Subsequent researchers have taken into account the geography of the islands. The coastline of Eilean Mòr is deeply indented with narrow gullies called geos. The west landing, which is situated in such a geo, terminates in a cave. In high seas or storms water would rush into the cave and then explode out again with considerable force. It was possible McArthur saw a series of large waves approaching the island and, knowing the likely danger to his colleagues, ran down to warn them only to be washed away as well in the violent swell. Recent research by James Love discovered that Marshall was previously fined five shillings when his equipment was washed away during a huge gale. It is likely, in seeking to avoid another fine, that he and Ducat tried to secure their equipment during a storm and were swept away as a result. The fate of McArthur, although he had been required to stay behind to man the lighthouse, can be guessed to be the same. Love speculates that McArthur probably tried to warn or help his colleagues and was swept away too. This theory also has the advantage of explaining the set of oilskins remaining indoors and McArthur's coat remaining on its peg, although perhaps not the closed door and gate. Another theory is based on the first-hand experiences of Walter Aldebert, a keeper on the Flannans from 1953 to 1957. He believed one man may have been washed into the sea but then his companions, who were trying to rescue him, were washed away by more rogue waves.

A further proposal is based on the psychology of the keepers. Allegedly, McArthur was a volatile character; this may have led to a fight breaking out near the cliff edge by the West Landing that caused all three men to fall to their deaths.

== In popular culture ==
- Wilfrid Wilson Gibson's (1878–1962) poem "Flannan Isle" recounts the horror of the search party who find an empty lighthouse with no trace of "three men dead".
- British rock group Genesis wrote and recorded "The Mystery of the Flannan Isle Lighthouse" in 1968. It was released in 1998 on Genesis Archive 1967–75.
- Fictional use of this premise was featured in the Doctor Who serial Horror of Fang Rock.
- The mystery was inspiration for Peter Maxwell Davies's 1979 chamber opera The Lighthouse.
- The 2018 film The Vanishing is based on the event.
- The season 7 premiere of BuzzFeed Unsolved True Crime on 21 October 2020 covers the disappearance.
- The Flannan Isles and the Lighthouse are featured in the 2021 Mark Dawson book Never Let Me Down Again.
- The disappearance initiates the events of Natasha Pulley's 2021 novel The Kingdoms.
- The video game Dark Fall II: Lights Out was partially inspired by this occurrence, and references both the Doctor Who episode and the Gibson poem listed above.
- The video game Reverse: 1999 includes the Flannan Isles as a side story.
- Emma Stonex's book The Lamplighters is based on the events at the lighthouse.

== See also ==
- List of people who disappeared mysteriously (pre-1910)
- Mary Celeste, a ship whose crew disappeared entirely, leading to similar theorizing about the cause.
