= Doctor Who season 11 =

1973–74 season of British sci-fi TV series

Doctor Who
- Season 11
- Cover art of the Region 2 DVD release for the first serial of the season
- Starring: Jon Pertwee; Elisabeth Sladen; Nicholas Courtney; John Levene; Richard Franklin
- No. of stories: 5
- No. of episodes: 26

Release
- Original network: BBC1
- Original release: 15 December 1973 – 8 June 1974

Season chronology
- ← Previous; Season 10 Next → Season 12

The eleventh season of British science fiction television series Doctor Who began on 15 December 1973 with the serial The Time Warrior, and ended with Jon Pertwee's final serial Planet of the Spiders. The season's writing was recognized by the Writer's Guild of Great Britain for Best Children's Drama Script. This is the Third Doctor's fifth and final series, and also the last consecutively to be produced by Barry Letts and script edited by Terrance Dicks. Both Letts and Dicks would work for the programme again, however – Letts in Season 18 and Dicks on future stories, e.g. Horror of Fang Rock.

== Casting ==
=== Main cast ===
- Jon Pertwee as the Third Doctor
- Elisabeth Sladen as Sarah Jane Smith

Jon Pertwee makes his final appearance as the series lead in Planet of the Spiders, although he would reprise the role of the Third Doctor in the 20th anniversary special episode, "The Five Doctors". Elisabeth Sladen makes her first appearance as Sarah Jane Smith in The Time Warrior. Tom Baker makes his first uncredited appearance as the Fourth Doctor in Part 6 of Planet of the Spiders, when Jon Pertwee's Doctor is fatally wounded and regenerates into the Fourth Doctor.

=== Recurring cast ===
- Nicholas Courtney as Brigadier Lethbridge-Stewart
- John Levene as Sergeant Benton
- Richard Franklin as Mike Yates

Nicholas Courtney and John Levene continue their roles of Brigadier Lethbridge-Stewart and Sergeant Benton, while Richard Franklin makes his final regular appearance as Captain Yates in Planet of the Spiders

=== Guest stars ===
Alan Bennion makes his third and final appearance in the series as an Ice Warrior, portraying Lord Azaxyr in The Monster of Peladon. June Brown played Lady Eleanor in The Time Warrior.

== Development ==
Two serials were scrapped from this season. The first, The Automata, was to be written by Robert Holmes, though was ultimately scrapped in favor of The Time Warrior. The Third Doctor's final story was initially to be called The Final Game, by Robert Sloman and Barry Letts as uncredited co-writer. The story would have revealed that the Master and the Doctor were brothers, or opposing aspects of the same being (the ego and the id), and the Master dying in a manner suggesting that he sacrificed himself to save the Doctor's life. However, due to Roger Delgado (who played the Master) dying in a car accident in Turkey on 18 June 1973, and the story was scrapped and replaced by Planet of the Spiders.

== Serials ==
This season was the last to have Barry Letts as producer and Terrance Dicks as script editor, ending the relationship that had gone through the whole of Jon Pertwee's tenure as the Doctor. It saw the introduction of a new logo that would be used nearly throughout the Fourth Doctor's era, as well as the new companion Sarah Jane Smith and the alien race, the Sontarans.

No. story	No. in season	Serial title	Episode titles	Directed by	Written by	Original release date	Prod. code	UK viewers (millions)	AI
70	1	The Time Warrior	"Part One"	Alan Bromly	Robert Holmes	15 December 1973	UUU	8.7	59
70	1	The Time Warrior	"Part Two"	Alan Bromly	Robert Holmes	22 December 1973	UUU	7.0	—
70	1	The Time Warrior	"Part Three"	Alan Bromly	Robert Holmes	29 December 1973	UUU	6.6	—
70	1	The Time Warrior	"Part Four"	Alan Bromly	Robert Holmes	5 January 1974	UUU	10.6	60
In the Middle Ages, a rabble of criminals find the crashed spaceship of a Sontaran warrior. Meanwhile, in the 1970s, the Third Doctor is investigating the disappearance of several scientists from a top secret research complex.
71	2	Invasion of the Dinosaurs	"Part One"	Paddy Russell	Malcolm Hulke	12 January 1974	WWW	11.0	62
71	2	Invasion of the Dinosaurs	"Part Two"	Paddy Russell	Malcolm Hulke	19 January 1974	WWW	10.1	—
71	2	Invasion of the Dinosaurs	"Part Three"	Paddy Russell	Malcolm Hulke	26 January 1974	WWW	11.0	63
71	2	Invasion of the Dinosaurs	"Part Four"	Paddy Russell	Malcolm Hulke	2 February 1974	WWW	9.0	—
71	2	Invasion of the Dinosaurs	"Part Five"	Paddy Russell	Malcolm Hulke	9 February 1974	WWW	9.0	—
71	2	Invasion of the Dinosaurs	"Part Six"	Paddy Russell	Malcolm Hulke	16 February 1974	WWW	7.5	62
The Doctor and Sarah Jane arrive in 1970s London to find that it has been evacuated due to the mysterious appearance of dinosaurs.
72	3	Death to the Daleks	"Part One"	Michael E. Briant	Terry Nation	23 February 1974	XXX	8.1	61
72	3	Death to the Daleks	"Part Two"	Michael E. Briant	Terry Nation	2 March 1974	XXX	9.5	—
72	3	Death to the Daleks	"Part Three"	Michael E. Briant	Terry Nation	9 March 1974	XXX	10.5	61
72	3	Death to the Daleks	"Part Four"	Michael E. Briant	Terry Nation	16 March 1974	XXX	9.5	62
Travelling through space, the TARDIS suffers an energy drain and crash-lands on the planet Exxilon.
73	4	The Monster of Peladon	"Part One"	Lennie Mayne	Brian Hayles	23 March 1974	YYY	9.2	—
73	4	The Monster of Peladon	"Part Two"	Lennie Mayne	Brian Hayles	30 March 1974	YYY	6.8	—
73	4	The Monster of Peladon	"Part Three"	Lennie Mayne	Brian Hayles	6 April 1974	YYY	7.4	64
73	4	The Monster of Peladon	"Part Four"	Lennie Mayne	Brian Hayles	13 April 1974	YYY	7.2	—
73	4	The Monster of Peladon	"Part Five"	Lennie Mayne	Brian Hayles	20 April 1974	YYY	7.5	—
73	4	The Monster of Peladon	"Part Six"	Lennie Mayne	Brian Hayles	27 April 1974	YYY	8.1	—
The Doctor returns to Peladon, which has been taken over by some Ice Warriors.
74	5	Planet of the Spiders	"Part One"	Barry Letts	Robert Sloman and Barry Letts (uncredited)	4 May 1974	ZZZ	10.1	58
74	5	Planet of the Spiders	"Part Two"	Barry Letts	Robert Sloman and Barry Letts (uncredited)	11 May 1974	ZZZ	8.9	60
74	5	Planet of the Spiders	"Part Three"	Barry Letts	Robert Sloman and Barry Letts (uncredited)	18 May 1974	ZZZ	8.8	57
74	5	Planet of the Spiders	"Part Four"	Barry Letts	Robert Sloman and Barry Letts (uncredited)	25 May 1974	ZZZ	8.2	—
74	5	Planet of the Spiders	"Part Five"	Barry Letts	Robert Sloman and Barry Letts (uncredited)	1 June 1974	ZZZ	9.2	—
74	5	Planet of the Spiders	"Part Six"	Barry Letts	Robert Sloman and Barry Letts (uncredited)	8 June 1974	ZZZ	8.9	56
A giant spider from the planet Metebelis Three is summoned to an English meditation retreat by an out-of-work salesman.

== Broadcast ==
Episode One of The Time Warrior saw the first appearance of the familiar diamond-shaped Doctor Who logo. This would be used throughout the Third Doctor's final season and almost through the Fourth Doctor's tenure before retiring in part four of The Horns of Nimon (not including the unbroadcast and incomplete serial Shada which would have followed The Horns of Nimon).

The entire season was broadcast from 15 December 1973 to 8 June 1974.

Season 11 of Doctor Who on BBC1 Wales had very different broadcasts compared to the rest of the UK. Only Part One of The Time Warrior aired on the same day as in the rest of the UK, on Saturday 15 December 1973. On BBC1 Wales, Part Two aired on Monday 24 December 1973, Part Three aired on Tuesday 1 January 1974, and Part Four aired on Tuesday 8 January 1974. Part One of Invasion of the Dinosaurs aired on Tuesday 15 January 1974, and Part Two aired on Sunday 20 January 1974. From then on, Season 11 broadcasts of Doctor Who episodes on BBC1 Wales remained in the Sunday slot, airing one day after the rest of the UK, finishing with Part Six of Planet of the Spiders that aired on Sunday 9 June 1974 on BBC1 Wales.

This change of broadcast on BBC1 Wales away from Saturdays for Season 11 of Doctor Who was due to a singing talent show called Gwerin 74 airing in the regular Saturday slot. Like the first 10 seasons, Doctor Who was back in the Saturday slot on BBC1 Wales for Season 12.

== Home media ==
=== VHS releases ===
Season	Story no.	Serial name	Duration	Release date		
Season	Story no.	Serial name	Duration	UK	Australia	USA / Canada
11	70	The Time Warrior	1 × 100 min.	June 1989	March 1989	April 1991
11	71	Invasion of the Dinosaurs	6 × 25 min.	October 2003	February 2004	October 2003
11	72	Death to the Daleks	1 × 100 min.	July 1987	December 1987	March 1990
11	72	Death to the Daleks	4 × 25 min.	February 1995	—N/a	—N/a
11	73	The Monster of Peladon	6 × 25 min.	January 1996 (2 × VHS)	May 1997	May 1997 (2 × VHS)
11	74	Planet of the Spiders	6 × 25 min.	April 1991 (2 × VHS)	September 1991	May 1994

=== DVD and Blu-ray releases ===
All releases are for DVD

Season	Story no.	Serial name	Duration	Release date		
Season	Story no.	Serial name	Duration	R2	R4	R1
11	70	The Time Warrior (Note: Available individually or in the Bred for War box set in Regions 2 and 4. Only available individually in Region 1.)	4 × 25 min.	3 September 2007	3 October 2007	1 April 2008
11	71	Invasion of the Dinosaurs (Note: Only available as part of the U.N.I.T. Files box set in Regions 2 and 4. Only available individually in Region 1.)	6 × 25 min.	9 January 2012	5 January 2012	10 January 2012
11	72	Death to the Daleks	4 × 25 min.	18 June 2012	5 July 2012	10 July 2012
11	73	The Monster of Peladon (Note: Only available as part of the Peladon Tales box set in Regions 2 and 4. Only available individually in Region 1.)	6 × 25 min.	18 January 2010	4 March 2010	4 May 2010
11	74	Planet of the Spiders (Note: Available individually or in the Regeneration box set in Region 2. Only available individually in Regions 1 and 4.)	6 × 25 min.	18 April 2011	2 June 2011	10 May 2011

== In print ==
Season	Story no.	Library no. (Note: Number in Target's Doctor Who Library, if applicable)	Novelisation title	Author	Hardcover release date (Note: Published by Target's parent companies (Allen Wingate, W. H. Allen, BBC Books) unless otherwise indicated)	Paperback release date (Note: Published by Target Books (or by BBC Books under the Target Collection umbrella) unless otherwise indicated)	Audiobook	
Season	Story no.	Library no.	Novelisation title	Author	Hardcover release date	Paperback release date	Release date (Note: Unabridged from BBC Audio / AudioGo unless otherwise indicated)	Narrator
11	070	65	Doctor Who and the Time Warrior	Terrance Dicks (Note: Prologue by Robert Holmes (uncredited))	18 May 1978	29 June 1978	13 November 2008	Jeremy Bulloch
11	071	22	Doctor Who and the Dinosaur Invasion	Malcolm Hulke	19 February 1976		5 November 2007	Martin Jarvis
11	072	20	Death to the Daleks	Terrance Dicks	20 July 1978		3 March 2016	Jon Culshaw (Note: Dalek voices performed by Nicholas Briggs)
11	073	43	Doctor Who and the Monster of Peladon	Terrance Dicks	20 November 1980	4 December 1980	5 March 2020	Jon Culshaw
11	074	48	Doctor Who and the Planet of the Spiders	Terrance Dicks	20 November 1975	16 October 1975	4 June 2009	Elisabeth Sladen

== Bibliography ==
- Smith, Paul (2014). The Classic Doctor Who DVD Compendium. United Kingdom: Wonderful Books. ISBN 978-0-9576062-2-7.
- Smith, Paul MC (July 2021). Based on the Popular BBC Television Serial. Wonderful Books.
- Howe, David J.; Stammers, Mark; Walker, Stephen James (1994). Doctor Who – The Seventies. London: Virgin Press. ISBN 1-85227-444-1..
