= The Lighthouse (opera) =

- Chamber opera by Peter Maxwell Davies
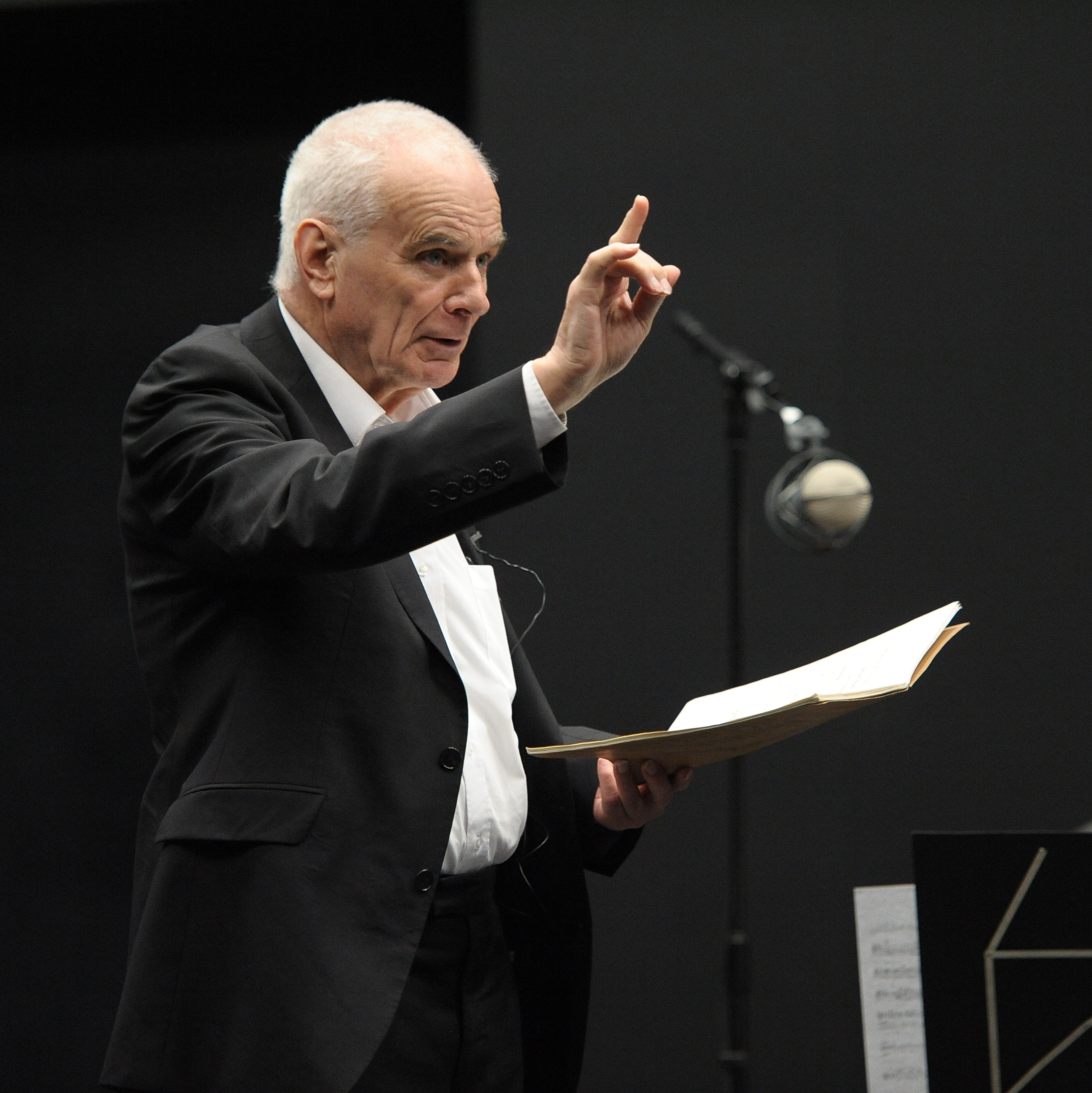
- The composer in 2012
- Premiere: 2 September 1980; Edinburgh

The Lighthouse is a chamber opera with words and music by Peter Maxwell Davies.

The scenario was inspired by a true story. In December 1900 a lighthouse supply ship called the Hesperus, based in Stromness, Orkney, went on its routine tour of duty to the Flannan Isles in the Outer Hebrides of Scotland. The lighthouse was empty - all three beds and the table looked as if they had been left in a hurry and the lamp, throughout, was in perfect working order, but the men had disappeared into thin air. The composer has taken liberties, and changed the name of the lighthouse to Fladda, this being not a usual name in the Western Isles of Scotland, to avoid offence or distress to any relatives of those concerned in the original incident.

== Production history ==
It was first performed in Edinburgh, Scotland, on 2 September 1980 as part of the Edinburgh Festival. The singers were Neil Mackie (tenor), Michael Rippon (baritone) and David Wilson-Johnson (bass-baritone) with The Fires of London conducted by Richard Dufallo. The first London performances took place at Sadlers Wells Theatre on 14, 17 and 18 July 1981 with the same cast, conducted by John Carewe.

In 1983 the Boston Shakespeare Company presented a production directed by Peter Sellars featuring Michael Brown (tenor), Sanford Sylvan (baritone), Kenneth Bell (bass), conducted by David Hoose, video by Michael Nishball, costumes by Ellen McCartney and lighting by James F. Ingalls. Writing for The New York Times, John Rockwell described the production as "superbly realized musically and thrilling as theater." Another Boston company, Boston Lyric Opera gave two performances in February 2012.

The Chicago Opera Theater presented a production in 1990.

The Dallas Opera gave three performances of the work as part of its "Chamber Opera Series" in March 2012.

English Touring Opera, which is based in London, presented two performances there in October 2012 along with five others in different English locations in October and November.

== Roles ==
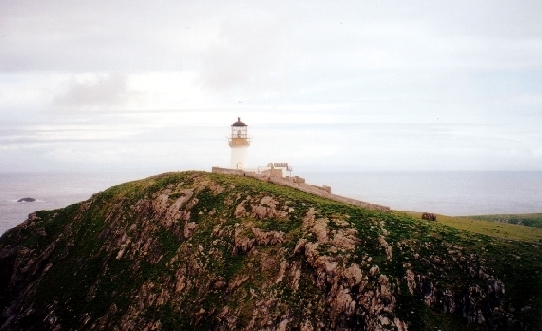
The lighthouse in question, located on Eilean Mor in the Flannan Isles

| Role | Voice type | Premiere Cast, 2 September 1980 (Conductor: Richard Dufallo) |
|---|---|---|
| Sandy (Officer 1) | tenor | Neil Mackie |
| Blazes (Officer 2) | baritone | Michael Rippon |
| Arthur (Officer 3, Voice of the cards) | bass | David Wilson-Johnson |

== Synopsis ==
The opera opens with a prologue in which three officers (tenor, baritone and bass) address a board of inquiry. They relate their voyage to the dark lighthouse and the discovery that the crew was missing, but become increasingly nervous answering the questions put to them by the orchestra's French horn and begin to contradict each other on details. Nevertheless, an open verdict is recorded and the trio sing of the ghost's modern robot replacement.

The lantern comes up to full brightness and the second half, subtitled "The Cry of the Beast", opens in the lighthouse. Arthur (bass) is leading grace and Blazes (baritone) is complaining of the food and the overdue relief crew, while Sandy (tenor) tries to keep peace between the two. He proposes a game of crib, and the sanctimonious Arthur leaves to light the lantern, issuing dire predictions as the offstage Voice of the Cards. He returns just as a fight breaks out over a card palmed by Blazes. Sandy proposes they pass the time with songs "lest we end up like beasts in a cage, eating each other". Blazes agrees: "...then we shall see who is king, who devil, and who the fool amongst us." He starts singing, the first words being "When I was a kid our street had a gang". Accompanied by bones, fiddle and banjo, it relates a murder committed by Blazes, for which his father was arrested and hanged.

Sandy takes his turn with a sentimental love ballad accompanied by cello and piano. The three stanzas turn into a less innocent catch when taken up by the other two: "...O, that you held me...by the cock...I come...crowing loud...I am aroused". Arthur counters with a Salvation Army song on The Golden Calf (brass, clarinet and tambourine) in which he seems personally to glory in the smiting of the Levites. With dismay the three notice the fog coming in – the horn must now be started, summoning first Blazes' ghosts, then Sandy's memories of his sister and a schoolmate. To Arthur, the horn summons the Golden Calf which he sees moving across the waters to claim them. "The only cure is to kill the beast!" he cries, enlisting the others to arm themselves and advance, singing a De profundis, into the night, toward its dazzling bright eye.

When the music calms, the light is seen to belong to the relief ship and the three relief officers are visible. "We had to defend ourselves, by God!" They agree on their story and tidy up quickly.

== Orchestra ==
The six regular players of The Fires of London were augmented to 12 as follows: flute doubling piccolo and alto flute, clarinet in A doubling bass clarinet in B♭; horn in F, trumpet in C, and trombone; solo strings (violin, viola, cello, double bass); piano doubling celesta and out of tune upright piano, guitar doubling banjo.

The percussion comprised marimba, glockenspiel, timpani, crotales, rototom, bass drum, bones, small suspended cymbal, side drum, tambourine, maracas, tom-toms and tamtam, all played by one percussionist, and in addition flexatone and referee's whistle (pianist), bass drum (guitarist), tamtam (violinist), and two more flexatones (violist).

== See also ==
- Flannan Isles Mystery of 1900
