= Jo Moran =

English ornithologist, wildlife photographer, mountaineer, and climber (1930–2021)

Jo Moran in the late 1960s

Joseph Moran (2 June 1930 – 11 July 2021) was an English ornithologist, wildlife photographer, mountaineer and climber. He was the first person to climb the cliffs of the Noup of Noss in Shetland, Scotland, the first to photograph the Leach's storm petrel at the nest, and was also an early influence on British mountaineer and climber Mick Burke.

== Early life ==
Joseph Moran was born in Wigan in 1930, to Thomas Moran, a gas works manager and rugby league referee, and his second wife, Julia (née Moore). His early interest in birds was inspired by reading the work of Archibald Thorburn.

== Ornithology and bird photography ==
A keen birdwatcher and photographer, between the 1950s and 1980s, Jo published several illustrated articles, on the bullfinch, the jay, the yellow bunting, the common gull, the common guillemot, the jackdaw, the ring ouzel or 'mountain blackbird', the scoter, the kestrel and sparrowhawk, the birds of the Calf of Eday in the Orkney Islands, and of the Great Saltee, as well as reflections on hybridisation of British birds, and the practice of ornithology, all illustrated with his original photographic work.

In 1958, with friends Vince Connolly and Harry Shorrock, Jo photographed the Leach's petrel at the nest, on Eilean Mòr in the Flannan Islands. This photograph, published in Scotland's Magazine in 1961, is considered to be the first instance of this bird being photographed at the nest. Jo later gave illustrated public lectures on this and related topics, including, for example, in 1997 and 1999 for several Ornithological Societies in Cheshire.

In the late 1950s, a few years after the evacuation of the islands in 1953, he visited Great Blasket (Na Blascaodaí) and Inishvickillane (Inis Mhic Aoibhleáin) off County Kerry in Ireland, to establish whether there was a breeding colony of Leach's petrels in this archipelago. His illustrated record of this visit has been accessioned by the museum of The Blasket Centre in Dunquin (a heritage and cultural centre/museum honouring the unique community who lived on the remote Blasket Islands until their evacuation). During this trip, as noted in the accessioned documents, he met and was assisted by Muiris 'Kruger' Kavanagh, publican, raconteur and prominent figure in Irish cultural history.

Jo travelled throughout Orkney, Shetland and the west of Ireland and photographed all the British nesting seabirds at the nest. His photographic work was publicly exhibited in 2007, at Rivington Park Gallery in Lancashire.

== Mountaineering and rock climbing ==
Jo is credited with making the first ascent of the cliffs of the Noup of Noss, in Shetland. He published an account of the climb in 1968, in The Countryman magazine.

Jo Moran was a member of the Wigan Mountaineering Association, where he met the young Mick Burke, who was to become a celebrated mountaineer and climber. Jo took Mick on his first hike up 2000 ft Pendle Hill in Lancashire. During this period, he met musician Barry Halpin, who was later to be mistaken for missing peer Lord Lucan. Jo won the title of Wigan Mountaineering Association's 'Mountain Man of the Year' for 1967, winning an 18-hr three-part walk-off starting at midnight at Wastwater Lake, up the Pillar massif via the summits of Red Pike and Steeple, eventually arriving at Seatoller at dawn. The second part saw Moran walk over Stonethwaite and Greenup Edge to Grasmere, and the third took in Heron Pike, Erne Crag, High Rigg Man, Fairfield and the Helvellyn range.

Following the death of Mick Burke during an attempted ascent of Mt Everest in 1975, Jo Moran was one of three founders (along with Richard Toon and Allan Rimmer) of the Mick Burke Memorial Trust, a charity intended to support young people from Wigan and its surrounding districts in novel or pioneering outdoor activity. Peter Boardman, then National Officer of the British Mountaineering Council, acted as chairman of the selection panel viewing applications for funding. In its first year, the Trust made awards to five applicants, supporting projects including a sailing-climbing expedition on the Norwegian coast, and a mineral survey of old mine workings in mid-Wales.

== Rugby League ==
Jo was a fervent supporter of rugby league, corresponding at length with The Guardian newspaper's sports correspondent Frank Keating. He was one of four letter writers who wrote to Keating for several years in response to his errant 2001 forecast of the game's imminent extinction. In 2006, Keating acknowledged his error in a piece entitled "Call off the dogs: I'm no longer in league with the devil" in which he described Moran's critique as 'caustically despairing'.
