= Holm of Noss =

Islet in the Shetland Islands, Scotland

Coordinates: 60°7′58″N 1°0′36″W

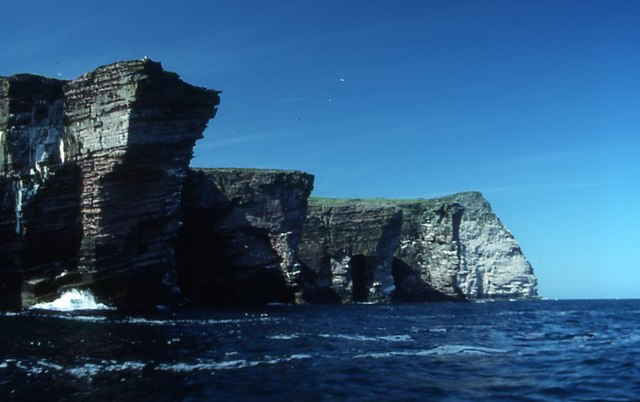
Noss and the Holm of Noss

The Holm of Noss or Cradle Holm is an uninhabited islet of the Shetland Islands. It is about 48m at its highest point.

== Geography and geology ==
It is a tabular islet with vertical faces about 160 ft (49 m) high, and is adjacent to the Isle of Noss, from which it is separated by a 20 metres (66 ft). gap Both the Holm of Noss, and the adjacent Faedda Ness on Noss are riddled with caves.

== History ==
The island's other name, "Cradle Holm", comes from a small hoist, or cradle, which used to run between the island and Noss, for around 200 years from the 17th century, to 1864. It was said to be big enough to be able to take one man, and one sheep.

In 1864, the laird's factor, Mr Walker, had the cradle dismantled on the grounds of safety, and had a wall erected on the neighbouring cliff on Noss. The crofter who constructed the original cradle is said to have won his bet, that he could not climb it, but died shortly after constructing the cradle.
