= Horror of Fang Rock =

1977 Doctor Who serial

092 – Horror of Fang Rock
- Doctor Who serial

Cast
- Doctor: Tom Baker – Fourth Doctor
- Companion: Louise Jameson – Leela
- Others: John Abbott – Vince Hawkins; Colin Douglas – Reuben (Note: Also provided Rutan voice uncredited.); Ralph Watson – Ben; Sean Caffrey – Lord Palmerdale; Alan Rowe – Colonel Skinsale; Annette Woollett – Adelaide; Rio Fanning – Harker

Production
- Directed by: Paddy Russell
- Written by: Terrance Dicks
- Script editor: Robert Holmes
- Produced by: Graham Williams
- Executive producer: None
- Music by: Dudley Simpson
- Production code: 4V
- Series: Season 15
- Running time: 4 episodes, 25 minutes each
- First broadcast: 3–24 September 1977

Chronology
← Preceded by The Talons of Weng-Chiang	Followed by → The Invisible Enemy

Horror of Fang Rock is the first serial of the 15th season of the British science fiction television series Doctor Who, which was first broadcast in four weekly parts on BBC1 from 3 to 24 September 1977.

The serial is set on the fictional English island of Fang Rock in the early 20th century, where a shapeshifting alien scout called a Rutan arrives on Earth intending to use the planet as a strategic base in the Rutans' war against the Sontarans.

== Plot ==
The TARDIS lands on the island of Fang Rock, off the south coast of England in the early 20th century. Noticing that the lighthouse isn't functioning properly, the Doctor decides to investigate, and to ask for directions, as the TARDIS seems to have got 'lost in the fog'. Arriving at the lighthouse, and after introducing themselves, the Doctor and Leela discover the dead body of one of the keepers, Ben. The other two keepers, Reuben and Vince Hawkins, report that a light fell from the sky near the island. They also explain the electricity flow to the lamp on the lighthouse has become erratic and the Doctor deduces something is feeding on the flow. As the Doctor and Leela explore, something moves Ben's body onto the island, and they witness an electric crackling nearby.

The lack of light causes a luxury yacht to crash onto Fang Rock. The four survivors are brought to the lighthouse: the bosun Harker; Colonel James Skinsale MP; the owner, Lord Palmerdale; and his secretary Adelaide Lessage. Sometime later, Harker and the Doctor retrieve Ben's body, and the Doctor deduces it has been used as an anatomy lesson by an alien life form, determining they should therefore secure the lighthouse. Reuben disappears for a time, reappearing a changed man, apparently due to shock. Palmerdale and Harker are killed; and an alien light emanates from Reuben. The Doctor finds Harker's body and then Reuben's – the latter cold.

The creature attempts to kill the others in the lighthouse, and with its presence now revealed, sheds its disguise as Reuben, revealing it to be a Rutan, whose ship crash-landed in the sea and who is trying to summon its mother ship. The Rutans, losing a long war against their hereditary enemies, the Sontarans, plan to turn the strategically located Earth into a base; however this will certainly make the Sontarans bombard the Earth with photonic missiles, taking countless human lives in the process. The Doctor uses a flashbomb to disorient the Rutan, forcing it to retreat. The Doctor and Skinsale retrieve diamonds from Palmerdale's body belt, but Skinsale is killed by the Rutan in the process. The Doctor then modifies a flare mortar to destroy the alien, and uses the diamonds to focus the lighthouse beam, converting it into a high-energy laser, and destroying the Rutan mothership. The Doctor quotes Wilfrid Wilson Gibson's poem Flannan Isle as they leave.

== Production ==
The serial was the first to be broadcast under new producer Graham Williams, who succeeded Philip Hinchcliffe.

Working titles for this story included The Monster of Fang Rock and The Beast of Fang Rock. Horror of Fang Rock was a late replacement for the scripts Terrance Dicks had originally submitted, a vampire-based tale entitled The Vampire Mutations, which was cancelled close to production as it was feared it could detract from the BBC's Count Dracula, a high-profile adaptation of Bram Stoker's classic novel Dracula, which was due for transmission close to when the serial would have aired. A re-written version did, however, eventually see production in 1980 as State of Decay, part of the eighteenth season of Doctor Who.

The serial is the only one of the original series to have been produced at BBC studios outside London. Engineering work at those studios meant that it was made at the Pebble Mill Studios of BBC Birmingham instead. According to the DVD commentary supplied by Louise Jameson, John Abbott and Terrance Dicks, a scene in part three was crucial to the behind-the-scenes relationship between Jameson and co-star Tom Baker. In one scene, he consistently came in ahead of his cue, thereby upstaging her. On the grounds that this move was "not what they had rehearsed" she insisted on three successive retakes until he came in at the rehearsed time. This eventually won his respect. From that point forward, she claims their working relationship was much smoother.

Louise Jameson stops wearing her brown contact lenses at the end of this serial, with the sudden change in colour being explained as a pigment dispersal caused by looking directly into a bright explosion. As mentioned in more than one DVD commentary Jameson had found the lenses painful to wear, and made their removal a condition for her agreeing to play Leela for another season.

=== The Ballad of Flannan Isle ===
Many elements of the episode were based on a poem, Flannan Isle by Wilfrid Wilson Gibson, which the Doctor quotes from at the end of the story; the poem itself was inspired by the mysterious disappearance of three lighthouse keepers from the Flannan Isles in 1900.

=== Cast notes ===
Alan Rowe had previously played Dr. Evans and provided the voice from Space Control in The Moonbase (1967) as well as Edward of Wessex in The Time Warrior (1973–74) and later appeared as Garif in the serial Full Circle (1980). Ralph Watson had previously played Captain Knight in The Web of Fear (1968) as well as Ettis in The Monster of Peladon (1974). Colin Douglas had previously played Donald Bruce in The Enemy of the World (1967–68).

== Broadcast and reception ==
Episode	Title	Run time	Original release date	UK viewers (millions)
1	"Part One"	24:10	3 September 1977	6.8
2	"Part Two"	24:10	10 September 1977	7.1
3	"Part Three"	23:12	17 September 1977	9.8
4	"Part Four"	23:49	24 September 1977	9.9

Paul Cornell, Martin Day, and Keith Topping wrote of the serial in The Discontinuity Guide (1995), "A masterpiece, designed to do nothing more than scare kids, which it does very efficiently. It's a very good Leela story, too." In The Television Companion (1998), David J. Howe and Stephen James Walker were also positive, describing it as "a tightly constructed drama that succeeds because of, rather than in spite of, its confined setting and limited cast". They praised the sets, atmosphere, and most of the acting. In Doctor Who: The Complete Guide, Mark Campbell awarded it ten out of ten, considering it "strong on atmosphere" and "a tense, scary tale that makes a virtue of its small cast and claustrophobic locale." He concluded that it was "superlative in every way".

In 2010, Mark Braxton of Radio Times awarded it four stars out of five, calling the serial "classy, cosy, autumnal Who", with many positives, including the good characterisation of Leela, the shock of the Doctor admitting he had done something wrong, and the characterisation of the lighthouse crew. The A.V. Club's Christopher Bahn was critical of the pacing of the end of the story and the "often unconvincing" special effects, but considered the serial to be, despite some flaws, "a classic base-under-siege chiller". Writing for The Guardian in 2019, Toby Hadoke described it as "a claustrophobic masterpiece dripping with mordant humour and suspense". For Den of Geek, Andrew Blair wrote that Leela's line "you will do as the Doctor says or I will cut out your heart" was his favourite Leela moment, adding that "what makes this scene even funnier is that the camera immediately cuts to the Doctor, who bursts into a massive grin."

=== Max Headroom intrusion ===
On the night of 22 November 1987, a broadcast of the first part of Horror of Fang Rock by Chicago television station WTTW was interrupted for around 90 seconds by a pirate broadcast featuring an unknown individual, who was disguised as the television character Max Headroom. The incident made national headlines; however, the people responsible were never identified.

== Commercial releases ==
=== In print ===
Doctor Who and the Horror of Fang Rock
- Author: Terrance Dicks
- Cover artist: Jeff Cummins
- Series: Doctor Who book: Target novelisations
- Release number: 32
- Publisher: Target Books
- Publication date: 30 March 1978
- ISBN: 0-426-20009-8

A novelisation of this serial, written by Terrance Dicks, was published by Target Books in March 1978. According to the DVD commentary, this novelisation features his favourite cover.

=== Home media ===
Horror of Fang Rock was released on VHS in July 1998. It was released on Region 2 DVD in the United Kingdom on 17 January 2005, in Australia on Region 4 DVD on 7 April 2005, and in the United States on Region 1 DVD on 6 September 2005. In March 2024, the story was released again in an upgraded format for Blu-ray, including new special effects, being included with the other stories from Season 15 in the Doctor Who - The Collection Box Set. Most notably, the original Rutan was replaced with a redesigned puppet.

The soundtrack, with linking narration by Louise Jameson, was released on vinyl by Demon Records on 19 February 2021.
