= Death to the Daleks =

072 – Death to the Daleks
- Doctor Who serial

Cast
- Doctor: Jon Pertwee – Third Doctor
- Companion: Elisabeth Sladen – Sarah Jane Smith
- Others: Duncan Lamont – Dan Galloway; John Abineri – Richard Railton; Joy Harrison – Jill Tarrant; Julian Fox – Peter Hamilton; Neil Seiler – Commander Stewart; Arnold Yarrow – Bellal; Roy Heymann – Gotal; Mostyn Evans – High Priest; Michael Wisher – Dalek Voices; John Scott Martin, Murphy Grumbar, Cy Town – Daleks

Production
- Directed by: Michael E. Briant
- Written by: Terry Nation
- Script editor: Terrance Dicks; Robert Holmes (uncredited)
- Produced by: Barry Letts
- Music by: Carey Blyton
- Production code: XXX
- Series: Season 11
- Running time: 4 episodes, 25 minutes each
- First broadcast: 23 February 1974
- Last broadcast: 16 March 1974

Chronology
← Preceded by Invasion of the Dinosaurs	Followed by → The Monster of Peladon

Death to the Daleks is the third serial of the 11th season of the British science fiction television series Doctor Who, which was first broadcast in four weekly parts on BBC1 from 23 February to 16 March 1974.

In the serial, the Daleks and a human expedition both arrive on the planet Exxilon to seek a mineral found in abundance there. This was the last serial to have an episode's master tape wiped, but all episodes now exist in their original 625 line colour in the archives.

== Plot ==
The TARDIS suffers an energy drain and lands on the planet Exxilon. The Third Doctor and Sarah Jane Smith go to investigate and become separated. The Doctor is captured by the planet's inhabitants, the Exxilons, but escapes. A party of humans from the Marine Space Corps find the Doctor and take him to their ship, which has also been stranded. They are on an expedition to mine "Parrinium," a mineral which can cure a deadly space plague. Sarah Jane is attacked by one of the creatures and flees towards a city with a flashing beacon. She is captured and taken to the Exxilons' caves to be sacrificed by their High Priest.

Another ship arrives, and four Daleks emerge. Their ship and weapons have also been affected by the energy drain. The Daleks claim that several of their planetary colonies are suffering from plague; thus they need Parrinium for the same reason as the humans. The Daleks, the Doctor, and the humans form an uneasy alliance to obtain Parrinium and escape Exxilon. While making their way to the humans' mining dome, the Exxilons ambush them. A battle ensues and the Exxilons kill a human and a Dalek and capture the others. The prisoners are taken to the caves where the Doctor interrupts Sarah Jane's sacrifice; therefore, he is also condemned to death. When the dual sacrifice commences, a second party of Daleks arrive with projectile weapons unaffected by the energy drain. The Daleks kill a number of Exxilons, then force the survivors and humans to mine Parrinium.

The Doctor and Sarah Jane flee underground and meet a group of fugitive Exxilons. Their leader, Bellal, explains that the city was built by the Exxilons' ancestors, who were once capable of space travel. They built the city to be capable of maintaining, repairing, and protecting itself. Fitting the structure with a brain meant that the city no longer needed its creators. On realising this, the Exxilons had tried to destroy the city, but the city destroyed most of them. Bellal's people seek to destroy the city and ensure their race's survival. Bellal explains that the city supports itself through underground "roots" and the aerial beacon. The Doctor realises that the beacon must be the cause of the energy drain. He and Bellal go to the city to resolve the problem.

The Daleks come to the same conclusion and create two timed explosives to destroy the beacon. One Dalek supervises two humans placing the explosives, but one of the humans, Galloway, secretly keeps one bomb. Two other Daleks enter the city to investigate the superstructure just behind the Doctor and Bellal. The two parties proceed through the city, passing a series of intelligence tests. On reaching the central chamber, the Doctor begins to sabotage the city's computer brain; the machine responds by creating two Exxilon-like "antibodies" to "neutralise" the Doctor and Bellal. They are saved when the Daleks enter and fight the antibodies, and the Doctor and Bellal escape as the city's sabotaged controls begin to malfunction. The two Daleks inside are destroyed.

When the bomb on the beacon explodes, all power is restored. The Daleks order the humans to load the Parrinium onto their ship. The Daleks intend to fire a plague missile onto the planet, destroying all life and making future landings impossible, so that they will have the only source of Parrinium. Their true intention for hoarding Parrinium is to blackmail the galactic powers to accept their demands; refusal would mean the deaths of millions. As their ship takes off, Sarah Jane reveals that the Daleks have only bags of sand while the real Parrinium is on the Earth ship. Galloway has smuggled himself and his bomb aboard the Dalek ship; he detonates the bomb, destroying the Dalek ship before it fires the plague missile. Back on Exxilon, the City disintegrates and collapses.

== Production ==
A quarry in Dorset was used for location filming

Working titles for this story were The Exilons and The Exxilons. The incidental music for this serial was composed by Carey Blyton and performed by the London Saxophone Quartet.

This is one of two Third Doctor serials (the other being The Claws of Axos) to still have a 90-minute PAL studio recording tape.

Exterior scenes on the planet Exxilon were filmed on location at Binnegar Plain quarry in Dorset.

=== Missing episodes ===
Part One of this story was chronologically the last to have its original master videotape wiped for re-use. This was initially returned to the BBC archive in 1979 through the discovery of a 525-line NTSC recording from Canada. Subsequently, two separate PAL recordings were discovered, including a high quality 625-line recording returned in 1991 as part of a shipment from Dubai. The other PAL copy of episode 1 had been returned to the BBC from Australia in 1985, along with additional copies of episodes 2–4, although the episode had been edited and censored.

== Broadcast and reception ==
Episode	Title	Run time	Original release date	UK viewers (millions)	Archive
1	"Part One"	24:32	23 February 1974	8.1	PAL 2" colour videotape
2	"Part Two"	24:25	2 March 1974	9.5	PAL 2" colour videotape
3	"Part Three"	24:24	9 March 1974	10.5	PAL 2" colour videotape
4	"Part Four"	24:35	16 March 1974	9.5	PAL 2" colour videotape

Paul Cornell, Martin Day, and Keith Topping wrote of the serial in The Discontinuity Guide (1995), "A confused story with, for once, too much rather than too little plot. There really doesn't seem any need to have the Daleks in it at all. There are some adequate sacrifice scenes for Sarah to scream in, but the production seems tired and insipid". In The Television Companion (1998), David J. Howe and Stephen James Walker were more positive, even opining that it was the best of the eleventh season. They wrote that, despite the "small scale" action, "the scripts are still well-written and entertaining, with a good premise and some interesting concepts", and the story overall was "of excellent set pieces and impressive images". However, Howe and Walker were less impressed with the model shots of the city disintegrating, the Exxilons' character depth, and the incidental music.

In 2010, Patrick Mulkern of Radio Times wrote that the story had appeal, with the Daleks at their "duplicitous best" and the first episode being "arguably the most effective episode of season 11". However, he was critical of Blyton's score and felt that Pertwee and the guest cast seemed unenthused, and also noted that the Doctor and Sarah lacked chemistry and the Doctor "verges on insufferably patronising and is landed with dreadful lines". DVD Talk's John Sinnott gave Death to the Daleks four out of five stars, praising the Daleks, the pace, and the supporting characters, and in contrast to Mulkern, he praised the chemistry between the Doctor and Sarah. However, he felt that the ending in which the Doctor solves puzzles was simplistic and lacked suspense. Ian Berriman, reviewing the serial for SFX, rated it three out of four stars, describing it as "a perfectly adequate four episodes of generic action-adventure". Berriman praised the atmospheric direction, Bellal, and felt that the score "effectively conjures an air of the uncanny". However, he felt that the Daleks were "daft", and criticised the puzzle plot and Jill, the "feeble" sole female character.

== Commercial releases ==
=== In print ===
Death to the Daleks
- Author: Terrance Dicks
- Cover artist: Roy Knipe
- Series: Doctor Who book: Target novelisations
- Release number: 20
- Publisher: Target Books
- Publication date: 20 July 1978
- ISBN: 0-426-20042-X

A novelisation of this serial, written by Terrance Dicks, was published by Target Books in July 1978. A German translation was published in 1990 by Goldmann.

=== Home media ===
The serial was released on video in an omnibus format in July 1987, the first Doctor Who video to be released on just VHS, instead of both VHS and Betamax. As the PAL version of episode 1 from Dubai was not yet known to exist and the one from Australia was censored, this used the NTSC version of the episode. In the US, it was released by Playhouse Video (a subsidiary of CBS/Fox Video) on VHS and Beta. An episodic release (with the PAL version of episode 1 from Dubai) was released on 13 February 1995, although episode two was slightly edited due to BBC Video mistakenly using a cut version of episode 2 returned from ABC TV in Australia (episodes 3 & 4 were also from ABC TV, but uncensored), instead of the UK master tapes of episodes 2–4.

After a fan complained to BBC Video that, despite claiming to contain the 'complete and unedited' serial, the Death to the Daleks VHS actually used the censored Australian edits, BBC Video head Sue Kerr contacted video restorer Paul Vanezis to uncover of the origin of the mistake. After discovering that the BBC archival staff would send the most conveniently formatted tapes, rather than necessarily the most complete versions (something they would have no knowledge of), Vanezis offered to oversee future Doctor Who VHS releases with the Doctor Who Restoration Team. "And that's what we did," he later said. "Death to the Daleks was the killer. That's really how the Restoration Team got the VHS releases."

Death to the Daleks was released on DVD in the UK on 18 June 2012, and in region 1 on 10 July 2012. The DVD release used both the PAL version of episode 1 from Dubai and the UK master tapes of episodes 2–4.
