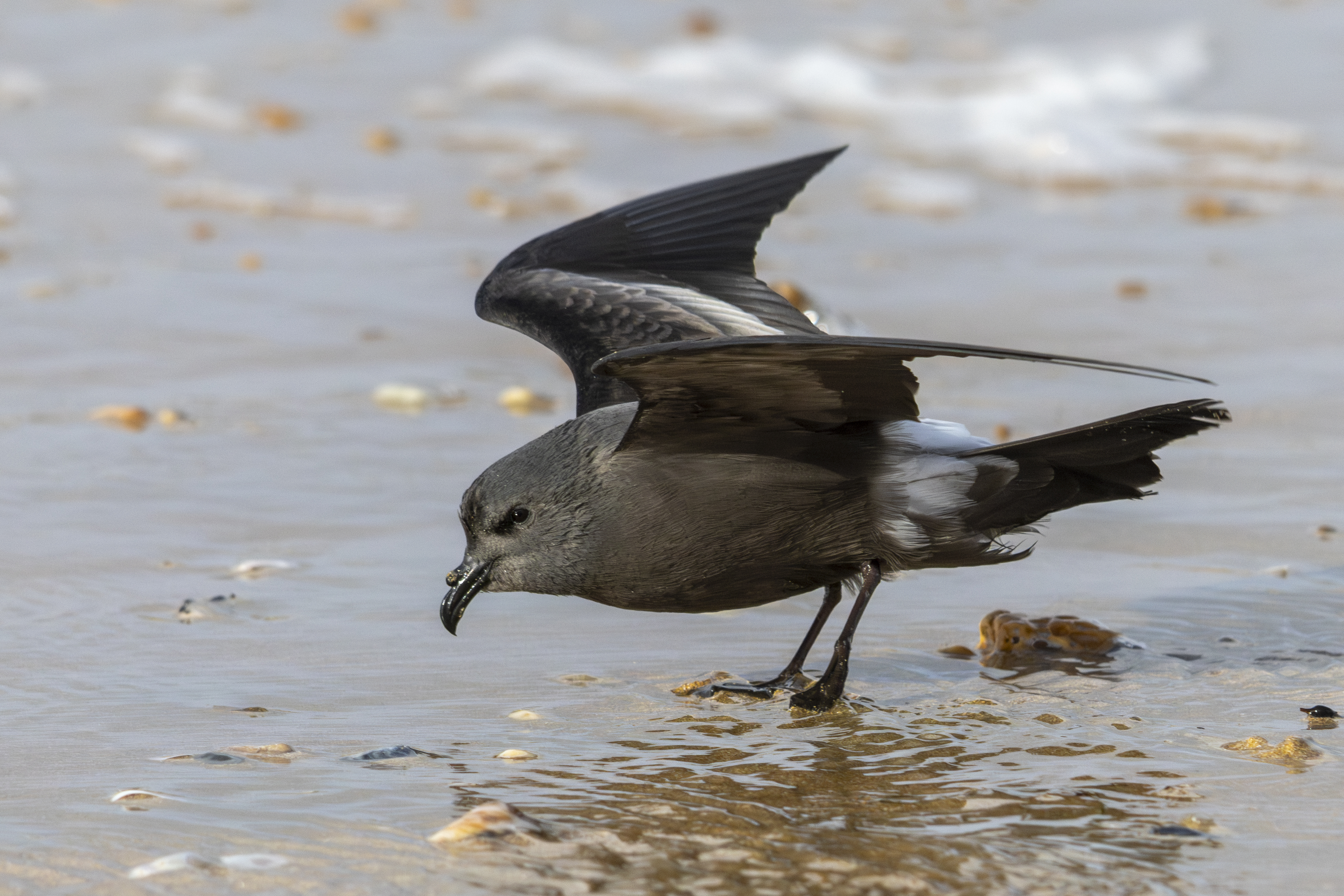

Conservation status
- Vulnerable (IUCN 3.1)

Scientific classification
- Kingdom: Animalia
- Phylum: Chordata
- Class: Aves
- Order: Procellariiformes
- Family: Hydrobatidae
- Genus: Hydrobates
- Species: H. leucorhous

Binomial name
- Hydrobates leucorhous (Vieillot, 1818)

Subspecies
- See text

Synonyms
- List: Procellaria leucorhoa Vieillot, 1818; Procellaria leachii Temminck, 1820; Procellaria atlantica Bonaparte, 1824; Procellaria bullockii (nomen novum for P. leachii) Fleming, 1828; Oceanodroma beali Emerson, 1906; Oceanodroma beldingi Emerson, 1906; Oceanodroma leucorhoa willetti (=socorroensis?) van Rossem, 1942; Cymochorea leucorhoa muriwai Mathews & Hallstrom, 1943

= Leach's storm petrel =

Species of bird

Leach's storm petrel or Leach's petrel (Hydrobates leucorhous) is a small seabird of the tubenose order. It is named after the British zoologist William Elford Leach. The scientific name is derived from Ancient Greek. Hydrobates is from hydōr "water", and batēs "walker", and leucorhous is from leukos, "white" and orrhos, "rump". It was formerly treated in the genus Oceanodroma before that genus was merged into Hydrobates.

It breeds on inaccessible islands in the colder northern areas of the North Atlantic and North Pacific Oceans. The only breeding colony in the Southern Hemisphere is located on Dassen Island in South Africa. It nests in colonies close to the sea in well concealed areas such as rock crevices, shallow burrows, or even logs. It lays a single white egg, which often has a faint ring of purple spots at the large end. This storm petrel is strictly nocturnal at the breeding sites to avoid predation by gulls and skuas, and even avoids coming to land on clear, moonlit nights. The largest colony of Leach's storm petrels can be found on Baccalieu Island off eastern Canada, an ecological reserve with ~1.95 million pairs of the birds at last estimate in 2013. As with European storm petrel, birds breeding at the northern limit of the species' range on the Arctic Circle in Norway have to delay their breeding until autumn to avoid the 24-hour daylight of the high summer.

== Description ==
Leach's petrel is a small bird at 18–21 cm in length with a 43–48 cm wingspan. Like many other storm petrels, it has all-black plumage except for a paler grey-brown bar on secondary wing coverts on the wing, a slightly paler face, and usually a white rump with a hint of a dark divide down the middle. However, dark-rumped individuals exist on the west coast of North America; they are very rare north of southern California, but the percentage increases suddenly on the United States-Mexico border, where 90-100% of breeding birds are dark-rumped. In the Atlantic, it can be readily distinguished from the European storm petrel and Wilson's storm petrel by its larger size, forked tail, different rump pattern, and flight behaviour, but separating it from band-rumped storm petrels is difficult; identification involves characteristics such as the extent of white on the rump and flight pattern. Identification in the Pacific proves more difficult; the dark-rumped form can be confused with at least three other all-dark storm petrel species. Here, identification involves close attention to wingbeats and overall colour. It has a fluttering flight, and patters on the water as it picks planktonic food items from the ocean surface. Like most petrels, its walking ability is limited to a short shuffle to the burrow.

== Subspecies ==
Two subspecies are accepted:

- H. l. leucorhous — (Vieillot, 1818) — islands of the North Atlantic and North Pacific oceans. Rump usually white.
- H. l. chapmani — von Berlepsch, 1906 — Coronados and San Benito Island off western Mexico. Rump usually dark.

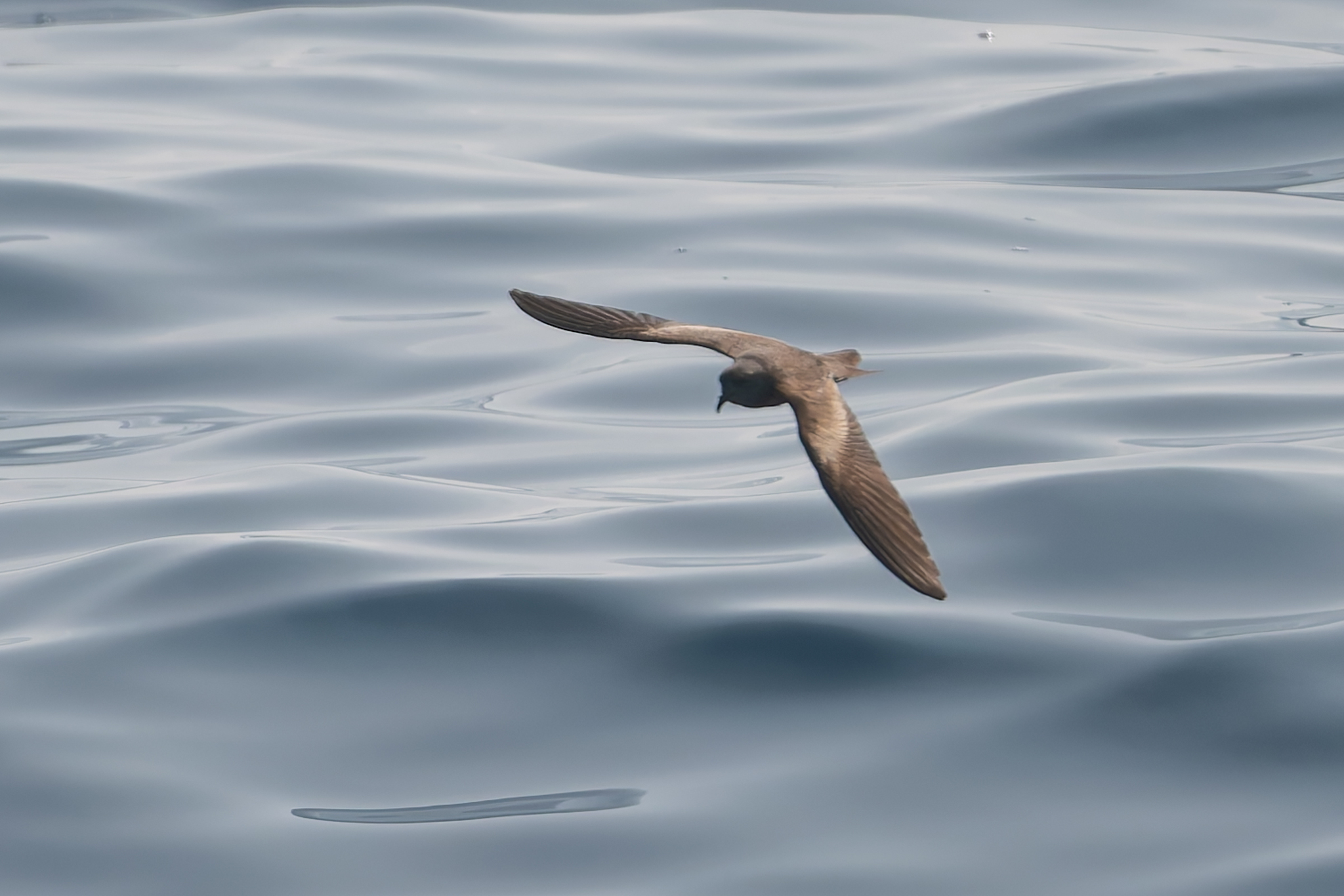
Dark-rumped H. l. chapmani off the southern California coast

== Distribution and habitat ==
It is strictly pelagic outside the breeding season, and this, together with its remote island breeding sites, makes Leach's petrel a difficult bird to see from land. Only in storms might this species be pushed into headlands. Unlike the European storm petrel, it does not follow ships. In Europe, the best chance of seeing this species is in autumn in Liverpool Bay between north Wales and northwest England. Strong north-westerly gales can funnel migrating Leach's petrels into this bay. British ornithologists Robert Atkinson and John Ainslie observed the communities of Leach's petrel on the remote Scottish islands of North Rona between 16 July and 12 August 1936, and on Sula Sgeir between 3 and 4 August 1939. The bird was first photographed at the nest in 1958, on Eilean Mor, one of the Flannan Isles off the west coast of the Outer Hebrides in Scotland, by Jo Moran.

== Ecology ==
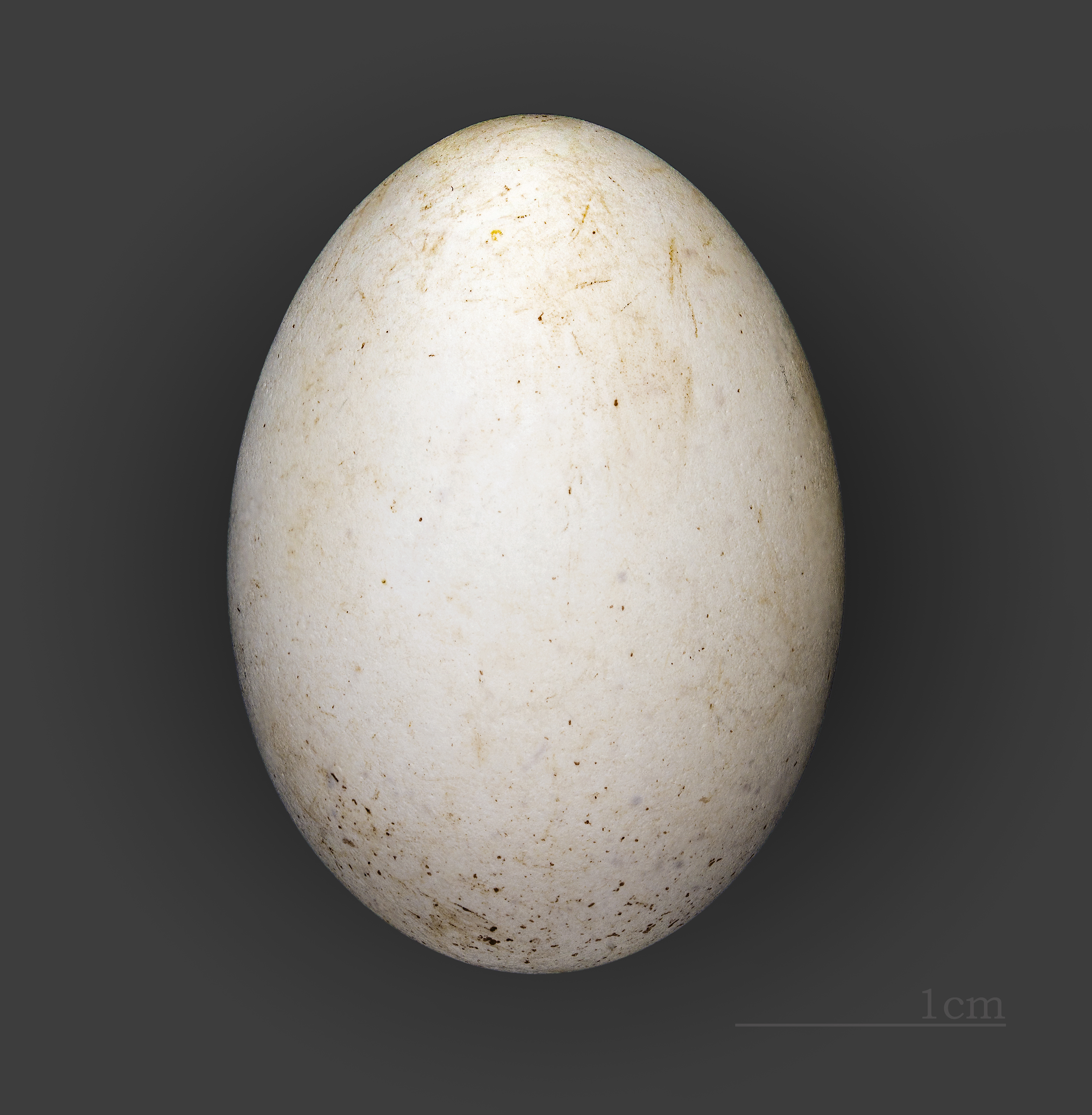
Egg of Leach's storm petrel (coll.MHNT)

The lifespan is unusually long for a bird of such small size, with an average of 13 years, and a maximum recorded lifespan of 38+ years (a bird ringed between 1979 and 1982, and recaptured in 2019 still healthy). In 2003, it was found that the bird's telomeres lengthen with age, the only known example to date of such a phenomenon. However, this phenomenon likely also occurs in other members of the Procellariiformes, which all have rather long lifespans compared to their size.

They feed primarily on plankton, including euphausiids, copepods, and a form of amphipod that is parasitic on jellyfish gonadal pouches. They also feed to a large extent on myctophids (lantern fish), which only occur at the surface at night in water over the continental slope. Individuals have been observed to feed at distances up to 1000 km from their breeding colony. A breeding individual stores energy-rich lipids in a sac anterior to its stomach, which is used to either sustain itself while incubating its single egg, to feed its chick, or as a defensive mechanism when caught by a predator, as do many other Procellariformes. Some evidence shows that parents feed their chicks different prey species from what they consume themselves. Parent birds also accidentally feed their chicks plastic debris, which they mistake for food items floating on the surface of the ocean. Chicks grow to a prefledging weight almost double that of when they actually fledge from the burrow in late September. During their migration, they travel to waters associated with the North Equatorial Current, or to waters associated with the Benguela Current. Fall storms can cause these young fledging individuals to wreck on the mainland.
