= The Monster of Peladon =

1974 British Doctor Who sci-fi TV serial

073 – The Monster of Peladon
- Doctor Who serial

Cast
- Doctor: Jon Pertwee – Third Doctor
- Companion: Elisabeth Sladen – Sarah Jane Smith
- Others: Nina Thomas – Queen Thalira; Frank Gatliff – Chancellor Ortron; Rex Robinson – Gebek; Ralph Watson – Ettis; Graeme Eton – Preba; Michael Crane – Blor; Terry Walsh – Guard Captain; Max Faulkner, Roy Evans – Miners; Nick Hobbs – Aggedor; Donald Gee – Eckersley; Stuart Fell – Body of Alpha Centauri; Ysanne Churchman – Voice of Alpha Centauri; Alan Bennion – Ice Lord Azaxyr; Sonny Caldinez – Sskel; Gerald Taylor – Vega Nexos

Production
- Directed by: Lennie Mayne
- Written by: Brian Hayles
- Script editor: Terrance Dicks
- Produced by: Barry Letts
- Music by: Dudley Simpson
- Production code: YYY
- Series: Season 11
- Running time: 6 episodes, 25 minutes each
- First broadcast: 23 March 1974
- Last broadcast: 27 April 1974

Chronology
← Preceded by Death to the Daleks	Followed by → Planet of the Spiders

The Monster of Peladon is the fourth serial of the 11th season of the British science fiction television series Doctor Who, which was first broadcast in six weekly parts on BBC1 from 23 March to 27 April 1974. It was Jon Pertwee's penultimate serial as the Third Doctor.

The serial is set on the mineral-rich planet Peladon 50 years after the 1972 serial The Curse of Peladon. In the serial, the engineer Eckersley (Donald Gee) and the rogue Ice Warrior Commander Azaxyr (Alan Bennion) conspire to take over the planet and sell its minerals to Peladon's enemies in Galaxy Five.

== Plot ==
On the planet Peladon a power struggle is in place between the trisilicate miners and the ruling class, with miners under the leadership of Gebek and hot-headed Ettis calling for improved conditions. The planet's ruler Queen Thalira, daughter of the late King Peladon, is sympathetic, but knows her planet is vital to supply the war effort of the Galactic Federation of which it is a member. The Federation is in conflict with the warlike Galaxy Five confederation. The miners become concerned when a vision of Aggedor, the royal beast, starts appearing in the mines and killing miners, including the alien engineer Vega Nexos. Chancellor Ortron tries to convince the Queen this is a sign of displeasure at the alien presence on the planet, but she remains unconvinced.

Another alien presence reaches the Citadel: the TARDIS, bearing the Third Doctor and Sarah Jane Smith. The Doctor recalls his visit to Peladon 50 years earlier when the planet joined the Galactic Federation, and is pleased to find a familiar face in Alpha Centauri, the Federation Ambassador. The Queen knows of the Doctor from her father and enlists his support in trying to find the cause of the manifestations of Aggedor. He guesses someone is deliberately trying to interrupt trisilicate production, and they seem to have succeeded when the miners decide to strike. Ettis then leads an attack on the Federation armoury and gets weapons for the striking miners. This threatens to slow trisilicate supplies even further, so Engineer Eckersley, a human in charge of the refinery, coaxes Alpha Centauri to send for Federation troops to help restore order.

Both the miners and the Pel leaders are unhappy with the notion of Federation occupation, especially when the responding Ice Warriors display their ruthlessness in shooting down Pels. The sole concern of the force leader, Commander Azaxyr, is to maintain trisilicate production. There is now a realignment in Pel politics: Ortron and Gebek join forces in seeking to rid the planet of the Ice Warriors. Ettis, however, has become crazed and is killed trying to blow up the Citadel. The Ice Warriors now impose martial law on the capital, imprisoning the Queen and her courtiers, and even killing Ortron when he tries to flee.

The truth is now revealed: Azaxyr and Eckersley are both Galaxy Five agents and have engineered the crisis and occupation as a means to control the trisilicate supply. The Aggedor apparition was just an image created to support the panic. Gebek now leads the Pels in a final assault on the Ice Warriors, and Azaxyr and the other invaders are killed. Eckersley himself is killed by the real Aggedor when he attacks the Queen, though the beast dies in the process. News reaches Peladon that Galaxy Five has capitulated, its Peladon stratagem thwarted, and Queen Thalira seeks to repair the society when she appoints Gebek her new Chancellor. As ever, the Doctor and Sarah slip away quietly.

== Production ==
The mineral was named Trisilicate because Barry Letts saw it listed on the back of a tube of Boots toothpaste as one of the ingredients.

It was Brian Hayles' last story for Doctor Who.

=== Cast notes ===
The character played by Roy Evans is credited as "Miner" on-screen, but is named as Rima in dialogue – and is also credited as such in the Radio Times. Ralph Watson previously appeared in the Patrick Troughton story The Web of Fear (1968) and would later appear in the Tom Baker story Horror of Fang Rock (1977). Likewise, Rex Robinson appeared in the previous season's debut The Three Doctors (Doctor Who) and would later appear in The Hand of Fear. Gerald Taylor operated Daleks in all 60s Dalek stories; he previously appeared in The Web Planet (1965) as a Zarbi, the Operator and voice for Wotan in The War Machines (1966), Damon's assistant in The Underwater Menace (1967) and Baker's Man in The Dæmons (1971).

Both Alan Bennion and Sonny Caldinez had regularly appeared as Ice Warriors in their previous appearances, with Bennion playing different "Ice Lord" characters in both The Seeds of Death (1969) and The Curse of Peladon (1972), while Caldinez had appeared in all three preceding Ice Warrior serials. Additionally, Caldinez had played the mute Kemel in The Evil of the Daleks (1967). Donald Gee had previously appeared as "Major Ian Warne" in The Space Pirates (1969).

== Broadcast and reception ==
Episode	Title	Run time	Original release date	UK viewers (millions)	Archive
1	"Part One"	24:59	23 March 1974	9.2	PAL 2" colour videotape
2	"Part Two"	23:26	30 March 1974	6.8	PAL 2" colour videotape
3	"Part Three"	24:47	6 April 1974	7.4	PAL 2" colour videotape
4	"Part Four"	24:50	13 April 1974	7.2	PAL 2" colour videotape
5	"Part Five"	23:56	20 April 1974	7.5	PAL 2" colour videotape
6	"Part Six"	23:48	27 April 1974	8.1	PAL 2" colour videotape

In The Television Companion (1998), David J. Howe and Stephen James Walker noted that the serial failed to be a fresh sequel to The Curse of Peladon because it simply carried many of the same characters and story points, and that it was also unlikely that some of the same characters would still appear fifty years later. They also wrote that the story "drags awfully," and, aside from the Ice Warriors, they criticised the supporting characters. In 2010, Mark Braxton of Radio Times said that there was a prevailing sense of déjà vu throughout The Monster of Peladon. While he noted that the story had its moments, he criticised the casting and felt that Pertwee and Sladen continued to lack rapport. John Sinnott in DVD Talk gave the serial three out of five stars, feeling that the shift in tone halfway through kept interest while the plot was similar and the subplots were repetitive.

== Commercial releases ==
=== In print ===
Doctor Who and the Monster of Peladon
- Author: Terrance Dicks
- Cover artist: Steve Kyte
- Series: Doctor Who book: Target novelisations
- Release number: 43
- Publisher: Target Books
- Publication date: 4 December 1980
- ISBN: 0-426-20132-9

A novelisation of this serial, written by Terrance Dicks, was published by Target Books in December 1980.

=== Home media ===
The serial was released on VHS on 27 December 1995. It was released on Audio CD with linking narration by Elisabeth Sladen, on 3 March 2008. The Monster of Peladon was released on DVD on 18 January 2010 in a boxset entitled 'Peladon Tales', along with The Curse of Peladon. This serial was also released as part of the Doctor Who DVD Files in Issue 125 on 16 October 2013.
