= Isle of Noss =

Small, previously inhabited island in the Shetland Islands, Scotland

Noss (Scots)

Location
- Isle of Noss shown within the Shetland Islands
- OS grid reference: HU544405
- Coordinates: 60.15°N 1.02°W

Name
- Name meaning: Old Norse for "nose"
- Old Norse name: Nos

Physical geography
- Island group: Shetland
- Area: 343 hectares (1.32 sq mi)
- Area rank: 81
- Highest elevation: 181 metres (594 ft)

Administration
- Council area: Shetland Islands
- Country: Scotland
- Sovereign state: United Kingdom

Demographics
- Population: 0

The Isle of Noss or Noss (Scots: Noss) is a small, previously inhabited island in Shetland, Scotland. Noss is separated from the island of Bressay by the narrow Noss Sound. It has been run as a sheep farm since 1900, and has been a national nature reserve since 1955.

Noss is popular for wildlife tourism, and is linked to Bressay by a seasonal ferry service, run by the wildlife wardens using an inflatable boat. The ferry service brings around 1700 to the island each year, whilst total annual visitor numbers are thought to be around 5000 once those visiting on private and commercial boats are included. Attractions on Noss include a visitor centre, the Pony Pund built to breed Shetland ponies, the Holm of Noss rock and the Noup cliff.

== Etymology ==
The name Noss comes from the Old Norse nǫs, meaning nose. The fact that the name given was nǫs and not nǫsøy (nose island) - as is the way most other islands of a similar size are named in Shetland - suggests that the island was originally a peninsula attached to the neighbouring Bressay, and that at some point between the arrival of the Vikings and the 16th century the isthmus joining it was washed away by the sea.

== History ==
Noss had a population of 20 in 1851 but has had no permanent inhabitants since 1939. The main focus of settlement on Noss was around the low lying west side of the island at Gungstie (Old Norse: a landing place). Gungstie was built in the 1670s and is currently used by the seasonal wildlife wardens. Another settlement at Setter, on the south east of the island was inhabited until the 1870s and now lies derelict. Among the few families living on Noss were the Booth family headed by Joseph Booth (1765–1847). Genealogical records indicate that he was occupied as a farmer and fish curer. Records show that he was resident on Noss as early as 1834. The cliffs of the Noup of Noss (also known as the 'Great Wall of Noss') were first climbed by Jo Moran in 1963.

== Flora and fauna ==
137 vascular plant species, 25 fungi and lichen species, 44 mosses and liverworts and 30 species of algae have been recorded at Noss. Two nationally scarce species of vascular plant, small adder's-tongue and northern knotgrass are found here, as is the nationally scarce lichen Lecanora straminea.

Noss was designated a national nature reserve in 1955, and is managed by NatureScot. The island is renowned for its seabird colonies and is one of the more accessible of the internationally important seabird colonies in the North Atlantic. The sandstone cliffs of Noss have weathered into a series of horizontal ledges making ideal breeding grounds for gannets, puffins, guillemots, shags, black-legged kittiwakes, razorbills, northern fulmars and great skuas.

The species profile has changed considerably over the last 100 years, with dramatic increases in some species and population crashes in others. Four new species have begun to breed here (gannet, fulmar, great skua and storm petrel), however a further six species that were formerly recorded (lesser black-backed gull, common gull, tree sparrow, Eurasian whimbrel, peregrine falcon and white-tailed eagle) no longer breed at Noss. In total 201 bird species have been recorded: in addition to the many seabirds several species of waders also breed here, including dunlin, common snipe, oystercatcher and ringed plover. Other breeding bird species include skylark, meadow pipit, rock pipit and wheatear.

Otters are also frequently seen around the island, and grey and common seals are seen in small numbers. In total ten species of cetacean have been seen in the seas off Noss, of which the most commonly recorded is the harbour porpoise.

== Conservation designations ==
Noss National Nature Reserve
- IUCN category IV (habitat/species management area)
- Interactive map of Noss National Nature Reserve
- Location: Shetland, Scotland
- Area: 313 ha (770 acres)
- Established: 1955
- Governing body: NatureScot
- Website: Noss National Nature Reserve

The national nature reserve is classified as a Category IV protected area by the International Union for Conservation of Nature. Noss also holds other designations for its important wildlife being designated as a both a Special Protection Area (SPA) and a Site of Special Scientific Interest (SSSI). The island has also been designated an Important Bird Area (IBA) by BirdLife International.

== Gallery ==
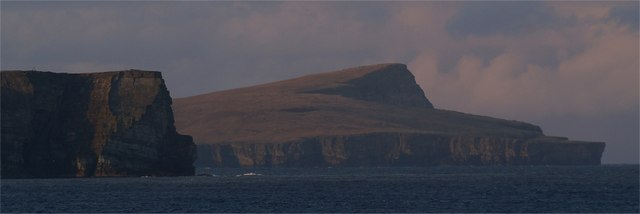
Noup of Noss and Noss Head

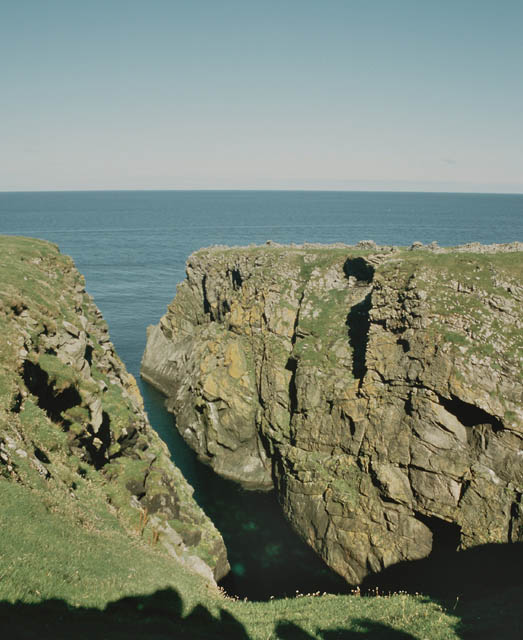
Pundsgeo

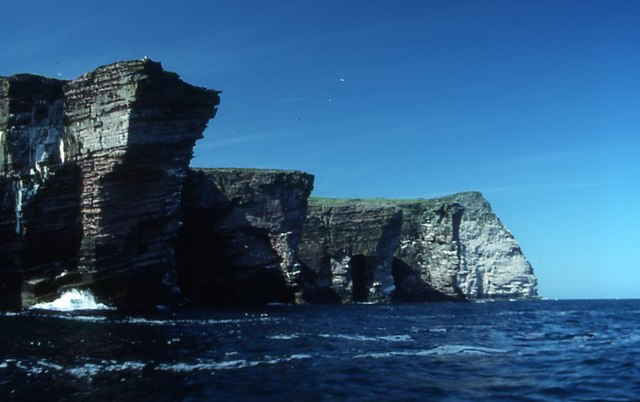

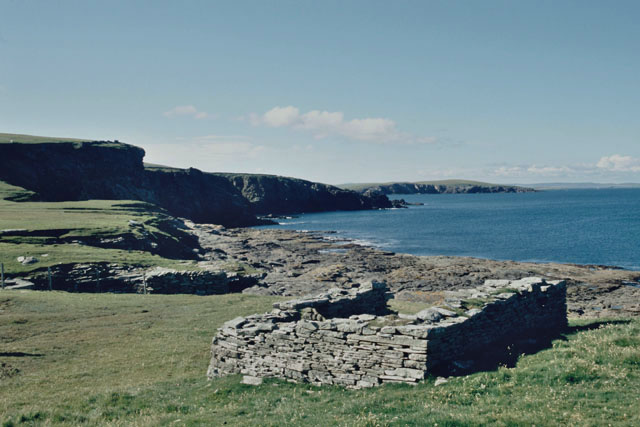

== See also ==
- List of islands of Scotland
