= Invasion of the Dinosaurs =

1974 Doctor Who television serial

071 – Invasion of the Dinosaurs
- Doctor Who serial
- The T-Rex appears in London. The model dinosaurs were poorly received, with many critics (and the producer) feeling that they let the story down.

Cast
- Doctor: Jon Pertwee – Third Doctor
- Companion: Elisabeth Sladen – Sarah Jane Smith
- Others: Nicholas Courtney – Brigadier Lethbridge-Stewart; Richard Franklin – Captain Mike Yates; John Levene – Sergeant Benton; Noel Johnson – Sir Charles Grover; Peter Miles – Professor Whitaker; Martin Jarvis – Butler; John Bennett – General Finch; Terence Wilton – Mark; Carmen Silvera – Ruth; Brian Badcoe – Adam; Ben Aris – Lieutenant Shears; Dave Carter – Sgt Duffy; Martin Taylor – Corporal Norton; George Bryson – Private Ogden; John Caesar – R/T Soldier; Pat Gorman – UNIT Corporal; Colin Bell – Private Bryson; Timothy Craven – Robinson; Trevor Lawrence – Lodge; Terry Walsh – Looter; Gordon Reid – Phillips; James Marcus – Peasant

Production
- Directed by: Paddy Russell
- Written by: Malcolm Hulke
- Script editor: Terrance Dicks; Robert Holmes, uncredited
- Produced by: Barry Letts
- Executive producer: None
- Music by: Dudley Simpson
- Production code: WWW
- Series: Season 11
- Running time: 6 episodes, 25 minutes each
- First broadcast: 12 January 1974
- Last broadcast: 16 February 1974

Chronology
← Preceded by The Time Warrior	Followed by → Death to the Daleks

Invasion of the Dinosaurs, simply titled Invasion in Part One, is the second serial of the 11th season of the British science fiction television series Doctor Who, which was first broadcast in six weekly parts on BBC1 from 12 January to 16 February 1974.

Set in London, the serial involves Member of Parliament (MP) Sir Charles Grover (Noel Johnson) and General Finch (John Bennett) conspiring to roll the Earth back in time to the "golden age" when it was untouched by humanity. This is the last story from the Pertwee era to contain an episode that was colourised from a black-and-white telerecording after the original colour version was irretrievably lost.

== Plot ==
The Doctor and Sarah Jane Smith return to 1974 to find London was evacuated following the sudden appearance and disappearance of dinosaurs. Finding the city under martial law by British troops, led by General Finch, the pair are initially arrested as possible looters, before Brigadier Lethbridge-Stewart intervenes on their behalf. Brought to UNIT's temporary operation centre within the city, the pair learn the situation began a few weeks ago, during their work against the Sontarans in the past; the Doctor voices suspicions someone is tampering with time, after he and Sarah encountered a confused medieval peasant during their arrest.

Conducting her own research into the matter, Sarah decides to track down a scientist, Professor Whitaker, who was researching time travel. Finding him operating within a bunker hidden inside a London Underground station, she is surprised to encounter Sir Charles Grover, a British MP who ordered the evacuation of London. When she insists upon seeing Whitaker, Grover knocks her out. After recovering, Sarah finds herself aboard a spaceship, crewed by environmentally conscious celebrities, led by two individuals: Mark and Ruth. The pair explain the group are travelling to a new Earth-like world to restart human civilisation that is close to nature, after Earth was heading for catastrophe. Sarah is not convinced, after she learns their warning came from a man she recognizes as Grover. Both Mark and Ruth decide to put her under a re-education machine to think like them, per Grover's instructions.

Meanwhile, the Doctor's investigations lead him to suspect someone has created a device called a Timescoop, which can bring objects to the present from another time period, and can also reverse time to effectively erase what happened. He and Lethbridge-Stewart soon realize Whitaker is behind the temporal phenomenon happening across London, alongside Grover - both men seek to create a new Golden Age on Earth, disgusted by the damage to the planet being caused by humanity's greed. The Doctor fears the Timescoop will be used to effectively erase human history, so the men can create a new civilisation attuned to nature, through a selection of humans they will shield form erasure. Before they can take action, the pair discover Yates is supporting the conspirators, as he has become disillusioned with humans following the trouble with the giant maggots in Wales a few months ago. The Doctor manages to subdue him, but Finch, also involved in the conspricacy, arrives to stop UNIT; fortunately, Benton manages to knock him out when he is distracted.

Sarah, managing to get free, convinces Mark and Ruth they are being lied to by Grover, revealing their spaceship is a fake residing in an underground bunker. The group soon go to find Grover, discovering him with Whitaker before the Timescoop. As the Doctor and Lethbridge-Stewart arrive to stop them, Whitaker turns on the device to begin erasing humanity. The Doctor manages to overcome its temporal effects to switch it off and sabotage it; Grover, unaware of this, tries to reactivate it, causing both himself, Whitaker, and the Timescoop to be sent into the past where they can do no further harm. Finch is court martialled for his involvement in Whitaker and Grover's scheme, while Yates is put on sick leave so he can be allowed to resign quietly. The Doctor, meanwhile, convinces Sarah to stay with him for further adventures.

== Production ==
Working titles for this story included Bridgehead from Space and Timescoop. The story title of the first episode was contracted to Invasion in the opening title sequence, in an attempt to conceal the central plot device of dinosaurs. However, this was undermined by the BBC listings magazine Radio Times, which carried a picture of a dinosaur in the listing for episode one.

Malcolm Hulke protested against the use of the title Invasion of the Dinosaurs, preferring the original working title of Timescoop, and felt the contraction for the first episode was silly, especially because the Radio Times gave the game away. In a response letter after transmission, script editor Terrance Dicks pointed out that all the titles used for the project had originated in the Doctor Who production office. He agreed that the contraction to Invasion was a decision he now regretted but noted that "Radio Times are a law unto themselves".

In the novelisation, adapted by Malcolm Hulke from his own scripts, no reference is made to the "Whomobile" (which was a prop contributed to the production at a late stage by actor Jon Pertwee). In the novel, the Doctor uses a military motorbike with electronic scanning equipment attached, as in the original scripts.

Locations used in London included Moorgate underground station, Smithfield Market, Westminster Bridge, Whitehall, Trafalgar Square, Haymarket, Covent Garden, Southall and Wimbledon Common. Location filming took place in September 1973, with studio recording commencing in October and November.

The series's producer, Barry Letts, was very disappointed with the realisation of the dinosaurs, and stated in a 2004 interview that this was the story he would most like to remake with modern technology.

Filming locations around London

Smithfield Market, Farringdon

Southall Gas Works

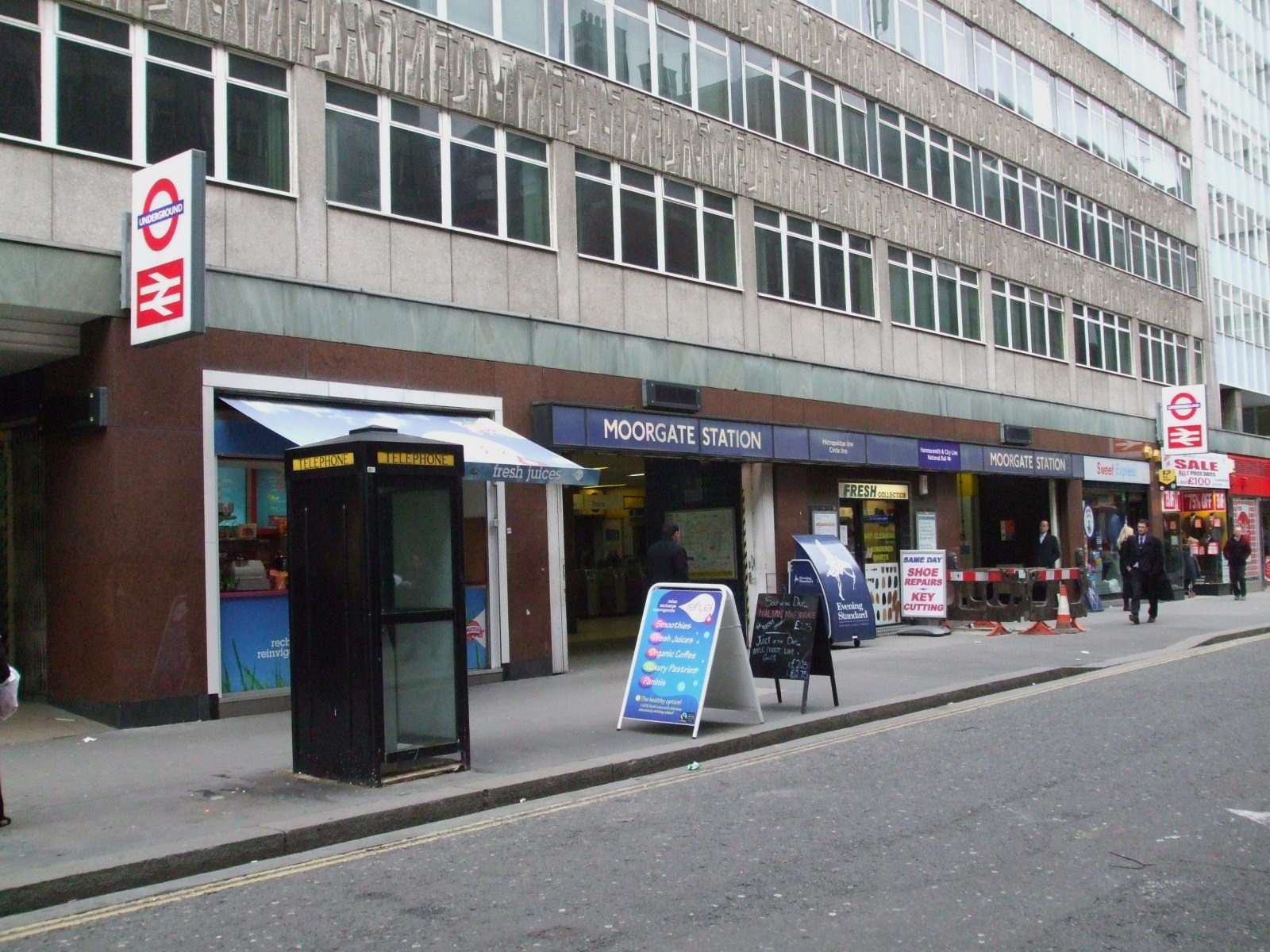
Moorgate underground station

=== Missing episodes and archive ===
All episodes of this story except Part One exist on original format PAL colour master tapes, with the first episode only existing as a monochrome 16mm film print, but has since been recolourised. It was returned to the BBC by Ian Levine in June 1983 after being retained by him for two years for use as a bargaining chip, in case another, more valuable, missing episode showed up. A short clip from the end of Episode One, depicting the Doctor and Sarah Jane in the back of a Land Rover to be taken to the detention centre when the Land Rover encounters a tyrannosaurus rex, still survives in its original 625-line format, having been used as reprise at the beginning of Episode Two.

There is a long-standing fan myth that the tape of Part One was erased by mistake, having been confused with an episode of the Patrick Troughton serial The Invasion. In fact, BBC Enterprises issued specific instructions to wipe all six episodes of Invasion of the Dinosaurs, named as such, in August 1974, just six months after the story's transmission; for reasons unknown, however, only Part One was actually wiped. Stickers on the cans for the remaining episodes 2–6 indicate that they were returned from BBC Wales, which was transmitting Season 11 in a different timeslot on Sunday. As far as the BBC was concerned, the story had been wiped in its entirety; researchers for the 1977 BBC documentary Whose Doctor Who found that none of the episodes were listed as existing in the BBC Film Library, despite the fact that episodes 2–6 were actually at the possession of the BBC engineering department (they would be merged together into the BBC Film and Videotape Library in 1978).

A black-and-white film print exists of the filmed sequences for Part One. This includes one scene of a scared scavenger stealing money from a dead milkman's satchel that was omitted from the broadcast version; this would have formed part of the deserted London montage. Black-and-white prints were used for practice by BBC film editors, in deciding where to make cuts, before cutting the master colour negatives. The surviving film recording of Episode 1 is the only tele-recording of a Season 11 episode held in the archives; this is probably due to the longstanding practice within BBC Enterprises of making a film print for overseas sales purposes prior to wiping any master tape. Colour 35mm film sequences from Part Five also exist, as does the initial edit of Part Three, without sound effects or incidental music on the soundtrack (known within the BBC as a "71 edit").

=== Cast notes ===
John Bennett later returned to Doctor Who as Li H'sen Chang in The Talons of Weng-Chiang (1977). Peter Miles also appeared in Doctor Who in other roles in Doctor Who and the Silurians (1970) and Genesis of the Daleks (1975), and in the radio serial Paradise of Death. Martin Jarvis had earlier appeared as Hilio in The Web Planet (1965) and later appeared as the Governor of Varos in Vengeance on Varos (1985). Carmen Silvera had previously appeared in The Celestial Toymaker (1966).

== Broadcast and reception ==
Episode	Title	Run time	Original release date	UK viewers (millions)	Archive
1	"Part One"(titled "Invasion")	25:29	12 January 1974	11.0	Chroma dot colour recovery and Manual recolourisation hybrid
2	"Part Two"	24:43	19 January 1974	10.1	PAL 2" colour videotape
3	"Part Three"	23:26	26 January 1974	11.0	PAL 2" colour videotape
4	"Part Four"	23:33	2 February 1974	9.0	PAL 2" colour videotape
5	"Part Five"	24:30	9 February 1974	9.0	PAL 2" colour videotape
6	"Part Six"	25:34	16 February 1974	7.5	PAL 2" colour videotape

After the episodes were broadcast, many younger viewers of the show complained that the Tyrannosaurus rex was actually an Allosaurus.

The story was repeated in 1999 on BBC Choice as part of a series of programmes themed around dinosaurs.

In The Discontinuity Guide (1995), Paul Cornell, Martin Day, and Keith Topping noted that "the special effects are woeful" and there was some padding, but the story "has many redeeming features, most notably the sombre location footage in the first episode". David J. Howe and Stephen James Walker, in their analysis in Doctor Who: The Television Companion, felt that unfortunately the "awfulness of the dinosaur scenes tends to overshadow the excellence of Paddy Russell's direction of the rest of the story and the high quality of the performances by the assembled cast". Though they were favourable towards the plot, they noted that "the story is poorly paced and contains a tremendous amount of padding".

In 2010, Mark Braxton of Radio Times awarded it three stars out of five, describing it as "a roaringly good script" and he also praised the casting, but he criticised the dinosaurs as "dire" and questioned the "grand plan" which "raises all sorts of questions about how the new, jump-suited generation of mankind was smuggled aboard the fake spaceship, or how a big, nuclear-generator-powered underground base could be built unnoticed". DVD Talk's John Sinnott gave the story four out of five stars. Aside from the dinosaurs, he felt that the rest was "very good" with "a good amount of suspense, some nice twists", and also highlighted how the villains were "people who basically had the right ideas but that they took it way too far". SFX reviewer Ian Berriman wrote that the serial was "crammed with unlikely plot turns ... but that just makes it all the more entertaining". He noted that it was problematic to have several cliffhangers rely on the appearance of the dinosaurs due to their poor realisation, but praised Sarah's competence and involvement with the plot.

== Commercial releases ==
=== In print ===
Doctor Who and the Dinosaur Invasion
- Author: Malcolm Hulke
- Cover artist: Chris Achilleos
- Series: Doctor Who book: Target novelisations
- Release number: 22
- Publisher: Target Books
- Publication date: 19 February 1976
- ISBN: 0-426-10874-4

A novelisation of this serial, written by Malcolm Hulke, was published by Target Books in February 1976 as Doctor Who and the Dinosaur Invasion. In 1993 it was reprinted with the title Doctor Who – Invasion of the Dinosaurs, and different cover art. The novelisation features a prologue about the dinosaurs and ends with the Doctor consulting the Book of Ezekiel to determine the final fate of the Golden Age time travellers. An unabridged reading of the novelisation by actor Martin Jarvis was released on CD in November 2007 by BBC Audiobooks.

=== Home media ===
This was the final complete story to be released by BBC Worldwide on VHS, in 2003.

The story was released on DVD in the UK on 9 January 2012 alongside the 1975 Tom Baker story The Android Invasion, together forming the U.N.I.T Files box set. The DVD features a restored black-and-white version of Episode 1 as the default and also a 'best-endeavours' attempt at colour recovery of this episode as a branched-extra feature. This serial was also released as part of the Doctor Who DVD Files in Issue 121 on 21 August 2013.

In contrast to other wiped colour episodes from the Pertwee era where the missing colour information had been inadvertently recorded on the surviving black and white film copies as a sequence of visual artefacts/dots or chroma dots, in the case of Part One of this story this information was found to be incomplete, and only the red and green colour signal information was recoverable, requiring the missing blue signal information to be obtained via other means.

The new colour version of Part One featured on the DVD thus employs approximated blue colour information, and although the outcome is not up to normal DVD quality, it gives an impression of what the episode would have looked like when originally broadcast.
