= Ralph Watson =

British actor (1936–2021)

- Born: Ralph Ramsey Watson; 20 January 1936; Newcastle upon Tyne, Northumberland, England
- Died: 20 June 2021 (aged 85)
- Occupation: Actor
- Children: 2

Ralph Ramsey Watson (20 January 1936 – 20 June 2021) was a British actor. His TV credits include Z-Cars, Dixon of Dock Green, Doctor Who (in the serials The Underwater Menace, The Web of Fear, The Monster of Peladon and Horror of Fang Rock), Porridge, Auf Wiedersehen, Pet, The Bill, Agatha Christie's Poirot and Casualty. He died in June 2021 at the age of 85.

== Filmography ==
Year	Title	Role	Notes
1968-1977	Doctor Who	Captain Knight/Ettis/Ben	The Underwater Menace (Ep 4), The Web of Fear (Ep 1-4), The Monster of Peladon (Ep 1-4), Horror of Fang Rock (Ep 1)
1968	The Anniversary	Construction Worker	
1971	Dixon of Dock Green	Cyril	Episode: The Fighter
1975	Edward the Seventh	Dr. Watson	Miniseries
1975	Get Some In!	Corporal Potts	Episode: Call-Up
1980	McVicar	PO Allen	
1983	Auf Wiedersehen, Pet	Waiter	Episode: The Girls They Left Behind
1984-1994	The Bill	Various Roles	6 episodes
1991	Agatha Christie's Poirot	Danvers	Episode: The Tragedy at Marsdon Manor
1997	Shooting Fish	Vigilante 1	
1998	Wycliffe	John Combes	Episode: Standing Stone
2007	Casualty	Reg Beamish	Episode: Lost in the Rough
