= Flannan Isle =

Poem by Wilfrid Wilson Gibson

"Flannan Isle" is a poem by Wilfrid Wilson Gibson, first published in 1912. It refers to a mysterious incident that occurred on the Flannan Isles in 1900, when three lighthouse-keepers disappeared without explanation.

== Text ==
The poem begins:

"Though three men dwell on Flannan Isle
To keep the lamp alight,
As we steer'd under the lee, we caught
No glimmer through the night."

A passing ship at dawn had brought
The news; and quickly we set sail,
To find out what strange thing might ail
The keepers of the deep-sea light.

— Stanzas 1-2

The remaining stanzas record the increasing tension of the relief party as they search the lighthouse and island, finding no sign of life but three strange birds that plunge from sight. At the ending, conscious of Flannan Isle's history of unexplained tragedies:

We seem'd to stand for an endless while,
Though still no word was said,
Three men alive on Flannan Isle,
Who thought on three men dead."

— Stanza 13

== In popular culture ==
The poem "Flannan Isle" is quoted by Tom Baker as the Doctor at the end of the Doctor Who story Horror of Fang Rock, which was set on a lighthouse and involved an alien explanation for the tragedy that befell the three keepers there and survivors of a shipwreck.

For the 1994 album Chansons des mers froides (Songs from the Cold Seas), French producer Hector Zazou adapted an extract of the poem "Flannan Isle" as a song entitled "The Lighthouse". Lead vocals were performed by Siouxsie Sioux of Siouxsie and the Banshees, and backing vocals were provided by a female Nanai shaman.

The novel Some Strange Scent of Death by Angela J. Elliott takes its name from a line in the poem and tells of the disappearance of the lighthouse keepers.
