= Breasclete =

Village in the Outer Hebrides, Scotland

Coordinates: 58°13′06″N 6°44′35″W

Breasclete: Scottish Gaelic: Brèascleit
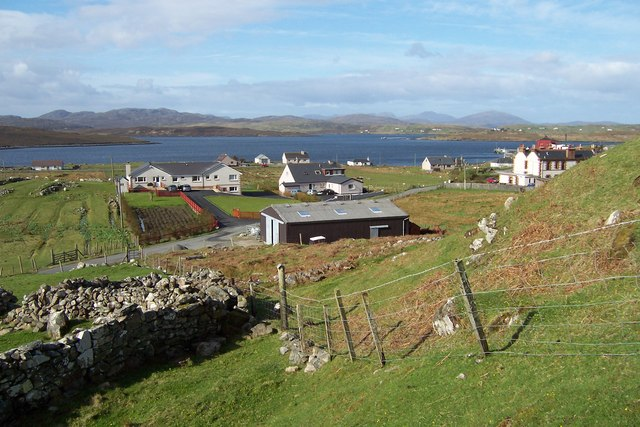
- Looking south west over Loch Roag towards the Uig Hills

- Location within the Outer Hebrides
- Language: Scottish Gaelic; English
- OS grid reference: NB217353
- Civil parish: Uig
- Council area: Na h-Eileanan Siar
- Lieutenancy area: Western Isles
- Country: Scotland
- Sovereign state: United Kingdom
- Post town: ISLE OF LEWIS
- Postcode district: HS2
- Dialling code: 01851
- Police: Scotland
- Fire: Scottish
- Ambulance: Scottish
- UK Parliament: Na h-Eileanan an Iar
- Scottish Parliament: Na h-Eileanan an Iar
- Website: breasclete.com

Breasclete (Scottish Gaelic: Brèascleit) is a village and community on the west side of the Isle of Lewis, in the Outer Hebrides, Scotland. Breasclete is within the parish of Uig, and is situated adjacent to the A858.

== History ==
Breasclete has several stone circles, as well as various cairns. The Bronze Age-era Olcote kerbed cairn, south of the settlement, was excavated in 1995 during road works, by CFA Archaeology, and the site seems to form part of a wider ceremonial complex. The cairn contained a cist burial and the archaeologists believe there was a satellite cist burial on the outside of the cairn but due to the acidity of the soil no bones survived to confirm this. The local pier, situated west of the settlement, was built in the early 20th century, and has a quay of similar construction.

== Community ==
One of the main services in the village is Breasclete Primary School, which has a current total of 27 children. There is a thriving community with the new Hall as the base for a number of community groups and organisations.

== Economy ==
The village also hosts the Equatec facility, a pharmaceutical facility dedicated to fatty acid research and production, which has now been taken over by German giant BASF in June 2012.

Other businesses located in the area include Scottish Fish Farm who have a number of sites in East Loch Roag, and Hebridean Soap who operate from their base in Breasclete.

Traditional industries like Harris Tweed also offer employment, and crofting is at the heart of the community.
