= Richard Dufallo =

American musician (1933–2000)

- Born: January 30, 1933; Whiting, Indiana
- Died: June 16, 2000 (aged 67); Denton, Texas

Richard John Dufallo (30 January 1933 in Whiting, Indiana – 16 June 2000 in Denton, Texas) was an American clarinetist, author, and conductor with a broad repertory. He is most known for his interpretations of contemporary music. During the 1970s, he directed contemporary music series at both Juilliard and the Aspen Music Festival, where he succeeded Darius Milhaud as artistic director of the Conference on Contemporary Music. He was influential at getting American works accepted in Europe, and gave the first European performances of works by Charles Ives, Carl Ruggles, Jacob Druckman, and Elliott Carter as well as younger composers like Robert Beaser. Dufallo, as conductor, also premiered numerous works by European composers, including Karlheinz Stockhausen, Sir Peter Maxwell Davies, and Krzystof Penderecki. He was a former assistant conductor of the New York Philharmonic, and worked closely with Leonard Bernstein from 1965 to 1975. He also served as associate conductor of the Buffalo Philharmonic. His 1989 book Trackings: Composers Speak with Richard Dufallo (Oxford University Press, ISBN 0-19-505816-X) features his interviews with 26 composers along with detailed autobiographical material about his own career in music.

== Early years ==
From 1950 to 1953, Dufallo studied clarinet at the American Conservatory of Music in Chicago. He later studied with the composer and conductor Lukas Foss at the University of California, Los Angeles where he earned his bachelor's and master's degrees. Foss became an important mentor and invited Dufallo to become the clarinetist in his Improvisation Chamber Ensemble. Dufallo was an associate conductor at the Buffalo Philharmonic in the mid-1960s during Mr. Foss's tenure as music director there.

== Family ==
Dufallo married Zaidee Parkinson (an American pianist, b. 1937) on October 15, 1966, and they divorced in 1985. They had two children, Basil (a professor at the University of Michigan) and Cornelius (an internationally acclaimed violinist and composer). He married Pamela Mia Paul on June 19, 1988. Paul is an American concert pianist, a Steinway Artist, and a Regents Professor at the University of North Texas College of Music. Dufallo also had a daughter, Rene Kirby of Los Angeles, and a sister, Kathryn Traczyk, who lives in Indiana.
