= Alan Bennion =

British actor

- Born: Alan John Bennion; 18 April 1930; Northwich, Cheshire, England
- Died: 27 July 2018 (aged 88); Brighton, England
- Occupation: actor

Alan Bennion (18 April 1930 – 27 July 2018) was a British actor. He was best known for his work on the science fiction television series Doctor Who and the police drama Z-Cars. He made a total of five appearances on Z-Cars, and appeared in the Doctor Who serials The Seeds of Death, The Curse of Peladon and The Monster of Peladon, each time playing a different "Ice Lord".

He also appeared in a 1971 production of Hamlet with Sir Ian McKellen and Tim Pigott-Smith.

== Filmography ==
Year	Title	Role	Notes
1968	Carry On Up the Khyber	Burpha	Uncredited
1973	Psychomania	Constable #1	
1986	God's Outlaw	Archdeacon Bell	
1992	B & B	Councillor	
