= Reverse: 1999 =

2023 video game

- Created by: Bluepoch
- Video game

Reverse: 1999
- Developer: Bluepoch
- Publisher: Bluepoch
- Genre: Role-playing, turn-based tactics
- Platform: iOS; Android; Windows; HarmonyOS
- Released: CN: May 31, 2023; WW: October 26, 2023
- Original net animation

1999! Arcane Incident Department
- Released: August 2, 2026 – September 11, 2026
- Episodes: 8

Reverse: 1999 (Note: Chinese: 重返未来：1999; pinyin: Chóngfǎn Wèilái: Yījiǔjiǔjiǔ; lit. 'Return to the Future: 1999') is a turn-based tactical role-playing video game developed and published by Bluepoch. The game has been available in Mainland China since May 2023 and was released globally on October 26, 2023.

== Story ==
The game takes place in an alternate history where humans exist alongside Arcanists, a race of individuals with magical abilities. On the last day of the year 1999, a mysterious phenomenon known as the "Storm" began to rewind time to eras across the 20th Century. The story depicts the conflict between two factions: the St. Pavlov Foundation, an organization of (mostly) Humans and Arcanists dedicated to serving humanity and attempting to end the Storm, and Manus Vindictae, an Arcanist-supremacist group that acts as the story's antagonist faction.

The protagonist is Vertin, an arcanist called the Timekeeper. She is a member of the St. Pavlov Foundation and the only person known to be naturally immune to the Storm's effects. Vertin is tasked with investigating the Storm to discover ways of stopping it.

== Gameplay ==
A battle in Reverse: 1999 showcasing its turn-based combat system with card-based gameplay

Reverse: 1999 is a strategy role-playing video game with turn-based battles and combat designed around card-shuffling mechanics. Players select up to four Arcanists that they own to take into battle with them. The Arcanists each have unique passive skills, two Incantation cards, and one Ultimate card that they can use in battle. In addition, players can equip and build each Arcanist with a "Psychube" for additional benefits or upgrade their "Resonance" to improve certain statistics.

Once in battle, the player will start with a hand of 7–8 Incantation cards to choose from, and can play as many cards in a turn as there are active friendly Arcanists on the field. Once their turn is done and both sides have played their cards, the player gains extra cards at random from their Arcanists' combined deck. Each card ranges from one to three star-level, and players can upgrade incantations by merging the same cards together, increasing the damage they do, the amount of "Moxie" the respective Arcanist gains from their use, and sometimes unlocking extra effects. When a character gains enough Moxie, they will automatically be granted an opportunity to unleash their Ultimate skill. This applies to enemy units as well.

Outside of combat, players have a chance to build their own "Wilderness," an island within Vertin's suitcase made up of hexagonal pieces taken from various sets. Here, players can gain a small amount of free base level-up resources, as well as customize the Wilderness to their liking, limited only by the sets that they have unlocked for placement and a certain maximum number of tiles.

== Development ==
The game's first beta test began on January 7, 2022, and the second began on June 10, 2022. The game started a third beta test on April 14. The game was released in Mainland China on May 31, 2023.

The Official Global Reveal Trailer was released on July 21, 2023. The global version beta test ran from August 4 to 13, 2023, and was released globally on October 26, 2023.

== Reception ==
Reverse: 1999 has received generally favorable reviews and has been praised for its voice acting, character design, and artstyle. The game's story has been criticized for being awkward and complicated; reviewing the game's beta, Pocket Tactics said "the way it presents its story is absolutely baffling".

On October 17, 2023, Reverse: 1999 surpassed 1 million pre-registrations prior to its global release. After release, it reached a global player count of 19.99 million players in 2026.

In the first month after its global launch, Reverse: 1999 earned approximately $4.5 million USD in net revenue. One year after its global launch, Reverse: 1999 had earned $98.7 million USD in gross mobile revenue.

== Accolades ==
Year	Award	Category	Results	References
2023	Weibo Game Awards	Weibo Annual Outstanding New Game	Won	
2023	TapTap Annual Game Awards	Professional Category Best Visual Award	Won	
2023	TapTap Annual Game Awards	"The One in My Heart" Award (Character "Druvis III")	Won	
2024	GMA Global Music Awards	Pop Music Bronze Award (Winning Song: "Symbiosis")	Won	
2024	GMA Global Music Awards	Bronze Award for Game Music (Winning song: "Unexpected Storm")	Won	

== Other media ==
=== Donghua ===
On April 18, 2026, a donghua series titled 1999! Arcane Incident Department was announced to be in production by the game's official social media accounts. It was set to premiere on August 2. The first two episodes were released a day early on August 1, 2026 at 9:00 pm UTC.

==== Episodes ====
No.	Title	Original release date
1	"Me? Department Head?!"	August 1, 2026
Marcus is kidnapped by Medicine Pocket and taken deep into the bowels of the Laplace Scientific Computing Center, past several different Arcanists. Upon their arrival in a conference room, Lucy informs Marcus that she has been invited to become the head of the LSCC's new Arcane Incident Department.
2	"Eccentricity Investigation!"	August 1, 2026
Marcus first task from Lucy is to take a special crystal ball and convince others to touch it to record their behavioral logic data. After accidentally knocking down Medicine Pocket, Marcus runs away from them while the crystal ball takes its own journey through the LSCC, inadvertently helping Marcus complete her job.
3	"yretsyM ssalgruoH ehT"	August 7, 2026
Marcus, Vertin, and Sonneto are attempting to contain an arcane hourglass, but the hourglass is able to change the laws of physics around itself, making it difficult to contain, even with the team's arcane skills.
4	"A Resignation Letter to Lucy, Lucy, and...Lucy?!"	August 14, 2026
Marcus attempts to hand in her resignation letter to Lucy, only to find several robotic clones of her throughout the LSCC going haywire. After accidentally setting off a chain of explosions, Marcus learns from the real Lucy why she was chosen for her current role.
5	"HEY! YOU! TURN IT! OFF!!"	August 21, 2026
Regulus opens a box containing a platinum record, only to find that the record itself has become a sentient Awakened object and tore through the bottom of the box. The record leads her on a chase through the LSCC as she tries to recover both the record and the valuables it stole.
6	"Incident Department vs. Incident Machine"	August 28, 2026
After having their latest funding request rejected, Medicine Pocket sticks their head into the hole of a strange device and finds they can't get out. Out of spite, they lure in multiple other researchers to stick their heads in the same space, including X, Ulrich, Name Day, and Enigma. When Marcus stumbles across the trapped researchers, her attempts to free them results in the device rolling through the LSCC until it smashes into Lucy's office.
7	"Panic! At the Theater"	September 4, 2026
A team consisting of Marcus, Vertin, Sonneto, and Regulus is dispatched to investigate a supposedly haunted theater. Vertin quickly uncovers that the "ghost" haunting the theater is actually a small group of critters, who tell Sonneto they'll vacate the premises if the girls beat them in a dance-off competition. But with none of the Arcanists being particularly skilled dancers, things look bleak, until the actual ghosts of long-dead dancers intervene.
8	"An Eccentric Graduation"	September 11, 2026
Marcus submits her report on the eccentricities of the Arcane Incident Department members to Lucy. However, she accidentally puts them in the wrong inbox, convincing Lucy that everyone involved should be terminated. Marcus stumbles into the lab where the "Personality Fixer" has activated and sucks in everyone involved, while Lucy is indifferent to Marcus' pleas for mercy. As the entire group is sucked inside the device, Marcus spots Mathilda's crystal ball and uses it to overload the device, turning everyone back to normal. Later, the real Lucy returns from vacation, actually reading the report that Marcus submitted, realizing what her copy did in her absence and that she too has similar eccentricities.
