= Flannan Isles =

Islands in the Outer Hebrides, Scotland

Na h-Eileanan Flannach (Gaelic)
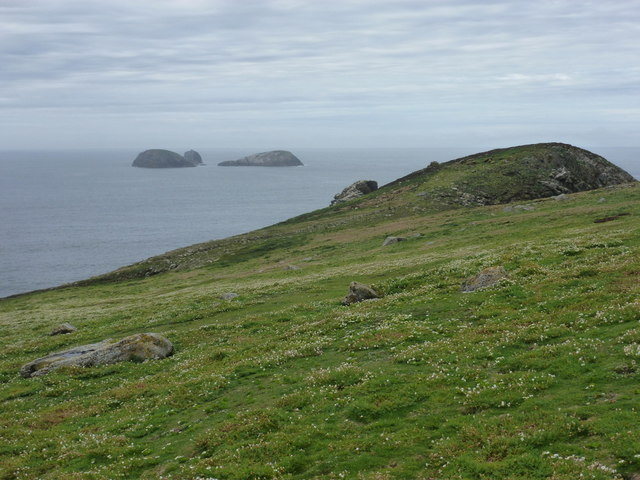

Location
- Flannan Isles shown within the Outer Hebrides
- OS grid reference: NA720460
- Coordinates: 58.3°N 7.6°W

Name
- Gaelic pronunciation: [nə ˈhelanən ˈfl̪ˠan̪ˠəx]
- Name meaning: Flannan Isles

Physical geography
- Island group: Lewis and Harris
- Area: 58.87 ha (145 1/2 acres) over more than seven islands.
- Area rank: Eilean Mòr is 325th
- Highest elevation: 88 m (289 ft), on Eilean Mòr

Administration
- Council area: Na h-Eileanan Siar
- Country: Scotland
- Sovereign state: United Kingdom

Demographics
- Population: 0
- Largest settlement: Flannan Isles Lighthouse is the only habitable structure

The Flannan Isles (Scottish Gaelic: Na h-Eileanan Flannach) or the Seven Hunters are a small island group in the Outer Hebrides of Scotland, approximately 32 kilometres (17 1/2 nautical miles) west of the Isle of Lewis. They may take their name from Saint Flannan, the 7th century Irish preacher and abbot.

The islands have been devoid of permanent residents since the automation of Flannan Isles Lighthouse in 1971.

== Geography ==
The islands are split into three groups: the main cluster of rocks that lie to the northeast include the two principal islands of Eilean Mòr (Big Isle), which is approximately 17.5 hectares (43 acres) in extent, and Eilean Taighe (House Isle). To the south lie Soray/Soraigh (Old Norse Suðurey, south island or Sauðurey, sheep's island) and Sgeir Tomain (probably from Old Norse sker, skerry, shallow rock in sea, and Gaelic tuaman, grave or mound); while the main western outcrops are Eilean a' Ghobha (Isle of the Blacksmith), Roaireim (which has a natural rock arch), and Bròna Cleit (Sad Sunk Rock). The total land area amounts to approximately 50 hectares (125 acres) and the highest point is 88 metres (289 ft) above sea level on Eilean Mòr.

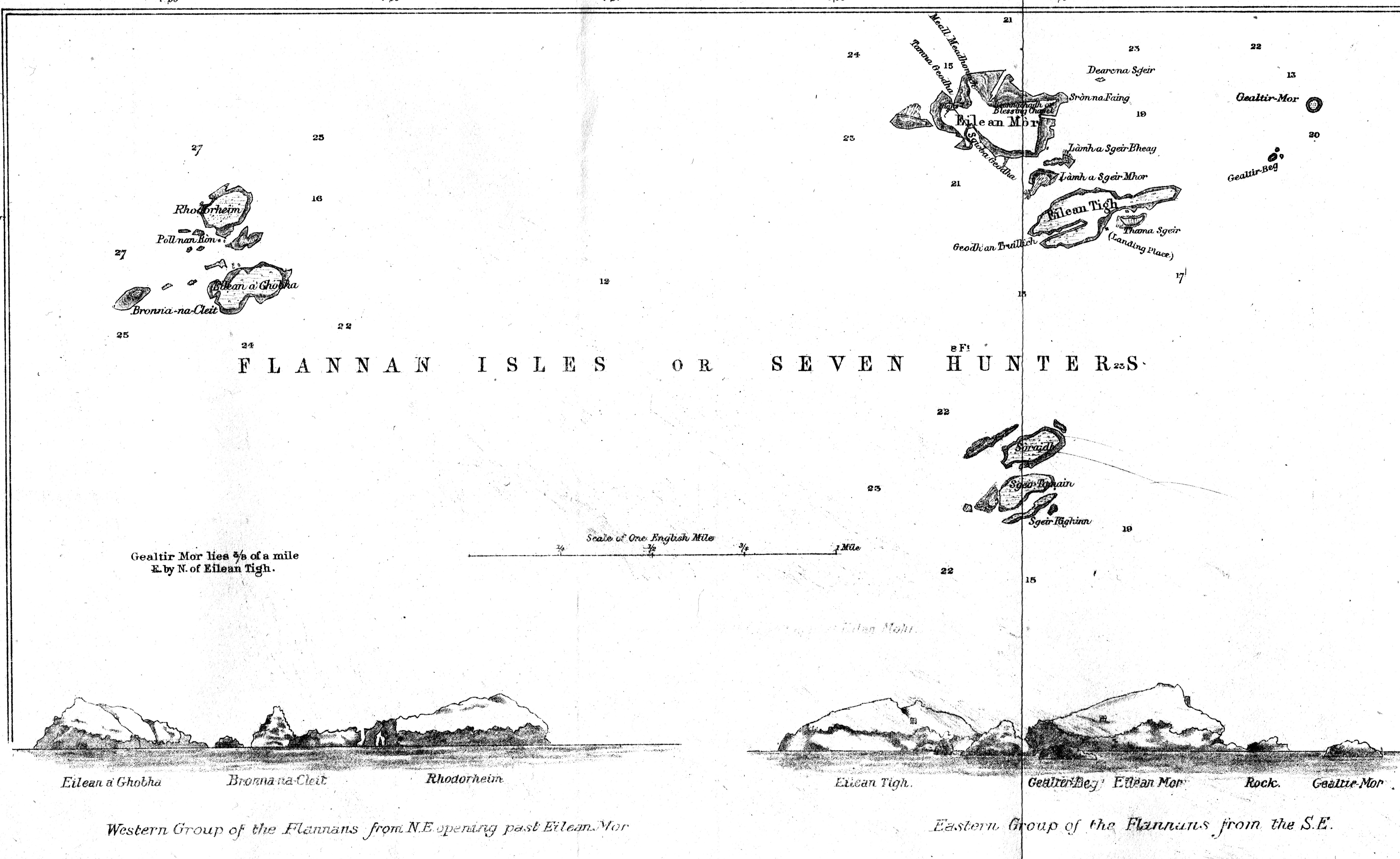
The Flannan or Seven Hunters Isles

The geology consists of a dark breccia of gabbros and dolerites intruding Archaean gneiss. In prehistoric times, the area was covered by ice sheets that spread from Scotland out into the Atlantic Ocean. After the last retreat of the ice circa 20,000 years BP, sea levels were as much as 122 metres (400 ft) lower than at present and it is likely that the existing islands were part of a much larger land mass, although still separated from the Outer Hebrides by many miles of open water. Steadily rising sea levels thereafter would have reduced the land remaining above sea level to its present extent.

There are two possible landing places for boats visiting Eilean Mòr to the east and west, although this may be hazardous given the regular heavy swells.

== History ==
As the name implies, Eilean Taighe hosts a ruined stone shelter. Eilean Mòr is home to the lighthouse and a ruined chapel dedicated to Saint Flannán, which the lighthouse keepers referred to as the "dog kennel" because of its small size. These ruined bothies were described collectively by the Ancient Monuments Commission as The Bothies of the Clan McPhail, or Bothain Chlann ‘ic Phaill.

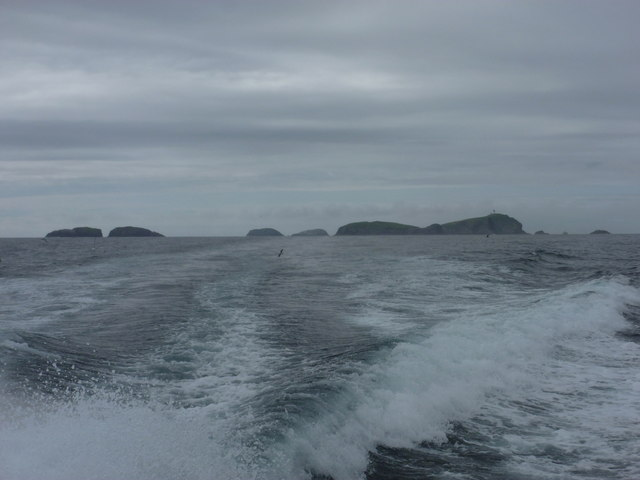
A view of all the islands.

It is not entirely clear to which St Flannan the chapel pays honours. It is likely that the honoree was either the 7th-century Abbot of Killaloe, County Clare, Ireland, or alternatively, the half brother of the eighth century St Ronan, who gave his name to the nearby island of North Rona. There was also a certain Flann, son of an Abbot of Iona, called Maol-duine, who died in 890 and may also have lent his name to these isolated isles.

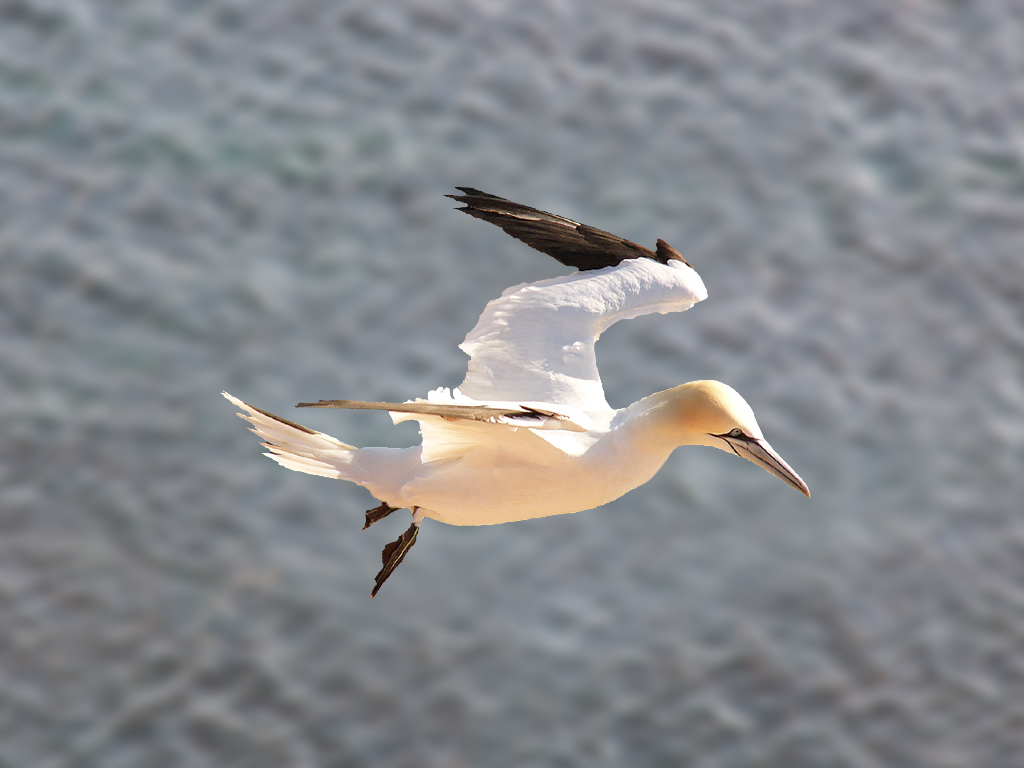
Northern gannet (Morus bassanus) in flight

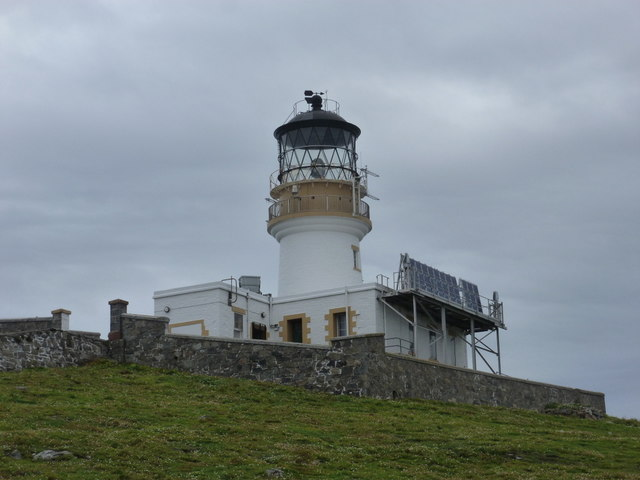
The lighthouse.

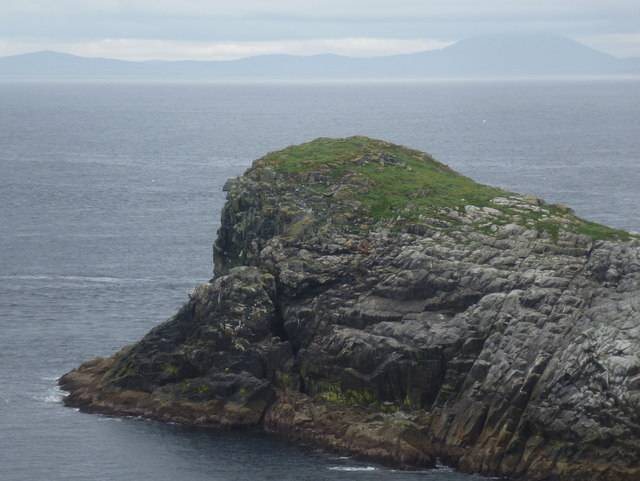
View over Eilean Tighe towards Lewis.

The archipelago is also known as The Seven Hunters. During the Middle Ages, they also may have been called the Seven Haley (Holy) Isles. Martin Martin (1703) lists a number of unusual customs associated with regular pilgrimages to Eilean Mòr, such as removing one's hat and making a sunwise turn when reaching the plateau.

== Wildlife ==
The isles provide nesting for a population of seabirds, including Atlantic puffins, northern fulmars, European storm-petrels, Leach's petrels, common shag, and black-legged kittiwakes. There is a gannetry on Roaireim. From the late Middle Ages on, Lewismen regularly raided these nests for eggs, birds, and feathers. There is a population of rabbits, brought to the islands by the lighthouse keepers, and crofters from Bernera graze sheep on the most fertile islands. Minke and pilot whales, as well as Risso's and other species of dolphin, are commonly observed in the vicinity.

The islands became a Site of Special Scientific Interest in December 1983.

The archipelago has been designated an Important Bird Area (IBA) by BirdLife International because it supports breeding populations of several species of seabirds. For the same reason the islands have been designated a Special Protection Area (SPA).

== Lighthouse crew disappearance ==
In December 1900, all three lighthouse keepers vanished in mysterious circumstances. An official inquiry concluded that the three men had probably been swept away and lost at sea in rough weather while attending some equipment near the cliff edge.

== In fiction ==
The Flannan Isles are the main setting in Robert W. Sneddons's short story On the Isle of Blue Men which was first published in Ghost Stories magazine in April 1927. The Scottish-American author's "atmospheric, Lovecraftian thriller" was reissued by Charles G. Waugh with an alternate ending based on an older story by Sneddon in the Lighthouse Horrors anthology in 1993. Neil Gunn's epic novel The Silver Darlings published in 1941 describes a visit to the islands. Eilean Mòr in particular also features prominently as the location of a murder central to the plot of Coffin Road, a 2016 novel by Peter May.

The Vanishing, a 2019 film starring Gerard Butler and Peter Mullan, is set on the isles and inspired by the infamous disappearances.

The game Reverse: 1999 has a character named Marcus whose story revolves around writing novels about the three men’s disappearance while they communicate as ghosts.

== See also ==
- List of islands of Scotland
