= The Faceless Ones =

035 – The Faceless Ones
- Doctor Who serial

Cast
- Doctor: Patrick Troughton – Second Doctor
- Companions: Anneke Wills – Polly; Michael Craze – Ben Jackson; Frazer Hines – Jamie McCrimmon
- Others: Colin Gordon – Commandant; Donald Pickering – Blade; Wanda Ventham – Jean Rock; Pauline Collins – Samantha Briggs; Bernard Kay – Inspector Crossland; George Selway – Meadows; Gilly Fraser – Ann Davidson; Victor Winding – Spencer; Christopher Tranchell – Jenkins; Peter Whitaker – Inspector Gascoigne; Barry Wilsher – Heslington; Madalena Nicol – Nurse Pinto; Leonard Trolley – Supt. Reynolds; James Appleby – Policeman; Brigit Paul – Announcer; Michael Ladkin – R.A.F. Pilot

Production
- Directed by: Gerry Mill
- Written by: David Ellis and Malcolm Hulke
- Script editor: Gerry Davis
- Produced by: Innes Lloyd; Peter Bryant (associate producer, episodes 1–3)
- Music by: None (Note: "Pacific Dawn" by Tom Dissevelt was used as stock music, along with "Hindu Funeral Drumming" and "Nigerian Drums" from the BBC Sound Library)
- Production code: KK
- Series: Season 4
- Running time: 6 episodes, 25 minutes each
- Episode(s) missing: 4 episodes (2, 4–6)
- First broadcast: 8 April 1967
- Last broadcast: 13 May 1967

Chronology
← Preceded by The Macra Terror	Followed by → The Evil of the Daleks

The Faceless Ones is the mostly missing eighth serial of the fourth season of the British science fiction television series Doctor Who, which was first broadcast in six weekly parts from 8 April to 13 May 1967.

In this serial, the Second Doctor (Patrick Troughton) and his travelling companions Jamie (Frazer Hines), Ben (Michael Craze) and Polly (Anneke Wills) arrive at Gatwick Airport where identity-stealing aliens known as the Chameleons have taken refuge after their planet was destroyed, preying on university students by abducting them using the false holiday flight organisation 'Chameleon Tours'. It sees the departure of Craze and Wills as Ben and Polly. Only two of the six episodes are held in the BBC archives; four remain missing.

An animated version of the serial from BBC Studios was released on 16 March 2020. It became the eighth incomplete Doctor Who serial to receive full-length animated reconstructions of its missing episodes.

== Plot ==
The TARDIS materializes on the runway of Gatwick Airport. When a police officer chases them, the Second Doctor, Ben, Polly and Jamie split up. Airport authorities remove the TARDIS. Polly hides in the Chameleon Tours agency's hangar. She sees Spencer shoot Inspector Gascoigne. Spencer walks through a hidden door and uses a video call to speak with Captain Blade. Polly runs away, finds the Doctor and Jamie, and tells them about the murder. The Doctor notices Gascoigne was electrocuted, so the weapon was a raygun. That kind has not been invented yet on Earth. The three plan to tell authorities about the murder. While they walk toward the main building, Spencer takes Polly without the others noticing. The Doctor and Jamie ask Jenkins where to find a police officer. Jenkins suspects they are involved with the police box on the runway, so he calls the Airport Commandant. Ben is caught wandering around by Spencer. He pretends it is his first day on the job, and he got lost. The Doctor and Jamie see a woman just like Polly, but she does not know them. Blade and Spencer bring Gascoigne to a medical centre. He is severely burned but alive.

Nurse Pinto brings in the unconscious air traffic controller Meadows to replace him with an alien doppelgänger. The Doctor and Jamie meet Samantha Briggs, who is searching for her brother who disappeared on a Chameleon youth tour. Ben finds Polly suspended comatose in a cabinet, before being caught and frozen. The Doctor and his friends meet DI Crossland, who is also investigating Chameleon Tours. The Doctor realises that the murder was that of Crossland's missing partner, Gascoigne, and convinces the Airport Commandant to allow them to investigate. In the hangar, Samantha and Jamie find fake postcards from missing tourists. Blade captures Crossland.

Spencer captures Samantha. Jamie boards a plane. When an airsick Jamie emerges from the toilet, he finds the passengers miniaturised by Blade's assistant Ann, who catches him. Meanwhile, the Doctor captures Meadows' double. He threatens to remove "Meadows'" life-supporting armband, who then explains that an explosion ruined the aliens' home world. They therefore intend to use comatose humans in orbit to sustain themselves. The Doctor and Meadows' doppelgänger rescue the real Pinto, causing her double to disintegrate. Pinto frees Samantha, while Jamie meets the Director of the aliens, disguised as Crossland, and is replicated.

The Doctor and Pinto board the last flight to space, but Blade sends Chameleons to capture them. The Doctor offers to spare the aliens, in exchange for returning the humans. One alien disintegrates, proving that Samantha found the real staff in the car park, as Blade and Spencer rebel by killing the Director and Chameleon Jamie. The originals revive and Crossland stays behind longer, while the Doctor, Jamie and Pinto return with freed humans.

Back at the airport, Ben and Polly learn that the day is 20 July 1966, when they first left in the TARDIS. They leave for home, as the Doctor reveals that the TARDIS has been stolen.

== Production ==
David Ellis and Malcolm Hulke had both been attempting to write Doctor Who properties (since the programme's beginning in Hulke's case), including a rejected joint effort in 1966. Instead, script editor Gerry Davis tasked the team with a story with a scientific concept and menace, as well as a singular set such as a department store. Hulke and Ellis created a storyline called The Big Store in which the Chameleons took the form of mannequins. Producer Innes Lloyd suggested the setting change to an airport instead and be a six-part story instead of four. The story was officially commissioned as Dr Who & The Chameleons on 3 January 1967. A storyline for the first four episodes was submitted 7 January. Scripts were delivered from 24 to 31 January.

Some of The Faceless Ones was filmed on location at Gatwick Airport in March 1967. Heathrow also accepted the production team's offer, but the team chose Gatwick as the cost was lower. Doctor Who would later film at Heathrow for Time-Flight in 1982.

As The Macra Terror saw the debut of a new title sequence, The Faceless Ones saw the minor revision of the theme music that accompanied this new sequence introduced in Episode 2.

=== Cast notes ===
Both Michael Craze and Anneke Wills were released from their contracts after episode 2, leading to their departures during this serial. Their contracts originally ran out in episode two of the next serial, and they were compensated for this. The characters appear in episode 6 in scenes shot on location prior to the studio recording. Meanwhile, Frazer Hines was contracted through The Faceless Ones and the following serial, The Evil of the Daleks.

Pauline Collins was offered the chance to continue playing the character of Sam Briggs as a new companion, but she declined the offer. The character was originally named Cleopatra Briggs. Collins guest-starred, years later, as Queen Victoria in "Tooth and Claw" (2006).

Bernard Kay appears as Inspector Crossland. He had previously appeared as Tyler in The Dalek Invasion of Earth (1964) and Saladin in The Crusade (1965), then later appeared as Caldwell in Colony in Space (1971). Donald Pickering and Wanda Ventham would later star as husband and wife in Time and the Rani (1987). Pickering had previously appeared as Eyesen in The Keys of Marinus (1964) and Ventham would go on to play Thea Ransom in Image of the Fendahl (1977). Christopher Tranchell previously appeared as Roger Colbert in The Massacre of St Bartholomew's Eve (1966) and would return as Leela's love interest Andred in The Invasion of Time (1978).

== Broadcast, reception and archive ==
Episode	Title	Run time	Original release date	UK viewers (millions)	Archive
1	"Episode 1"	23:47	8 April 1967	8.0	16mm t/r
2	"Episode 2"^{†}	25:22	15 April 1967	6.4	Only audio, stills and fragments exist
3	"Episode 3"	23:10	22 April 1967	7.9	16mm t/r
4	"Episode 4"^{†}	24:28	29 April 1967	6.9	Only audio, stills and/or fragments exist
5	"Episode 5"^{†}	23:34	6 May 1967	7.1	Only audio, and stills exist
6	"Episode 6"^{†}	23:38	13 May 1967	8.0	Only audio, and stills exist

^† Episode is missing

The Faceless Ones was broadcast in weekly installments on BBC1 beginning on 8 April and ending on 13 May 1967. The serial had ratings standard for the programme at the time with an average of 7.4 million; the first and sixth episodes had the highest rating at 8 million, while there were dips at episodes two and four with 6.4 and 6.9 million respectively. Episode Six achieved the highest chart position at 33. The Appreciation Index scores were an improvement on the previous serial. On 10 May, the BBC Programme Review Board discussed Doctor Who's oscillating ratings between six and eight million, with head of drama serials Shaun Sutton commenting that he wanted them to stay closer to eight million.

The serial was broadcast in Australia in October 1967, with Episode One receiving three edits to gain a G rating. It was broadcast in Uganda, Singapore, and Hong Kong in 1969; it was also aired in Zambia by 1973.

=== Reception ===
Paul Cornell, Martin Day, and Keith Topping gave the serial a favourable review in The Discontinuity Guide (1995), writing that "the realistic backdrop works very well, and the script is well constructed, augmented by the terrifying appearance of the aliens". In The Television Companion (1998), David J. Howe and Stephen James Walker wrote that "the positive aspects of the story probably just about outweigh the negative." They remarked that the "special effects tend to be rather lacklustre" and there was "far too much talk and not enough action to maintain the viewer's interest over the full six episodes."

In 2009, Mark Braxton of Radio Times noted that there were plot holes but the story "unveils its mystery with ease and elegance". Reviewing the animated reconstruction in 2020 for The Guardian, Martin Belam gave the serial three out of five stars, noting that "the story drags a little" and, aside from Pauline Collins, did not have a memorable guest cast. Kayti Burt from Den of Geek noted that the serial had a "slow start," but it had "generally nail-biting moments of suspense," particularly in the fifth episode.

In the Doctor Who Magazine poll for the show's 60th anniversary in 2023, The Faceless Ones was voted the fourteenth best story of the Second Doctor's tenure, out of a total of 21. Charlie Jane Anders ranked the serial as the 244th best Doctor Who story (out of 254) and a "disappointment" in 2015, writing, "Ben and Polly wander out of the story halfway through, and you wish you could too."

=== Missing episodes ===
Only episodes 1 and 3 of this serial exist in the BBC archives. All episodes besides the fifth were cleared for wiping on 21 July 1969; Episode Five was cleared 22 September 1969. In addition to the complete version, the archives also holds an incomplete print of episode 1, returned from ABC in Australia in late 1978. The print itself was given to ABC from a private collector living in Australia. The Australian Film Censorship Board removed the following scenes: Spencer killing Inspector Gascoigne with a Chameleon ray-gun; the alien arm emerging from the cupboard; and panning shots of the alien figure (seen only from behind) at the end of the episode. The missing scenes were later recovered along with the other copy of episode 1. A copy of episode 3 was returned to the BBC in 1987 from a private collector living in the United Kingdom. 20 seconds of material was, and is, missing from episode 3, due to damage to the print. A three-second clip of the impostor Polly brushing off a remark from the Doctor survives from episode 2. Two brief plane shots used in episode 4 also survive.

=== Airing of animation reconstruction ===
The 2020 animated reconstruction aired in the United States on BBC America in two installments on 7 and 8 October 2020.

== Commercial releases ==
=== In print ===
The Faceless Ones
- Author: Terrance Dicks
- Cover artist: Tony Masero
- Series: Doctor Who book: Target novelisations
- Release number: 116
- Publisher: Target Books
- Publication date: December 1986 (Hardback) 21 May 1987 (Paperback)
- ISBN: 0-426-20294-5

A novelisation of this serial, written by Terrance Dicks, was published by Target Books and WH Allen in December 1986. Hulke had been interested in novelising it in the 1970s, but he died in 1979.

=== Home media ===
As with all missing episodes, off-air recordings of the soundtrack exist due to contemporary fan efforts. In February 2002 these were released on CD, accompanied by linking narration from Frazer Hines. The soundtrack was also included in the 2012 CD Lost TV Episodes: Collection Four: 1967 from AudioGo, accompanied by PDFs of scripts and interviews with Hines and Wills. In November 2003, episodes one and three of this serial were released on VHS by BBC Worldwide, along with episode one of The Web of Fear, as part of The Reign of Terror boxset; this was the final VHS release, coinciding with the programme's fortieth anniversary. In November 2004, the surviving episodes were included in the three-disc Lost in Time DVD set.

A DVD and Blu-ray release occurred on 16 March 2020; this release included both surviving episodes accompanied by an animated version of all six episodes (using the original audio) and featuring a redesign of the alien Chameleons. It was decided to animate all of the episodes despite two surviving to appeal to both new fans as well as the old. Also included is the surviving footage and a photographic reconstruction of the missing episodes.
