= Transport Accident Investigation Commission =

New Zealand government investigative agency for civil transportation accidents

- Te Kōmihana Tirotiro Aituā Waka

Agency overview
- Formed: 1 September 1990; 36 years ago
- Jurisdiction: Government of New Zealand
- Headquarters: Wellington, New Zealand
- Employees: 30
- Annual budget: NZ$9.3 million (2023)
- Ministers responsible: Chris Bishop, Minister of Transport; James Meager, Associate Minister of Transport
- Agency executives: David Clarke, Chief Commissioner; Stephen Davies Howard, Deputy Chief Commissioner; Martin Sawyers, Chief Executive
- Parent agency: Ministry of Transport
- Website: www.taic.org.nz

The Transport Accident Investigation Commission (TAIC, Māori: Te Kōmihana Tirotiro Aituā Waka) is a transport safety body of New Zealand. It has its headquarters on the 7th floor of 10 Brandon Street in Wellington. The agency investigates aviation, marine, and rail accidents and incidents occurring in New Zealand, with a view to avoid similar occurrences in the future, rather than ascribing blame to any person. It does not investigate road accidents except where they affect the safety of aviation, marine, or rail (e.g. level crossing or car ferry accidents).

== Mandate and functions ==
It was established by an act of the Parliament of New Zealand (the Transport Accident Investigation Commission Act 1990) on 1 September 1990. TAIC's legislation, functions and powers were modelled on and share some similarities with the National Transportation Safety Board (USA) and the Transportation Safety Board (Canada). It is a standing Commission of Inquiry and an independent Crown entity, and reports to the minister of transport.

== History ==
Initially investigating aviation accidents only, the TAIC's jurisdiction was extended in 1992 to cover railway accidents and later in 1995 to cover marine accidents.

In May 2006, the Aviation Industry Association claimed too often the organisation did not find the true cause of accidents, after TAIC released the results of a second investigation into a fatal helicopter crash at Taumarunui in 2001. The commission rejected the criticism, CEO Lois Hutchinson citing the results of a March 2003 audit by the International Civil Aviation Organization.

Ron Chippindale, who investigated the Mount Erebus disaster, was chief inspector of accidents from 1990 to 31 October 1998. He was succeeded as chief investigator of accidents by Capt. Tim Burfoot, John Mockett in 2002, Tim Burfoot again in 2007, Aaron Holman in 2019, Harald Hendel in 2020, and Naveen Kozhuppakalam in 2022.

== Counterparts in other countries ==
- Australian Transport Safety Bureau
- Aviation and Railway Accident Investigation Board – South Korea
- Dutch Safety Board – Netherlands
- Taiwan Transportation Safety Board – Taiwan
- Japan Transport Safety Board
- National Transportation Safety Board – United States
- National Transportation Safety Committee – Indonesia
- Safety Investigation Authority – Finland
- Swedish Accident Investigation Authority – Sweden
- Swiss Transportation Safety Investigation Board – Switzerland
- Transportation Safety Board of Canada
- Transport Safety Investigation Bureau – Singapore
