= Erebus: The Aftermath =

New Zealand television series

Erebus: The Aftermath is a 1987 New Zealand television miniseries about Air New Zealand Flight 901, which crashed in Antarctica in 1979. The miniseries, a docudrama, was produced by Television New Zealand, and was broadcast in New Zealand and Australia. It was also aired by BBC 2 television in the UK. It was repeated by TVNZ to coincide with the 30th anniversary of the crash.

The series starred Frank Finlay as Justice Peter Mahon QC, the head of the Royal Commission of Inquiry that investigated the disaster, and David Cole as the chief witness. It was directed by Peter Sharp and written by Greg McGee. It was produced by Caterina De Nave. The series was partially based on Mahon's book Verdict on Erebus.

Erebus: The Aftermath won several New Zealand Film and TV Awards, including Best Drama Programme, Best Drama Series, Best Writer (Drama), Best Television Director, and Best Performance – Male in a Dramatic Role (by Ian Mune).

Erebus: The Aftermath can be viewed, but not loaned or copied, at the Wellington office of the New Zealand Film Archive.

== Cast ==
=== Air New Zealand ===
- Morris "Morrie" Davis – Ian Mune
- Brian Hewitt – Peter Cox
- John Wilson – Lewis Martin
- Ross Johnson – Stephen Tozer
- Peter Grundy – Bruce Allpress
- Anthony Lawson – James Wright

=== New Zealand Government ===
- Rt. Hon. Robert Muldoon – Brian McDermott
- Sir Owen Woodhouse – Patrick Smyth

=== Legal Teams ===
- Paul Davison – Peter Elliott
- Roger MacLaren – Bruce Phillips
- Alastair MacAlister – Jonathan Elsom
- Colin Nicholson – Ken Blackburn
- John Henry QC – Frank Whitten
- David Williams – Geoffrey Snell
- Richard McGrane – Simon Prast

=== Royal Commission ===
- Justice Peter Mahon QC – Frank Finlay
- David Baragwanath – Jeffrey Thomas

=== Privy Council (London) ===
- Lord Diplock QC – Eddie Hegan

=== Civil Aviation Division ===
- Edgar Kippenberger – Jim MacFarlane
- Jack Spence – Don Hope Evans
- Eric Omundsen – Alistair Douglas

=== With ===
- Helen Moulder
- Roy Billing as Captain Gordon Vette
- Paul Gittins
- David Cole
- Maggie Maxwell
- Kevin Wilson
- Bill Johnson
- Paula Jones
- John Watson
- Dinah Priestley
- Pam Merwood
- Johnny Bond
- David Cameron
- Michael Morrissey

=== Narrator ===
- Dick Weir

=== Technical Advisor ===
- Captain G. White

== See also ==
- Air New Zealand Flight 901
- Peter Mahon (judge)
- Ron Chippindale
- Gordon Vette
