= Sam Mahon =

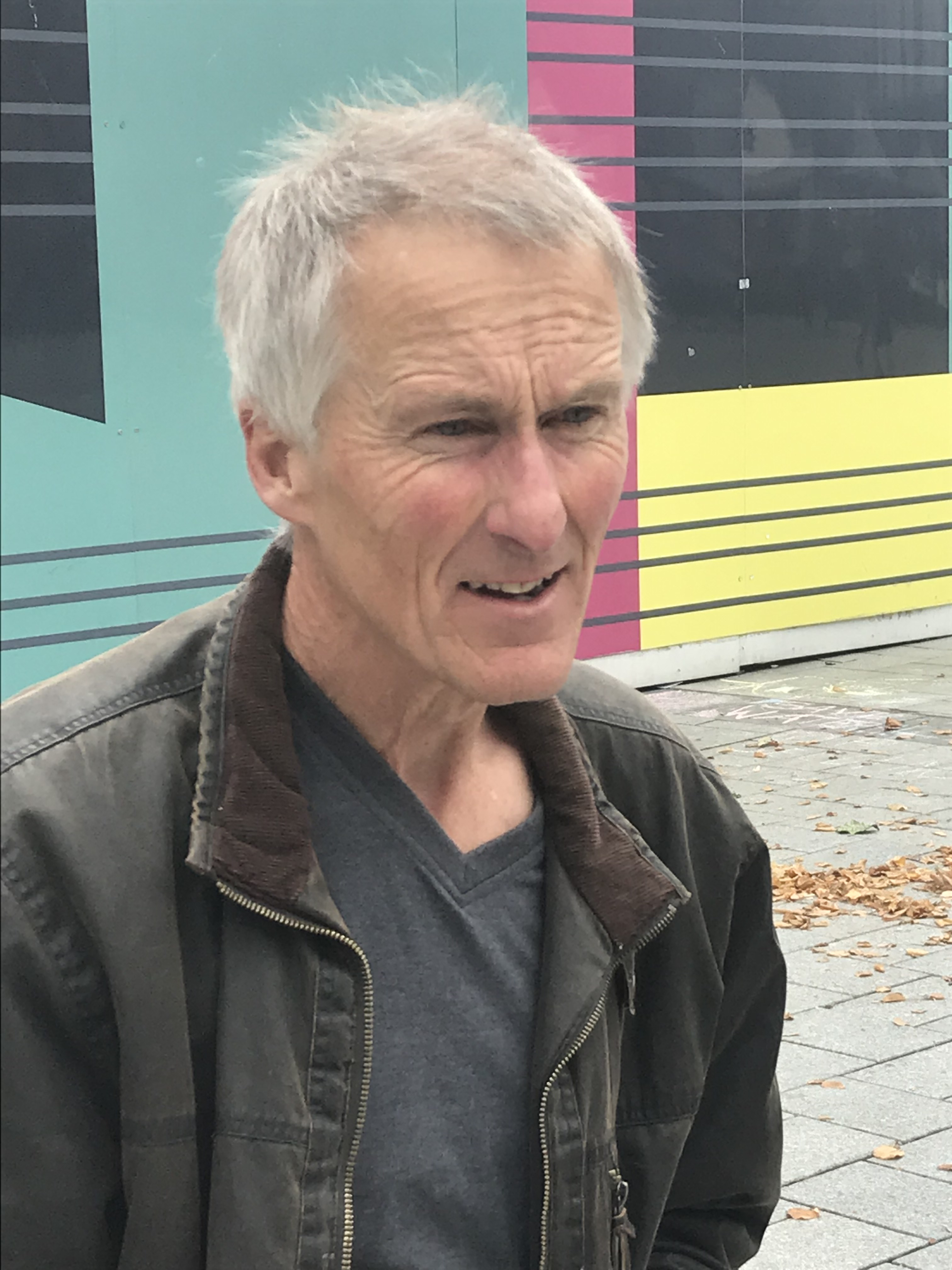
- Mahon in 2019
- Born: July 1954 (age 72)

Sam Mahon (born July 1954) is an artist and author living in Waikari in North Canterbury in the South Island of New Zealand. He is the son of Peter Mahon, a lawyer notable for the Mt Erebus disaster inquiry, and has written a book about his father.

== Works ==
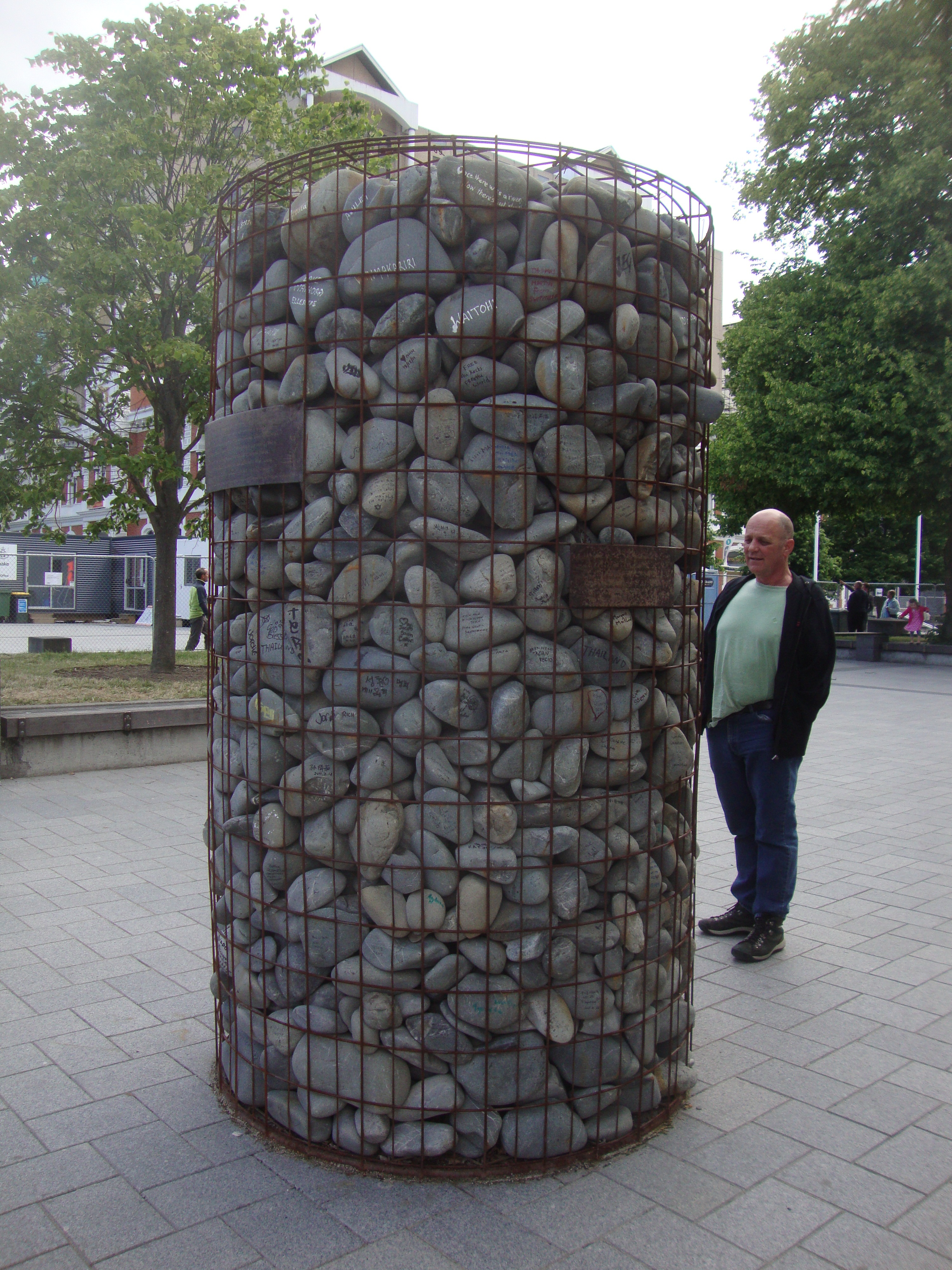
Mahon's stone cairn in Cathedral Square, protesting the loss of regional democracy in Canterbury

Sam Mahon has become involved with preventing water pollution in the Canterbury Region and is using art to highlight the issue. In late October 2009, Mahon made a bust of Environment Minister Nick Smith out of dairy-cow dung in order to publicise the campaign to stop the Hurunui River from being dammed for irrigation. He later sold the sculpture on online auction website Trade Me, where he described the sculpture or the subject as "light and hollow and highly polished".

In March 2010, the National Government passed legislation that saw elected members of Environment Canterbury replaced with government-appointed commissioners. Three months later at a protest rally in Cathedral Square, the largest protest in the Square in years, Mahon installed a stone cairn opposite ChristChurch Cathedral's entrance. Protesters were encouraged to bring a river stone, and the cairn remains to this day.

In the lead up to the 2011 election he created a painting of prime minister John Key dead in an alley. The image was made into a game on his website where visitors could guess who killed the PM by watching video clips embedded on the page. Those who guess correctly will be announced on election day (26 November) and be eligible to win prizes, including a cast bronze of a dying dove, another work by Mahon which he describes as "a metaphor for dying hopes".

How to paint a nude was shortlisted for the Jann Medlicott Acorn Prize for Fiction at the 2026 Ockham New Zealand Book Awards.

== Bibliography ==
- The Year of the Horse (2002) ISBN 978-1-877135-73-6
- The Water Thieves (2006) ISBN 978-1-877361-51-7
- My Father's Shadow (2008) ISBN 978-1-877460-17-3
- Franzi and the great terrain robbery (2011) ISBN 978-0-473-19882-4
- How to paint a nude (2025) ISBN 978-1-067086-52-7

== See also ==
- New Zealand art
