= Neither the Sea nor the Sand =

1972 film by Fred Burnley

- Directed by: Fred Burnley
- Written by: Gordon Honeycombe (screenplay); Rosemary Davies (additional dialogue)
- Based on: Neither the Sea nor the Sand by Gordon Honeycombe
- Produced by: Peter Fetterman; Jack Smith
- Starring: Susan Hampshire; Frank Finlay; Michael Petrovitch; Michael Craze
- Production companies: Tigon Film Distributors; Portland Film Corporation
- Distributed by: LMG Film Productions Limited
- Release date: November 1972
- Running time: 91 minutes
- Country: United Kingdom
- Language: English

Neither the Sea nor the Sand (also known as The Exorcism of Hugh) is a 1972 British horror film directed by Fred Burnley and starring Susan Hampshire, Frank Finlay, Michael Petrovitch and Michael Craze. It was written by Gordon Honeycombe and Rosemary Davies based on Honeycombe's 1969 novel of the same title.

== Plot ==
Anna Robinson, having recently left her husband, has retreated to Jersey, where she attempts to sort out her complicated life. One day while out walking, she encounters a man named Hugh Debernon, with whom she begins a relationship, much to the disapproval of Hugh's religious brother, George.

On a holiday to Scotland, Anna begins to question the relationship, worried that it may just be an affair, for which Hugh reassures her that it is not the case and declares his love. While Hugh is chasing Anna on a beach, he suddenly collapses and is pronounced dead by the local doctor. A distraught Anna cannot accept that he is gone. During the night Hugh miraculously returns, much to Anna's delight, convinced that the doctor had made a mistake.

During their trip back to Jersey, Hugh does not speak and continually stares at Anna. Upon their return home, Anna realises that something is wrong. George tries to convince Anna that Hugh is dead, for which she remains in denial. He accuses Anna of being a witch and that she conjured an evil spirit that possessed his brother's dead body, which somehow explains why he is apparently alive and burns Hugh's hand to try and prove his theory. George is adamant that Hugh is possessed and must be exorcised by a priest. Hugh begins to communicate with Anna telepathically and appears to go along with George's wishes. While travelling to see a priest, Hugh forces George off the road and jumps to safety as George plummets over a cliff to his death.

The local authorities attempt to inform Hugh of George's death as Anna continues to conceal the truth and reveals that Hugh died in Scotland and passes on Hugh's death certificate. She soon realises that they can't keep up the facade for much longer as Hugh begins to get aggressive. A friend of Hugh's, Collie Delamare, tries to comfort Anna following the news of Hugh's passing and becomes suspicious of her. Anna realises that Hugh is really gone and is willing to die to be with him. Collie follows Anna across the beach and witnesses her join Hugh as the pair walk into the sea.

== Cast ==
- Susan Hampshire as Anna Robinson
- Frank Finlay as George Dabernon
- Michael Petrovitch as Hugh Dabernon
- Michael Craze as Collie Delamare
- Jack Lambert as Dr. Irving
- Betty Duncan as Mrs. MacKay
- David Garth as Mr. MacKay
- Tony Booth as Delamare

== Critical reception ==
The Monthly Film Bulletin wrote: "The film's theme – of the power of love to overcome the fact of death – falls somewhere between The Monkey's Paw and Wuthering Heights, but its treatment here is poorly balanced, with the overwhelming love between Hugh and Anna insufficiently established in the early scenes to lend any credibility to the fantastic events of the later ones. Their relationship is conveyed either through flat verbal statements or through the all-too-familiar imagery of softfocus walks along the beach and some jolly bicycle rides. Michael Petrovitch's lead-soldier performance as Hugh is more suggestive of death-in-life than of life-in-death, while director Fred Burnley (this is his first feature) never really explores the visual possibilities of his plot: to depict the macabre in the midst of the everyday requires a greater degree of artifice than is displayed here."

In The Radio Times Guide to Films Frances Lass gave the film 2/5 stars, writing: "Based on the novel by one-time newsreader Gordon Honeycombe, this romantic ghost story is a genuine oddity that was sadly overlooked at the time."

Time Out wrote: "Must qualify as one of the worst films of the decade. ... Gordon Honeycombe scripted this awful effort from his own novel".

Sight and Sound wrote: "A distinctive, faintly strange bizarrery from the pulp wastelands of early 1970s Brit cinema, Fred Burnley's swooning zombie romance could only be regarded as 'forgotten' if it were in fact ever noticed at all; it's such a languid and discomfiting mixture of tones and genres that you couldn't blame even the adventurous 'psychotronic' crowd, then or now, for passing it by. ... Invoking Bob Clark's anti-war zombie drama Deathdream (1974), or for that matter William Dieterle's Portrait of Jennie (1948), Burnley's film is a lamely acted ramshackle affair, but it's not a horror film so much as a kind of absurdist ditty, an Ionesco idea in a grade-C movie universe."

Horrified Magazine said, "Neither the Sea nor the Sand has the texture of a folk tale – something that is evoked by a particularly memorable score, which is too rarely-discussed in coverage of the film, from Nachum Heiman."

== Home media ==
Neither the Sea nor the Sand was released on DVD, on Region 1 in the United States and Canada from Redemption on 30 January 2007. The film was released as a rental pre-cert VHS in the United Kingdom in December 1980 through Guild Home Video, and on Region 2 DVD on 21 July 2008 via Odeon Entertainment. It was again made available on DVD from Odeon on 17 July 2017, in a set comprising three films, which includes Blue Blood and The Legacy.

On November 29, 2024, the film was made available on blu-ray for the first time from the boutique physical media company Vinegar Syndrome. It received its first-ever blu-ray release in the UK via 88 Films on 4 August 2025 as part of their "Tigon Collection" subsidiary line.
