= Michael Craze =

British actor (1942–1998)

- Publicity photo
- Born: Michael Francis Craze; 29 November 1942; Newquay, Cornwall, England
- Died: 8 December 1998 (aged 56); Surrey, England
- Occupation: Actor
- Television: Doctor Who (1966–1967)
- Spouses: Edwina Verner (m. 1969, divorced); Helen Daniels (m. 1980)
- Children: 1
- Relatives: Peter Craze (brother)

Michael Francis Craze (29 November 1942 – 8 December 1998) was an English actor noted for his role of Ben Jackson, a companion of the Doctor, in the long-running BBC science fiction television series Doctor Who. He played the part from 1966 to 1967 alongside both William Hartnell and Patrick Troughton.

== Early life and career ==
Craze was born in Newquay, Cornwall. He got into acting by chance as, at the age of twelve, he discovered through Boy Scout Gang Shows that he had a perfect boy soprano voice. This led him to win parts in The King and I and Plain and Fancy, both at Drury Lane, and Damn Yankees at the Coliseum. Once he had left school, he went into repertory and got into TV through his agent. His first television was a show called Family Solicitor for Granada, which was followed, amongst others, by a part in ABC TV's 1960 series Target Luna (written by Malcolm Hulke and Eric Paice and produced by Sydney Newman).

After Doctor Who, Craze founded a film company, Mantic, and produced an award-winning short film entitled Fragment directed by Norman J Warren. It was exhibited at the Commonwealth Film Festival. He worked on several ITV productions, including one episode (The Last Visitor) of Hammer Films' first TV series Journey to the Unknown in 1968. Other television roles include parts in Gideon's Way, Dixon of Dock Green and Z-Cars.

In the 1970s Craze appeared in two cult Norman J. Warren horror films: Satan's Slave (1976) and Terror (1978). He also appeared in the horror/fantasy/romance film Neither the Sea Nor the Sand (1972).

In the 1980s, Craze acted only occasionally and also managed a pub. According to his brother, the actor Peter Craze, who also appeared in Doctor Who, much of Craze's later life was occupied by attending Doctor Who fan conventions.

== Personal life ==
Shortly before filming William Hartnell's final episode of Doctor Who, The Tenth Planet, Craze had an operation to remove a bone chip from his nose after an accident onstage. During the filming of the serial, the polystyrene "snow" thrown into a wind machine by production assistant Edwina Verner caused severe nasal irritation. Despite this, Craze would later ask her out and the two would marry in 1969. He had a son, Ben, with his second wife. Craze enjoyed fishing in his spare time.

== Death ==
Craze died of a heart attack on 8 December 1998. He had fallen down some steps the previous day while picking up his neighbour's paper for her and, owing to a heart condition, was unable to be operated on. Craze's funeral was attended by hundreds of Doctor Who fans, who had become devoted to him through his regular appearances at Doctor Who conventions, as well as series stars including Anneke Wills, Deborah Watling and Wendy Padbury. The Doctor Who theme music accompanied his coffin at the funeral. Craze was cremated.

== Filmography ==
=== Film ===
| Year | Title | Role | Notes |
|---|---|---|---|
| 1958 | Blow Your Own Trumpet | Bert | uncredited |
| 1961 | Spare the Rod | Thatcher | |
| 1965 | Two Left Feet | Ronnie | |
| 1972 | Neither the Sea Nor the Sand | Collie Delamare | |
| 1974 | Madhouse | Reporter | |
| 1976 | Satan's Slave | John | |
| 1978 | Terror | Gary | |

=== Television ===
| Year | Title | Role | Notes |
|---|---|---|---|
| 1958 | Armchair Theatre | Boy | Episode: "The Pillars of Midnight" |
| 1960 | Target Luna | Geoffrey Wedgwood | All 6 episodes |
| 1962 | Dixon of Dock Green | Jimmy | Episode: "The Flemish Giant" |
| 1966–1967 | Doctor Who | Ben Jackson | 36 episodes |
| 1971 | Bel Ami | Max | Episode: "Georges" |
| 1971 | Crossroads | Len Harvey | 21 episodes |
| 1994 | The Healer | Maudie | Television film |
