= Madalena Nicol =

Brazilian actress (191?–1996)

- Born: Maria Magdalena Mendes Cajado; 25 December 1919; São Paulo, Brazil
- Died: 6 November 1996 (aged 76); São Paulo, Brazil
- Occupations: Actress, singer, theatre director, teacher
- Spouse: Lancelot Vivian Nicol (m. 1941; died 1964)

Madalena Nicol (25 December 1919 – 6 November 1996) was a Brazilian actress.

== Biography ==
A grandniece of Prudente de Morais, she was born on Christmas Day and educated in a convent before studying law at the University of São Paulo, planning to follow in the footsteps of her attorney father. However, her interest overwhelmed this desire and she became a singer.

Known as Senorita Magdalena Mendes Cajado, Madalena began her career as a soprano, singing Brazilian folk songs. She performed at the White House for President Franklin D. Roosevelt as well as touring Paris and New York.

During the 1940s and 1950s, Nicol made a name for herself, performing and directing in São Paulo for Grande Teatro Tupi. She was the first theatre actress to appear on TV Tupi. In 1952, she transferred to TV Paulista and created the drama series Teatro Madalena Nicol which remained on air until 1953 when Teatro Cacilda Becker took over.

In 1954, Nicol spent two years working in France (mainly with Jean-Louis Barrault's troupe, Compagnie Renaud-Barrault) and then fifteen years in England. In 1957, she was directed in monologues (solo performances) at the Arts Theatre in London by Brazilian director Sérgio Viotti and afterwards made guest appearances in British TV shows like International Detective, Dixon of Dock Green, Doctor Who (1967's The Faceless Ones) and The Champions.

Returning to her home country in the early 1970s, Nicol resumed her work in the theatre. In the late 1970s, she taught drama at the Houston Academy of Dramatic Art in Texas.
