= David Ellis (scriptwriter) =

English screenwriter (1918–1978)

- Born: Derrick Francis Kerkham; 22 June 1918; Salford, England
- Died: 30 June 1978 (aged 60); Brighton, England
- Occupation: co-writer

David Ellis (born Derrick Francis Kerkham; 22 June 1918 – 30 June 1978) was an English writer.

== Early life ==
Joining Manchester Repertory Company, Ellis worked in other repertory companies within provinces including Bolton, Keighley, Crewe, Worcester and Derby as a stage producer and director. This led to him writing stage plays.

== Career ==
Making acquaintance with Malcolm Hulke at the annual awards dinner of the Writers' Guild of Great Britain in March 1966, the pair wrote the Doctor Who serial The Faceless Ones, recorded with Patrick Troughton in 1967. The story was penned by the duo following the rejection of a previous script by the two men. Indeed, Ellis himself had seen his script ideas for “The Clock”, “The People Who Couldn't Remember” (with Hulke) and “The Ocean Liner” all rejected. Their script “The Big Store” was also finally not commissioned despite extensive work, though some of the ideas about the substitution of people by replicas was taken further in The Faceless Ones, with the scenario changed from a department store to an airport.

Ellis' other writing credits include Paul Temple, Spy Trap and many episodes of Dixon of Dock Green in the 1960s and Z-Cars in the late 1960s and early 1970s. Ellis wrote detective plays for the Midweek Theatre slot on BBC Radio 4. His radio serial in seven parts Find the Lady, first broadcast on BBC Radio 2 in January 1969, was rebroadcast on BBC Radio 4 Extra in January 2020. He also wrote stage plays. Make Me A Widow was the most successful of these, opening in London in the Summer of 1964 and playing in repertory around the country for many years afterwards.

== Proposed Doctor Who stories ==
Doctor Who: The Clock

Ellis had written this story since March 1966. Not much was known about it. A minor plot of the story was to be a four-part story that would see the Doctor, Polly, and Ben encounter a disastrous result from ‘the clock’ of his TARDIS (theories/references to The Daleks' Master Plan).

The story was rejected by story editor Gerry Davis on 4 April 1966 because he considered the plot too complicated. Davis also rejected Ellis' four-part serial: The Ocean Liner.

The People Who Couldn’t Remember

Co-written with Malcolm Hulke, this was to be a six-part story. Not much is known about this story. This was rejected by story editor Gerry Davis on 15 June 1966 because Davis wanted to avoid submitting ‘Who-historical’ comedies for one primary example, The Gunfighters with its poor production reception.

The Ocean Liner

This four-part spy thriller story was submitted in December 1965. Not much is known about it. The story was rejected by Gerry Davis on 4 April 1966 for the same reason as for “The Clock”.

The Big Store
Ellis, who once again co-wrote with Hulke in November 1966, submitted this four-part story, with complete drafts for Episode One.

The story would see the Doctor, Polly, Jamie, and Ben land in a mall in 1973, where they discover two, unidentified aliens; one by numbers and another with letters. The unidentified aliens plan on wiping out the human race with a plague too strong to handle. Mannequins as robots break through glass shop windows.

Script editor Gerry Davis liked the story concept but wanted a proper setting at an airport station, so they changed the story to The Faceless Ones. The mannequin invasion story idea was reused in Robert Holmes' Spearhead from Space in 1970 as a Jon Pertwee serial.

== Personal life ==
While working at Manchester Repertory Company in 1946, Ellis met Eva Cubbin and they were married later that year at Manchester Cathedral. Unfortunately, the marriage only lasted for eight or twelve weeks, since upon moving to St. Anne's-on-Sea, the author was "keeping company with another lady" and did not want his wife living with him. As a result, Cubbin obtained a separation order as his attitude had not changed. Despite this, the writer continued to pay his wife £2 10s per week as weekly maintenance money and a son, Christopher (born 1947) was produced from the relationship.

In 1951, Ellis met Joan Margaret Brogden, a nurse at the Retreat in York. Explaining that he was already married but going through a divorce, they decided to wed when the divorce came through. They decided to emigrate to Australia, stopping in Los Angeles on the way. There, Ellis told Brogden that he had received a letter from his solicitors informing that his wife had been killed in a car accident. The couple were subsequently married in San Francisco on 4 May 1951.

Returning to England from Australia in 1952, the author worked as manager of Granada Cinema in Slough. In 1956, he was sentenced to six months in prison for committing bigamy since his first wife was still alive and living in Stockport.

By the time of his passing, Ellis was married to a third woman named Dorothy (who lived into her nineties).
