= Fred Burnley =

British television and film director (1933–1975)

- Born: 1933
- Died: 1975 (aged 41–42)
- Occupations: Television and film director

Fred Burnley (1933–1975) was a British television and film director.

== Life ==
Burnley was educated at The Queen's College, Oxford, where he gained a first-class degree in Philosophy, Politics and Economics. He joined Ealing Studios as an assistant on The Ladykillers in 1955, but left after six months to edit TV commercials and documentaries. In 1965 he joined the BBC as director-producer. He directed eight of the Whicker's World series before joining the arts programme Omnibus. His debut for Omnibus was The Dream Divided, on F. Scott Fitzgerald, which was followed by a film biography of Amedeo Modigliani. In 1972 he directed the film Neither the Sea Nor the Sand.

== Death ==
Burnley died of lung complications from exposure to bat guano while filming the dramatised documentary Alexander von Humboldt - 1799 for Michael Latham's 1975 BBC2 series The Explorers.
