= Target Luna =

1960 British science fiction television serial

Target Luna is a British television serial broadcast by ABC Weekend TV in April 1960. It was written by Malcolm Hulke and Eric Paice, directed by Adrian Brown and produced by Sydney Newman who later co-created Doctor Who for the BBC. The first serial featured Frank Finlay as Conway Henderson and Michael Craze as Geoffrey Wedgwood. The success of the Target Luna spawned three sequels: Pathfinders in Space (September 1960), Pathfinders to Mars (December 1960 – January 1961) and Pathfinders to Venus (March 1961), starring Gerald Flood and Stewart Guidotti in the recast roles, as Henderson and Geoffrey respectively.

== Serials ==
Over four serials, Target Luna and the Pathfinders proved successful with the viewing public, with episode 4 of Pathfinders to Mars getting to second place in audience ratings on New Year's Day 1961.

== Target Luna ==
Number of episodes: 6

- The Rocket Station
- Count Down
- The Strange Illness
- Storm in Space
- Solar Flare
- The Falling Star

=== Synopsis ===
Professor Norman Wedgwood (David Markham) is the head of an experimental rocket group on remote Buchan Island in Scotland. His children, Geoff (Michael Craze), Valerie (Sylvia Davies) and Jimmy (Michael Hammond) visit him to watch the launch of his latest rocket, along with journalist Conway Henderson (Frank Finlay). When the pilot is taken ill, Jimmy finds himself taking his place on a mission to the Moon along with his pet hamster, Hamlet. After several harrowing hours in space, Jimmy, Hamlet and the rocket are finally brought down to earth.

== Pathfinders in Space ==
Number of episodes: 7

- Convoy to the Moon
- Spaceship from Nowhere
- Luna Bridgehead
- The Man in the Moon
- The World of Lost Toys
- Disaster on the Moon
- Rescue in Space

=== Synopsis ===
Professor Norman Wedgwood (now Peter Williams) and his team are planning another rocket mission to the Moon. Once again, Geoff, Valerie and Jimmy (now Stewart Guidotti, Gillian Ferguson and Richard Dean) are on hand to witness the launch of a new rocket MR1 (Moon Rocket 1), along with journalist friend Conway Henderson (now Gerald Flood). However, when the automatic supply ship MR2 (Moon Rocket 2) fails to launch Henderson and the children make a desperate rescue attempt with Jimmy's pet Hamlet (now a guinea pig).

Henderson, Geoff and Jimmy (and Hamlet) set off in MR2, only to discover Valerie has stowed away. MR1 lands first with MR2 preparing to land via radio control. But on entry, MR2 nearly collides with an unknown object. Having landed safely, but a hundred miles off, the two parties set off to meet each other. On the way, Jimmy (and Hamlet) fall down a hole which turns out to be an airshaft that leads to a large cavern.

Inside, the MRI group discover an airlock, which leads them all to discover an alien craft. After the party of MR2 arrive, they discover the fossilised body of a man and find an ancient journal regarding the man was once part an alternative human, among others, who fled earth from a war only to die from lack of supplies on the Moon.

Elsewhere, meteors strike MR1 and the rocket explodes, meaning that only two members of the expedition of can leave in MR2. Then Wedgwood makes an attempt to fly the alien vessel. Eventually, the entire group return safely to earth. Once back home, Wedgwood remarks "As man reaches out to touch the stars, who knows what he may find."

== Pathfinders to Mars ==
Number of episodes: 6

- The Imposter
- Sabotage in Space
- The Hostage
- Lichens! (broadcast live)
- Zero Hour on the Red Planet (broadcast live)
- Falling into the Sun (broadcast live)

=== Synopsis ===
A secondary mission in a new rocket, MR4 (Moon Rocket 4), to the Moon takes off from Buchan Island. This time Henderson takes the lead role as pilot accompanied by Professor Wedgwood's oldest son Geoff as radio operator, Professor Mary Meadows, Henderson's niece Margret (Hester Cameron) along with Hamlet. However one of the crew turns out to be science writer named Harcourt Brown (George Coulouris) who has plans to divert the ship to Mars determined there is life on the planet. Brown succeeds in getting MR4 to Mars, but with the length of the journey, the crew decide that the only way to get home is to find water on Mars.

Thankfully, MR4 has landed within a hundred miles of the polar ice cap so the group set off, Brown too, believing there to be life on Mars. Encountering Lichens, crevasses and other perils, Brown is devastated when he discovers no intelligent life and feels cheated by the others. In doing so, he intends to leave the others behind on the planet. However, lichens manage to infiltrate MR4, stopping Brown and giving the Rocket crew a chance to overpower him.

However, Earth has moved out of the Martian orbit, thus, making the journey home impossible. Yet Brown creates a theory that if they can use the gravity pull of the Sun to get home. Some time after setting off, the crew all slowly succumb to gamma rays from the Sun one-by-one. By a miracle, there is a total eclipse and Mercury shuts of the rays from the Sun but they quickly find themselves being pulled into Mercury's gravity pull.

The crew then realise that Buchan Island has made various satellite fixes on Mercury, thus enabling MR4 to make the home journey to Earth. As MR4 falls out of danger from the Sun's gamma rays, Brown ponders of the idea of other life on another planet and sees Venus as a possibility...

== Pathfinders to Venus ==
Number of episodes: 8

- S.O.S From Venus
- Into the Poison Cloud
- The Living Planet
- The Creature
- The Venus People
- The City
- The Valley of the Monsters
- Planet on Fire

=== Synopsis ===
Returning from their unexpected trip to Mars the crew of MR4 intercept a distress signal from Captain Wilson, a U.S astronaut, and must change course for Venus to attempt a rescue in space. However, through the space periscope, Brown sees what appears to be a settlement or a city of some sort. Desperate to investigate, Brown edits Wilson's message and tricks the crew into landing on Venus so as they can rescue him.

Landing on Venus, the crew discover, much to Brown's delight, that the planet is capable is sustaining life and is a vast jungle. Investigating further, the party find Wilson's rocket-capsule, the US V7, ransacked and ripped apart from the inside by something. Brown gets separated from the others and finds Wilson, who then tricks him into finding his 'city'.

Henderson, Meadows, Geoff, and Margret find the trail leading into the caves of the volcano and get separated. Whilst separated, Henderson, Geoff, and Meadows find cavemen whilst Margret (and Hamlet) finds Wilson, Brown, and a Venusian cave-child whom she names 'Kiki'. Reunited, the group are forced to escape the lava flow and find themselves in a desert.

Keeping to the left and through the desert, the Wedgwood party discover Venus is a living duplicate of Earth, with dinosaurs and prehistoric humans existing parallel to each other. As the journey progresses they discover diamonds and uranium deposits. When they get nearer Brown's city, they find it to be nothing but an ancient burial ground for Kiki's ancestors.

Finally returning to the jungle, they discover the lava has set the jungle alight in the direction of MR4. Brown, determined that the planet must not be ruined from what they've seen, decides to set the rocket to overload. However, Henderson turns the tables on him, just in time to see a Russian rocket land nearby. The pilot, Colonel Korolyov, explains they have extra fuel for MR4, in exchange for Wilson's secret mission - an experiment in stellar telecommunications.

Preparing to leave, Brown announces he is remaining behind since Kiki has lost her parents and aware of the responsibilities of hijacking MR4 in the first place, and that to him Venus is an unspoiled paradise. MR4 takes off and is given fuel for the return journey in space.

Finally after months away from home, the rescue party finally return to Buchan Island.

== Full cast ==
=== Target Luna ===
The director for Target Luna was Adrian Brown.

- David Markham as Professor Norman Wedgwood
- John Cairney as Ian Murray
- Frank Finlay as Conway Henderson
- Michael Craze as Geoffrey Wedgwood
- Sylvia Davies as Valerie Wedgwood
- Michael Hammond as Jimmy Wedgwood
- William Ingram as Flt Lt Williams
- Deborah Stanford as Jean Cary
- Robert Stuart as Dr Stevens
- Phyllis Kenny as Pat Maxwell
- Michael Verney as Mr Field
- Annette Kerr as Mrs Wedgwood
- Mel Oxley as the Newscaster

=== Pathfinders in Space ===
With a change of director, Guy Verney, all the returning roles in Pathfinders in Space were recast. Another key addition was that Jimmy's pet hamster, Hamlet, was also made into a guinea pig so it would be noticeable on screen. Despite the mass recast, many references were alluded of the previous serial, making this serial and the follow-ups canonical.

- Peter Williams as Professor Norman Wedgwood
- Harold Goldblatt as Dr O'Connell
- Gerald Flood as Conway Henderson
- Stewart Guidotti as Geoffrey Wedgwood
- Gillian Ferguson as Valerie Wedgwood
- Richard Dean as Jimmy Wedgwood
- Pamela Barney as Professor Mary Meadows
- Irene Sutcliffe as Jean Cary
- Hugh Evans as Ian Murray
- Astor Sklair as John Field
- Michael Guest as Michael Kennedy

=== Pathfinders to Mars ===
As with the previous serial, Guy Verney remained as director.

The characters of Valarie and Jimmy Wedgwood were dropped from the sequel. Professor Wedgwood was retired in the first chapter leaving Conway Henderson as the lead character and Ian Murray as Buchan Island base controller. Margret Henderson, Conway's niece, was introduced, and Harcourt Brown - a scientific writer and extraterrestrial theorist.

- Gerald Flood as Conway Henderson
- George Coulouris as Harcourt Brown (credited as 'The Imposter' in The Imposter)
- Stewart Guidotti as Geoffrey Wedgwood
- Pamela Barney as Professor Mary Meadows
- Hester Cameron as Margret Henderson
- Hugh Evans as Ian Murray
- Astor Sklair as John Field
- Bernard Horsfall as Professor Hawkins
- Peter Williams as Professor Norman Wedgwood (Episode 1 The Imposter only)

=== Pathfinders to Venus ===
Guy Verney continued as director for episodes 1–5 and 7. Episodes 6 and 8 were directed by Reginald Collin.

The main cast themselves remained from the previous serial, with the additions of Captain Wilson and Kiki.

- Gerald Flood as Conway Henderson
- George Coulouris as Harcourt Brown
- Stewart Guidotti as Geoffrey Wedgwood
- Pamela Barney as Professor Mary Meadows
- Hester Cameron as Margret Henderson
- Graydon Gould as Captain Wilson
- Hugh Evans as Ian Murray
- Astor Sklair as John Field
- Brigid Skemp as Kiki (credited as Venusian Child)
- Bob Bryan as The Venusian
- Robert James as Colonel Korolyov

== Production ==
Sydney Newman wanted to develop a children's adventure serial, which could educate its audience about science and the developing Space Race. Malcolm Hulke and Eric Paice wrote all four serials. Target Luna was directed by Adrian Brown. The three Pathfinders serials were directed by Guy Verney with two chapters directed by Reginald Collins. Pathfinders to Venus included scenes of animated Dinosaurs from the Czech film Journey to the Beginning of Time. Midway through Pathfinders to Mars at the last minute, it was decided to have the last three episodes filmed live owing to timing reasons.

== Reception and influence ==
Target Luna and the three sequels gained high audience ratings at the time. One episode was broadcast on Christmas Day 1960 and the production team claimed it had the second highest audience of the day after the Queen's Speech.

Professor Wedgwood and his experimental rocket group appears to be a direct reference to the character and success of Professor Bernard Quatermass on the BBC.

The seventh episode of Pathfinders to Venus (The Valley of Monsters) was used in an academic study of children's attitudes to television viewing. The experiments included showing several on-screen mistakes which were explained at the end of the episode by onscreen-rolling captions:

The mistakes in this episode which you may have noticed are not accidental. They are part of a research project into children's perceptions which the Department of Education of Cambridge University is carrying out in co-operation with the Drama Department of A.B.C. Television.

The study was organised by the Department of Education at Cambridge University. The results suggested that children could forgive minor errors and effects as long as the story was compelling. Sydney Newman later commented "The most important thing we learnt is that if anyone thinks a young audience can be fooled or won sloppily or 'on the cheap' he is sadly mistaken". He also described his audiences as "discerning, intelligent and capable to handle new and innovative subject matter".

Newman left ABC in 1962 to join BBC Television as Head of Drama. In 1963 he initiated the creation of Doctor Who. Two of the actors from the Pathfinders series would later go onto to play companions on Doctor Who. Michael Craze who originated Geoffrey Wedgwood in Target Luna played Ben Jackson alongside the First and Second Doctors, and Gerald Flood provided the voice of Kamelion with the Fifth Doctor.

Many of the cast and crew from the Pathfinders series worked on three further science fiction serials: Plateau of Fear (1961) and its sequels: City Beneath the Sea (1961) and Secret Beneath the Sea (1962). All three serials would star Flood as scientific journalist Mark Bannerman and Guidotti as his photographer Peter Blake.

== Availability ==
As was common at the time these shows were recorded on expensive videotape, which was later wiped and reused. Telerecordings of the Pathfinders series were made for sales to overseas broadcasters. However, Target Luna is currently missing from the television archive. The three Pathfinders series were also thought to be missing but were returned to the ITV from other broadcasters. In 2011 it was announced that the final missing episode had been discovered in ITV's own archive. All three Pathfinders serials were later released on DVD by Network DVD, 51 years after their original transmission.
