= Frank Finlay =

English actor (1926–2016)

Frank Finlay CBE
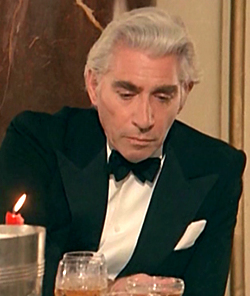
- Finlay in The Key (1983)
- Born: Francis Finlay; 6 August 1926; Farnworth, Lancashire, England
- Died: 30 January 2016 (aged 89); Weybridge, Surrey, England
- Occupation: Actor
- Years active: 1958–2009
- Spouse: Doreen Shepherd (m. 1954; died 2005)
- Children: 3
- Website: Official website

Francis Finlay (6 August 1926 – 30 January 2016) was an English actor. He earned an Academy Award nomination for his performance as Iago in Othello (1965). His first leading television role came in 1971 in Casanova. This led to appearances on The Morecambe and Wise Show. Finlay starred alongside famous Italian actress Stefania Sandrelli in Tinto Brass' The Key, the most successful Italian film of the 1983–1984 season. He also appeared in the drama Bouquet of Barbed Wire. A four-time BAFTA nominee, Finlay won one for his television performances in 1974.

== Early life ==
Finlay was born in Farnworth, Lancashire, the son of Josiah Finlay and Margaret Finlay. He was educated at St Gregory the Great School, but left at 14 to train as a butcher at Toppings, gaining a City and Guilds Diploma in the trade.

== Stage career ==
Finlay made his first stage appearances at the local Farnworth Little Theatre, in plays that included Peter Blackmore's Miranda in 1951. The current Little Theatre president, also in the cast of that Miranda production, remembers him as a perfectionist in his craft. He also played in repertory, initially in Scotland, before winning a scholarship to RADA in London.

There followed several parts in productions at the Royal Court Theatre, such as the Arnold Wesker trilogy. He became particularly associated with the National Theatre, especially during the years when Laurence Olivier was director. Playing Iago opposite Olivier's title character in John Dexter's 1965 production of Othello, and the film adaptation of that production (also 1965), Finlay's performance left theatre critics unmoved, but he later received high praise for the film version and gained an Academy Award nomination. The critic John Simon wrote that the close-ups in the film allowed Finlay to give a more subtle and effective performance than he had done on stage.

At the Chichester Festival Theatre, Finlay played roles ranging from the First Gravedigger in Hamlet to Josef Frank in Weapons of Happiness. He also appeared in The Party, Plunder, Saint Joan, Hobson's Choice, Amadeus (as Salieri), Much Ado About Nothing (as Dogberry), The Dutch Courtesan, The Crucible, Mother Courage, and Juno and the Paycock.

Finlay made appearances on Broadway, in Epitaph for George Dillon (1958–1959), and in the National Theatre and Broadway productions of Filumena opposite Joan Plowright in 1980. Between November 1988 and April 1989, Finlay toured Australia, performing in Jeffrey Archer's Beyond Reasonable Doubt at theatres in Sydney, Melbourne and Adelaide.

== Screen ==
One of his earliest television roles was in the family space adventure serial Target Luna (1960), as journalist Conway Henderson. Finlay's first major television success was as Jean Valjean in the BBC's 1967 ten-part adaptation of Victor Hugo's Les Misérables. He played the title role of Dennis Potter's BBC 2 series Casanova (1971). Following this, he portrayed Adolf Hitler in The Death of Adolf Hitler (1973) for London Weekend Television.

Finlay was one of the stars of Martin Ritt's highly acclaimed 1970 feature The Molly Maguires. He portrayed Richard Roundtree's nemesis, Amafi, in the film Shaft in Africa (1973), before playing Porthos for director Richard Lester in The Three Musketeers (also 1973), The Four Musketeers (1975) and The Return of the Musketeers (1989). He appeared in several additional films, including The Wild Geese (1978) and The Key by Tinto Brass.

Finlay starred as the father in the once-controversial Bouquet of Barbed Wire (1976), and its sequel Another Bouquet (1977), and he was reunited with his Bouquet of Barbed Wire co-star, Susan Penhaligon, when he played Professor Van Helsing in the BBC's Count Dracula (also 1977), with Louis Jourdan. He appeared in two Sherlock Holmes films as Lestrade, solving the Jack the Ripper murders (A Study in Terror, 1965, and Murder by Decree, 1979). He also played a role as the primary antagonist in an adaptation of "The Golden Pince-Nez" of the Granada Television series of Sherlock Holmes starring Jeremy Brett, in which his son Daniel played a minor role as well. Finlay appeared on American television in A Christmas Carol (1984) playing Marley's Ghost opposite George C. Scott's Ebenezer Scrooge. He also guest-starred as a farcical witch-smeller in an episode of The Black Adder ("Witchsmeller Pursuivant", 1983), opposite Rowan Atkinson.

In 1994 he played Howard Franklin in fourth-series Heartbeat episode "Lost and Found". Finlay played Sancho Panza opposite Rex Harrison's Don Quixote in the 1973 British made-for-television film The Adventures of Don Quixote, for which he won a BAFTA award. He won another BAFTA award that year for his performance as Voltaire in the BBC TV production of Candide.

Finlay played the role of Justice Peter Mahon in the award-winning New Zealand television serial Erebus: The Aftermath (1988). In the Roman Polanski film The Pianist (2002), he took on the part of Adrien Brody's father. He starred alongside Pete Postlethwaite and Geraldine James in the BBC drama series The Sins in 2000, playing the funeral director "Uncle" Irwin Green. He appeared in the TV series Life Begins (2004–2006) and as Jane Tennison's father in the last two stories of Prime Suspect (2006 and 2007). In 2007, he guest-starred in the Doctor Who audio adventure 100. Finlay appeared in November 2008 in the eleventh episode of the BBC drama series Merlin, as "Anhora, Keeper of the Unicorns".

== Personal life and honours ==
Finlay met his future wife Doreen Shepherd when both belonged to Farnworth Little Theatre. They had three children, lived in Shepperton, Middlesex. She died in 2005 aged 79. As a Catholic, Finlay became a member of the British Catholic Stage Guild (now the Catholic Association of Performing Arts). Finlay was made a Commander of the Order of the British Empire in the New Year's Honours of 1984 and an honorary doctor of the University of Bolton in 2009.

Finlay died on 30 January 2016 at his home in Weybridge, Surrey, aged 89, from heart failure.

== Awards and nominations ==
Year	Awards	Category	Nominated work	Result	Ref.
1966	Academy Awards	Best Supporting Actor	Othello	Nominated	
1966	Golden Globe Awards	Best Supporting Actor – Motion Picture	Othello	Nominated	
1966	San Sebastián International Film Festival	Silver Shell for Best Actor	Othello	Won	
1967	British Academy Film Awards	Most Promising Newcomer to Leading Film Roles	Othello	Nominated	
1972	British Academy Television Awards	Best Actor	Casanova	Nominated	
1974	British Academy Television Awards	Best Actor	Play of the Month: The Adventure of Don Quixote / Candide / ITV Sunday Night Theatre: The Death of Adolf Hitler	Won	
1976	Laurence Olivier Awards	Actor of the Year in a New Play	When It Comes Down / Weapons of Decree	Nominated	
1983	British Academy Film Awards	Best Actor in a Supporting Role	The Return of the Soldier	Nominated	

== Filmography ==
=== Film ===
Year	Title	Role	Notes	Ref.
1962	Life for Ruth	Henry – Teddy's father		
1962	The Longest Day	Private Coke	Uncredited	
1962	The Loneliness of the Long Distance Runner	Booking Office clerk	Uncredited	
1962	Private Potter	Captain Patterson		
1963	Doctor in Distress	Corsetiere		
1963	The Informers	Leon Sale		
1964	Hot Enough for June	British Embassy porter	Uncredited	
1964	The Comedy Man	Prout		
1965	A Study in Terror	Inspector Lestrade	Reprised the role fourteen years later in Murder by Decree	
1965	The Wild Affair	Drunk		
1965	Othello	Iago		
1966	The Sandwich Man	Second fish porter		
1966	The Deadly Bees	H.W. Manfred		
1967	The Jokers	Harassed man		
1967	Robbery	Robinson		
1967	I'll Never Forget What's'isname	Chaplain		
1967	The Spare Tyres	Council foreman	Short	
1968	Inspector Clouseau	Superintendent Weaver		
1968	The Shoes of the Fisherman	Igor Bounin		
1968	Twisted Nerve	Henry Durnley		
1970	The Molly Maguires	Davies		
1970	Cromwell	John Carter		
1971	Assault	Det. Chief Supt. Velyan		
1971	Gumshoe	William Ginley		
1972	Sitting Target	Marty Gold		
1972	Danny Jones	Mr. Jones		
1972	Neither the Sea Nor the Sand	George Dabernon		
1973	Shaft in Africa	Amafi		
1973	The Three Musketeers	Porthos / O'Reilly		
1974	The Four Musketeers	Porthos	Sequel to The Three Musketeers	
1978	The Wild Geese	Father Geoghagen		
1979	Murder by Decree	Inspector Lestrade		
1979	Ring of Darkness	Paul	aka Satan's Wife	
1982	The Return of the Soldier	William Grey		
1982	Enigma	Canarsky		
1983	The Ploughman's Lunch	Matthew Fox		
1983	The Key	Nino Rolfe		
1985	1919	Sigmund Freud	Voice	
1985	Lifeforce	Dr. Hans Fallada		
1989	The Return of the Musketeers	Porthos	Final film in the Musketeers trilogy	
1990	King of the Wind	Edward Coke		
1992	Cthulhu Mansion	Chandu		
1993	Sparrow	Father Nunzio		
1995	Gospa	Monsignor		
1996	Tiré à part	John Rathbone		
1997	For My Baby	Rudi Wittfogel		
1997	So This Is Romance?	Mike's dad		
1997	The Road to Glory	Yudah Lieb Gold		
1997	Put K Slave			
1998	Stiff Upper Lips	Hudson Junior		
1999	Dreaming of Joseph Lees	Father		
2000	Ghosthunter	Charlie Fielding	Short	
2001	The Martins	Mr. Heath		
2002	The Pianist	Samuel Szpilman		
2003	The Statement	Commissaire Vionnet		
2004	Lighthouse Hill	Alfred		
2007	The Waiting Room	Roger		

=== Television ===
Year	Title	Role	Notes	Ref.
1959	Sunday Night Theatre	Louis	Episode: "Crime Passionel"	
1959-1960	ITV Play of the Week	Various	3 episodes	
1960-1963	ITV Television Playhouse	Lew/Talkative Man	2 episodes	
1962	Z-Cars	Harvey	Episode: "Fire!"	
1962-1969	Armchair Theatre	Various	4 episodes	
1963	Drama 61-67	Albert Hope	Episode: "Drama '63: Albert Hope"	
1967	Thirty-Minute Theatre	The Man	Episode: "Oldenberg"	
1967	Theatre 625	Dr. Dee	Episode: "The Magicians: Dr. Kee, Kelly and the Spirits"	
1969	The Wednesday Play	Albert	Episode: "Blood of the Lamb"	
1969-1973	ITV Sunday Night Theatre	Wilfred Tilly/Adolf Hitler	2 episodes, including "The Death of Adolf Hitler"	
1969-1973	BBC Play of the Month	Various	4 episodes	
1970-1981	Play For Today	Various	3 episodes	
1971	Casanova	Casanova	Main role	
1976	Bouquet of Barbed Wire	Peter Manson	TV mini-series	
1977	Count Dracula	Abraham Van Helsing	TV movie	
1981	Tales of the Unexpected	Arthur Pearson	Episode: "There's One Born Every Minute"	
1982	All for Love	Captain Manson	Episode: "Mona"	
1983	The Black Adder	The Witchsmeller Pursuivant	Episode: "Witchsmeller Pursuivant"	
1984	Sakharov	Kravtsov	TV movie	
1984	A Christmas Carol	Jacob Marley's Ghost	TV movie	
1985	Screen Two	Frank Strange	Episode: "In the Secret State"	
1987	Casanova	Razetta	TV movie	
1987	The Two Ronnies	Bar Customer	Christmas Special	
1988	Erebus: The Aftermath	Justice Peter Mahon	TV Mini-Series	
1992	Stalin	Sergei Alliluyev	TV movie	
1994	The Memoirs of Sherlock Holmes	Professor Coram/Sergius	Episode: "The Golden Prince-Nez"	
1994	Lovejoy	Harold Plum	Episode: "Fruit of the Desert"	
1994	Heartbeat	Howard Franklin	Episode: "Lost and Found"	
1998–1999	How Do You Want Me?	Astley Yardley	10 episodes	
2000	Where the Heart Is	Mr. Turner	Episode: "Legacy"	
2000	The Sins	'Uncle' Irwin Green	BBC drama series	
2003	Silent Cry	Dr. Robert Barrum	TV movie	
2003	Eroica	Joseph Haydn	TV movie	
2003	The Lost Prince	H.H. Asquith	TV movie	
2003-2006	Prime Suspect	Arnold Tennison	3 episodes	
2004-2006	Life Begins	Eric	16 episodes	
2008	Merlin	Anhora	Episode: "The Labyrinth of Gedref"	

== See also ==
- List of Academy Award winners and nominees from Great Britain
