= Peter Mahon (judge) =

New Zealand High Court Judge

The Honourable Peter Mahon QC

Judge of the High Court
- In office 1971–1982

Personal details
- Born: Peter Thomas Mahon; 1 November 1923 Christchurch, New Zealand
- Died: 11 August 1986 (aged 62) Auckland, New Zealand
- Spouse: Margarita Carole Smith (m. 1952)
- Relatives: Sam Mahon (son)
- Occupation: Lawyer
- Known for: Royal Commission of Inquiry into the crash of Air New Zealand Flight 901

Peter Thomas Mahon QC (1 November 1923 – 11 August 1986) was a New Zealand High Court judge. He led a one-man Royal Commission of Inquiry into the 1979 crash of Air New Zealand Flight 901 into Mount Erebus. Contradicting the previously issued official report, his inquiry determined that the flight crew was not at fault and instead "incompetent administrative procedures" within Air New Zealand were to blame. Mahon famously and controversially concluded that the airline's witnesses presented "an orchestrated litany of lies" in their responses to the inquiry.

== Early life and family ==
Born in Christchurch on 1 November 1923, Mahon was the son of Agnes Helen Mahon (née Tankard) and Cecil Owen Mahon. He was educated at St Bede's College and went on to study law at Canterbury University College from 1940.

After two years at university, Mahon enlisted in the 2nd New Zealand Expeditionary Force, seeing active service in Italy and rising to the rank of second lieutenant, and then serving in J Force after the end of the war. He subsequently returned to complete his Bachelor of Laws degree and was admitted to the bar in 1947.

== Early legal career ==
Mahon began his legal career with the Raymond, Donnelly & Co. He was mentored by Sir Arthur Donnelly. Mahon was junior counsel for the prosecution in the Parker–Hulme murder case in 1954. At the commencement of the trial Mahon was assisting Alan Brown. Brown withdrew during the trial and was later admitted to Sunnyside Hospital.

== Erebus inquiry ==
After the crash of Air New Zealand Flight 901 with loss of all aboard on 28 November 1979, New Zealand's official accident report was released by the Chief Inspector of Air Accidents, Ron Chippindale, which cited serious pilot error as the chief cause of the accident. Public demand led to the formation of a Royal Commission of Inquiry into the accident. Mahon produced his report on 27 April 1981, which cleared the crew of blame for the disaster and found that the major cause was the reprogramming of the aircraft's navigation computer without the crew being notified. Mahon claimed that Air New Zealand executives had engaged in a conspiracy to whitewash the inquiry, covering up evidence and lying to investigators, and concluded that they had told "an orchestrated litany of lies". His book, Verdict on Erebus, an account of his inquiry, won the New Zealand Book Awards prize for non-fiction in 1985. Mahon retired from the High Court bench in 1982.

In 1983 the Judicial Committee of the Privy Council held that Mahon acted in breach of two rules of natural justice: first, that his findings must rest on some material of probative value; second, that those who may be adversely affected by his findings must be given a fair opportunity to argue against the findings. The former, the Board held, was breached by two allegations Mahon made in his report. First, Mahon alleged a plan to destroy documents by Air New Zealand management to conceal details of the crash. Second, Mahon alleged the erroneously entered navigational data had been discovered long before the fateful 1979 flight. The latter rule of natural justice, the Board held, was breached in relation to a number of allegations of impropriety by other Air New Zealand Captains, which Mahon had not given them opportunity to respond to. The Board therefore ordered the costs order imposed by Mahon on Air New Zealand be set aside. Importantly, the Board emphasised this finding implied no moral criticism on Mahon, writing:

To say of a person who holds judicial office, that he has failed to observe a rule of natural justice, may sound to a lay ear as if it were a severe criticism of his conduct which carries with it moral overtones. But this is far from being the case.

Indeed the Board stated they were "very reluctantly compelled" to make such a finding, and specifically commended Mahon's work in the inquiry:

[Their Lordships] would desire to place on record their tribute to the brilliant and painstaking investigative work undertaken by the Judge...

In 1985 Mahon was appointed as Commissioner of Inquiry into the 1984 Queen Street riots. In the same year he published Dear Sam, a collection of his letters to his children. He died of heart failure in August 1986.

In 1999 Transport Minister Maurice Williamson tabled Mahon's findings in parliament. His report had not previously been officially accepted as the verdict on the Erebus tragedy. In 2008, Mahon was posthumously awarded the Jim Collins Memorial Award by the New Zealand Airline Pilots Association for exceptional contributions to air safety, "in forever changing the general approach used in transport accidents investigations world wide." In the 1988 TVNZ dramatisation of the inquiry, Erebus: The Aftermath, Mahon was played by Frank Finlay.

== Publications ==
— (1984). Verdict on Erebus. Auckland: Collins. ISBN 978-0-00-217213-4.
— (1985). Dear Sam. Fontana/Collins. ISBN 978-0-00-634926-6. A collection of letters to family and friends

== See also ==
- Air New Zealand Flight 901
- Erebus: The Aftermath (TV miniseries)
