= Ron Chippindale =

New Zealand air accident investigator

- Chippindale at Christchurch in 1979, preparing to depart for Antarctica
- Born: March 26, 1933; Kettering, Northamptonshire, England
- Died: February 12, 2008 (aged 74); Porirua, Wellington Region, New Zealand
- Spouse: June Rosemary Spackman (married 1954)
- Children: 4

Ronald Chippindale (26 March 1933 – 12 February 2008) was the Chief Inspector of Air Accidents in charge of the New Zealand Office of Air Accidents Investigations.

== Early life and family ==
Born in Kettering, Northamptonshire, England, on 26 March 1933, Chippindale was the son of George Frederick Chippindale, an engineer in the Royal Air Force, and Irene Eulalia Chippindale (née Neall). The family moved to New Zealand in 1938, and Ron Chippindale was educated at Rangiora High School.

In 1954, Chippindale married June Rosemary Spackman, and the couple went on to have four children.

== RNZAF career ==
Chippindale was a pilot for the Royal New Zealand Air Force (RNZAF) from 1951 to 1974, flying transport and training aircraft. He was a qualified flight instructor and spent over eight years in Defence Flight Safety before retiring (as a squadron leader) after 23 years of service. He was a graduate of the Royal Air Force College Cranwell.

== Inspector of Air Accidents ==
On retirement from the RNZAF, Chippindale was appointed as an Inspector of Air Accidents in 1974 and in 1975 became Chief Inspector of Air Accidents in charge of the New Zealand Office of Air Accidents Investigations.

During this time period, he was the investigator-in-charge of 48 aircraft and rail accidents and incidents, and had overall responsibility for the investigation of approximately 400 accidents and incidents. He was involved in several major aircraft accident investigation such as being the chief investigator of the November 1979 Mount Erebus Disaster, the DC-10 accident in Antarctica in which 257 lives were lost. He participated in the subsequent investigation with official accident report concluding that the accident was the result of pilot error. The conclusion was controversial and a Royal Commission was established presided over by Justice Peter Mahon QC. Mahon's report cleared the crew and blamed the company for altering the programmed flight plan without informing the crew. As part of the report Chippindale was described as having a poor grasp of the flying involved in jet airline operation, as he (and the New Zealand Civil Aviation Authority - CAA in general) was typically involved in investigating simple light aircraft crashes. Chippindale's investigation techniques were revealed as lacking in rigour, which allowed errors and avoidable gaps in knowledge to appear in reports. Consequently, Chippindale entirely missed the importance of the flight plan change and the rare meteorological conditions of Antarctica.

When the Office was abolished in 1990, he was appointed Acting Chief Executive Officer and Chief Inspector of Air Accidents in the Transport Accident Investigation Commission (TAIC), which replaced the Office of Air Accidents Investigation. In 1992, when a Chief Executive was appointed, Chippindale became the Chief Inspector of Accidents with the TAIC, an appointment he retained until his retirement on 31 October 1998.

He was a member of International Civil Aviation Organization (ICAO) teams, which investigated the Mozambican Tupolev Tu-134 air disaster in South Africa in which the President of Mozambique lost his life, and the shooting down of three civil aircraft: Korean Air Lines Flight 007 over Russia and two United Nations (UN) Lockheed L-100 Hercules aircraft in Angola.

Chippindale represented New Zealand at Accident Investigation Group meetings of ICAO and drafted the ICAO circular on the provision of "Family Assistance" after an aircraft accident. He was also the New Zealand Councillor to the International Society of Air Accident Investigators and a transport accident investigation consultant.

== Honours and awards ==
In 1990, Chippindale received the New Zealand 1990 Commemoration Medal. In 2004, he was awarded the Jerome F Lederer award for outstanding lifetime contributions in the field of aircraft accident investigation and prevention and achievement of the International Society of Air Safety Investigators' Objectives and technical excellence. In March 2007, Chippindale was one of 22 people who received a New Zealand Special Service Medal (Erebus) at a ceremony in Wellington. The medal was awarded for the work in what became known as "Operation Overdue".

== Death ==
On 12 February 2008, while out on an early morning walk near his home in Porirua, 20 km north of Wellington, Chippindale was hit by an out-of-control car and was killed instantly.

At the time of his death, Chippindale was an adjunct lecturer teaching "Aircraft Safety Investigations" in a three-paper series extramurally (by correspondence) at Massey University School of Aviation.
