= Malcolm Hulke =

British television writer and author (1924–1979)

- Born: Malcolm Ainsworth Hulke; 21 November 1924; Hampstead, London, England
- Died: 6 July 1979 (aged 54); Cambridgeshire, England
- Occupations: Writer, author
- Notable work: Doctor Who

Malcolm Ainsworth Hulke (21 November 1924 – 6 July 1979) was a British television writer and author of the industry "bible" Writing for Television in the 70s. He is remembered chiefly for his work on the science fiction series Doctor Who although he contributed to many popular television series of the era.

== Early life ==
Known as "Mac" throughout his life, Hulke was born out of wedlock in 1924 and never knew his father. He later discussed the social stigma of illegitimacy and his personal experiences of it in a 1964 radio documentary and a 1973 op-ed piece in The Observer. He lived with his mother, Marian, until her death in 1943 in Cumberland. In 1945 he was conscripted into the Royal Navy. Impressed by the Russian prisoners of war whom he met in Norway and by the Red Army's defeat of the Nazis on the Eastern Front, Hulke joined the Communist Party of Great Britain in 1945 and worked briefly as a typist in the party's headquarters. He left the party in 1951, objecting to the Soviet Union's hostility to Yugoslavia and its line on the Korean War, but soon rejoined, and appears to have remained a member of the party until the early 1960s. His politics remained firmly on the left, and this was reflected in his writings, which often explored anti-authoritarian, environmental, and humanist themes.

In January 2015, Five Leaves Press published a short study of his work, Doctor Who and the Communist: Malcolm Hulke and his career in television, written by Michael Herbert. In January 2023 Michael Herbert contributed a chapter on Hulke to an anthology of writing on television series in the 1970s, Survival TV, edited by Rodney Marshall. A biography of Hulke, Things are not always what they seem, by Michael Herbert was published in February 2025.

== Career ==
Hulke was involved with the socialist Unity Theatre in the 1950s and 1960s, serving as its production manager in the mid-1950s, and wrote a booklet in 1961 celebrating the theatre's 25th anniversary. Hulke met writer Eric Paice at Unity and the two wrote as a team for television, beginning in the late 1950s with "This Day in Fear", which was produced by BBC Television in 1958 as part of its Television Playwright anthology series. The pair then wrote four plays for ABC's Armchair Theatre, produced by future Doctor Who creator Sydney Newman. Hulke and Paice also co-wrote two B-movie screenplays, Life in Danger, released in 1959 by Butcher's Films, and The Man in the Back Seat, released in June 1961 by Independent Artists Studio.

In 1960, Newman commissioned Hulke and Paice to write a children's science fiction serials for ABC – Target Luna. Its success led to Newman hiring them to write three more series: Pathfinders in Space, Pathfinders to Mars, and Pathfinders to Venus.

Newman went on to hire Hulke to write a total of nine episodes of The Avengers, four of which he co-wrote with Terrance Dicks, a friend and lodger at the rooming house Hulke managed and whom Hulke recruited as a co-writer when he learned of his desire to break into television.

Newman moved to BBC Television to become its Head of Drama and, in 1964, asked Hulke to write a six part story for a new series Newman had created, Doctor Who. The story, "The Hidden Planet", was about a twin planet of Earth that was hidden on the other side of the Sun. Hulke's story was not produced but he went on to write for the series, beginning in 1967.

In addition to the Pathfinders series, Doctor Who, and The Avengers, Hulke contributed scripts to a number of television series in the 1960s and 1970s including The Protectors, GS5, The Flying Swan, Danger Man, Crossroads, football soap United!, Gideon's Way, and was script editor for Spyder's Web.

His scripts for Doctor Who were known for avoiding black-and-white characterisation and simplistic plotting. Military figures are usually presented unfavourably – Invasion of the Dinosaurs and The Ambassadors of Death both have a general as the ultimate villain. One of his best-known contributions to the series is Doctor Who and the Silurians. This story depicts an encounter between the human race and the remnants of a technological reptilian race that ruled Earth in prehistoric times. Hulke avoids casting either side as heroes or monsters.

He was a friend and mentor to Terrance Dicks, with whom he collaborated in 1962 on The Avengers episodes "The Mauritius Penny", (which was Dicks' first television credit), "Intercrime", "Concerto" and "Homicide and Old Lace"; The War Games, Dicks' first Doctor Who script, and on the non-fiction book The Making of Doctor Who.

He also contributed to Target Books' range of Doctor Who novelisations, adapting many of his scripts before his death, as well as 1973's The Green Death. Hulke's novelisations were noted for providing a wealth of additional background detail and character depth. He wrote an influential screenwriting manual, Writing for television in the 70s in 1974, and an updated version, Writing for Television, which was released posthumously in 1981.

== Death ==
Hulke died of cancer on 6 July 1979, aged 54.

== The proposed stories written for Doctor Who ==
The Hidden Planet

Hulke had submitted this story in January 1964 as a six-part adventure story, and would see the Doctor and his companions land on a parallel planet like Earth, but has clover leaves looking all the same. Women were the dominant race of the planet, whereas men struggle for their own rights. The story was rejected by story editor David Whitaker on 2 February 1964.

The story was resubmitted for Season 2 of the program, as a five-part serial. It was also rejected again by script editor Dennis Spooner in April 1965.

Britain 408 A.D.

This story was submitted for Season Two, but was replaced by The Romans.

The People Who Couldn't Remember

Co-written with David Ellis, According to some fan theories, this story was to be a six-part serial. Not much is known about it. This was rejected by script editor Gerry Davis on 15 June 1966.

The Big Store

Co-written with David Ellis, this four-part serial was submitted in November 1966. Only drafts for Episode One were completed. The story would be set in a shopping mall in 1973. Gerry Davis preferred an airport setting. The story was replaced by The Faceless Ones.

== Doctor Who stories written by Malcolm Hulke ==
=== Television ===
Starring Patrick Troughton:

- The Faceless Ones (with David Ellis, 1967)
- The War Games (with Terrance Dicks, 1969)

Starring Jon Pertwee:

- Doctor Who and the Silurians (1970)
- The Ambassadors of Death (with David Whitaker, Terrance Dicks and Trevor Ray, 1970)
- Colony in Space (1971)
- The Sea Devils (1972)
- Frontier in Space (1973)
- Invasion of the Dinosaurs (1974)

=== Novelisations ===
- Doctor Who and the Cave Monsters (1974) (adapted from Doctor Who and the Silurians)
- Doctor Who and the Doomsday Weapon (1974) (adapted from Colony in Space)
- Doctor Who and the Sea Devils (1974)
- Doctor Who and the Green Death (1975) (adapted from The Green Death, written by Robert Sloman)
- Doctor Who and the Dinosaur Invasion (1976) (adapted from Invasion of the Dinosaurs)
- Doctor Who and the Space War (1976) (adapted from Frontier in Space)
- Doctor Who and the War Games (1979)

=== Radio ===
Hulke also wrote a pilot for a planned radio series starring Peter Cushing as Dr. Who in the late 1960s. Titled Journey into Time, it was produced but the recording was never broadcast and the tapes are now lost. After the script was re-discovered, a fan-made recording was released in 2020.
