= Mount Erebus disaster =

1979 aircraft accident in Antarctica

Mount Erebus disaster Air New Zealand Flight 901
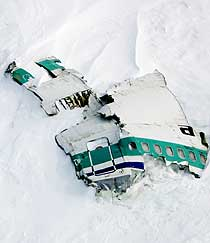
- Debris from the aircraft's fuselage photographed in 2004. Most of the wreckage remains at the crash site.

Accident
- Date: 28 November 1979
- Summary: Controlled flight into terrain
- Site: Mount Erebus, Antarctica; 77°25′30″S 167°27′30″E

Aircraft
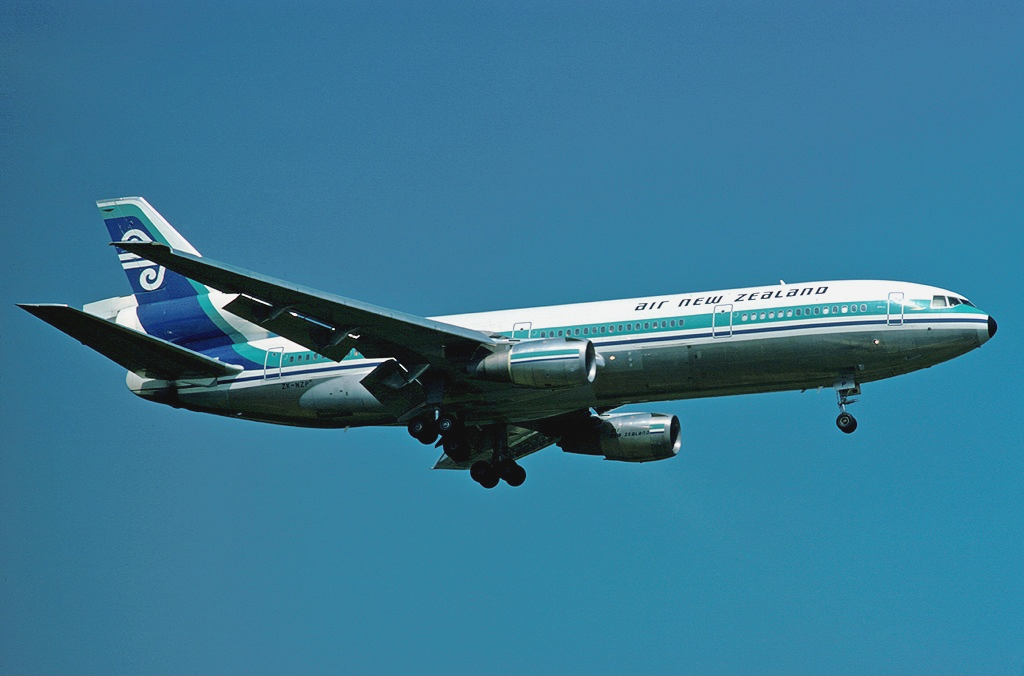
- ZK-NZP, the aircraft involved in the accident, photographed in 1977
- Aircraft type: McDonnell Douglas DC-10-30
- Operator: Air New Zealand
- IATA flight No.: TE901
- Call sign: NEW ZEALAND 901
- Registration: ZK-NZP
- Flight origin: Auckland International Airport
- 1st stopover: Non-stop flight over Antarctica
- Last stopover: Christchurch International Airport
- Destination: Auckland International Airport
- Occupants: 257
- Passengers: 237
- Crew: 20
- Fatalities: 257
- Survivors: 0

The Mount Erebus disaster occurred on 28 November 1979 when Air New Zealand Flight 901 (TE901) (Note: At the time of the crash, Air New Zealand had two IATA codes, TE for international flights (a relic from Air New Zealand's predecessor, Tasman Empire Airways Limited (TEAL)) and NZ for domestic flights (acquired from the merger with the National Airways Corporation in April 1978). Despite being domestic flights from an immigration point of view, the Antarctic flights used the TE code for logistical reasons.) flew into Mount Erebus on Ross Island, Antarctica, killing all 237 passengers and 20 crew on board. Air New Zealand had been operating scheduled Antarctic sightseeing flights since 1977. This flight left Auckland Airport in the morning and was supposed to spend a few hours flying over the Antarctic continent, before returning to Auckland in the evening via Christchurch.

The initial investigation concluded the accident was caused primarily by pilot error, but public outcry led to the establishment of a Royal Commission of Inquiry into the crash. The commission, presided over by Justice Peter Mahon, concluded that the accident was primarily caused by an automatic correction made to the coordinates of the flight path the night before the disaster, coupled with a failure to inform the flight crew of the change, with the result that the aircraft, instead of being directed by computer down McMurdo Sound (as the crew had been led to believe), was instead rerouted to a path toward Mount Erebus. Justice Mahon's report accused Air New Zealand of presenting "an orchestrated litany of lies", and this led to changes in senior management at the airline. The Judicial Committee of the Privy Council later ruled that the finding of a conspiracy was a breach of natural justice and not supported by the evidence.

The accident is the deadliest in the history of Air New Zealand, the deadliest aviation accident in Antarctica, and New Zealand's deadliest peacetime disaster.

== Flight and aircraft ==
Flight 901 was designed and marketed as a unique sightseeing experience, carrying an experienced Antarctic guide, who pointed out scenic features and landmarks using the aircraft's public-address system, while passengers enjoyed a low-flying sweep of McMurdo Sound. The flights left and returned to New Zealand the same day. The plane left Auckland International Airport at 8:00 am for Antarctica, and was scheduled to arrive back at Christchurch International Airport at 7:00 pm after flying 8,630 kilometres (5,360 mi). The aircraft would make a 45-minute stop at Christchurch for refuelling and a crew change, before flying the remaining 747 kilometres (464 mi) to Auckland, arriving at 9:00 pm. Flight 901 was in communication with a Lockheed C-141A Starlifter flying approximately 40 to 50 minutes behind it. Tickets for the November 1979 flights cost NZ$359 per person (equivalent to $2651 in 2026). Dignitaries including Sir Edmund Hillary had acted as guides on previous flights. Hillary was scheduled to act as the guide for the fatal flight of 28 November 1979, but had to cancel because of other commitments. His long-time friend and climbing companion, Peter Mulgrew, stood in as guide.

The aircraft used for Antarctic flights were Air New Zealand's eight McDonnell Douglas DC-10-30 trijets. The aircraft on 28 November was registered ZK-NZP. The 182nd DC-10 to be built, and the fourth DC-10 to be introduced by Air New Zealand, ZK-NZP was handed over to the airline on 12 December 1974 at McDonnell Douglas's Long Beach plant. It had logged more than 20,700 flight hours prior to the crash. Captain Thomas James "Jim" Collins, age 45, was an experienced pilot who had accumulated 11,151 flight hours, including 2,872 hours in the DC-10. First Officer Gregory Mark "Greg" Cassin, age 37, had accumulated 7,934 flight hours, including 1,361 in the DC-10. Flight Engineer Gordon Barrett Brooks, age 43, had 10,886 flight hours, including 3,000 in the DC-10 (Brooks had also been Flight Engineer on the Air New Zealand flight involved in the Cessna 188 Pacific rescue in 1978). Also on board were First Officer Graham Neville Lucas, age 39, and Flight Engineer Nicholas John "Nick" Moloney, age 44. Flight Engineer Moloney had a total of 6,468 flight hours, including 1,700 in the DC-10.

== Accident ==
All times are in New Zealand Standard Time (UTC+12), as at McMurdo Base. Mainland New Zealand was running on New Zealand Daylight Time (UTC+13) at the time of the crash.

=== Circumstances surrounding the accident ===
Captain Collins and co-pilot Cassin had never flown to Antarctica before (while flight engineer Brooks had flown to Antarctica only once previously), but they were experienced pilots and were considered qualified for the flight. On 9 November 1979, 19 days before departure, the two pilots attended a briefing in which they were given a copy of the previous flight's flight plan.

The flight plan had been approved in 1977 by the Civil Aviation Division of the New Zealand Department of Transport and was along a track directly from Cape Hallett to the McMurdo non-directional beacon (NDB), which, coincidentally, entailed flying almost directly over the 3,794-metre (12,448 ft) peak of Mount Erebus. Due to a typing error in the coordinates when the route was computerised, however, the printout from Air New Zealand's ground computer system that was presented at the 9 November briefing corresponded to a southerly flight path down the middle of the wide McMurdo Sound, about 27 nautical miles (50 km; 31 mi) to the west of Mount Erebus. The majority of the previous 13 flights had also entered this flight plan's coordinates into their aircraft inertial navigational system and flown the McMurdo Sound route, unaware that the route flown did not correspond with the approved route.

Captain Leslie Simpson, the pilot of a flight on 14 November and also present at the 9 November briefing, compared the coordinates of the McMurdo tactical air navigation system (TACAN) navigation beacon (about 5 km or 3 mi east of McMurdo NDB), and the McMurdo waypoint that his flight crew had entered into the inertial navigation system (INS), and was surprised to find a large distance between the two. After his flight, Captain Simpson advised Air New Zealand's navigation section of the difference in positions. For reasons that were disputed, this triggered Air New Zealand's navigation section to update the McMurdo waypoint coordinates stored in the ground computer to correspond with the coordinates of the McMurdo TACAN beacon, despite this also not corresponding with the approved route.

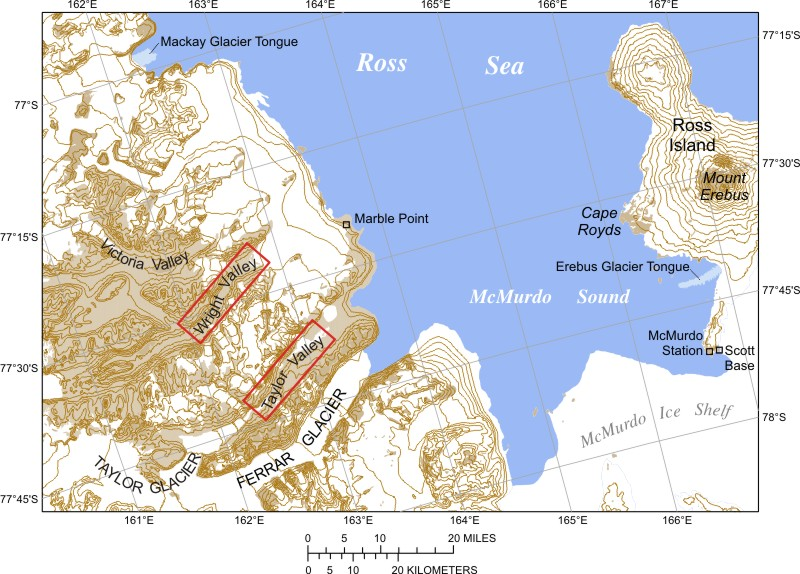
McMurdo Sound, Antarctica

The Air New Zealand navigation section changed the McMurdo waypoint co-ordinate stored in the ground computer system around 1:40 am on the morning of the flight from 77°53′S 164°48′E to 77°52′0″S 167°03′0″E. Crucially, the flight crew of Flight 901 was not notified of the change. The flight plan printout given to the crew on the morning of the flight, which was subsequently entered by them into the aircraft's INS, differed from the flight plan presented at the 9 November briefing and from Captain Collins' map mark-ups, which he had prepared the night before the fatal flight. The key difference was that the flight plan presented at the briefing corresponded to a track down McMurdo Sound, giving Mount Erebus a wide berth to the east, whereas the flight plan printed on the morning of the flight corresponded to a track that coincided with Mount Erebus, which would result in a collision with the 3,794 m (12,448 ft) peak if this leg were flown at an altitude less than 4,000 metres (13,000 ft).

The Air New Zealand computer program was altered so that the standard telex forwarded to American air traffic controllers (ATCs) at the United States Antarctic science facility at McMurdo Station displayed the word "McMurdo", rather than the coordinates of latitude and longitude, for the final waypoint. During the subsequent inquiry, Justice Mahon concluded that this was a deliberate attempt to conceal from the United States authorities that the flight plan had been changed, probably because it was known that US air traffic control (ATC) would lodge an objection to the new flight path.

The flight had earlier paused during the approach to McMurdo Sound to carry out a descent, via a figure-eight manoeuvre, through a gap in the low cloud base (later estimated to be at around 600 to 900 metres (2,000 to 3,000 ft)) while over water to establish visual contact with surface landmarks and give the passengers a better view. The flight crew either was unaware of or ignored the approved route's minimum safe altitude (MSA) of 4,900 metres (16,000 ft) for the approach to Mount Erebus, and 1,800 metres (6,000 ft) in the sector south of Mount Erebus (and then only when the cloud base was at 2,100 metres (7,000 ft) or better). Photographs and news stories from previous flights showed that many of these had been flown at levels substantially below the route's MSA. In addition, preflight briefings for previous flights had approved descents to any altitude authorised by the US ATC at McMurdo Station. As the US ATC expected Flight 901 to follow the same route as previous flights down McMurdo Sound, and in accordance with the route waypoints previously advised by Air New Zealand to them, the US ATC advised Flight 901 that it had a radar that could let them down to 460 metres (1,500 ft). The radar equipment did not pick up the aircraft, however, and the crew also experienced difficulty establishing VHF communications. The distance measuring equipment did not lock onto the McMurdo TACAN for any useful period.

Cockpit voice recorder (CVR) transcripts from the last minutes of the flight before impact with Mount Erebus indicated that the flight crew believed they were flying over McMurdo Sound, well to the west of Mount Erebus and with the Ross Ice Shelf visible on the horizon, when in reality they were flying directly toward the mountain. Despite most of the crew being engaged in identifying visual landmarks at the time, they never perceived the mountain directly in front of them. About 6 minutes after completing a descent in visual meteorological conditions, Flight 901 collided with the mountain at an altitude around 460 metres (1,500 ft), on the lower slopes of the 3,794 metres (12,448 ft) tall mountain. Passenger photographs taken seconds before the collision removed all plausibility of a "flying in cloud" theory, showing perfectly clear visibility well beneath the cloud base, with landmarks 21 kilometres (13 miles) to the left and 16 kilometres (10 miles) to the right of the aircraft visible.

=== Crash into Mount Erebus ===
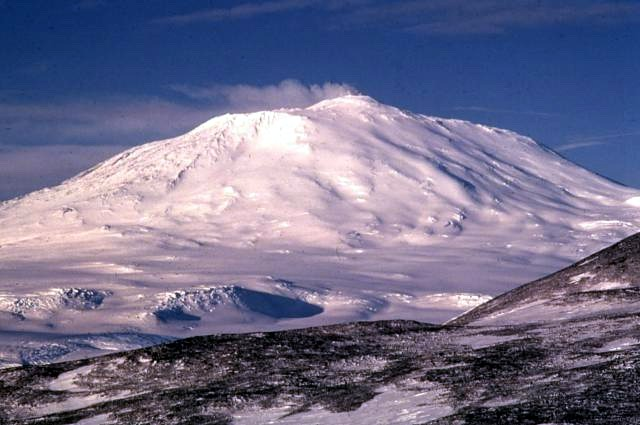
Mount Erebus

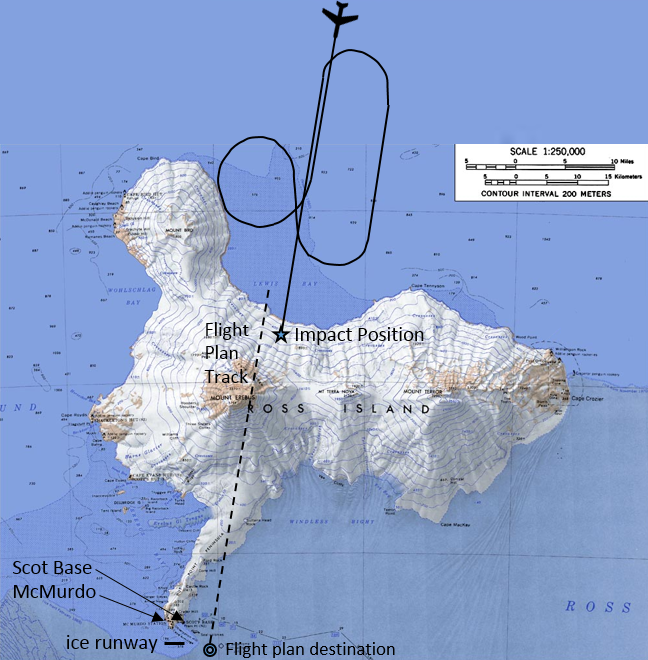
Flight path of Flight 901

Collins told McMurdo Station that he would be dropping to 2,000 feet (600 m), at which point he switched control of the aircraft to the autopilot. Outside, a layer of clouds blended with the white snow-covered volcano, forming a sector whiteout – no contrast between ground and sky was visible to the pilots. The effect deceived everyone on the flight deck, making them believe that the white mountainside was the Ross Ice Shelf, a huge expanse of floating ice derived from the great ice sheets of Antarctica, which was in fact now behind the mountain. Whiteout was little understood, even by the company’s experienced polar pilots—Air New Zealand had provided no training for the flight crew on the sector whiteout phenomenon. Consequently, the crew thought they were flying along McMurdo Sound, when they were actually flying over Lewis Bay in front of Mount Erebus.

At 12:49 pm, the ground proximity warning system (GPWS) began sounding a series of alarms that began with two "whoop" tones followed by an audible command, "Pull up!", warning that the plane was dangerously close to terrain. The CVR recorded the following: (Note: GPWS = ground proximity warning system; CA = captain; F/E = flight engineer; CAM = cockpit-area microphone)

GPWS: "(whoop) (whoop) Pull up! (whoop) (whoop)..."
F/E: "Five hundred feet."
GPWS: "...Pull up!"
F/E: "Four hundred feet."
GPWS: "(whoop) (whoop) Pull up! (whoop) (whoop) Pull up!"
CA: "Go-around power please."
GPWS: "(whoop) (whoop) Pull-"
CAM: [Sound of impact]
End of recording.

The captain had ordered a terrain escape manoeuvre by requesting the flight engineer apply full (go-around) engine power, but it was too late. Six seconds later, the plane crashed into the side of Mount Erebus and exploded, instantly killing everyone on board. The accident occurred at 12:50 pm at a position of 77°25′30″S 167°27′30″E and an elevation of 447 metres (1,467 ft) above mean sea level. McMurdo Station attempted to contact the flight after the crash, and informed Air New Zealand headquarters in Auckland that communication with the aircraft had been lost. United States search-and-rescue personnel were placed on standby.

=== Nationalities of passengers and crew ===
The nationalities of the passengers and crew included:

Country	Passengers	Crew	Total
New Zealand	180	20	200
Japan	24	-	24
United States	22	-	22
United Kingdom	6	-	6
Canada	2	-	2
Australia	1	-	1
France	1	-	1
Switzerland	1	-	1
Total	237	20	257

== Rescue and recovery ==
=== Initial search and discovery ===
At 2:00 pm, the United States Navy released a situation report stating:

Air New Zealand Flight 901 has failed to acknowledge radio transmissions. ... One LC-130 fixed-wing aircraft and two UH-1N rotary-wing aircraft are preparing to launch for SAR effort.

Data gathered at 3:43 pm were added to the situation report, stating that the visibility was 64 kilometres (40 mi). Also, six aircraft had been launched to find the flight.

Flight 901 was due to arrive back at Christchurch at 6:05 pm for a stopover including refuelling and a crew change before completing the journey back to Auckland. Around 50 passengers were also supposed to disembark at Christchurch. Airport staff initially told the waiting families that the flight being slightly late was not unusual, but as time went on, it became clear that something was wrong.

At 9:00 pm, about half an hour after the plane would have run out of fuel, Air New Zealand informed the press that it believed the aircraft to be lost. Rescue teams searched along the assumed flight path, but found nothing. At 12:55 am, the crew of a United States Navy aircraft discovered unidentified debris along the side of Mount Erebus. No survivors could be seen. Around 9:00 am, 20 hours after the crash, helicopters with search parties managed to land on the side of the mountain. They confirmed that the wreckage was that of Flight 901 and that all 237 passengers and 20 crew members had been killed. The DC-10's altitude at the time of the collision was 447 metres (1,465 ft).

The vertical stabiliser section of the plane, with the koru logo clearly visible, was found in the snow. Bodies and fragments of the aircraft were flown back to Auckland for identification. The remains of 44 of the victims were not individually identified. A funeral was held for them on 22 February 1980.

=== Operation Overdue ===
The recovery effort of Flight 901 was called "Operation Overdue."

Efforts for recovery were extensive, owing in part to the pressure from Japan, as 24 passengers had been Japanese. The operation lasted until 9 December 1979, with up to 60 recovery workers on site at a time. A team of New Zealand Police officers and a mountain-face rescue team were dispatched on a No. 40 Squadron C-130 Hercules aircraft.

The job of individual identification took many weeks, and was largely done by teams of pathologists, dentists, and police. The mortuary team was led by Inspector Jim Morgan, who collated and edited a report on the recovery operation. Recordkeeping had to be meticulous because of the number and fragmented state of the human remains that had to be identified to the satisfaction of the coroner. The exercise resulted in 83% of the deceased passengers and crew eventually being identified, sometimes from evidence such as a finger capable of yielding a print, or keys in a pocket.

The fact that we all spent about a week camped in polar tents amid the wreckage and dead bodies, maintaining a 24-hour work schedule says it all. We split the men into two shifts (12 hours on and 12 off), and recovered with great effort all the human remains at the site. Many bodies were trapped under tons of fuselage and wings and much physical effort was required to dig them out and extract them.

Initially, there was very little water at the site and we had only one bowl between all of us to wash our hands in before eating. The water was black. In the first days on site, we did not wash plates and utensils after eating, but handed them on to the next shift because we were unable to wash them. I could not eat my first meal on site because it was a meat stew. Our polar clothing became covered in black human grease (a result of burns on the bodies).

We felt relieved when the first resupply of woollen gloves arrived because ours had become saturated in human grease, however, we needed the finger movement that wool gloves afforded, i.e., writing down the details of what we saw and assigning body and grid numbers to all body parts and labelling them. All bodies and body parts were photographed in situ by U.S. Navy photographers who worked with us. Also, U.S. Navy personnel helped us to lift and pack bodies into body bags, which was very exhausting work.

Later, the skua gulls were eating the bodies in front of us, causing us much mental anguish, as well as destroying the chances of identifying the corpses. We tried to shoo them away, but to no avail; we then threw flares, also to no avail. Because of this, we had to pick up all the bodies/parts that had been bagged and create 11 large piles of human remains around the crash site in order to bury them under snow to keep the birds off. To do this we had to scoop up the top layer of snow over the crash site and bury them, only later to uncover them when the weather cleared and the helos were able to get back on the site. It was immensely exhausting work.

After we had almost completed the mission, we were trapped by bad weather and isolated. At that point, NZPO2 and I allowed the liquor that had survived the crash to be given out and we had a party (macabre, but we had to let off steam).

We ran out of cigarettes, a catastrophe that caused all persons, civilians and police on site, to hand in their personal supplies so we could dish them out equally and spin out the supply we had. As the weather cleared, the helos were able to get back and we then were able to hook the piles of bodies in cargo nets under the helicopters and they were taken to McMurdo. This was doubly exhausting because we also had to wind down the personnel numbers with each helo load and that left the remaining people with more work to do. It was exhausting uncovering the bodies and loading them and dangerous, too, as debris from the crash site was whipped up by the helo rotors. Risks were taken by all those involved in this work. The civilians from McDonnell Douglas, MOT, and U.S. Navy personnel were first to leave and then the Police and DSIR followed. I am proud of my service and those of my colleagues on Mount Erebus.

— Jim Morgan

In 2006, the New Zealand Special Service Medal (Erebus) was instituted to recognise the service of New Zealanders, and citizens of the United States of America and other countries, who were involved in the body recovery, identification, and crash investigation phases of Operation Overdue. On 5 June 2009, the New Zealand government recognised some of the Americans who assisted in Operation Overdue during a ceremony in Washington, DC. A total of 40 Americans, mostly Navy personnel, are eligible to receive the medal.

== Inquiries ==
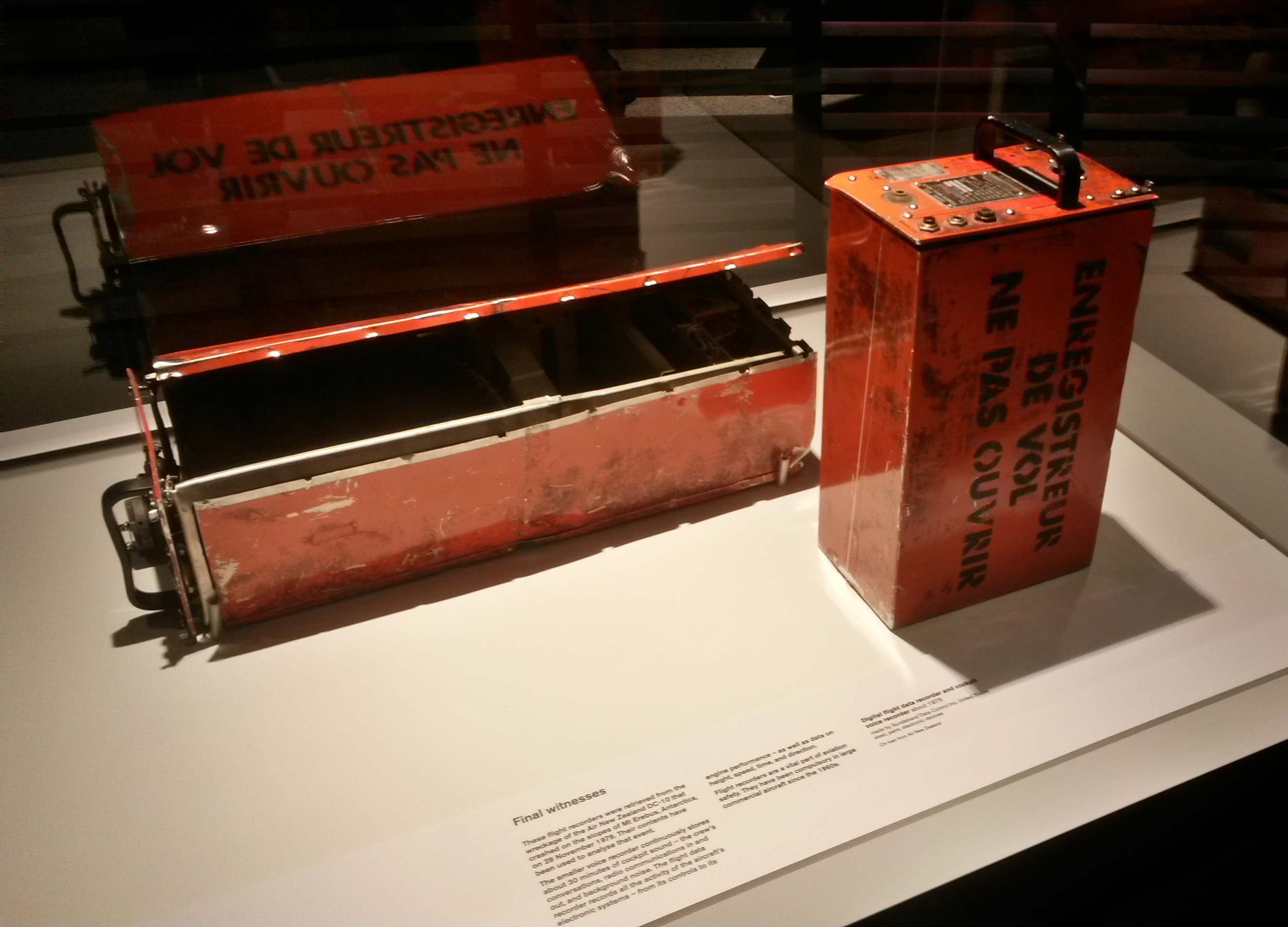
The flight data recorder and cockpit voice recorder of Air New Zealand Flight 901, Museum of New Zealand Te Papa Tongarewa (2015)

Despite Flight 901 crashing in one of the most isolated parts of the world, evidence from the crash site was extensive. Both the cockpit voice recorder and the flight data recorder were in working order and able to be deciphered. Extensive photographic footage, including cine film, from the moments before the crash was available; being a sightseeing flight, most passengers were carrying cameras, from which the majority of the film could be developed.

=== Official accident report ===
The accident report compiled by New Zealand's chief inspector of air accidents, Ron Chippindale, was released on 12 June 1980. It cited pilot error as the principal cause of the accident and attributed blame to the decision of Collins to descend below the customary minimum altitude level, and to continue at that altitude when the crew was unsure of the plane's position. The customary minimum altitude prohibited descent below 1,800 metres (6,000 ft) even under good weather conditions, but a combination of factors led the captain to believe the plane was over the sea (the middle of McMurdo Sound and few small low islands), and previous Flight 901 pilots had regularly flown low over the area to give passengers a better view, as evidenced by photographs in Air New Zealand's own travel magazine and by first-hand accounts of personnel based on the ground at NZ's Scott Base.

=== Mahon inquiry ===
In response to public demand, the New Zealand government announced a further one-man Royal Commission of Inquiry into the accident, to be performed by Justice Peter Mahon. This Royal Commission was initially handicapped in that the deadline was extremely short; originally set for 31 October 1980, it was subsequently extended four times. The report was released on 27 April 1981, and cleared the crew of blame. Mahon concluded that the single, dominant and effective cause of the crash was Air New Zealand's alteration of the flight plan waypoint coordinates in the navigation computer without advising the crew. The new flight plan took the aircraft directly over the mountain, rather than along its flank. Due to whiteout conditions, "a malevolent trick of the polar light", the crew were unable to visually identify the mountain in front of them. Furthermore, they may have experienced a rare meteorological phenomenon called sector whiteout, which creates the visual illusion of a flat horizon far in the distance. A very broad gap between cloud layers appeared to allow a view of the distant Ross Ice Shelf and beyond. Mahon noted that the flight crew, with many thousands of hours of flight time between them, had considerable experience with the extreme accuracy of the aircraft's inertial navigation system. Mahon also found that the preflight briefings for previous flights had approved descents to any altitude authorised by the US ATC at McMurdo Station, and that the radio communications centre at McMurdo Station had indeed authorised Collins to descend to 600 metres (2,000 ft), below the minimum safe level of 1,800 metres (6,000 ft).

In his report, Mahon found that airline executives and senior pilots had engaged in a conspiracy to whitewash the inquiry, accusing them of "an orchestrated litany of lies" by covering up evidence and lying to investigators. Mahon accused Chippindale of having a poor grasp of the flying involved in jet-airline operation, as he (and the New Zealand CAA in general) was typically involved in investigating simple light aircraft crashes.

== Court proceedings ==
=== Judicial review ===
On 20 May 1981, Air New Zealand applied to the High Court of New Zealand for judicial review of Mahon's order that it pay more than half the costs of the Mahon inquiry, and for judicial review of some of the findings of fact Mahon had made in his report. The application was referred to the Court of Appeal, which unanimously set aside the costs order. The Court of Appeal, by majority, though, declined to go any further, and in particular, declined to set aside Mahon's finding that members of the management of Air New Zealand had conspired to commit perjury before the inquiry to cover up the errors of the ground staff.

=== Appeal to the Judicial Committee of the Privy Council ===
Mahon then appealed to the Judicial Committee of the Privy Council in London against the Court of Appeal's decision. His findings as to the cause of the accident, namely reprogramming of the aircraft's flight plan by the ground crew, who then failed to inform the flight crew, had not been challenged before the Court of Appeal, so were not challenged before the Privy Council. His conclusion that the crash was the result of the aircrew being misdirected as to their flight path, not due to pilot error, therefore remained.

Regarding the issue of Air New Zealand stating a minimum altitude of 6,000 ft (1,800 m) for pilots in the vicinity of McMurdo Base, the Judicial Committee stated,

Their Lordships accept unreservedly that ... the evidence given by several of the executive pilots at the inquiry was false. But, even though false ... it cannot have formed part of a predetermined plan of deception. Those witnesses whom the Judge disbelieved on this issue were, as their Lordships must accept, being untruthful ... they were also being singularly naive. [Q]uite apart from the mass of evidence of flights at low altitudes and the publicity given to them ... it is not conceivable that individual witnesses falsely disclaimed knowledge of low flying on previous Antarctic flights in a concerted attempt to deceive anybody.

However, the Law Lords of the Judicial Committee under the chair of Lord Diplock effectively agreed with some of the views of the minority in the Court of Appeal in concluding that Mahon had acted in breach of natural justice by finding that Air New Zealand management had been engaged in a conspiracy, an accusation which they determined was not supported by the evidence. In its judgment, delivered on 20 October 1983, the Judicial Committee therefore dismissed Mahon's appeal. Aviation researcher John King wrote in his book New Zealand Tragedies, Aviation:

They demolished his case (Mahon's case for a cover-up) item by item, including Exhibit 164, which they said could not "be understood by any experienced pilot to be intended for the purposes of navigation" and went even further, saying there was no clear proof on which to base a finding that a plan of deception, led by the company's chief executive, had ever existed.

"Exhibit 164" was a photocopied diagram of McMurdo Sound showing a southbound flight path passing west of Ross Island and a northbound path passing the island on the east. The diagram did not extend sufficiently far south to show where, how, or even if they joined, and left the two paths disconnected. Evidence had been given to the effect that the diagram had been included in the flight crew's briefing documentation.

== Legacy of the disaster ==
The crash of Flight 901 is one of New Zealand's three deadliest disasters – the others being the 1874 Cospatrick sailing ship disaster in which 470 people died, and the 1931 Hawke's Bay earthquake, which killed 256 people. At the time of the disaster, it was the fourth-deadliest air crash of all time. As of January 2025, the crash remains Air New Zealand's deadliest accident, as well as New Zealand's deadliest peacetime disaster (excluding the Cospatrick sailing ship disaster, which happened south of the Cape of Good Hope, en route to Auckland).

Flight 901, in conjunction with the crash of American Airlines Flight 191 in Chicago six months earlier (25 May), severely hurt the reputation of the McDonnell Douglas DC-10. Following the Chicago crash, the FAA withdrew the DC-10's type certificate on 6 June, which grounded all U.S.-registered DC-10s and forbade any foreign government that had a bilateral agreement with the United States regarding aircraft certifications from flying their DC-10s, which included Air New Zealand's seven DC-10s. The Air New Zealand DC-10 fleet was grounded until the FAA measures were rescinded five weeks later, on 13 July, after all carriers had completed modifications that responded to issues discovered from the American Airlines Flight 191 incident.

Flight 901 was the third-deadliest accident involving a DC-10, following Turkish Airlines Flight 981 and American Airlines Flight 191. The event marked the beginning of the end for Air New Zealand's DC-10 fleet, although talk existed before the accident of replacing the aircraft; DC-10s were replaced by Boeing 747s from mid-1981, and the last Air New Zealand DC-10 flew in December 1982. The occurrence also spelled the end of commercially operated Antarctic sightseeing flights – Air New Zealand cancelled all its Antarctic flights after Flight 901, and Qantas suspended its Antarctic flights in February 1980, only returning on a limited basis again in 1994.

Almost all of the aircraft's wreckage still lies where it came to rest on the slopes of Mount Erebus, as both its remote location and weather conditions can hamper any further recovery operations. During the cold periods, the wreckage is buried under a layer of snow and ice. During warm periods, when snow recedes, it is visible from the air.

Following the incident, all charter flights to Antarctica from New Zealand ceased, and were not resumed until 2013, when a Boeing 747-400 chartered from Qantas set off from Auckland for a sightseeing flight over the continent.

Justice Mahon's report was finally tabled in Parliament by the then-Minister of Transport, Maurice Williamson, in 1999.

In the New Zealand Queen's Birthday Honours list in June 2007, Captain Gordon Vette was awarded the ONZM (Officer of the New Zealand Order of Merit), recognising his services in assisting Justice Mahon during the Erebus inquiry. Vette's book, Impact Erebus, provides a commentary of the flight, its crash, and the subsequent investigations.

In 2008, Justice Mahon was posthumously awarded the Jim Collins Memorial Award by the New Zealand Airline Pilots Association for exceptional contributions to air safety, "in forever changing the general approach used in transport accidents investigations world wide."

In 2009, Air New Zealand's CEO Rob Fyfe apologised to all those affected who did not receive appropriate support and compassion from the company following the incident, and unveiled a commemorative sculpture at its headquarters.

On 28 November 2019, the 40th anniversary of the disaster, New Zealand prime minister Jacinda Ardern, along with the rest of cabinet (the state being majority shareholder), issued an apology to the families of the victims “on behalf of Air New Zealand for the accident" and "[apologised] on behalf of the airline which 40 years ago failed in its duty of care to its passengers and staff."

The registration of the crashed aircraft, ZK-NZP, has not been reissued.

== Memorials ==
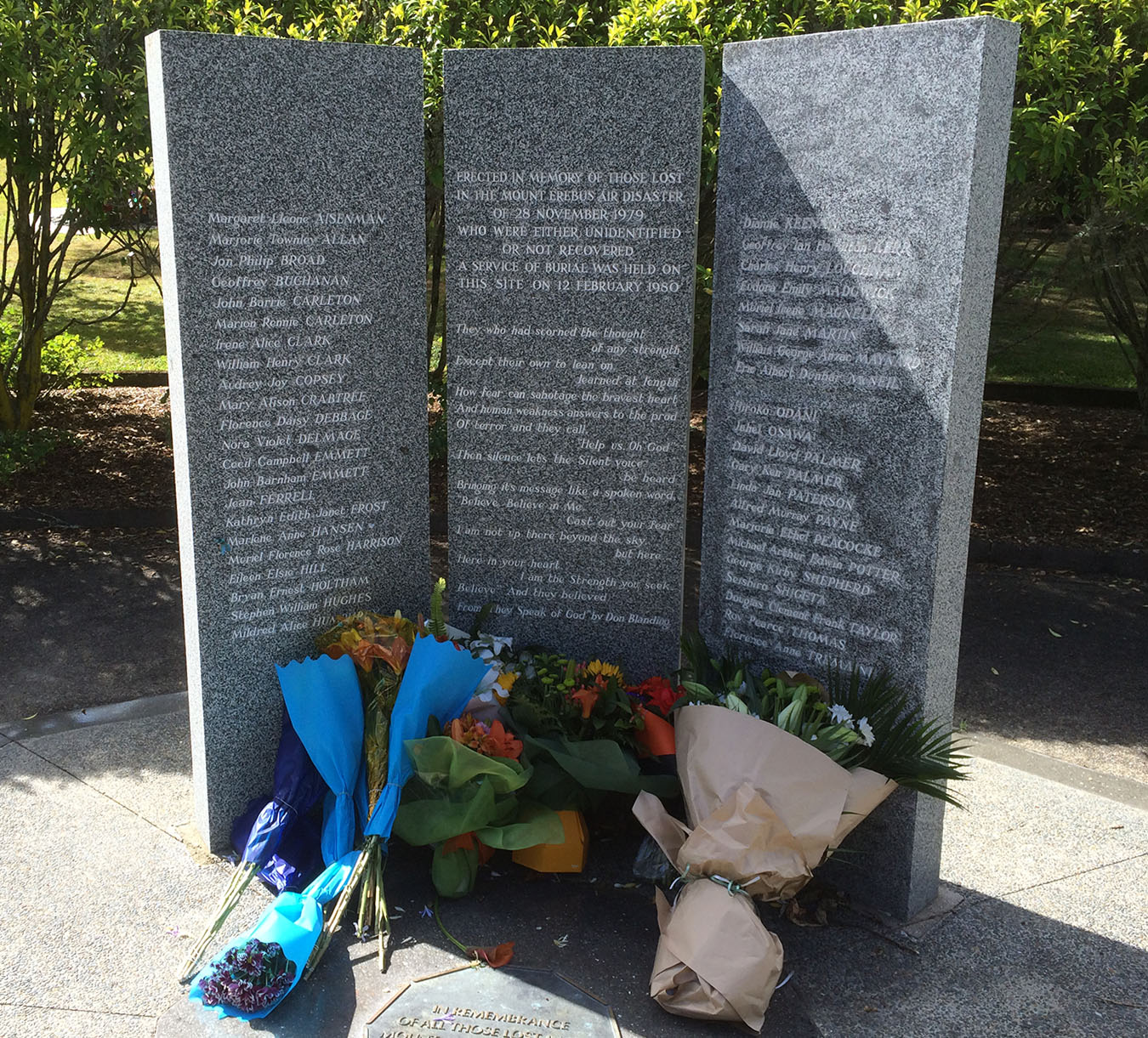
Photograph of the Erebus Memorial at Waikumete Cemetery, Glen Eden, Auckland, January 2014

A wooden cross was erected on the mountain above Scott Base to commemorate the accident. It was replaced in 1986 with an aluminium cross after the original was eroded by low temperatures, wind, and moisture.

The memorial for the 16 passengers who were unidentifiable and the 28 whose bodies were never found is at Waikumete Cemetery in Glen Eden, Auckland. It was dedicated on the first anniversary of the tragedy, in November 1980. Beside the memorial is a Japanese cherry tree, planted as a memorial to the 24 Japanese passengers who died on board Flight 901.

A memorial to the crew members of Flight 901 is located adjacent to Auckland Airport, on Tom Pearce Drive at the eastern end of the airport zone.

On 4 December 1979, six days after the crash, St Matthews in the City Church held a Memorial Service for the victims of the accident. Just before the 10-year anniversary, a memorial stained glass window was installed in the church and dedicated to the 257 people who died.

To mark the 25th anniversary of the Erebus disaster, a wreath-laying ceremony and memorial service was held on Antarctica in 2004.

In January 2010, a 26-kilogram (57 lb) sculpted koru containing letters written by the loved ones of those who died was placed next to the Antarctic cross. It was originally to have been placed at the site by six relatives of the victims on the 30th anniversary of the crash, 28 November 2009, but this was delayed for two months due to bad weather. It was planned for a second koru capsule, mirroring the first capsule, to be placed at Scott Base in 2011.

The book-length poem "Erebus" by American writer Jane Summer (Sibling Rivalry Press, 2015) memorialises a close friend who died in the tragedy, and in a feat of 'investigative poetry', explores the chain of flawed decisions that caused the crash.

In 2019, it was announced that a national memorial is to be installed in Parnell Rose Gardens, with a relative of one of the crash victims stating that it was the right place. However, local residents criticised the memorial's location, saying that it would "destroy the ambiance of the park". After numerous delays, construction was set to begin in October 2021. However, due to an investigation by the Ombudsman, construction was limited to reversible "preparation works". The delays were caused by protests against the construction, fearing that it could endanger the giant pōhutukawa in the park.

In March 2022, the Ombudsman released his report, stating that Ministry of Culture & Heritage "should have consulted more widely before forming its preference for a location," and that it "acted unreasonably in October 2019, when it failed to reply to correspondence about resource consent for the proposed memorial." Construction was halted upon the recommendation given, which "called for the ministry to resolve any grievances before construction begins." By 10 February 2023, the Ombudsman was satisfied by the actions taken to implement his recommendations.

However, the 2023 Auckland Anniversary Weekend floods and Cyclone Gabrielle led to "significant land slips occurring along the cliff line," including one in the vicinity of the memorial site. The geotechnical engineering assessment undertaken concluded that "the land was unsafe to build the memorial on", forcing them to abandon the plans to build the memorial in Parnell Rose Gardens, and to find a new memorial site. In November 2025, the Ministry announced its preferred new site for the national memorial was Cracroft Reserve in Christchurch. The Mayor of Christchurch, Phil Mauger, had previously offered two potential sites for the memorial, including Cracroft Reserve. Christchurch was to have been the first landing place of the plane on its return to New Zealand.

== In popular culture ==
The crash coincided with the Air New Zealand Shell Open, a golf tournament sponsored by Air New Zealand. CEO Morrie Davis was playing the pro-am when he first heard word that the plane was "lost." Air New Zealand thought about cancelling the tournament but decided against it.

A television miniseries, Erebus: The Aftermath, focusing on the investigation and the Royal Commission of Inquiry, was broadcast in New Zealand and Australia in 1988.

The phrase "an orchestrated litany of lies" entered New Zealand popular culture for some years.

In 2014, a feature-length docudrama, Operation Overdue, on the disaster was produced for TVNZ, focusing on the namesake recovery mission and 11 police officers who helped recover victims' bodies. In 2019, two in-depth podcast series were produced on the 40th anniversary of the disaster by Radio New Zealand and The New Zealand Herald.

The disaster features in the fifth episode of season two of The Weather Channel documentary series Why Planes Crash. The episode is titled "Sudden Impact", and it was first aired in January 2015.

In March 2026, the disaster was featured in an episode of the "Cautionary Tales" podcast.

== Official records ==
Material related to the Erebus disaster and inquiry is held (with other Antarctica items from the Antarctic Division of the (former) Department of Scientific and Industrial Research (DSIR)) by Archives New Zealand, Christchurch. There are 168 record items, of which twelve are restricted access (7 photos, 4 audio cassettes and 1 file of newspaper clippings from Air New Zealand).

Other files are held by Archives New Zealand at Auckland, Wellington, Christchurch and Dunedin. These include files of the Royal Commission (Agency AASJ, accession W2802) and the New Zealand Police (Agencies AAAJ, BBAN; many are restricted).

== See also ==
- Aviation accidents and incidents
- List of disasters in Antarctica by death toll
- Sensory illusions in aviation
- Similar accidents and incidents:
  - American Airlines Flight 965, a flight which crashed into terrain after the pilots altered the coordinates.
  - Aviateca Flight 901, a flight of the same number which also collided with a volcano.
  - Prinair Flight 277
  - Ansett New Zealand Flight 703
  - New Zealand National Airways Corporation Flight 441
  - Uruguayan Air Force Flight 571, another flight which crashed into terrain due to deviation from the planned flight route
