= Flight 771 =

Flight 771 may refer to:

Listed chronologically

- Alitalia Flight 771, crashed in India on 7 July 1962
- Gulf Air Flight 771, destroyed by a bomb over the United Arab Emirates on 23 September 1983
- Afriqiyah Airways Flight 771, crashed in Libya on 12 May 2010

== See also ==
- Mercy Mission: The Rescue of Flight 771, a 1993 American television movie about the 1978 Cessna 188 Pacific rescue
