= Kenneth Cope =

British actor (1931–2024)

- Cope in Randall and Hopkirk (Deceased)
- Born: Kenneth Charles Cope; 14 April 1931; Liverpool, Lancashire, England
- Died: 11 September 2024 (aged 93); Southport, Merseyside, England
- Occupation: Actor
- Years active: 1954–2009
- Spouse: Renny Lister (m. 1961)
- Children: 3, including Martha and Nick

Kenneth Charles Cope (14 April 1931 – 11 September 2024) was an English actor and scriptwriter. He was best known for his roles as Marty Hopkirk in Randall and Hopkirk (Deceased), Jed Stone in Coronation Street, Ray Hilton in Brookside, Sid in The Damned and as a minor member of the Carry On team.

== Early life ==
Kenneth Cope was born on 14 April 1931 in Wavertree, Liverpool (at the time in Lancashire, now in Merseyside), England.

== Career ==
After training to be an actor at the Bristol Old Vic Theatre School, Cope began playing character roles in films from the mid-1950s, and between 1961 and 1966 gained attention for his regular role in Coronation Street as the shady Jed Stone, a part he returned to in 2008. In May 1963 he issued a single with Tony Hatch on the Pye label, inspired by Mike Sarne, titled "Hands Off, Stop Mucking About" b/w "Why Am I So Shy". The single was credited to Ken Cope and the Breakaways. He boasted: "It'll get me a golden disc if one in every 24 folk who watch Coronation Street go out and buy the record." The record was not a success but it led to a regular slot as a disc jockey with Radio Luxembourg.

Cope also appeared in the satirical series That Was the Week That Was from 1962 until 1963.

He played Subutai in the 1965 film of the life of Genghis Khan, and in the same year appeared in Dateline Diamonds playing Lester Benson. In 1967 he appeared as Tom Savage in "The Bird Who Knew Too Much" episode of The Avengers.

In Randall and Hopkirk (Deceased) (1969–1970), Cope played the ghost private eye Marty Hopkirk opposite Mike Pratt's Jeff Randall.

He also took leading roles in two Carry On films. In Carry On at Your Convenience (1971) he played Vic Spanner, the obnoxious shop steward central to the film's trade union and industrial problems storyline and the rival in the film's romantic sub-plot. In Carry On Matron (1972) he took the more sympathetic role of Cyril Carter, the son of a thief who is forced to impersonate a female nurse as part of his father's attempt to rob a maternity hospital. Once there, Cyril finds love with a real nurse.

In an episode of the first series of The Adventures of Black Beauty, "Sailor on a Horse" (1972), he played Henry Thackery, a missing heir from Canada, returning from sea, just in time to save the land and Beauty's paddock next to the Gordon family, which greedy, contentious lawyer Weems tries to sell by fraud, palming one of his clerks off as being the true heir.

He appeared as Jack Victor in Catweazle ("The Wogle Stone") in 1971. In 1975–1976 he wrote three series of the BBC children's television series Striker, starring the young Kevin Moreton and inspired by the local youth football team in the village of Islip, Oxfordshire, where the Cope family was then living. Other screenwriting credits include A Sharp Intake of Breath.

Cope featured in three episodes of Minder playing different characters: newly released prisoner Albert Stubbs in "Bury My Half at Waltham Green"; 'Scooter' in "Waiting for Goddard"; and police informer Phelan in "Bring Me the Head of Arthur Daley".

He later appeared in the Doctor Who story Warriors' Gate (in 1981), and guest-starred in two episodes of Casualty, as well as taking roles in Juliet Bravo,The Bill, Waking the Dead, A Touch of Frost and Kavanagh QC.

In 1984, Cope starred in Bootle Saddles, a surreal sitcom about a failing themed 'cowboy village' on the outskirts of Merseyside. He played the lead character Percy James, who was passionate about the park despite the poor financial returns. The series appeared to be less a parody and more a sort of homage to 1950s and 1960s westerns, with episodes structured loosely around epics like High Noon and The Magnificent Seven. The characters rarely strayed out of their diegetic cowboy personas, despite the contemporary setting. The series was axed after one season.

In 1995 he appeared with his daughter Martha in an episode of Out of the Blue. In 1997 Cope played dodgy ex-copper Charlie Fairclough alongside David Jason in an episode of A Touch of Frost titled "True Confessions". From 1999 to 2002 he played Ray Hilton in the Channel 4 soap opera Brookside.

Cope was offered a cameo role in the 2000–2001 revival of Randall and Hopkirk starring Vic Reeves and Bob Mortimer, but turned it down. He did, however, feature on the "Behind the Scenes" section of the Series 1 DVD, wishing the cast of the remake well. He also provided the foreword to a Randall and Hopkirk Deceased retrospective book by Geoff Tibballs, published in 1994. In addition, an 'Appreciation', written by Cope, was included in the 2018 autobiography of Australian actress Annette Andre, Where Have I Been All My Life?.

Cope played Neville Harding in 2004's "Shadowplay" (Series 4, episodes 11 and 12 of Waking the Dead).

In 2008 Cope's Coronation Street character Jed Stone returned to the ITV soap after 42 years' absence, appearing as part of a storyline involving property developer Tony Gordon. The character was kept onscreen for several months before being written out again, and marked Kenneth Cope's final acting appearance.

== Personal life ==
Cope married actress Renny Lister, whom he had met when she worked on Coronation Street, in 1961. They had two sons and a daughter together and lived in Islip, Oxfordshire. Their sons Nick and Mark Cope went on to form a rock band, The Candyskins. Their daughter, Martha Cope, is an actress. In 1997, Lister announced her retirement.

In 1974, Cope and his wife opened a restaurant, in Watlington, Oxfordshire, named Martha's Kitchen after his daughter.

Cope was diagnosed with mesothelioma in 2000, but six years later he was told this was a misdiagnosis; he later suffered from chronic obstructive pulmonary disease.

In January 2014, Cope appeared as a character witness during the trial of former Coronation Street colleague William Roache, who plays Ken Barlow in the series.

In retirement Cope resided in Southport and wrote a weekly column for the weekly Southport Visiter newspaper. He was a loyal supporter of Everton F.C.

Cope died on 11 September 2024, aged 93.

== Filmography ==
- Impulse (1954) as hotel desk clerk (uncredited)
- The Gilded Cage (1955) as hotel receptionist (uncredited)
- Doublecross (1956) as Jeffrey
- X the Unknown (1956) as Private Lansing
- Dixon of Dock Green (1956) as Doug Beale
- Yangtse Incident: The Story of H.M.S. Amethyst (1957) as store's rating HMS Amethyst
- These Dangerous Years (1957) as the juggler
- Dunkirk (1958) as Lt. Lumpkin
- No Time to Die (1958) as 2nd English soldier
- Naked Fury (1959) as Johnny
- The Lady Is a Square (1959) as Dereck
- Jungle Street (1960) as Johnny
- The Criminal (1960) as Kelly
- The Unstoppable Man (1961) as Benny
- Edgar Wallace Mysteries, "Death Trap" (1962) as Derek Maitland
- Tomorrow at Ten (1962) as Sergeant Grey
- The Damned (1962) as Sid
- Carry On Jack (1963) as sailor (uncredited)
- Father Came Too! (1963) as Ron
- The One That Didn't Get Away (short) as car salesman
- Change Partners (1965) as Joe Trent
- Genghis Khan (1965) as Subotai
- Dateline Diamonds (1965) as Lester Benson
- A Letter from Liz (short)
- Night of the Big Heat (1967) as Tinker Mason
- Hammerhead (1968) as motorcyclist
- A Twist of Sand (1968) as Flag Officer
- The Desperados (1969) as Carlin
- A Touch of the Other (1970) as Delger
- She'll Follow You Anywhere (1971) as Mike Carter
- Carry On at Your Convenience (1971) as Vic Spanner
- Carry On Matron (1972) as Cyril Carter
- Rentadick (1972) as West
- Juggernaut (1974) as Bridgeman
- George and Mildred (1980) as Harvey
- Captives (1994) as Dr. Hockley
- The Swan Princess: Escape from Castle Mountain (1997) as Prince Derek (singing voice in "Far Longer than Forever")

== Television appearances ==
- BBC Sunday-Night Theatre, " The Duenna" (1953); "The Bridge" (1953) as Robert Nason; "The Stone Ship" (1959) as Leading Telegraphist Marshall
- Johnny, You're Wanted, "Blind Corner" (1953) as police constable
- Patrol Car, "The Lost Boy" (1955) as Tom
- Billy Bunter of Greyfriars School, "Bunter Knows How" (1955) and "Bunter the Bold" (1956) as Loder
- Dixon of Dock Green (1956–76), six episodes
- Big City, "Rogue Male" (1956) as Chuck
- Lucky Silver, "A Man Called Mickey" (1956) as Charlie
- Jesus of Nazareth (1956) as rich young man
- Whack-O! (1956) as F.D. Price-Whittaker
- The Adventures of Robin Hood, "The Mark" (1957) as Diccon; "An Apple for the Archer" (1957) as Timothy Cox; "Elixir of Youth"(1958) as Alwyn the squire
- Ivanhoe, "The Escape" (1958) as Warren
- ITV Television Playhouse, "Strictly for the Sparrows" (1958) as Tago; "The Cymbals at Your Door" (1959) as Bill Lewis; "A Kind of Freedom" (1959)
- ITV Play of the Week, "The Publican's Story" (1958) as Fred White; "In Search of Happiness" (1960) as Gennady
- No Hiding Place, "Wheels of Fury" (1959) as Blackie Martin
- Saturday Playhouse, "The Larford Lad" (1959) as Johnnie Baxter
- William Tell, "The Bandit" (1959) as Marco
- Boyd Q.C., "Confession of Murder" (1959)
- Kipps (1960) as Buggins
- Night on the Highway (1960 TV movie) as Maurizio Rossello
- Suspense, "Eight Feet to Midnight" (1960) as Joey Gallagher
- The Days of Vengeance, "Goodbye, Dolly Gray" (1960) as Reg Parrish
- Coronation Street (1961–1966, 2008–2009) as Jed Stone
- One Step Beyond, "The Villa" (1961) as Lionel
- Drama 61-67, "The Takers" (1961) as Boyd
- Deadline Midnight, "Before the Cock Crows" (1961) as Joey Lippert
- That Was the Week That Was (1962–1963)
- Studio 4, "North Flight" (1962) as Bill Lane
- First Night, "The One Night of the Year" (1963) as Johnny
- The Lance Percival Show (1965)
- World of His Own (1965)
- Z-Cars, "The Share Out" (1965) as Richie; "The Great Art Robbery" (1967) as Frankie Hancock
- Barney Is My Darling, "Weddings, Funerals and Christenings" (1966)
- The Avengers, "The Bird Who Knew Too Much" (1967) as Tom Savage; "The Curious Case of the Countless Clues" (1968) as Gardiner
- Sanctuary, "The Undefeated" (1967) as Charlie Musgrove
- Vendetta, "The Ten-Per-Cent Man" (1967) as Johnny
- Life with Cooper, "A Shortage of Money" (1968)
- We Have Ways of Making You Laugh (1968)
- Randall and Hopkirk (Deceased) (1969–1970) as Marty Hopkirk
- Catweazle, "The Wogle Stone" (1971) as Jack Victor
- The Adventures of Black Beauty, "Sailor on a Horse" (1973) ... as Thackeray
- Crown Court, "The Assault on Choga Sar" (1974) as Dennis Wainwright
- ITV Playhouse, "Love Affair" (1974) as Roche
- The Famous Five, "Five Are Together Again" (1978) as Sam
- Shelley (1979), "The Nelson Touch" and "Moving In" as Alan Forsyth
- Minder, "Bury My Half at Waltham Green" (1979) as Arthur Stubbs; "Waiting for Goddard" (1985) as Scooter; "Bring Me the Head of Arthur Daley" (1994) as Phelan.
- Play for Today, "The Vanishing Army" (1980) as drill sergeant
- George and Mildred (1980) as Harvey
- Juliet Bravo (1980–1985) as Freddie Cooper
- Levkas Man (1981) as Bert
- Doctor Who, "Warriors' Gate" (1981) as Packard
- Strangers, "A Free Weekend in the Country" (1982) as Det. Chief Supt. Miller
- Thank You, Mrs. Clinkscales (TV Movie, 1984) as Hogan
- Bootle Saddles (1984) as Percy James
- There Comes a Time (1985) as stonemason
- The Practice (1986) as Stanley O'Dowd
- King and Castle, "Exodus" (1986) as Ernest Midgeley
- Miss Marple: Sleeping Murder (TV movie, 1987) as Jackie Afflick
- Rumpole of the Bailey, "Rumpole and the Judge's Elbow" (1987) as Norman
- Truckers (1987), as Stubs
- City Lights, "Moonlighting" (1987) as Dicky Rainbow
- Hollywood Sports (1988) as Roger Marshall
- Casualty, "Desperate Odds" (1988) as Archie Higg; "Value for Monday" (1994) as Les Hocknall
- The Return of the Antelope, "Home Again" (1988) as foreman
- Bergerac, "Natural Enemies" (1989) as Ted Swinton
- Uncle Jack, "Oil" (1990) as Colonel Groves
- Making News, "Line of Fire" (1990) as Mac Thorpe
- The Bill, "It's a Small World" (1991) as PC Len Dorton; "Sequence of Events" (2006) as Jimmy Hastings
- Lovejoy, "Somewhere – Over the Rainbow?" (1994) as John Ikin
- Out of the Blue, "Last Bus To Nowhere" (1995) as Mr. Flood
- Medics, "Second Chance" (1995) as Roy Banks
- Wales Playhouse, "Archangel Night Out" (1995) as Vern
- 99-1, "A Game of Two Halves" (1995) as Ordell
- Respect (TV movie, 1996) as Stan Peters
- A Touch of Frost, "True Confessions" (1997) as Charlie Fairclough
- Goodnight Sweetheart, "The Leaving of Liverpool" (1997) as landlord
- Kavanagh QC, "Time of Need" (1999) as Maurice Fitzalan
- Brookside (1999–2002) as Ray Hilton
- Last of the Summer Wine, "The Love Mobile" (1997) and "All That Glitters Is Not Elvis" (2008) as Lance
- Waking the Dead, "Shadowplay" (2004) as Neville Harding
- Doctors, "Too Darn Hot" (2004) as Brian Holland and "Invisible Touch" (2007) as Frank Leakey
- The Royal, "Dr Who?" (2007) as Albert Trent
- Hustle, "Getting Even" (2007) as Colin
- The Royal Today, Episode 1.15 (2008) as William Brazier
