= Jetconnect =

Airline of New Zealand (2002–2018)

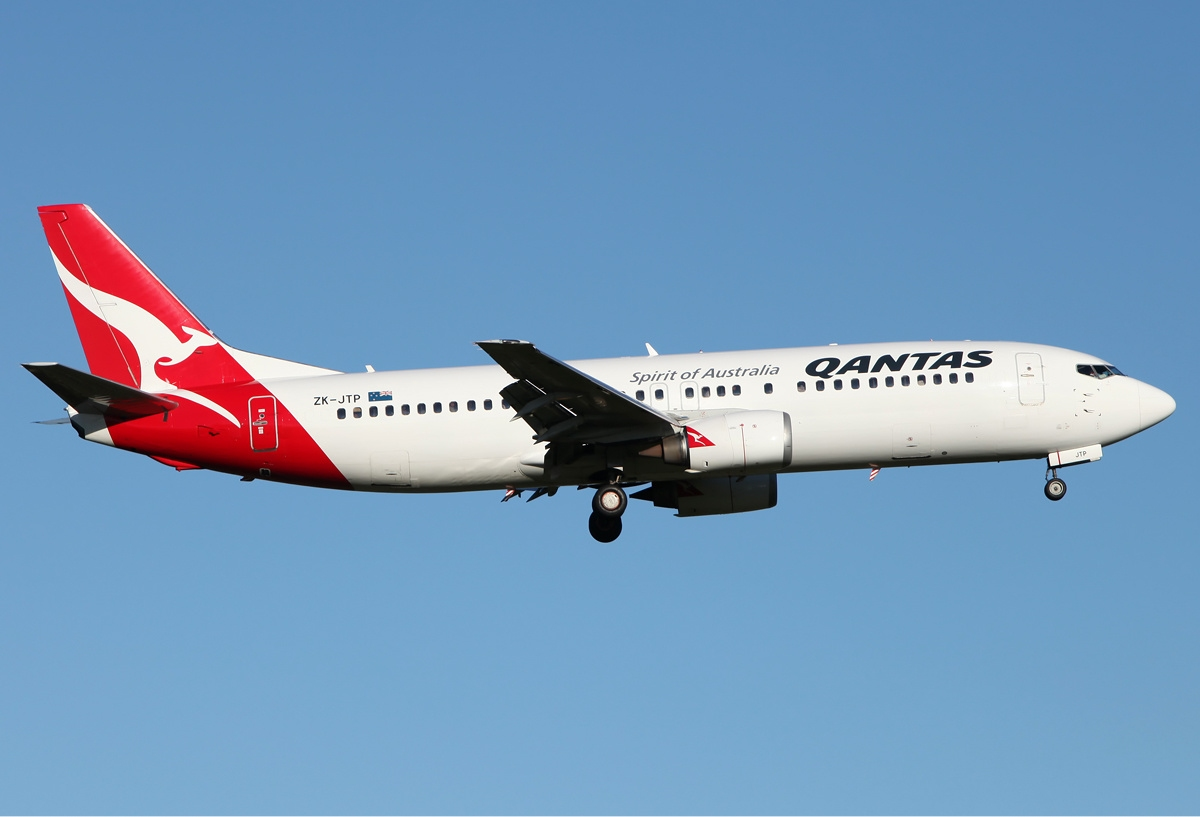
- Jetconnect Boeing 737-400 in 2010
IATA	ICAO	Call sign
QF	QFA	QANTAS
- Founded: July 2002
- Commenced operations: October 2002
- Operating bases: Auckland; Wellington; Christchurch
- Frequent-flyer program: Qantas Frequent Flyer
- Alliance: Oneworld
- Fleet size: 7 (December 2017)
- Destinations: 8
- Parent company: Qantas
- Headquarters: Auckland, New Zealand
- Employees: 120 (December 2017)

Jetconnect is a New Zealand airline owned by Qantas. Established in July 2002 as an airline, it ceased operating as an airline in 2018 but continues to employ pilots and cabin crew based at Auckland, Wellington and Christchurch airports that operate Qantas flights on Trans-Tasman services between New Zealand and Australia, with cabin crew also operating on Qantas long-haul flights alongside Australian-based crew.

== History ==
Jetconnect was established by Qantas in July 2002, commencing operations in October the same year as a New Zealand-based airline. It operated domestic services within New Zealand until 10 June 2009, when these services were taken over by fellow Qantas subsidiary Jetstar. Jetconnect then operated Trans-Tasman services between New Zealand and Australia under the Qantas brand with New Zealand-based crew.

From mid 2001 to early 2004, JetConnect operated a codeshare agreement with Origin Pacific Airways. When this ceased, Origin lost 60% of its business.

In November 2018, Jetconnect transferred its fleet of Boeing 737 aircraft back to Qantas and ceased to operate as an airline, though the company continues to employ pilots and cabin crew to operate trans-tasman and international services for Qantas.

== Destinations ==
=== International short-haul ===
Jetconnect short-haul pilots and cabin crew operate the majority of Qantas-marketed flights from Auckland, Christchurch, Queenstown and Wellington to Australian east-coast destinations.

- From Auckland
  - Brisbane
  - Melbourne
  - Sydney
- From Christchurch
  - Brisbane
  - Melbourne
  - Sydney
- From Wellington
  - Melbourne
  - Sydney
- From Queenstown
  - Sydney
  - Brisbane (seasonal)
  - Melbourne (seasonal)

=== Domestic ===
Jetconnect operated domestic flights in New Zealand until 9 June 2009. The final domestic service was QF2728 from Wellington to Auckland. Domestic services included routes between Auckland, Wellington, Rotorua, Christchurch and Queenstown. Services between Auckland, Christchurch, Queenstown and Wellington have been replaced with Jetstar services. Services to Rotorua were discontinued.

== Fleet ==
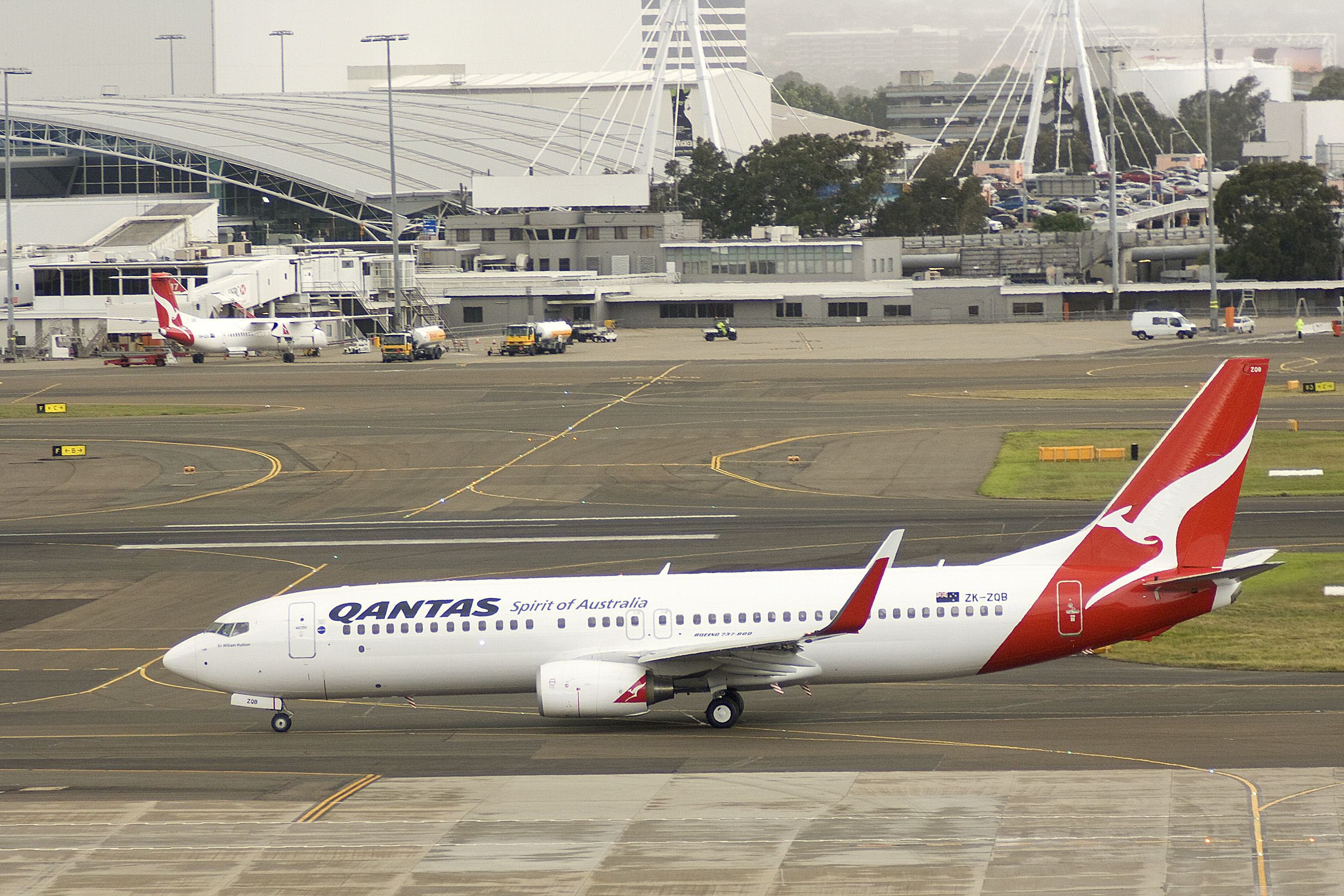
Jetconnect Boeing 737-800 at Sydney Airport

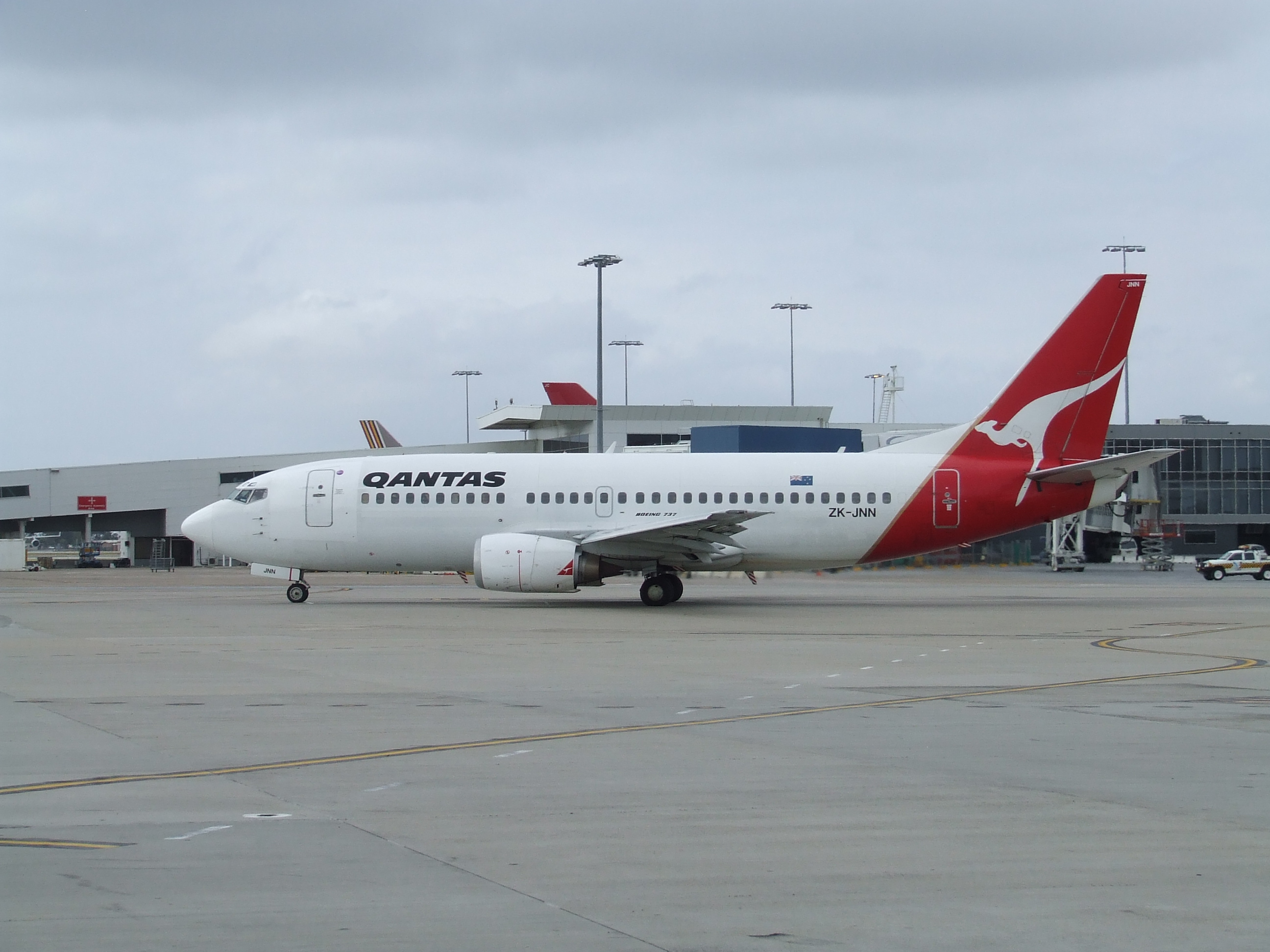
Jetconnect Boeing 737-300 at Sydney Airport in original basic Qantas livery

In November 2018, all seven Jetconnect Boeing 737-800 aircraft were transferred to Qantas.

Jetconnect previously operated the following Boeing 737 series aircraft:

Aircraft	Total	Introduced	Retired	Notes
Boeing 737-300	13	2002	2009	
Boeing 737-400	4	2006	2011	
Boeing 737-800	8	2009	2018	

== Industrial relations ==
On 17 May 2006, the union representing Australian Qantas pilots, the Australian and International Pilots Association (AIPA), lodged an application to the Australian industrial relations commission Fair Work Australia, seeking to alter its eligibility rules to enable the enrolment of Jetconnect pilots in the union. On 23 May 2007, the commission ruled against the union, declining to consider the question, considering it inappropriate for the AIPA to be able to enrol New Zealand–based Jetconnect pilots, as they were already eligible to be members of the New Zealand Air Line Pilots' Association.

In December 2009, the AIPA took Jetconnect parent Qantas to Fair Work Australia, accusing the company of deliberately driving down wages and conditions, by undermining the spirit and intent of the Australian Fair Work Act. The AIPA accused Qantas of paying Jetconnect pilots 40 percent less than Qantas pilots, who six months earlier had been flying the majority of the airline's trans-Tasman services. Qantas was confident that it would win the case, stating: "These are New Zealand pilots operating New Zealand-originated services flying New Zealand-registered aircraft operated by a New Zealand entity".

In May 2010, Fair Work Australia president Justice Geoffrey Giudice agreed to convene a full bench to hear the application, and in July 2010, the Australian Council of Trade Unions (ACTU) was granted leave to intervene in the case after the ACTU argued that the outcome would have major ramifications for labour hire practice in Australia. The ACTU made its final submission regarding the case in March 2011, and in a majority decision handed down in September 2011 Fair Work Australia dismissed the AIPA's application.

In June 2011, the ABC program Hungry Beast produced a parody television advertisement for Qantas, highlighting the use of Jetconnect for its trans-Tasman flights.
