= Gordon Vette =

New Zealand airline captain (1933- 2015)

Gordon Vette ONZM
- Born: Alwyn Gordon Vette; 9 July 1933; New Zealand
- Died: 9 August 2015 (aged 82); Auckland, New Zealand
- Known for: Rescue of Cessna 188; Research into the cause of the Air New Zealand Flight 901 crash
- Relatives: Mark Vette (son)
- Awards: Johnston Memorial Trophy for outstanding air navigation from GAPAN; Jim Collins Memorial Award for Exceptional Contribution to Flight Safety; NZALPA honorary life membership; IFALPA Presidential Citation; Honorary Engineering Doctorate from the University of Glasgow; Officer of the New Zealand Order of Merit
- Aviation career
- Famous flights: Air New Zealand Flight 103
- Flight license: New Zealand
- Air force: Royal New Zealand Air Force

Alwyn Gordon Vette ONZM (9 July 1933 – 9 August 2015) was a New Zealand airline captain best known for his involvement in the Cessna 188 Pacific rescue and his research into the cause of the Air New Zealand Flight TE901 crash. He spent five years in the Royal New Zealand Air Force (RNZAF) and 55 years as a commercial pilot. Vette was portrayed by Roy Billing in the 1988 miniseries Erebus: the Aftermath, which recounts Vette's research into the cause of the Mount Erebus Disaster; and by Robert Loggia in the 1993 TV movie Mercy Mission: The Rescue of Flight 771, which recounts Vette's experiences piloting Air New Zealand Flight 103.

== Career ==
Vette joined Air New Zealand (at that point known as Tasman Empire Airways Limited – TEAL) as an engineering apprentice in 1948 at 15 years of age. At the same time, he began flying training at Auckland Aero Club. Soon after, Vette spent a five-year service commission in the RNZAF as a flying instructor, earning A1 and A military and civilian flight instructor ratings, respectively.

Upon his return to ANZ in 1958, Vette served as first officer on a Douglas DC-6, simultaneously working towards his Flight Navigator Licence and Airline Transport Pilot Licence. By 1960, he was in command of his first aircraft. He was also chosen as a check pilot and captain for the Lockheed L-188 Electra and Douglas DC-3 (in 1964), the Douglas DC-8 (in 1965), and the McDonnell Douglas DC-10 (in 1972), as well as a flight instructor for the DC-10.

Vette left Air New Zealand as a result of their disapproval at his comments on the Mount Erebus Disaster. He retired from the Civil Aviation Authority of New Zealand in October 2003.

== Rescue of Cessna 188 ==
On 21 December 1978, Cessna 188 pilot Jay Prochnow radioed in a Mayday call to air traffic control. Prochnow, previously a pilot in the United States Navy, had lost his bearings on a flight from Pago Pago to Norfolk Island when his Automatic Direction Finder (ADF) malfunctioned. At the same time, Gordon Vette was serving as captain of ANZ Flight 103 from Nadi to Auckland (with his first officer Arthur Dovey and flight engineer Gordon Brooks), making him the closest person to Prochnow that air traffic control could find. Vette agreed to help in the search for the lost Cessna.

Vette's DC-10 was not carrying any instruments designed for search and rescue, so the two pilots were forced to get creative. The captain could roughly estimate Prochnow's position relative to his plane by comparing their relative headings when facing the sun and solar angles of elevation. Next, Vette began to triangulate the Cessna's location using the 200-mile range of its VHF radio. Vette also tried dumping 24,000 pounds of fuel from his own aircraft in the hope that Prochnow might be able to see it, but this proved to be unsuccessful. Prochnow and Vette then compared the time at which each of them observed the sun to set, and the addition of this new information finally made it possible for the Cessna's position to be calculated. After 23 hours of flying, and almost out of fuel—having used a lower speed to stretch out the Cessna's usual 22 hours of fuel—Prochnow landed safely at Norfolk Island.

In 1980, the Guild of Air Pilots and Air Navigators awarded Vette the Johnston Memorial Trophy for outstanding air navigation in recognition of his performance in the rescue. A fictionalized account of the event was made into a TV movie in 1993. The film, Mercy Mission: The Rescue of Flight 771, starred Robert Loggia as Gordon Vette and Scott Bakula as Jay Perkins (changed from Prochnow).

== Research into Air New Zealand Flight 901 crash ==
By 1977, Air New Zealand had introduced a limited series of DC-10 flights over Antarctica as an exciting sightseeing trip for those who could afford it. Each flight was captained by one of Air New Zealand's most skilled pilots, and commentary was provided by famous antarctic explorers such as Sir Edmund Hillary or Peter Mulgrew. Jim Collins served as the captain of Flight TE901, the last scheduled flight of this series. The flight engineer was Gordon Brooks, who had served as Vette's flight engineer on Air New Zealand flight 103 during the Cessna 188 rescue.

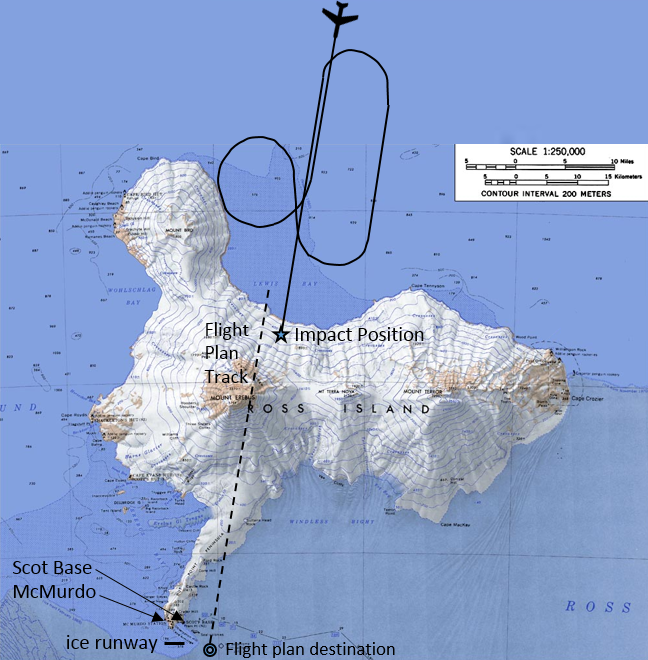
Map showing Air New Zealand Flight 901's flight path and its impact site on Mt. Erebus

Flight TE901 took off on 29 November 1979. As the plane descended to sightseeing altitude upon reaching Antarctica, the ground proximity warning system (GPWS) went off seemingly out of nowhere. The flight crew barely had a chance to react before TE901 slammed into the side of Mount Erebus, killing everyone on board.

The initial Transport Accident Investigation Commission (TAIC) report on the accident prepared by Chief Inspector of Air Accidents Ron Chippindale and released on 30 May 1980 initially blamed the crash on pilot error, but Vette challenged this finding. He had trained Collins himself and found it unlikely that he would exhibit that level of negligence. In an interview some years after the accident, Vette described Collins as "one of the most cautious pilots in the world." In fact, it was soon discovered that the airline changed Flight 901's route, after the flight briefing without informing Collins, putting Mt. Erebus directly in its path. Vette hypothesized that the crash might be due to any combination of three factors: first, that the route had been changed from the open expanse of McMurdo Sound to right over Mt. Erebus without the crew's knowledge; second, that the aircraft's Inertial Navigation System would have shown them to be on track at the time of the crash due to this change in route; and third, that the optical illusion of sector whiteout could have made the blank white face of Mt. Erebus appear to be the snowy plains of McMurdo sound, leading the crew to believe that they were still following the route that every other flight had taken. Unwilling to let the blame for the accident be unfairly assigned to the flight crew, Vette consulted with experts and conducted extensive research in order to discover the truth.

Due in part to public discontent and in part to a campaign for re-examination by Vette himself, a Royal Commission of Inquiry was formed on 7 July 1980 to examine the TAIC's finding of pilot error. Vette's research, along with other evidence, was presented to High Court Judge Peter Mahon, who was in charge of the commission. Vette served as an adviser to Mahon during the proceedings, and his findings proved especially influential. Justice Mahon even took a helicopter ride to Mt. Erebus during the course of his investigation to experience the phenomenon of sector whiteout for himself. As he later described it, "I was taken for a flight myself in white out conditions and saw with my own eyes the flat terrain of ice and snow stretching forth for more than forty miles when in fact right in front of us there was a snow ridge several hundred feet high". Mahon's final report was published on 27 April 1981, and it largely agreed with Vette's hypotheses. Mahon found Air New Zealand to be financially responsible, describing their attempts to shift the blame on to the late flight crew as "very clearly part of an attempt to conceal a series of disastrous administrative blunders". Air New Zealand appealed the ruling to the New Zealand Court of Appeal, and, although the financial penalties were ultimately removed, the court declined to overturn any of Mahon's factual findings.

Though the truth of the Flight TE901 crash eventually won out, the cost to its defenders was high. Mahon believed that the partial overturning of his findings meant that his fellow justices had lost faith in his abilities, and he resigned in 1982. Vette's career also suffered, as his crusade for truth had ended friendships and caused conflicts with Air New Zealand, his employer at the time. He was eventually driven to an early exit from the company he had worked for since 1948.

In recognition of Vette's efforts, the New Zealand Air Line Pilots' Association (NZALPA) awarded him an honorary lifetime membership in 1984 and the first Jim Collins Memorial Award for Exceptional Contribution to Flight Safety award in 1991. In 1984, Mahon wrote a book about the events of the Royal Commission of Inquiry into the crash titled Verdict on Erebus. The book was adapted into the TV miniseries; Erebus: The Aftermath in 1988, with Frank Finlay starring as Justice Mahon and Roy Billing as Captain Vette. The serial won five New Zealand Film and Television Awards, including Best Drama Programme and Best Drama Series.

== Publications ==
Vette published two books on the Mount Erebus Disaster: Impact Erebus in 1983 and Impact Erebus II with John MacDonald in 1999. Impact Erebus II also came with a videotape about the crash and the events that followed, featuring interviews with Justice Mahon and others involved.

== Legacy ==
Vette's findings on the crash of Flight TE901 were highly influential in advancing air safety and accident prevention in general. In an interview on the Impact Erebus Two videotape, Peter Mahon said, "An overseas expert in jet training and jet operations has said that this report has made the world a safer place to fly in. Well if that is so, that is due to the persistence of Gordon Vette and the evidence he produced which directed me and counsel of the Royal Commission onto the right path." In particular, Vette introduced the concepts of "human factors" and "organizational accidents" into the language of accident analysis and prevention. These terms still remain in use today as important considerations in airline safety. The International Civil Aviation Organisation (ICAO) used Vette's report as an example of how a combination of organizational failures could cause an accident, calling it "10 years ahead of its time" and adding that if its lessons had been heeded, "Chernobyl, Bhopal, Clapham Junction, King’s Cross and certainly the Dryden Report would not have existed".

In addition to his conceptual contributions to accident prevention, Vette also recommended necessary instrumental improvements. He was also one of the first to suggest adding forward-looking capabilities to the GPWS, since the lack of such a function left the crew of Flight TE901 with a mere six seconds to react before they crashed into Mt. Erebus. These recommendations were a factor in the development of enhanced ground proximity warning systems (EGPWS) in the 1990s and terrain awareness and warning system (TAWS) with forward-looking capabilities since then. TAWS systems are widely recommended by international airline safety organizations such as the United States Federal Aviation Administration (FAA), and TAWS systems were installed in 95% of commercial jets worldwide by 2007.

Vette has received much appreciation and acclaim for his contributions to the aviation industry. On 16 July 1988, the University of Glasgow awarded Vette with an honorary Engineering Doctorate in recognition of this, calling him an "outstanding role model" and "a man of undoubted integrity, a highly trained and gifted pilot, with an inquisitive, deductive brain of high intellect." On 20 September 2007, Vette was appointed an Officer of the New Zealand Order of Merit (ONZM) "for services to aviation." In March 2009, the International Federation of Air Line Pilots' Associations (IFALPA) awarded Vette with a Presidential Citation.
