= Flight 103 (disambiguation) =

Flight 103 commonly refers to Pan Am Flight 103, blown up in 1988 by a bomb (the "Lockerbie bombing").

Flight 103 may also refer to:

Listed chronologically

- Air New Zealand Flight 103, a DC-10 that helped find a lost Cessna in the Pacific, 1978
- Far Eastern Air Transport Flight 103, a midair break-up of a Boeing 737 over Taiwan, 1981
- Copterline Flight 103, Sikorsky helicopter crashed into the Gulf of Finland, 2005
- Buddha Air Flight 103, Beechcraft crashed on approach to Tribhuwan International Airport, Kathmandu, Nepal, 2011

== See also ==
- STS-103, a successful Space Shuttle mission in December 1999
- The Tragedy of Flight 103: The Inside Story, a 1990 television drama film about the Lockerbie bombing
