= Wembley (disambiguation) =

Wembley is a suburb of the London Borough of Brent, England.

Wembley may also refer to:

- the English national football stadium located in Wembley, London:
  - Wembley Stadium, the current stadium, opened in 2007 on the site of the 1923 stadium
  - Wembley Stadium (1923), the former stadium, built in 1923, demolished in 2003
- Wembley Arena, an indoor arena adjacent to Wembley Stadium
- Wembley Park, a suburban area in north-east Wembley, London
- Wembley, Western Australia, a suburb of the Australian city of Perth
- Wembley, Alberta, a town in northern Alberta province, Canada
- Wembley Fraggle, a character in the TV series Fraggle Rock and Fraggle Rock: The Animated Series
- "Wembley", 1993 song by the Candyskins from Fun?
