= Monday Morning =

Monday Morning may refer to:

== Music ==
- Monday Morning (band), an American Christian rock band
- "Monday Morning" (Fleetwood Mac song), 1975
- "Monday Morning" (Melanie Fiona song), 2009
- "Monday Morning", a folk song most famously sung by Peter, Paul and Mary on the 1965 album A Song Will Rise
- "Monday Morning", a song by the Candyskins from Sunday Morning Fever, 1996
- "Monday Morning", a song by Christina Aguilera from Bionic, 2010
- "Monday Morning", a song by Death Cab for Cutie from Codes and Keys, 2011
- "Monday Morning", a song by Pulp from Different Class, 1995
- "Monday Morning", a song by Robyn from My Truth, 1999
- "On a Monday Morning", a song by Cyril Tawney on his 1966 Electra anthology A Cold Wind Blows.

== Other ==
- Monday Morning (company), a think tank with headquarters in Copenhagen
- Monday Morning (1990 film), a film by Don Murphy also known as Class of Fear
- Monday Morning (2002 film), a film by Otar Iosseliani
- Monday Morning, a 2012 film by Nat Christian
- Monday Morning (magazine), a Lebanese English-language magazine
- Monday Morning (newsletter), a student media platform at NIT Rourkela, India
- Monday Morning, a 1925 novel by Patrick Hamilton
- Monday Mornings, a 2013 American medical drama television series
