= Vette (surname) =

Vette is a German language surname. Notable people with the name include:

- Clayton Vette (1988), American professional basketball player
- Gordon Vette (1933–2015), New Zealand airline captain
- Vicky Vette (1965), Norwegian-Canadian pornographic actress
