= O2 Academy Oxford =

Music venue in Oxford, England

Coordinates: 51.7471°N 1.2352°W

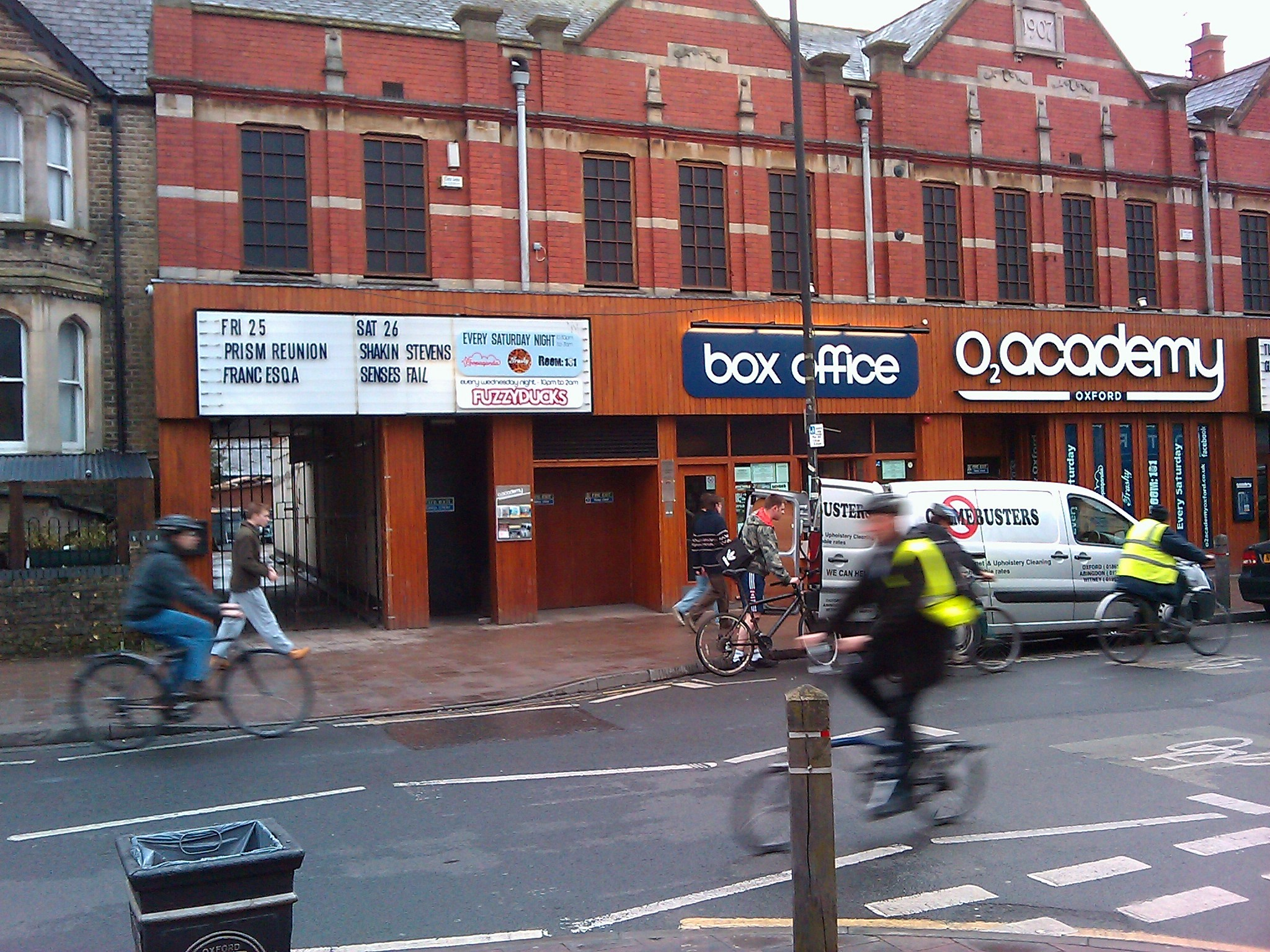
The O2 Academy in Oxford.

The O2 Academy Oxford is a night club and live music venue in Oxford, England, operated by Academy Music Group.

Its previous names include the Coop Hall, the Oxford Venue, the Zodiac and the Carling Academy Oxford.

== History ==
=== Oxford Co-operative Society (1907–1990) ===
The red brick building at 190–196 Cowley Road in southeast Oxford was designed by Harry Wilkinson Moore and built in 1907 for the Oxford Co-operative Society. It consisted of a large hall above three shop units. The hall was used for dances, political meetings of the Co-operative Party and live music. The year of construction is visible as a datestone on the front central gable.

=== The Oxford Venue (1990–1995) ===
The hall was sold in 1990 and converted into the Oxford Venue. Oxford band Radiohead played there and the video for their 1992 hit Creep was shot there.

=== The Zodiac (1995–2007) ===
In November 1995 it was refurbished and reopened as The Zodiac under new owners Adrian Hicks and Nick Moorbath, both formerly sound engineers and promoters working at the Oxford Venue. Moorbath was also a session keyboardist who played with Ride and Hurricane #1. The refit was partly funded by Radiohead and Supergrass. Moorbath was also involved in organising Radiohead's homecoming performance in South Park, Oxford in July 2001. In November 2006 it was announced that Moorbath and Hicks had agreed to sell the club to the Academy Music Group. The Zodiac's last night on 17 May 2007 featured several Oxford bands, including ones that reformed for the night, including The Candyskins and Unbelievable Truth. The commercial takeover of the city's largest independent music venue inspired Anyone Can Play Guitar, a documentary film about the Oxford music scene.

=== Academy Oxford (since 2007) ===
Academy Music Group refurbished the site over several months, increasing its capacity from 750 to 1,150 people and reopening as the Carling Academy Oxford. The sponsorship of the Academy Music Group by the Carling beer brand was succeeded by an agreement with telecommunications firm O2. The venue was rebranded as the O2 Academy Oxford with effect from 1 January 2009.
