= Renny Lister =

British actress (born 1934)

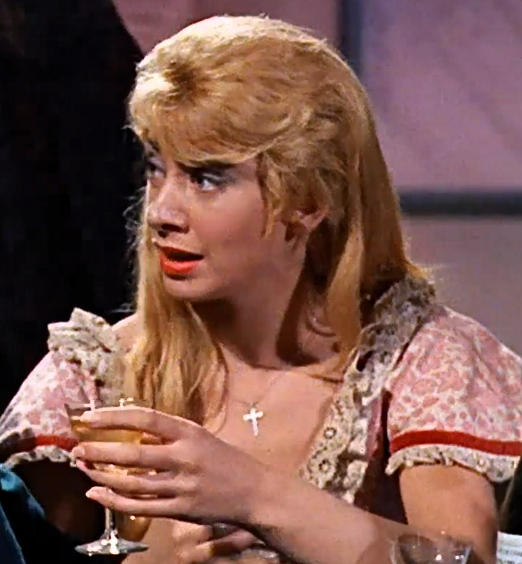
- Lister in The Curse of the Werewolf (1961)
- Born: Renee Soloman; 24 May 1934 (age 92); Manchester, England
- Occupations: Film and television actress
- Years active: 1958-2006
- Spouses: Eric Lister (m. 1953, divorced); Kenneth Cope (m. 1961; died 2024)
- Children: 3, including Martha and Nick Cope

Renny Lister (born 24 May 1934) is a British retired film and television actress.

== Personal life ==
Lister was born on 24 May 1934 in Manchester. She married Eric Lister in 1953, the marriage later ended in divorce although she retained her first husband's name as her stage name. Lister married film and television actor Kenneth Cope in 1961. They had two sons and one daughter together. Their sons Nick and Mark Cope went on to form a rock band, The Candyskins. Their daughter, Martha Cope, is an actress.

Her husband Kenneth Cope died at the age of 93 in 2024.

Her last appearance on TV was in an episode of children's television series The New Worst Witch

== Selected filmography ==
Lister appeared in numerous TV Shows and movies over her 47-year acting career.

This following Filmography does not include all the TV Shows and films she has appeared in and is a condensed list.

=== Film ===
- The Curse of the Werewolf (1961)
- A Touch of the Other (1970)
- Personal Services (1987)

=== Television ===
- Coronation Street (1961)
- The Desperate People (Episodes 1 – 6 as Ruth Sanders 1963)
- The Massingham Affair (1964)
- Dr. Finlay's Casebook (Episode: The Spinster, 1965)
- Edgar Wallace Mysteries (Episode: Dead Man's Chest, Flora, 1965)
- Sergeant Cork
- Bowler
- Holding On
- Don't Forget to Write!
- Callan
- The New Worst Witch
