= Sarah Kemp =

Sarah Kemp may refer to:

- Sarah Kemp (actress) (1937–2015), Australian actress
- Sarah Kemp (golfer) (born 1985), Australian professional golfer
- Sarah Kemp (figure skater) (born 1983), English pair skater
- Sarah Brady (1942–2015), née Kemp, American gun control advocate

== See also ==
- Kemp, Texas, a city in Kaufman County, Texas, named for Sara Kemp, the mother of the town's first postmaster
