= Anyone Can Play Guitar (film) =

- DVD release cover
- Directed by: Jon Spira
- Written by: Jon Spira
- Produced by: Jon Spira; Hank Starrs
- Cinematography: John Hunt; Gary Shenton; Jon Spira; Danjel Starborg; John Twycross
- Edited by: Ben Lavington-Martin; Jon Spira; John Twycross
- Release date: October 2010
- Running time: 124 minutes
- Country: United Kingdom
- Language: English

Anyone Can Play Guitar is a documentary film made by Jon Spira, examining the music scene in Oxford over the period starting 1978, but focusing on 1984–2007. The film takes its name from the song by Radiohead from their 1993 album Pablo Honey.

Through over 300 hours of interviews with band members and other key people in the Oxford music community, distilled down to one and a half hours, the film examines the roles of community, the music industry, and luck in a band gaining commercial success.

Narrated by Stewart Lee, it features interviews and concert footage of several bands that have been nationally and internationally successful (Radiohead, Supergrass, Foals), as well as some that had moderate success (e.g. The Candyskins, Ride, Swervedriver), and many more that were not commercially successful including The Cornflower Concept.

Creation of the film was initially through a Production Award from Film Oxford as well as self-funded by Spira, but finishing the sound mix and picture grade to a professional standard needed additional funding, which Spira sought through the Indiegogo crowd funding site. The initial target of $15,000 was reached before the campaign closing date, and the campaign was extended to $30,000 to raise funds for final music and film footage rights clearance.

== Release ==
Previews were screened at the OX4 music festival in October 2010, as part of Oxfam's Oxjam musical fund-raising initiative, and at an industry screening in April 2011.

The film's ticket-only premiere – for an audience of 300 donors and participants in the film – was on 20 September 2011 at Oxford's Phoenix Picturehouse.

The BFI screened the London premiere on 31 October 2011, followed by a Q&A session with Spira, Ed O'Brien of Radiohead, Gaz Coombes of Supergrass, Mark Gardener of Ride, and Nick Cope of The Candyskins, hosted by Adam Buxton.

The film's DVD release was set as 31 October 2011, supported by a tour of independent cinemas.
