= Noel Davis =

British actor (1927–2002)

- Born: Edgar Davis; 1 March 1927; Liverpool, Lancashire, England
- Died: 24 November 2002 (aged 75); Chelsea, Greater London, England
- Occupations: Actor; casting director
- Years active: 1952–2000

Noel Davis (born Edgar Davis; 1 March 1927 – 24 November 2002) was a British film and television actor; and latterly, a film and television casting director.

== Partial filmography ==
=== Film ===
- Darling (1965) - Shop Assistant (uncredited)
- Fahrenheit 451 (1966) - Charles (uncredited)
- Two a Penny (1967) - Dennis Lancaster
- Isadora (1968) - Doctor
- Journey into Darkness (1968) - Charles Philips (episode 'Paper Dolls')
- Some Will, Some Won't (1970) - Stewart
- Clegg (1970) - Manager
- A Touch of the Other (1970) - Max Ronieau
- Macbeth (1971) - Seyton
- Freelance (1971) - Derek
- The Trouble with 2B (1972)
- Young Winston (1972) - Interviewer
- Yellow Dog (1976) - Norman
- Prick Up Your Ears (1987) - Philip

=== Television ===
- The Diary of Samuel Pepys (1958) – Hawley
