= Aviones de Colombia AC-05 Pijao =

Colombian agricultural aircraft of the 1990s

AC-05 Pijao

General information
- Type: Agricultural aircraft
- National origin: Colombia
- Manufacturer: Aviones de Colombia; Texlond
- Number built: 15

History
- First flight: 10 April 1991
- Developed from: Cessna 188

The Aviones de Colombia AC-05 Pijao is an agricultural aircraft manufactured in Colombia in the 1990s. It was developed to fill a gap in the local market after Cessna discontinued production of the Cessna 188 that Aviones de Colombia (Aviodeco for short) had been assembling and supporting. Although the Pijao resembles the Cessna 188 in appearance and role, it was, at least to some degree, a new design. (Note: Descriptions of the degree of similarity between the two types range from there being only small differences ("El Pijao, armado por Aviones de Colombia, era idéntico al Cessna Ag-Truck, con ligeras modificaciones..." — "The Pijao, assembled by Aviones de Colombia, was identical to the Cessna Ag-Truck, with slight modifications") to describing the Pijao as an "all new" design.) "Pijao" is the name of an indigenous people of Colombia.

== Design and development ==
The Pijao is a low-wing, strut-braced monoplane of conventional design, with a single seat in an enclosed cabin. It has fixed, tailwheel undercarriage and is powered by a piston engine in the nose driving a tractor propeller. Construction is of metal throughout, with the cabin surrounded by a steel tube structure. Compared to the Cessna 188 which inspired it, the Pijao fuselage has improved aerodynamics to improve airflow around the wing struts and tail surfaces. It also features a new wing fairing and ailerons that move together with the flaps for take-off.

During the 1970s and 80s, Aviodeco marketed the Cessna 188 in Colombia, and provided parts and maintenance for the type. Support eventually extended to assembling and partially building the aircraft for the local market. In 1984, Cessna decided to end production of piston-engined types, including the 188. Aviodeco continued support, but was also aware of a persisting demand for new aircraft. The company therefore decided to produce its own aircraft to fill the gap.

Work on the design commenced in 1988, with the prototype HK-3631-X first flying on 10 April 1991. The Colombian Departamento Administrativo de Aeronáutica Civil (DAAC, Civil Aviation Department) awarded it a type certificate on 5 July that year. Certification in the US was infeasible because although the Pijao shared many components in common with the Cessna 188, components manufactured under licence in Colombia all required re-certification in the US. Outside Colombia, certification was also obtained in Bolivia and Brazil. In 1993, Aviodeco planned to build two Pijaos per month, but built only 15 in total before ceasing business in the late 1990s.

In 1999, Argentine businessman Raúl Siri purchased the assets of Aviodeco at auction. These included documentation, drawings, components, certificates, licences, jigs, and major airframe sections. This latter category included partial wings, plus fuselages for Pijaos and AgTrainers (a two-seat version of the Cessna 188 that Aviodeco being built under licence).

In 2001, Siri founded Texlond Corporation to continue production. Texlond originally planned to produce the aircraft in Pergamino, Argentina, but economic conditions in Argentina at the time (Note: see: 1998–2002 Argentine great depression) precluded this. Therefore, Texlond opened its factory in Fray Bentos, Uruguay instead, and commenced operations in 2003. The company faced several significant early obstacles, including discovering that shipments of Aviodeco assets to Uruguay had arrived incomplete, that Fray Bentos lacked an airfield, and that warehouse leasing was significantly more expensive than anticipated. Texlond also learned that licences and permits obtained for Colombia were not valid in Uruguay. Critically, these included the rights to manufacture Cessna parts used in the AgTrainer and Pijao.

Texron pursued Uruguay certification for the Pijao, and purchased and refurbished an Aviodeco-built example as the prototype, registered CX-XRC-X. Uruguay's Dirección Nacional de Aviación Civil e Infraestructura Aeronáutica (DINACIA, National Directorate of Civil Aviation and Aeronautical Infrastructure) awarded certification in 2007.

However, by 2008, Texlond was in financial difficulty and was forced to lay off its employees. It also owed money for supplies and warehouse leasing, with the result that some of the company's suppliers had embargoed it.

Finance had been secured against the value of completed aircraft, but without any means to complete them, the ten airframes then in various stages of construction were worth only their scrap metal value. Apart from the labour issues, Texlond had no access to critical imported components such as engines, propellers, undercarriage, and instruments.

By 2012, the company and its owner were facing legal action over these debts and for fraud. The Uruguayan government considered intervening to complete some of the unfinished aircraft, but the legal situation made this impossible.

== Specifications ==
Data from Lambert & Munson 1992, pp.47-48

General characteristics

- Crew: 1 pilot
- Capacity: 1,060 litres (280.0 US gal; 233.2 imp gal) of chemicals
- Length: 8.09 m (26 ft 7 in)
- Wingspan: 12.63 m (41 ft 5 in)
- Height: 2.49 m (8 ft 2 in)
- Wing area: 19.48 m^{2} (209.7 sq ft)
- Empty weight: 989 kg (2,180 lb)
- Max takeoff weight: 1,905 kg (4,200 lb)
- Powerplant: 1 × Continental IO-520-D six-cylinder, horizontally-opposed, air-cooled piston engine, 220 kW (300 hp)

Performance

- Maximum speed: 194 km/h (121 mph, 105 kn)
- Cruise speed: 188 km/h (117 mph, 102 kn)
- Range: 466 km (290 mi, 252 nmi)
- Service ceiling: 2,470 m (8,100 ft)
- Rate of climb: 2.48 m/s (488 ft/min) max. at sea level

== Notes ==
=== Bibliography ===
- Diagnóstico Participativo del Sector Industrial Aeronáutico en el Uruguay [Participatory Diagnosis of the Aeronautical Industrial Sector in Uruguay] (PDF) (Report). Uruguay: Direccion Nacional de Artesanías, Pequeñas y Medianas Empresas (DINAPYME) and Direccion Nacional de Industrias (DNI). 2012.
- Lambert, Mark; Munson, Kenneth; Taylor, Michael J.H., eds. (1992). Jane's All the World's Aircraft 1992-93 (83rd ed.). Coulson, Surrey, UK: Jane's Information Group.
- Lavender, Bill (June 1993). "Aviones de Colombia Introduces All New Pijao Ag Plane". AgAir Update. Perry, Georgia. pp. 14–20.
- Lavender, Bill (19 April 2007). "Pijao vuelve a América del Sur" [Pijao returns to South America]. AgAir Update. Perry, Georgia. Archived from the original on 21 November 2008.
- "Presentaron un nuevo avión fumigador" [Presenting a new crop-dusting plane]. La Voz del Pueblo. Tres Arroyos, Argentina. March 2006. Archived from the original on 4 July 2007.
- Taylor, Michael J. H. (1993). Jane's Encyclopedia of Aviation. London: Studio Editions.
