= A Touch of the Other =

1970 British film by Arnold L. Miller

- U.S. theatrical release poster
- Directed by: Arnold L. Miller
- Written by: Frank Wyman
- Produced by: Leslie Berens; Arnold L. Miller
- Starring: Kenneth Cope; Shirley Anne Field; Hélène Françoise
- Music by: John Hawkins
- Release date: 1970
- Running time: 92 minutes
- Country: United Kingdom
- Language: English

A Touch of the Other (also known as House of Hookers) is a 1970 British drama film directed by Arnold L. Miller and starring Hélène Françoise, Kenneth Cope and Shirley Anne Field. It was written by Frank Wyman. London private detective finds himself the target of a gangster.

== Plot ==
Delger sets up a private investigation service as "the man who gets things done", and finds himself involved in London's vice world, in between sleeping with his two neighbours, prostitutes Elaine and Wendy, the latter a masseuse who "can't give a man a massage without turning him on".

== Cast ==
- Hélène Françoise as Wendy
- Kenneth Cope as Delger
- Shirley Anne Field as Elaine
- Timothy Craven as Webber
- Vasco Koulolia as Hughes
- Noel Davis as Max Ronieau
- Renny Lister as Sheila
- Sarah Kemp as Shirley (credited as Gypsie Kemp)
- Paul Stassino as Connelly
- Jon Laurimore as Det. Sgt. Masterson
- Peter Bland as Sgt. Phillips
- Vanda Godsell as Angela
- Martin Wyldeck as Traylor

== Critical reception ==
Monthly Film Bulletin said "Ropey old private eye yarn, totally lacking in the inspiration it plainly seeks from Bogart, whose photograph adorns Delger's office wall. The nonsensical plot, based on a surface knowledge of the workings of Soho, is left open-ended, the colour processing is erratic, and the mood is constantly deadened by an excessively noisy score. In the early scenes, it seems possible that Kenneth Cope's droll patter might just save the day, but this hope has dissolved by the time a dream sequence has sent the entire cast prancing through the woods in slow motion."

Kine Weekly wrote: "The motives of the hero and his various involvements are never very clear but it is all put over with quite a bit of cheeky humour, so the tangle does not matter very much. ... The story is as inconsequential as the characters. Kenneth Cope is suitably laconic as Delger, who has a Humphrey Bogart poster on his office wall; Shirley-Ann Field is cool as Elaine."
