= Sarah Kemp (actress) =

Australian actress

- Sarah Kemp as dizzy socialite Charlie Bartlett in Sons and Daughters
- Born: Gypsie Mary Kemp; 24 February 1937; Merbein, Victoria, Australia
- Died: 9 January 2015 (aged 77); Bellingen, New South Wales, Australia
- Other name: Gypsy Kemp
- Occupation: Actress
- Years active: 1969–2008
- Known for: Sons and Daughters (TV series) as Charlie Bartlett (544 episodes)

Sarah Kemp (born Gypsie Mary Kemp, 24 February 1937 – 9 January 2015) was an Australian-born actress, who started her acting career in the United Kingdom, she was best known for starring in the Australian soap opera Sons and Daughters, playing the character of Charlie Bartlett, from 1982 to 1987.

== Career ==
Kemp, who was born as Gypsie Mary Kemp on 24 February 1937 in Melbourne, Victoria and started her career in the United Kingdom, with credits including the film A Touch of the Other (1970), two episodes of the Doctor Who story Day of the Daleks (1972), and a 1972 episode of The Benny Hill Show. She was in the series Shoestring, which appeared on BBC television between 1979 and 1980, playing an Australian hitchhiker.

She then returned to her native Australia and starred in Sons and Daughters. She appeared in A Sporting Chance in 1981. Her last credited role was in the TV movie Mercy Mission: The Rescue of Flight 771 in 1993. She retired from acting and worked as an English teacher.

In 1998 Kemp entered politics running for the seat of Bennelong in the 1998 Australian federal election on the Unity Party ticket and then later ran New South Wales Legislative Council in 1999 also on the Unity ticket.

In the Sons and Daughters DVD of cast interview's in 2007, hosted by co-star Tom Richards, Kemp revealed that she owned and worked in an Art Gallery.

== Death ==
Kemp died at Bellingen Hospital in New South Wales on 9 January 2015, due to lung cancer, aged 77.

== Filmography ==
=== Film ===
Year	Title	Role	Type
1970	A Touch of the Other	Shirley (as Gypsie Kemp)	Feature film, UK
1979	Yesterday's Hero	Redhead in Disco (as Gypsie Kemp)	Feature film, UK
2008	The Gift	Elizabeth	Short film

=== Television ===
Year	Title	Role	Type
1969	Z Cars	Guest role: Nurse	TV series UK, 1 episode
1972	Doctor Who	Guest role: U.N.I.T. Radio Operator (as Gypsie Kemp)	TV series UK, 2 episodes
1972	The Benny Hill Show	Herself (as Gypsie Kemp)	TV series UK, 1 episode
1973	The Tarbuck Follies	Herself (as Gypsie Kemp)	TV movie, UK
1977	Happy Ever After	Guest role: Telephonist (as Gypsie Kemp)	TV series UK, 1 episode
1979	Shoestring	Guest role: Hitch Hiker (as Gypsie Kemp)	TV series UK, 1 episode
1981	A Sporting Chance	Guest role: Kerry	ABC TV series, 1 episode
1982	The Young Doctors	Guest role: Maureen Cawley	TV series, 1 episode
1982–1987	Sons and Daughters	Recurring/Regular role: Charlie Bartlett	TV series, 550 episodes
1988	A Country Practice	Guest role	TV series, 1 episode
1993	Mercy Mission: The Rescue of Flight 771	Hilary Vette	TV movie, Australia/US
1994; 1995	G.P.	Guest role: Sister	ABC TV series, 1 episode
1995	G.P.	Guest role: Kerry	ABC TV series, 1 episode
2011	Today Tonight	Herself with 'Sons and Daughters' cast: Rowena Wallace, Tom Richards, Stephen Comey, Ally Fowler, Alyce Platt, Cornelia Frances & Antonia Murphy	TV series, 1 episode

== See also ==
- 2015 in Australian television
