= Space I'm In =

1991 studio album by The Candyskins

Studio album by the Candyskins
- Released: 1991
- Genre: Psychedelic pop
- Length: 46:17
- Label: Geffen
- Producer: Pat Collier

The Candyskins chronology
Space I'm In (1991)	Fun? (1993)

Singles from Space I'm In
- 1. "Submarine Song" Released: 1991

Space I'm In is the debut album from the British rock band the Candyskins. It contains their hit single "Submarine Song" and the title track was an MTV favourite. A video was also made for their cover of the Buffalo Springfield song "For What It's Worth", directed by Samuel Bayer, whose video for "Smells Like Teen Spirit" by Nirvana had recently entered heavy rotation on MTV. The recording of the album was financed by Geffen Records, although the first single release was under the Long Beach label. The band were signed to Geffen by A&R man Tom Zutaut.

== Background ==
The Candyskins formed in Oxford in 1989, with a line-up of vocalist Nick Cope, his brother and guitarist Mark Cope, guitarist Nick Burton, bassist Karl Shale and drummer John Holiday. They released "Submarine Song" in the local label Long Beach, following it up with "She Blew Me Away" and the You Are Here EP in 1991. After this, they signed to major label Geffen Records.

== Reception ==
Professional ratings
Review scores
Source	Rating
AllMusic	4/5 stars
Alternative Rock	8/10
The Great Indie Discography	6/10 stars

Dave Thompson wrote in his book Alternative Rock (2000) that the band "actually come up with something new" calling the music "sparkling pop rock tinged with psychedelia round the edges" with "unusually thoughtful lyrics". Steven McDonald of AllMusic calls the album "a nice solid production" that is "melodic, well-done and highly enjoyable". John Borack, for Trouser Press, refers to the album as "consistently pleasant if far from earthshaking pop’n’roll", lamenting it "lacks warmth and conviction".

== Track list ==
All tracks are written by the Candyskins, except where noted.

No.	Title	Writer(s)	Length
1.	"So Easy"		4:23
2.	"Submarine Song"		3:59
3.	"Black & Blue"		3:05
4.	"Never Will Forget You"		3:40
5.	"Freedom Bus"		3:34
6.	"Without Love"		3:32
7.	"She Blew Me Away"		3:42
8.	"Third World Blues"		3:34
9.	"Not Sad to See You Go"		4:22
10.	"Get Together"		3:46
11.	"For What It's Worth"	Stephen Stills	3:57
12.	"Space I'm In"		4:43
Total length:			46:17

== Personnel ==
Candyskin

- Nick Cope – lead vocals, acoustic guitar
- Nick Burton – lead guitar, backing vocals
- Mark Cope – rhythm guitar, backing vocals
- John Halliday - drums, percussion

Additional musicians

- Richard "Mini" Brown – bass guitar, banjo
- Bob Prowse — percussion on "For What It's Worth" and "Not Sad To See You Go"
- Pat Collier - producer

== Charts ==
Billboard singles charts

Year	Single	Chart	Peak
1991	"Submarine Song"	Modern Rock Tracks	9
