= Nick Cope =

English musician

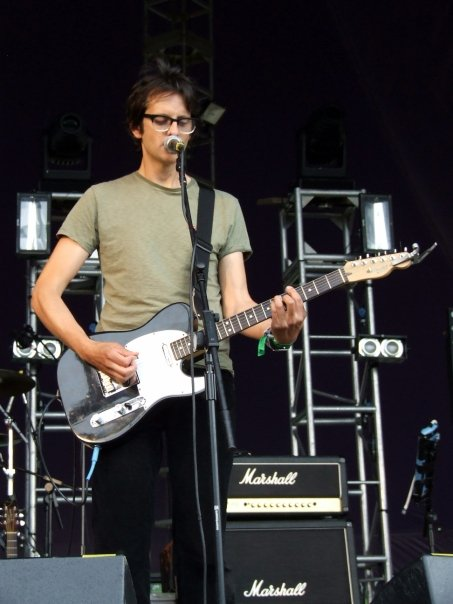
- Cope performing with the Candyskins at Truck Festival 2009

Background information
- Origin: Oxfordshire
- Instrument(s): Guitar, vocals
- Formerly of: The Candyskins
- Website: www.nickcope.co.uk

Nick Cope (born 8 December) is an English musician running regular music sessions in Oxfordshire for young children and their families. Cope also performs at schools and theatres and music festivals in the UK and overseas. He presents a programme on CBeebies called Nick Cope's Popcast.

Cope was previously the lead singer in the rock band the Candyskins.

== Discography ==
- What Colour Is Your T-Shirt (2009)
- My Socks (2011)
- Why Is the Sky Blue? (2012)
- The Pirate's Breakfast (2014)
- A Round of Applause for the Dinosaurs (2016)
- Have You Heard About Hugh? (2018)

== Television ==
Since April 2020, Cope has starred in a CBeebies programme called Nick Cope's Popcast.

== Personal life ==
Cope's parents, Kenneth Cope and Renny Lister, were both actors and his sister is actress Martha Cope. He lives in Oxford with his partner Amanda, with whom he has three children.
