= Fun? =

1993 studio album by The Candyskins

Studio album by The Candyskins
- Released: 16 February 1993
- Length: 42:26
- Label: Geffen
- Producer: Pat Collier

The Candyskins chronology
Space I'm In (1991)	Fun? (1993)	Sunday Morning Fever (1997)

Fun? is the second album from the British rock band the Candyskins. It contains their hit single "Wembley". It is the band's last release on a major label, being dropped by Geffen Records following two years of inactivity after its release. After the band had minor success with later singles, Geffen reissued Fun? in 1996. Nick and Mark Cope, the band's lead singer and rhythm guitarist, were arrested for spray painting 'No Fun' on the wall of the Geffen offices in London after learning about this.

== Reception ==
Professional ratings
Review scores
Source	Rating
AllMusic	2/5 stars
Alternative Rock	7/10
The Great Indie Discography	4/10

Dave Thompson wrote in his book Alternative Rock (2000) that the band with this release "emphasize the rock'n'pop with bigger sound, riddled with soaring leads, rougher riffs, [and] some genuinely meaty power chords". Tom Demalon of AllMusic says the "lyrics, mainly dealing with failed relationships, contrast the sweetness and lightweight feel of the music" and that the tracks highlight "the band's musical diversity". John M. Borack writes in Shake Some Action that album is "[h]ugely entertaining and vastly underrated".

== Music videos ==
The video for "Wembley" shows the plight of a hitchhiker wearing nothing but platform shoes and briefs.

== Track listing ==
All tracks are written by Nick Burton and Nick Cope, except where noted.

No.	Title	Writer(s)	Length
1.	"Wembley"		2:38
2.	"Fun"		3:57
3.	"House at the Top of the Hill"		3:18
4.	"Tired of Being Happy"		3:18
5.	"Land of Love"		3:12
6.	"Everybody Loves You"		4:43
7.	"Everything Just Falls Apart on Me"		3:44
8.	"You Are Here"		4:08
9.	"Grass"		3:59
10.	"Dig It Deep"		3:14
11.	"Let's Take over the World"		3:36
12.	"All Over Now"	Nick Burton, Nick Cope and Mark Cope	2:30
Total length:			42:26

== Personnel ==
- Nick Cope – lead vocals, acoustic guitar
- Mark Cope – rhythm guitar, backing vocals
- Nick Burton – lead guitar, backing vocals
- Karl Shale – bass
- John Halliday — drums

Additional musicians

- Nick Muir — keyboards (tracks 2, 6, 7, 9, 12)

== Charts ==
Billboard singles charts

Year	Single	Chart	Peak
1993	"Wembley"	Modern Rock Tracks	12
