= Martha Cope =

British actress (born 1970)

Martha Cope (born 1970) is a British actress, known for her various roles in the BBC soap opera Doctors. She has appeared in Holby City, Men Behaving Badly, Peak Practice and Family Affairs between 2002 and 2003 when she played the role of Anna Gregory. In 2021, she joined the BBC soap opera EastEnders as Sandy Gibson.

== Life and career ==
Cope was born to parents Renny Lister and Kenneth Cope, both of whom were actors. Throughout her career, she has made appearances in television series including Doctors, Men Behaving Badly, Peak Practice, Holby City, Family Affairs. She also played the Controller in the Doctor Who episode "Bad Wolf" (2005).

In 2021, she was cast in the role of Sandy Gibson in the BBC soap opera EastEnders. Two years later, she joined Emmerdale for a guest stint as Sophie, a relative of Gail Loman.

== Filmography ==
Year	Title	Role	Notes
1994, 1996, 1997, 2000, 2004, 2006, 2008	The Bill	Ellie Foster; Nicola Stephens; Gina Priest; Tracey Grove; Josie Reardon; Deborah Carey; Hilary Fuller	7 episodes
1994, 2006, 2015	Casualty	Sylvia; Christine Denton; Susan Robinson	3 episodes
1995	Out of the Blue	Marilyn Jowett	1 episode
2000, 2007, 2015, 2018, 2023	Doctors	Elaine Pendle; Beth Telford; Sally Bennett; Sam Garwell; Lynda Hamilton	Guest roles
2002–2003	Family Affairs	Anna Gregory	Regular role
2005	Doctor Who	Controller	1 episode
2009, 2011, 2021	Holby City	Misty Fisher; Beverly Newton; Janice Dunlop	4 episodes
2013–2014	Emmerdale	DC Morden	10 episodes
2014–2015	EastEnders	Melissa Phillips	2 episodes
2015–2016	Coronation Street	Joanne	6 episodes
2021	EastEnders	Sandy Gibson	11 episodes
2023	Emmerdale	Sophie	Guest role
