= Sunday Morning Fever =

1997 studio album by The Candyskins

Studio album by The Candyskins
- Released: 3 March 1997
- Genre: Britpop
- Length: 50:34
- Label: Ultimate
- Producers: Dick Edwards, Paul Corkett, Richard Haines

The Candyskins chronology
Fun? (1993)	Sunday Morning Fever (1997)	Death of a Minor TV Celebrity (1998)

Sunday Morning Fever is the third album from the British rock band The Candyskins. It is the band's first release after being dropped by Geffen Records and signing with the indie label, Ultimate, and is their last album with original bassist Karl Shale. The album boasts three singles that all cracked the UK Singles Chart: "Mrs. Hoover", "Hang Myself on You", and the band's only Top 40 hit "Monday Morning".

== Background ==
The Candyskins released their second studio album Fun? in 1993; they were posed for breakthrough success but were dropped by major label Geffen Records. Legal issues kept the band out of the spotlight for a year after this. In late 1995, their manager, Richard Cotton, got the band a deal with the independent label Rotator. They issued the single "Mrs. Hoover," which reached number 65 on the UK Singles Chart. Another single, "Get On," became an independent hit in June 1996, which led to a UK tour alongside Space. After another hit with "Circles" and a reissued "Mrs. Hoover," Geffen Records opted to re-release Fun? in 1996. This irritated the band members; vocalist Nick Cope and his brother, guitarist Mark Cope, were later arrested for spray painting "No Fun" in Geffen's offices in London. They were due to support the Seahorses for that band's live debut in November 1996 but pulled out.

== Release ==
Sunday Morning Fever was issued in the UK and Japan through the label Ultimate. "Hang Myself on You" was released as a single in April 1997, followed by "Feed It" in October 1997. The latter drew huge radio attention after the song's origin, about Heaven's Gate, was explained. The Candyskins toured with the likes of Del Amitri, Dodgy, and My Life Story, which maintained their momentum. Nick Cope said their management wanted them to focus on the US, neglecting the UK in the process.

== Reception ==
Professional ratings
Review scores
Source	Rating
Allmusic	4/5 stars
Alternative Rock	8/10
The Great Indie Discography	5/10 stars
NME	4/10

Stephen Thomas Erlewine of Allmusic writes, "the record is filled with alternately crunching and ringing guitar hooks and pretty melodies" and "has a raw, infectious energy" but "is hampered by undistinguished and uneven songwriting, as well as predictable melodies". Author Dave Thompson, in his book Alternative Rock (2000), wrote that it was "weighed down with a carnival of hits ... sweeping away the most stubborn cob webs."

== Track list ==
No.	Title	Length
1.	"Mrs. Hoover"	3:33
2.	"24 Hours (u.s.e.d)"	2:12
3.	"Car Crash"	3:34
4.	"Monday Morning" (backing vocals: Amelia Heavenly)	4:36
5.	"Get On"	3:22
6.	"Europe & Japan"	3:11
7.	"Hang Myself on You"	3:49
8.	"Disco Hell"	4:07
9.	"Circles"	3:04
10.	"Face the Day"	3:51
11.	"D.R.U.N.K."	3:53
12.	"No No No"	2:24
13.	"Help Me"	5:55
14.	"In My Hair"	3:04
15.	"Bad Hair Day" (Japanese release only)
16.	"Whatever It Takes" (Japanese release only)
Total length:		49:31

== Personnel ==
- Nick Cope – vocals
- Mark Cope – guitar
- Nick Burton – lead guitar
- Karl Shale – bass
- John Halliday - drums
- Rob Lord - keyboards

== Charts ==
UK Singles Chart

Year	Single	Peak
1996	"Mrs. Hoover"	65
1997	"Monday Morning"	34
1997	"Hang Myself on You"	65
