= Mercy Mission: The Rescue of Flight 771 =

- Also known as: Flight from Hell
- Genre: Drama
- Based on: Cessna 188 Pacific rescue
- Written by: George Rubino; Robert Benedetti
- Directed by: Roger Young
- Starring: Robert Loggia; Scott Bakula; Rebecca Rigg; Alan Fletcher
- Music by: Patrick Williams
- Country of origin: United States
- Original language: English

Production
- Executive producer: Robert Benedetti
- Producers: Verna Harvey; Derek Kavanagh; Peter Stelzer
- Cinematography: Donald M. Morgan
- Editor: Benjamin A. Weissman
- Running time: 89 minutes
- Production companies: Anasazi Productions; RHI Entertainment

Original release
- Network: NBC
- Release: December 13, 1993

Mercy Mission: The Rescue of Flight 771 (also known as Flight from Hell) is a 1993 TV movie based on the real-life rescue of the pilot of a Cessna 188. It stars Scott Bakula as Jay Perkins, the pilot of Cessna 30771, and Robert Loggia as Gordon Vette, the Air New Zealand flight 308 pilot who rescues him. Although the film premiered on American television, it was filmed on location in Queensland, Australia.

== Plot ==
Jay Perkins (Bakula) and his fellow pilot Frank (Fletcher) have been hired to fly crop dusters by a local farmer, but they are fired for dangerous aerial stunts. This leaves Jay without income to support his wife Ellen (Rigg) and expected baby. He and Frank are offered a job flying Cessna 188 crop dusters to Sydney via Honolulu, Pago Pago, and Norfolk Island for a handsome fee. Though Jay has reservations about the safety of the assignment, he and Frank ultimately accept. This upsets Ellen, who tells him that the money isn't worth the risk. Nevertheless, Jay and Frank take off the next morning, weighed down by all of the extra fuel necessary for the long flight. Both aircraft have an automatic direction finder (ADF) to help guide them to their destination.

Air New Zealand (ANZ) senior pilot Gordon Vette (Loggia) is looking forward to his impending retirement. At present, however, Gordon is about to serve as the captain of ANZ Flight 308—a brief two-hour trip from Fiji's Nadi International Airport to Auckland Airport in New Zealand.

Jay and Frank make through Honolulu without incident, but Frank crashes into the water upon takeoff from Pago Pago. Frank escapes unharmed, but his plane is destroyed. Jay offers to turn back, but Frank, reminding him of the big payoff, convinces him to keep going. After he has been flying for nearly 14 hours, Jay attempts to contact Norfolk Island by radio but is unsuccessful. He examines his ADF and finds that it is broken. Realizing that he has no idea where he is, Jay radios air traffic control for help.

A search and rescue mission is sent out to find Jay, but their progress is hindered by a storm. Air traffic control tells Flight 308 that they are the only flight in the area that might be able to help. Gordon radios Jay and discovers that he is in danger of running out of fuel. Knowing that Jay is doomed without his help, Gordon convinces his passengers to let him change course and search for Jay.

Back at home, Ellen is distressed to learn that her husband is lost at sea.

Off the coast of New Zealand, Gordon is having difficulty conducting search and rescue operations in a passenger jet. The captain gets creative, attempting to locate Jay by triangulating his position from the range of his radio or by comparing their relative positions of the sun. After attempts fail Jay begins to consider ditching his plane in the ocean while it is still light enough to do so safely, as it will soon run out of fuel anyway. Jay knows, however, that if he lands in the water he will probably not survive. Gordon is finally able to locate him, and Jay returns home to his family.

== Cast ==
- Robert Loggia as Gordon Vette
- Scott Bakula as Jay Parkins
- Rebecca Rigg as Ellen
- Alan Fletcher as Frank
- Mike Bishop as First Officer Russ Mann
- Kit Taylor as Captain Warren Banks
- Gordon Vette and Jay Prochnow in a cameo appearance

== Release ==
=== Domestic ===
The film premiered on December 13, 1993 on the American television channel NBC.

=== Foreign ===
Mercy Mission was mildly successful internationally, as it was released in several countries after its original air date. The film was distributed in Japan by NHK, first airing on July 23, 1994. Its Swedish premiere was on February 16, 1996, and its Hungarian premiere was on July 6, 2005. A DVD version of the film was released in 2016 by EuroVideo in Germany.

== Reception ==
Mercy Mission received mixed reviews. Flixster users gave the film 25% rating. One source of criticism was the film's budget; Sky Cinema called it "yet another plane disaster movie," noting that "the special effects let it down." AirOdyssey.net also found fault with the movie, saying, "the special effects are a little amateurish and may even remind you of the movie Airport." Variety, on the other hand, called Mercy Mission a "well-executed, exciting telefilm, drawing the maximum emotionality from what could have been a generic piece." Variety offered special praise for Loggia and Bakula's acting within the confines of their cockpits, noting that Loggia "performs with much vigor" and Bakula "looks as if he’s actually gone through this trauma [by the end]." Even Sky complimented Loggia and Bakula, albeit cheekily, for their ability to "clench their jaws and narrow their eyes effectively."

== Accuracy ==
Though Mercy Mission is based on the real-life search for a Cessna 188 in 1978, many details of the original event have been changed.

- Jay's position is actually determined by his sighting an oil rig under tow and the two aircraft never see each other. In the movie, one of the passengers aboard the Air New Zealand's aircraft sights Jay's aircraft.
- Jay actually flew alone to Norfolk Island after being located. In the movie, Norfolk Island is socked in by weather, so Jay lands in Auckland, the same destination as the Air New Zealand flight. After the landing, Jay and Gordon meet, Gordon having invited Jay to celebrate Christmas with him at home.
- Some scenes in the movie's second half are absent from official accounts of the incident and have likely been inserted for additional drama.* Jay actually left Pago Pago on December 21, not on Christmas Day. He landed on 23 December (after crossing the International Date Line).
- Instead of continuing directly on to Norfolk Island, Jay lands back on Pago Pago after Frank's crash.
- The Air New Zealand flight number was actually 103, not 308.
- The plane Gordon Vette flew during the actual rescue was a DC-10-30. The plane used in the movie, a Boeing 767-200, was not in use until after he retired.
- Some Australian airlines, such as Ansett Australia and Australian Airlines, are depicted anachronistically.
- Jay's actual last name, Prochnow, was changed to Perkins.
- The first officer's name was actually Arthur Dovey, not Russ Mann.
- The third member of the crew (Gordon Brooks) was actually the flight engineer, not a seasoned relief pilot with navigation experience. He died in the Mount Erebus disaster in Antarctica in November 1979.

== General references ==
"Mercy Mission: The Rescue of Flight 771." Hollywood.com

"Mercy Mission: The Rescue of Flight 771 (1993)." BFI

"Mercy Mission: The Rescue of Flight 771." BBFC

"Mercy Mission: The Rescue of Flight 771 (Movie review)." AirOdyssey.net.

"Review: 'Mercy Mission: The Rescue of Flight 771.'" Variety.

Emergency!: Crisis in the Cockpit, Stanley Stewart, pg 1–25, ISBN 9780830634996.
