= New Zealand Air Line Pilots' Association =

NZALPA
- New Zealand Air Line Pilots' Association
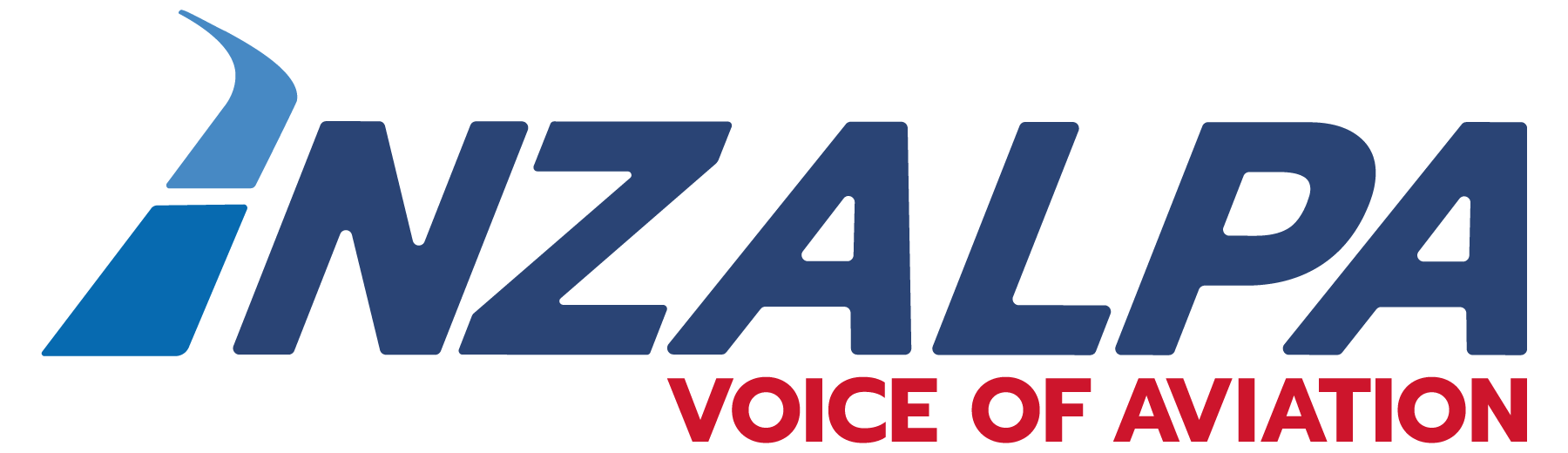
- Founded: 1945
- Headquarters: Auckland, New Zealand
- Location: New Zealand
- Members: 2500
- Key people: Andrew McKeen, president
- Affiliations: IFALPA, IFATCA
- Website: www.nzalpa.org.nz

The New Zealand Air Line Pilots' Association (NZALPA) is a trade union in New Zealand. It represents commercial pilots and air traffic controllers. NZALPA is affiliated with the International Federation of Air Line Pilots' Associations and the International Federation of Air Traffic Controllers' Associations.
