= Cessna 188 =

American light agricultural aircraft

Cessna 188 AG series
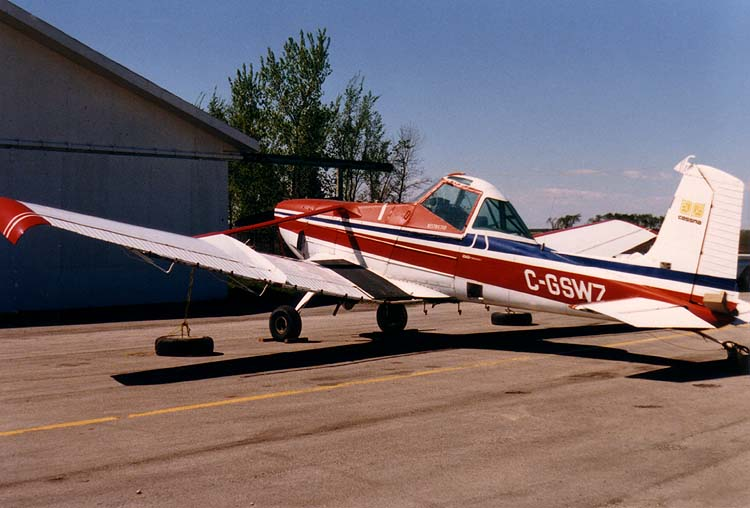
- Cessna A188B-300 AGtruck

General information
- Type: Light agricultural airplane
- Manufacturer: Cessna Aircraft Company
- Number built: 3,976

History
- Manufactured: 1966–1983
- Introduction date: 1966
- First flight: February 19, 1965
- Developed into: Aviones de Colombia AC-05 Pijao

The Cessna 188 is a family of light agricultural aircraft produced between 1966 and 1983 by the Cessna Aircraft Company.

The various versions of the 188 included the AGwagon, AGpickup, AGtruck and AGhusky, along with the AGcarryall variant of the Cessna 185 Skywagon, and constituted Cessna's line of agricultural aircraft.

== Development ==
In the early 1960s, Cessna decided to expand their already wide line of light aircraft by entering the agricultural aircraft market. They surveyed pilots and operators of other brands of agricultural aircraft to see what features and capabilities these operators were looking for. The resulting aircraft was a conventional single-seat, piston-engined, strut-braced low-wing agricultural airplane.

The Cessna 188 borrowed heavily from the Cessna 180, the initial version using the same tail cone and fin structure as well as the same Continental O-470-R 230 hp (170 kW) powerplant. The 188's airframe is predominantly built from 2024-T3 aluminum, with the chemical hopper constructed from fiberglass. The fuselage is of semi-monocoque construction and is lightly pressurized on later models (using the dynamic pressure resulting from the aircraft's forward speed) to reduce induction of chemicals into the airframe.

The Cessna 188 was first flown on 19 February 1965. The aircraft was certified and entered production in February 1966, with 241 aircraft delivered the first year.

The initial design of the Cessna 188 was so successful that over its 17-year production run the basic airframe remained unchanged. Only the engines and the agricultural products dispensing systems were upgraded, other than some minor changes to the ventilation systems.

The main use for the Cessna 188 series was for agricultural purposes, but many examples were later acquired for use as glider and sailplane tugs.

A total of 3976 Cessna 188s of all four variants were built during its production run, made up of 53 AGpickups, 1589 AGwagons, 1949 AGtrucks and 385 AGhuskies.

== Variants ==
188 AGwagon 230
Initial version powered by a Continental O-470-R 230 hp (172 kW) powerplant, a 200 US gallon (760 liter) chemical hopper, with a normal category gross weight of 3,300 lb (1,497 kg) and 3,800 lb (1,724 kg) in the restricted category. Certified on 14 February 1966.

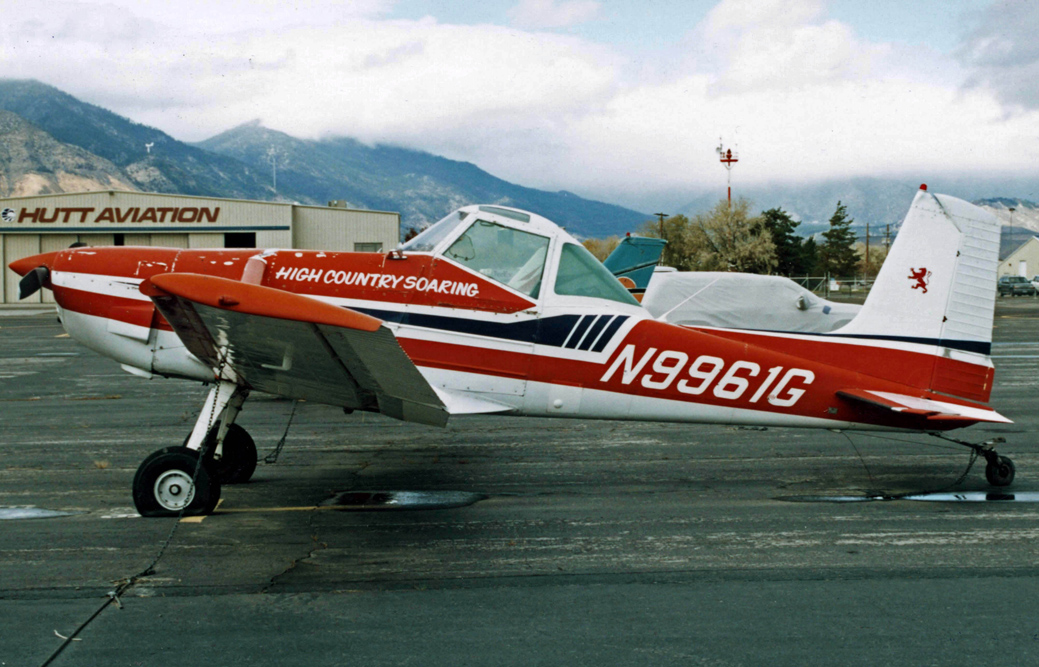
1971-built Cessna A188A AGwagon in use at Minden, Nevada as a sailplane tug

188A AGwagon "A"
Powered by a Continental O-470-R 230 hp (172 kW) powerplant, a 200 US gallon (760 liter) chemical hopper, with a normal category gross weight of 3,300 lb (1,497 kg) and 3,800 lb (1,724 kg) in the restricted category. Certified on 26 September 1969.
188A AGwagon "B"
Powered by a Continental O-470-R 230 hp (172 kW) powerplant, a 200 US gallon (760 liter) chemical hopper, with a normal category gross weight of 3,300 lb (1,497 kg) and 3,800 lb (1,724 kg) in the restricted category. Certified on 26 September 1969.

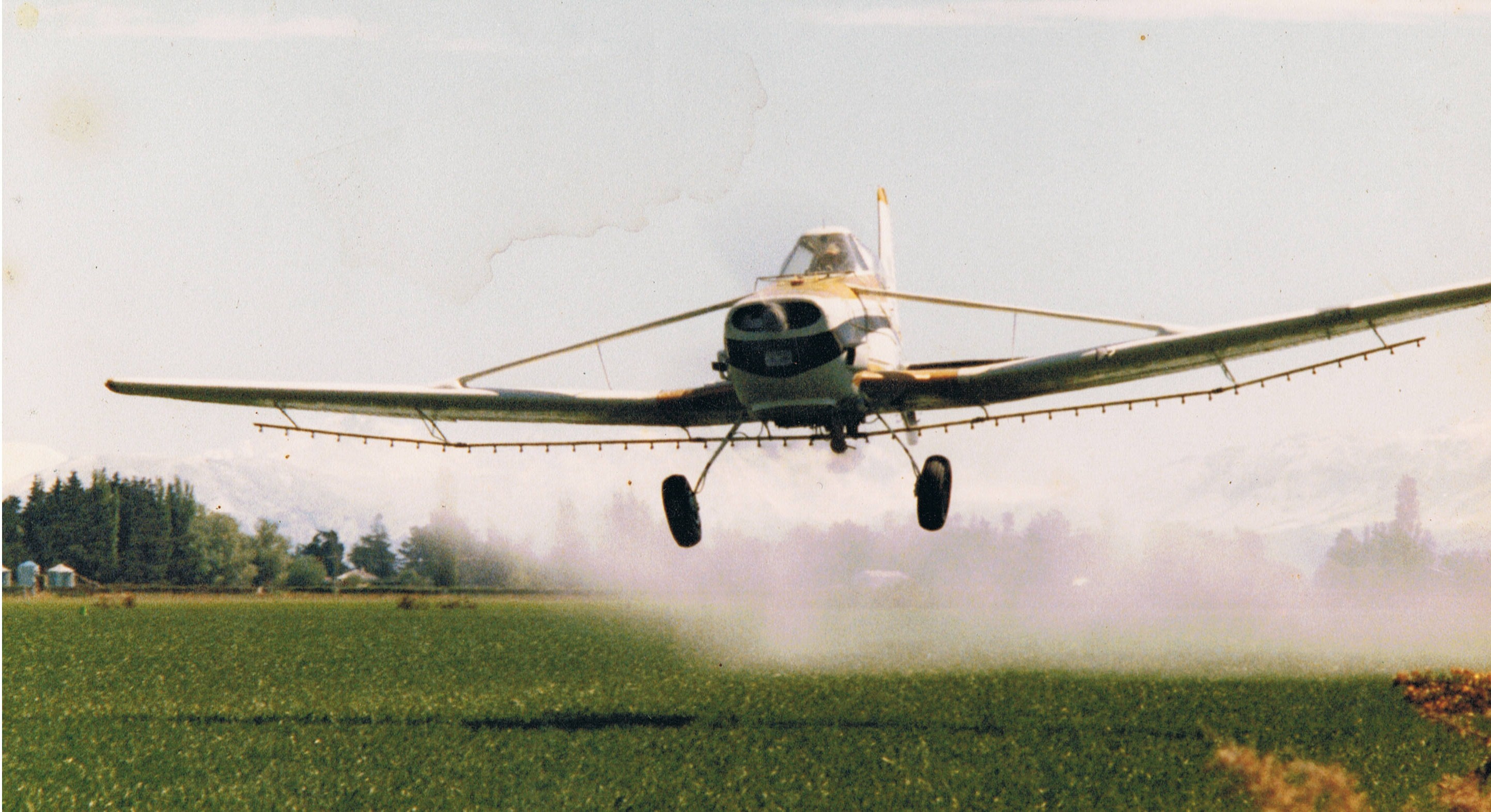
Cessna 188 AGWagon spraying at Canterbury, New Zealand, 1979

188B AGpickup
Powered by a Continental O-470-R or O-470-S 230 hp (172 kW) powerplant, a 200 US gallon (760 liter) chemical hopper, with a normal category gross weight of 3,300 lb (1,497 kg) and 3,800 lb (1,724 kg) in the restricted category. Certified on 20 December 1971, production ended in 1976.
A188 AGwagon 300
Initial version powered by a Continental IO-520-D 300 hp (224 kW) powerplant, a 200 US gallon (760 liter) chemical hopper, with a normal category gross weight of 3,300 lb (1,497 kg) and 4,000 lb (1,814 kg) in the restricted category. Certified on 14 February 1966.
A188A AGwagon "A"
Powered by a Continental IO-520-D 300 hp (224 kW) powerplant, a 200 US gallon (760 liter) chemical hopper, with a normal category gross weight of 3,300 lb (1,497 kg) and 4,000 lb (1,814 kg) in the restricted category. Certified on 26 September 1969.
A188A AGwagon "B"
Powered by a Continental IO-520-D 300 hp (224 kW) powerplant, a 200 US gallon (760 liter) chemical hopper, with a normal category gross weight of 3,300 lb (1,497 kg) and 4,000 lb (1,814 kg) in the restricted category. Certified on 26 September 1969.

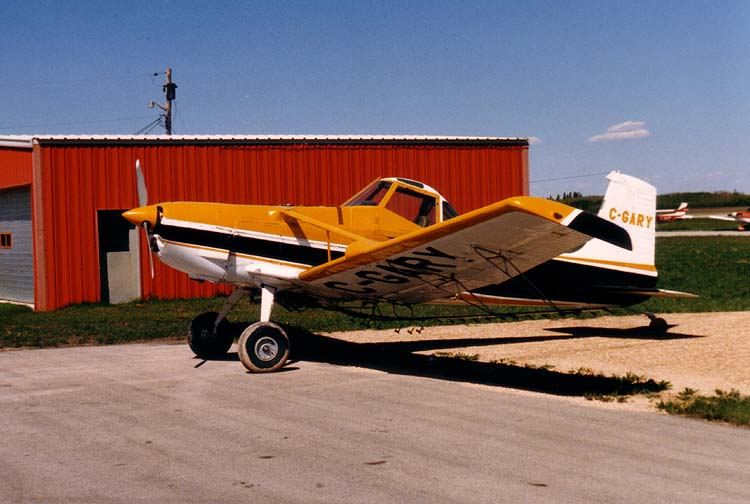
A Cessna A188B-300 AGtruck at Steinbach, Manitoba, May 1988

A188B, AGwagon "C" and AGtruck
Powered by a Continental IO-520-D 300 hp (224 kW) powerplant, a 280 US gallon (1060 liter) hopper, with a normal category gross weight of 3,300 lb (1,497 kg) and 4,000 lb (1,814 kg) in the restricted category. Certified on 20 December 1971, production of the AGwagon ended in 1981 and the AGtruck in 1985.
T188C AGhusky
Powered by a turbocharged Continental TSIO-520-T 310 hp (231 kW) powerplant, a 280 US gallon (1060 liter) hopper, with a normal category gross weight of 3,300 lb (1,497 kg) and 4,400 lb (1,996 kg) in the restricted category. Certified on 8 September 1978, production ended in 1985.

== Aircraft on display ==
- Museum of Transport and Technology, Western Springs, Auckland, New Zealand – Cessna A188 Agwagon ZK-COO
- Aero Space Museum of Calgary, Alberta, Canada – Cessna AgWagon 1966 C-GXQM

== Specifications (1976 AGtruck) ==
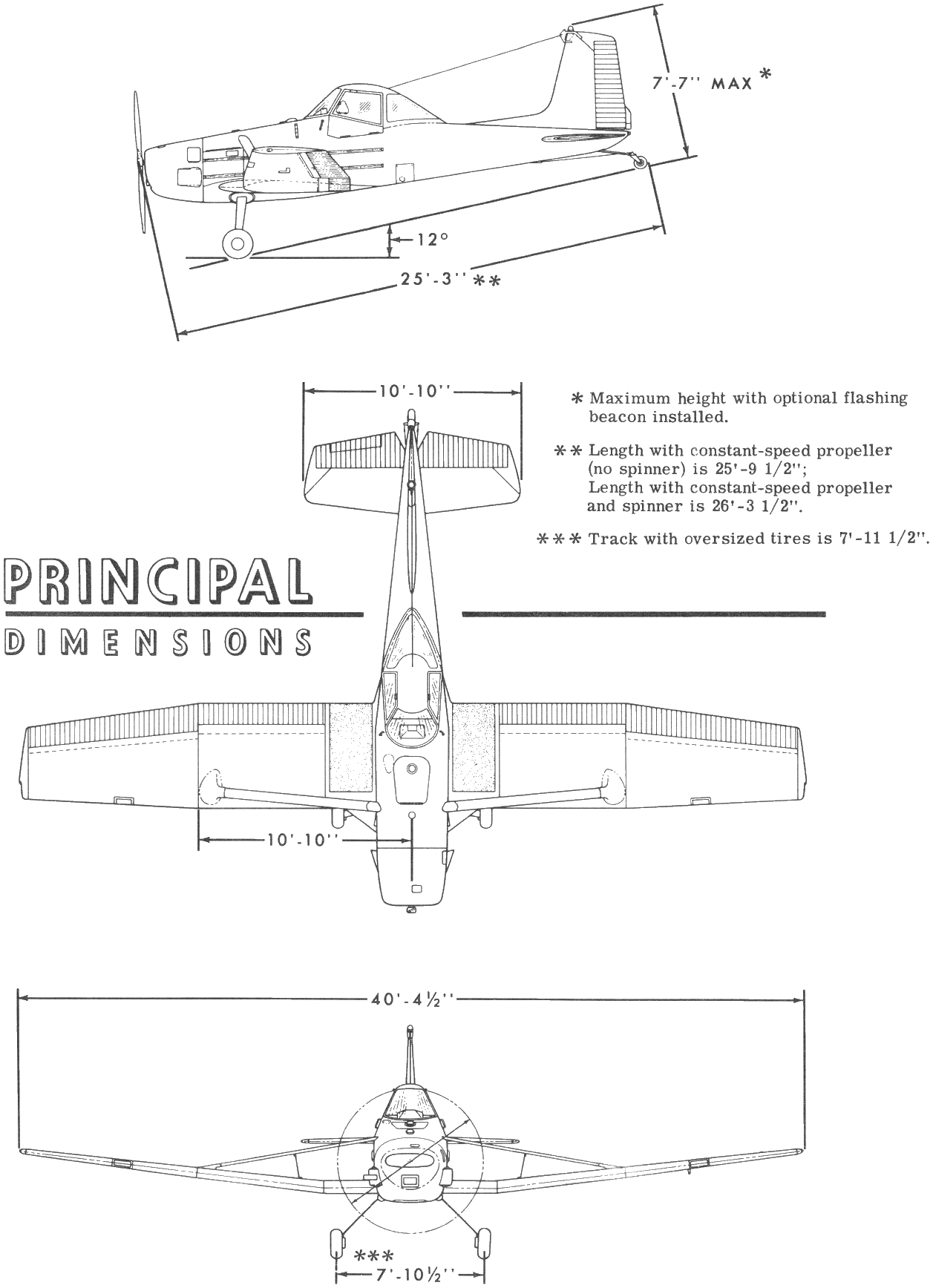
3-view line drawing of the Cessna 188A Agwagon A

Data from Jane's All The World's Aircraft 1976–77

General characteristics

- Crew: 1
- Capacity: Hopper: 280 US gal (230 imp gal; 1,100 L)
- Length: 26 ft 3 in (8.00 m)
- Wingspan: 41 ft 8 in (12.70 m)
- Height: 7 ft 8 1/2 in (2.350 m)
- Wing area: 205 sq ft (19.0 m^{2})
- Airfoil: NACA 2412 modified
- Empty weight: 2,059 lb (934 kg) (with no dispersal equipment installed)
- Equipped weight: 2,214 lb (1,004 kg) (empty, but equipped with liquid dispersal system)
- Gross weight: 3,300 lb (1,497 kg)
- Max takeoff weight: 4,200 lb (1,905 kg)
- Fuel capacity: 56 US gal (47 imp gal; 210 L)
- Powerplant: 1 × Continental IO-520-D air-cooled flat-six, 300 hp (220 kW)
- Propellers: 2-bladed McCauley metal constant-speed propeller

Performance

- Maximum speed: 121 mph (195 km/h, 105 kn)
- Cruise speed: 113 mph (182 km/h, 98 kn) (75% power)
- Stall speed: 57 mph (92 km/h, 50 kn) (with full flaps) (CAS)
- Range: 295 mi (475 km, 256 nmi)
- Service ceiling: 11,100 ft (3,400 m)
- Rate of climb: 690 ft/min (3.5 m/s)
- Takeoff distance to 50 ft (15m): 1,090 ft (330 m)
- Landing distance from 50 ft (15 m): 1,265 ft (386 m)

== See also ==
- Cessna 188 Pacific rescue – an incident involving a Cessna 188 lost over the Pacific Ocean

Aircraft of comparable role, configuration, and era

- Aero Boero 260AG
- Ayres Thrush
- CallAir A-9
- Embraer EMB 202 Ipanema
- Grumman G-164 Ag Cat
- Hongdu N-5
- Piper PA-25 Pawnee
- Piper PA-36 Pawnee Brave
- PZL-106 Kruk
- Zlin Z-37 Čmelák
- Air Tractor AT-802
