= Cessna 188 Pacific rescue =

Aircraft incident in 1978

Incident
- Date: 22 December 1978
- Summary: Navigational disorientation
- Site: Over the Pacific Ocean
- Total fatalities: 0

First aircraft
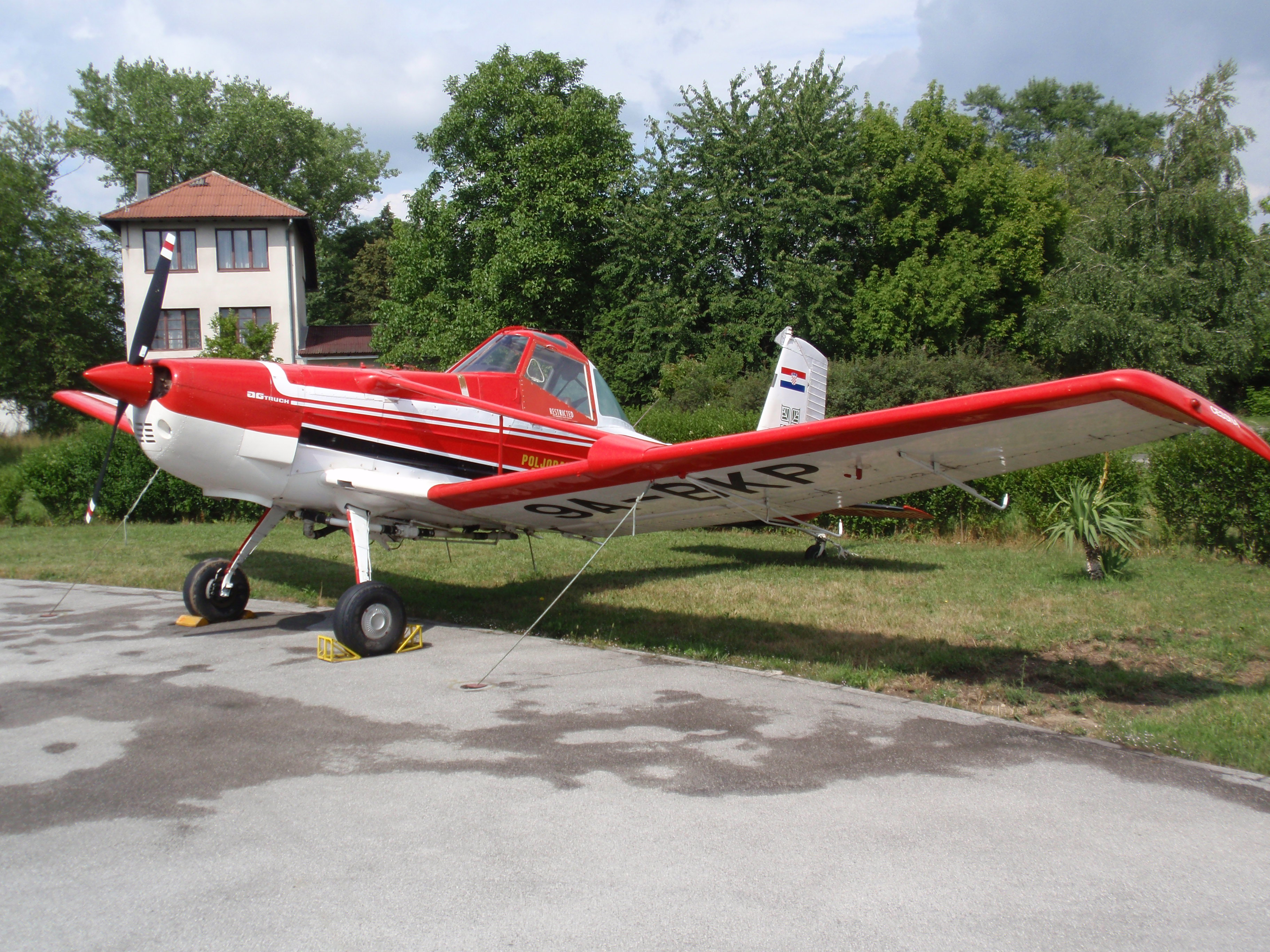
- A Cessna 188 similar to the rescued aircraft
- Type: Cessna 188
- Operator: Jay Prochnow
- Registration: Unknown
- Flight origin: San Francisco International Airport, San Francisco, California, United States
- 1st stopover: Honolulu International Airport, Honolulu, Hawaii, United States
- 2nd stopover: Pago Pago International Airport, Pago Pago, American Samoa
- Last stopover: Norfolk Island Airport, Norfolk Island, Australia
- Destination: Sydney Airport, Sydney, Australia
- Occupants: 1
- Crew: 1
- Fatalities: 0
- Survivors: 1

Second aircraft
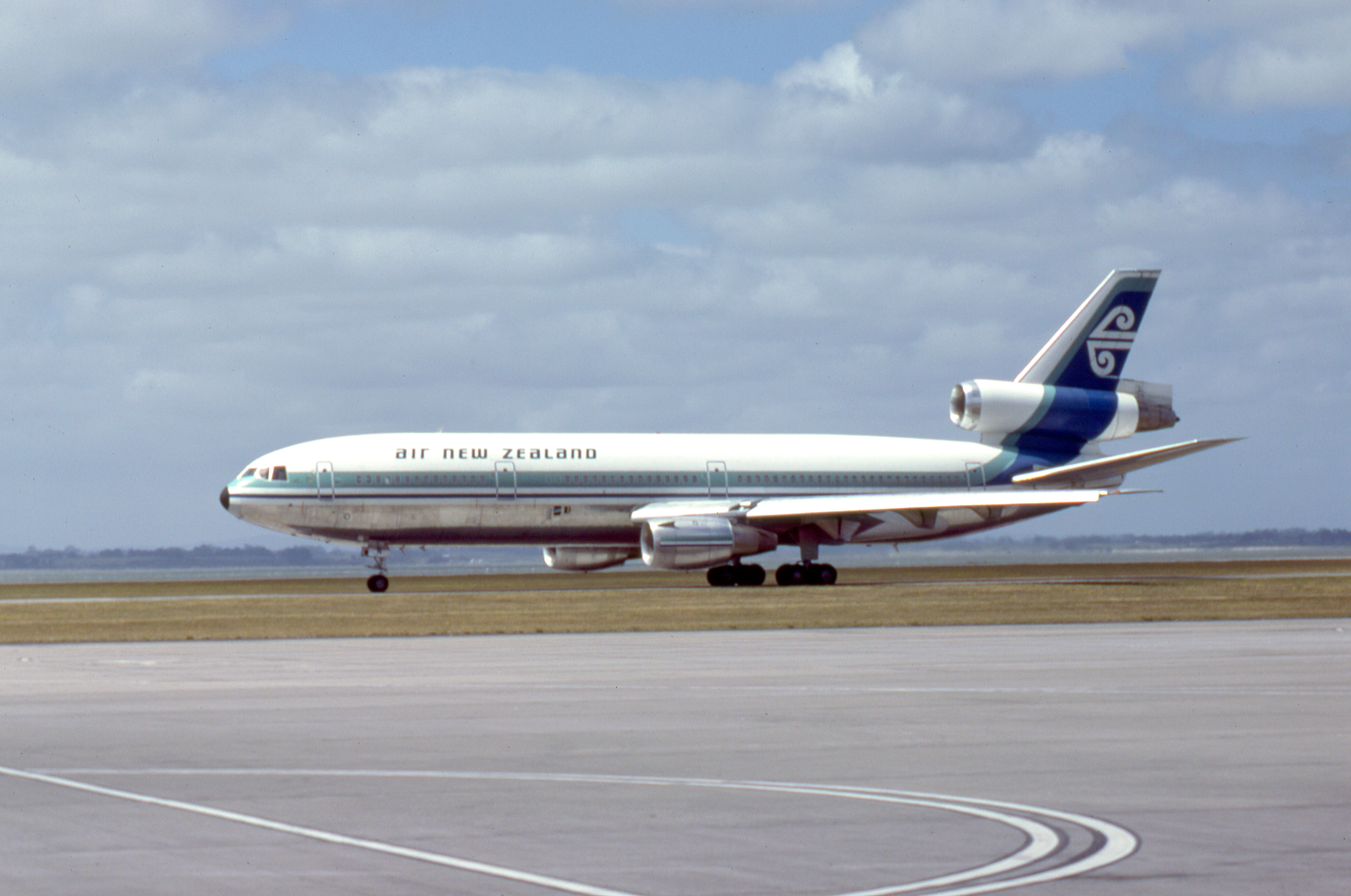
- An Air New Zealand McDonnell Douglas DC-10 in 1978
- Type: McDonnell Douglas DC-10-30
- Operator: Air New Zealand
- Registration: ZK-NZS
- Flight origin: Nadi International Airport, Nadi, Fiji
- Destination: Auckland Airport, Auckland, New Zealand
- Passengers: 88

On 22 December 1978, a Cessna 188 aircraft, flown by an American private pilot, became lost over the Pacific Ocean. The only other aircraft in the area that was able to assist was a commercial Air New Zealand flight. After several hours of searching, the crew of the commercial flight located the lost Cessna and helped it reach Norfolk Island, where the plane landed safely.

== The incident ==
Jay Prochnow, a retired United States Navy pilot, was delivering a Cessna 188 from the United States to Australia. Prochnow had a colleague who was flying another Cessna 188 alongside him. The long trip would be completed in four stages. On the morning of 20 December, both pilots took off from Pago Pago. His colleague crashed on takeoff but was unharmed. Prochnow landed and set out the following day to Norfolk Island.

When Prochnow believed he was approaching Norfolk Island, he was unable to see the island. He informed Air Traffic Control (ATC), but at this point, there was no immediate danger. He continued searching; after locating more homing beacons from other islands, he realised his automatic direction finder had malfunctioned and he was now lost somewhere over the Pacific Ocean. He alerted ATC and declared an emergency.

There was only one aircraft in the vicinity, Air New Zealand Flight 103, a McDonnell Douglas DC-10 travelling from Fiji to Auckland. The flight had 88 passengers on board. The captain was Gordon Vette, the first officer was Arthur Dovey, and the flight engineer was Gordon Brooks. Vette knew that if they did not try to help, Prochnow would almost certainly die. Vette was a navigator, and at the time of the incident, he still held his licence. Furthermore, another passenger, Malcolm Forsyth, was also a navigator; when he heard about the situation he volunteered to help.

As neither Prochnow nor the crew of the DC-10 knew where the Cessna was, the crew had to devise creative ways to find it. By this time, contact between both aircraft had been made on long-range HF radio. Prochnow had crossed the international date line, and the date was now 22 December. Vette was able to use the setting sun to gain an approximate position of the Cessna. He instructed the Cessna to point directly at the setting sun. He did the same and noted the difference in heading between the aircraft as four degrees. After making an allowance for the different altitudes of the aircraft, the difference in sunset times between the aircraft and Norfolk Island was also noted. This data allowed the crew to calculate that the Cessna must be southwest of the DC-10 by about 400 nautical miles (460 mi; 740 km).

About 25 minutes after turning in that direction, contact on short-range VHF radio was established. This had a range of 200 nautical miles (230 mi; 370 km). It was hoped the DC-10 would be making a vapour trail to make it more visible. After contacting Auckland it was determined that weather conditions were not suitable for a trail. Brooks knew that by dumping fuel they could produce a vapour trail. As the search was getting more and more desperate, they decided to try it. Prochnow did not see the trail, and darkness was increasing. Vette wanted all the passengers to be involved, so he asked them to look out of the windows and invited small groups to come to the cockpit.

As the light conditions became darker, Prochnow considered ditching, but Vette encouraged him not to give up. So, they also used a technique known as "aural boxing" to try to pinpoint the small plane; this took over an hour to complete. Once it had been done, they had a much better approximation of Prochnow's position. The DC-10 used its strobe lights to try to make itself more visible to the Cessna. It took some time, but eventually, Prochnow reported seeing light. This was not the DC-10, it was an oil rig, and Prochnow went towards it. This was identified as Penrod, which was being towed from New Zealand to Singapore. This gave Prochnow's exact position. After some confusion about the exact position of the Penrod, it was finally established that the estimates of the crew of the DC-10 were accurate. Prochnow reached Norfolk Island and landed after being in the air for twenty-three hours and five minutes.

== Later events ==
Contemporary newspaper reports noted that Norfolk Island police were "angered" when Prochnow subsequently departed for Sydney without having the Cessna's direction-finding equipment repaired.

McDonnell Douglas awarded the Air New Zealand crew a certificate of commendation for "the highest standards of compassion, judgment and airmanship."

The incident was dramatised in the American 1993 made-for-TV movie Mercy Mission: The Rescue of Flight 771, which starred Scott Bakula as Jay Prochnow (which was changed to Perkins in the movie) and Robert Loggia as Gordon Vette. The plane used in the movie, a Boeing 767-200, was not in service at the time of the incident.

Gordon Brooks was the flight engineer on Air New Zealand Flight 901 and was killed when the DC-10 crashed into Mount Erebus, Antarctica, on 28 November 1979. Gordon Vette published a book about the Flight 901 disaster, called Impact Erebus.

== Sources ==
- Stewart, Stanley (1991). Emergency; Crisis in the Cockpit. TAB Books. pp. 1–25. ISBN 9780830634996.
