= The Candyskins =

English rock band

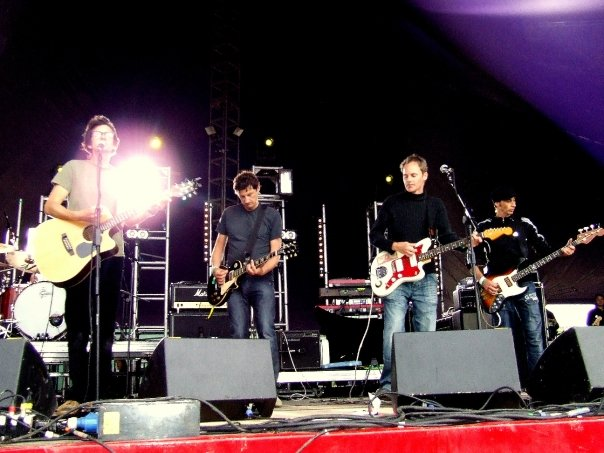
- The Candyskins at Truck Festival in 2009.

Background information
- Origin: Oxford, England
- Genres: Britpop, power pop
- Years active: 1989–1998, 2009
- Labels: Stuff, Geffen, Ultimate
- Past members: Nick Cope; Mark Cope; Nick Burton; Brett Gordon; John Halliday; Karl Shale
- Website: thecandyskins.com

The Candyskins were an English rock band formed in 1989 in Oxford, England. Though early members of the "Oxford Scene", they enjoyed limited commercial success compared to their contemporaries Radiohead and Supergrass. They were considered by the British music press as one of the seminal early bands of the Britpop era. The band recorded four studio albums over a period of eight years before breaking up in 1998 and reuniting in 2009.

== History ==
The band owes its origins to Mark and Nick Cope, Nick Burton and John Halliday all living in the same village, Islip, Oxfordshire, and attending the same local secondary school (Gosford Hill School) between around 1974 and 1980. The four Islip members of the band had begun working together by the time they left school and various line-ups and name-changes followed during the 1980s, until "The Candyskins" were formed in 1989, with Richard (mini) Brown on bass and banjo. After the successful release of the single "Submarine Song" in 1990, the band went into the studio to produce their first full-length album Space I'm In. The album included three singles: "Submarine Song", "She Blew Me Away" and "You Are Here". Brown left the band before the album was released.

After a year of touring and the replacement of a stand-in bass player with Karl Shale, the band released their second album Fun? on Geffen Records in 1993. Characteristically, the band attempted to build upon the US success of Space I'm In with an ironic album featuring songs about football and gardening. The excellent but poor selling record began an elongated legal dispute between the record company and the band, reportedly due to disagreements over songwriting royalties. It did receive extensive airplay in the Iowa City area in 1993.

The album Sunday Morning Fever was released on Ultimate in the UK in 1997, and saw the band enjoy their biggest chart success with the single "Monday Morning" making it into the Top 40 of the UK Singles Chart. The record company went bankrupt and the band were left in limbo during the recording of their last album Death of a Minor TV Celebrity. The album did not do as well as their previous efforts, despite featuring the single "Feed It" which was one of the central songs on the soundtrack to the movie The Waterboy starring Adam Sandler.

== Break-up ==
The band broke up in 1998 and members now primarily pursue other projects in the music industry. Mark Cope has a new band Nine Stone Cowboy, and has released several singles including "Jesus Doesn't Like Me". Nick Cope writes and records music for children and his own CBeebies show Nick Cope’s Popcast. John Halliday has produced many bands in his studio in Oxford, Shonk Studios.

== Reformation ==
The band have reunited on several occasions since their break-up. Performances included:

A farewell gig on New Year's Eve, 2001 at The Zodiac.

The last night party of The Zodiac in Oxford on 17 May 2007. The event was filmed for a documentary about the history of the Oxford music scene, Anyone Can Play Guitar (in which The Candyskins featured).

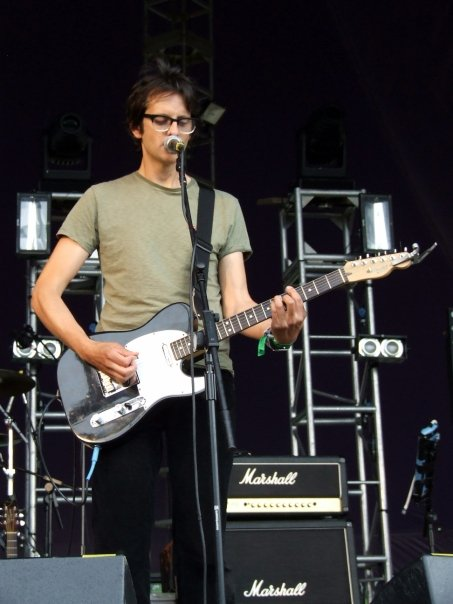
Nick Cope on stage.

They performed at the Truck Festival on 26 July 2009, on a bill that included old Oxford friends Supergrass, amongst others.

== Line-up ==
- Nick Cope – rhythm guitar,lead vocals
- Nick Burton – rhythm guitar
- Mark Cope – lead guitar
- Brett Gordon – bass
- Karl Shale – bass
- John Halliday – drums

== Discography ==
=== Albums ===
Release date	Title	UK chart position
1991	Space I'm In	-
1993	Fun?	-
1997	Sunday Morning Fever	-
1998	Death of a Minor TV Celebrity	-
2000	Live at the Zodiac	-

=== Singles ===
Release date	Title	Chart Positions		Album
Release date	Title	US Modern Rock	UK	Album
1991	"Submarine Song"	9	–	Space I'm In
1993	"Wembley"	12	–	Fun?
1996	"Mrs Hoover"	–	65	Sunday Morning Fever
1997	"Monday Morning"	–	34	Sunday Morning Fever
1997	"Hang Myself on You"	–	65	Sunday Morning Fever
1997	"Feed It"	–	82	Death of a Minor TV Celebrity
1998	"You Better... Stop"	–	78	Death of a Minor TV Celebrity
