= Doctor Who merchandise =

Merchandise regarding the British science fiction franchise "Doctor Who"

The long-running British science fiction television series Doctor Who has since its beginnings in 1963 generated many hundreds of products related to the show, from toys and games to picture cards and postage stamps. This article is not an exhaustive list of merchandise but attempts to present a flavour of the type of material that has been produced. This entry mainly concentrates on "official" spin-offs, that is to say, material sanctioned by the British Broadcasting Corporation, which produces the series.

== Board games ==
- Dodge The Daleks (Christmas 1964)

Featuring William Hartnell as The Doctor. Gameplay involves players attempting to avoid the Daleks while travelling around the gameboard. Players who encounter a Dalek are eliminated. This was the very first Doctor Who board game produced.

- The Dalek Oracle (Christmas 1965)

Featuring William Hartnell as The Doctor. Gameplay involves players answering a series of questions while a plastic Dalek model reveals the answers magically. This game now fetches up to £350 on the second hand market.

- The Dalek Shooting Game (Christmas 1965)

Featuring William Hartnell as The Doctor. Gameplay involves players using a small plastic gun, loaded with plastic pellets, to shoot Daleks and be the first to arrive home safely on the gameboard. This game is also rare on the second hand market.

- Daleks: The Great Escape (Christmas 1966)

Featuring William Hartnell as The Doctor. Gameplay involves players using a pinball-type machine to move a tiny Dalek model around a set course, avoiding obstacles along the way. According to Howe's Transcendental Toybox, this game was terrifically hard.

- Doctor Who (May 1975)

Featuring Tom Baker as The Doctor. Gameplay involves players moving around the universe, using the TARDIS to skip time streams and move from planet to planet. The game was produced by Denys Fisher, who also made a range of Doctor Who toys.

- The Planet of Monsters (October 1975)

Featuring Tom Baker as The Doctor. Updated version of the 1975 Doctor Who game, with the addition of a large Tom Baker full-colour sticker on the box, the subtitle The Planet of Monsters and revisions to the gameplay and equipment.

- War of the Daleks (October 1975)

Featuring Tom Baker as The Doctor. Gameplay involves players attempting to fight off a Dalek invasion by collecting cards and building specialist weapons. Extra playing pieces for the game were available to buy separately, depending on how many players were in the game.

- The Game of Time And Space (June 1980)

Featuring Tom Baker as The Doctor. Gameplay involves players collecting pieces of the Key To Time that are scattered around the gameboard. During the game, players may encounter various aliens and villains from the series – but don't worry, as the doctor's companions are on hand to help.

- The Doctor Who Role Playing Game: 1st Edition (December 1985)

Featuring Tom Baker as The Doctor. Gameplay involves players assuming the roles of The Doctor, his companions or agents of the Celestial Intervention Agency, while carrying out tasks and completing missions, some of which were available as separate gamebooks that had to purchased as 'extras'.

- The Doctor Who Role Playing Game: 2nd Edition (October 1986)

Featuring Tom Baker as The Doctor. Updated version of the game, removing all references of the Sixth Doctor due to copyright issues, and with the addition of a range of 25mm white metal miniatures, designed and released by Citadel Miniatures.

- Battle for the Universe (January 1989)

Featuring Sylvester McCoy as The Doctor. Gameplay involves players assuming the roles of The Doctor, Davros, The Master or the Cyber Controller, while moving around the board and challenging other players to battles in Hyperspace.

- Chess Set (Early 1996-Late 1998)

Featuring All Eight Incarnations of The Doctor. Gameplay involves the typical rules of chess, with the addition of Doctor Who playing pieces (priced at £9.99 per piece), and a twist in the rules to incorporate the given characters. Collectors were given the game board free of charge upon a purchase of playing pieces. An expansion set of playing pieces was issued later at the same price.

- Invasion Earth (March 1999)

"Doctor Who: Invasion Earth" was a miniature wargame designed by Daniel Faulconbridge and released by Harlequin Miniatures. The game allowed players to create or re-enact scenarios involving characters from the Doctor Who universe. The rule book came with an initial scenario of UNIT pitted against the Daleks in an invasion of Earth. Additional scenarios were produced, as well as an extensive range of 28 mm pewter miniatures for the game which covered the first eight Doctors, the Peter Cushing movie Doctor and all of the television companions (except for Katarina) in the original series and the 1996 television movie. In addition a wide variety of monsters, foes and guest characters from a number of the original television stories were produced. Harlequin later became Icons Miniatures, and are currently known as Black Tree Design. Scenarios, miniature statistics and information about the game and miniatures can be found on the site listed below (see below).

- The Interactive Electronic Board Game (November 2005)

Featuring Christopher Eccleston as The Doctor. The game involves players representing the Ninth Doctor in an attempt to defeat the daleks. An electronic TARDIS piece provides instructions for the players throughout the game. This is the only game released to feature the Ninth Doctor.

- Test Your Trivia (June 2006)

Featuring David Tennant as The Doctor. The game involves players asking each other questions related to the TV series, including questions based on both series. The game continues until one player answers ten questions correctly, earning themselves a Who-shaped chocolate.

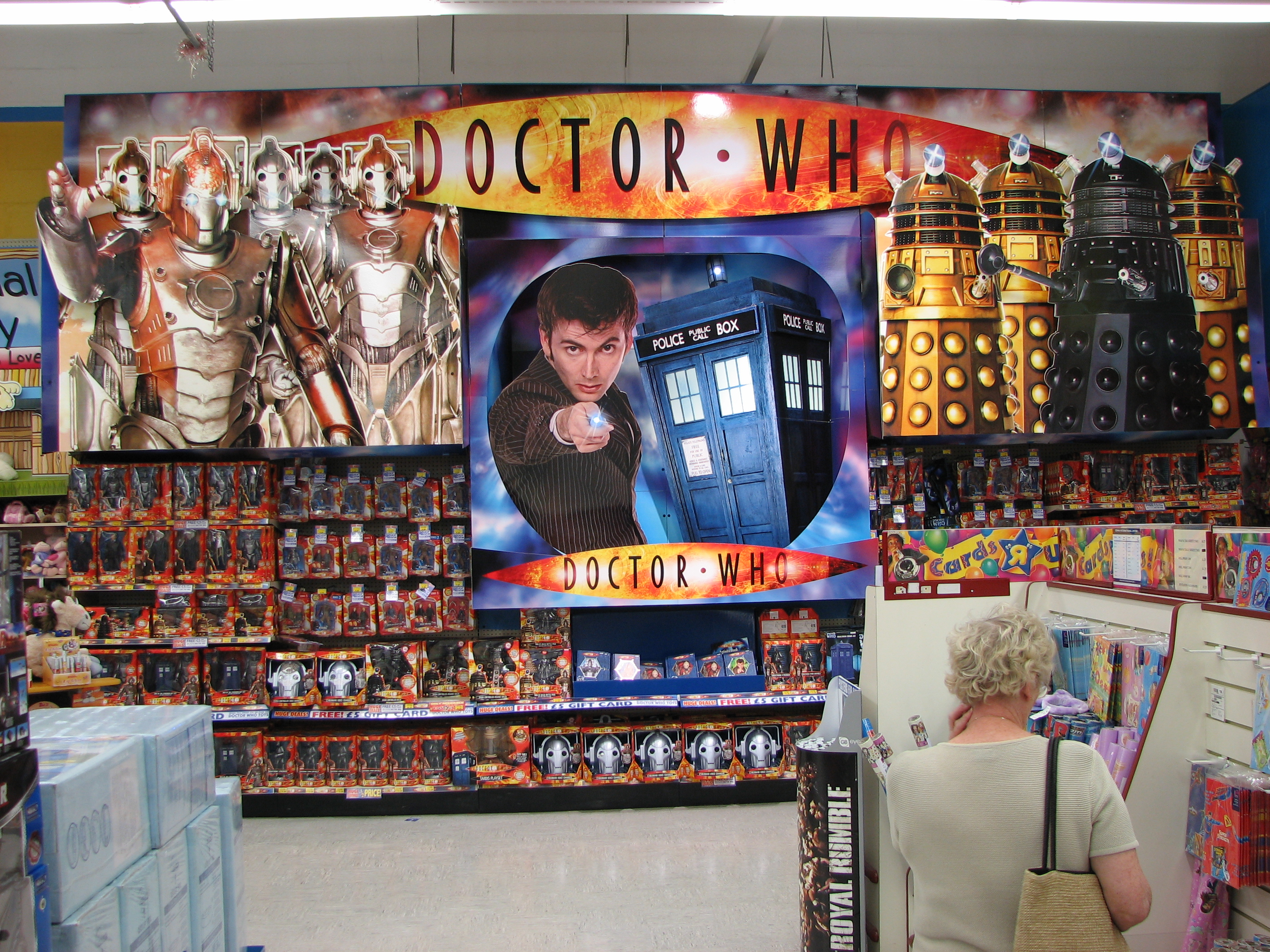
- Merchandise in a Toys R Us store in Chatham, England (2007)
  The Time Travelling Action Game (August 2007)

Featuring David Tennant as The Doctor. The game involves players attempting to capture The Doctor's enemies by collecting tokens from various areas of the board. However, the board can rotate at any time during gameplay, making collecting the tokens much harder.

- Operation (September 2007)

Featuring David Tennant as The Doctor. Doctor Who provides its own personal twist on 'Operation', with players attempting to carry out an operation on Dalek Sec. If any of the players fail during play, one of several famous Dalek phrases, such as "Exterminate!", will be heard.

- Doctor Who & The Dalek (September 2007)

Featuring David Tennant as The Doctor. The game involves players representing one of four Doctor Who characters (The Tenth Doctor, Martha Jones, Captain Jack Harkness or K-9), while completing three laps around the gameboard without being caught by a Dalek.

- The Time Travelling Game (Christmas 2007)

Featuring David Tennant as The Doctor. Exclusive to supermarket chain Marks & Spencer, the game involves players exploring different parts of the Doctor Who universe, while collecting tokens and completing laps. The winner of each round receives a Doctor Who-shaped chocolate prize.

- Three in One (Easter 2008)

Featuring David Tennant as The Doctor. Issued as part of the Doctor Who Easter promotion in 2008, this set includes three different playabale games, including a dalek adaption of Tic Tac Toe, a game involving press-out characters from the series and a cybermen adaption of Solitaire.

- The Dalek Battle Through Time (April 2008)

Featuring David Tennant as The Doctor. The game involves players maneuvering around the gameboard, attempting to evade capture from a motorised Dalek that can detect players' playing pieces in front of it. The winner is the first to reach the end of the gameboard.

- The Facts And Trivia Board Game (April 2008)

Featuring David Tennant as The Doctor. The game involves players answering a series of questions based around the TV series, with the TARDIS revealing the answers. The winner is the first player to reach the end of the gameboard with at least eight correct answers.

- Exterminate Wire Buzz Game (June 2008)

Featuring David Tennant as The Doctor. Exclusive to high street chain Woolworths, the game involves an adapted version of children's classic "Beat The Bleep". Players may be required to change the Dalek cardboard cut-out or movable wire during gameplay, all while keeping their nerve.

- Scene It? (October 2008)

Featuring David Tennant as The Doctor. The game involves players watching clips, bloopers and deleted scenes from the TV series using an interactive DVD, all while attempting to answer questions and keeping ahead of their opponents on the gameboard.

- The Time Wars Game (July 2010)

Featuring Matt Smith as The Doctor. The game involves players completing a mission to capture a selection of The Doctor's worst enemies, all while keeping themselves safe from the mercy of the Time Vortex and flip-action gameboard. This was the first game to feature Matt Smith as The Doctor.

- Battle To Save The Universe (July 2010)

Featuring Matt Smith as The Doctor. The game involves players collecting statuettes of The Doctor's worst enemies, in an attempt to foil their opponent's plans to do the same. This was the first game to feature characters which had not featured with the relevant Doctor (IE Slitheen appeared with Christopher Eccleston, not Matt Smith).

== Card games ==
- The Doctor Who Collectible Card Game (1996)

Published by MMG, this collectible card game involved players building a deck of cards from their collection and playing that deck against each other. The object of the game was to remove the opponent's six Time cards before they removed yours. This would be accomplished by attacking the other player using cards representing the various Doctors, Assistants and monsters that had appeared in the original 26 series of Doctor Who.

- Doctor Who – Battles in Time (2005–2009)

Featuring Christopher Eccleston and David Tennant as The Doctor. This fortnightly magazine and trading card game partwork from GE Fabbri lasted over four years, with five sets of cards being released within that time. The first set, "Exterminator", featured 275 cards including characters from both the first and second series, as well as the 2005 Christmas special. The second set, "Annihilator", included 100 cards featuring characters from the second series and the 2006 Christmas special. The third set, "Invader", included 225 cards featuring characters from the third series. The fourth set, "Ultimate Monsters", included 225 cards and was the first set to venture back into Classic Who, featuring monsters and villains featured with all ten doctors. The fifth and final set, "Devastator", included 250 cards featuring characters from the 2007 Christmas special and the fourth series. In addition to these 1075 cards, a further 31 cards were produced – an exclusive 18 card "Daleks vs. Cybermen" mini-set, issued with issue 18; an exclusive 10 card "Sarah Jane Adventures" mini-set, issued with issue #62; the 'Dalek Blaster' bonus card, issued with the Invader launch issue; the 'Psychic Paper' bonus card, issued with the very first issue; and 'Super Rose', the ultimate "Gold" card, found in only 1 in every 1000 packs of cards.

- Alien Armies (2009)

Featuring David Tennant as The Doctor. This collection, which included characters from all four series, the 2005, 2006, 2007 and 2008 Christmas specials, as well as "Planet of the Dead" and "The Waters of Mars", was released in late 2009 as a replacement for the discontinued Battles in Time range. These cards were considerably less expensive, giving them a wider market for fans. The set also included limited edition cards of all ten doctors.

- Monster Invasion (2010–2014)

Featuring Matt Smith as The Doctor. Now issued by BBC magazines, this card collection is an up-to-date revamp of the Battles in Time series. The test set, released in the South East region in April 2010, featured 90 cards including characters from all five series of the show. The official set, containing 375 cards featuring characters from series five, will be released in April 2011 nationwide.

The collection was test marketed in the South West of the UK ahead of a nationwide release. The test set included seven magazines and a set of 90 trading cards. When the magazine and trading card collection were launched nationwide the card set was increased to 165 cards and a planned run of 52 magazines.

Card collection and gameplay Website info and online code All-time top 10 Alien slamdown (different monster or alien head-to-head) Episode guide Where's the Doctor? (Search & find) A-Z of aliens Puzzles. The first set of cards featured 165 cards (Doctor: 5 Blue, Villain: 11 Purple, Ally: 13 Turquoise, Monsters: 26 Red, Gadgets: 9 Green, Adventure: 24 yellow & the infinite card). The set included common, rare, super rare 3D and ultra rare. Included in the first Monster Invasion tin was also an exclusive exploding TARDIS bonus card. The second set titled Monster Invasion Extreme was launched September 2011 and consisted of 180 cards including three exclusive cards: Doctor autograph card (came with issue 11), Amy autograph card (came with subscriber tins and Rory autograph card with standard tins. The card game ended in 2013, with issue 52 being the last issue of the magazine.

- Alien Attax (2013–2014)
- Doctor Who Fluxx published in 2017 by Looney Labs.

Takes the basic gameplay of Fluxx and merges it with multiple regenerations of the Doctor, various companions, Gallifreyan technology, K-9, Cybermen, Daleks, Weeping Angels, and the Master.

- Doctor Who: Worlds Apart is a virtual card collecting game set to be released in 2021

== Game books ==
These were a series of six gamebooks featuring the Sixth Doctor, released during the 1985–86 hiatus. The books were published by Severn House in the United Kingdom and by Ballantine in the United States; at least three were also published by the ABC in Australia, using the British titles. The stories also feature many familiar old companions and enemies including K-9, Peri, Turlough, the Rani and Omega. With the exception of Michael Holt, all the books in the series were written by scriptwriters for the television series, and at least one book, Mission to Venus, was a reworking of unused scripts, in this case Emms' unmade Second Doctor serial The Imps. Despite this, some of the books broke from the continuity of the series, particularly Crisis in Space which features Vislor Turlough, even though he did not travel with the Sixth Doctor. The six books were:

Title	Author	ISBN UK	ISBN US	TV companions featured
Search for the Doctor	Dave Martin	ISBN 0-7278-2087-7	ISBN 0-345-33224-5	K-9
Crisis in Space	Michael Holt	ISBN 0-7278-2093-1	ISBN 0-345-33225-3	Peri Brown, Vislor Turlough
The Garden of Evil	Dave Martin	ISBN 0-7278-2113-X	n/a	None
Mission to Venus	William Emms	ISBN 0-7278-2122-9	unknown	Peri Brown
Invasion of the Ormazoids	Philip Martin	ISBN 0-7278-2100-8	ISBN 0-345-33231-8	None
Race Against Time	Pip and Jane Baker	ISBN 0-7278-2116-4	ISBN 0-345-33228-8	Peri Brown

FASA also published two books similar in format to the "Make Your Own Adventure" books listed above, the first ('The Vortex Crystal by William H. Keith, Jr.) featuring the Fourth Doctor, Sarah Jane Smith and Harry Sullivan, and the second (The Rebel's Gamble also by William Keith, ISBN 0-931787-68-8), set during the American Civil War featuring the Sixth Doctor, Peri and also Harry Sullivan, even though Sullivan was not a companion during the Sixth Doctor's era, although there is a brief reference to Sullivan having rejoined the Doctor. A further gamebook, entitled Time Lord, was written by Ian Marsh and Peter Darvill-Evans and published by Virgin Books. These were totally unrelated to the previously released Doctor Who RPG by FASA. It has different, simpler, mechanics and is considered faithful to the original television show. However, it was marketed with other Doctor Who books and not other role-playing games. In addition, Virgin was unknown in the gaming market. As a result, it did not sell well and aside from a few articles in Doctor Who Magazine, no supplements were published. Since 1996, it has been made available for free on the Internet by the authors.

== Tabletop Role-Playing Games ==
FASA also published a tabletop role-playing game simply titled The Doctor Who Role Playing Game in a box set in 1985, as well as three supplements and a line of seven adventures.

In December 2009, Cubicle 7 published Doctor Who – Adventures in Time and Space: The Roleplaying Game.

In 2024, Cubicle 7 published a D&D Doctor Who crossover called Doctors and Daleks.

== Computer games ==
- Doctor Who: The First Adventure (1983), The Key To Time (1984), Doctor Who and the Warlord (1985) and Doctor Who and the Mines of Terror (1985)

These games were produced and released for the BBC Micro, Amstrad CPC 464, ZX Spectrum and C64. The games featured the characters of the Fifth And Sixth Doctors, with the games becoming very hard to obtain on the second-hand market. New characters for the games included feline robot called Splinx. A sequel for the series, entitled 'Doctor Who 2', was planned but was later cancelled due to production problems.

- Pinball (1992)

In 1992, Midway (under the Bally label) released a Doctor Who pinball game, designed by Bill Pfutzenreuter (also known as "Pfutz") and Barry Oursler (designer of the 1986 classic Pin*Bot). The theme of the game was "Time Streams", and featured a rearrangement of the Doctor Who theme tune by Jon Hey. Sylvester McCoy provided voice work for the game. The machine features a Dalek on top of the scoreboard. This Dalek was designed to move along with the game; however, the electronics were not always attached.

- Dalek Attack (1992)

A computer game published by Admiral Software, it allowed the player to play either the Second, Fourth or Seventh Doctors, with the option of a second player taking the role of Ace or Brigadier Lethbridge-Stewart. The object of the game was to navigate through several environments, ranging from sewers to devastated cities and defeat the Daleks and their assorted minions.

- Destiny of the Doctors (1997)

Published by BBC Multimedia, this was a CD-ROM based computer game in which the player took the role of the Graak, a creature of mental force created by the Fourth Doctor. The Master has imprisoned all seven of the Doctor's incarnations in a dimension known as the Determinant and the player must undergo a series of quests and puzzles to free each of them. The game featured extensive new clips of Anthony Ainley as the Master (playing the role for the final time) and the voices of all the surviving actors to play the Doctor as well as that of Nicholas Courtney as Brigadier Lethbridge-Stewart.

- Top Trumps (2008)

Featuring David Tennant as The Doctor. This computer adaptation of the popular card game featured the Doctor and companions attempting to defeat a wide range of enemies by competing in card battles against them. This game was released on PlayStation 2, Nintendo DS, PC, and later, the Nintendo Wii.

- The Adventure Games (2010)

Featuring Matt Smith as The Doctor. The first official Doctor Who video game features Matt Smith and Karen Gillan in five interactive episodes with Arthur Darvill only featured in the fifth episode, the first of which released in June 2010. Entitled "City of the Daleks", "Blood of the Cybermen", "TARDIS", "Shadows of the Vashta Nerada" and "The Gunpowder Plot", each game is available to download from the Doctor Who website exclusively for PC and Mac. The series was discontinued after five games, due to budget cuts and to focus more on the Eternity Clock game.

- Evacuation Earth / Return To Earth (2010)

Featuring Matt Smith as The Doctor. These two video games, the first of which is for the Nintendo DS, and the second for the Nintendo Wii, are two parts of the same story. Involving a mass evacuation of Earth, the doctor and Amy discover something terrible is afoot. But can they defeat the world's worst villains to make the Earth inhabitable again? Both games were released in October 2010. They will not be released on any other format, says showrunner Steven Moffat. Return to Earth was released with a sonic screwdriver shaped Wii Remote

- The Mazes of Time (2010)

A third person maze game release for the Apple iPhone and iPad. The Doctor and Amy land on a spaceship that is broadcasting a distress signal and must race through time to defend them from a lone Dalek and other creatures from the Doctor Who universe.

- Worlds in Time (2012-2014)

A massively multiplayer online role-playing game released on 12 March 2012. Players are able to control the player and the TARDIS as they complete challenges set by the Doctor to save the universe from various enemies and is free to play. The game closed on 3 March 2014.

- The Eternity Clock (2012)

A third person adventure game released on PlayStation 3, then later PlayStation Vita and PC. Featuring Matt Smith and Alex Kingston, The Doctor and River Song as they travel across space and time encounting the Cybermen, Daleks, Silurians and The Silence to save Earth by gathering pieces of the eternity clock.

- Doctor Who Legacy (2013)

A puzzle role-playing game initially released as part of the 2013 anniversary celebrations published by Tiny Rebel Games. It was closed down in 2019.

- Doctor Who and the Dalek (2014)

A mobile platform game published by BBC Digital. It was written by Doctor Who writer Phil Ford and centers around the Doctor teaming up with a Dalek to save the universe.

- Doctor Who Game Maker (2015)

A web game for making platform games. Developed by Aardman Animations and published by BBC Digital.

== Action figures and costumes ==
=== Scorpion Automotive ===
Widely considered by collectors to be the 'holy grail' of BBC authorized Dr Who merchandise. The 1964 Scorpion Automotive Dalek costume was a joint venture between the BBC & Scorpion to capitalize on the 'Dalek craze' sweeping the country at the time. Released for sale in the run up to Christmas 1964 in limited numbers, an extensive fire at the Scorpion Automotive factory in Nottingham, England destroyed all remaining stock of the Dalek costumes & also the injection moulding tools required to fulfill any further orders.

Of the several hundred Dalek costumes that made it into the shops in 1964 only a handful survive today with the last known sale of a Scorpion Automotive Dalek costume (at a London Toy auctioneer) seeing a hammer price of £5,000 in 2014.

=== Denys Fisher ===
Denys Fisher/Mego released a selection of 9" figures in the mid-1970s, including the Fourth Doctor, Leela, K-9 (released in 1978 after the first six), the Giant Robot, a Cyberman, a Dalek, and a TARDIS. The Dalek and K-9 have friction drives to allow for movement. The TARDIS has a self-propelled spinning top. The Doctor could be inserted into the TARDIS and the "light" on top was spun. If the red button was hit while the top was spinning, the Doctor "disappeared". If the green button was hit, the Doctor re-appeared. These toys are all extremely rare and difficult to find, especially in near mint or mint condition. The Tom Baker figure is the most common and can be found in an English or Italian box. A mint (or near mint) Baker figure with the box is worth between $150–500, depending on quality of the figure and the box. The Tom Baker figure with the Italian box is more common (and may sell for as little as $75–200). The other figures, excluding the TARDIS, are worth $500–1200 if they are in near mint quality and have their original box, even if the box is damaged. In May 2006, a Denys Fisher Dalek with box sold for over $1150 on eBay. The TARDIS is usually a bit cheaper at $200–350 (provided it has no damage or any repairs are not noticeable and the box is included). Of course, this is relative and eBay auctions can vary considerably. While a mint Leela may sell for $500–600, one without a box may only sell for $150–200. That said, some items are so rare that even a damaged item, or one with missing pieces, is worth a fair amount. For example, in May 2006, a Leela doll without her loin cloth (and correspondingly, without the attached pouches and knife) but with her original, but highly damaged box, sold for over $350. It really depends on competition, timing and if serious bidding is occurring. Nonetheless, considering these toys sold in the UK for under GBP £10 in the 1970s, their value has gone up nearly 10- to 100-fold and will most likely continue to rise due to the popularity of the new Doctor Who series. Some stress cracks due to time and cannot be avoided, but more serious cracks or discolouration will decrease the value considerably. The more damaged the item is, obviously, the less it is worth. These are very simple toys, as none require batteries, have any flashing lights or speak, but they have become quite collectible. The rarity of the boxes (or high quality boxes) has led to people selling box reproductions. These reproduced boxes can be an alternative as they are less expensive than finding a figure with the original box, although true collectors may not appreciate them. Be sure to ask if the box is original or a reproduction. Along those lines, some of these toys can be repaired. The TARDIS "light" and doors easily broke, but repairs by those with ingenuity or toy-repair skills can be done. Simply re-glueing the light or the doors rarely works for this toy, so more advanced repairs are needed. Flaking damage on the Cyberman suit can be repaired using a high quality silver paint for fabric. Dust on many figures can be removed by air-blown sprays or delicate washing. Leela's hair can be repaired by combing, conditioning and steam-cleaning. Delicate repainting can also be done on some figures. The key is to do just enough repairs, without ruining the essence of the original. Any repair work should be noted in ads (often a seller will simply sell the damaged item and leave repairs to the buyer). If unsure, ask the seller. The Denys Fisher K-9 or Dalek may be initially confused with the talking Palitoy K-9 or Dalek toys. The Palitoy talking toys were released around the same time and are also quite collectable. Finding a good quality talking K-9 or Dalek, that speak at a "normal" speed and have their original boxes, can cost anywhere from $200–500. Even without the box, the toy could be worth $100–150 if in good speaking condition. If the toys do not speak, their value drops considerably (not more than $50–100 for a non-speaking Dalek). A working Palitoy K-9 is more rare and may be more costly. Both toys speak via a small vinyl record that is inside or near the battery compartment. The K-9 record is inside the battery compartment and the record can be flipped over, giving K-9 more phrases. The Dalek record is buried within the toy and cannot be removed. The Palitoy K-9 is considerably larger than the Denys Fisher line, so the two cannot be confused when visually compared. The Palitoy Dalek is considerably different from the Denys Fisher Dalek, although it is similar in size. The Palitoy Dalek came in red with black Dalek "spots" or "bumps" and in silver-grey with blue "bumps". The silver/blue Dalek is a bit more rare. Both Palitoy Daleks had black extremities, with a red end on the eye and red suction cup. The Denys Fisher Dalek is also silver/blue, but has a red head and a blue eye piece (with silver gun and suction cup). Palitoy toys also tended to rust and crack.

=== Dapol ===
For the series 25th anniversary in 1988 the BBC commissioned model train manufacturers Dapol to release the first line of Doctor Who action figures since the Denys Fisher toys of 1976. The first wave of the line was composed of current Doctor Sylvester McCoy, already departed companion Melanie Bush (in a pink top), the Doctor's iconic ship the TARDIS, the Fourth Doctor's robotic pet dog K9 and a Tetrap monster from Time and the Rani. The first wave had numerous errors such as the TARDIS console featuring the wrong amount of sides and a green painted K9 as opposed to the correct metallic grey, apparently because the photo given by the BBC to Dapol gave the impression K9 was green as it allegedly reflected the grass. Half a year later a second wave of the first series was released featuring an Earthshock Cyberman, Dalek variants and the Fourth Doctor, surprisingly without his trademark long scarf and hat. The next batch of figures released in 1989 featured costume variants for the Doctor and Melanie, current companion Ace, an Ice Warrior story and a two-armed Davros. At first the way to readdress this mistake was simply to snap the offending hand off but later models took more care to readdress the balance. The final editions of this wave were three more Dalek colour variants. In 1990 the Dapol factory suffered serious fire damage and no new Doctor Who figures were produced until 1998. Dapol's third series of action figures mainly focused on the early 1970s era of the programme, including two types of Silurian, a Sea Devil, the Master as portrayed by Roger Delgado and the Doctor as portrayed by Jon Pertwee. The series also featured a Dalek based on the Peter Cushing film series and a gold Dalek from Day of the Daleks, which was only available in the Third Doctor box set. In 1999 Dapol released six more Daleks, the Melkur and two types of Sontaran. The next year Dapol discontinued the figure range and made 4-inch statues of the Second Doctor and a cyberman from The Moonbase. Though the company planned to continue this range with the First Doctor and a Yeti the BBC opted not to renew Dapol's licence. The company also hosted the Doctor Who Experience exhibition, which showed props and costumes from the original series and ran until 2003. Dapol also produced gift sets containing common figures, typically with one rarity included, and dozens of special edition Daleks, usually to coincide with the latest theme at the exhibition.

=== Corgi ===
In 2003 die-cast model makers Corgi released a model Bessie with The Three Doctors DVD and in early 2004, still for the 40th anniversary, released a limited edition (5,000) TARDIS set featuring an Earthshock Cyberman, Davros, The Fourth Doctor in Bessie, K9 and a Light Gold Dalek. Essentially the same set was re-released months later in a commemorative film can, the differences the inclusion of a Fourth Doctor figure, a figure of the Fourth Doctor peering through the TARDIS and an early silver/blue Dalek. Corgi then released eight different types of Dalek and Davros in sets of three with runs of 7,000, and re-released every figure from the box sets in packs of two. Corgi's final release was a limited edition (2,000) UNIT set featuring a jeep, helicopter and Supreme Dalek.

=== Character Options ===
Since 2005, Character Options (CO) has held the master toy license for producing merchandise primarily inspired by the revived series of Doctor Who. This includes action figures, play sets, electronic variations of the Doctor's sonic screwdriver accessory, an electronic TARDIS-shaped money box, 12-inch and 18-inch radio-controlled Dalek models, electronic masks depicting monsters from the series, and other toys and accessories.

==== Action figures ====
CO's first Doctor Who releases were two Dalek Battle Packs – two 5-inch radio-controlled model Daleks that included either a Ninth Doctor or Rose Tyler action figure – released in 2005. These led to the production of further, more detailed, action figures depicting characters and creatures from the programme, with three 'waves' of posable 5-inch scale figures and RC Dalek and K9 models released in 2006. New figures were released regularly alongside broadcast of the programme, along with larger 'deluxe' and 'Collect & Build' figures, an electronic TARDIS control room play set and other models. From 2007 to 2009, instead of waves, figures were marketed under Series banners based on the series each character depicted appears in. Limited edition and retailer-exclusive figure sets were also released while certain figures received re-releases featuring new sculpts, paint-applications and accessories. The figures received high praise and won Character the 2006 Toy Retailers Association's Boys Toy of the Year Award.

In 2008, Character Options expanded the range to include figures Doctor Who's classic series. While there was an initial lack of interest from major retailers after the release of the first wave, further releases were commissioned by Forbidden Planet and Underground Toys, making 5-inch classic Doctor Who figures exclusive to those retailers. As well as villains, classic-era releases include the first eight incarnations of the Doctor, Dalek and Cyberman variants and various TARDIS exterior play sets.

In 2012, Character Options announced the semi-discontinuation of their 5-inch Doctor Who action figure line in favour of figures produced in a new 3.75-inch scale to match figures and play sets from other brands, allowing further playability for children. The first 3.75-inch figures were released in 2013 depicting characters from the seventh series as well as re-releases of several 5-inch figures in the new scale. Connectable 'Time Zone' play sets including exclusive figures and accessories, an electronic spinning TARDIS exterior and electronic gliding Dalek models were also released. The range was halted in 2015 due to low sales. The 5-inch figure range is currently continuing as a limited collectors' series, with B&M being CO's lead retailer as of 2023.

==== Other ====
Additionally, Character released a series of 12-inch Doctor Who dolls between 2006 and 2007. 10-inch dolls depicting the Eleventh and Thirteenth Doctors were also released in 2011 and 2018, respectively. The company also released the Doctor Who Micro Universe game series in 2007 featuring collectible miniature figurines and ship models based on characters from the programme's first, second and third series. The series was succeeded by the Doctor Who "Time Squad" range – highly stylised (cartoonish) 2-inch figures with variable levels of articulation that came in sets of one to five figures – first released in 2009.

In November 2007, CO released merchandise related to the Doctor Who spin-off series The Sarah Jane Adventures. Originally launching with a Sarah Jane Smith and Star Poet action figure set, the range expanded to include a sonic lipstick & wrist watch scanner set, an electronic Alien Communicator accessory, and twin packs of Sarah Jane Smith action figure variants with various aliens from the first series of the programme. The range was discontinued shortly after due to a lack of customer interest.

The London-based collectables company Sci-Fi Collector also released a range of figures based on the mature Doctor Who spin-off Torchwood. This was an exclusive license granted to the company in favour of mass-production by Character Options.

In 2010, Polish construction toy company COBI teamed up with Character Options to produce Doctor Who construction toys. The line mainly consisted of characters and buildable playsets from the Eleventh Doctor's era of the programme. Figurines were released as collectibles in blind bags that also came with clear stackable cases to display them. Rare and hard-to-find figurines were also released. The line ended in 2014, around the time of the Twelfth Doctor's TV debut.

== Micro-Universe ==
Doctor Who Micro Universe is a very simple collectable miniatures game similar to Top Trumps except with a die. Each figure has a number of characteristics with a numerical value. Choose a characteristic, roll the spinner (a die replacement shaped like the TARDIS console) and add the result to the characteristic's value. Your opponent rolls and adds the same characteristic from his figure and the highest wins that combat. No movement rules included despite this being a miniatures game. They were sold in semi random starters of 7 figures and boosters of 3 figures, plus a TARDIS-shaped carrying case was also released. 26 in the main set and 6 special packs that contain 1 ship (not to scale with the rest of the figures) and one special figure not available in the starters or boosters.

== Commemorative stamps ==
During 1999, the Royal Mail issued twelve sets of postage stamps known as the "Millennium Series". One set of four stamps was issued every month, and each had a common theme. The set issued on 1 June 1999 was named "The Entertainers' Tale", and the 44p stamp featured a Dalek. The others of this set depicted: Freddie Mercury on the 19p stamp; Bobby Moore on the 26p; and Charlie Chaplin on the 64p.

In March 2013, the Royal Mail issued a set of eleven first class stamps in honour of the shows 50th anniversary featuring the faces of the eleven Doctors. There was also a set of five second class stamps that feature the Tardis, a Dalek, an Ood, a Weeping Angel and a Cyberman

== Bakeware ==
In 2013, Kitchenware company, Lakeland, created a range of bakeware, decorations and party products, including cookie cutters, cake moulds, cupcake accessories, napkins, plates, and straws produced under licence.

== See also ==
- Doctor Who books (category)
- Doctor Who magazines (category)
