= List of Doctor Who video games =

Numerous video games based on the popular science-fiction series Doctor Who have been officially released. To date, there have been over 19 Doctor Who video games on various platforms, including mobile games on mobile phones.

== Released games ==
List of games
Year	Title	Platform(s)	Notes
1983	Doctor Who: The First Adventure	BBC Micro	
1985	Doctor Who and the Warlord	BBC Micro	ZX Spectrum version planned but cancelled.
1985	Doctor Who and the Mines of Terror	Amstrad CPC, BBC Micro, Commodore 64	
1992	Dalek Attack	Commodore 64, Amiga, Atari ST, MS-DOS, ZX Spectrum	
1997	Doctor Who: Destiny of the Doctors	Microsoft Windows	
2008	Top Trumps: Doctor Who	Java ME, Microsoft Windows, Nintendo DS, PlayStation 2, Wii	
2010–11	Doctor Who: The Adventure Games	Microsoft Windows, Mac OS	Released episodically with 5 episodes from 2010 to 2011.
2010	Doctor Who: Evacuation Earth	Nintendo DS	
2010	Doctor Who: Return to Earth	Wii	
2010–11	Doctor Who: The Mazes of Time	Android, iOS	
2012	Doctor Who: Worlds in Time	Adobe Flash	Shutdown on March 3, 2014.
2012	Doctor Who: The Eternity Clock	Microsoft Windows, PlayStation 3, PlayStation Vita	
2013	Doctor Who: Legacy	Android, iOS	Shutdown on February 18, 2019.
2014	The Doctor and the Dalek	Browser	Released on the BBC website.
2015	Doctor Who Game Maker	Browser	Released on the BBC website.
2015	Lego Dimensions	PlayStation 3, PlayStation 4, Xbox 360, Xbox One, Wii U	Features the Twelfth Doctor, Clara Oswald and Missy.
2018	Doctor Who: Battle of Time	Android, iOS	Soft-launched on May 30, 2018, in Australia, Canada, New Zealand, Thailand, later shutdown on 26 November of that same year.
2018	Doctor Who Infinity	Microsoft Windows, macOS, Android, iOS	Soft-launched on August 08, 2018 with its first three episodes and 2 final episodes in November 25, 2019, before shutting down and being removed from stores on November 15, 2022
2019–20	Doctor Who: The Runaway	Microsoft Windows	VR game released for the Oculus Rift and HTC Vive in 2019, and via Steam in 2020.
2019–20	Doctor Who: The Edge of Time	Microsoft Windows, Oculus Quest 2, PlayStation 4, PlayStation 5	Available on PlayStation 5 on April 23, 2024
2021	Doctor Who: The Edge of Reality	Microsoft Windows, Nintendo Switch, PlayStation 4, Xbox One	
2021	Doctor Who: The Lonely Assassins	Android, iOS, Microsoft Windows, Nintendo Switch, PlayStation 4, PlayStation 5, Xbox One, Xbox Series X/S	
2022	Doctor Who: Lost in Time	Android, iOS	
2024 (early access)	Doctor Who: Worlds Apart	Android, iOS, macOS, Microsoft Windows	A digital collectible card blockchain game developed and published by Reality Gaming Group, based upon the BBC television series Doctor Who, where each card is minted as an NFT and can be traded and sold on marketplaces. Players control a Time Lord, and need to challenge opponents with card decks which they build. The winning player is the one with the most Power.

== Cancelled games ==
- A game for the Sega Mega Drive was reportedly in development by Sega around the time of the movie but never released.
- IR Gurus were reportedly working on a game to coincide with the 2005 series of the show featuring the Ninth Doctor and Rose. It was in development for half a year but was cancelled with the reason being "it's complicated".

== Related games ==
Year	Title	Platform(s)	Notes
2008	PlayStation Home	PlayStation 3	A Doctor Who world along with environment and customisable options were added with a first wave on March 27, 2013 and a second wave in August, 2013.
2012	The Pinball Arcade	Android, iOS, macOS, PlayStation 3, PlayStation Vita, Microsoft Windows, PlayStation 4, Xbox One, Nintendo Switch	The 1992 Doctor Who pinball machine by Bally was released for the game on October 1, 2016, with an original table Master of Time released for Steam and iOS on December 24, 2016. On June 30, 2018, all Bally pinball tables were removed from the game due to the Williams/Bally license holder not wanting to renew the license with FarSight Studios.
2014	LittleBigPlanet 3	PlayStation 3, PlayStation 4	Four costume packs based around Doctor Who were released through December 2015.: Twelfth Doctor Costume Pack - December 1, 2015; Eleventh Doctor Costume Pack - December 8, 2015; Tenth Doctor Costume Pack - December 15, 2015; Fourth Doctor Costume Pack - December 22, 2015
2015	Lego Dimensions	PlayStation 3, PlayStation 4, Wii U, Xbox 360, Xbox One	Doctor Who featured as part of a level pack.
2020	Fall Guys	Microsoft Windows, PlayStation 4, Nintendo Switch, PlayStation 5, Xbox One, Xbox Series X/S	Costumes featuring the Fourth, Thirteenth and Fourteenth Doctors and a Dalek were available from November 1 to 6, 2022. with costumes featuring the Tenth Doctor, a Cyberman and The TARDIS available from August 15 to 20, 2023.
2021	The Sekimeiya: Spun Glass	Microsoft Windows, Linux PlayStation 4, Nintendo Switch, PlayStation 5, Xbox One, Xbox Series X/S	The character Larles from the Chris Cwej book series makes an appearance in the game. An excerpt from the visual novel featuring Larles was published in the book Cwej: The Complete First Cycle.
