= TARDIS (disambiguation) =

TARDIS is a fictional time machine and spacecraft in the television programme Doctor Who and its associated spin-offs.

TARDIS may also refer to:

- Somerton TARDIS, a police box in Newport, Wales
- 3325 TARDIS, an asteroid
- Tardis Chasma, a chasma on the moon Charon
- Tornado Advanced Radar Display Information System, a part of the Panavia Tornado aircraft
- TARDIS (software), supernovae modelling software

== See also ==
- Tardisbrücke ("Tardis bridge"), a settlement and bridge in Switzerland
- Jacques Tardi (born 1946), French comics artist
- Tardigrade, water-dwelling, eight-legged, segmented micro-animals
