= Somerton, Newport =

Area of Newport, Wales

Coordinates: 51.582848°N 2.962775°W

Somerton
- Location within Newport
- OS grid reference: ST334870
- Principal area: Newport
- Country: Wales
- Sovereign state: United Kingdom
- Post town: NEWPORT
- Postcode district: NP19 0,4,8
- Dialling code: 01633; Maindee exchange
- Police: Gwent
- Fire: South Wales
- Ambulance: Welsh
- UK Parliament: Newport East

Somerton is an area in the south-east of Newport. The northern half of the area is located in the Alway ward with the southern half in the Lliswerry ward – The two halves being separated by the South Wales Main Line. Somerton has a local Primary School and Post Office and is the location of St Patricks RC Church.

Somerton is perhaps best known for Somerton Park – the former home of professional football and speedway in Newport with Newport County and the Newport Wasps.

The neighbourhood is also home to one of the last remaining 'TARDIS' police boxes in the city – the Somerton TARDIS on Chepstow Road.
