= Doctor Who: The Mazes of Time =

2010 video game

- Developer: Tag Games
- Publisher: BBC Worldwide
- Designer: David Hoare
- Writer: Oli Smith
- Series: Doctor Who
- Platforms: IOS, Android
- Release: IOS: EU: 17 December 2010; Android: EU: August 2011
- Genre: Adventure/Puzzle
- Mode: Single player

Doctor Who: The Mazes of Time is a video game for the Apple iOS platform based on the BBC TV series Doctor Who.

It is the first official Doctor Who game to be released through the App Store and was released on the Android platform in August 2011.

== Plot ==
The story features the Eleventh Doctor and Amy arriving on a spaceship broadcasting a distress signal. From there they travel through time and space to save the Jones family from a variety of Doctor Who enemies, including Daleks, Cybermen and Silurians. The Daleks are searching for a Time Engine. The Doctor and Amy reach the Time Engine, find a Dalek Scientist and there is an explosion. From here the player has to stop the Daleks from completing their mission.

== Gameplay ==
The game is played in third-person 3D from a high angle view, and features the Doctor and Amy moving around rooms and mazes solving puzzles. Control is via an on-screen joystick on the touchscreen. The player controls both Amy and the Doctor, who have different capabilities within the game, and can be swapped between at will to assist in solving particular puzzles.

=== Extra Levels ===
- The Christmas Trap (featuring the Autons) - Released 14/01/11
- Angels in the Shadows (featuring the Weeping Angels) - Released 06/05/11

== Audio ==
The game does not feature any voice acting from Matt Smith or Karen Gillan, although sound samples from the show of the enemies are used. Instead all character dialogue is provided with on screen captions. Music was written by Murray Gold.

== Development ==
The game was developed by Dundee based developer, Tag Games.

Announcing the game in November 2010, head of games technology Robert Henning for Tag said "Doctor Who is the UK's number one science fiction property, and I think it is in the BBC's top three for worldwide sales, so it is great to bring it to Dundee — especially in light of what happened at Realtime Worlds and the effect it had on Dundee. It shows there is still something positive we can bring to the sector."

It is the first official Doctor Who game to be released for the IOS platform. The game was written by Oli Smith, who also wrote the Wii and DS games, Return to Earth and Evacuation Earth, which were also released in 2010.

== Reception ==
Gamezebo gave it 3 out 5 stars saying the game "is an enjoyable romp for fans, but at the end of the day, there is simply too much frustration to be had with the controls to give this a solid recommendation."

By lunchtime on the day of its release the game was at number 50 on the app store chart, despite minimal advertising.

Doctor Who TV rated the game 4/5, commenting "Overall, The Mazes of Time is a solid and enjoyable puzzler that we can recommend to all Doctor Who fans."

What's on iPhone gave 4.5/5

Also the game was made 'Game of the Week' for the iPad HD version.

The Android version is reported to run on only a few handsets, with most users reporting that the game crashed (Force closes) as soon as it is launched.
