= Michael Holt (author) =

British author (1929–2003)

Michael Paul Holt (7 January 1929 – 31 December 2003) was a British author of puzzle and quiz books for children, including several Doctor Who related quiz books and Crisis In Space in the Make Your Own Adventure with Doctor Who series.

== Life and career ==
Michael Paul Holt was born in Richmond, Surrey on 7 January 1929. In 1936, aged seven, Holt submitted a theatre review to the Daily Express newspaper. The production of Peter Pan was staged at the London Palladium, and starred Charles Laughton.

He was also the co-author of Puffin Books' Big Book of Puzzles series. Holt taught mathematics and geometry in London schools in the 1960s and 1970s.

Holt died in Herefordshire on 31 December 2003, aged 74.
