= Somerton TARDIS =

Grade II listed building in Newport, Wales

Coordinates: 51.58828°N 2.95935°W

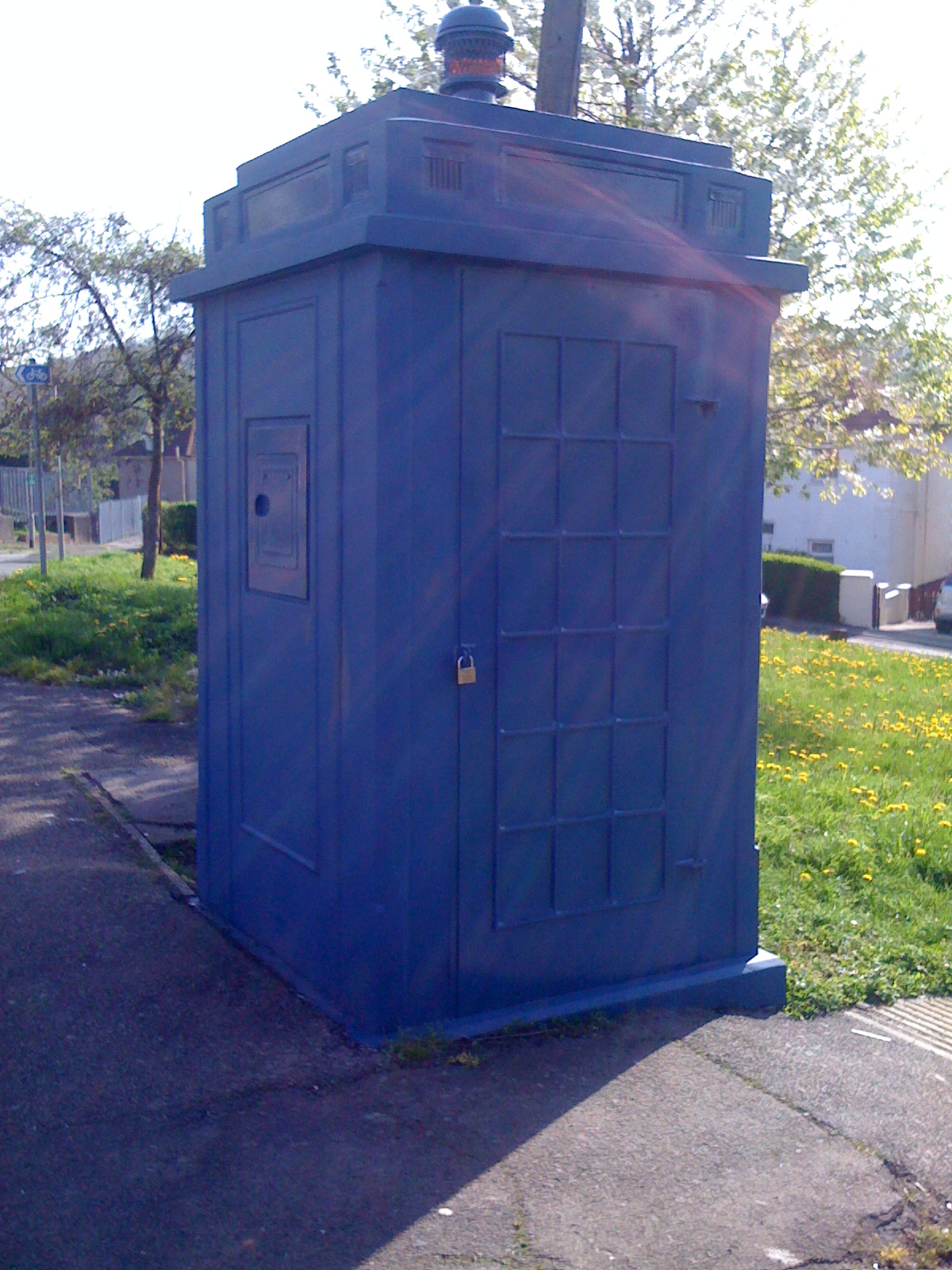
Somerton TARDIS, Newport, 2023

The Somerton TARDIS is a police box on Acacia Avenue beside the B4237 road (Chepstow Road) in the Somerton area of Newport, South Wales. This police box is the only remaining one of four that were in Newport. It is a Grade II listed building.

Police boxes were deployed in the UK as a police telephone communications point before public telephone boxes were widely available. Patrolling police officers or members of the public could contact the local police station using the telephone accessed via an external flap. Internally, the box was a miniature police station. The Somerton police box has a lamp fixing on top which would flash to indicate an incoming call. The first UK police boxes were deployed in 1888; the familiar 'TARDIS' shape first appeared in 1929. UK police discontinued use of such boxes by 1969 with the advent of police personal radios for mobile communications.

The Somerton police box became known in Newport as the TARDIS as a reference to the television series Doctor Who, in which the Doctor's time machine appears as a police box due to its so-called "chameleon circuit" being stuck.

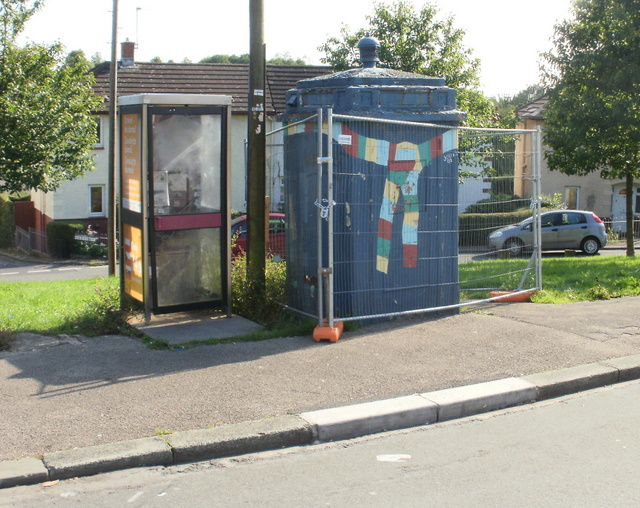
Somerton TARDIS, 2009, showing Tom Baker scarf paintwork

During the 1980s local residents painted a long multi-coloured scarf on the blue police box as worn by the Fourth Doctor, who was played by Tom Baker 1974–1981.

It deteriorated over the years, largely due to concrete cancer. In January 2010 a grant of £10,500 was allocated by Cadw to restore the structure as a recognition of its importance as a local landmark. It is a Grade II listed structure. Cadw's listing record locates the box at the junction with Hawthorn Avenue but notes that this "varies through time and space."
