= 3325 TARDIS =

Main-belt asteroid

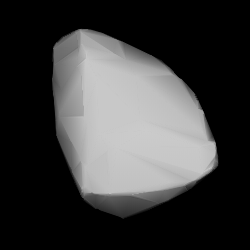
- Shape model of TARDIS from its lightcurve

Discovery
- Discovered by: B. A. Skiff
- Discovery site: Anderson Mesa Stn.
- Discovery date: 3 May 1984

Designations
- Named after: TARDIS (fictional time and space machine)
- Alternative designations: 1984 JZ · 1958 VB_{1} 1969 TP_{3} · 1975 VC_{8} 1975 WF_{1}
- Minor planet category: main-belt · (outer); Alauda

Orbital characteristics
- Epoch 4 September 2017 (JD 2458000.5)
- Uncertainty parameter 0
- Observation arc: 58.56 yr (21,390 days)
- Aphelion: 3.2299 AU
- Perihelion: 3.1397 AU
- Semi-major axis: 3.1848 AU
- Eccentricity: 0.0142
- Orbital period (sidereal): 5.68 yr (2,076 days)
- Mean anomaly: 45.895°
- Mean motion: 0° 10^{m} 24.24^{s} / day
- Inclination: 22.221°
- Longitude of ascending node: 46.246°
- Argument of perihelion: 86.099°

Physical characteristics
- Mean diameter: 28.238±0.469 km 29.66±1.2 km (IRAS:9)
- Geometric albedo: 0.0553±0.005 (IRAS:9); 0.067±0.010
- Absolute magnitude (H): 11.5

3325 TARDIS (provisional designation: 1984 JZ) is a dark Alauda asteroid from the outer region of the asteroid belt, approximately 29 kilometers (18 miles) in diameter. It was discovered on 3 May 1984, by American astronomer Brian Skiff at Lowell's Anderson Mesa Station, Arizona, in the United States. The asteroid was named TARDIS, after the fictional time machine and spacecraft from the science fiction television series Doctor Who.

== Orbit and classification ==
TARDIS is a member of the Alauda family (902), a large family of typically bright carbonaceous asteroids and named after its parent body, 702 Alauda.

It orbits the Sun in the outer main-belt at a distance of 3.1–3.2 AU once every 5 years and 8 months (2,076 days). Its orbit has an eccentricity of 0.01 and an inclination of 22° with respect to the ecliptic. In 1958 it was first identified as 1958 VB_{1} at the Goethe Link Observatory, extending the body's observation arc by 26 years prior to its official discovery at Anderson Mesa.

== Naming ==
It is named after the acronym TARDIS (Time And Relative Dimension In Space), the space and time travel vehicle used by the Doctor in the British science fiction television series Doctor Who. The fictional time machine looks like a police telephone box from mid-twentieth century Britain. The official naming citation was published by the Minor Planet Center on 11 March 1990 (M.P.C. 16041).

== Physical characteristics ==
According to the survey carried out by the Infrared Astronomical Satellite IRAS and NASA's NEOWISE mission, TARDIS measures 28.2 and 29.7 kilometers in diameter, and its surface has a low albedo of 0.055 and 0.067, respectively. An albedo between 0.05 and 0.06 is typical for carbonaceous asteroids of the outer main-belt. As of 2016, no rotational lightcurves have been obtained and the asteroid's period and shape still remains unknown.
