= Lynne Bowker =

Canadian linguist

- Born: 1969 (age 56–57)

Academic background
- Education: BA, Translation, 1991, MA, Applied Linguistics/Translation, 1992, University of Ottawa; PhD, Language Engineering, 1996, University of Manchester Institute of Science and Technology; MSc., Computer Applications for Education, 1999, Dublin City University
- Thesis: A multidimensional approach to classification in terminology: working within a computational framework. (1995)

Lynne Bowker (born 1969) FRSC is a Canadian linguist. She holds the Canada Research Chair in Translation, Technologies, and Society at Université Laval and is a Fellow of the Royal Society of Canada.

== Early life and education ==
Bowker was born in 1969. She earned her Bachelor of Arts and Master's degree from the University of Ottawa before travelling to Europe to attend the University of Manchester Institute of Science and Technology and Dublin City University.

== Career ==
Upon completing her PhD, Bowker joined the faculty at University of Ottawa's School of Translation and Interpretation in 2002. While there, she published Computer Aided Translation Technology: A Practical Introduction and accepted a cross appointment to their School of Information Studies. In 2011, Bowker was named to the Membership Advisory Committee of the Association for Library and Information Science Education for a two-year term. The following year, she was appointed to the rank of Full professor. In 2019 she became a Concordia Library researcher-in-residence to study the best approaches for machine translations. In May 2024 she took up the Canada Research Chair post at Laval.

== Awards ==
In 2013, Bowker was awarded a $15,000 Research award from the Association for Library and Information Science Education (ALISE)/Online Computer Library Center (OCLC) to investigate the use of machine translation in helping newcomers to Canada to make better use of the public library.

In 2015, Bowker received the Canadian Association of Translation Studies Best Paper Award for her article "The Need for Speed! Experimenting with 'Speed Training' in the Scientific/Technical Translation Classroom."

Bowker was elected a Fellow of the Royal Society of Canada for her "research excellence and important contributions throughout her career." In the same year, she was the recipient of the inaugural Open Educational Resources Grant from the university library.

== Selected publications ==
The following is a list of selected publications:

=== Books ===
- Bowker, Lynne (2023). De-mystifying Translation: Introducing Translation to Non-translators. Routledge. doi:10.4324/9781003217718. ISBN 978-1-003-21771-8.
- Bowker, Lynne Bowker; Ciro, Jairo Buitrago (2019). Machine Translation and Global Research: Towards Improved Machine Translation Literacy in the Scholarly Community. Emerald. ISBN 9781787567221.
- Bowker, Lynne; Pearson, Jennifer (2002). Working with Specialized Language: A Practical Guide to Using Corpora. Routledge. ISBN 9780415236997.)
- Bowker, Lynne (2002). Computer-aided Translation Technology: A Practical Introduction. Didactics of Translation. University of Ottawa Press. ISBN 9780776615677.

=== Journal articles ===
- Lynne Bowker and Shane Hawkins. (2006). "Variation in the organization of medical terms: Exploring some motivations for term choice," Terminology: International Journal of Theoretical and Applied Issues in Specialized Communication, 12.1 p. 79 - 110.
- Lynne Bowker. (1998). "Using specialized monolingual native-language corpora as a translation resource: A pilot study," Meta: journal des traducteurs.
