= Doctor Who: Worlds in Time =

2012 video game

- Official logo
- Developer(s): Three Rings Design
- Publisher(s): SEGA / BBC Worldwide
- Platform(s): Adobe Flash
- Release: 12 March 2012
- Genre(s): MMORPG
- Mode(s): Multiplayer

Doctor Who: Worlds in Time was a massively multiplayer online role-playing game (MMORPG) created for the Adobe Flash platform developed by Three Rings Design, a SEGA studio following their acquisition in 2011. It was based on the science fiction series Doctor Who and was commercially released on 12 March 2012 and was closed on 3 March 2014.

== Gameplay ==
Players were able to control the player and the TARDIS as they completed challenges set by The Doctor to save the universe from various enemies. They had to solve puzzles to complete some of the tasks. In most of the adventures, players could also be paired up with other controllable players, or with other real-time players.

=== Missions and Adventures ===
Throughout the game, players were able choose to embark on Missions or Adventures where they were required to complete certain minigames in order to collect shards. The adventures (formerly called Interventions) were plot-driven quests that are divided into story arcs. New planets became available after the successful completion of several adventures.

Just like adventures, missions involved completing a minigame in order to collect shards for the Doctor. They did not affect the plot, however. New missions became available after completing adventures or a previous mission, and players were able to select which missions to accept. There were four types of missions: Planet, Enemy, Reward, and Access. An access mission (also called Doctor Mission) was a special kind of mission that requires three specific shards to be unlocked.

=== Challenges ===
There were six kinds of puzzle-based minigames that players must complete in order to proceed through to the next area of their adventure or mission.

Lockpick: To unlock a door, players must clear the pins out of the tumbler. Players use their gadget to shoot pins onto the lock tumbler to unlock it. When there are three or more pins of the same color aligned, they will disappear.

Repair: To repair terminals or other devices, players must close off a circuit. Players move and rotate wires in order to connect the source to the terminal before time runs out.

Hack: To hack a terminal, players must clear firewalls by clicking a group of two or more blocks of the same color and rotate the board to allow their avatar to enter the system-core.

Barricade: To build a barricade, players must grab and place pieces to create solid rows that block enemy advances. Enemies will continuously break down the barrier, so players must keep building the barricade up.

Combat: To defend against enemies, players must drop blocks into similar colored groups to clear pieces and fill up the opponent's board. Special pieces called breakers are used to destroy the blocks and send damage to the enemy.

Wits: To distract or win over certain characters, players must form chains of three or more pieces by swapping two adjacent pieces.

=== Classes ===
On 18 December 2012, Worlds in Time was updated with a new class system. There were four distinct classes for players to explore: Adventurer, Diplomat, Guardian, and Technologist. Each class offered specialized boosts that assisted players in certain missions. Adventurers were the Jack-of-all-trades, balanced in all aspects. Diplomats were efficient communicators that were stronger in using wits and lockpicks. Guardians were physically able and had boosts in defense and barricade. Technologists were crafty and could do hacks and repairs a little faster than the others. Players were able to switch between the four distinct classes without penalty. The experience they gained advanced the rank of the chosen class.

There were class-exclusive clothing sets available, which were only be collected from shards. More outfits were unlocked as players leveled up their Class Rank.

=== Chronons ===
Chronons were a type of currency used in-game that can be bought through developer Three Rings’ purchase site with real-life currency. These were used to open shards or purchase certain items.

== Development ==
The game was first announced by the BBC Press Office prior to the San Francisco Game Developers Conference on 24 February 2011.

On 17 November 2011, it was announced through a press release that publisher Sega would be collaborating with BBC Worldwide in the production of the game after having acquired Three Rings Design.

An open preview of the game began on 20 December 2011.

On the 15 January 2014, it was announced through a member email distribution stating "We are sorry to report that Doctor Who: Worlds in Time will discontinue service on Monday, March 3rd, 2014 at noon PST". No reason was given.
