= Doctor Who: Evacuation Earth =

2010 video game

- Developer: Asylum Entertainment
- Publisher: Asylum Entertainment
- Producers: Glen Parry; Simon Bailey; Howard Neumark
- Writer: Oli Smith
- Composer: Chris Green
- Series: Doctor Who
- Platform: Nintendo DS
- Release: EU: 12 November 2010
- Genres: Adventure, puzzle
- Mode: Single-player

Doctor Who: Evacuation Earth is a video game for the Nintendo DS based on the BBC TV series Doctor Who, developed by British studio Asylum Entertainment.

The game is written by Doctor Who writer Oli Smith and features Matt Smith and Karen Gillan providing voices for their characters.

It is the second Doctor Who video game to be released for the DS after the port of Top Trumps: Doctor Who.

== Plot ==
The story features both the Daleks and Silurians. As humans attempt to evacuate the Earth, the Doctor and Amy become caught up in a crisis involving a Silurian ship concealed beneath the evacuation vessel, before a Dalek ship intervenes and forces the Doctor to assist in repairing it.

== Development ==
On 12 March 2010, it was first reported that Nintendo had signed a £10 million contract with the BBC to bring Doctor Who to the Wii and DS consoles.

On 24 August 2010, it was revealed the game would be titled Doctor Who: Evacuation Earth and would be released with a Wii counterpart titled Doctor Who: Return to Earth. In a press release managing director Simon Bailey of Asylum Entertainment said "We are incredibly excited to be collaborating with BBC Worldwide on these two new games," further saying "It is our firm belief that the franchise has massive potential on the Nintendo DS and Wii formats and it's an honour to be bringing 'Doctor Who' video games to the show's huge fan base".

== Reception ==
Reception

Aggregate score
Aggregator	Score
GameRankings	56.83% (6 reviews)

Video game talk show Good Game's two presenters gave the game a 3/10 and 2/10 saying "...it makes the fatal mistake of ignoring pretty much everything that makes Doctor Who great." Also claiming that the developers just grabbed a puzzle game off the shelf, but not a very good one, scribbled out the title and stuck a Doctor Who sticker in its place.

Some coverage of the game in Official Nintendo Magazine described it as aimed primarily at younger players, noting its puzzles and humour, which may appeal more to a younger audience than older fans.

== See also ==
- Doctor Who: Return to Earth - another video game released alongside Evacuation Earth
