= Dalek Attack =

1992 video game

- Developer: Alternative Software
- Publisher: Alternative Software
- Platforms: MS-DOS, ZX Spectrum, Commodore 64, Amiga, Atari ST
- Release: October 1992
- Genre: Platform
- Modes: Single player, multiplayer

Dalek Attack is a 1992 video game based on the long-running British science fiction television series Doctor Who, in which the player controls the Doctor and fights recurring adversaries, the Daleks and other enemies. In most versions of the game, the player can choose between playing as Fourth, Fifth or Seventh Doctor; in the MS-DOS and Amiga versions, the player can play as the Second, Fourth or Seventh Doctor, and in the ZX Spectrum version only the Seventh Doctor was available. A second player may play as the Doctor's companion (Ace or a UNIT soldier, although in the Spectrum version only Ace is available). K-9 also makes appearances later in the game as does Davros, creator of the Daleks in the TV series, as the final end of level boss. The game is set in London, Paris, New York, Tokyo and Skaro.

The game was released on all major formats of the time except for the Amstrad CPC, which was announced but never released. It was designed and storyboarded by 221B Software Development. Graphics were by John Gyarmati and Wayne Dalton. Nick Kimberley programmed the PC, Spectrum and (unreleased) Amstrad versions. The Amiga and Atari ST versions were programmed by Richard Turner. Jason Heggie was in charge of the Commodore 64 version. Music was by Paul Tankard. On the PC and Amiga versions, there was a secret room behind some blocks. The room gave some of the programming credits for each game, in particular the graphics and music. The credits were hidden in this way due to the BBC not wanting individual credits for the game development team to be included in the game.

The ZX Spectrum version was released in 1993 after a successful campaign by Your Sinclair readers as Alternative Software were unsure whether the Spectrum release would be commercially viable. Dalek Attack became the last full-price licensed game to be released for the machine. It differed from all the others in its first level; in all the other releases the first level involved the Doctor on a hoverboard going along the sewer. The Spectrum version had the Doctor on foot running around collecting hostages and avoiding globes. The Spectrum version also lost out on other features such as different enemies; only the Robomen, Ogrons and standard Daleks featured. The end-level guardians were also different. Before its release Spectrum owners who wrote to Alternative Software pressing for a release received a letter back stating that the game was in production, and were sent a sticker depicting the game's box front emblazoned with the legend "I've Been Exterminated!"

Other versions of the game featured special Daleks such as hovering Daleks from the TV Century 21 comics strips of the 1960s. 1960s "movie" Daleks also made an appearance, as did the special weapons Dalek from Remembrance of the Daleks. Another special Dalek also featured, based on a sketch by Dalek designer Ray Cusick in an article from the 1989 Doctor Who Magazine 10th Anniversary Special showing how a Dalek might look in the 1990s.

The game was later re-released, first in a three pack compilation set called the Sci-Fi Collection with two other titles (Galactic Warrior Rats, Suburban Commando) for the PC. The front cover was in a "Y" shape with Dalek Attack in the bottom right and the instruction booklet was photocopied. This was followed in 1994/95 by another re-release, which was the same as the original except for a purple and black border added to the front and back covers.
