= Doctor Who and the Warlord =

1985 video game

- Publisher: BBC Software
- Designer: Graham Williams
- Series: Doctor Who
- Platform: BBC Micro
- Release: 1985
- Genre: Text adventure

Doctor Who and the Warlord is a computer game based on the long-running British science fiction television series Doctor Who, released for the BBC Micro in 1985. It was promoted as part of the BBC Computer Literacy Project, with one such instance being after a 1985 screening of the 1966 film Daleks – Invasion Earth: 2150 A.D..

== Gameplay ==
It is a text-based adventure featuring an unspecified Doctor (possibly the Sixth, as he was the current Doctor at the time). The game loaded in two parts, with a password and information from the first half needed to successfully continue into the second part. Each part was recorded on one side of the cassette. There were over 250 locations in each.

== Development ==
Former series producer Graham Williams was one of the designers of the game. A ZX Spectrum version was planned but never released.
