= Doctor Who: Return to Earth =

2010 video game

- European cover art
- Developer: Asylum Entertainment
- Publisher: Asylum Entertainment
- Director: Jon Hare
- Producers: Glen Parry; Simon Bailey; Howard Neumark
- Designer: Steve Venezia
- Programmers: Paul Johnson; Steve Haggerty; Michael Bobotsaris
- Writer: Oli Smith
- Composers: Chris Green; Glen Parry
- Series: Doctor Who
- Platform: Wii
- Release: EU: 19 November 2010; AU: 25 November 2010
- Genre: Action-adventure
- Mode: Single-player

Doctor Who: Return to Earth is a video game for the Nintendo Wii based on the BBC TV series Doctor Who, developed by British studio Asylum Entertainment. The game was released for distribution in limited markets, including the United Kingdom, Australia, and selected European markets.

The game is written by Doctor Who writer Oli Smith and features Matt Smith and Karen Gillan providing voices for their characters.

It was the second Doctor Who video game released for the Wii after the Wii port of Top Trumps: Doctor Who. The game received generally negative reviews from critics.

== Plot ==
The Doctor and Amy arrive on the deserted starship the Lucy Gray, which was the first ship to return to Earth after the solar storms of the 26th century. However, on the ship are the Daleks and Cybermen, who are after the dangerous Time Axis. The Doctor and Amy must prevent them from obtaining it.

== Development ==
On 12 March 2010, it was first reported that Nintendo had signed a £10 million contract with the BBC to bring Doctor Who to the Wii and DS consoles.

On 24 August 2010, it was revealed the game would be titled Doctor Who: Return to Earth and would be released with a DS counterpart titled Doctor Who: Evacuation Earth. In a press release managing director Simon Bailey of Asylum Entertainment said "We are incredibly excited to be collaborating with BBC Worldwide on these two new games," further saying "It is our firm belief that the franchise has massive potential on the Nintendo DS and Wii formats and it's an honour to be bringing 'Doctor Who' video games to the show's huge fan base".

Doctor Who: Return To Earth features the Cybermen and Daleks, unlike its Nintendo DS counterpart, which features The Doctor's other enemies.

On 6 September 2010, it was announced that the game would support a Wii Remote accessory modelled to look like the Eleventh Doctor's sonic screwdriver.

== Reception ==
The game has been notable for receiving negative reception from critics. Official Nintendo Magazine gave the game a 19% rating, and branded it "an insult to Doctor Who fans".

Australian video game talk show Good Game's two presenters gave the game a 1 and 1.5 out of 10, saying, "It's one of the worst games I've ever played." They also stated that the graphics looked like a PlayStation or Nintendo 64 game and that the player spends as much time trying to see the enemies as trying to avoid them. The reviewers went on to state that the game had only two good points, the Sonic Screwdriver Wii remote cover and that it makes Doctor Who: Evacuation Earth (which was given scores of 2 and 3 out of 10 by them) look like a masterpiece.

Metro called the game as "irremediably awful" with a score 1 out of 10.

Digital Spy also reviewed Return to Earth, saying that "The Doctor's first true Wii outing is poorly designed and incredibly frustrating to play."

NGamer gave the game 15% and told readers to "avoid [Return to Earth] like it's a Dalek whose pint you've just spilt".

== See also ==
- Doctor Who: Evacuation Earth - another video game released alongside Return to Earth
- List of video games notable for negative reception
