= TARDIS =

Fictional time-travelling device

- Doctor Who television series element
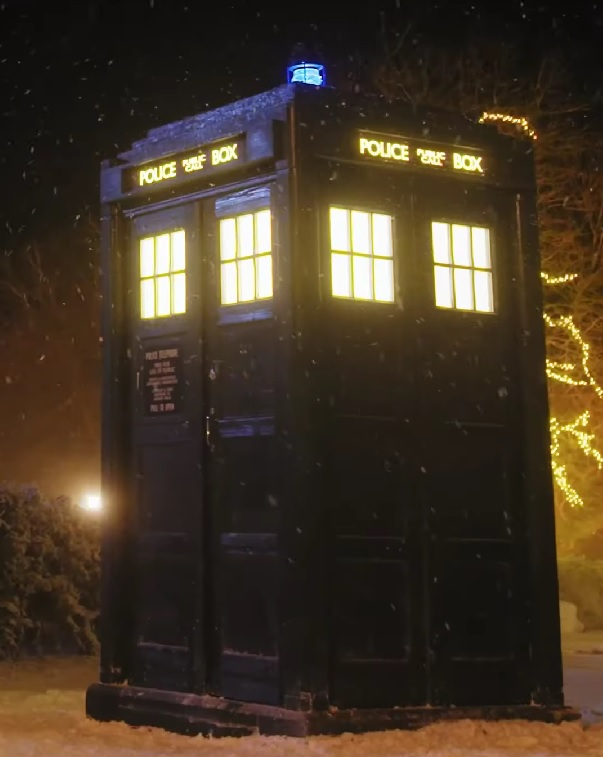
- The Doctor's TARDIS as it has appeared since 2018
- Publisher: BBC
- First appearance: An Unearthly Child (1963)
- Created by: Sydney Newman; C. E. Webber; Donald Wilson; Anthony Coburn
- Genre: Science fiction

In-universe information
- Type: Time machine/spacecraft
- Function: Travels through time and space
- Traits and abilities: Can change its outer dimensions and inner layout, impregnable, telepathic
- Affiliation: Time Lords

The TARDIS (/ˈtɑːr.dɪs/; acronym for "Time And Relative Dimension(s) In Space") is a fictional hybrid of a time machine and spacecraft that has, since 1963, appeared in the British science fiction television series Doctor Who and its various spin-offs. While a TARDIS is capable of disguising itself, the exterior appearance of the Doctor's TARDIS typically mimics a police box, an obsolete type of telephone kiosk that was once commonly seen on streets in Britain in the 1940s and 50s. Its interior is shown as being much larger than its exterior, commonly described as being "bigger on the inside".

Due to the significance of Doctor Who in popular British culture, the shape of the police box is now more strongly associated with the TARDIS than its real-world inspiration. The name and design of the TARDIS is a registered trademark of the British Broadcasting Corporation (BBC), although the design was originally created by the Metropolitan Police Service.

== Name ==
TARDIS is an acronym of "Time And Relative Dimension in Space". The word "Dimension" is alternatively rendered in the plural. The first story, An Unearthly Child (1963), used the singular "Dimension". The 1964 novelisation Doctor Who in an Exciting Adventure with the Daleks used "Dimensions" for the first time and the 1965 serial The Time Meddler introduced the plural in the television series – although the script had it as singular, actor Maureen O'Brien changed it to "Dimensions". Both continued to be used during the classic series; in "Rose" (2005), the Ninth Doctor uses the singular (although this was a decision of actor Christopher Eccleston—the line was plural in the script for the episode) and the series has continued with the singular from that point forward. The acronym was explained in the first episode of the show, An Unearthly Child (1963), in which the Doctor's granddaughter, Susan, claims to have made it up herself. Despite this, the term is used commonly by other Time Lords to refer to both the Doctor's and their own time ships.

Generally, "TARDIS" is written in all uppercase letters, but may also be written in title case as "Tardis". The word "Tardis" first appeared in print in the Christmas 1963 edition of Radio Times, which refers to "the space-time ship Tardis".

== Description ==
Real-world police boxes

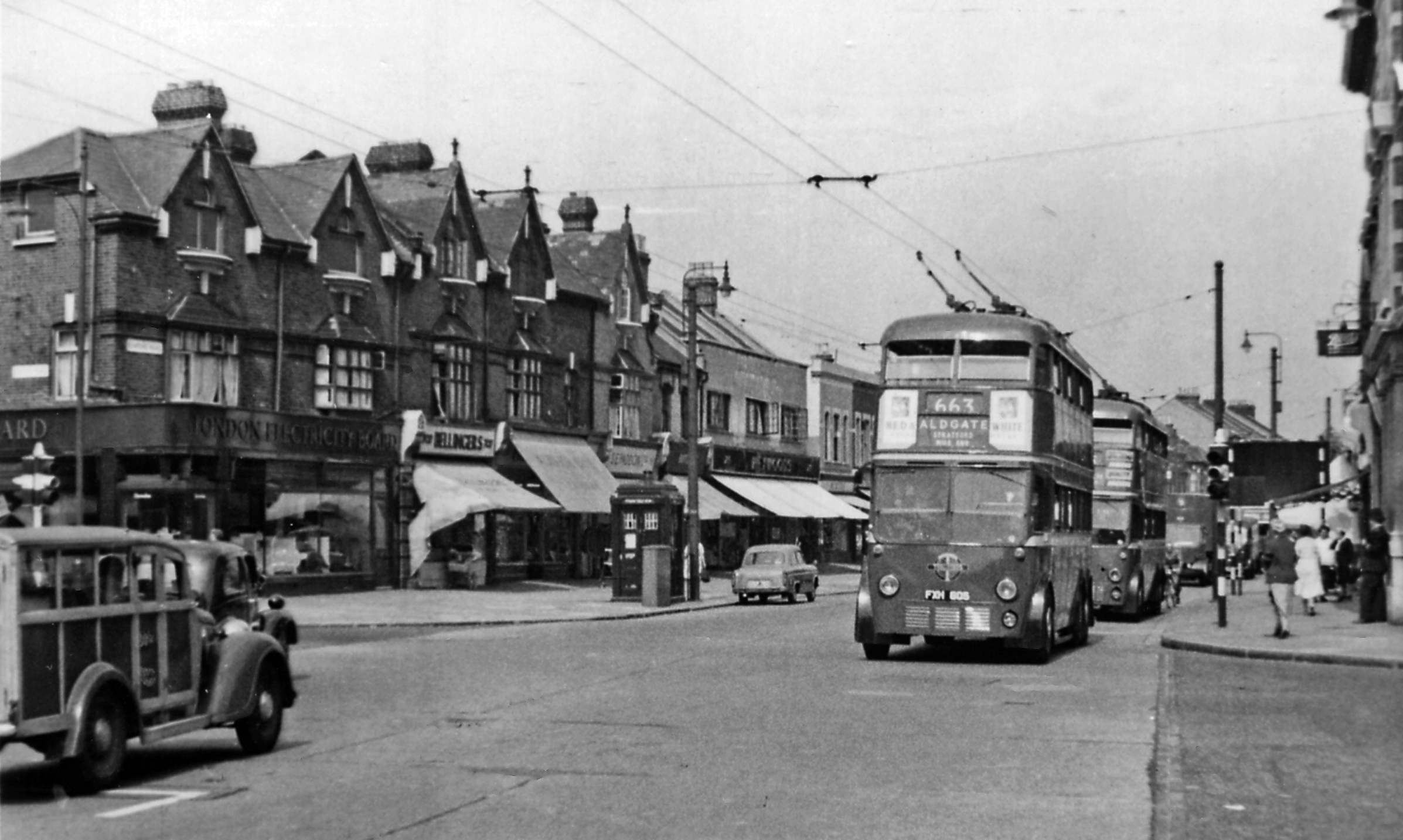
A police box is visible in this 1955 photograph of a street in Ilford in London.

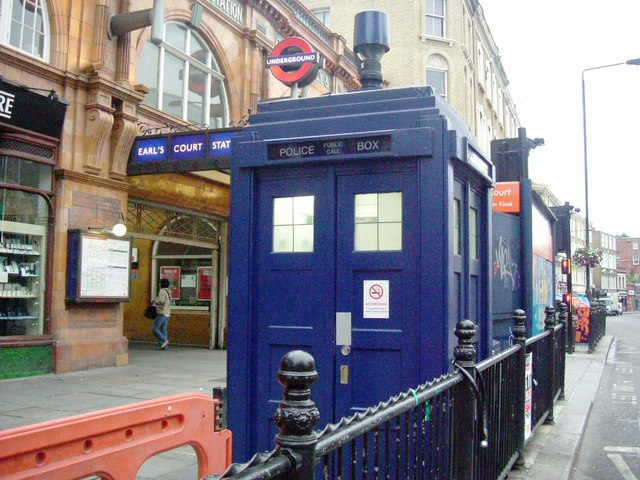
A police box still stands outside Earl's Court tube station in London.

Police boxes were once a common sight on British streets.

In the fictional universe of the Doctor Who television show, TARDISes are space- and time-travel vehicles of the Time Lords, an alien species from the planet Gallifrey. Although many TARDISes exist and are sometimes seen on-screen, the television show mainly features a single TARDIS used by the show's protagonist, a Time Lord who goes by the name of the Doctor. He noted in Episode 3 of The Chase that he had built it himself.

TARDISes are built with a "chameleon circuit", a type of camouflage technology that changes the exterior form of the ship to blend into the environment of whatever time or place it lands in. The Doctor's TARDIS always resembles a 1960s London police box, an object that was very common in Britain at the time of the show's first broadcast, owing to a malfunction in the chameleon circuit before the events of the first episode of the show, An Unearthly Child. The Doctor has attempted to repair the chameleon circuit, unsuccessfully in Logopolis (1981) and with only temporary success in Attack of the Cybermen (1985). In "Boom Town", the Doctor reveals that he has stopped trying to repair the circuit as he has become fond of its appearance. The other TARDISes that appear in the series have chameleon circuits that are fully functional.

The TARDIS is famously "bigger on the inside". A much larger control room lies inside the police box, at the centre of which is a console for operating the TARDIS. In the middle of the console is a moving tubular device, typically referred to as the time rotor, which moves in sequence with the flight sound effects. The presence of a physically larger space contained within the police box is explained as "dimensionally transcendental", with the interior being a whole separate dimension containing an infinite number of rooms, corridors and storage spaces, all of which can change their appearance and configuration.

The TARDIS also has a telepathic feature/translation circuit that allows the Doctor and others to communicate with people who speak languages other than their own, as well as turn all written languages to English. The translation circuit has been explored in comparison with real-world machine translation, with researchers Mark Halley and Lynne Bowker concluding that "when it comes to the science of translation technology, Doctor Who gets it wrong more often than it gets it right. However, perhaps we can forgive the artistic license if we recognise that, as in other science fiction works, the presentation of some type of ubiquitous translation tool is necessary to explain to the audience how people from other countries, time periods, and even other worlds, can understand each other and indeed appear to speak (mostly) flawless English." The TARDIS is also able to generate a "perception filter" that causes people to ignore it, thinking that it is normal.

== Conceptual history ==
=== Exterior design ===
When Doctor Who was being developed in 1963 the production staff discussed what the Doctor's time machine would look like. To keep the design within budget it was decided to make the outside resemble a police telephone box, a common piece of street furniture that had originally been designed in the 1920s by the Scottish architect Gilbert Mackenzie Trench. The idea for the police-box disguise came from a BBC staff writer, Anthony Coburn, who rewrote the programme's first episode from a draft by C. E. Webber. While there is no known precedent for this notion, a November 1960 episode of the popular radio comedy show Beyond Our Ken included a sketch featuring a time machine described as "a tall telephone box".

The concept of a cloaking mechanism (later referred to as the "chameleon circuit") was devised to explain this. In the first episode, An Unearthly Child (1963), the TARDIS is first seen hidden in a London scrapyard in 1963, and after travelling back in time ("The Cave of Skulls") to the Paleolithic era, the police box exterior persists. In a subsequent story, The Time Meddler (1965), the First Doctor explains that the TARDIS should automatically adopt a disguise, such as a howdah (a carrier on the back of an Indian elephant in the Indian Mutiny) or a rock on a beach.

Accounts differ as to the origin of the police box prop. While the BBC asserts that it was constructed specially for Doctor Who, it has been claimed that the box was a reused prop from the BBC television police dramas Z-Cars or Dixon of Dock Green (a claim repeated by Doctor Who producer Steven Moffat).

The dimensions and colour of the TARDIS police box props used in the series have changed many times, as a result of damage and the requirements of the show, and none of the BBC props has been a faithful replica of the original MacKenzie Trench model. Numerous details have been altered over time, including the shape of the roof, the signage, the shade of blue paint, the presence of a St John Ambulance emblem and the overall height of the box. The original prop remained in use for around 13 years until it collapsed – reportedly on Elisabeth Sladen's head. A new prop was introduced for The Masque of Mandragora in 1976, and there have been at least six versions in total. The evolution of the prop design was referenced on-screen in the episode "Blink" (2007), when the character Detective Inspector Shipton says the TARDIS "isn't a real [police box]. The phone's just a dummy, and the windows are the wrong size." (Note: The episode's writer Steven Moffat confirmed that this line was an in-joke aimed at fans on "Internet forums".)

The evolving TARDIS police box prop

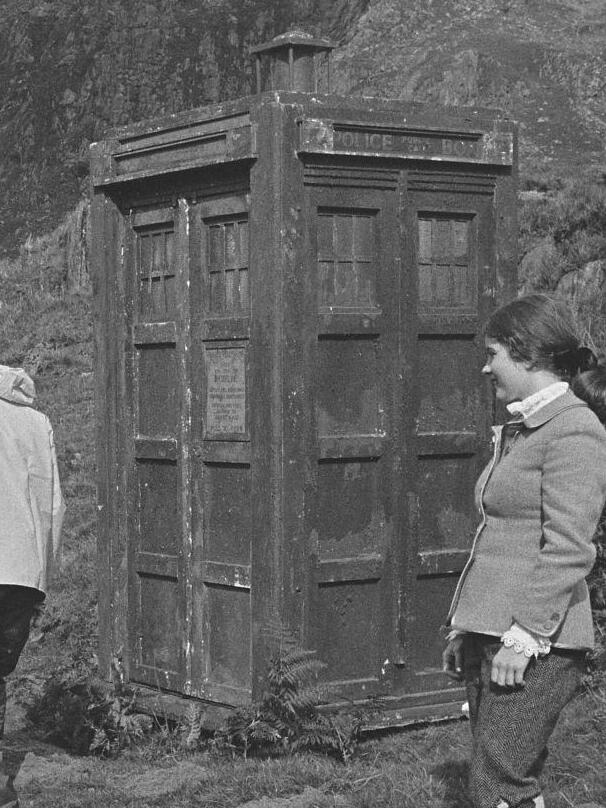
1967-1969 version (during location filming for The Abominable Snowmen, 1967)

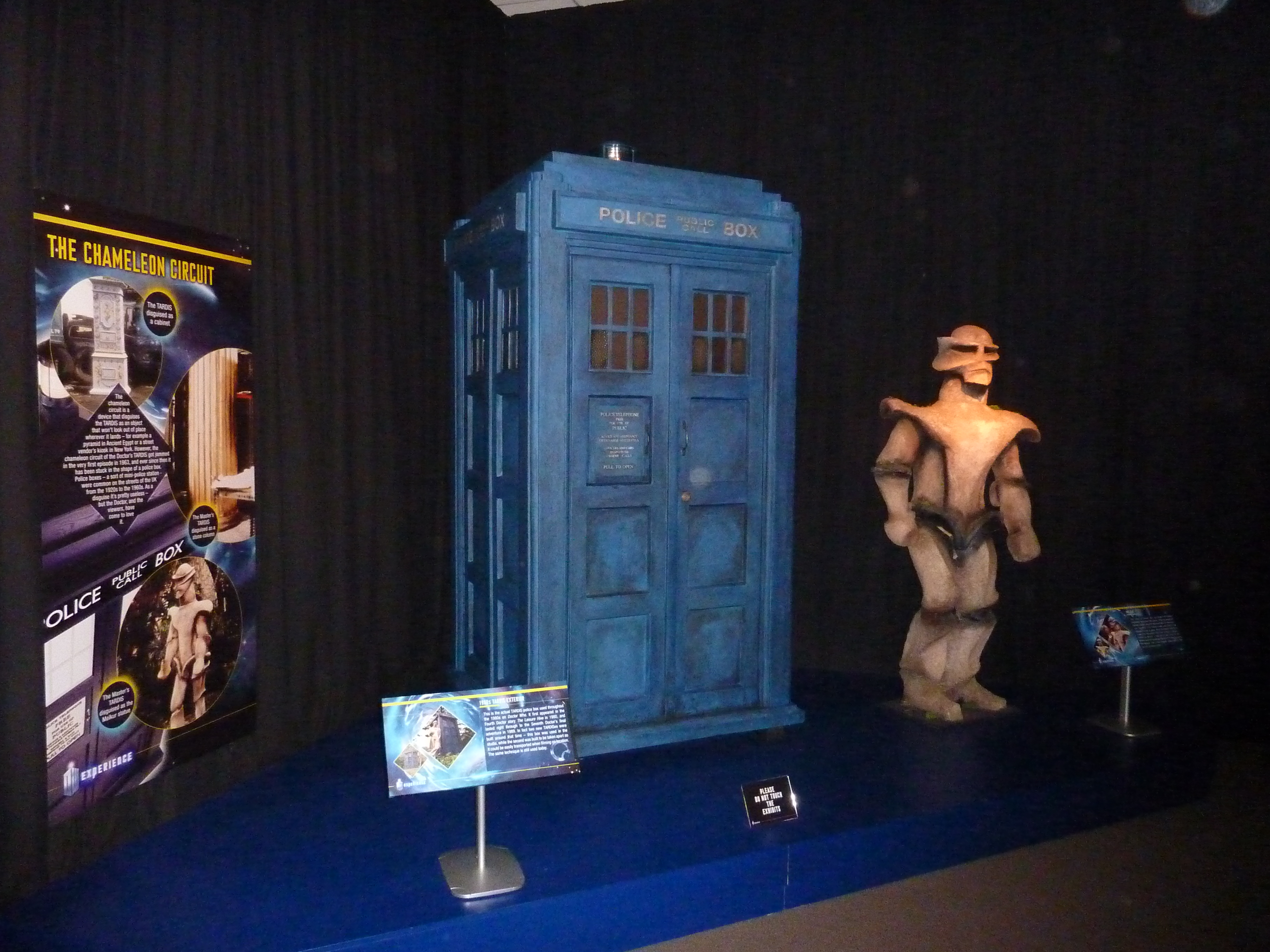
1980-1982 version (displayed at the Doctor Who Experience)

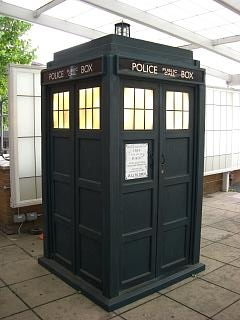
2005-2010 version (displayed at BBC Television Centre)

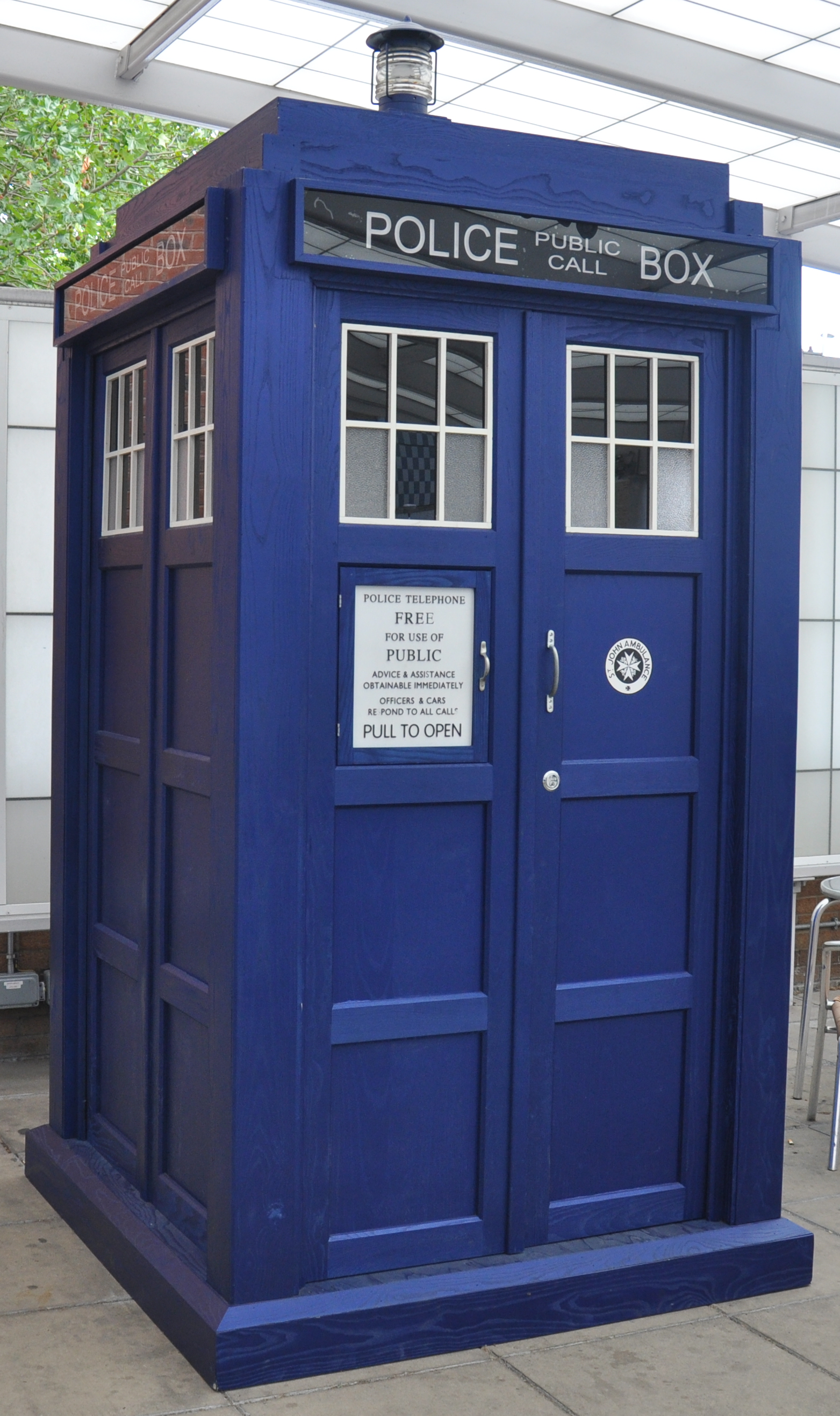
2010-2017 version (displayed at BBC Television Centre)

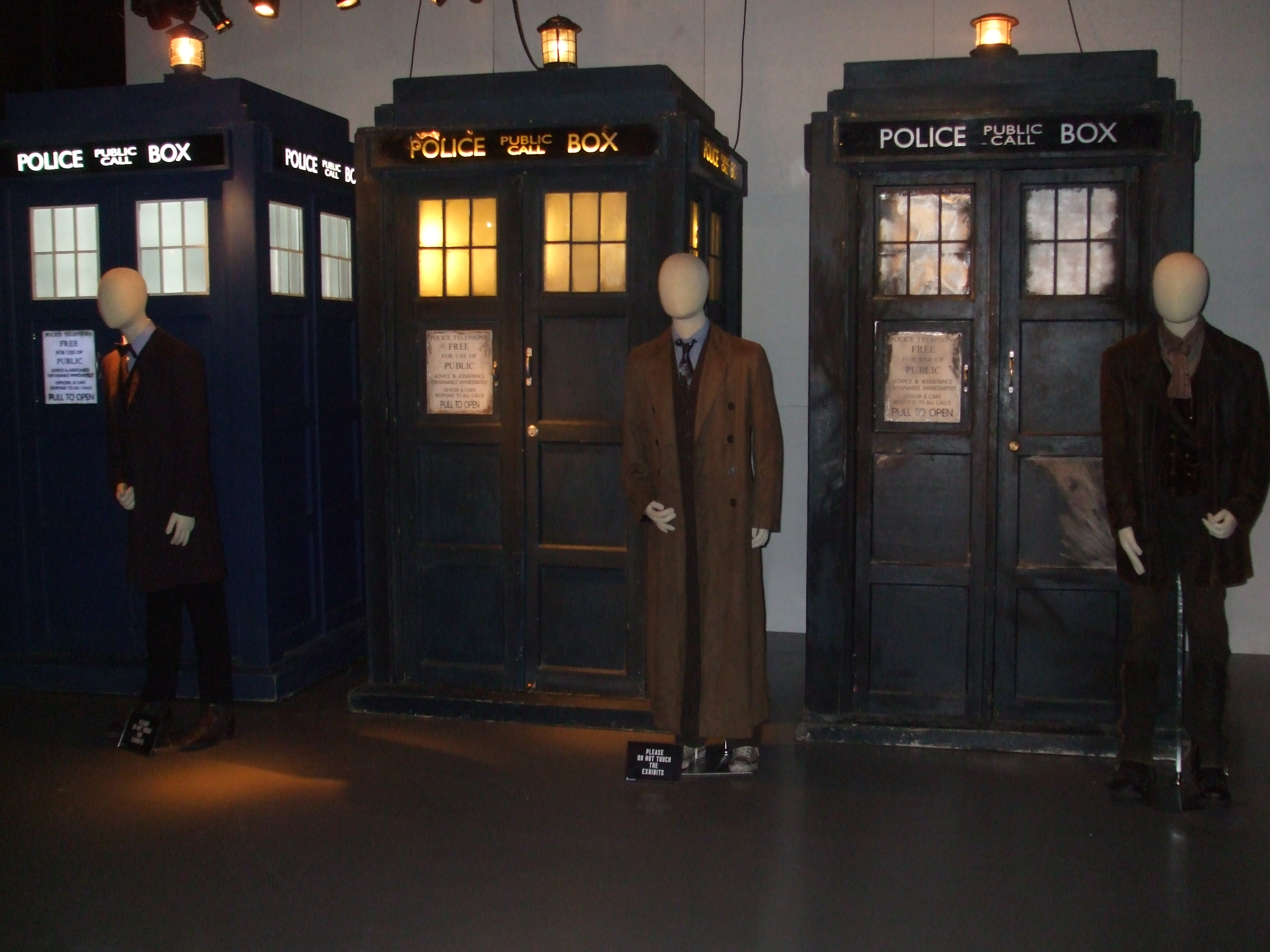
Differing prop versions (displayed at the Doctor Who Experience in 2013)

=== Interior design ===
The original TARDIS console room was designed for the first episode by set designer Peter Brachacki and was unusually large for a BBC production of this time. It was noted for its innovative, gleaming white "futuristic" appearance.

Like the police box prop, the set design of the TARDIS interior has evolved over the years. From the inception of the show in 1963 up until the end of the "classic series" in 1989, the design of the TARDIS console room remained largely unchanged from Brachacki's original set, a brightly lit white chamber, lined with a pattern of roundels on the walls and with a central hexagonal console which contained a cylindrical "time rotor" that moved when the TARDIS was in transit. Numerous alterations were made to the central console and to the layout, but the overall concept remained constant. In Season 14 (1976–77), a dark wood-panelled "Control Room Number 2" was briefly used for a few episodes, but the white console room set was reinstated in Season 15, due to the set warping in storage. After the cancellation of the television show, a radically redesigned TARDIS set was used in the 1996 TV movie, heralding a move to a more steampunk-inspired set design, which later influenced the set design in the revived series from 2005 onwards.

The evolving TARDIS interior sets 1963–2017

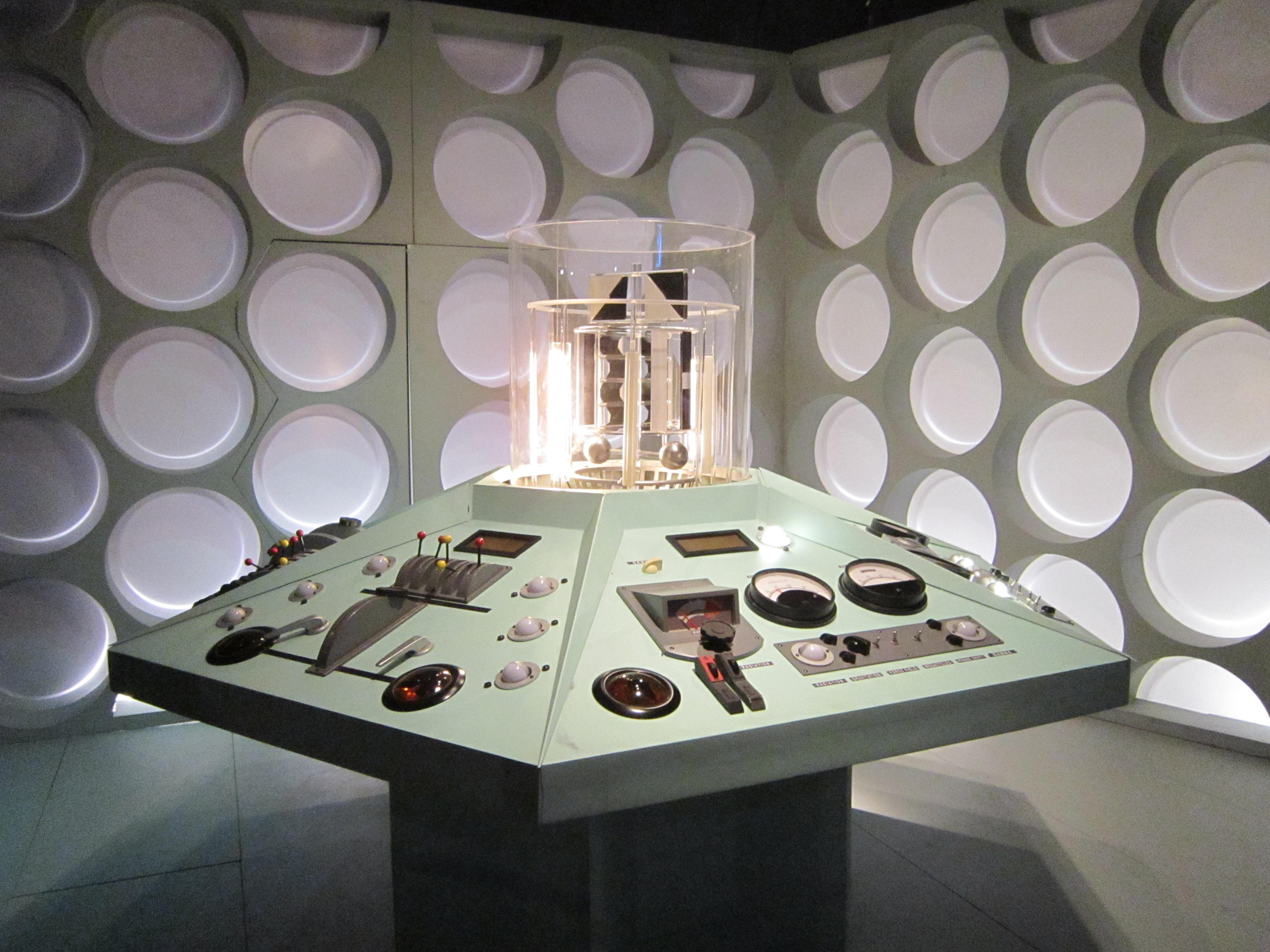
The original 1963 set (2014 reproduction)

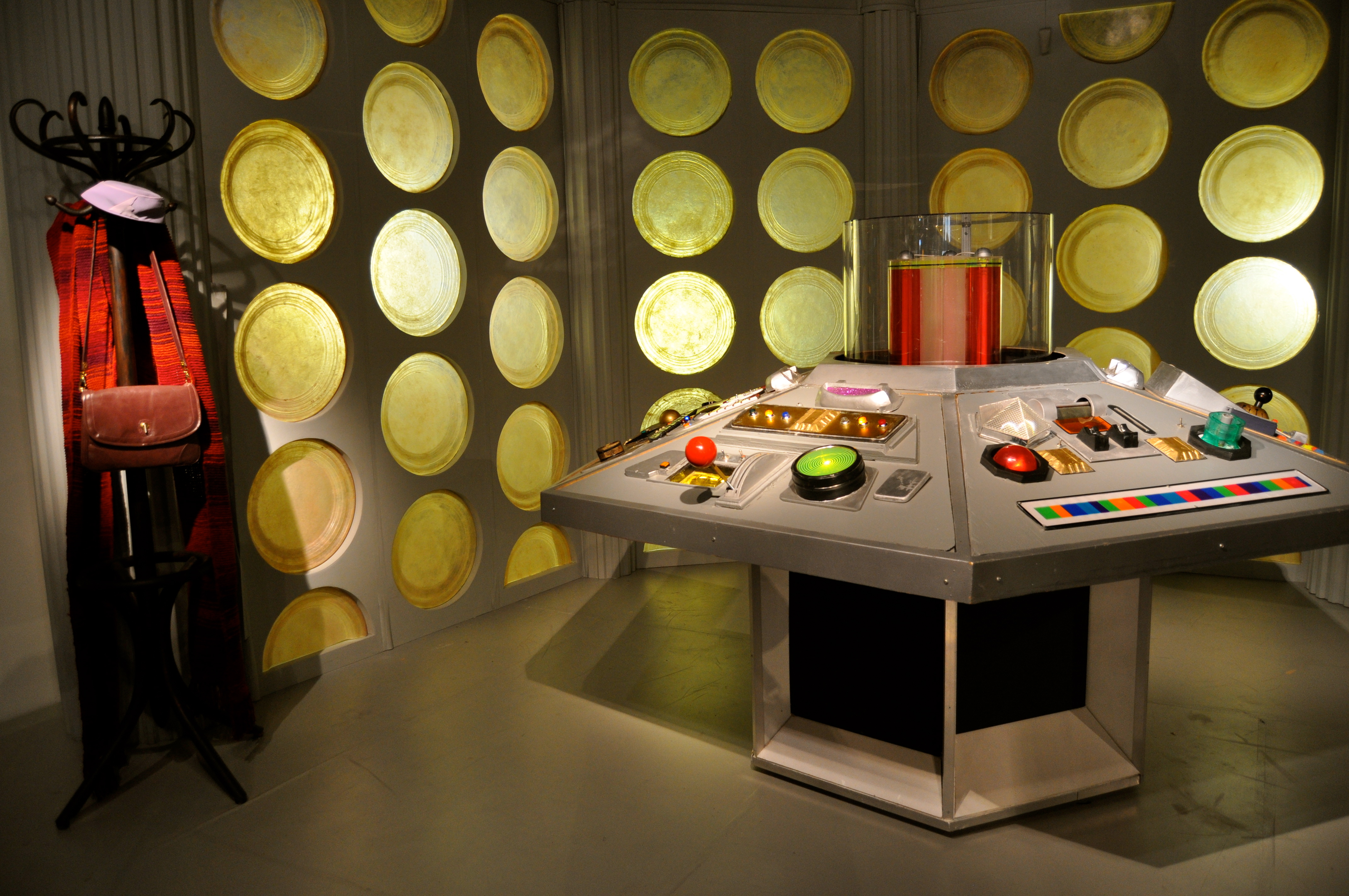
The console room set used from 1977 to 1983

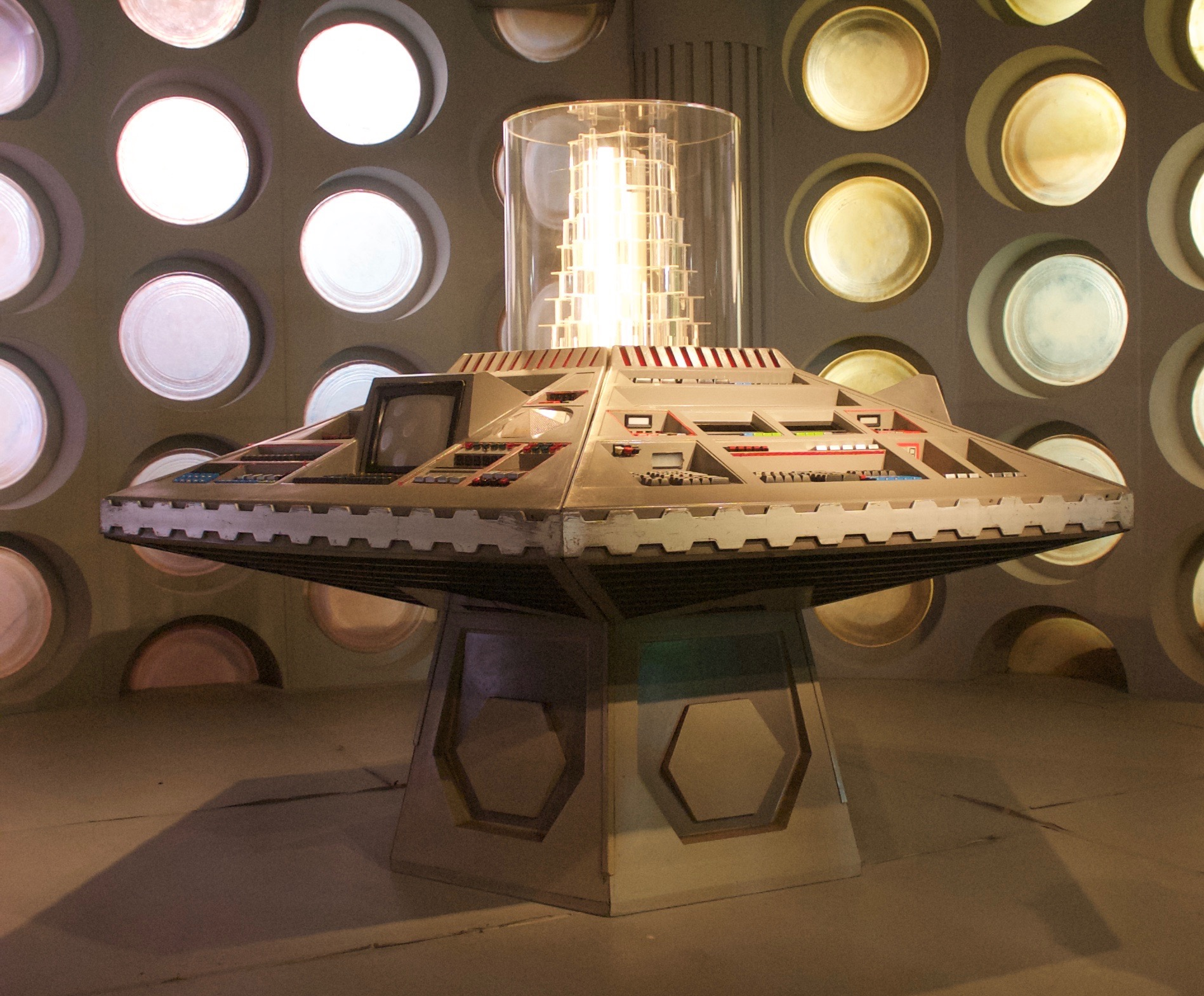
The updated console room set used from 1983 to 1989

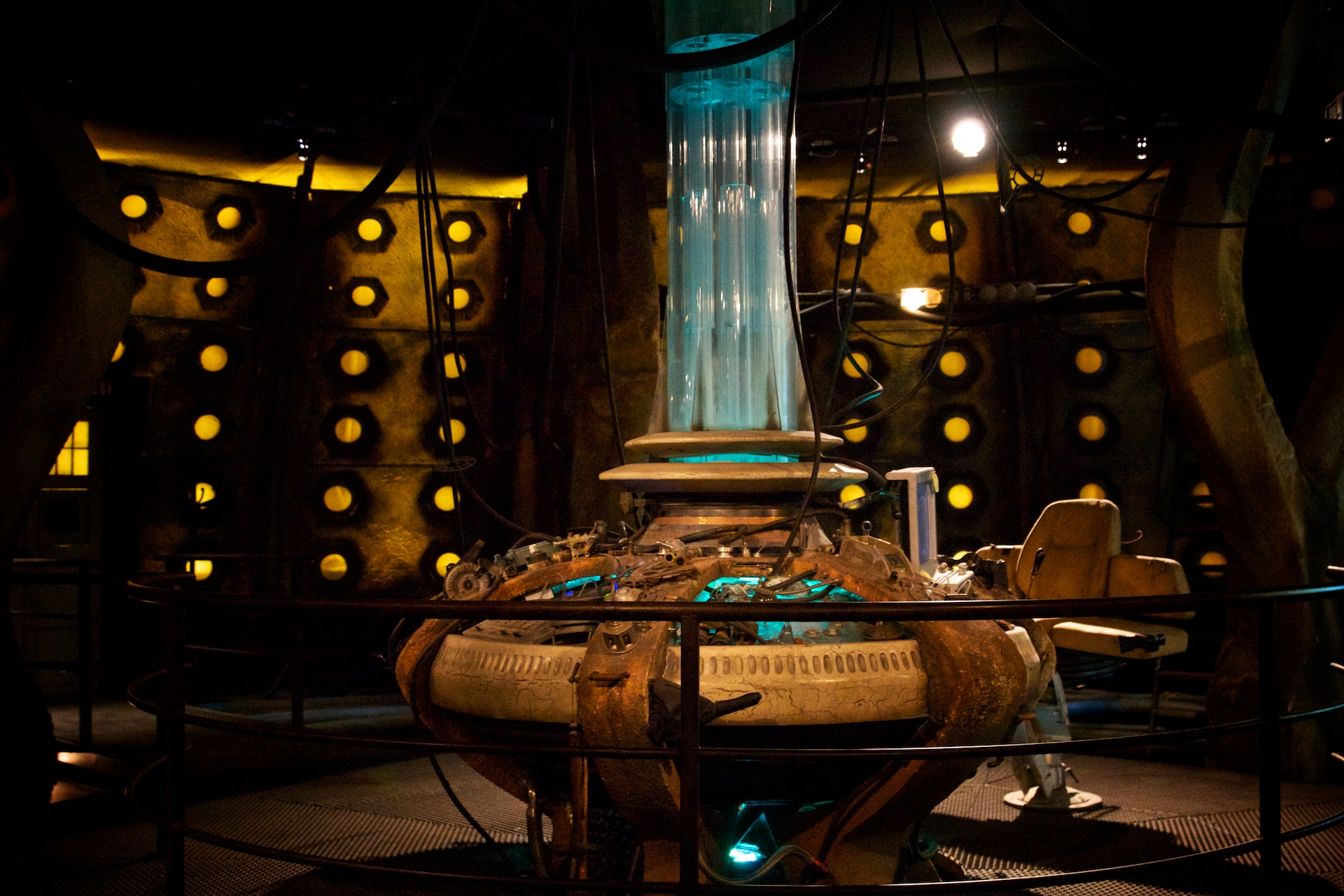
The redesigned set from 2005 to 2010

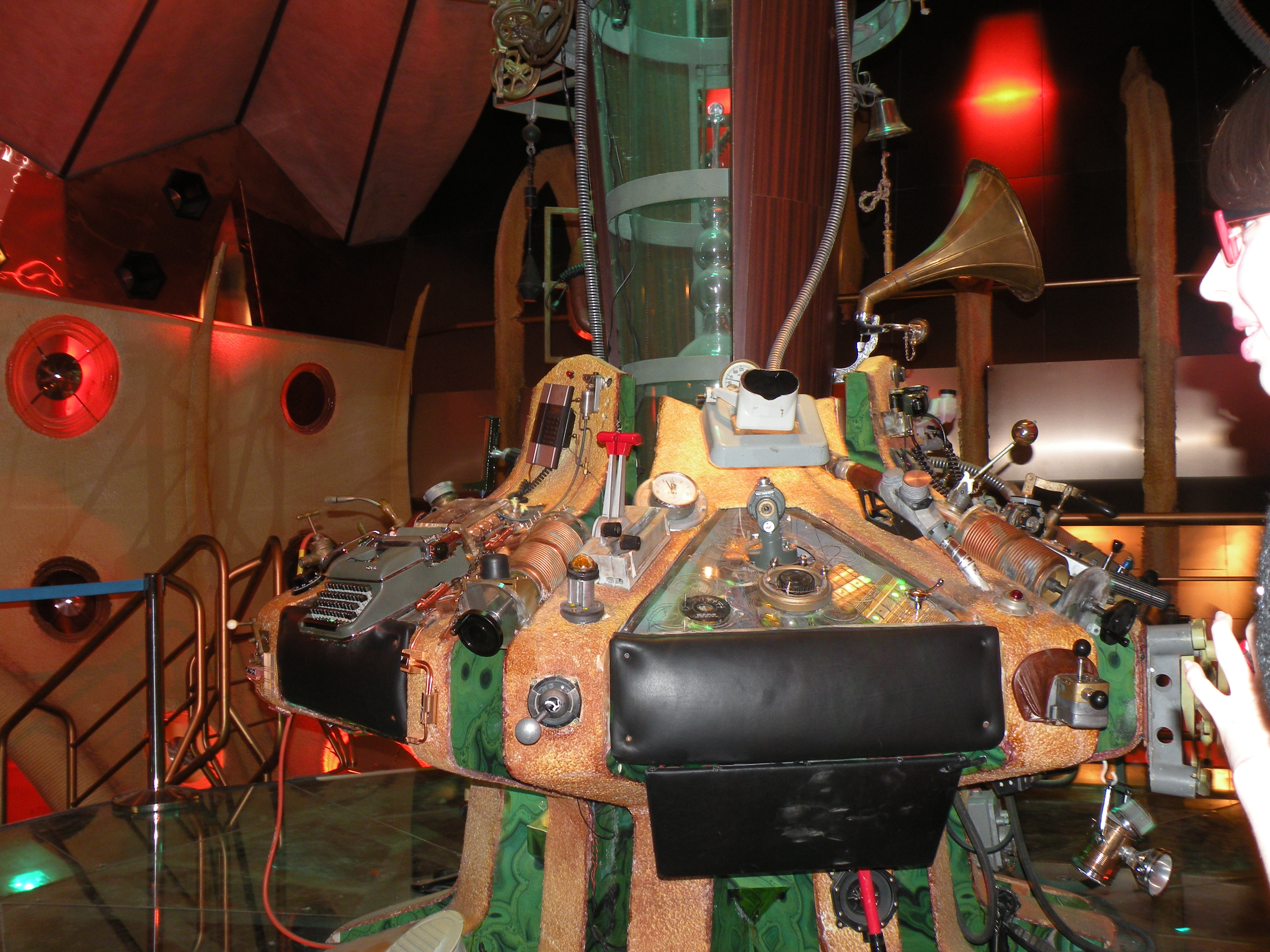
The TARDIS interior used by the Eleventh Doctor (Matt Smith) from 2010 to 2012

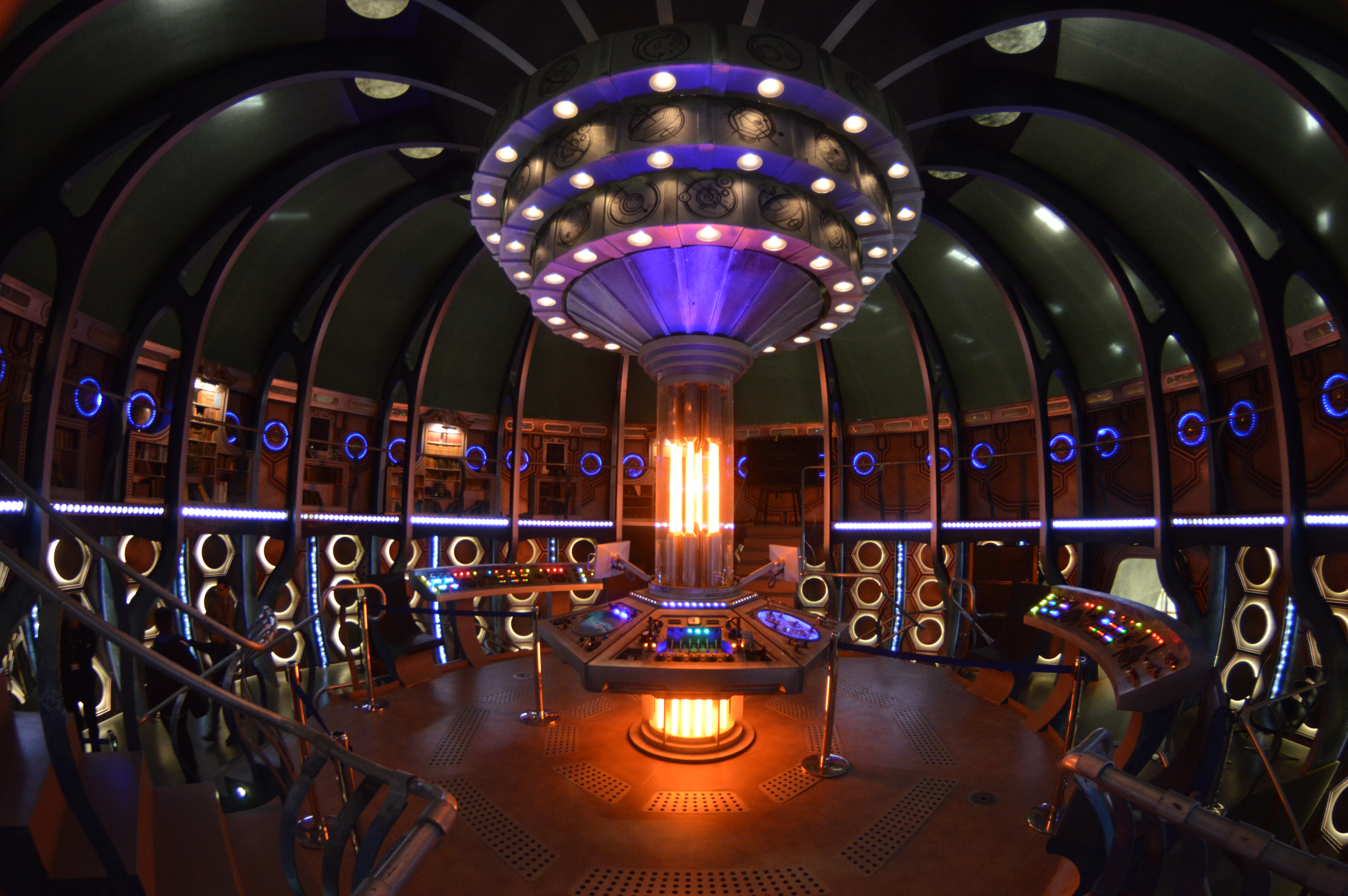
The TARDIS interior from 2012 to 2017, as it appeared during the era of the Twelfth Doctor (Peter Capaldi)

=== Depiction of time travel ===
TARDIS sound effect
Sound effect of the TARDIS dematerialising by Brian Hodgson

The production team conceived of the TARDIS travelling by dematerialising at one point and rematerialising elsewhere, although sometimes in the series it is shown also to be capable of conventional space travel. In the 2006 Christmas special, "The Runaway Bride", the Doctor remarks that for a spaceship, the TARDIS does remarkably little flying. The ability to travel simply by fading into and out of different locations became one of the trademarks of the show, allowing for a great deal of versatility in setting and storytelling without a large expense in special effects. The distinctive accompanying sound effect – a cyclic wheezing, groaning noise – was originally created in the BBC Radiophonic Workshop by sound technician Brian Hodgson by recording on tape the sound of his mother's house key scraping up and down the strings of an old piano. Hodgson then re-recorded the sound by changing the tape speed up and down and splicing the altered sounds together. When employed in the series, the sound is usually synchronised with the flashing light on top of the police box, or the fade-in and fade-out effects of a TARDIS. Writer Patrick Ness has described the ship's distinctive dematerialisation noise as "a kind of haunted grinding sound", while the Doctor Who Magazine comic strips traditionally use the onomatopoeic phrase "vworp vworp vworp".

== Other appearances ==
=== Television spin-offs ===
The sound of the Doctor's TARDIS featured in the final scene of the Torchwood episode "End of Days" (2007). As Torchwood Three's hub is situated at a rift of temporal energy, the Doctor often appears on Roald Dahl Plass directly above it in order to recharge the TARDIS. In the episode, Jack Harkness hears the tell-tale sound of the engines, smiles and afterwards is nowhere to be found; the scene picks up in the cold open of the Doctor Who episode "Utopia" (2007) in which Jack runs to and holds onto the TARDIS just before it disappears.

Former companion Sarah Jane Smith has a diagram of the TARDIS in her attic, as shown in The Sarah Jane Adventures episode "Invasion of the Bane" (2007). In the two-part serial The Temptation of Sarah Jane Smith (2008), Sarah Jane becomes trapped in 1951 and briefly mistakes an actual police public call box for the Doctor's TARDIS (the moment is even heralded by the Doctor's musical cue, frequently used in the revived series). It makes a full appearance in The Wedding of Sarah Jane Smith (2009), in which the Doctor briefly welcomes Sarah Jane's three adolescent companions into the control room. It then serves as a backdrop for the farewell scene between Sarah Jane and the Tenth Doctor, which echoed nearly word-for-word her final exchange with the Fourth Doctor aboard the TARDIS in 1976. It reappears in Death of the Doctor (2010), where it is stolen by the Shansheeth who try to use it as an immortality machine, and transports Sarah Jane, Jo Grant and their adolescent companions (Rani Chandra, Clyde Langer and Santiago Jones).

=== Theatrical films ===
The TARDIS appears in the two film productions, Dr. Who and the Daleks (1965) and Daleks' Invasion Earth 2150 A.D. (1966). In both films the Doctor, played by Peter Cushing, is an eccentric scientist who invented the TARDIS himself.

== Cultural impact ==
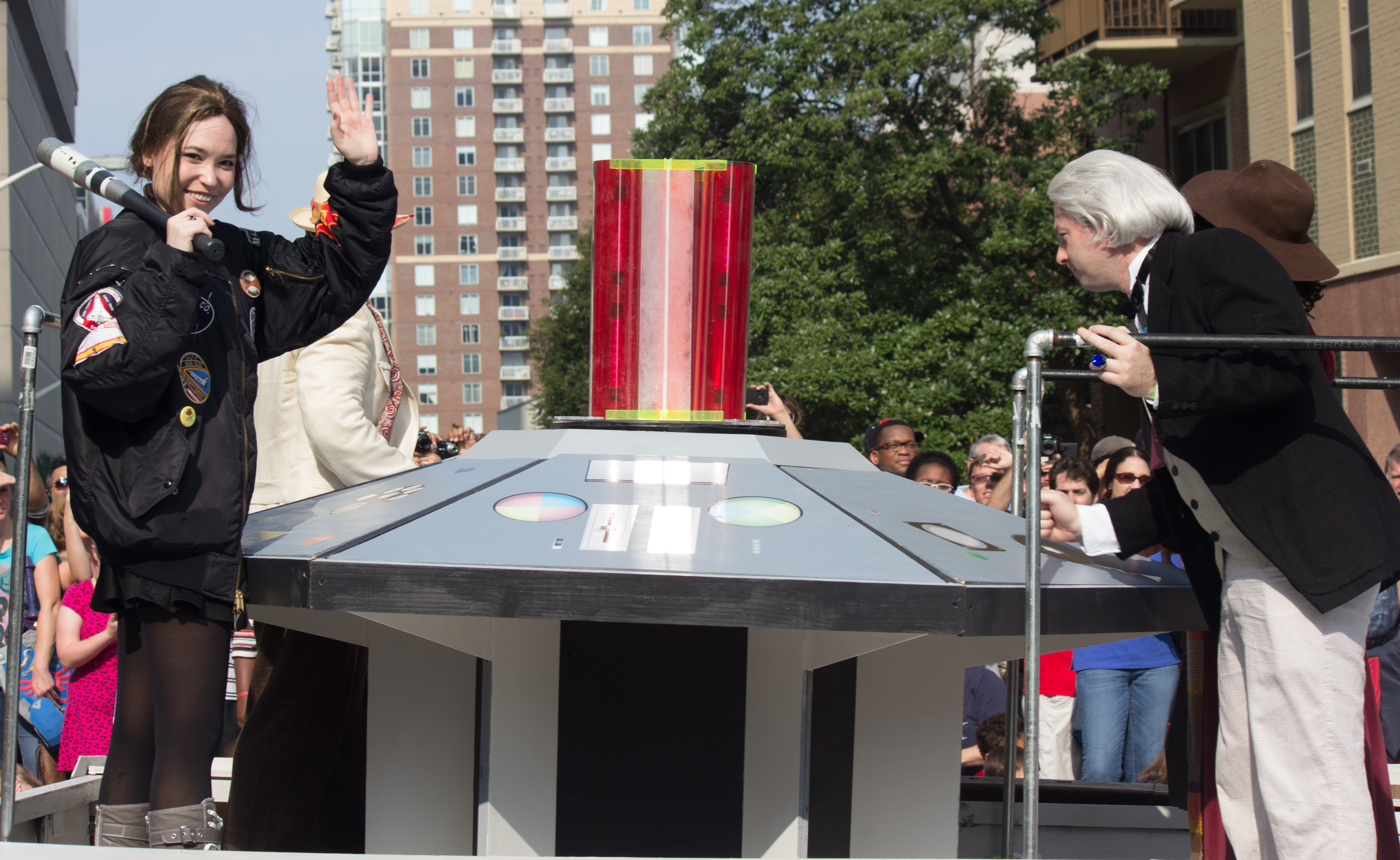
Replicas of the TARDIS set are often seen at fan cosplay events.

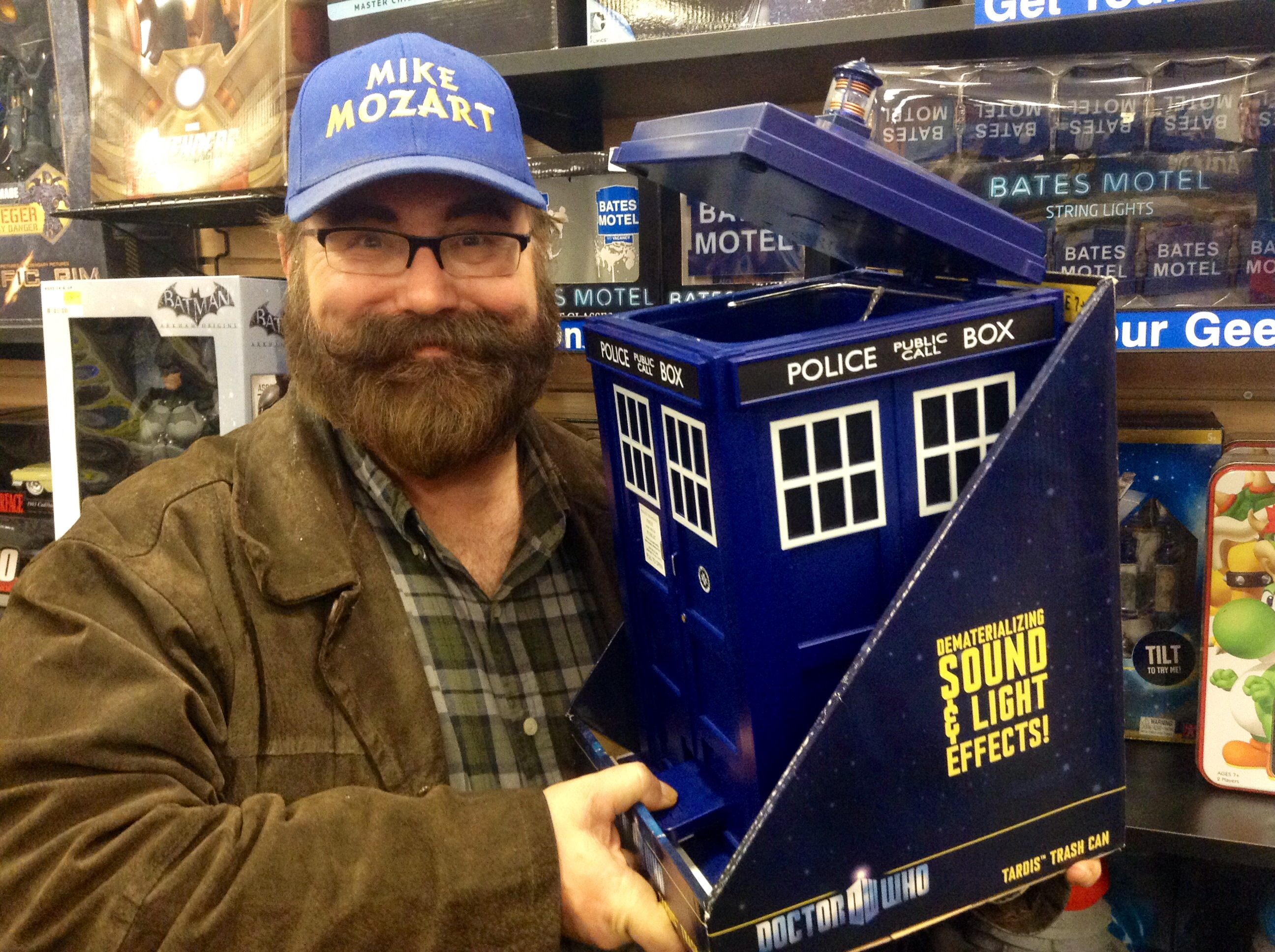
Merchandise based on the TARDIS is available, such as this pedal bin.

=== Merchandising ===
As one of the most recognisable images connected with Doctor Who, the TARDIS has appeared on numerous items of merchandise associated with the programme. TARDIS scale models of various sizes have been manufactured to accompany other Doctor Who dolls and action figures, some with sound effects included. Fan-built full-size models of the police box are also common. There have been TARDIS-shaped video games, play tents for children, toy boxes, cookie jars, book ends, key chains, and even a police-box-shaped bottle for a TARDIS bubble bath. The 1993 VHS release of The Trial of a Time Lord was contained in a special-edition tin shaped like the TARDIS.

With the 2005 series revival, a variety of TARDIS-shaped merchandise has been produced, including a TARDIS coin box, TARDIS figure toy set, a TARDIS that detects the ring signal from a mobile phone and flashes when an incoming call is detected, TARDIS-shaped wardrobes and DVD cabinets, and a USB hub in the shape of the TARDIS. The complete 2005 season DVD box set, released in November 2005, was issued in packaging that resembled the TARDIS.

One of the original-model TARDISes used in the television series' production in the 1970s was sold at auction in December 2005 for £10,800.

=== BBC trademark ===
In 1996 the BBC applied to the UK Intellectual Property Office to register the TARDIS as a trademark. This was challenged by the Metropolitan Police, who felt that they owned the rights to the police box image. However, the Patent Office found that there was no evidence that the Metropolitan Police – or any other police force – had ever registered the image as a trademark. In addition, the BBC had been selling merchandise based on the image for over three decades without complaint by the police. The Patent Office issued a ruling in favour of the BBC in 2002.

The word TARDIS is listed in the Oxford English Dictionary.

=== Legacy police boxes ===
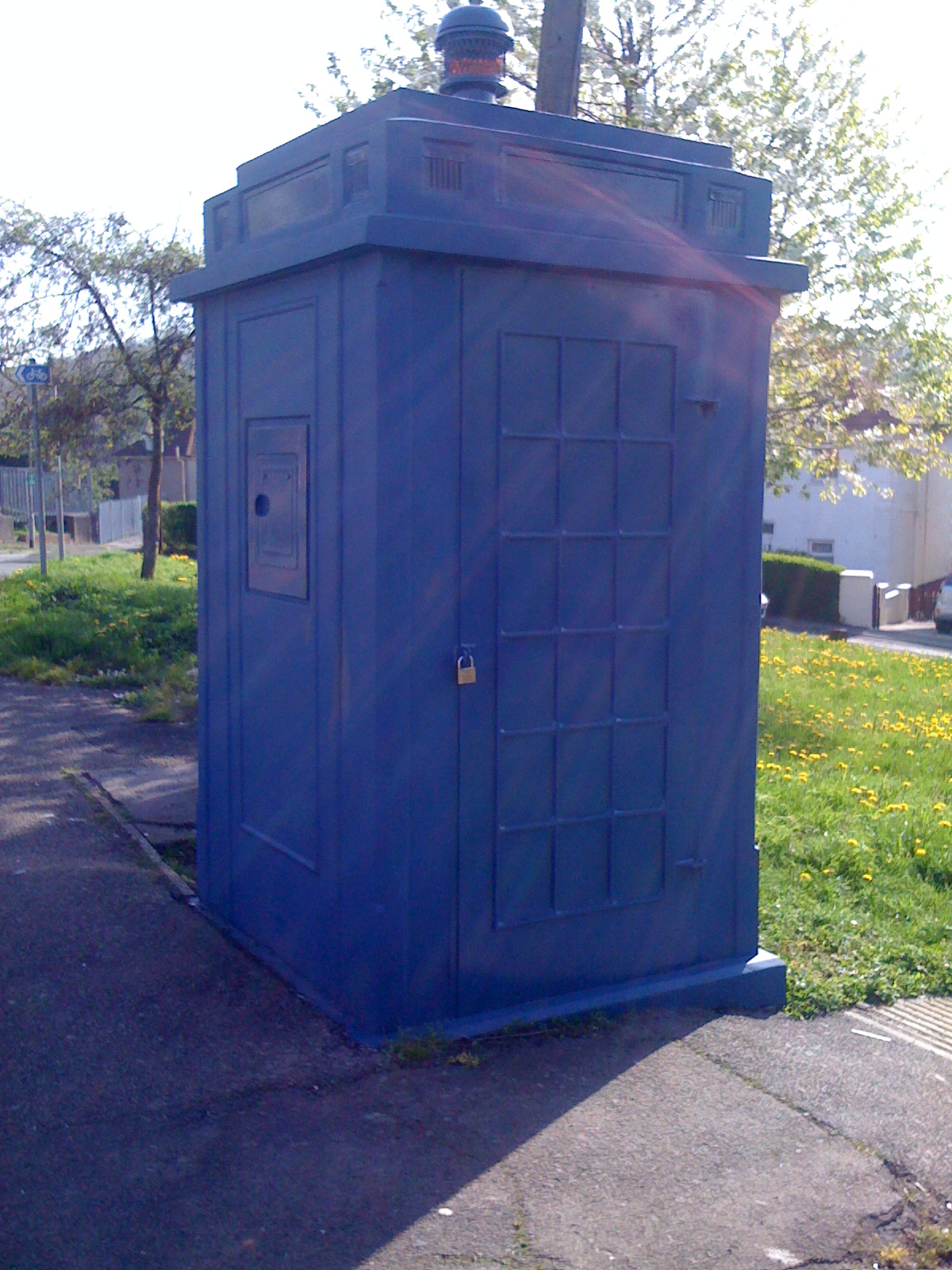
The "Somerton TARDIS", police box in Newport, Wales

A number of legacy police boxes are still standing on streets around the United Kingdom. Although now no longer used for their original function, many have been repurposed as coffee kiosks, and are often affectionately referred to as TARDISes. A police box in the Somerton area of Newport in South Wales is known as the Somerton TARDIS.

=== In science and computing ===
An asteroid discovered in 1984 by astronomer Brian A. Skiff was named 3325 TARDIS on account of its cuboid appearance. A number of geological features on Charon, the largest moon of the dwarf planet Pluto, have been named after mythological or fictional vessels, and one is named the Tardis Chasma.

A data storage manufacturer called tarDISK markets a flash memory drive for Apple MacBook which it claims is "bigger on the inside". They also claim native integration with Apple's Time Machine backup software.

The European Space Agency has sent 3,000 tardigrades ("water bears") into orbit on the outside of a rocket; 32% survived. The experiment was named Tardigrades in Space, or Tardis.

=== In popular culture ===
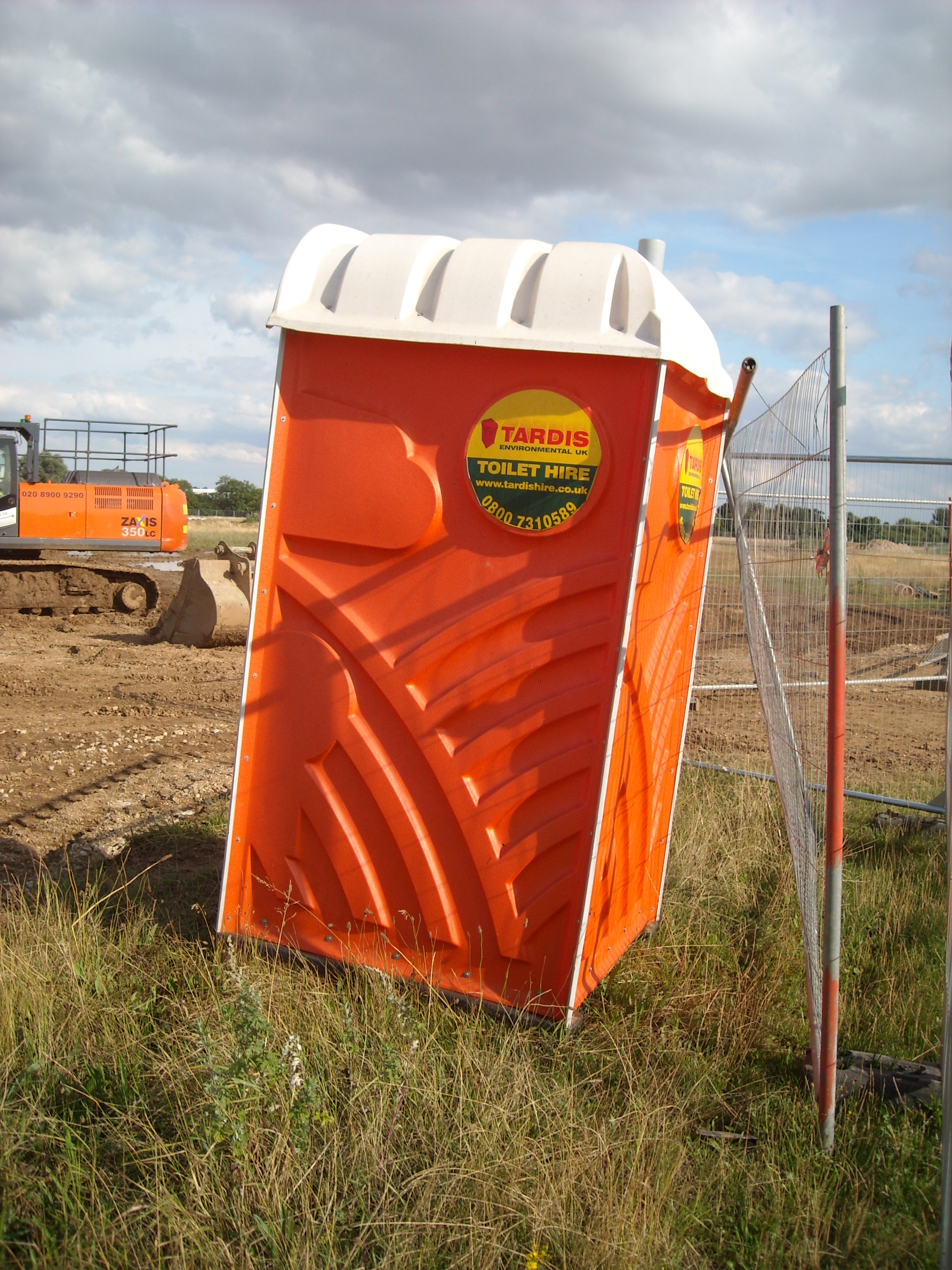
Cultural references to the TARDIS include a UK portable toilet rental company.

Cultural references to the TARDIS are many and varied.

In music, The KLF (performing as "The Timelords") released a novelty pop single in 1988 entitled "Doctorin' the Tardis". The record reached number one in the UK Singles Chart and had chart success worldwide. It was a reworking of several songs (principally Gary Glitter's "Rock and Roll Part 2", The Sweet's "Block Buster!" and the Doctor Who theme music) with lyrics referencing Doctor Who, specifically the TARDIS. In 2007, the British rock band Radiohead included the song "Up on the Ladder" on their album In Rainbows which begins with the line "I'm stuck in the TARDIS".

In 2001, Turner Prize-winning artist Mark Wallinger created a piece or artwork entitled Time and Relative Dimensions in Space that is structurally a police box shape faced with mirrors. The BBC website describes it as "recent proof of [the TARDIS'] enduring legacy".

In July 2014, the Monty Python comedy troupe opened their reunion show, Monty Python Live (Mostly), with a trademark animation featuring the Tardis – dubbed the "retardis" – flying through space before the Pythons came on stage.

In film, the TARDIS makes a cameo appearance in a number of productions, including Iron Sky (2012) and The Lego Movie 2: The Second Part (2019). The TARDIS has also featured within the gameplay of a number of popular video games, including Lego Dimensions and Fortnite Battle Royale.

To promote the Barbie film released in July 2023, a pink TARDIS was unveiled next to Tower Bridge in London on 11 July, as Ncuti Gatwa would appear in both Barbie as a Ken and in Doctor Who as the Fifteenth Doctor.

Other references to the TARDIS have included a $2 silver commemorative coin depicting the TARDIS, issued on Niue Island in the South Pacific Ocean by the Perth Mint to mark the 50th anniversary of the Doctor Who television show; and Tardis Environmental, a British sewage company, in reference to the similarity of their portable toilets to a police box.

"Tardis" has also become a slang term used in the British real estate industry, to suggest that a house or apartment is actually substantially bigger on the inside than it looks on the outside.

== See also ==
- Time travel in fiction
- Creative geography
- Portable hole
- Pocket universe
- DeLorean time machine

== Footnotes ==
Notes

Citations
