= Doctor Who: The First Adventure =

1983 video game

- Publisher: BBC Software
- Series: Doctor Who
- Platform: BBC Micro
- Release: 1983

Doctor Who: The First Adventure is a computer game based on the long-running British science fiction television series Doctor Who released for the BBC Micro in 1983. It was written by Jeremy Ruston.

The third stage, a Doctor Who themed version of Space Invaders.

It featured the Fifth Doctor, despite only seeing one pixel as The Doctor, as the player ventured through four mini-games which went by levels of completion which were Doctor Who themed versions of Pac-Man, Frogger, Space Invaders and Battleship. The first level called "Labyrinth of Death" was based on Pac-Man. Level 2, "The Prison" was a Frogger type game. The third level, "Terrordactyls" was a shooting game. The final level, "Box" was a variant on Battleships featuring hidden aliens as the targets. The player was given 15 lives, called regenerations, and 60 minutes to complete the game. This was the first officially licensed Doctor Who game; however, several unofficial Doctor Who games had been released previously such as Time Lords by Red Shift.
