= Top Trumps: Doctor Who =

2008 video game

- PlayStation 2 cover art
- Developers: Team 3 Games (PC, PlayStation 2, Nintendo Wii); Rockpool Games (Nintendo DS, J2ME)
- Publisher: Eidos Interactive
- Series: Doctor Who
- Platforms: Java ME, Nintendo DS, PlayStation 2, Windows, Wii
- Release: PlayStation 2, Nintendo DS, Microsoft Windows: EU: May 16, 2008; AU: May 23, 2008; Wii: EU: December 5, 2008
- Genre: Card game
- Modes: Single-player, multiplayer

Top Trumps: Doctor Who is a 2008 card game video game for the Nintendo DS, Nintendo Wii, Windows and PlayStation 2 consoles. The game is based on the popular Top Trumps card game and features elements from the BBC television series Doctor Who. It was published by Eidos Interactive. It is the first Doctor Who video game since 1997's Destiny of the Doctors.

The game is set in the Doctor Who universe and features characters from the Tenth Doctor and Ninth Doctor's adventures including the Tenth Doctor, Martha Jones, Capt Jack Harkness, Dalek, Cyberman and Slitheen from series 1 to series 3 of the new series in the animation style of the animated stories "The Infinite Quest" and "Scream of the Shalka".

A version was released for the Wii on 5 December 2008 in the UK.

== Gameplay ==
Players each receive a deck of cards and attempt to win all of their opponent's cards. Each card features characters or events from the Doctor Who universe and has statistics which define its strengths and weaknesses. Players choose which of these statistics will be higher than their opponent's card, the winner keeps both cards and play continues.

The game features two modes: adventure mode, where the player competes against AI controlled opponents, and a versus mode where two players go head-to-head.

== Reception ==
The DS version of the game currently holds a 53 percent rating from Metacritic based on 6 reviews. Eurogamer gave it a 7/10 rating, saying it was nicely done with enough data to please fans of the TV show while having not mucked about with the classic Top Trumps gameplay. Pocket Gamer also awarded the game 3.5/5 stars, saying it was "simple but engrossing, even for those who aren't avid followers of the Timelord's adventures."

Reception

Aggregate scores
Aggregator	Score		
Aggregator	DS	PC	PS2
GameRankings	60%	40%	47%
Metacritic	53/100		

Review scores
Publication	Score		
Publication	DS	PC	PS2
Eurogamer	7/10		
PlayStation Official Magazine – UK			5/10
Pocket Gamer	3.5/5		
VideoGamer.com	8/10		
