= Cyberman =

Fictional race of cyborgs from Doctor Who

Cybermen
- Doctor Who race
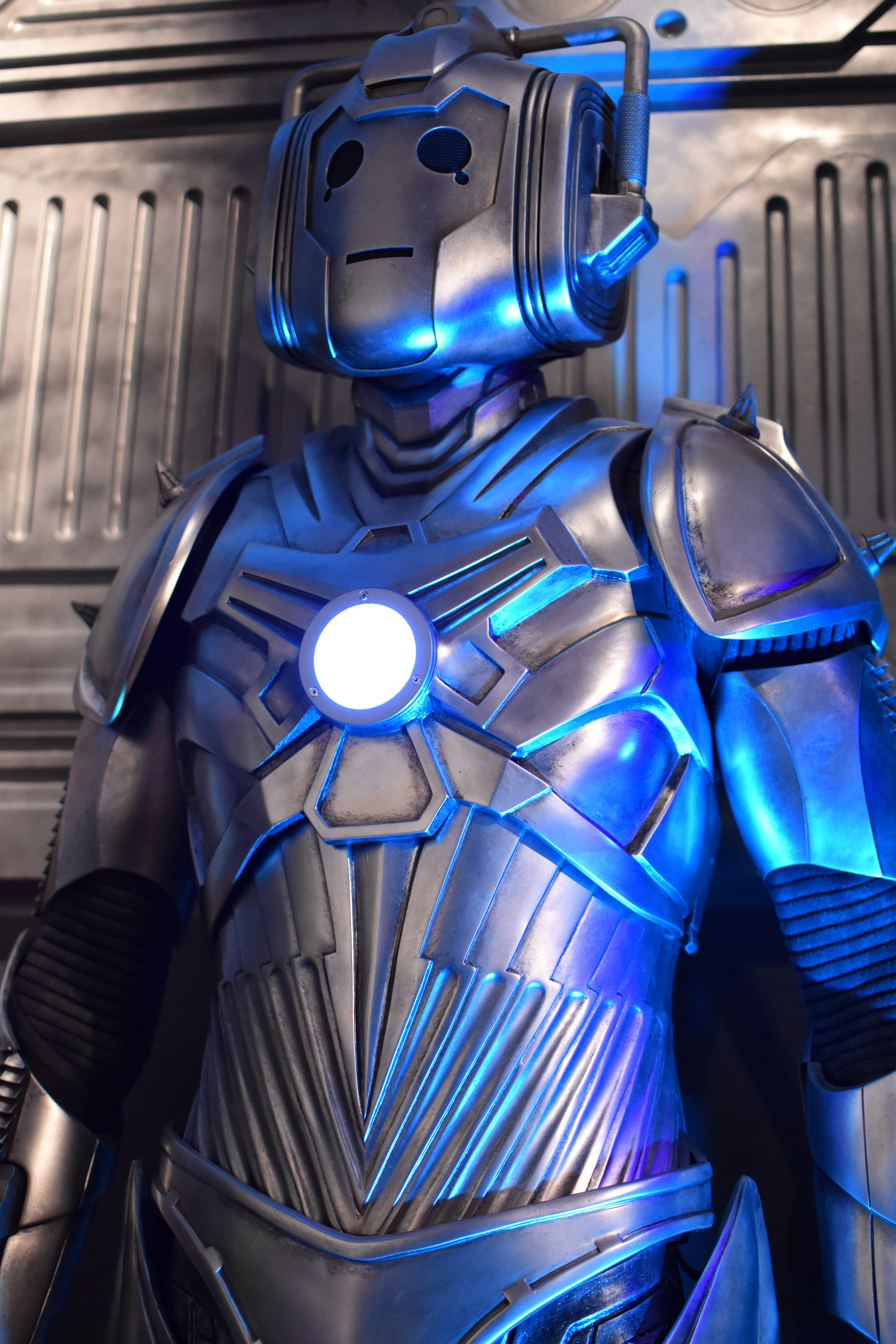
- A Cyber-Warrior, a Cyberman of the 2020 redesign
- First appearance: The Tenth Planet (1966)
- Created by: Kit Pedler; Gerry Davis

In-universe information
- Home world: Mondas; Telos (adopted); Planet 14; Marinus; Parallel Earth; Gallifrey
- Type: Cyborgs
- Notable members: Kroton; Lisa Hallett; Danny Pink; Bill Potts

The Cybermen are a fictional race of cyborgs principally portrayed in the British science fiction television programme Doctor Who. The Cybermen are a species of space-faring cyborgs who often forcefully and painfully convert human beings (or other similar species) into more Cybermen in order to populate their ranks while also removing their emotions and personalities. They were conceived by writer Kit Pedler (who was also the unofficial scientific advisor to the series) and story editor Gerry Davis, and first appeared in the 1966 Doctor Who serial The Tenth Planet.

The Cybermen have seen many redesigns and costume changes over Doctor Who's long run, as well as a number of varying origin stories. In their first appearance, The Tenth Planet (1966), they are humans from Earth's nearly identical "twin planet" of Mondas who upgraded themselves into cyborgs in a bid for self-preservation. Forty years later, the two-part story, "Rise of the Cybermen" and "The Age of Steel" (2006), depicted Cybermen invented again in a parallel universe London as a business corporation's attempt at upgrading humanity. Doctor Who audio dramas, novels, and comic books have also elaborated on existing origin stories or presented alternatives. The 2017 episode, "The Doctor Falls", explains the different origins as parallel evolution, due to the inevitability of humans and human-like species upgrading themselves through technology; this perspective resolves continuity differences in the Cybermen's history.

A mainstay of Doctor Who since the 1960s, the Cybermen have also appeared in related programmes and spin-off media, including novels, audiobooks, comic books, and video games. Cybermen stories were produced in officially licensed Doctor Who products between 1989 and 2005, when the TV show was off the air, with writers either filling historical gaps or depicting new encounters between them and the Doctor. The species also appeared in the Doctor Who TV spin-off, Torchwood, appearing in the fourth episode, "Cyberwoman" (2006).

== Creation ==
The name "Cyberman" comes from cybernetics, a term used in Norbert Wiener's book Cybernetics or Control and Communication in the Animal and the Machine (MIT Press, 1948). Wiener used the term in reference to the control of complex systems, particularly self-regulating control systems, in the animal world and in mechanical networks. By 1960, doctors were researching surgical or mechanical augmentation of humans and animals to operate machinery in space, leading to the portmanteau "cyborg", for "cybernetic organism".

In the 1960s, "spare-part" surgery began with the development of gigantic heart-lung machines. Public discussion included the possibility of wiring amputees' nerve endings directly into machines. In 1963, Kit Pedler discussed with his wife (who was also a doctor) what would happen if a person had so many prostheses that they could no longer distinguish themselves between man and machine. He got the opportunity to develop this idea when, in 1966, after an appearance on the BBC science programmes Tomorrow's World and Horizon, the BBC hired him to consult on the Doctor Who serial The War Machines (1966). That eventually led to him writing, with Gerry Davis, The Tenth Planet (1966) for Doctor Who.

Pedler, influenced by the logic-driven Treens from the Dan Dare comic strip, originally envisaged the Cybermen as "space monks", but was persuaded by Davis to concentrate on his fears about the direction of spare-part surgery. The Cybermen were originally imagined as human but with plastic and metal prostheses. The Cybermen of The Tenth Planet still have human hands, and their facial structures are visible beneath the masks they wear, but over time they evolved into metallic, more fully mechanized designs.

A variety of specialized forms of Cybermen have been shown, in particular Cyber Leaders and Cyber Controllers, with power to command other Cybermen.

== Appearances ==
=== Television ===
==== Classic series (1963–1996) ====
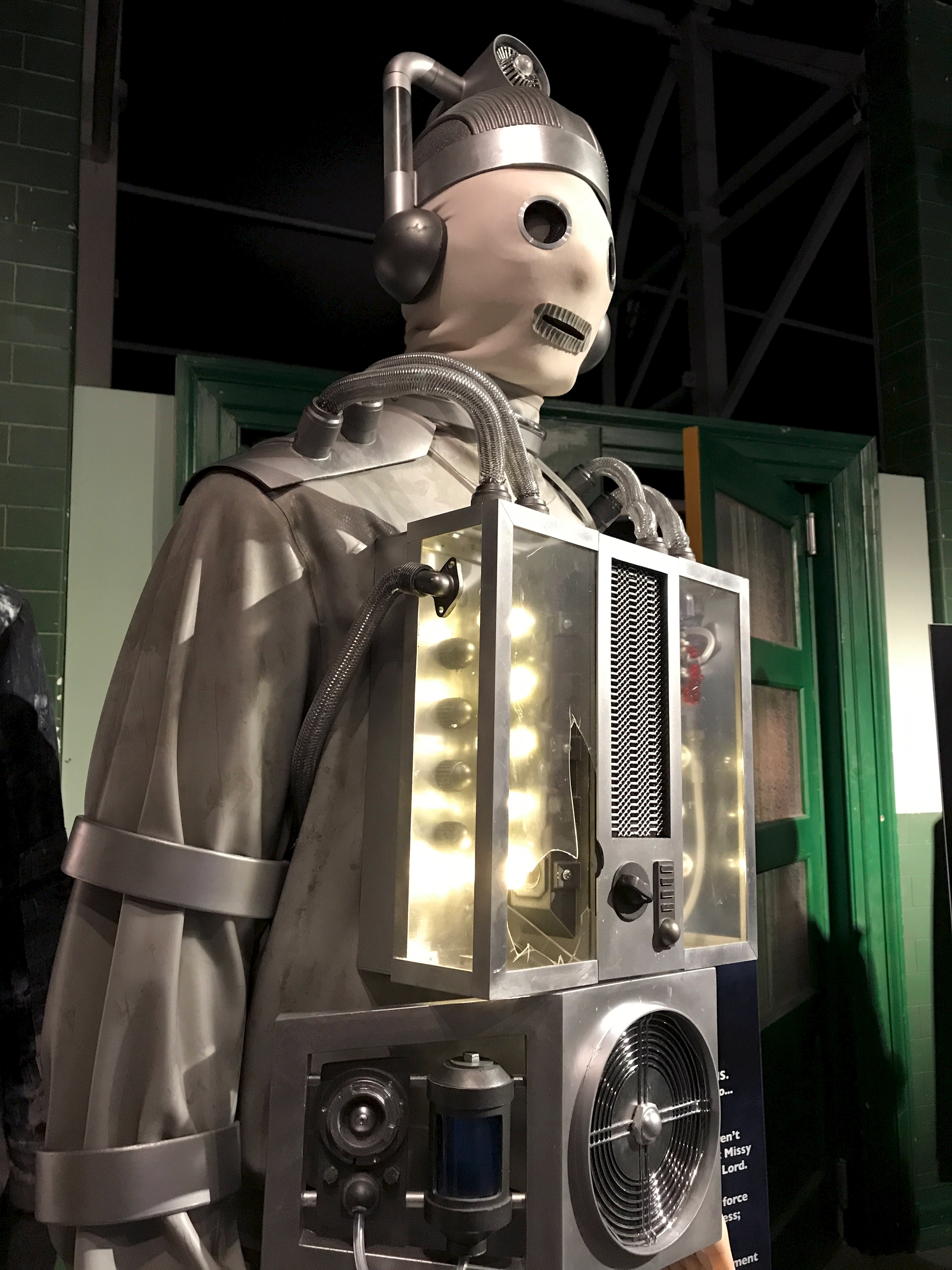
A "primitive" Mondasian Cyberman, on display at a Doctor Who exhibition

The Cybermen first appear in the serial The Tenth Planet in 1966, set in 1986. This story explains how, millions of years ago, Earth had a twin planet known as Mondas that was knocked out of solar orbit and drifted into deep space. The Mondasians, already far in advance of Earth's technology and fearful for their race's survival, replaced most of their bodies with cybernetic parts. Having eventually removed all emotion from their brains (to maintain their sanity), the natives installed a drive propulsion system to pilot the planet itself through space. As the original race was limited in numbers and were continually being depleted, the Mondasians – now Cybermen – became a race of conquerors who reproduced by forcibly changing other organic beings into Cybermen. The First Doctor (William Hartnell) opposes these Cybermen when they attempt to drain the Earth's energy to make way for Mondas' return to the Solar System; in this encounter, Mondas absorbs too much energy from Earth, destroying it and all Cybermen on Earth. The adventure takes its physical toll on the Doctor, forcing him to regenerate for the first time, becoming the Second Doctor (Patrick Troughton).

The Cybermen next appeared later in the same television season in The Moonbase (1967) opposite the Second Doctor. In 2070, the Cybermen attempt to remotely destroy the Earth by affecting its weather patterns with a device called the Gravitron. However, the Gravitron is used against them, hurling them into space. In the following season, The Tomb of the Cybermen saw a 25th Century human expedition discover sarcophagi containing hibernating Cybermen on the planet Telos, where the creatures arise and attack. This episode introduced the cybermats, small mechanical scouts used by the Cybermen, as well as the Cyber Controller. In The Wheel in Space (1968), the Doctor and his crew face off against the Cybermen on a marooned Earth space station in the 21st century. This episode introduces the Cyber-Planner, an immobile unit which directs the Cybermen. The Cybermen plan to take over the space station, after which their fleet will invade Earth. The Doctor uses an x-ray laser to destroy the Cybermen. In the next season, The Invasion has the Doctor and his companions visit late 20th century England, where he discovers an army of Cybermen are hidden on Earth and working with magnate Tobias Vaughn (Kevin Stoney) to invade Earth. Their invasion is defeated by the Doctor and the military support of the newly formed United Nations Intelligence Taskforce.

The Cybermen did not face the Third Doctor (Jon Pertwee) during his era, but one is shown as part of an exhibit in Carnival of Monsters (1973). The Third Doctor would however face Cybermen in the 20th anniversary special "The Five Doctors" (1983).

The Fourth Doctor (Tom Baker) is next to encounter a group of Cybermen in Revenge of the Cybermen (1975). These Cybermen are depicted as the wandering remnants of a fallen empire, ravaged by the so-called Cyber-Wars against victorious humanity, which had exploited the Cybermen's weakness to gold. These Cybermen attempt to restore the glory of their race by destroying the gold-rich asteroid Voga.

Cybermen were not seen again until Earthshock (1982), in which the Fifth Doctor (Peter Davison) encounters Cybermen in Earth in the year 2526. The Cybermen plan to destroy the planet with a large bomb while alien dignitaries visit Earth to discuss the ongoing Cyber-Wars. After the Doctor foils this plan, they decide to crash their freighter into the planet to achieve the same result. The freighter is hurled back in time, however, and the Doctor's companion, boy genius Adric (Matthew Waterhouse), is trapped on board as the freighter crashes into prehistoric Earth, killing Adric and triggering the K-T extinction event. The Cybermen appear once more in the Fifth Doctor's era, alongside the four previous Doctors, in "The Five Doctors" (1983), when they are transported to the Doctor's home planet of Gallifrey by the Time Lord President Borusa (Philip Latham).

Attack of the Cybermen (1985) is set after Tomb. The Cybermen attempt to use a time machine to avert the destruction of Mondas by causing Halley's Comet to crash into the Earth. Their plan fails and, due to the intervention of the Sixth Doctor (Colin Baker), they also lose their adopted homeworld of Telos to its original inhabitants, the Cryons.

The Cybermen appeared for a final time in the classic series in Silver Nemesis (1988), in which a fleet of Cybermen warships assemble to convert Earth into a new Mondas. A Cybermen scouting party is sent to Earth in search of the legendary Nemesis statue, a Time Lord artefact of immense power, made of the "living metal" validium. The intervention of the Seventh Doctor (Sylvester McCoy) and his companion Ace (Sophie Aldred), however, ensures that the Nemesis destroys the entire cyber-fleet instead.

Between the series' cancellation and subsequent revival, the Cybermen make one brief appearance, in the 1993 Children in Need special Dimensions in Time, as one of several enemies used by evil Time Lady the Rani (Kate O'Mara) to hunt the Doctor.

==== Revived series (2005–present) ====
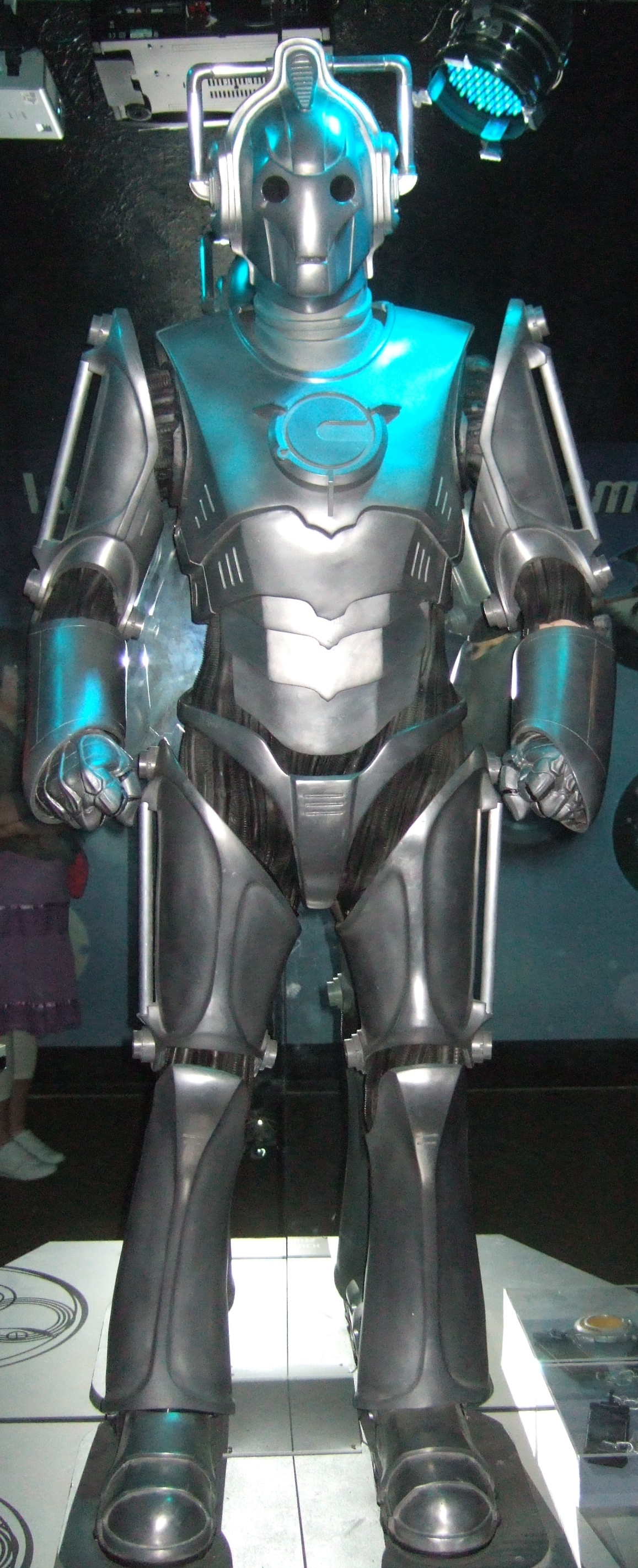
The 2006 redesign of the Cybermen

Doctor Who was revived after a long hiatus by new showrunner Russell T Davies in 2005. By then, development of CGI enabled large numbers of Cybermen or Daleks to be featured in stories. In the first series of the revived programme, the Cybermen do not appear except for the inactive head of one, which is seen in a private museum of alien artefacts on Earth in the episode "Dalek". For Series 2 in 2006, Cybermen were reintroduced with a new origin story set in a parallel universe. In the "Rise of the Cybermen" and "The Age of Steel" two-part story, the Tenth Doctor (David Tennant) and his companions, Rose Tyler (Billie Piper) and Mickey Smith (Noel Clarke), crash land in a parallel London where the Cybermen are being created on modern-day Earth. The Cybermen are created by the owner of Cybus Industries, the dying transhumanist mad scientist John Lumic (Roger Lloyd-Pack). Lumic's Cybermen successfully convert much of the world's population by placing their human brains into robotic shells. The Doctor and his friends free London from their control. A human resistance group, the Preachers, then sets about to clean up the remainder of Lumic's factories around the world. The Cybermen reappear in the 2006 two-part finale "Army of Ghosts" and "Doomsday", exploiting a breach between universes to invade the Doctor's Earth. This breach is caused by a transport device belonging to the Daleks, who reveal themselves and trigger all-out war between the two species. The Doctor ultimately re-opens the breach, causing the Cybermen and all but a few Daleks to become trapped inside before it is re-sealed. Cybermen next appear in the 2008 Doctor Who Christmas special "The Next Doctor", emerging in 1851 London after the Daleks damaged the walls of reality in the previous episode, "Journey's End". They attempt to raise a new army on Earth using period technology, but are again foiled by the Doctor.

After Steven Moffat took over the role of executive producer in 2010, Cybermen of essentially the design introduced by Davies continued to appear. No explicit reference is made to their origin, but generally the stylised 'c' (for Cybus Corporation) on their breastplate had been replaced by a plain circle, implying that they were not from the parallel universe. They appear in "The Pandorica Opens" (2010) alongside many of the Doctor's recurring enemies as part of an alliance dedicated to stopping him, arriving in cyber ships in 102 CE. They appear again in "A Good Man Goes to War" (2011), when the Eleventh Doctor's (Matt Smith) companion Rory Williams (Arthur Darvill) demands the location of a secret asteroid base in a quadrant of space which they monitor in the 52nd century. The Doctor destroys a large fleet of their spaceships to indicate their seriousness. In "Closing Time", an ancient slumbering cyber ship is awakened in 2011 Colchester, and the Doctor and his friend Craig Owens (James Corden) work together to repel a Cyberman invasion. This episode also reintroduces cybermats to the series. Neil Gaiman's episode "Nightmare in Silver" (2013) depicts the re-emergence of the Cybermen in the distant future, following what was believed to be their complete eradication by humankind. These redesigned Cybermen have discarded many of their limitations, exhibiting increased speed, rapid upgrading to overcome weaknesses, and the ability to convert any biological organism into their ranks. The Eleventh Doctor undergoes a partial cyber-conversion, and mentally duels with a Cyber-Planner for control of his body. The emperor of the galaxy (Warwick Davis) orders a planet's destruction to wipe out the Cyberman, but one intact cybermite (new, minuscule cybermat variants) is later seen floating through space. A dead Cyberman head is briefly shown in the UNIT Black Archive in "The Day of the Doctor", and in "The Time of the Doctor" they are among the many species which besiege the planet Trenzalore for centuries. In the latter episode, the Doctor also uses a disembodied Cyberman head, devoid of any remaining organic parts; named "Handles", he serves as the Doctor's personal assistant and confidant for several centuries until his eventual 'death' brings the Doctor to tears.

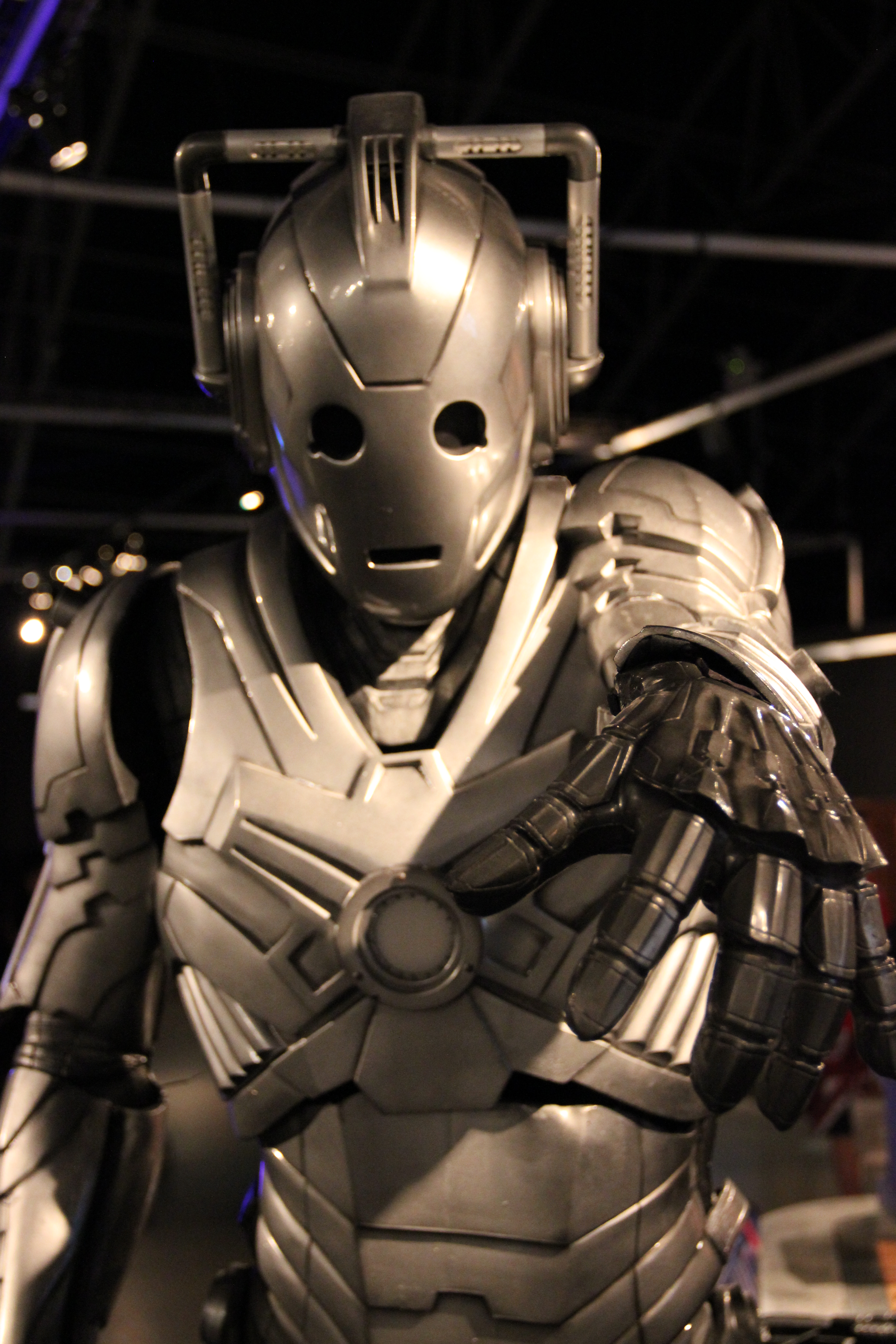
A Cyberman in its 2013 redesign

In the two-part finale of the 2014 series, "Dark Water" and "Death in Heaven", the Twelfth Doctor (Peter Capaldi) learns too late that the Cybermen have formed an alliance with a female incarnation of the Master, Missy (Michelle Gomez), who is converting the stolen bodies of the dead into an army. A cyberconversion process begins on all of Earth's dead. Missy offers the Doctor control of the Cybermen army so they can rule the universe together, but her plan is foiled when Danny Pink (Samuel Anderson), the cyber-converted boyfriend of the Doctor's companion Clara Oswald (Jenna Coleman), resists his programming and destroys himself along with all the other Cybermen. Cybermen are next seen in "Face the Raven" (2015), among the various alien refugees hiding in London, and in series finale "Hell Bent", in which a rusted Cyberman is imprisoned in the Cloisters of Gallifrey. The origin of another group of Cybermen is told in the two-part Series 10 finale "World Enough and Time" and "The Doctor Falls", when a Mondasian colony ship is stuck escaping the gravity of a black hole for many years. The human-like Mondasians, assisted unknowingly by the Master (John Simm), begin upgrading their population to adapt to life aboard the decaying ship. The Doctor reflects on all the societies that have created Cybermen and concludes that the Cybermen is an example of parallel evolution; the Cybermen will always arise and be developed on human-like species across the universe. Ultimately, this encounter with the Cybermen proves brutal: the Doctor's companion Bill Potts (Pearl Mackie) is cyberconverted; two incarnations of the Master (Simm and Gomez) kill one another in a disagreement over standing alongside the Doctor; and the Doctor's companion Nardole (Matt Lucas) is left behind on the ship to look after human colonists, for whom inevitable cyberconversion has been delayed but not averted, though the Doctor manages to destroy most of the Cybermen in a massive explosion. The Doctor, exhausted and wounded to a point of nearing death, awakens in his TARDIS and begins to regenerate. At the same time, the cyberconverted Bill is saved by her old flame Heather who turns her into the same sort of being Heather became after being infected by a sentient liquid.

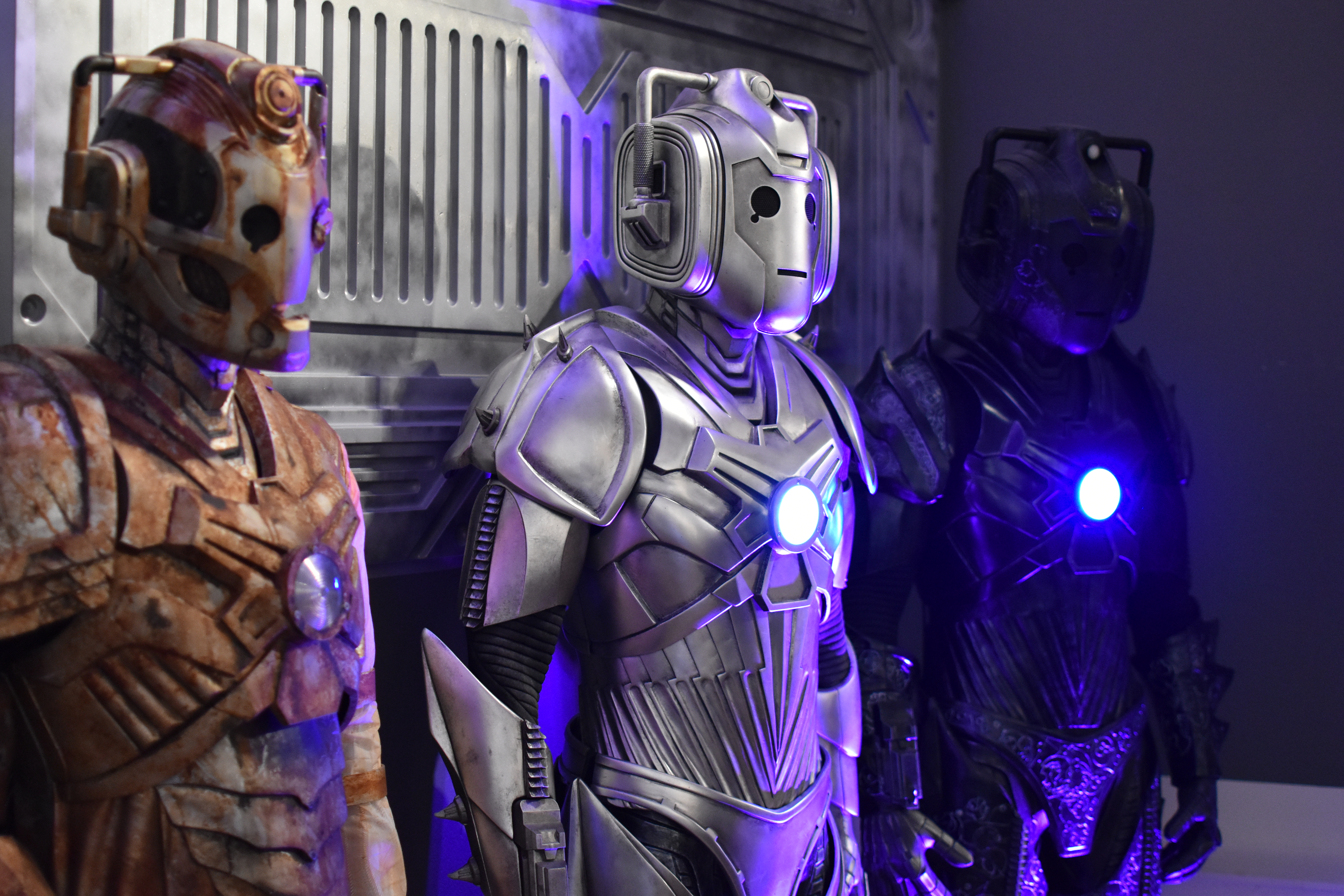
Three Cybermen from the Chris Chibnall era: Ashad, a Cyber-Warrior and a Cyber-Master, on display at the Peterborough Museum and Art Gallery

Cybermen feature heavily in Series 12 (2020). In "Fugitive of the Judoon", experienced companion Captain Jack Harkness (John Barrowman) sends a message to the Thirteenth Doctor (Jodie Whittaker): "do not give the lone Cyberman what it wants". In "The Haunting of Villa Diodati", the Doctor encounters this Cyberman, the sole survivor of the Cyber-Wars, partially-converted Ashad (Patrick O'Kane). She ignores Jack's warning and gives him the Cyberium, the total knowledge of the defeated Cyberman empire, to save human history. This leads to Ashad rejuvenating the Cyber-Empire in season finale "Ascension of the Cybermen" and "The Timeless Children", intending to end all organic life in the universe with a "Death Particle" once he transforms the Cybermen into a purely technological race. However, the Master (Sacha Dhawan) intervenes, promising an alliance only to swiftly betray Ashad, confiscating the Cyberium and converting the massacred Time Lord civilisation into "CyberMasters" – a new race of infinitely regenerating Cybermen. This army is seemingly defeated by a miniaturised version of the Death Particle. A Cyberman is later seen in the 2021 New Years Special "Revolution of the Daleks" as one of the Doctor's cellmates in a Judoon prison. The CyberMasters and a clone of Ashad return alongside the Master in a daring scheme alongside the Daleks to steal the Doctor's body in "The Power of the Doctor" (2022), narrowly defeated only when the Doctor's companions succeed in bringing her back to life.

=== Spin-offs ===
The Cybermen have appeared in various spin-off media.

==== Novels ====
The Cybermen were also featured in the novel Iceberg by actor David Banks, who played the Cyber Leader in the television series from Earthshock to Silver Nemesis. Banks had previously written, in 1988, Cybermen, a fictional history of the Cybermen which included a "future" design for them. The Missing Adventure Novel Killing Ground also features Cybermen of the type seen in Revenge of the Cybermen. During this novel, the Sixth Doctor's new companion Grant Markham returns to his home planet and learns that a group of Cybermen have hidden on it for centuries, with his robophobia being based around the repressed memory of witnessing a Cyberman kill his mother before he escaped.

In two Virgin Missing Adventures novels by Craig Hinton, the Cybermen become Cyberlords at some point in their history. They are mentioned in passing in Hinton's The Crystal Bucephalus, where the Cyberlord Hegemony is a peaceful future version of the Cybermen who have an empire in the Milky Way; their description was modelled after Banks's designs. In The Quantum Archangel, there are numerous unexplained references to the Cyberlords as an extremely advanced race. At one point, they are referred to as the Time Lords' greatest ally in the Millennium War, though because that war was supposed to have taken place a very long time before the modern era, it is unclear how this bit of Cyberhistory fits in or whether or not they have achieved advanced time travel capabilities. While not explicitly mentioned, Hinton may have adopted this idea from the aborted script for the Five Doctors by Robert Holmes (scriptwriter), which would have had the Cybermen adopting Time Lord DNA to achieve their higher state of being.

The Past Doctor Adventures novel Illegal Alien featured Cybermen and Cybermats in London during the Blitz. Cyber-technology left over from that adventure was subsequently misused in Loving the Alien, written by the same authors. The Fifth Doctor story Warmonger by Terrance Dicks has the Cybermen join the Doctor's alliance against Morbius. The First Doctor story The Time Travellers by Simon Guerrier, set in an alternate reality, has the Cybermen (who are never named) living at the South Pole and trading advanced technology to South Africa. The Eighth Doctor Adventures novel Hope by Mark Clapham features the Silverati, a group of cybernetically enhanced humans heavily reminiscent of the Cybermen, in existence in the very far future as the universe approaches its end, with some evidence suggesting that the Silverati were adapted from remnants of the Cybermen of the present.

==== Audio dramas ====
The Cybermen have appeared in several Big Finish audio plays battling the Doctor, the first of which was Sword of Orion (released on CD in 2001 and broadcast on BBC 7 in 2005), where the Eighth Doctor deals with humans and androids engaged in a war who seek Cyber-technology to improve their sides. The 2002 play Spare Parts explored aspects of the Cybermen's origin, revealing that the design was ironically only perfected after their creator, Doctorman Allan, studied the biology of the Fifth Doctor and duplicated a third lobe to the Doctor's brain that controlled his body functions. They were the villains in the company's BBCi webcast Real Time, which was released on purely audio in December 2002. The first instalment of a four-CD series titled Cyberman, which does not feature the Doctor, was released in September 2005. Sword of Orion and the Cyberman series are set around the "Great Orion Cyber-Wars" of the 26th century, when androids rebelled against humanity in the Orion System and both human and android turned to the Cybermen to gain a military advantage. In Sword of Orion, the Cybermen are still entombed on Telos and are mostly forgotten, setting it before Earthshock; by the time of Cyberman, Telos has been destroyed by an asteroid collision, placing that series after Attack of the Cybermen.

The Cybermen appeared in a linked trilogy of plays entitled The Harvest (2004), The Reaping (2006) and The Gathering (2006), where small groups of Cybermen attempt to manipulate humans into setting up conversion factories on Earth. The Bernice Summerfield play The Crystal of Cantus features a former human colony turned into Cybermen, with Irving Braxiatel planning to use them as a private army. A Cyberman tomb also appeared in the Bernice Summerfield play Silver Lining, which came free with Doctor Who Magazine #351. They appear in Human Resources, which Big Finish produced for radio BBC 7 and subsequently released on CD, and sees the Eighth Doctor averting a plan to take control of a new weapons system. The Sixth Doctor joins forces with the Second Doctor's companions Jamie and Zoe to deal with two different Cybermen assaults in Legend of the Cybermen and Last of the Cybermen; Legend sees Zoe made into the new Mistress of the Land of Fiction, bringing in the Sixth Doctor and a fictional version of Jamie to stop the Cybermen conquering the Land, and Last depicts the Sixth swapping places with the Second just as the younger Doctor discovers a Cybermen plot to alter the outcome of the last battle of the Cyber-Wars. In the Fourth Doctor Adventures audio The Fate of Krelos/Return to Telos, the Fourth Doctor, Leela and K9 discover that the Cybermen planted nanobots on Jamie during their past trip to Telos that allow the Cybermen to infect K9 and subsequently use the TARDIS to take over the machinery of the planet Krelos, but the Doctor is able to use a robot drone to go back to his original trip to Telos and prevent Jamie being exposed to the nanites, undoing these events.

In March 2018, the Cybermen had their first encounter with the Third Doctor (this time played by Tim Treloar) in The Tyrants of Logic, one of the stories in Volume 4 of Big Finish's The Third Doctor Adventures series. In the story, the Doctor and companion Jo Grant (Katy Manning) arrive in the town of Port Anvil on the planet Burnt Salt. They come across a mysterious crate, which the Cybermen set about to reclaim as it contains the "Cyber Leveler," a type of tactician similar to the Cyber Controller. In the ensuing adventure, the Doctor is exposed to "Cyber Smoke," a poisonous gas that prepares a body for cyber conversion. The Doctor is able to fight off the infection for a time, and develop a cure, which he then uses against the Cybermen, defeating them. The Cybermen battle the Third Doctor and Sarah Jane Smith in the Audio Novel Scourge of the Cybermen. David Banks reprised his role as the Cyber-Leader in Hour of the Cybermen, against the Sixth Doctor and UNIT, and Conversion, which served as a follow-up to Earthshock.

==== Comics ====
They have also appeared in the various Doctor Who comic strips, beginning with The Coming of the Cybermen in TV Comic #824-#827. TV Comic cashed in on their frequent presence in the TV series in the late 1960s by featuring them regularly, and they appeared in Flower Power (TVC #832-#835), Cyber-Mole (TVC #842-#845), The Cyber Empire (TVC #850-#853), Eskimo Joe (TVC #903-#906), Masquerade (TVC Holiday Special 1968), The Time Museum (TVC Annual 1969), The Champion (TVC Holiday Special 1969) and Test-Flight (TVC Annual 1970). Their absence from the TV show for most of the 1970s was reflected in a lack of appearances in the strip: they eventually returned in the early 1980s in the Doctor Who Monthly strip Junk-Yard Demon (DWM #58-#59). They made further appearances after the publication was re-titled Doctor Who Magazine: Exodus/Revelation/Genesis (DWM #108-#110), The World Shapers (DWM #127-#129, written by Grant Morrison, which revealed that the Voord were the race that evolved into the Cybermen and that Mondas was previously the planet Marinus), The Good Soldier (DWM #175-#178) and The Flood (DWM #346-#353). In addition, a Cyberman named Kroton, who originally appeared in a couple of Doctor Who Weekly back-up strips called Throwback: The Soul of a Cyberman (DWW #5-#7) and Ship of Fools (DWW #23-#24), was reintroduced in Unnatural Born Killers (DWM #277) and was briefly a companion of the Eighth Doctor in The Company of Thieves (DWM #284-#286) and The Glorious Dead (DWM #287-#296). The Cybermen had their own one-page strip in DWM from issues #215-#238, written by Alan Barnes and drawn by Adrian Salmon.

In 1996, the Radio Times published a Doctor Who comic strip. The first story, entitled Dreadnought, featured the Cybermen attacking a human starship in 2220 and introduced the strip companion Stacy Townsend.

In 2006/2007, the Trading Cards magazine Doctor Who - Battles in Time issues 8 - 11 ran a sixteen-page comic strip consisting of four linked stories featuring the Cybermen, written by Steve Cole, drawn by Lee Sullivan and coloured by Alan Craddock.

In the Doctor Who/Star Trek crossover, Assimilation2, the Cybermen join forces with the Borg, forcing the Eleventh Doctor to join forces with the crew of the Enterprise-D to stop them. The Borg and Cybermen have begun to attack and convert worlds without warning, with the apparent 'leader' being a Cyber-Controller with Borg components. The Doctor also recalls a past incident where he helped the crew of the original Enterprise defeat a Cyberman infiltration of a Federation outpost in his fourth incarnation, although it would appear that this is a recent addition to his history as the Eleventh Doctor also remembers not remembering that encounter. The Cybermen attempt to subvert and take over the Borg Collective, forcing the Doctor and the Enterprise to ally with the Borg to stop the Cybermen and restore the Collective to normal.

The Cybermen also feature in the Titan Comics 2016 multi-Doctor event story Supremacy of the Cybermen, which depicts the last Cybermen at the end of the universe forming an alliance with Rassilon- after he was exiled from Gallifrey by the Twelfth Doctor in "Hell Bent"- with the goal of conquering Gallifrey and using Time Lord energy to regenerate the universe into one under Cyber-control. Although Rassilon's insight allows the Cybermen to conquer history and defeat all of the past Doctors, the Twelfth Doctor is able to convince Rassilon to help him after the Cybermen betray Rassilon, the two turning the Cybermens' equipment against them so that the universe is 'regenerated' to a point before the Cybermen conquered Gallifrey, with only the Twelfth Doctor (and possibly Rassilon) remembering these events.

==== Video games ====
The 2010 video game Blood of the Cybermen features Cybermen of the 2006 design without the Cybus Industries chest plate. These Cybermen are unearthed in the Arctic in 2010; their ship is said to have been damaged by a time-storm and crashed 10,000 years earlier. The player plays as the Eleventh Doctor and his companion Amy, who work to defeat the Cybermen. They also appear on Telos in both the android games Doctor Who: The Mazes of Time and Doctor Who and the Dalek.

The Cybermen appear as enemies in Lego Dimensions, and one was added as a playable character in Wave 3.

== Physical characteristics ==
While the Doctor's archenemy, the Daleks, were on the whole unchanged during the original series's 26-season run, the Cybermen were seen to change with almost every encounter. The Cybermen are humanoid, but have been altered until they have few remaining organic parts. They retain living human brains. In their first appearance in the series, the only parts of their bodies that still seemed human were their hands; by their next appearance in The Moonbase (1967), their bodies were entirely covered in their metallic suits, with their hands replaced by three finger claws, but they changed back to regular five-fingered hands in The Invasion (1968). As they are relatively few, the Cybermen tend towards covert activity, scheming from hiding and using human pawns or robots to act in their place until they need to appear. They also seek to increase their numbers by converting others into Cybermen (a process known as "cyber-conversion" or "Cybernisation" in the older episodes and "upgrading" in the newer episodes), an often painful process as body parts are removed and replaced with cybernetic replacements.

It is implied that there are still organic components beneath their suits, meaning they are cyborgs, not robots: in The Tenth Planet, a Cyberman tells a group of humans that "our brains are just like yours", although by the time of Attack of the Cybermen (1985), their brains seem to have been replaced with electronics. Also in this story, two human slave-prisoners of the Cybermen on the planet Telos, named Bates and Stratton, reveal that their organic arms and legs have been removed by the Cybermen and replaced by cyber-substitutes. In Earthshock (1982), the actors' chins were vaguely visible through a clear perspex area on the helmet to suggest some kind of organic matter. In The Tomb of the Cybermen (1967), veins and brains were visible through the domed head of the Cyber-Controller, and similarly, in Attack of the Cybermen (1985) and "The Age of Steel" (2006), the Cyber-Controller's brain is visible through the dome. The first is a Mondas Cyber Controller, and the second involves alternative Earth's John Lumic. However, in Revenge of the Cybermen (1975), the Doctor says they are "total machine creatures".

The audio play Real Time implies that the converted victim's face remains beneath the Cyberman faceplate, although the audio plays, like all non-televised spin-off media, are of uncertain canonicity with regard to the television series. In the 2014's "Death in Heaven", Danny Pink removes the faceplate showing his face underneath. The Virgin New Adventures novel Iceberg by David Banks states that some Cybermen experience rare flashes of emotional memory from the time before they were converted; these flashes are then usually suppressed. The Cybermen in the revived series are usually constructed from human brains bonded to a Cyberman exoskeletal shell with an artificially-grown nervous system threaded throughout ("The Age of Steel"), although direct grafting of cyber-components is another method of conversion ("Cyberwoman"). In "The Pandorica Opens", a Cyberman head is shown to open up, revealing an entire human skull, not just the brain.

Although the Cybermen often claim that they have done away with human emotion, they have exhibited emotions ranging from anger to smug satisfaction in their confrontations with the Doctor. Some Cybermen in the early stories were even given individual names such as "Krang" (however these names only appeared in the cast listings for "The Tenth Planet" and were not spoken on-screen). Some parallel Earth Cybermen did retain some memories of their pre-conversion lives, although their emotional response varied. In "Cyberwoman", the partial conversion led to a degree of insanity in Lisa Hallett, which was retained even after she transferred her brain into a fully human body. In "Doomsday", Yvonne Hartman retains at least some elements of her personality (including her voice being heard over the usual Cyberman voice) to prevent the advance of a group of other Cybermen, and is last seen weeping what appears to be either an oil-like substance or blood. In the same episode, the Cyber-Leader expresses clear frustration at the humans' refusal to surrender, although in a later scene he criticises the Doctor for showing emotion. In "The Age of Steel", the Doctor defeats the Cybermen by shutting down their emotional inhibitors, enabling them to "see" what had become of them. Their realisation of what they had become led them to either simply shut down out of sheer horror, or partially explode. Lastly, when the first Cyber Leader is killed, his head explodes with some white liquid leaking down his body; there are references in that episode to a patented Cybus Industries mixture of chemicals used to preserve the brain. In "Death in Heaven", Danny Pink also retains some of his personality traits, including shock at seeing his reflection and what he's become, but also his love for Clara Oswald. The Doctor turns it on to gain intelligence and reveal that the Cybermen have developed a way to cyber-convert dead human remains. Only then does the Doctor exploit Danny's keeping of his personality traits, even under the inhibitor, to command the Cyber-Army. In "The Doctor Falls", the Doctor's companion Bill retains her complete sense of self and identity, even to the point of not initially seeing herself as a Cyberman, as a result of her experiences resisting mind control and telepathic suggestions in a past adventure. However, Cyberman program does manifest in her bursts of anger and she says her mind cannot hold on forever.

The Virgin Missing Adventures novel Killing Ground, by Steve Lyons suggests that some Cybermen imitate emotions to intimidate and unnerve their victims. The Big Finish Productions audio play Spare Parts (set on Mondas in the early days of Cyber-conversion) suggests that the Cybermen deliberately remove their emotions as part of the conversion process to stifle the physical and emotional trauma of becoming a Cyberman.

This motive behind the removal of emotions is made more explicit in "The Age of Steel", where it is done by an emotional inhibitor. In that episode, deactivating their emotional inhibitors causes the converted Cybermen to realise what they have become, driving them insane and killing them.

=== Weaknesses ===
The Cybermen have had a number of weaknesses since their introduction. The most notable weakness of the original Cybermen is the element gold. Their aversion to gold was not mentioned until they try to destroy the planetoid Voga (the so-called "Planet of Gold") in Revenge of the Cybermen (1975). Initially, it was explained that, due to its non-corrodible nature, gold essentially chokes their respiratory systems. For example, the glittergun, a weapon used during the Cyber-Wars in the future, fired gold dust at its targets. However, in later serials, gold appeared to affect them rather as silver affects werewolves, with gold coins or gold-tipped bullets fired at them having the same effect. The revived series's Cybermen have no such weakness, though the tie-in website for the episode mentions it. Cybermen are also efficiently killed when shot with their own guns, or by a Dalek. Other weaknesses from early stories include solvents, gravity based technology, and excessive levels of radiation. In "The Age of Steel", an EMP grenade is shown to disable a Cyberman and shut down its emotional inhibitor. The vulnerability to gold is clearly not present in some early Cyberman types, for example the type seen in the 1968 serial The Invasion were unlikely to possess it, or perhaps more likely the weakness is not known, otherwise the Doctor/UNIT would simply have used it and not needed the elaborate plan involving the assistance of a Russian missile base and the Cybermen's puppet ally, Tobias Vaughn. In "Nightmare in Silver", the Doctor uses gold to slow down though not destroy some circuitry of technologically advanced Cybermen in the distant future. It is unclear precisely how many of the different types, and which types, of Cyberman are vulnerable to gold.

Their armour is often depicted as flexible and resistant to bullets, but can be penetrated by gold arrows and projectiles made of gold. The Cybus Cybermen are bullet-proof and are very resilient, but are not indestructible – they are vulnerable to high explosives, electromagnetic pulses, specialised weaponry and Dalek energy weapons.

In "The Power of the Doctor" (2022), Tegan Jovanka and Ace fire gold bullets at a group of Cybermen only to be told that they have evolved beyond weakness to gold.

=== Costumes ===
For The Tenth Planet, the original Cyberman costumes, including the "handle" shapes on their heads, were designed by Sandra Reid. The masks and one-piece bodystockings were made from jersey fabric, with holes trimmed with vinyl where the Cybermen "eyes" and "mouths" were; the actors' features were darkened to hide their faces. The fabric of the costumes were coloured a faint blue so they could show up on black and white television cameras. Over the top of the stockings, the Cybermen wore polythene suits ribbed with metal wings, along with epaulettes made of metal, and plastic piping. Their boots were short Wellington boots, painted silver. In a 2016 interview, Reid, by then going by the name Alexandra Tynan, described the motivation behind her designs was "I had a planning meeting that I had to be at, and I had to have a design drawing with me. My motivation was the clock on the wall!" Although the script specified the Cybermen should keep their human hands, Reid wanted them to wear gloves. However, Reid mistakenly forgot she said she would make special gloves for the Cybermen until the first day in the studio. Instead, make-up designer Gillian James hastily added silver paint to the actors' human hands. The chest units and "handles" were built by Shawcraft of Uxbridge. The handles were adapted from lorry headlamps, while the chest units used a lot of clear plastic and had battery-powered flashing mechanisms. The handles were intended as the housing for wires that lit up the lamps, but in a test shot the bulb exploded and the idea was dropped. Tynan explained in 2016, "I indicated that there was going to be a chest unit there, but I didn't do any designs for them, because I knew that the units were going to be a props thing."

Producer Innes Lloyd's production team wished to update the Cybermen for The Moonbase and make them look more sophisticated and robotic. Sandra Reid designed new costumes for this serial. These were based on a one-piece silver jumpsuit made from vinyl fabric, and the Cybermen were given gloves with three-fingered hands. Their boots were lace-up army boots painted silver. Fibreglass helmets and chest units made from aluminium were built by freelance prop makers Jack and John Lovell. Silver tape was added around the eye and mouth area for emphasis, and on Reid's instruction, the Lovells attached "hydraulic joints" consisting of tubing from a vacuum cleaner manufacturer and plastic practice golf balls. Costume designer Daphne Dare, consulting with Reid over the phone, took over midway through production of The Moonbase while Reid was recovering from surgery. Eight of these costumes were reused, with slight repainting and additions, for The Tomb of the Cybermen, Reid's final Doctor Who serial, and a new costume was built for the Cyber Controller, with a red-domed cranium built that was intended to light up, but the lighting mechanism failed.

For the filmed inserts in The Wheel in Space, Martin Baugh supervised the creation of the costumes, made from a thinner one-piece material. Junction boxes, linked by steel rods, were used at the joints and near the neck to give the impression of something more technological and functional than was seen in The Moonbase and The Tomb of the Cybermen. The same chest units from before were used, with the lamp at the bottom of the unit. New helmets were cast with simpler handles that extended out further from the head. These introduced a "teardrop" shape to the Cybermen's eyes. An unmodified The Tomb of the Cybermen suit was also used to swell the Cybermen's numbers during the spacewalk scene, and was positioned at the back to hide the difference from the other two costumes. Mid-production, the suits were redesigned again for the more extensive recordings of The Wheel in Space in the studio. Baugh's solution was to spray-paint two padded wet suits to make them look bulkier, with the helmets, junction boxes and rods from the filmed inserts modified or removed to make the actors move more freely. The hands from the earlier Wheel in Space costumes were cut off and used as gloves for the new costumes. The chest units were turned upside down so the lamps, mounted beneath the Cybermen's chins, could be fired as a weapon in a tighter shot.

For The Invasion, costume designer Bobi Bartlett ordered a resculpt of the helmet moulds with more head space for the actors to be done by outside company Trading Post. This included the sculpting of two large "ear muffs". The helmet was made of a light fibreglass. The costumes featured army boots, and now had five-fingered gloves, rather than three. Wetsuits were reused for this serial, and a simpler and sturdier version of the chest units, with the light at the top of the unit as before, was commissioned. At each of the joints there were now domes connected by a set of ribbed rods.

While production notes in Doctor Who: The Complete History claimed that the brief appearance of a Cyberman in Carnival of Monsters consisted of a diving suit from The Invasion, Gavin Rymill in Doctor Who Magazine wrote that this Cyberman was a Cyber Controller costume from The Tomb of the Cybermen. Both sources concurred that the helmet originated from The Invasion, and the back of the helmet was left unfastened.

Prue Handley was the costume designer on Revenge of the Cybermen. The costumes were built by freelance prop company Alister Bowtell, and were again based on wet suits, with rubber tubing along the arms and at the knees and elbow. The chest unit props from The Moonbase returned, and included bits of broken television sets. New, larger fibreglass helmets were made, and the costumes had silver gloves and Wellington boots.

The Earthshock designs by Dinah Collin included a set of Mk 2C RAF flight suits with built-in pipes used to pump cool air around. The Revenge of the Cybermen head was reshaped and recut by Richard Gregory of the freelance company Imagineering to add more details. There was a transparent section in the face through where the actor's moving jaw could be seen. New chest units were made in fibreglass, and they were decorated with ammunition trays. Also worn with the costumes were padded zip-back gloves and Tecnica Moon Boots. For "The Five Doctors" and Attack of the Cybermen, the jaw area was sprayed silver, and less ostentatious boots were worn. Anushia Nieradzik was the costume designer on Attack of the Cybermen. A specially modified Cyber Controller costume with a tall silver dome on its head was made for Attack of the Cybermen; as with the Controller costume used in The Tomb of the Cybermen, its helmet had no handles. For Silver Nemesis, the same head and chest pieces returned with a dappled plastic jaw and the removal of the ammunition trays. A plainer type of flight suit without built-in pipes was used for the bodies, and cable junction boxes with plastic tubes were added to the limbs for more detail. The costumes had cricket gloves sprayed silver, and Dr. Martens boots.

The redesign of the Cybermen in "Rise of the Cybermen" and "The Age of Steel" was a month-long process involving nearly every part of the design team. The production team decided on an Art Deco approach, and the final design was handed to Neill Gorton's team at Millennium FX, who also built the final costumes. The head was designed to be able to be turned independently from the body; such movement had not been possible in previous helmets. Millennium's Martin Rezard was the lead sculptor of a full-sized clay Cyberman, from which moulds were taken to create over forty fibreglass pieces to make up the head and body of each costume. Powdered aluminium was added to the final layer of the fibreglass, and each component was hand polished until it gleamed. Each of the fibreglass pieces were clipped onto a basic Lycra suit assembled by Jo Glover. The gloves and neck were cast in a soft silver-tinted silicone by Helen Rowe and Alex Whathey. Ten Cyberman costumes were made, including the Cyber Controller, which had a visible brain and pipes connecting him to his life support systems. In "A Good Man Goes to War" the costumes no longer had the Cybus Industries "C" logo introduced in "Rise of the Cybermen".

The sleeker and more elegant design introduced in "Nightmare in Silver" was made by the Millennium FX team from flexible polyurethane rubber, painted to look metallic using a new process originally developed for use in the car industry.

The "Mondasian Cybermen" in "World Enough and Time" and "The Doctor Falls" were created by the Millennium FX team, and were an updated version of Sandra Reid's 1966 design of the Cybermen for The Tenth Planet. The Chest units and helmets and other like attachments were moulded and constructed by Millennium FX. The costumes themselves were built from a silver latex fabric by costume designer Robin Archer. The Cybermen's hands were covered by rubber gloves. Millennium also created the transitional "patients" that evolve into Cybermen from the two-parter. Despite the Tenth Planet Cybermen not having gloves, director Rachel Talalay said that the reason for adding them to the Mondasian Cybermen in the series 10 two-part finale was "partially an issue because of skintone" with Pearl Mackie's Cyberman, but also to "get a scarier feel and something more artificial by putting the gloves on them". She further explained that in The Tenth Planet it was hard to tell if they had skintone gloves or not to justify their addition.

Unlike the Doctor's other foes, the Cybermen costumes have changed substantially in appearance over the years, looking more and more modern, although retaining certain commonalities of design, the most iconic being the "handles" attached to Cybermen heads. Other design elements include their round eyeholes and their chest units.

Aside from these changes, variations in design between rank-and-file Cybermen and their leaders have been seen. In The Wheel in Space and The Invasion (both 1968), the Cyber Director was depicted as an immobile mechanism. The Cyber Leader in "The Next Doctor" sports a transparent brain casing.

Because the Doctor is a time traveller, he meets the Cybermen at various points in their history out of sequence from the order the serials were made. This can be confusing since Cybermen from serials set in "earlier" periods of history can sometimes look more sophisticated than those from "later" periods. Lawrence Miles suggests in his reference work About Time 5 that the anachronistically designed Cybermen of Earthshock and Silver Nemesis are time travellers, like those in Attack of the Cybermen. The Doctor Who Role Playing Game "Cyber Files" worked around the contradiction by stating that in The Tenth Planet, the oldest designs of Cybermen were used for the attack while the later more sophisticated models remained on Mondas.

The Torchwood episode "Cyberwoman" features a partially cyber-converted woman who lacks the outer plating of a fully converted Cyberman. Her body is encased in metal structures but much of her flesh, including her face, is visible. She also has clearly visible metallic breasts, though it is not clear how much of her own flesh has been replaced and how much is merely covered. Another character speculates she could be 40–45% human, and 55–60% Cyberman.

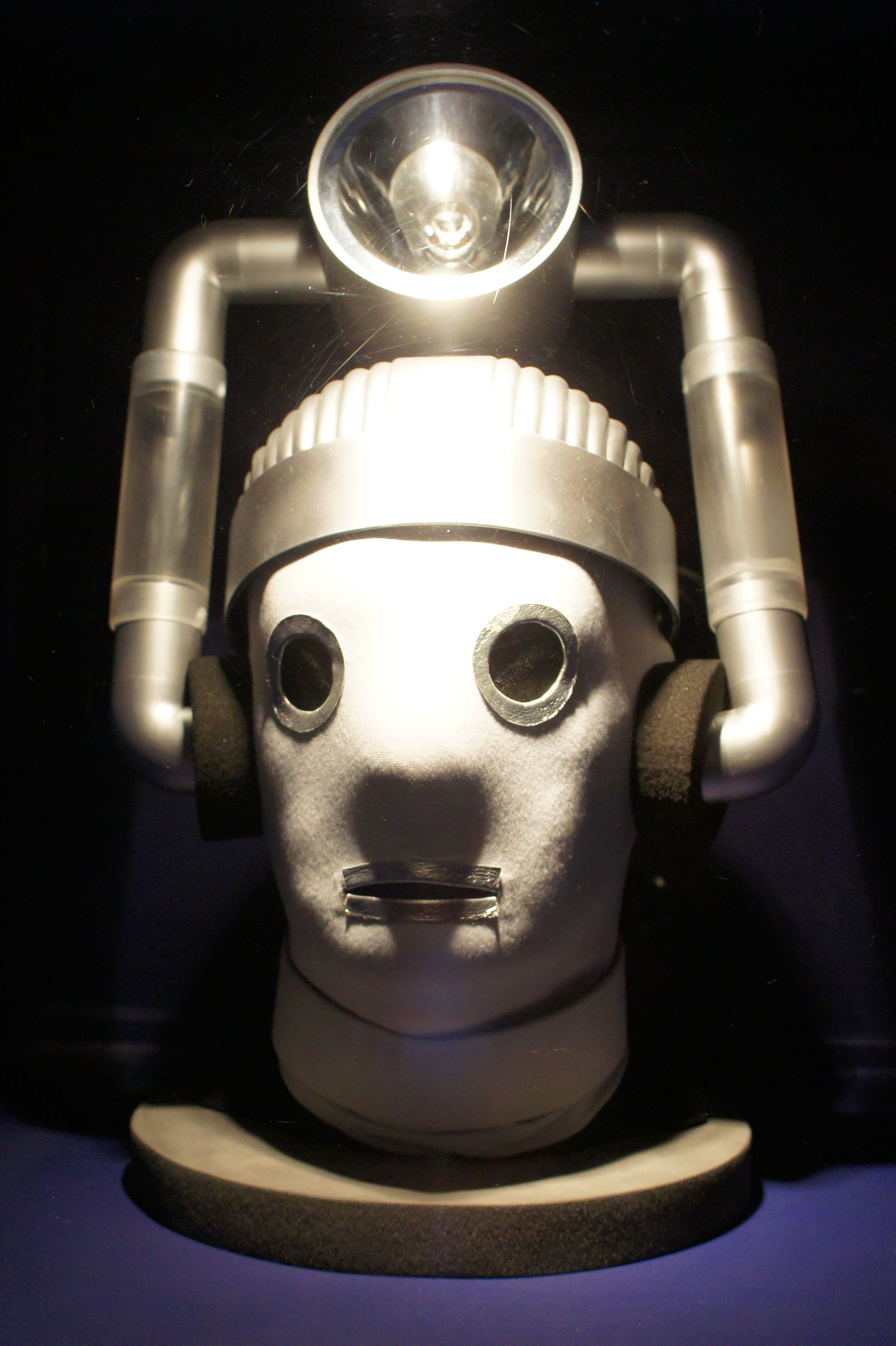
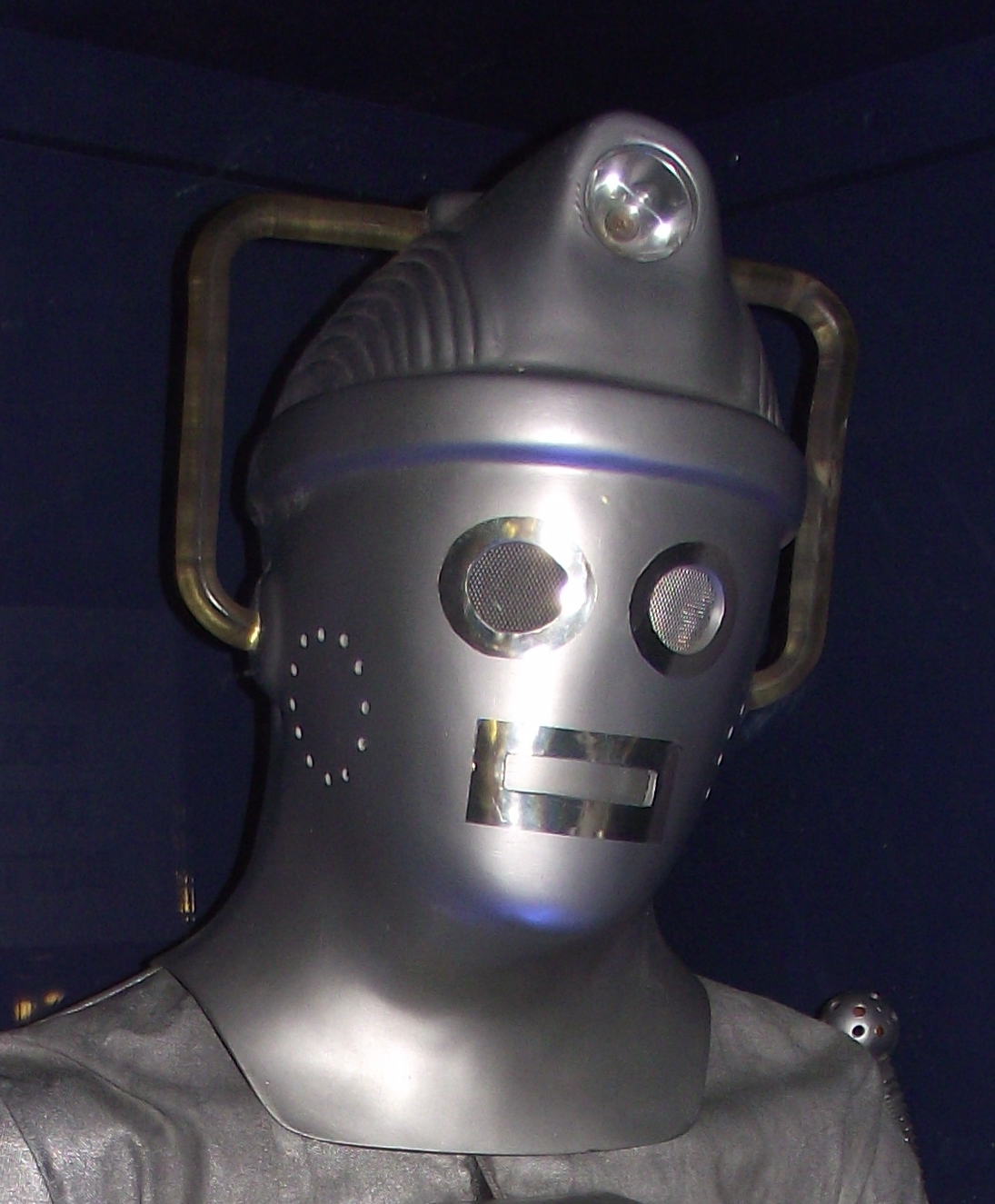
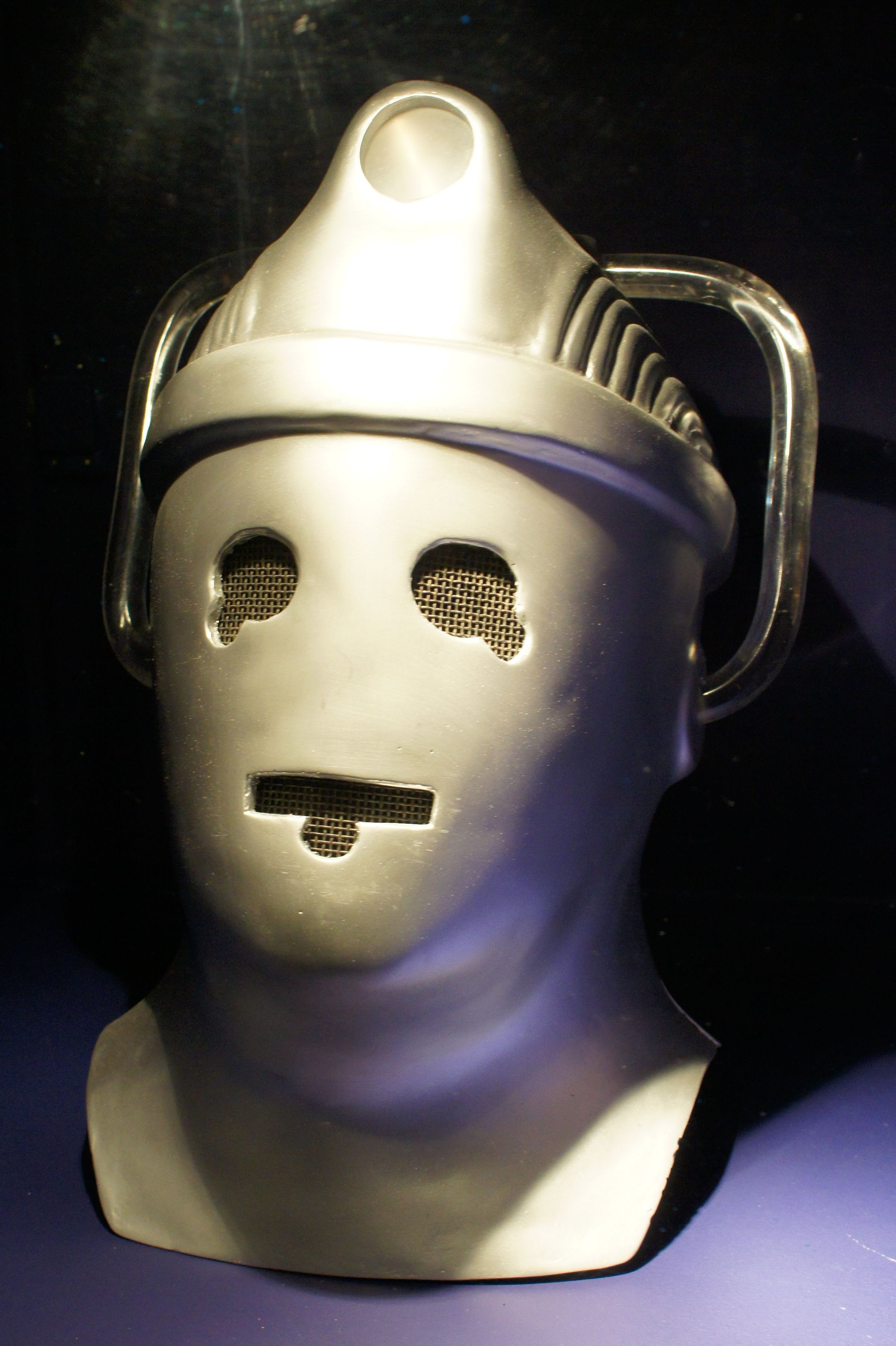
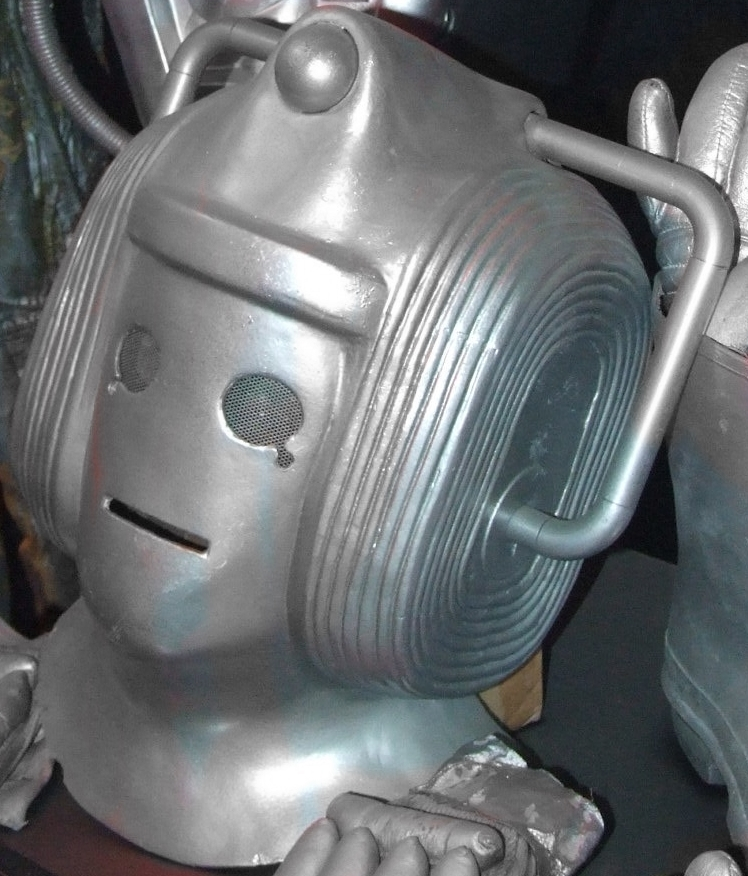
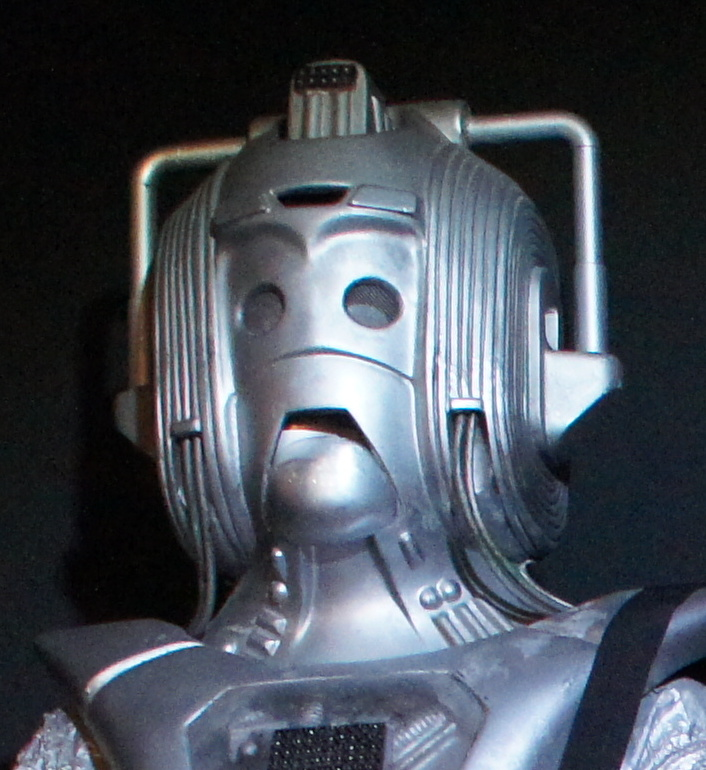
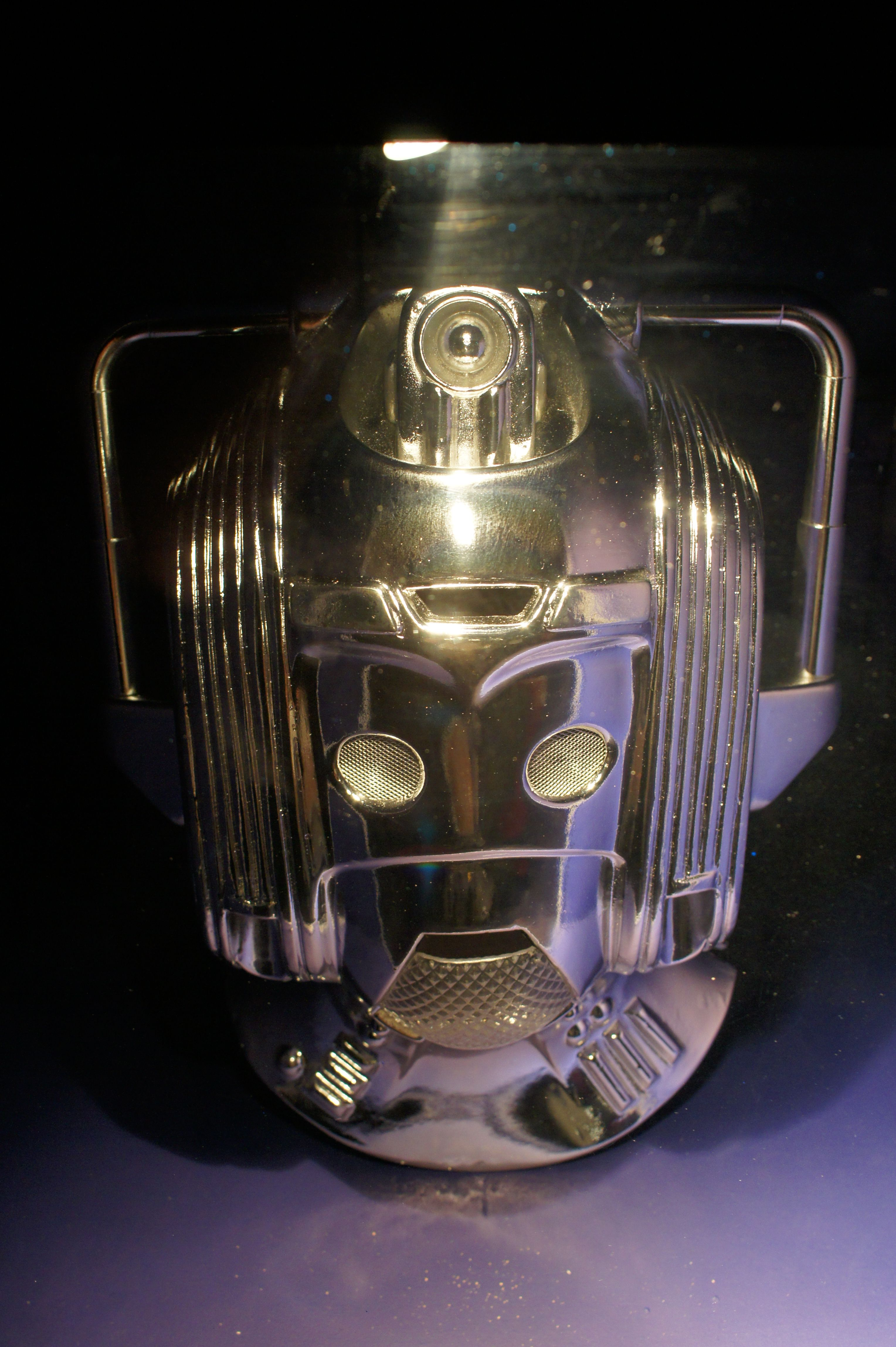
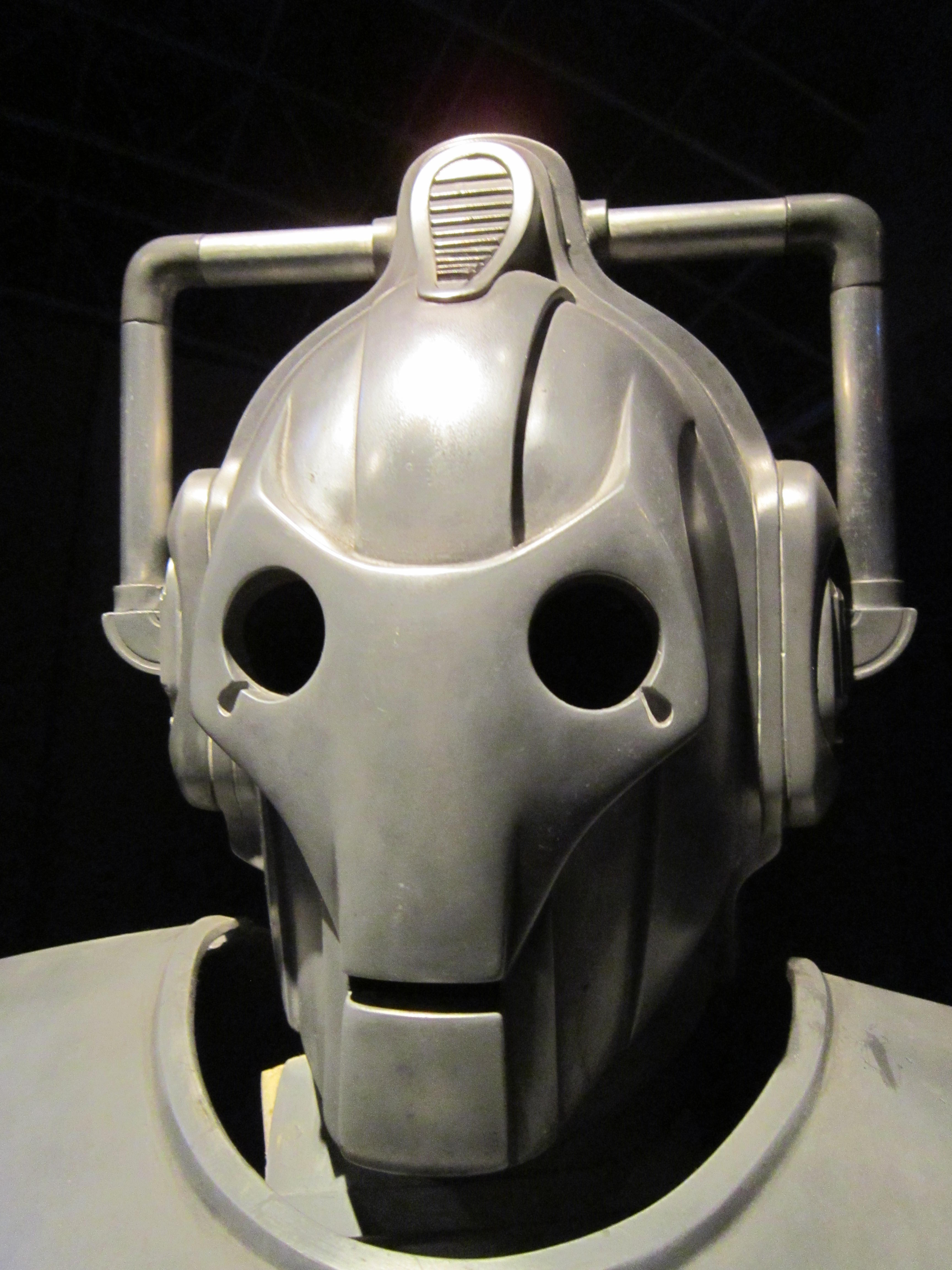
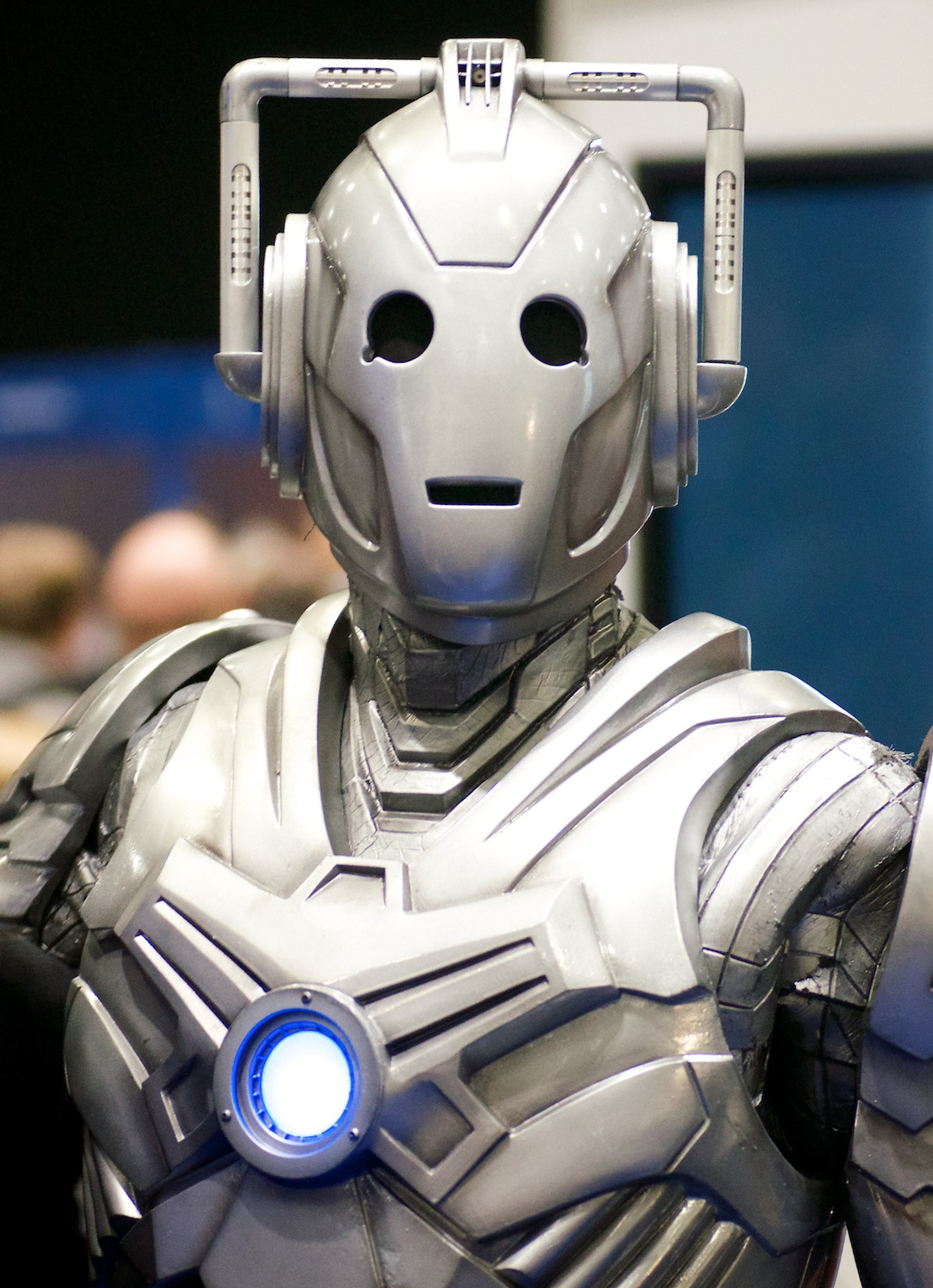
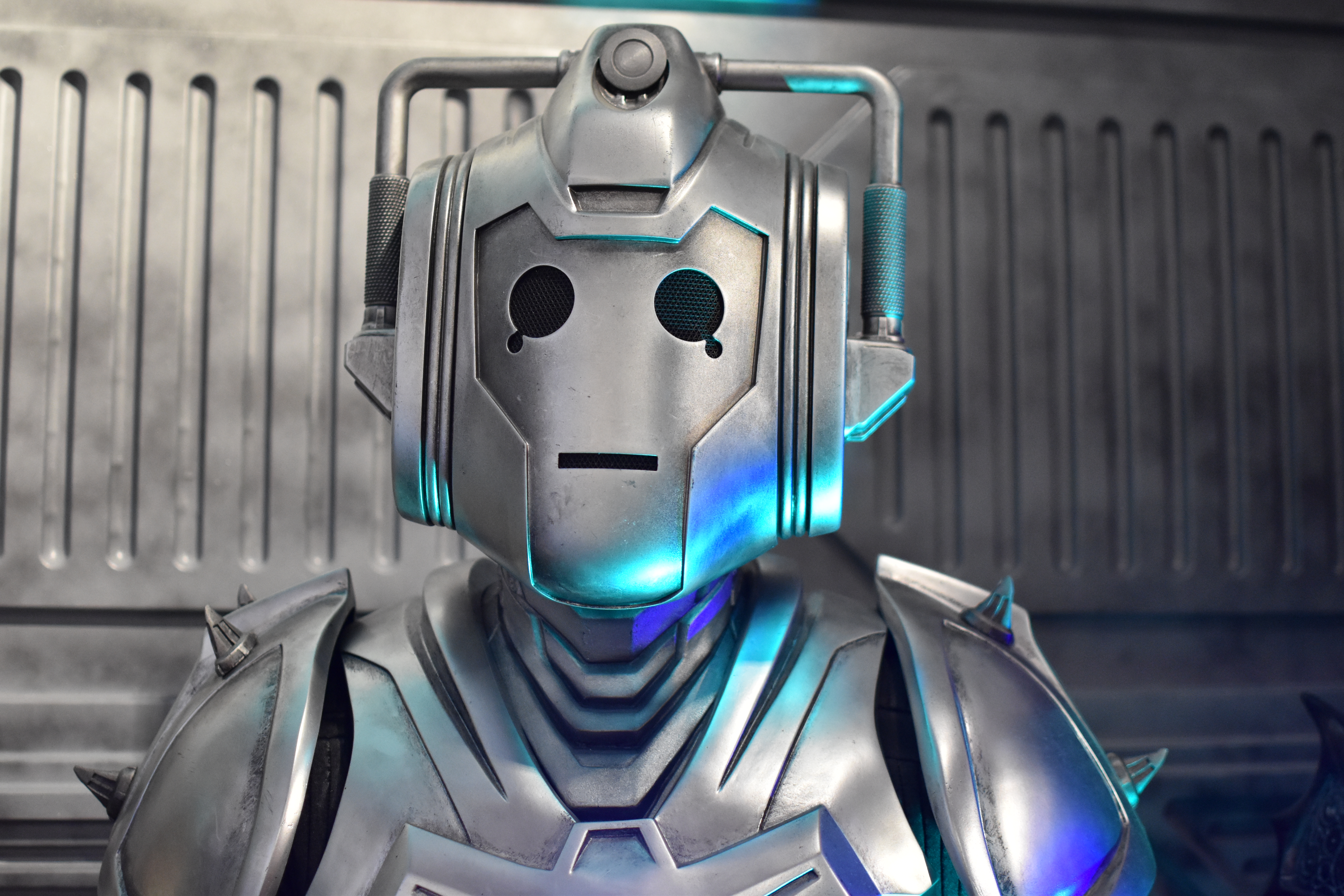
Evolution of the Cybermen. As shown at the Doctor Who Experience.

=== Voice ===
Early Cybermen had an unsettling, sing-song voice, provided by Roy Skelton, constructed by placing the inflections of words on the wrong syllables. In their first appearance, the effect of this was augmented by having a Cyberman abruptly open his mouth wide and keep it open, without moving his tongue or lips, while the separately recorded voice would be playing, and then shut it quickly when the line was finished. Although the cloth-like masks of the first Cybermen were soon replaced by a full helmet, a similar physical effect involving the mouth "hatch" opening and then shutting when the line was finished was used until The Wheel in Space (1968).

Later, the production team used special effects from its Radiophonic Workshop by adding first a mechanical larynx used by Peter Hawkins, then a vocoder, to modify speech to make it sound more artificial. In later stories of the original series and in the audio plays, two copies of the voice track were sampled and pitch-shifted downwards by differing amounts and layered to produce the effect, sometimes with the addition of a small amount of flanging. From Revenge of the Cybermen to Silver Nemesis (1988) the actors provided the voices themselves, using microphones and transmitters in the chest units.

The voices for the 2006 return of the Cybermen are similar to the buzzing electronic monotone voices of the Cybermen used in The Invasion. They were provided by Nicholas Briggs. As shown in the second series of Doctor Who Confidential, the timbre was created by processing Briggs' voice through a Moog moogerfooger ring modulator. Unusually, in "The Age of Steel", the Cyber-Controller (John Lumic, played by Roger Lloyd-Pack) retains his voice after being upgraded, but it is still electronic. In "Doomsday", a Cyberman which contains the brain of Torchwood Institute director Yvonne Hartman retains a female-sounding though still electronic voice, as does the partially converted Lisa Hallett in "Cyberwoman" when her Cyberman personality is dominant. In an effect reminiscent of the earliest Cybermen's mouths snapping open while speaking, the new Cybermen have a blue light in their "mouths" (or "teeth") which illuminates in synchronisation with their speech.

Since "The Next Doctor" in 2008, the Cybermen have had nasally-sounding electronic voices; this continued all the way until "Closing Time" in 2011. Between the 2013 episode "Nightmare in Silver" and 2017 episode "The Doctor Falls", the Cybermen (continuing to be voiced by Briggs) now have deep, almost growl-like voices. Their mouths retain a blue light-up effect but flicker luminously instead of staying lit as opposed to the 2006 design.

The Patients in "World Enough and Time" (Pre Mondasian Cybermen) communicated through speech synthesis keyboards, similar to those used in hospitals for people unable to talk normally or use their vocal cords. These voices were disturbing in that they almost 'replicated' actual human speech, but with stilted delivery

== Variants ==
Some Cybermen are given titles, being credited as "Cyber Leader" (or variants thereof), "Cyber Lieutenant", "Cyber Scout" or the "Cyber Controller". The Cyber Leader is usually depicted as a Cyberman with black handles.

An immobile computer, referred to as the "Cyber Planner", appears in The Wheel in Space and The Invasion. A Cyber Planner also takes over the Eleventh Doctor's body in "Nightmare in Silver".

The original Controller is seen (and destroyed) in two serials, The Tomb of the Cybermen and Attack of the Cybermen, and in each may or may not be the same consciousness in different bodies; it appears to recognise and remember the Doctor from previous encounters. In the Virgin New Adventures novel Iceberg, the first Cyber Controller is created by implanting a Cyber Director, or Cyber Planner, into the skull of a recently converted Cyberman.

The parallel universe Cyber Controller in "The Age of Steel" uses the brain of John Lumic, the creator of the Cybermen in that parallel reality.

In "Doomsday", a Cyber Leader appears, and when he is destroyed, mention is made of downloading his data files into another Cyberman unit, which is then upgraded to Cyber Leader.

The 2008 Christmas special, "The Next Doctor", featured a new, more agile variant called a Cybershade. The Doctor theorises that it is a more primitive version of a Cyberman, using the brain of a cat, and they physically resemble animals as they cannot speak and walk on all fours. In the same story a "Cyber-King" appears; according to the Doctor, it is a "Dreadnought-class" ship for use in invasions resembling a Cyberman hundreds of feet tall, and contains a Cyber-factory in its chest. It is controlled from within its mouth. Its right arm can be converted into a cannon, and its left into a laser. "The Time of the Doctor" introduced a unique prototype Cyberman that was made of wood to avoid detection by the Church of the Papal Mainframe and equipped with blowtorches.

After Bill Potts is wounded on the bridge of a Mondasian colony ship, and taken down the ship's lifts to be surgically repaired, she encounters half converted Mondasians referred to only as 'The Patients'. They wore grey surgical robes and their faces were entirely covered with cloth bags, save for a nasal canula that administered fluids and all were hooked up to IV drips. Most remained stationary; reliant on wheelchairs in the "out ward" while some walked the hospital grounds; being prepped for additional surgery and rounding up humans in the city and leading them to the hospital. During the early stages of these experiments (a precursor to cyber-conversion), The Patients were shown to feel the pain caused by this process, with some even begging for death, twisting in their chairs and jabbing at their speech keyboards. They were capable of attacking, following commands (such as restraining Bill) and possessed great strength. They could be incapacitated, though not killed by gunfire.

In "Ascension of the Cybermen" (2020), Cyber Warriors are introduced who are a "Warrior Class" of Cyberman. Their armour is specifically designed in a medieval way, giving the appearance of a medieval warrior. The chest is that of a 2013 Cyberman but with less detail, while their helmets bear a resemblance to the Cybermen from The Invasion. They also have small energy cannons on their wrists. In the following episode "The Timeless Children", the Master creates the "Cyber Masters", a new breed created from Cyberium and Time Lord corpses. These Cybermen, while resembling the Cyber-Warriors, have Time Lord apparel built into their armour, such as their headdresses. These Cybermen were loyal to the Master, and had the ability to regenerate, making them a potentially unstoppable threat. They also appeared in "The Power of the Doctor" with updated designs.

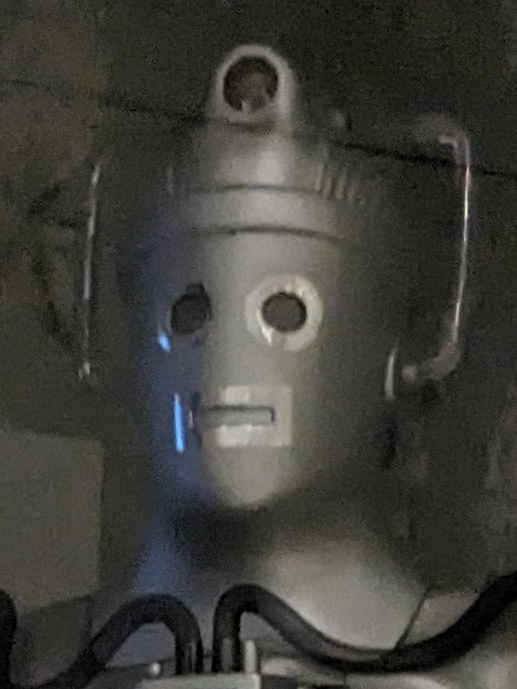
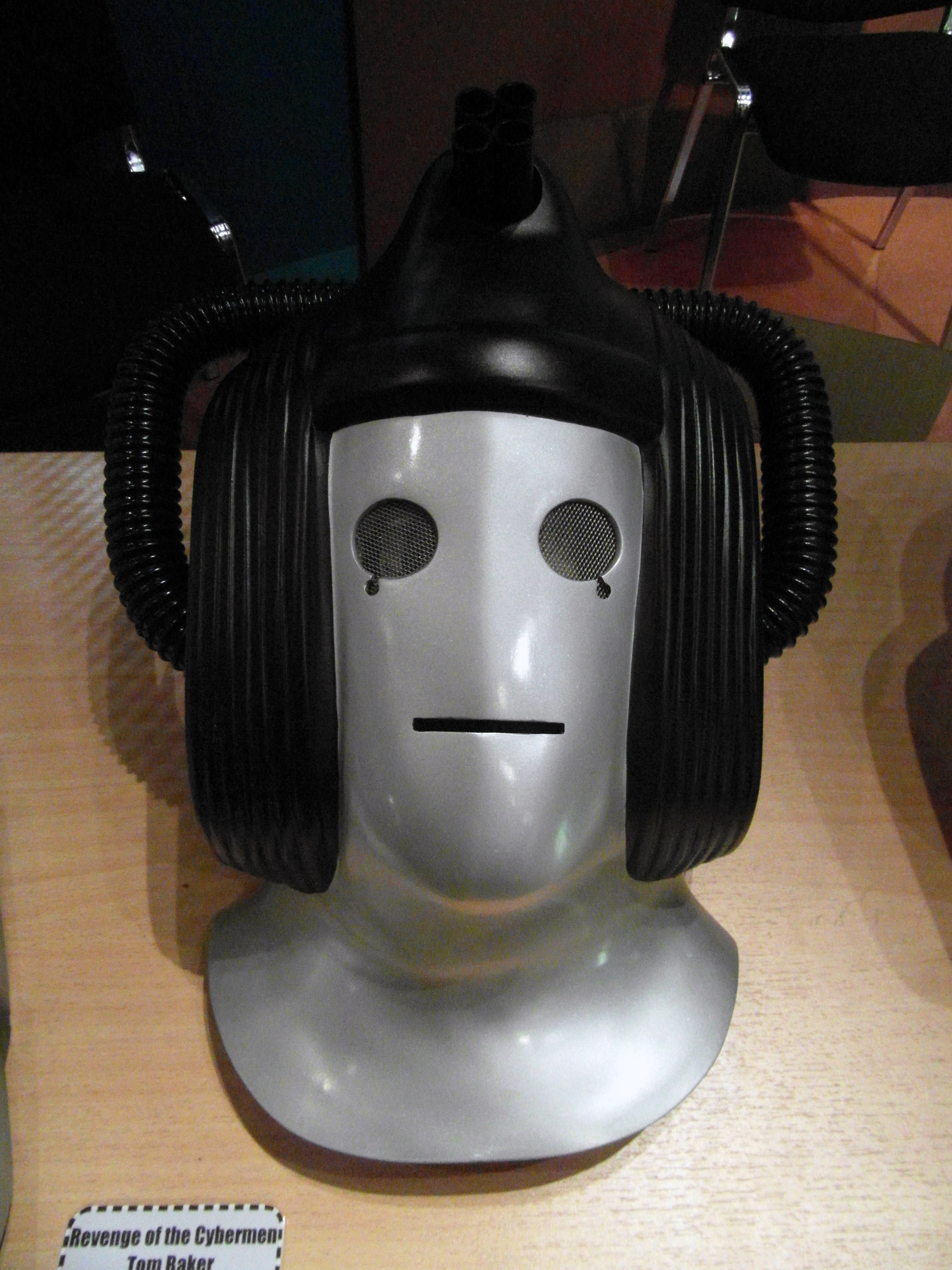
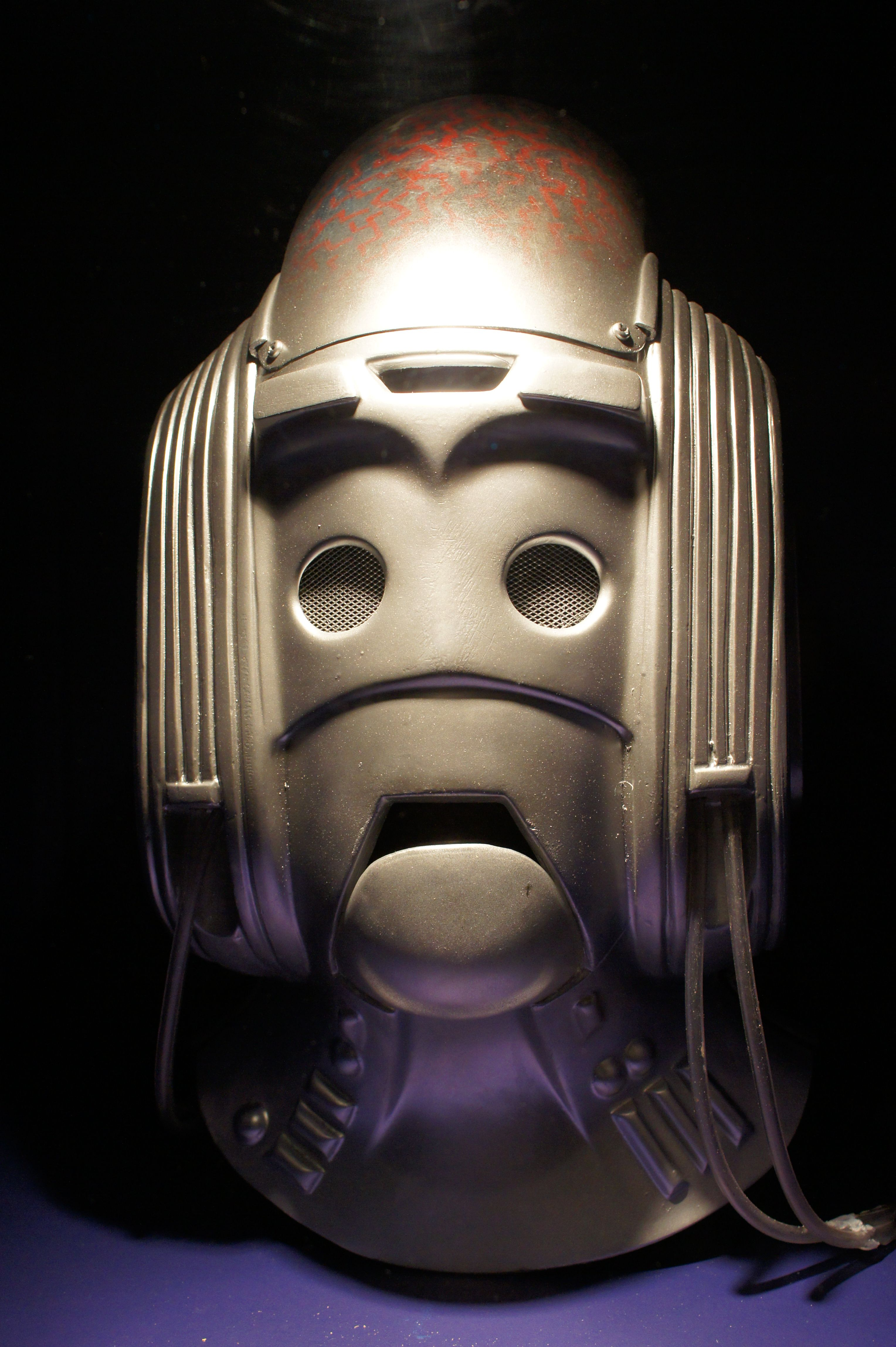
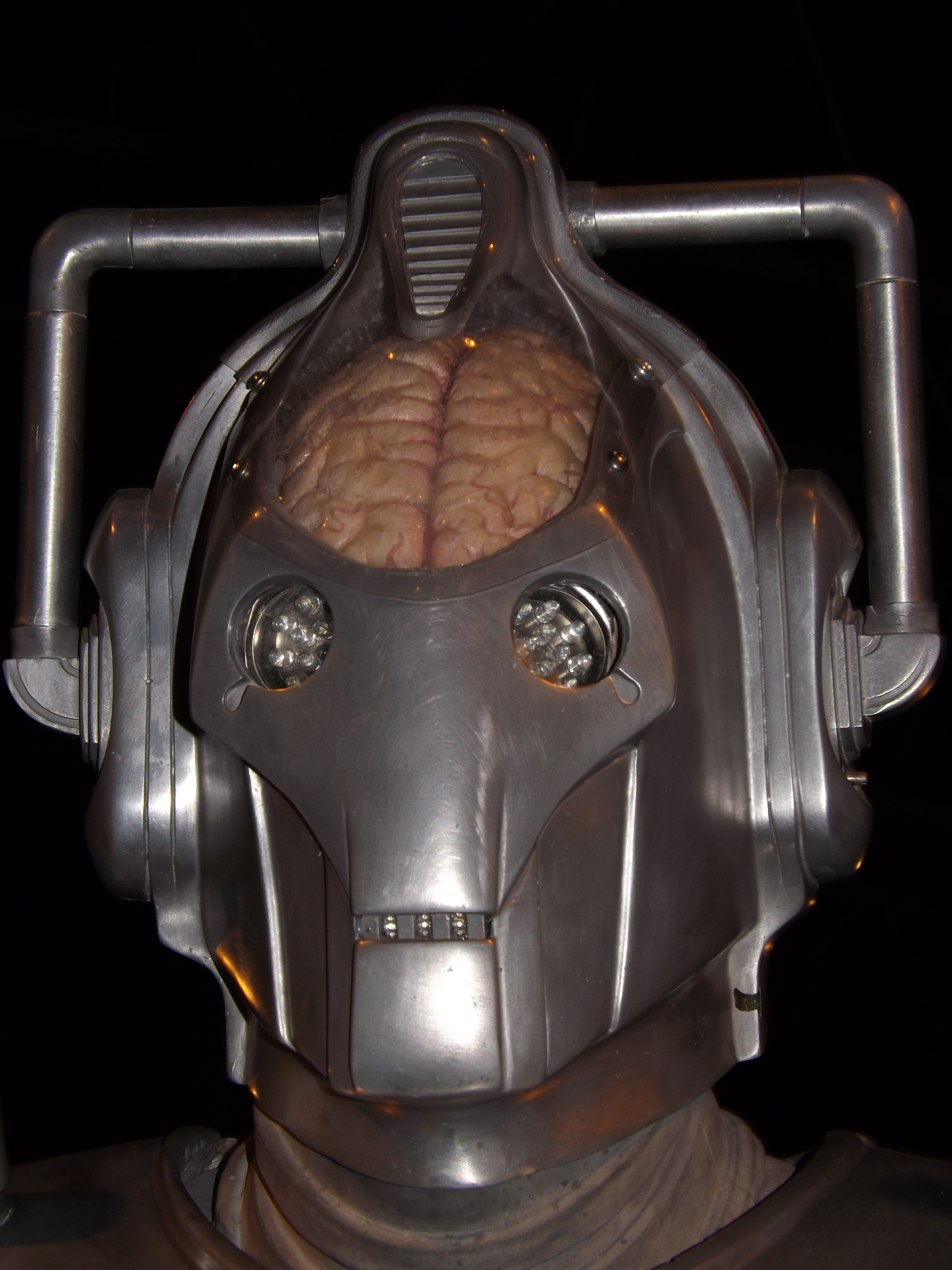
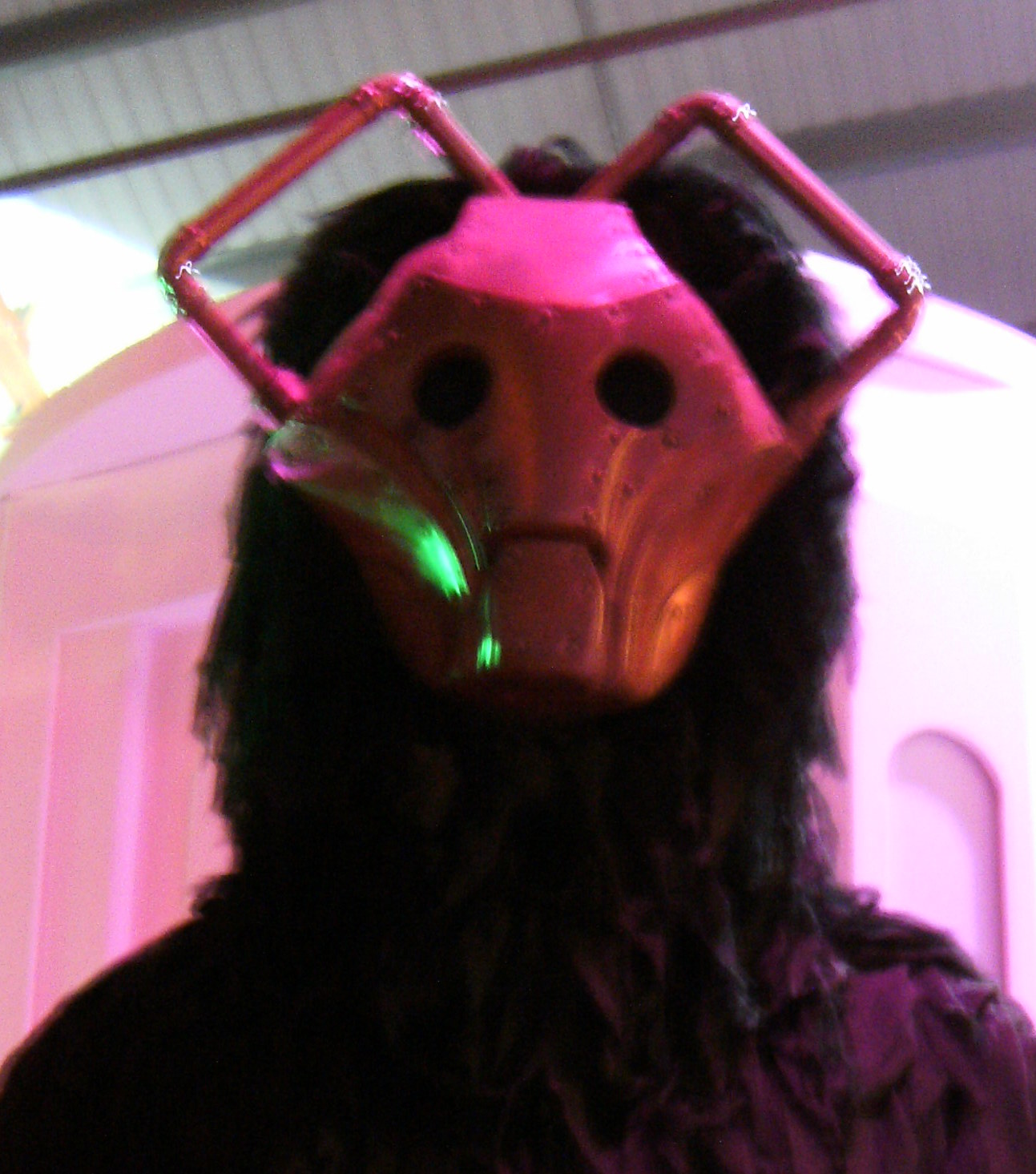
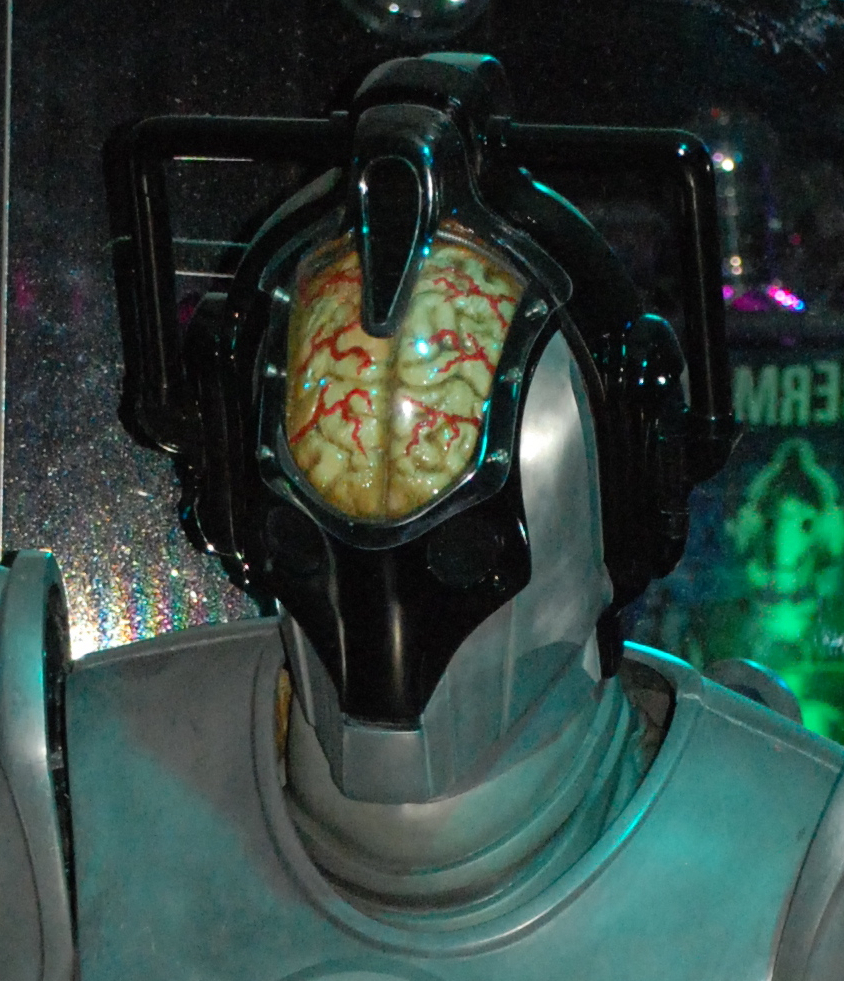
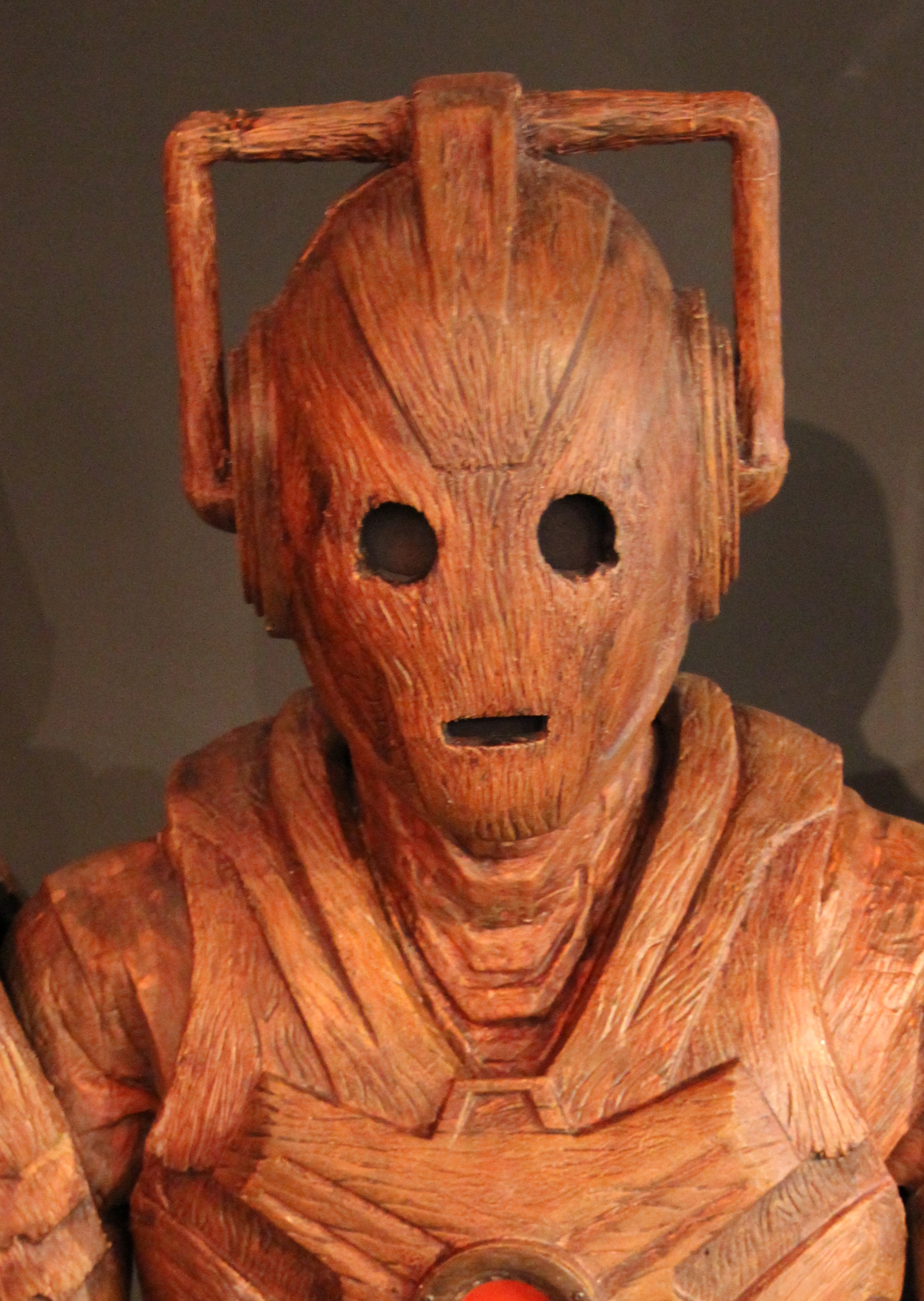
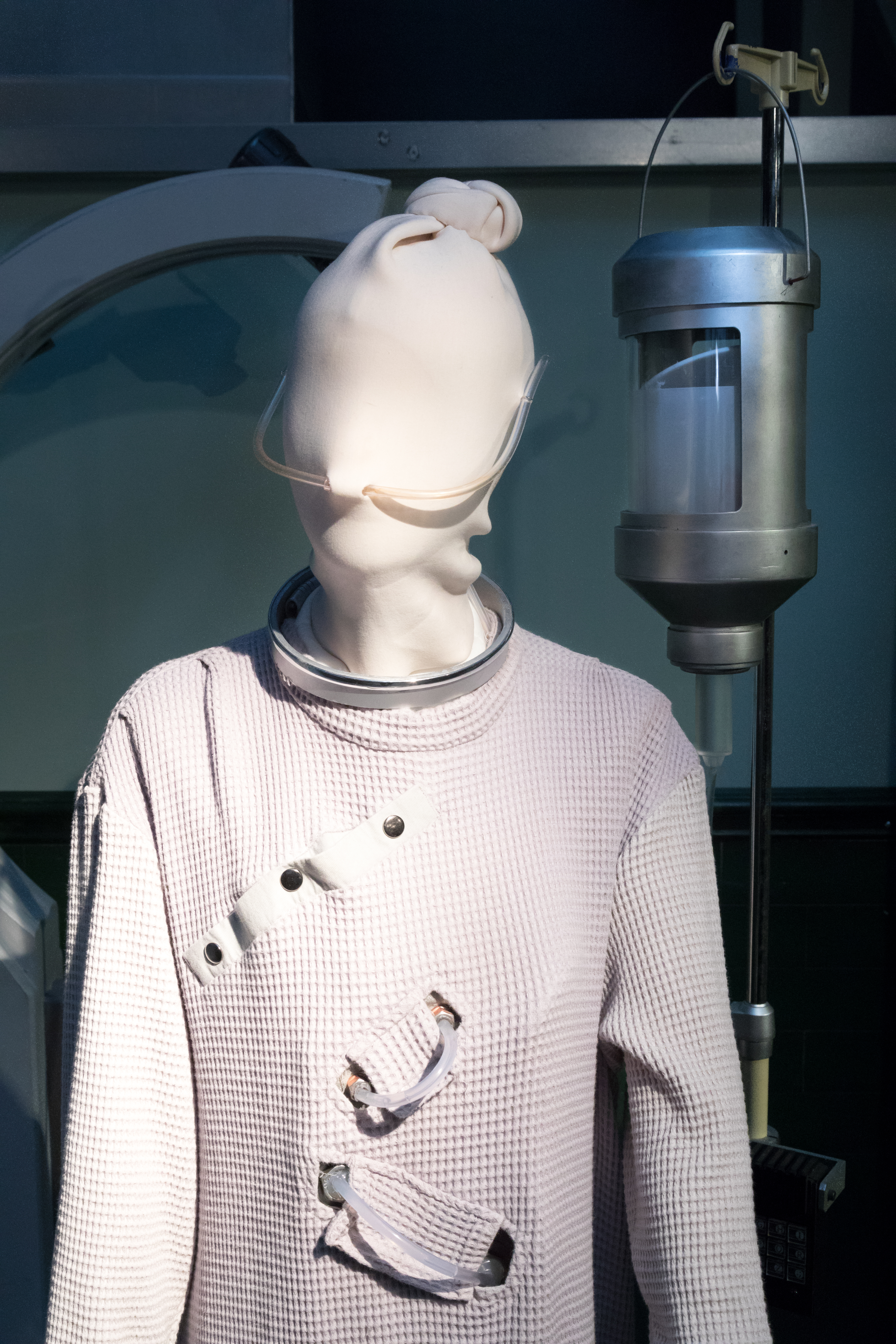
Variants of the Cybermen. As shown at various Doctor Who exhibitions.

== Technology ==
Cybermen technology is almost completely oriented towards weaponry, apart from their own bodies. When originally seen in The Tenth Planet, they had large energy weapons that attached to their chests. In The Moonbase, the Cybermen had two types of weaponry: an electrical discharge from their hands, which stunned the target, and a type of gun. They also made use of a large laser cannon with which they attempted to attack the base itself.

The hand discharge was also present in The Tomb of the Cybermen, which featured a smaller, hand-held Cyber-weapon shaped like a pistol that was described as an X-ray laser. In The Wheel in Space, the Cybermen could use the discharge to also operate machinery, and had death rays built into their chest units. They displayed the same units in The Invasion as well as carrying large rifles for medium distance combat. In Revenge of the Cybermen and the audio play Real Time, their weapons were built into their helmets. Killing Ground indicates that this type of Cybermen also have more powerful hand weapons. Subsequent appearances have shown them armed almost exclusively with hand-held gun-style weapons.

The Cybermen have access to weapons of mass destruction known as cobalt bombs, also sometimes as Cyber-bombs, which were banned by the galactic Armageddon Convention (Revenge of the Cybermen). A "Cyber-megatron bomb" was mentioned in The Invasion, supposedly powerful enough to destroy all life on Earth. In Earthshock, the Cybermen also used android drones as part of their plans to invade Earth.

The revived programme Cybermen electrocute their victims by touching them and at first carried no other weaponry. In "Army of Ghosts" and "Doomsday", the Cybermen are equipped with retractable energy weapons housed within their forearms (these were actually first shown in "The Age of Steel", but only very briefly and were not used during that episode), but also use advanced human weapons to battle the Daleks. The arm mounted guns prove effective against humans but are unable to penetrate Dalek shields. Two Cybermen sent to parley with Dalek Thay at the Battle of Canary Wharf shot the Dalek but were promptly exterminated. In the Torchwood episode "Cyberwoman", the partially converted Lisa Hallett used her electrical touch against the Torchwood team, as well as an energy beam fired from her arm which could only stun the part of the body at which it was aimed. In "The Pandorica Opens", the Cybermen again have the wrist-blaster, but also regain the modified human weapons. In "Nightmare in Silver", the Cybermen have the ability to move at a warp-like speed. At this speed they appear as blurry after images. Cyberman had also overcome the weakness of solely being able to convert human-like species; the Doctor had been safe from being in danger of conversion until this point.

The Mondasian Cybermen from The Tenth Planet were updated for the Series 10 Finale. As opposed to shooting from their chest pieces they used their lanterns as weapons. This was in the Novelisation for The Tenth Planet. They also had the ability to emit electricity.

=== Cybermat ===
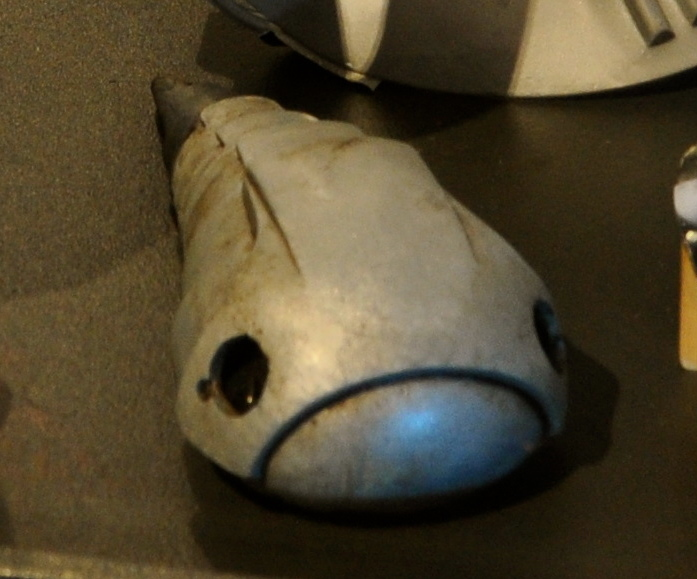
The Cybermat, on display at the Doctor Who Experience.

The Cybermen also use smaller, cybernetic creatures called "cybermats" as weapons of attack. In their first appearance in The Tomb of the Cybermen, they resembled oversized metallic silverfish and had segmented bodies with hair-like tactile sensor probes along the base of their heads, which were topped with crystalline eyes. The Second Doctor described them as a "form of metallic life," implying that they may be semi-organic like the Cybermen, and that they too attack by feeding off brain waves. They were defeated using electricity.

The second model of Cybermat seen in The Wheel in Space was used for sabotage, able to tune in on human brainwaves. They were carried to the "Wheel" in small but high-density sacs that sank through the hull of the space station, causing drops in air pressure. These Cybermats had solid photoreceptors for eyes instead of crystals. The Second Doctor used an audio frequency to jam them, causing them to spin, crash and disintegrate.

The third model, seen in Revenge of the Cybermen, was a much larger, snake-like cybermat that could be remotely controlled and could inject poison into its victims. It had no visible eyes or other features, and was as vulnerable to gold dust as the Cybermen were.

The original model was later mentioned in a conversation between the Doctor and his double during The Rebel Flesh, reaffirming that that model of Cybermat killed by feeding on brainwaves.

The fourth model of cybermat appears for the first time in the revived series in the 2011 episode "Closing Time", where it is shown to have an organic mouth full of sharp teeth, and transmits power to a crashed cyber-ship.

In the audio play Spare Parts, "mats" are cybernetically augmented creatures, sometimes kept as pets. Cybermats of a different design are used for surveillance by Mondas' Central Committee. The creatures occasionally go wild, chewing on power sources, and must be rounded up by a "mat-catcher." In the Past Doctor Adventures novel Illegal Alien by Mike Tucker and Robert Perry, set in the 1940s, the Cybermen create cybermats by cyber-converting local animals like cats or birds, possibly because of lack of technological resources.

In the Bernice Summerfield audio adventure The Crystal of Cantus, a Cyberman reveals that the organs of children who are too small to be fully cyber-converted are used in the creation of cybermats.

The cybermats appeared in the video game "Blood of the Cybermen" where instead of killing, they turned individuals into cyberslaves. The slaves have mostly human bodies, but have Cyberman heads and arms. The Cybermen see the cyberslaves as inferior, and delete them once they have served their purpose.

An upgraded form of cybermats, referred to as cybermites, appeared in "Nightmare in Silver". They were incredibly small mechanical insects that were more versatile and were able to partially convert other lifeforms into Cybermen.

== See also ==
- Borg (Star Trek)
- Cylon (Battlestar Galactica)
