= Alexandra Tynan =

Alexandra Tynan, also credited as Sandra Reid, is a costume designer best known for her design of the Cybermen in the BBC Television series Doctor Who.

Tynan trained at Belfast College of Art and worked as a costume designer for the Royal Shakespeare Company and the National Theatre before accepting a staff role at the BBC in 1964.

== Doctor Who ==
Credited as Sandra Reid, Tynan worked on eight Doctor Who serials including William Hartnell's final story, The Tenth Planet, which included the first appearance of the Cybermen, devised by Dr Kit Pedler and his writing partner Gerry Davis. Prior to her Cybermen designs, Tynan had not worked on science fiction before. She redesigned her creations for the 1967 serial The Moonbase.

Tynan also worked on Patrick Troughton's first serial The Power of the Daleks and was responsible for realising the production team's ideas for his "cosmic hobo" look.

== Later career ==
After work on a wide range of programmes, Tynan left the BBC in 1968 and emigrated to Australia. She subsequently became a lecturer in costume, fashion and textiles as well as continuing to work in costume design for television production.
