= The Reign of Terror (Doctor Who) =

008 – The Reign of Terror
- Doctor Who serial
- Susan Foreman and Barbara Wright are en route to execution by the guillotine. Susan's role as a damsel in distress was criticised.

Cast
- Doctor: William Hartnell – First Doctor
- Companions: William Russell – Ian Chesterton; Jacqueline Hill – Barbara Wright; Carole Ann Ford – Susan Foreman
- Others: Keith Anderson – Robespierre; Jack Cunningham – Jailer; Jeffry Wickham – Webster; Neville Smith – D'Argenson; Laidlaw Dalling – Rouvray; Peter Walker – Small Boy; James Cairncross – Lemaitre; Roy Herrick – Jean; Donald Morley – Jules Renan; Tony Wall – Napoléon Bonaparte; Caroline Hunt – Danielle; Edward Brayshaw – Léon Colbert; John Law – Paul Barras; Dallas Cavell – Road Works Overseer; Dennis Cleary – Peasant; John Barrard – Shopkeeper; Ronald Pickup – Physician; Howard Charlton – Judge; Robert Hunter – Sergeant; Ken Lawrence – Lieutenant; James Hall, Patrick Marley, Terry Bale – Soldiers

Production
- Directed by: Henric Hirsch (Note: The third episode was not directed by Hirsch, though he remained credited. Documentation indicates that John Gorrie oversaw production, but he has no memory of it.)
- Written by: Dennis Spooner
- Script editor: David Whitaker
- Produced by: Verity Lambert
- Music by: Stanley Myers
- Production code: H
- Series: Season 1
- Running time: 6 episodes, 25 minutes each
- Episode(s) missing: 2 episodes (4 and 5)
- First broadcast: 8 August 1964
- Last broadcast: 12 September 1964

Chronology
← Preceded by The Sensorites	Followed by → Planet of Giants

The Reign of Terror is the eighth serial of the British science fiction television series Doctor Who, which was first broadcast on BBC1 in six weekly parts from 8 August to 12 September 1964. It was written by Dennis Spooner and directed by Henric Hirsch. In the serial, the First Doctor (William Hartnell), his granddaughter Susan (Carole Ann Ford), and teachers Ian Chesterton (William Russell) and Barbara Wright (Jacqueline Hill) arrive in France during the period of the French Revolution known as the Reign of Terror, where they become involved with prisoners and English spies.

Initially interested in writing a science fiction story, Spooner was asked to write a historical serial by script editor David Whitaker. He eventually decided to focus on the French Revolution, a setting first suggested by Russell. Hirsch underwent difficulties during production; he collapsed before filming the third episode, and was replaced until the following week. The serial premiered with 6.9 million viewers, maintaining audience figures throughout the six weeks. Response for the serial was mixed, with criticism aimed at the story and historical inaccuracies. Two of the six episodes remain missing after the BBC wiped them from archives. It later received several print adaptations and home media releases, with animated versions of the missing episodes constructed using off-air recordings.

== Plot ==
The First Doctor (William Hartnell), his granddaughter Susan Foreman (Carole Ann Ford) and her teachers Ian Chesterton (William Russell) and Barbara Wright (Jacqueline Hill) arrive outside Paris in 18th-century France and venture to a nearby farmhouse. They find it is being used as a staging post in an escape chain for counter-revolutionaries during the Reign of Terror. They are discovered by two counter-revolutionaries, D'Argenson (Neville Smith) and Rouvray (Laidlaw Dalling), who knock the Doctor unconscious and hold the others at gunpoint. A band of revolutionary soldiers surrounds the house and both D'Argenson and Rouvray are killed during the siege. The soldiers capture Ian, Barbara, and Susan and march them to Paris to be guillotined. The soldiers set fire to the farmhouse, and the Doctor is saved by a young boy (Peter Walker), who tells him that his friends have been taken to the Conciergerie Prison in Paris. He sets off after them.

Ian, Barbara, and Susan are all sentenced to death as traitors. Ian is confined in one cell, while the women are taken to another. Ian's cellmate is an Englishman named Webster (Jeffry Wickham), who tells him that there is an English spy, James Stirling, highly placed in the French Government, who is now being recalled to England. Webster dies, and a government official named Lemaitre (James Cairncross) arrives and probes any conversation between Ian and the dead man. Lemaitre crosses Ian's name off the execution list. En route to the guillotine, Barbara and Susan's transport is hijacked by two men, Jules (Donald Morley) and Jean (Roy Herrick), who take them to a safe house. They are told that they will be smuggled out of France through the escape chain. Jules and Jean reassure Barbara that they will try to reunite them with Ian and the Doctor. They are then joined by another counter-revolutionary, named Léon Colbert (Edward Brayshaw).

The Doctor reaches Paris and exchanges his clothes for those of a Regional Officer of the Provinces. He heads for the Conciergerie, but finds his companions gone; Ian has successfully stolen the key to his cell and escaped. Lemaitre arrives and takes the Doctor to visit Maximilien Robespierre (Keith Anderson) to report on his province. Ian follows Webster's words and finds Jules Renan, who turns out to be the man sheltering Barbara and Susan; the latter is ill in bed. When Barbara takes Susan to a physician (Ronald Pickup), they are recaptured by revolutionary police. Ian meets Colbert only to find he is the mole in the escape chain and there are armed troops waiting for him. Jules rescues Ian, killing Colbert in the process. The Doctor has returned to the Conciergerie, where Lemaitre reports that Robespierre wishes to see him again the following day. Lemaitre ensures that the Doctor spends the night in the Conciergerie in order that he remain in Paris for his second audience with Robespierre. He is still there when Barbara and Susan are brought in as prisoners. With Susan too weak to be moved, he engineers Barbara's release on the pretext that she can be trailed to lead the security forces to the core of the escape chain. Jules and Ian return to Jules's house and are stunned to meet Barbara.

Robespierre suspects his deputy, Paul Barras (John Law), is conspiring against him and asks Lemaitre to track Barras to a secret assignation at an inn outside the city. When Lemaitre heads back to the Conciergerie, he privately unmasks the Doctor as an impostor. Lemaitre insists that the Doctor help him find Jules's house. With Susan held in the prison as a hostage, the Doctor takes him to Jules. Once there, Lemaitre reveals that he is in fact the English spy James Stirling. In response, Ian relays Webster's message and Stirling realises that the secret assignation at an inn on the Calais Road is where the conspiracy will take place. Jules, Ian and Barbara head to the inn and overhear Barras conspire with a young general, Napoleon Bonaparte (Tony Wall), in the indictment and overthrow of Robespierre. The following day, Stirling arranges Susan's release from prison. The coup against Robespierre has begun. Stirling heads for Calais and England, while Jules and Jean lie low as they measure the future. Meanwhile, the Doctor and his companions return to the TARDIS.

== Production ==
=== Conception and writing ===
In late 1963, the eighth serial of Doctor Who was set to be titled Doctor Who and the Red Fort, a seven-part story set during the Indian Rebellion of 1857 and written by Terry Nation. However, by January 1964, little work had been done on the serial, and Nation was busy writing The Keys of Marinus. Script editor David Whitaker was later assigned to the episode, possibly about the Spanish Armada, with Gerald Blake to direct; however, this was soon scrapped, and Whitaker asked Dennis Spooner, a friend of Nation, to write an episode instead. Although Spooner was originally interested in writing a science fiction story, Whitaker was seeking a historical serial after John Lucarotti's Marco Polo and The Aztecs. Spooner was given four possible subjects, eventually deciding to focus on the French Revolution, a setting first suggested by actor William Russell. Spooner was officially commissioned by Whitaker on 2 April 1964, following Spooner's submission of a 23-page breakdown for the serial. Hungarian director Henric Hirsch was chosen to direct the serial after producer Verity Lambert saw his work on First Night, while Stanley Myers composed the serial's incidental music. Myers created 28 minutes of music for the serial, taking cues from French music such as the national anthem "La Marseillaise". The sets for The Reign of Terror were designed by Roderick Laing, who was brought in to ease the workload on regular designers Barry Newbery and Raymond Cusick, who had worked on every serial to date.

=== Characters and casting ===
Actor and lyricist James Cairncross portrayed Citizen Lemaitre, having been recommended to Hirsch by production assistant Timothy Combe, recalling his stage performances. The Conciergerie jailer was played by Jack Cunningham, who was also suggested by Combe. Spooner created the jailer character to add humour to the serial's heavy plot. Combe also recommended Neville Smith as D'Argenson and John Barrard as the shopkeeper, after working with both on Z-Cars, as well as Roy Herrick as Jean, having attended drama school together, and Tony Wall as Napoleon after seeing his theatre work. Donald Morley, cast as Jules Renan, previously performed alongside Jacqueline Hill in The Shrike, while Peter Walker, cast as the young child, featured in Hirsch's television play Bloomsday. Ronald Pickup, who played the physician, heard about the role from his friend Frank Cox, director of previous serial The Sensorites. Keith Anderson, cast as Maximilien Robespierre, had written to Hirsch prior to his casting, mentioning his appearance in an episode of Sergeant Cork.

=== Filming ===
Outdoor filming for the second episode—a first for the show—took place on 15 June 1964. Led by cameraman Peter Hamilton, a crew shot inserts of the Doctor, played by Brian Proudfoot in William Hartnell's absence, walking to Paris; Denham, Buckinghamshire was selected as the location by Combe due to the "French-looking" lanes, particularly the avenues lined with tall trees. Inserts of Russell for the second and third episodes were recorded at Ealing Studios Stage 3A from 16–17 June, in preparation for Russell's holiday. Further inserts were recorded on 18 June at Ealing Studios Stage 3.

Rehearsals for the first episode took place from 6–9 July. Hirsch had a difficult time working with Hartnell, partly because he was a foreigner, as well as his nervousness as a director. Weekly recording for the serial began on 10 July at Lime Grove Studio G. Planning for his other projects and difficulty with rehearsals led Hirsch to feel unwell, and he collapsed shortly before recording of the third episode. Lambert placed Combe in charge until a replacement director could be found; documentation indicates that John Gorrie, director of The Keys of Marinus, oversaw production of the third episode, though Gorrie has no memory of the event. Following discussions with Combe, Hartnell became more understanding towards Hirsch's situation; Hirsch returned to direct the final three episodes at the Television Centre, Studio 4, splitting some of the workload with Combe. Educational film company Gateway Films provided 80 feet of silent 35 mm footage from the film The French Revolution for the final episode.

== Reception ==
=== Broadcast and ratings ===
Episode	Title	Run time	Original release date	UK viewers (millions)	Appreciation Index
1	"A Land of Fear"	24:24	8 August 1964	6.9	58
2	"Guests of Madame Guillotine"	24:04	15 August 1964	6.9	54
3	"A Change of Identity"	25:23	22 August 1964	6.9	55
4	"The Tyrant of France"^{†}	24:46	29 August 1964	6.4	53
5	"A Bargain of Necessity"^{†}	23:51	5 September 1964	6.9	53
6	"Prisoners of Conciergerie"	25:04	12 September 1964	6.4	55

^† Episode is missing

The Reign of Terror received smaller audiences than previous serials due to the warmer weekends, but still maintained a position within the top 40 shows for the week. The first episode was broadcast on BBC1 on 8 August 1964, and was watched by 6.9 million viewers. The following two episodes maintained these figures, despite the latter's shift to the later time of 5:30pm. The fourth episode was broadcast at 5:15pm (due to coverage of the Royal Edinburgh Military Tattoo) to 6.4 million viewers, while the final two episodes again shifted to 5:30pm to 6.9 and 6.4 million viewers, respectively. The Appreciation Index dropped slightly over the six episodes: the first received 58, while the second and third received 54 and 55, respectively; the fourth and fifth episodes received 53, before rising to 55 for the final episode. The score of 53 was the lowest for the show at the time, but still considered reasonable.

The original master tapes for episodes 1, 2, 3, 5 and 6 were wiped on 17 August 1967, and the master tape for episode 4 was wiped on 31 January 1969. The telerecording prints of the serial were junked by BBC Enterprises in 1972. The sixth episode was returned to the BBC by a private collector in May 1982, and the first three episodes were located at the Cyprus Broadcasting Corporation (CyBC) in late 1984. The fourth and fifth episodes remain missing, existing only as off-air audio recordings from the original 1964 broadcast; the CyBC's copies were stored in a vault that was destroyed in a bomb attack during the 1974 Turkish invasion of Cyprus. The existing episodes were screened as part of the National Film Theatre's Bastille Day schedule on 14 July 1999, with links between the episodes by Carole Ann Ford.

=== Critical response ===
The serial was criticised for its historical inaccuracy. MMG Oborski, secretary of the Napoleon I Society, wrote that the BBC "has a certain duty to educate, or at least not to misinform children", citing the serial's fictional depiction of a meeting between Napoleon and Paul Barras to overthrow Robespierre. In response to another complaint about the English accents used in the serial in September 1964, Whitaker explained that "there is nothing worse than Frenchmen speaking in broken English to each other". Writing for the Daily Worker, Stewart Lane described the serial as a "half-baked royalist adventure".

Retrospective reviews of the serial were mixed. In The Discontinuity Guide (1995), Paul Cornell, Martin Day, and Keith Topping enjoyed the serial's dialogue and the "uncompromising nature of the story", citing the vicious soldiers, dirty cells, and off-screen murders. In The Television Companion (1998), David J. Howe and Stephen James Walker wrote that characterisation was one of Spooner's strengths as a writer, particularly praising that of Lemaitre, Robespierre, and Napoleon; they also enjoyed the production values and cast performances, noting particular praise for Anderson and Wall, though they criticised Myers's score. In A Critical History of Doctor Who (1999), John Kenneth Muir identified that later historical stories would borrow elements established in The Reign of Terror, though felt that they should have done so with The Aztecs instead. In 2008, Patrick Mulkern of Radio Times wrote positively of the humour and Hartnell's increased role, but felt that Susan was "at her weakest". In 2013, SFX's Ian Berriman felt that the serial is "really rather dull" after the first episode, noting that it assumes the audience is aware of the history of the French Revolution. Christopher Bahn of The A.V. Club stated, after a compelling beginning, the serial "[stretches] too little story over too many episodes", criticising the plot for "retreading the same basic plot".

== Commercial releases ==
The Reign of Terror
- Author: Ian Marter
- Cover artist: Tony Masero
- Series: Doctor Who book: Target novelisations
- Release number: 119
- Publisher: Target Books
- Publication date: March 1987
- ISBN: 0-491-03702-3

A novelisation of this serial, written by Ian Marter, was published in hardback by W. H. Allen in March 1987, with artwork by Tony Masero. The paperback version was published by Target Books in August 1987. An audio version of this serial was released on CD by BBC Audio in February 2006, with Ford providing linking narration and an interview. This was later included in The Lost TV Episodes: Collection 1 box set in August 2010, alongside an additional CD with interviews and original camera scripts.

The serial was released on VHS by BBC Video in November 2003, containing the four existing episodes of The Reign of Terror alongside unreleased episodes of The Faceless Ones and The Web of Fear. 2 Entertain released the serial on DVD in January 2013, with animation of the missing episodes by Theta Sigma and Big Finish Productions; the release featured several special features, including audio commentary and documentaries. Ian Jane of DVD Talk praised the detail of the animation. The Reign of Terror added to BBC iPlayer on 1 November 2023 alongside most other serials.

== Bibliography ==
- Cornell, Paul; Day, Martin; Topping, Keith (1995). The Discontinuity Guide. London: Virgin Books. ISBN 0-426-20442-5.
- Howe, David J.; Walker, Stephen James; Stammers, Mark (1994). The Handbook: The Unofficial and Unauthorised Guide to the Production of 'Doctor Who'. Vol. 1 (2016 ed.). London: Telos Publishing. ISBN 978-1-845-83941-3.
- Howe, David J.; Walker, Stephen James (1998). Doctor Who: The Television Companion: Volume 1 (2021 ed.). London: BBC Books. ISBN 978-1-845-83156-1.
- Muir, John Kenneth (1999). A Critical History of Doctor Who on Television. Jefferson, North Carolina: McFarland & Company. ISBN 978-0-786-40442-1.
- Wright, Mark, ed. (2016). "The Sensorites, The Reign of Terror and Planet of Giants". Doctor Who: The Complete History. 3 (21). London: Panini Comics, Hachette Partworks. ISSN 2057-6048.
