= Doctor Who season 1 (1963–1964) =

1963–1964 season of British TV series

Doctor Who
- Season 1
- Cover art of the Region 2 DVD release for the first serial of the season
- Starring: William Hartnell; Jacqueline Hill; William Russell; Carole Ann Ford
- No. of stories: 8
- No. of episodes: 42 (9 missing)

Release
- Original network: BBC TV / BBC1 (Note: BBC TV was renamed BBC1 midway through the season, on 20 April 1964, following the launch of BBC2.)
- Original release: 23 November 1963 – 12 September 1964

Season chronology
- Next → Season 2

The first season of the British science fiction television programme Doctor Who was originally broadcast on BBC TV between 1963 and 1964. The series began on 23 November 1963 with An Unearthly Child and ended with The Reign of Terror on 12 September 1964. The show was created by BBC Television head of drama Sydney Newman to fill the Saturday evening timeslot and appeal to both the younger and older audiences of the neighbouring programmes. Formatting of the programme was handled by Newman, head of serials Donald Wilson, writer C. E. Webber, and producer Rex Tucker. Production was overseen by the BBC's first female producer Verity Lambert and story editor David Whitaker, both of whom handled the scripts and stories.

The season introduces William Hartnell as the first incarnation of the Doctor, an alien who travels through time and space in his TARDIS, which appears to be a British police box on the outside. Carole Ann Ford is also introduced as the Doctor's granddaughter Susan Foreman, who acts as his companion alongside her schoolteachers Ian Chesterton and Barbara Wright, portrayed by William Russell and Jacqueline Hill, respectively. Throughout the season, the Doctor and his companions travel throughout history and into the future. Historical stories were intended to educate viewers about significant events in history, such as the Aztec civilisation and the French Revolution; futuristic episodes took a more subtle approach to educating viewers, such as the theme of pacifism with the Daleks.

The first eight serials were written by six writers: Whitaker, Anthony Coburn, Terry Nation, John Lucarotti, Peter R. Newman, and Dennis Spooner. Webber also co-wrote the show's first episode. The show was developed with three particular story types envisioned: past history, future technology, and alternative present; Coburn, Lucarotti, and Spooner wrote historical episodes, Nation and Newman penned futuristic stories, and Whitaker wrote a "filler" serial set entirely in the TARDIS. The serials were mostly directed by junior directors, such as Waris Hussein, John Gorrie, John Crockett, Henric Hirsch, Richard Martin, Christopher Barry, and Frank Cox; the exception is experienced director Mervyn Pinfield, who directed the first four episodes of The Sensorites. Filming started in September 1963 and lasted for approximately nine months, with weekly recording taking place mostly at Lime Grove Studios or the BBC Television Centre.

The first episode, overshadowed by the assassination of John F. Kennedy the previous day, was watched by 4.4 million viewers; the episode was repeated the following week, and the programme gained popularity with audiences, particularly with the introduction of the Daleks in the second serial, which peaked at 10.4 million viewers. The season received generally positive reviews, with praise particularly directed at the scripts and performances. However, many retrospective reviewers noted that Susan lacked character development and was generally portrayed as a damsel in distress, a criticism often echoed by Ford. Several episodes were erased by the BBC between 1967 and 1972, and only 33 of a total of 42 episodes survive; all seven episodes of Marco Polo and two episodes of The Reign of Terror remain missing. The existing serials received several VHS and DVD releases as well as tie-in novels.

== Cast and characters ==
- William Hartnell as the First Doctor, the original incarnation of the Doctor, a Time Lord who travels the universe in a time travelling spaceship called the TARDIS with companions. The First Doctor is irascible and prickly, though he becomes closer to his companions throughout the season. He is eccentric, dressing in an Edwardian-style costume, and possesses an academic interest in human history and a general aversion to violence.
- William Russell as Ian Chesterton, a science teacher at Coal Hill School. He is the more action-orientated figure, performing physical tasks in place of the Doctor. Ian is strong-willed, often acting angrily or feigning violence to instil his liberal worldview in others. He criticises the Doctor's habit of approaching dangerous situations out of curiosity, instead preferring to stay loyal to those around him and keep them out of harm's way.
- Jacqueline Hill as Barbara Wright, a history teacher at Coal Hill School. She is sensible, practical, and opinionated, and her insightful historical knowledge proves useful when travelling to the past. Her assertiveness and ethics often clash with the Doctor's authority and short-sightedness, while her empathetic humanism and pacifism are occasionally incompatible with some civilisations.
- Carole Ann Ford as Susan Foreman, the Doctor's teenage granddaughter and his original companion. She is an anachronism—an alien from the future who does not fit in at her school, possessing advanced knowledge of history and science beyond her peers. She is often immature and frequently expresses fear and panic at stressful situations, but occasionally displays her otherworldliness, such as telepathic abilities. Throughout the season, her immaturity develops into self-discovery.

== Serials ==
No. story	No. in season	Serial title	Episode titles	Directed by	Written by	Original release date	Prod. code	UK viewers (millions)	AI
1	1	An Unearthly Child	"An Unearthly Child"	Waris Hussein	Anthony Coburn and C. E. Webber (uncredited)	23 November 1963	A	4.4	63
1	1	An Unearthly Child	"The Cave of Skulls"	Waris Hussein	Anthony Coburn	30 November 1963	A	5.9	59
1	1	An Unearthly Child	"The Forest of Fear"	Waris Hussein	Anthony Coburn	7 December 1963	A	6.9	56
1	1	An Unearthly Child	"The Firemaker"	Waris Hussein	Anthony Coburn	14 December 1963	A	6.4	55
Schoolteachers Ian Chesterton and Barbara Wright are concerned about one of their pupils, Susan Foreman. When they visit her address to investigate, they encounter a police box and hear Susan's voice inside. An old man arrives, but refuses to let the teachers inside the police box; when they enter, they discover it is much bigger on the inside. Susan explains that the object is a time and space machine called the TARDIS and the old man is her grandfather, the Doctor. Refusing to let Ian and Barbara leave, the Doctor sets the TARDIS in flight and ends up in the Stone Age. After exiting the TARDIS, tribe man Kal witnesses the Doctor light a match and takes back to the tribe; Ian, Barbara, and Susan intervene, but the group is imprisoned in a large cave. Kal says they will be sacrificed if they do not make fire. While Ian tries to start a fire, Kal enters the cave and attacks the leader Za, but is killed. Ian gives a burning torch to Za, who shows it to the tribe and is declared leader. The group flee to the TARDIS and escape through time and space to a silent and unknown forest.
2	2	The Daleks	"The Dead Planet"	Christopher Barry	Terry Nation	21 December 1963	B	6.9	59
2	2	The Daleks	"The Survivors"	Christopher Barry	Terry Nation	28 December 1963	B	6.4	58
2	2	The Daleks	"The Escape"	Richard Martin	Terry Nation	4 January 1964	B	8.9	63
2	2	The Daleks	"The Ambush"	Christopher Barry	Terry Nation	11 January 1964	B	9.9	63
2	2	The Daleks	"The Expedition"	Christopher Barry	Terry Nation	18 January 1964	B	9.9	63
2	2	The Daleks	"The Ordeal"	Richard Martin	Terry Nation	25 January 1964	B	10.4	63
2	2	The Daleks	"The Rescue"	Richard Martin	Terry Nation	1 February 1964	B	10.4	65
The TARDIS lands in a petrified jungle, where they find an advanced city and decide to explore it. Barbara becomes separated from her colleagues, threatened by an unseen creature. Before long, the entire crew is captured by the Daleks, and learn they are in the middle of a war between the Daleks and the pacifistic Thals. Susan attempts to broker peace between the two groups, and while it appears to work, the Daleks eventually betray the Thals, opening fire on them at what was supposed to be a peaceful exchange of food. The Daleks conclude that they need radiation to survive and decide to bombard the atmosphere with more radiation. In order to save them from the Daleks, the TARDIS crew convinces the Thals of the importance of aggression and warfare, and manages to lead the Thals in a successful attack against the Daleks. At the end, it is believed the Dalek race has been destroyed when their power supply is knocked out. The TARDIS crew leave Skaro, but an explosion in the TARDIS knocks them out.
3	3	The Edge of Destruction	"The Edge of Destruction"	Richard Martin	David Whitaker	8 February 1964	C	10.4	61
3	3	The Edge of Destruction	"The Brink of Disaster"	Frank Cox	David Whitaker	15 February 1964	C	9.9	60
The Doctor, while attempting to correct the TARDIS's faulty navigation circuits, causes a small explosion. The Doctor, Barbara, Ian, and Susan are all temporarily rendered unconscious. After they awake, Ian and Susan appear to have slight cases of amnesia and everyone begins to act strangely. Gradually it becomes clear that the strange events are an attempt by the TARDIS itself to warn the crew that something is wrong. Barbara's clue gathering forces the Doctor to trace the problem to a broken spring in the Fast Return Switch. The malfunction is causing the TARDIS to head back to the beginning of time; the strange events were just attempts by the TARDIS to warn the passengers before the ship is destroyed. Fixing the switch brings all back to normal.
4	4	Marco Polo	"The Roof of the World"^{†}	Waris Hussein	John Lucarotti	22 February 1964	D	9.4	63
4	4	Marco Polo	"The Singing Sands"^{†}	Waris Hussein	John Lucarotti	29 February 1964	D	9.4	62
4	4	Marco Polo	"Five Hundred Eyes"^{†}	Waris Hussein	John Lucarotti	7 March 1964	D	9.4	62
4	4	Marco Polo	"The Wall of Lies"^{†}	John Crockett	John Lucarotti	14 March 1964	D	9.9	60
4	4	Marco Polo	"Rider from Shang-Tu"^{†}	Waris Hussein	John Lucarotti	21 March 1964	D	9.4	59
4	4	Marco Polo	"Mighty Kublai Khan"^{†}	Waris Hussein	John Lucarotti	28 March 1964	D	8.4	59
4	4	Marco Polo	"Assassin at Peking"^{†}	Waris Hussein	John Lucarotti	4 April 1964	D	10.4	59
The TARDIS crew lands in the Pamir Mountains of the Himalayas in 1289, their ship badly damaged, and are picked up by Marco Polo's caravan on its way along the fabled Silk Road to see the Emperor Kublai Khan. The TARDIS crew attempt to thwart the machinations of Tegana, who attempts to sabotage the caravan along its travels through the Pamir Plateau and across the treacherous Gobi Desert, and ultimately to assassinate Kublai Khan in Peking, at the height of his imperial power. The Doctor and his companions also attempt to regain the TARDIS, which Marco Polo has taken to give to Kublai Khan in effort to regain the Emperor's good graces. Susan gets the TARDIS key from Ping-Cho but is captured by Tegana before they can depart. They are finally able to thwart Tegana, who kills himself, and, in doing so, regain the Emperor's respect for Marco Polo, who allows them to depart.
5	5	The Keys of Marinus	"The Sea of Death"	John Gorrie	Terry Nation	11 April 1964	E	9.9	62
5	5	The Keys of Marinus	"The Velvet Web"	John Gorrie	Terry Nation	18 April 1964	E	9.4	60
5	5	The Keys of Marinus	"The Screaming Jungle"	John Gorrie	Terry Nation	25 April 1964	E	9.9	61
5	5	The Keys of Marinus	"The Snows of Terror"	John Gorrie	Terry Nation	2 May 1964	E	10.4	60
5	5	The Keys of Marinus	"Sentence of Death"	John Gorrie	Terry Nation	9 May 1964	E	7.9	61
5	5	The Keys of Marinus	"The Keys of Marinus"	John Gorrie	Terry Nation	16 May 1964	E	6.9	63
After arriving on an island of glass surrounded by a sea of acid, the TARDIS crew are forced to find and retrieve the five keys of Marinus. Each key is scattered across the island and must not come into the wrong hands of the Yartek and Voord Warriors. After collecting the keys from a variety of cities and settings, the travellers return to the island, where the inhabitants have been held prisoner by Yartek and the four keys are seized. The Doctor frees the prisoners and unmasks the Voord. Ian gives Yartek a false key found in the screaming jungle; when Yartek places the key in the Conscience, the machine explodes and he is killed along with the occupying Voord. The Doctor, Susan, Ian and Barbara flee the tower with Altos and Sabetha before the growing blaze overtakes the ancient structure.
6	6	The Aztecs	"The Temple of Evil"	John Crockett	John Lucarotti	23 May 1964	F	7.4	62
6	6	The Aztecs	"The Warriors of Death"	John Crockett	John Lucarotti	30 May 1964	F	7.4	62
6	6	The Aztecs	"The Bride of Sacrifice"	John Crockett	John Lucarotti	6 June 1964	F	7.9	57
6	6	The Aztecs	"The Day of Darkness"	John Crockett	John Lucarotti	13 June 1964	F	7.4	58
The TARDIS crew arrive in Mexico in the 15th century. With the TARDIS trapped in a tomb, Barbara is mistaken for a female reincarnation of the ancient high priest Yetaxa, and assumes her guise and identity. From her new position of power, Barbara sees her chance to bring an end to human sacrifice. Ian has been compelled into the military and fights the strongest warrior, Ixta, to prove his ability to command the Aztec forces. Cameca helps the Doctor and Ian find a way to re-enter the tomb by a secret entrance. Ian braves a treacherous tunnel in which he is almost drowned to re-enter the tomb by a secret door and soon tells his friends that they can flee. Despite her efforts, Barbara realises that she cannot change an entire culture. Autloc helps Barbara reunite with her friends. In a pitched battle to gain access to the tomb door, Ian kills Ixta in a fight to the death to protect the TARDIS crew, who leave knowing that despite their intervention, history will take its pre-destined course. As they depart, Tlotoxl is very much in control and sacrifices the Perfect Victim to end the naturally-occurring eclipse.
7	7	The Sensorites	"Strangers in Space"	Mervyn Pinfield	Peter R. Newman	20 June 1964	G	7.9	59
7	7	The Sensorites	"The Unwilling Warriors"	Mervyn Pinfield	Peter R. Newman	27 June 1964	G	6.9	59
7	7	The Sensorites	"Hidden Danger"	Mervyn Pinfield	Peter R. Newman	11 July 1964	G	7.4	56
7	7	The Sensorites	"A Race Against Death"	Mervyn Pinfield	Peter R. Newman	18 July 1964	G	5.5	60
7	7	The Sensorites	"Kidnap"	Frank Cox	Peter R. Newman	25 July 1964	G	6.9	57
7	7	The Sensorites	"A Desperate Venture"	Frank Cox	Peter R. Newman	1 August 1964	G	6.9	57
The TARDIS travellers land on a spaceship and find a crew on an exploration mission from Earth orbiting Sense-Sphere. Its inhabitants, the Sensorites, refuse to let them leave the orbit. The Sensorites ask the crew to board Sense-Sphere and reveal that a previous Earth expedition caused them great misery. On their journey to Sense-Sphere, the party learns that the previous visitors from Earth exploited Sense-Sphere for its wealth. Some of the Sensorite Council believe the humans can help with the disease currently killing many Sensorites. The Doctor discovers and removes deadly nightshade from the aqueduct, the cause of the poisoning. Ian and the Doctor discover that monsters in the aqueduct were actually the survivors of the previous Earth mission, and they had been poisoning the Sensorites. Their deranged Commander leads them to the surface, where they are arrested by the Sensorites. The Doctor and his party return to the city, pleading clemency for the poisoners. The leader of the Sensorites agrees and sends them back.
8	8	The Reign of Terror	"A Land of Fear"	Henric Hirsch (Note: Though Hirsch was credited, he did not direct the third episode. Documentation indicates that John Gorrie was director, but he has no memory of it.)	Dennis Spooner	8 August 1964	H	6.9	58
8	8	The Reign of Terror	"Guests of Madame Guillotine"	Henric Hirsch	Dennis Spooner	15 August 1964	H	6.9	54
8	8	The Reign of Terror	"A Change of Identity"	Henric Hirsch	Dennis Spooner	22 August 1964	H	6.9	55
8	8	The Reign of Terror	"The Tyrant of France"^{†}	Henric Hirsch	Dennis Spooner	29 August 1964	H	6.4	53
8	8	The Reign of Terror	"A Bargain of Necessity"^{†}	Henric Hirsch	Dennis Spooner	5 September 1964	H	6.9	53
8	8	The Reign of Terror	"Prisoners of Conciergerie"	Henric Hirsch	Dennis Spooner	12 September 1964	H	6.4	55
The TARDIS crew arrive outside Paris in 18th-century France. Ian, Barbara, and Susan are captured and taken to Paris to be guillotined. Ian's cellmate tells him that there is an English spy highly placed in the French Government, who is now being recalled to England. Barbara and Susan are rescued and taken to a safe house, where they are told that they will be smuggled out of France through an escape chain. Ian escapes his cell and finds Barbara and Susan. The Doctor reaches Paris and imitates a Regional Officer of the Provinces, and stays in the prison overnight. Barbara and Susan are later captured and taken to the prison, where they find the Doctor. The Doctor leads the Conciergerie to the English spy, where Ian relays a message revealing where a conspiracy against Maximilien Robespierre will take place. The spy arranges Susan's release from prison. The coup against Robespierre has begun. The spy heads for Calais and England. Meanwhile, the Doctor and his companions return to the TARDIS.

^† Episode is missing

== Production ==
=== Conception ===
In March 1963, BBC Television's Controller of Programmes Donald Baverstock informed Head of Drama Sydney Newman of a gap in the schedule on Saturday evenings between the sports showcase Grandstand and the pop music programme Juke Box Jury. Baverstock figured that the programme should appeal to three audiences: children who had previously been accustomed to the timeslot, the teenage audience of Juke Box Jury, and the adult sports fan audience of Grandstand. Newman decided that a science fiction programme should fill the gap. Head of Serials Donald Wilson and writer C. E. Webber contributed heavily to the formatting of the programme, and co-wrote the programme's first format document with Newman; the latter conceived the idea of a time machine larger on the inside than the outside, as well as the central character of the mysterious "Doctor", and the show's name Doctor Who. (Note: Hugh David, an actor initially considered for the role of the Doctor and later a director on the programme, later claimed that Rex Tucker coined the title Doctor Who. Tucker claimed that it was Newman who had done so.) Production was initiated several months later and handed to producer Verity Lambert and story editor David Whitaker to oversee, after a brief period when the show had been handled by a "caretaker" producer, Rex Tucker.

=== Casting ===
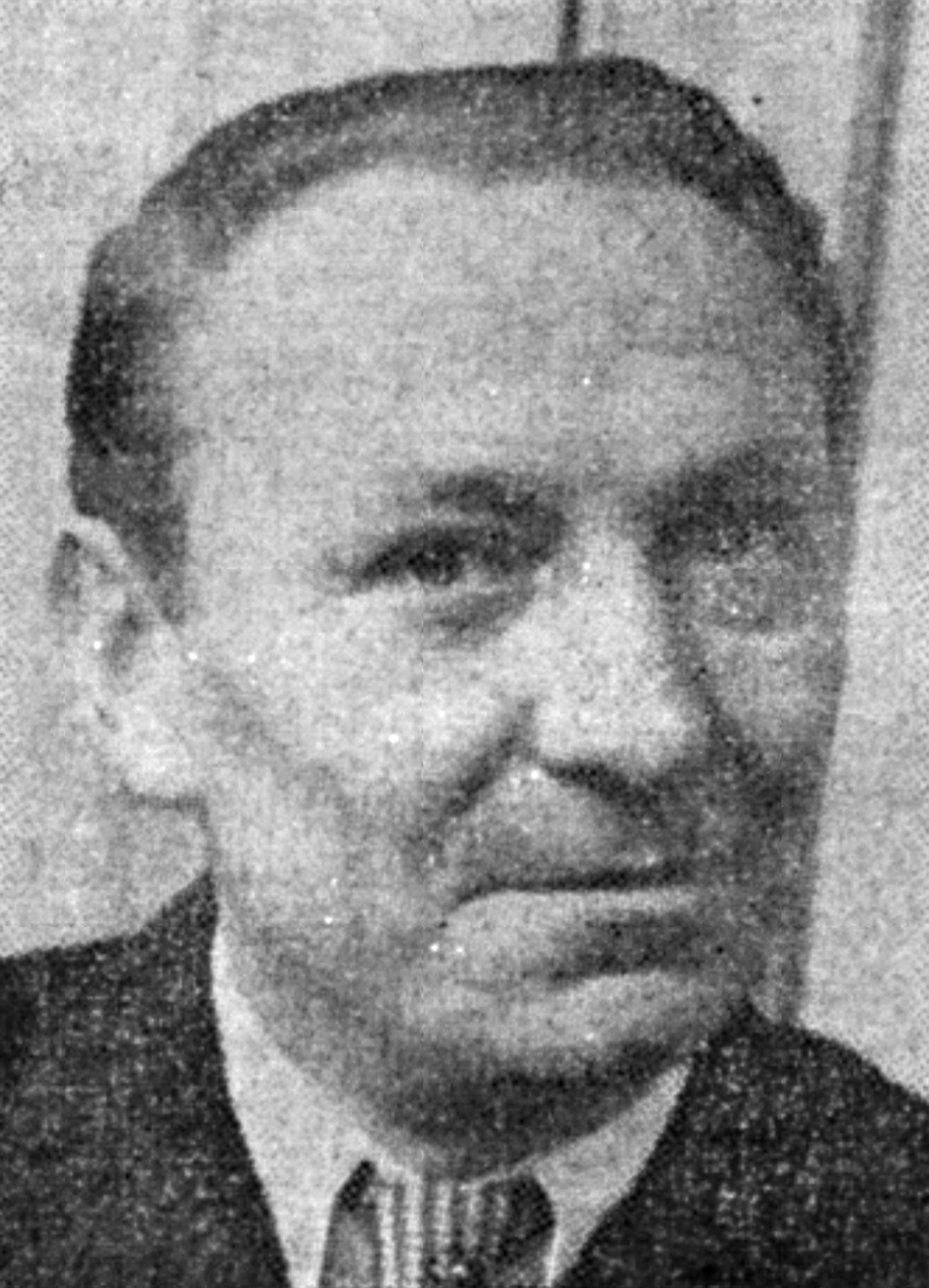
William Hartnell, 1946

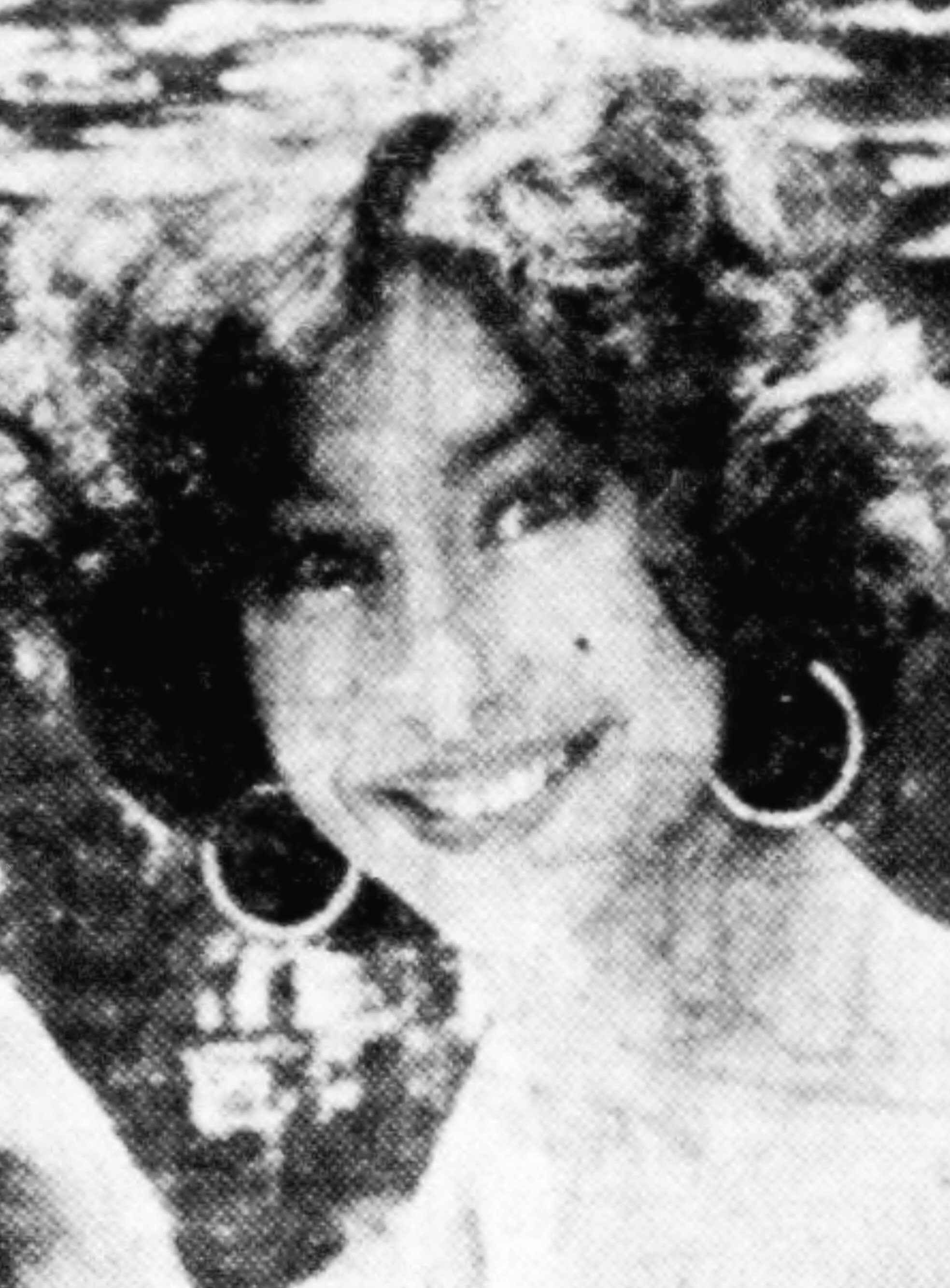
Carole Ann Ford, 1963

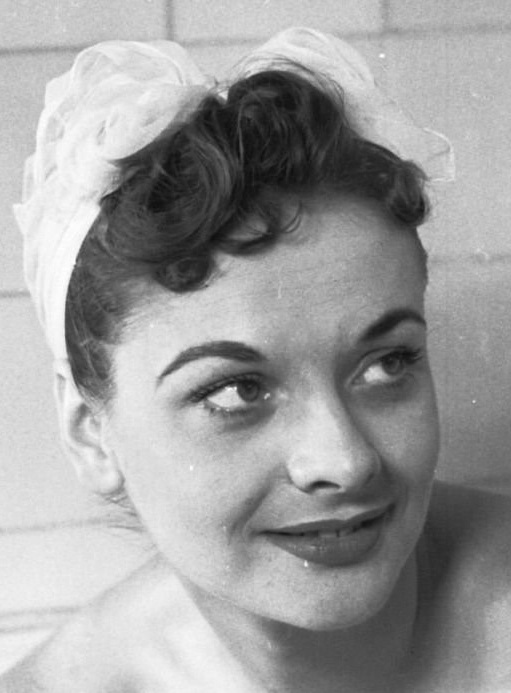
Jacqueline Hill, 1953

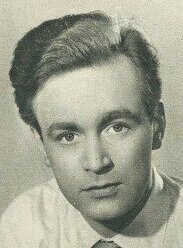
William Russell, 1953

Hartnell, Ford, Hill, and Russell were cast as the four leading roles: the Doctor, his granddaughter Susan Foreman, and her teachers Barbara Wright and Ian Chesterton, respectively.

William Hartnell portrayed the first incarnation of the Doctor (referred to as "Dr. Who") in this season. The role was originally offered to Hugh David, Leslie French, Cyril Cusack, Alan Webb and Geoffrey Bayldon; David, Cusack and Webb turned down the role as they were reluctant to work on a series, while Bayldon wished to avoid another "old man" role. Lambert and director Waris Hussein invited Hartnell to play the role; he accepted after several discussions, viewing it as an opportunity to take his career in a new direction. Hartnell had always wished to play an older character in his work, but failed to do so, becoming typecast as a "tough" actor due to his roles in Carry On Sergeant (1958) and The Army Game (1957–61). Although portrayed as grumpy and antagonistic in early episodes, the Doctor warms to his companions as the show progresses.

The Doctor's granddaughter Susan Foreman was portrayed by Carole Ann Ford, a 23-year-old who typically played younger roles. Lambert was originally in talks with actress Jacqueline Lenya for the role, and several actresses auditioned for the part, including Christa Bergmann, Anne Castaldini, Maureen Crombie, Heather Fleming, Camilla Hasse, Waveney Lee, Anna Palk and Anneke Wills. Ford felt that the character of Susan deteriorated throughout the series; although the show's initial pitch depicted Susan as a strange alien creature, she often played the damsel in distress role, panicking at minor events. Susan's school teachers Ian Chesterton and Barbara Wright were played by William Russell and Jacqueline Hill, respectively. Russell was the only actor considered by Lambert for the role of Chesterton. While Sally Home, Phyllida Law and Penelope Lee were considered for Barbara, Lambert chose Hill, her friend, for the role.

=== Writing ===
Three particular story types were envisioned for the show: history of the past, technology in the future, and alternatives of the present. Historical stories were intended to educate viewers about significant events in history, such as the Aztec civilisation and the French Revolution; futuristic episodes took a more subtle approach to educating viewers, such as the theme of pacifism in The Daleks.

The programme was originally intended to open with a serial entitled The Giants, written by Webber, but was scrapped by June 1963 as the technical requirements of the storyline—which involved the leading characters being drastically reduced in size—were beyond the technical capabilities, and the story itself lacked the necessary impact for an opener. Due to the lack of scripts ready for production, the untitled second serial from Coburn was moved to first in the running order. The order change necessitated rewriting the opening episode of Coburn's script to include some introductory elements of Webber's script for the first episode of The Giants. Coburn also made several significant original contributions to the opening episode, most notably that the Doctor's time machine should resemble a police box, an idea he conceived after seeing a real police box while walking near his office.

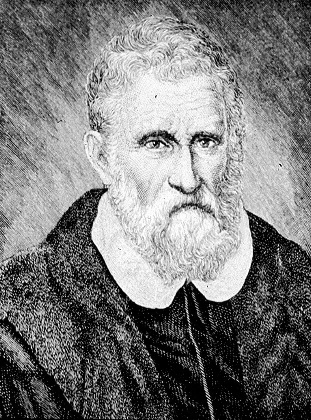
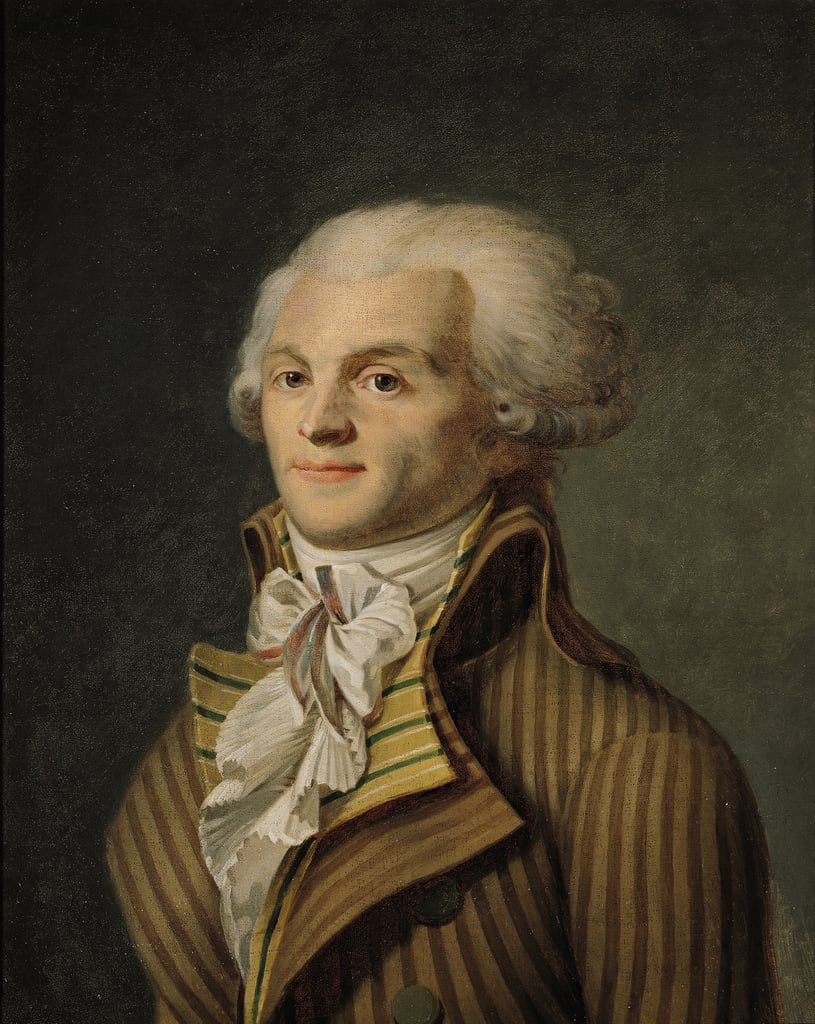
Some of the first season's stories feature historical figures such as Marco Polo (left) and Maximilien Robespierre (right).

The second serial of Doctor Who was always planned to be futuristic due to the historical nature of the first. Comedy writer Terry Nation had written a 26-page outline for a story entitled The Survivors at his home, influenced by the threat of racial extermination by the Nazis and the concerns of advanced warfare, as well as taking influences from H. G. Wells' novel The Time Machine (1895). Newman and Wilson were unhappy with the serial, having wanted to avoid featuring "bug-eyed monsters"; however, with no other scripts prepared, they were forced to accept the serial for production. Due to other sudden commitments, Nation quickly wrote the scripts for the serial at the rate of one per day. Nation also wrote the show's fifth serial, The Keys of Marinus, to replace Dr Who and the Hidden Planet by Malcolm Hulke, which was deemed problematic and required rewrites. Nation and Whitaker decided to base the serial around a series of "mini-adventures", each with a different setting and cast; Nation was intrigued by the idea of the TARDIS crew searching for parts of a puzzle. Nation was also set to write the show's eighth serial, Doctor Who and the Red Fort, a seven-part story set during the Indian Rebellion of 1857, but other commitments prevented him from doing so.

Newman suggested writer John Lucarotti to the production team during the show's early development. Lucarotti, who had recently worked on the 18-part radio serial The Three Journeys of Marco Polo (1955), penned a seven-part serial about the Italian merchant and explorer Marco Polo titled Dr Who and a Journey to Cathay. Later known as Marco Polo, the serial was moved from its placement in the running order to accommodate The Edge of Destruction. Lucarotti was approached to write The Aztecs while Marco Polo was in production. Having lived in Mexico, Lucarotti was fascinated by the Aztec civilisation and their obsession with human sacrifice. The show's eighth serial, The Reign of Terror, is also a historical story, though writer Dennis Spooner was initially interested in writing a science fiction story. Whitaker gave Spooner four possible historical subjects, and he ultimately selected the French Revolution.

The show's third serial, The Edge of Destruction, was written as a "filler" in case the show was not renewed beyond 13 episodes. Since the serial had no budget and minimal resources, Whitaker took the opportunity to develop an idea conceived during the show's formative weeks: a character-driven story exploring the facets of the TARDIS. He wrote the script in two days, drawing upon influences of ghost stories and haunted houses. Peter R. Newman wrote the show's sixth serial, The Sensorites, inspired by 1950s films set during World War II that explore the notion of soldiers who continued to fight after the war.

=== Filming ===
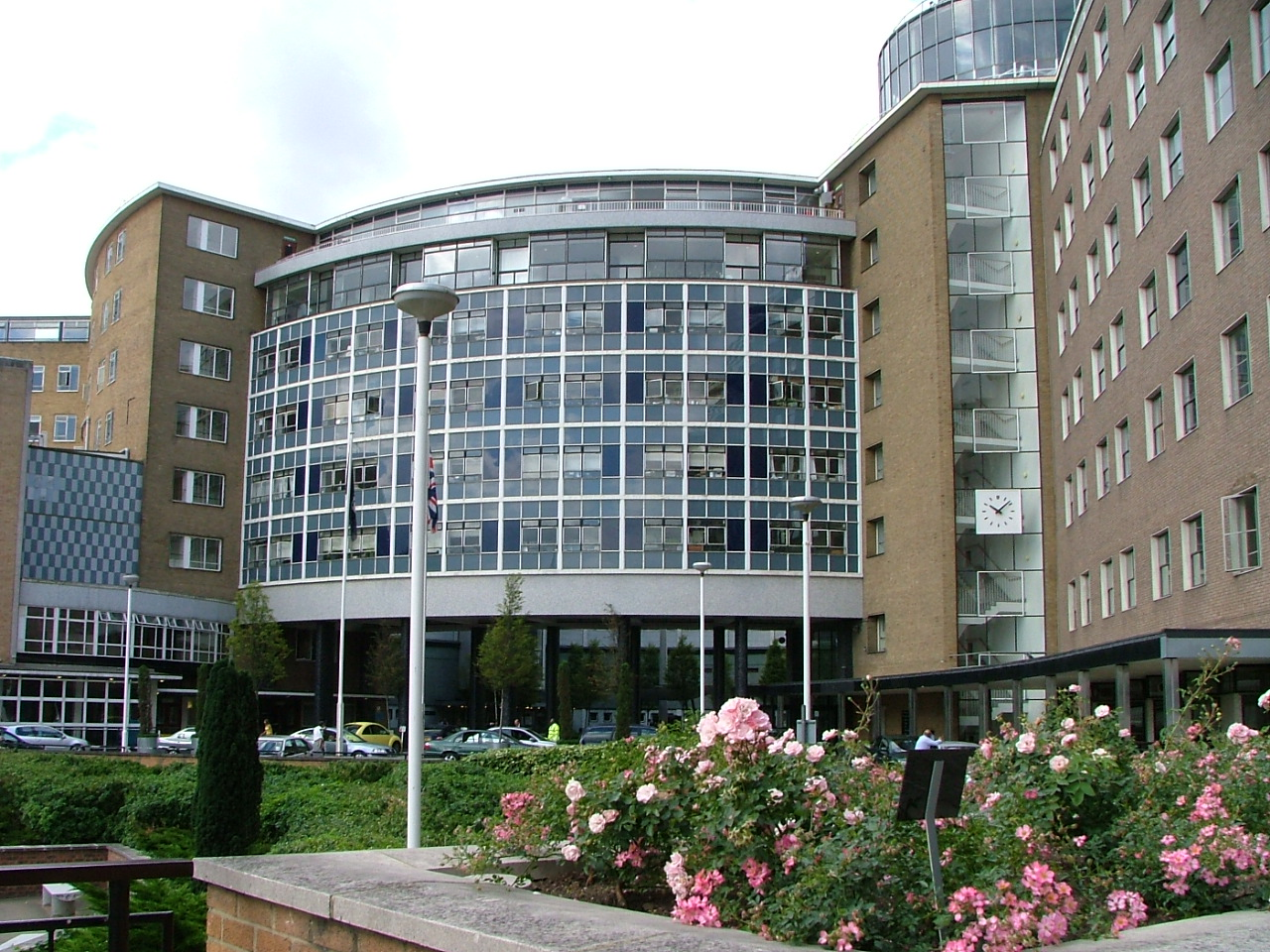
BBC Television Centre in 2005

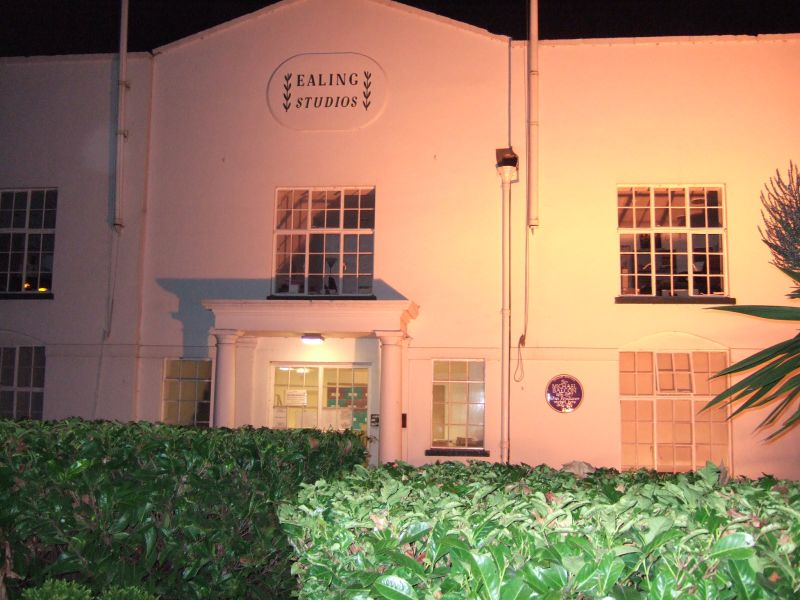
Ealing Studios in 2008

Some episodes of the first season were recorded at the Television Centre, and most inserts were filmed at Ealing Studios.

An Unearthly Child was provisionally scheduled to begin recording on 5 July, but was delayed to 19 July. Production was later deferred for a further two weeks while scripts were prepared. The show's pilot recording was finally scheduled for 27 September and regular episodes made from 18 October. Tucker was originally selected as the serial's director, but the task was assigned to Hussein due to Tucker's unavailability after the rearranging of production dates. Some of the pre-filmed inserts for the serial, shot at Ealing Studios in September and October 1963, were directed by Hussein's production assistant Douglas Camfield. The first version of the opening episode was recorded at Lime Grove Studios on the evening of 27 September 1963, following a week of rehearsals. However, the recording was bedevilled with technical errors, including the doors leading into the TARDIS control room failing to close properly. After viewing the episode, Newman ordered that it be mounted again. During the weeks between the two tapings, changes were made to costuming, effects, performances, and scripts. (Note: The original episode, retroactively referred to as the "pilot episode", was not broadcast on television until 26 August 1991.) The second attempt at the opening episode was recorded on 18 October, with the following three episodes being recorded weekly on 25 October, 1 November and 8 November.

Tucker was initially appointed to direct The Daleks, but was later replaced by Christopher Barry. A week of shooting for The Daleks took place from 28 October, consisting mostly of inserts of the city and models. Weekly recording began on 15 November; it was later discovered that the first recording was affected by induction—an effect in which the voices from the production assistants' headphones was clearly audible. The episode was re-recorded on 6 December, pushing the weekly recordings of episodes 4–7 back by one week. The final episode was recorded on 10 January 1964. The re-recording forced Paddy Russell to forego directing The Edge of Destruction due to other commitments; junior director Richard Martin was later handed the role, and the first episode was recorded on 17 January. Frank Cox directed the second episode on 24 January, as Martin was unavailable. Filming for Marco Polo was preceded by a week of insert shooting of locations and props for the montage sequences. The serial was recorded weekly from 31 January to 13 March, directed by Hussein; John Crockett directed the fourth episode in Hussein's absence.

Weekly recording for The Keys of Marinus, directed by John Gorrie, took place from 20 March to 24 April; Hartnell was absent for the third and fourth episodes, as he was on holiday. The Aztecs, directed by Crockett, was filmed from 1 to 22 May; Ford appeared in pre-filmed inserts for the second and third episodes, shot on 13 April, due to her holiday. Experienced director Mervyn Pinfield was chosen to direct the first four episodes of The Sensorites, while Cox directed the final two episodes. Recording took place from 29 March to 3 July; Hill was absent for the fourth and fifth episodes due to her holiday. The Reign of Terror featured the show's first outdoor filming in Denham, Buckinghamshire, led by cameraman Peter Hamilton on 15 June 1964. Hungarian director Henric Hirsch directed the serial, which was recorded from 10 July to 19 August; in preparation for his holiday, William Russell recorded inserts for the second and third episodes from 16–17 June. Hirsch collapsed during the filming of the third episode. Lambert placed production assistant Tim Combe in charge until a replacement director could be found; documentation indicates that Gorrie oversaw production of the third episode, though Gorrie has no memory of the event. Hirsch returned to direct the final three episodes, splitting some of the workload with Combe.

== Release ==
=== Promotion ===
Doctor Who was announced as a year-long series by Controller of BBC Television Stuart Hood on 12 September 1963, described by Television Mail as "a serial of stories to entertain the whole family". Trade newspaper Kinematograph Weekly devoted its TV column to the show on 24 October; journalist Tony Gruner described the show as "a somewhat mysterious type of programme consisting in part of fantasy and realism". A trailer for the show was broadcast on the BBC on 16 November. The first serial was given a half-page preview in Radio Times on 21 November, outlining the show's main characters and upcoming settings. On the same day, the main cast and production team attended the show's launch at Room 222 of the BBC's Broadcasting House. Hartnell hosted a radio trailer for the show on the BBC Light Programme. The BBC Home Service programme Today hosted a one-minute piece about the show's "space music" on 22 November, and a second trailer for the show was screened on BBC in the evening.

Hartnell taped a radio interview for Northern View on 17 December to promote the show's second serial. To increase the profile of the Daleks, the BBC sent two Dalek models—operated by Kevin Manser and Robert Jewell—to interact with the public at the Shepherd's Bush Market on 23 December. Hartnell recorded an appearance for Junior Points of View on 8 January, broadcast the following day, at Television Centre Presentation Studio A. In character as the Doctor, Hartnell spoke about the Daleks, based on dialogue written by Nation. A promotional image of Marco Polo was featured on the cover of Radio Times on 20 February 1964, with a half-page introduction to the serial inside. The Voord creatures from The Keys of Marinus were featured in several stories the Daily Express and Daily Mail in April 1964, while the titular creatures from The Sensorites were featured in similar press pieces in June. Lucarotti provided a syndicated interview with the press regarding The Aztecs, published in various papers such as the North-Western Evening Mail on 9 May. On 20 June, Ford opened the East Ham Town Show at the Central Park in East Ham, with 20,000 people in attendance. Radio Times ran a half-page interview with Hartnell on 16 July to promote the fourth episode of The Sensorites.

=== Broadcast ===
The first episode of An Unearthly Child was transmitted on BBC TV at 5:16 p.m. on Saturday 23 November 1963; the following three episodes were transmitted at 5:15 p.m. over the next three weeks. The serial has been repeated twice on the BBC: on BBC Two in November 1981 as part of the repeat season The Five Faces of Doctor Who, and on BBC Four as part of the show's 50th anniversary on 21 November 2013. The Daleks was broadcast across seven weeks from 21 December 1963 to 1 February 1964, and has been repeated twice on the BBC: the final episode was broadcast on BBC Two late in the evening on 13 November 1999 as part of "Doctor Who Night"; and the serial was shown in three blocks from 5–9 April 2008 on BBC Four, as part of a celebration of the life and work of Lambert following her death in November 2007. A 75-minute colourised version of the serial is set to air on BBC Four on 23 November 2023, to celebrate Doctor Who's 60th anniversary, featuring new sound design and a score by Mark Ayres.

The Edge of Destruction was transmitted across two weeks, from 8 to 15 February 1964, and Marco Polo was broadcast over seven weeks from 22 February to 4 April. From the sixth episode of Marco Polo, the show's broadcast time was pushed a further fifteen minutes, from 5:15 p.m. to 5:30 p.m., overlapping with competitor programme ITV News. Marco Polo was erased by the BBC on 17 August 1967; the entire serial is missing as a result. It is one of three stories of which no footage whatsoever is known to have survived, though tele-snaps (images of the show during transmission, photographed from a television) of episodes 1–3 and 5–7 exist, and were subsequently released with the original audio soundtrack, which was recorded "off air" during the original transmission. The Keys of Marinus was transmitted across six weeks from 11 April to 16 May; the third episode became the first Doctor Who episode to be transmitted on BBC1, following its renaming from BBC TV due to the launch of BBC2, and the show's broadcast time returned to its original slot of 5:15 p.m. from the fifth episode. The Aztecs was broadcast weekly from 23 May to 13 June.

The first two episodes of The Sensorites were broadcast on 20 and 27 June; the second episode aired 25 minutes late due to an overrun of the previous programme Summer Grandstand. Due to extended coverage of the Wimbledon tennis championships and Ashes Test match on 4 July, the third episode was replaced by Juke Box Jury and postponed to the following week. The final three episodes were broadcast weekly from 18 July to 1 August; episodes 3–5 were erased by the BBC on 17 August 1967, while the remaining three were erased on 31 January 1969. BBC Enterprises retained negatives of the original 16 mm film with soundtracks made in 1967; these were returned to the BBC Archives in 1978. The Reign of Terror was transmitted weekly from 8 August to 12 September; the second and third episodes were shifted to the later time of 5:30 p.m., the fourth episode was broadcast at 5:15 p.m. (due to coverage of the Royal Edinburgh Military Tattoo), and the final two episodes again shifted to 5:30 p.m. The original prints of The Reign of Terror were wiped by BBC Enterprises in 1972. The sixth episode was returned to the BBC by a private collector in May 1982, and the first three episodes were located in Cyprus in late 1984; the fourth and fifth episodes remain missing, existing only as off-air recordings from 1964. The existing episodes were screened as part of the National Film Theatre's Bastille Day schedule on 14 July 1999, with links between the episodes by Ford.

=== Home media ===
==== VHS releases ====
Season	Story no.	Serial name	Duration	Release date		
Season	Story no.	Serial name	Duration	UK	Australia	USA / Canada
1	1	An Unearthly Child	4 × 25 min.	5 February 1990	July 1990	January 1991
1	1	An Unearthly Child (remastered)	4 × 25 min.	4 September 2000	October 2000	—N/a
1	2	The Daleks	7 × 25 min.	5 June 1989	December 1989	October 1993
1	2	The Daleks (remastered)	7 × 25 min.	26 February 2001	April 2001	—N/a
1	3	The Edge of Destruction (Note: Also includes pilot episode of An Unearthly Child)	2 × 25 min. 1 × 30 min	May 2000	May 2000	10 October 2000 (Note: Includes The Missing Years)
1	5	The Keys of Marinus	6 × 25 min.	March 1999	May 1999	July 1999
1	6	The Aztecs	4 × 25 min.	November 1992	February 1993	18 May 1994
1	7	The Sensorites	6 × 25 min.	4 November 2002 (Note: Part of The First Doctor: Special Edition Box Set)	December 2002	7 October 2003
1	8	The Reign of Terror (Note: Also includes The Faceless Ones episodes 1 and 3, and The Web of Fear episode 1)	4 × 25 min.	24 November 2003	December 2003	7 October 2003

==== DVD and Blu-ray releases ====
All releases are for DVD unless otherwise indicated:

- ^{(D)} indicates a DVD release for a specific date
- ^{(B)} indicates a Blu-ray release

Season	Story no.	Serial name	Duration	Release date		
Season	Story no.	Serial name	Duration	R2 / UK	R4 / AU	R1 / US
1	1–4	An Unearthly Child; The Daleks; The Edge of Destruction; Marco Polo (condensed reconstruction)	13 × 25 min. 1 × 30 min.	30 January 2006	2 March 2006	28 March 2006
1	2	The Daleks in Colour	1 × 75 min. 7 × 25 min.	12 February 2024 ^{(D,B)}	4 September 2024 ^{(D,B)}	19 March 2024 ^{(D,B)}
1	5	The Keys of Marinus	6 × 25 min.	21 September 2009	7 January 2010	5 January 2010
1	6	The Aztecs	4 × 25 min.	7 October 2002	2 December 2002	4 March 2003

=== Books ===
Season	Story no.	Library no. (Note: Number in Target's Doctor Who Library, if applicable)	Novelisation title	Author	Hardcover release date (Note: Published by Target's parent companies (Allen Wingate, W. H. Allen, BBC Books) unless otherwise indicated)	Paperback release date (Note: Published by Target Books (or by BBC Books under the Target Collection umbrella) unless otherwise indicated)	Audiobook	
Season	Story no.	Library no.	Novelisation title	Author	Hardcover release date	Paperback release date	Release date (Note: Unabridged from BBC Audio / AudioGo unless otherwise indicated)	Narrator
1	001	68	Doctor Who and An Unearthly Child	Terrance Dicks	15 October 1981		—N/a	
1	001	—N/a	An Unearthly Child (Note: This audiobook was originally scheduled to be released in November 2013 but the release was cancelled due to AudioGo's bankruptcy. Rights issues are preventing its release.)	Nigel Robinson	—N/a			William Russell
1	002	—N/a	Doctor Who in an Exciting Adventure with the Daleks	David Whitaker	12 November 1964 (Note: Published by Frederick Muller Ltd.)	4 October 1965 (Note: Published by Armada Books)	—N/a	
1	002	16	Doctor Who and the Daleks	David Whitaker	23 June 1975 (Note: Published by White Lion)	2 May 1973	7 March 2005	William Russell
1	003	132	The Edge of Destruction	Nigel Robinson	19 May 1988	20 October 1988	31 August 2010	William Russell
1	004	94	Marco Polo	John Lucarotti	13 December 1984	11 April 1985	6 December 2018	Zienia Merton
1	005	38	Doctor Who and the Keys of Marinus	Philip Hinchcliffe	21 August 1980		1 September 2022	Jamie Glover
1	006	88	The Aztecs	John Lucarotti	21 June 1984	20 September 1984	2 August 2012	William Russell
1	007	118	The Sensorites	Nigel Robinson	19 February 1987	16 July 1987	3 May 2012	William Russell
1	008	119	The Reign of Terror	Ian Marter	19 March 1987	20 August 1987	2 June 2022	Jamie Glover

== Reception ==
=== Ratings ===
Viewers per episode (millions)
Audience measurement performed by Broadcasters' Audience Research Board

The assassination of John F. Kennedy the day preceding the launch of Doctor Who overshadowed the first episode; as a result, it was repeated a week later, on 30 November, preceding the second episode. The first episode was watched by 4.4 million viewers (9.1% of the viewing audience), and it received a score of 63 on the Appreciation Index; the repeat of the first episode reached a larger audience of six million viewers. Across its four episodes, An Unearthly Child was watched by an average of 6 million (12.3% of potential viewers). Mark Bould suggests that a disappointing audience reaction and high production costs prompted the BBC's chief of programmes to cancel the series until the Daleks, introduced in the second serial, were immediately popular with viewers. The first two episodes of The Daleks received 6.9 and 6.4 million viewers, respectively. By the third episode, news about the Daleks had spread, and the episode was watched by 8.9 million viewers. An additional million viewers watched for the following two weeks, and the final two episodes reached 10.4 million; by the end of the serial, the show's overall audience had increased by 50%. The following two serials retained these high viewing figures, with The Edge of Destruction receiving 10.4 and 9.9 million viewers, and Marco Polo maintaining an average of 9.47 million viewers.

The fourth episode of The Keys of Marinus received 10.4 million viewers, but saw a drop of 2.5 million viewers the following week, and an additional drop of one million for the sixth episode. The drop in viewers for the sixth episode was attributed to the absence of Juke Box Jury, the programme that followed Doctor Who. The Aztecs maintained these figures, with an average of 7.5 million viewers across the four episodes; the third episode became the first episode of the show to place in the top 20 of the BBC's audience measurement charts. (Note: The measurement for the same period by TAM (Television Audience Measurement) did not include the episode in the top 20, though the disparity between the two measurement systems was frequently debated at the time.) The fourth and fifth episodes of The Sensorites dropped to 5.5 and 6.9 million viewers, respectively, but were nonetheless the highest-rated BBC show in the BBC North region for their respective weeks. The Reign of Terror received smaller audiences than previous serials due to the warmer weekends, with an average of around 6.7 million viewers, but still maintained a position within the top 40 shows for the week.

=== Critical response ===
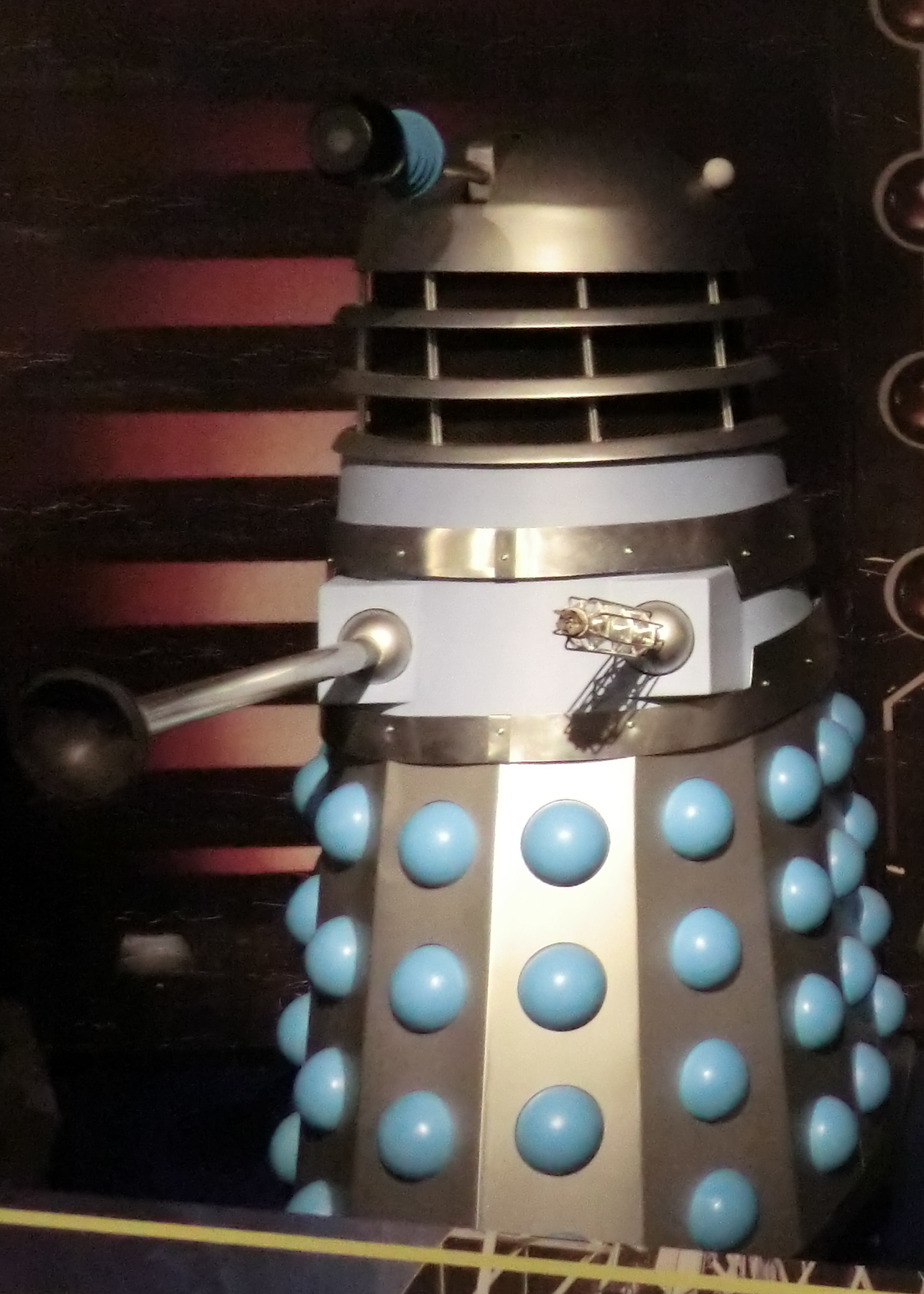
The Daleks, introduced in the show's second serial, became a cultural phenomenon and are considered the show's most iconic villains.

Doctor Who's first season received generally positive responses. For An Unearthly Child, Variety felt that the script "suffered from a glibness of characterisations which didn't carry the burden of belief", but praised the "effective camerawork", noting that the show "will impress if it decides to establish a firm base in realism". Mary Crozier of The Guardian was unimpressed by the first serial, stating that it "has fallen off badly soon after getting underway". Conversely, Marjorie Norris of Television Today commented that if the show "keeps up the high standard of the first two episodes it will capture a much wider audience". The following serial, The Daleks, was widely praised, described by the Daily Mirror's Richard Sear as "splendid children's stuff". The serial's villains, the Daleks, became a cultural phenomenon, and have been closely associated with the show since. The Edge of Destruction was criticised at a BBC Programme Review Board Meeting in February 1964 by controller of television programmes Stuart Hood, who felt that the serial's sequences in which Susan uses scissors as a weapon "digressed from the code of violence in programmes"; Lambert apologised for the scenes.

Marco Polo was positively received; Philip Purser of The Sunday Telegraph noted that Mark Eden impersonated Marco Polo "with sartorial dash", but felt that the main characters were poorly written, describing Barbara as "a persistent drip". The Keys of Marinus was criticised by Bob Leeson of the Daily Worker, who felt that the fifth episode of the serial was the show's low point, noting that the introduction of a trial scene represented a rushed script. The following serial, The Aztecs, received high praise and is retrospectively seen as one of the show's greatest stories. Television Today's Bill Edmunds praised the serial's villains, but felt that Barbara should have "a chance to look beautiful instead of worried", and Leeson of the Daily Worker felt that the serial had "charm", applauding the "painstaking attempts for historical accuracy" and noting a "much tighter plot" than previous serials. The Reign of Terror was criticised for its historical inaccuracies, described by Daily Worker's Stewart Lane as a "half-baked royalist adventure".

Retrospective reviews of the season were positive. Kimberley Piece of Geek Girl Authority felt that, while the season started slowly, it "managed to find its footing" and "developed quickly into a popular ratings favorite". Simbasible found that most serials are memorable, though many feature repetitive and "silly" storytelling. Richard Gray of The Reel Bits praised the imagination and perseverance of the show's producers. Reviewing the first serial in 2008, Radio Times reviewer Patrick Mulkern praised the casting of Hartnell, the "moody" direction and the "thrilling" race back to the TARDIS. For The Daleks, Mulkern praised the strength of Nation's scripts, particularly the first three cliffhangers, but felt that "the urgency and claustrophobia dissipate towards the end", describing the final battle as "a disappointingly limp affair". Reviewing The Edge of Destruction, Mulkern described David Whitaker as "a master of dialogue, characterisation and atmosphere", but felt he struggled with plot logic, as evidenced by the fast return switch explanation.

Mark Braxton of Radio Times praised Marco Polo, stating that "the historical landscape was rarely mapped with such poetry and elegance", though noted inconsistencies in the foreign characters' accents. Mulkern wrote that "standards slip appreciably" in The Keys of Marinus, and Arnold T. Blumberg of IGN described the serial as "a clichéd premise ... handled poorly and with no spark at all apart from Hartnell's late-hour rally". Christopher Bahn of The A.V. Club described The Aztecs as "a classical tragedy infused with just enough hope toward the end to keep it from being unbearably bleak", and Ian Berriman of SFX described the serial as "Jacqueline Hill's finest hour". DVD Talk's John Sinnott considered The Sensorites "well constructed" with impressive set design and an expanded role for Susan, but felt that there was "nothing special" about the serial. Mulkern wrote positively of the humour and Hartnell's increased role in The Reign of Terror, but felt that Susan was "at her weakest".

== Bibliography ==
- Ainsworth, John, ed. (2015). "100,000 BC and The Mutants (aka The Daleks)". Doctor Who: The Complete History. 1 (4). London: Panini Comics, Hachette Partworks. ISSN 2057-6048.
- Ainsworth, John, ed. (2016). "Inside the Spaceship, Marco Polo, The Keys of Marinus and The Aztecs". Doctor Who: The Complete History. 2 (32). London: Panini Comics, Hachette Partworks. ISSN 2057-6048.
- Bould, Mark (2008). "Science Fiction Television in the United Kingdom". In J.P. Telotte (ed.). The Essential Science Fiction Television Reader. University Press of Kentucky. ISBN 978-0-8131-2492-6.
- Chapman, James (2006). Inside the Tardis: The Worlds of Doctor Who. I.B.Tauris. ISBN 1-84511-162-1.
- Frankel, Valerie Estelle (2018). Women in Doctor Who: Damsels, Feminists and Monsters. Jefferson: McFarland & Company. ISBN 978-1-493-00016-6.
- Howe, David J.; Walker, Stephen James; Stammers, Mark (1994). The Handbook: The Unofficial and Unauthorised Guide to the Production of 'Doctor Who'. Vol. 1 (2016 ed.). London: Telos Publishing. ISBN 978-1-845-83941-3.
- Loborik, Jason; Gibson, Annabel; Laing, Moray; Grange, Emma (2014). Doctor Who Character Encyclopedia (Updated ed.). Dorling Kindersley. ISBN 978-0-241-18222-2.
- Lofficier, Jean-Marc (1989). The Doctor Who Programme Guide. Target Books. ISBN 0-426-20342-9.
- Muir, John Kenneth (1999). A Critical History of Doctor Who on Television. Jefferson, North Carolina: McFarland & Company. ISBN 978-0-786-40442-1.
- Smith, Paul MC (July 2021). Based on the Popular BBC Television Serial. Wonderful Books.
- Turner, Joan Frances (13 November 2012). "I'm From the TARDIS and I'm Here to Help You: Barbara Wright and the Limits of Intervention". In Stanish, Deborah; Myles, L.M. (eds.). Chicks Unravel Time: Women Journey Through Every Season of Doctor Who. Mad Norwegian Press. pp. 71–81. ISBN 978-1-935-23412-8.
- Wright, Mark, ed. (2016). "The Sensorites, The Reign of Terror and Planet of Giants". Doctor Who: The Complete History. 3 (21). London: Panini Comics, Hachette Partworks. ISSN 2057-6048.
