= The Edge of Destruction =

003 – The Edge of Destruction
- Doctor Who serial
- Susan Foreman threatens to attack Ian Chesterton with a pair of scissors. The scene drew criticism for its violence, for which producer Verity Lambert apologised.

Cast
- Doctor: William Hartnell – First Doctor
- Companions: William Russell – Ian Chesterton; Jacqueline Hill – Barbara Wright; Carole Ann Ford – Susan Foreman

Production
- Directed by: Richard Martin (episode 1); Frank Cox (episode 2)
- Written by: David Whitaker
- Script editor: David Whitaker (Note: Whitaker's role as story editor was uncredited to avoid complication with the Writers' Guild, as he had also written the serial.)
- Produced by: Verity Lambert
- Music by: None (Note: Stock music used in this serial was composed by Eric Siday, Alan Langford, Desmond Leslie, and Buxton Orr.)
- Production code: C
- Series: Season 1
- Running time: 2 episodes, 25 minutes each
- First broadcast: 8 February 1964
- Last broadcast: 15 February 1964

Chronology
← Preceded by The Daleks	Followed by → Marco Polo

The Edge of Destruction (also referred to as Inside the Spaceship) is the third serial of the British science fiction television series Doctor Who. It was written by David Whitaker, and first broadcast on BBC TV in two weekly parts on 8 February and 15 February 1964. The first episode was directed by Richard Martin, while Frank Cox directed the second. In the story, the Doctor (William Hartnell), his granddaughter Susan (Carole Ann Ford), and her teachers Ian Chesterton (William Russell) and Barbara Wright (Jacqueline Hill) are in the Doctor's time and space machine the TARDIS when it appears to be taken over by an outside force. The travellers begin acting strangely and turn against each other.

The serial was commissioned as a "filler", in case the show was not renewed beyond the approved 13 weeks. Whitaker wrote the scripts in two days, based on an idea he had developed during the show's formative weeks; he sought to explore the characters in more depth, as well as the facets of the TARDIS. The serial's original director, Paddy Russell, left the project due to other commitments. The serial premiered with ten million viewers, maintaining the figures from the previous story, and received generally positive responses. The BBC Programme Board voiced concerns regarding a scene in which Susan uses scissors as a weapon, noting that it violated code. The serial received print adaptations, as well as home media releases.

== Plot ==
The First Doctor (William Hartnell), while attempting to correct the TARDIS's faulty navigation circuits, causes a small explosion. The Doctor, Barbara Wright (Jacqueline Hill), Ian Chesterton (William Russell), and Susan Foreman (Carole Ann Ford) are all temporarily rendered unconscious. When they wake, Ian and Susan appear to have slight cases of amnesia and everyone begins to act strangely. The travellers are becoming suspicious of each other's motives, and the Doctor accuses Ian and Barbara of sabotage. Fearing that they have been taken over by some alien force—or that they have intentionally sabotaged the TARDIS to force the Doctor to return them to 1963—he drugs Barbara and Ian, unknowing that Ian is also suspicious and has not taken the drink given to him. The Doctor attempts to explore the problem without interference.

Gradually it becomes clear that the strange events are an attempt by the TARDIS itself to warn the crew that something is wrong. Barbara's clue gathering forces the Doctor to trace the problem to a broken spring in the Fast Return Switch. The malfunction is causing the TARDIS to head back to the beginning of time; the strange events were just attempts by the TARDIS to warn the passengers before the ship is destroyed. Fixing the switch brings all back to normal. Although the day is saved, Barbara is still affected by the Doctor's harsh words earlier. The Doctor admits he was wrong about Barbara and Ian. The story closes with the TARDIS materialising on a snowy landscape, where Susan spots a giant footprint in the snow.

== Production ==
=== Conception and writing ===
On 16 October 1963, BBC TV's Controller of Programmes Donald Baverstock indicated that Doctor Who was only confirmed as a 13-episode show at the time, due to budgetary information. There were already several serials planned at this point, namely the four-part Doctor Who and the Tribe of Gum (later An Unearthly Child), followed by the seven-part The Mutants (later The Daleks), and the seven-part A Journey to Cathay (later Marco Polo); as a result, a new two-episode "filler" serial was required, in case the show was not renewed further. On 1 November, the serial was assigned to story editor David Whitaker to write, and Paddy Russell to direct. Since the serial had no budget and minimal resources, Whitaker took the opportunity to develop an idea conceived during the show's formative weeks: a character-driven story exploring the facets of the TARDIS.

Whitaker wrote the script in two days, describing the process as "a bit of a nightmare". He drew upon influences of ghost stories and haunted houses, and producer Verity Lambert felt that the story captured audiences because of the conflict between the characters. To avoid complication with the Writers' Guild, Whitaker only received a writing credit for the serial, omitting his usual credit of story editor. When filming for the serial was deferred for a week due to issues with the previous serial, Russell left the project due to other commitments, temporarily replaced by associate producer Mervyn Pinfield; junior director Richard Martin was later handed the role. Frank Cox directed the second episode, as Martin was unavailable. Raymond Cusick designed the extra rooms in the TARDIS. Brian Hodgson of the BBC Radiophonic Workshop designed the serial's sounds, while the music was selected from a range of sample mood music from library discs, due to budgetary constraints.

=== Filming ===
Rehearsals for the first episode began on 13 January 1964, and it was recorded on 17 January in Lime Grove Studios, Studio D. William Hartnell initially complained about the script due to the number of lines, while Carole Ann Ford was sceptical of the characters appearing mad without reason; conversely, Jacqueline Hill and William Russell appreciated the chance to explore their characters in more depth. The second episode's rehearsals ran from 20–23 January, and recording took place on 24 January. The serial cost a total of £1,480, far less than the £2,500 granted for each episode. The Fast Return Switch label on the TARDIS console appears to be written in felt-tip pen; Cusick guessed it was written during rehearsals as a guide, while Lambert surmised it may have been written so Hartnell could find the switch, and both agreed it was probably never intended to be seen. Ford stated she and Hartnell labelled controls on the TARDIS control panel during rehearsal, and assumed they would be blotted out before production.

== Reception ==
=== Broadcast and ratings ===
Episode	Title	Run time	Original release date	UK viewers (millions)	Appreciation Index
1	"The Edge of Destruction"	25:04	8 February 1964	10.4	61
2	"The Brink of Disaster"	22:11	15 February 1964	9.9	60

The first episode was broadcast on BBC TV 8 February 1964, and was watched by 10.4 million viewers, retaining the high viewing figures from the previous episode. The second episode's broadcast on 15 February received slightly lower ratings, with 9.9 million viewers. The two episodes received an Appreciation Index of 61 and 60, indicating positive audience response.

=== Critical response ===
At a BBC Programme Review Board Meeting in February 1964, controller of television programmes Stuart Hood felt that the serial's sequences in which Susan uses scissors as a weapon "digressed from the code of violence in programmes"; Lambert apologised for the scenes. In The Discontinuity Guide (1995), Paul Cornell, Martin Day, and Keith Topping wrote that the story "manages to flesh out the central figures at the expense of the plot". In The Television Companion (1998), David J. Howe and Stephen James Walker considered the second episode superior to the first and, noting the serial's origins as a "filler", noted that it "works remarkably well". In A Critical History of Doctor Who (1999), John Kenneth Muir praised the serial's exploration of its characters' relationships, an element that the show would eventually lose after the departure of Russell and Hill. In a 2008 review, Patrick Mulkern of Radio Times described Whitaker as "a master of dialogue, characterisation and atmosphere", but felt he struggled with plot logic, as evidenced by the fast return switch explanation. Despite this, he stated that the ending had "charm" as the TARDIS travellers began to become friends. DVD Talk's John Sinnott felt that The Edge of Destruction was the weakest of the show's first three serials, writing that it had "some good moments" but "overall it doesn't hang together quite as well" as the preceding two stories; he commented that it felt "rushed" and the resolution was a "cop-out". The serial was recommended by Charlie Jane Anders of io9 as an example of the classic series for new viewers to watch, describing it as "a quick hit ... and still just as intense as it was".

== Commercial releases ==
=== In print ===
The Edge of Destruction
- Author: Nigel Robinson
- Cover artist: Alister Pearson
- Series: Doctor Who book: Target novelisations
- Release number: 132
- Publisher: Target Books
- Publication date: 20 October 1988
- ISBN: 0-426-20327-5

A novelisation of this serial, written by Nigel Robinson, was published in hardback in May 1988, with a cover painting by Alister Pearson; the paperback was published by Target Books on 20 October 1988. Since Whitaker died before novelising his scripts, Robinson considerably expanded the serial for the book. An audiobook reading of the novelisation, narrated by William Russell, was published by BBC Audiobooks on CD on 31 August 2010.

=== Home media ===
An extract from the second episode, dubbed in Arabic, was included on the VHS release Doctor Who: The Hartnell Years in June 1991. The full story was first released on VHS in May 2000, alongside the pilot episode of An Unearthly Child. For the DVD release on 30 January 2006, the serial was released as part of Doctor Who: The Beginning alongside the preceding two stories, with several special features. An audio version of the serial, with linking narration by Ford, was released as a vinyl record by Demon Records on 2 May 2024, as part of Record Store Day. The Edge of Destruction was added to BBC iPlayer on 1 November 2023 alongside most other serials.

== Bibliography ==
- Ainsworth, John, ed. (2016). "Inside the Spaceship, Marco Polo, The Keys of Marinus and The Aztecs". Doctor Who: The Complete History. 2 (32). London: Panini Comics, Hachette Partworks. ISSN 2057-6048.
- Cornell, Paul; Day, Martin; Topping, Keith (1995). The Discontinuity Guide. London: Virgin Books. ISBN 0-426-20442-5.
- Howe, David J.; Walker, Stephen James (1998). Doctor Who: The Television Companion: Volume 1 (2021 ed.). London: BBC Books. ISBN 978-1-845-83156-1.
- Muir, John Kenneth (1999). A Critical History of Doctor Who on Television. Jefferson, North Carolina: McFarland & Company. ISBN 978-0-786-40442-1.
