= Marco Polo (Doctor Who) =

004 – Marco Polo
- Doctor Who serial
- Marco Polo, Susan, the Doctor, and Ian

Cast
- Doctor: William Hartnell – First Doctor
- Companions: William Russell – Ian Chesterton; Jacqueline Hill – Barbara Wright; Carole Ann Ford – Susan Foreman
- Others: Mark Eden – Marco Polo; Derren Nesbitt – Tegana; Zienia Merton – Ping-Cho; Martin Miller – Kublai Khan; Jimmy Gardner – Chenchu; Charles Wade – Malik; Philip Voss – Acomat; Paul Carson – Ling-Tau; Gábor Baraker – Wang-lo; Tutte Lemkow – Kuiju; Claire Davenport – Empress; Leslie Bates – Man at Lop; Michael Guest – Mongol Bandit; Peter Lawrence – Vizier; Basil Tang – Office Foreman

Production
- Directed by: Waris Hussein (1–3, 5–7); John Crockett (4)
- Written by: John Lucarotti
- Script editor: David Whitaker
- Produced by: Verity Lambert
- Music by: Tristram Cary
- Production code: D
- Series: Season 1
- Running time: 7 episodes, 25 minutes each
- Episode(s) missing: All 7 episodes
- First broadcast: 22 February 1964
- Last broadcast: 4 April 1964

Chronology
← Preceded by The Edge of Destruction	Followed by → The Keys of Marinus

Marco Polo is the fourth serial of the British science fiction television series Doctor Who. It was first broadcast on BBC TV in seven weekly parts from 22 February to 4 April 1964. It was written by John Lucarotti and directed primarily by Waris Hussein; John Crockett directed the fourth episode. In the serial, the Doctor (William Hartnell), his granddaughter Susan Foreman (Carole Ann Ford), and her teachers Ian Chesterton (William Russell) and Barbara Wright (Jacqueline Hill) meet the Italian merchant-explorer Marco Polo (Mark Eden) and Mongolian Emperor Kublai Khan (Martin Miller) in Yuan-era China in 1289.

Lucarotti—who had previously written works based on Marco Polo's adventures—was suggested to producers by Doctor Who creator Sydney Newman when the show was in early development. Throughout production, the script was rewritten to make the story more personal to Polo. Production designer Barry Newbery used several historical books for research of the old designs, taking inspiration from 1900 Korean architecture. The serial premiered with nine million viewers, and maintained audience figures throughout its seven-week run. It received generally positive responses from critics and was sold widely overseas, but was erased by the BBC in 1967; the entire serial is missing as a result. The serial received later print adaptations, and soundtrack releases using the surviving audio.

== Plot ==
The TARDIS, badly damaged, lands in the Pamir Mountains of the Himalayas in 1289, and the crew are picked up by Marco Polo's (Mark Eden) caravan on its way along the fabled Silk Road to see the Emperor Kublai Khan (Martin Miller). The story concerns the First Doctor (William Hartnell), his granddaughter Susan Foreman (Carole Ann Ford) and her teachers Ian Chesterton (William Russell) and Barbara Wright (Jacqueline Hill), and their attempts to thwart the machinations of Tegana (Derren Nesbitt), who attempts to sabotage the caravan along its travels through the Pamir Plateau and across the treacherous Gobi Desert, and ultimately to assassinate Kublai Khan in Peking, at the height of his imperial power. The Doctor and his companions also attempt to regain the TARDIS, which Marco Polo has taken to give to Kublai Khan in effort to regain the Emperor's good graces. Susan gets the TARDIS key from Ping-Cho (Zienia Merton) but is captured by Tegana before they can depart. They are finally able to thwart Tegana, who kills himself before he can be executed, restoring the Emperor's respect for Marco Polo, and the Emperor allows them to depart.

== Production ==
=== Conception and writing ===
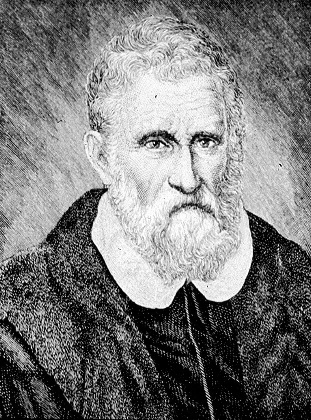
The serial features the Italian merchant and explorer Marco Polo, as well as some of his friends and associates.

Show creator Sydney Newman suggested writer John Lucarotti, an old colleague from the Canadian Broadcasting Corporation, to the production team during the show's early development. Story editor David Whitaker contacted Lucarotti to write for the programme; Lucarotti, who had recently worked on the 18-part radio serial The Three Journeys of Marco Polo (1955), was commissioned on 9 July 1963 to write a seven-part serial about Italian merchant and explorer Marco Polo, titled Dr Who and a Journey to Cathay. While developing the storyline Lucarotti struggled with the fourth episode, and used anecdotal material from Polo's memoirs, The Travels of Marco Polo, to pad out the plot. The serial was originally placed third in the show's running order, to begin broadcast on 18 January 1964, but was pushed back to fourth to accommodate the two-part "filler" serial The Edge of Destruction. Waris Hussein, who worked on the show's first serial, was selected as the director for Marco Polo; John Crockett directed the fourth episode in Hussein's absence.

Like most serials in the show's early history, the costumes for Marco Polo were designed by Daphne Dare. The serial's designer, Barry Newbery, used Aurel Stein's Ruins of Desert Cathay (1912) and Nelson Ikon Wu's Chinese and Indian Architecture (1963) for research of the 13th century designs. Newbery also found that Korean architecture from 1900 was similar to that of the 13th century. The incidental music for the serial was composed by Tristram Cary, who previously worked on The Daleks. Cary used conventional instruments for the score, including flute, harp and percussion, and he recorded electronic voices for the second episode's sandstorm scenes.

=== Casting and characters ===
Mark Eden was cast as Marco Polo; Hussein had seen Eden in the Royal Shakespeare Company's production of A Penny for a Song in 1962. While the serial's narration was originally scripted for the Doctor, Ian and Barbara, Hussein decided to make the story more personal to Polo, and the narration was rewritten for Eden. Derren Nesbitt, who had appeared in several historical film series in the 1950s, was cast as Tegana. For the role of Ping-Cho, Hussein wanted an "oriental" actress who had not appeared in the West End production of The World of Suzie Wong or the film 55 Days at Peking (1963), due to the prominence of those productions. Actress Zienia Merton auditioned at Hussein's home, and was offered the role. William Russell was unhappy with sudden rewrites minimising the role of his character, Ian Chesterton, in the serial, and his agent wrote to BBC's head of serials Donald Wilson; Wilson replied to Russell's agent, assuring that he would "be watching very carefully" to ensure the scripts "use [Russell's] talents to the maximum". The fifth episode featured an untrained spider monkey, which the cast found difficult to work with; Carole Ann Ford recalled that "it was a nasty little thing peeing all over the place and biting anyone who came near it".

=== Filming ===
A week of shooting took place at Ealing Studios from 13 to 17 January 1964, consisting mostly of inserts of locations and props for the montage sequences. Rehearsals for the first episode ran from 27 to 30 January, and the episodes were recorded weekly at Lime Grove Studio D from 31 January to 13 March. When William Hartnell became ill in the first week of February, quick rewrites were performed on the second episode to eliminate the Doctor from most scenes; Hartnell only had one line of dialogue in the episode. For the sandstorm in the second episode, a wind machine was used, with other footage superimposed on top; Hussein was unhappy with the effectiveness of the effect, later stating that "it looked like everyone's aerials had blown over". Merton recalled the wind machine blowing sawdust into her eyes, rendering her unable to see for the rest of the scene. During camera rehearsals for the sixth episode, Eden's right hand was accidentally lacerated by a dagger used by Nesbitt.

== Reception ==
=== Broadcast and ratings ===
Episode	Title	Run time	Original release date	UK viewers (millions)	Appreciation Index
1	"The Roof of the World"	24:12	22 February 1964	9.4	63
2	"The Singing Sands"	26:34	29 February 1964	9.4	62
3	"Five Hundred Eyes"	22:20	7 March 1964	9.4	62
4	"The Wall of Lies"	24:48	14 March 1964	9.9	60
5	"Rider From Shang-Tu"	23:26	21 March 1964	9.4	59
6	"Mighty Kublai Khan"	25:36	28 March 1964	8.4	59
7	"Assassin at Peking"	24:48	4 April 1964	10.4	59

The first episode was broadcast on BBC TV on 22 February 1964, and was watched by 9.4 million viewers. The following two episodes maintained the same viewing figures, rising to 9.9 million for the fourth episode, before dropping to 9.4 million for the fifth and 8.4 million for the sixth; from the sixth episode, the show's broadcast time was pushed a further fifteen minutes, from 5:15pm to 5:30pm, overlapping with competitor programme ITN News. The final episode was watched by 10.4 million viewers. The Appreciation Index dropped slightly across the seven episodes, from 63 to 59. The serial was sold widely overseas, but was erased by the BBC on 17 August 1967; the entire serial is missing as a result. It is one of three stories of which no footage whatsoever is known to have survived, though tele-snaps (images of the show during transmission, photographed from a television) of episodes 1–3 and 5–7 exist, and were subsequently released with the original audio soundtrack, which was recorded "off air" during the original 1964 broadcast. The serial gained the attention of two sources for further development: in June 1964, Young World Publications showed interest in adapting the serial for the Super Mag comic series, but were turned down as the comic rights had been sold to TV Comic; and in July 1964, The Walt Disney Company approached the BBC for the film rights to Marco Polo, though no developments were made.

=== Critical response ===
The serial received positive reviews from television critics and viewers. Following the broadcast of the first episode, the BBC Programme Review Board noted that there were "several appreciative notes" on the show. Philip Purser of The Sunday Telegraph noted that Eden impersonated Marco Polo "with sartorial dash", but felt that the main characters were poorly written, describing Barbara as "a persistent drip". In The Discontinuity Guide (1995), Paul Cornell, Martin Day, and Keith Topping wrote that the story was "wonderful, but a little too loose and unstructured to be the all conquering classic of repute". In The Television Companion (1998), David J. Howe and Stephen James Walker described the serial as "an amazing tour de force", praising Lucarotti's scripts, dialogue, and characters, Hussein's direction, Newbery's sets, Dare's costumes, Cary's score, and the cast performances. In a 2008 review, Mark Braxton of Radio Times praised the serial, stating that "the historical landscape was rarely mapped with such poetry and elegance", though he noted inconsistencies in the foreign characters' accents. In Doctor Who: The Complete History (2016), editor John Ainsworth described the serial as "exotic and arresting", praising the simplicity of the narrative and the exploration of the characters.

== Commercial releases ==
Marco Polo
- Author: John Lucarotti
- Cover artist: David McAllister
- Series: Doctor Who book: Target novelisations
- Release number: 94
- Publisher: Target Books
- Publication date: 11 April 1985
- ISBN: 0-426-19967-7

A novelisation of this serial, written by Lucarotti based on his original scripts, was published in hardback by W. H. Allen & Co. in December 1984, with a cover painting by David McAllister; the paperback was published by Target Books in April 1985. A three-CD set of the audio soundtrack was released in November 2003, as part of the show's 40th anniversary, with linking narration by William Russell and a fold-out map of Polo's journey. This was later re-released as part of Doctor Who: The Lost TV Episodes: Collection One in August 2010 by AudioGO, along with the original camera scripts of the episodes, and released as a vinyl record by Demon Records in September 2020. An audiobook of Lucarotti's novel was released in December 2018, narrated by Zienia Merton in her final professional engagement before her death.

A condensed 30-minute reconstruction of the serial, compiled by Derek Handley using telesnaps, photographs and the off-air soundtrack recording, was released as a special feature on the DVD release of The Edge of Destruction, as part of the Doctor Who: The Beginning box set, on 30 January 2006. The telesnaps were also published in a Doctor Who Magazine special edition, The Missing Episodes – The First Doctor, in March 2013. Charles Norton, director of several animated reconstructions, noted in 2019 that an animated version of Marco Polo was unlikely in the near future due to the significant resources required, such as costumes and characters.

== Bibliography ==
- Ainsworth, John, ed. (2016). "Inside the Spaceship, Marco Polo, The Keys of Marinus and The Aztecs". Doctor Who: The Complete History. 2 (32). London: Panini Comics, Hachette Partworks. ISSN 2057-6048.
- Cornell, Paul; Day, Martin; Topping, Keith (1995). The Discontinuity Guide. London: Virgin Books. ISBN 0-426-20442-5.
- Howe, David J.; Walker, Stephen James (1998). Doctor Who: The Television Companion. Vol. 1 (2021 ed.). London: BBC Books. ISBN 978-1-845-83156-1.
