= Beyond the Sun =

Beyond the Sun may refer to:

- Beyond the Sun (novel), a 1997 novel based on the TV series Doctor Who, adapted as an audio play
- Beyond the Sun (album), a 2011 Chris Isaak double-album
- Beyond the Sun (film), a 1975 Argentine film
- The Daleks (working title: Beyond the Sun), a 1963-4 Doctor Who serial
- The Edge of Destruction (alternate title: Beyond the Sun), a 1964 Doctor Who serial
- The Hidden Planet or Beyond the Sun, an unmade Doctor Who serial
- "Beyond the Sun", a song by Amebix from Arise! (2000 reissue)
- "Beyond the Sun", a song by Shinedown from Us and Them
- Beyond the Sun (board game), a 2020 board game by Rio Grande Games
