= Henric Hirsch =

Romanian director (1923–1999)

- Born: Henrich Hirsch; 13 November 1923; Cluj, Romania
- Died: March 1999 (aged 75); Camden, London, England
- Occupations: Director, actor, translator
- Years active: 19??–1974
- Spouse: Sandra Ruth Geissler (m. 1977)

Henric Hirsch (13 November 1923 – March 1999) was a Hungarian-Romanian theatre and television director.

== Early life ==
Born of Jewish descent, Hirsch initially worked as a jeweller when he applied for naturalisation to live in Palestine in 1947. Sometime later, he became an experienced theatre director in Hungary but fled to England to seek refuge following the Hungarian Revolution of 1956. There, he continued to direct for theatre but sought to move into television. After completing the BBC's directors' course, his first assignment was directing a 1964 edition of the TV anthology series First Night.

== TV work and Doctor Who ==
This was seen by producer Verity Lambert, who in turn offered Hirsch the opportunity to direct Doctor Who Season 1 finale The Reign of Terror (after the intended director Gerald Blake was unable to commit). The experience was not a pleasant one for Hirsch. His background being in the theatre, he struggled, finding the production more gruelling than his previous TV work, not being particularly interested in the material he had to work with and having difficulties forging good working relationships with the cast members, in particular leading actor William Hartnell. This led to Hirsch falling ill and being found collapsed from nervous exhaustion outside the studio before episode 3 was due to be filmed. Production assistant Timothy Combe was placed in charge until a replacement director could be found; documentation indicates that John Gorrie oversaw production of the third episode, though Gorrie has no memory of the event. It has even been debated whether Mervyn Pinfield in fact directed the third instalment. Hirsch recovered to direct episodes 4–6, where he found the production smoother and tensions eased between him and Hartnell.

Overall, as a result of this bad experience, Hirsch left the BBC and returned to work in the theatre. However, he would direct TV plays for anthology series such as The Wednesday Play and Theatre 625 as well as ITV shows including episodes of soap operas Crossroads and Emmerdale Farm in 1973 (the former also in 1974). In addition, he tried his hand at acting, appearing in a 1966 instalment of The Spies.

== Theatre work and translations ==
As a translator, Hirsch translated Ion Luca Caragiale's The Carnival Story from Romanian into English, first performed by the Webber Douglas Academy of Dramatic Art in 1969, the production of which he also directed. Working as an assistant to theatre director Frank Hauser, Hirsch helped to translate Ferenc Molnár's comedy The Wolf into English. This production starred Edward Woodward, Judi Dench and Leo McKern and initially began at the Oxford Playhouse in 1973 before transferring to the Apollo Theatre, Queen's Theatre and New London Theatre.

By the mid-1970s Hirsch appears to have retired from theatre and TV, with no further credits after this period. From 1976, he spent the next two decades dividing his time between the United Kingdom and Australia where his wife was from.
