= Gordon Wales (disambiguation) =

Gordon Wales may refer to:

- Gordon Wales (actor) (1929–2023), see The Keys of Marinus
- Gordon Wales, fictional character from Dynasty
