= The Keys of Marinus =

005 – The Keys of Marinus
- Doctor Who serial
- The Doctor (William Hartnell) speaks to the judge in the serial's penultimate episode. While Hartnell's performance received praise, critics noted that the introduction of the trial represented a rushed script.

Cast
- Doctor: William Hartnell – First Doctor
- Companions: William Russell – Ian Chesterton; Jacqueline Hill – Barbara Wright; Carole Ann Ford – Susan Foreman
- Others: George Coulouris – Arbitan; Martin Cort – Voord / Warrior / Aydan; Peter Stenson – Voord / Ice Soldier / Second Judge; Gordon Wales – Voord; Robin Phillips – Altos; Katharine Schofield – Sabetha; Heron Carvic – Voice of Morpho; Edmund Warwick – Darrius; Francis de Wolff – Vasor; Michael Allaby – Ice Soldier / Larn; Alan James – Ice Soldier / First Judge / Guard; Anthony Verner – Ice Soldier; Henley Thomas – Tarron; Raf De La Torre – Senior Judge; Fiona Walker – Kala; Donald Pickering – Eyesen; Stephen Dartnell – Yartek

Production
- Directed by: John Gorrie
- Written by: Terry Nation
- Script editor: David Whitaker
- Produced by: Verity Lambert
- Music by: Norman Kay
- Production code: E
- Series: Season 1
- Running time: 6 episodes, 25 minutes each
- First broadcast: 11 April 1964
- Last broadcast: 16 May 1964

Chronology
← Preceded by Marco Polo	Followed by → The Aztecs

The Keys of Marinus is the fifth serial of the British science fiction television series Doctor Who, which was first broadcast on BBC TV/BBC1 in six weekly parts from 11 April to 16 May 1964. Written by Terry Nation and directed by John Gorrie, the serial takes on a "mini-adventures" format, in which the First Doctor (William Hartnell), his granddaughter Susan Foreman (Carole Ann Ford), and her teachers Ian Chesterton (William Russell), and Barbara Wright (Jacqueline Hill) search for four keys to restore the Conscience of Marinus, a computer which maintains law and order. The group travel to two cities, a jungle, and an icy wasteland in search of the keys.

The Keys of Marinus was written to replace a different script which was deemed problematic. When commissioned to write the script, Nation was intrigued by the idea of the TARDIS crew searching for pieces of a puzzle; he and script editor David Whitaker decided to construct the serial around a series of "mini-adventures", each with a different setting and cast. Incidental music was composed by Norman Kay, while Raymond Cusick, Daphne Dare, and Jill Summers worked as designers. The serial premiered with nine million viewers, maintaining audience figures for several weeks before seeing a significant drop from the fifth episode. Response for the serial was mixed, and it received several print adaptations and home media releases.

== Plot ==
On Marinus, the First Doctor, his granddaughter Susan Foreman, and her teachers Ian Chesterton and Barbara Wright meet Arbitan, Keeper of the Conscience of Marinus—a computer developed as a justice machine which kept law and order across the planet. Arbitan explains that Marinus society is in danger: the Voord, humanoid creatures protected by amphibian-like black rubber wetsuits, seek to take control of the Conscience. To prevent this, the Conscience requires five keys, and Arbitan coerces the Doctor and his friends to gather them. Arbitan is stabbed to death by a Voord.

The crew are impressed by the luxuries of Morphoton; however, Barbara realises they have been hypnotised and that Morphoton is actually a place of dirt and squalor. The governing creatures order Barbara's death but she hides in the city, making contact with the slave girl Sabetha. Barbara notices one of the keys around her neck. They escape and destroy the creatures, freeing the city's subjects. Another slave, Altos, remembers he was also sent by Arbitan, and he and Sabetha join the Doctor and his crew. While the Doctor continues to the City of Mellennius, the others search a dangerous jungle. Ian remains to search for the key while Sabetha and Susan continue.

Ian finds Barbara in the temple, where they retrieve the next key before teleporting to an icy wasteland. They meet Vasor, who steals their keys. Ian and Altos force him to take them to the ice caves, where they find Sabetha and Susan with mechanised Ice Soldiers, and discover the next key frozen in ice. An Ice Soldier kills Vasor and the group escapes. At Mellennius, Ian is accused of the murder of Eprin. The Doctor returns and postpones Ian's trial to gather evidence. The judges are persuaded to find Ian guilty; however, Susan is found kidnapped by the murderer's wife. The Doctor finds the final key and Ian is freed.

The travellers return to Arbitan's island, where Altos and Sabetha have been held prisoner by Yartek—Arbitan's killer—and the four keys have been seized. The Doctor frees Altos and Sabetha and unmasks the Voord. Ian gives Yartek a false key found in the jungle; when Yartek places the key in the Conscience, the machine explodes and he is killed along with the occupying Voord. The Doctor, Susan, Ian, and Barbara flee the tower with Altos and Sabetha before the growing blaze overtakes the ancient structure.

== Production ==
=== Conception and writing ===
The Keys of Marinus was written to replace a different script, Dr Who and the Hidden Planet by Malcolm Hulke, which was deemed problematic and required rewrites. The production team approached Terry Nation, writer of the second serial The Daleks, to write the serial. Nation had been due to write Doctor Who's eighth serial, The Red Fort, but had focused on other projects in the interim. Due to the quick turnaround required for the script, Nation and script editor David Whitaker decided to base the serial around a series of "mini-adventures", each with a different setting and cast; Nation was intrigued by the idea of the TARDIS crew searching for parts of a puzzle. As the first two episodes were written with mostly interior sets, Nation wanted to tell a story more "out in the open", setting the third episode in a jungle to allow the designer an opportunity for different settings. Whitaker suggested a cold snow-scape setting for the fourth episode to contrast with the hot jungle. Nation used many existing words for location and character names in the story: Marinus originated from the Latin word marinus, meaning "of the sea"; Morphoton is based on Morpheus, the Greek god of dreams; Millennius came from the term millennium, for a thousand years; and Arbitan is based on the Latin word Arbiter, meaning a judge. Producer Verity Lambert selected John Gorrie as the serial's director; even though Gorrie was unhappy with the quality of the scripts, he agreed to direct the serial to advance his career.

=== Characters and casting ===
Carole Ann Ford was displeased with the portrayal of Susan in the serial, as she felt that she was written like a child, describing her character as "pathetic". By mid-March 1964, the serial's guest cast had been finalised. Veteran actor George Coulouris was cast in the role of Arbitan; Gorrie immediately thought of Coulouris for the role while reading the script, and was delighted when he accepted the part, describing Coulouris as his "hero". Francis de Wolff was selected to play Vasor, while Donald Pickering played Eyesen. Gorrie cast Henley Thomas as Tarron; the two were old friends who had previously worked together. Robin Phillips, who was also friends with Gorrie, was cast as Altos; Gorrie felt that Phillips' handsome looks fit the role of Altos accurately. Similarly, he wanted the character of Sabetha to resemble a princess, and selected former drama student Katharine Schofield. Gorrie was impressed by the sinister voice of Heron Carvic, casting him as the Voice of Morpho, and the role of Kala was given to Fiona Walker, who had written to Gorrie for a role. For the role of the Voord, among other villains, three young actors, who were friends of Gorrie, were cast: Martin Cort, Peter Stenson, and Gordon Webster.

=== Music and design ===
The design of the Voord was based on a rubber wetsuit; their description in the scripts were vague.

Norman Kay, who had scored the show's first serial, composed the incidental music for The Keys of Marinus. The score, performed by seven musicians, was recorded in Maida Vale Studio on 7 March 1964; several standard instruments were used, including a clarinet, bass clarinet, double bass, guitar, flute, harp, piccolo, trumpet and percussion. Nineteen new sound effects were recorded for the serial by Brian Hodgson of the BBC Radiophonic Workshop, including the sounds of the Conscience of Marinus and the clocks in Millennius.

Raymond Cusick, Daphne Dare, and Jill Summers were commissioned as the designers for the serial. Nation's description of the Voord in the scripts were vague; Dare based the design on a rubber wetsuit, while the heads were created using vulcanised rubber by prop builders Jack and John Lovell. The submersible props and the Conscience machine were designed by Shawcraft Models. Cusick used leftover fibreglass to complete the design of the Conscience machine, as the budget was running low. The moving vegetation in the third episode was constructed by Design and Display Ltd. Jablite polystyrene was used to simulate snow in the third and fourth episodes. The tank-top worn by Susan in the serial was knitted by Ford's mother.

=== Filming ===
Model filming for The Keys of Marinus commenced in March 1964 at Ealing Studios. For the shots of the wolves in the fourth episode, the BBC purchased 14 feet of film from the 1957 Russian thriller Seryy razboynik (The Grey Robber) from distributor Sovexport. Rehearsals for the first episode took place from 16–19 March, and weekly recording for the serial began on 20 March in Lime Grove Studios. Gorrie found the recording days difficult, due to the complexity of the show and the small size of the studio. William Hartnell was absent from the recording of the third and fourth episodes, as he was on holiday. Ford recalled that the cast could "have a few more giggles" during rehearsals, as Hartnell's tendency to forget lines was time-consuming. The final episode was recorded on 24 April 1964. The first episode was edited on 23 March. While most episodes were edited within three hours in an evening, the second episode required two evenings, on 31 March and 2 April 1964.

== Reception ==
=== Broadcast and ratings ===
Episode	Title	Run time	Original release date	UK viewers (millions)	Appreciation Index
1	"The Sea of Death"	23:20	11 April 1964	9.9	62
2	"The Velvet Web"	25:37	18 April 1964	9.4	60
3	"The Screaming Jungle"	23:45	25 April 1964	9.9	61
4	"The Snows of Terror"	24:54	2 May 1964	10.4	60
5	"Sentence of Death"	25:03	9 May 1964	7.9	61
6	"The Keys of Marinus"	25:11	16 May 1964	6.9	63

The first episode was broadcast on BBC TV on 11 April 1964, and was watched by 9.9 million viewers, maintaining the audience from previous weeks. The following episode dropped to 9.4 million viewers, while the third returned to 9.9 million. The third episode became the first Doctor Who episode to be transmitted on BBC1, following its renaming from BBC TV due to the launch of BBC2. The fourth episode was the serial's most watched, with 10.4 million viewers, followed by a significant drop for the fifth and sixth episodes, with 7.9 million and 6.9 million viewers, respectively; from the fifth episode, the show's broadcast time returned to its original slot of 5:15pm. The drop in viewers for the sixth episode was attributed to the absence of Juke Box Jury—the programme that followed Doctor Who—which was replaced by the film Where Coco Lives. The Appreciation Index was an average of 61 for the six episodes, ranging from 60 to 63.

=== Critical response ===
The serial received mixed reviews. Bob Leeson of the Daily Worker felt that the fifth episode of the serial was the show's low point, noting that the introduction of a trial scene represented a rushed script. In The Discontinuity Guide (1995), Paul Cornell, Martin Day, and Keith Topping felt that the episodic narrative left little room for each story to develop, and that the show's limited budget was evident. In The Television Companion (1998), David J. Howe and Stephen James Walker praised Cusick's work with a limited budget, and enjoyed the serial's conclusion. In A Critical History of Doctor Who (1999), John Kenneth Muir lauded the serial's depiction of co-existing—but not strictly interconnected—cultures and the development of their world. In a 2008 review, Patrick Mulkern of Radio Times wrote that "standards slip appreciably" after the four preceding serials in terms of "ambitious but slapdash" script quality, as well as the below-par sets and supporting characters.

In 2009, Graham Kibble-White in Doctor Who Magazine derided Susan's character for "devolving into a bit of a shrill", but was generally positive towards the episodic story structure and the timing of Hartnell's holiday. Despite this, he wrote that the final two episodes "never truly engages with the tenets of courtroom drama". Elliot Thorpe of Den of Geek felt that the episodic story structure "works incredibly well" by keeping the momentum and making each episode "fresh". In 2010, DVD Talk's J. Doyle Wallis attributed the serial's weakness to the Doctor's absence, the lack of a main antagonist that would thread the episodes together, the "lacking and disparate" world of Marinus, and the "ramshackle" execution of the concept. Arnold T. Blumberg of IGN described the serial as "a clichéd premise ... handled poorly and with no spark at all apart from Hartnell's late-hour rally". He cited the poor production quality and the "hodge-podge" leaps to various locations on Marinus which were "boring if not inept".

== Commercial releases ==
Doctor Who and the Keys of Marinus
- Author: Philip Hinchcliffe
- Cover artist: David McAllister
- Series: Doctor Who book: Target novelisations
- Release number: 38
- Publisher: Target Books
- Publication date: 21 August 1980
- ISBN: 0-426-20125-6

Attempts were made to commercialise the Voord to recapture the success of Nation's Daleks. They were featured on cigarette cards in late 1964, on dry transfer sheets from Tower Press in 1965, and on the cover of—and a story in—the first Doctor Who annual book in September 1965. The Voord's success did not match the Daleks'. They later appeared in spinoff media such as Doctor Who Magazine in 1987 and Big Finish Productions, providing context left unexplored by Nation, and busts and action figures were released by Head-Up Display and Harlequin Miniatures in 1999 and 2000. Amicus Productions acquired the movie rights to The Keys of Marinus, but the project was not pursued.

A novelisation of this serial, written by Philip Hinchcliffe, was published by Target Books in August 1980, with artwork by David McAllister. The paperback version of the book was also included in The Doctor Who Gift Set in 1986. The serial was released on VHS in March 1999, and on DVD in September 2009; the latter included several special features, including audio commentary and a documentary on the sets featured in the serial. While remastering the serial for the DVD release, it was discovered that the second and fourth episodes had been slightly edited; off-air soundtracks recorded by David Holman were used to restore the cuts. Sound effects from the serial, under the title "Sleeping Machine", were included on Doctor Who: The 50th Anniversary Collection, originally released on CD in December 2013. The Keys of Marinus was added to BBC iPlayer on 1 November 2023 alongside most other serials.

== Bibliography ==
- Ainsworth, John, ed. (2016). "Inside the Spaceship, Marco Polo, The Keys of Marinus and The Aztecs". Doctor Who: The Complete History. Vol. 2, no. 32. London: Panini Comics, Hachette Partworks. ISSN 2057-6048.
- Bignell, Jonathan; O'Day, Andrew (2004). Terry Nation. Manchester University Press. ISBN 978-0-719-06547-7.
- Cornell, Paul; Day, Martin; Topping, Keith (1995). The Discontinuity Guide. London: Virgin Books. ISBN 0-426-20442-5.
- Howe, David J.; Walker, Stephen James (1998). Doctor Who: The Television Companion: Volume 1 (2021 ed.). London: BBC Books. ISBN 978-1-845-83156-1.
- Muir, John Kenneth (1999). A Critical History of Doctor Who on Television. Jefferson, North Carolina: McFarland & Company. ISBN 978-0-786-40442-1.
- Kibble-White, Graham (11 November 2009). "DVD review: The Keys of Marinus". Doctor Who Magazine. No. 414. Royal Tunbridge Wells, Kent: Panini Comics.
