= Doctor Who season 1 =

Doctor Who season 1 may refer to three different seasons of the British science fiction television programme Doctor Who:

- Doctor Who season 1, the 1963–1964 season featuring the First Doctor (William Hartnell)
- Doctor Who series 1, the 2005 series continuation featuring the Ninth Doctor (Christopher Eccleston)
- Doctor Who series 14, the 2024 series also known as "Season One" featuring the Fifteenth Doctor (Ncuti Gatwa)
