= Mervyn Pinfield =

British television producer (1912–1966)

- Born: Reginald Mervyn Pinfield; 28 February 1912; Evesham, Worcestershire, England
- Died: 20 May 1966 (aged 54); Islington, London, England
- Occupations: Television producer, television director

Reginald Mervyn Pinfield (28 February 1912 – 20 May 1966) was a British television producer and director who worked for the BBC during the 1950s and 1960s. By the time Pinfield joined the BBC to work in live drama at Alexandra Palace in the early 1950s, he was a highly experienced producer and manager. During Verity Lambert's tenure as the first producer of Doctor Who, he was the programme's associate producer (from the first episode of An Unearthly Child (1963) to The Romans (1965)).

== Early life ==
Mervyn Pinfield initially trained as an engineer. Before the war, he worked in the automobile industry in Coventry where he joined the company amateur dramatics society. He eventually resigned his position and joined the Coventry Repertory Company for theatrical training, then joining the company as a full member. For the next three years he gained acting experience till in 1939 he was appointed Producer to the Midlands Art Group. With the outbreak of war, as a trained engineer, he was posted to aircraft manufacturing, in his spare time forming a company of actors to tour and stage plays for the forces. After demobilisation, he formed his own repertory company, "The Star Players", in partnership with Ernest Pickering and Frank Pemberton.

In the summer of 1946 he joined Aurora Productions Limited in Dunfermline as Producer, and then Falkirk where a season of plays was staged. In 1946 he moved with Aurora to Cromer and Great Yarmouth where the company settled at the Little Theatre, Royal Aquarium, where he was acting producer and general manager. In 1948 he left Aurora and joined the newly formed Morecambe Repertory Theatre Limited as Producer at the Royalty Theatre. Pinfield spent 4 years with the Royalty, leaving in April 1953 having been appointed Studio Manager at the BBC TV studios in Lime Grove, and then Productions Assistant in September 1955 .

== Doctor Who ==
In 1963, he was appointed to the position of associate producer for Doctor Who to support Verity Lambert, as it was the first programme for which she was the producer. He also directed episodes one to four of The Sensorites, all four episodes of The Space Museum and episodes one and two of Planet of Giants for the series, and worked as director on other BBC series such as Compact (Day Of Deliverance and Fare Thee Well For I Must Leave Thee), The Monsters, and The Franchise Affair. (There is some debate that he might have directed episode 3 of The Reign of Terror when assigned director Henric Hirsch collapsed from nervous exhaustion. However, there are conflicting reports that John Gorrie in fact directed the episode even though he claims to have no recollection of this.)

Pinfield's engineering background held him in good stead in directing Doctor Who programmes with their complex special effects. He was also known as the inventor of an early type of teleprompter, or autocue, which he called the Piniprompter.

In 2013, as part of the programme's 50th anniversary celebrations, the BBC broadcast the docudrama An Adventure in Space and Time, which recounted the creation and early days of Doctor Who. Pinfield was portrayed by Jeff Rawle.
