= David Whitaker (screenwriter) =

English television writer and novelist (1928–1980)

- Whitaker in an image from a documentary on the DVD release of The Edge of Destruction
- Born: David Arthur Whitaker; 18 April 1928; Knebworth, Hertfordshire, England, United Kingdom
- Died: 4 February 1980 (aged 51); Fulham, London, England, UK
- Occupations: TV script editor and writer
- Years active: 1957–1973
- Known for: First Doctor Who script editor
- Spouse: June Barry

David Arthur Whitaker (18 April 1928 – 4 February 1980) was an English television writer and novelist who worked on the early years of the science-fiction TV series Doctor Who. He served as the programme's first story editor, supervising the writing of its first 51 episodes from 1963 to 1964.

== Career ==
Prior to joining the BBC, Whitaker worked as a writer, actor and director with the York Repertory Group. A play he wrote for them, A Choice of Partners (1957), gained the attention of the BBC's script department. They commissioned Whitaker to work on the series Garry Halliday and the soap opera Compact.

Whitaker was employed as the original story editor for Doctor Who, being appointed on or around 24 June 1963. He had not planned to stay longer than a year in the position, as he thought the series might not be renewed. He had therefore agreed to take up a role working on another production. After leaving the series as story editor on 31 October 1964, he contributed his own scripts for a number of Doctor Who serials, including The Crusade (1965), The Power of the Daleks (1966), The Evil of the Daleks (1967), The Enemy of the World (1967–68) and The Wheel in Space (1968, from a story concept by Kit Pedler). His final script for the show was The Ambassadors of Death (1970), although this seven-parter was heavily rewritten by others and Whitaker wrote no further than the third episode.

His other work included writing the Dalek comic strip for the weekly children's magazine TV Century 21, in addition to the stage play The Curse of the Daleks (1965).

In 1964, Whitaker published the first novelisation of a Doctor Who serial; more than 150 other such books would be published in the course of the next 30 years. His own, Doctor Who in an Exciting Adventure with the Daleks, was based on Terry Nation's script for the first Dalek TV serial. He completed a second novelisation the following year, this time based on his own script for The Crusade. Both books were originally published by Frederick Muller, with the first also being given a paperback release by Armada.

In 1973, Whitaker's novelisations (along with a third, written by Bill Strutton and based on The Web Planet) were re-issued by Target Books as part of its launch of a new series of novelisations; Whitaker's Dalek story was re-titled Doctor Who and the Daleks.

From 1966 to 1968 Whitaker was the chairman of the Writers Guild of Great Britain. He moved to Australia in the 70's and contributed to the series Homicide, The Drifter and Elephant Boy before returning to the UK.

Before his death in 1980, Whitaker had been undergoing treatment for cancer. He died leaving his novelisation of The Enemy of the World unfinished and his plans to adapt The Evil of the Daleks unrealised. The adaptation of The Enemy of the World was ultimately written by Ian Marter without using any of the material prepared by Whitaker, while The Evil of the Daleks was eventually novelised by John Peel and published in 1993.

A documentary, Finding David, is included on Doctor Who: The Collection - Season 2 Blu-ray box set paired with The Crusade and hosted by Toby Hadoke. It features a screengrab of this article.

== List of Doctor Who credits ==
=== As writer (1963–69) ===
- The Edge of Destruction
- The Rescue
- The Crusade
- The Power of the Daleks (Patrick Troughton's first serial as the Second Doctor, with uncredited script re-writes by Dennis Spooner)
- The Evil of the Daleks
- The Enemy of the World (with uncredited re-writes by Barry Letts and Derrick Sherwin)
- The Wheel in Space (from a story by Kit Pedler)
- The Ambassadors of Death (with uncredited re-writes by Terrance Dicks, Trevor Ray and Malcolm Hulke)

Although tasked with writing the serial that would later be produced as The Invasion (1968), Whitaker was ultimately unable to contribute a script, leaving then-story editor and future Doctor Who producer Derrick Sherwin to write it himself.

=== As story editor (1963–64) ===
- An Unearthly Child
- The Daleks
- The Edge of Destruction
- Marco Polo
- The Keys of Marinus
- The Aztecs
- The Sensorites
- The Reign of Terror
- Planet of Giants
- The Dalek Invasion of Earth

== Bibliography ==
- Walker, Stephen James (2006). Talkback: The Unofficial and Unauthorised Doctor Who Interview Book: Volume One: The Sixties. Telos Publishing. p. 31. ISBN 1-84583-006-7.

Preceded by position created	Doctor Who Script Editor; 1963–64	Succeeded by Dennis Spooner
