= Frank Cox (director) =

British television director (1940–2021)

- Born: Frank Dixon Cox; 28 May 1940; London, England
- Died: 27 April 2021 (aged 80)
- Occupation: Director
- Spouse: Bridget Turner (died 2014)

Frank Dixon Cox (28 May 1940 – 27 April 2021) was a British television director from the 1960s to the 1990s. He was married to actress Bridget Turner until her death in 2014.

Cox studied English at the University of Leeds from which he graduated in 1962. He did not get into the Royal Academy of Dramatic Art (RADA), but took a job as a floor assistant at the BBC. He was then offered a position on the BBC's training course for directors. Among his first assignments were three episodes of the first season of Doctor Who.

Of all the directors who worked on the 1963 to 1989 run of Doctor Who, Cox was the only one who did not direct an entire serial at some stage.

He died in April 2021 at the age of 80.

== Filmography ==
=== Director ===
- Doctor Who
  - The Edge of Destruction (Episode two - The Brink of Disaster) - 1964
  - The Sensorites (Episode five - Kidnap, and Episode six - A Desperate Venture) - 1964
- The Troubleshooters - 1965
- The First Lady - 1968
- Doomwatch - 1970
- Paul Temple
  - Catch Your Death - 1971
- The View from Daniel Pike - 1971
- Sutherland's Law - 1973
- Warship - 1973
- Play for Today
- Take the High Road - 1984, 1989–1991
  - PQ17 - 1981

Taggart - 1994

=== Producer ===
- Sutherland's Law - 1973–1976
  - The End of the Good Times - 1975
- Take the High Road - 1991–1993
- Escape - 1980
- C.A.T.S. Eyes - 1985

=== Self ===
- Over The Edge - 2006
- Inside the Spaceship - 2006
