= Ian Chesterton =

Character in the TV series Doctor Who

- Doctor Who character
- William Russell as Ian Chesterton
- First appearance: An Unearthly Child (1963)
- Last appearance: "The Power of the Doctor" (2022)
- Portrayed by: William Russell
- Duration: 1963–1965, 2022

In-universe information
- Full name: Ian Chesterton
- Species: Human
- Gender: Male
- Occupation: Science teacher
- Affiliation: First Doctor
- Spouse: Barbara Wright
- Home: Earth
- Nationality: British (English)
- Home era: 20th and 21st centuries

Ian Chesterton is a fictional character in the British science fiction television series Doctor Who and a companion of the First Doctor. He was played in the series by William Russell and was one of the members of the programme's first regular cast, appearing in much of the first two seasons from 1963 to 1965. In a film adaptation of one of the serials, Dr. Who and the Daleks (1965), he was played by Roy Castle, but with a very different personality and backstory. Ian appeared in 16 stories and 77 episodes. He later returned for a cameo appearance, played once again by Russell, in the 2022 episode "The Power of the Doctor".

== Appearances ==
=== Background ===
Ian Chesterton is a science teacher at the Coal Hill School and works with Barbara Wright, a history teacher. One of their students, Susan Foreman, the granddaughter of the Doctor, shows unusually advanced knowledge of science and history. Attempting to solve the mystery of this "unearthly child," Ian and Barbara follow Susan back home to a junkyard, where they hear her voice coming from what appears to be a police box. When they investigate further, they discover that the police box exterior hides the much larger interior of a time machine known as the TARDIS, and are whisked away on an adventure in time and space with the Doctor and Susan.

=== Character ===
Ian provides the series with an action-orientated figure, able to perform the physical tasks that the elderly Doctor cannot. The Doctor rarely calls him by his first name (Ian) as the others do but rather by his surname, Chesterton. There was also a small number of instances where William Hartnell calls him Chesterfield. His concern, above all, is for the safety of the TARDIS crew, and in the early stories he often takes issue with the Doctor's habit of placing the group in harm's way just to satisfy his own curiosity. The chemistry between Barbara and himself is also evident, although the nature of their relationship is never made explicit in the television series. Their eventual marriage is revealed in the fourth series of The Sarah Jane Adventures.

Ian shows a breadth of skills throughout his tenure with the Doctor. He manages to create fire (An Unearthly Child), rides a horse, knows how to fight with swords (The Romans) and is knowledgeable about pressure points that can paralyze an opponent (The Aztecs). He is also fiercely protective of Barbara, going on a lone mission to rescue her from Saracens in The Crusade. In that story, he is also knighted by King Richard I of England as "Sir Ian of Jaffa". After many travels, Ian and Barbara eventually use a Dalek time machine to go home, two years after their disappearance (The Chase).

The character of Ian was intended by the production team to return for a guest appearance in the 1983 Doctor Who story Mawdryn Undead, but this plan fell through when Russell proved to be unavailable. The script was modified to feature, instead, Alistair Lethbridge-Stewart as the story's schoolteacher character. However, in 1999 Russell did return to the part for the BBC Worldwide video release of The Crusade, two of the four episodes of which are missing from the archives. Russell provided linking narration between the existing episodes in character as an aged Ian Chesterton reminiscing about the events of the story.

Following his departure, Ian has been name-checked on a number of occasions in the series: He was mentioned by Vicki in episode one of The Time Meddler; by the first Doctor in episode four of The Massacre of St Bartholomew's Eve and again by his third incarnation on Spiridon in episode one of Planet of the Daleks. Ian was also mentioned in episode one of the 1993 Children In Need charity special Dimensions In Time and again in Death of the Doctor, a two-part story in the fourth series of The Sarah Jane Adventures. After meeting Jo Grant and the Eleventh Doctor, Sarah Jane Smith reveals that she has researched the lives of some of the Doctor's earth-bound companions and discovered that Ian and Barbara have married each other, become professors, live in Cambridge and are rumoured to have not aged since the 1960s. In the 50th Anniversary Special "The Day of the Doctor", the sign for Coal Hill Secondary School identifies the Chairman of the Governors as "I. Chesterton." In the spin-off series Class, it was revealed in the episode "Brave-ish Heart" that the Board of Governors had been removed when the school was refurbished as an Academy.

Russell reprised his role as Ian in the 2022 special "The Power of the Doctor" alongside several other former companions who have gathered together as a support group to talk of their experiences with the Doctor. Ian expresses surprise that the Doctor has become a woman. With this appearance, Russell achieved the Guinness World Record for the longest gap between TV appearances by an actor portraying the same character.

=== Other media ===
The novelisation of The Daleks by David Whitaker is written in first person from Ian Chesterton's perspective, and changes his initial meeting with the Doctor, Susan, and Barbara to a car accident involving the two ladies. The TARDIS then arrives on Skaro rather than prehistoric Earth, with the story continuing much as the TV serial from then on. In this version, Ian is a chemist returning from an unsuccessful job interview, but his character is otherwise unchanged.

Since 1994, the character has also appeared in various novels from Virgin Publishing and BBC Books, set between televised adventures during his particular era of the programme. One BBC Books novel, The Face of the Enemy by David A. McIntee (1998), picks up the story of Ian and Barbara, now married to each other, in the early 1970s, the two of them collaborating with the Doctor's colleagues at UNIT and his enemy the Master when Ian is hired as the Third Doctor's temporary replacement while the Doctor is taking a trip away from Earth. In this book, they have a young son named John. Many of the novels mention a 1980s pop star named Johnny Chester or Johnny Chess, intended to be the same character. Chess is idolised by the Seventh Doctor's companion Ace and has apparently been romantically involved with the Fifth Doctor's companion Tegan.

In issue #456 of The Doctor Who Magazine, the eleventh Doctor investigates strange psychic metal and finds Ian and Barbara inside, who believe they are teaching several classes for a wide range of students. In the following issues the two help the Doctor investigate a conspiracy that stretches through the years they knew 'their' Doctor and beyond. At the end of the storyline, Ian and Barbara are married, the Doctor acting as the best man.

Russell reprised his role as Ian Chesterton in a variety of audio dramas for Big Finish Productions, both Companion Chronicles featuring Ian narrating adventures during his time with the Doctor and more full-cast audios which include Russell acting as Ian and the Doctor. These audios include The Five Companions, where Ian is abducted along with other later companions to join the Fifth Doctor in another part of the Death Zone during the events of "The Five Doctors", and The Time Museum, where an elderly Ian is captured by a memory-draining entity that tries to drain his memories and use him as bait to lure the Doctor into a trap, only for Ian to turn the tables on his captor and escape. In 2020, Russell reprised the role once again, reuniting with Carole Ann Ford for a special release - Susan's War. When Susan is recruited for the Time War and given a diplomatic mission to form an alliance with the Sensorites, she requests Ian's help as an ambassador given their previous history with the species.

Jamie Glover, having portrayed William Russell in the 2013 docudrama An Adventure in Space and Time, has taken on the role of Ian Chesterton in several Big Finish productions, alongside the rest of the cast taking on the original roles of the actors they were playing. Glover has appeared as Ian in five series of Doctor Who: The First Doctor Adventures alongside David Bradley as the Doctor, Claudia Grant as Susan and Jemma Powell as Barbara, as well as an episode of The Diary of River Song.

== Film version ==
Ian Chesterton
- Dr. Who and the Daleks character
- Adapted by: Milton Subotsky
- Portrayed by: Roy Castle

In-universe information
- Species: Human
- Affiliation: Dr. Who; Barbara; Susan
- Home: Earth
- Home era: 1965
- Appears in: Dr. Who and the Daleks (1965)

In the film adaptation Dr. Who and the Daleks, Ian Chesterton is the boyfriend of Barbara, granddaughter of Dr. Who.

=== Personality ===
Played mainly for comic relief, Ian is very different from the resourceful and heroic version of the television series, being clumsy and somewhat foolish. Both versions share a great reluctance to travel - the moment they arrived on Skaro, Ian wants to go home. Susan has a low opinion of him.

=== Other media ===
==== Comics ====
The character also appears in the Dell comic strip adaptation of the film and the short story The House on Oldark Moor by Justin Richards.

In Dr Who and the House on Oldark Moor he subsequently meets an ancient Roman legion in 64 AD and ends up as a gladiator, and travels to Oldark Moor and meets Count Tarkin.
