= John Gorrie (director) =

English director and screenwriter (born 1932)

- Born: John Sumner Gorrie; 11 August 1932 (age 94); Hastings, East Sussex, England
- Occupations: Screenwriter, director

John Sumner Gorrie (born 11 August 1932) is an English director and screenwriter. He began his career as an actor, but in early 1963 he completed the BBC's directors' course. His first assignments as a director were for the soap opera Compact and the anthology series Suspense. He directed the Doctor Who serial The Keys of Marinus.

He directed episodes of Out of the Unknown, Edward the Seventh (which he also co-wrote), Play for Today, and Tales of the Unexpected. Gorrie also directed John Osborne's adaptation of Wilde's novel The Picture of Dorian Gray (1976) for the Play of the Month series.

In 1979, John Gorrie directed two classics: Shakespeare's Twelfth Night (taping dates 16–21 May, first transmitted in the UK on 6 January 1980), and The Tempest (taping dates 23–28 July, first transmitted in the UK on 27 February 1980) in the BBC Television Shakespeare project.
