= The Discontinuity Guide =

Book by Paul Cornell

- Authors: Paul Cornell, Martin Day, Keith Topping
- Cover artist: Slatter–Anderson
- Language: English
- Subject: Doctor Who
- Published: 1995
- Publisher: Virgin Books
- Publication place: United Kingdom
- Media type: Print (paperback)
- Pages: 357 (first edition)
- ISBN: 0-426-20442-5
- OCLC: 60225122

The Discontinuity Guide is a 1995 guidebook to the serials of the original run (1963–1989) of the BBC science fiction series Doctor Who. The book was written by Paul Cornell, Martin Day and Keith Topping and was first published as Doctor Who - The Discontinuity Guide on 1 July 1995 by Virgin Books.

== Contents ==
The book focuses on the fiction of Doctor Who. For each serial, the authors discuss the roots of the story, technical and narrative gaffes, technobabble, dialogue disasters and triumphs, continuity, and a "bottom line" critical analysis of the story. The book also contains short essays on subjects in Doctor Who continuity, such as the Doctor's family, the history (or histories) of the Daleks, UNIT dating and the origins of the Time Lords.

One such essay marked the first publication of the "Season 6B" theory that, from the Second Doctor's perspective, the events of "The Five Doctors" and The Two Doctors took place in a period of the Doctor's life, later wiped from his memories, after the end of The War Games but prior to his regeneration into the Third Doctor during which, rather than immediately regenerate and begin his exile on Earth, the Doctor, reunited with companions Jamie McCrimmon and Victoria Waterfield, performed various missions for the Time Lords.

== Publication history ==
The book was first published in 1995 by Doctor Who Books, an imprint of Virgin Books. At the time, Virgin held the licence to publish Doctor Who books from the BBC, and published licensed Doctor Who novels and other non-fiction books under the Doctor Who Books imprint.

The guidebook was subsequently given an un-licensed re-print as simply The Discontinuity Guide in November 2004 through MonkeyBrain Books, with a new foreword by Lou Anders. In 2013, it was published as an ebook — as The Doctor Who Discontinuity Guide — by Orion Publishing Group under its Gateway imprint.

Additionally, the BBC's Doctor Who website incorporated the book's text, along with that of Doctor Who: The Television Companion by David J. Howe and Stephen James Walker, into its classic series episode guide.

== Reception ==
Lars Pearson described The Discontinuity Guide as "a lively romp though all the show's consistencies and inconsistencies." When the book was reissued in 2004, Sfcrowsnest gave it a negative review, criticising the re-issue for not updating the volume to incorporate information about the 1996 film or the then-impending new series with Christopher Eccleston, and stating that overall "Serious 'Dr Who' fans will find the book a worthy addition to their bookshelves, but more casual readers will probably want to find a more user-friendly and attractive book or web-site instead". The SF Site gave a more mixed review, praising the book for its humour while stating that the book would probably appeal more to fans wanting to know the finer details of the serials but that more casual fans would not enjoy it as much. In the acknowledgements of The Greatest Show in the Galaxy: The Discerning Fan's Guide to Doctor Who, Marc Schuster and Tom Powers praised The Discontinuity Guide for its "playful wit".

== See also ==
- List of Doctor Who serials
