= Carole Ann Ford =

British actress (born 1940)

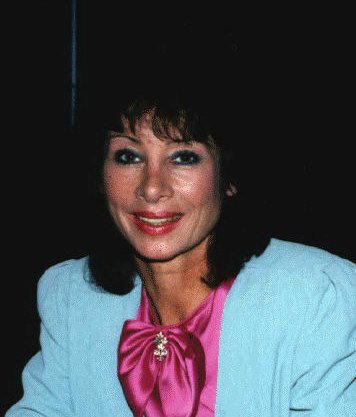
- Ford in 1986
- Born: Carole Ann Lillian Higgins; 16 June 1940 (age 86); Ilford, Essex, England
- Education: Barking Abbey Grammar School
- Occupation: Actress
- Years active: 1947; 1956–present
- Known for: First Doctor Who companion The Day of the Triffids
- Television: Doctor Who (1963–1964, 1983, 1993, 2025)
- Spouses: Walter Jokel (m. 1959; div. 1967); Harry Kornhauser (m. 1974; died 2024)
- Children: 2

Carole Ann Lillian Ford (née Higgins; born 16 June 1940) is an English actress best known for her role as Susan Foreman in the BBC science fiction television series Doctor Who and was one of the original companions to William Hartnell.

== Life and career ==
Ford has had a long and diverse acting career. Her theatrical work includes many comedies, dramas and musicals, including The Jungle Book, Stranger in the House, Bakerloo to Paradise, The Owl and the Pussycat, The Rumpus, Pride and Prejudice, Inadmissible Evidence, Enrico, Expresso Bongo, Sleeping Beauty, You Never Can Tell, Ned Kelly, Mother, MacBett, The Boy Friend, Have You Seen Manchester and Private Lives.

Her film appearances include The Day of the Triffids (1962) as the blind French girl Bettina, Mix Me a Person (1962), The Great St Trinian's Train Robbery (1966), The Hiding Place (1975) and The Incredible Sarah (1976). In addition to Doctor Who, her television appearances include Suspense (in the episode "Man on a Bicycle"), Whatever Happened to the Likely Lads? (in the episode "Affairs and Relations"), Public Eye, Emergency Ward 10, Attorney General, Moonstrike, Compact, Probation Officer and Dial M for Murder (1967).

Ford appeared on Juke Box Jury and various quiz shows, and has performed many voice-overs and voice dubs.

=== Doctor Who ===
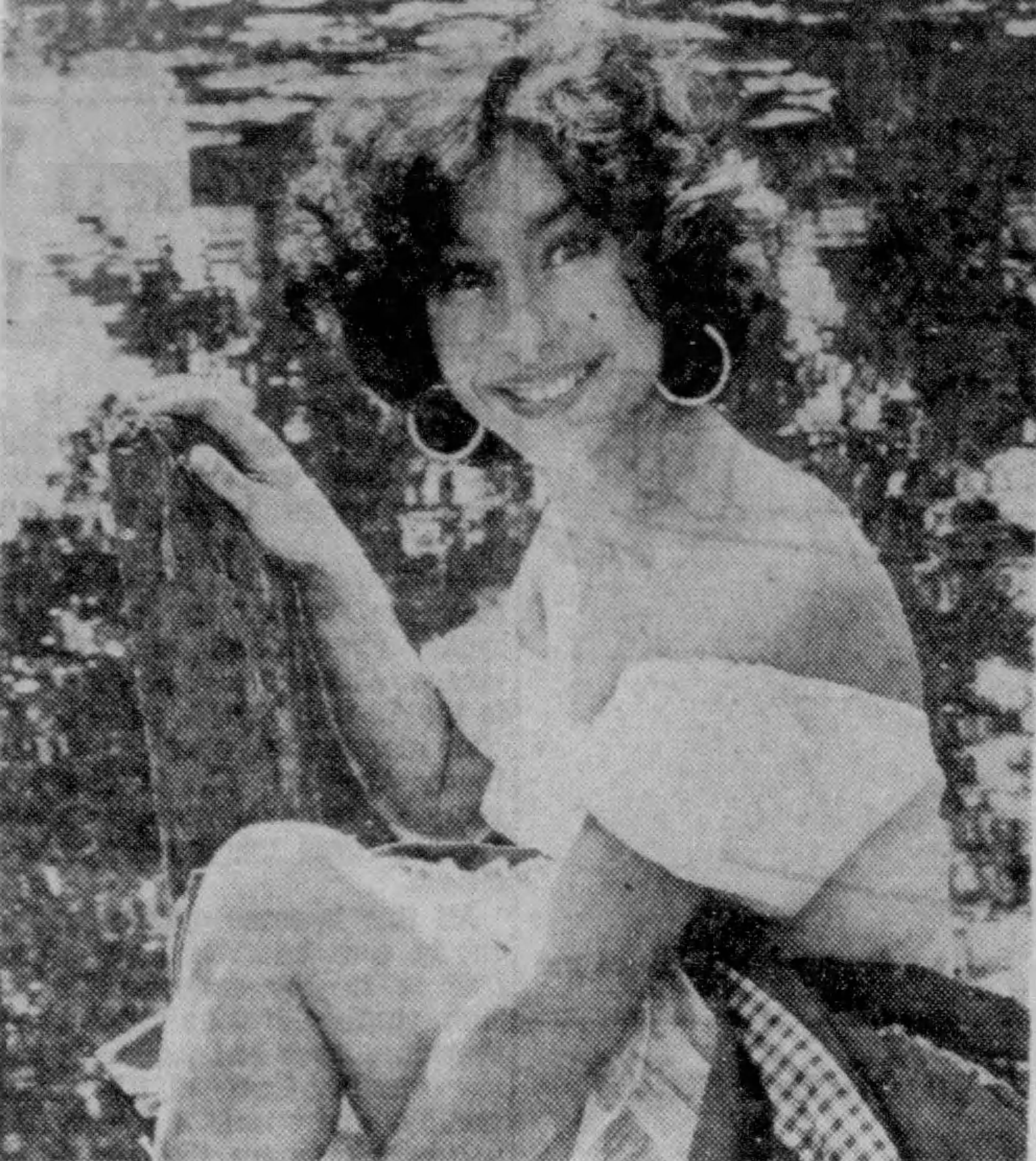
Ford in costume while filming The Day of the Triffids in 1961

According to the documentary Doctor Who: Origins, an appearance on Z-Cars prompted Ford's screen test for the role of Susan in Doctor Who in 1963. Playing the granddaughter of the Doctor, Ford was one of the three original companions to accompany William Hartnell's incarnation of the Time Lord. The character of Susan is the Unearthly Child referred to in the show's first episode, since she, like the Doctor, was from the planet Gallifrey. According to Ford, Susan was originally intended to be a character similar to those in The Champions, with telepathic abilities as well as the skills to fly the TARDIS, but in the series she was made to be far more ordinary. Her character departed from the series at the conclusion of the 1964 serial The Dalek Invasion of Earth, but returned briefly for both the series's 20th-anniversary TV special, "The Five Doctors" (1983), and 30th-anniversary charity special, Dimensions in Time (1993). She appeared as a different character in the independent Doctor Who spin-off film Shakedown: Return of the Sontarans (1995).

Ford mostly stopped acting following an illness in the 1970s which led to a dramatic weight reduction and the loss of her voice; it recovered later. Since then, she has taught voice and presentation skills and dialogue coaching to politicians, businesspeople, after-dinner speakers, and actors. Since the 2000s, however, she has made a limited return to the profession, reprising the role of Susan in a number of Doctor Who audio plays by Big Finish Productions (some of which have been broadcast on BBC Radio): two Doctor Who Unbound stories, Auld Mortality and A Storm of Angels; two Companion Chronicles stories, Here There Be Monsters and Quinnis; and three stories also featuring the Doctor, starting with the subscription-only release An Earthly Child, in which her character is reunited with Paul McGann's Eighth Doctor, followed by Relative Dimensions and Lucie Miller. She will reprise her role in the upcoming audio drama Families which will be part of Big Finish's Companion Chronicles range.

She was played by Claudia Grant in the BBC Two docu-drama An Adventure in Space and Time, which dramatises the story of the conception of Doctor Who and was broadcast on 21 November 2013 to complement the series' 50th-anniversary special. Ford herself appeared in a small role as a character named Joyce.

In November 2013, Ford appeared in the one-off 50th-anniversary comedy homage The Five(ish) Doctors Reboot. Ford also narrated the behind the scenes look at the making of An Adventure In Space And Time, The Making of Doctor Who. She examines the making of Doctor Who and what it was like to work with William Hartnell (the First Doctor).

In May 2025, Ford returned to Doctor Who, portraying Susan in the episode "The Interstellar Song Contest", marking 62 years between her first and latest portrayal of the character.

As of 2026, she is the last surviving credited cast member of An Unearthly Child since William Russell's death in June 2024 as well as one of only two credited people involved in the serial who are still alive (the other being director Waris Hussein).

== Filmography ==
=== Film ===
Year	Title	Role	Notes
1948	The Last Load	Unknown	
1957	Saint Joan	Young Girl	Uncredited
1959	Horrors of the Black Museum	Teen in hall of mirrors	Uncredited
1959	The Ghost Train Murder	Jean	
1961	The Night We Got the Bird	Schoolgirl	Uncredited
1962	Mix Me a Person	Jenny	
1962	What Every Woman Wants	Stella	
1962	The Day of the Triffids	Bettina	
1963	The Punch and Judy Man	Girl in seaside kiosk	
1966	The Great St. Trinian's Train Robbery	Mademoiselle Albertine	
1967	The Man Outside	Cindy	
1975	The Hiding Place	Woman	uncredited
1976	The Incredible Sarah	Unknown	uncredited
1994	Shakedown: Return of the Sontarans	Zorelle	
1999	Soul's Ark	Stella Grant	
2026	Harbinger	Sue	

=== Television ===
Year	Title	Role	Notes
1958	Expresso Bongo	Ensemble	TV film
1959	Probation Officer	Susan Portway	Series 1, Episode 12
1960	Emergency-Ward 10	Miss Foulkes	Series 1, Episode 385
1961	Dixon of Dock Green	Helen Layton	Episode: "River Beat"
1961	No Hiding Place	Mary Donovan	Episode: "The Toy House"
1961	The Attorney-General	Martha Salisbury	TV film
1962	Crying Down the Lane	Jenny	2 episodes
1962	Z-Cars	Rita	Episode: "The Big Catch"
1962	Top Secret	Sonia	Episode: "Dance for Spies"
1962	Harpers West One	Marilyn	Series 2, Episode 5
1963	Moonstrike	Marguerite	Episode: "Five Hours to Kill"
1963	Suspense	Jacky	Episode: "The Man on the Bicycle"
1963–1964, 1983, 1993, 2025	Doctor Who	Susan Foreman	54 episodes
1965	Public Eye	Jenny Graham	Episode: "The Morning Wasn't So Hot"
1967	Dial M For Murder	Unknown	TV film
1974	Whatever Happened to the Likely Lads?	Valerie	Episode: "Affairs and Relations"
2013	An Adventure in Space and Time	Joyce	TV film
2013	The Five(ish) Doctors Reboot	Carole Ann Ford	TV film
2022	Henry House	Verity Totter	Episode: "The Pilot"
