= An Adventure in Space and Time =

2013 British television film

- Film poster
- Written by: Mark Gatiss
- Directed by: Terry McDonough
- Starring: David Bradley; Jessica Raine; Sacha Dhawan; Lesley Manville; Brian Cox
- Music by: Edmund Butt
- Country of origin: United Kingdom
- Original language: English

Production
- Executive producers: Mark Gatiss; Steven Moffat; Caroline Skinner
- Producer: Matt Strevens
- Cinematography: John Pardue
- Editor: Philip Kloss
- Running time: 83 minutes
- Production companies: BBC America; BBC Cymru Wales

Original release
- Network: BBC Two
- Release: 21 November 2013

An Adventure in Space and Time is a 2013 British biographical television film directed by Terry McDonough and written by Mark Gatiss. Starring David Bradley, Jessica Raine, Sacha Dhawan, Lesley Manville and Brian Cox, it was produced to commemorate the 50th anniversary of the BBC science fiction television series Doctor Who.

The film dramatises the development and early years of Doctor Who from 1963 to 1966, with emphasis on the series' original lead actor William Hartnell (Bradley). Raine, Dhawan and Cox respectively portray producer Verity Lambert, director Waris Hussein and co-creator Sydney Newman. Gatiss pitched the project as early as 2003 for Doctor Who's 40th anniversary. The production, which shot from February to March 2013, recreated elements from the series' history in many of the actual locations depicted in the film. It was the final drama to be recorded at the BBC Television Centre before its closure.

An Adventure in Space and Time premiered at BFI Southbank on 12 November 2013 and later aired on BBC Two on 21 November. The film was critically praised, receiving three BAFTA Craft Award nominations and winning for Make Up and Hair Design. It also received nominations for the British Academy Television Award for Best Single Drama and the Hugo Award for Best Dramatic Presentation, Short Form.

== Plot ==
Sydney Newman, the new BBC Head of Drama, devises a new science fiction programme titled Doctor Who to plug a gap between the broadcasts of Grandstand and Juke Box Jury. Newman's former production assistant Verity Lambert is recruited to produce the programme, but she faces pushback from others due to her inexperience. Lambert and director Waris Hussein convince actor William Hartnell, typecasted in military roles, to portray the eccentric lead character of the Doctor despite his trepidation over taking on a long-running series.

Lambert becomes more assertive and champions Doctor Who despite little faith from higher-ups at the BBC. Production of the pilot episode "An Unearthly Child" is beset by difficulties. Newman dislikes the pilot and orders a re-shoot, including a request for Hartnell's character to be gentler and kinder on screen. Lambert and Hussein complete the re-shoot in time for the pilot to be broadcast on its scheduled transmission date, 23 November. However, the episode receives a diminished audience in the wake of the assassination of John F. Kennedy and executive Donald Baverstock asks Newman to cancel the programme. Lambert successfully appeals to Newman to allow her to produce the next serial, The Daleks, which will introduce "bug-eyed monsters" into Doctor Who against Newman's earlier protestations. The villainous Daleks are popular with children and Newman admits he was mistaken upon seeing strong viewing figures.

Hartnell takes delight in the role of the Doctor and the popularity it brings him with children. As the programme progresses, the supporting cast, as well as Lambert and Hussein, move on to other productions. Hartnell becomes agitated with the programme's changes; additionally his health begins to decline. Concerned over Hartnell's failure to remember his lines and his clashes with the production team, Newman decides to replace him with a new actor, Patrick Troughton. Hartnell agrees to leave, but breaks down upon telling his wife Heather the news, stating "I don't want to go".

Hartnell reflects on his history with the programme while preparing to record The Tenth Planet, his final Doctor Who serial in the lead role. As recording begins, Hartnell looks across the TARDIS console and acknowledges a brief vision of another actor playing the Doctor decades later. (Note: Matt Smith (Eleventh Doctor) in the original 2013 broadcast, and Ncuti Gatwa (Fifteenth Doctor) in the 2023 rebroadcast) The film closes on the real Hartnell's speech from the end of The Dalek Invasion of Earth.

== Cast ==
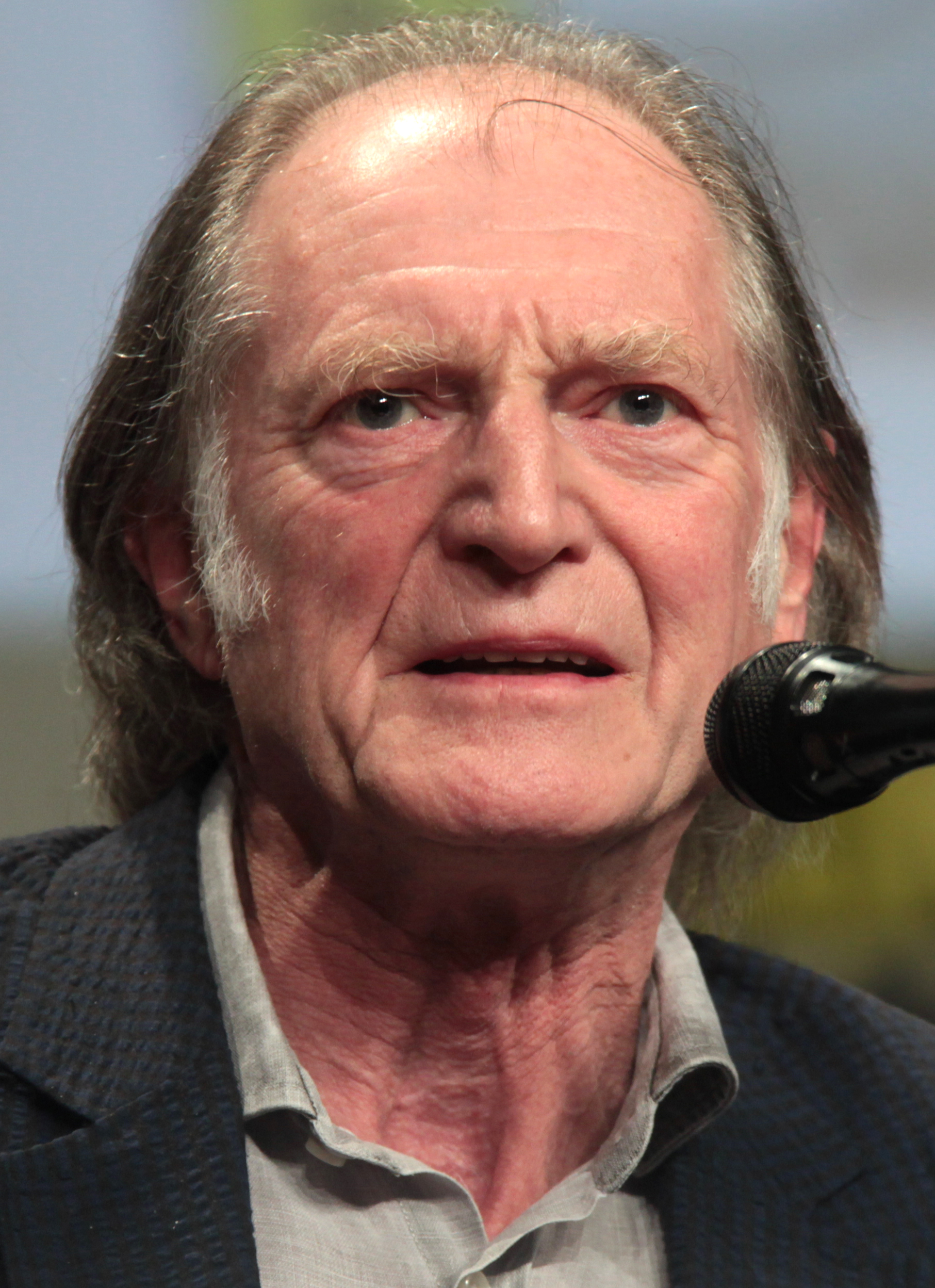
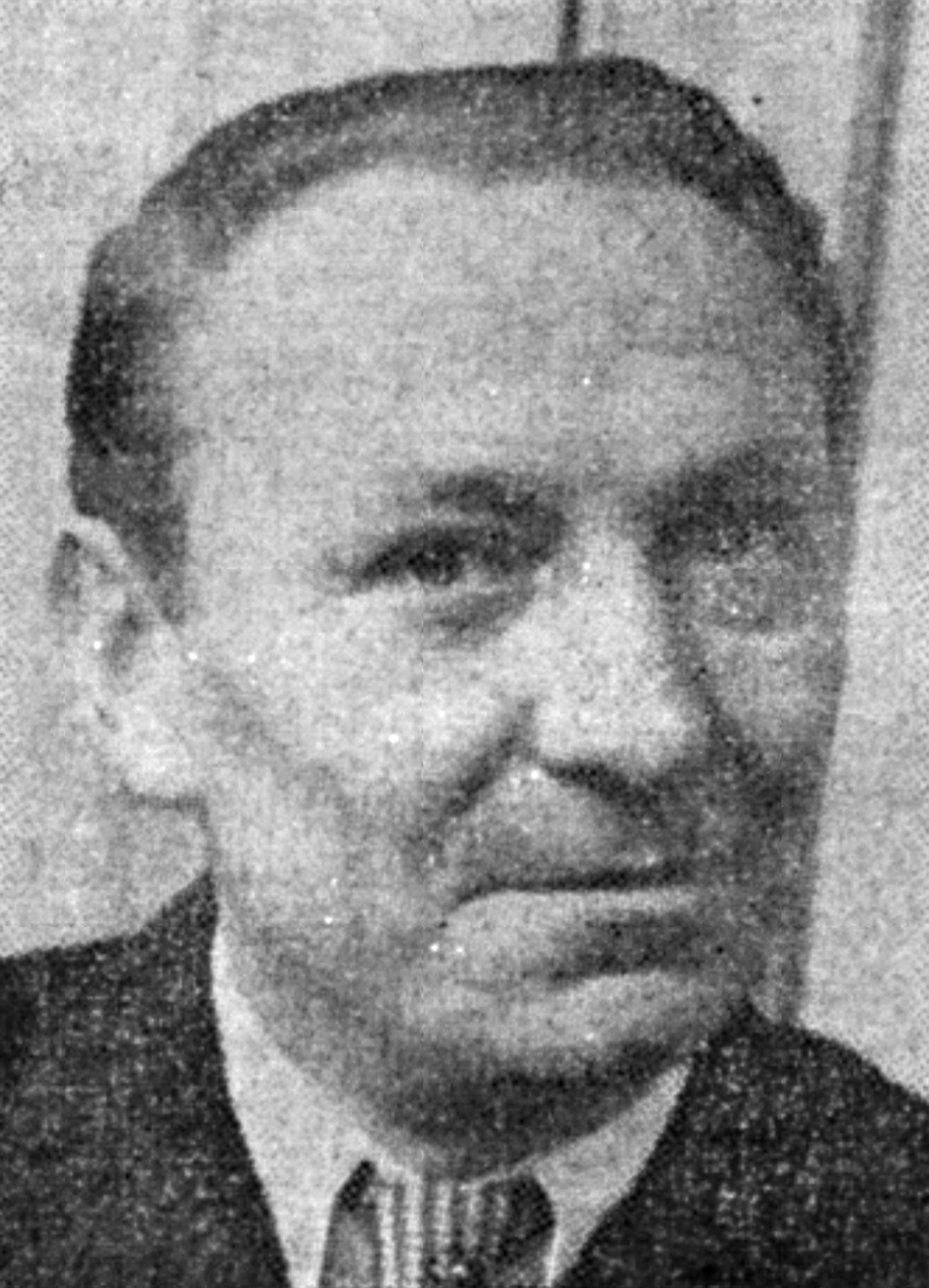
David Bradley portrayed actor William Hartnell, who portrayed the First Doctor
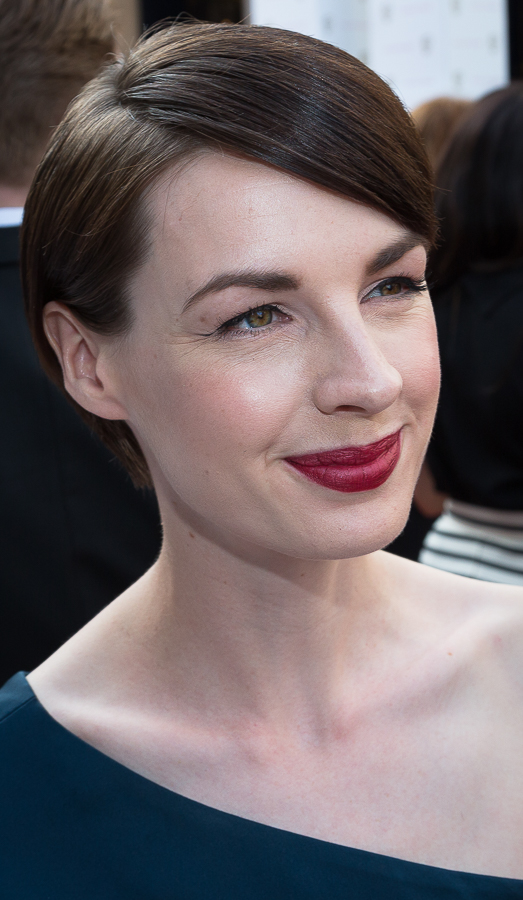
Jessica Raine portrayed Verity Lambert, original producer of Doctor Who
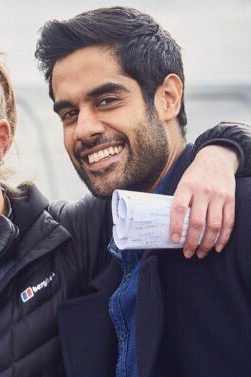
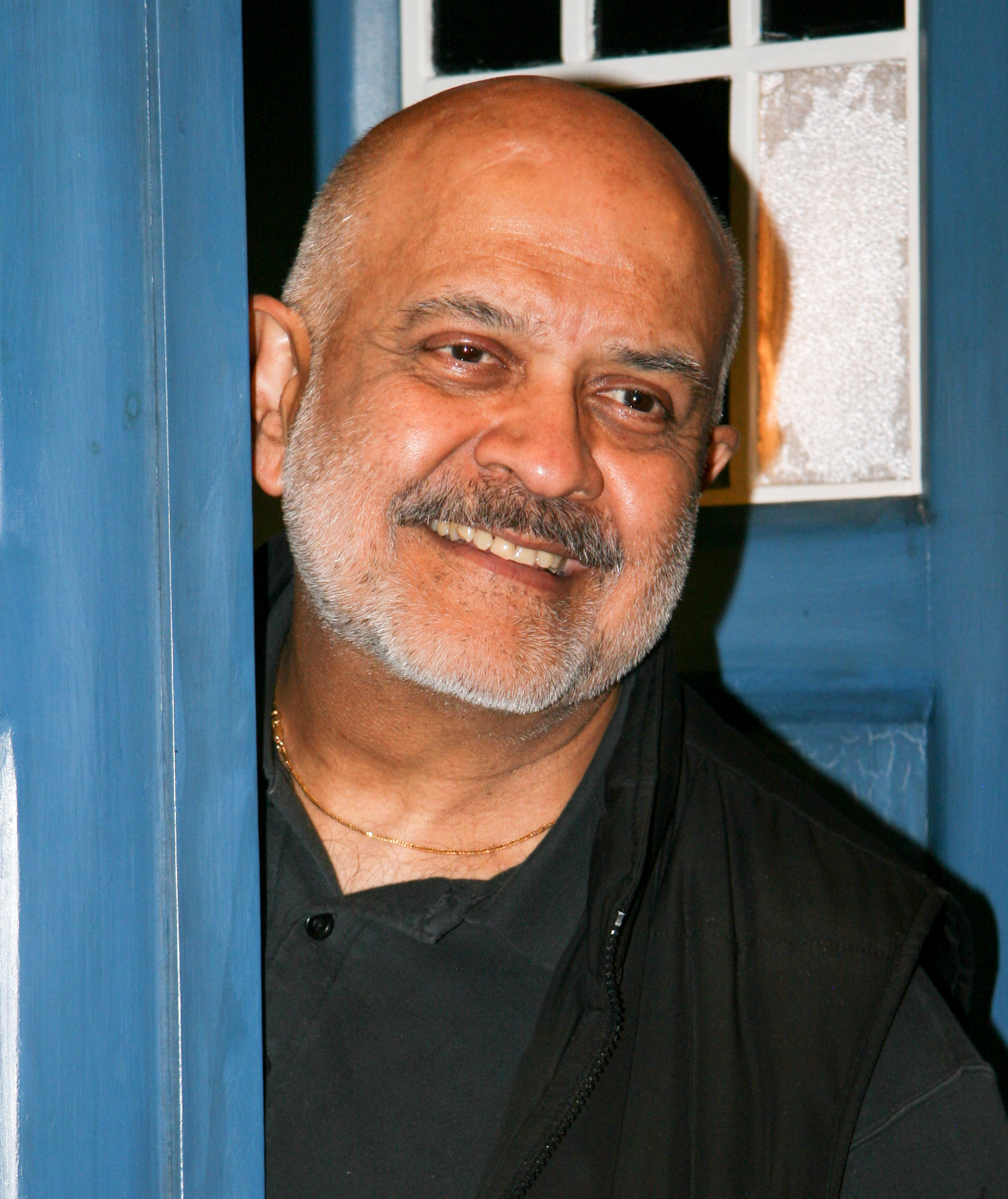
Sacha Dhawan portrayed Waris Hussein, director of An Unearthly Child
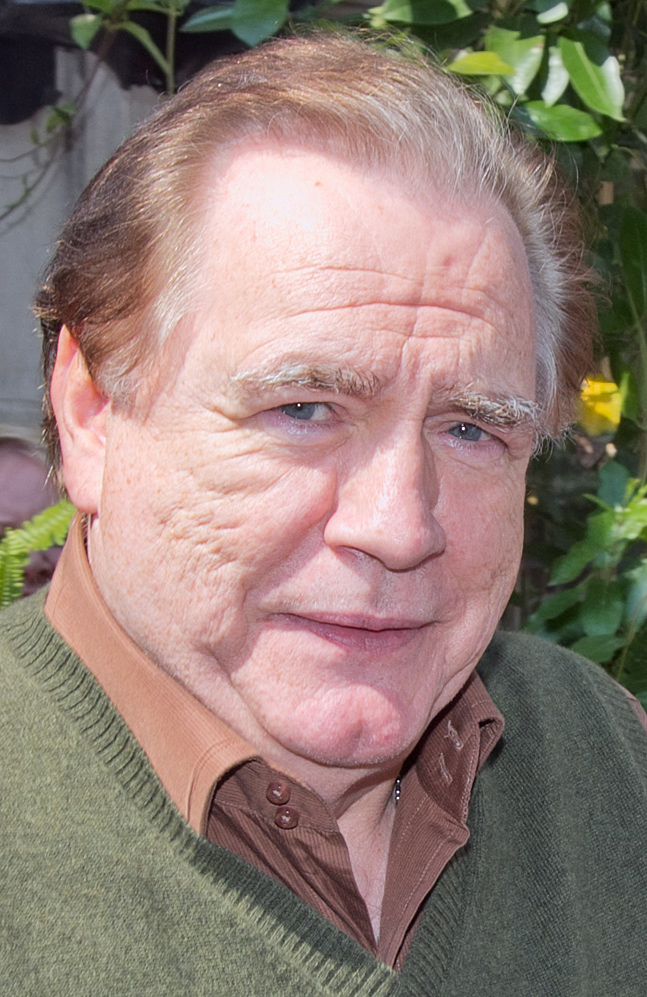
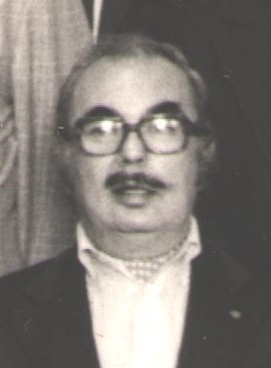
Brian Cox portrayed Doctor Who co-creator Sydney Newman

The cast were credited in order of appearance:

- David Bradley as William Hartnell, who portrayed the First Doctor
- Ross Gurney-Randall as Reg
- Roger May as Len
- Sam Hoare as Douglas Camfield, production assistant and director
- Charlie Kemp as Arthur
- Brian Cox as Sydney Newman, BBC Head of Drama and co-creator
- William Russell as Harry - Security Guard
- Jeff Rawle as Mervyn Pinfield, associate producer
- Andrew Woodall as Rex Tucker, BBC producer
- Jessica Raine as Verity Lambert, original producer
- Jemma Powell as Jacqueline Hill, who portrayed Barbara Wright
- Lesley Manville as Heather Hartnell, wife of William Hartnell
- Cara Jenkins as Judith Carney, granddaughter of William Hartnell
- Sacha Dhawan as Waris Hussein, original director
- Toby Hadoke as Cyril, a bartender
- Sarah Winter as Delia Derbyshire, arranger of composer Ron Grainer's theme music
- Jamie Glover as William Russell, who portrayed Ian Chesterton
- Claudia Grant as Carole Ann Ford, who portrayed Susan Foreman
- David Annen as Peter Brachacki, original production designer
- Mark Eden as Donald Baverstock, controller of BBC1
- Ian Hallard as Richard Martin, director
- Nicholas Briggs as Peter Hawkins, original voice of the Daleks
- Carole Ann Ford as Joyce
- Reece Pockney as Alan
- Reece Shearsmith as Patrick Troughton, who portrayed the Second Doctor

The following actors were uncredited for their appearance:

- Anna-Lisa Drew as Maureen O'Brien, who portrayed Vicki
- Edmund Short as Peter Purves, who portrayed Steven Taylor
- Sophie Holt as Jackie Lane, who portrayed Dodo Chaplet
- Robin Varley as Michael Craze, who portrayed Ben Jackson
- Ellie Spicer as Anneke Wills, who portrayed Polly
- Joseph Railton as Brian Hodgson, creator of sound effects
- Kit Connor as Charlie
- Matthew Sweet as an actor playing a Menoptera
- Matt Smith as the Eleventh Doctor
  - Ncuti Gatwa replaces Smith, appearing as the Fifteenth Doctor, in the 2023 rebroadcast

== Production ==
=== Development ===
For the 30th anniversary of the BBC science fiction series Doctor Who in 1993, filmmaker Kevin Davies pitched a project titled The Legend Begins to the BBC. The Legend Begins would have mixed documentary interviews with those responsible for the creation of Doctor Who with a dramatised strand showing the programme's beginnings. Eventually, the dramatisation concept was abandoned in favour of a standard documentary looking at the entire history of Doctor Who, which was broadcast on BBC1 as Doctor Who: Thirty Years in the TARDIS in November 1993. Ten years later, for the 40th anniversary, writer Mark Gatiss pitched a similar biographical film to BBC Four, unaware of Davies's previous attempt. However, the proposal was rejected, and Gatiss was told that there was no available slot or budget. Gatiss became a regular writer for Doctor Who after its revival in 2005. He considered pitching the project shortly after Matt Smith was cast as the Eleventh Doctor but was advised by then-showrunner Steven Moffat to wait until Doctor Who's 50th anniversary. The project was finally greenlit by August 2012.

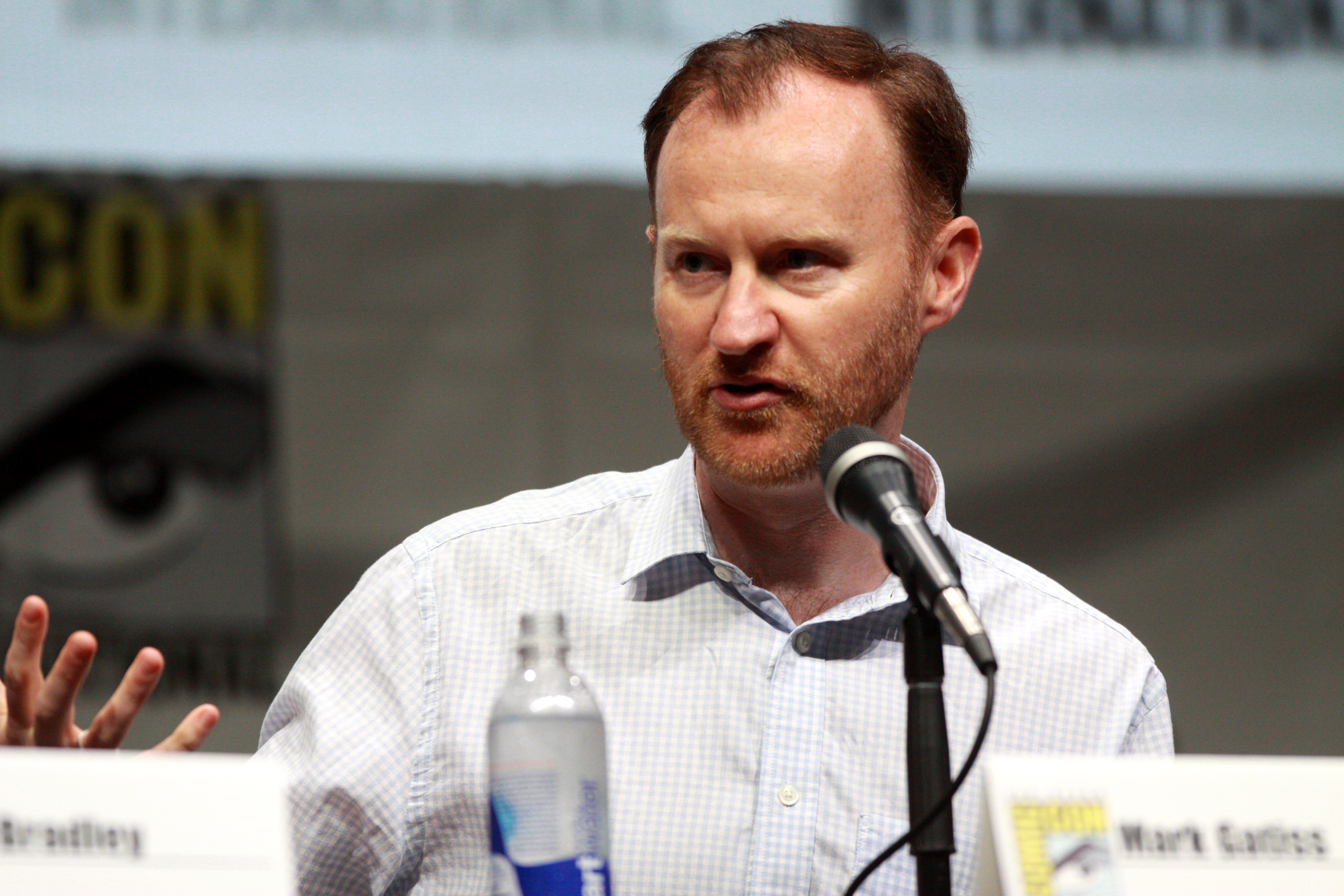
Mark Gatiss (pictured in 2013) wrote An Adventure in Space and Time, having pitched it to the BBC ten years before its eventual production.

=== Casting ===
Gatiss offered the part of Doctor Who's original lead actor William Hartnell to David Bradley, his first and only choice, whilst the two of them were watching Elizabeth II's Diamond Jubilee flotilla from the roof of the National Theatre. Bradley studied Hartnell's Doctor Who performances, as well as the films Brighton Rock (1948) and This Sporting Life (1936), to prepare for the role. Brian Cox, cast as Doctor Who co-creator Sydney Newman, had briefly met Newman in 1965 whilst working at the BBC. Sacha Dhawan, cast as Doctor Who's original director Waris Hussein, met Hussein prior to filming. He recorded their conversations to study Hussein's voice and mannerisms. Claudia Grant, cast as actress Carole Ann Ford, did not realise that her agent Judith "Jessica" Carney was Hartnell's real-life granddaughter until after she got the part. Since Gatiss first pitched the project, he sought to cast Reece Shearsmith, his co-star in The League of Gentlemen (1999–2002), as Hartnell's successor Patrick Troughton. Nicholas Briggs, who voiced the Daleks since 2005, was invited by Gatiss to portray the Daleks' original voice actor Peter Hawkins.

Several individuals involved in Doctor Who from 1963 to 1966 make cameo appearances in An Adventure in Space and Time. Actors Carole Ann Ford (portrayed Susan Foreman) and William Russell (portrayed Ian Chesterton) play Joyce and BBC commissionaire Harry respectively. Mark Eden, who played the title character in the season 1 serial Marco Polo (1964), plays Donald Baverstock, controller of BBC1. Actors Jean Marsh (portrayed Sara Kingdom) and Anneke Wills (portrayed Polly), as well as former story editor Donald Tosh and vision mixer Clive Doig, appear at Lambert's leaving party.

Several cast members in An Adventure in Space and Time previously appeared in Doctor Who. Jeff Rawle appeared in Frontios (1984); Bradley appeared in "Dinosaurs on a Spaceship" (2013); Jessica Raine appeared in "Hide" (2013) and a 2013 Call the Midwife charity crossover minisode; Cox voiced the Elder Ood in The End of Time (2009–2010).

=== Writing ===
"It's about four outsiders: Waris is the first Indian director, a gay man; Verity is the first female producer; Sydney is this breath of fresh air from Canada and even though he's not young, he's young in spirit; and Bill is this curious man known for a particular type of part who is transformed by the Doctor. So that was always the intention, but it's become very much about Bill and Verity."

— Mark Gatiss discussing the film in 2013

To make the film comprehensible to a general audience, Gatiss chose not to represent all personnel involved in the creation of Doctor Who. The role of original story editor David Whitaker is merged with that of associate producer Mervyn Pinfield; co-creator Donald Wilson and writer C.E. Webber are also excluded. Christopher Barry's role is also shared between directors Waris Hussein and Richard Martin; at one point Gatiss considered depicting Hussein as directing "more than he did for dramatic licence" but decided against it. He also deleted a subplot about the Daleks' creation which would have featured designer Raymond Cusick as a character, and would have humorously referenced Ridley Scott's near-involvement as the original designer assigned to The Daleks (1963–1964). Gatiss wrote Lambert's line to Hartnell "So many people have been at the birth of this thing..." as a nod to individuals not included in the film.

=== Filming ===
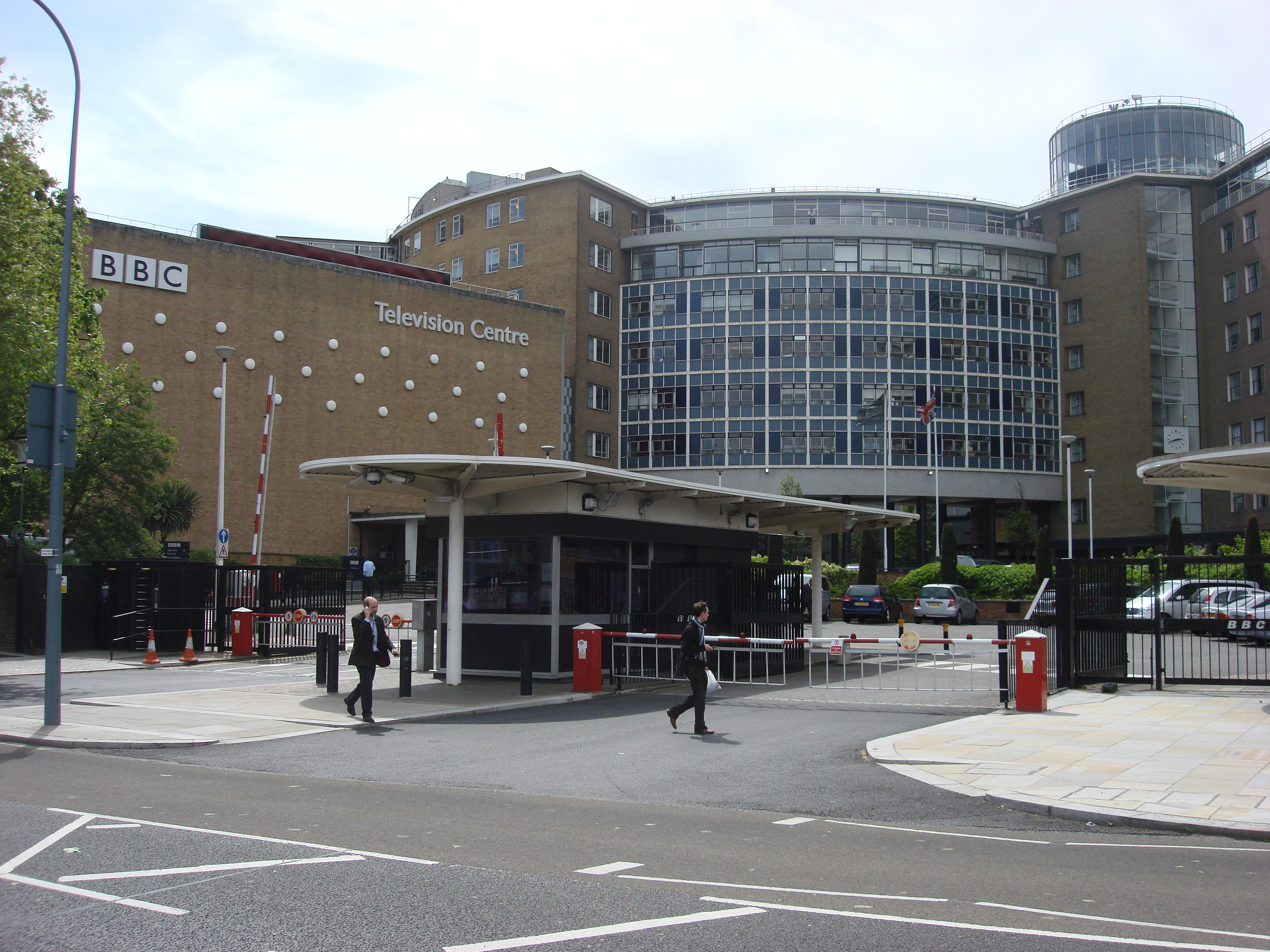
An Adventure in Space and Time was the final drama shot at the BBC Television Centre (pictured in 2009) before it closed.

Principal photography began on 3 February 2013. The production design team replicated production elements from various 1960s Doctor Who serials (including missing episodes), such as An Unearthly Child (1963), The Daleks, Marco Polo, The Reign of Terror (1964), The Dalek Invasion of Earth (1964), The Web Planet (1965) and The Massacre (1966). Doctor Who historian Andrew Pixley served as an on-set historical advisor.

The production shot in many of the actual locations depicted in the film. It was the final drama to be recorded at the BBC Television Centre which closed after filming concluded—the production was almost prevented from filming there due to concerns it would disrupt the tour schedule. Location filming took place in London on the morning of 17 February, with Dalek props crossing Westminster Bridge in a recreation of The Dalek Invasion of Earth.

Wimbledon Studios doubled for Lime Grove Studios, which was demolished in the 1990s. The early-60s studio environment was replicated to the extent that it effectively worked as a real studio. It took three weeks to build the TARDIS studio set. The brass pillars beside the TARDIS doors are the original 1963 props. Peter Capaldi, a fan of the series, visited the TARDIS studio set prior to his casting as the Twelfth Doctor.

Gatiss had ambitions to depict the filming of The Daleks' Master Plan (1965–1966), a serial in which Sara Kingdom, played by actress Jean Marsh, was gradually aged to death. The original production achieved this by casting May Warden as the aged version of Sara. Gatiss hoped to cast the now-older Marsh as Warden, but this sequence was deemed too expensive to achieve. It was also too costly to include a recreated Zarbi costume in The Web Planet sequence. Gatiss considered ending the film with the Radio Times publicity photoshoot for The Three Doctors (1972–1973), but again the budget did not accommodate this. Nevertheless, Gatiss himself dressed up as Jon Pertwee on set to take photos with Shearsmith and Bradley. Principal photography completed in early March. Matt Smith's scene was filmed at Roath Lock Studios in Cardiff on 25 March.

== Release and reception ==
An Adventure in Space and Time previewed at BFI Southbank on 12 November 2013. The film premiered on BBC Two on 21 November, and was watched by 2.2 million viewers in the UK. It was broadcast a day later in the US on BBC America. Rotten Tomatoes gave the film a 95% approval rating based on 22 reviews, and an average score of 8.5/10. The website's critics consensus reads "Fun, clever, and eminently accessible, An Adventure in Space and Time offers entertaining viewing for Doctor Who newcomers and diehards alike." On Metacritic, it holds a weighted average score of 77 out of 100, based on 11 reviews, indicating "generally favorable reviews".

Seb Patrick, writing for Den of Geek, commended the recreations of Doctor Who and period elements, but criticised the "fairly by-the-numbers" screenplay for sticking to biopic cliches. He praised the performances of Raine and Bradley and called the film an "incredibly touching tribute". Morgan Jeffery, writing for Digital Spy, praised Edmund Butt's score and Dave Arrowsmith's production design. He stated "the chief reason why An Adventure is so successful though is ultimately Gatiss's script [which] works as a standalone piece of drama, one that can be enjoyed by any Who novice out there. You might appreciate what's unfolding on screen on a slightly deeper level if you're a fan, but it's certainly not a requirement." He compared Hartnell's character arc to A Christmas Carol. Marc Bernadin, writing for The Hollywood Reporter, praised Bradley's performance. Matt Smith's cameo was described as "touching" by critics. Critics noted that, as the film was produced by the BBC, it glosses over any possibly unsavoury elements of Doctor Who's history.

An Adventure in Space and Time was nominated for the BAFTA for Best Single Drama, losing to Complicit, and the Hugo Award for Best Dramatic Presentation, Short Form, losing to the Game of Thrones episode "The Rains of Castamere". The film was also nominated for three BAFTA Craft Awards which recognise behind-the-scenes production talent; the nominees included Suzanne Cave for Best Costume Design, Philip Kloss for Editing – Fiction and Vickie Lang for Make Up and Hair Design. Lang was successful in her category.

In 2026, academic David Rollinson wrote a full length book examing the docudrama as a special edition of the Black Archive series of books on Doctor Who from Obverse Books.

== Historical accuracy ==
Gatiss removed, invented or altered historical events in his dramatisation of Doctor Who's development to avoid over-complicating the film's storyline. The cavemen actors would not have been on set during filming of the series' pilot episode. Baverstock's request to not "proceed any further with the production of more than 4 episodes" occurred on 18 October, the same date that "An Unearthly Child" was remounted. Contrary to the film's depiction, studio recording on "The Dead Planet" (15 November 1963) took place prior to the broadcast of "An Unearthly Child" (23 November 1963).

Peter Hawkins's Dalek dialogue was pre-recorded, not performed live on set. Richard Martin is depicted as the director of both "The Dead Planet" and Part Four of The Massacre; in reality these episodes were directed by Christopher Barry and Paddy Russell respectively.

Leslie Illingworth's "Degaullek" caricature was published in the Daily Mail on 16 December 1964, though Hartnell and Lambert are depicted reading it prior to the completion of studio recording on Marco Polo, which completed on 13 March 1964. Hartnell is also depicted wearing his costume from The Reign of Terror, which completed studio recording on 14 August 1964, while holding a copy of Doctor Who Annual with a Menoptera from The Web Planet on its cover, even though the latter serial wasn't commissioned until 28 September 1964.

Verity Lambert's final Doctor Who serial as producer was Mission to the Unknown (1965), not The Web Planet. Mervyn Pinfield retired in June 1965 due to ill health and he died on 20 May 1966, though the film depicts Pinfield alive and still involved in Doctor Who following the 12 June 1966 press photocall for Anneke Wills and Michael Craze's casting.

== Home media ==
An Adventure in Space and Time was released on Region 2 DVD on 2 December 2013. Special features included 1960s scene reconstructions, deleted scenes and the documentary The Making of An Adventure narrated by Carole Ann Ford. A three-disc Blu-ray set was released in North America on 27 May 2014, including the film on Blu-ray, DVD and An Unearthly Child on DVD. In September 2014, the film was released on DVD and Blu-ray as part of the limited edition "50th Anniversary Collectors Edition" boxset. In November 2020, a limited edition Blu-ray steelbook of the 2013 specials, with the film as a special feature, was announced.

=== Soundtrack release ===
Edmund Butt's score was released by Silva Screen Records on 3 March 2014.

==== Track listing ====
No.	Title	Length
1.	"Main Theme – An Adventure in Space and Time"	0:38
2.	"The Right Man"	1:17
3.	"The First Woman Producer"	1:21
4.	"I've Got an Idea..."	1:34
5.	"The Daleks"	2:52
6.	"Kill Dr. Who"	1:48
7.	"What Dimension?"	1:24
8.	"This Is My Show"	1:50
9.	"Autograph Hunting"	2:31
10.	"Sydney Newman"	1:00
11.	"Scarlett O'Hara"	1:03
12.	"Piss & Vinegar"	1:24
13.	"Dressing Room"	1:18
14.	"JFK Assassinated"	1:48
15.	"The TARDIS"	0:57
16.	"Goodbye Susan"	2:37
17.	"10 Million Viewers"	0:57
18.	"The Fans"	0:41
19.	"I'm So Sorry Bill"	2:45
20.	"Kiss Goodbye"	1:05
21.	"My Successor"	1:06
22.	"Isop Galaxy"	0:50
23.	"Irreplaceable"	1:19
24.	"The New Doctor"	3:55
25.	"Time's Up..."	1:15

== Legacy ==
Bradley went on to portray the First Doctor in the Doctor Who episodes "The Doctor Falls", "Twice Upon a Time" (both 2017) and "The Power of the Doctor" (2022). Bradley also portrayed the character in a licensed audio drama series produced by Big Finish Productions alongside Jamie Glover, Jemma Powell and Claudia Grant as Ian, Barbara and Susan respectively. Dhawan portrayed the major recurring role of the Master in Doctor Who beginning with "Spyfall" (2020).

In November 2023, Gatiss expressed interest in creating a sequel centred around the events surrounding the 1986 storyline The Trial of a Time Lord, including the programme's nine-month hiatus and the eventual firing of Sixth Doctor actor Colin Baker.

On 23 November 2023, the film was rebroadcast on BBC Four to coincide with Doctor Who's 60th anniversary, and featured some alterations, including Smith's cameo replaced by then-incoming Fifteenth Doctor actor Ncuti Gatwa. Scenes featuring dialogue originally used in An Unearthly Child were removed, which many assumed was due to the estate of writer Anthony Coburn withholding licensing rights from the BBC.

In April 2026, Obverse Books released a book by academic David Rolinson examining An Adventure in Space and Time in detail, as a tenth anniversary special of their Black Archive series of books.
