= The Traitors (disambiguation) =

The Traitors is a reality game show franchise.

The Traitors may also refer to:

- De Verraders, the original Dutch TV series
  - The Traitors (American TV series), an American adaptation
  - The Traitors (Australian TV series), an Australian adaptation
  - The Traitors (British TV series), a British adaptation
  - The Traitors Canada, a Canadian adaptation
  - The Traitors Ireland, an Irish adaptation
  - The Traitors (Indian TV series), an Indian adaptation
  - The Traitors Italia, an Italian adaptation
  - The Traitors NZ, a New Zealand adaptation
  - The Traitors (Telugu TV series), an Indian Telugu adaptation
  - The Traitors. Zdrajcy, a Polish adaptation
  - Die Verräter – Vertraue Niemandem!, a German adaptation
  - Les Traîtres, a French adaptation
  - Oi Prodotes (Greek: Οι Προδότες), a Greek adaptation
  - Trădătorii, a Romanian adaptation
  - Traitors: Igra na predateli (Bulgarian: Traitors: Игра на предатели), a Bulgarian adaptation
- The Traitors (film), a 1962 British film
- The Traitors (1972 film), an Argentinian film
- The Traitors: Acts of Betrayal, a British play cycle based on the TV series
- "The Traitors", fourth episode of the 1965 Doctor Who serial The Daleks' Master Plan
- The Traitors (web series), a 2024 Russian documentary

== See also ==
- Traitor (disambiguation)
- Traiteur (disambiguation)
