= Mission to the Unknown =

019 – "Mission to the Unknown"
- Doctor Who episode
- A production still showing the Daleks colluding with the masters of the Fifth Galaxy. (Note: No broadcast images from the original episode exist, leaving only production stills and off-air audio recordings.) Critics praised the costumes and set design.

Cast
- Starring: Barry Jackson – Jeff Garvey; Edward de Souza – Marc Cory; Jeremy Young – Gordon Lowery; Robert Cartland – Malpha; David Graham, Peter Hawkins – Dalek voices; Robert Jewell, Kevin Manser, John Scott Martin, Gerald Taylor – Dalek operators

Production
- Directed by: Derek Martinus
- Written by: Terry Nation
- Script editor: Donald Tosh
- Produced by: Verity Lambert
- Music by: Trevor Duncan (Note: Stock music sourced from a 1956 disc)
- Production code: DC; T/A; T Episode 5 (Note: The episode's production code changed throughout production: "DC" around April and May 1965, "T/A" in July, and later "T Episode 5".)
- Series: Season 3
- Running time: 25 minutes
- Episode(s) missing: 1 episode
- First broadcast: 9 October 1965

Chronology
← Preceded by Galaxy 4	Followed by → The Myth Makers

"Mission to the Unknown" (Note: Alternatively known as "Dalek Cutaway" or as a combination of the two titles) is the second serial of the third season of the British science fiction television series Doctor Who. Written by Terry Nation and directed by Derek Martinus, the single episode was broadcast on BBC1 on 9 October 1965. The only standalone regular episode of the show's original run, (Note: The 1983 feature-length anniversary special "The Five Doctors" was produced as a single episode, and later shown in a multi-episode format. Standalone episodes became standard in the show's modern run from 2005 with "Rose".) it serves as an introduction to the 12-part story The Daleks' Master Plan. It is notable for the complete absence of the regular cast and the TARDIS; it is the only serial in the show's history not to feature the Doctor at all. The story focuses on Space Security Agent Marc Cory (Edward de Souza) and his attempts to warn Earth of the Daleks' plan to take over the Solar System.

After the show's second production block was granted an additional episode, outgoing story editor Dennis Spooner commissioned Nation to write an extra episode as a cutaway to set up The Daleks' Master Plan. Nation wrote the episode while considering a Dalek-focused spin-off; he used film character James Bond as inspiration for Marc Cory. "Mission to the Unknown" was produced by the same team as its predecessor, Galaxy 4, in a five-week period that concluded the show's second production block; the two serials were held back to open the third season. Failing health prevented original director Mervyn Pinfield from continuing, replaced by Martinus. Production took place at the Television Centre in August 1965.

"Mission to the Unknown" received 8.3 million viewers, a drop from the previous serial. Contemporary and retrospective reviews were generally positive, with praise for the script and direction, though some viewers were confused that the following serial did not immediately continue the narrative. The videotapes of the episode were wiped by the BBC in July 1974, and it remains missing with no remaining footage. Usually alongside The Daleks' Master Plan, "Mission to the Unknown" received print and audiobook adaptations, with off-air recordings used to construct the latter. In 2019, director Andrew Ireland and University of Central Lancashire students recreated the episode in live-action, replicating the 1960s production values.

== Plot ==
On the planet Kembel, Marc Cory and Gordon Lowery of UN Deep Space Force Group 1 are attempting to repair their spacecraft to reach their rendezvous, when they are attacked by the third crew member, Jeff Garvey, who is in a violent state of mind on awaking in the jungle. (Note: As seen in the fourth episode of Galaxy 4) Cory shoots Garvey dead when he is about to fire on Lowery. Bringing Lowery into the spacecraft for debriefing, Cory explains himself to be a Space Security agent assigned to investigate a possible Dalek base for a galactic invasion; a Varga plant confirms their presence. Outside, Garvey's body mutates into a Varga. In the Dalek base, the Dalek Supreme is informed that representatives from seven planets will soon arrive, and sends a Dalek patrol to destroy Cory and Lowery.

Cory stands guard against the slow-moving Varga plants whilst Lowery finishes constructing a rescue beacon. They see a gigantic spaceship fly above them, and Cory deduces the Daleks are planning something with another galactic power. As Lowery is about to record a message, Cory notices something moving in the jungle. Lowery and Cory flee as the Dalek patrol arrives and destroys their ship. In the Dalek base, the representatives from seven galaxies have gathered in a conference room. The Dalek Supreme assures representative Malpha that the human intruders will be dealt with. Cory is compelled to kill Lowery on discovering he is infected by a Varga plant, then records a message, only to be surrounded by the Daleks and exterminated. The taped message lies unregarded in the undergrowth. At the Dalek base, the representatives approve an alliance, agreeing with the Daleks' plan to take over the Solar System.

== Production ==
=== Conception and writing ===
In October 1964, BBC Head of Drama and Doctor Who co-creator Sydney Newman granted the show's producer Verity Lambert an additional episode in the second production block, to compensate for the second season's premiere Planet of Giants—the penultimate serial of the first production block—being cut from four episodes to three. As most stories were structured as four or six parts, this extra episode failed to fit with the regular schedule. Outgoing story editor Dennis Spooner commissioned Terry Nation—creator of the Daleks and the writer of all the Dalek serials to date: the first season's The Daleks (1963–1964) and second season's The Dalek Invasion of Earth (1964) and The Chase (1965)—to co-write the third season's The Daleks' Master Plan (1965–1966). It was decided the extra episode would be used as a cutaway to set up the 12-part Dalek story. By April 1965, Donald Tosh was in the process of replacing Spooner as story editor.

The episode was produced by the same team as the previous serial, Galaxy 4; they were the last to be filmed in the show's second production block, but were held back from transmission in order to open its third season in September. Mervyn Pinfield—an experienced BBC figure who had acted as the show's associate producer from its origins until January 1965—was originally assigned to direct both serials, but his failing health prevented him from doing so, and Lambert brought in Derek Martinus to direct the five episodes. The young Martinus had recently completed the BBC's internal directors' course and had no previous experience leading a television production. Having seen few episodes of Doctor Who, Martinus reviewed the films of some of the previous stories with Lambert; he found them disappointing, which shocked Lambert, and said he wanted to aim for higher standards. Although Lambert was credited as producer of "Mission to the Unknown"—the final story for which she was credited—her role had essentially been replaced by John Wiles.

Terry Nation was commissioned to write the episode on 25 February 1965; he delivered the script by 14 May, having been writing for The Saint at the time. He approached the episode as a technical problem, requiring a small cast and self-contained narrative. The success of the Daleks—particularly due to their imminent American debut in the film Dr. Who and the Daleks (1965)—led Nation to consider the viability of a Dalek-focused spin-off. In writing "Mission to the Unknown", he realised such a story would need a hero and hence wrote Marc Cory as a "space-age Bond", inspired by the recent release of Goldfinger (1964). The episode was originally set on the planet Varga, home of the Varga plants, but this was renamed Kemble (later spelled Kembel) during script revisions for The Daleks' Master Plan. The episode's draft script was titled "Dalek Cutaway", while the rehearsal script bore the title "Mission to the Unknown"; these names were alternated and combined in internal documentation, and the final title has been the subject of debate.

=== Casting and filming ===
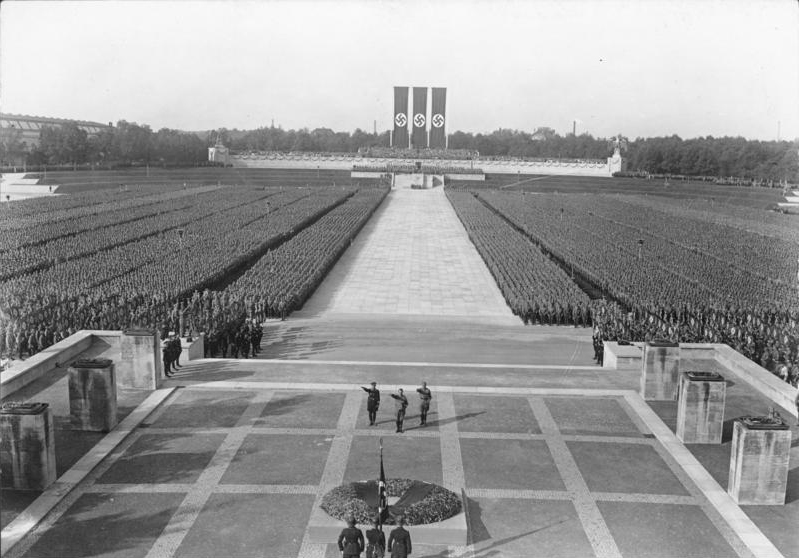
For the design of the Daleks' conference room, Raymond Cusick was inspired by the Nuremberg rallies.

"Mission to the Unknown" is unique in that it does not feature any of the main cast or the TARDIS—the only serial in the show's history not to feature the Doctor at all—a decision made partly to save money on their fees. Despite not appearing in the episode, William Hartnell was still credited for portraying the Doctor per his contract, while Maureen O'Brien and Peter Purves (as Vicki and Steven Taylor, respectively) received credits in Radio Times but not the episode itself. Jeremy Young, who was cast as Gordon Lowery, had previously appeared as Kal in the first Doctor Who serial, An Unearthly Child; he was excited to work with Hartnell again but disappointed when he discovered his absence. Robert Cartland, who portrayed Malpha, (Note: When the character returned in The Daleks' Master Plan, he was portrayed by Bryan Mosley and an uncredited Brian Edwards.) had also appeared in Galaxy 4, directed by Martinus. The Dalek voices—provided by regular actors David Graham and Peter Hawkins—were pre-recorded in Lime Grove Studios on 4 August 1965.

The episode was Richard Hunt's first on Doctor Who as set designer; he made the jungle design, while series veteran Raymond Cusick designed the rocket and message launcher, made both from stock set elements and by Shawcraft Models. For the Daleks' conference room, Cusick was inspired by the Nuremberg rallies. The episode used stock music composed by Trevor Duncan. Pre-filming for "Mission to the Unknown" took place on 25 June 1965 at the BBC's Ealing Studios; the scene in which Garvey mutates into a Varga plant was recorded on 35 mm film. Rehearsals for the episode began on 2 August at the Territorial Army Drill Hall on Uxbridge Road, and the episode was recorded in Studio TC4 of the Television Centre on 6 August. The final scene of Galaxy 4 was recorded alongside the episode so as to avoid re-hiring Jackson and rebuilding the set; the scene was later inserted into Galaxy 4 during editing. Four of the Dalek props from The Chase were re-used in the episode. Recording for "Mission to the Unknown" cost £2,440.

== Reception ==
=== Broadcast and ratings ===
Episode	Title	Run time	Original release date	UK viewers (millions)	Appreciation Index
1	"Mission to the Unknown" (missing)	24:42	9 October 1965	8.3	54

The design of Malpha received critical praise, and was considered the biggest challenge of the episode's 2019 recreation.

The episode was broadcast on BBC1 on 9 October 1965. Viewership dropped from the preceding serial, while the Appreciation Index remained reasonable at 54. 16 mm film recordings were made available for international sale, but the episode was never sold overseas, and BBC Enterprises withdrew it in 1974. The Australian Broadcasting Corporation considered the recording, but it was rejected by the Film Censorship Board in September 1966 as it was considered to constitute "horror", particularly the masked aliens, Varga mutations, and dialogue about murder. The original 405-line tape was cleared for wiping in July 1969, and the episode was erased in July 1974. It remains missing; no known footage exists, though an off-air audio recording was made by fan David Butler during the original 1965 broadcast.

=== Critical response ===
Bill Edmund of Television Today described the episode as an "exciting start" to The Daleks' Master Plan. Several viewers were confused by the lack of Daleks in the following serial—The Myth Makers, a historical adventure set during the Trojan War—and some considered them less frightening due to repeated appearances, while others felt the episode's monsters were too scary. In A Voyage Through 25 Years of Doctor Who (1988), Ian Levine praised the "array of creatures", particularly the design of Malpha. In The Discontinuity Guide (1995), Paul Cornell, Martin Day, and Keith Topping described the episode as "macho, with a sinister atmosphere". In The Television Companion (1998), David J. Howe and Stephen James Walker wrote that the presence of the lead actors was "hardly missed" due to Nation's script and Martinus's direction, praising the tense atmosphere and set designs.

== Commercial releases ==
Mission to the Unknown
- Author: John Peel
- Cover artist: Alister Pearson
- Series: Doctor Who book: Target novelisations
- Release number: 141
- Publisher: Target Books
- Publication date: 21 September 1989
- ISBN: 978-0-426-20343-8

The story was novelised as part of The Daleks' Master Plan Part I: Mission to the Unknown by John Peel with a cover by Alister Pearson, published in paperback by Target Books and W. H. Allen in September 1989. An unabridged reading of the book was published as Daleks: Mission to the Unknown by BBC Audiobooks in May 2010 as a five-disc set, read by Peter Purves and Jean Marsh with Dalek voices by Nicholas Briggs.

Audio from the episode featured on the first CD of the five-disc soundtrack The Daleks' Master Plan, released by BBC Worldwide in October 2001 with linking narration by Purves; the first CD was distributed with the magazine SFX to promote the full set. In April 2010, The Telegraph printed vouchers for readers to obtain the CD from WHSmith. A library edition of the audiobook was released by AudioGO in 2011, and Demon Music Group published it as a vinyl record in March 2019.

== Recreation ==
After writing and producing his doctorate thesis about a 1960s-style recreation of the 2006 Doctor Who episode "Tooth and Claw" at Bournemouth University in 2012, Andrew Ireland wrote a proposal to recreate "Mission to the Unknown" the following year and brought it to the University of Central Lancashire (UCLan), but did not follow up; he specifically chose the episode as it was a self-contained story without any of the main cast. In mid-2018, when asked for an interview about his thesis by Doctor Who Magazine, he revisited the idea. By now an academic and Pro-Vice Chancellor of Digital and Creative Industries at UCLan, he obtained permission for the recreation from the BBC and Nation's estate, writing a passionate email to the latter, who were "very supportive". With a support team at UCLan, Ireland began researching the project around this time.

=== Production ===
The recreation was created in about five days in February 2019, and the multi-camera shoot was done in three days from 20 to 23 February. It was filmed in colour and converted to black-and-white in editing; the on-set camera monitors also displayed the image in black-and-white. Ireland, who directed the recreation, used both the original camera script and a newly-formatted one. He edited the episode by placing it atop the original's audio for the sequences to closely match. Several teams at UCLan worked in different departments, including costume design, fashion, make-up, and music; an external subcontractor constructed some of the sets based on the production team's designs.

Mandip Gill, a UCLan drama graduate who played Yasmin Khan in Doctor Who from 2018 to 2022, sent a video message of support to the cast and crew alongside Thirteenth Doctor actress Jodie Whittaker. Peter Purves and Edward de Souza visited the set, and the former used his social media platforms to publicise the production. Janette Rawstron, the recreation's lead make-up artist who taught Media Make-Up at the nearby Accrington and Rossendale College, considered Malpha the biggest challenge, as the heat of the lighting caused parts of the make-up to shift around. For the jungle set, Ireland borrowed a technique used in the 1982 Doctor Who serial Kinda, spreading foliage across the studio floor; these were required to be moved to the side for the Daleks to move. Foliage and pot plants were sourced from around the university and from productions like Coronation Street.

Nicholas Briggs portrayed the Daleks in the recreation; he and Ireland met in 2013. Briggs felt the Dalek voices in "Mission to the Unknown" and The Daleks' Master Plan sounded "a bit more like" actors Hawkins and Graham than the Daleks; he adjusted his ring modulator to avoid this, but attempted to recreate the original voices as closely as possible. James Burgess operated the Daleks and, alongside his father Mike, provided a blue-and-silver Dalek for use. In the recreation, Marco Simioni played Marc Cory, Dan Gilligan played Lowery, Jacob Marrison played Garvey, and Paul Stenton played Malpha. The Dalek set was used in one scene in the original episode, and later returned for use throughout The Daleks' Master Plan; however, due to the set's complexity and infrequent usage, the recreation uses models instead, with full-size close-ups for shots of the Daleks. The model shots were filmed some weeks after main production.

=== Release and reception ===
External videos
- "Mission to the Unknown" Recreation
- The Making-Of "Mission to the Unknown"

The recreation premiered on the Doctor Who YouTube channel on 9 October 2019 at 5:50 p.m., exactly 54 years after the episode's original broadcast. A behind-the-scenes documentary about the recreation, created by YouTuber Josh Snares, was released on YouTube. The Guardian's Martin Belam described the recreation as "effective", praising the Varga plants and Dalek death effect, but noted the source material itself was "a bit stilted, stagey and even slapstick at points", calling it "an interesting curiosity rather than a 'must see'". Erik Amaya of Comicon.com similarly felt the dated techniques "make the 25-minute story feel slower than it actually is" but this was "the whole point of the project", lauding the accuracy of the recreation. The episode was awarded a Special Jury Prize at the Learning on Screen Awards in 2020.

== Bibliography ==
- Cornell, Paul; Day, Martin; Topping, Keith (1995). The Discontinuity Guide. London: Virgin Books. ISBN 978-0-426-20442-8.
- Howe, David J.; Walker, Stephen James (1998). Doctor Who: The Television Companion: Volume 1 (2021 ed.). London: BBC Books. ISBN 978-1-845-83156-1.
- Howe, David J.; Walker, Stephen James; Stammers, Mark (1994). The Handbook: The Unofficial and Unauthorised Guide to the Production of 'Doctor Who'. Vol. 1 (2016 ed.). London: Telos Publishing. ISBN 978-1-845-83941-3.
- Muir, John Kenneth (1999). A Critical History of Doctor Who on Television. Jefferson, North Carolina: McFarland & Company. ISBN 978-0-786-40442-1.
- Pixley, Andrew (18 November 1998). Gillatt, Gary (ed.). "The DWM Archive: 'Mission to the Unknown'". Doctor Who Magazine (271). Royal Tunbridge Wells, Kent: Panini Comics: 22–25. ISSN 0957-9818.
- Walker, Stephen James (1994). "Background". In McElroy, John (ed.). Doctor Who: The Scripts. 'Galaxy 4'. London: Titan Books. pp. 9–16. ISBN 9-781-85286-566-5.
- Wright, Mark, ed. (2017). "Galaxy 4, 'Mission to the Unknown', The Myth Makers and The Daleks' Master Plan". Doctor Who: The Complete History. 6 (47). London: Panini Comics, Hachette Partworks. ISSN 2057-6048.
- Wright, Mark (May 2019). Hearn, Marcus (ed.). "Into the Unknown" and "Mission Accomplished". Doctor Who Magazine (537). Royal Tunbridge Wells, Kent: Panini Comics: 10–17. ISSN 0957-9818.
