= The Massacre (Doctor Who) =

022 – The Massacre
- Doctor Who serial
- The Doctor (William Hartnell) and Steven (Peter Purves) in a production still. (Note: No broadcast images from the original episode exist, leaving only production stills and off-air audio recordings.) Critics praised Hartnell for his dual roles in the serial and Purves for his leading performance.

Cast
- Doctor: William Hartnell – First Doctor
- Companion: Peter Purves – Steven Taylor
- Others: David Weston – Nicholas Muss; Eric Thompson – Gaston; Annette Robertson – Anne Chaplet; John Tillinger – Simon Duvall; Christopher Tranchell – Roger Colbert; Erik Chitty – Charles Preslin; Edwin Finn – Landlord; Clive Cazes – Captain of the Guard; Reginald Jessup – Servant; William Hartnell – Abbot of Amboise; André Morell – Marshal Tavannes; Leonard Sachs – Admiral de Coligny; Cynthia Etherington – Old Woman; Joan Young – Catherine de' Medici; Barry Justice – Charles IX; Michael Bilton – Teligny; Norman Claridge – Priest; Will Stampe, Ernest Smith – Men; Jackie Lane – Dodo Chaplet; John Slavid – Officer; Jack Tarran, Leslie Bates – Guards

Production
- Directed by: Paddy Russell
- Written by: John Lucarotti; Donald Tosh (4)
- Script editor: Donald Tosh (1–3); Gerry Davis (4)
- Produced by: John Wiles
- Music by: None (Note: The serial uses stock music by Pierre Arvay.)
- Production code: W
- Series: Season 3
- Running time: 4 episodes, 25 minutes each
- Episode(s) missing: All episodes
- First broadcast: 5 February 1966
- Last broadcast: 26 February 1966

Chronology
← Preceded by The Daleks' Master Plan	Followed by → The Ark

The Massacre (also known as The Massacre of St Bartholomew's Eve) is the fifth serial of the third season of the British science fiction television series Doctor Who. Written by John Lucarotti and Donald Tosh, and directed by Paddy Russell, it was broadcast on BBC1 in four weekly parts from 5 to 26 February 1966. In the serial, the First Doctor (William Hartnell) and his travelling companion, Steven (Peter Purves), arrive in France in 1572, during the events leading up to the St. Bartholomew's Day massacre. Steven befriends a group of Huguenots and encounters the Doctor's lookalike, the Abbot of Amboise (Hartnell).

Lucarotti wrote the serial after his previous outlines had been rejected. Tosh, the programme's script editor, significantly rewrote the scripts, leading to a co-writer credit on the fourth episode. He soon resigned, and it was his final credited work on the series. The Massacre marks the first appearance of Jackie Lane as incoming companion Dodo Chaplet. It is notable for being the first Doctor Who serial directed by a woman and the first time the lead actor (Hartnell) played a dual role. Purves was given a leading role in the serial as Hartnell was briefly on holiday. Filming took place at Riverside Studios from January to February 1966.

The Massacre received an average of 6.4 million viewers across the four episodes, dropping more with each consecutive week; it was the programme's lowest figures since the first episode in 1963. Contemporary and retrospective reviews were generally positive, with praise for the performances, direction, and script, and the serial was sold extensively overseas. Its videotapes and film prints were wiped by the BBC in the 1960s and 1970s, and it remains missing; a complete off-air audio recording survives, but it is the only serial with no known visual recordings. The story was novelised by Lucarotti, who restored much of his original drafts, and the off-air recording has been released as an audiobook.

== Plot ==
The Doctor and his companion Steven Taylor arrive in Paris, France, in 1572, where tensions between the Huguenots and Catholics are at fever pitch in the city. The Doctor heads off to visit the apothecary Charles Preslin. Steven enters a tavern and meets Nicholas Muss, a Huguenot. When the Doctor does not return as arranged, Steven decides to spend the night at Nicholas's home. En route, they find a frightened servant girl, Anne Chaplet, who is terrified after overhearing Catholic guards speaking of a coming massacre of Huguenots. To protect her, Nicholas arranges for Anne to go into the service of Admiral de Coligny.

The next day, the Abbot of Amboise sends his secretary Colbert to find Anne. Steven becomes convinced that the Abbot is the Doctor in disguise. He tries to track down Preslin but learns he was arrested two years ago for heresy. Steven overhears Colbert and an assassin plotting to kill "the sea beggar". As night falls, Steven finds Anne following him. They hide at Preslin's empty shop, planning to search for the sea beggar's identity. They call upon the Abbot but are forced to flee after Steven realises the Abbot is not the Doctor. After the Abbot is killed, Anne and Steven meet at Preslin's shop, where the Doctor arrives.

After discovering the date, the Doctor insists that he and Steven depart immediately, warning Anne to remain at her aunt's house. He and Steven reach the TARDIS and depart as the massacre begins. Worried for Anne and his friends, Steven is angry that the Doctor made him leave, but the Doctor insists that history could not be changed. When the TARDIS lands in 1966 on Wimbledon Common, Steven offers a terse goodbye and ventures outside.

The Doctor reflects on his former companions and his inability to return home. A young girl enters the TARDIS, shortly followed by Steven, whose heart softens when the young woman introduces herself as Dodo Chaplet; Steven wonders if she is Anne's descendant. The Doctor, hearing Steven's warning of approaching policemen, hurriedly dematerialises the TARDIS, not noticing that Dodo is still aboard. Steven informs her of possible danger but, with few ties to her home, she appears unworried as the TARDIS continues its flight.

== Production ==
=== Conception and writing ===
On 24 February 1965, Doctor Who script editor Dennis Spooner invited John Lucarotti to submit an idea for a historical story; he had previously written the first season's Marco Polo and The Aztecs (both 1964). Interested in a historical Indian setting, Lucarotti spoke to Waris Hussein, the British-Indian director of Marco Polo, who noted there were few interesting events prior to the seventeenth century and suggested the Indian Rebellion of 1857. (Note: Writer Terry Nation had previously researched the Indian Rebellion in 1963 for his unmade serial The Red Fort.) After speaking with producer Verity Lambert and head of serials Donald Wilson, Spooner was forced to reject the idea due to an edict that historical serials be set before 1600. Lucarotti suggested a Vikings story instead, and Spooner verbally agreed.

In early May, Spooner's successor as script editor, Donald Tosh, invited Lucarotti to submit an idea, unaware of the verbal agreement. By late May, Tosh met with Lucarotti and approved the storyline: Erik the Red's discovery of Newfoundland in 1002. On 8 June, Tosh and new producer John Wiles told Lucarotti that they wanted the series to become more menacing and mysterious; Lucarotti rewrote his storyline over ten days, speaking twice to an enthusiastic Tosh, and submitted the twelve-page outline on 22 June. Two days later, Tosh and Wiles rejected the story, considering it unsuitable and too similar to The Time Meddler (1965), which was in production. Lucarotti, supported by Wilson, tasked his agents to follow up with the production team, and Tosh agreed to discuss a new storyline. Wiles wanted the series to explore a religious conflict; Tosh suggested the St. Bartholomew's Day massacre, which Wiles approved, wanting the Doctor to witness history rather than interfere. On 9 July, Tosh commissioned Lucarotti to write the four-episode The War of God, due for 17 September.

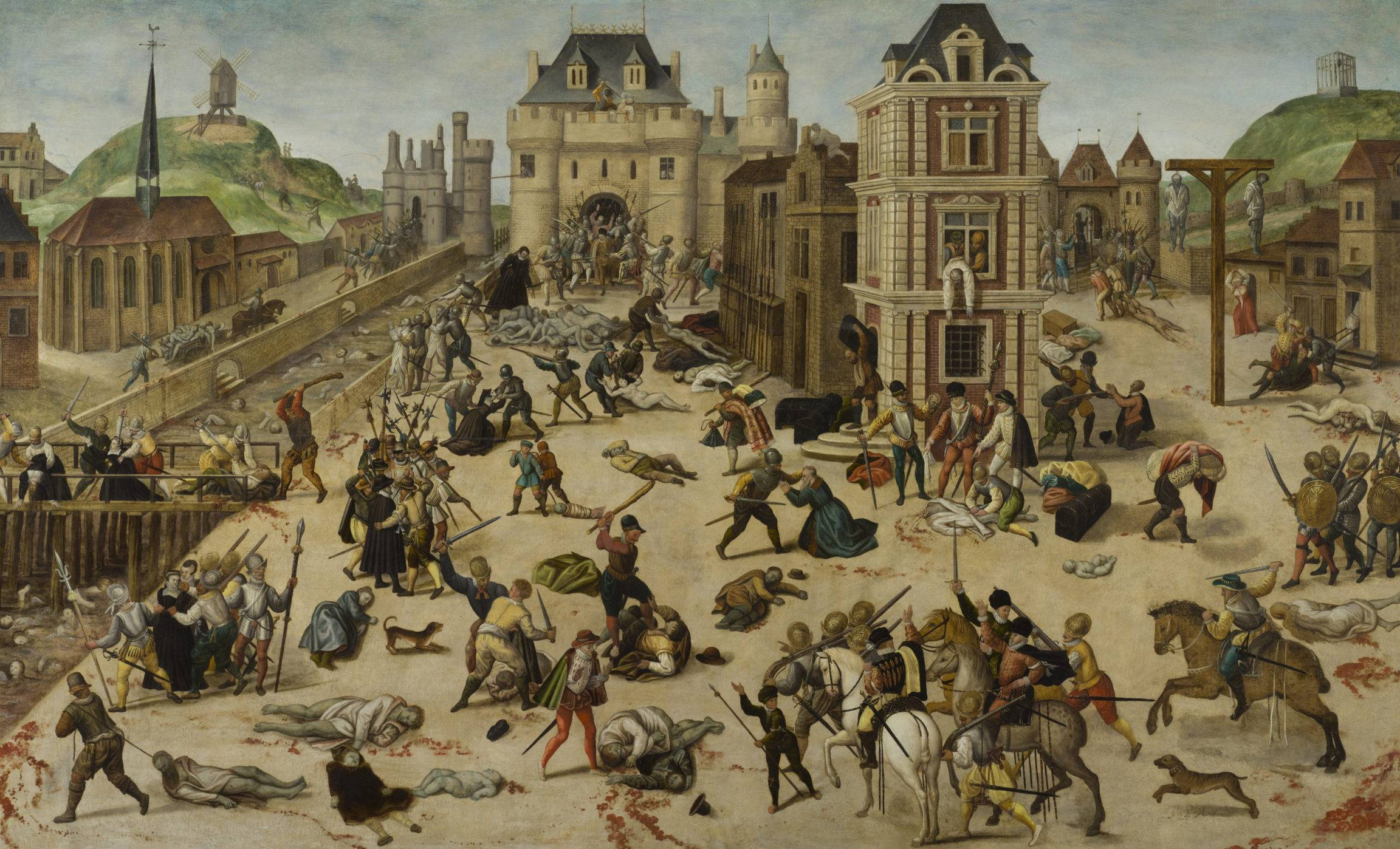
The serial depicts the St. Bartholomew's Day massacre.

Lucarotti submitted his scripts on 20 July, approved by Tosh the following day. By early August, Tosh requested second drafts; Lucarotti submitted the first two episodes on 28 September and the third and fourth on 6 and 8 October. Tosh formally approved the drafts on 15 November and paid Lucarotti in full, but subsequently made several edits; he was familiar with the subject matter and identified some mistakes, wanting to adhere to documented history and not misrepresent Gaspard de Coligny. He spent two days researching the period at the British Museum, followed by two weeks rewriting the scripts; Lucarotti asked for his name to be removed due to the extensive rewrites, though his agent dissuaded him. (Note: According to Tosh, Lucarotti's request was accepted and the first three episodes had no writer credits; no footage exists to verify, and internal documentation suggests that Lucarotti remained credited.) By late 1965, the serial was known as The Massacre of St Bartholomew, with the first episode titled "War of God"; the camera scripts were titled The Massacre of St Bartholomew's Eve.

Each episode's title card was superimposed over a camera shot of a print of seventeenth-century Paris.

Paddy Russell was assigned the serial's director on 26 November—the first woman to direct Doctor Who. She enjoyed the scripts and was apprehensive about working with lead actor William Hartnell but found him cooperative, acting as a sort of mediator between him and Wiles, with whom he was having disagreements. The serial's design work was originally assigned to Gwen Evans, then to Michael Young; neither had worked on the series before, and Young did not return. Though he remained during production of the following serial, The Massacre was Tosh's final credited work on Doctor Who, and he resigned from the BBC to work freelance; he had been unhappy with the series, partly due to his strained relationship with head of serials Gerald Savory, and discovered the vision of Wiles's incoming replacement, Innes Lloyd, differed from his own. In January 1966, Tosh handed over to his replacement, Gerry Davis, whose first credit was The Massacre's fourth episode; Tosh was credited as co-writer due to his significant rewrites. Lucarotti considered Tosh the serial's author.

=== Casting and characters ===
Hartnell had been interested in portraying a character besides the Doctor, suggesting a storyline in which he played the character's evil son; the idea went unused but Wiles was interested in similar experiments, leading to Hartnell's dual role as the Doctor and the Abbot of Amboise in The Massacre. The Abbot is a fictional character named after the 1560 Amboise conspiracy, a failed plot against François, Duke of Guise; the duke's assassination three years later was partly attributed by some to de Coligny. (Note: James Cooray Smith argued that the Doctor's similarity with the Abbot of Amboise was inspired by a real historical event: the impersonation in 1562 of the Abbot responsible for Marmoutier Abbey in the commune of Amboise by a man called Chastillon, who was later executed. He suggested that Lucarotti's original script (which no longer exists) involved the Doctor extensively impersonating the Abbot with the audience's connivance, whereas Tosh's preference was for the audience to be left unsure whether or not the Abbot was really the Doctor.) Tosh rewrote the scripts so Hartnell largely played one character in each episode, avoiding costume and make-up changes, and to account for Hartnell's holiday during filming of the second episode. Hartnell was credited solely as the Abbot in the second and third episodes, making them the only ones in the show's history in which the Doctor does not receive top billing. Russell occasionally told Hartnell when his performance as the Abbot leaned too heavily into the Doctor's mannerisms. Hartnell was concerned about the length of the Doctor's soliloquy in the final episode, but agreed to keep the full version after Tosh praised his performance during rehearsals; Tosh, who wrote the speech, considered it his "final signature on the programme" and wanted it to convey the show's "fundamental principles".

The Massacre had to introduce a new companion, following the loss of three in the two preceding serials. (Note: Vicki departed in The Myth Makers, while Katarina and Sara Kingdom died in The Daleks' Master Plan.) The first candidate was Anne Chaplet, a servant girl destined for death before being saved by Steven. Tosh and Wiles felt altering established history violated the series's principles and were cautious of introducing a historical companion after difficulties writing for Katarina. The script was rewritten to introduce Anne's descendant, Dodo, as the new companion, with similar character traits, indicating that Anne survived. Jackie Lane was cast as Dodo in early December 1965, contracted for thirteen episodes on 29 December (with an option for an additional twelve by May 1966). Years earlier, Lane had rejected Lambert's offer to audition for Susan Foreman, the show's first companion. Wiles had seen Lane's 1961 performance in the play Never Had It So Good and thought Dodo could use a working-class Mancunian accent. He wanted the character to change her hair in each serial, but Lane had her hair cut short before filming.

The Massacre is the first Doctor Who story to only feature a male companion—one of four in the show's original 26-year run. (Note: The three other stories to feature only a male companion are The Evil of the Daleks (1967), The Keeper of Traken (1981), and Planet of Fire (1984). All four introduce a new female companion.) Steven was given a leading role as a result of Hartnell's holiday, which Tosh partly considered an apology to actor Peter Purves for the character's weaker role in Galaxy 4 (1965). André Morell was cast as Marshal Tavannes in December 1965; he was subsequently offered a role in the film Daleks' Invasion Earth 2150 A.D. (1966) but his contract prevented him from partaking. Russell cast her friend Cynthia Etherington as the old woman in the second episode and former BBC employee Marguerite Young as both a Parisian extra and dog-walker in the last two episodes. Roy Denton was cast as "1st Man" but fell ill during rehearsals, replaced by Will Stampe after the third day; Denton remained credited in Radio Times, which had already gone to press. Of the serial's fifteen speaking characters, six are fictional (including the Doctor, Steven, and Dodo), while seven are real historical figures and two are based on real history; (Note: In comparison, there are 35 other depictions of historical figures in speaking roles in 1960s serials, none in the 1970s, and five in the 1980s.) none of the latter nine talk to the Doctor, and only two appear in the same scene as him—an intentional choice to avoid implications of historical interference. Purves felt the high calibre of the guest cast indicated the shifting tone towards the television industry at the time.

=== Filming ===
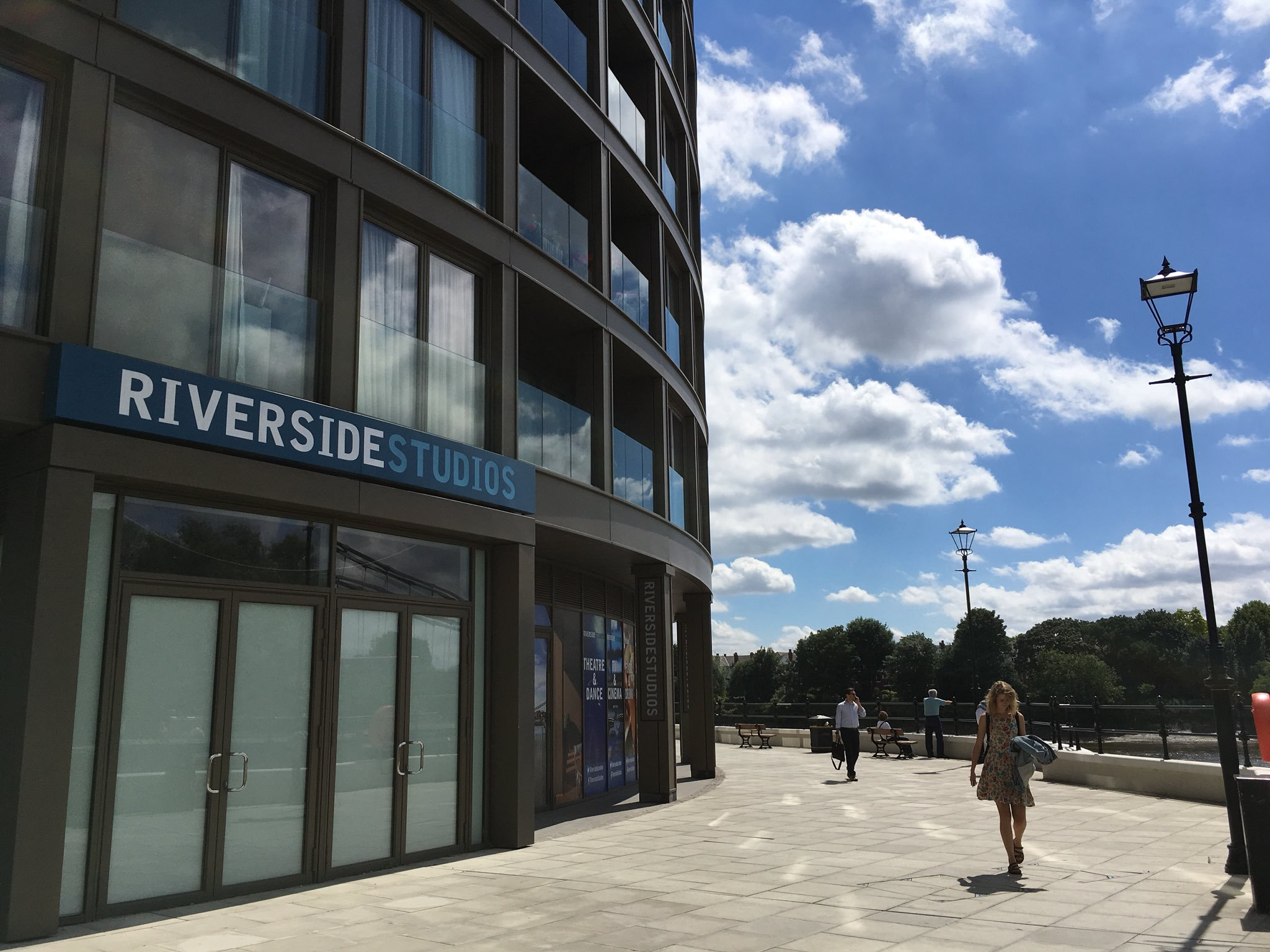
The Massacre was recorded at Riverside Studios (pictured in 2018).

Early 35 mm filming began on Stages 3A and 3B of the BBC Television Film Studios on 3 January 1966. Purves could not be released from rehearsals of The Daleks' Master Plan on 5 January (extra John Clifford doubled as Steven) though he and Hartnell were released the following day. The only location shooting occurred on 7 January for two inserts for the final episode: Dodo entering the TARDIS, and a woman watching it dematerialise. The former was Lane's first work for the series. A camera was mounted on a Citroën car for tracking shots of Dodo running towards the TARDIS; Lane had to jump across a ditch for the scene, and at one point fell in. For the second insert, it was hoped and scheduled for the scene to feature a cameo appearance of William Russell and Jacqueline Hill as former companions Ian Chesterton and Barbara Wright arriving as the TARDIS dematerialised; it is unknown if either actor was approached.

Rehearsals for the serial started on 17 January, and weekly recording began on 21 January in Studio 1 of Riverside Studios; it was the first serial recorded at Riverside for several months, the series having shifted to using the BBC Television Centre in the meantime. Each episode's title card was superimposed over a camera shot of a print of seventeenth-century Paris, likely depicting the Hôtel de Bretonvilliers. Paddy Russell employed the use of sound effects while filming for authenticity, including sounds of horses and carts for shots of city streets, birdsong for the apothecary, and a bell to signify curfew. The final episode was recorded on 11 February; several prints were supplied by the British Museum to depict the massacre. The first episode was budgeted at £2,825 and the rest at £2,425 each; recording ultimately cost a total of £10,268 (Note: The four episodes cost £3,576, £2,041, £2,632, £2,019, respectively.) (equivalent to £167,000 in 2025).

== Reception ==
=== Broadcast and ratings ===
Episode	Title	Run time	Original release date	UK viewers (millions)	Appreciation Index
1	"War of God"	24:51	5 February 1966	8.0	52
2	"The Sea Beggar"	24:43	12 February 1966	6.0	52
3	"Priest of Death"	24:33	19 February 1966	5.9	49
4	"Bell of Doom"	25:06	26 February 1966	5.8	53

The Massacre was broadcast on BBC1 in four weekly parts from 5 to 26 February 1966, returning to the programme's 5:15 p.m. timeslot. Viewership declined each week; the second episode saw a drop of two million viewers. It marked the second time (Note: After The Sensorites's fourth episode in 1964) that the series received fewer than six million viewers since the second episode in 1963, and its third time (Note: After The Sensorites's fourth episode in 1964 and The Daleks' Master Plan's Christmas episode in 1965) outside the top 50, falling low in the top 100; this was the start of a trend for the series throughout the year and decade. (Note: More than half of the 102 episodes preceding The Massacre exceeded nine million viewers; of the 147 episodes that followed, only two did so.) The fourth episode was Doctor Who's lowest viewing figures since its first episode, indicating a near-three million drop from the preceding serial. The Massacre was the first of six serials with three or more episodes (Note: The others are The Underwater Menace (1967), Robot (1974–1975), Warriors of the Deep (1984), The Twin Dilemma (1984), and Dragonfire (1987).) to consecutively lose viewers each week.

The serial was sold extensively overseas from the mid-1960s to early 1970s. (Note: Australia's ABC purchased it in October 1966 and aired it from December (and again from March 1968) before destroying the prints in July 1976, and it was broadcast in Barbados in January 1968, Zambia in April 1968, New Zealand from February 1969, Sierra Leone from December 1970, and Singapore from December 1972.) The 405-line videotapes of all four episodes were cleared for wiping on 17 August 1967, and erased soon thereafter, followed by the film prints by BBC Enterprises by 1974. The Massacre is one of three stories (Note: The others are Marco Polo and "Mission to the Unknown". Seven other serials are completely missing, but some brief clips survive.) of which no known footage survives, and the only serial with no known visual records at all, including telesnaps; only audio recordings and production stills survive. While original production forms titled the serial The Massacre of St Bartholomew and The Massacre of St Bartholomew's Eve, documentation from the 1970s shortened it to The Massacre, which has since become its common title.

=== Critical response ===
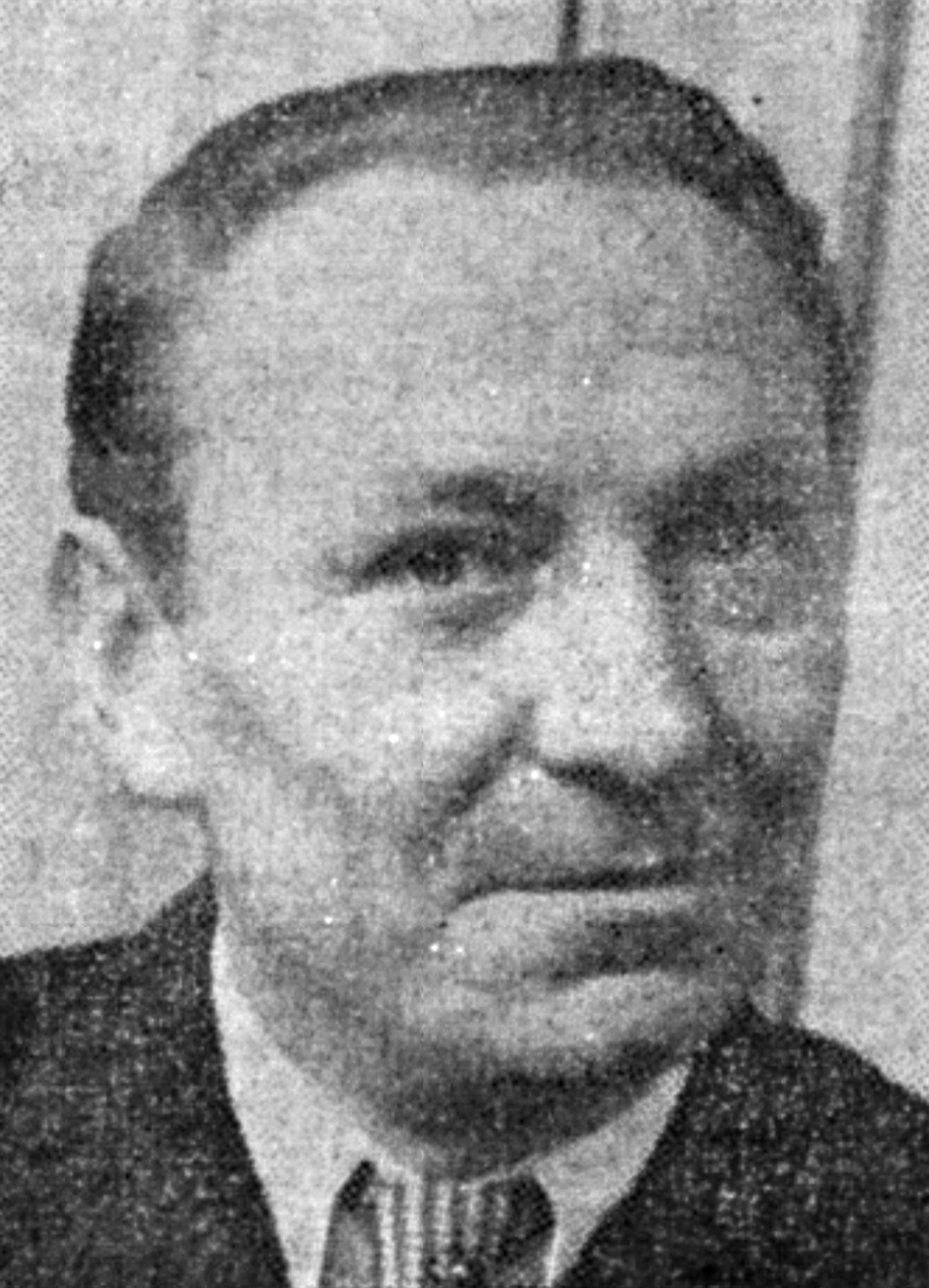
William Hartnell's monologue in the final episode received praise from critics.

The serial's Appreciation Index started at 52 for the first two episodes, dropping to 49 for the third and increasing to 53 for the fourth. At the BBC Programme Review Board after the second episode, Huw Wheldon noted that "quiet episodes" of Doctor Who were refreshing to watch. Huddersfield Daily Examiner's Peter Quince called the story "corny old history book stuff" in comparison to the episodes of Dixon of Dock Green broadcast the same week, and The Listener's J. C. Trewin found the fourth episode's use of woodcuts "a surely needless and nightmare-raising portfolio". He felt Hartnell performed his monologue "glumly" and described Morell as "looking sad and dignified".

Paul Cornell, Martin Day, and Keith Topping of The Discontinuity Guide named The Massacre "arguably the best ever Doctor Who story", lauding Hartnell and Purves's performances, the mature and serious writing of character deaths, and Dodo's introduction. David J. Howe and Stephen James Walker similarly praised Hartnell's intense performance as the Abbot and Purves's "excellent" lead role, as well as Russell's direction and Lucarrotti's scripts for their rich characters and interesting dialogue. John Kenneth Muir lamented the serial's loss due to Hartnell's dual role, though Doctor Who Magazine's Mark Gatiss felt it was "not quite the usual tragedy" as the existing audio "could almost have been written for radio", lauding the cast and atmosphere. Peter Haining called the serial "every bit as good as the BBC's more celebrated period extravaganzas" and Hartnell's monologue "a magical moment".

In 2017, The Telegraph ranked The Massacre as Doctor Who's tenth-best story for fulfilling the programme's educational remit, calling the Doctor's monologue "one of Hartnell's finest moments in the role". Doctor Who Magazine readers voted it the eleventh-best First Doctor story in 1998 and 2023, and the ninth-best in 2009 and 2014. Radio Times's Patrick Mulkern felt Purves "acquits himself admirably" as the lead among a strong cast, identifying Morell, Leonard Sachs, and Joan Young as standouts, and commended Hartnell's "profoundly sorrowful" soliloquy. Mark Campbell described the episode as "complex and engagingly downbeat", and Valerie Estelle Frankel praised Catherine de' Medici's strength, matching her historical counterpart. Deborah Stanish considered Steven's fourth-episode outburst one of the season's "most honest moments", enhancing the character's empathy. James Cooray Smith praised Purves's performance, though identified several inconsistencies in the Doctor's knowledge of historical events, likely as a result of the significant rewrites.

== Commercial releases ==
The Massacre
- Author: John Lucarotti
- Cover artist: Tony Masero
- Series: Doctor Who book: Target novelisations
- Release number: 122
- Publisher: Target Books
- Publication date: 18 June 1987
- ISBN: 0-491-03423-7

Lucarotti wrote the novelisation of The Massacre in five months in early 1986, the last of his serials to be novelised due to his dissatisfaction with Tosh's rewrites. It returned to a previous draft, reestablishing the Doctor's roles in the events, and introduced some new ideas; Lucarotti travelled to Paris several times to research for the novel. It was published in hardback by W. H. Allen on 18 June 1987, with a cover by Tony Masero, and in paperback by Target Books on 19 November. Target reissued the paperback on 17 September 1992, with a cover by Alister Pearson. An unabridged reading of the book was published by BBC Audiobooks on 11 June 2015, with narration by Purves and sound by Simon Power.

Using off-air recordings, an audio version of the story was released on cassette and CD by BBC Worldwide in August 1999, with narration by Purves; this was reissued as part of the BBC Worldwide's Doctor Who: Adventures in History CD box set in August 2003 and BBC Audiobooks's The Lost TV Episodes: Collection 2 in February 2011 (alongside digital copies of the original scripts), and was released as a vinyl record by Demon Records for Record Store Day on 18 April 2020. Library music from The Massacre was included on Space Adventures, a soundtrack album by the Doctor Who Appreciation Society, released on cassette in September 1987 and CD in October 1998.

A book-length study of the serial, written by James Cooray Smith, was published as the second volume of Obverse Books's The Black Archive series in March 2016. In 2019, Charles Norton, director of several animated reconstructions, noted that an animated version of The Massacre was unlikely in the near future due to the significant resources required, such as costumes and characters.

== Bibliography ==
- Britton, Piers D. (2021). Design for Doctor Who. Bloomsbury Academic. ISBN 978-1-350-11682-5.
- Brunt, David (10 May 2024). "The Making of Doctor Who". The Doctor Who Production Diary: The Hartnell Years. Telos Publishing. ISBN 978-1-845-83222-3.
- Campbell, Mark (2010). Doctor Who: The Complete Guide (2013 ed.). London: Robinson Publishing. ISBN 978-1-472-11038-1.
- Cooray Smith, James (March 2016). The Massacre. The Black Archive #2. Edinburgh: Obverse Books. ISBN 978-1-909-03138-8. OCLC 933337656.
- Cornell, Paul; Day, Martin; Topping, Keith (1995). The Discontinuity Guide. London: Virgin Books. ISBN 0-426-20442-5.
- Frankel, Valerie Estelle (2018). Women in Doctor Who: Damsels, Feminists and Monsters. Jefferson: McFarland & Company. ISBN 978-1-493-00016-6.
- Haining, Peter (1983). Doctor Who: A Celebration. London: W. H. Allen & Co. ISBN 0-491-03351-6.
- Howe, David J.; Walker, Stephen James (1998). Doctor Who: The Television Companion (2003 ed.). London: BBC Books. ISBN 978-0-563-40588-7.
- Howe, David J.; Stammers, Mark; Walker, Stephen James (1994). Doctor Who: The Handbook – The First Doctor. Vol. 1 (1995 ed.). London: Telos Publishing. ISBN 978-1-845-83941-3.
- Muir, John Kenneth (1999). A Critical History of Doctor Who on Television. Jefferson, North Carolina: McFarland & Company. ISBN 978-0-786-40442-1.
- Rigelsford, Adrian (1994). The Doctors: 30 Years of Time Travel. Boxtree Limited. ISBN 0-7522-0959-0.
- Smith, Paul MC (July 2021). Based on the Popular BBC Television Serial (4th ed.). Wonderful Books. Archived from the original on 19 August 2022.
- Stanish, Deborah (13 November 2012). "Anything Goes". In Stanish, Deborah; Myles, L.M. (eds.). Chicks Unravel Time: Women Journey Through Every Season of Doctor Who. Mad Norwegian Press. pp. 224–230. ISBN 978-1-935-23412-8.
- Wright, Mark, ed. (14 June 2017). "Galaxy 4, 'Mission to the Unknown', The Myth Makers and The Daleks' Master Plan". Doctor Who: The Complete History. 6 (47). London: Panini Comics, Hachette Partworks: 92–155. ISSN 2057-6048.
- Wright, Mark, ed. (13 June 2018). "The Massacre of St Bartholomew's Eve, The Ark, The Celestial Toymaker and The Gunfighters". Doctor Who: The Complete History. 7 (73). London: Panini Comics, Hachette Partworks: 8–37. ISSN 2057-6048.
