= High Treason (disambiguation) =

High treason is criminal disloyalty to one's country.

High Treason may also refer to:

== Film, television and theater ==
- High Treason, a 1927 play by Noel Pemberton Billing
- High Treason (1929 British film), an adaptation of Billing's play, by Maurice Elvey
- High Treason (1929 German film), a silent film directed by Johannes Meyer
- High Treason (1951 film), a British espionage thriller by Roy Boulting
- "High Treason" (The Adventures of Brisco County, Jr.), a 1994 two-part TV episode
- "High Treason" (BMF), a 2023 TV episode of BMF

== Other uses ==
- Act of War: High Treason, a 2006 expansion pack for the video game Act of War: Direct Action
- "High Treason", a 1966 short story by Poul Anderson
- "High Treason", a song by Memorain from White Line
- High Treason: The Assassination of J.F.K. and the Case for Conspiracy, a 1993 book by Robert J. Groden and Harrison Edward Livingstone

== See also ==
- High Treason Incident, a 1910 plot to assassinate the Japanese Emperor Meiji
- Treason (disambiguation)
- Traitor (disambiguation)
