= The Daleks' Master Plan =

1965–1966 Doctor Who serial

021 – The Daleks' Master Plan
- Doctor Who serial
- A photograph (Note: The only extant visuals from the seventh episode, "The Feast of Steven", are from home photographs of Robert Jewell, who portrayed Bing Crosby in the episode.) of the Doctor's address to the audience in the seventh episode, a self-contained comedic story broadcast on Christmas Day, which drew criticism from the production crew, viewers, and critics

Cast
- Doctor: William Hartnell – First Doctor
- Companions: Peter Purves – Steven Taylor; Adrienne Hill – Katarina; Jean Marsh – Sara Kingdom
- Others: Kevin Stoney – Mavic Chen; Nicholas Courtney – Bret Vyon; Brian Cant – Kert Gantry; Pamela Greer – Lizan; Philip Anthony – Roald; Michael Guest – Interviewer; Peter Hawkins, David Graham – Dalek Voices; Kevin Manser, Robert Jewell, Gerald Taylor, John Scott Martin – Daleks; Julian Sherrier – Zephon; Roy Evans – Trantis; Douglas Sheldon – Kirksen; Dallas Cavell – Bors; Geoffrey Cheshire – Garge; Maurice Browning – Karlton; Roger Avon – Daxtar; James Hall – Borkar; Bill Meilen – Froyn; John Herrington – Rhynmal; Clifford Earl, Norman Mitchell, Malcolm Rogers, Kenneth Thornett – Policemen; Reg Pritchard – Man in Mackintosh; Sheila Dunn – Blossom Lefevre; Leonard Grahame – Darcy Tranton; Royston Tickner – Steinberger P. Green; Mark Ross – Ingmar Knopf; Conrad Monk – Assistant Director; David James – Arab Sheik; Paula Topham – Vamp; Robert G. Jewell – Clown (Note: Revealed to be Bing Crosby); Albert Barrington – Professor Webster; Buddy Windrush – Prop Man; Steve Machin – Cameraman; Peter Butterworth – The Monk; Terence Woodfield – Celation; Roger Brierley – Trevor; Bruce Wightman – Scott; Jeffrey Isaac – Khepren; Derek Ware – Tuthmos; Walter Randall – Hyksos; Bryan Mosley – Malpha (Note: An uncredited Brian Edwards portrayed Malpha in the second episode.); May Warden – Old Sara (uncredited)

Production
- Directed by: Douglas Camfield
- Written by: Terry Nation (1–5, 7); Dennis Spooner (6, 8–12)
- Script editor: Donald Tosh
- Produced by: John Wiles
- Music by: Tristram Cary
- Production code: V
- Series: Season 3
- Running time: 12 episodes, 25 minutes each
- Episode(s) missing: 7 episodes (4, 6–9, 11–12)
- First broadcast: 13 November 1965
- Last broadcast: 29 January 1966

Chronology
← Preceded by The Myth Makers	Followed by → The Massacre

The Daleks' Master Plan is the fourth serial of the third season of the British science fiction television series Doctor Who. Written by Terry Nation and Dennis Spooner and directed by Douglas Camfield, the serial was broadcast on BBC1 in twelve weekly parts from 13 November 1965 to 29 January 1966. It was the show's longest serial until 1986 and remains the longest with a single director. (Note: The Trial of a Time Lord (1986) is a fourteen-part serial but was produced as four separate storylines within three production blocks, each with different directors and production codes.) In the serial, the First Doctor (William Hartnell) and his travelling companions Steven Taylor (Peter Purves) and Katarina (Adrienne Hill) become embroiled in the Daleks' scheme to design the ultimate weapon. They are joined by Bret Vyon (Nicholas Courtney) and Sara Kingdom (Jean Marsh).

The serial was commissioned due to the Daleks' popularity, and was preceded by an additional episode, "Mission to the Unknown". Nation shared the workload by writing six episodes while former script editor Spooner wrote the other six. The seventh episode's Christmas Day broadcast prompted the production team to write a self-contained comedic story, which ends with the Doctor addressing the audience. The Daleks' Master Plan is the first story to feature companion deaths: Katarina, proving difficult to write, was killed and replaced by Sara, who was also later killed. It marks Courtney's first appearance in Doctor Who ; he returned in 1968 to portray recurring character Brigadier Lethbridge-Stewart.

The Daleks' Master Plan received an average of 9.35 million viewers across the twelve episodes, an increase from the preceding serial but lower than the previous year. Contemporary reviews were mixed, with interest in the Daleks waning as the serial progressed and some viewers critical of its violence. Retrospective reviews praised the direction, writing, and production design, but criticised the serial's length, incongruous seventh episode, and violent deaths of female companions. The serial's videotapes were wiped by the BBC in the late 1960s; five episodes were subsequently discovered but the rest remain missing. Audio recordings exist for all episodes; they were later released as an audiobook, and the story was novelised in two volumes by John Peel.

== Plot ==
On the planet Kembel, the Doctor (William Hartnell) searches for medical aid for the wounded Steven Taylor (Peter Purves), whom he leaves with the Trojan servant girl Katarina (Adrienne Hill). The Doctor encounters Bret Vyon (Nicholas Courtney), a Space Agent. They discover the Daleks have established an alliance with galactic powers to conquer humanity by using a Time Destructor, a weapon that can destroy life on a planet by accelerating time. The Guardian of the Solar System, Mavic Chen (Kevin Stoney), has provided the weapon's power core, which the Doctor steals before escaping in Chen's ship with his companions and Bret.

The ship temporarily lands on a prison planet. After it takes off, a stowaway takes Katarina hostage. Katarina activates the airlock door and ejects them both into space, where they die. The ship returns to Earth, where Bret contacts his old friend Daxtar (Roger Avon), who unwittingly reveals he is working with Chen. Bret kills Daxtar, before being killed by his own sister, Space Agent Sara Kingdom (Jean Marsh), on Chen's orders. The Doctor, Steven, and Sara are transported to the distant planet Mira. Sara agrees to work with them, and they steal a Dalek ship. The Daleks force the ship to return to Kembel. The Doctor and Steven create a fake core, which they dupe the Daleks into accepting before fleeing in the TARDIS with Sara. They briefly land in a police station and a silent-era film set, and celebrate Christmas.

The TARDIS travels to the Oval, Trafalgar Square, a volcanic planet—where the Monk (Peter Butterworth) seeks revenge after the Doctor left him stranded (Note: As depicted in The Time Meddler (1965))—and Ancient Egypt, followed by Chen, Daleks, and the Monk who, forced to help the Daleks, takes Steven and Sara captive until the Doctor relinquishes the real core. The Doctor steals the directional control from the Monk's TARDIS. On Kembel, Chen captures Steven and Sara and takes them to the Dalek base. When he tries to give the Daleks orders, they turn on and kill him. The Doctor steals the Time Destructor, which activates. Sara ages to death, while Steven and the Doctor survive and reach the TARDIS. The Daleks try to destroy the Time Destructor but it kills them, wiping out all life on the planet. The Doctor and Steven remark on the senseless deaths of Bret, Katarina, and Sara.

== Production ==
=== Conception and writing ===
In early 1965, Doctor Who script editor Dennis Spooner asked Terry Nation to write a six-part serial featuring the Daleks, wanting to recreate the success of The Dalek Invasion of Earth (1964). The Daleks' return was expected to boost related toy sales in the Christmas period. Nation was granted an additional episode in February to act as a "trailer" for the serial, which became "Mission to the Unknown" (1965). Spooner departed Doctor Who in April to work with Nation on The Baron (1966–1967); his successor, Donald Tosh, commissioned Nation's six-part serial under the provisional title Dr Who and the Daleks in May. The BBC's director of television, Kenneth Adam, suggested the serial be expanded to thirteen episodes; head of drama Sydney Newman formally requested an expansion to twelve, to which producer Verity Lambert agreed if Nation and Spooner could share writing duties due to their work on The Baron. The twelve-part serial was confirmed by mid June. Lambert's successor, John Wiles, was unhappy with the extension and threatened to resign; Tosh, who was also unhappy, persuaded him to stay.

Following the extension, in July, Tosh commissioned Nation to write the first six episodes, and Spooner to write the remaining six; they soon swapped the sixth and seventh episodes, allowing each to write a cliffhanger for the other to resolve. Tosh advised Spooner to write standalone sequences to link to Nation's cliffhangers later. Nation and Spooner met to discuss the storyline but mostly worked independently; their outline varied in length, with two pages for the first episode, a paragraph for the tenth, and a brief sentence for the twelfth. Nation's six draft scripts ran to 150 pages; however, Tosh recalled that Nation's drafts were short—running to around 15 minutes each, with the seventh episode at 21 pages (far shorter than the average 45)—and required expansion. Spooner had more time to work on his scripts, and Tosh felt they required less work as Spooner was a former script editor. Nation's scripts were delivered in August, and Spooner's in September. The prison planet—Desperus, dubbed "Devil's Planet"—is a reference to Devil's Island, a French penal colony.

The seventh episode's broadcast on Christmas Day prompted the production team to write a self-contained comedic story, believing viewers would be uninterested in a complex narrative. Tosh was inspired to make the episode a parody of the police procedural series Z-Cars after one of its writers, Keith Dewhurst, turned down his request to write for Doctor Who. Enquiries were made about using four Z-Cars cast members (James Ellis, Brian Blessed, Joseph Brady, and Colin Welland) and production designer Raymond Cusick asked to use its set; Z-Cars producer David Rose declined as the production schedules overlapped and he felt a festive story did not match Z-Cars's tone. The Doctor's address to the audience at the end of the seventh episode—in which he says "Incidentally, a happy Christmas to all of you at home"—was written in the camera script, though Tosh and Wiles claimed it was improvised by Hartnell. Tosh criticised the address and felt it broke the audience's suspension of disbelief. 40 years later, Doctor Who introduced annual Christmas specials with "The Christmas Invasion" (2005).

By June 1965, Douglas Camfield was assigned to direct The Daleks' Master Plan. Tosh persuaded Wiles to maintain Camfield as the sole director after the serial was extended to twelve episodes. Camfield often rewrote elements of the scripts during rehearsals; Tosh felt Camfield's work on the scripts made the serial a success. Camfield asked Tristram Cary to compose music for the serial in July; Cary had worked on The Daleks (1963–1964) and the two had collaborated on Marco Polo (1965). Music was recorded at IBC Studios for the first six episodes on 13 October, and for the final six on 23 October. Brian Hodgson of the BBC Radiophonic Workshop created 48 sound effects for the serial in September 1965. Production assistant Viktors Ritelis was credited for the final episode at Camfield's request, as he felt he had helped immensely. Exhausted from production, Camfield decided he would not return to direct Doctor Who for some time. Production designers Cusick and Barry Newbery collaborated on the serial due to its length; it was Cusick's final story for Doctor Who, as he wanted to return to drama.

=== Casting and characters ===
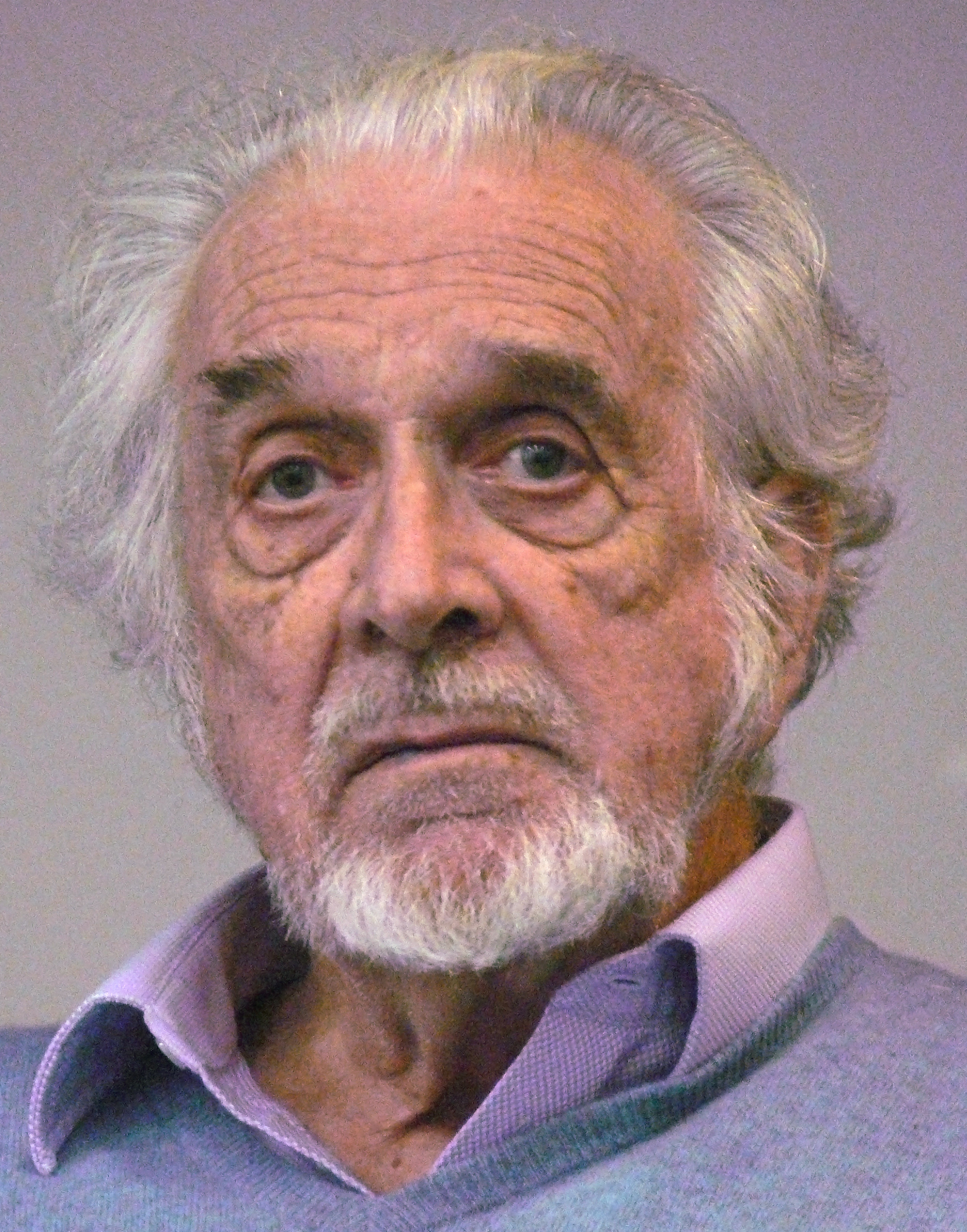
The Daleks' Master Plan marked the first appearance of Nicholas Courtney (pictured in 2010) in Doctor Who. He returned in 1968 in a different role, Brigadier Lethbridge-Stewart, who became a recurring character.

Wiles and Tosh decided the serial should kill new companion Katarina for shock value, as writers of subsequent stories faced difficulty fitting her in, and they felt viewers may be unable to identify with her. They decided she would be replaced by another woman, Sara Kingdom, who would be killed in the serial's climax. Katarina and Sara were the first companions to be killed in Doctor Who, and the only ones to do so on-screen until Earthshock (1982). Nation had intended for Sara to feature in an American spin-off series with the Daleks, but added her to The Daleks' Master Plan instead when the series did not emerge. Inspired by the character Cathy Gale of The Avengers, the scripts described her as "about twenty-five, very beautiful". She was originally written as Bret's lover, but was rewritten as his sister. Nation envisioned Bret Vyon as "the 007 of space". The frequent cast changes left Purves worried for his role; he felt he might be replaced by Nicholas Courtney.

Courtney, who had earlier been considered to play King Richard in The Crusade (1965), was cast as Bret in September. Courtney returned in the 1968 serial The Web of Fear to play Brigadier Lethbridge-Stewart, who later became a prominent recurring character in Doctor Who. The week after Courtney's casting, Jean Marsh—who had played Joanna in The Crusade, for which Adrienne Hill had been considered—was cast as Sara. Hill and Marsh's casting was announced in November 1965. Some character names were altered to reflect the story's futuristic setting; Bret Vyon was originally Brett Walton, and the prisoner Bors was originally Breton. The Egyptian characters Khepren, Hyksos, and Tuthmos were named after Chephren, Hyksos, and Thutmose, respectively. Make-up artist Joan Barrett shaved the heads of six actors portraying Chen's workers, the Technix, for which they were paid double.

Tosh expanded Mavic Chen's role when adding to Nation's draft scripts. Spooner requested the reintroduction of the Monk from The Time Meddler (1965), which he had written; he felt the character could provide humour and Butterworth's performance could alleviate Hartnell's work. Butterworth was keen to reprise his role. James Hall (cast as Borkar) had previously appeared in The Reign of Terror (1964), while Malcolm Rogers (who portrayed a policeman) was in The Chase (1965), and Roger Avon, Reg Pritchard, and Bruce Wightman (who played Daxtar, Man in Mackintosh, and Scott, respectively) had appeared in The Crusade. Sheila Dunn, who portrayed Blossom Lefavre, was Camfield's wife; they had married the preceding August. (Note: Camfield and Dunn's wedding was covered by media outlets, which has been attributed to the anticipation surrounding The Daleks' Master Plan and its director.) The cowboy was portrayed by William Hall, the Evening News's film critic who had been Camfield's best man at his wedding; the role was uncredited. Hall later married Jean Pestell, who portrayed a saloon bar girl in the same episode. Malpha, who had been portrayed by Robert Cartland in "Mission to the Unknown", was played by an uncredited Brian Edwards in the second episode and Brian Mosley in the eleventh.

=== Filming ===
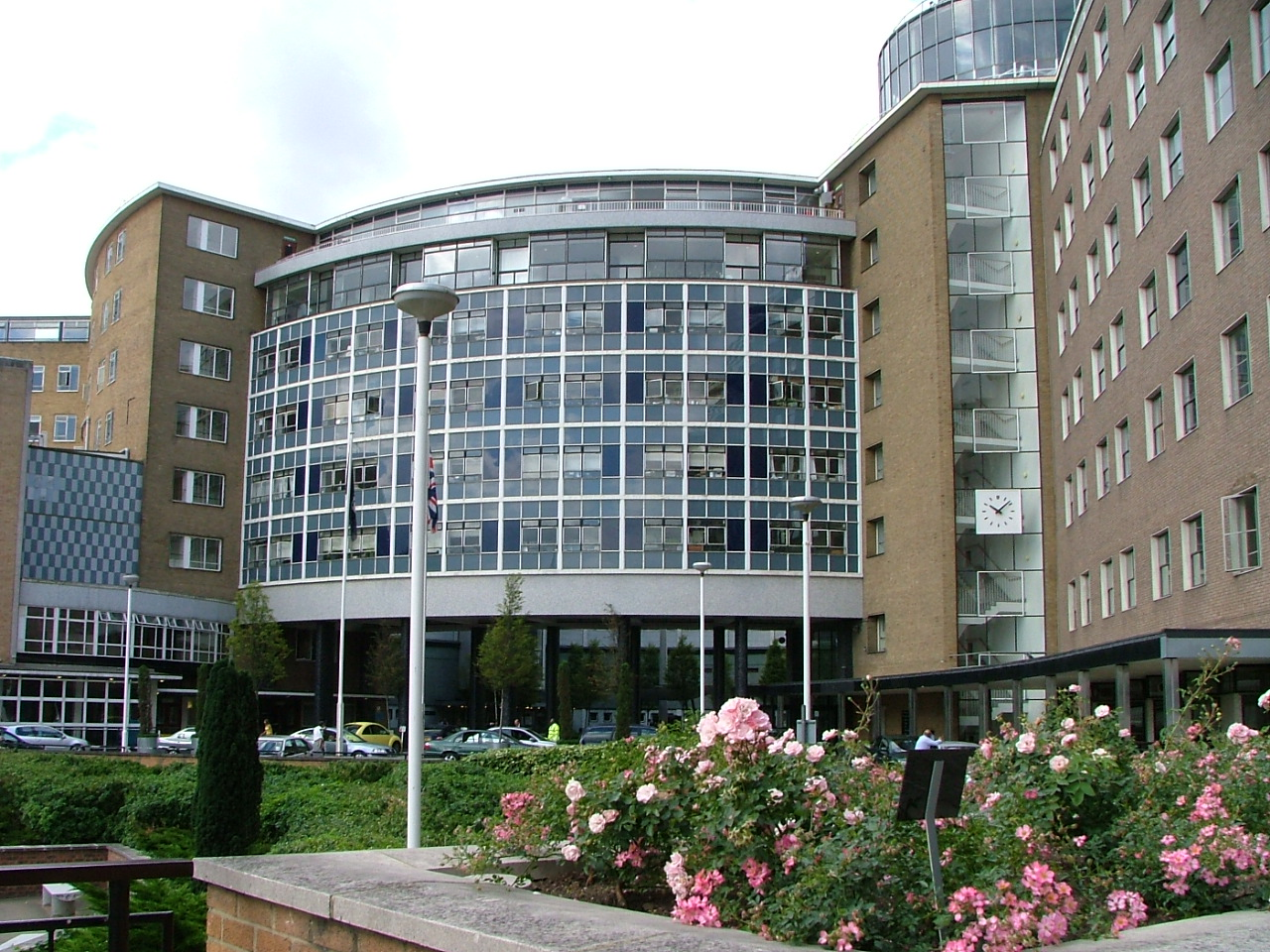
The serial was recorded at the BBC Television Centre (pictured in 2005) from October 1965 to January 1966.

Early 35 mm filming began on Stage 3A/B of the BBC Television Film Studios on 27 September 1965, including Katarina's death in the evening—Hill's first work on the series. Much of the model filming was delayed due to unavailability of props and sets. In filming Sara's death scene on 6 October, Camfield was inspired by Ayesha's death in H. Rider Haggard's novel She (1887). Rehearsals for the serial started on 18 October, and weekly recording began on 22 October in the BBC Television Centre's Studio 3. The first episode's recording ran under schedule, which Wiles attributed to difficulty in timing special effects.

Filmmakers at MGM Borehamwood, who were working on Stanley Kubrick's 2001: A Space Odyssey (1968), contacted the production team after the fifth episode's broadcast to enquire about Camfield's special effects shots, including floating corpses in space. Sam Rolfe, the American screenwriter known for creating The Man from U.N.C.L.E. (1964–1968), attended camera rehearsals for the ninth episode, and noted Daleks would likely be popular in the United States. Marsh became known for laughing during rehearsals; she was once banished from the studio until she gathered herself.

Hartnell's worsening health and sadness from Lambert's departure led to difficulties in his relationship with Wiles, prompting the latter to remove him from filming where possible; the Doctor was removed from most of the eleventh episode and his dialogue inherited by Steven. Hartnell became irritable during production, partly due to the removal of his usual chair during rehearsals; the crew temporarily walked out after he upset his dresser. Hartnell was upset by a last-minute script change in which the Doctor unlocks the TARDIS using his ring, a usage which he felt had not been established in prior stories. On 13 December, Hartnell announced he would retire from the role at the end of the season; he backtracked the following day, stating he would be willing to stay for another two-and-a-half years, at which point he hoped the programme would be broadcast in colour.

Rehearsals and recording were skipped in the week of 20 December due to the Christmas break. The final episode was recorded on 14 January 1966. Recording underran, which Wiles attributed to "policy reasons" requiring the removal of two shots of Sara's death. Both Tosh and Wiles had submitted their resignations from Doctor Who by the end of production in January 1966, Wiles partly due to his strained relationship with Hartnell and desire to return to writing and directing, and Tosh partly out of loyalty to Wiles and desire to do other work. The serial was granted an additional sum of £4,310, which was allocated to the first two episodes in addition to the standard £2,500 budget. Recording for the twelve episodes cost a total of £31,596 (Note: The twelve episodes cost £5,318, £4,031, £2,268, £2,448, £2,194, £1,914, £2,562, £2,265, £2,398, £2,391, £1,919, and £1,888, respectively.) (equivalent to £535,000 in 2025).

== Reception ==
=== Broadcast and ratings ===
Episode	Title	Run time	Original release date	UK viewers (millions)	Appreciation Index
1	"The Nightmare Begins"	22:55	13 November 1965	9.1	54
2	"Day of Armageddon"	24:25	20 November 1965	9.8	52
3	"Devil's Planet"	24:30	27 November 1965	10.3	52
4	"The Traitors"^{†}	24:42	4 December 1965	9.5	51
5	"Counter Plot"	24:03	11 December 1965	9.9	53
6	"Coronas of the Sun"^{†}	24:45	18 December 1965	9.1	56
7	"The Feast of Steven"^{†}	24:36	25 December 1965	7.9	39
8	"Volcano"^{†}	24:42	1 January 1966	9.6	49
9	"Golden Death"^{†}	24:38	8 January 1966	9.2	52
10	"Escape Switch"	23:37	15 January 1966	9.5	50
11	"The Abandoned Planet"^{†}	24:34	22 January 1966	9.8	49
12	"Destruction of Time"^{†}	23:31	29 January 1966	8.6	57

^† Episode is missing

The Daleks' Master Plan was broadcast on BBC1 in twelve weekly parts from 13 November 1965 to 29 January 1966. It was the longest serial in the show's history until 1986's The Trial of a Time Lord and remains the longest with a single director and production code. "The Feast of Steven" aired in a later timeslot than usual on Christmas Day, and "Escape Switch" was the 100th episode of Doctor Who broadcast on BBC1. Averaging an audience of 9.35 million, viewership saw an increase over the previous serial, The Myth Makers, but did not match the previous year's figures; the third episode received the most with 10.3 million viewers, while the seventh was lowest with 7.9 million. The Appreciation Index for the serial was considered "reasonable" overall, with the twelfth episode ranked the highest at 57; the seventh was ranked 39, the lowest for the series to date.

Until January 1973, BBC Enterprises offered an eleven-part version of the serial for overseas sale, omitting "The Feast of Steven", though no markets purchased it. Australia's ABC showed interest in purchasing the serial in September 1966 and considered editing out material deemed too violent or frightening, but by November cancelled the purchase as it considered censorship too laborious; the ABC's copies—originally stored in its Gore Hill studio, which was sold in 2003—may remain in Australia. The 405-line videotapes of the first, second, fourth, fifth, seventh, eighth, and ninth episodes were among the first Doctor Who episodes ordered to be wiped, on 17 August 1967. The third and sixth episodes were wiped on 31 January 1969, followed by the final three on 17 July. The only extant visuals from "The Feast of Steven" are from home photographs of Robert Jewell, who portrayed Bing Crosby in the episode.

Extracts from the third episode were aired on Blue Peter in October 1971. A 16 mm film of the fourth was loaned from the BBC Film Library to Blue Peter on 5 November 1973 (a 58-second extract of Katarina's death was shown) but never returned. The BBC retained 35 mm film sequences from the second episode; they were found to have gone missing by December 1991, but were later returned under an amnesty in October 1993. 16 mm film prints of the fifth and tenth episodes were discovered in the basement of the Church of Jesus Christ of Latter-Day Saints in Wandsworth in July 1983 and screened at the National Film Theatre: the tenth in October 1983 and the fifth in August 1989. Former BBC engineer Francis Watson returned the complete second episode to the BBC in January 2004, having taken it in 1973. The first and third episodes (Note: Four other episodes were also found—episodes 2 and 3 of The Daleks, episode 1 of The Web Planet, and episode 1 of The Chase—but they already existed in the BBC's archives.) were recovered by the charitable trust Film is Fabulous! from a deceased collector (Note: Film is Fabulous! became aware of the collector in 2023 and began negotiating to catalogue his collection. His death in 2025 left the collection subject to probate, which extended the process. The collector had no interest in Doctor Who, and his full collection included almost 6,000 films.) in 2026—ending the longest gap between recoveries of Doctor Who episodes, the last being in 2013. They were "cutting copies", intended for review before selling internationally. Purves (Note: Purves was one of two surviving cast members from the recovered episodes, alongside Pamela Greer. Several family members of late cast and crew members were present at the London screening, including Hartnell's granddaughter Jessica Carney, Hill's daughter Samantha Lee, and Camfield's son Joggs.) attended screenings of the recovered episodes, restored by R3Store Studios, at Riverside Studios in London on 4 April 2026, HOME in Manchester on 23 May, and Phoenix in Leicester on 19 August.

=== Critical response ===
As the serial aired, some viewers shared their concerns over the depiction of violence, such as the Daleks in the opening episodes and the violent deaths of Katarina and Bret in the fourth episode, and Junior Points of View viewers criticised Sara's death in the twelfth. The Stage and Television Today's Bill Edmunds criticised the seventh episode, particularly the Hollywood sequence, noting it "would have been much better with more chases, a few custard pies ... and less chat". After the eleventh episode, Edmunds wrote he was "losing [his] respect and awe of the Daleks" due to their consistent but unfulfilled threats. Following the twelfth episode, Daily Worker's Stewart Lane felt the programme was "definitely showing signs of age". Audience Research Reports demonstrated that audiences enjoyed the Daleks' return in early episodes, though interest began waning by the eighth. Hartnell's performance was criticised in the third episode, but his chemistry with Butterworth was praised in the tenth. Some enjoyed the festivities of the seventh episode but one viewer called it "one of the worst programmes I have ever seen". The twelfth was generally praised as a satisfying conclusion. Public obsession with the Daleks, dubbed "Dalekmania", saw a decline following The Daleks' Master Plan. Doctor Who Magazine readers consistently ranked the serial among the First Doctor's best. (Note: Of the First Doctor's 29 stories, The Daleks' Master Plan was ranked fifth in 1998, second in 2009, and third in 2014 and 2023.)

Retrospectively, The Independent's Kim Newman considered The Daleks' Master Plan "the most ambitious serial ever attempted by Doctor Who", and Doctor Who Bulletin's Ian Levine called it "an all-round masterpiece". Camfield's direction and Hartnell's performance was praised; The Guardian's Martin Belam enjoyed the former's claustrophobic closeup shots, and Radio Times's Mark Braxton called the latter's performance "one of his best". Patrick Mulkern lauded Hill's graceful performance, and Braxton appreciated the set design but criticised the seventh episode's audience address and the eighth's cricket scenes. Andrew Cartmel lauded Marsh's performance but found the story padded and Egyptian set unconvincing, and John Kenneth Muir considered the serial notable for its dark qualities and proving the Daleks' viciousness. Paul Cornell, Martin Day, and Keith Topping of The Discontinuity Guide appreciated its "epic" ambition but felt its plot "was worthy of six episodes at most", and David J. Howe and Stephen James Walker lauded the direction, writing, and set designs, though felt the story occasionally meandered due to its length. Deborah Stanish found the serial "clunky, tedious and nonsensical" but lauded its scope and ambition.

Critics and audiences praised Mavic Chen, including Kevin Stoney's performance, though retrospective reviews questioned whether his name and make-up were a problematic depiction of yellowface.

Daily Express readers voted Mavic Chen the "TV Villain of the Year" in 1965. Mark Campbell thought Stoney portrayed the character "to perfection", and Courtney and Purves lauded his performances in their respective autobiographies. Comic Book Resources's Sean Bassett found Mavic Chen a problematic depiction of yellowface, and Tat Wood considered his name reflective of Chinese and Mongol names. Radio Times's Braxton called his make-up "strange" but wrote his "indeterminate nationality counters any cry of racism"; he otherwise praised the character as "one of the great villains" of Doctor Who and lauded Stoney's subtle performance. Alwyn W. Turner felt, like the Daleks being modelled on the Nazi Party, Mavic Chen was based on Joseph Stalin, with the non-aggression pact inspired by the Molotov–Ribbentrop Pact.

The violent deaths of the two female companions in the serial received critical commentary. R. Alan Siler thought Katarina's sacrifice was inspired by the Doctor's helping nature. Rosanne Welch recognised Katarina's helplessness but felt her sacrifice gave her agency. Conversely, Valerie Estelle Frankel found Katarina's death the result of incomprehension rather than intention, describing her as "an exaggerated version of helpless companion". Frankel similarly appreciated Sara Kingdom's individual strength but wrote "her top quality is that she accepts orders unquestioningly", which ultimately overshadows her abilities and results in her death. Tom Powers found the deaths of companions like Katarina and Sara contributed to a disproportionate number of female deaths in science fiction, though recognised it was less noticeable in Doctor Who considering most companions are women.

== Commercial releases ==
The Mutation of Time
- Author: John Peel
- Cover artist: Alister Pearson
- Series: Doctor Who book: Target novelisations
- Release number: 142
- Publisher: Target Books
- Publication date: 19 October 1989
- ISBN: 0-426-20344-5

The Daleks' Master Plan was novelised in two volumes—Mission to the Unknown and The Mutation of Time—by John Peel with covers from Alister Pearson, published in paperback by Target Books and W. H. Allen on 21 September and 19 October 1989; the first volume also novelised "Mission to the Unknown". An unabridged reading of the book was published by BBC Audiobooks in two five-disc sets on 6 May and 3 June 2010, read by Purves and Marsh with Dalek voices by Nicholas Briggs; it was re-released as part of the Dalek Menace! set on 4 October 2012 and The Dalek Collection on 18 June 2020.

The fifth and tenth episodes of The Daleks' Master Plan were included on Daleks – The Early Years, released on VHS on 6 July 1992, with an introduction by Fifth Doctor actor Peter Davison. The second, fifth, and tenth episodes were included on the DVD set Lost in Time, released on 1 November 2004, featuring an audio commentary by Purves, Stoney, and Cusick. The first and third episodes were released on BBC iPlayer in the United Kingdom and YouTube in the United States on 3 April 2026.

Using off-air recordings, an audio version of the story was released as a five-disc set in October 2001, with narration by Purves. It was included, alongside digital copies of the original scripts, (Note: The original release of the set did not contain the scripts due to a pressing error; purchasers could request a replacement CD with the scripts included.) in The Lost TV Episodes: Collection 2 by BBC Audiobooks in February 2011, and was released as a vinyl record by Demon Records in February 2019. BBC Music released the score as part of Doctor Who: Devils' Planet – The Music of Tristram Cary in September 2003, and sound effects as part of Doctor Who at the BBC Radiophonic Workshop Volume 1: The Early Years 1963–1969 in May 2005. Some music tracks were included on Doctor Who: The 50th Anniversary Collection (2013) by Silva Screen.

The Daleks' Master Plan was adapted into a stage version by Nick Scovell, which was staged by Internalia Theatre at the New Theatre Royal in October 2007. Scovell portrayed the Doctor, while Briggs voiced the Daleks.

== Bibliography ==
- Bentham, Jeremy (1986). Doctor Who: The Early Years. London: W. H. Allen & Co. ISBN 0-491-03612-4.
- Bignell, Jonathan; O'Day, Andrew (2004). Terry Nation. Manchester University Press. ISBN 978-0-719-06547-7.
- Brunt, David (10 May 2024). "The Making of Doctor Who". The Doctor Who Production Diary: The Hartnell Years. Telos Publishing. ISBN 978-1-845-83222-3.
- Campbell, Mark (2010). Doctor Who: The Episode Guide. Pocket Essentials. ISBN 978-1-842-43348-5.
- Cartmel, Andrew (2005). Through Time: An Unauthorised and Unofficial History of Doctor Who. Continuum International Publishing Group. ISBN 978-0-826-41734-3.
- Chapman, James (2014). "Fifty Years in the TARDIS: The Historical Moments of Doctor Who". Critical Studies in Television. 9 (1): 43–61. doi:10.7227/CST.9.1.4. ISSN 1749-6020.
- Cook, Benjamin (May 2026). Quinn, Jason (ed.). "Lost, Now Found!". Doctor Who Magazine. No. 629. Panini Magazines. pp. 10–22. ISSN 0957-9818.
- Cornell, Paul; Day, Martin; Topping, Keith (1995). The Discontinuity Guide. London: Virgin Books. ISBN 0-426-20442-5.
- Courtney, Nicholas; McManus, Michael (2005). Still Getting Away With It: The Life and Times of Nicholas Courtney. Scificollector. ISBN 1-871330-73-4.
- Frankel, Valerie Estelle (2018). Women in Doctor Who: Damsels, Feminists and Monsters. Jefferson: McFarland & Company. ISBN 978-1-493-00016-6.
- Howe, David J.; Walker, Stephen James (1998). Doctor Who: The Television Companion: Volume 1 (2021 ed.). London: Telos Publishing. ISBN 978-1-845-83156-1.
- Howe, David J.; Walker, Stephen James; Stammers, Mark (1994). The Handbook: The Unofficial and Unauthorised Guide to the Production of 'Doctor Who'. Vol. 1 (2016 ed.). London: Telos Publishing. ISBN 978-1-845-83941-3.
- Keen, Antony (2010). "It's about Tempus: Greece and Rome in "Classic" Doctor Who". In Wright, David C. Jr.; Austin, Allan W. (eds.). Space and Time: Essays on Vision of History in Science Fiction and Fantasy Television. Jefferson, North Carolina: McFarland & Company. pp. 100–115. ISBN 978-0-786-43664-4.
- Kistler, Alan (2013). Doctor Who: A History. Lyons Press. ISBN 978-1-493-00016-6.
- Muir, John Kenneth (1999). A Critical History of Doctor Who on Television. Jefferson, North Carolina: McFarland & Company. ISBN 978-0-786-40442-1.
- Pixley, Andrew (16 December 1998). Gillatt, Gary; Barnes, Alan (eds.). "The DWM Archive: The Daleks' Master Plan". Doctor Who Magazine. No. 272. Marvel Comics. pp. 18–30. ISSN 0957-9818.
- Powers, Tom (2016). "A Muted Melody: The (Dis)Empowerment of River Song". In Leitch, Gillian; Ginn, Sherry (eds.). Who Travels with the Doctor? Essays on the Companions of Doctor Who. Jefferson, North Carolina: McFarland & Company. pp. 106–122. ISBN 978-0-786-49525-2.
- Purves, Peter (2009). Peter Purves: My Autobiography. Green Umbrella Publishing. ISBN 978-1-906-63534-3.
- Rigelsford, Adrian (1994). The Doctors: 30 Years of Time Travel. Boxtree Limited. ISBN 0-7522-0959-0.
- Siler, R. Alan (15 October 2015). "Magnetic North". In Lewis, Courtland; Smithka, Paula (eds.). More Doctor Who and Philosophy: Regeneration Time. Popular Culture and Philosophy. Chicago: Open Court Publishing Company. pp. 3–10. ISBN 978-0-812-69909-8.
- Stanish, Deborah (13 November 2012). "Anything Goes". In Stanish, Deborah; Myles, L.M. (eds.). Chicks Unravel Time: Women Journey Through Every Season of Doctor Who. Mad Norwegian Press. pp. 224–230. ISBN 978-1-935-23412-8.
- Smith, Paul MC (July 2021). Based on the Popular BBC Television Serial (4th ed.). Wonderful Books. Archived from the original on 19 August 2022.
- Turner, Alwyn W. (2011). Terry Nation: The man who invented the Daleks. Aurum Press. ISBN 978-1-781-31041-0.
- Welch, Rosanne (7 October 2014). Feminism in the Whoniverse. Cal Poly Pomona University Library. Archived from the original on 25 October 2020.
- Wood, Tat (2009). About Time: The Unauthorised Guide to Doctor Who (2nd ed.). Mad Norwegian Press. ISBN 978-0-975-94467-7.
- Wright, Mark, ed. (2017). "Galaxy 4, Mission to the Unknown, The Myth Makers and The Daleks' Master Plan". Doctor Who: The Complete History. 6 (47). London: Panini Comics, Hachette Partworks: 92–155. ISSN 2057-6048.
