= Treason (disambiguation) =

Treason is a crime that covers a variety of extreme acts against one's sovereign or nation.

Treason may also refer to:

== Film and television ==
- Treason (1933 film), an American Western directed by George B. Seitz
- Treason (1959 film), an Australian television film
- Treason (1964 film), a Greek drama directed by Kostas Manoussakis
- Treason (TV series), a 2022 spy drama

== Literature ==
- A Planet Called Treason, a 1979 novel by Orson Scott Card that was reissued as Treason in 1988
- Treason: Liberal Treachery from the Cold War to the War on Terrorism, a 2003 book by Ann Coulter

== Music ==
- Treason (album), a 1977 album by Gryphon
- "Treason", a song by the Bats from Daddy's Highway
- "Treason", a song by Kutless from Sea of Faces
- "Treason", a song by M. Pokora from MP3
- "Treason", a song by The Teardrop Explodes from Kilimanjaro

== Theatre ==
- Treason (musical), a 2023 musical

== See also ==
- High Treason (disambiguation)
- Traitor (disambiguation)
