= Traitor (disambiguation) =

A traitor is a person who commits treason.

Traitor, The Traitor or Traitors may also refer to:

== Films ==
- Traitor (film), a 2008 spy thriller starring Don Cheadle
- The Traitor (1936 German film), the English title for the film Verräter directed by Karl Ritter
- The Traitor (1936 American film), directed by Sam Newfield
- The Traitor (1957 film), a British film noir
- The Traitor (2019 film), an Italian film

== Literature ==
- Traitor (Star Wars novel), a 2002 novel by Matthew Stover
- The Traitor (Dixon novel), a 1907 novel by Thomas Dixon Jr., with a 1908 dramatization
- The Traitor (Walters novel), a 2002 Guy Walters novel
- The Traitor (play), a 1631 play by James Shirley
- The Traitor (1718 play), a play by Christopher Bullock, reworking Shirley's original
- The Traitor, a 2007 fantasy novel by Michael Cisco
- The Traitor, a 2007 spy thriller by Stephen Coonts
- Traitor (Daisley novel), a 2010 novel by Stephen Daisley
- The Traitor Baru Cormorant, a 2015 fantasy titled The Traitor in the UK
- Traitor, a 2015 novel by Jonathan de Shalit

== Music ==
- Traitors (album), by Misery Index
- "Traitor" (song), by Olivia Rodrigo
- "Traitor", a song by Motörhead from Rock 'n' Roll
- "Traitor", a song by Renegade Soundwave from Soundclash
- "Traitor", a song by the Sugarcubes from Life's Too Good
- "The Traitor", a 1979 song by Leonard Cohen from Recent Songs
- "The Traitor", a 1985 song by Minimal Compact

== Television ==
=== Series ===
- Traitors (TV series), a 2019 series broadcast on the UK's Channel 4 and Netflix
- Traitors (web series), a 2024 Russian documentary miniseries

=== Episodes ===
- Traitor (TV drama), a 1971 British television play by Dennis Potter
- "Traitor" (American Horror Story)
- "Traitor" (Captain Scarlet)
- "Traitor" (The Secret Circle)
- "Traitor" (The Transformers)
- "The Traitor" (The Amazing World of Gumball)
- "The Traitor" (Danger Man)
- "The Traitor", a season 2 episode of Dungeons & Dragons
- "The Traitor" (G.I. Joe: A Real American Hero)
- "The Traitor", a season 2 episode of Voltron

== Other uses ==
- Traitor (Thieves' World), a 1982 fantasy role-playing game adventure for Thieves' World

== See also ==
- Traiteur (disambiguation)
- The Traitors (disambiguation)
- Treason (disambiguation)
- Treta, a Sanskrit word relating to Hinduism
