= Paddy Russell =

British television director

Patricia "Paddy" Russell (4 July‌ 1928 – 2 November 2017) was a British television director. She was among the earliest female directors at the BBC.

== Early life and career ==
Born in Highgate, to Bertie Russell, a P&O clerk, and his wife, Alicia (née Quinn) It was only by including a stage management element to her course at the Guildhall School of Music and Drama that Russell was able to overcome her father's resistance to her pursuing such a career. She began her brief career as an actress while still a student working on productions supervised by Michael Barry who cast her in Toad of Toad Hall, and later in the same year in The Insect Play (both 1950). She became more interested in working in television than acting, preferring a three-week assignment in the medium over a ten-week touring production in Ireland.

She was the first female floor manager to work for the BBC, her non-gendered credit being a means of avoiding problems with prospective technical crews. Although she appeared in the first two episodes of The Quatermass Experiment (1953), her main role was a production assistant for television director Rudolph Cartier. She worked on the later Quatermass science-fiction serials, as well as the 1954 adaptation of George Orwell's novel Nineteen Eighty-Four. In the Studio 4 series, she appeared on screen in the Cartier directed Holocaust drama Doctor Korczak and the Children (1962) instructing the actors on the roles they were to perform. The production was made in the unadorned studio without sets or the actors in costume.

She progressed to becoming a director herself, one of the first two women directors in BBC television along with Julia Smith. She directed many television programmes from 1962. She became the first woman to direct episodes of Doctor Who when she directed The Massacre of St Bartholomew's Eve (1966). She directed three further Doctor Who serials: Invasion of the Dinosaurs (1974), Pyramids of Mars (1975), and Horror of Fang Rock (1977). The last two Doctor Who serials featured Tom Baker in the title role. She told Doctor Who Magazine: "Tom Baker was easy to deal with at first, but the part went to his head completely. By the time I did Horror of Fang Rock, he was desperately difficult to work with". Her other work included Out of the Unknown (1965), Pere Goriot (1968), The Moonstone (1972) and The Omega Factor (1980).

== Later life and death ==
By the 1980s, Russell was living in a cottage in Oxenhope, on the Yorkshire Moors near Keighley. She was working regularly for Yorkshire Television for whom she directed many episodes of Emmerdale Farm, the quiz programme 3-2-1 in its early years and the local news programme, Calendar. She was actively involved in charitable work in the area with particular emphasis on domestic cats.

Russell moved to a care home, where she died in 2017, aged 89.
