= Traiteur =

Traiteur may refer to:

- Traiteur (faith healer), a Cajun healer
- Traiteur (culinary profession), a specific type of French chef

== See also ==
- Traitor (disambiguation)
