= John Wiles =

South African novelist, television writer and producer

- Born: Edward John Wiles; 20 September 1925; Kimberley, South Africa
- Died: 5 April 1999 (aged 73); Surrey, England
- Occupations: Television writer and producer
- Known for: Doctor Who producer

John Wiles (20 September 1925 – 5 April 1999) was a South African novelist, playwright, television writer and producer. He was the second producer of the science fiction series Doctor Who, succeeding Verity Lambert.

== Early life ==
Wiles was born and raised in Kimberley. After serving in the army, he came to the United Kingdom in 1949, "partly motivated by career, but largely in protest against the newly instituted apartheid system". He had ambitions of becoming a writer or working in the theatre.

== Initial success ==
After four years working as a furniture porter while writing in his spare time, Wiles published his first novel, The Moon to Play With (1954), which was soon followed by The Try-Out (1955) and Scene of the Meeting (1956). At the same time his first TV scripts were produced by the BBC, a six-part spy thriller called The Dancing Bear (1954), co-written with actor/writer Richard Wade: they went on to collaborate on an episode of the anthology series The Vise in 1955. Wiles' stage play, Act of Madness, was produced in 1955 and the following year was adapted for TV in Britain and Canada.

In 1957 Wiles started working at the BBC's script unit, where his assignments included an episode of The Grove Family, the Saturday Playhouse entry On the Edge (1960), the children's drama Court of Mystery (1961) and various educational programmes. In the 1960s he script edited several crime and thriller serials, including The Midnight Men, The Massingham Affair (both 1964), Relectant Bandit and A Man Called Harry Brent (both 1965).

Alongside this Wiles worked in youth theatre, including productions at Turners Court school in Oxfordshire, which accommodated boys who required special attention. These plays would have very large casts, and these experiences went into his TV play Nice Break for the Boys (1963), which had a cast of 60. Wiles also continued to write novels, publishing The Asphalt Playground (1958) and March of the Innocents (1964) during this period, and plays, including Family on Trial (1957); his play commissioned for Coventry's Belgrade Theatre, Never Had it So Good (1960), proved controversial in the city.

== Producer of Doctor Who ==
Wiles was keen to move into directing at the BBC, but instead was assigned the producership of Doctor Who, a job he had little enthusiasm for. He would ultimately have one of the shortest stints of any permanent producer of Doctor Who, being credited on four serials between 1965 and 1966: The Myth Makers, The Daleks' Master Plan (which lasted for twelve episodes), The Massacre of St Bartholomew's Eve, and The Ark.

Although he had a good working relationship with story editor Donald Tosh, Wiles found that he was unable to make many changes to the format of the programme. Attempts to make the series darker led to clashes with actor William Hartnell who, as the sole remaining member of the original team, saw himself as the guardian of the series' original values. An attempt to give new companion Dodo Chaplet a cockney accent was vetoed by Wiles' superiors, who ordered that the regulars must speak "BBC English". With Hartnell increasingly in poor health and hostile to Wiles, the latter sought a way to replace the actor. However, this was again opposed by Wiles' superiors. Wiles also disliked the lengthy The Daleks' Master Plan story which had been commissioned by the previous production team and which proved difficult to realise.

In early 1966, Wiles resigned in frustration over an inability to steer the show in the direction he wanted, feeling that BBC management siding with Hartnell over him made his position untenable. Peter Purves, another member of the regular cast, believed Wiles resigned before he could be sacked. Tosh resigned in sympathy. Of the episodes from his tenure, only the four episode serial The Ark, and five episodes from The Daleks' Master Plan, still survive in the BBC's archives. As Wiles chose not to employ John Cura and his Tele-snaps service, only a few clips (sourced from both low-quality 8mm and higher quality 16mm film recordings), publicity photographs and behind the scenes stills give a visual record of his work on the series.

== Later career ==
After leaving Doctor Who, Wiles became a storyliner on the BBC soap opera The Newcomers. He returned to writing scripts for TV, including two episodes of Thirty Minute Theatre: Come Death (1967) and Walk in the Dark (1968), the latter produced by the man who had replaced him on Doctor Who, Innes Lloyd.

Wiles wrote two stories for the science-fiction anthology series Out of the Unknown, Taste of Evil and The Man in My Head, both broadcast as part of its fourth and final season in 1971. Although Taste of Evil was, like most of his work on Doctor Who, wiped and only still photographs are known to exist, The Man in My Head survived as its original videotape master and is available on the series DVD set. Wiles' other TV work included episodes of Paul Temple, A Family at War, General Hospital, Sutherland's Law, Warship and Poldark, as well as a 1975 adaptation of Noel Streatfeild's Ballet Shoes which won a BAFTA and an Emmy.

Wiles also continued to write plays, including A Lesson in Blood and Roses, which was performed by the Royal Shakespeare Company (RSC), and he published the novels A Short Walk Abroad (1969), Homelands (1980) and Killing Casanova (1993). Wiles died on 5 April 1999 at the age of 73.

Preceded by Verity Lambert	Doctor Who Producer; 1965-66	Succeeded by Innes Lloyd
