= The Traitors (web series) =

2024 documentary miniseries

- Narrated by: Maria Pevchikh
- Original language: Russian
- No. of episodes: 3

Original release
- Network: YouTube
- Release: 16 April – 1 May 2024

The Traitors (Russian: Предатели) is a Russian documentary miniseries dealing with corruption among high-ranking politicians in the 1990s. The TV series was made by Alexei Navalny's Anti-Corruption Foundation with Maria Pevchikh as narrator.

The Traitors has triggered a conversation about the 1990s in Russian society.

The stated aim is to explore how Russia lost its way in the years following the collapse of the Soviet Union. According to the filmmakers, the nation had the opportunity to evolve into a rules-based democracy, but this potential was not realized due to betrayal by those who were entrusted with the people's aspirations.

== Contents ==
The series raises many poignant themes of recent Russian history, including economic reforms of the 1990s, voucher privatization, loans for shares scheme, the "semibankirschina", Boris Yeltsin 1996 presidential campaign, Berezovsky v Abramovich case.

== Episodes ==
- "Part I. The Beginning"
- "Part II. The Family and the Oligarchs"
- "Part III. The Successor"

== Reception ==
The release of the documentary incited a wave of intense reactions from key figures involved in the 1990 reforms, alongside prominent intellectuals and journalists.

== See also ==
- Paul Klebnikov
- Yelena Tregubova
- Tycoon
