= Donald Tosh =

British screenwriter (1935–2019)

- Born: 16 March 1935
- Died: 3 December 2019 (aged 84)
- Occupations: Screenwriter, script editor
- Known for: Doctor Who

Donald Tosh (16 March 1935 – 3 December 2019) was a British screenwriter who contributed to Doctor Who in 1965. He was the last surviving script editor and writer from the William Hartnell era.

== Career ==
Before working on Doctor Who Tosh was briefly script editor on the series Compact, and had helped to develop the show that eventually became Coronation Street.

Tosh was the story editor for the Doctor Who stories between The Time Meddler and The Massacre of St Bartholomew's Eve, working with producers Verity Lambert and John Wiles. On Tosh's final story, The Massacre of St Bartholomew's Eve by John Lucarotti, Tosh performed a substantial rewrite of the scripts, both to align them with historical accuracy and also to accommodate William Hartnell's dual role as both the Doctor and the Abbot of Amboise. On the final episode the story editor's credit was given over to his successor Gerry Davis and Tosh was co-credited.

He also performed an extensive re-write of The Celestial Toymaker by Brian Hayles. Most of this work, however, was in turn rewritten by Davis. Tosh claimed that the Trilogic Game was the sole retention from his version of the script.

== Post Television ==
After leaving television Tosh worked for a time for English Heritage. He was Head Custodian of Sherborne Old Castle, Dorset and St Mawes in Cornwall. He retired to Essex.

In 2013 he appeared as an extra in An Adventure in Space and Time, a drama about the making of the William Hartnell era of Doctor Who, made to commemorate the show's 50th anniversary. The programme did not, however, depict a version of him as a character.

Tosh died in December 2019 at the age of 84.

Preceded by Dennis Spooner	Doctor Who Script Editor; 1965–66	Succeeded by Gerry Davis
