= Alister Pearson =

English artist and illustrator

Alister Pearson is an English artist and illustrator. He is best known for his work on the covers of Doctor Who novels, novelisations and videos.

== Career ==
=== Doctor Who ===
Pearson was born on the Isle of Wight. While still a student, he sent sample covers to Target Books, the publishers of Doctor Who novelisations. His first published work (an illustration for 1984's Doctor Who: The Key to Time by Peter Haining) was commissioned while he was still at school.

Pearson went to art college, left after only one term, and spent the next three years submitting Doctor Who covers to then Target editor Nigel Robinson and art director Mike Brett. His first cover commission was for the novelisation of The Underwater Menace. Pearson went on to produce many more novelisation covers, including first edition covers for all of the seventh Doctor adaptations (excluding Time and the Rani for which he later supplied a reprint cover) and a number of first and second Doctor covers such as the first edition of The Edge of Destruction.

Pearson continued to create covers for Target, including new covers for reprints of Doctor Who novels - some using artwork originally painted for the BBC Video releases - including An Unearthly Child and The War Games. When the novelisation line ended, Pearson was commissioned to create covers for the Doctor Who Missing Adventures; Pearson provided 22 of 33 covers for this novel line, working from the series' inception until Virgin lost the Doctor Who publishing licence in 1997.

Pearson's Doctor Who work was not limited to books. From 1986 to 1993, he provided covers and fold-out posters for Doctor Who Magazine and Doctor Who Classic Comics. He also produced sixteen covers for BBC Video VHS releases of Doctor Who serials.

In 2005, Pearson provided a frontispiece for Panini Books' Doctor Who Annual 2006. The next year, he created a cover for the same publisher's Doctor Who Storybook 2007, and other covers the following years for Doctor Who Storybook 2008 and Doctor Who Storybook 2009.

=== Other work ===
Between 1993 and 1995, Pearson also provided twelve covers for Titan Books' "Star Trek Adventures" line. There were reprints of Star Trek novels originally released by Bantam Books.

In 2007 Alister Pearson illustrated the cover for The England Quiz Book which was compiled by his old friend and fellow Doctor Who buff, Adam David Pearson (no relation) who also lives on the Isle of Wight.

=== Initials ===
Pearson is known for inserting initials into his artwork; his own ("AP" or "AJP") as well as those of his friends and colleagues in fandom.
