= The Chase (Doctor Who) =

1965 Doctor Who serial

016 – The Chase
- Doctor Who serial
- The Daleks battle the Mechonoids in the latter's city on Mechanus. The design of the Mechonoids and the battle in the sixth episode received praise from critics.

Cast
- Doctor: William Hartnell – First Doctor
- Companions: William Russell – Ian Chesterton; Jacqueline Hill – Barbara Wright; Maureen O'Brien – Vicki
- Others: Robert Marsden – Abraham Lincoln; Roger Hammond – Francis Bacon; Vivienne Bennett – Queen Elizabeth I; Hugh Walters – William Shakespeare; Richard Coe – Television announcer; Peter Hawkins and David Graham – Dalek voices; Robert Jewell, Kevin Manser, John Scott Martin, Gerald Taylor – Daleks; Ian Thompson – Malsan; Hywel Bennett – Rynian; Al Raymond – Prondyn; Arne Gordon – Guide (Note: Named Henry de Voort in a production document); Peter Purves – Morton Dill / Steven Taylor; Dennis Chinnery – Albert C Richardson; David Blake Kelly – Capt. Benjamin Briggs; Patrick Carter – Bosun; Douglas Ditta – Willoughby; John Maxim – Frankenstein; Malcolm Rogers – Count Dracula; Roslyn de Winter – Grey Lady; Edmund Warwick – Robot Dr. Who (Note: Though he appeared in the fourth and fifth episodes, Warwick was only credited on-screen for the latter; he was credited in the Radio Times listing for both.); David Graham – Mechonoid (Note: Erroneously spelled "Mechanoid" in the credits of the fifth episode) voice; Murphy Grumbar – Mechonoid; Jack Pitt – Mire Beast / Cabin Steward / Fungoid / Mechonoid (Note: Pitt portrayed the Mire Beast in the first two episodes, the Cabin Steward in the third, a Fungoid in the fifth, and a Mechonoid in the sixth. For the fifth episode, he was given last billing, prefixed by "with", without being credited for a specific role.); John Scott Martin – Fungoid / Mechonoid (Note: Martin played a Fungoid in the fifth episode and a Mechonoid in the sixth. For the former, he was given last billing, prefixed by "with", without being credited for a specific role.); Ken Tyllson – Fungoid (Note: Tyllson was given last billing in the fifth and sixth episodes, prefixed by "with", without being credited for a specific role.); Derek Ware – Bus conductor (Note: Ware was credited in the Radio Times listing for the sixth episode, but received no on-screen credit.)

Production
- Directed by: Richard Martin (Note: Douglas Camfield directed the still photography shoot featured in the sixth episode as part of the pre-filming work for the following serial, The Time Meddler.)
- Written by: Terry Nation
- Script editor: Dennis Spooner
- Produced by: Verity Lambert
- Music by: Dudley Simpson
- Production code: R
- Series: Season 2
- Running time: 6 episodes, 25 minutes each
- First broadcast: 22 May 1965
- Last broadcast: 26 June 1965

Chronology
← Preceded by The Space Museum	Followed by → The Time Meddler

The Chase is the eighth serial of the second season of the British science fiction television series Doctor Who. Written by Terry Nation and directed by Richard Martin, the serial was broadcast on BBC in six weekly parts from 22 May to 26 June 1965. Set in multiple time periods on several different planets, including Aridius, Earth, and Mechanus, the serial features the Dalek race travelling through time while pursuing the TARDIS and its occupants—the First Doctor (William Hartnell) and his companions Ian Chesterton (William Russell), Barbara Wright (Jacqueline Hill), and Vicki (Maureen O'Brien)—to kill them and seize the TARDIS for themselves. The Doctor and companions encounter several characters, including monsters Dracula (Malcolm Rogers) and Frankenstein's monster (John Maxim), human astronaut Steven Taylor (Peter Purves), and an android replica of the Doctor (Edmund Warwick).

Nation was commissioned to write the serial by story editor Dennis Spooner following the success of the Daleks in The Daleks (1963–1964) and its sequel The Dalek Invasion of Earth (1964); Martin was also chosen to direct based on his work on these serials. The Chase was the final work on Doctor Who by Martin as director and Spooner as script editor. The story was allocated a larger budget than normal, resulting in minimal budget for the preceding and following stories. A substantial part of the budget was allocated to the construction of the Mechonoids; they were given a press launch, and their merchandising rights were offered to manufacturers. The production crew coordinated with the Beatles's manager Brian Epstein to feature a clip of the band in the first episode of The Chase. Dudley Simpson composed the serial's incidental score.

The serial marks the final appearance of series regulars Russell and Hill, who depart in the sixth episode; their decisions, made independently, greatly upset Hartnell. It marks the first appearance of Purves, whose appearance in the third episode as Morton Dill led to his casting in the sixth as Steven Taylor, who later became a companion. Warwick worked with Hartnell to imitate his mannerisms as the android replica of the Doctor. Due to the variety of work, set designers Raymond Cusick and John Wood collaborated for the serial; Cusick redesigned some Daleks that had been modified since their original creation. The production crew sourced Dalek props that were on loan to various studios and companies, including for the film Dr. Who and the Daleks (1965). Filming for the serial took place at Riverside Studios from April to June 1965.

The Chase received high viewership, ranging from nine to ten million viewers, and successful Appreciation Index scores, though both were lower than the previous Dalek serial, The Dalek Invasion of Earth. Contemporary reviews improved as broadcast continued; the early episodes were found to be confusing and lacklustre, with the Daleks losing their appeal, though later episodes were praised for the battle between the Daleks and Mechonoids, the cast's performances, and the departure of Ian and Barbara. Retrospective reviews were mixed, with similar praise for the Mechonoids and characters, and criticism towards the comedy and unbelievability of some scenes and concepts. The story was novelised and released on VHS, DVD, Blu-ray, and as an audiobook, with music and sound effects released on CD.

== Plot ==
While Ian Chesterton and Vicki explore the Sagarro Desert on the planet Aridius, the First Doctor and Barbara Wright remain in the TARDIS. They see the Daleks embarking on a plan to follow the TARDIS to Aridius to exterminate the Doctor and his companions and seize his ship. Realising these events happened in the past and the Daleks may already be on Aridius, the Doctor and Barbara venture out to warn Ian and Vicki, only to see Daleks emerging from the sands after a dust storm. The Doctor and Barbara are saved by native Aridians and reunited with Vicki and Ian, who were injured after an encounter with Mire Beasts. The Beasts attack and, in the confusion, the Doctor and his friends flee to the TARDIS.

The Daleks pursue the TARDIS through time and space in their own vessel. The Doctor and companions stop atop the Empire State Building in New York City in 1966; after they leave, a Dalek appears. They are later mistaken for stowaways on the Mary Celeste until Daleks arrive and the frightened boat crew abandon the ship. In a mysterious old house, the Doctor and his companions encounter Dracula and Frankenstein's monster, who attack the pursuing Daleks. In the confusion, the group leave Vicki behind, unaware the monsters were actually robots in a defunct futuristic theme park attraction. Vicki stows away aboard the Dalek ship and witnesses them create an android replica of the Doctor, which is dispatched on Mechanus. Vicki reunites with the Doctor, Ian, and Barbara, but a fight ensues between Ian and the real Doctor once the robot duplicate appears, claiming to be the original. When the robot Doctor mistakenly refers to Vicki as his granddaughter Susan, Barbara realises and the real Doctor disables the robot.

As the Doctor and his companions venture into a metal city above the jungle, Mechonoids imprison them with shipwrecked human astronaut Steven Taylor. Under the cover of the Daleks' attack on the city, the Doctor and his companions escape. Upon discovering the Dalek time machine and considering it more reliable than the TARDIS, Ian and Barbara persuade the Doctor to help them operate it to return to London in their own time. Upon arriving in London, 1965, Ian and Barbara set the time machine to auto-destruct. The Doctor says that he will miss Ian and Barbara, and he and Vicki depart in the TARDIS.

== Production ==
=== Conception and writing ===
Following the success of the Daleks in their introductory serial The Daleks (1963–1964) and its sequel The Dalek Invasion of Earth (1964), writer Terry Nation was quickly commissioned to write a third serial by new story editor Dennis Spooner, with whom he was old friends due to their history of comedy writing. Nation's original story pitch was scrapped for unknown reasons, and he was instead commissioned to write a six-episode Dalek serial, tentatively titled Doctor Who and the Daleks (III), around mid-December 1964. Nation submitted a five-page synopsis on 10 January 1965 to producer Verity Lambert, aware of the fact that it would be a more expensive production than typical. In Nation's synopsis, the story was known as Dr Who (Segment: Dalek Three) – The Pursuers; a few months later, it became The Chase. Nation wrote the scripts between writing episodes of The Saint (1962–1969). In the first episode's script, Nation suggested the footage of the Gettysburg Address could be borrowed from the 1962 film How the West Was Won. Nation's scripts required little editing from Spooner, though he was too busy to undertake rewrites regardless.

Original alternatives to the planet Aridius included ancient Egypt, wherein the first pyramid is built over the location of a destroyed Dalek, and the planet Stygian, where the variable light waves render all living matter invisible. One of the few elements edited by Spooner included the Time-Space Visualiser; gifted by the Xerons to the Doctor at the end of The Space Museum (1965), the machine was added to The Chase to maintain continuity between stories—before this rewrite, the device was previously known as a Time Curve Visi-Scope and was invented by the Doctor. Spooner also changed the scene in which Ian and Vicki enter the tunnels in the first episode; in the original draft, they were dragged down by a colony of Mire Beasts. An external model sequence of the haunted house in the fourth episode was cut from the script when the reasoning behind the sequence—taking place in a futuristic theme park attraction as opposed to inside the minds of its occupants—was changed. In a draft script, the city from the fifth episode was referred to as "a real Frank Lloyd Wright edifice".

An early intention was for the first episode to feature the Beatles, dressed as old men, performing in the studio as part of a fictional 50th anniversary concert; the idea was rejected by the band's manager, Brian Epstein, who thought it would be poor for the group's image. The production team enquired about obtaining material of the Beatles from Top of the Pops, but discovered that most episodes had been wiped after broadcasting; they were offered a November 1964 recording of "I Feel Fine" at Riverside Studio. However, after the group performed their new song "Ticket to Ride" on Top of the Pops in April, Epstein consented to one minute of its usage on the show. This had the unintended effect of making the first episode of The Chase the only remaining source of any surviving Beatles footage from Top of the Pops, as much of the show was wiped.

=== Directing and music ===
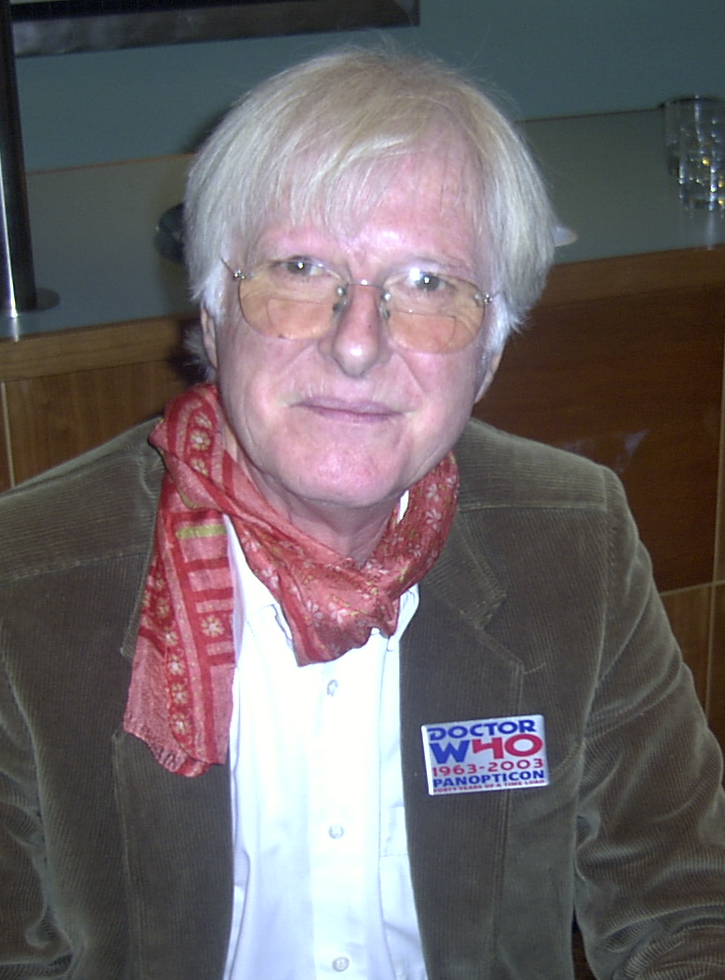
Richard Martin (pictured in 2003), who had become known as the "Dalek director" for his work on previous Dalek serials, was chosen to direct The Chase.

Richard Martin was chosen to direct the serial; he was reluctant to agree, but Lambert convinced him as he had become known as the "Dalek director", having directed both The Daleks and The Dalek Invasion of Earth. Lambert sent the scripts to Martin on 25 February 1965, pleased with their action but concerned about potential production drawbacks; she was primarily concerned with the Mire Beast and Fungoids, having struggled with creatures like the Slyther in The Dalek Invasion of Earth. She was also unhappy about the existence of Frankenstein's monster in the story, concerned that it did not present the concept in a logical way as in previous stories, and that it showed a lack of imagination to use other fictional characters.

Lambert asked Martin to keep expenses to a minimum, but, recalling the overspend on his previous serial The Web Planet (1965), allocated a larger budget than normal; as a result, the preceding and following serials—The Space Museum and The Time Meddler, respectively—were produced with a minimal budget and little pre-filming. Despite this, Martin still believed the show was underfunded, and considered it poor science fiction television. He was frustrated that he was unable to overcome production challenges to his liking; The Chase would ultimately be his final work on the show. It was also Spooner's final serial as story editor, having been offered the position of co-writer and assistant editor on The Baron (1966–1967) by Nation; Spooner was eager to work on a high-quality program with expected American viewership.

The serial's incidental music was composed by Dudley Simpson; Martin had originally wanted Max Harris to compose the score. To detract from the Daleks' scariness, Simpson was asked to compose "light" music; recording took place at Olympic Sound Studios on 20 April for the first three episodes and 23 April for the last three. The score, performed by five musicians conducted by Simpson, consisted of 52 cues and ran for over 25 minutes. Thirty new sounds were created for the serial by Brian Hodgson of the BBC Radiophonic Workshop. The voice of the Mechonoid, performed by the voice of the Daleks David Graham, was edited by Hodgson and Ray Angel; they sped up the sound, broke it up, and added a continuous note. Nation had suggested producing the Mechonoids' voices akin to Sparky's Magic Piano.

=== Sets and design ===
Due to the variety of work required, set designers Raymond Cusick and John Wood both worked on The Chase; Cusick focused on the Daleks' time machine, the Mechonoid city, and the haunted house, while Wood concentrated on the Empire State Building and the Mary Celeste. A substantial part of the serial's budget was allocated to the construction of the Mechonoids, with a total cost of £812. Cusick was inspired by the designs of Richard Buckminster Fuller; the expensive models, which used three two-part fibreglass casings, were made by Shawcraft Models and completed in March 1965. Like the Daleks, they were designed to be controlled by a hidden operator inside the casing. William Hartnell disliked the need to be precise with his movements around the props. The Mechonoids were too large to maintain after production; a Fungoid and the Mire Beast were kept, later appearing in a display at an exhibition in 1967. With production approaching, the crew noted it needed to use the two Dalek props on loan to Belle Vue Zoo by early March. They also enquired into loaning the two Daleks given to the Dr. Barnardo's home in Ilford, Essex; when Dr. Barnardo's indicated the props could only be used for a few days at the end of April, the crew decided to proceed without them. Other Dalek props were sourced from Ealing Studios, and from original manufacturer Shawcraft Models in Uxbridge; at the time, another prop was on loan to a different BBC production, thought to be an episode of Hugh and I, "Bun Fight", which aired on 11 April 1965.

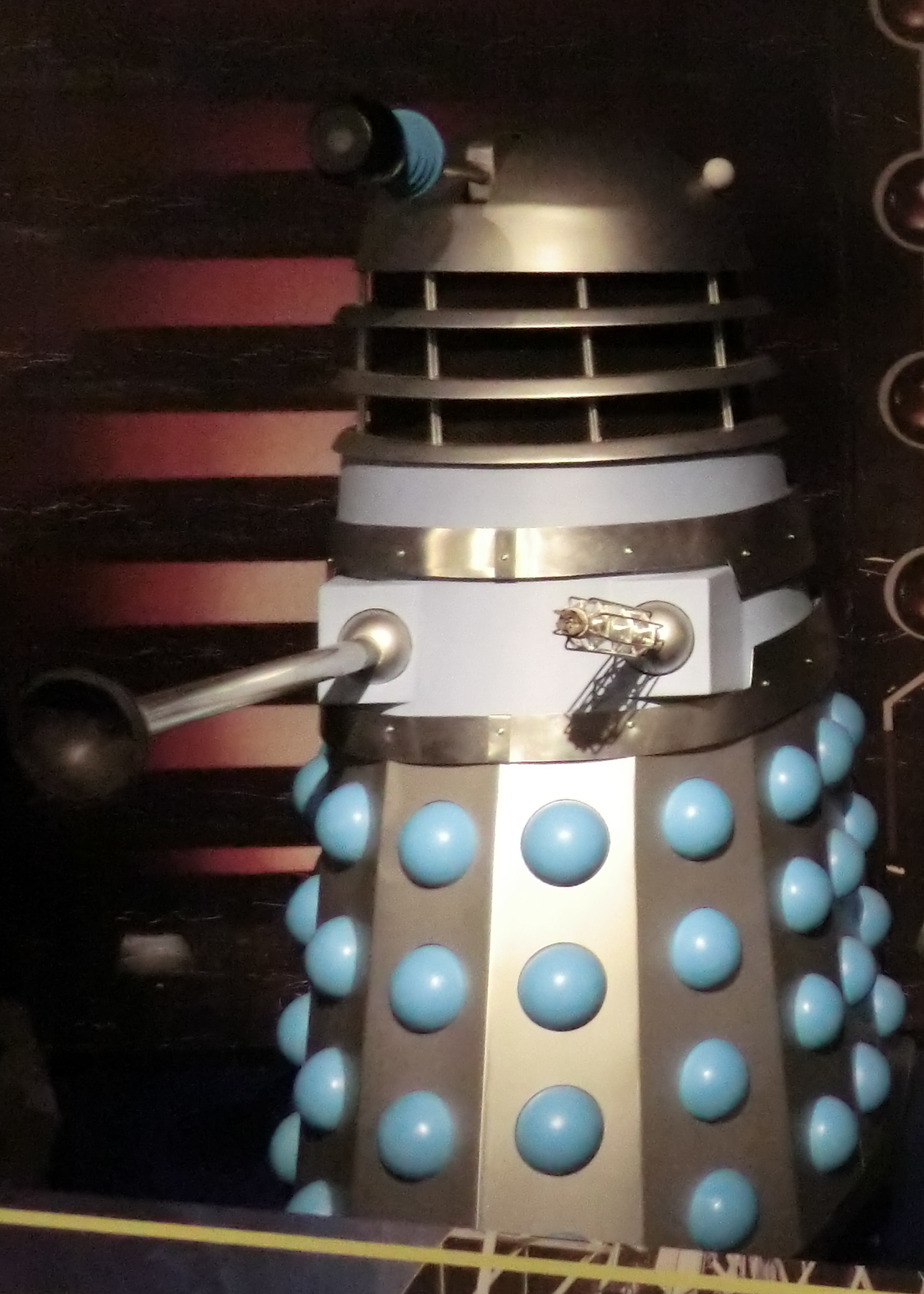
The production crew sourced Dalek props that were on loan to various studios and companies.

Four of the Daleks owned by the BBC were refurbished, costing £118; of this, the Publicity Department, which had been using the props extensively for promotional purposes, paid £100. Cusick disliked the modifications made on the Dalek casings by Spencer Chapman on The Dalek Invasion of Earth; Cusick redesigned the casings, removing the fenders and power dishes and adding shoulder slats to the midriff section. The black Dalek Supreme from The Dalek Invasion of Earth was painted silver for The Chase. Cusick also designed a lightweight prop, referred to as a "hover Dalek", which could appear to move rapidly over the sands; it was operated by Gerald Taylor. For the final shot of the first episode, Cusick and his team buried a Dalek in the sand and attached it to a Land Rover vehicle via rope; however, the casing did not rise through the sand, forcing the team to reconsider the effect. Cusick and Shawcraft Models ultimately built an 18-inch Dalek puppet operated from underneath. Cusick designed the Daleks' control room from pieces of sets from The Daleks and The Dalek Invasion of Earth. The Dalek ship in the third episode was populated by several Dalek props, including three unoccupied casings from the film Dr. Who and the Daleks (1965). Martin contacted the film's writer and producer Milton Subotsky and asked to borrow some of the casings built for the movie, which had recently completed production; Subotsky offered Martin eight Dalek props, but as they were noticeably different from their television counterparts, three were used in the background to populate the shots.

The interior TARDIS rooms were designed from material originally designed by Cusick for The Edge of Destruction (1964), with equipment bay elements from The Web Planet. The Time-Space Visualiser was constructed by Shawcraft Models and used a television monitor, on which the footage was played. The TARDIS control room set was used for the Visualiser sequence, though the console was not used due to size. The first episode marks the first time in Doctor Who that the TARDIS was seen in flight; the effect was achieved by mixing a kaleidoscope shot of stars with a shot of a two-inch TARDIS model. The Mire Beast costume, worn by Jack Pitt, was constructed by freelance specialist props team, father and son John and Jack Lovell; John researched similar creatures at the Natural History Museum, which led to the final orange costume made of sheet rubber. The Lovells also designed the rubber Fungoid costumes, which were nicknamed Fungoid Fred, Mushroom Malone, and Toadstool Taffy. The establishing shot of the Aridian landscape was a photograph of the Kalahari Desert in Bechuanaland from Paul Popper Ltd, while the shot of Mechanus was a photograph of an Amazonian jungle from Fox Photos. The food being eaten by Barbara and Vicki in the third episode were Mars bars, twelve of which were purchased for production. The set for the ship in the third episode was large, with several levels. One of Martin's favourite parts of the serial, the ship used much of the budget. The name plate of the ship was erroneously painted as Marie Celeste before being corrected to Mary Celeste.

Lambert was unsatisfied with the set of the Empire State Building; she complained to the design department's Barry Learoyd on 26 May, and wrote "even bearing in mind the necessary economy because of the budget, this is pretty poor by any standards". Learoyd responded on 9 June, noting the set looked satisfactory in the transmission and clarifying she had likely seen the set before its final tidying; Lambert conceded, but noted the set only appeared satisfactory due to alteration in shots by Martin, who had placed the TARDIS in a different spot than planned to avoid showing too much of the set. The jungle set from the fifth episode, designed by Wood, used hanging gauzes to provide depth; ivy, sea fern, and twelve bags of peat were used to dress the set. The floor was painted to appear marshy, aided by the actors' performances, but was flat to allow movement of the Dalek props; the paint had to be removed immediately after production. The prop used by Ian against the Fungoids was a tube with a battery-operated bulb at the end. The rooftop set in the final episode was raised off the studio floor, with a blown-up aerial shot of a jungle laid atop. The crew decided not to destroy the model of the Mechonoid city as it burns in case of a later Mechonoid story; instead, a crossfading effect between shots of the model and stock footage of a volcanic eruption was used. Following the recording of the last episode, Martin wrote to Cusick and Wood to thank them for their work on the serial, crediting them for significantly contributing to any praise that the story would receive.

=== Casting and characters ===
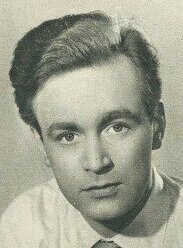
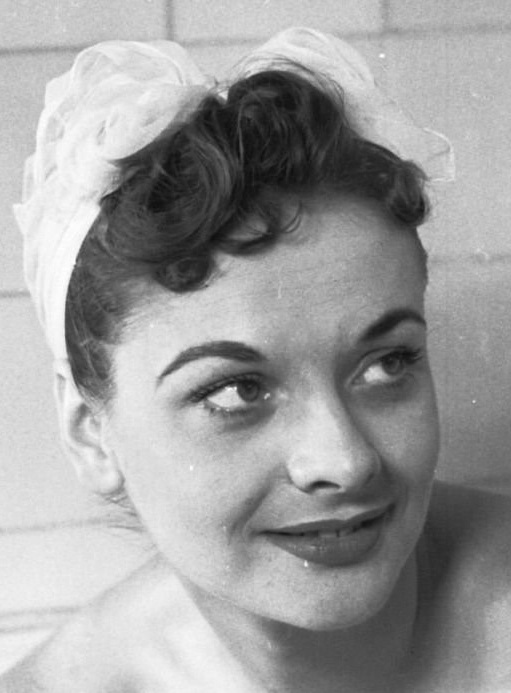
The Chase marked the final appearance of regulars William Russell and Jacqueline Hill (both pictured in 1953) as Ian Chesterton and Barbara Wright.

The Chase marked the final appearance of series regulars William Russell and Jacqueline Hill as Ian Chesterton and Barbara Wright, respectively. Their departure was announced on 1 April 1965; Russell explained the creativity had gone and he wanted to reenter comedy and theatre performances, and Hill said "It has been great fun, but you can't go on forever". They made their decisions independently and gave extended notice to Lambert. Hartnell was greatly upset, becoming the sole original actor remaining on the series, and both he and Lambert tried to persuade them to stay; Hartnell said to Russell, "What's the matter with you? You've got three kids, you've got a job and we're having a great time—what more do you want?". Lambert eventually decided that Ian and Barbara would depart simultaneously in a mildly romantic manner. Hartnell's lines after their departure were left ambiguous in the script, stating in parentheses that he would say "Something about always fussing and bothering and getting in the way"; in the recording, Hartnell said the brief line "Silly old fusspots".

Hartnell was not entirely pleased with Nation's scripts. Throughout production, Martin realised Hartnell struggled to learn his lines, and was largely supported by Russell and Hill. Hartnell consistently wanted to rerecord to perfect his performance. Martin recalled head of drama and Doctor Who co-creator Sydney Newman later praised his and Hartnell's work on the serial. Edmund Warwick, who portrayed the robotic version of the Doctor, said his scenes were a "thank you" written in for him; the previous year, he had replaced Hartnell at short notice after he was injured during recording of The Dalek Invasion of Earth. During rehearsals for the fourth episode, Hartnell demonstrated his mannerisms for Warwick to imitate. Warwick shaved his moustache for the role. He mimed the scenes to dialogue that was pre-recorded by Hartnell on 27 May 1965. Due to the scene's complexity, Warwick portrayed the real Doctor with his back to the camera in some shots.

For the Mechonoids, Martin hired actors who had previously portrayed Daleks and Zarbi; Robert Jewell and Kevin Manser had recently completed work on Dr. Who and the Daleks (1965). David Graham pre-recorded most of his Dalek voices: for the sixth episode on 20 April at Maida Vale Studios, for the first two episodes on 21 April at Lime Grove Studios alongside Peter Hawkins, and for the third and fourth episodes on 12 and 19 May at Lime Grove. Martin cast several actors he had previously worked with in theatre. Arne Gordon, who played the tour guide in the third episode, required special dispensation from the Ministry of Labour and National Service to appear in the show. Roslyn de Winter was cast as the Grey Lady; she was previously hired to play Vrestin and choreograph the Menoptra in The Web Planet.

Martin retrospectively found the costumes of the Aridians—played by Ian Thompson and Hywel Bennett—to be "awful" due to the constrained budget; their movement was ballet-like due to the creatures' piscine nature, but Martin felt they could have taken it further to appear more extraterrestrial. The characters of Frankenstein's monster and Dracula were closely modelled on their appearances in the 1931 films Frankenstein and Dracula, respectively; the script referred to Frankenstein's monster being dressed in "the traditional Karloff costume", referring to Boris Karloff who portrayed the monster in the film. Playing Dracula, Malcolm Rogers pre-recorded his speech and mimed on set; Rogers intentionally moved in a stiff manner to emphasise that the character was a robotic exhibit. In the script, the Fungoids were described as "a black, glistening creature of sponge ... shaped like an egg"; Lambert asked Nation to change the shape so a human actor could fit inside. The name "Fungoid" was originally used for the Mire Beast. Peter Diamond choreographed the fight between the Doctor and his robotic counterpart in the fifth episode.

Peter Purves, who Martin had rejected to cast as a Menoptra in The Web Planet, was cast in the role of Morton Dill. In the draft script, Morton was described as a "rather gawky young man... cast in the Hollywood mould of the southern hayseed come to the big city". After Purves's performance as Morton, Martin, Hartnell, and O'Brien told Lambert they had enjoyed working with him and recommended he be considered to play the next companion. Martin was hesitant to cast Purves in two roles within the same serial, but Lambert approved. Spooner and Lambert took Purves to a pub and offered him the role of Michael Taylor. The following week, Purves discussed the character with Spooner; they changed his name to Steven Taylor and decided he would be quirky and argumentative. Purves accepted the role within days. Though generally unfamiliar with science fiction, he recalled being impressed by the show's first serial, An Unearthly Child (1963), and had enjoyed working with Hartnell and O'Brien; he had met Hartnell a few weeks prior while shooting The World of Wooster (1965–1967) at Ealing Studios. On 21 May 1965, Purves was contracted for three stories (13 episodes), with an option for a further 20 episodes by 10 September and another 26 by 4 February 1966. Purves grew a beard for his role as Steven in the final episode of The Chase. Nation left the character's final actions ambiguous in the script, allowing Spooner to decide how to onboard him as a companion. His role as a companion on the show was announced on 18 June 1965.

=== Filming ===
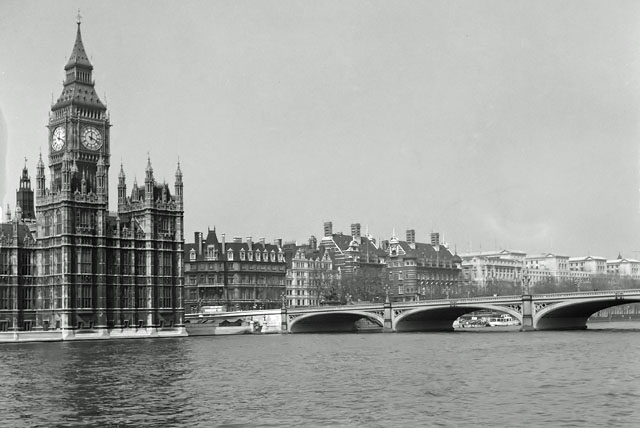
Parliament and Westminster Bridge

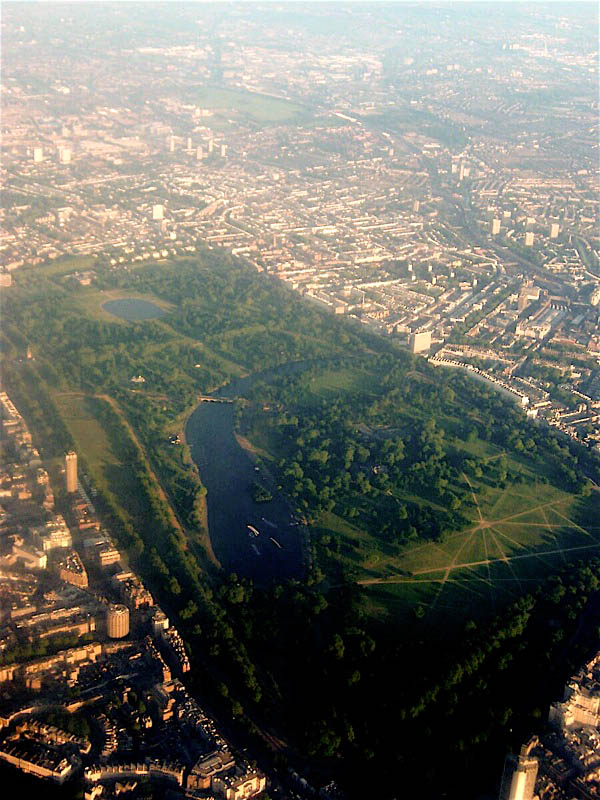
Hyde Park

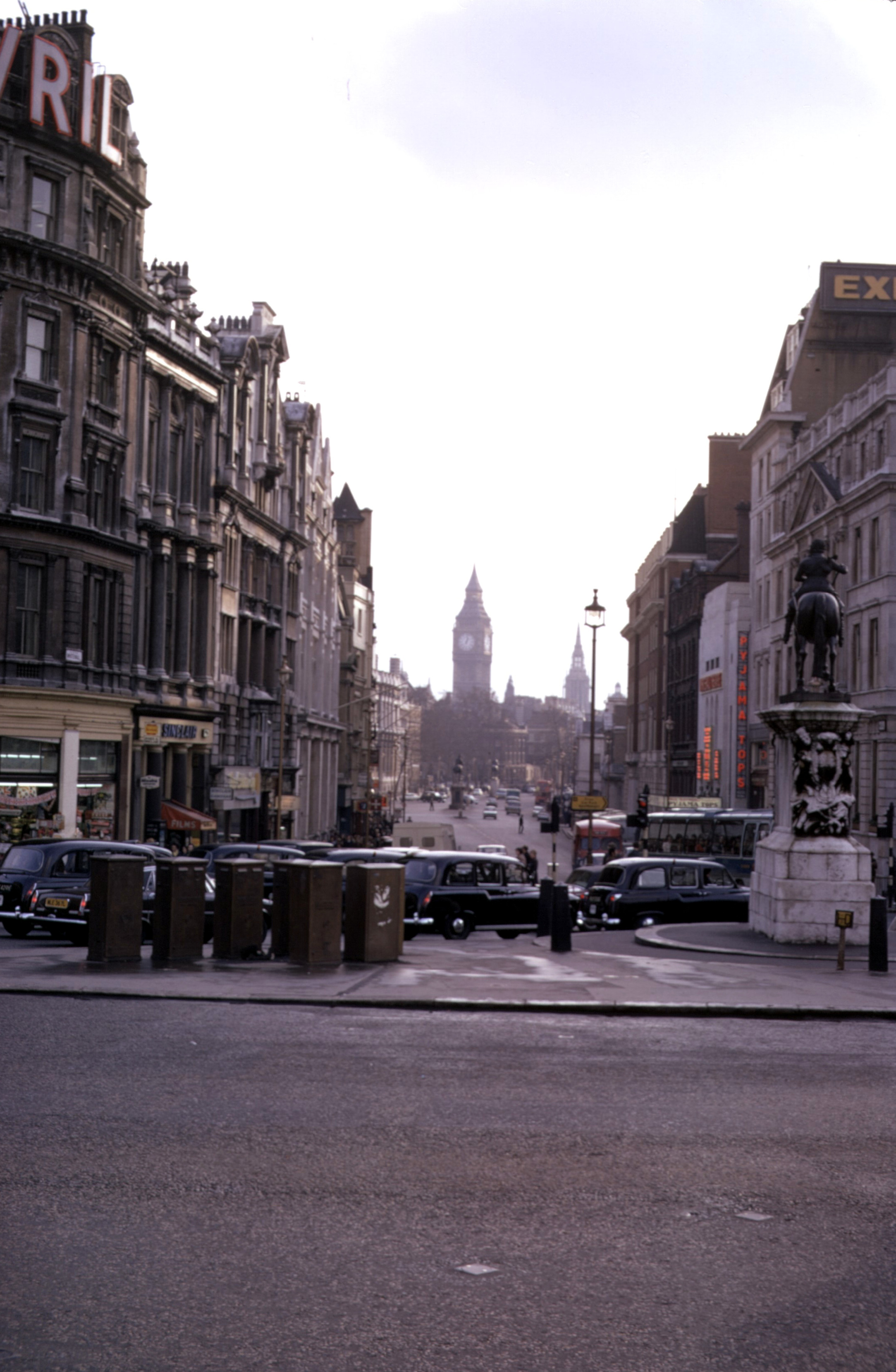
Trafalgar Square

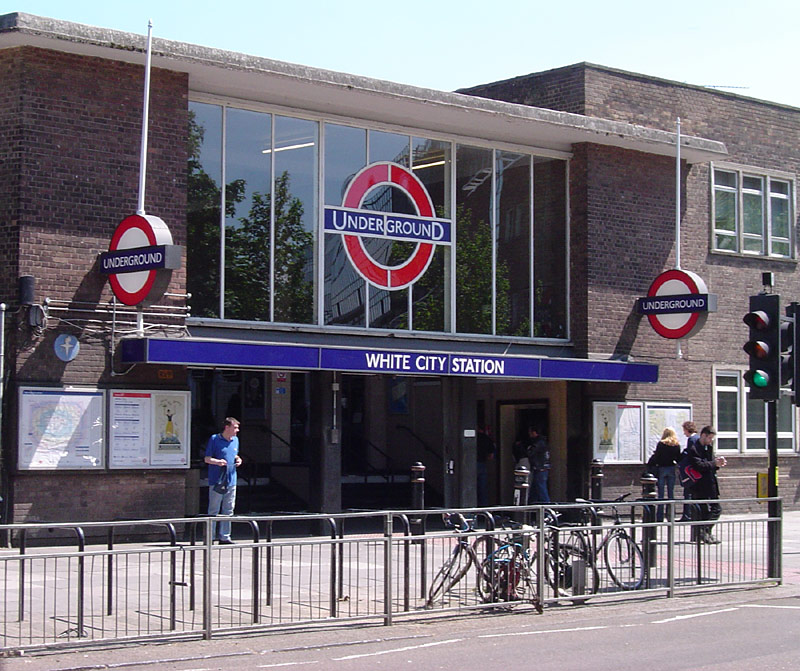
White City tube station

The still photograph shoot featured at the end of the final episode took place at several locations around London. It was directed by Douglas Camfield as part of the pre-filming work for the following serial, The Time Meddler.

While Martin was on leave in early March 1965, Lambert notified the design department that the serial would not utilise location filming; upon his return, however, Martin decided minimal location shooting was desirable for a better representation of the Aridius surface in the first two episodes. Early 35mm film shooting took place in the second week of April 1965. On 9 April, Martin and a film unit travelled to Camber Sands; to avoid interrupting rehearsals for The Space Museum, David Newman and Barbara Joss stood in for Russell and O'Brien, respectively, with the main actors overdubbing their dialogue later. The East Sussex County Council granted permission for the BBC to pay local resident Laurence Nesbitt to dig two holes at the beach with timber shoring: one for the buried Dalek, and the other for Ian's trap for a Dalek.

Four days of pre-filming took place on Stage 3A/B of Ealing Studios, starting with two sequences for the first episode on 12 April: the first featured actor Robert Marsden as Abraham Lincoln, and the second included Roger Hammond, Vivienne Bennett, and Hugh Walters as Francis Bacon, Queen Elizabeth I, and William Shakespeare, respectively. The third episode's Mary Celeste evacuation sequence was recorded on 13 April, the programme's first use of a large water tank, with several stunt actors falling into the water. The battle between the Daleks and Mechonoids and shots of the latter's city were filmed from 14–15 April.

Rehearsals for the first episode began on 26 April 1965. Weekly recording began on 30 April in Studio 1 at Riverside Studios. Delays with effects props provided by Shawcraft Models led to the first episode's recording session overrunning by ten minutes. On 6 May, Russell and Hill were released in the afternoon of rehearsals for the second episode to pose for about 20 photographs used to illustrate their return home in the final episode; the shoot was directed by Douglas Camfield and designed by Barry Newbery as part of the pre-filming work for The Time Meddler. Locations for the photographs included the Houses of Parliament, Hyde Park, Trafalgar Square, Westminster Bridge, and White City tube station.

The recording session of the second episode on 7 May overran due to the lack of a fast rewind machine for retakes and issues with cutting the 35mm film sequences. Russell and Hill were again released in the afternoon of the first day of rehearsals for the third episode, 10 May, to film a short insert at Ealing Film Studios outside the maintenance garage for Ian and Barbara's arrival home; the explosion of the Dalek time ship was achieved by a bright flash of light. Their short scene of on a London bus (with back projection of London streets) was also filmed, on Stage 3A/B at Ealing Film Studios, reportedly directed by Camfield. The recording session of the third episode on 14 May also overran due to issues with the film inserts.

Hartnell's grandson Paul Carney visited the set during recording of the fourth episode on 21 May. Production overran again as some wet paint on scenery had prevented a full rehearsal. For the recording of the fifth episode on 28 May, Lambert suggested the 90-second action sequence—the fight between the Doctor and its robotic counterpart—be recorded first to ensure that Hartnell could regain composure for the remainder of production. The fight scene required precise timing for Hartnell to play both parts; two cameras focused on Hartnell (one on either side) and a third focused on his companions. Martin recalled that Hartnell was dedicated and competent during the fight sequence, having had much experience in similar sequences in his earlier career. The fifth episode recording session overran by 27 minutes. The final episode was recorded on 4 June. Recording for the six episodes cost a total of £18,610. (Note: The six episodes cost £6,083, £2,441, £2,614, £2,658, £2,529 and £2,285, respectively.)

== Reception ==
=== Broadcast and ratings ===
Episode	Title	Run time	Original release date	UK viewers (millions)	Appreciation Index
1	"The Executioners"	25:25	22 May 1965	10.0	57
2	"The Death of Time"	23:32	29 May 1965	9.5	56
3	"Flight Through Eternity"	25:23	5 June 1965	9.0	55
4	"Journey into Terror"	23:49	12 June 1965	9.5	54
5	"The Death of Doctor Who"	23:27	19 June 1965	9.0	56
6	"The Planet of Decision"	26:29	26 June 1965	9.5	57

The serial was broadcast on BBC1 in six weekly parts from 22 May to 26 June 1965. Viewership numbers were considered extremely positive, though the early summer months meant that it failed to gain the high audience figures for serials like The Dalek Invasion of Earth and The Web Planet. It gained generally a million viewers over the preceding serial, The Space Museum, with the first episode receiving ten million viewers, and made its way into the top 20 most-viewed programmes for the night; the fourth and sixth episodes entered the top 10. The serial's Appreciation Index scores were also successful, ranging from 54 to 57, though not as high as The Dalek Invasion of Earth.

The original tapes of the second, fourth, and sixth episodes were erased on 17 August 1967, followed by the third and fifth on 31 January 1969, and the first on 17 July 1969. In 1978, 16mm telerecordings created for overseas markets were discovered at BBC Enterprises. In 1985, the serial was sold through Lionheart as part of a syndicated package to North America, where it was also available as a television movie. In November 1986, the serial was considered for a repeat broadcast as part of TV 50, a celebration of 50 years of the BBC, though it was never played. It was screened on 4 December 1988 at the National Film Theatre as part of a celebration of Doctor Who; Edmund Warwick attended and signed autographs. An additional copy of the first episode was recovered from a deceased collector in 2026.

=== Critical response ===
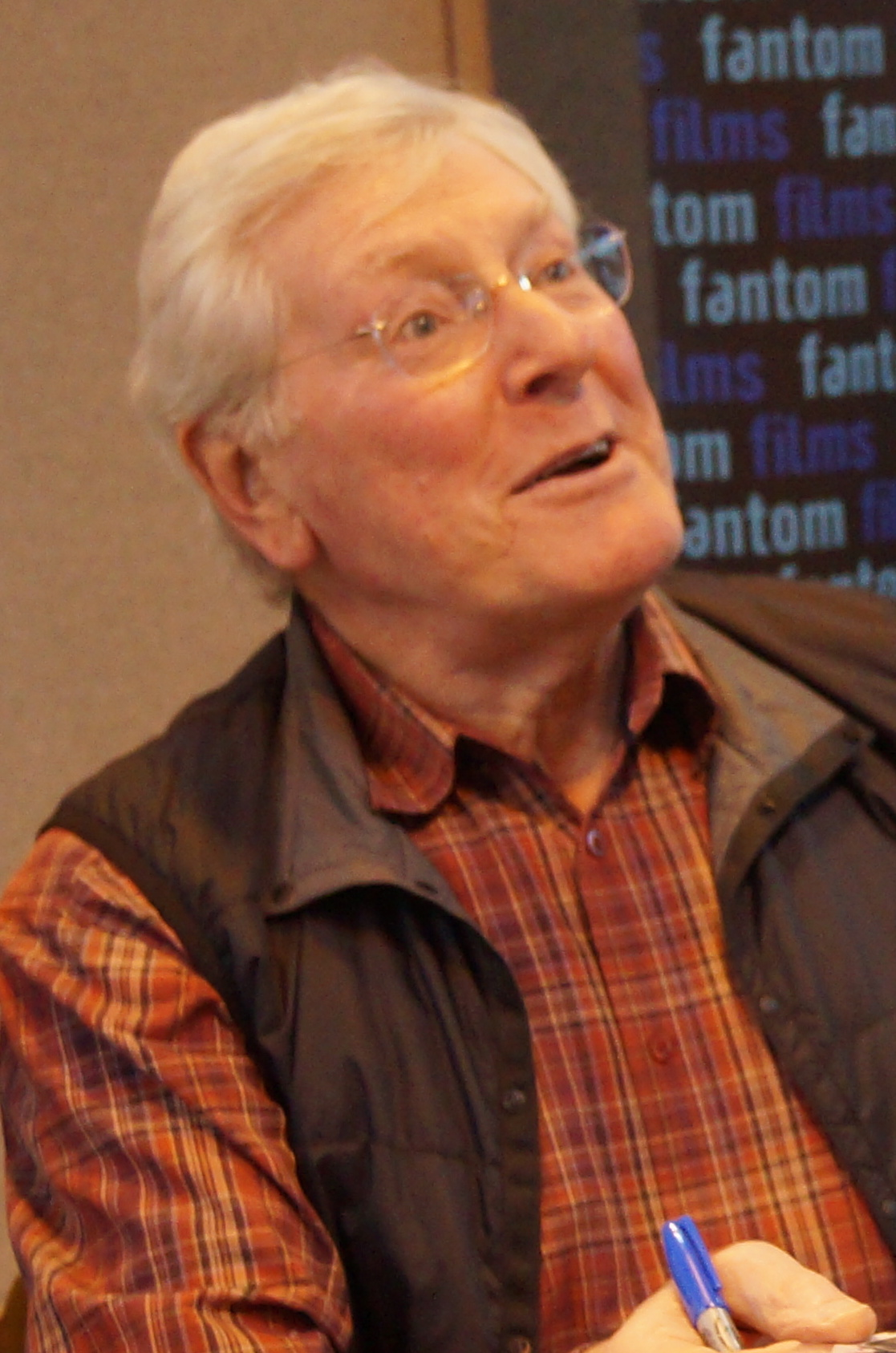
The introduction of Peter Purves (pictured in 2014) as incoming companion Steven Taylor was met with positive responses.

At the BBC Programme Review Board after the first episode's broadcast, controller of television programmes Huw Wheldon noted dissatisfaction at the Daleks' brief appearance; Newman assured they would appear in the following five episodes. Two weeks later, Wheldon restated his appreciation of the serial. After the fourth episode, Philip Purser of the Sunday Telegraph described the show as "a ramshackle old serial these days" and noted the Daleks were "fast losing their ancient menace", criticising their accents. Director of television Kenneth Adam felt the inclusion of Dracula and Frankenstein's monster was an "embarrass de richesses [sic]". An audience report prepared on the fourth episode determined the show was "very entertaining" and "refreshingly different from the usual run" of stories, praising the combination of science-fiction and horror and the performances of the regular cast; conversely, some viewers criticised its messy narrative, its frightening scenes for younger audience, and the haunted house sequences, with some feeling the show was losing its appeal despite the Daleks.

After the final episode, The Observer's Maurice Richardson praised Hartnell's performance—"no wonder it was so difficult to tell which was the real Who and which the anti-Who robot"—and noted the television show overrode his interest in watching the film Dr. Who and the Daleks. Sydney Newman lauded the serial as "one of the best ever" and praised Ian and Barbara's exit. Marjorie Norris of Television Today described the final episode as "far and away the most dramatically successful" in the show's history, praising the battle between the Daleks and Mechonoids, the music and design, and the performances of Hartnell and Purves; of the former, she noted he "deserves much praise for the way he points the comedy of the role without losing the authority and wayward brilliance of the man of science". An audience report prepared for the final episode described it as "an exciting episode to end a varied and ingenious story", with viewers saddened by the departure of Ian and Barbara.

Retrospective reviews of the serial were mixed. In The Discontinuity Guide (1995), Paul Cornell, Martin Day, and Keith Topping described the serial as "one of the most bizarre Doctor Who stories" consisting of "unconnected set pieces with only the barest remnant of a plot". Writing in The Television Companion (1998), David J. Howe and Stephen James Walker found the serial weaker than previous Dalek stories, criticising the comedic and unbelievable nature of the locations; however, they lauded the final episode, praising the battle between the Daleks and the Mechonoids, the design of the latter, the departure of Ian and Barbara, and Purves's performance. In A Critical History of Doctor Who (1999), John Kenneth Muir similarly considered the serial weaker than its predecessors, with some "droll" and "pointless dead ends", though praised the final battle and farewell sequence. In 2009, Patrick Mulkern of Radio Times described the serial as "unashamedly childish and comic-strip in tone and pace"; he praised the Daleks and the first, second, and sixth episodes, but found the fourth episode particularly disappointing. In 2010, Den of Geek's Cliff Chapman similarly considered the final episode the strongest, describing Hartnell's performance as "powerful", but otherwise noted that each viewer's appreciation of the episode "will depend on how you view budget squeezed, shambolicly [sic] directed, Terry Nation scripted romps".

In 2010, Nick Setchfield of SFX acknowledged the "tacky entertainment" of the serial but expressed disappointment when comparing it to "masterly" previous serials like An Unearthly Child; he found it an improvement over The Space Museum "only because it's powered by a demented, ramshackle energy that never allows for boredom". Writing for Doctor Who Magazine, Graham Kibble-White believed the comedy undermined the Daleks, and wrote the serial "suffers from structural oddities", as well as the unconvincing android Doctor; however, Kibble-White praised the Mechonoids and the main cast, feeling Ian and Barbara's departure "positively negates the preceding six episodes of tom-guffery". John Sinnott of DVD Talk found the story's unusual structure worked to its benefit. Total Sci-Fi Online's Jonathan Wilkins likened the serial to pop art and felt "only an utter grouch could dislike a Doctor Who story as zany and iconic as The Chase"; he highlighted the character work concerning Ian and Barbara and the "sense of epic science fiction that is only slightly betrayed by the ever-present problems of budget". In 2012, SFX's Steve O'Brien named the haunted house sequence and the android Doctor among the "silliest moments" in the show's history, though Will Salmon considered Ian and Barbara's departure as among the best of any companion; Den of Geek's Andrew Blair echoed the latter sentiment in 2021.

== Commercial releases ==
The Chase
- A book cover featuring the Doctor Who logo, the Doctor, a Dalek, a Dalek mutant, a Mechanoid, the Mary Celeste and the Mechanoid city
- Author: John Peel
- Cover artist: Alister Pearson
- Series: Doctor Who book: Target novelisations
- Release number: 140
- Publisher: Target Books
- Publication date: 1989
- ISBN: 0-426-20336-4

The Mechonoids were given a press launch on 14 April 1965, and their merchandising rights were offered to manufacturers; several reached out the following day. Herts Plastic Moulders produced a push-along figure to match its Dalek model, and Cherilea Toys sold a two-inch plastic toy for one shilling, though both sold poorly and the latter's moulds were soon modified for a different range. Tower Press printed dry transfers of Mechonoids; manufacturer S. Guiterman & Co. went into liquidation shortly thereafter. The merchandising efforts were considered failures; Doctor Who Magazine's Marcus Hearn felt it led the BBC to realise the difficulty in repeating the Daleks' success. Other companies produced models, such as Fine Art Casings in 1986 and Media Collectables in 2001. Mechonoids also appeared in Souvenir Press's annual The Dalek World (1965), a strip in several issues of TV Century 21 from 1965 to 1966, and subsequently in spinoff media such as Big Finish Productions and Daleks!.

The final episode of The Chase was released as a seven-inch EP by Century 21 Records in April 1966, titled The Daleks; it features new incidental music, additional narration by David Graham, and a recording of the theme music by Eric Winstone. Music and sound effects from the serial were released as part of 30 Years at the Radiophonic Workshop, released by BBC 3D in July 1993. Sound effects were also included on Doctor Who at the BBC Radiophonic Workshop Volume 1: The Early Years 1963–1969, released by BBC Music in May 2000, and sound effects and music were featured on Doctor Who: The 50th Anniversary Collection, released by Silva Screen Records in December 2013 and reissued in November 2014.

A novelisation of this serial, written by John Peel, was published by Target Books and W. H. Allen & Co. in 1989 after lengthy negotiations. Peel restored most of Nation's original ideas in the novelisation, as many of the original changes had been due to timing and budgetary reasons rather than artistic ones. The cover was designed by Alister Pearson. The original print of the book was limited to 24,000 copies. Target reissued the novel with a slightly revised cover in July 1991. An unabridged audiobook of the novelisation, titled Daleks: The Chase, was released in August 2011 by AudioGO; it is narrated by O'Brien, with Dalek voices by Nicholas Briggs, and uses Pearson's cover art. The audiobook was reissued in Doctor Who: Dalek Menace! by AudioGO in October 2012.

The Chase was released on VHS by BBC Video in September 1993 in a box set titled Doctor Who: The Daleks Limited Edition Box Set alongside Remembrance of the Daleks (1988). The set was packaged in a Dalek tin with a booklet written by Andrew Pixley; Andrew Skilleter designed the cover artwork for The Chase. The serial was released in a DVD box set alongside the preceding serial, The Space Museum, in March 2010; it features an audio commentary with Russell, O'Brien, Martin, and Purves, as well as documentaries about the production, the characters of Ian and Barbara, the appeal of the Daleks and their merchandising, a history of Shawcraft Models, and Cusick's visit to the art department of Doctor Who after the fourth revived series. The serial was released on Blu-ray on 5 December 2022, alongside the rest of the show's second season as part of The Collection, and was added to BBC iPlayer on 1 November 2023 alongside most other serials.

A third Dalek film based on The Chase—a sequel to Daleks' Invasion Earth 2150 A.D. (1966)—was considered, but never made.

== Bibliography ==
- Ainsworth, John, ed. (2016). "The Crusade, The Space Museum, The Chase and The Time Meddler". Doctor Who: The Complete History. Vol. 5. London: Panini Comics, Hachette Partworks. ISSN 2057-6048.
- Barnes, Alan (9 January 2008). "The Fact of Fiction: The Chase". Doctor Who Magazine. No. 390. Royal Tunbridge Wells, Kent: Panini Comics. pp. 46–53.
- Bignell, Jonathan; O'Day, Andrew (2004). Terry Nation. Manchester: Manchester University Press. ISBN 978-0-719-06547-7.
- Brunt, David (10 May 2024). "The Making of Doctor Who". The Doctor Who Production Diary: The Hartnell Years. Telos Publishing. ISBN 978-1-845-83222-3.
- Cornell, Paul; Day, Martin; Topping, Keith (1995). The Discontinuity Guide. London: Virgin Books. ISBN 0-426-20442-5.
- Hearn, Marcus (24 February 2021). "Game Plan". Doctor Who Chronicles. pp. 76–79.
- Hill, Christopher (24 February 2021). "Toy Stories". Doctor Who Chronicles. pp. 44–51.
- Howe, David J.; Walker, Stephen James (1998). Doctor Who: The Television Companion: Volume 1 (2021 ed.). London: BBC Books. ISBN 978-1-845-83156-1.
- Howe, David J.; Walker, Stephen James; Stammers, Mark (1994). The Handbook: The Unofficial and Unauthorised Guide to the Production of 'Doctor Who'. Vol. 1 (2016 ed.). London: Telos Publishing. ISBN 978-1-845-83941-3.
- Kibble-White, Graham (1 April 2010). "DVD Review: The Space Museum/The Chase". Doctor Who Magazine. No. 420. Royal Tunbridge Wells, Kent: Panini Comics.
- Kilburn, Matthew (24 February 2021). "Pages of History". Doctor Who Chronicles. pp. 80–83.
- Muir, John Kenneth (1999). A Critical History of Doctor Who on Television. Jefferson, North Carolina: McFarland & Company. ISBN 978-0-786-40442-1.
- Peel, John (January 1989). "Production Notes: The Chase". Doctor Who Magazine. No. 144. pp. 10–12.
- Richardson, Maurice (27 June 1965). "Consultants anonymous". The Observer. p. 20. Archived from the original on 7 December 2021 – via Newspapers.com.
- Winn, John C. (2008). Way Beyond Compare: The Beatles' Recorded Legacy, Volume One, 1962–1965. New York, NY: Three Rivers Press. ISBN 978-0-307-45239-9.
