= The Web Planet =

1965 Doctor Who serial

013 – The Web Planet
- Doctor Who serial
- Barbara with the Menoptra and a Zarbi. The alien costumes and blurred camera lens received criticism from audiences.

Cast
- Doctor: William Hartnell – First Doctor
- Companions: William Russell – Ian Chesterton; Jacqueline Hill – Barbara Wright; Maureen O'Brien – Vicki
- Others: Catherine Fleming – Animus voice; Roslyn de Winter – Vrestin; Arne Gordon – Hrostar; Arthur Blake – Hrhoonda; Jolyon Booth – Prapillus; Jocelyn Birdsall – Hlynia; Martin Jarvis – Hilio; Ian Thompson – Hetra; Barbara Joss – Nemini; Robert Jewell, Jack Pitt, Gerald Taylor, Hugh Lund, Kevin Manser, John Scott Martin – The Zarbi

Production
- Directed by: Richard Martin
- Written by: Bill Strutton
- Script editor: Dennis Spooner
- Produced by: Verity Lambert
- Music by: Jacques Lasry and François Baschet (Note: Stock music originally arranged for Les Structures Sonores)
- Production code: N
- Series: Season 2
- Running time: 6 episodes, 25 minutes each
- First broadcast: 13 February 1965
- Last broadcast: 20 March 1965

Chronology
← Preceded by The Romans	Followed by → The Crusade

The Web Planet is the fifth serial of the second season of the British science fiction television series Doctor Who. Written by Bill Strutton and directed by Richard Martin, the serial was broadcast on BBC1 in six weekly parts from 13 February to 20 March 1965. In the serial, the First Doctor (William Hartnell) and his travelling companions Ian Chesterton (William Russell), Barbara Wright (Jacqueline Hill), and Vicki (Maureen O'Brien) ally themselves with the Menoptra, the former inhabitants of the planet Vortis, as they struggle to win back the planet from the malignant Animus (Catherine Fleming) and its Zarbi slaves.

When crafting an idea for the serial, Strutton recalled a memory as a child of watching two bull ants fighting, which he linked with his two sons fighting each other. Story editor Dennis Spooner found the narrative to be multilayered, with the Menoptra representing free enterprise and the Zarbi communism. Martin hired a mime artist to develop choreography for the serial, and forwent a traditional score in favour of prerecorded stock music. The Web Planet premiered with 13.5 million viewers, the highest in the series to date; it maintained high viewership across the six weeks. Reviews were mixed, with praise directed at its choreography and action, and criticism towards its costumes and confusing story; retrospective reviews applauded the serial's ambition despite its outdated visuals. The Web Planet was later novelised and released on VHS and DVD.

== Plot ==
The TARDIS is forced to land on a planet which the First Doctor (William Hartnell) recognises as Vortis, but he is puzzled by the presence of several moons around the normally moonless planet. A force acting through Barbara Wright's (Jacqueline Hill) gold bracelet draws her outside, leaving Vicki (Maureen O'Brien) alone. The TARDIS is pulled by an unseen force across the planet surface. Barbara is drawn into a trio of the moth-like Menoptra who free her of the trance by removing the bracelet. She escapes but is captured by the ant-like Zarbi who use her to find the Menoptra. The Zarbi take Barbara and Hrostar (Arne Gordon), a Menoptra, to the Crater of Needles to drop vegetation into acid rivers which feed the Animus (voiced by Catherine Fleming).

The Zarbi take the Doctor and Ian Chesterton (William Russell) to the Carsinome where they find Vicki and the TARDIS. The Animus forces the Doctor to help track down the Menoptra invasion force. Ian escapes and meets a Menoptra called Vrestin (Roslyn de Winter). He learns the Menoptra and the Zarbi are native to the planet. The Animus has taken control of the planet, and the Menoptra have fled to one of the moons that the Animus has pulled into orbit. The Doctor accidentally reveals the Menoptra spearhead plan to land near the Crater of Needles, giving the Animus the opportunity to ambush them. Ian and Vrestin meet the Optera, descendants of the Menoptra who fled underground, and convince them to help fight the Animus, digging upwards beneath the Carsinome.

At the Crater of Needles, Barbara and Hrostar fail in their attempt to warn the Menoptra and the spearhead is massacred. The Doctor deduces that the Animus uses gold to channel its mesmerising force and counteracts it to control a Zarbi and escape with Vicki. They meet Barbara and the Menoptra and devise a plan to attack the Carsinome. The Doctor and Vicki are taken by the Zarbi to the Animus, a great spider-like creature. Barbara and the Menoptra attack the Carsinome from outside while Ian, Vrestin, and the Optera reach the Animus from below. They defeat the Animus with the Isoptope, a cell-destroying weapon devised by the Menoptra. The Zarbi return to their docile state, and the planet turns to its purer state. The Doctor and his companions leave in the TARDIS, and the creatures of Vortis promise to tell stories of their saviours.

== Production ==
=== Conception and writing ===
In 1964, Australian writer Bill Strutton viewed Doctor Who and decided that he wanted to write for it, although he had no knowledge of science fiction. After his agents at Associated London Scripts contacted the production team, Strutton was invited to discuss his story idea with producer Verity Lambert and story editor David Whitaker. They asked him to avoid robotic monsters due to the success of the Daleks. Strutton recalled a memory as a toddler, watching two bull ants fighting inside an empty kerosene can; he linked this memory with his two sons, aged six and four, fighting each other. He discussed the idea with Lambert, and Whitaker officially commissioned the story, Doctor Who and the Webbed Planet, on 28 September 1964.

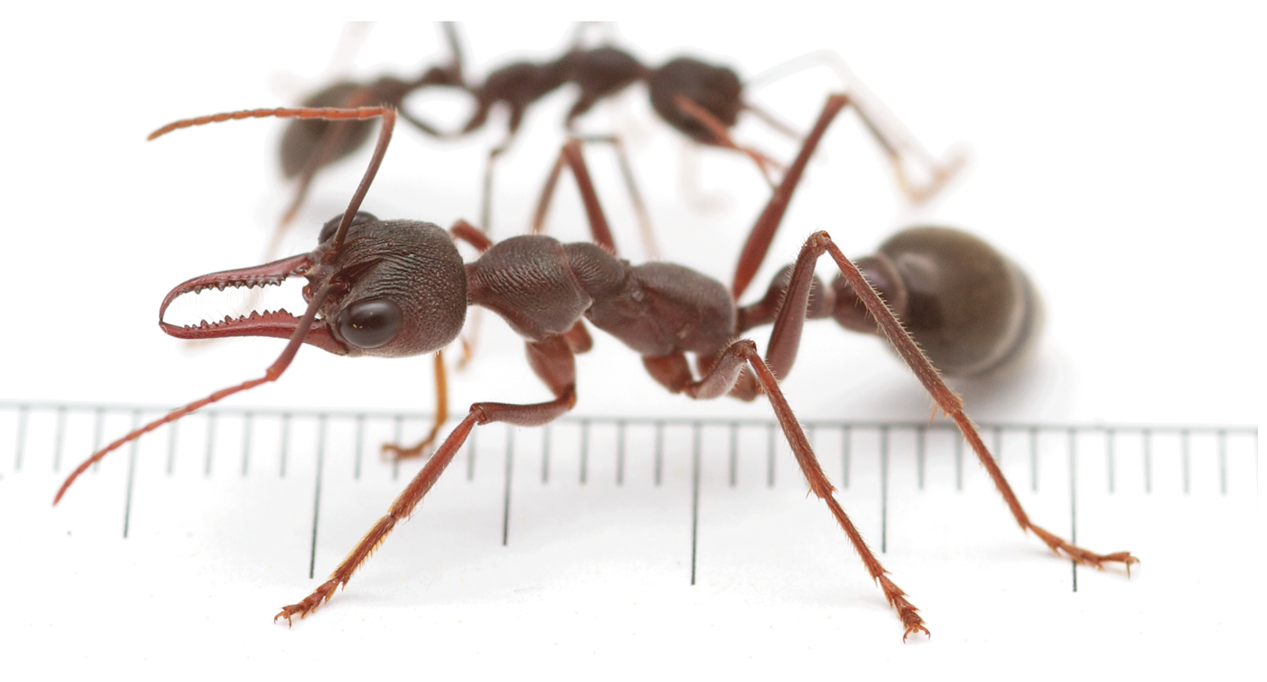
While creating the Zarbi, writer Bill Strutton recalled a memory of watching two bull ants fighting as a child.

Richard Martin was assigned to direct the serial. Although disappointed with the scripts, Martin observed that they were as close to a fantasy adventure as Doctor Who should get; he felt that they had visual potential, but that the available studio facilities would limit it. He disliked the dialogue and found the scripts too short, working with new story editor Dennis Spooner on amendments. Martin overspent the serial's budget to achieve the desired visuals, which led to conflict with the cost-conscious Lambert. To account for the high cost of the props and costumes, Martin forwent a traditional, original score, instead using recordings of musique concrète performances arranged by Jacques Lasry and François Baschet for Les Structures Sonores; Martin found the sounds extraterrestrial, as they were created using glass rods and steel. Lambert edited the final episode as Martin had departed for a holiday shortly after its recording; she edited out a shot of the Carsenome web dissolving, explaining in a memo to Martin that "I thought nobody would know what on earth was happening".

The scripts were due on 13 November; Strutton wrote them while in the process of relocating homes. Strutton's wife Marguerite created the name of the Zarbi. Other names originated from an encyclopedia: the Greek word Lepidoptera inspired Menoptera (later Menoptra) and Optera; and Carcinoma inspired Carsinome (later Carsenome). Spooner made edits to the script towards the end of 1964; he found the narrative to be multilayered, with the Menoptra representing free enterprise and the Zarbi communism. Spooner also made edits to tie the serial into the preceding one, The Romans; the golden bracelet used to make Barbara fall under the influence of the Animus was a gift from Emperor Nero in The Romans. Two of the Menoptra were renamed: Roster became Hrostar, and Papillus became Prapillus.

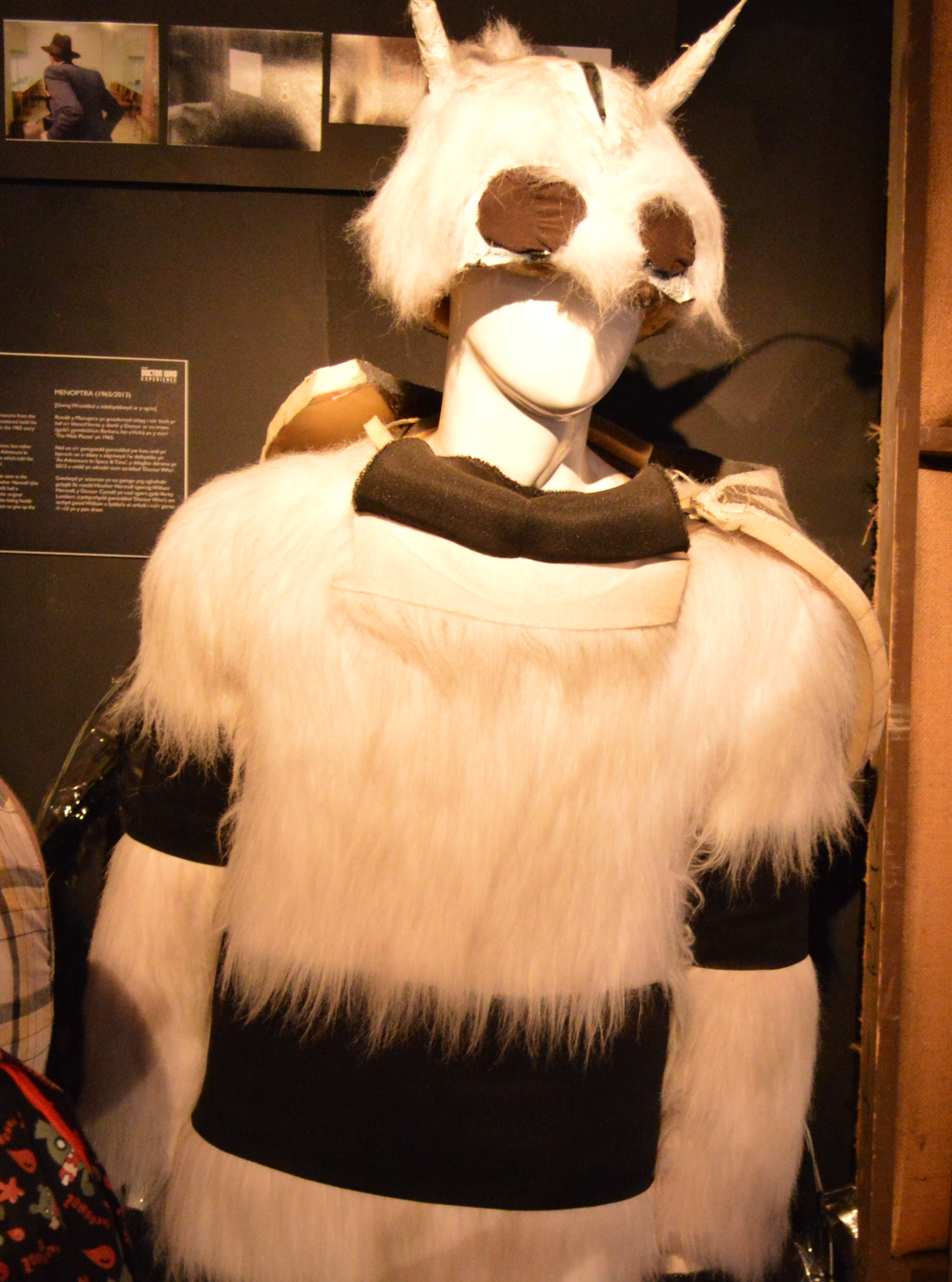
A Menoptra costume on display at the Doctor Who Experience

The show's main designers, Raymond Cusick and Barry Newbery, asked for a third designer to be allocated to the production block, leading to the appointment of set and effects designer John Wood; Wood welcomed working on the show as it allowed more freedom than other programmes. He used Strutton's descriptions to create sketches for the eight-foot Zarbi; he wanted them to be believable while disguising the human element. They were also based on suits of armour for balancing. Lambert was enthusiastic about the design, though other members of the team were hesitant regarding its practicality. Four costumes were constructed by Shawcraft Models; light Styrofoam was originally suggested for construction, but fibreglass was used instead. The outfits were modelled on Robert Jewell, and they took around 30 minutes to don. For a shot of the Temple of Light, Wood was inspired by the Aztec temples of Central America.

=== Casting and characters ===
The script for the third episode was structured to omit Barbara, as Jacqueline Hill was scheduled to take a week's holiday; she retained a credit in Radio Times, but not on-screen, as was common when the regular cast was absent. Hill formally complained on 1 March 1965 and requested that her credit be reinstated for overseas sales, but this was not acted upon. Lambert felt that Barbara's occupation as a schoolteacher meant that she should often work to save the day, as in The Web Planet. All guest characters in the serial are non-humanoid. Casting interviews for The Web Planet took place on 8 December 1964. Martin wanted special choreography for the insects, hiring Australian mime artist Roslyn de Winter to develop the delivery of the Optra and the hand gestures of the Menoptra; de Winter was also cast as Vrestin. For the Menoptra, the production team sought actors with dancing experience; one actor who auditioned was Peter Purves, but Martin felt that his talent would be wasted in the role and kept him in mind for later. (Note: Martin eventually cast Purves as Morton Dill—and later as companion Steven Taylor—in The Chase (1965).) Catherine Fleming, who voiced the Animus, stood on set with a microphone and a script to read her lines.

The three established Dalek operators—Jewell, Kevin Manser, and Gerald Taylor—were cast as the main Zarbi, alongside John Scott Martin in his first appearance on the series. Ian Thompson and Barbara Joss were cast as the Optera; Thompson had worked with Martin in the past, and Joss was an experienced dancer from Australia. Thompson and Martin collaborated to create the creatures' dialogue and behaviour. Arne Gordon, who ran an antique stall in Portobello Road, was cast by Martin as she had large eyes suitable for an insect. Martin also cast Martin Jarvis as Hilio, having met him during his performance of Poor Bitos in the West End alongside Martin's girlfriend Suzanne Neve. Jolyon Booth, cast as Prapillus, was an old friend of Martin's, while Jocelyn Birdsall, cast as Hlynia, had worked with Martin on stage in 1952. Maureen O'Brien enjoyed working with Martin—The Web Planet was their first collaboration—due to his intelligence and their shared political outlook.

=== Filming ===
Model filming for the serial began on 4 January 1965 at BBC Television Film Studios on Stage 2 and lasted for several days. It included several model shots, including the TARDIS being moved across Vortis and the establishing model shot of the TARDIS's materialisation; the one-third scale prop created for The Romans was used. Martin wanted to use a greased neutral-density filter on shots of Vortis to capture its thin atmosphere, but found that the optical glass was too expensive, opting for a cheaper alternative; two special lenses were fitted, both of which broke at some point during production. Some of the bird's-eye view shots were achieved by using mirrors. Several of the shots featuring Barbara were filmed in advance from 6–7 January to accommodate for Hill to take a holiday; she missed rehearsals of The Romans to film these. Rehearsals for the first episode began on 18 January at the London Transport Assembly Rooms in Wood Green, and weekly recording for the serial began on 22 January.

The second episode's recording session, on 29 January, overran by a costly 16 minutes due to several production problems leading to seven retakes; among the problems were broken costumes, actors walking through shots, scenery problems causing actors to forget their lines, and a cast member speaking unprompted. The third episode, recorded on 5 February, was beset by similar problems, including a delay in the delivery of some sets, camera failures, and a delay with the studio lighting; the recording overran by 37 minutes. The recording had finished so late that the dressing room lights were switched off by studio management, forcing the crew to exit in darkness. Following the recording, Lambert asked Martin to avoid allowing the actors to alter their dialogue, noting that major changes should be suggested at readthroughs with Spooner present.

Fifteen bags of seaweed from Cornish Manures were requested as set dressing for the fourth episode; during recording on 12 February, the seaweed emanated an overpowering vegetable smell under the hot studio lights. William Russell was absent from rehearsals for the fifth episode on 16 February to film for the subsequent serial, The Crusade. Hartnell's granddaughter Judith Carney (later Jessica Carney) visited the studio during the fifth episode's recording on 19 February. The final episode was recorded on 26 February, and the session overran by 15 minutes due partly to sound problems necessitating a major retake. For the final episode, the crew treated the set more carelessly to achieve the damaged look they were seeking, as they knew it would not be used again. Throughout filming of the serial, at the insistence of Lambert, Martin avoided showing much detail for the more brutal visuals, such as deaths; Lambert retrospectively cited criticism that the crew received for a violent scene in The Edge of Destruction (1964) as her reasoning.

== Reception ==
=== Broadcast and ratings ===
Episode	Title	Run time	Original release date	UK viewers (millions)	Appreciation Index
1	"The Web Planet"	23:57	13 February 1965	13.5	56
2	"The Zarbi"	23:20	20 February 1965	12.5	53
3	"Escape to Danger"	22:52	27 February 1965	12.5	53
4	"Crater of Needles"	25:50	6 March 1965	13.0	49
5	"Invasion"	26:04	13 March 1965	12.0	48
6	"The Centre"	24:28	20 March 1965	11.5	42

A special trailer for The Web Planet, filmed on 4 February 1965, features the Zarbi arriving at the BBC Television Centre before being shown to their dressing rooms. The trailer, screened on BBC1 on 6 February 1965, upset Martin, who felt that it undersold his work and made him feel "like a conjurer about to do an elaborate two and a half hour trick when all the audience know the secrets already"; Lambert responded that the comedic trailer was intentional to take "the curse out of the Zarbi" for younger viewers. The serial was broadcast on BBC1 in six weekly parts from 13 February to 20 March 1965. Viewership increased from the preceding serial, reaching a series-high of 13.5 million viewers for the first episode. The ratings dropped for the following episodes, with the final two hitting 12 million, but they were still considered successful, ranking among the top 20 programmes for each week; the first episode ranked joint 18th in the national charts, with an estimated viewership of 5.45 million households. The Appreciation Index began well but fell rapidly, dropping below 50 for the first time; the final episode set a new record low of 42.

The serial was believed to have been wiped in the early 1970s and presumed missing until negative film prints of all six episodes were recovered from BBC Enterprises in the late 1970s. Unedited prints were also discovered in Nigeria in 1984. The fourth episode was shown on 29 October 1983 at the National Film Theatre as part of the 20th anniversary event Doctor Who: The Developing Art; it was also screened at regional events like the Bradford Playhouse and Film Theatre on 8 June 1984. British Satellite Broadcasting screened the serial between July and September 1990, and it was broadcast in episodic form on UK Gold in December 1992 alongside a compilation version. An additional film print of the first episode was recovered by the organisation Film is Fabulous! from a deceased collector in 2026.

=== Critical response ===
The first episode was criticised by Peter Black of the Daily Mail, who described the main characters as "the dullest quartet in fiction". Comments from younger viewers read on Junior Points of View were mixed; some found the episode "exciting and hair-raising", while others complained about the "pointless, noisy, bleeping" of the Zarbi. Following the broadcast of the second episode, Patrick Skene Catling of Punch wrote that the serial was guilty of "ludicrous bathos". After the third episode, Bill Edmund of The Stage and Television Today described the lighting effects as "pointless and annoying". Following the fifth episode, the Sunday Mirror received a complaint from A. N. Thompson that the show was "slipping" due to its newly-comedic nature. At the BBC Programme Review Board in March 1965, Alasdair Milne said that the series was "difficult to follow, unless one watched every edition"; at the following Review Board, controller of programmes Huw Wheldon said that the serial was going well, while BBC1 controller Michael Peacock felt that the series had too much "mumbo-jumbo" and that the character names were difficult to follow. In April, The Scotsman's Peggie Phillips considered the serial to be a flop. An audience report prepared following the serial's broadcast indicated satisfaction with its conclusion and choreography, but confusion regarding the action and criticism of the costumes and blurred lens.

Retrospective reviews were mixed. In The Discontinuity Guide (1995), writers Paul Cornell, Martin Day, and Keith Topping praised the serial's imagination and ambition, but noted that it was "slow and silly looking" by modern standards. In The Television Companion (1998), David J. Howe and Stephen James Walker said that the story's ambition "may be seen as its great strength or its great weakness, depending on the spirit in which it is approached". In A Critical History of Doctor Who (1999), John Kenneth Muir described the serial as "a noble experiment" despite its mixed execution; he praised the costumes for the Zarbi, but criticised the Menoptra suits, alien voices, blurred lens, and Strutton's unoriginal scripts. In 2008, Mark Braxton of Radio Times acknowledged the costume design efforts and "superbly atmospheric" sets, though felt that they had not aged well; he felt that the story had an "almost total absence of excitement", but enjoyed its ambition and deeper meaning about good versus evil. In 2009, Den of Geek's Cliff Chapman ranked The Web Planet among the most underrated classic Doctor Who serials, noting that it "is a joy for being so different" even if "the ambition might outstrip the execution". In 2012, Neela Debnath of The Independent found the story "enjoyable" with ambitious writing that "lacks impact given the poor quality of the visuals". In 2015, Twelfth Doctor actor Peter Capaldi said that "the ambition and imagination was great but they just didn't have the resources to deliver".

== Commercial releases ==
The Zarbi received several pieces of merchandise as toy manufacturers hoped that they would become as popular as the Daleks; they featured in several comic strips and in related merchandising in 1965. The serial was originally released on VHS as a double-tape set in September 1990. It was released on DVD by BBC DVD in October 2005, with special features including a making-of documentary, a copy of the Doctor Who Annual 1965, and an audio commentary by Russell, Martin, Lambert, Jarvis, and Gary Russell. BBC Audio released an audiobook of the serial in November 2005, read by William Russell. The serial was released as a vinyl record by Demon Records on 13 December 2019, with linking narration by Maureen O'Brien. The serial was released on Blu-ray on 5 December 2022, alongside the rest of the second season as part of The Collection, and was added to BBC iPlayer on 1 November 2023 alongside most other serials.

=== In print ===
Doctor Who and the Zarbi
- Cover of the Target Books reprint
- Author: Bill Strutton
- Cover artist: John Woods (original); Chris Achilleos (reprint)
- Series: Doctor Who novelisations
- Release number: 73
- Publisher: Frederick Muller Ltd (original); Target Books (reprint)
- Publication date: September 1965 (original); May 1973 (reprint)
- ISBN: 0-426-10129-4

Strutton was approached by Frederick Muller Ltd to create a novelisation of the serial, which he wrote in three weeks; Doctor Who and the Zarbi was published as a hardback in September 1965, with illustrations by John Wood. It was republished in December 1975 by White Lion, retaining Wood's original artwork except for the cover painting, which instead depicted the Fourth Doctor (Tom Baker). A paperback edition was published by Target Books in May 1973, with illustrations by Chris Achilleos; Achilleos was disappointed by the BBC's insistence that the cover artwork resemble the television counterpart. The Target paperback was reissued several times: with a revised logo in August 1978, with Alister Pearson's artwork in January 1990, and by BBC Books in April 2016 with Achilleos's cover and Wood's illustrations.

A facsimile edition of the original 1965 hardback was released by BBC Books in November 2016. The book was translated and published in other countries: Doctor Who en de Zarbis, translated into Dutch by M. Hohage, was published by Unieboek BV Bussum in 1974; and Doutor Who e os Zarbi, translated to Portuguese by Eduardo Nogueira and Conceicao Jardim with cover art by Rui Ligeiro, was published by Presenca in 1986.

== Bibliography ==
- Ainsworth, John, ed. (2016). "The Crusade, The Space Museum, The Chase and The Time Meddler". Doctor Who: The Complete History. 5 (11). London: Panini Comics, Hachette Partworks. ISSN 2057-6048.
- Bentham, Jeremy (1986). Doctor Who: The Early Years. London: W. H. Allen. ISBN 0-491-03612-4.
- Cornell, Paul; Day, Martin; Topping, Keith (1995). The Discontinuity Guide. London: Virgin Books. ISBN 0-426-20442-5.
- Howe, David J.; Stammers, Mark; Walker, Stephen James (1994). Doctor Who The Handbook – The First Doctor. London: Doctor Who Books. ISBN 0-426-20430-1.
- Howe, David J.; Walker, Stephen James (1998). Doctor Who: The Television Companion: Volume 1 (2021 ed.). London: BBC Books. ISBN 978-1-845-83156-1.
- Molesworth, Richard (2010). Wiped! Doctor Who's Missing Episodes. Telos Publishing. ISBN 978-1-84583-037-3.
- Muir, John Kenneth (1999). A Critical History of Doctor Who on Television. Jefferson, North Carolina: McFarland & Company. ISBN 978-0-786-40442-1.
- Wright, Mark, ed. (2017). "The Dalek Invasion of Earth, The Rescue, The Romans and The Web Planet". Doctor Who: The Complete History. 4 (61). London: Panini Comics, Hachette Partworks. ISSN 2057-6048.
