= The Dalek Invasion of Earth =

1964 Doctor Who serial

010 – The Dalek Invasion of Earth
- Doctor Who serial
- A Dalek rises from the Thames in a scene considered one of the show's best cliffhangers.

Cast
- Doctor: William Hartnell – First Doctor
- Companions: William Russell – Ian Chesterton; Jacqueline Hill – Barbara Wright; Carole Ann Ford – Susan Foreman
- Others: Bernard Kay – Carl Tyler; Peter Fraser – David Campbell; Alan Judd – Dortmun; Ann Davies – Jenny; Michael Goldie – Craddock; Michael Davis – Thomson; Richard McNeff – Baker; Graham Rigby – Larry Madison; Nicholas Smith – Wells; Patrick O'Connell – Ashton; Jean Conroy, Meriel Hobson – The Women in the Wood; Peter Hawkins, David Graham – Dalek voices; Peter Badger, Martyn Huntley – Robomen; Nick Evans, Robert Jewell, Kevin Manser, Peter Murphy, Gerald Taylor – Daleks; Nick Evans – Slyther Operator

Production
- Directed by: Richard Martin
- Written by: Terry Nation
- Script editor: David Whitaker
- Produced by: Verity Lambert
- Music by: Francis Chagrin
- Production code: K
- Series: Season 2
- Running time: 6 episodes, 25 minutes each
- First broadcast: 21 November 1964
- Last broadcast: 26 December 1964

Chronology
← Preceded by Planet of Giants	Followed by → The Rescue

The Dalek Invasion of Earth is the second serial of the second season of the British science fiction television series Doctor Who. Written by Terry Nation and directed by Richard Martin, the serial was broadcast on BBC1 in six weekly parts from 21 November to 26 December 1964. In the serial, the First Doctor (William Hartnell), his granddaughter Susan Foreman (Carole Ann Ford), and teachers Ian Chesterton (William Russell) and Barbara Wright (Jacqueline Hill) discover that the Earth in the 22nd century has been occupied by Daleks. They work with a human resistance group to stop the Daleks from mining out the Earth's core as part of their plan to pilot the planet through space.

The serial was commissioned following the success of the Daleks from the titular serial of the first season. The serial also marks the final regular appearance of Ford as Susan, having been dissatisfied with the character's development. The writers had considered introducing Susan's replacement within The Dalek Invasion of Earth, but delays in contract renewals forced it to the following serial. The serial was the first major location shoot for Doctor Who, with production taking place at Trafalgar Square, Westminster Bridge, and the Royal Albert Hall. The serial premiered with 11.4 million viewers, maintaining strong viewers across the six weeks. Contemporary reactions were positive, with many praising the return of the Daleks. Retrospective reviews were also positive, with particular praise directed at the first episode's cliffhanger and Susan's emotional departure, though the direction and pacing has been criticised. The serial later received several print adaptations and home media releases.

== Plot ==
After the TARDIS materialises, the First Doctor (William Hartnell), Susan Foreman (Carole Ann Ford), Ian Chesterton (William Russell), and Barbara Wright (Jacqueline Hill) surmise that they have landed in London, but find it in ruins. The Doctor and Ian stumble across an army of Robomen as a Dalek rises from the River Thames. The Daleks take the Doctor and Ian onboard their saucer. Resistance members explain that the Daleks invaded Earth in the aftermath of a meteorite bombardment ten years prior.

Barbara and Susan are taken by refugees to a nearby shelter in an abandoned Underground station, where they meet resistance members who are planning an assault on the Daleks. The resistance leader, paraplegic scientist Dortmun (Alan Judd), has created a bomb to destroy the Daleks' outer casings. Susan, Barbara, and the resistance team attack the Daleks using the bombs, but they are ineffective. David (Peter Fraser) rescues the Doctor with Susan while Barbara gets separated. Ian hides as the saucer leaves for the Dalek mining operations. There, he escapes the Slyther (Nick Evans), a pet of the Black Dalek. He eventually hides in the mine and becomes trapped in a capsule filled with explosives. The Doctor, Susan, and David arrive at the cliffs overlooking the mine; the Doctor sends David and Susan to interfere with the Daleks' radio signals, while he climbs into the mine.

Dortmun sacrifices himself so that Barbara and Jenny (Ann Davies) can escape. They repair an old truck and head for the mining operations, but are reported to the Daleks when seeking shelter and sent to work. They are later brought before the Black Dalek and discover that the Daleks are drilling through the Earth's crust to blow out its core, the intention being to replace the core with a device to pilot the planet like a spacecraft. The Daleks imprison Barbara and Jenny and set the explosive-filled capsule in position, but Ian jams the capsule half-way down the shaft. The Doctor frees Barbara and Jenny. With the radio signals damaged, Barbara and the Doctor order the Robomen to destroy the Daleks, and the human slaves rebel. The bomb destroys the Dalek fleet and causes a volcanic eruption in England.

Back in London, David begs Susan to stay and marry him. Susan agonises, declaring her love but admitting that she must leave. The Doctor locks the TARDIS doors and bids Susan an emotional farewell, telling her that she deserves a normal life with David. He promises to return one day, and sets the TARDIS in motion. Susan drops her TARDIS key and leaves with David.

== Production ==
=== Conception and writing ===
In March 1964, story editor David Whitaker formally commissioned Terry Nation to write a serial for Doctor Who's second season following the success of the first-season serial The Daleks (1963–1964), as well as Nation's quick and effective work on The Keys of Marinus (1964). The commission was made under the title Doctor Who and the Daleks. Nation delivered the storyline for the serial in mid-April 1964 under the name The Return of the Daleks. The serial was retitled The Dalek Invasion of Earth by September; The Daleks in Europe appeared on some design material.

The Dalek props were refurbished for the serial, adding new eyestalks, a dish receptor, improved bases for movement, and a new pedal mechanism. (Note: Dalek designer Raymond Cusick had proposed the addition of a pedal mechanism for the original design the previous year.) The serial's score was composed by Francis Chagrin. Around 18 minutes of incidental music for the first three episodes was recorded on 10 September 1964 at Maida Vale Studios, and 12 minutes for the final three episodes was recorded by five musicians on 8 October. Chagrin had conceived the music from the serial's final scene some time before production and was "dying to use it".

=== Casting and characters ===
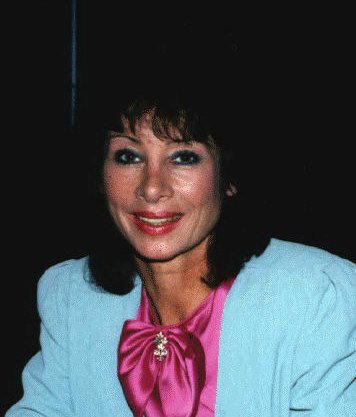
The Dalek Invasion of Earth is the final regular appearance of Carole Ann Ford as Susan Foreman.

On 12 March 1964, trade paper Television Today announced that Carole Ann Ford would depart from her role as Susan at the end of her contract, due to her dissatisfaction with the character's development. Whitaker wanted a strong reason for Susan's departure. To assist the story's development, Ford and Hartnell were invited to stay with Nation and his wife over a weekend in August. In June 1964, head of serials Donald Wilson considered continuing the show without the character of Barbara, and with a younger actress for Susan. Delays by Controller of Programmes Donald Baverstock to renew cast contracts meant that Susan's replacement, then intended to be Jenny (originally known as Saida), could not be introduced in the serial. Director Richard Martin asked Ann Davies, who was cast as Jenny, if she would be available as a regular cast member, but he could not offer the role.

The Dalek Invasion of Earth was the first speaking role of Nicholas Smith, who portrayed Wells. When Smith discovered he was only starring in one episode, he approached Martin; Martin asked him to return in a later episode to lead the human rebellion. Jean Conroy, who played one of the women in the woods in the fifth episode, died in a street accident on 14 November; the episode was broadcast posthumously.

=== Filming ===
The Dalek Invasion of Earth was the first major location shoot for Doctor Who. Filming in 35mm began at Trafalgar Square at around 5:30 a.m. on 23 August 1964, consisting of shots of a deserted city. The design team added Dalek markings on landmarks such as Nelson's Column, which police requested they remove. On the same day, filming took place at the statue of the Duke of Cambridge in Whitehall, Westminster Bridge, and the Royal Albert Hall. Martin had an agreement with police to vacate parts of central London for filming. Production resumed two days later on 25 August at the closed Wood Lane tube station. On 27 August, filming took place at Hammersmith Bridge. The location was chosen as it provided easy access to a hospital in case any performers swallowed river water; a taxi remained on standby. Dalek operator Robert Jewell could not gain enough traction to move his Dalek out of the river; the prop was attached to a cable to help. Doctor Who's first filming in a quarry took place on 28 August at Stone, Kent. Peter Hawkins and David Graham recorded Dalek voiceovers on 16 September.

Rehearsals for the first episode began on 14 September in White City, and weekly studio recording began on 18 September in Studio 1 at Riverside Studios. Though smaller overall than Lime Grove Studios, the complex used for previous serials, Riverside offered well-equipped and larger individual studios. During camera rehearsals for the third episode on 2 October, Hartnell injured his back when a prop ramp malfunctioned; when Martin apologised for the incident, Hartnell assured that he would be fine, but producer Verity Lambert insisted that he take several days to rest. Following discussions between Hartnell's solicitors and the BBC's, the BBC denied liability and paid for an X-ray. Hartnell was given a week off to recover, and the fourth episode underwent minor rewrites; Edmund Warwick doubled for Hartnell as The Doctor in the episode. The final episode was recorded on 23 October, marking a year of production since the filming of the show's first serial; recording was delayed by half an hour due to some technical facilities being used by coverage of the 1964 Summer Olympics. The production crew anticipated the final episode to be one of the most technically complex. The recording suffered some camera and sound issues, causing Hartnell to stumble some speeches. Hartnell omitted two lines from the Doctor's closing speech to Susan. (Note: The two lines omitted by Hartnell include one earlier in the speech: "Work hard both of you. Be gentle with her David and show her that life on Earth with love and understanding can be a great adventure." The second line was meant to end the speech: "And remember love is the most precious jewel of all.") Ford recorded footage of the cast between camera rehearsals on her personal 8 mm film camera.

== Reception ==
=== Broadcast and ratings ===
Episode	Title	Run time	Original release date	UK viewers (millions)	Appreciation Index
1	"World's End"	23:42	21 November 1964	11.4	63
2	"The Daleks"	24:19	28 November 1964	12.4	59
3	"Day of Reckoning"	26:50	5 December 1964	11.9	59
4	"The End of Tomorrow"	23:23	12 December 1964	11.9	59
5	"The Waking Ally"	24:29	19 December 1964	11.4	58
6	"Flashpoint"	25:21	26 December 1964	12.4	60

The Dalek Invasion of Earth was successful among viewers, with an additional four million viewers over the previous serial: the first episode received 11.4 million viewers, which rose to 12.4 the following week. The third and fourth episodes received 11.9 million, which dropped to 11.4 for the fifth episode, and rose again to 12.4 for the final. The first episode was the highest-rated BBC programme for northern England, and the third episode was the highest-rated for Wales and western England. The fifth episode was ranked 18th in the national ratings for the week, tied with ITV's Thank Your Lucky Stars. The Appreciation Index was highest for the first episode at 63, dropping to 59 for the second, third, and fourth episodes, and to 58 for the fifth, before rising to 60 for the final. The serial was shown at the Longleat 20th Anniversary Celebration on 3 April 1983, and the first episode was screened at the National Film Theatre on 29 October 1983. All six episodes were screened at the theatre on 5 January 1999.

=== Critical response ===
The serial's final scene—in which the Doctor bids farewell to Susan, the show's first companion departure—was praised for its emotional impact and William Hartnell's performance.

At the BBC Programme Review Board after the broadcast of the first episode in November 1964, director of television Kenneth Adam called it "interesting". The Audience Research Report was higher than usual, with praise for the production and atmosphere; the primary complaint was the lack of Daleks, and some viewers felt it was too gruesome for children. The Review Board described the third episode as "outstanding". The following week, executives of the Board felt that the show's quality was consistently high. Adam indicated that Director-General Hugh Greene was eager to see the Daleks return in future stories. T. C. Worsley of the Financial Times praised the serial for creating a universal image for the Daleks. On 27 May 1965, critic Frederick Laws wrote that he had banned his children from watching Doctor Who due to the ending of the serial's first episode.

Retrospective reviews of the serial were generally positive. In The Discontinuity Guide (1995), Paul Cornell, Martin Day, and Keith Topping praised the exterior sequences of the Daleks, though noted the less impressive production of the Slyther. In The Television Companion (1998), David J. Howe and Stephen James Walker described the serial as "one of the series' all-time greats", with impressive scripting and location filming despite some clumsy direction; they also praised the "poignant and moving" final scene. In A Critical History of Doctor Who (1999), John Kenneth Muir found the serial to be one of Doctor Who's darkest, and praised the location shooting and the characterisation of Susan, though noted some sexism in the Doctor's final remarks and criticised some "positively amateurish" special effects.

In 2008, Mark Braxton of Radio Times praised the supporting cast, location filming, and emotional ending, but noted the continuity errors concerning the Daleks and the production shortcomings as a result of the serial's ambition. In a 2011 review, The A.V. Club's Christopher Bahn criticised the serial's slow pacing and the uninteresting concept of the Robomen, and noted that Susan's departure lacked dramatic impact because the Doctor chose for her; however, he praised the first episode and its cliffhanger, and the characterisation of the Doctor. In 2010, Charlie Jane Anders of io9 listed the first episode's cliffhanger as one of the greatest in the show's history. The Dalek Invasion of Earth was voted the best First Doctor story by Doctor Who Magazine readers in 2020; writer Nick Setchfield cited the atmosphere, character, and narrative as its greatest elements, and the first episode's cliffhanger and Susan's departure among its best moments.

== Commercial releases ==
Doctor Who and the Dalek Invasion of Earth
- Author: Terrance Dicks
- Cover artist: Chris Achilleos
- Series: Doctor Who book: Target novelisations
- Release number: 17
- Publisher: Target Books
- Publication date: 24 March 1977
- ISBN: 0-491-02124-0

Terrance Dicks used the camera scripts to adapt a novelisation of the serial, Doctor Who and the Dalek Invasion of Earth, published in March 1977 by Target Books as a paperback and Allan Wingate in hardback. The cover, designed by Chris Achilleos, was based on the film adaptation. The paperback was reissued with a blue variant of the Doctor Who logo in 1980. The novelisation was included in Doctor Who: Dalek Omnibus, published in hardback by W. H. Allen. It was also published as one of the first Doctor Who Classics by Star Books in August 1988. Target reissued the novel in 1990 with Alister Pearson's artwork from the video release. The book was also published internationally: in Germany as Doctor Who: Kampf um die Erde and Doctor Who und das Komplott der Daleks, and in France as Doctor Who: Les Daleks Envahissent la Terre. An audio version of the novelisation was published by BBC Audiobooks in November 2009, read by William Russell with Dalek voices by Nicholas Briggs. It was included in AudioGO's Doctor Who – Invasion Earth! collection in October 2012.

The serial was released as a double-tape pack by BBC Video in May 1990. The British Board of Film Classification gave the serial a PG rating, rather than the lighter U like other serials, due to scenes such as drownings, floating corpses, a machine gun killing, and the effect of the Daleks' exterminators. It was released on DVD in June 2003, with special features including audio commentary, documentaries, and Ford's footage from the final day of recording. A collectors' edition box set, limited to 5,000 copies, was released at WHSmith in October 2005. The serial was included in The Dalek Collection box set, released by BBC Worldwide on Amazon in January 2007. It was also released in issue 95 of Doctor Who DVD Files in August 2012. The serial was released on Blu-ray on 5 December 2022, alongside the rest of the second season as part of The Collection, and was added to BBC iPlayer on 1 November 2023 alongside most other serials.

== Film adaptation ==
In 1966, the serial was adapted as a film, Daleks' Invasion Earth 2150 A.D., directed by Gordon Flemyng and written by Milton Subotsky and David Whitaker. The film stars Peter Cushing as Dr. Who and Roberta Tovey as Susan, with the roles of Ian Chesterton and Barbara Wright being replaced by the new characters Tom Campbell (Bernard Cribbins) and Louise (Jill Curzon).

== Bibliography ==
- Ainsworth, John, ed. (2015). "100,000 BC and The Mutants (aka The Daleks)". Doctor Who: The Complete History. 1 (4). London: Panini Comics, Hachette Partworks. ISSN 2057-6048.
- Cornell, Paul; Day, Martin; Topping, Keith (1995). The Discontinuity Guide. London: Virgin Books. ISBN 0-426-20442-5.
- Howe, David J.; Walker, Stephen James (1998). Doctor Who: The Television Companion: Volume 1 (2021 ed.). London: BBC Books. ISBN 978-1-845-83156-1.
- Muir, John Kenneth (1999). A Critical History of Doctor Who on Television. Jefferson, North Carolina: McFarland & Company. ISBN 978-0-786-40442-1.
- Setchfield, Nick (July 2020). Barnes, Alan (ed.). "The World Cup of the First Doctor". Doctor Who Magazine (552). Royal Tunbridge Wells, Kent: Panini Comics: 38–49. ISSN 0957-9818.
- Wright, Mark, ed. (2017). "The Dalek Invasion of Earth, The Rescue, The Romans and The Web Planet". Doctor Who: The Complete History. 4 (61). London: Panini Comics, Hachette Partworks. ISSN 2057-6048.
