= The Romans (Doctor Who) =

012 – The Romans
- Doctor Who serial
- Nero (Derek Francis) reprimands the Doctor (William Hartnell) for setting fire to his plans. The performances of Francis and Hartnell in the serial received praise.

Cast
- Doctor: William Hartnell – First Doctor
- Companions: William Russell – Ian Chesterton; Jacqueline Hill – Barbara Wright; Maureen O'Brien – Vicki
- Others: Derek Francis – Nero; Michael Peake – Tavius; Brian Proudfoot – Tigellinus; Kay Patrick – Poppaea Sabina; Peter Diamond – Delos; Derek Sydney – Sevcheria; Nicholas Evans – Didius; Barry Jackson – Ascaris; Ann Tirard – Locusta; Dennis Edwards – Centurion; Margot Thomas – Stall Holder; Edward Kelsey – Slave Buyer; Bart Allison – Maximus Pettulian; Dorothy-Rose Gribble – Woman Slave; Gertan Klauber – Galley Master; Ernest Jennings, John Caesar – Men in Market; Tony Lambden – Court Messenger

Production
- Directed by: Christopher Barry
- Written by: Dennis Spooner (Note: Dennis Spooner was also the show's script editor, and was credited as such on the serial's scripts, but only credited on-screen as the writer.)
- Produced by: Verity Lambert
- Music by: Raymond Jones
- Production code: M
- Series: Season 2
- Running time: 4 episodes, 25 minutes each
- First broadcast: 16 January 1965
- Last broadcast: 6 February 1965

Chronology
← Preceded by The Rescue	Followed by → The Web Planet

The Romans is the fourth serial of the second season of the British science fiction television series Doctor Who. Written by Dennis Spooner and directed by Christopher Barry, the serial was broadcast on BBC1 in four weekly parts from 16 January to 6 February 1965. In the serial, the First Doctor (William Hartnell) and his new companion Vicki (Maureen O'Brien) investigate intrigue surrounding the death of a lyre player en route to perform at the palace of Nero (Derek Francis) in Rome, while companions Ian Chesterton (William Russell) and Barbara Wright (Jacqueline Hill) are captured by slave traders and sold respectively as a galley slave (later a gladiator) and as a body slave to Nero's wife Poppaea (Kay Patrick).

The Romans was envisioned as the first Doctor Who serial with a humorous tone, originally intended to parody the 1951 film Quo Vadis. The story presents real historical characters in a fictitious manner. The serial was produced in a six-episode block with the preceding story, The Rescue, to introduce new companion Vicki. It features the design work of Raymond Cusick, and the incidental music was composed by Raymond Jones in his first work for the series. The Romans premiered with 13 million viewers, continuing the high viewership of the previous serial, which it maintained across the four weeks. Reviews were generally positive, with praise for the performances and characterisation, though its comedic tone received mixed responses. The serial was later novelised and released on VHS and DVD.

== Plot ==
A month after the TARDIS fell off a cliff, the First Doctor (William Hartnell), Ian Chesterton (William Russell), Barbara Wright (Jacqueline Hill), and Vicki (Maureen O'Brien) are relaxing in an unoccupied Roman villa. The Doctor and Vicki leave the villa to travel to Rome. Ian and Barbara stay behind, but are soon kidnapped by slave traders and sold into slavery. Barbara is sold to a statesman in the court of Emperor Nero named Tavius (Michael Peake) as handmaiden to Nero's wife Poppaea Sabina (Kay Patrick), whilst Ian is confined to a galley on the Mediterranean.

En route to Rome, the Doctor is mistaken for a murdered lyre player named Maximus Pettulian (Bart Allison), and decides to assume his identity after being attacked by an assassin. The Doctor and Vicki arrive in Rome and encounter Tavius, who implies that both he and Pettulian are a part of a conspiracy. Ian's galley runs into rough seas and is broken up, washing him ashore with another survivor of the galley named Delos (Peter Diamond). The pair head to Rome in search of Barbara, only to be captured and taken to be trained as gladiators.

Nero (Derek Francis) organises a banquet in the Doctor's honour, at which he must play the lyre. Poppaea is angered by Nero's attempts to flirt with Barbara and attempts to poison her, which fails due to Vicki having switched the poisoned goblet. The Doctor makes no noise when playing the lyre, claiming that only those with sensitive hearing can hear the music. Nero is angered, and decides to have the Doctor fed to the lions. At the arena, Ian and Delos fight their way out, attempting to reunite with Barbara. Nero calls off his soldiers, planning to have Ian killed when he returns to rescue Barbara.

The Doctor finds the plans for Nero's new Rome, and realises that, because the year is 64 AD, Nero is planning to destroy the city. Tavius arrives and reveals that Pettulian was meant to be an assassin all along, and warns the Doctor that Nero is planning to kill him. The Doctor accidentally sets fire to Nero's plans, which gives him the idea for the Great Fire of Rome; he spares the Doctor's life. Ian and Barbara are reunited and escape back to the villa as the Doctor and Vicki watch the city burn from a nearby hill. All four leave in the TARDIS before a strange force drags the ship to an unknown location.

== Production ==
=== Conception and writing ===
The concept of a Doctor Who serial set in ancient Rome originated during the planning of the show's second season in early 1964; in April, it was allocated four episodes under the description "Roman". The production team decided that it would use The Romans and its preceding episode, The Rescue, to introduce new companion Vicki following the departure of Carole Ann Ford as Susan Foreman; The Rescue was written by outgoing script editor David Whitaker as a two-part introductory story, and The Romans was written by new script editor Dennis Spooner as a further establishing adventure. Whitaker officially commissioned Doctor Who and the Romans on 31 August 1964; Spooner was due to deliver the first two scripts by September and the last two by October. Richard Martin was originally assigned to direct The Romans, but was replaced by Christopher Barry in October 1964 following the decision to use the same production team as The Rescue, forming a single six-episode production block. Barry soon contacted Antonio Maria Colini of the Museum of Roman Civilisation to discover more information regarding Nero's ruling of Italy.

The Romans was envisioned as the first Doctor Who serial with a humorous tone, which producer Verity Lambert had been interested in attempting; according to William Russell, Lambert recognised Spooner's sense of humour and asked him to incorporate it into the script. The original concept was to parody the 1951 film Quo Vadis, though the team soon discovered that another parody of the film, Carry On Cleo (1964), was also in production. The story presented real historical characters like Nero and events like the Great Fire of Rome in a fictitious manner. Spooner used the surname of Robert Guiscard for the character Flavius Guiscard, the owner of the villa used by the Doctor and his companions. Early revisions of the scripts used Vicki's original names, Tanni and Lukki.

Raymond Cusick worked as the serial's designer; it was his only historical serial, and became his least favourite work. He had a budget of £450 per episode. Several of the set elements were already owned by the BBC, though a few were constructed by Bill Roberts of Shawcraft Models. Barry contracted Peter Diamond in early November 1964 to coordinate the stunt work; Diamond was also cast in the role of Delos as it required fighting expertise. The serial's incidental music was composed by Raymond Jones, who was new to the series but had worked with Barry on Ann Veronica (1964). The score, pre-recorded at Broadcasting House on 25 November 1964, used harp, French horn, flute, and clarinet.

=== Casting and characters ===
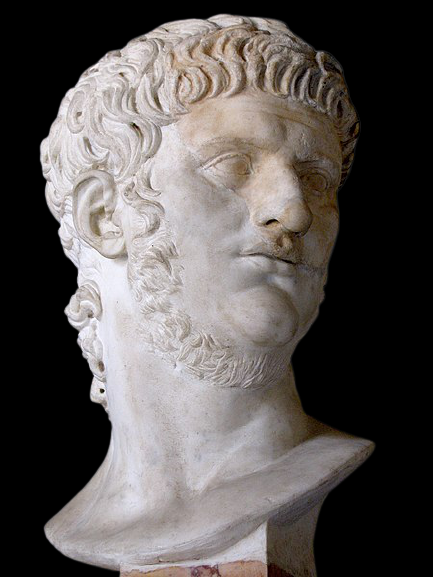
The Romans presents real historical characters like Nero in a fictional manner.

William Hartnell felt at ease with The Romans as it allowed him to perform some comedy; it similarly became a favourite for William Russell. The serial's guest cast was announced in a publicity document issued on 27 November 1964. Derek Francis, who played Nero, was a friend of Jacqueline Hill and her husband Alvin Rakoff; he had been promised a role in Doctor Who since it started. Spooner had envisioned a different actor for Nero; Barry had also considered Paul Whitsun-Jones, George A. Cooper, and Dick Emery. Edward Kelsey, who portrayed the slave buyer, was a long-term friend of Barry's, as the two had entered the television industry at the same time. Two guest actors had previously appeared in the show as extras: Tony Lambden, who portrayed the court messenger, was previously an extra in The Keys of Marinus; and Brian Proudfoot, who played Tigellinus, had previously acted as Hartnell's double for location filming in The Reign of Terror. The guest cast received their scripts on 30 November and 14 December.

=== Filming ===
Model filming for the serial began on 17 November 1964 at BBC Television Film Studios on Stage 2. The crew captured the model shots of the TARDIS using 35mm film. A one-fifth scale model was used for the model falling, and a one-third scale prop was used for the shots of the TARDIS in the overgrown gully; the props were made by Shawcraft Models. Additional filming took place the following day, using extra Albert Ward as a double for Hartnell's hands. Model shots of the burning Rome were also filmed, using a model built by Shawcraft; the construction was rushed, and Cusick was unhappy with the height of the flames. Rehearsals for the first episode began on 14 December 1964 at the London Transport Assembly Rooms in Wood Green; it was filmed on 18 December in Studio 1 at Riverside Studios. Miss M. Vetta, a visitor from Amsterdam, visited the camera rehearsal as part of the show's European publicity drive. The crew was granted a holiday for Christmas the following week, shifting the show's recording to three weeks in advance of transmission.

Rehearsals for the second episode commenced on 28 December; Hartnell injured his left knuckle during a rehearsal on 30 December after striking his hand on a wooden sword wielded by Barry Jackson. The second episode was filmed on 1 January 1965. The episode used several pieces of stock footage, including some provided by Rank Productions at Pinewood Studios; the shot of the lions at the end of the episode was from World Background Films as seen in the Roman documentary The Golden Milestone (1964). Barry was unhappy with Nero's introductory scene; discussions were held on 5 January regarding retaking the scene or filming during the next episode, but neither occurred. Rehearsals for the third episode began on 4 January; Russell sustained a small cut to his left wrist while rehearsing a fight sequence on 6 January, and Hill missed rehearsals on 6–7 January to film sequences for the following serial, The Web Planet. The third episode was filmed on 8 January, Hartnell's 57th birthday, and the final episode was recorded on 15 January. Kay Patrick, who portrayed Poppaea Sabina, was reluctant to slap Michael Peake as Tavius as she did not wish to hurt him; Peake insisted that she should, telling her to imagine that they did not know each other.

== Reception ==
=== Broadcast and ratings ===
Episode	Title	Run time	Original release date	UK viewers (millions)	Appreciation Index
1	"The Slave Traders"	24:14	16 January 1965	13.0	53
2	"All Roads Lead to Rome"	23:14	23 January 1965	11.5	51
3	"Conspiracy"	26:18	30 January 1965	10.0	50
4	"Inferno"	23:09	6 February 1965	12.0	50

The Romans was broadcast on BBC1 in four weekly parts from 16 January to 6 February 1965. The serial maintained the high viewership of The Rescue; with 13 million viewers, the first episode was the most-watched of the show to date (tied with the second episode of The Rescue). The second episode dropped to 11.5 million viewers, and was ranked 20th by TAM with an estimated viewership of 5.3 million homes. The third episode received a smaller audience of 10 million viewers, attributed to its broadcast in the wake of the televised funeral of Winston Churchill. The fourth episode reached 12 million viewers. The Appreciation Index dropped from 53 for the first episode to 51 for the second, the lowest in the show's history to date, surpassed by 50 for the third and fourth episodes. UK Gold broadcast the serial in episodic form from November 1992; it was originally scheduled earlier, but was replaced by The Aztecs.

=== Critical response ===
Following the broadcast of the first episode, The Guardian's Mary Crozier wrote that "the action was patchy and the dialogue uneven in quality". A journalist for The Times called Doctor Who "the strongest weapon in the BBC armoury", noting that The Romans "promises well" and describing the production as "once again flawless". At the BBC Programme Review Board, director of television Kenneth Adam praised Jacqueline Hill's performance in the second episode. Letters read out on Junior Points of View following the third episode noted historical inaccuracies in Ian's outfit. An audience report prepared following the serial's broadcast was negative, with criticism directed at the show's historical episodes; several felt that it looked corny and amateurish, though the performances of Hartnell and Francis were praised.

Retrospective reviews were generally positive. In The Discontinuity Guide (1995), Paul Cornell, Martin Day, and Keith Topping wrote that "Hartnell shows the talent that got him the part", and praised the serial's atmosphere and comedy. In The Television Companion (1998), David J. Howe and Stephen James Walker felt that the episode is remembered "for its innovative use of humour", despite some historical inaccuracies. In A Critical History of Doctor Who (1999), John Kenneth Muir wrote that the serial's humour and wit set it apart from other historical stories, noting that it resonates where The Reign of Terror does not; he also praised the character development of Ian and Barbara, and Hartnell's comedic performance. In 2008, Mark Braxton of Radio Times praised Spooner's insertion of "playful" comedy into a story with dark elements, noting that the story was "well-rounded and neatly structured" even if it "may not get it exactly right"; he also praised Hartnell's performance and his interactions with Vicki, as well as the moments between Ian and Barbara.

In 2009, Cliff Chapman of Den of Geek found that the serial "does comedy well" with "witty dialogue, character moments, slapstick, and drama". DVD Talk's Stuart Galbraith IV praised the serial's ambition and uniqueness, and Total Sci-Fi Online's Jonathan Wilkins called it a "genuine treasure" in which Hartnell displayed his comedic side. IGN's Arnold T. Blumberg lauded Francis and Hartnell's performances, noting that the latter is "absolutely at his doddering best". In 2012, Christopher Bahn of The A.V. Club noted that the story was less interested in historical accuracy but succeeded in comedy, praising the characterisation of the Doctor and Nero, the latter of whom he felt was "played to the hilt by Francis" by balancing the character's darker and lighter sides.

== Commercial releases ==
The Romans
- Author: Donald Cotton
- Cover artist: Tony Masero
- Series: Doctor Who book: Target novelisations
- Release number: 120
- Publisher: Target Books
- Publication date: April 1987
- ISBN: 0-426-20288-0

A novelisation of this serial was written by Donald Cotton, adapted from Spooner's scripts. It is an epistolary novel, written in the forms of fictional transcripts of letters and ancient documents collected by Tacitus; the transcripts include the Doctor's diary, Ian's journal, notes from Nero's scrapbook, letters from Ascaris to his mother, and Locusta's autobiography. The novelisation was first published in hardback by WH Allen in April 1987, followed by paperback September 1987; both versions featured a cover painted by Tony Masero. An audiobook of the novelisation was published by Penguin Books and BBC Studios on 5 January 2023, read by several actors including O'Brien.

The Romans was released on VHS as a double-pack with The Rescue by BBC Video in September 1994, with the cover designed by Andrew Skilleter. It was released on DVD in a slipcase with The Rescue by BBC Worldwide in February 2009; the Region 1 release followed on 7 July 2009. The DVD includes audio commentary with William Russell, Nicholas Evans, Christopher Barry, and Toby Hadoke, as well as documentaries about the production, Spooner, and the show's female companions. The serial was released on Blu-ray on 5 December 2022, alongside the rest of the second season as part of The Collection, and was added to BBC iPlayer on 1 November 2023 alongside most other serials.

The off-air soundtrack of The Romans was released by BBC Worldwide in May 2008, with linking narration by Russell; the CD also contained three radio spots, including an interview with Hartnell's granddaughter Jessica Carney. The CD was later re-released in The TV Episodes: Collection 6 box set by AudioGO in September 2013. Metal miniature models of Nero were distributed by Harlequin Miniatures in December 1999.

== Bibliography ==
- Cornell, Paul; Day, Martin; Topping, Keith (1995). The Discontinuity Guide. London: Virgin Books. ISBN 0-426-20442-5.
- Howe, David J.; Walker, Stephen James (1998). Doctor Who: The Television Companion: Volume 1 (2021 ed.). London: BBC Books. ISBN 978-1-845-83156-1.
- Muir, John Kenneth (1999). A Critical History of Doctor Who on Television. Jefferson, North Carolina: McFarland & Company. ISBN 978-0-786-40442-1.
- Wright, Mark, ed. (2017). "The Dalek Invasion of Earth, The Rescue, The Romans and The Web Planet". Doctor Who: The Complete History. 4 (61). London: Panini Comics, Hachette Partworks. ISSN 2057-6048.
