= Robert Marsden =

British actor

Marsden, Robert
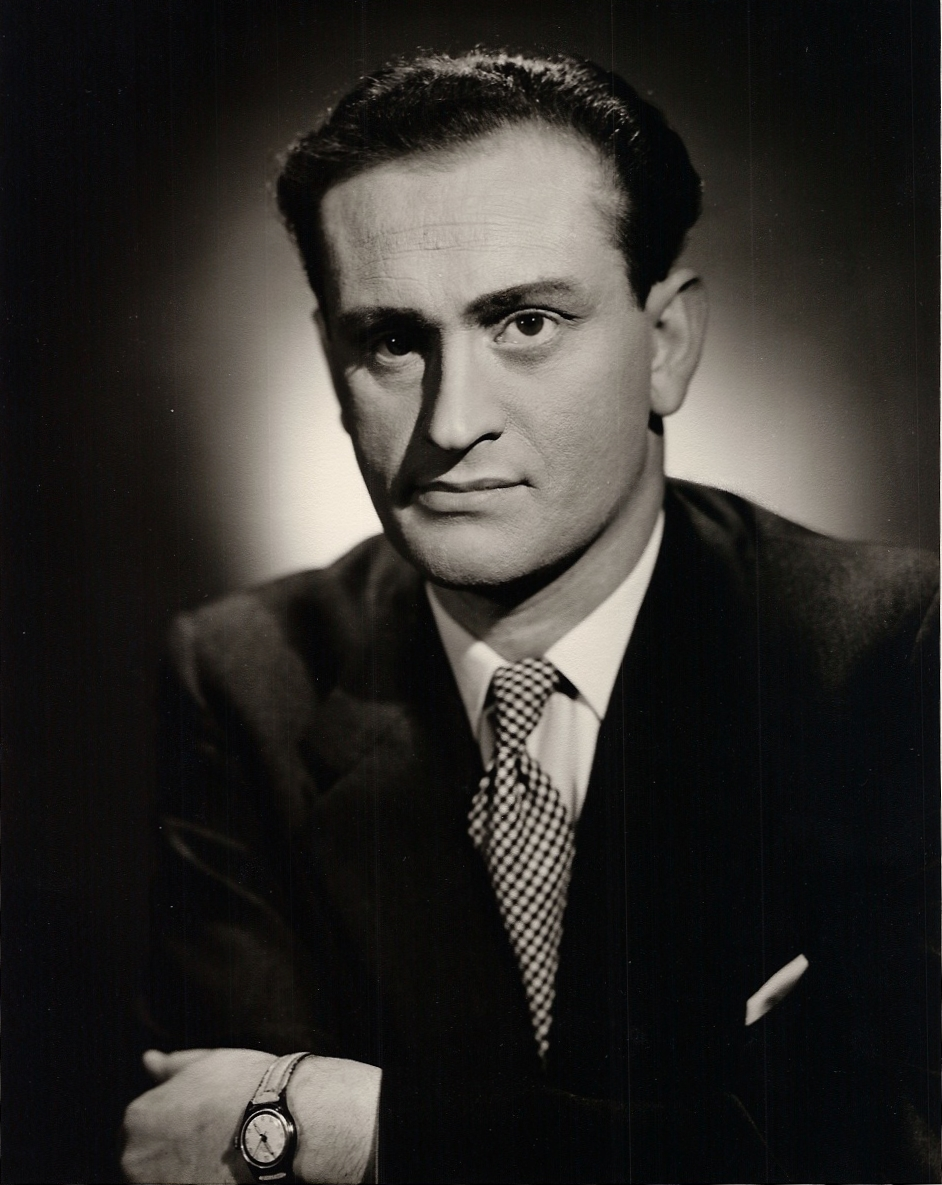
- Born: Robert Henry Marsden; 22 August 1921; West Hampstead, London, England
- Died: 5 April 2007 (aged 85); Elstree, Hertfordshire, England
- Occupation(s): Actor, theatre director, dramatic recitalist, drama teacher
- Years active: 1939–1966
- Spouse: Sally Brice (divorced)

Robert Marsden (22 August 1921 – 5 April 2007) was an English actor, director, dramatic recitalist and teacher of drama at the Royal Academy of Dramatic Art, and elsewhere. He was also one of the earliest (and latest surviving) wartime members of the BBC Radio Drama Repertory Company, formed to meet the circumstances of World War II.

== Biography ==
Robert Marsden was born in West Hampstead, London. His theatre training was at LAMDA, the London Mask Theatre School, RADA, and the Webber Douglas Academy of Dramatic Art.

He made his professional debut in Warrington, Lancashire (now Cheshire) in 1939.

In Stratford-on-Avon, aged nineteen, he played a round of Shakespearean roles, including Tybalt in Romeo & Juliet, Hotspur in Richard II and Tranio in The Taming of the Shrew. He first broadcast in 1942, and played a variety of parts, including Robert in The Letter, Chorus to Laurence Olivier's Henry V and the disciple Philip in Dorothy L. Sayers' play cycle on Jesus The Man Born to Be King.

In London, he was in John Drinkwater's Abraham Lincoln both at the Westminster in 1940 and at the Playhouse in 1943. At the Arts he played leading parts in The Rivals, The Constant Couple etc. In 1944 he appeared at the Chanticleer Theatre in such plays as The Lady From the Sea and as the title character in John Gabriel Borkman.

The following year he was approached by John Gielgud about Rodney Ackland's adaptation of Crime and Punishment, and he played the leading character's friend with Gielgud, Edith Evans and Peter Ustinov at the New Theatre, and elsewhere. Gielgud also cast him in Medea at the Globe Theatre.

Marsden's next broadcast was as Young Marlow in She Stoops To Conquer, playing opposite Angela Baddeley. He continued to freelance in radio, his roles including the title part in Macbeth, Orsino in Twelfth Night, Tybalt (as at Stratford) and the King in Love's Labour's Lost.

He was a fine pianist, and accompanied his own singing, on the air and later in recitations. He composed revue material and comic songs, such as a witty setting of Carroll's Jabberwocky. On radio in the mid-fifties he played the title role in the series Mike Dudley, Charter Pilot. He was also a regular in the Bunkle series with Billie Whitelaw, and he acted in In Parenthesis with Dylan Thomas.

He also appeared on television, parts ranging from Antonio in The Tempest, to the sinister Black Dog in Treasure Island with Bernard Miles.

In Fry's The Boy with a Cart, he played one of the brothers in the West End with Richard Burton, and a different one on TV. At the Guildford Repertory Theatre in 1951 he was Claudius to the Hamlet of Laurence Payne. The leading critic J. C. Trewin wrote of him as a Claudius "who, for all his draughts of Rhenish, was a regal statesman". In 1956 at the Phoenix he was in Peter Brook's production of The Power & the Glory with Paul Scofield (with whom he had trained).

His career as a director began at Whitby, and included Guildford (where he directed Philip Bond in Richard II) and Coventry. At Preston he played Othello and co-directed it. He also worked with Joan Littlewood at Stratford East.

In 1959 he 'did the hat-trick' with Abraham Lincoln, playing the name character at the Belgrade, Coventry. At the Belgrade he also played Shylock in The Merchant of Venice and Brutus in Julius Caesar. Brutus's boy servant Lucius was played by Michael Crawford.

On television, he played Lincoln in the first episode of the Doctor Who serial The Chase, reciting about half of the Gettysburg Address. The episode was directed by Richard Martin who had been in the cast of the Drinkwater play with him at the Belgrade.

At Birmingham Rep in 1961 Marsden was Enobarbus in Antony & Cleopatra. He also performed at Hampstead Theatre in its early days, playing in He Who Gets Slapped.

He started to vary his acting with work as a drama teacher, at RADA, Central School and the City Lit, as well as privately. He also gave solo recitations, which were both dramatic and musical.

In 1965, Robert Marsden rejoined the Stratford-based Shakespeare company, now called the Royal Shakespeare Company. He had played the major role of the Chorus in Henry V on radio to Laurence Olivier as Henry, and now he succeeded Eric Porter in the part at the Aldwych Theatre in London, with Ian Holm as the King. A review recorded "Chorus stands four-square in the Elizabethan age, an imposing amalgam of Drake and Raleigh as presented by Robert Marsden."

While with the RSC, he was in the earliest of their Theatre-Go-Round outreach programmes for school pupils, and he played Boretzki in Peter Weiss's disturbing compilation from the concentration camp hearings, The Investigation. Performed at the Aldwych, it was audio recorded by the BBC and broadcast more than once.

After this, though he appeared both live and on television again, he did not work much as an actor. Having lost the sight of one eye in an accident in his youth, he developed glaucoma, and lost much of his sight in his forties. One of his latest personal appearances was at a verse recital performing alongside Dame Peggy Ashcroft and Jeremy Brett. For many years he continued as a private drama teacher, specialising in coaching intense voice work.

He lived with and was then married to Sally, née Brice (1951–2012). They divorced, but remained friends.

Marsden died on 5 April 2007 at Elstree, Hertfordshire.

== Filmography ==
- The Hostage (1956) - Benda
- Licensed to Kill (1965) - August Jacobsen
