= John Scott Martin =

English actor (1926–2009)

- John Scott Martin on the set of the Doctor Who serial The Power of the Daleks (1966)
- Born: 1 April 1926; Toxteth, Liverpool, Lancashire, England
- Died: 6 January 2009 (aged 82); Great Maplestead, Essex, England
- Occupation: Actor

John Scott Martin (1 April 1926 – 6 January 2009) was an English actor born in Toxteth, Liverpool, Lancashire. He made many film, stage and television appearances, but one of his most famous, though unseen, roles was as a Dalek operator in the long-running BBC science fiction television series Doctor Who.

== Career ==
Martin operated Daleks from 1965's The Chase through 1988's Remembrance of the Daleks making him the longest-running Dalek operator. He worked with eight different actors in the title role of the Doctor from William Hartnell to Sylvester McCoy, and also Richard Hurndall, who took on the role of the First Doctor in "The Five Doctors". Typically, Martin would operate the first Dalek when a group of three entered a scene, due largely to his long tenure on the programme. He also operated other Doctor Who monster costumes including the insectoid Zarbi in The Web Planet, and the robotic Mechanoids in The Chase. Martin made his first on screen appearance in The Dæmons, in which he appeared (uncredited) as Charlie, postmaster of Devils End, in three episodes. Martin also had a cameo in the BBC series The Tripods.

Some of his other television credits include various roles in I, Claudius, Z-Cars and Softly, Softly, as well as a TV Technician in Quatermass and the Pit, as Brown in Some Mothers Do 'Ave 'Em, as a waiter in The Good Life, as Hawke in Poldark (1977) and as Rico Vivaldi in five episodes of the 2004 comedy Mine All Mine, written by Russell T. Davies.

His film credits include a dancing instructor in a brief scene in Alan Parker's film adaption of Pink Floyd's The Wall, and small roles in Ali G Indahouse, Little Shop of Horrors, Erik the Viking and The Crimson Permanent Assurance segment of The Meaning of Life.

He appeared on the West End stage in shows like Kismet, Oliver! and The Streets of London. In the Manchester Opera House production of Fiddler on the Roof featuring Topol in the starring role, he played the Rabbi.

== Death ==
Martin suffered from Parkinson's disease in later life. He died on 6 January 2009.

== Partial filmography ==
- The Blood Beast Terror (1968) – Snaflebum
- The Private Life of Sherlock Holmes (1970) – Scientist (uncredited)
- Jude the Obscure (1971) – Doctor
- No Sex Please, We're British (1973) – White Line Workman
- Pink Floyd – The Wall (1982) – Dancing Teacher
- Monty Python's The Meaning of Life (1983) – (segment "The Crimson Permanent Assurance")
- Young Sherlock Holmes (1985) – Cemetery Caretaker
- Little Shop of Horrors (1986) – 'Downtown' Bum #3
- Little Dorrit (1987) – Faded Insolvent
- Erik the Viking (1989) – Ingemund the Old
- Bullseye! (1990) – Old Jeweller
- Beg! (1994) – Nightwatchman
- Out of Depth (2000) – Joe
- Ali G Indahouse (2001) – Mr. Johnson
