= Edmund Warwick =

British actor (1907–1989)

- Born: Edmund Harry Louis Clowes; 15 July 1907; London, England
- Died: 21 December 1989 (aged 82); Portsmouth, Hampshire, England
- Occupation: Actor
- Years active: 1923–1978

Edmund Warwick (15 July 1907 – 21 December 1989) was a British actor who appeared in various ITV and BBC television serials during the 1950s to 1970s.

== Career ==
Despite having no formal training, Warwick made his acting debut on 26 December 1923 in a production of Bluebell in Fairyland at the Aldwych Theatre. This was followed by further appearances on the stage using his birth name Edmund Clowes.

During the Second World War, Warwick served in the Royal Air Force as a leading aircraftman. After the war ended, he ventured into television work before becoming producer at Felixstowe Arts Theatre during 1947–1948.

Around 1950, the actor changed his name to Edmund Warwick. He spent the next few years managing theatres, helping to get them back on their feet, such as the Playhouse Theatre at Broadstairs, Shrewsbury Repertory Theatre and the Portsmouth Theatre Royal.

Some of his TV credits included The Adventures of Sir Lancelot, The Adventures of Robin Hood (where he played 15 different characters), Emergency Ward 10, Z-Cars, No Hiding Place and Doctor Who.

In Dr Who, Warwick portrayed the character of Darrius in The Keys of Marinus, doubled for William Hartnell as the First Doctor in The Dalek Invasion of Earth after the lead actor was injured during filming. He also played a robot double of Hartnell's Doctor in The Chase, this duplicate having been created by the Daleks.

Warwick also played Clifton James' double of Montgomery in the 1958 film I Was Monty's Double.

== Personal life ==
Warwick was married three times: firstly to Ivy Wilcox (m. 1930), then to Doreen O'Currey (m. 1943) and finally actress Lynette Mills (m. 1957). The latter divorced him in 1968 after he committed adultery.

Devoted to the theatre, Warwick single-handedly took on then-Chancellor of the Exchequer Rab Butler in 1954 over the crippling Entertainment Tax, which was levied on every theatre ticket sold, regardless of whether or not shows were making a profit. Butler would not relent and although his successor Harold Macmillan would remove the tax, it came too late for Warwick, who was forced to close two theatres and end up £5000 in debt.

In later years, having retired from acting and unable to get out much due to poor health, Warwick kept himself busy by penning sketches, scripts and songs, hoping to send them to the likes of Russ Abbot and Benny Hill. A long-time fan of Doctor Who, the actor watched the show until its cancellation in 1989 (but was critical of Sylvester McCoy's portrayal of the character). A couple of weeks after the airing of the final classic series serial Survival, Warwick was rushed to St Mary's Hospital, Portsmouth with respiratory problems, dying shortly afterwards.
