= Bill Strutton =

Australian screenwriter and novelist (1918–2003)

- Born: William Harold Strutton; 23 February 1918; South Australia, Australia
- Died: 23 November 2003 (aged 85); Catalonia, Spain
- Occupation: screenwriter
- Known for: Doctor Who, Ivanhoe

William Harold Strutton (23 February 1918 – 23 November 2003) was an Australian screenwriter and novelist. He worked on television shows such as Ivanhoe, The Saint, The Avengers, Riptide and Doctor Who.

== Early life ==
Born in Moonta in rural South Australia, Bill Strutton was the youngest of four children born to the local bank manager. He won a state scholarship to university at 14 but dropped out after two years to work as an office clerk in Adelaide. Prior to the outbreak of World War II, he joined the Australian army. Seeing the last evacuation boat leave the island, he was captured by the Germans during the Battle of Crete and along with other prisoners, was force-marched through Italy, Austria and Germany, and sent to a prisoner of war camp. At one stage his mother Mabel received the news that two out of her three sons were listed as missing in action. It was in Stalag VII that he began to take an interest in writing. He once said: "My first year as a prisoner-of-war was the most interesting in my life. The ensuing three were the most boring – but more instructive I think, than any university. I learned several languages: German from a Serbian horse-doctor; Spanish from a Basque; a Parisian taxi-driver bequeathed me a startling vocabulary. Assisted by a mentor I ran a camp newspaper, caught up on my reading, and finally celebrated our liberation by tearing up a novel." He survived escaping twice and being recaptured and after being demobbed, he lived in England for some time. In the 1950s and 60s, he lived with his wife, Margarita Luzzatto and their two children in Woldingham, East Surrey. His later marriages were to Dianne Aspel and later, Virginia Bolt. He retired to Spain in 1990, and pursued painting in watercolour.

== Career ==
After the war, he had begun a career in journalism and started to write thrillers and military books in the mid-fifties. These included The Secret Invaders, A Jury of Angels in 1957 and Island of Terrible Friends in 1961. Also, three films. In 1958, he contributed to launching the career of one of the world's most beloved actors by scripting the Ivanhoe television series which starred Roger Moore. He also collaborated with Moore in the seminal series "The Saint". He wrote for more than fifteen television series in eleven years, such as Emergency Ward 10 with Bud Tingwell. One later collaboration saw the launch of the adventure series "The Adventures of the Seaspray", unique for its time, featuring the filming of the striking sailboat and its family crew on exactly the geographical co-ordinates where each story was set. The last television work was Strange Report, starring Anthony Quayle, and several episodes of Paul Temple before retiring in 1978 following a heart attack.

His Doctor Who story was The Web Planet in 1965. It is remembered as a unique Doctor Who serial. It was the first programme to feature a completely alien cast, including Martin Jarvis as a butterfly Menoptera, and introduced the menacing Zarbi. Two of its six episodes are amongst the handful of Doctor Who instalments to be seen by more than 13m people on original transmission. Strutton went on to adapt the serial as the third Doctor Who novel in 1965. In 1972, he submitted another storyline to Doctor Who entitled The Mega, but this was rejected. It was later adapted as an audio drama that was released in 2013.

== Death ==
Bill Strutton died on 23 November 2003 in Calella, Spain, on the day of Doctor Who's fortieth anniversary, aged 85 years.
