= John Maxim =

British actor (1925–1990)

- Born: John Waldemar Maxim; 20 July 1925; Sydney, Australia
- Died: 20 January 1990 (aged 64); Brighton, Sussex, England
- Other name: John Wills
- Occupation: Actor
- Years active: 1958–1988

John Maxim (20 July 1925 — 20 January 1990), sometimes credited as John Wills, was an English film and television actor.

== Career ==
Between 1958 and 1988, he appeared in six films and nine television productions including the films The Frightened City (1961), She (1965), and Dracula: Prince of Darkness (1966). His television work included guest appearances in Ivanhoe, The Adventures of William Tell as Trooper Strauss in episode 24, "The Ensign" and Captain Markheim in episode 25, "The Unwelcome Stranger", as well as playing Number 86 in The Prisoner. He also appeared in two Doctor Who serials: The Chase as Frankenstein's monster and The Moonbase as a Cyberman (the latter credited as John Wills).

== Filmography ==
Year	Title	Role	Notes
1960	The Brides of Dracula	Inn Customer	Uncredited
1961	Mary Had a Little...	Burley Shavely	
1961	The Frightened City	Lippy Green	
1964	Goldfinger	Gangster	Uncredited
1965	She	Guard Captain	
1965	The Brigand of Kandahar	Nasty Jailer	Uncredited
1966	Dracula: Prince of Darkness	Coach Driver	
1967	Frankenstein Created Woman	Sergeant	Uncredited
1988	Young Toscanini	Comparsa	Uncredited, (final film role)
