= Suzanne Neve =

English actress (born 1939)

- Born: 6 September 1939 (age 87); London, England
- Occupation: Actress
- Years active: 1961–1983
- Spouse: Richard Martin

Suzanne Neve (born 6 September 1939) is an English actress. She appeared regularly on British television during the 1960s, including the lead role of Isabel Archer in the BBC's 1968 adaptation of Henry James's The Portrait of a Lady, for which she won Outstanding Television Personality in the Pye Colour Television Awards.

Neve had supporting roles in Backfire! (1962) and Play It Cool (1962), but came to wider public attention as Ethel Brown in a 1962 series based on the William books of Richmal Crompton. She subsequently had leading roles in Smuggler's Bay (1964) and as Fleur de Lys in a dramatisation of The Hunchback of Notre Dame (1966). Her big break came with the BBC's flagship production of The Forsyte Saga (1967), in which she played Holly Forsyte. She was also in Naked Evil (1966), Mosquito Squadron (1969) and Scrooge (1970).

Neve continued to appear in television dramas, including further adaptations of the classics, such as Bel Ami (1971). She also had a recurring role as Mary, the former wife of Commander Straker, in the science fiction series UFO (1970–71). Her last screen appearance was in the series Spooky (1983). Later she worked as a teacher of drama.
