= Richard Martin (British director) =

British actor and director (born 1935)

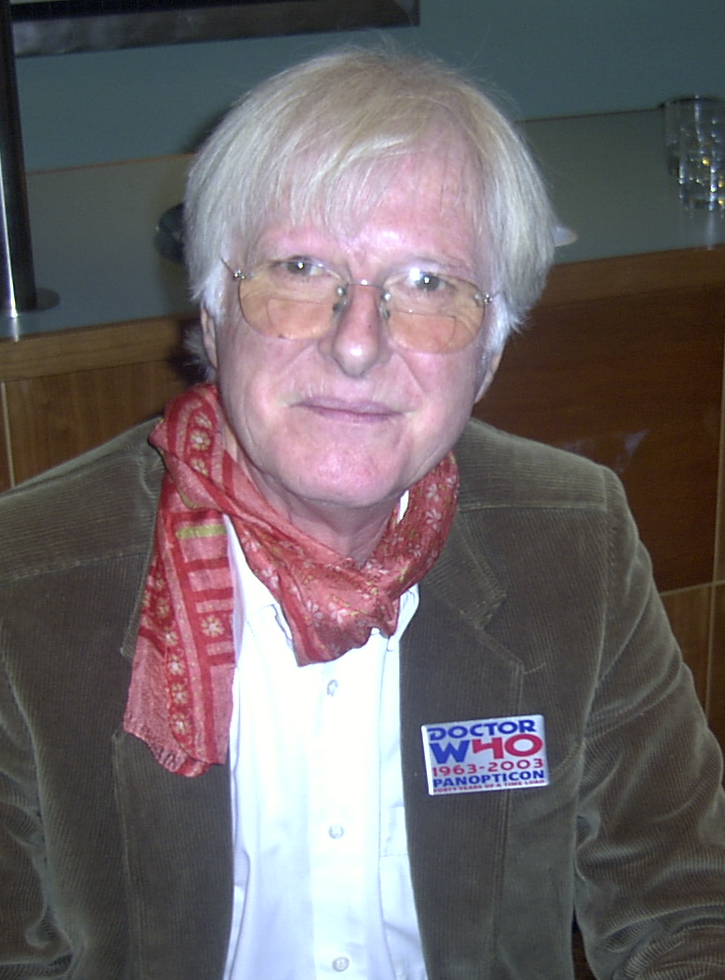
- Martin at the 2003 PanoptiCon
- Born: Richard Martin Thomas; 3 January 1935 (age 90)
- Occupation(s): Actor, director
- Years active: 1958–1990
- Spouse: Suzanne Neve

Richard Martin (born 3 January 1935) is a British retired television director and actor. After starting his career as an actor, he worked regularly as a director throughout the 1960s, 1970s and 1980s, which included directing several early serials of Doctor Who starring William Hartnell, and series such as Compact, Crown Court and All Creatures Great and Small. He is married to actress Suzanne Neve.

== Doctor Who ==
After having acted in the 1958 television series Ivanhoe and the 1960 series Maigret, Martin was asked to join the production team working on yet to be broadcast series Doctor Who by caretaker producer Rex Tucker. He worked on Doctor Who during its first two seasons, from 1963 to 1965. Martin directed part of the second story of the inaugural season of Doctor Who, The Daleks, in which the titular villains were first introduced. During the making of The Daleks, Martin persuaded producer Verity Lambert to approach the story in a less conservative manner. Martin also directed two additional stories featuring the Daleks for the second season of Doctor Who, The Dalek Invasion of Earth and The Chase.

Martin directed two other Doctor Who stories. He directed the first episode of The Edge of Destruction, which immediately followed The Daleks in season 1, and the entire season 2 story The Web Planet. For the latter story, Martin wanted to film through a special camera lens to make the planet appear more "alien," but due to budget constraints he had to resort to covering the lens with vaseline to achieve the effect, which many viewers found distracting.

In 2013, the BBC praised Martin's direction of The Edge of Destruction for how it "wrings every available ounce of suspense, horror and mystery" from a script that features only the show's four regular characters. They also praised his direction of certain scenes from The Dalek Invasion of Earth. Authors Tat Wood and Lawrence Miles credit Martin for "the most impressive effect" in The Daleks, that of "the wall blistering under the Daleks' weapons." Authors Paul Cornell, Martin Day and Keith Topping regard The Daleks as being "brilliantly directed."

However, Wood and Miles criticised Martin for permitting outside noises such as studio doors opening and closing to be heard during stories he directs, and describe the direction of The Dalek Invasion of Earth as "mistimed," while acknowledging that the "grit and darkness" of some scenes are "enough to hold the attention for a while." Wood and Miles also consider Martin responsible for The Web Planet not working, for example by not objecting to the "creaky" sets. Author Mark Campbell also criticizes this story as being "badly directed." Critic John Kenneth Muir concurs that The Web Planet is "badly filmed," but praises the story for being an experiment in showing a truly alien world, which according to Wood and Miles was the type of story Martin had been wanting Doctor Who to do. Wood and Miles consider Martin to have been "hopelessly out of his depth" in directing The Chase, suggesting that the previous story, The Space Museum, would have played to his strengths as a director instead. Journalist Peter Haining had a different opinion of Martin's direction of The Chase, claiming that Martin's use of techniques such as fast intercuts, overlays and animation made the final battle of the story "one of the finest battle scenes ever filmed for Doctor Who." Martin himself attributes the flaws with The Web Planet and The Chase to inadequate budgets, and in the case of The Chase restrictions on his use of moving camera techniques.

== Later work ==
Martin worked on a great number of television series and documentaries after Doctor Who, including Crown Court, A Family at War, Six Days of Justice, BBC2 Playhouse, Elizabeth R, The Mallens and many others. His final TV work was in 1990 on All Creatures Great and Small.

== Legacy ==
In the 2013 docudrama An Adventure in Space and Time, Martin was portrayed by writer Mark Gatiss's husband, actor Ian Hallard. He was also interviewed for Matthew Sweet's 50th anniversary Doctor Who special of The Culture Show, entitled "Me, You and Doctor Who".

Peter Purves, who portrayed Steven Taylor in Doctor Who and later became a presenter for Blue Peter, credits Martin for being "responsible for [his] career ever taking off."
