= Kevin Manser =

Australian actor (1929–2001)

- Born: Kevin Baden Manser; 16 February 1929; Adelaide, South Australia
- Died: 21 December 2001 (aged 72); New South Wales, Australia
- Resting place: Enfield Memorial Park, Clearview, South Australia
- Occupation: Actor
- Years active: 1957–2001
- Known for: Dalek prop operator in Doctor Who (1960s)

Kevin Baden Manser (16 February 1929 – 21 December 2001) was an Australian actor best known for his career as a Dalek operator in the early seasons of the British science-fiction television series Doctor Who.

He was born in Adelaide and worked for South Australian Engineering and Water Supply until 1957, when he emigrated to London to work as a stage manager. This led to later work as a theatrical and television actor. In 1969 he returned to Australia and continued to play small parts on television while becoming involved with Doctor Who conventions. He wrote his autobiography, The Memoirs of a Dalek, in 2001, after being diagnosed with the cancer that eventually resulted in his death at the end of that year.

Amongst his TV and film roles, included appearances in the TV mini-series Bodyline (1984) and The Dismissal (1983), the film The Year My Voice Broke (1987) and appearing as Australian prime-minister William McMahon in the mini-series Vietnam (1987).

== Filmography ==
=== Film ===
Year	Title	Role	Notes
1965	Dr. Who and the Daleks	Dalek Operator	TV series
1967	A Countess from Hong Kong	Photographer	Feature film
1969	Cry Wolf	Town clerk	Feature film
1975	Scobie Malone		Feature film
1975	Ride a Wild Pony		Feature film
1978	The Night the Prowler	Citizen in bushes	Feature film
1978	Cass		TV movie
1979	Dawn!	Official	Documentary film /biopic
1987	The Year My Voice Broke	Mr. Keith	Feature film

=== Television ===
Year	Title	Role	Notes
1963–66	Doctor Who	Dalek Operator, Zarbi Operator	Season 1, 6 episodes Season 2, 15 episodes Season 3, 12 episodes Season 4, 4 episodes
1965	The Big Spender	Bank manager	
1966	Thirteen Against Fate	Auctioneer	Season 1, episode 10: "The Son"
1967	Mrs Thursday	Mr. Bileman	Season 2, episode 3: "The Train from Dunrich House"
1968	Never Mind the Quality, Feel the Width	Registrar	Season 2, episode 6: "Hello Mother, Hello Father"
1972	Spyforce	Dr. Henry Holmann	Season 1, episode 22: "The Doctor"
1972	Number 96	Mr. Fulton	TV series
1975	Homicide	Sid Goodwin	Season 1, episode 461: "The Long Weekend"
1975	Shannon's Mob	Harry Davis	Season 1, episode 3: "Trip to Nowhere"
1976	Rush	Weinbaum	Season 2, episode 8: "I'll See You Dead McKeller"
1979	Chopper Squad	Docker	Season 2, episode 10: "Freedom"
1981	Bellamy	Gleeson	Season 1, episode 13: "The Siege"
1982	A Country Practice	Sol Manning	Season 2, 2 episodes
1983	The Dismissal		TV mini-series
1983	Prisoner	Phillip Bates, Vicar	Season 1, 4 episodes
1984	Bodyline		TV miniseries
1987	Vietnam	William McMahon	TV miniseries
1988	Richnond Hill	Bank manager	TV series
1994	Mother and Son	Butcher #2	Season 6, episode 6: "The Promise"
2001	All Saints	Bill Kennedy	Season 4, 2 episodes
