= Robert Jewell =

Australian actor

Robert George Jewell
- Born: 20 January 1920; Australia
- Died: 10 May 1998 (aged 78); Melbourne, Victoria, Australia
- Occupation: Actor
- Years active: 1962–1987
- Spouse: Esther Jewell Irene Jewell
- Children: Sandra Papavasiliou (now Jewell); Helen Jewell; Alison Jewell; Alan Jewell

Robert Jewell (20 January 1920 – 10 May 1998) was an Australian actor who mostly worked as a Dalek or other robot operator on Doctor Who in the late 1960s, also playing a cameo as Bing Crosby in the serial The Daleks' Master Plan. He later returned to Australia and played small recurring roles in Prisoner during the 1980s. Previous to travelling to England, Robert Jewell was in many stage shows including 'Moomba' in Melbourne and also did skits in 'In Melbourne Tonight'. He was stage manager at 'His Majestys Theatre' in Melbourne where Bert Newton and Toni Lamond performed.

In his later years, he formed a small group who travelled to Aged people's homes and put on performances. His eldest daughter, Sandra Papavasiliou (now Jewell), was interviewed by Spencer Howson of ABC Radio (Brisbane) on the subject of Daleks.

== Filmography ==
=== Film ===
Year	Title	Role	Notes
1965	Dr. Who and the Daleks	Dalek Operator	
1966	Daleks' Invasion Earth 2150 A.D.	Leader Dalek Operator	
1967	The Terrornauts	Robot Operator	

=== Television ===
Year	Title	Role	Notes
1962; 1963	Consider Your Verdict	Unknown; Dave Betts	Season 1: 2 episodes
1963–1967; 1969	Doctor Who	Dalek / Dalek Machine Operator; Zarbi/Zarbi Operator; Clown; Macra	Season 1: 6 episodes Season 2: 12 episodes Season 3: 13 episodes Season 4: 15 episodes Season 6, Episode 44: The War Games: "Episode 10"
1979; 1983; 1985; 1986	Prisoner: Cell Block H	Truck Driver; Delivery Man; Van Driver; Bluey; Andy	Season 1: 5 episodes
1987	The Flying Doctors	Grazier	Season 3, Episode 7: "Figures in a Landscape", (final appearance)
