= Raymond Cusick =

English designer (1928–2013)

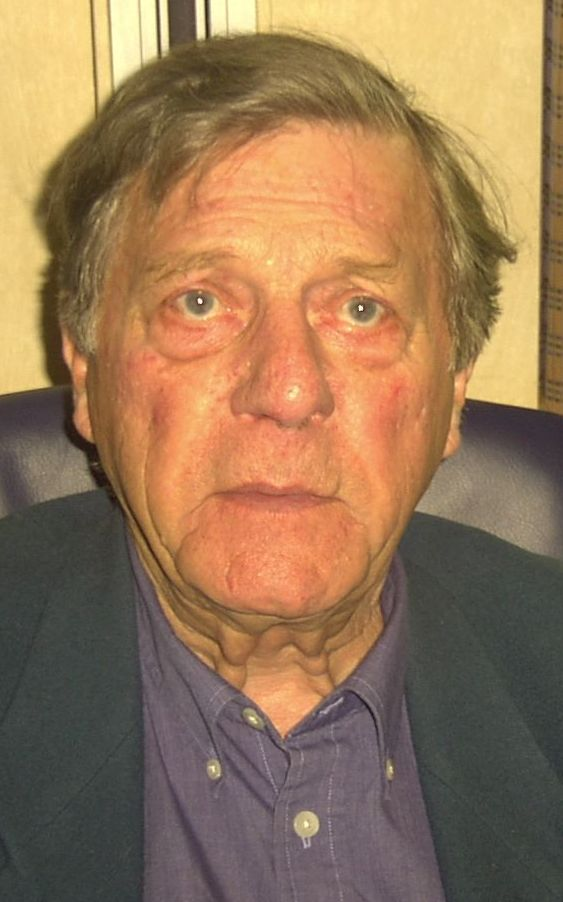
- Cusick in 2003
- Born: Raymond Patrick Cusick; 28 April 1928; Lambeth, London, England
- Died: 21 February 2013 (aged 84); Horsham, West Sussex, England
- Occupation: Staff designer
- Employer: BBC
- Known for: Designing the Daleks
- Children: 2

Raymond Patrick Cusick (28 April 1928 – 21 February 2013) was an English designer for the BBC. He is best known for designing the Daleks, a race of aliens who move around in tank-like travel machines, for the science fiction television series Doctor Who.

Born in the Lambeth district of London, Cusick became interested in engineering while still at art school and began attending evening classes. However, his father wanted him to follow a more regular career, so Cusick took a course in mathematics and science at Borough Polytechnic, intending to become a civil engineer. Not finding this to his liking, he enlisted instead in the British Army and found himself stationed in Palestine, but did not enjoy that experience either. On his return to England he completed a teacher training course, but then obtained a nine-month position in repertory theatre at the Prince of Wales Theatre in Cardiff.

In the late 1950s Cusick briefly took a position teaching art but applied and was accepted for a post at the Wimbledon Theatre where he remained for three years. Cusick joined the BBC in 1960 as a staff designer and was responsible for the set design of many Doctor Who stories, creating not just futuristic settings but also historical sets and dioramas. Another BBC in-house designer, future filmmaker Ridley Scott, had been assigned to design the Daleks in 1963, but scheduling conflicts saw the job handed to Cusick. Cusick worked on other BBC television programmes including The Pallisers, The Duchess of Duke Street, On Giant's Shoulders, When the Boat Comes In, Rentaghost and Miss Marple.

As Cusick was a salaried BBC employee at the time he designed the Daleks, he was not paid royalties. Given the large revenue generated by merchandise featuring Cusick's Dalek design, he felt that he should have been paid a royalty (as was script writer Terry Nation, who created the concept of the Daleks but did not design them). When Cusick left Doctor Who in 1966, unhappy with the lack of recognition he had received for his work on the series, the show's producer and head designer did arrange for the BBC to recognise his contribution with an ex-gratia payment of around £100.

In the late 1970s, he was a designer for the James Burke BBC programme Connections. He lived near Horsham, West Sussex. After retiring as an art director for the BBC in 1988, his hobby was writing about battles from the Napoleonic era—he contributed to a number of specialist magazines and periodicals on the subject.

Cusick was interviewed for the BBC video release Daleks: The Early Years (1992) and in July 2008 he appeared in an episode of the BBC Three documentary series Doctor Who Confidential. In both instances, Cusick spoke of the original Dalek design and how the concept came to fruition.

The end titles of the 2016 animated reconstruction of The Power of the Daleks (1966) give official credit to Cusick for designing the Daleks.

== Personal life ==
Cusick was a widower with two daughters and seven grandchildren. He died of heart failure in his sleep after a short illness on 21 February 2013 at age 84.
