= The Space Museum =

015 – The Space Museum
- Doctor Who serial
- Barbara, the Doctor, Vicki, and Ian on display at the Space Museum. This first episode was praised by critics and its cliffhanger is considered among the show's best.

Cast
- Doctor: William Hartnell – First Doctor
- Companions: William Russell – Ian Chesterton; Jacqueline Hill – Barbara Wright; Maureen O'Brien – Vicki
- Others: Richard Shaw – Lobos; Ivor Salter – Morok Commander; Salvin Stewart – Morok Messenger; Peter Diamond – Morok Technician, Morok; Lawrence Dean, Ken Norris, Salvin Stewart, Billy Cornelius – Moroks; Peter Sanders – Sita; Peter Craze – Dako; Jeremy Bulloch – Tor; Bill Starkey – Third Xeron; Michael Gordon, Edward Granville, Bill Starkey, David Wolliscroft – Xerons; Peter Hawkins – Dalek voice; Murphy Grumbar – Dalek Operator

Production
- Directed by: Mervyn Pinfield
- Written by: Glyn Jones
- Script editor: Dennis Spooner
- Produced by: Verity Lambert
- Music by: None (Note: The serial uses stock music from several composers: the first episode uses pieces from Trevor Duncan, Roberto Gerhard, Erik Nordgren, Eric Siday, Sidney Torch, and Jack Trombey; the second uses Siday, Buxton Orr, and Roger Roger; the third uses Orr, Don Banks, Wolf Droysen, Desmond Leslie, and Frank Talley; and the fourth uses Duncan, Siday, Talley, and Les Structures Sonores.)
- Production code: Q
- Series: Season 2
- Running time: 4 episodes, 25 minutes each
- First broadcast: 24 April 1965
- Last broadcast: 15 May 1965

Chronology
← Preceded by The Crusade	Followed by → The Chase

The Space Museum is the seventh serial of the second season of the British science fiction television series Doctor Who. Written by Glyn Jones and directed by Mervyn Pinfield, it was broadcast on BBC1 in four weekly parts from 24 April to 15 May 1965. In the serial, the First Doctor (William Hartnell) and his travelling companions Ian Chesterton (William Russell), Barbara Wright (Jacqueline Hill), and Vicki (Maureen O'Brien) arrive in a Space Museum on the planet Xeros, where they seek to change their fate after seeing themselves turned into museum exhibits in the future. They also become entangled in a conflict between the militaristic Moroks who run the museum, and the servile indigenous Xerons who work for them.

Jones was not familiar with the show or science fiction when asked to develop the storyline. Story editor Dennis Spooner edited out much of the humour from the original script as he felt that it was more intellectual; Jones was unhappy with the changes. Pinfield and the production crew hoped that The Space Museum could be made cheaply to offset more expensive serials, using a small cast and limited sets. Pinfield also used stock music recordings for the incidental score. The Space Museum received mixed reviews, with praise directed at its opening episode and the performances of Hartnell and O'Brien, but criticism of the remaining episodes, the formulaic nature of the story, and the performances of the supporting cast. The story was later novelised and released on VHS, DVD, and Blu-ray.

== Plot ==
The TARDIS arrives near a vast Space Museum on the planet Xeros, but has jumped a time-track. The First Doctor (William Hartnell), Ian Chesterton (William Russell), Barbara Wright (Jacqueline Hill), and Vicki (Maureen O'Brien) have a series of bizarre experiences as they venture outside and into the Museum; they see but cannot be seen by the militaristic Moroks who run the museum, and the servile indigenous Xerons who work for them. The museum contains fascinating exhibits, including a Dalek shell, and the four travellers discover that they and the TARDIS are on display. A few moments later, the time track slips back and the exhibit with themselves and the TARDIS vanish, but the travellers are still inside the Museum.

The head of the Moroks, Lobos (Richard Shaw), is a bored and desperate museum administrator and colony governor, who reflects sourly that the Morok Empire has become decadent and declined. The Moroks find the TARDIS and start tracking down the occupants who have become separated. The Doctor is the first to be found, but evades their interrogation tactics. Meanwhile, Vicki has made contact with the Xerons and, hearing of their enslavement, aids them in their plans to stage a revolution. They attack the Morok armoury and Vicki outwits its controlling computer. With their new weapons, the Xerons are able to begin a revolution, which slowly takes hold.

Ian has meanwhile freed the Doctor from Lobos, who had begun the process of freezing him and turning him into an exhibit. Ian and the Doctor are quickly recaptured by the Morok guards, and Barbara and Vicki are captured shortly thereafter. Help comes from the Xeron revolutionaries, who kill Lobos and the other Morok captors. The Xerons destroy the Museum. The Doctor, Ian, Barbara, and Vicki take a time/space visualiser as a souvenir and leave in the TARDIS. On the planet Skaro, their departure is noted by the Daleks.

== Production ==
=== Conception and writing ===
Around early October 1964, outgoing story editor David Whitaker asked South African writer Glyn Jones to develop a story for Doctor Who; Whitaker had seen Jones's play Early One Morning (1963) and later encountered him at a dinner party. Jones had never seen Doctor Who, nor was he particularly familiar with science fiction. After Whitaker left the series and was replaced by Dennis Spooner, Jones was asked to develop a four-part serial of his story. By late 1964, the serial was titled The Space Museum; the first episode was originally named "The Four Dimensions of Time", and by early 1965, the fourth episode was called "Zone Seven". Spooner edited out much of the humour from the original script, which Jones was unhappy with; Spooner felt that the serial was more intellectual.

Mervyn Pinfield was assigned to direct the serial in January 1965. The production crew hoped that The Space Museum could be made cheaply to offset more expensive serials like The Web Planet (1965), doing so with a small cast and few sets, and using Pinfield's technical experience to achieve visual effects without need for excessive filming. To save on cost, Pinfield used stock music recordings for the incidental score, including pieces from Trevor Duncan, Erik Nordgren, and Eric Siday. The sound effects provided by the BBC Radiophonic Workshop originated from previous recordings. The Dalek prop used in the first two episodes was one of those constructed for the first Dalek serial, The Daleks (1963–1964), while the one used at the end of the final episode had modified shoulder slats by Shawcraft Models. Several other set elements were borrowed from previous serials, such as the lecterns from The Sensorites (1964). The dummies in the third episode wore stock spacesuits from Quatermass II (1955). The visuals of the ray guns firing was achieved using a photographic flash.

=== Casting and characters ===
The script for the third episode was structured to omit the Doctor, as William Hartnell was scheduled to take a week's holiday. For the second episode, despite being in poor health, Hartnell insisted that Jeremy Bulloch grab him roughly to make the kidnap sequence look authentic. Maureen O'Brien felt uneasy working with Pinfield due to his old-fashioned approach, feeling that he did not provide sufficient direction to the cast. The Moroks were named for their moronic behaviour, and the name of their leader Lobos is derived from the word "lobotomy". The Xeron actors wore fake eyebrows, with make-up covering their own eyebrows; the fake eyebrows often fell off.

=== Filming ===
Early 35mm filming took place on 11 March 1965 at the BBC Television Film Studios, requiring few shots, including Vicki dropping the glass, and some panning and model sequences; for the former, O'Brien was released from rehearsals of "The Knight of Jaffa", the second episode of The Crusade. Rehearsals for the first episode began on 29 March at the London Transport Assembly Rooms at Wood Green. Weekly recording began on 2 April 1965 in Studio 4 at the BBC Television Centre; this was a temporary move from Riverside Studios. Jones attended the recording of the serial. During camera rehearsals for the first episode, the Cambridge University Boat Club visited the set and took an interest in the Dalek prop; they were visiting the Television Centre as it was the day before their annual rowing event, the 111th Boat Race. The shots in which the characters phase through objects were achieved by superimposing the image onto the set. The cutaway shots of the main cast standing motionless in display cases were filmed separately; Brian Proudfoot stood in as Hartnell's double, as he had done in The Reign of Terror (1964). Due to the complexity of the out-of-sequence recording, the first episode required a second editing session. The final episode was recorded on 23 April 1965.

== Reception ==
=== Broadcast and ratings ===
Episode	Title	Run time	Original release date	UK viewers (millions)	Appreciation Index
1	"The Space Museum"	23:38	24 April 1965	10.5	51
2	"The Dimensions of Time"	22:00	1 May 1965	9.2	53
3	"The Search"	23:33	8 May 1965	8.5	56
4	"The Final Phase"	22:15	15 May 1965	8.5	49

The serial was broadcast on BBC1 in four weekly parts from 24 April to 15 May 1965. The second episode was scheduled 10 minutes later than usual due to the 1965 FA Cup Final, while the third episode was broadcast 20 minutes later due to coverage of the 20th anniversary of VE Day. Viewership numbers were similar to the preceding serial, dropping from 10.5 million to 8.5 million viewers across the four weeks. The Appreciation Index began strong—the first three weeks received 51, 53, and 56, respectively—but fell sharply, with the final episode at 49. The original tapes of the first, third, and fourth episodes were cleared for wiping by the BBC on 17 August 1967, deemed to be of no further use; the second episode was cleared on 31 January 1969. A 16mm film recording of the third episode was retained by the BBC Film and Television Archives. In 1977, the entire serial was discovered at BBC Enterprises. It was screened by British Satellite Broadcasting on 22 September 1990, and by UK Gold in December 1992; the latter occasionally ran it as a compilation later. The BFI National Archive holds a copy of the serial.

=== Critical response ===
Radio Times described this scene of the Doctor in a Dalek casing as among the most memorable in an otherwise tedious story.

Birmingham Evening Mail's Ivor Jay praised the first episode's visual effects and called the concept "the most fascinating yet". A Times Educational Supplement article in May 1965 described the serial as "enormously contrived", adding that the series "has run out of imagination". An audience report prepared following the first episode's broadcast was generally positive, with praise directed at the exploration of unknown and extraordinary concepts—there was a general preference for futuristic stories instead of historical ones—though some viewers acknowledged that the show was becoming formulaic and found the episode slow. A second audience report, prepared following the final episode, was more critical, with criticism directed at the undeveloped ideas and rapid resolution, and the general repetitiveness of the show; some felt that Hartnell was often unsure of his lines, and the supporting actors and small sets were criticised.

Retrospective reviews were mixed. In The Television Companion (1998), David J. Howe and Stephen James Walker considered the first episode promising and the general concept fascinating, but felt that the story "falls as flat as a pancake"; they lauded the main cast, particularly Maureen O'Brien, but criticised the supporting cast, describing Richard Shaw's role as "one of the worst performances yet seen in the series". In A Critical History of Doctor Who (1999), John Kenneth Muir praised the story's use of two prominent science fiction themes—changing the future, and discovering one's own death and attempting to alter it—comparing it favourably to The Twilight Zone, though he felt that it was diminished by the trope of planetary revolution as previously told in The Daleks and The Web Planet. In 2009, Mark Braxton of Radio Times felt that the story "kicks off so well", but failed to take the opportunity to discuss ideas such as predestination; he praised Vicki's "vibrant" character, and described the scene of the Doctor in a Dalek casing as "one of the few elements that make this rather tedious traipse memorable".

In 2010, Total Sci-Fi Online's Jonathan Wilkins similarly enjoyed the first episode, but described the remaining three as "dull, bog-standard Who" that "plods rather than races towards a deeply unsatisfactory climax". SFX's Nick Setchfield enjoyed the "lovely fourth-dimensional weirdness" of the first episode and the "refreshing" Moroks reminiscent of Douglas Adams's work, but ultimately criticised the serial for being a dull representation on the show's formulaic "rebels vs despots" storyline. Writing for Doctor Who Magazine, Graham Kibble-White said that the first episode falsely set the audience up for "three more weeks of high-concept plotting", which ultimately became "dreary" except for some of Hartnell's charm. Cliff Chapman of Den of Geek considered the first episode "slow and never really paid-off" and criticised the performances of the guest stars, but lauded the camera direction, effects work, and main cast. DVD Talk's John Sinnott praised the mysterious storyline and comedic moments. Charlie Jane Anders of io9 listed the first episode's cliffhanger as among the programme's best. In 2021, Catriona Mills identified the Space Museum as an inverse of British museums: while the former displays conquests on a colonised planet, the latter displays colonial treasures in the heart of an empire.

== Commercial releases ==
The Space Museum
- Author: Glyn Jones
- Cover artist: David McAllister
- Series: Doctor Who book: Target novelisations
- Release number: 117
- Publisher: Target Books
- Publication date: 1987
- ISBN: 0-426-20289-9

A novelisation of this serial, written by Glyn Jones, was published by Target Books and W. H. Allen & Co. in 1987. Jones altered the story's structure and restored the humour removed by Spooner. BBC Audiobooks released a double-CD soundtrack of the serial in May 2009, with narration by Maureen O'Brien; the set also included an interview with O'Brien. It was later included in AudioGO's Doctor Who: The TV Episodes: Collection 6 in September 2013, alongside the original camera scripts. Selected stock music from the serial was included in Space Adventures, a cassette soundtrack compiled by Julian Knott and published by DWAS Reference Department in September 1987, limited to 300 copies; it was re-issued as a CD in October 1998 with some additional material from the story.

The Space Museum was released on VHS in a three-videotape box set by BBC Worldwide in June 1999, alongside the first and third episodes of The Crusade; it also included postcards and a key ring. The serial was released on a DVD box set alongside the following serial, The Chase in March 2010. The DVD includes audio commentary with William Russell, Maureen O'Brien, Glyn Jones, and Peter Purves, as well as documentaries about the production, the cast's holidays, and Hartnell as told by his granddaughter. The serial was released on Blu-ray on 5 December 2022, alongside the rest of the show's second season as part of The Collection, and was added to BBC iPlayer on 1 November 2023 alongside most other serials.

== Bibliography ==
- Ainsworth, John, ed. (2016). "The Crusade, The Space Museum, The Chase and The Time Meddler". Doctor Who: The Complete History. 5 (11). London: Panini Comics, Hachette Partworks. ISSN 2057-6048.
- Howe, David J.; Walker, Stephen James (1998). Doctor Who: The Television Companion: Volume 1 (2021 ed.). London: BBC Books. ISBN 978-1-84583-156-1.
- Kibble-White, Graham (1 April 2010). "DVD Review: The Space Museum/The Chase". Doctor Who Magazine (420). Royal Tunbridge Wells, Kent: Panini Comics.
- Mills, Catriona (2021). "The Victorians Sleeping in Our Minds". In Harmes, Marcus K.; Orthia, Lindy (eds.). Doctor Who and Science: Essays on Ideas, Identities and Ideologies in the Series. Jefferson, North Carolina: McFarland & Company. pp. 157–172. ISBN 978-1-4766-8112-2.
- Muir, John Kenneth (1999). A Critical History of Doctor Who on Television. Jefferson, North Carolina: McFarland & Company. ISBN 978-0-7864-0442-1.
