= The Rescue (Doctor Who) =

011 – The Rescue
- Doctor Who serial
- The design of Koquillion was inspired by a close-up of a fly.

Cast
- Doctor: William Hartnell – First Doctor
- Companions: William Russell – Ian Chesterton; Jacqueline Hill – Barbara Wright; Maureen O'Brien – Vicki
- Others: Ray Barrett – Bennett / Koquillion (Note: Barrett was credited under the pseudonym "Sydney Wilson" for his role as Koquillion in the first episode.); Tom Sheridan – Space Captain / Sand Beast (Note: Sheridan was only credited as 'Space Captain'.); John Stuart, Colin Hughes – Didonians (uncredited)

Production
- Directed by: Christopher Barry
- Written by: David Whitaker
- Script editor: Dennis Spooner (uncredited)
- Produced by: Verity Lambert
- Music by: Tristram Cary (Note: Re-use of music from The Daleks)
- Production code: L
- Series: Season 2
- Running time: 2 episodes, 25 minutes each
- First broadcast: 2 January 1965
- Last broadcast: 9 January 1965

Chronology
← Preceded by The Dalek Invasion of Earth	Followed by → The Romans

The Rescue is the third serial of the second season of the British science fiction television series Doctor Who. Written by outgoing story editor David Whitaker and directed by Christopher Barry, the serial was broadcast on BBC1 in two weekly parts on 2 January and 9 January 1965. In the serial, the time travellers the First Doctor (William Hartnell), Ian Chesterton (William Russell), and Barbara Wright (Jacqueline Hill) befriend Vicki (Maureen O'Brien), an orphan girl marooned on the planet Dido who is being threatened by an apparent native of Dido called Koquillion (Ray Barrett) while awaiting rescue.

The Rescue was written as a short vehicle to introduce Vicki as the new companion, replacing the Doctor's granddaughter, Susan. Vicki underwent several name changes throughout production. The serial was produced in a six-episode block with the following, The Romans, and was the first story produced in Doctor Who's second production block. For the score, Barry reused the work of Tristram Cary from his previous serial, The Daleks. The Rescue maintained the high viewership of the previous serial, with 12 and 13 million viewers. Reviews were generally positive, with praise for the performances and dialogue, despite some criticism of the simple plot and obvious resolution. The serial was later novelised and released on VHS and DVD.

== Plot ==
The First Doctor (William Hartnell), Ian Chesterton (William Russell), and Barbara Wright (Jacqueline Hill) miss the Doctor's granddaughter Susan Foreman when the TARDIS lands on the planet Dido, a world the Doctor has visited before. The trio soon encounter two survivors of a space crash, Vicki (Maureen O'Brien) and Bennett (Ray Barrett), who are awaiting a rescue ship that is due to arrive in three days time. Vicki and Bennett live in fear of Koquillion (Barrett), a bipedal inhabitant of Dido, who is stalking the area. Koquillion encounters the time travellers and attacks, pushing Barbara over a cliff and temporarily trapping Ian and the Doctor. Vicki finds Barbara injured and rescues her from Koquillion, and they share reminiscences. Vicki's father was among those who died when the survivors of the crash, save Bennett and Vicki, were lured to their deaths by the natives of Dido. She is evidently very lonely, having befriended an indigenous Sand Beast (Tom Sheridan) for company. However, when Ian and the Doctor reach the ship, tempers are fraught because Barbara mistook the Sand Beast for a threat and killed it.

The Doctor enters Bennett's room, and finds things are not as they seem. The supposedly crippled Bennett is missing, and a tape recorder hides his absence. He finds a trap door in the floor of the cabin and follows it to a temple carved from rock where he unmasks Koquillion as Bennett. Bennett reveals he killed a crewmember on board the ship and was arrested, but the ship crashed before the crime could be radioed to Earth. It was he who killed the crash survivors and the natives of Dido to cover his crime. He has been using the Koquillion alias so that Vicki would back up his story, and had hoped the planet would be destroyed when his version of events was given. Just as Bennett is about to kill the Doctor, two surviving native Didonians arrive and force Bennett to his death over a ledge. They then stop the signal to prevent the Rescue Ship reaching their planet. With no living family and nothing left for her on Dido, Vicki is welcomed aboard the TARDIS.

== Production ==
=== Conception and writing ===
The Rescue was written as a short vehicle to introduce Vicki as the new companion, replacing the Doctor's granddaughter, Susan. Producer Verity Lambert had originally booked Pamela Franklin to portray Jenny (originally called Saida) in the previous serial, The Dalek Invasion of Earth, and continue as Susan's replacement; however, Lambert soon changed her mind, and outgoing script editor David Whitaker was commissioned to write a two-part serial to introduce Vicki. Whitaker was officially commissioned on 1 November 1964, the day after his script editor contract with the BBC had expired. The Rescue was the first story under new script editor Dennis Spooner, though he was not credited. Earlier names given to Vicki were Valerie, Lukki, and Millie; the latter was inspired by Millie Small, but the name was considered too similar to comedian Millicent Martin. The draft script for the serial was titled Doctor Who and Tanni, referring to another name considered for Vicki.

The Rescue used the same production team as the following serial, The Romans, and the two were formed to create a single six-episode production block. Christopher Barry was selected to direct the two serials; he was unimpressed with the scripts for The Rescue. With budgeting tight, Barry decided to reuse the score from his previous serial, The Daleks, composed by Tristram Cary. Cary was initially hesitant, having had negative experiences with the reuse of his music in the past. Music from the first, fourth, fifth, sixth, and seventh episodes of The Daleks were used in The Rescue; the sound of a Dalek death was reused for the death of Sandy the sand beast in the second episode.

=== Casting and characters ===
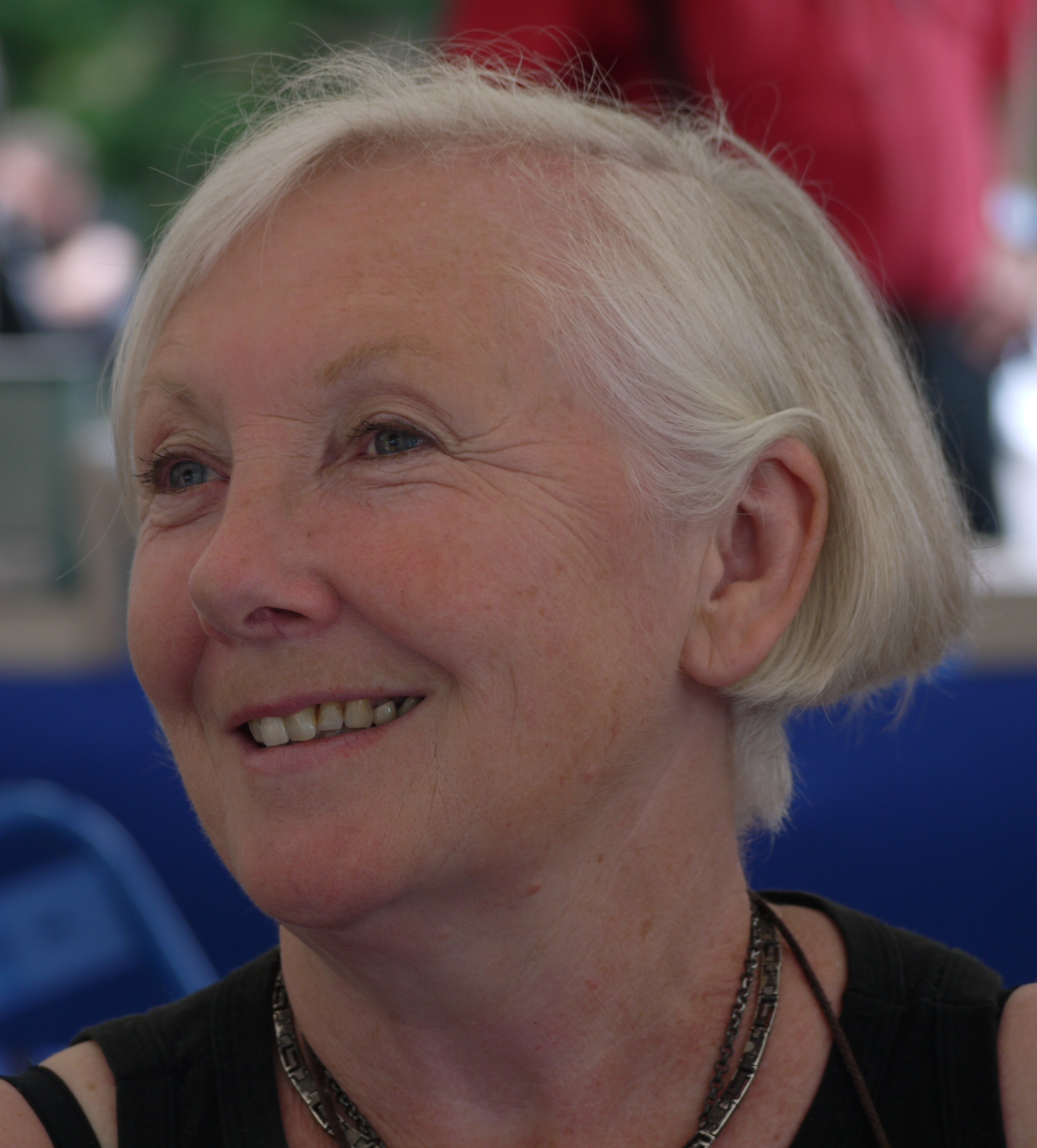
Maureen O'Brien (pictured in 2009) was introduced in The Rescue as new companion Vicki.

After the potential for Franklin's casting expired, Lambert requested camera tests for Maureen O'Brien and Denise Upson to portray Vicki; the two auditioned on 14 September 1964 at the BBC Television Centre, and O'Brien was eventually cast. When O'Brien met with the show's creator Sydney Newman, he told her that they were considering having her cut her hair and dye it black. O'Brien refused, saying, "Why don't you just get Carole Ann Ford back?" O'Brien had just come out of drama school when she was cast as Vicki; it was her first television acting job.

Barry originally offered the role of Bennett to Bernard Archard, but he was unavailable. Ray Barrett was cast in the role, described as a "Jekyll and Hyde character". Barry had seen Barrett on television and noted his name due to his rugged face, and "dug him out of the book" when the time came. Barrett played Bennett as a "normal, straight human being" so as not to give the ending away. To preserve the mystery, Koquillion was credited in the first episode as being played by "Sydney Wilson", a name made up by the production team in tribute to two of the creators of Doctor Who, Sydney Newman and Donald Wilson. When designing Koquillion, costume designer Daphne Dare took inspiration from a close-up of a fly. Tom Sheridan was cast to play the voice communicating from the rescue ship, the sand creature, and a Didonian. An agreement was made for Sheridan to be credited as 'Space Captain' only, and he ultimately did not portray a Didonian.

=== Filming ===
The Rescue was the first in a new production block of Doctor Who; the first production block had lasted for 52 weeks, with the final two stories—Planet of Giants and The Dalek Invasion of Earth—held back to open the second season. The regular cast took a six-week break before beginning production on The Rescue. Model filming for the serial began on 16 November 1964 at BBC Television Film Studios on Stage 2. The model spaceships were designed by Raymond Cusick—both in flight and wrecked—and created by Shawcraft Models in ten days. Cusick had found a cheap material he called "reeded hardboard", which was spray-painted silver and used for the outside of the craft prop. Model shots of the TARDIS falling off the mountain were filmed on 17 November.

Rehearsals for the first episode took place from 30 November to 3 December 1964 at the London Transport Assembly Rooms in Wood Green. O'Brien encountered difficulties learning her lines, and became worried when other cast members were able to rehearse without their scripts by the second day. Ford visited on O'Brien's first day to wish her luck. The first episode was recorded on 4 December at Riverside Studios; it overran by 15 minutes. There was a happy atmosphere among the cast, including a picnic in Hartnell's dressing room. After Barrett fell asleep in the studio, the cast and crew left and switched off the lights to make him believe that he had slept all night. Rehearsals for the second episode took place from 7–10 December, with recording on 11 December. In the scene where Barbara shoots the sand beast, the powder in the prop detonated prematurely, and Hill was treated for shock and a sore face. The Dido temple was a large set that was lit in such a way to create a dark atmosphere, using dark drapes and smoke.

== Reception ==
=== Broadcast and ratings ===
Episode	Title	Run time	Original release date	UK viewers (millions)	Appreciation Index
1	"The Powerful Enemy"	26:15	2 January 1965	12.0	57
2	"Desperate Measures"	24:36	9 January 1965	13.0	59

The Rescue was broadcast on BBC1 in two weekly parts on 2 January and 9 January 1965. It continued the high ratings of The Dalek Invasion of Earth, with 12 million viewers for the first episode. It was the eleventh most-watched programme of the week, and the top-rated BBC1 show in London and northern England. The second episode had higher ratings, with 13 million viewers, ranking it eighth for the week. The Appreciation Index rose from 57 to 59 across the two episodes. On 13 December 1966, a retention order was issued that included both episodes of The Rescue to be retained by the BBC. However, both episodes were wiped: the first on 17 August 1967 and the second on 31 January 1969. BBC Enterprises had retained telerecordings of both episodes and returned them to the BBC in 1978.

=== Critical response ===
After the first episode's broadcast, T.C. Worsley of the Financial Times felt that the Koquillion was lacking compared to the Daleks, but appreciated its name. At the BBC's Programme Review Board after the second episode, Sydney Newman said that O'Brien had "made a great impact" on the show, noting that her performance had improved others.

Retrospective reviews were generally positive. In The Discontinuity Guide (1995), Paul Cornell, Martin Day, and Keith Topping wrote that the serial "just about works" as an introduction to Vicki, "but it's too inconsequential to sustain any real interest". In The Television Companion (1998), David J. Howe and Stephen James Walker described the story as "one of the best examples of character-driven drama from this period of the series' history", praising the character of Vicki, though noting that some parts of the plot remained unexplained. In A Critical History of Doctor Who (1999), John Kenneth Muir lauded O'Brien's performance despite Vicki being "a fairly obvious Susan surrogate", and enjoyed the emotional scenes and climax.

In 2008, Patrick Mulkern of Radio Times described the serial as a "neglected gem" with a strong debut for Vicki and many production improvements, though noted that the mystery was "a tad obvious". In 2009, DVD Talk's Stuart Galbraith IV felt that the story was strong with a "smart, if somewhat predictable climax and resolution" that worked due to the dialogue. Cliff Chapman of Den of Geek found the serial "charming" and praised the performances, writing that the serial was only let down by its "weak and convenient resolution". Dreamwatch appreciated the pacing but felt that the story was lacking in comparison to The Romans.

== Commercial releases ==
The Rescue
- Author: Ian Marter
- Cover artist: Tony Clark
- Series: Doctor Who book: Target novelisations
- Release number: 124
- Publisher: Target Books
- Publication date: August 1987
- ISBN: 0-491-03317-6

Ian Marter began adapting the script from The Rescue into a novelisation, but died near completion; Nigel Robinson completed the manuscript. Robinson recalled having to make very few changes to Marter's work, but noted that he cut an entire scene from the first chapter discussing fellatio, as Marter "did have a tendency to see how much he could get away with". The novelisation was published in August 1987 in paperback by Target Books and in hardback by W. H. Allen. The cover was designed by Tony Clark. An audiobook version of the novelisation was published by AudioGO on 1 April 2013, read by O'Brien.

The Rescue was released on VHS as a double-pack with The Romans by BBC Video in September 1994, with the cover designed by Andrew Skilleter. It was released on DVD in a slipcase with The Romans on 23 February 2009; the Region 1 release followed on 7 July 2009. The serial was released on Blu-ray on 5 December 2022, alongside the rest of the second season as part of The Collection, and was added to BBC iPlayer on 1 November 2023 alongside most other serials. Its audio was released as a vinyl record for Record Store Day on 18 April 2026.

== Bibliography ==
- Cornell, Paul; Day, Martin; Topping, Keith (1995). "The Dalek Invasion of Earth". The Discontinuity Guide. London: Virgin Books. ISBN 0-426-20442-5.
- Howe, David J.; Walker, Stephen James (1998). Doctor Who: The Television Companion: Volume 1 (2021 ed.). London: BBC Books. ISBN 978-1-845-83156-1.
- Muir, John Kenneth (1999). A Critical History of Doctor Who on Television. Jefferson, North Carolina: McFarland & Company. ISBN 978-0-786-40442-1.
- Robinson, David; Prekodravac, Richard, eds. (1995). "Interview with Nigel Robinson" (PDF). Broadsword (5): 7–8, 13. Archived (PDF) from the original on 6 May 2016.
- Wright, Mark, ed. (2017). "The Dalek Invasion of Earth, The Rescue, The Romans and The Web Planet". Doctor Who: The Complete History. 4 (61). London: Panini Comics, Hachette Partworks. ISSN 2057-6048.
