= Doctor Who season 2 =

Doctor Who season 2 may refer to three different seasons of the British science fiction television programme Doctor Who:

- Doctor Who season 2, the 1964–1965 season featuring the First Doctor (William Hartnell)
- Doctor Who series 2, the 2006 series continuation featuring the Tenth Doctor (David Tennant)
- Doctor Who series 15, the 2025 series known as "Season Two" featuring the Fifteenth Doctor (Ncuti Gatwa)
