= Doctor Who season 2 (1964–1965) =

1964–1965 season of British TV series

Doctor Who
- Season 2
- Cover art of the Blu-ray release for the complete season
- Starring: William Hartnell; William Russell; Jacqueline Hill; Carole Ann Ford; Maureen O'Brien; Peter Purves
- No. of stories: 9
- No. of episodes: 39 (2 missing)

Release
- Original network: BBC1
- Original release: 31 October 1964 – 24 July 1965

Season chronology
- ← Previous; Season 1 Next → Season 3

The second season of the British science fiction television series Doctor Who was originally broadcast on BBC1 between 1964 and 1965. The season began on 31 October 1964 with Planet of Giants and ended with The Time Meddler on 24 July 1965. Like the first season, production was overseen by the BBC's first female producer Verity Lambert. Story editor David Whitaker continued to handle the scripts and stories during early production, handing over to Dennis Spooner as the season began to air; Spooner subsequently left his role by the season's end, and was replaced by Donald Tosh for its final serial. By the season's end, Lambert was the only remaining production member from the team responsible for creating the series.

The season continued to star William Hartnell as the first incarnation of the Doctor, an alien who travels through time and space in his TARDIS, which appears to be a British police box on the outside. Carole Ann Ford continued her role as the Doctor's granddaughter Susan Foreman, who acts as his companion alongside her schoolteachers Ian Chesterton and Barbara Wright, portrayed by William Russell and Jacqueline Hill, respectively. Ford departed the series at the conclusion of the season's second serial, The Dalek Invasion of Earth, replaced by Maureen O'Brien as Vicki in the following story, The Rescue. Towards the end of the season, Russell and Hill also depart in the final episode of The Chase, replaced by Peter Purves as Steven Taylor. Hartnell remained as the only original cast member.

The nine serials were written by six writers: Whitaker, Spooner, Louis Marks, Terry Nation, Bill Strutton, and Glyn Jones. Lambert worked with the story editors to keep the show feeling fresh, attempting new avenues such as humorous and pseudo-historical content. The serials were mostly directed by returning directors Mervyn Pinfield, Richard Martin, Christopher Barry; the exception is Douglas Camfield, who had worked as a production assistant to director Waris Hussein during the first season. The first two serials were filmed from August to October 1964 within the same production block as the first season; the remainder of the season began filming in December 1964 and lasted for approximately seven months, with weekly recording taking place mostly at Riverside Studios or the BBC Television Centre.

The first episode was watched by 8.4 million viewers, considered a strong debut to the season. The Dalek Invasion of Earth was watched by an additional four million viewers, and the show reached a series-high of 13.5 million viewers for the first episode of The Web Planet. The season received generally positive reviews, with praise directed at the scripts and performances, particularly Hartnell and Hill, though some stories and special effects were criticised; the final scenes of Ford, Russell, and Hill received particular praise for their emotional impact. Several episodes were erased by the BBC between 1967 and 1969, though most were eventually discovered and recovered; of a total of 39 episodes, only two episodes of The Crusade remain missing. The serials received several VHS and DVD releases as well as tie-in novels, and a Blu-ray set for the season was released in 2022.

== Cast and characters ==
- William Hartnell as the First Doctor, the original incarnation of the Doctor, a Time Lord who travels the universe in a time travelling spaceship called the TARDIS with companions. Initially irascible and prickly, the Doctor has warmed up to his companions. He is eccentric and occasionally aloof, dressing in an Edwardian-style costume, and possesses an academic interest in human history and an aversion to violence.
- William Russell as Ian Chesterton, a science teacher at Coal Hill School. He is practical and action-orientated, performing physical tasks in place of the Doctor. Ian is strong-willed, often acting angrily or feigning violence to instil his liberal worldview in others. He is loyal and honest, frequently standing up to the Doctor whenever he disagrees. As he continues travelling, Ian wants to return to his home in 1960s London.
- Jacqueline Hill as Barbara Wright, a history teacher at Coal Hill School. She is sensible, practical, and opinionated, and her insightful historical knowledge proves useful when travelling to the past. Her assertiveness and ethics often clash with the Doctor's authority and short-sightedness.
- Carole Ann Ford as Susan Foreman, the Doctor's teenage granddaughter and his original companion. She is often immature and frequently expresses fear and panic at stressful situations, but occasionally displays her otherworldliness. By the time of her departure, Susan's immaturity develops into self-discovery before finding a home.
- Maureen O'Brien as Vicki, a teenager from the planet Dido in the 25th century. The Doctor asks her to travel with him, and the two quickly become close. Though initially a scientific genius, she is similar in attitude to Susan but more childlike and naïve, making childish comments that the others dismiss.
- Peter Purves as Steven Taylor, an astronaut shipwrecked on Mechanus who escapes on the TARDIS. He is courageous and headstrong, outwardly acting like an action hero but possessing chivalrous gallantry.

== Serials ==
No. story	No. in season	Serial title	Episode titles	Directed by	Written by	Original release date	Prod. code	UK viewers (millions)	AI
9	1	Planet of Giants	"Planet of Giants"	Mervyn Pinfield	Louis Marks	31 October 1964	J	8.4	57
9	1	Planet of Giants	"Dangerous Journey"	Mervyn Pinfield	Louis Marks	7 November 1964	J	8.4	58
9	1	Planet of Giants	"Crisis"	Douglas Camfield	Louis Marks	14 November 1964	J	8.9	59
Arriving on Earth, the First Doctor, Ian, Barbara, and Susan have been shrunk to the height of an inch. A government scientist called Farrow visits a callous industrialist named Forester to tell him that his application for a new insecticide called DN6 has been rejected as it is too deadly; news of this appraisal prompts Forester to fatally shoot Farrow. Forester alters Farrow's report to give support to the DN6 licence application and makes a supportive phone call to the ministry to the same effect. This is overheard by the local telephone operator and her policeman husband Bert. Bert heads off to the house to investigate. Forester's aide discovers the true virulence of DN6 and demands Forester cease his licence application. In the lab, the makeshift bomb explodes in Forester's face as Bert arrives. Back in the TARDIS, the Doctor succeeds in returning the craft and crew to normal size.
10	2	The Dalek Invasion of Earth	"World's End"	Richard Martin	Terry Nation	21 November 1964	K	11.4	63
10	2	The Dalek Invasion of Earth	"The Daleks"	Richard Martin	Terry Nation	28 November 1964	K	12.4	59
10	2	The Dalek Invasion of Earth	"Day of Reckoning"	Richard Martin	Terry Nation	5 December 1964	K	11.9	59
10	2	The Dalek Invasion of Earth	"The End of Tomorrow"	Richard Martin	Terry Nation	12 December 1964	K	11.9	59
10	2	The Dalek Invasion of Earth	"The Waking Ally"	Richard Martin	Terry Nation	19 December 1964	K	11.4	58
10	2	The Dalek Invasion of Earth	"Flashpoint"	Richard Martin	Terry Nation	26 December 1964	K	12.4	63
The Daleks have invaded Earth following a plague and meteorite strike. Resistance fighter David rescues the Doctor with Susan while Barbara gets separated. Ian hides in a mine and becomes trapped in a capsule filled with explosives. The Doctor, Susan, and David arrive at the cliffs overlooking the mine; the Doctor sends David and Susan to interfere with the Daleks' radio signals, while he climbs into the mine. Barbara and resistance fighter Jenny are brought before the Black Dalek and discover that the Daleks are drilling through the Earth's crust to blow out its core. The Daleks imprison Barbara and Jenny and set the explosive-filled capsule in position, but Ian disarms it. The Doctor frees Barbara and Jenny. With the radio signals damaged, Barbara and the Doctor order the Robomen to destroy the Daleks, and the human slaves rebel. The bomb destroys the Dalek fleet. Back in London, the Doctor locks the TARDIS doors to shut Susan out and bids her an emotional farewell.
11	3	The Rescue	"The Powerful Enemy"	Christopher Barry	David Whitaker	2 January 1965	L	12.0	57
11	3	The Rescue	"Desperate Measures"	Christopher Barry	David Whitaker	9 January 1965	L	13.0	59
On the planet Dido, the Doctor, Ian, and Barbara encounter Vicki and Bennett, two survivors of a space crash who are awaiting a rescue ship. They live in fear of Koquillion, a bipedal inhabitant who is stalking the area. The Doctor enters Bennett's room, and follows a trap door to a temple where he unmasks Koquillion as Bennett. Bennett reveals he killed a crewmember on board the ship and was arrested, but the ship crashed before the crime could be transmitted to Earth. He has been using the Koquillion alias so that Vicki would back up his story, and had hoped the planet would be destroyed when his version of events was given. Just as Bennett is about to kill the Doctor, two surviving native Didonians arrive and force Bennett to his death over a ledge. With no living family and nothing left for her on Dido, Vicki is welcomed aboard the TARDIS.
12	4	The Romans	"The Slave Traders"	Christopher Barry	Dennis Spooner	16 January 1965	M	13.0	53
12	4	The Romans	"All Roads Lead to Rome"	Christopher Barry	Dennis Spooner	23 January 1965	M	11.5	51
12	4	The Romans	"Conspiracy"	Christopher Barry	Dennis Spooner	30 January 1965	M	10.0	50
12	4	The Romans	"Inferno"	Christopher Barry	Dennis Spooner	6 February 1965	M	12.0	50
While enjoying a holiday at a Roman villa in the year 64 AD, the Doctor and Vicki decide to visit the city of Rome. Meanwhile, Ian and Barbara are kidnapped; Barbara is sold as handmaiden to Nero's wife Poppaea Sabina, while Ian is confined to a galley on the Mediterranean. The Doctor is mistaken for a dead lyre player and decides to assume his identity. Ian is washed ashore and heads to Rome in search of Barbara, only to be captured and taken to be trained as a gladiator. Nero organises a banquet in the Doctor's honour, but when he is angered, he decides to have the Doctor fed to the lions. At the arena, Ian fights his way out, attempting to reunite with Barbara. Nero calls off his soldiers, planning to have Ian killed when he returns to rescue Barbara. The Doctor realises that Nero is planning to destroy the city. The Doctor accidentally sets fire to Nero's plans, which gives him the idea for the Great Fire of Rome; he spares the Doctor's life. Ian and Barbara are reunited as the Doctor and Vicki watch the city burn from a nearby hill.
13	5	The Web Planet	"The Web Planet"	Richard Martin	Bill Strutton	13 February 1965	N	13.5	56
13	5	The Web Planet	"The Zarbi"	Richard Martin	Bill Strutton	20 February 1965	N	12.5	53
13	5	The Web Planet	"Escape to Danger"	Richard Martin	Bill Strutton	27 February 1965	N	12.5	53
13	5	The Web Planet	"Crater of Needles"	Richard Martin	Bill Strutton	6 March 1965	N	13.0	49
13	5	The Web Planet	"Invasion"	Richard Martin	Bill Strutton	13 March 1965	N	12.0	48
13	5	The Web Planet	"The Centre"	Richard Martin	Bill Strutton	20 March 1965	N	11.5	42
On the planet Vortis, the Doctor, Ian, Barbara, and Vicki ally with the Menoptra to battle the Zarbi. Barbara is captured by the Zarbi who use her to find the Menoptra. The Zarbi take the Doctor and Ian to the Carsinome where they find Vicki. The Animus forces the Doctor to help track down the Menoptra invasion force. Ian meets a Menoptra called Vrestin, and learns that the Animus has taken control of the planet. The Doctor accidentally reveals the Menoptra spearhead plan to land near the Crater of Needles, giving the Animus the opportunity to ambush them. Ian and Vrestin meet the Optera, descendants of the Menoptra who fled underground, and convince them to help fight the Animus. The Doctor and Vicki are taken by the Zarbi to the Animus. Barbara, Ian, the Menoptra, and the Optera defeat the Animus. The Zarbi return to their docile state.
14	6	The Crusade	"The Lion"	Douglas Camfield	David Whitaker	27 March 1965	P	10.5	51
14	6	The Crusade	"The Knight of Jaffa"^{†}	Douglas Camfield	David Whitaker	3 April 1965	P	8.5	50
14	6	The Crusade	"The Wheel of Fortune"	Douglas Camfield	David Whitaker	10 April 1965	P	9.0	49
14	6	The Crusade	"The Warlords"^{†}	Douglas Camfield	David Whitaker	17 April 1965	P	9.5	48
The TARDIS materialises in 12th century Palestine, during the time of the Third Crusade. When the Doctor, Ian, Barbara, and Vicki emerge, they find themselves in the middle of a Saracen ambush. Barbara is seized by a Saracen while the Doctor, Ian, and Vicki stop the attackers from killing William de Tornebu, an associate of Richard the Lionheart. Barbara and William des Preaux are presented to Saladin's brother Saphadin by El Akir, who mistakenly believes them to be King Richard and his sister Lady Joanna. Des Preaux reveals their true identities, but Saladin is intrigued by Barbara and invites her to entertain him with her stories. De Tornebu and the Doctor are able to convince the King to help save Barbara. Ian delivers a message to Saladin, after which Saladin grants Ian leave to search for Barbara. Ian is attacked by bandits, but eventually escapes. Barbara twice escapes from El Akir's capture, and a man saves her by fatally stabbing him. Barbara and Ian are reunited and head for the TARDIS, where they meet the Doctor and Vicki and escape.
15	7	The Space Museum	"The Space Museum"	Mervyn Pinfield	Glyn Jones	24 April 1965	Q	10.5	61
15	7	The Space Museum	"The Dimensions of Time"	Mervyn Pinfield	Glyn Jones	1 May 1965	Q	9.2	53
15	7	The Space Museum	"The Search"	Mervyn Pinfield	Glyn Jones	8 May 1965	Q	8.5	56
15	7	The Space Museum	"The Final Phase"	Mervyn Pinfield	Glyn Jones	15 May 1965	Q	8.5	49
In a space museum on the planet Xeros, the Doctor, Ian, Barbara, and Vicki find themselves encased and on display. A few moments later, the time track slips back and the exhibit with themselves and the TARDIS vanish, but the travellers are still inside the Museum. The head of the Moroks, Lobos, reflects sourly that the Morok Empire has become decadent and declined. The Moroks find the TARDIS and start tracking down the occupants. Vicki has made contact with the Xerons and, hearing of their enslavement, aids them in their plans to stage a revolution. They attack the Morok armoury and Vicki outwits its controlling computer. With their new weapons, the Xerons are able to begin a revolution. Ian has meanwhile freed the Doctor from Lobos, who had begun the process of freezing him and turning him into an exhibit. Ian and the Doctor are quickly recaptured by the Morok guards, and Barbara and Vicki are captured shortly thereafter. Help comes from the Xeron revolutionaries, who kill Lobos and the other Morok captors. The Xerons destroy the Museum.
16	8	The Chase	"The Executioners"	Richard Martin (Note: For the sixth episode, Douglas Camfield directed the still photography shoot as part of the pre-filming work for the following serial, The Time Meddler.)	Terry Nation	22 May 1965	R	10.0	57
16	8	The Chase	"The Death of Time"	Richard Martin	Terry Nation	29 May 1965	R	9.5	56
16	8	The Chase	"Flight Through Eternity"	Richard Martin	Terry Nation	5 June 1965	R	9.0	55
16	8	The Chase	"Journey into Terror"	Richard Martin	Terry Nation	12 June 1965	R	9.5	54
16	8	The Chase	"The Death of Doctor Who"	Richard Martin	Terry Nation	19 June 1965	R	9.0	56
16	8	The Chase	"The Planet of Decision"	Richard Martin	Terry Nation	26 June 1965	R	9.5	57
Using a time machine, the Daleks pursue the TARDIS through time and space in order to exterminate its crew. They narrowly miss the TARDIS crew on the planet Aridius, atop the Empire State Building in 1966, on the Mary Celeste, and in a futuristic theme park attraction featuring Dracula and Frankenstein's monster. The Daleks create an android replica of the Doctor programmed to kill the TARDIS crew, dispatched on arrival on the jungle world of Mechanus. A fight ensues between Ian and the real Doctor once the robot duplicate appears, claiming to be the original; Barbara realises which is the android, and the real Doctor disables his doppelgänger. Mechonoids imprison the Doctor and his companion with shipwrecked human astronaut Steven Taylor. Under the cover of the Daleks attack on the city, the Doctor and his companions escape. Ian and Barbara convince the Doctor to use the Dalek time machine to return them to London in their own time.
17	9	The Time Meddler	"The Watcher"	Douglas Camfield	Dennis Spooner	3 July 1965	S	8.9	57
17	9	The Time Meddler	"The Meddling Monk"	Douglas Camfield	Dennis Spooner	10 July 1965	S	8.8	49
17	9	The Time Meddler	"A Battle of Wits"	Douglas Camfield	Dennis Spooner	17 July 1965	S	7.7	53
17	9	The Time Meddler	"Checkmate"	Douglas Camfield	Dennis Spooner	24 July 1965	S	8.3	54
The Doctor and Vicki find Steven aboard the TARDIS. They arrive in Northumbria in 1066. The Doctor travels to a monastery and finds a gramophone, but is soon trapped by the Monk. Steven and Vicki discover the Monk's TARDIS and determine that he must originate from the same place as the Doctor. The Doctor eventually escapes and gains the upper hand against the Monk, who reveals his plan to destroy the Viking fleet, preventing the Battle of Stamford Bridge and leave the Saxon soldiers completely fresh to defeat William of Normandy at the Battle of Hastings. He boasts that his plan would accelerate mankind's development by centuries. The Doctor denounces the Monk for seeking to alter the course of history and forces him to reveal his TARDIS, where they find Steven and Vicki. The Doctor takes the dimensional control of the Monk's TARDIS, leaving the interior shrunk beyond use and the Monk stranded in 1066.

^† Episode is missing

== Production ==
=== Development ===
BBC Head of Drama and Doctor Who co-creator Sydney Newman sent a memo to Chief of Programmes Donald Baverstock on 20 May 1964 proposing a six-week broadcast break after the conclusion of the show's seventh serial, The Sensorites in August 1964; Baverstock subsequently approved a four-week break after the eighth serial, The Reign of Terror in September. This break meant that the final two serials of the show's first 52-week production block—Planet of Giants and The Dalek Invasion of Earth—were held back until the beginning of the second season. The four-week break subsequently became six weeks, with the premiere on 31 October 1964. In August 1964, producer Verity Lambert attempted to gain a final answer on whether the show would be renewed for a second production block. On 14 August, Baverstock agreed to 13 weeks, with the possibility of an additional 13; on 21 August, he agreed to a full 26 weeks, and in January 1965, he extended it to 35 weeks, with four more episodes added to the second season and the final five held back for the following season. During the production of The Dalek Invasion of Earth—the end of the first production block—associate producer Mervyn Pinfield departed the programme; he continued to be credited until the end of the season's fourth serial. Pinfield's role was not replaced, as Lambert had settled into her position and no longer required an assistant. By the season's end, Lambert was the only remaining production member from the team responsible for creating the series.

=== Casting ===
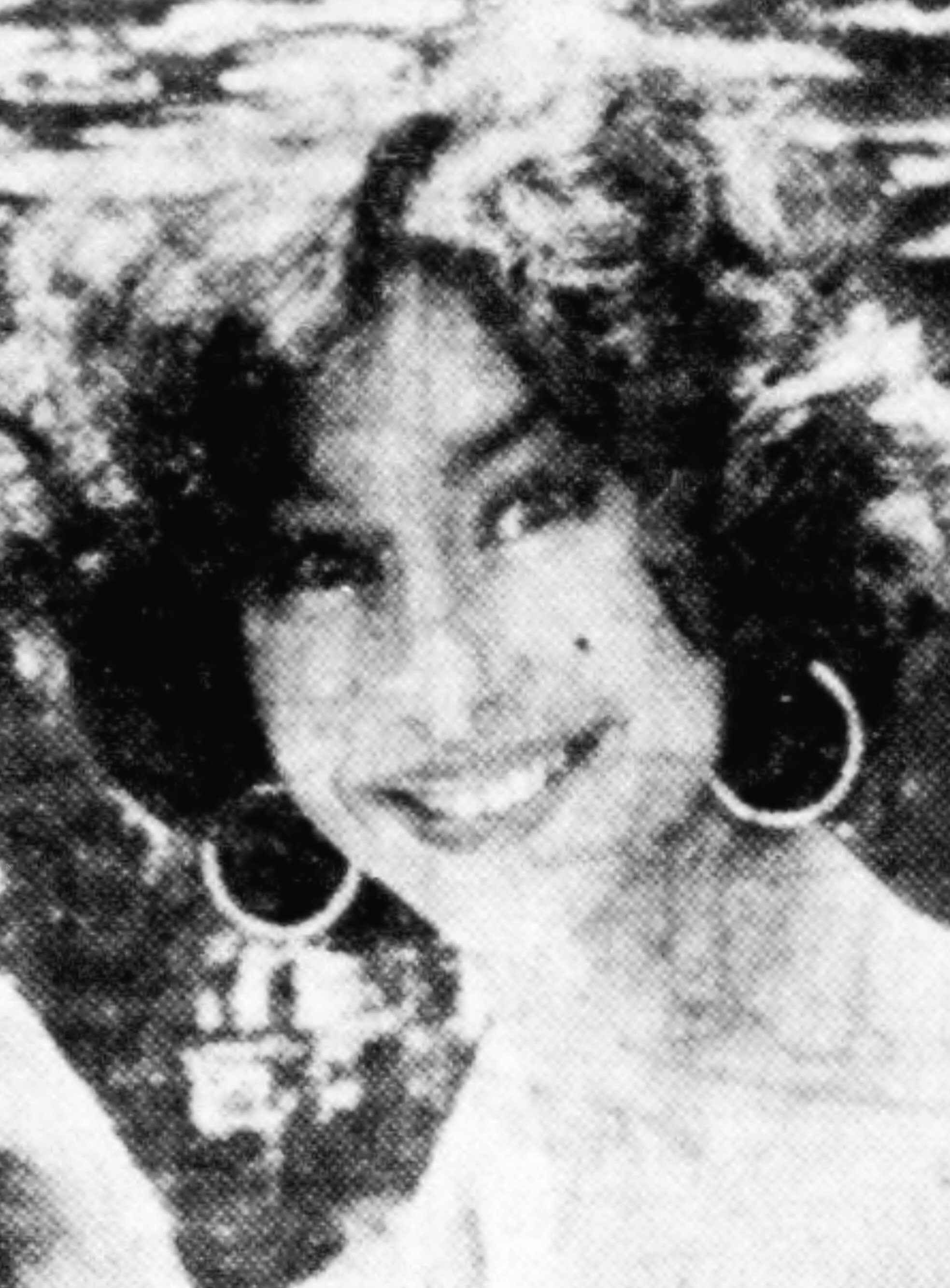
Carole Ann Ford

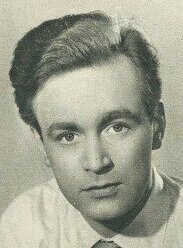
William Russell

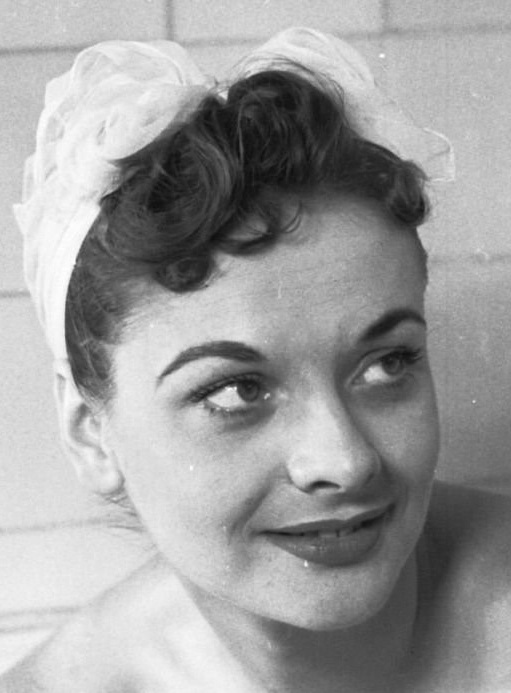
Jacqueline Hill

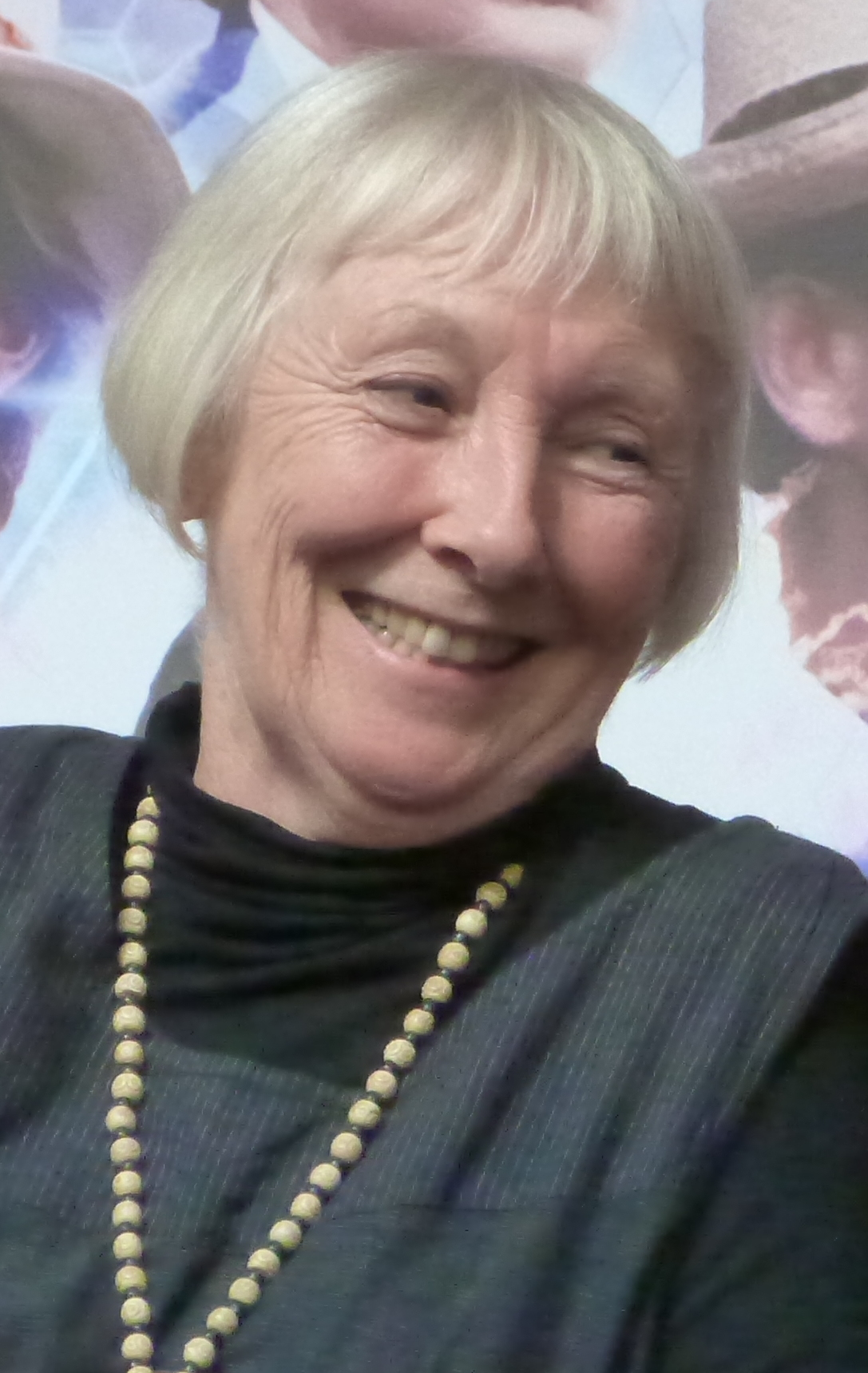
Maureen O'Brien

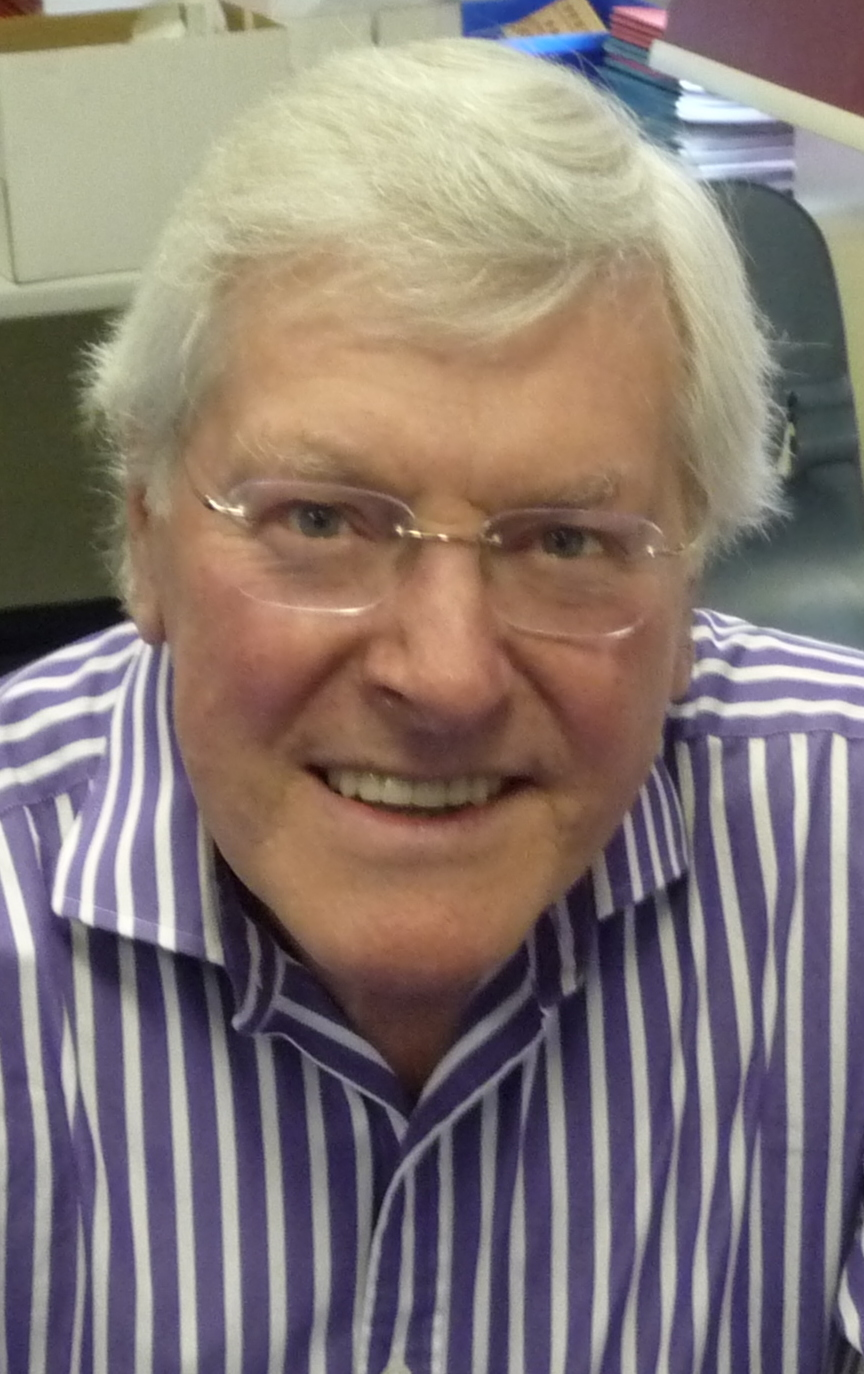
Peter Purves

The second season saw the departures of Ford, Russell, and Hill as Susan, Ian, and Barbara, and the introductions of O'Brien and Purves as Vicki and Steven, respectively.

On 12 March 1964, trade paper Television Today announced that Carole Ann Ford would depart from her role as Susan Foreman at the end of her contract—the end of the first production block, at the conclusion of The Dalek Invasion of Earth—due to her dissatisfaction with the character's development. Story editor David Whitaker wanted a strong reason for Susan's departure. In June 1964, head of serials Donald Wilson considered continuing the show without the character of Barbara Wright, and with a younger actress for Susan. In August 1964, Lambert cast Pamela Franklin as Jenny (originally known as Saida) in The Dalek Invasion of Earth to replace Ford as Susan; some days later, the character was rewritten to become a more minor role, with the new companion to be introduced in the following serial. Franklin was no longer in the running for the role. Director Richard Martin had asked Ann Davies, who was eventually cast as Jenny, if she would be available as a regular cast member, but he could not offer the role. Lambert requested camera tests for Maureen O'Brien and Denise Upson to portray Vicki, the new companion; the two auditioned on 14 September 1964 at the BBC Television Centre, and O'Brien was eventually cast. O'Brien had just come out of drama school when she was cast as Vicki; it was her first television acting job.

On 14 August 1964, Baverstock asked Lambert to renew the contracts of William Hartnell, William Russell, and Jacqueline Hill—for their roles as the Doctor, Ian Chesterton, and Barbara Wright, respectively—for an additional 13 weeks. By 19 August, Lambert noted the responses: Hartnell turned down the offer, wanting 26 weeks and 250 guineas per episode (an increase of 25); Russell would accept upon his fee being raised to meet Hartnell's (a raise of approximately 75 guineas); and Hill would accept at a salary of 200 guineas (an increase of 95). Baverstock recommended that Lambert caution the three actors regarding their requests, but soon withdrew himself from the discussions, asking Lambert to consult with head of series Elwyn Jones instead. Lambert said that she would be willing to accept Hartnell's request if the show was renewed for 26 weeks instead of 13, but noted that Russell and Hill could only be offered a raise of between £10 and £25 (equivalent to £177 and £443 in 2025) per episode each.

The season's penultimate serial, The Chase, marks the final regular appearance of Russell and Hill. Their departure was announced on 1 April 1965; Russell explained that the creativity had gone and he wanted to reenter comedy and theatre performances, and Hill said that "It has been great fun, but you can't go on forever". They made their decisions independently, and gave extended notice to Lambert. Hartnell was greatly upset by their decision, becoming the sole original actor remaining on the series, and both he and Lambert tried to persuade them to stay. Lambert eventually decided that Ian and Barbara would depart simultaneously, in a mildly romantic manner. Peter Purves was cast as new companion Steven Taylor, having impressed Hartnell and O'Brien in a different role earlier in the serial; Martin was hesitant to cast Purves in two roles within the same serial, but Lambert approved. Purves accepted the role within days. Though generally unfamiliar with science fiction, he recalled being impressed by the show's first serial, An Unearthly Child (1963), and had enjoyed working with Hartnell and O'Brien; he had met Hartnell a few weeks prior while shooting The World of Wooster (1965–1967) at Ealing Studios. On 21 May 1965, Purves was contracted for three stories (13 episodes), with an option for a further 20 episodes by 10 September and another 26 by 4 February 1966. His role as a companion on the show was announced on 18 June 1965.

=== Writing ===
In April 1964, Whitaker suggested to Lambert that the show's second season should employ fewer writers for better character development. He set out a plan of ten serials between four and six episodes (52 in total), alternating between the three story types originally envisioned for the show: history of the past, technology in the future, and alternatives of the present. He suggested that the four historical stories focus on the Spanish Armada, Ancient Egyptians, American Civil War, and Ancient Romans, while two of the five futuristic serials could include stories already written by Malcolm Hulke and Anthony Coburn. He also recommended that Terry Nation should be made senior writer, at least for the futuristic serials, alongside a senior writer for the historical stories. Some of the writers under consideration for the second season by late October 1964 included Keith Dewhurst, William Emms, Brian Hayles, John Lucarotti, Alex Miller, and Hugh Whitemore; Whitaker contacted John Wyndham to write for the show, but he declined due to his ongoing book work. By January 1965, the story order and writers had been mostly finalised, with only the final serial omitted. Lambert worked with the story editors to keep the show feeling fresh, attempting new avenues such as the overt humour of The Romans and The Chase, the "downright weirdness" of The Web Planet, and the pseudo-historical content of The Time Meddler.

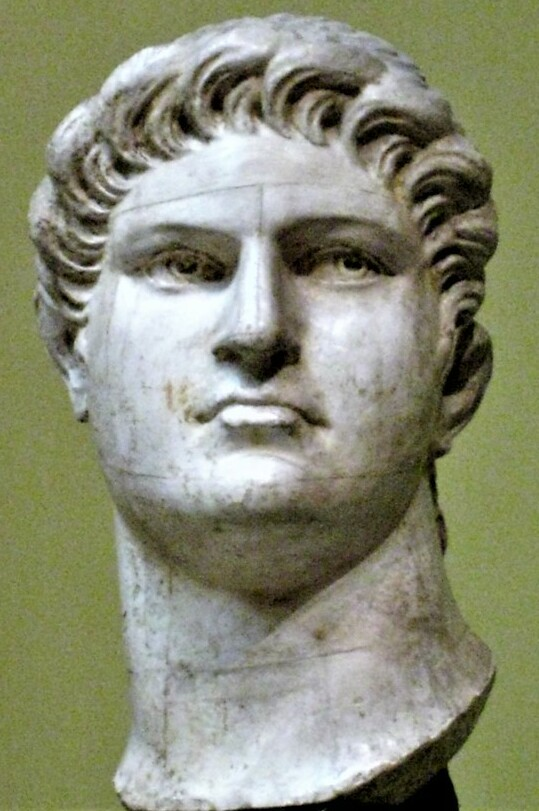
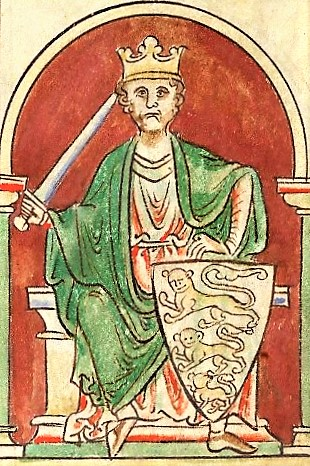
The second season's stories continued to feature historical figures such as Nero (left) and Richard I (right).

The concept for the second season's first serial Planet of Giants was initially proposed as the first story of the show's first season, written by C. E. Webber and entitled The Giants. After some rewrites, the serial was rejected by show creator Newman in June 1963 due to its technical complexity and lack of character development. The concept of The Giants was given to writer Robert Gould in mid-1963 to develop as the four-part fourth serial of the first season, but it was dropped by January 1964 due to scripting difficulties. By February 1964, the serial was assigned to writer Louis Marks. The main narrative was inspired by Rachel Carson's 1962 environmental science book Silent Spring, the first major documentation on human impact on the environment. In March 1964, Whitaker formally commissioned Terry Nation to write the second serial following the success of the Daleks from the titular serial of the first season, as well as Nation's quick work on The Keys of Marinus. Nation delivered the storyline for the serial in mid-April 1964 under the name The Return of the Daleks. The serial was retitled The Dalek Invasion of Earth by September.

By late August 1964, Whitaker began looking for stories for Doctor Who's second production block, set to begin with The Rescue; by late September, he began officially commissioning scripts. He rejected at least two proposals: The Hidden Planet by Malcolm Hulke due to necessary rewrites after Susan's departure, and a lack of science-fiction monsters; and The Slide by Victor Pemberton as he felt it was a messy blend of the show's science fiction stories to date and disliked the dialogue. Whitaker departed his position as story editor on 31 October 1964, replaced by Dennis Spooner, who had begun training with Whitaker on 6 August. The day after his contract expired, Whitaker was commissioned to write The Rescue and The Crusade, the former as a two-part short vehicle to introduce Vicki as the new companion. The Rescue used the same production team as the following serial, The Romans, and the two were formed to create a single six-episode production block. Spooner was commissioned to write The Romans, envisioned as the first Doctor Who serial with a humorous tone, which Lambert had been interested in attempting; according to William Russell, Lambert recognised Spooner's sense of humour and asked him to incorporate comedy into the script.

After watching Doctor Who, Australian writer Bill Strutton instructed his agents to contact the production team to discuss a story idea. He recalled a memory as a toddler, watching two bull ants fighting inside an empty kerosene can; he linked this memory with his two sons, aged six and four, fighting each other. He discussed the idea with Lambert, and Whitaker officially commissioned the story, The Web Planet, on 28 September 1964. Strutton wrote the scripts while in the process of relocating homes; his wife Marguerite created the name of the Zarbi. Spooner made edits to the script towards the end of 1964; he found the narrative to be multilayered, with the Menoptra representing free enterprise and the Zarbi communism. For The Crusade—intended to balance the show's science fiction stories—Whitaker was inspired by the Third Crusade; he found that some of the historical figures—namely King Richard and his sister Joan, whose affectionate relationship he considered "almost incestuous in its intensity"—were effective material for a character drama. Depictions of the sexual relationship between the siblings were cut from the script, partly as Hartnell found it unsuitable for the family show. The timing of some events were rearranged for dramatic purposes.

Around early October 1964, Whitaker asked South African writer Glyn Jones to develop a story for Doctor Who; after Whitaker left the role, Spooner asked Jones to develop a four-part serial, titled The Space Museum. Spooner edited out much of the humour from the original script, which Jones was unhappy with; Spooner felt that the serial was more intellectual. Following the success of the first two Dalek stories, Spooner quickly commissioned Nation to write a third serial. Nation's original story pitch was scrapped and he was instead commissioned to write a six-episode Dalek serial, The Chase. Nation's scripts required little editing from Spooner, though he was too busy to undertake rewrites. In March 1965, Lambert commissioned Spooner to write The Time Meddler to introduce new companion Steven Taylor; as story editors commissioning themselves was discouraged, Lambert justified his involvement to her superiors, citing the insufficient time required to brief an uninvolved writer, as none of the regular writers were available. Spooner wanted the show to move away from "pure" historical stories like The Reign of Terror and The Romans, instead hoping to blend them with the show's more futuristic serials. By April 1965, Spooner had decided to leave his role as story editor; he was replaced by Donald Tosh, who edited little of Spooner's work on The Time Meddler.

=== Filming ===
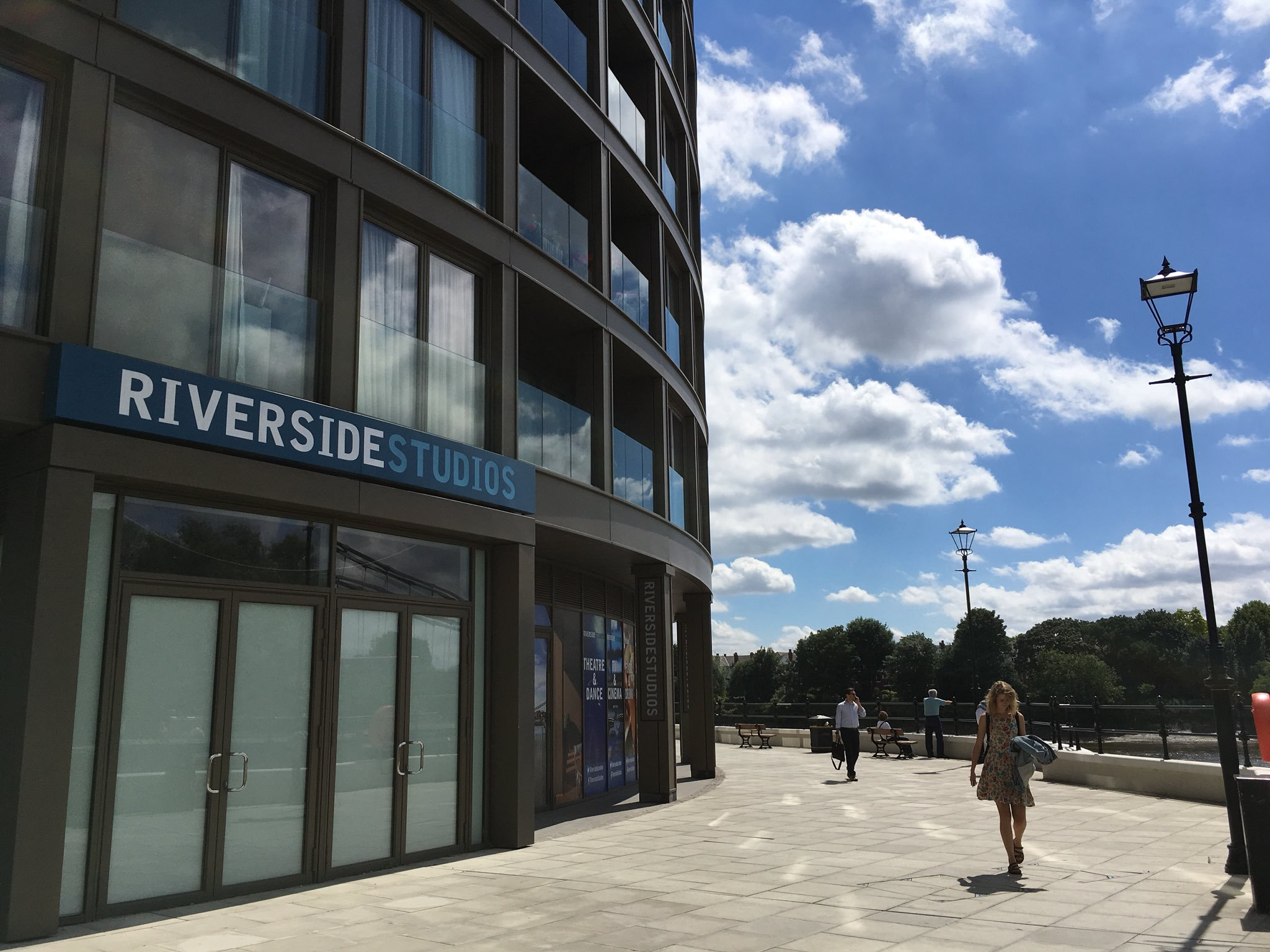
Riverside Studios, 2018

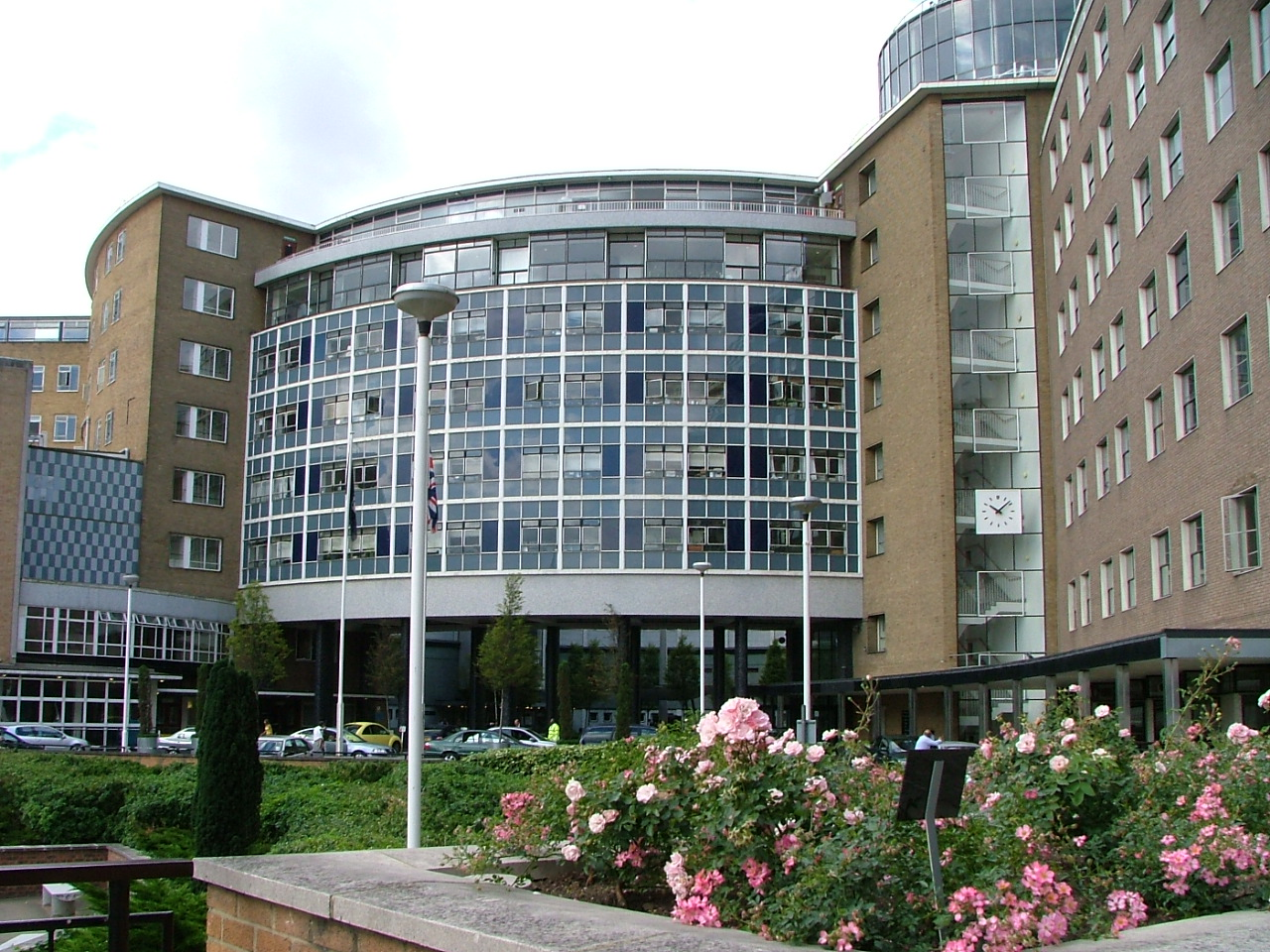
Television Centre, 2005

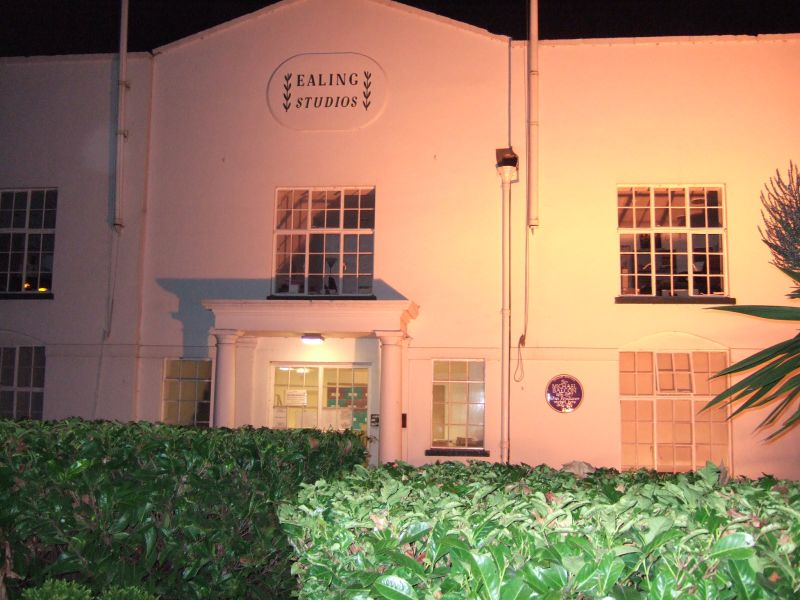
Ealing Studios, 2008

Six of the serials in the second season were recorded at Riverside, with the remaining three at the Television Centre. Ealing Studios was used to film model inserts in most stories.

Early inserts for special effects were filmed for Planet of Giants in late 1964 using 35 mm film. The show's regular cast—Hartnell, Russell, Hill, and Ford—filmed the sequences in which they appeared alongside giant props; the effect was achieved by recording the actors through glass and reflecting the object onto a half-silvered mirror. The footage was later deemed unsatisfactory, and the scenes were re-shot on 13 August. Weekly recording for the serial began on 21 August at the Television Centre, Studio 4. Due to director Mervyn Pinfield's other commitments, the fourth and final episode was directed by Douglas Camfield, who had worked as a production assistant to Waris Hussein during the show's first season. The final episode was recorded on 11 September. On 19 October 1964, Wilson decided to reduce the four-part serial to three episodes, as it was felt to be an unsatisfactory opening to the show's second season; he preferred to open the season with The Dalek Invasion of Earth, but Susan's departure in the serial prevented the change. The two 24-minute episodes were edited together into a single 25-minute episode to form a faster-paced climax featuring the main characters. Camfield was credited for the final episode.

The Dalek Invasion of Earth, directed by Richard Martin, was the first major location shoot for Doctor Who, with 35 mm filming in central London at Trafalgar Square, the statue of the Duke of Cambridge in Whitehall, Westminster Bridge, and the Royal Albert Hall in August 1964. The design team added Dalek markings on landmarks such as Nelson's Column, which police requested they remove. Weekly studio recording for the serial began on 18 September in Studio 1 at Riverside Studios in Hammersmith, the show's new regular studio. During camera rehearsals for the third episode on 2 October, Hartnell injured his back when a prop ramp malfunctioned; when Martin apologised for the incident, Hartnell assured that he would be fine, but Lambert insisted that he take several days to rest. Following discussions between Hartnell's solicitors and the BBC's, the BBC denied liability and paid for an X-ray. Hartnell was given a week off to recover, and the fourth episode underwent minor rewrites; Edmund Warwick doubled for Hartnell as The Doctor in the episode. The final episode was recorded on 23 October, marking a year of production since the filming of the show's first serial. Planet of Giants and The Dalek Invasion of Earth were recorded in the show's first production block alongside the first season, and held back to open the second season.

The regular cast took a six-week break before the show's second production block, beginning with The Rescue. Directed by Christopher Barry, it was recorded on 4 and 11 December 1964 at Riverside Studios; there was a happy atmosphere among the cast, including a picnic in Hartnell's dressing room on the first week. Forming a single production block with The Rescue, The Romans was filmed across four weeks, from 18 December 1964 to 15 January 1965, also directed by Barry. Martin returned to direct The Web Planet, recorded from 22 January to 26 February 1965. Martin wanted to use a greased neutral-density filter on shots of Vortis to capture its thin atmosphere, but found that the optical glass was too expensive, opting for a cheaper alternative; two special lenses were fitted, both of which broke at some point during production. Several recording sessions overran, including the second by 16 minutes, the third by 37, and the fourth by 15; among the problems were broken costumes, actors walking through shots, scenery problems causing actors to forget their lines, and delays in sets and studio lighting. The third recording had finished so late that the dressing room lights were switched off by studio management, forcing the crew to exit in darkness.

The Crusade, directed by Camfield, was recorded from 5–26 March 1965. For the first episode, a trained hawk was supplied by John Holmes of the Formakin Animal Centre in Benson, Oxfordshire. During recording of the final episode, actor Tutte Lemkow injured himself with a knife, which went to a finger bone on his right hand; he was taken to hospital for a tetanus shot. Camfield arranged for a cow carcass to be present during recording in order to achieve particular shots through the rotting rib cage; the carcass attracted flies and emitted an odour beneath the studio lights. Pinfield returned to direct The Space Museum, recorded from 2–23 April 1965 at the BBC Television Centre; this was a temporary move from Riverside Studios.

Martin was chosen to direct the six-part serial The Chase; he was reluctant to agree, but Lambert convinced him as he had become known as the "Dalek director", having directed both The Daleks and The Dalek Invasion of Earth. Lambert asked Martin to keep expenses to a minimum, but, recalling the overspend on The Web Planet, allocated a larger budget than normal; as a result, the preceding and following serials were produced with a minimal budget and little pre-filming. The Chase was recorded from 30 April to 4 June 1965. On 6 May, Russell and Hill were released in the afternoon of rehearsals for the second episode to pose for about 20 photographs used to illustrate their return home in the final episode; the shoot was directed by Camfield as part of the pre-filming work for The Time Meddler. Recording on The Time Meddler was due to take place at Riverside Studios until late May, when it was decided to switch back to Television Centre. The Time Meddler was recorded from 11 June to 2 July 1965. By this time, incoming producer John Wiles—set to replace Lambert in the coming months—joined the production. Hartnell found the change unsettling and threw fake tantrums to scare the production team to obey him; he later admitted to other cast members that he was only joking.

== Release ==
=== Promotion ===
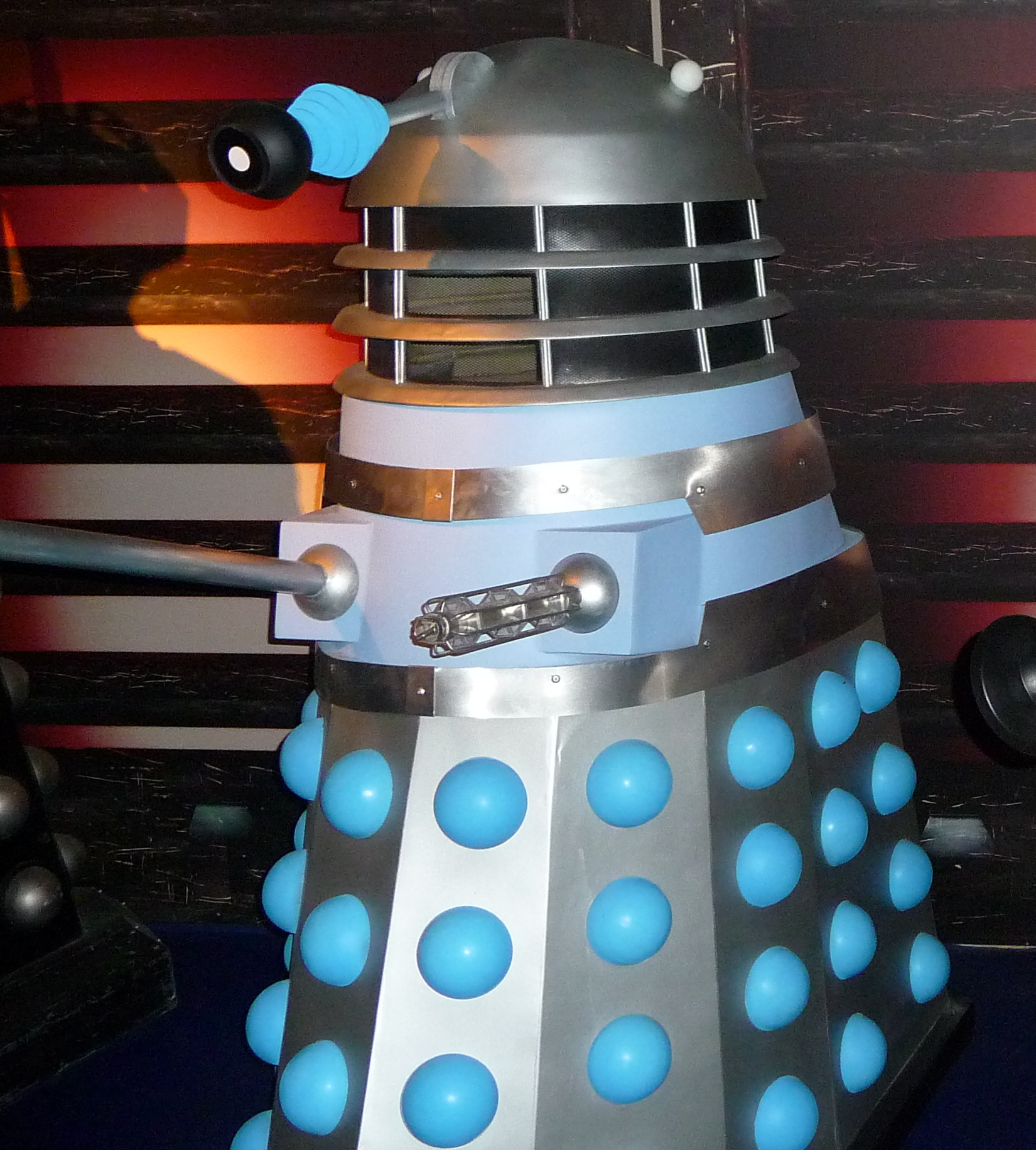
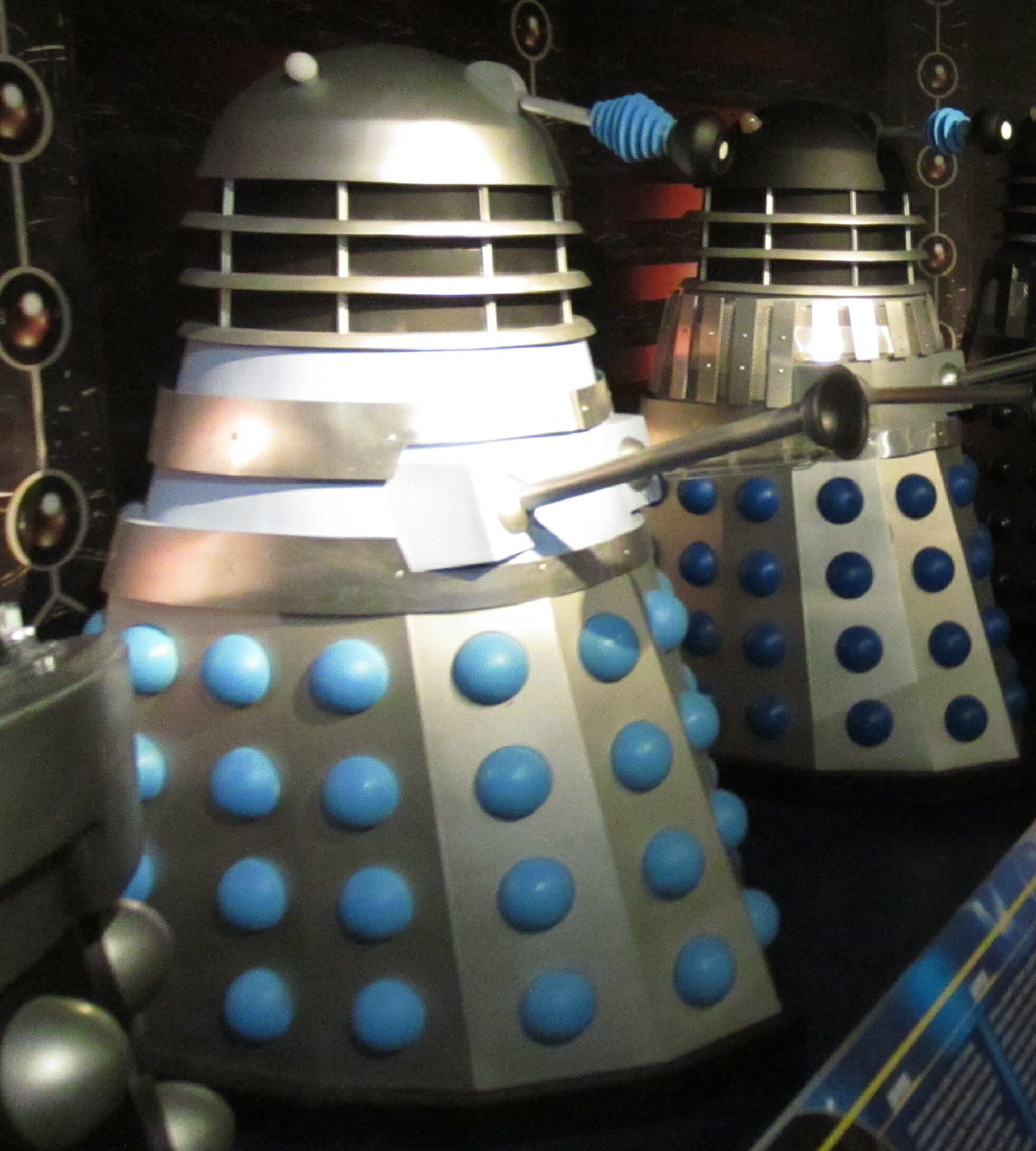
Several Dalek props were used in public appearances for promotion of the season's penultimate serial The Chase, which aired in the buildup to the release of the feature film Dr. Who and the Daleks (1965).

In September 1964, the BBC announced that Doctor Who would return for its second season in October, emphasising that it was one of its core pieces of content alongside coverage of the general election. Radio Times promoted the series with an article recapping the first season, and the Daily Sketch promoted its opening episode in the days before broadcast with a photograph of Ian and Susan. 20-second trailers for The Dalek Invasion of Earth began airing on 14 November 1964, immediately after the conclusion of Planet of Giants. The Daily Mail and Daily Mirror both ran stories about the return of the Daleks, and Radio Times featured the Daleks on its cover on 19 November, alongside a half-page article previewing the serial. On 24 December, trade paper Television Today ran a story about O'Brien's debut as Vicki in The Return; Radio Times and the Daily Mirror published similar stories on 31 December 1964 and 2 January 1965, respectively, with the latter featuring an image from the set of The Romans. Promotion for The Romans included a preview in Radio Times on 14 January, and syndicated stories in local papers on 16 January.

A special trailer for The Web Planet, filmed on 4 February 1965, features the Zarbi arriving at the BBC Television Centre before being shown to their dressing rooms. The trailer, screened on BBC1 on 6 February 1965, upset Martin, who felt that it undersold his work and made him feel "like a conjurer about to do an elaborate two and a half hour trick when all the audience know the secrets already"; Lambert responded that the comedic trailer was intentional to take "the curse out of the Zarbi" for younger viewers. The Web Planet was featured on the cover of Radio Times on 11 February alongside a half-page feature, and was promoted in The Children's Newspaper with an image of a Zarbi waiting at a bus stop on 13 February. On 25 March, Radio Times promoted The Crusades in a piece discussing guest stars Julian Glover and Bernard Kay; later that week, a comic strip in Radio Times featured the Doctor with a Dalek and a Zarbi. Several papers, including the Daily Express and Daily Telegraph, discussed the forthcoming departure of Russell and Hill on 2 April; Russell appeared on Junior Points of View the same day, while a photograph of Hill was published in the Daily Sketch the following day. The Space Museum was promoted in Radio Times on 22 April.

A photocall took place in early April 1965 with the Daleks and Mechonoids to promote The Chase, prompting several newspaper stories on 15 April; Lambert spoke to The Sun in response to the robots. The serial received a one-page preview in Radio Times, confirming the reports of Russell and Hill's departure in the final episode. The later episodes of The Chase aired in the buildup to the release of the feature film Dr. Who and the Daleks (1965), resulting in several pieces of cross promotion; a clip from the film was played on The Roy Castle Show—hosted by Roy Castle, one of the film's stars—about an hour after the broadcast of The Chase's fourth episode. Several Dalek props were used in public appearances for promotion. A photograph of the Doctor with Dracula and Frankenstein's monster was featured on the cover of Television Today on 10 June. The Time Meddler was previewed in Radio Times on 1 July, with a photograph of the new lead cast. The show received extensive publicity during the broadcast of The Time Meddler due to the release of Dr. Who and the Daleks; on 28 July, Lambert was interviewed by Denis Tuohy on Late Night Line-Up, and the Daily Mirror published a story about Hartnell's life and career.

=== Broadcast ===
Planet of Giants was transmitted on BBC1 in three weekly parts from 31 October to 14 November 1964, at 5:15 p.m. The BBC Film and Videotape Library did not select the serial for preservation, and the original tapes were wiped in the late 1960s. In 1977, 16mm film prints of the serial were discovered at BBC Enterprises. The broadcast time moved back to 5:40 p.m. for The Dalek Invasion of Earth, which aired in six weekly parts from 21 November to 26 December 1964; the final episode aired at 5:55 p.m. The serial was shown at the Longleat 20th Anniversary Celebration on 3 April 1983, and the first episode was screened at the National Film Theatre on 29 October 1983. All six episodes were screened at the theatre on 5 January 1999. The Rescue was broadcast in two weekly parts on 2 and 9 January 1965. Both parts of The Rescue were wiped in the late 1960s; BBC Enterprises had retained telerecordings of both episodes and returned them to the BBC in 1978. The Romans was transmitted in four weekly parts from 16 January to 6 February 1965. UK Gold broadcast the serial in episodic form from November 1992; it was originally scheduled earlier, but was replaced by The Aztecs.

The Web Planet was broadcast in six weekly parts from 13 February to 20 March 1965; the final episode aired later, at 5:55 p.m. The serial was believed to have been wiped in the early 1970s and presumed missing until negative film prints of all six episodes were recovered from BBC Enterprises in the late 1970s. Unedited prints were also discovered in Nigeria in 1984. The fourth episode was shown on 29 October 1983 at the National Film Theatre, and at regional events like the Bradford Playhouse and Film Theatre on 8 June 1984. British Satellite Broadcasting screened the serial between July and September 1990, and it was broadcast in episodic form on UK Gold in December 1992 alongside a compilation version. The Crusade was transmitted in four weekly parts from 27 March to 17 April 1965. The original tapes were wiped in the late 1960s, and the overseas film prints were destroyed around 1972 by BBC Enterprises. A 16mm film print of the third episode was retained by the BBC Film and Videotape Library. A film copy of the first episode was discovered in the ownership of film collector Bruce Grenville in New Zealand in January 1999, and returned to the BBC; it was sourced from the New Zealand Broadcasting Corporation. The second and fourth episodes remain missing, existing only through tele-snaps and off-air recordings.

The Space Museum was transmitted in four weekly parts from 24 April to 15 May 1965. The second episode was scheduled 10 minutes later than usual due to the 1965 FA Cup Final, while the third episode was broadcast 20 minutes later due to coverage of the 20th anniversary of VE Day. The original tapes were wiped in the late 1960s, but the entire serial was discovered at BBC Enterprises in 1977. It was screened by British Satellite Broadcasting on 22 September 1990, and by UK Gold in December 1992. The BFI National Archive holds a copy of the serial. The Chase was broadcast in six weekly parts from 22 May to 26 June 1965. The original tapes were erased in 1967 and 1969, but 16mm telerecordings created for overseas markets were discovered at BBC Enterprises in 1978. The serial was screened on 4 December 1988 at the National Film Theatre as part of a celebration of Doctor Who. The Time Meddler was transmitted in four weekly parts from 3 to 24 July 1965. The first episode was broadcast at 6:55 p.m. due to an extended edition of the preceding program Grandstand covering the Henley Regatta and Wimbledon Championships final. The tapes were cleared for wiping in 1967, and BBC Enterprises wiped the international version due to diminished sales by 1977. All four episodes (with some missing scenes) were discovered in Nigeria in 1984 and returned to the BBC by 1985; they were discovered to have been cut, with some missing scenes. The serial was repeated in a weekly broadcast on BBC2 from 3 to 24 January 1992.

=== Home media ===
==== VHS releases ====
Season	Story no.	Serial name	Duration	Release date		
Season	Story no.	Serial name	Duration	UK	Australia	USA / Canada
2	9	Planet of Giants	3 × 25 min.	January 2002	March 2002	May 2003
2	10	The Dalek Invasion of Earth	6 × 25 min.	May 1990	November 1990	February 1994
2	11; 12	The Rescue; The Romans	6 × 25 min.	September 1994	November 1994	March 1996
2	13	The Web Planet	6 × 25 min.	September 1990	May 1991	August 1994
2	14	The Hartnell Years (Note: Also includes the pilot episode of An Unearthly Child); The Crusade (Note: Episode 3)	1 × 35 min. 1 × 25 min.	3 July 1991	May 1992	January 1992
2	14; 15	The Crusade; The Space Museum	6 × 25 min.	5 July 1999	July 1999	January 2000
2	16	The Chase (Note: Released in a box set alongside Remembrance of the Daleks)	6 × 25 min.	September 1993	September 1993	October 1993
2	17	The Time Meddler	4 × 25 min.	4 November 2002 (Note: Part of The First Doctor: Special Edition Box Set)	December 2002	7 October 2003

==== DVD and Blu-ray releases ====
All releases are for DVD unless otherwise indicated:

- ^{(B)} indicates a Blu-ray release

Season	Story no.	Serial name	Duration	Release date		
Season	Story no.	Serial name	Duration	R2 / UK	R4 / AU	R1 / US
2	9	Planet of Giants	3 × 25 min.	20 August 2012	5 September 2012	11 September 2012
2	10	The Dalek Invasion of Earth	6 × 25 min.	16 June 2003	13 August 2003	7 October 2003
2	11–12	The Rescue; The Romans	6 × 25 min.	23 February 2009	2 April 2009	7 July 2009
2	13	The Web Planet	6 × 25 min.	3 October 2005	3 November 2005	5 September 2006
2	14	Lost in Time, Volume 1 The Crusade (Note: Episodes 1 and 3 of 4, with soundtracks of episodes 2 and 4)	2 × 25 min.	1 November 2004	December 2004 (Note: Re-released on 1 July 2010)	2 November 2004
2	15–16	The Space Museum; The Chase	10 × 25 min.	1 March 2010	6 May 2010	6 July 2010
2	17	The Time Meddler	4 × 25 min.	4 February 2008	2 April 2008	5 August 2008
2	9–17	Complete Season 2 (Note: Released as Doctor Who: The Collection – Season 2 in Region B. Released as Doctor Who – William Hartnell: Complete Season Two in Region A.)	39 × 25 min.	5 December 2022 ^{(B)}	25 January 2023 ^{(B)}	28 March 2023 ^{(B)}

=== Books ===
Season	Story no.	Library no. (Note: Number in Target's Doctor Who Library, if applicable)	Novelisation title	Author	Hardcover release date (Note: Published by Target's parent companies (Allen Wingate, W. H. Allen, BBC Books) unless otherwise indicated)	Paperback release date (Note: Published by Target Books (or by BBC Books under the Target Collection umbrella) unless otherwise indicated)	Audiobook	
Season	Story no.	Library no.	Novelisation title	Author	Hardcover release date	Paperback release date	Release date (Note: Unabridged from BBC Audio / AudioGo unless otherwise indicated)	Narrator
2	009	145	Planet of Giants	Terrance Dicks	—N/a	18 January 1990	4 May 2017	Carole Ann Ford
2	010	17	Doctor Who and the Dalek Invasion of Earth	Terrance Dicks	24 March 1977		5 November 2009	William Russell (Note: Dalek voices performed by Nicholas Briggs)
2	011	124	The Rescue	Ian Marter	20 August 1987	21 January 1988	4 April 2013	Maureen O'Brien
2	012	120	The Romans	Donald Cotton	16 April 1987	17 September 1987	5 January 2023	Several: Tim Treloar, Jamie Glover, Dan Starkey, Jon Culshaw, Maureen O'Brien, Louise Jameson, and Clare Corbett
2	013	73	Doctor Who and the Zarbi	Bill Strutton	16 September 1965 (Note: Published by Frederick Muller Ltd.)	2 May 1973	7 November 2005	William Russell
2	014	12	Doctor Who and the Crusaders	David Whitaker	24 February 1966	1967 (Note: Published by Green Dragon)	7 November 2005	William Russell
2	015	117	The Space Museum	Glyn Jones	15 January 1987	18 June 1987	4 February 2016	Maureen O'Brien
2	016	140	The Chase	John Peel	—N/a	20 July 1989	4 August 2011	Maureen O'Brien
2	017	126	The Time Meddler	Nigel Robinson	15 October 1987	17 March 1988	6 October 2016	Peter Purves

== Reception ==
=== Ratings ===
Viewers per episode (millions)
Audience measurement performed by Broadcasters' Audience Research Board

Planet of Giants was considered a strong debut to the second season, receiving 8.4 million viewers for the first two episodes and 8.9 million for the third. An Audience Research Report on the first episode indicated that the show had gained 17% of the viewing audience. The Dalek Invasion of Earth was successful among viewers, with an additional four million viewers over Planet of Giants; the first episode was the highest-rated BBC programme for northern England, and the third episode was the highest-rated for Wales and western England. The fifth episode was ranked 18th in the national ratings for the week, tied with ITV's Thank Your Lucky Stars. The high ratings continued for The Rescue, with 12 million viewers for the first episode. It was the eleventh most-watched programme of the week, and the top-rated BBC1 show in London and northern England. The second episode had higher ratings, with 13 million viewers, ranking it eighth for the week and the most-watched episode of the show to date. The Romans also maintained high viewership: 13 million viewers for the first episode, tying as the most-watched of the show to date. The second episode dropped to 11.5 million viewers, and was ranked 20th by TAM with an estimated viewership of 5.3 million homes. The third episode received a smaller audience of 10 million viewers, attributed to its broadcast in the wake of the televised funeral of Winston Churchill. The fourth episode reached 12 million viewers.

Viewership increased for The Web Planet, reaching a series-high of 13.5 million viewers for the first episode. The ratings dropped for the following episodes, with the final two hitting 12 million, but they were still considered successful, ranking among the top 20 programmes for each week; the first episode ranked joint 18th in the national charts, with an estimated viewership of 5.45 million households. Viewership continued to fall in The Crusade, dropping to 10.5 million views for the first episode, and 8.5 million for the second, dropping out of the top 20 for the week. The third and fourth episodes received 9 and 9.5 million viewers respectively, which were still considered acceptable. The Space Museum received similar viewership numbers, dropping from 10.5 million to 8.5 million viewers across the four weeks. Viewership numbers for The Chase were considered extremely positive, though the early summer months meant that it failed to gain the high audience figures for serials like The Dalek Invasion of Earth and The Web Planet. It gained generally a million viewers over The Space Museum, with the first episode receiving ten million viewers, and made its way into the top 20 most-viewed programmes for the night; the fourth and sixth episodes entered the top 10. The summer season and lack of Daleks led to smaller audience numbers for The Time Meddler, with 8.9 and 8.8 million viewers for the first two episodes and a drop to 7.7 and 8.3 million for the final two. The second episode was the highest-rated BBC show of the week South West region; the third episode dropped out of the top 20 programmes of the week, but garnered a larger audience share than ITV.

The Appreciation Index for the second season averaged 54; it ranged from 57 to 63 for the first three serials, while The Romans dropped from 53 for the first episode to 51 for the second, the lowest in the show's history to date, surpassed by 50 for the third and fourth episodes. The Web Planet's Appreciation Index began well but fell rapidly, dropping below 50 for the first time; the final episode set a new record low of 42. The Crusade recovered briefly, moving from 51 to 48 across the four weeks, and while The Space Museum began strong—51, 53, and 56, for the first three weeks—it fell sharply, with the final episode at 49. The final two stories generally recovered, ranging from 54 to 57 with The Chase, and 49 to 57 for The Time Meddler.

=== Critical response ===
The Dalek Invasion of Earth's final scene—in which the Doctor bids farewell to Susan, the show's first companion departure—was praised for its emotional impact.

Doctor Who's second season received generally positive responses. Hugh Greene, the Director-General of the BBC, was unimpressed by the concept of Planet of Giants, expressing his eagerness for the return of the Daleks. After the first episode of The Dalek Invasion of Earth, director of television Kenneth Adam called it "interesting"; the BBC Programme Review Board described the third episode as "outstanding", and the following week, executives felt that the show's quality was consistently high, with Greene eager to see the Daleks return in future stories. T. C. Worsley of the Financial Times praised the serial for creating a universal image for the Daleks. For The Rescue, Worsley felt that the Koquillion was lacking compared to the Daleks, but appreciated its name. Following the broadcast of the first episode of The Romans, The Guardian's Mary Crozier wrote that "the action was patchy and the dialogue uneven in quality"; at the Review Board, Adam praised Jacqueline Hill's performance in the second episode. The Web Planet received mixed reviews; the first episode was criticised by Peter Black of the Daily Mail, who described the main characters as "the dullest quartet in fiction". Patrick Skene Catling of Punch wrote that the serial was guilty of "ludicrous bathos", and Bill Edmund of The Stage and Television Today described the lighting effects as "pointless and annoying". The Scotsman's Peggie Phillips considered the serial to be a flop.

The Crusade was well-received; Bill Edmund of Television Today directed praise at Glover's performance and Whitaker's writing, declaring "the dialogue and the story ... one of the best we have had in this series". Conversely, Television Mail wrote that "the appallingly flat dialogue of Dr Who could hardly be heard ... above the creaking of the plot", noting that the show should only be viewed "by people who have a profound contempt for children". The Space Museum received a mixed response; the Times Educational Supplement described the serial as "enormously contrived", adding that the series "has run out of imagination". An audience report prepared following the first episode was generally positive, though a second report after the final episode was more critical. The Chase received generally positive responses. The Observer's Maurice Richardson praised Hartnell's performance and noted that the television show overrode his interest in watching the film Dr. Who and the Daleks. Marjorie Norris of Television Today described the final episode as "far and away the most dramatically successful" in the show's history, praising the battle between the Daleks and Mechonoids, the music and design, and the performances of Hartnell and Purves. Conversely, Philip Purser of the Sunday Telegraph described the show as "a ramshackle old serial these days" and noted that the Daleks were "fast losing their ancient menace". The Time Meddler was also well-received. Television Today's Bill Edmund enjoyed the character of the Monk, but was disappointed by the lack of monsters in the serial. J. C. Trewin of The Listener enjoyed the serial, "partly because no mechanical monsters arrived and partly because the logical consequences of time-meddling were faced".

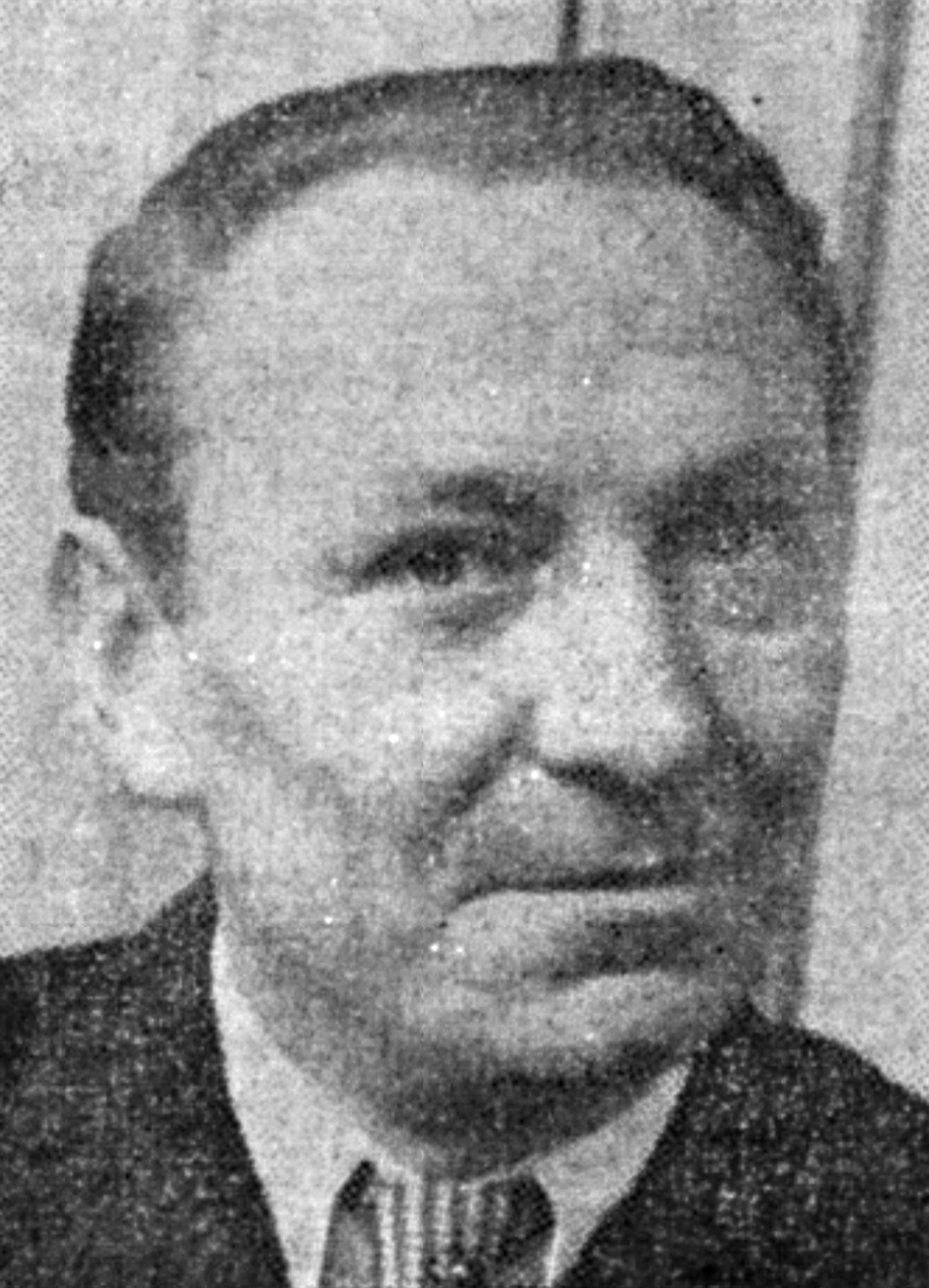
The only original cast member by the season's end, William Hartnell's performance as the Doctor received praise.

Retrospective reviews of the season were positive. In The Television Companion (1998), David J. Howe and Stephen James Walker found the plot of Planet of Giants to be "one of the weakest" in the series so far; they praised Hill's performance, and enjoyed Hartnell and Russell, though noted that Ford was "rather less impressive". Dave Golder of SFX (2012) described the serial as "undeniably slow, talky and lacking in excitement", particularly criticising Barbara's characterisation. Howe and Walker described The Dalek Invasion of Earth as "one of the series' all-time greats", praising the "poignant and moving" final scene and impressive location filming despite some clumsy direction; in A Critical History of Doctor Who (1999), John Kenneth Muir found the serial to be one of Doctor Who's darkest, and praised the location shooting and the characterisation of Susan, though noted some sexism in the Doctor's final remarks and criticised the special effects. Howe and Walker described The Rescue as "one of the best examples of character-driven drama from this period of the series' history", praising the character of Vicki, though noting that some parts of the plot remained unexplained; Cliff Chapman of Den of Geek (2009) found the serial "charming" and praised the performances, writing that the serial was only let down by its resolution. In The Discontinuity Guide (1995), Paul Cornell, Martin Day, and Keith Topping wrote that, in The Romans, "Hartnell shows the talent that got him the part", and praised the serial's atmosphere and comedy; Chapman found that the serial "does comedy well" with "witty dialogue, character moments, slapstick, and drama".

Cornell, Day, and Topping praised The Web Planet's imagination and ambition, but noted that it was "slow and silly looking" by modern standards; Muir described the serial as "a noble experiment" despite its mixed execution; he praised the costumes for the Zarbi, but criticised the Menoptra suits, alien voices, blurred lens, and Strutton's unoriginal scripts. Howe and Walker called The Crusade a "magnificent story", praising Hartnell's performance in the third episode as "one of his best and most intense performances as the Doctor", and applauding the set design and incidental music; Patrick Mulkern of Radio Times (2008) said that The Crusade was "arguably the first story where every aspect of the production works to perfection". Several reviewers felt that the first episode of The Space Museum was promising, but that its quality diminished over subsequent episodes; Muir compared it favourably to The Twilight Zone, though he felt that it was diminished by the trope of planetary revolution as previously told in The Daleks and The Web Planet. Some reviewers found The Chase's final episode to be its strongest, largely due to the battle between the Daleks and the Mechonoids and departure of Ian and Barbara; Cornell, Day, and Topping described the serial as "one of the most bizarre", consisting of "unconnected set pieces with only the barest remnant of a plot". Peter Butterworth's performance in The Time Meddler was lauded by critics, particularly his scenes alongside Hartnell; Mulkern of Radio Times called the serial "an utter delight" and "the Doctor Who equivalent of comfort food".

== Bibliography ==
- Ainsworth, John, ed. (2016). "The Crusade, The Space Museum, The Chase and The Time Meddler". Doctor Who: The Complete History. 5 (11). London: Panini Comics, Hachette Partworks. ISSN 2057-6048.
- Ainsworth, John, ed. (2019). "Shada, Dimensions in Time, The Curse of Fatal Death and Time Crash". Doctor Who: The Complete History. 90 (90). London: Panini Comics, Hachette Partworks. ISSN 2057-6048.
- Chapman, James (2006). Inside the Tardis: The Worlds of Doctor Who. I.B.Tauris. ISBN 1-84511-162-1.
- Cornell, Paul; Day, Martin; Topping, Keith (1995). The Discontinuity Guide. London: Virgin Books. ISBN 0-426-20442-5.
- Frankel, Valerie Estelle (2018). Women in Doctor Who: Damsels, Feminists and Monsters. Jefferson: McFarland & Company. ISBN 978-1-493-00016-6.
- Haining, Peter (1983). Doctor Who: A Celebration. London: W. H. Allen & Co. ISBN 0-491-03351-6.
- Howe, David J.; Walker, Stephen James; Stammers, Mark (1994). The Handbook: The Unofficial and Unauthorised Guide to the Production of 'Doctor Who'. Vol. 1 (2016 ed.). London: Telos Publishing. ISBN 978-1-845-83941-3.
- Howe, David J.; Walker, Stephen James (1998). Doctor Who: The Television Companion: Volume 1 (2021 ed.). London: BBC Books. ISBN 978-1-845-83156-1.
- Jusino, Teresa (13 November 2012). "All of Gallifrey's a Stage: The Doctor in Adolescence". In Stanish, Deborah; Myles, L.M. (eds.). Chicks Unravel Time: Women Journey Through Every Season of Doctor Who. Mad Norwegian Press. pp. 158–165. ISBN 978-1-935-23412-8.
- Loborik, Jason; Gibson, Annabel; Laing, Moray; Grange, Emma (2014). Doctor Who Character Encyclopedia (Updated ed.). Dorling Kindersley. ISBN 978-0-241-18222-2.
- Lofficier, Jean-Marc (1989). The Doctor Who Programme Guide. Target Books. ISBN 0-426-20342-9.
- Molesworth, Richard (2010). Wiped! Doctor Who's Missing Episodes. Telos Publishing. ISBN 978-1-84583-037-3.
- Muir, John Kenneth (1999). A Critical History of Doctor Who on Television. Jefferson, North Carolina: McFarland & Company. ISBN 978-0-786-40442-1.
- Smith, Paul MC (July 2021). Based on the Popular BBC Television Serial. Wonderful Books.
- Stanish, Deborah (13 November 2012). "Anything Goes". In Stanish, Deborah; Myles, L.M. (eds.). Chicks Unravel Time: Women Journey Through Every Season of Doctor Who. Mad Norwegian Press. pp. 224–230. ISBN 978-1-935-23412-8.
- Turner, Joan Frances (13 November 2012). "I'm From the TARDIS and I'm Here to Help You: Barbara Wright and the Limits of Intervention". In Stanish, Deborah; Myles, L.M. (eds.). Chicks Unravel Time: Women Journey Through Every Season of Doctor Who. Mad Norwegian Press. pp. 71–81. ISBN 978-1-935-23412-8.
- Wright, Mark, ed. (2016). "The Sensorites, The Reign of Terror and Planet of Giants". Doctor Who: The Complete History. 3 (21). London: Panini Comics, Hachette Partworks. ISSN 2057-6048.
- Wright, Mark, ed. (2017). "The Dalek Invasion of Earth, The Rescue, The Romans and The Web Planet". Doctor Who: The Complete History. 4 (61). London: Panini Comics, Hachette Partworks. ISSN 2057-6048.
