= Jemma Powell =

British actress (born 1980)

- Born: 25 July 1980 (age 45)
- Occupation: Actress
- Years active: 2001–present
- Spouse: Jack Savoretti
- Children: 3

Jemma Powell (born 25 July 1980) is a British actress. She is known for portraying Barbara Wright in several Doctor Who audio stories.

== Career ==
Powell made her screen debut in 2001, in The Hole. She is known for her roles in films such as François Ozon's Angel and Tim Burton's Alice in Wonderland. She played Maliika in Dan Wilde's Alpha Male also starring Danny Huston and Jennifer Ehle. Powell also played screen actress Jacqueline Hill in the Doctor Who spin-off drama An Adventure in Space and Time, which showed how the popular science fiction series was created, in 2013, and has also recorded several audio plays starring as Hill's on-screen character Barbara Wright since 2017.

Powell's theatre work includes The Cherry Orchard, directed by Dominic Dromgoole. She played Anya.

== Personal life and family ==
Powell is married to the English singer-songwriter Jack Savoretti. They have three children.

== Filmography ==
Year	Film	Role	Notes and awards
1998	Romeo Thinks Again	Love Heart Girl	
2001	The Hole	Minnie	
2003	Final Demand	Young girl	TV
2004	Foyle's War	Anne Bolton	TV
2005	Against Nature	Courtesan 1	
2005	Footballers' Wive$: Extra Time	Tatania	TV. Three episodes
2005	Hex	Bethany	TV. First episode
2006	Alpha Male	Maliika	
2007	Angel	Angelica	
2009	The Symmetry of Love	Elizabeth	
2009	The Knowledge of Others	Kate	
2010	Alice in Wonderland	Margaret Kingsleigh	
2012	The Seasoning House	Alexa	
2013	An Adventure in Space and Time	Jacqueline Hill	
2013	Closed Circuit	Elizabeth	
2017	Doctors	Heather Goldman	TV. One episode
2020	The Stranger	Becca Tripp	TV. Four episodes
2020	Devlis	Claire Stuart	TV. Eight episodes
2020	The Secret Garden	Grace	
