= Glyn Jones (South African writer) =

South African actor, writer and director (1931–2014)

- Born: 27 April 1931; Durban, South Africa
- Died: 2 April 2014 (aged 82); Vamos, Crete
- Occupations: actor, writer, director

Glyn Idris Jones (27 April 1931 – 2 April 2014) was a South African actor, writer and director. In a career spanning almost sixty years, his theatrical career encompassed work in the UK, on the continent, and in the United States.

== Early years ==
Glyn Idris Jones, actor, director, writer, and teacher, born in Durban, South Africa on 27 April 1931, of Italian and Welsh parentage.

After university and drama school, he toured South Africa as an actor with the National Theatre of South Africa before hitch-hiking and working his passage to London. On arriving in England in 1953, he took a job with The Sunday Times, then Kemsley Newspapers, and started writing plays in his spare time. His first acting engagement in the UK was in a summer season of weekly rep at the old Tivoli Theatre, New Brighton; extra work on television and a second summer season, this time on the Isle of Wight followed. Out of work periods saw him working in pubs, at Joe Lyons' Cadby Hall, for a small-time publisher and cleaning people's houses.

== Acting ==
As an actor in London he appeared in Reunion In Vienna at The Piccadilly, The Gorky Brigade Royal Court, The Great Society, Something Burning, Treasure Island, all at the Mermaid, Streamers at The Roundhouse, A Coat Of Varnish and Captain Brassbound's Conversion at The Haymarket, Measure For Measure at The Open Space, Safendas at The Almost Free. He has also played leading roles in many provincial theatres, on tours and on the continent. His television appearances have been numerous and he has also worked in film and on radio, his credits being too lengthy to mention. His last UK television appearance was for the BBC when he gave a chilling performance as the paedophile murderer, Sidney Cooke in The Lost Boys. He also appeared in two episodes of The Diary of Samuel Pepys.

Whilst working as actor he continued to write and had sixteen plays produced, the first in England being "Oh Brother" in Ipswich in 1962. Others include, in London, Early One Morning at the Arts Theatre, Champagne Charlie, based on the life of the great Music Hall star, George Leybourne, at the Mayfair Theatre, also on tour and in 2013 its final performance at Wilton's Music Hall. Also Women Around at Worthing, and Tell me you Love me (a.k.a. How do you like your Wagner?) at Perth.

His play The 88 was produced in 1979 at the Old Vic, taking as its subject the mutiny of an Irish Regiment in India in 1920. As is the way of things, the play had been written some ten years before it came to being produced, and been in pre-production for some considerable time, however, a few weeks before the opening night, Lord Mountbatten was murdered by the IRA. At the press conference to launch the play, two critics were heard discussing this fact and one declared, 'How dare they put on this play so soon after dear Lord Louis's murder. I am going to tear it to pieces.' Which he and several others did. Devastated by such viciousness, that was unrelated to the qualities of his play, and in spite of an audience reaction that was the exact opposite to blinkered, biased, critics, Glyn Jones did not write another word for ten years. Felix Barker writing about The 88 in the Evening News said, 'There are occasions, rare and important, when the theatre clasps hands with actuality. This happened last night...'

In 2013 he made a final witty appearance before the cameras, playing an obstreperous Film Producer in an advertisement selling the diverse beauty of Crete as a filming location: Filming In Crete from Indigo View.

== Doctor Who ==
Late in 1964, Jones was contacted by David Whitaker, the story editor on Doctor Who, with a view to the writer contributing a serial. Whitaker though, had been succeeded by Dennis Spooner by the time the scripts of The Space Museum were prepared for production. Jones was dismayed by the editing of his scripts. Spooner had cut much of the humorous content, feeling that such material was inappropriate in what he saw as a high-concept science-fiction story. This was Jones' only contribution to Doctor Who as a writer. However, he would go on to play Krans in 1975's The Sontaran Experiment. This was a rare example of a Doctor Who writer also acting on the programme.

== Directing ==
He directed at a number of theatres in the UK, at RADA and, in America at James Madison University in Virginia where he also acted in a number of productions, Dodge in Buried Child, Argon in The Imaginary Invalid and Eddie Carbone in A View From the Bridge, and for a summer season at the Wayside Theatre, Virginia he directed two plays, Tribute and The Innocents and acted in three: Barefoot in the Park, Private Lives and A Funny Thing Happened on the Way to the Forum. He performed in Neil Simon's Fools and The Fantasticks in dinner theatre and was invited by Furman University to play Dysart in Equus and work with students on Shakespeare.

== Writing ==
He wrote the screenplay for the Oscar Nominated Columbia Film, A King's Story on the life of the Duke of Windsor Edward VIII. He was chief writer and script editor for 20th Century Fox's most successful children's series, Here Come the Double Deckers!. He also wrote films for the Children's Film Foundation, two of which were award winners. Jones contributed a half dozen scripts for the Children's Film Foundation series The Magnificent Six and 1/2 (1968–69), plus nine scripts for Here Come the Double Deckers! (1970–71), on which he was also script editor, a TV series derived from the CFF films. Jones wrote an episode of The Gold Robbers (1969) around the same time.

In the UK he had written book and lyrics for two musicals with composer Kenny Clayton, Cupid and Black Maria and his witty two hander play, Early One Morning became the musical Fugue in Two Flats with music by Paul Knight. His popular musical version of Peter Pan has music by Andy Davidson. After moving to Crete he added to his canon of book and lyrics for musicals when he wrote a musical based on the life of the infamous Spanish courtesan of La Belle Époque, La Belle Otero, music by Christopher Littlewood, two opera libretti for which, at the time of his death, he was looking for a composer, and two new plays, a comedy set in Athens, Marry Go Round, and The Muses Darling, a play on the last few days of the life of Christopher Marlowe.

In 1997 he moved to Vamos, Crete, Greece, which meant forgoing any acting or directing but he kept writing, starting with his autobiography No Official Umbrella, two novels, Angel and The Journeys We Make, a Gothic horror The Museum Mysteries & Other Short Stories, and five books in his comedy / thriller series featuring a quirky private eye, Thornton King, and his sidekick, Miss Holly Day: Dead On Time, Just In Case, Dead On Target, The Cinelli Vases, and Celluloid and Tinsel. When Jones died, the last in the Thornton King series was with the editors and is to be published posthumously. All the foregoing novels are published by DCG Media Group. Also published, Doctor Who and the Space Museum, (W.H.Allen / Virgin), also released as an audio book (BBC), The Double Deckers (Pan), and a volume of children's poetry Hildegarde H And Her Friends (Abydos Publishing). In America his plays Red in the Morning, Generations, Third Drawer from the Top, have had productions. His play Thriller of the Year, first produced at the Golders Green Hippodrome in 1967, still receives numerous productions in Germany. The week before he died, he was working with Beate Staufenbiel on the translation into German of two more of his plays, Rosemary and Hear the Hyena Laugh which received its posthumous premiere in January 2016. Three plays have been published by Samuel French and seven by DCG Media Group.

== Autobiography ==
His autobiography, No Official Umbrella, has been described as, '... vastly entertaining from its description of his South African boyhood to his early vigorous and experimental life in the rural theatres of England and on to the big London stage. It is full of young people with now familiar names = on the way up, all made human, not just name dropping. Anecdotes and good stories by the bundle... A truly remarkable record of a life on the British stage.'

== Death ==
Jones died at his home Vamos, Crete, Greece on 2 April 2014.
