= Barbara Wright (Doctor Who) =

Fictional character in Doctor Who

- Doctor Who character
- Jacqueline Hill as Barbara Wright
- First appearance: An Unearthly Child (1963)
- Last appearance: The Chase (1965)
- Portrayed by: Jacqueline Hill
- Voiced by: Carole Ann Ford, Maureen O'Brien
- Duration: 1963–1965

In-universe information
- Species: Human
- Gender: Female
- Occupation: History teacher
- Affiliation: First Doctor
- Spouse: Ian Chesterton
- Home: Earth
- Nationality: British (English)
- Home era: 20th century

Barbara Wright is a fictional character in the British science fiction television series Doctor Who and a companion of the First Doctor. She was one of the programme's first regulars and appeared in the bulk of its first two seasons from 1963 to 1965, played by Jacqueline Hill. Prior to Hill being cast the part had originally been offered to actress Penelope Lee, who turned the role down. Barbara appeared in 16 stories (74 episodes). In the film version of one of the serials, Dr. Who and the Daleks (1965), Barbara was played by actress Jennie Linden, but with a very different personality and backstory, which includes her being a granddaughter of "Dr Who".

== Appearances ==
=== Television ===
Barbara Wright first appears in the first Doctor Who serial, An Unearthly Child (1963), where she is teaching history at Coal Hill School in London in 1963, working with science teacher Ian Chesterton (William Russell). They are curious about their student Susan Foreman (Carole Ann Ford), who shows an unusually advanced knowledge of science and history, but a rudimentary knowledge of other subjects. In an attempt to learn more about Susan, Barbara and Ian follow her home to a junkyard, where they hear her voice coming from what appears to be a police box. During a confrontation with her grandfather, the Doctor (William Hartnell), Barbara rushes in to the police box, only to discover that its exterior hides the much larger interior of the TARDIS. After the Doctor reveals to Barbara and Ian that he and Susan are aliens exiled from their own planet, he tells them he cannot risk their revealing information about the TARDIS to their contemporary world, and dematerialises the craft against Susan's protests. At this point in the series the Doctor had no control over where or when it would land, making a return to London in 1963 impossible to co-ordinate. They are transported back in time to 100,000 BCE Earth, where they are captured by a prehistoric tribe seeking the secret of fire. Once they escape back to the TARDIS, their second trip takes them to the planet Skaro, where they encounter the Daleks for the first time. At the end of the first episode of that serial, Barbara becomes separated from her fellow travellers and is threatened by an unseen creature with a metal arm, marking the first appearance of a Dalek.

In the subsequent story, The Edge of Destruction, tensions between the TARDIS crew reach the point of overt conflict when the Doctor accuses Ian and Barbara of trying to sabotage the TARDIS in an attempt to return to 1963. Barbara remains level-headed and logical, allowing the Doctor to trace the source of the distress to telepathic influences from the TARDIS (which is trying to warn them of a major failure). Seeing that Barbara has been hurt by his accusations, the Doctor apologises and begins to realise he can rely on the two teachers, sealing a friendship which lasts until their eventual departure from the TARDIS. Although mutually respectful and increasingly affectionate, the relationship between the Doctor and Barbara is often tested by their opposing viewpoints. In The Aztecs, Barbara is mistaken for the reincarnation of a high priest, Yetaxa, after they find her in possession of his bracelet. Barbara seizes this opportunity to change the course of history, and tries to persuade the Aztecs to abandon human sacrifice, so that by the time Hernán Cortés – who overthrew the Aztec empire – lands he will find a glorious civilisation. The Doctor warns Barbara that she cannot rewrite history, but his protests fall on deaf ears. Barbara fails and, although she has influenced some Aztecs, history remains on course.

Angry at Ian, the Doctor tries to take him and Barbara home, but in The Reign of Terror they end up in the French Revolution, where Barbara and Susan are captured and nearly guillotined. In the second season opener, Planet of Giants (1964), the TARDIS crew are miniaturised and Barbara becomes infected by a deadly insecticide. Barbara sees the departure of Susan and aids in the rescue of the abandoned orphan Vicki (Maureen O'Brien), who takes Susan's place on the TARDIS. In the subsequent adventure, The Romans, Barbara is sold off as a slave and ends up as a servant in Nero's palace; due to his interest in her, Nero's wife Poppaea tries to poison her. Barbara and Ian leave in The Chase (1965). After the Daleks who have been pursuing the TARDIS have been destroyed, Barbara suggests to Ian they use the abandoned Dalek time machine to get home. The Doctor is furious and tries to persuade them to stay with him by suggesting the journey might kill them, but the two teachers had made up their minds. After an emotional farewell to the Doctor and Vicki, Barbara and Ian are returned to London, albeit two years after their disappearance. Back on the TARDIS, the Doctor uses the time-space visualiser to check they have returned safely, and tells Vicki how much he will miss them.

Following her departure in The Chase, Barbara has been name-checked in the series on four subsequent occasions. She was mentioned by Vicki in episode one of The Time Meddler; by the first Doctor in episode four of The Massacre, by his third incarnation on Spiradon in episode one of Planet of the Daleks and again by the seventh Doctor, who intoned her name amongst a list of former companions to ward off the haemovore attack in The Curse of Fenric. Barbara was also mentioned in episode one of the 1993 Children In Need charity special Dimensions In Time and again in Death of the Doctor, a two part story in the fourth series of The Sarah Jane Adventures transmitted in October 2010. After meeting Jo Grant and the Eleventh Doctor, Sarah Jane Smith reveals that she has researched the lives of some of the Doctor's Earth-bound companions and discovered that Ian and Barbara have married each other, become professors, live in Cambridge and are rumoured to have not aged since the 1960s.

This non-aging rumour however, has been seemingly contradicted by an elderly Ian Chesterton’s appearance in the 2022 episode, "The Power of the Doctor".

In the 2016 spin off Class, the refurbished Coal Hill Academy contains a building called "The Barbara Wright Building".

=== Other media ===
Since 1994, the character has appeared in several Doctor Who novels from Virgin Publishing and BBC Books. In the BBC Books novel, The Face of the Enemy by David A. McIntee (1998), the story of Ian and Barbara, now married to each other, is picked up in the early 1970s. In this book, they have a young son named John. Barbara also appears in several Big Finish Productions audio dramas, which are narrated by surviving cast members Carole Ann Ford or William Russell. Actress Jemma Powell, who played Jacqueline Hill and Barbara in the docudrama An Adventure in Space and Time, also voiced the character in Big Finish audio dramas.

In the novelisation of The Daleks, Doctor Who in an Exciting Adventure with the Daleks by David Whitaker, Barbara and Susan have just been in a car accident when they first meet Ian. After entering the TARDIS, the remainder of the story largely follows the events of The Daleks.

In issue #456 of Doctor Who Magazine, the Eleventh Doctor investigates strange psychic metal and finds Ian and Barbara inside, who believe they are teaching several classes for a wide range of students. In the following issues the two help the Doctor investigate a conspiracy that stretches through the years they knew 'their' Doctor and beyond. At the end, Ian and Barbara are married.

== Film version ==
Barbara
- Dr. Who and the Daleks character
- Adapted by: Milton Subotsky
- Portrayed by: Jennie Linden

In-universe information
- Species: Human
- Family: Dr. Who (grandfather); Susan; Louise (cousin)
- Home: Earth
- Home era: 1963
- Appears in: Dr. Who and the Daleks (1965)

In the film Dr. Who and the Daleks (1965), Barbara (portrayed by Jennie Linden) is one of Dr. Who's granddaughters and the girlfriend of Ian Chesterton. Barbara does not appear in Daleks' Invasion Earth 2150 A.D. (1966) being replaced by Louise, Dr. Who's niece, with no mention as to her fate.

=== Other media ===
==== Comics ====
The character also appears in the Dell comic strip adaptation of the film and the short story The House on Oldark Moor by Justin Richards.

In Dr. Who and the House on Oldark Moor, Barbara met an ancient Roman legion in 64 A.D., and travelled to Oldark Moor and met Count Tarkin. Barbara was absent during two of Dr. Who and Susan's subsequent adventures, as was Ian, with Susan believing that she eventually stopped seeing, though she had not actually gotten over him.

In Doctor Who 3 - The Third Motion Picture, partway through the Scriptwriter's typing the script of the third Dr. Who film which would have featured Barbara rekindling her relationship with an increasingly, literally clownish Ian, Susan realised that she and all her family were fictional constructs; she reached out into the real world and killed the Scriptwriter by staking him through the heart.

== Reception ==
In a review of Meglos (1980), in which Hill was cast as the villain, Radio Times's Mark Braxton wrote that Barbara "will always be one of the great companions", speculating that her "magnificently haughty turn" as Yetaxa in The Aztecs was why she was cast in Meglos. Gavin Fuller of The Daily Telegraph named Barbara the sixth best female Doctor Who companion. Will Salmon of SFX listed the departure of Ian and Barbara as the eighth best companion departure. In 2010, readers of Radio Times voted Barbara as the 26th greatest companion, out of 48 options.
