= Christopher Barry =

British television director (1925–2014)

- Born: Christopher Chisholm Barry; 20 September 1925; East Greenwich, London, England
- Died: 7 February 2014 (aged 88); Horton Hospital, Banbury, Oxfordshire
- Education: University of Cambridge
- Occupation: Television director
- Years active: 1949–2000
- Known for: Doctor Who

Christopher Chisholm Barry (20 September 1925 – 7 February 2014) was a British television director. He worked extensively in BBC television drama and became best known for his work on the science fiction series Doctor Who. He also directed the direct to video Doctor Who spin-off Downtime in 1995.

== Early life and education ==
Barry was the son of Sir Gerald Barry, editor of the News Chronicle and director general of the Festival of Britain in 1951, and his first wife Gladys, He attended Blundell's School in Devon and the University of Cambridge, before service in the Royal Air Force.

== Career ==
Barry became a trainee at Ealing Studios and worked on the film The Ship That Died of Shame (1955) as an assistant director to Basil Dearden. He joined the BBC as a production assistant in 1955.

In 1963, Barry was asked by producer Verity Lambert to be one of the initial directors of the BBC's new science fiction television series Doctor Who. Barry's work on Doctor Who went on to cover the longest span of any director during the original run of the series, overseeing episodes until 1979.

Among Barry's other television credits were episodes of Compact (1962), Ann Veronica (1964), Paul Temple (1970–71), Z-Cars (1971–78), Poldark (1975), The Onedin Line (1977), All Creatures Great and Small (1978–80), Juliet Bravo (1980) and Dramarama (1989). His other science fiction credits were for Out of the Unknown (1969), Moonbase 3 (1973) and The Tripods (1984). He appeared in a feature covering his life's work on the DVD release of the Doctor Who serial The Creature from the Pit (1979), released in May 2010.

== Personal life ==
Barry lived in Oxfordshire in his retirement. He died following an escalator fall in a shopping centre in Banbury on 7 February 2014. An inquest into his death was held on 5 June 2014.

== Doctor Who credits ==
- The Daleks – episodes 1, 2, 4 and 5 (1963–64)
- The Rescue (1965)
- The Romans (1965)
- The Savages (1966)
- The Power of the Daleks (1966)
- The Dæmons (1971)
- The Mutants (1972)
- Robot (1974)
- The Brain of Morbius (1976)
- The Creature from the Pit (1979)
- Downtime (1995)
