= Jacqueline Hill =

English actress (1929–1993)

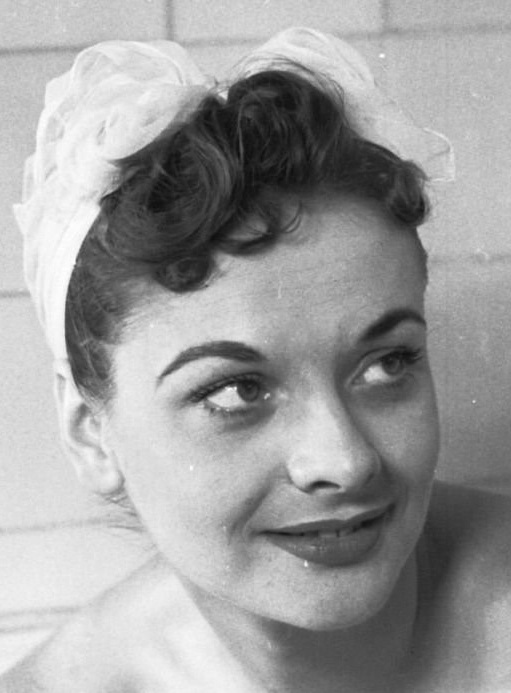
- Hill in 1953
- Born: Grace Jacqueline Hill; 17 December 1929; Birmingham, England
- Died: 18 February 1993 (aged 63); London, England
- Education: Royal Academy of Dramatic Art
- Occupation: Actress
- Years active: 1953–66; 1978–86
- Television: Doctor Who (1963–65; 1980)
- Spouse: Alvin Rakoff (m. 1958)
- Children: 2

Grace Jacqueline Hill (17 December 1929 – 18 February 1993) was a British actress known for her role as Barbara Wright in the BBC science-fiction television series Doctor Who. As the history teacher of Susan Foreman, the Doctor's granddaughter, Barbara was the first Doctor Who companion to appear on-screen in 1963, with Hill speaking the series' first words. She played the role for nearly two years.

Hill returned to Doctor Who in 1980 for an appearance in the serial Meglos, as the Tigellan priestess Lexa.

== Biography ==
Hill was orphaned as a toddler and brought up by her grandparents. She was taken out of school at the age of 14 to enable her younger brother to continue. She then worked at Cadbury's, which had an amateur dramatics society. She was encouraged to apply for, and was awarded, a scholarship at the Royal Academy of Dramatic Art, and entered RADA at the age of 19. Hill graduated in 1951.

Hill made her stage debut in London's West End in The Shrike. In 1958 she married the director Alvin Rakoff, having the previous year appeared in his BBC adaptation of Rod Serling's American TV play Requiem For A Heavyweight. This production featured former bit-part actor Sean Connery; Hill had recommended that Rakoff cast him, because she believed Connery would be popular with female viewers.

She was offered the part of Barbara Wright in Doctor Who, following discussions with producer Verity Lambert about the role. She had first met Lambert when they worked at ABC Weekend TV.

Hill preferred the historical Doctor Who stories; her favourite serials were The Aztecs and The Crusade. Shortly after leaving the series in 1965 she gave up acting in order to raise a family, resuming her career in 1978. Her later TV credits included Tales of the Unexpected and the 1978 BBC Television Shakespeare version of Romeo and Juliet (as Lady Capulet), which was directed by her husband.

In October 1980, she returned to Doctor Who in a guest role, portraying Priestess Lexa, leader of the religiously fanatical Deons, in the story Meglos. By this time the Doctor was played by Tom Baker.

== Death ==
Jacqueline Hill died of breast cancer in 1993, aged 63.

== Portrayals ==
In 2013, as part of the Doctor Who 50th anniversary celebrations, the BBC produced a docu-drama relating the story of the creation and early days of the series, titled An Adventure in Space and Time. Hill appeared as a character in the drama, portrayed by actress Jemma Powell.

== Filmography ==
=== Film ===
Year	Title	Role	Notes
1953	The Blue Parrot	Maureen Maguire	
1964	The Comedy Man	Sandy Lavery	

=== Television ===
Year	Title	Episode(s)	Role	Network	Archive status
1953	The Rose and the Ring	Mini-series	Fairy Blackstick	BBC Television Service	Missing
1954	The Vise	Series 1, Episode 5: Death Pays No Dividends	Barmaid (uncredited)	ABC	Exists
1955	BBC Sunday-Night Theatre	Series 6, Episode 23: The Legend of Pepito	Jeannie	BBC Television Service	Missing
1955	Three Empty Rooms	TV Movie	Louise Shoemaker	BBC Television Service	Missing
1956	BBC Sunday-Night Theatre	Series 7, Episode 16: The Seat of the Scornful	Cynthia Lee	BBC Television Service	Missing
1956	ITV Television Playhouse	Series 1, Episode 44: Martine	Jeanne	ITV (Rediffusion)	Missing
1957	BBC Sunday-Night Theatre	Series 8, Episode 13: Requiem for a Heavyweight	Grace Carney	BBC Television Service	Audio recording survives
1957	Joyous Errand	All 6 episodes	Trooper	BBC Television Service	Missing
1958	Armchair Theatre	Series 2, Episode 18: Man in the Corner	Florence Miller	ITV (ABC)	Missing
1958	ITV Television Playhouse	Series 3, Episode 39: Poet's Corner	Unknown	ITV (Rediffusion)	Missing
1958	ITV Play of the Week	Series 3, Episode 48: The Curious Savage	Miss Willie	ITV	Missing
1959	BBC Sunday-Night Theatre	Series 10, Episode 47: The Velvet Alley	Pat Pandish	BBC Television Service	Missing
1959	The Flying Doctor	Episode 24: Brainstorm	Ellen Ferguson	ITV	Exists
1960	Saturday Playhouse	Episode 51: The Man Who Came to Dinner	Maggie Cutler	BBC Television Service	Missing
1960	BBC Sunday-Night Play	Episode 5: The Chopping Block	Jane	BBC Television	Exists
1961	The Watching Cat	TV Movie	Catherine Ellis	BBC Television	Missing
1961	Drama '61	Series 1, Episode 4: The Executioners	Mrs. Lander	ITV (ATV)	Missing
1961	The Men from Room 13	Series 2, Episodes 11-13: The Men Who Made Trouble Pts. 1-3	Miss Angel	BBC Television	Missing
1962	The Six Proud Walkers	Six episodes	Sally Walker	BBC Television	Missing
1962	No Hiding Place	Series 4, Episode 11: The Bank Job	Sonya Gardener	ITV (Rediffusion)	Partial
1962	Out of This World	Episode 6: Medicine Show	Lil Harmon	ITV (ABC)	Missing
1962	Maigret	Series 3, Episode 12: The Trap	Mme. Helen Moncin	BBC Television	Exists
1963	ITV Play of the Week	Series 9, Episode 7: The Fixers	Helen Harrison	ITV	Exists
1963	Doctor Who	Series 1, 40 episodes	Barbara Wright	BBC Television	Partial (9 episodes missing)
1964	Doctor Who	Series 1, 40 episodes	Barbara Wright	BBC One	Partial (9 episodes missing)
1964	Doctor Who	Series 2, 34 episodes	Barbara Wright	BBC One	Partial (2 episodes missing)
1965	Doctor Who	Series 2, 34 episodes	Barbara Wright	BBC One	Partial (2 episodes missing)
1966	No Hiding Place	Series 9, Episode 4: You Never Can Tell Till You Try	Sarah Peterson	ITV (Rediffusion)	Missing
1978	Crown Court	Series 7, Episodes 71-72: A Man With Everything Pts. 2 & 3	Margaret Eden	ITV (Granada)	All programmes exist from this point.
1978	BBC Television Shakespeare	Series 1, Episode 1: Romeo & Juliet	Lady Capulet	BBC Two	All programmes exist from this point.
1980	Doctor Who	Series 18: Meglos (4 episodes)	Lexa	BBC One	All programmes exist from this point.
1982	Angels	Series 8, Episode 27	Mrs. Muirhead	BBC One	All programmes exist from this point.
1983	Tales of the Unexpected	Series 6, Episode 10: The Luncheon	Melanie Litmayer	ITV (Anglia)	All programmes exist from this point.
1984	Tales of the Unexpected	Series 7, Episode 12: Accidental Death	Mrs. Milvain	ITV (Anglia)	All programmes exist from this point.
1986	ScreenPlay	Series 1, Episode 1: All Together Now	Jenny	BBC Two	All programmes exist from this point.
1986	Paradise Postponed	5 episodes	Mrs. Mallard-Greene	ITV (Thames)	All programmes exist from this point.
