= Between the Ears =

- Programme logo
- Genre: Adventurous Radio
- Running time: Various
- Country of origin: UK
- Home station: BBC Radio 3
- Original release: 5 October 1993

Between the Ears is a radio series for "innovative... features that make adventurous use of sound" on BBC Radio 3. The first edition, Monument (London 1935-1993), aired on 5th October 1993 and went on to win the Special Prize for Music Radio Programmes at the Prix Italia in 1994.

A season of Between the Ears programmes is produced roughly twice a year, and when the programmes are in season they are broadcast on Sunday nights, UK time.

Between the Ears initial 1993 run included newly-commissioned works by composers Christopher Fox and Peter Howell, both realised at the BBC Radiophonic Workshop. Alongside a new radio feature by the Dutch composer Louis Andriessen and a re-airing of The Dreams from Barry Bermange and Delia Derbyshire's Inventions for Radio series, which was first broadcast on the Third Programme in 1964.

Between the Ears won a 2017 New York Festivals Radio Gold Award for best sound for an adaptation of The Shepherd by Amber Barnfather, which was performed by actor Luke Thompson in December 2016. Sound design was by David Chilton, with music and mouth/body percussion by the Saint Martin Singers, and Vampire aircraft sound effects recorded at the Royal Air Force Museum London.
