= Audio documentary =

Form of non-fiction audio storytelling

Audio documentary is a form of non-fiction audio storytelling that documents, examines, or interprets real people, events, places, experiences, or issues through recorded sound. It may combine interviews, field recordings, archival material, narration, music, silence, and sound editing as elements of documentary narrative.

The term is used for documentary works produced in different audio media, including both radio and podcasting. Academic and professional usage overlaps with but is not limited to the older tradition of the radio documentary. Audio documentary also overlaps historically with the radio feature, whose relationship to documentary has varied across broadcasting traditions. In an audio documentary, sound is not merely a means of transmitting spoken information but may function as a primary element of narrative construction. Tone of voice, acoustic environment, texture, timing, editing, and the relationships among different sounds can contribute to the work's meaning and structure.

Audio documentary overlaps with radio documentary, the radio feature, and forms of narrative and documentary podcasting. The boundaries between these terms have varied historically and among different broadcasting traditions.

== Terminology and scope ==
The terminology surrounding documentary audio has varied across periods and broadcasting traditions. Radio documentary historically refers to documentary work associated with radio broadcasting, while audio documentary has also been used for works distributed outside conventional radio, including podcasts and other recorded-audio formats.

The two terms are consequently sometimes used interchangeably, particularly when discussing the history of documentary broadcasting, but contemporary educational and scholarly sources also use audio documentary as a broader term encompassing work made for both podcast and public-radio contexts.

An audio documentary is not necessarily synonymous with investigative journalism. Its practitioners may work within journalism, broadcasting, oral history, ethnography, personal narrative, or artistic sound practice. Approaches therefore range from strongly journalistic productions to more subjective, narrative, essayistic, or experimental works.

Recorded material is typically selected, arranged, and edited into a constructed sequence. The resulting documentary is therefore not an unmediated reproduction of reality. Decisions concerning interview subjects, recording locations, narration, sequencing, music, silence, and sound design influence how the subject is represented and understood.

McHugh describes radio documentary and narrative podcasting as forms of carefully constructed audio storytelling that use the particular grammar and aesthetics of sound, including vocal tone, texture, rhythm, and temporality.

== Common elements ==
Audio documentaries may use a combination of:

- interviews and personal testimony;
- field recordings and ambient sound;
- archival and historical recordings;
- narration or explanatory speech;
- music;
- silence;
- sound design;
- editing and juxtaposition of different audio sources.

There is no fixed proportion between these elements. Some productions emphasize reporting and direct observation, while others place greater emphasis on narrative structure, atmosphere, or the expressive possibilities of sound.

== History ==
The development of contemporary audio documentary is closely connected to the history of documentary broadcasting. Scholar Virginia Madsen traces the emergence of a documentary project in radio to at least the 1930s, when producers in several countries began developing forms that combined actuality, reporting, montage, narration, and creative uses of recorded sound.

Different broadcasting cultures developed different terminology and conventions. Terms such as radio documentary, feature, and related expressions have been used for factual audio productions with varying degrees of journalism, narration, dramatization, montage, and artistic experimentation.

During the late 20th and early 21st centuries, digital recording and distribution allowed documentary audio to circulate independently of traditional broadcasting institutions. The expansion of podcasting, particularly during the 2010s, provided new distribution channels and contributed to renewed interest in long-form narrative and documentary audio.

The second edition of Reality Radio: Telling True Stories in Sound also addresses the influence of podcasting on traditions of documentary radio and factual audio storytelling.

== Relationship to podcasting ==
A podcast and an audio documentary are not necessarily equivalent concepts. Podcasting primarily describes a means of producing and distributing episodic digital audio, and podcasts may include conversation, comedy, fiction, news, education, interviews, and numerous other formats.

An audio documentary, by contrast, refers primarily to a documentary approach to subject matter and the construction of a factual audio narrative. An audio documentary may therefore be distributed as a podcast, broadcast on radio, streamed online, or released through other audio platforms.

The growth of podcasting has influenced documentary audio aesthetics and production practices. McHugh has argued that podcasting has changed conventions of audio storytelling, including the relationship between hosts and listeners, narrative voice, production style, and the use of informal speech.

Not every non-fiction podcast is generally considered an audio documentary. A conversational interview podcast, for example, may concern real events without employing the documentary gathering, construction, and narrative organization associated with documentary audio.

== Radio documentary and radio feature ==
The radio documentary is one of the principal historical traditions from which contemporary audio documentary developed. Radio documentaries generally use factual material, recorded speech, actuality, narration, and other sonic elements to examine real subjects.

The term radio feature has also been widely used, particularly in European broadcasting traditions. The distinction between a radio documentary and a radio feature has never been universally agreed upon. In some traditions, feature has been associated with more literary, artistic, or formally experimental treatment of factual material, while elsewhere the terms overlap substantially.

Reková's study of European radio documentary treats radio documentary and radio feature as related but historically contested categories and examines debates concerning the distinction between them.

The broader term audio documentary can be used for documentary works that draw on these traditions but are not necessarily produced for terrestrial or broadcast radio.

== Documentary reality and construction ==
Like other forms of documentary, audio documentary involves a tension between factual material and creative construction. Recordings may originate in actual events or encounters, but producers select, edit, sequence, and contextualize those materials.

Sound design in documentary production does not necessarily function only as decoration. Changes in acoustic perspective, pacing, silence, juxtaposition, location sound, and vocal texture can provide narrative information and shape a listener's understanding of people, places, and events.

Questions of accuracy, representation, editing, reconstruction, and the relationship between documentary makers and their subjects are therefore central to the ethics and practice of audio documentary.

== See also ==
- Documentary
- Radio documentary
- Radio feature
- Podcast
- Narrative journalism
- Oral history
- Field recording
- Sound design
- Audio drama
