= Banner Theatre =

Banner Theatre's logo

Banner Theatre is a community theatre company based in Birmingham, England. The theatre was founded in 1974.

== History ==
Founded in 1974, the theatre works with marginalized and disadvantaged communities using a combination of documentary theatre, music and recorded voices. The aim of the company is to create issue-led productions based on real-life experiences and in support of disenfranchised sections of society, performing to community and trade union audiences in pubs, clubs and community centres and at rallies, festivals and conferences.

A founder member of the company was former BBC radio producer Charles Parker, who with Ewan MacColl and Peggy Seeger, created the radio ballads, award-winning musical documentaries broadcast by the BBC in the 1960s and now available via Listen Again on the BBC Radio 2 website. These have been a major influence on Banner's work and have recently informed development of a new form, the 'video ballad'.

Another founder member, and current artistic director, is Dave Rogers. He has written many of the company's songs and written or co-written most of their shows. Some 80 of his songs are published in Singing the Changes (Bread Books 2005) as well as social background and photographs from Banner's archives. Others have been released on Banner albums such as Black and White in the Red, Elixir of Life and Wild Geese.

Banners have been an important feature of the trade union movement, and provided the inspiration for the company's name and logo.

== Releases ==
=== Burning Issues ===
The touring version of this video ballad was created for the 20th anniversary of the 1984-5 Miners Strike, and this DVD marks the 25th anniversary.

=== "They Get Free Mobiles...Don't They?" ===
This video ballad debunks the media myths surrounding asylum seekers in Britain, and examines the role of big business in their exploitation. The stage version toured extensively in the Midlands during 2007 and was filmed in 2008.

=== Wild Geese ===
The Wild Geese DVD is a recording of a performance of a video ballad production created by Banner and filmed at Luton Library Theatre in 2006. Stories of migrant workers coming to the UK over many years, and the recent experience of refugees and asylum seekers, are told through video and archive film, with live music and song.

The Wild Geese CD was launched for the company's 30th anniversary and also contains songs from its 2005 production Migrant Voices.

=== Black and White in the Red ===
Released in 2002, this CD project was based at fire stations in Essex, Greater Manchester and the West Midlands. The album mixes jazz, folk and African/Caribbean music and song, with the words of black and white firefighters to expose racism in the British fire service.

=== Elixir of Life ===
Elixir of Life is a cassette produced by Banner Theatre in 1992 and released as a CD in 2005. The collection includes songs about the "classless society", Ireland, unemployment, the media and resistance. "Ewan's Song" celebrates the life of Ewan MacColl, who was a long-standing friend and supporter of Banner Theatre, and an inspiration to political artists and writers.
