= Inventions for Radio =

BBC radio programme by Delia Derbyshire and Barry Bermange

Inventions for Radio are a series of four radio features that first aired on BBC's Third Programme in 1964 and 1965. The broadcasts, titled The Dreams, Amor Dei, The After-Life and The Evenings of Certain Lives, were created by Delia Derbyshire of the BBC Radiophonic Workshop and Barry Bermange. Each of the individual broadcasts consists of a sound collage of electronic music and effects combined with spliced and remixed dialogue from interviews with everyday people. Each "invention" addressed an individual theme—dreams, the nature and existence of God, life after death, and ageing.

The soundscapes created by Derbyshire for Inventions for Radio have been described as "unsettling, dreamlike, and mesmerizing." Despite her role in composing the soundscapes, mixing, and editing the work, Derbyshire's contributions to Inventions for Radio were rarely acknowledged, instead being credited to Bermange and the Radiophonic Workshop.

== Background ==
Playwright Barry Bermange created a couple of radio programmes for the BBC in the early 1960s. He had experience conducting interviews through a programme about street entertainers, Living on a Rainbow and had previously interviewed people from the Hornsey Old People's Welfare Council for the 1962 programme Freedom Hours. Sound engineer Delia Derbyshire was hired by the BBC Radiophonic Workshop in 1962. In the summer of 1963, she was selected as the sound designer for the project. The first Invention for Radio was described as a "programme of actuality speech and electronic sound" and was tentatively titled Mid-Century Attitudes: Dreaming. The structure of the programme was envisioned as pairing spoken dialogue with musical phrases, using moments of silence for framing, in a piece that would become "more fragmented and contrapuntal towards the climax".

== Recording and production ==
Bermange conducted the interviews recorded for the Inventions for Radio, primarily through the Hornsey Old People's Welfare Council. The interviewees were everyday people who came from various socio-economic backgrounds. Bermange used a Fi-Cord tape recorder and instructed the interviewees to provide narratives in the first person.

Delia Derbyshire produced the electronic soundscape for the works. She used techniques from musique concrète and oscillator-generated sounds in the compositions. In addition to mixing and editing dialogue from the interviews, Derbyshire composed the musical interludes and shaped the compositions into a cohesive whole. The compositions she devised were a juxtaposition of oscillator-generated sounds, creating chords that were both dissonant and disturbing, with an effect described as "unsettling, dreamlike, and mesmerizing."

The first three inventions were produced by David Thomson. While Bermange had control over the direction of the projects, he would only give Derbyshire loose instructions as to how to construct the musical elements.

== The four inventions ==
=== The Dreams ===
The first invention, The Dreams, was broadcast on 5 January 1964 at 7:15 pm on the Third Programme. The snippets of dialogue taken from interviews concern the state of dreaming. They were divided into five movements, "Running", "Falling", "Land", "Sea", and "Colour".

The Dreams was re-aired on 15 January and was mostly well received in the newspapers, with a review in The Guardian stating:

"The tapes were blended with admirable softness and skill, so that the bemused, repetitive, floating phrases did now and then achieve the numbness of a dream; and the Radiophonic Workshop put in only the discreetest accompaniment. It was ingenious, rather than inspired; but it did arrest the ear, and force recognition at a far more intimate level that radio usually disturbs."

Another review in The Northern Echo also offered praise. However, half of the responses to an Audience Research Report by the BBC were "singularly unenthusiastic". The Dreams also scored lower on the BBC's appreciation index than previous radio ballads and productions by the Radiophonic Workshop.

=== Amor Dei ===
The second invention, entitled Amor Dei, was first broadcast on 16 November 1964. The dialogue from the interviews concerns the nature and existence of God. Amor Dei is divided into four movements. The first movement concerns the interviewees' impressions of the nature of God while the second explores perceptions and manifestations of God in their lives. The third movement approaches the topic from an atheistic perspective and the fourth starts with sentiments of pity and frustration directed towards non-believers before shifting its focus to prayer. For this composition, Derbyshire used a looped recording of a chanting voice.

=== The After-Life ===
The third invention, The After-Life, was broadcast on 1 April 1965. The interviews concerned life after death. The radio broadcast met with some unfavourable reviews from listeners, with one person relating that "the accents, the phraseology, the stumblings, the dropped “g” and the disjointed replies were most displeasing." Others considered the production a "ghastly noise" with weird electronic effects "like somebody moaning into a watering-can".

=== The Evenings of Certain Lives ===
The fourth invention, The Evenings of Certain Lives, was broadcast on 9 September 1965. The interviews concern the experience of ageing.

== Reception and legacy ==
British radio producer Piers Plowright described Inventions for Radio as having pioneered a form of "poetic realism". Brian Hodgson of the BBC Radiophonic Workshop, said that Inventions captured Derbyshire "at her elegant best". Sound engineer Dick Mills said that "if the Doctor Who theme was 'the House Speciality' then the Inventions for Radio were her 'Main Courses'". Following the broadcasts, the BBC received complaints from listeners about the "uneducated" or "harsh" accents of the people who were interviewed. One reviewer was dismayed that "'inane... nonentities' were allowed to express their thoughts about such profound subjects on national radio". The programmes were broadcast during a time in British radio history when socio-economic diversity and working-class voices in particular received little on-air representation and were often clichéd. Many of the complaints about the broadcast centred on the voices and opinions of the interviewees, perhaps owing in part to the elitist attitudes of the Third Programme's audience.

The first three inventions were rebroadcast in 1977 on BBC Radio 4. As well as being made available online, Inventions for Radio was released with bonus tracks as a 6-LP box set 8 December 2023. It was also released as a 6-CD set on 20 April 2024.

== Lack of credit for Derbyshire ==
While Derbyshire designed the soundscape and music for Inventions for Radio, and was responsible for the editing, mixing, and likely much of the creative design, her role was often completely unacknowledged. Due to a BBC policy of the 1960s, employees from the Radiophonic Workshop were not given individual credit for their creations. The works were introduced as "an invention for radio by Barry Bermange in conjunction with the BBC Radiophonic Workshop". In interviews, Bermange would not mention Derbyshire's name and seemed to claim credit for the music, saying in one instance, "I'm at the controls of the music, I can control the volume of the music. I can bring in the sounds I want to bring in." Throughout the 1970s and 1980s, Derbyshire was not mentioned in discussions of Inventions for Radio. According to BBC Radiophonic Workshop's Hodgson, "Derbyshire was deeply upset in later life that she had no copyright on the 'Inventions' and believed Bermange had taken her copyright away." Derbyshire was credited alongside Bermange and the Radiophonic Workshop on the 2023 box set release.

== Box set release ==
Inventions for Radio

Box set by Barry Bermange, Delia Derbyshire, and the BBC Radiophonic Workshop
- Released: 8 December 2023
- Label: Silva Screen
- Producer: Mark Ayres

BBC Radiophonic Workshop chronology
| Doctor Who: Revenge of the Cybermen (2023) | Inventions for Radio (2023) | Doctor Who: Timelash (2026) |

All four inventions, along with related and bonus material, were released as a 6-LP box set 8 December 2023 by Silva Screen. It was reissued on six CDs as part of Record Store Day 20 April 2024.

=== Track listing ===
The Dreams Side 1
| No. | Title | Length |
|---|---|---|
| 1. | "Opening Announcement" | 1:36 |
| 2. | "Running Away" | 6:37 |
| 3. | "Falling" | 8:03 |
| 4. | "Landscape" | 6:30 |

Side 2
| No. | Title | Length |
|---|---|---|
| 1. | "Underwater" | 8:56 |
| 2. | "Colour" | 8:42 |
| 3. | "Closing Announcement" | 0:14 |

Amor Dei Side 1
| No. | Title | Length |
|---|---|---|
| 1. | "Opening Announcement" | 0:43 |
| 2. | "Amor Dei - Movement 1" | 8:02 |
| 3. | "Amor Dei - Movement 2" | 9:08 |
| 4. | "Amor Dei - Movement 3a" | 5:46 |

Side 2
| No. | Title | Length |
|---|---|---|
| 1. | "Amor Dei - Movement 3b" | 9:01 |
| 2. | "Amor Dei - Movement 4" | 14:30 |
| 3. | "Closing Announcement" | 0:11 |

The After-Life Side 1
| No. | Title | Length |
|---|---|---|
| 1. | "Opening Announcement" | 0:56 |
| 2. | "The After-Life Movement 1" | 7:58 |
| 3. | "The After-Life Movement 2" | 11:36 |

Side 2
| No. | Title | Length |
|---|---|---|
| 1. | "The After-Life Movement 3" | 10:49 |
| 2. | "The After-Life Movement 4" | 10:42 |
| 3. | "Closing Announcement" | 0:14 |

The Evening Of Certain Lives Side 1
| No. | Title | Length |
|---|---|---|
| 1. | "Opening Announcement" | 1:20 |
| 2. | "Moving" | 8:49 |
| 3. | "Seeing" | 8:31 |
| 4. | "Hearing [Start]" | 3:44 |

Side 2
| No. | Title | Length |
|---|---|---|
| 1. | "Hearing [Conclusion]" | 3:35 |
| 2. | "Time" | 10:14 |
| 3. | "Then And Now" | 8:03 |
| 4. | "Closing Announcement" | 0:17 |

Related And Bonus Material (Disk 1) Side 1
| No. | Title | Length |
|---|---|---|
| 1. | "The Dreams - Opening Music" | 1:02 |
| 2. | "The Dreams (From The Cloud)" | 6:38 |
| 3. | "Falling (Music Track)" | 3:54 |
| 4. | "Underwater (Music Track)" | 2:45 |
| 5. | "Amor Dei Background 1" | 3:40 |

Side 2
| No. | Title | Length |
|---|---|---|
| 1. | "Amor Dei Background 2" | 5:08 |
| 2. | "Amor Dei Background 2 (High)" | 3:03 |
| 3. | "Amor Dei Background 3" | 2:34 |
| 4. | "Amor Dei Background 4 (Rorate Caeli Desuper)" | 2:03 |
| 5. | "Atheism Music (From Poets In Prison)" | 5:08 |

Related And Bonus Material (Disk 2) Side 1
| No. | Title | Length |
|---|---|---|
| 1. | "Amor Dei Background 1 (repurposed for Tutankhamun's Egypt)" | 6:29 |
| 2. | "Christmas Music - Plainsong Aniphons (Unacc.) - Rorate Caeli Desuper" | 2:27 |
| 3. | "A Doorway Into A New Life" | 0:46 |
| 4. | "The Cord That Binds" | 4:01 |
| 5. | "Heavenly Backgrounds 1" | 2:45 |
| 6. | "Heavenly Backgrounds 2" | 3:27 |
| 7. | "Heavenly Backgrounds 3" | 3:07 |

Side 2
| No. | Title | Length |
|---|---|---|
| 1. | "Heavenly Backgrounds 4" | 1:20 |
| 2. | "Heavenly Backgrounds 5" | 2:17 |
| 3. | "Heavenly Backgrounds 6" | 1:42 |
| 4. | "Heavenly Backgrounds 7" | 3:19 |
| 5. | "Heavenly Backgrounds 8" | 2:34 |
| 6. | "The Delian Mode (Original Full Length Version)" | 8:05 |
| 7. | "The Dreams, 1977 Repeat Closing Announcement" | 0:25 |

== See also ==
- The Delian Mode
