= No Feeling Is Final =

Podcast produced by the ABC

Publication
- Provider: Australian Broadcasting Corporation

Related
- Website: www.abc.net.au/radio/programs/no-feeling-is-final

No Feeling Is Final is a 2018 podcast produced by Australian Broadcasting Corporation and hosted by Honor Eastly.

== Background ==
The podcast is produced by Australian Broadcasting Corporation. The podcast is hosted by Honor Eastly. The show is written by Honor Eastly with co-writing from Graham Panther. It is produced by Alice Moldovan. Russell Stapleton is the sound engineer for the show, and the executive producer is Joel Werner. The podcast is six episodes long with each episode running about 30 minutes in length. The podcast consists of audio diaries that Eastly recorded over a five year period. The podcast discusses Eastly's struggles with anxiety, self-harm, and suicidal ideation. The podcast explores these serious and difficult topics with whimsy and hopefulness. Eastly's inner thoughts are represented by what she calls "The Voice". Eastly previously hosted two other podcasts called Being Honest with My Ex and Starving Artist. Fiona Sturges wrote in the Financial Times that "The sound design is terrific: experimental, clever, discreet." The show was included on The Atlantic's list of best podcasts of 2018 and The Verge's list of favorite podcasts of 2019. The show won the Directors' Choice award at the 2019 Third Coast International Audio Festival. Following the podcast, Eastly and Panther continued their mental health advocacy through The Big Feels Club, a community offering peer support for people on the 'long term mental health path'.
