= Radio documentary =

Radio format devoted to non-fiction narratives

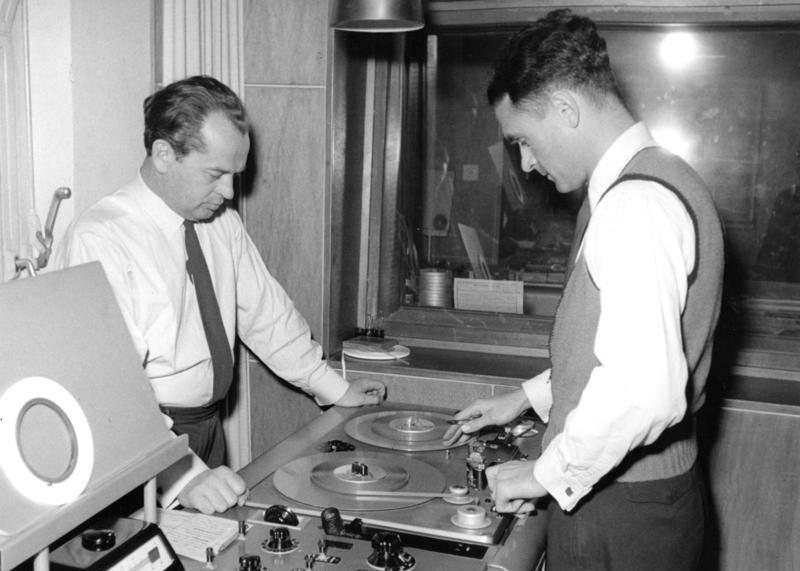
Recording studio in Germany (WDR, 1954)

A radio documentary is a spoken word radio format devoted to non-fiction narrative. It is broadcast on radio as well as distributed through media such as tape, CD, and podcast. A radio documentary, or feature, covers a topic in depth from one or more perspectives, often featuring interviews, commentary, and sound pictures. A radio feature may include original music compositions and creative sound design or can resemble traditional journalistic radio reporting, but cover an issue in greater depth.

== History ==
=== Origins of Radio Documentary in America ===
The early stages of fiction audio storytelling did not entirely resemble what would later be called radio documentaries. In the 1930s, with radio stations like WNYC entering the airspace, reporters documented real people and real-life scenarios through short on-the-ground interviews rather than dramatization. Other notable documentary broadcasts include unrefined one-shot audio recordings of events, such as the Hindenburg disaster in 1937. By 1939, CBS responded to growing anxieties about immigration in the U.S. with a six-month series, titled "Americans All...Immigrants All," which highlighted the stories of immigrant communities.

The lack of documentary-style reporting in this era can be attributed, in part, to technological limitations; recording equipment was not easily portable.

=== 1940s in American Radio Documentary ===
An important moment in the establishment of the radio documentary as a widely used and discussed format is the expansion of portable audio recording devices. In 1945, sound archivist and radio producer, Tony Schwartz began to use portable audio recording equipment to collect the sounds of his neighborhood in New York City to share on his WNYC radio show; his features ran for 30 years and grew to include the sounds of daily life recorded by and mailed to him from people around the world. This style of sharing true-life sound bytes would remain in public radio documentary.

In 1946, one of the most pivotal developments in the spread and stylization of radio documentary was the creation of the CBS Documentary Unit. It was the first sector of a major media network dedicated to this format of radio. The unit was "'devoted exclusively to the production of programs dealing with major domestic and international issues and involving extraordinary research and preparation'". Not only did the content deviate from programming that favors advertisers, the style deviated from the standard, creating a well-known format. The style of reporting for the CBS features was adopted and melded by ABC and NBC networks. The format included extensive interviews to gain multiple perspectives on an issue, adherence to journalistic ethics, and often a call to action; the programming was usually released as multiple segments and at peak times. Examples of these first documentary projects include CBS' 1946 war feature, The Empty Noose, and ABC's 1949 program, V.D., A Conspiracy of Silence, addressing the lack of public attention to venereal disease.

=== 1970s in American Radio Documentary ===
With the founding of National Public Radio in 1971, radio documentary began shifting again due to non-commercial educational media. For a short time, programs such as All Things Considered explored creative styles of presenting non-fiction by deviating from now-traditional styles of radio documentary by hiring reporters outside of the radio sphere.

=== 1990s-present in American Radio Documentary ===
Important shifts in technology have allowed radio documentary to travel beyond analog. With the advent of podcasting and internet radio, the FCC provides no guidelines for these media. Programs are allowed to skirt FCC regulation, marking yet another shift in the content and style of documentary programming. Current features that exemplify the new possibilities opened by podcasting include the often gritty subject matter of Love + Radio and the critical success of the podcast Serial due to the ability of listeners across the globe to access the content for free.

== Quotes ==
At its best, radio combines the power and immediacy of great documentary films with the intimacy and poetry of a New Yorker-style magazine piece.

— Columbia University Graduate School of Journalism, web.jrn.columbia.edu

Staring red-eyed at the mirror in front of me, having spent another day and half of the night with my computer, I ask myself fundamental questions: Why radio? Why documentary? Answer: No other medium can provide me with more freedom of creation and investigation. It meets my urgent interest in reality and the desire for a 'musical' expression. The material (der Werkstoff) is sound. And sound always surrounds us. And: I'm not so much interested in the description of stable situations, but in processes. Our medium is not space, but time; our stories are not glued to the ground, but have motion, life ... That's why!

— Helmut Kopetzky, German author, Self-portrait

So what is a radio feature? Technically speaking, it is a 30- to 60-minute, elaborate broadcast from a semantic field related to a radio drama, that can contain all the elements from original sound (interviews) and author texts (epic or scenic type) to noise and music.

— Patrick Conley, 60 Years of Radio Feature in Germany, 2007

== Radio documentary in developing nations ==
There has been interest in the field of radio documentaries, particularly in developing nations such as India, Iran, South Korea and Malaysia. In India, radio documentary is gaining in popularity due to their flexibility, efficiency and accessibility to the masses. Producers such as Chitra Narain and Danish Iqbal have been accredited with its revival and popularity in the region. Danish Iqbal who is primarily a drama producer combined the elements of dramatic narrative to produce radio documentaries. His documentary "Yeh Rishta Kya Kehlata Hai" is considered a classic for the use of effective narrative and ambient sounds. This documentary presents an account of unseen bridges between a Kashmiri Shikarah Wala and his auto rickshaw driver friend in Delhi. Although they never met each other, their unseen bond is the subject of this documentary which transcends the barriers of political, religious and regional prejudices.

Because both Chitra and Danish had a long tenure at Delhi and had a creative collaboration with many media institutes, their influence is seminal in shaping the thinking of many of their students and co-workers. Danish won twice the prestigious Public Service Broadcasting Award for his documentaries.

== Notable feature makers ==
- Jay Allison
- Eurydice Aroney
- Tony Barrell
- Greg Barron
- Emil Benčík
- Alex Blumberg
- Peter Leonhard Braun
- Kyla Brettle
- Edwin Brys
- Bill Bunbury
- Scott Carrier
- Alex Chadwick
- Bill Drake
- Stephen Erickson
- Joe Frank
- Laurence Gilliam
- John Gilliland
- Ira Glass (and This American Life)
- Glenn Gould (The Solitude Trilogy)
- David Gutnick (Commonwealth Prize, United Nations Broadcast Award etc)
- Alan Hall
- Berit Hedemann (Prix Europa Yleisradio 1997 and 1998)
- David Isay
- Malta Jasperson
- Lisbeth Jessen
- Ronan Kelly
- Kitchen Sisters
- Brigitte Kirilow
- Helmut Kopetzky
- Robert Krulwich
- Christian Lerch
- Bill Lichtenstein
- Klaus Lindemann
- Bosse Lindquist (Prix Futura/Prix Europa 1995, and others)
- Susan Marling
- Ewan MacColl
- Siobhan McHugh
- Kaye Mortley
- Pete Myers
- Charles Parker
- Piers Plowright
- Lorenz Rollhäuser (Prix Europa 2008)
- Steve Rowland
- Nancy Updike
- China Walcott
