= Affairs of the Mind =

Radio documentary by Kyla Brettle

Affairs of the Mind is a radio documentary made by Melbourne, Australia, audio producer Kyla Brettle.

The piece is a personal and confronting story exploring the nature of jealousy and the perimeters of infidelity. In an observational style we follow private detective Steve Murray through a marital investigation and track his client's transition from doubt to certainty. Along the way we examine why Steve himself is drawn to this line of work and what his client is really getting for her money.

Affairs Of The Mind was first broadcast on ABC Radio National as part of the Radio Eye series on 21 July 2001 and subsequently by Radio New Zealand National on 29 June 2003 as well as by Chicago Public Radio.

Brettle won the Best New Artist Award for the piece at the 2002 Third Coast International Audio Festival.
