= The Penguin Guide to Blues Recordings =

2006 book by Chris Smith

- The cover of The Penguin Guide to Blues Recordings.
- Author: Tony Russell; Chris Smith
- Language: English
- Series: Penguin Guide
- Subject: Blues
- Genre: Non-fiction; Encyclopedic; Reference
- Publisher: Penguin Books
- Publication date: October 31, 2006
- Media type: Paperback
- Pages: 944
- ISBN: 0-14-051384-1
- OCLC: 65467552

The Penguin Guide to Blues Recordings is an encyclopedia of blues music albums released on CD.

== Content ==
The book was released on 31 October 2006 and was written by Tony Russell and Chris Smith, with contributions by Neil Slaven, Ricky Russell and Joe Faulkner. Russell in particular is known as a musical historian, working closely with programmes presented on BBC Radio, as well as documentaries on the blues.

In the book, artists are set up alphabetically and include short (usually one paragraph) biographies before showing a complete listing of their discography. Each album includes title, a rating out of four stars, label, musicians on the album, month and year of recording, and finally a review of varying length.

== See also ==
- The Penguin Guide to Jazz
