= Laurence Gilliam =

British radio producer (1907–1964)

Laurence Duval Gilliam, OBE (4 March 1907 – 15 November 1964) was a BBC radio producer.

Gilliam worked with the Gramophone Company, before being transferred to the BBC drama department in 1933, where he was responsible for features. At the end of World War II he was appointed OBE for his outstanding programmes.

== Early life ==
Laurence Duval Gilliam was born on 4 March 1907 in Fulham, London, the younger son of Ernest William Gilliam (d. 1943), a businessman, and his wife, Beatrice Bishop (d. 1946). He was educated at the City of London School (1918–25) and Peterhouse, Cambridge (1925–28).

Laurence Gilliam worked first with the Gramophone Company in various capacities, and later as a freelance journalist, actor, and producer, before joining the editorial staff of the Radio Times in 1932.

== BBC Features ==
Gilliam transferred to the BBC drama department in 1933, where he worked on the development of special feature programmes which wove sound, words, and music together to create an aural picture. From 1933 until the end of his life he was responsible for the world-wide Christmas Day programmes that preceded the monarch's address. These programmes were the BBC's technically most complicated assignment, linking the Commonwealth outposts with Broadcasting House in London via elaborate world-wide link-ups. Another notable example of Gilliam's early technical ambition was ′Opping 'Oliday—a "sound picture" of hop picking in Kent—which he produced in 1934 using the newly established mobile recording van. Val Gielgud, head of drama, transferred responsibility for features to Gilliam in May 1936, though features really came into their own during the Second World War.

In 1940 Gilliam married Marianne Helweg (1914–1976), a Dane whose father, Jacob Helweg, had immigrated to Britain in the 1920s to take up a lecturing position at the University of London. The couple met at the BBC, where Marianne had been a plays reader. She and Laurence had three sons and one daughter. They lived in Highgate, Middlesex, until the marriage was dissolved in 1952, when Marianne moved in with the Northern Irish poet Bertie (W. R.) Rodgers, who worked for Gilliam.

Gilliam saw the possibilities for the medium of radio to reflect the reality of war. In his major topical series The Shadow of the Swastika, which documented the rise of Nazism, Gilliam demonstrated the power of the factual documentary for propaganda purposes and offered the first challenging piece of work from the BBC since the outbreak of war. Gilliam had a natural sympathy for the journalistic approach to broadcasting, and his war work reflected these instincts. As one of the two editors (with Donald Boyd) of War Report, he helped to create a revolutionary technique on which all news reporting has since been based, taking the microphone to the fighting line to report back to the people at home nightly, in record time. In recognition of this outstanding war record, features became a separate department at the end of the war in 1945, with Laurence Gilliam as its head, and Gilliam himself was appointed OBE.

Throughout the post-war period, termed the ‘golden age of radio’, Gilliam recruited and encouraged poets and writers to contribute work for the BBC features department. Such writers included Louis MacNeice, Douglas Cleverdon, Leonard Cottrell, Jennifer Wayne, Christopher Sykes, W. R. Rodgers, Francis Dillon, Nesta Pain, Wynford Vaughan Thomas, Alan Burgess, and D. G. Bridson.

He maintained strongly that the feature was the one unique form that radio had achieved in its short history; and it was largely due to him that features came to stand for so much that was vital, contemporary, experimental, and above all ‘pure radio’. In his book BBC Features, edited by Gilliam, published by Evans Brothers in 1950, Gilliam described a Feature Programme as "in broadcasting, the term has come to signify a wide range of programme items, usually factual and documentary, presented by a variety of techniques, but mostly making use of edited actuality. The essential quality of the feature programme is that it should be the expression of one mind, whatever technique it uses".

In the early 1960s Gilliam still maintained his faith in radio, but as the end of the features department was being discussed, his health was deteriorating. Laurence Gilliam died of cancer of the kidneys on 15 November 1964 in St Andrew's Hospital, Dollis Hill, Middlesex, where he was convalescing after an operation.

== Works ==
- B.B.C. Features. London: Evans Bros., 1950.
- Harry Hopeful, 1936; introduced by Frank Nicholls, produced by D.G.Bridson
- Christmas Day Programme, 1934 to 1956; produced by Laurence Gilliam
- The Shadow of the Swastika, 1939; produced by Laurence Gilliam, Marius Goring as Hitler, written by A. L. Lloyd, Igor Vinogradoff, music by Walter Goehr
- Junction X, 1944; written & produced Cecil McGivern, music by Walter Goehr
- The Dark Tower, 1945; written and produced by Louis MacNeice, music by Benjamin Britten
- Irish Literary Portraits, 1948 to 1965; produced by W. R. Rodgers
- Under Milk Wood, 1954; by Dylan Thomas, produced by Douglas Cleveland, performed by Richard Burton, music by Daniel Jones
- Flies So Called; 1958; written and produced by Nesta Pain, music by Antony Hopkins
- The Way We Live Now; 1962, introduced by Rene Cutforth, produced by Francis Dillon
- One Eye Wild, 1961; written and produced by Louis MacNeice
- The Big Hewer, 1961; by Ewan MacColl and Peggy Seeger, produced by Charles Parker
