= George Newson =

English composer and pianist (1932–2024)

George Newson (27 July 1932 – 8 March 2024) was an English composer and pianist who made important contributions to British electronic and avant garde music during the 1960s and 1970s. He subsequently composed large and small-scale works in many musical forms and styles, from songs and chamber music to choral works and opera. As a photographer, Newson took portraits of many of his composer contemporaries.

== Education ==
Born in Shadwell, East London, Newson began studying piano at the age of 14 when he won a scholarship to the Blackheath Conservatoire of Music (1947–9). He started to play in modern jazz bands and to compose, while continuing his studies part time at Morley College (1950–53) with Peter Racine Fricker and Iain Hamilton. His first publicly performed work was the Octet for wind of 1951, which shows the influence of the modern jazz bands the composer was playing with at the time.

In 1955, he won a further scholarship to the Royal Academy of Music under Alan Bush and Howard Ferguson, where he also made contact with contemporaries such as Harrison Birtwistle and Hugh Wood. In post-graduate studies at Dartington and Darmstadt in the late 1950s he was influenced by radical figures such as Elliott Carter, Luciano Berio, Bruno Maderna and Luigi Nono. From 1959 he worked as a music teacher in London, at Twickenham Technical College and Peckham Manor School.

== Composition ==
Electronic compositions followed in the 1960s, first with the BBC Radiophonic Workshop, where he worked with Delia Derbyshire and produced the music for an experimental drama, The Man Who Collected Sounds, with radio producer Douglas Cleverdon. Derbyshire became a lifelong friend. In 1967 he embarked on a three-month journey across the US, stopping to work at various music studios, including Trumansburg, New York with Robert Moog and the University of Urbana. He also met John Cage during the trip. Back in the UK he produced his tape composition Silent Spring, inspired by Rachel Carson's book and using birdsong recorded at London Zoo. It was premiered at the Queen Elizabeth Hall Redcliffe Concert on 15 January 1968 - one of the earliest concerts of electronic music by British composers. Other electronic pieces from this period include Canto II for clarinet and tape at RAI, Milan and Genus II at the University of Utrecht.

Newson's abstract electronic works of the 1960s evolved towards an avant-garde, post-modern style, incorporating radical collage and theatrical elements, although the basis of his music is often tonal, melodic and lyrical. In 1971 came his highest profile commission, by the BBC's William Glock. The staged oratorio Arena was written for the Proms, performed in the Roundhouse and conducted by Pierre Boulez, with Cleo Laine as soloist and The King's Singers. Using a collage of diverse vocal, textual, dramatic and political elements, the piece shows the influence of Berio's Sinfonia of 1968. Another BBC commission followed in 1972: Praise to the Air for chorus and instrumental ensemble, setting poetry by George MacBeth.

== Later career ==
During the 1970s Newson was appointed Cramb Research Fellow at Glasgow University and Composer-in-Residence at Queen's University, Belfast. In 1984 he was invited by Boulez to work at IRCAM in Paris. The Ensemble intercontemporain, commissioned him to compose I Will Encircle the Sun (Aphelion/Perihelion), which they performed in 1989.

Newson continued to compose. His later work included the one act opera Mrs Fraser’s Frenzy, written for the Canterbury and Cheltenham Festivals in 1994, a percussion concerto Both Arms for Evelyn Glennie in 2002, and the piano trio Cantiga (2004), performed at the Rye Festival. There are few commercial recordings of his music but some excerpts are available on SoundCloud.

== Photography ==
Newson was also known for his photography, particularly for his portraits of composers. There are two self-portraits at the National Gallery in London, and more than 50 others, including portraits of David Bedford, Richard Rodney Bennett, Harrison Birtwistle, Alexander Goehr, Hans Keller, Nicholas Maw, Andrzej Panufnik and Priaulx Rainier.

== Personal life and death ==
Newson married his wife June Gould in 1951: she worked in an art gallery in Rye, East Sussex. There were five children. In later life they lived in the village of Stone in Oxney in Kent, near the border of East Sussex. Newson was an amateur ornithologist, something celebrated in Michael Longley's poem Stone-in-Oxney, which is dedicated to Newson. Longley's poem 'Nightingale' was written in memory of the composer's wife, June, who died in 2019. Newson died at his home on 8 March 2024, at the age of 91.

== Selected works ==
(see also: List of works, British Music Collection)

- Arena (1971) for jazz singer, choir, raconteur, soprano saxophone and orchestra
- Cantiga (2004), piano trio
- Circle (1985), song cycle for soprano and ensemble, text Peter Porter
- Concerto for Percussion (Both Arms) (2002), commissioned by Evelyn Glennie, Canterbury Festival
- Concerto for two violins (1994), commissioned by the Sofia Philharmonic Orchestra, UK premiere 2006
- The Dead, opera, text by Paul Muldoon, based on the story by James Joyce.
- From the New Divan for viola, choir and orchestra (published Lengnick)
- The General (1980), music theatre for actors and brass band, text Alan Sillitoe
- Mrs Fraser’s Frenzy (1994), one act opera
- The Night Walk (1968), chorus and orchestra
- Oh My America (1985), chorus, narrator and orchestra
- Praise to the Air (1972), chorus and orchestra
- Silent Spring, (1968), electronics (also version for voice, children's choir and ensemble)
- Songs for the Turning Year (1993), Proms commission
- Sonograms 1 & 11 (1995) for Orchestre National de Lille
- String Quartet No 1 (1958)
- String Quartet No 2
- Symphony No 2, Even to the Edge of Doom (1976)
- Third Time (1975) for orchestra
- Three Interiors (1958), song cycle for soprano, wind quintet and double bass, words Leonard Smith
- Twenty-seven Days for orchestra (fp. Royal Festival Hall, 24 May 1970)
- Two Elegies and a Prayer (2021), for two voices and flute, settings of Michael Longley and Fleur Adcock
- Valentine (1975), collage of words and music, soprano, speaker and ensemble
- Wind Quintet (1964)
- The Winter’s Tale (1998), opera
