= The Delian Mode =

- Directed by: Kara Blake
- Written by: Kara Blake
- Produced by: Kara Blake; Marie-Josée Saint-Pierre
- Starring: Delia Derbyshire
- Cinematography: Kara Blake; Philippe Blanchard
- Production company: Philtre Films
- Release date: May 8, 2009 (Hot Docs)
- Running time: 25 minutes
- Country: Canada
- Language: English

The Delian Mode is a 2009 Canadian short documentary film directed, written and produced by Kara Blake, and made in association with the National Film Board of Canada.

The film is a profile of the British composer Delia Derbyshire (1937–2001), best known for arranging the theme music to the BBC series Doctor Who. The film takes its name from the title of a piece of incidental music Derbyshire wrote in the 1960s.

== Accolades ==
The film premiered at the Hot Docs Canadian International Documentary Festival, where it won the award for Best Short Documentary. In 2010 it won the Best Short Documentary Film award at the 30th Genie Awards.

== See also ==
- Inventions for Radio
