= Greg Barron =

American radio and television journalist

Greg R. Barron
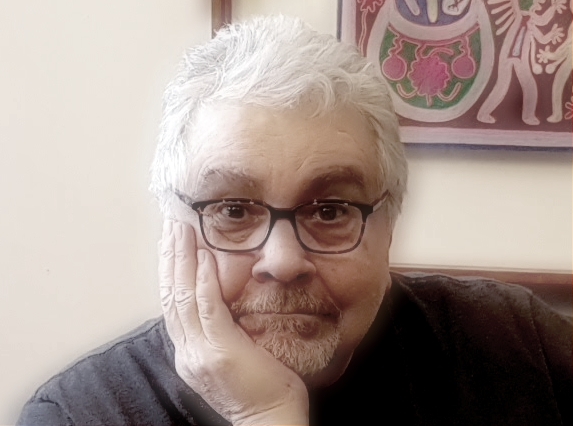
- Greg R. Barron, circa 2021
- Born: Greg Rowe Barron; June 14, 1946 (age 80); Los Angeles
- Education: California State University, Los Angeles
- Occupations: Radio and Television Journalist, Audio Documentary Feature Producer, Communications Consultant
- Years active: 1968 - present
- Notable work: The Prairie Was Quiet, The Way to 8-A, Trampled Grass
- Awards: Two George Foster Peabody Awards (see full awards list)
- Website: http://www.sounddawg.net

Greg Rowe Barron (born June 14, 1946) is an American radio and television journalist, producer and communications executive. His early radio feature work influenced public radio storytelling in the United States and how sound is used in documentary storytelling production. Described by Variety in 1981 as "one of the most renowned creators of radio documentaries in the nation", his work as a producer for Minnesota Public Radio between 1972 and 1980 was recognized by dozens of regional and national journalism awards and he was a pioneering advocate of the use of high-fidelity stereophonic sound as an integral element of radio journalism.

== Education and early career ==
Barron is a graduate of Los Angeles' Benjamin Franklin High School. He studied broadcast production, journalism, and speech arts at Los Angeles City College and California State University, Los Angeles. He started his broadcasting career at KVWM-AM, a small radio station in Show Low, Arizona. Following his return to Los Angeles, he became a reporter, producer and, at age 21, public affairs director of KPFK-FM the Pacifica Radio public radio station in North Hollywood, California. While there, he co-developed, and became editor-in-chief of a then-groundbreaking magazine-style public affairs program—P.M. Journal. The program may have been the first major-market public radio news and public affairs "magazine" program broadcast in the United States: It was developed and launched in 1970 and was modeled after CBS’ 60 Minutes, the first U.S. television news magazine, which debuted in September 1968. P.M. Journal preceded by at least one year the May 1971 launch of National Public Radio's (NPR) magazine news program All Things Considered. While at KPFK, he began his documentary production career with Soledad: The Prison, which won the Radio & Television News Association of Southern California's Golden Mike Award.

== News and feature work at MPR ==
In 1972 he joined Saint Paul, Minnesota-based Minnesota Public Radio (MPR), where he served as a news reporter, documentary producer and senior producer of MPR's regional edition of "All Things Considered". His reports were regularly carried on National Public Radio and the Canadian Broadcasting Corporation (CBC Radio) and his news reporting and documentary feature productions earned nearly three dozen awards., including two Corporation for Public Broadcasting Awards and two George Foster Peabody Awards.

His most widely acclaimed work was the 1978 Peabody Award-winning The Prairie Was Quiet, an "acoustic portrait" exploring the evolution of the American Prairie. The program was later translated and adapted for audiences in Europe and in Australia. His documentary feature The Way to 8-A won a second Peabody Award in 1980.

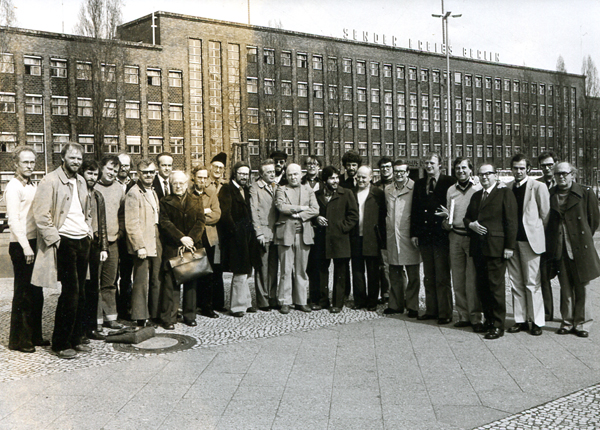
IFC "Class of 1977" in Berlin at Sender Freies Berlin Studios. Barron, front row, right of center.

The acclaim was followed by a Fellowship from the Corporation for Public Broadcasting and a grant award to study advanced audio production techniques in Berlin at Sender Freies Berlin (Free Berlin Radio), the leading European producer of acoustic documentary features. Barron was one of the first American producers to attend (1977, 1980) the invitation-only "International Feature Conference," an annual gathering of some of the most accomplished radio documentary/feature producers in the world. Organized and hosted by Peter Leonhard Braun, a long-standing, internationally recognized leader of radio acoustic feature production. The conference brought producers together in an effort to enhance the state of the art of feature production worldwide.

In 2015, MPR digitized his documentary works and has assembled an online streaming "Greg Barron Special Collection".

In 2021, MPR published Signal Strength, a book documenting the 50-year history of the network, in which it referred to Barron as a "legendary documentarian" producing "work of unrivaled insight and craft".

== Later career ==
In 1981, Barron began a career in marketing communications working first with Hill and Knowlton public relations as a media relations executive, followed by a brief tenure as a documentary producer for The Moore Report, an award-winning documentary unit at the CBS owned-and-operated WCCO-TV in Minneapolis. In 1983, he founded G.R. Barron and Company, a Twin Cities, Minnesota-based public relations and marketing communications agency. In 1998, he left the agency business to continue his career as a communications executive in the corporate world. Barron is now a retired marketing consultant and is exploring the production of short-form acoustic storytelling at his website http://www.sounddawg.net, where he maintains a historical review of and links to legacy and current public radio storytelling works. His recent productions include Follow the Moon, a first-hand re-telling of the horrors experienced by three Cambodians, then children, under the Khmer Rouge "killing fields". Published on sounddawg.net it was broadcast by the Minnesota Public Radio network and translated by the Voice of America into the Khmer language for transmission in Southeast Asia

== Awards ==
See also "Complete awards list"

The Way to 8-A

• George Foster Peabody Award, 1980 • Robert f. Kennedy Journalism Award, 1980 • The Major Armstrong Award Certificate of Merit 1980 • Northwest Broadcast News Association, second place, 1980

Power on the Line

• United Press International Award • The Major Armstrong Award Certificate of Merit • Minnesota Page One Award

The Prairie Was Quiet

• George Foster Peabody Award, 1978 • Northwest Broadcast News Association Award, 1978 • The Ohio State Award, 1978, Institute for Education, Ohio State University • The Major Armstrong Award Certificate of Merit, 1978 • The Clarion Award, 1978

Ashes to Ashes, Dust to Dust

• The Ohio State Award, 1977 • Corporation for Public Broadcasting Honorable Mention, 1977 • The Major Armstrong Award Certificate of Merit, National Radio Broadcasters/Columbia University — for excellence and originality in programming • National Headliner Award, 1977 • Broadcast Media Award, California State University, S.F., 1977

A Matter of Life and Death

• The Major Armstrong Award, Columbia University, 1976 • Corporation for Public Broadcasting Award, 1976 Environmental Reporting • Environmental Quality Award, U.S. Environmental Protection Agency for excellence in reporting environmental issues. 1975

In Search of a Better Life

• Broadcast Media Award, 1975 • Corporation for Public Broadcasting Award, 1975

Two Cops in the City

• The Ohio State Award, 1974

Bail in America: Freedom for a Price

• American Bar Association Certificate of Merit, 1974 • Corporation for Public Broadcasting Award, 1973 • Northwest Broadcast News Association Award, 1973

A Story About Dogs

• 1973 Broadcast Media Award - School of Telecommunications, California State University, San Francisco
