= Sisters with Transistors =

2020 film, directed by Lisa Rovner

- Directed by: Lisa Rovner
- Produced by: Anna Vaney; Marcus Werner Hed
- Starring: Maryanne Amacher, Bebe Barron, Suzanne Ciani, Delia Derbyshire, Pauline Oliveros, Daphne Oram, Éliane Radigue, Clara Rockmore, Wendy Carlos and Laurie Spiegel
- Cinematography: Bill Kirstein
- Music by: Quinn Tsan, Alexander Babbitt
- Distributed by: Metrograph Pictures
- Release date: 17 October 2020 (AFI Film Festival)
- Running time: 86 minutes
- Country: United States

Sisters with Transistors is a 2020 American documentary film directed by Lisa Rovner in her directorial debut. It premiered at the 2020 South by Southwest Film Festival and was later screened at AFI Fest. The rights to the documentary were acquired by Metrograph Pictures.

== Synopsis ==
The documentary is made up of rare testimonies and archive footage. It chronicles the stories of the pioneering but little-known women of electronic music. These composers found, thanks to machines, a space of liberty and creativity that the male-dominated world of traditional music did not allow them. The film takes us into the heart of their studio-laboratories, and into a tangle of multicolored cables, tape scraps, primitive computers and oversized synthesizers. Narrated by Laurie Anderson, the ten artists featured in the documentary are Maryanne Amacher, Bebe Barron, Suzanne Ciani, Delia Derbyshire, Pauline Oliveros, Daphne Oram, Éliane Radigue, Clara Rockmore, Wendy Carlos and Laurie Spiegel.

== Reception ==
Sisters with Transistors was positively received by critics. Rogerebert.com's Charlie Brigden gave it four stars and noted that the documentary "often feels less like a film and more like a manifesto". The narrative, futuristic soundtrack and avant-garde aspect of the film were all highly praised. The New York Times' Glenn Kenny described the film as "informative" and "fascinating. Critics at NME and Slate also gave the documentary four stars and positive reviews.
