= BBC Third Programme =

British national radio station (1946–1967)

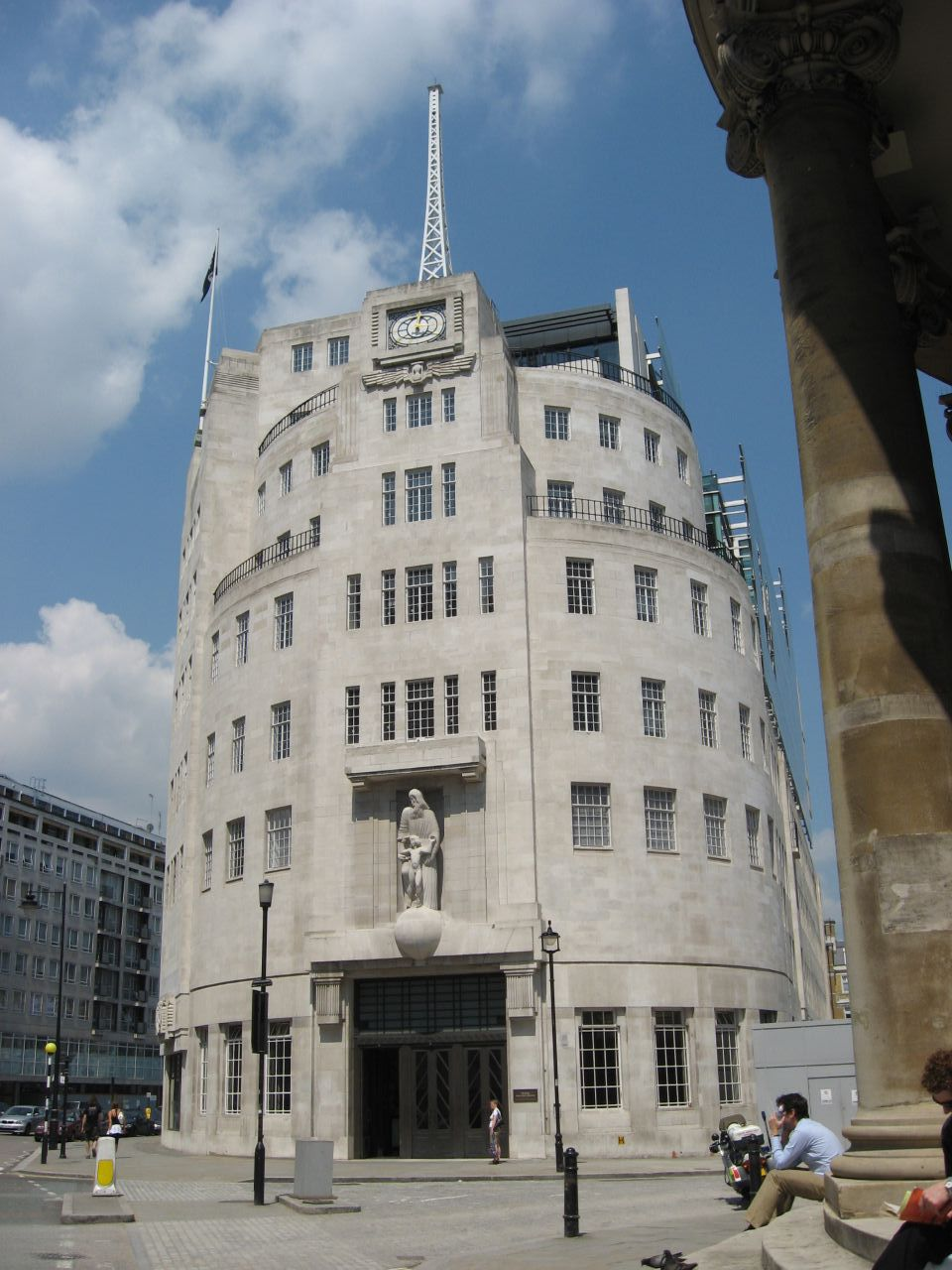
- The Third Programme headquarters was at Broadcasting House in London.
- Country: United Kingdom
- Radio stations: 647 kHz, 1547 kHz
- Headquarters: Broadcasting House, London, England
- Owner: BBC
- Established: 29 September 1946; 80 years ago
- Dissolved: 29 September 1967; 59 years ago
- Replaced by: BBC Radio 3

The BBC Third Programme was a national radio station produced and broadcast from 1946 until 1967, when it was replaced by BBC Radio 3. It first went on the air on 29 September 1946 and became one of the leading cultural and intellectual forces in Britain, playing an important role in disseminating the arts, broadcasting music (mainly classical), plays, documentary features and talks. It was the BBC's third national radio network, the other two being the Home Service (mainly speech-based) and the Light Programme, principally devoted to light entertainment and music.

== History ==
When it started in 1946, the Third Programme broadcast for six hours each evening from 6.00 pm to midnight, although its output was cut to just 24 hours a week from October 1957, with the early part of weekday evenings being given over to educational programming (known as "Network Three"). The frequencies were also used during daytime hours to broadcast complete ball-by-ball commentary on test match cricket, under the title Test Match Special.

The Third's existence was controversial from the beginning, partly because of perceived "elitism" – it was sometimes criticised for broadcasting programmes of "two dons talking" – and also for the cost of its output relative to a small listener reach. Its existence was against the corporation's founding principles, as Reith himself had during his time at the BBC been against segmenting audiences by splitting programming genres across different networks. From the start, though, it had prominent supporters: the Education Secretary in the Attlee government, Ellen Wilkinson, spoke rather optimistically of creating a "third programme nation". When it faced those 1957 cuts, the Third Programme Defence Society was formed and its leaders included T. S. Eliot, Albert Camus, and Sir Laurence Olivier.

This situation continued until the launch on 22 March 1965 of the BBC Music Programme, which began regular daily broadcasts of classical music (with some interruptions for live sports coverage) on the Network Three / Third Programme frequencies between 7.00 am and 6.30 pm on weekdays, 8.00 am and 12.30 pm on Saturdays, and 8.00 am and 5.00 pm on Sundays. The Third Programme continued as a distinct evening service, and this continued to be the case for a short while after the inception of BBC Radio 3 on 30 September 1967, before all the elements of the BBC's "third network" were finally absorbed into Radio 3 with rebranding effect from Saturday 4 April 1970.

== Output and programming ==
The network was broadly cultural, a Leavisite experiment dedicated to the discerning or "high-brow" listener from an educated, minority audience. Its founders' aims were seen as promoting "something fundamental to our civilisation" and as contributing to "the refinement of society". Its musical output provided a wide range of serious classical music and live concerts, as well as contemporary composers and jazz; popular classical music such as Beethoven, Mozart and Tchaikovsky primarily remained on the Home Service until 1964. Voice formed a much higher proportion of its output than the later Radio 3, with specially commissioned plays, poetry readings, talks and documentaries. Nationally known intellectuals such as Bertrand Russell and Isaiah Berlin on philosophy or Fred Hoyle on cosmology were regular contributors.

The network became a principal patron of the arts, within commissioned many music works for broadcast by the BBC Music Department, playing an important role in the development of the career of composers such as Benjamin Britten. Particularly notable were its drama productions, including the radio plays of Samuel Beckett, Henry Reed (the Hilda Tablet plays), Harold Pinter, Wyndham Lewis, Joe Orton and Dylan Thomas, whose Under Milk Wood was written specially for the programme. Philip O'Connor discovered Quentin Crisp in his radio interviews in 1963. The series Inventions for Radio aired in 1964 and 1965, with sound collages by Delia Derbyshire of the BBC Radiophonic Workshop. Martin Esslin, BBC Director of Drama (Radio), was associated with the network's productions of European drama, and Douglas Cleverdon with its productions of poetry and radio plays.

The Third Programme's contribution to contemporary poetry and criticism was significant, under producers and presenters such as John Wain, Ludovic Kennedy, George MacBeth and Patrick Dickinson. It promoted young writers such as Philip Larkin and Kingsley Amis, as well as the "difficult" work of David Jones and Laura Riding. The Third Programme was for many years the single largest source of copyright payments to poets.

The decision to close down the Third Programme was opposed by many within the BBC, some of them senior figures. Within the music division, a "BBC rebellion" gathered force, with its most vocal members including Hans Keller and Robert Simpson. Ultimately however, the attempt to prevent the culture-conscious Third being replaced by what Keller called "a daytime music station" proved unsuccessful.

=== Controllers ===
- 1946–1948: George Barnes
- 1948–1952: Harman Grisewood
- 1953–1958: John Morris
- 1959–1967: Howard Newby

=== Announcers ===
- Patrick Butler
- Patricia Hughes
- Alvar Lidell
- Christopher Pemberton
- Philip O'Connor
