= Delia Derbyshire =

English musician and composer of electronic music (1937–2001)

- Delia Derbyshire at the BBC Radiophonic Workshop

Background information
- Born: Delia Ann Derbyshire; 5 May 1937; Coventry, Warwickshire, England
- Died: 3 July 2001 (aged 64) Northampton, Northamptonshire, England
- Genres: Electronic music, musique concrète, library music
- Occupation: Composer
- Years active: 1959–2001
- Formerly of: White Noise, Unit Delta Plus
- Website: delia-derbyshire.org

Delia Ann Derbyshire (5 May 1937 – 3 July 2001) was an English musician and composer of electronic music. She worked with the BBC Radiophonic Workshop during the 1960s, including an electronic arrangement of the theme music to the British science-fiction television series Doctor Who and on the landmark radio feature series the Inventions for Radio. She has been referred to as "the unsung heroine of British electronic music", having influenced musicians including Aphex Twin, the Chemical Brothers and Paul Hartnoll of Orbital.

== Biography ==
=== Early life ===
Derbyshire was born in Coventry, daughter of Emma (née Dawson) and Edward Derbyshire. of Cedars Avenue, Coundon, Coventry. Her father was a sheet-metal worker. She had one sibling, a sister, who died young. Her father died in 1965 and her mother in 1994.

During the Second World War, immediately after the Coventry Blitz in 1940, she was moved to Preston, Lancashire for safety. Her parents were from the town and most of her surviving relatives still live in the area. She was very bright and, by the age of four, was teaching others in her class to read and write in primary school, but said "The radio was my education". Her parents bought her a piano when she was eight years old. Educated at Barr's Hill Grammar School from 1948 to 1956, she was accepted at both Oxford and Cambridge, "quite something for a working class girl in the 'fifties, where only one in 10 [students] were female", winning a scholarship to study mathematics at Girton College, Cambridge but, apart from some success in the mathematical theory of electricity, she claims she did badly. After one year at Cambridge she switched to music, graduating in 1959 with a BA in mathematics and music, having specialised in medieval and modern music history. Her other principal qualification was LRAM in pianoforte.

She approached the careers office at the university and told them she was interested in "sound, music and acoustics, to which they recommended a career in either deaf aids or depth sounding". Then she applied for a position at Decca Records, only to be told that the company did not employ women in their recording studios. Instead, she took positions at the United Nations in Geneva, from June to September, teaching piano to the children of the British Consul-General and mathematics to the children of Canadian and South American diplomats. Then from September to December, she worked as an assistant to Gerald G. Gross, Head of Plenipotentiary and General Administrative Radio Conferences at the International Telecommunication Union. She returned to Coventry and from January to April 1960 taught general subjects in a primary school there. Then she went to London, where from May to October she was an assistant in the promotion department of music publishers Boosey & Hawkes.

=== BBC Radiophonic Workshop ===
In November 1960, she joined the BBC as a trainee assistant studio manager and worked on Record Review, a magazine programme where critics reviewed classical music recordings. She said: "Some people thought I had a kind of second sight. One of the music critics would say, 'I don't know where it is, but it's where the trombones come in', and I'd hold it up to the light and see the trombones and put the needle down exactly where it was. And they thought it was magic." She then heard about the Radiophonic Workshop and decided that was where she wanted to work. This news was received with some puzzlement by the heads in Central Programme Operation because people were usually "assigned" to the Radiophonic Workshop. But in April 1962, she was assigned there in Maida Vale, where for eleven years she would create music and sound for almost 200 radio and television programmes.

In August 1962, she assisted composer Luciano Berio at a two-week summer school at Dartington Hall, for which she borrowed several dozen items of BBC equipment. One of her first works, and most widely known, was her 1963 electronic realisation of a score by Ron Grainer for the theme of the Doctor Who series, one of the first television themes to be created and produced entirely with electronics.

When Grainer heard it, he was so amazed by her arrangement of his theme that he asked: "Did I really write this?", to which Derbyshire replied: "Most of it". Grainer attempted to credit her as co-composer, but was prevented by the BBC bureaucracy because they preferred that members of the workshop remain anonymous. She was not credited on-screen for her work until Doctor Who's 50th anniversary special, The Day of the Doctor. Derbyshire's original arrangement served as the Doctor Who main theme for its first seventeen series, from 1963 to 1980. The theme was reworked over the years, to her horror, because the only version that had her approval was the original. Delia also composed music for other BBC programmes, including Blue Veils and Golden Sands and The Delian Mode. The Doctor Who story Inferno reused some of Derbyshire's music originally composed for other productions.

In 1964–65, she collaborated with the British artist and playwright Barry Bermange for the BBC's Third Programme to produce four Inventions for Radio, a series of radio features in which people described their thoughts on dreams, belief in God, the possibility of life after death, and the experience of old age, voiced over an electronic soundscape. In 1966, working with composer George Newson, she collaborated on the BBC experimental radio drama, The Man Who Collected Sounds with producer Douglas Cleverdon.

=== Unit Delta Plus ===
In 1966 while working at the BBC, Derbyshire, fellow Radiophonic Workshop member Brian Hodgson and EMS founder Peter Zinovieff set up Unit Delta Plus, an organisation which they intended to use to create and promote electronic music. Based in a studio in Zinovieff's townhouse in Putney, they exhibited their music at experimental and electronic music festivals, including the 1966 The Million Volt Light and Sound Rave, at which The Beatles' "Carnival of Light" had its only public performance.

In 1966, she recorded a demo with Anthony Newley entitled "Moogies Bloogies", but Newley moved to the United States and the song was left unreleased until 2014. After a troubled performance at the Royal College of Art, in 1967, the unit disbanded.

=== Kaleidophon and Electrophon years ===
In the late 1960s she again partnered with Hodgson to set up the Kaleidophon studio in Camden Town with fellow electronic musician David Vorhaus. The studio produced electronic music for London theatre productions, and in 1968 the three produced their first album there as the band White Noise. Their debut, An Electric Storm, is considered an influential album in the development of electronic music. Derbyshire and Hodgson subsequently left the group, and future White Noise albums were solo Vorhaus projects.

The trio, under pseudonyms, contributed to the Standard Music Library. Many of these recordings, including compositions by Derbyshire using the name "Li De la Russe" (from an anagram of the letters in "Delia" and a reference to her auburn hair) were used on the 1970s ITV science fiction rivals to Doctor Who: The Tomorrow People and Timeslip.

In 1967, Derbyshire provided sound design alongside Guy Woolfenden's score for Peter Hall's production of Macbeth with the Royal Shakespeare Company. The two composers also contributed the music to Hall's film Work Is a Four-Letter Word (1968). Her other work during this period included taking part in a performance of electronic music at The Roundhouse, which also featured work by Paul McCartney, the score for an ICI-sponsored student fashion show and the sounds for Anthony Roland's award-winning film of Pamela Bone's photography, entitled Circle of Light. She composed a score for Yoko Ono's short film Wrapping Event, but no copy of the film with the soundtrack is known to exist.

In 1973, Derbyshire left the BBC and worked briefly at Hodgson's Electrophon studio, where she contributed to the soundtrack to the film The Legend of Hell House.

In 1975, she stopped producing music. Her final works included two soundtracks for video artists Madelon Hooykaas and Elsa Stansfield on their short films Een van die dagen ("One of These Days") in 1973 and Overbruggen ("About Bridges") in 1975.

=== Later years ===
Following her music career, Derbyshire worked as a radio operator for a British Gas pipelaying project, in an art gallery, and in a bookshop. In late 1974 she married David Hunter. She also frequented the LYC Museum and Art Gallery established by Chinese artist Li Yuan-chia at his stone farmhouse in Cumbria and worked there as his assistant. In 1978, she returned to London and met Clive Blackburn. In January 1980 she bought a house in Northampton, where four months later Blackburn joined her. He remained her partner for the rest of her life.

In 2001, she returned to music, providing sounds used as source material by Peter Kember on Sychrondipity Machine (Taken from an Unfinished Dream), a 55-second track for the compilation Grain: A Compilation of 99 Short Tracks, released by Dot Dot Dot Music in 2001. In the liner notes, she is credited with "liquid paper sounds generated using Fourier synthesis of sound based on photo/pixel info (B2wav – bitmap to sound programme)". The track was released posthumously and dedicated to her.

Derbyshire's later life was chaotic due to her alcoholism. She died of renal failure brought on by cancer, aged 64, in July 2001.

== Archive ==
After Derbyshire's death, 267 reel-to-reel tapes and a box of a thousand papers were found in her attic. These were entrusted to the composer Mark Ayres, who had salvaged the tape archive of the Radiophonic Workshop, and in 2007 were given on permanent loan to the University of Manchester for preservation. The tapes consist primarily of material from Derbyshire's freelance projects (e.g. works for theatre productions, films and festivals), some of her BBC work (the majority of Derbyshire's BBC work, including the original version of the Doctor Who theme, is housed in the BBC Archive Centre at Perivale), off-air recordings of interviews with Derbyshire and recordings of music by other composers and musicians, including Karlheinz Stockhausen, Krzysztof Penderecki and Can. Almost all the tapes were digitised in 2007 by Louis Niebur and David Butler, but much of the music has not been published due to copyright complications (the four Inventions for Radio were published in 2023 with isolated music and make-up material from the archive).

In 2010, the university acquired Derbyshire's childhood collection of papers and artefacts from Andi Wolf. Subsequent donations to the archive have included items and recordings from Brian Hodgson, Madelon Hooykaas, Jo Hutton, Elisabeth Kozmian and John Cavanagh. These collections of material, including Derbyshire's working papers and digitised transfers of the tapes, are accessible at the John Rylands Library in Manchester. Material from the archive was used in the Radiophonic Workshop's score for the 2018 film Possum and provided a source of inspiration for Cosey Fanni Tutti in her soundtrack to the film Delia Derbyshire: The Myths And The Legendary Tapes (2020).

== Dramatic and documentary portrayals ==
In her 1968 novel The Bloater, Rosemary Tonks describes a BBC experimental sound studio based on the Radiophonic Workshop. Tonks had previously collaborated with Derbyshire at the Workshop on a sound poem, Sono Montage (1966). Min, the narrator of the novel, resembles Tonks herself, while her friend Jenny was partly based on Derbyshire.

In 2002, BBC Radio 4 broadcast a radio play entitled Blue Veils and Golden Sands as part of its Afternoon Play strand, telling the story of Derbyshire and her notable musical work. The play starred Sophie Thompson as Derbyshire and was written by Martyn Wade.

In October 2004, the Tron Theatre in Glasgow hosted Standing Wave, a play written by Nicola McCartney focusing on the life of Derbyshire. This was produced by Reeling and Writhing, directed by Katherine Morley, score by Pippa Murphy.

In 2009, Canadian filmmaker Kara Blake released The Delian Mode, a short documentary film about Derbyshire. The film won the Genie Award for Best Short Documentary Film in 2010.

In 2013, the BBC showed a television drama depicting the creation and early days of Doctor Who in 1963, called An Adventure in Space and Time, as part of the celebrations for the programme's 50th anniversary. Derbyshire appeared as a character in it, portrayed by Sarah Winter.

Episode 5 "Derbyshire" of the BBC children's science TV programme Absolute Genius with Dick & Dom is an exploration of Derbyshire's creation of the Doctor Who theme recording using her techniques on equipment archived from the Radiophonic Workshop.

Coventry-based theatre company Noctium Theatre produced a play named Hymns for Robots about Derbyshire's working life, which played at the 2018 Edinburgh Fringe festival.

In 2017, a short film by Caroline Catz, Delia Derbyshire: The Myths And The Legendary Tapes (2017) was screened at the BFI London Film Festival. It has been expanded into a feature-length movie that debuted in October 2020.

The 2020 documentary Sisters with Transistors touches on Delia Derbyshire's work in electronic music and the composing of the Doctor Who soundtrack.

Derbyshire was also featured in episode 4 of Mark Ronson's Watch the Sound 2021 documentary series on Apple TV+. The episode deals with synthesizers and hails Derbyshire's contributions.

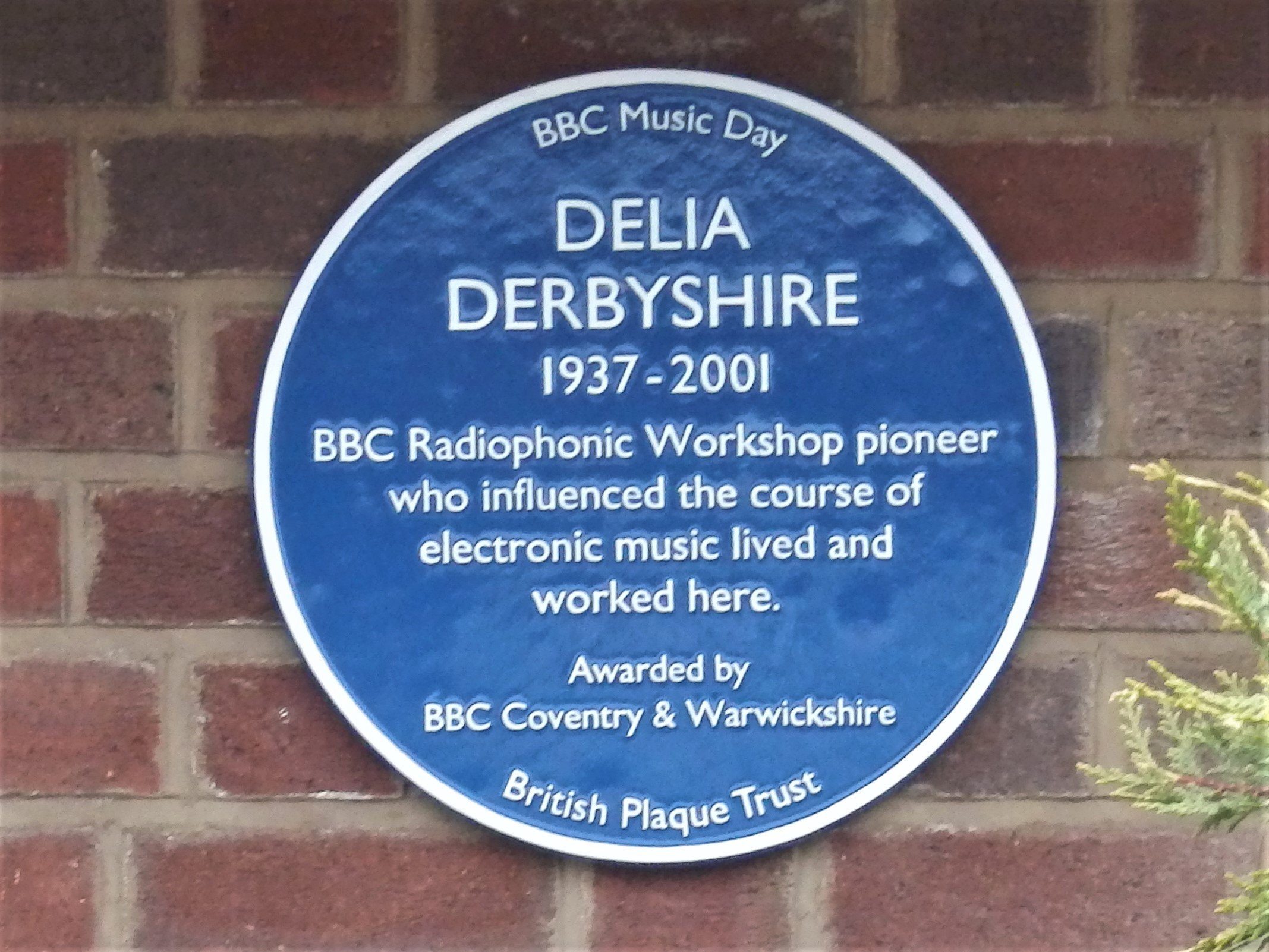
Plaque honouring Derbyshire in Coventry

== Honours ==
Her hometown Coventry named a street after her in November 2016, the "Derbyshire Way".

A blue plaque was unveiled at Derbyshire's former home of 104 Cedars Avenue, Coventry, on 15 June 2017 as part of a BBC initiative celebrating important musicians and venues. The ceremony was performed by former Doctor Who actors Colin Baker and Nicola Bryant along with BBC Coventry & Warwickshire presenter Vic Minett.

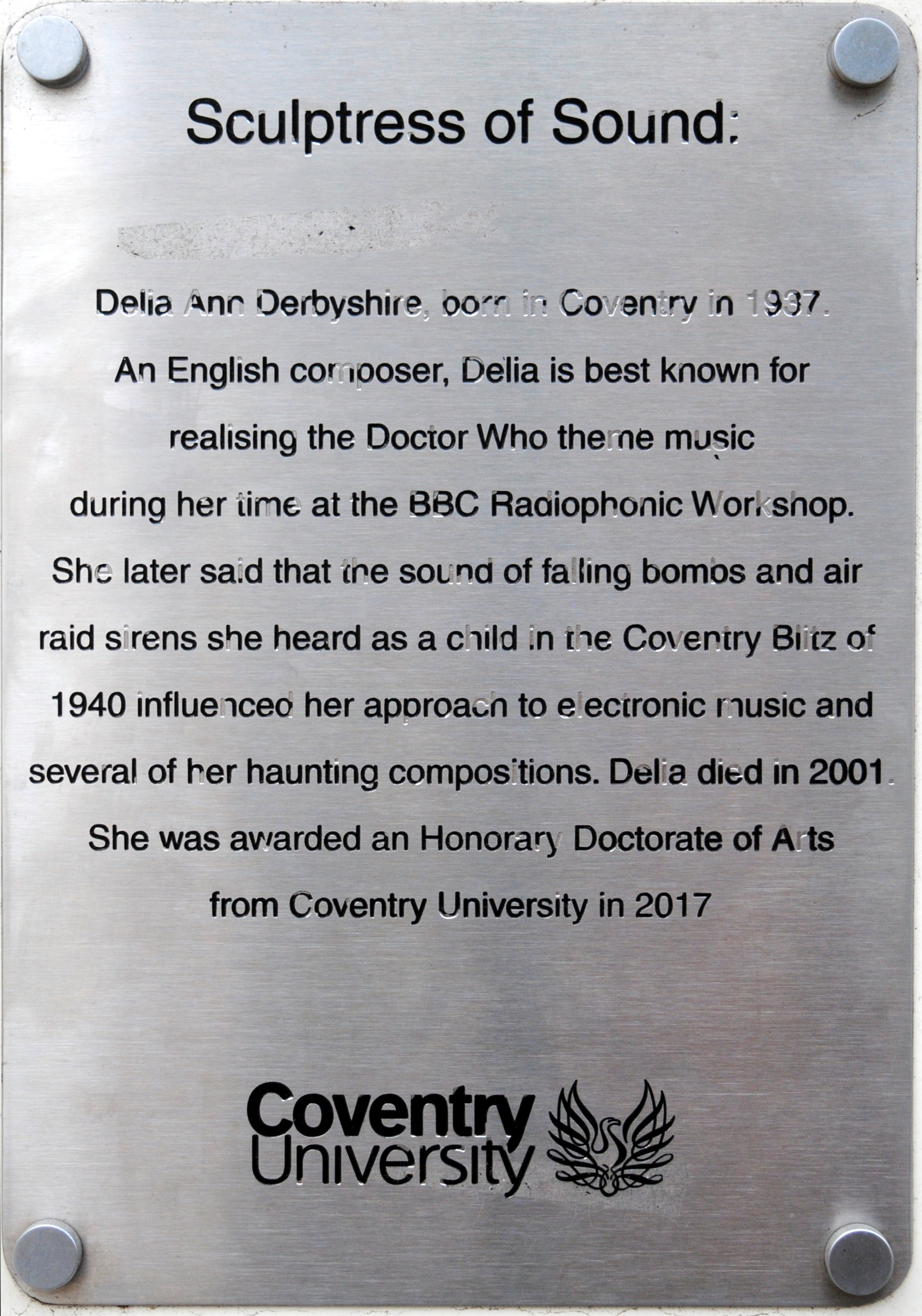
Plaque honouring Derbyshire at Coventry University

On 20 November 2017, Derbyshire was awarded a posthumous honorary doctorate for her notable contributions to electronic music, by Coventry University, who also erected a plaque honouring Derbyshire, on their Ellen Terry Building. Adjacent to it is a mural depicting Derbyshire. There is a permanent display dedicated to Derbyshire at the Coventry Music Museum.

In 2022, Coventry University announced that it would name its new flagship Faculty of Arts and Humanities building after Derbyshire. The Delia Derbyshire building was officially opened in May 2024.

== See also ==
- Daphne Oram
- Else Marie Pade

== Further reading and documentaries ==
- BBC 4, "Alchemists of Sound", Saturday 28 May 2005. Television documentary on the BBC Radiophonic Workshop.
- BBC Radio 4, Sculptress of Sound: The Lost Works of Delia Derbyshire, Saturday 27 March 2010. Radio documentary about Delia Derbyshire, her work at the BBC Radiophonic Workshop, and the ongoing digital archiving of a collection of her recordings.
- Book by Louis Niebur, "Special Sound: The Creation and Legacy of the BBC Radiophonic Workshop", Oxford University Press, 2010.
- A short documentary, The Delian Mode, was released in 2009, written and directed by Kara Blake.
- James Percival's "Delia Derbyshire's Creative Process" (MA dissertation, University of Manchester, 2013), describes some of her sound-construction techniques and contains the most complete catalogue of her known works.
- Teresa Winter's 2015 PhD thesis, "Delia Derbyshire: Sound and Music for the BBC Radiophonic Workshop, 1962-1973", focuses primarily on Derbyshire's creative output at the BBC Radiophonic Workshop.
- David Butler's 2019 article, "Whatever Happened to Delia Derbyshire?", addresses several of the myths and assumptions about Derbyshire's life and work, including her creative activity after leaving the BBC in 1973.
