= Touching the Elephant (radio programme) =

BBC radio documentary

- Genre: feature
- Running time: 25 mins
- Language: English
- Home station: BBC Radio 4
- Hosted by: Kim Normanton
- Produced by: Matt Thompson
- No. of episodes: 1

Touching the Elephant was a BBC radio feature about perception, first broadcast on 16 April 1997, in which four blind people are taken to meet and touch an elephant. The idea was a response to a well-known fable about blind men and an elephant. Presenter Kim Normanton and the participants – Danni, a woman who loves animals; Graham, a computer buff; Tom, a piano tuner; and 10-year-old Lauren – discuss their idea of ‘elephant’ before meeting Dilberta the elephant at London Zoo. Excerpts of this documentary were aired on BBC Radio 4's "Beasts" episode of Short Cuts.
