= Sean Street =

British poet (born 1946)

- Born: 2 June 1946 (age 80); Waterlooville, England
- Education: Birmingham School of Speech and Drama
- Years active: 1967–present
- Spouse: Joanne Dynan (m. 1970)
- Children: 2; including Zoë Howe

Sean Street (born 2 June 1946, Waterlooville, Hampshire) is a writer, poet, broadcaster. and Britain's first Professor of Radio. He retired from full-time academic life in 2011 and was awarded an emeritus professorship by Bournemouth University. He continues to write and broadcast. He is also a Life Fellow of the Royal Society of Arts.

== Acting ==
He trained as an actor at the Birmingham School of Speech and Drama (1964–67), and spent a year in Paris, France before pursuing an acting career in the UK. He appeared in a number of television dramas and soaps, including Alexander Graham Bell and United for BBC 1. During 1968 he toured England and Northern Ireland with the Arion Theatre Company, and later that year joined the Drama Centre Studio, Bournemouth. From 1969 to 1970 he was a member of the cast of Barry England's play, Conduct Unbecoming, which starred Maxine Audley, Paul Jones and Jeremy Clyde, directed by Val May, at the Queen's Theatre, London, prior to taking up his first staff position at the BBC.

== Radio ==
In April 1970, while appearing in the West End play, Conduct Unbecoming, he was invited to sit in on a live late night BBC Radio 2 programme, where he witnessed the unfolding drama of the Apollo 13 incident. It was a seminal moment, and persuaded Street that his future lay in the medium of radio.

He joined the staff of BBC Radio Solent later that year, as the new station prepared for its first transmission and eventually stayed there for six years. After a four-year interval teaching drama and poetry studies at The Arts Educational School he returned to radio, this time working in the independent sector as part of the founding team of 2CR, (subsequently Heart Dorset & New Forest) Bournemouth. As Features Editor at the station, he produced a number of documentaries and features which were heard on many stations across the ILR (Independent Local Radio) network. In 1986, Street became freelance, making programmes for BBC Radios 2, 3, 4, the World Service and also for LBC. The features were mostly of an historical/literary nature.

He started teaching radio production at Bournemouth University in 1987, and from the 1990s into the 21st century, he played a role in the development of the increasingly important discipline of Radio Studies in academia. In 1999 he founded the MA in Radio Production in Bournemouth's Media School. In the same year he was awarded a professorship, becoming Britain's first Professor of Radio, while continuing to make his own radio programmes for the main BBC networks.

Between 2000 and 2011, he was Director of the Centre for Broadcasting History Research, leading a number of significant initiatives to digitise UK radio, with particular emphasis on the commercial sector. In 2003 he established Charles Parker Day, a one-day conference to explore aspects of the creator (with Ewan MacColl) of 'The Radio Ballads'. This has now become an annual event in the UK radio conference calendar. The conference includes the award of the 'Charles Parker Prize for Student Radio Features'.

In 2004 and 2005 Street was academic leader of Global Watch Missions run by the UK Department of Trade and Industry, exploring new technical developments in radio in the US, South Korea and Singapore subsequently publishing the results in reports which were to have considerable influence on many areas of UK radio development. Between 2000 and 2010 he made several visits to Newfoundland and Nova Scotia. Out of this came a number of radio programmes, academic papers and poems, notably The Broadcast, a sequence based on the Canadian Broadcasting Corporation programme, The Fisheries Broadcast.

== Writing ==
After leaving Radio Solent in 1976 he took up a post teaching drama and poetry studies at the Arts Educational School, Tring Park. Here he developed his own writing skills, including magazine journalism, poetry, playwriting and adaptation.

He was commissioned by Salisbury Playhouse to write two plays A Shepherd's Life (1985) and Wessex Days (1990) both of which were subsequently toured by Lifeblood Theatre. In 1993 The Royal Theatre, Northampton commissioned his play about the poet John Clare, Honest John which won the Eileen Anderson/Central Television Award for new drama in that year. For the actor Christopher Robbie he wrote his one-man play on the life of Charles Darwin, Beyond Paradise – The Wildlife of a Gentle Man, which began touring in 1998 and continues to do so.

In 1992-3 Street wrote two books on literary themes, "The Wreck of the Deutschland" and "The Dymock Poets"; examples of realist-narrative criticism.

Between 2002 and 2006 he wrote a number of books on radio history which were to become key texts for academic courses and scholars, among them Crossing the Ether, based on research originally undertaken while studying for his doctorate on pre-war UK commercial radio and the BBC.

His radio programme The Broadcast helped to inspire his 2009 Rockingham Press collection, Time Between Tides, New and Selected Poems. In 2012 Routledge published The Poetry of Radio, The Colour of Sound, a work which drew together the two creative passions of his life, radio and poetry. He has also developed collaborations with a number of composers, including Cecilia McDowall (see below).

In February 2014, the Belfast independent poetry press, Lapwing published his sequence of 25 poems, Jazz Time; a work that explores the improvisatory nature of life, being human, and the redemptive power of music.

In 2014, Routledge published The Memory of Sound: Preserving the Sonic Past. In the same year, Seren published a revised edition of his much-praised book, The Dymock Poets: Poetry, Place and Memory, which first appeared in 1993. In May 2015, Rowman and Littlefield published the revised and extended second edition of Street's Historical Dictionary of British Radio.

During 2015, Street was working on the text of a film-poem, commissioned by Salisbury Cathedral to celebrate the 13th century church builder, poet and cleric, Elias of Dereham, who brought a copy of Magna Carta to Old Sarum, and was later a key figure in the building of the new Cathedral, where he became a Canon. The film, Elias, was directed by Trevor Hearing of Red Balloon Productions, and featured Andrew Cuthbert in the role of Elias. In January 2016, Elias was posted on the Salisbury Cathedral website. A poem based on the text of the film appears in Street's 2016 collection, "Camera Obscura" (Rockingham Press).

During 2017, Palgrave published Sound Poetics: Interaction and Personal Identity, the third in a series of books on sound begun in 2012 with The Poetry of Radio and continued in 2015 with The Memory of Sound. In the same year, Lapwing published his sequence, Talk, Radio: Poems of Transmission. In May 2017, a performance work, Estuary, based on his poems of rivers, harbours and tides, was premiered at The Capstone Theatre, Liverpool, as part of the Writing on the Wall Festival, featuring the dancer, Rachel Sweeney, the video artist Peter Dover, the vocalist Perri Alleyne-Hughes and the musician Neil Campbell, featuring Campbell's original musical interpretations of the poems. A CD of the work was simultaneously released.

2018 saw the publication by Palgrave of Sound at the Edge of Perception: the Aural Minutiae of Sand and other Worldly Murmurings, a sequel to Sound Poetics, published the previous year. To this was added The Sound Inside the Silence: Travels in the Sonic Imagination (Palgrave, 2019), thus completing a trilogy of books on the subject.

In 2020, Street returned to Routledge as his main prose publisher, and their New York office commissioned his latest book, "The Sound of a Room: Memory and the Auditory Presence of Place".

In 2023, Bloomsbury published Wild Track: Sound, Text, and the Idea of Birdsong, an exploration of nature and the ways in which its sound was conveyed, described and responded to through text, prior to the advent of recording and broadcast technologies in the late 19th and early 20th centuries. The book was a finalist in the Prose Awards, Environmental Science category in 2024.

Since 2011, Street has enjoyed a fruitful working relationship with the British composer, Cecilia McDowall. From this have sprung a range of commissioned choral works, many with strong feminist themes, including Standing as I Do Before God, commemorating the WWII nurse Edith Cavell, and Photo 51, a BBC commission to mark the work of the crystallographer Rosalind Franklin.

In 2019 Glasgow School of Art Choir commissioned McDowall and Street to write something for the Composeher project, and the resulting work was a 3-part piece about Clara Barton, a nurse and humanitarian who served in the American Civil War, and was subsequently instrumental in establishing the American branch of the International Red Cross. Angel of the Battlefield, had its premiere in May, 2023. As with previous collaborations, the text combined Street's poetry with the personal testimonies of the subject, drawn from archival sources.

== Personal life ==
In 1968 he met actress, theatre coach and director Joanne Dynan. They married in 1970 and have two daughters, Jemma Street (b. 1972) who is an artist and picture editor, and Zoë Howe (b. 1979), who is a music author, musician and artist.

== Publications ==
=== Sound Poetics ===
- The Poetry of Radio-The Colour of Sound – Hardback (Routledge, 2012)
- The Poetry of Radio: the Colour of Sound – Paperback (Routledge, 2013)
- The Memory of Sound: Preserving the Sonic Past – Hardback (Routledge, 2014)
- The Memory of Sound: preserving the Sonic Past - Paperback (Routledge, 2015)
- Sound Poetics: Interaction and Personal Identity – Hardback (Palgrave, 2017)
- Sound at the Edge of Perception: The Aural Minutiae of Sand and Other Worldly Murmurings - Hardback/Paperback (Palgrave, 2018)
- The Sound Inside the Silence: Travels in the Sonic Imagination – Hardback/Paperback (Palgrave, 2019)
- The Sound of a Room: Memory and the Auditory Presence of Place – Hardback/Paperback. (Routledge, 2020)
- Wild Track – Sound, Text and the Idea of Birdsong – Hardback.(Bloomsbury Academic, 2023)

=== Poetry ===
- Poems of Earth and Sky (Paul Cave, 1976)
- Figure in a Landscape ( Outposts,1980)
- Carvings (Guthlaxton Wordsmith, 1981)
- A Walk in Winter (Enitharmon, 1989)
- This True Making (KQBX Press, 1992)
- Radio and Other Poems (Rockingham Press, 1999)
- Radio Waves (Enitharmon, 2004)
- Time Between Tides, New and Selected Poems (Rockingham Press, 2009)
- Cello (Rockingham Press, 2013)
- Jazz Time (Lapwing Press, 2014)
- Camera Obscura (Rockingham Press, 2016)
- Talk, Radio (Lapwing, 2017)
- The Sound Recordist (Maytree Press, March 2021)
- Journey into Space (Shoestring Press, September 2022)
- Running Out of Time (Shoestring Press, February 2024)
- Candlelight (Poetry Salzburg, July 2026)

=== Radio and Sound ===
- A Concise History of British Radio (Kelly Publications, 2002)
- The Future of Radio – a Mission to the USA (DTI/Global Watch, 2004)
- The Future of Radio – a Mission to South Korea and Singapore (DTI/Global Watch, 2005)
- Crossing the Ether, British Public Service Radio and Commercial Competition 1922–1945 (John Libbey, 2006)
- The Historical Dictionary of British Radio (Scarecrow Press, 2007)
- The A to Z of British Radio (Scarecrow Press, 2009)
- The Historical Dictionary of British Radio (2nd Edition) Hardback. (Rowman and Littlefield, 2015)

=== Literature ===
- The Wreck of the Deutschland – An Historical Note (Interim Press, 1987)
- The Wreck of the Deutschland (Souvenir Press, 1992)
- The Dymock Poets (Seren, 1993)
- Rupert Brooke: the Unimpeded Self (Dymock Poets Archive and Study Centre, 1996)
- The Dymock Poets (New Revised Edition) (Seren, 2014)

=== Music ===
- The Bournemouth Symphony Orchestra (with Raymond Carpenter) (Dovecote Press, 1993)
- Shipping Forecast (with Cecilia McDowall) (Oxford University Press, 2011)
- Theatre of Tango (with Cecilia McDowall) (Oxford University Press, 2011)
- Seventy Degrees Below Zero (with Cecilia McDowall) (Oxford University Press, 2012)
- Estuary, (with Neil Campbell) 2017
- Standing as I do Before God (with Cecilia McDowall) (Oxford University Press, 2018)
- Photo 51 (with Cecilia McDowall) (BBC commission/Oxford University Press, 2020)
- Angel of the Battlefield (with Cecilia McDowall) (Glasgow School of Art Choir commission/ Oxford University Press, 2022)

=== Topographical ===
- Hampshire Miscellany (Countryside Books, 1984)
- Tales of Old Dorset (Countryside Books, 1985)
- Petersfield, a Pictorial Past (Ensign, 1989)
- A Remembered Land (Michael Joseph, 1993)

== Radio documentaries and features (selected) ==
- 6BM Calling (BBC Radio Solent, 1973)
- The Poet Speaks (Series, 2CR, Bournemouth, 1980–82)
- Daughter the Younger (2CR, Bournemouth, 1985)
- The Drift of Time (BBC Radio 4, 1986)
- Tolkien, Maker of Middle Earth (LBC, 1986)
- David Gascoyne – A Burning Sound (BBC Radio 4, 1993)
- Keith Douglas – Simplify Me When I'm Dead (BBC Radio 4, 1994)
- On Sussex Hills (Series, with Christopher Cook, BBC Radio 2, 1995)
- Then-Now (BBC Radio 4, 2006)
- The Splintered City (BBC Radio 3, 2007)
- The Trial of Ezra Pound (BBC Radio 3, 2008)
- Sable Island, a Dune Adrift (BBC Radio 4, 2009)
- At Cupid's Cove (BBC Radio 3/CBC Radio 1, 2009)
- Ludwig Koch and the Music of Nature (BBC Radio 4, 2010)
- The Blackbird (Newstalk, Ireland/ABC Radio National, Australia, 2010)
- Walls of Sound (BBC Radio 4, 2011/12)
- The Sound of Fear (BBC Radio 4, 2011)
- The Shape of Things that Came (BBC Radio 4, 2017)
- Charles Parker: Radio Pioneer (Centenary Programme, with Andy Cartwright, Soundscape Productions) BBC Radio 4,2019

== Drama ==
=== Original drama ===
- 1979 Tea Set and Match – NPN Publishing
- 1985 A Shepherd's Life – Salisbury Playhouse
- 1990 Wessex Days – Salisbury Playhouse (Later revived and toured by Lifeblood Theatre)
- 1993 Honest John – Royal Theatre, Northampton (Central Television Award for new writing).
- 1998 Beyond Paradise – the Wildlife of a Gentle Man – Dragonfly Productions
- 2000 Urban Sonnets – (in Metropolis Kabarett, Royal National Theatre)

=== Adaptations ===
- 1986 The Drift of Time (BBC Radio 4)
- 1995 Procession to the Private Sector (BBC Radio 3)

== Exhibitions ==
Street's poetry has inspired, or has been inspired by a number of artists, leading to joint exhibitions. Featured artists include the painters George Dannatt, Frank Finn, Michael Gough, Tony Paul, Bernard Miles Pearson and Jemma Street, as well as the sculptor, Elisabeth Frink, and the wood carver John Fuller.
