= Christian Lerch =

German journalist (born 1978)

Christian Lerch (born 1978) is a journalist and radio documentary producer based in Vienna, Austria, and Berlin, Germany.

== Early life and education ==
Lerch graduated from the University of Vienna, He studied at the Erasmus University in Rotterdam, Netherlands.

== Career ==
Lerch worked at the Leo Baeck Institute in New York City.

In 2006 he began working as a radio producer, author and director for radio art/documentaries for the Austrian Broadcasting Corporation ORF, the cultural channel Radio Österreich 1 and the German public broadcasting network WDR focusing on political and (pop-)culture topics. In 2009 he produced the radio documentary "Sold/Verkauft!" about four Uighur men who had been sold as suspected terrorists to the CIA and imprisoned for four years at the prison camp Guantánamo Bay. The radio documentary was published as an audio book in 2011.

Lerch created a three part series of radio programs on illegal drugs: "Crystal Meth. A homemade drug" (produced by the ORF 2007), "Apocalypse Goa" (a co-production of WDR/ORF 2010) and "Viva La Muerte. The drug ballads of northern Mexico" (produced by the WDR/ORF 2012) are documentaries commissioned for broadcast in Germany, Austria and Switzerland.

Lerch is the co-founder of "name>it positive media" and co-editor of the 2010 FIFA World Cup web journal kaptransmissions.org.

Lerch occasionally writes and publishes for newspapers, including Der Standard, Wiener Zeitung and the Russian weekly magazine Ogoniok.

In 2014, Lerch was a fellow at the European Journalism Fellowships at the Freie Universität Berlin, researching surveillance and control of public urban spaces in Germany and in the United States.

In collaboration with the German theater director Matthias Kapohl Lerch produced in 2015 the first binaural radio feature. Through this recording and production technology the radio documentary "Bi-Normal" enables the listeners to a 3D audio experience, that is usually used for radio drama and in sounds for movies.

With the multimedia documentary #illegaledrogentöten (eng. illegal drugs kill) Lerch finalized 2016 the trilogy on the devastating effects of the global war on drugs in consumer markets, transit and producing countries of illegal drugs. It was the first live social media radio documentary, using social media comments as a narrative.

For Austria’s prestigious art museum Kunsthistorisches Museum Vienna, Lerch developed and curated 2019 the multimedia project “six seasons” consisting of an audio podcast and animated videos. Six paintings from the renowned old masters collection of the museum were used by a selection of contemporary writers (a.o. Ann Cotten, Mark von Schlegell, Hanno Millesi) to write fictional short stories, that were transformed into a series of audio dramas. Through fictional storytelling “six seasons” provides a contemporary perception of Renaissance and Baroque paintings, conveying historical artistic intention into new and varied media formats.

Lerch was an executive producer for the documentary series Sockenpuppenzoo in 2025. The podcast explored the activities of the right-wing group known as "Rosa-Liebknecht-Zoo," which sought to politically influence and manipulate the German-language Wikipedia. Through investigative reporting, the documentary examined the group's strategies, including the use of sockpuppet accounts and coordinated edits, highlighting broader concerns about ideological interference in online knowledge platforms. The series was selected by Die Zeit as one of the top eleven podcasts of the year 2025.

Next to his work as an editor and journalist he is visiting lecturer at the University of Konstanz, where he teaches storytelling and research in audio journalism.

In 2026 Lerch adapted the Sardinian Documentary „Iolanda mi nant de nòmini“, by artist-duo Studiolanda, for the German public broadcasters SWR Kultur and Deutschlandradio Kultur. It features the poems and songs of the late Sardinian Artist Orlanda Sassu.

== Awards ==
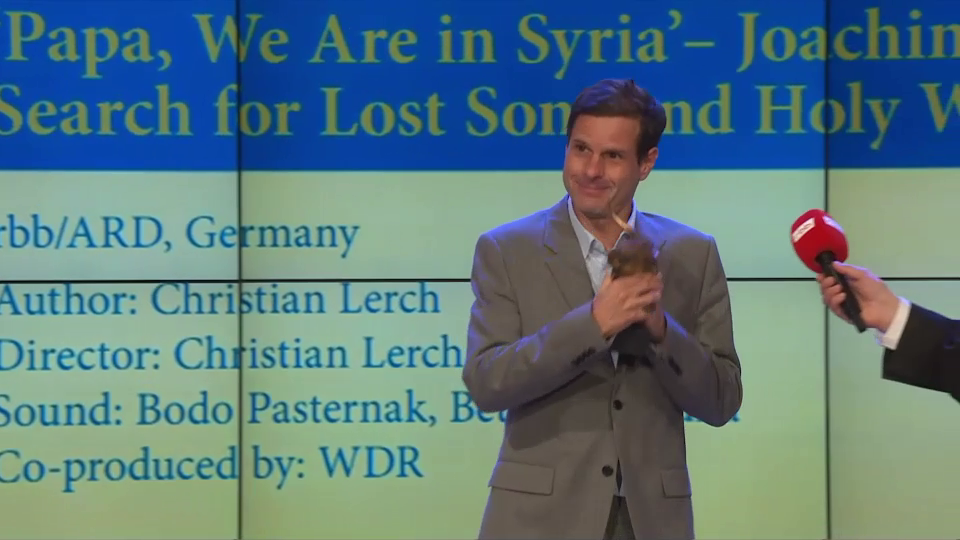
Christian Lerch, winner of the Prix Europa for the Best European radio documentary 2017.

Lerch received various awards, including the Award for ORF Journalists, and the Hans Nerth- Radio Scholarship. In the years 2010 and 2011 Christian Lerch was nominated for the CNN Journalist Award and for the Austrian Journalism Prize, the Dr. Karl Renner Prize In the year 2010 he received the second prize of the FEATUREPREIS Award in Basel, Switzerland.

For the documentary #illegaledrogentöten (English title: #illegaldrugskill) the third and final part of the trilogy on the effects of illegal drugs and of the war on drugs Lerch was awarded a Silver Award for the best radio programs 2017 at the New York Festivals. With the program "Papa we're in Syria" Lerch followed a father searching and trying to rescue his sons, who had joined the so-called Islamic State/ISIS in Syria 2015. That program won him the prestigious European Media Award Prix Europa for the Best European Radio Documentary 2017.

The jury of the BBC Audio Drama Award selected the podcast "six seasons" as a finalist for Best European Drama 2021.

== See also ==
- Ö1
- Deutschlandradio Kultur
- Westdeutscher Rundfunk
