= Hilda Tablet =

Hilda Tablet is a fictitious "twelve-tone composeress" created by Henry Reed in a series of radio comedy plays for the British Broadcasting Corporation's Third Programme. Hilda is the inventor of musique concrète renforcée (literally, "reinforced concrete music"), and the composer of the all-female opera Emily Butter set in a department store.

She first appeared in the play A Very Great Man Indeed where the central character and narrator is the scholar, Herbert Reeve, played by Hugh Burden. Reeve plans to write a biography of the novelist Richard Shewin, and interviews various friends and relatives of the deceased author.

Reed became intrigued by the character of Hilda and subsequently wrote a sequel The Private Life of Hilda Tablet in which Reeve is bullied into undertaking the biography in "not more than twelve volumes" of Hilda. Five further episodes followed. Hilda Tablet was played by Mary O'Farrell.

The principal models for Hilda were Dame Ethel Smyth (from whom Hilda took her lesbianism and rural heartiness together with the endlessness of her proposed memoirs), and Elisabeth Lutyens, with whom Reed was acquainted, from whom Hilda took her interest in the macabre and obsession with architecture.

== The plays ==
- A Very Great Man Indeed (7 September 1953)
- The Private Life of Hilda Tablet (24 May 1954)
- Emily Butter (14 November 1954)
- A Hedge, Backwards (29 February 1956)
- The Primal Scene, As It Were (11 March 1958)
- Not a Drum Was Heard (6 May 1959)
- Musique Discrète (27 October 1959)

== Cast ==
- Hugh Burden as Herbert Reeve
- Mary O'Farrell as Hilda Tablet
- Marjorie Westbury as Elsa Strauss
- Carleton Hobbs as Stephen Shewin
- Deryck Guyler as General Gland

And included (among others): Denis Quilley, Leonard Sachs, Michael Flanders, Norman Shelley and Rose Hill.

Hilda's music, and the pop-songs of Owen Shewin, were created for the series by Donald Swann.

All seven plays were produced by Douglas Cleverdon.

== Books ==
Hilda Tablet and Others, BBC Books, London, 1971 – contains the scripts of A Very Great Man Indeed, The Private Life of Hilda Tablet, A Hedge Backwards, and The Primal Scene, As It Were....

== Quotes ==
- "By all means throw your voice at the note, but whatever you do, for God's sake miss it!"
  —Hilda to a singer of one of her compositions.
