= Patrick Dickinson =

English cricketer

Patrick John Dickinson (28 August 1919 – 28 May 1984) was an English first-class cricketer active from 1939 to 1953 who played for Surrey. He was born in India, and died in St Pancras, London.

He was educated at King's College School, Wimbledon, and went up to St John's College, Cambridge, in autumn 1938.
