= Charles Parker (producer) =

Charles Parker (1919–1980) was a Bournemouth born, BBC Radio producer based in Birmingham from 1954 to 1972, who specialised in Documentary Radio and Theatre. In particular, he is remembered for his collaboration with Ewan MacColl and Peggy Seeger on the 1958–1963 series of Radio Ballads, which won the Prix Italia for Radio Documentary in 1960 and is seen as a landmark of study in oral history.

He came to believe passionately in the value of the testimony of working people and the creative importance of the oral tradition and its relationship to folk music. This became the key to his work in radio, theatre and in his extensive teaching activities.

He was a founder, writer, singer and actor with Banner Theatre in Birmingham from 1974 to 1980 and in 1966 established the Birmingham and Midland Folk Centre with Roy Palmer, Pam and Alan Bishop, Joan Smith, Olga Nicholls and other enthusiasts in the area.

According to his frequent co-worker Philip Donnellan, Charles despised the fact he was born in Bournemouth, as he would have preferred to have been born somewhere he saw as more romantic like the backstreets of Bradford, Birmingham, or East Lancashire.

== Legacy ==
The Charles Parker Archive is deposited in the Archives & Heritage Service at the Library of Birmingham and consists of tapes, production books, papers, correspondence and scripts for most of the programmes Charles Parker produced and the organisations in which he was active.

It contains historical records for studying the culture of the 1950s–1970s in broadcasting, the folk revival, pop music, community arts - as well as contemporary social and political issues. Parker made programmes with blind people, Irish labourers, workers in China in 1972, Asian teenagers, protesters against the Vietnam War and other minorities traditionally denied a voice on the air.

Parker collaborated on several occasions with documentarist Philip Donnellan, notably on The Colony (1963) and The Irishmen (1965).

The Charles Parker Archive Trust is active in promoting the Archive and in fundraising to disseminate its contents. Two Heritage Lottery grants have enabled cataloguing to take place within the City of Birmingham's Collecting Histories project.

== Charles Parker Day ==
The annual Charles Parker Day was first organised by Professor Seán Street of the Centre for Broadcasting History Research at Bournemouth University. This has been hosted at Bournemouth, at the School of Media in Birmingham City University, at the University of Sunderland and most recently at the Library of Birmingham. The day takes the form of a conference celebrating Charles Parker's work, the radio feature in general, and other related topics.

The Charles Parker Day is now organised by Andy Cartwright, of Soundscape Productions and the University of Sunderland, on behalf of the Charles Parker Trust and is now hosted by universities around the UK. From 2008 to 2014 the conference celebrated the 50th anniversaries of the Radio Ballads; 2008 - 'The Ballad of John Axon' (Bournemouth), 2009 - 'The Song of a Road' (Bradford Media Museum), 2010 - 'Singing the Fishing' (University of Sunderland), 2011 - 'The Big Hewer' (University of Sunderland at CastleGate Centre, Newcastle), 2012 - 'The Body Blow' (University of Westminster), 2013 - 'On the Edge' and 'The Fight Game' (Salford University) and 2014 - 'The Travelling People' (Library of Birmingham). Since then the days have been held at Glasgow's Centre for Contemporary Arts (2015), University of the West of England in Bristol (2016), Sheffield Hallam University Students Union (2017) and the British Library (2018).

The 2019 event will take place at the Bournemouth University’s Faculty of Media and Communication on Friday 5 April 2019.

== The Charles Parker Prize ==
The Charles Parker Prize is awarded each year for the Best Student Radio Feature. The prize was introduced in 2005 and is open to students of radio production in the UK. The feature should in some way reflect an essence of Parker's own work – for example, story led documentaries (or short features) that bring life to the stories and concerns of ordinary people through creative radio production techniques.

== Bibliography ==
Long, Paul (2004). 'British Radio and the Politics of Culture in Post-War Britain: The Work of Charles Parker’, The Radio Journal: International Studies in Broadcast and Audio Media, Vol. 2, No.3, pp. 131-52.
