= Radio feature =

Type of radio programme

The radio feature is a form of imaginative, non-fiction programme-making that blurs the boundaries between documentary, journalism, music, poetry and drama.

It is an artistic form that emerged distinctively from the medium of radio itself, as opposed to forms that are often found on the radio but appear elsewhere - like news, drama, music and talks. In his book BBC Features (1950), the then head of the BBC Features Department, Laurence Gilliam referred to the radio feature as, "pure radio", an art form that broadcasting had uniquely evolved.

Poet and radio historian Seán Street describes the radio feature as, "a curious hybrid between documentary and drama" that offers "dreams of reality"; a "twilight zone between the real - whatever that is - and the imagined". In the book Reality Radio: Telling True Stories in Sound, feature-maker Alan Hall noted that the radio feature embraces "sound not only for its everyday, informational qualities [...] but for its metaphoric qualities."

The radio feature has sometimes been considered a kind of laboratory for new forms of radio, as media historian Virginia Madsen notes it can become "a space for possibilities rather than rules or formulas". It has a long association with Public Service Broadcasting, with dedicated Feature or Drama Feature departments having emerged on Australian, British, Canadian, Danish, West German and South African radio in the 20th Century.

Radio features are often closely associated with their producers, defined as much by how they are made as what their subject is. The former Creative Director of the BBC's Radio Documentary Unit, Simon Elmes, described features as "closer to the film-maker's art than other sorts of radio". In his book And Now on Radio 4, he quotes former BBC Radio 4 controller Michael Green's description of the feature as, "a very special radio form" that uses "sound, creating a sense of place [...] that realm of the imagination, that I think people really value.

== Origins ==
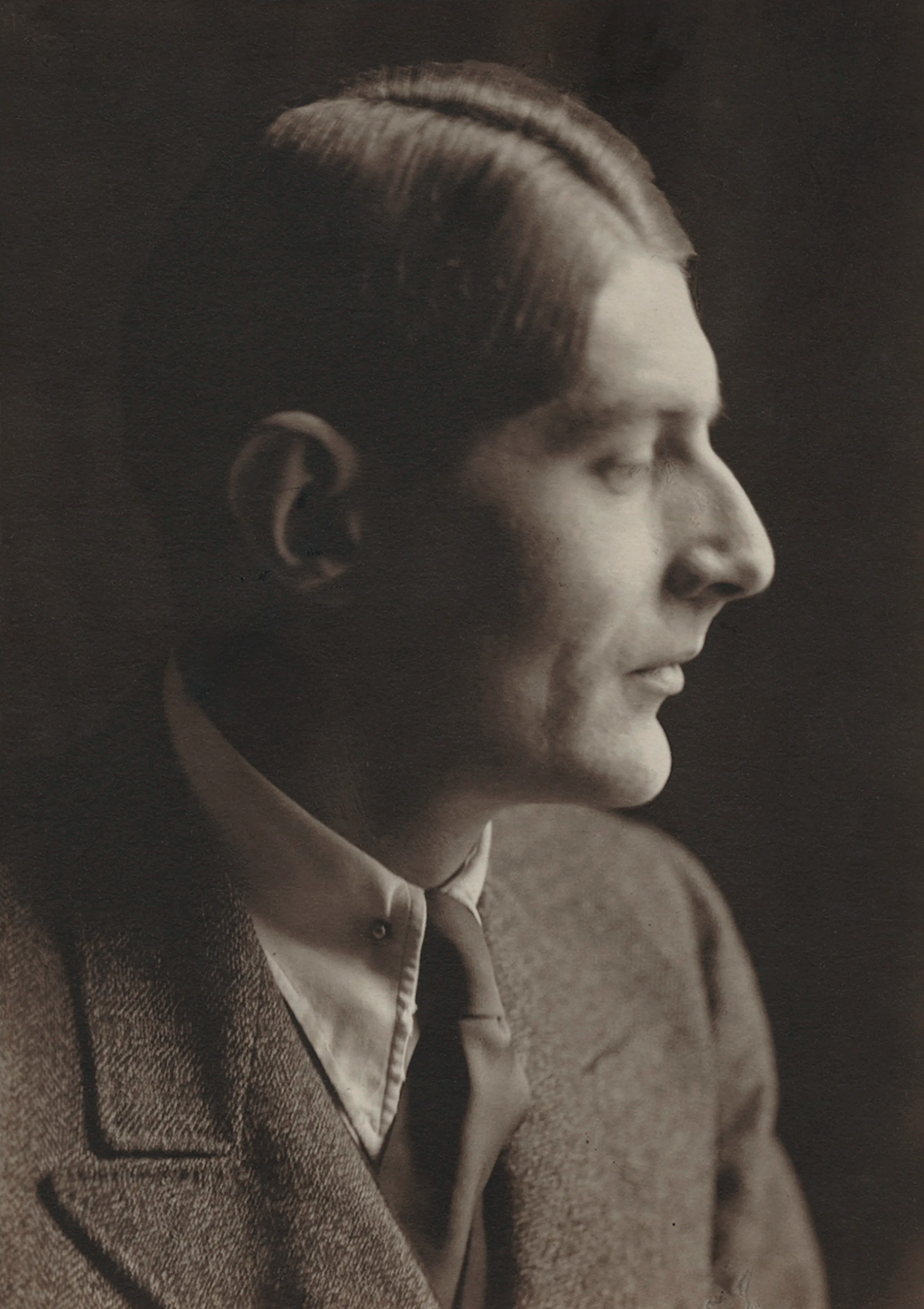
Lance Sieveking

The radio feature can be traced back to early broadcasting experiments, such as Lance Sieveking's Kaleidoscope (1928); Archie Harding's Crisis in Spain (1931); work by writers and producers like Mary Hope Allen, Tyrone Guthrie and E. A. Harding. Its roots can also be found in experiments in 'acoustic film' or 'Hörfilm', such as Walter Ruttmann's Weekend - a montage of recordings which "eavesdrop on the life of Berliners during an ordinary weekend". Weekend was both broadcast on the radio in 1930 and 'screened' on optical sound film in a cinema.

== BBC ==
=== BBC Features Department ===
Since the earliest days of BBC Radio, features have appeared in various experimental forms, created by multiple different production departments. Early radio documentaries and features were often scripted, centred on readings by actors.

In 1945 the BBC Features Department was formally created, originally under the umbrella of Val Gielgud's BBC Drama Department. It was described by its head, radio producer Laurence Gilliam, as a space where workers were "encouraged to experiment in radio forms".

Media historian David Hendy notes that the radio feature, as enacted by this first iteration of the BBC Features Department (1945–1964), was shaped by a "wonderfully loose definition" of what a feature could be, which encompassed both dramatic and poetic works (Dylan Thomas' Under Milk Wood, multiple productions by poet and producer Louis MacNeice); as well as documentaries like D. G. Bridson's The Bomb and innovative non-fiction forms like Charles Parker, Peggy Seeger and Ewan MacColl's musicalised Radio Ballads or Barry Bermange and Delia Derbyshire's Inventions for Radio.

At the time, the feature was broadly considered to be a programme that was "factual or literary in subject matter" and "imaginatively executed". Radio features were designed to make a listener "feel as well as think" and combined the "authenticity of the talk with the dramatic force of a play."

Gilliam identifies the dawn of outside broadcasting and the "travelling microphone" as formative in the development of the radio feature. Feature-makers business, he noted, "was with reality; real mean and women, in their natural setting - at home, in the places where they worked, or where they played."

Outside broadcasting ushered in an era where feature-makers would go "direct to the source" in order to "photograph in sound". Through the work of radio documentary-pioneers like BBC Manchester's Olive Shapley, Joan Littlewood and D.G. Bridson, the "mobile microphone" opened "an auditory window [...] capturing and mixing interior life (the private) with more public rituals of 'the people'".

In his introduction to the book BBC Features, Gilliam described the radio feature as, "the form of statement that broadcasting has evolved for itself, as distinct from those other forms which it has borrowed or adapted from other arts or methods of publication. It is pure radio..." This same term was later used by The Times on 7 March 1964, who described the BBC Features Department as "the growing point for pure radio, the one department which ensures the medium is explored and exploited". However, by the end of that year, the Director of Sound Broadcasting at the BBC - Frank Gillard would close the Features Department down. By this point no one had been recruited to replace either Louis MacNeice after his death from pneumonia in September 1963 (caught whilst producing a radio feature) or the head of the department Laurence Gilliam who was on his deathbed with cancer of the kidneys. The remaining producers were said to be drinking heavily, with Rayner Heppenstall describing how he would arrive at the office "after two lunchtime gin-and-tonics, a large glass of Bulgarian wine, and a drink or two at both the BBC staff club and The George". He was "inclined to sleep in the afternoons".

=== The "new age of radio features" ===
The fluidity of the form continued into the 1970s, with producers like Piers Plowright and John Theocharis - both based in the BBC Drama Department - exploring the "blurred boundary between drama and documentary".

In September 1978, Plowright declared the arrival of a "new age of radio features", forging what media historian David Hendy describes as "a kind of miniaturist style". Plowright produced "closely observed portraits [...] in the hope of starting a few ripples of emotion and thought." It was in this same year that Plowright collaborated with the then head of the Radiophonic Workshop, Desmond Briscoe, to create a 'Seminar on the Imaginative Radio Feature' within the BBC. In a letter to Briscoe after the event, Plowright wrote "I think we may have lit some new fires".

Radio feature-maker Piers Plowright sits with oral historian Studs Terkel in his Chicago living room in 2006

There was, in the 1980s and '90s, David Hendy notes, "a small band of producers [...] committed to the radio feature as something of an art form". Hendy cites Peter Everett's The Ballad of Belle Isle (1980); Plowright's Prix Italia-winning Setting Sail (1985) and Matt Thompson's Touching the Elephant (1997) as examples of "idiosyncratic and richly allusive" work that sat inside a more traditional speech radio broadcasting schedule on BBC Radio 4. These works were a notable departure from the features of the late 1960s and early '70s where producers like Michael Mason had attempted radio of "epic proportions" like 1971's The Long March of Everyman. In his initial outline for that series, Mason had noted the approach should be "spectacular", offering "audio as a total music for the mind and the imagination".

== European feature-making ==
=== International Features Conference 1975–2025 ===
The International Features Conference was first held in Berlin between the 23 and 27 June 1975. It was created by the Swedish feature-maker Ake Blomström, the Belgian feature-maker Andries Poppe and the German feature-maker Peter Leonhard Braun (known as the 'features-pope' on German Wikipedia).

At the time, the three men noted that very few broadcasting organisations had a radio documentary department, with feature-making often held as a "vagrant genre" within radio drama departments. In her essay Thirty Years of the International Radio Feature, accompanying the CD collection of works from the International Features Conference, Virginia Madsen writes that "even within institutionalised and state organised public broadcasting systems, the documentation of the medium and its forms barely exists, a history of amnesia prevails".

The first conference had 16 participants from 14 countries: Belgium, Denmark, Finland, France, Ireland, the former Yugoslavia, Canada, the Netherlands, Norway, Austria, Sweden, Switzerland and the USA; including feature-makers like René Farabet, Zvonimir Bajsic, Karl Schmidt, Knud Ebbesen, Michael Littleton and Alfred Treiber. Peter Leonhard Braun later described its intent as "acoustic emancipation for the radio documentary" and a "vision of cross-border collaboration".

After the arrival of the IFC in the mid to late 1970s, Madsen identifies that, "a radiophonic new wave akin to that of cinéma verité was underway".

After its first iteration in Berlin in 1975, the International Features Conference was held in a different European city each year. After 50 years, the International Features Conference changed its name to the Audio Storytelling Festival. The first iteration of the Audio Storytelling Festival was held in Vilnius, Lithuania; hosted by the Lithuanian broadcaster LRT.

=== Danish feature-making and the montage tradition ===
Danish radio documentary traditions can be traced back to the late 1920s and '30s with Hørebilleder and the notion of 'hear pictures'. From 1946 the Danish state broadcaster (DBC) began to incorporate radio features into its schedule. These features evolved into the montage tradition in Danish Radio. Virginia Madsen, in her essay Transnational Encounters and Peregrinations of the Radio Documentary Imagination, cites the work of Niels Peter Juel Larsen, Willy Reunert, Viggo Clausen and American émigré Stephen Schwartz.

Whilst working on his feature The Night Watchman, Stephen Schwartz developed his own interview technique known as both the 'moments interview' and the 'full Schwartz'.

== Australian feature-making ==
The influence of European feature-making arrived in Australia in the 1970s. The head of ABC Radio Drama and Features, Richard Connolly had used a Churchill Fellowship to explore European radio-making; in France, Germany, Italy and the UK. France Culture's atelier de creation radiophonique in particular had made a strong impression, with Connolly writing in his 1972 Churchill Report that works in that programme paid "attention to the fact that radio is an associative medium" that "operates at various levels like a poem".

Feature-maker Kaye Mortley, in an interview with Virginia Madsen, described being tasked with listening to tapes from the atelier's archive brought back by Connolly to the ABC as her 'radiophonic education'.

== Canadian feature-making ==
Glenn Gould on CBC TV

Since the 1930s, CBC Radio had built a distinctive radio documentary tradition. From World War Two into the 1950s, Virginia Madsen also identifies a "sustained interaction between BBC and CBC Canada in features and drama staff", with figures like John Reeves collaborating with BBC Features' Douglas Cleverdon.

The Canadian pianist Glenn Gould, became fascinated with radio feature-making for the CBC, using montages of sound and voices to create what he called "contrapuntal radio" and "multi-linear voyeurism". He had been frustrated by the style and format of radio documentaries, saying that, "it seemed that one had to accept a linear mold in order to pursue any kind of career in radio at that time. So I was very dissatisfied with the available techniques, and in 1967, for the first time, I got a chance to try my hand at producing something of my own." The New York Review of Books described his work as, "a documentary cross between Bach and electronic music". His most famous radio features form the Solitude Trilogy, most notably The Idea of North.

Other notable Canadian feature-makers include Steve Wadhams and Chris Brookes, both recipients of the Third Coast International Audio Festival's Audio Luminary award – a prize to honour an individual with a "significant and ongoing" contribution to the field of radio. Brookes' radio production studio, Battery Radio, was based "on the cliff where radio, as we know it, was born" - Signal Hill. This was the site where Guglielmo Marconi received the first transatlantic radio transmission in 1901. Although Brookes, in his documentary on the subject and later in an essay for the book Reality Radio: Telling True Stories in Sound, cites research by Dr John Belrose, a physicist at Canada's National Research Council that casts doubt on the claim. Under intense financial pressures, Belrose suggests that Marconi may have misled himself into believing that atmospheric noise was, in fact, morse code of the letter 's' - the message he had been attempting to transmit. Brookes offers a poetic interpretation of what he notes as Marconi's wishful thinking that, "what radio does best is stimulate the imagination [...] the beauty of radio is that the listener actively creates his or her own images with our help. For this reason it's vital to leave space in a program: room for a listener to walk in and take part."

== Ephemerality and the art form ==
Academics and radio producers have discussed how the ephemerality of radio has impacted both its critical understanding and cultural invisibility. In a 2005 interview, the Australian feature-maker Tony Barrell remarked, "It's ephemeral, and that's one of its greatest attributes as well as its greatest drawbacks. It's invisible and once it's gone, it's inaudible. You can't hold up a radio program and look at a bit of it [...] You can't stop it in time. It has to be experienced..."

In 1959, the BBC Radio producer Donald McWhinnie expressed his feeling that, "Sound Radio as a means of artistic expression [...] has often, and unjustly, been regarded as too ephemeral to merit serious consideration." He also identified a, "problem of terminology" where "definitions are far from accurate"; with radio struggling to define a language unique to the art form in the ways in which film, literature or theatre had. The issue of an absent or ambiguous language for the form and the invisibility of its past is something which radio academics, producers and critics are still exploring in the 21st Century.
