= Radio ballad =

The radio ballad is an audio documentary format created by Ewan MacColl, Peggy Seeger, and Charles Parker in 1958. It combines four elements of sound: songs, instrumental music, sound effects, and, most importantly, the recorded voices of those who are the subjects of the radio feature. The latter element was revolutionary; previous radio documentaries had used either professional voice actors or prepared scripts.

== Original radio ballads ==
The original radio ballads were recorded for the BBC. MacColl wrote a variety of songs especially for them, many of which have become folk classics. The trio together made eight radio ballads between 1958 and 1964. They were:

1. The Ballad of John Axon (1958), about an engine driver who died trying to stop a runaway freight train
2. Song of a Road (1959), about the men who built the London-Yorkshire motorway, the M1
3. Singing the Fishing (1960), about the men and women of the herring fishing fleets of East Anglia and Northeast Scotland
4. The Big Hewer (1961), about the miners of the Northumberland, Durham, South Wales and East Midlands coalfields
5. The Body Blow (1962), about people suffering from polio
6. On the Edge (1963), about teenagers in Britain
7. The Fight Game (1963), about boxers
8. The Travelling People (1964), about the nomadic peoples of Ireland and Britain

Singing the Fishing won the Prix Italia for radio documentary in October 1960. All eight radio ballads were released on LP, by Argo Records, and later on CD by Topic Records. As of 2025, the CDs have been deleted from Topic's catalogue. They were also available via Listen Again on the BBC Radio 2 website, but although the site has been preserved the recordings are not available for review.

A book about the making of the radio ballads was published on the fiftieth anniversary of the first broadcast of John Axon. Set into Song: Ewan MacColl, Charles Parker and the Radio Ballads was written and researched by Peter Cox, published by Labatie Books ISBN 978-0-9551877-1-1 and has an extensive website which carries the first two pages of each chapter, the complete transcripts and cast lists for each programme, bibliography, footnotes and reviews.

=== Transmission dates ===
The radio ballads were first broadcast on the BBC Home Service on the following dates:

- The Ballad of John Axon - 2 July 1958
- Song Of A Road - 5 November 1959
- Singing The Fishing - 16 August 1960
- The Big Hewer - 18 August 1961
- The Body Blow - 27 March 1962
- On The Edge - 13 February 1963
- The Fight Game - 3 July 1963
- The Travelling People - 17 April 1964

=== Missing ballads ===
In an unpublished letter to The Guardian, in 1999, Ian Campbell detailed a further two programmes made a year apart, by Parker, with music by Campbell (and John Chapman in the former case), without the involvement of MacColl or Seeger, and broadcast, according to Campbell, "to critical acclaim", then "consigned... to permanent oblivion".

- The Jewellery - about Birmingham's Jewellery Quarter. No programme with this title appears in the Radio Times but an episode of People Today broadcast on the Home Service on 12 April 1962 was produced by Charles Parker so may have been a source of material.
- Cry from the Cut - about the Midlands canal network, broadcast on BBC Home Service Midland, 13 February 1962.

The Radio Times has a listing for two additional Home Service programmes that are described as being or containing radio ballads:

- Over to You, broadcast on 4 May 1965: "[t]his programme includes a short radio-ballad To Make Fisherman by Ewan MacColl, Peggy Seeger, and Charles Parker."
- Ballad and Folk Song: Part 1, broadcast on 18 May 1966: "[a] Radio Ballad by Charles Parker based on Romeo and Juliet re-cast in the language and experience of today with songs and music by Ewan MacColl and Peggy Seeger."

== 2006 radio ballads ==
In 2006, BBC Radio 2 broadcast six new radio ballads using the same format, with musical direction by John Tams, and contributions from Karine Polwart, Jez Lowe and Cara Dillon among others.

The following ballads were broadcast between February and April 2006: The Song of Steel on the decline of the Sheffield and Rotherham Steel Industry (27 February); The Enemy That Lives Within, on HIV/AIDS (6 March); The Horn of the Hunter, on Foxhunting (13 March); Swings and Roundabouts, on Travellers who run fairgrounds (20 March) Thirty Years of Conflict; on The Troubles in Northern Ireland (27 March); and The Ballad of the Big Ships, on the shipyards of the Tyne and the Clyde, (3 April).

All were later released on CD, and a separate CD was also released containing a selection of the songs drawn from across the series.

== 2010 Ballad of the Miners' Strike ==
In 2010, to mark the 25th Anniversary of the 1984-85 Miners' Strike, the BBC broadcast a new Radio Ballad, the Ballad of the Miners' Strike.

== 2012 Olympic Games radio ballads ==
In 2012 BBC Radio 2 broadcast a series of six new radio ballads on the subject of the Olympic Games with original songs from Nancy Kerr, Jez Lowe, Julie Matthews, Martin Simpson and Boo Hewerdine amongst others.

The following ballads were broadcast in July and August 2012: Olympia on the origins of the Olympic Games; Berlin which focused on the 1936 Summer Olympics; Munich on the 1972 Summer Olympics; Controversies; Going for Gold; and The Marathon.

== Raidió Teilifís Éireann ==
On 13 September 2020 RTÉ broadcast The Ballad of the Stolwijk Rescue, possibly the first Irish radio ballad, based around an interview with the last eyewitness to a dramatic rescue from a Dutch shipwreck and the music of Brían Mac Gloinn.

== 2021 The Song of the Golden Road ==
In 2021, west-wales based community arts organisation SPAN Arts, working with community development charity PLANED, and using a grant from the National Lottery Heritage Fund, produced a new radio ballad entitled The Song of the Golden Road (in Welsh, Cân y Ffordd Euraidd). The hour-long piece in English and in Welsh focusses on the bilingual rural communities of the Preseli Hills in north Pembrokeshire.

== 21st Century Folk ==
In January 2023 the BBC released a set of folk songs about five people from the north-east of England, under the title "21st Century Folk". They were described as a "modern take" on the radio ballad.
