= Solitude Trilogy =

Set of Glenn Gould radio documentaries

The Solitude Trilogy is a collection of three hour-long radio features produced by Canadian pianist Glenn Gould (1932–1982) for the Canadian Broadcasting Corporation. Gould produced the documentaries as individual works between 1967 and 1977, then collected them under the title Solitude Trilogy, reflecting the theme of "withdrawal from the world" that unites the pieces. He said that they are "as close to an autobiographical statement as I intend to get in radio".

The three pieces employ Gould's idiosyncratic technique of simultaneously playing the voices of two or more people, each of whom speaks a monologue to an unheard interviewer. Gould called this method "contrapuntal" radio. (The term contrapuntal normally applies to music in which independent melody lines play simultaneously; this type of music, exemplified by J. S. Bach, was the major part of Gould's repertoire.) As he described the format, "every voice leads its own … life and adheres to certain parameters of harmonic discipline … how the voices came together and in what manner they splashed off each other, both in the actual sound and in the meaning of what was being said."

The first and best-known of the documentaries is The Idea of North (1967), which was commissioned by the CBC for the Canadian Centennial. It features five speakers who provide contrasting views of Northern Canada. PBS aired an experimental film based on it in 1970, directed by Judith Pearlman, its first co-production with CBC. To open the documentary, Gould says:

I've long been intrigued by that incredible tapestry of tundra and taiga which constitutes the Arctic and sub-Arctic of our country. I've read about it, written about it, and even pulled up my parka once and gone there. Yet like all but a very few Canadians I've had no real experience of the North. I've remained, of necessity, an outsider. And the North has remained for me, a convenient place to dream about, spin tall tales about, and, in the end, avoid. This programme, however, brings together some remarkable people who have had a direct confrontation with that northern third of Canada, who've lived and worked there and in whose lives the North has played a very vital role.

In 1969, Gould made The Latecomers, about life in Newfoundland outports, and the province's program to encourage residents to urbanize.

The third documentary, 1977's The Quiet in the Land, is a portrait of Russian Mennonites in Winnipeg, Manitoba. The speakers discuss the influence of contemporary society on traditional Mennonite values.

The documentaries employ ambient sound and music. The rumbling of a train is heard frequently in The Idea of North, the ocean in The Latecomers, and a church sermon and choir in The Quiet in the Land. Again referring to music, Gould called these elements ostinatos.

The Idea of North ends with the last movement of Karajan's recording of Sibelius's Symphony no. 5 in E-flat major, the only use of a complete movement from the classical repertoire in the trilogy. Just like the Sibelius symphony ending The Idea of North, The Quiet in the Land can also be said to be in the key of E-flat major, as it uses and sometimes superimposes various pieces in that key: the sarabande from Bach's Cello Suite No. 4 in E-flat, a church hymn, a rehearsal of a choral piece for children's choir and harp ("As Dew in Aprille" from Britten's A Ceremony of Carols), and Janis Joplin's song "Mercedes Benz".
