= Douglas Cleverdon =

English radio producer and bookseller (1903–1987)

Thomas Douglas James Cleverdon (17 January 1903 – 1 October 1987) was an English radio producer and bookseller. In both fields he was associated with numerous leading cultural figures.

== Personal life ==
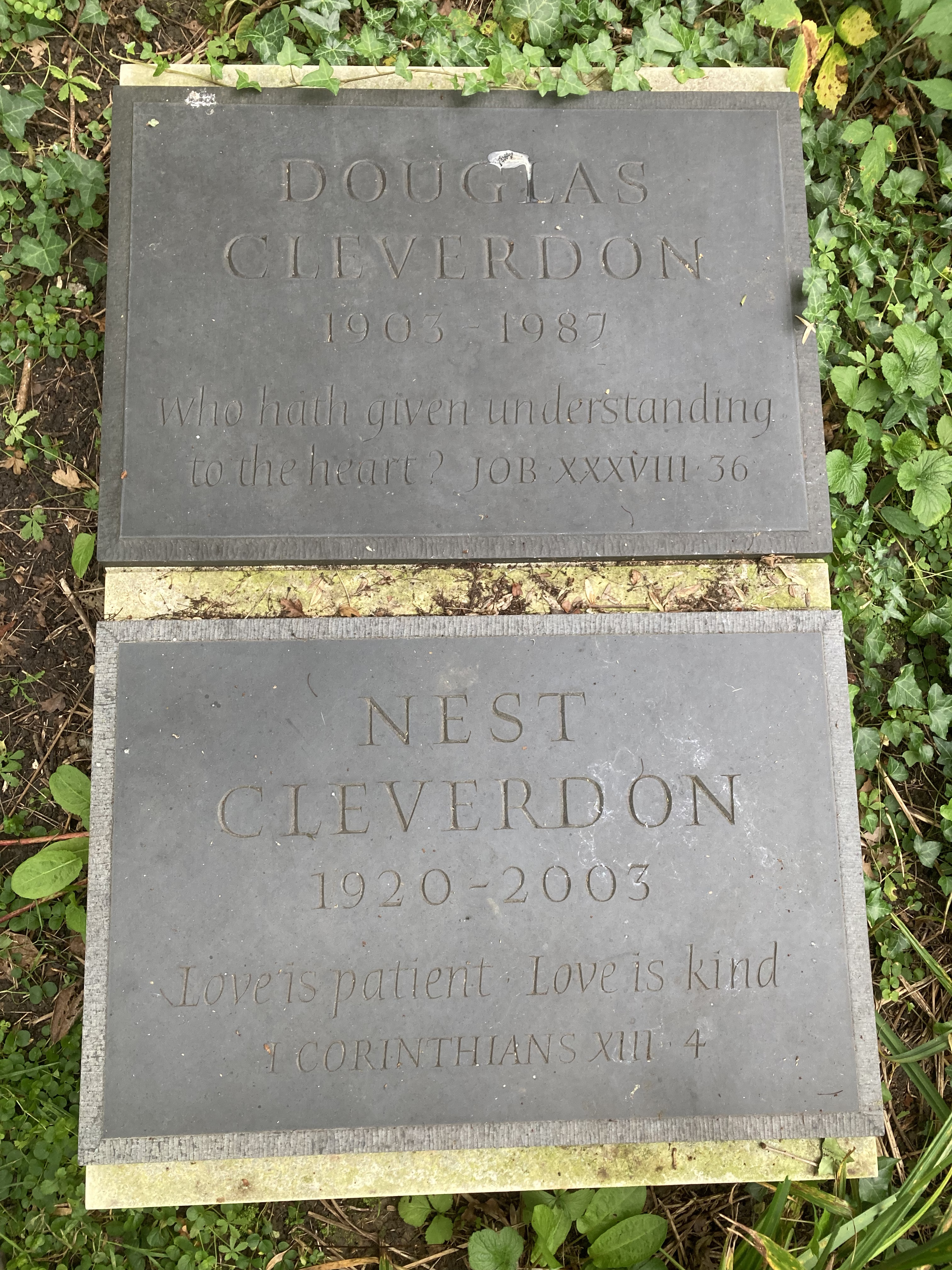
Grave of Douglas and Nest Cleverdon in Highgate Cemetery

He was educated at Bristol Grammar School and Jesus College, Oxford. At Oxford he became friends with John Betjeman, and was taken up by Roger Fry. He then set up a bookshop in Bristol, modelled on the shop Birrell & Garnett in London, with signboards designed by Eric Gill and Roger Fry. The shop specialized in fine printing and first editions from the sixteenth century onward. From there he also published.

He married Elinor Nest Lewis in 1944; she was a secretary at the BBC, and they provided a social focus for producers and performers. The eldest of their three children is Dame Julia Cleverdon.

He was the President of the Double Crown Club in the 1950s.

He died on 1 October 1987, and is buried with Nest on the eastern side of Highgate Cemetery.

== Publishing and Radio work ==
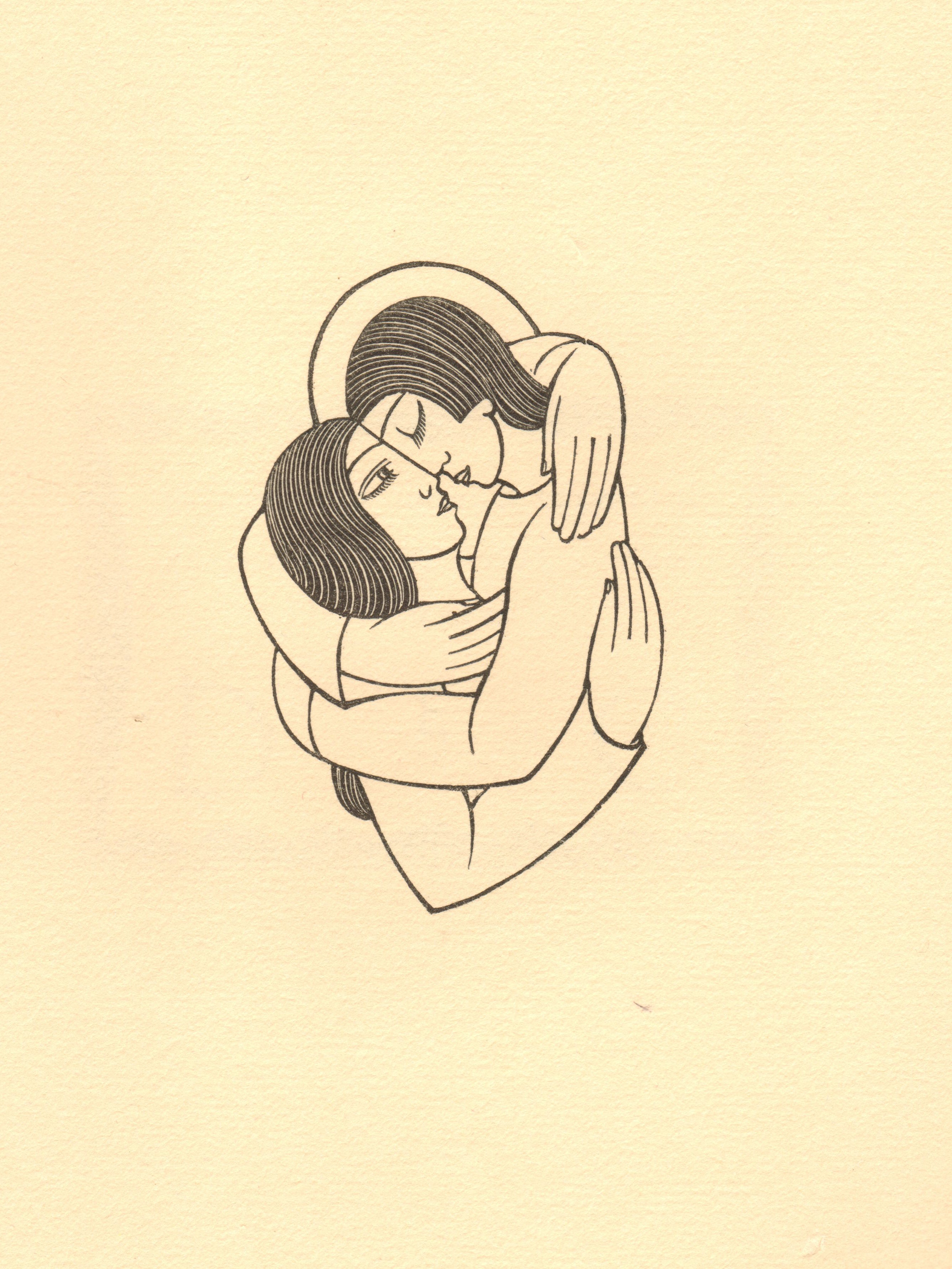
The Soul and the Bridegroom, from Engravings by Eric Gill (1929)

His first book published was a collection of engravings by Eric Gill, who later drew the first version of what would become Gill Sans for him for use on signs and notices for the shop. This was later published by Skelton's Press as a Book of Alphabets for Douglas Cleverdon. In 1927 he commissioned David Jones to make a set of copper engravings for The Rime of the Ancient Mariner. Other books published include Vigils by Siegfried Sassoon, Uncle Doherty by T. F. Powys and Art and Love with engravings by Gill. He published a succession of very finely printed catalogues of books for sale from the bookshop, ranging from early Caxton Press first editions of Jane Austen to modern first editions by E. M. Forster, Virginia Woolf and T. S. Eliot.

In 1939 he joined the BBC, where he co-created The Brains Trust with fellow producer Howard Thomas. From 1945 he was in the BBC Features Department headed by Laurence Gilliam. Later, in 1948, Cleverdon would adapt and produce David Jones's major poem In Parenthesis for radio, with Richard Burton and Dylan Thomas, with music by Elizabeth Poston, for BBC Radio's Third Programme. In 1954 Cleverdon produced Under Milk Wood, the premier of the Dylan Thomas dramatic poem; according to Jenny Abramsky it had taken seven years to persuade Thomas to write it. At around this time he also worked with Henry Reed on the Hilda Tablet cycle of plays.

Cleverdon collected folk songs in the south of England for the BBC in the 1940s.

He produced programmes for them featuring Max Beerbohm, Ted Hughes, Stevie Smith and many other poets. Sylvia Plath wrote Three Women: A Poem for Three Voices for Cleverdon, in March 1962. Cleverdon was a friend and near neighbour of the writer Jillian Becker, who was a friend also of Plath, and it was at Becker's house in Barnsbury Square that Plath spent the last few days of her life. After Plath's suicide, Becker looked after Plath's children until relatives arrived, and Nest Cleverdon supplied extra clothes for them.

The Man Who Collected Sounds was produced by Cleverdon in 1966, with music composed by George Newson with resources from the BBC Radiophonic Workshop. There are at least 232 scripts produced by Cleverdon in the BBC archive.

After leaving the BBC, he was involved with a fine publishing imprint, Clover Hill Editions, which he had established with Will Carter.

== Autobiography ==
- "Fifty Years"; in: The Private Library, 1978. Pinner, Middlesex: Private Libraries Association; pp. 51–83.
