= Third Coast International Audio Festival =

Curation of audio stories

- Status: Conference
- Genre: Festival
- Frequency: Annually
- Locations: Chicago, Illinois
- Country: United States
- Inaugurated: 2001
- Website: www.thirdcoastfestival.org

Founded in 2001 in Chicago, The Third Coast International Audio Festival (TCIAF or TCF) curates radio documentaries and audio stories from around the world and showcases them in various mediums. One of its founders, WBEZ producer Johanna Zorn, said it grew from the absence of American conferences or festivals dedicated to radio documentary and audio storytelling.

Over the years it has taken the form of an in-person industry conference, a public-facing audio festival, an audio awards body and an online sound archive. It has been informally referred to as the "Sundance of Radio". In 2026, Third Coast Festival announced that they were now an entirely volunteer-run organisation.

The festival was affiliated with Chicago Public Radio station WBEZ and from 2004 - 2019 produced the weekly radio show, and later podcast, Re:Sound. Re:Sound was hosted by Gwen Mascai, remixing "audio gems from around the world". Past episode producers have included 99% Invisible's Roman Mars. Gwen Mascai later went on to feature in the 99% Invisible episode Purple Reign, about the first Hyatt hotel in Chicago, which was designed by her father.

The term Third Coast refers to the idea that while the U.S. population tends to be concentrated near the east and west coasts, Chicago, lying on the shores of Lake Michigan, is the country's third largest city.

== Conference ==
Around 200 people attended the first in-person conference in 2001. Its most recent in-person conference in 2019 was attended by 800 people, with a digital iteration - Third Place - happening in 2020 due to the ongoing Covid pandemic.

Speakers at TCIAF's annual conference have included Jay Allison, Jad Abumrad, Joe Frank, Ira Glass, Piers Plowright, Robert Krulwich, Studs Terkel, the Kitchen Sisters, and Nancy Updike.

In 2016, TCIAF launched a podcast for selected conference sessions called Third Coast Pocket Conference. It was produced by Dennis Funk and ran until 2019, featuring sessions from Jad Abumrad, Sandhya Dirks, Ira Glass, Nikole Hannah-Jones, Third Ear's Tim Hinman, Rikke Houd, Chana Joffe-Walt, Chenjerai Kumanyika, and The Kitchen Sisters.

== Audio Luminary Award ==
Between its founding in 2001 and 2008, the Third Coast International Audio Festival gave out seven Audio Luminary awards (initially named Lifetime Achievement Awards) to "honour individuals with significant, ongoing, and visionary contributions to the field of radio and audio storytelling". The recipients were the American broadcaster Studs Terkel (2002), the NPR journalist and broadcaster Susan Stamberg (2004), American radio producer and writer Norman Corwin (2005), CBC radio producer and co-founder of Radio's EAR (Experimental Audio Room) Steve Wadhams (2005), BBC radio feature-maker Piers Plowright (2006), German radio producer Peter Leonhard Braun (2007) and CBC radio feature-maker Chris Brookes (2008).
