= Peter Leonhard Braun =

German writer and radio producer (born 1929)

Peter Leonhard Braun (born 11 February 1929) is a German writer and radio feature-maker.

== Education ==
1936 – 1947 Primary and Secondary School (Gymnasium) in Berlin, Matriculation 1949 – 1953 Freie Universität Berlin, Political Economics Diploma thesis: On Sociology of Radio;Bachelor of Economics

== Professional development ==
1953 – 1973 Freelance author and producer in Berlin, Paris (1963) and London (1964 & 1965) exclusively for radio features Trensetter for the „Acoustical Film“, interweaving narration and stereo sound to documentary sound sculptures

== Important productions ==
1967: Chickens, first stereophonic feature production in Germany 1968: Catch as catch can (professional wrestling) 1970: 08h15, Operation theatre 3, hip replacement 1971: Hyenas, Plea for a despised predator 1973: Bells in Europe Range of broadcasts in fifteen languages as trendsetters, radio bestsellers and finally, classics of the „acoustical emancipation“. 1974 – 1994 Sender Freies Berlin – SFB, Berlin Head of the Feature Department, Radio Teaching activity of feature department in Africa, Asia, USA, South America and Europe until 1994. The Department Radio won 70 awards.

== Positions held in the broadcasting industry ==
1973 – 1995 Organization and management of the International Feature Conference (annual world conference of feature makers) 1979 – 1983 Responsible for radio in the international competition Prix Futura, Berlin 1983 – 1997 Secretary General of Prix Futura Berlin, responsible for Radio and Television 1988 – 1997 Management of Prix Europa, pan-European Television contest 1997 – 2000 After the merger of the two competitions, Operative Management of the competition under its new name Prix Europa 2000 – present Treasurer of the Prix Europa and responsible for radio within the competition

== Awards ==
1964 Kurt-Magnus-Price 1969 Stereo-Price for Catch as catch can 1973 PRIX ITALIA for Bells in Europe 1974 URTNA-Award for Hyenas (Arabian version) 1974 ONDAS-Award for Bells in Europe (Spanish version)

2007 AUDIO LUMINARY AWARD for lifelong merits from the Third Coast Festival in Chicago 2012 AXEL-EGGEBRECHT-EHRENPREIS for lifelong merits from the Medienstiftung Leipzig.
