= Piers Plowright =

British radio producer (1937–2021)

Piers Plowright in Abersoch, while recording the BBC Radio 4 series Stepping Stones, a programme that explored five different sound worlds from his life.

Piers Plowright (30 December 1937 – 23 July 2021) was a British radio feature-maker. Plowright was born in Hampstead, London, to Molly (née Mary Eugster) and Oliver Plowright. He attended Stowe School and then undertook national service in Malaya before returning to the UK and studying history at Christ Church, Oxford, graduating in 1962. He subsequently taught for the British Council in Borneo, Iran and Sudan. He started working for the BBC as a trainee producer in 1968 and remained there until his retirement in 1997.

Plowright was a three-times winner of the Prix Italia for radio drama and documentaries, and was also awarded three gold and two silver Sony Awards, plus the Sony Special Award for his work in radio. In 1998, he was made a fellow of the Royal Society of Literature. In his history of BBC Radio 4, Life On Air, author David Hendy described Plowright's work as "closely observed portraits gently lobbed in the listeners' direction in the hope of starting a few ripples of emotion and thought".

Between 1999 and 2017, Plowright provided the opening lecture for the School of Sound international symposium. His lectures touched on the connections between radio and film, the power and ambiguity of sound, the connection between music and meaning, the use of silence and the pictures that sound creates.

Radio feature-maker Piers Plowright sits with oral historian Studs Terkel in his Chicago living room in 2006

In 2002, he presented Ways of Hearing - a BBC Four discussion programme on the nature and importance of sound, in dialogue with the film director Mike Leigh, sound artist Bill Furlong and composer Simon Fisher-Turner.

In 2006, Plowright was awarded the Third Coast International Audio Festival Audio Luminary prize for his "significant and ongoing contributions to the field of radio."

Plowright was married to Royal Holloway theatre academic Lim Poh Sim (Poh Sim Plowright), with whom he had three children.
