= Doctor Who specials (2013) =

2013 specials of British sci-fi TV series

Doctor Who
- 2013 specials
- DVD box set cover art
- Showrunner: Steven Moffat
- Starring: Matt Smith; Jenna Coleman; David Tennant; Billie Piper; John Hurt; Paul McGann
- No. of stories: 2
- No. of episodes: 2

Release
- Original network: BBC One
- Original release: 23 November – 25 December 2013

Season chronology
- ← Previous; Series 7 Next → Series 8

The 2013 specials of the British science fiction television programme Doctor Who are two additional episodes following the programme's seventh series. In addition to the traditional Christmas episode broadcast on 25 December 2013, a feature of the revived series since 2005, there was also a special celebrating the 50th anniversary of the programme broadcast on 23 November 2013, both airing on BBC One.

Production of "The Day of the Doctor" began on 2 April 2013, and production of the Christmas episode, "The Time of the Doctor", began in September. Two supplemental episodes were also filmed alongside the specials; "The Night of the Doctor" (which featured the return of Paul McGann as the Eighth Doctor for the first time since 1996.) and "The Last Day" were both produced as lead-in mini-episodes for the 50th anniversary special, and were released online days before the special's broadcast. The two special broadcast episodes were initially released in separate home media sets, before being released together alongside the mini-episodes in a collector's boxset.

Both episodes starred Matt Smith as the Eleventh Doctor and Jenna Coleman as Clara Oswald. The 50th-anniversary special, "The Day of the Doctor" also starred David Tennant, Billie Piper, and John Hurt. It also featured a special cameo from Tom Baker who played the Fourth Doctor as The Curator, a potential future incarnation of the Doctor. "The Time of the Doctor" saw the departure of Smith from the series and the introduction of Peter Capaldi as the Twelfth Doctor.

== Episodes ==
"The Day of the Doctor" features the return of the Zygons for the first time since Terror of the Zygons in 1975. "The Time of the Doctor" draws together a number of plot threads that have run through the series since the Eleventh Doctor's first episode in 2010.

| No. story | No. special | Title | Directed by | Written by | Original release date | UK viewers (millions) | AI |
|---|---|---|---|---|---|---|---|
| 240 | 1 | "The Day of the Doctor" | Nick Hurran | Steven Moffat | 23 November 2013 | 12.80 | 88 |
The Eleventh Doctor and Clara are called in by UNIT to investigate mysterious three-dimensional paintings, including one depicting the Time War of Gallifrey. In the war, the War Doctor, a previously unknown incarnation of the Doctor, plans to use an ancient weapon called "The Moment" to end the ongoing war between Time Lords and Daleks. The Moment, knowing the disasters its use will cause, shows the War Doctor how its use will affect him by uniting him with the Eleventh Doctor, as well as the Tenth Doctor. Together, the three Doctors are able to end a Zygon invasion by enacting peace between Zygons and humans. Though the Doctors still contemplate using the Moment anyway, Clara convinces them to try another way to end the war. Uniting with all their previous and future incarnations, the Doctors use their TARDISes to trap Gallifrey in a pocket universe. In the aftermath, the Tenth and War Doctors return to their own times, with the War Doctor regenerating into the Ninth Doctor, and the Eleventh Doctor is told by the mysterious, but very familiar Curator that it is his mission to find Gallifrey, which the Doctor vows to do.
| 241 | 2 | "The Time of the Doctor" | Jamie Payne | Steven Moffat | 25 December 2013 | 11.14 | 83 |
A message echoing through all of time and space emanates from the farming town of Christmas on the planet Trenzalore, where a prophecy states the Doctor will spend the last of his years. With the help of the Papal Mainframe, the Doctor and Clara travel to the village and discover that the message is being sent from Gallifrey by the Time Lords. Sending Clara home, he proceeds to spend hundreds of years fighting and defending Trenzalore against hordes of aliens determined to prevent the Time Lords from returning. Clara returns to find the Daleks are the last remaining aliens, and that the Doctor has fought for so long, with no more regenerations, that he is on the cusp of dying of old age. As the Doctor faces his last stand, Clara convinces the Time Lords to give the Doctor a new regeneration cycle. The Doctor begins to regenerate, destroying the Daleks and ending the war. Clara returns to the TARDIS to find a rejuvenated Doctor about to finish his regeneration. After vowing to remember the incarnation he was and hallucinating a final goodbye to Amy Pond, he finally regenerates into the Twelfth Doctor, as the TARDIS suddenly begins crashing.

=== Supplemental episodes ===
| Title | Directed by | Written by | Original release date |
|---|---|---|---|
| "The Night of the Doctor" | John Hayes | Steven Moffat | 14 November 2013 (online); 16 November 2013 (BBC Red Button) |
The Eighth Doctor is forced to join the conflict of the Time War by the Sisterhood of Karn. He is killed while trying to save a woman affected by the war, the Sisterhood revive him so that he can regenerate, allowing him to choose his next form, a warrior that must make the darkest sacrifice of his life in order to be reborn.
| "The Last Day" | Jamie Stone | Steven Moffat | 19 November 2013 (online); 2 December 2013 (home video release) |
A soldier of Gallifrey defends the city of Arcadia, undergoing initiation through the use of a headcam. In the midst of his training, the impossible happens when Daleks invade.

== Casting ==
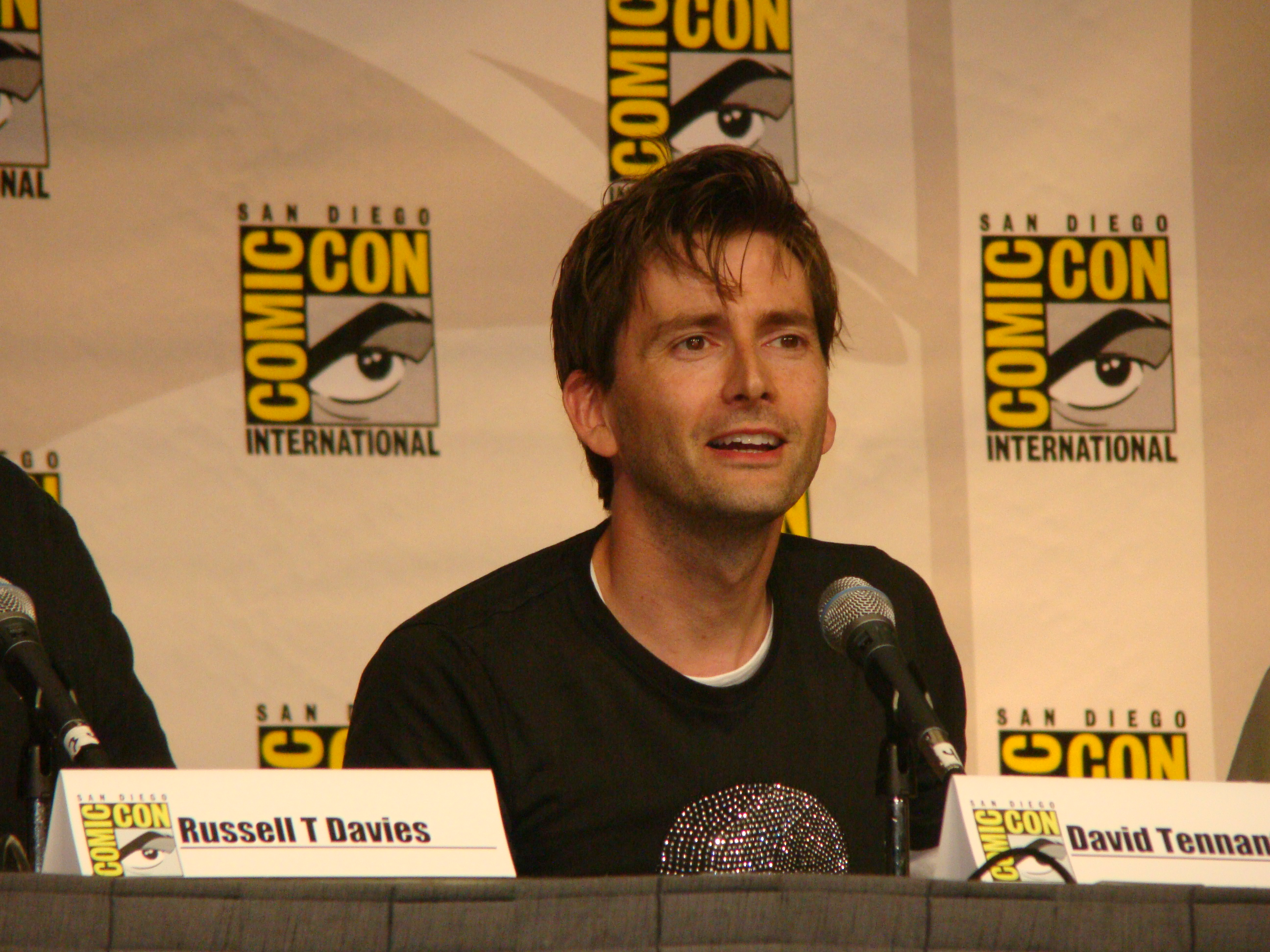
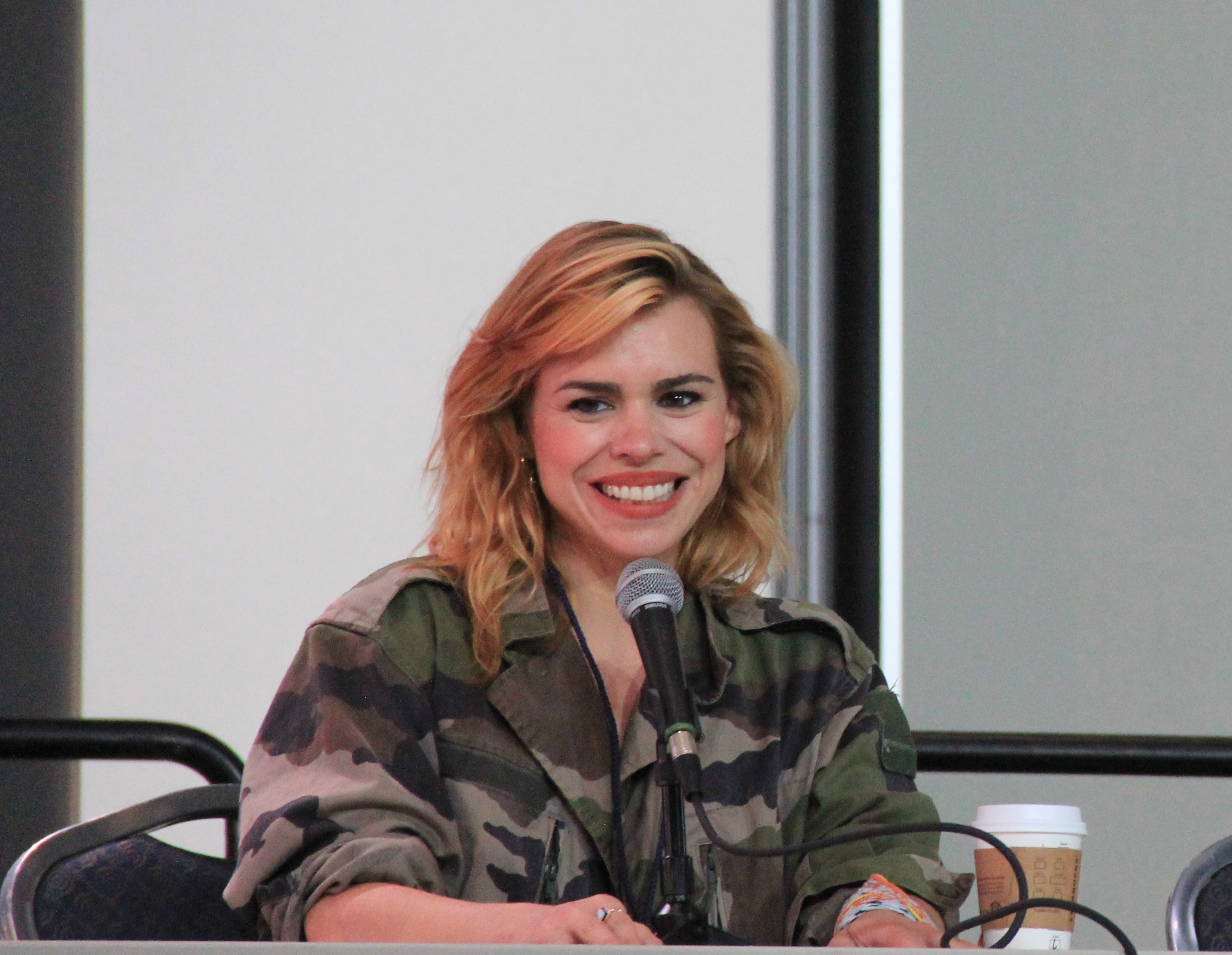
Both David Tennant and Billie Piper returned to appear in the 50th anniversary special.

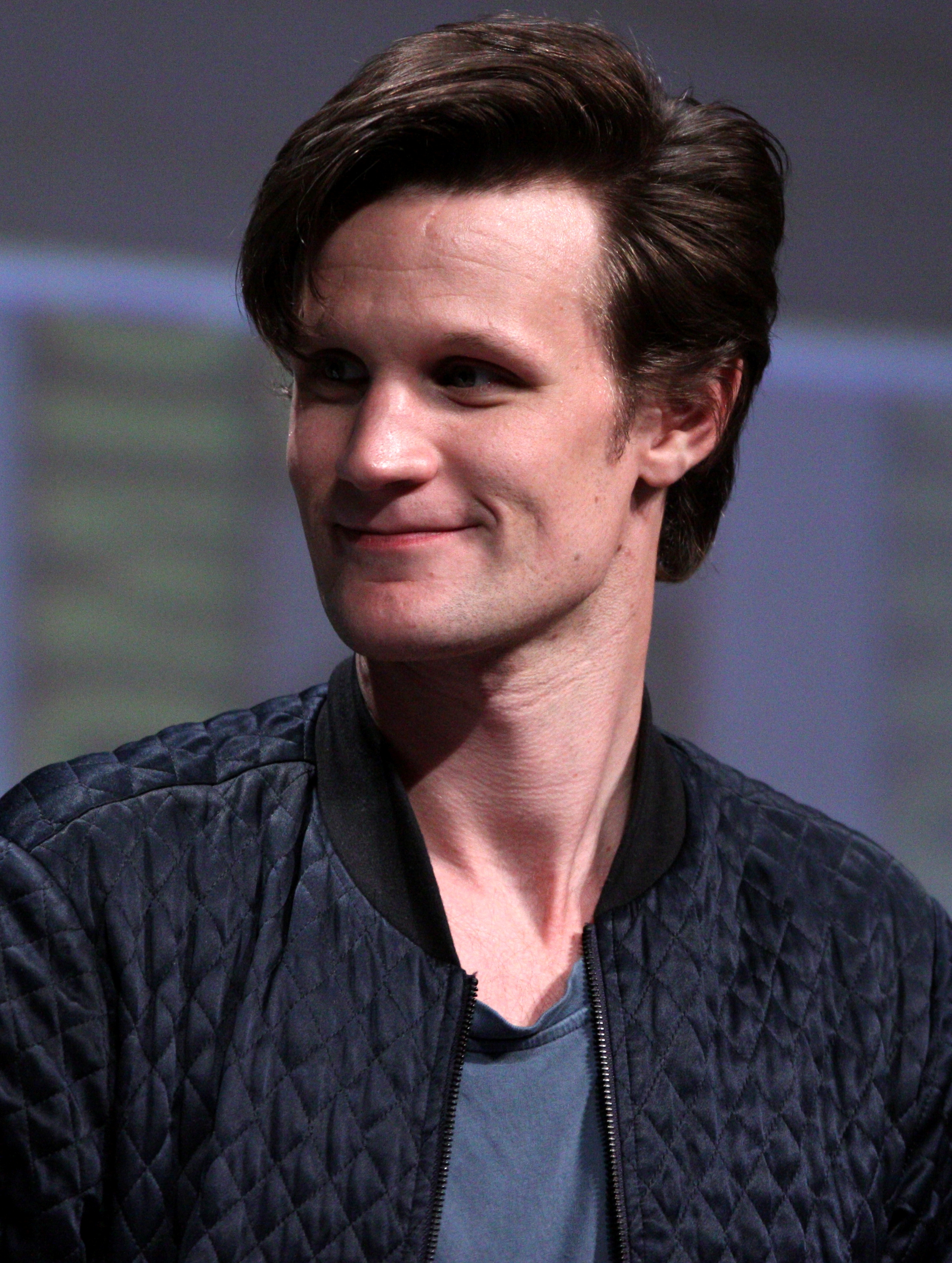
"The Time of the Doctor" is Matt Smith's last regular appearance as the Eleventh Doctor.

In "The Day of the Doctor", Smith and Coleman star alongside David Tennant and Billie Piper; Tennant reprised his role as the Tenth Doctor, while Piper, although credited as playing Rose Tyler, in fact portrays a manifestation of "The Moment", a Gallifreyan super-weapon, that has taken on Rose's form. The casting of Tennant and Piper was announced by the BBC on 30 March 2013. Photographs of Smith, Tennant and Coleman at the first read-through were published, which also confirmed the casting of Joanna Page. On 8 April 2013, the BBC announced that Jemma Redgrave would reprise her role as Brigadier Lethbridge-Stewart's daughter Kate Stewart from "The Power of Three". Rumours had also circulated that Christopher Eccleston would have some involvement; Eccleston had some discussions with Steven Moffat, but eventually declined to return as the Ninth Doctor. Despite claiming that it would be "a travesty" if his character did not feature in the special, John Barrowman did not feature as Captain Jack Harkness. Sylvester McCoy, who played the Seventh Doctor, claimed that none of the surviving actors who portrayed the Doctor prior to Eccleston had been contacted regarding the special. The release of "The Night of the Doctor" on 14 November revealed that Paul McGann had returned to portray the Eighth Doctor.

On 1 June 2013, Matt Smith announced that he would be leaving Doctor Who, with his final episode being the 2013 Christmas Special, with that episode set to feature the Doctor's latest regeneration. Speculation about the identity of the actor set to take over began immediately, with a number of names suggested. The official announcement of the actor of the Twelfth Doctor was made in a special live simulcast on 4 August 2013 in Doctor Who Live: The Next Doctor, and saw confirmation of Peter Capaldi in the role. The 2013 special is the fourth and final Christmas episode to feature Matt Smith's incarnation of the Doctor, and the second to feature Jenna Coleman as Clara Oswald.

== Production ==
=== Writing ===
The [Christmas] special ties up stuff from all corners of Matt's tenure – there are things I set in motion in Matt's very first episode that I'm paying off now. It's been a long game, but most of the questions that people ask will be answered...

— Steven Moffat

Moffat was developing ideas for the 50th anniversary episode as early as late 2011, when he stated that the team "knew what [they] want[ed] to do" and were "revving up" for the episode in an interview discussing his work on the 2011 film The Adventures of Tintin, and began writing the script for "The Day of the Doctor" in late 2012, announcing that, as a security precaution, he had not produced any copies, instead keeping it on his computer until it was needed.

Moffat has stated that the Christmas episode is intended to tie together the remaining story strands from the Eleventh Doctor era, some of which were introduced as far back as "The Eleventh Hour", Smith's first episode as the Eleventh Doctor.

In September 2013, it was revealed that the Cybermen would feature in the Christmas episode, when one of the show's regular stunt artists tweeted that she would be playing a Cyberman.

=== Music ===
Murray Gold composed the soundtrack to these episodes, with orchestration by Ben Foster.

=== Filming ===
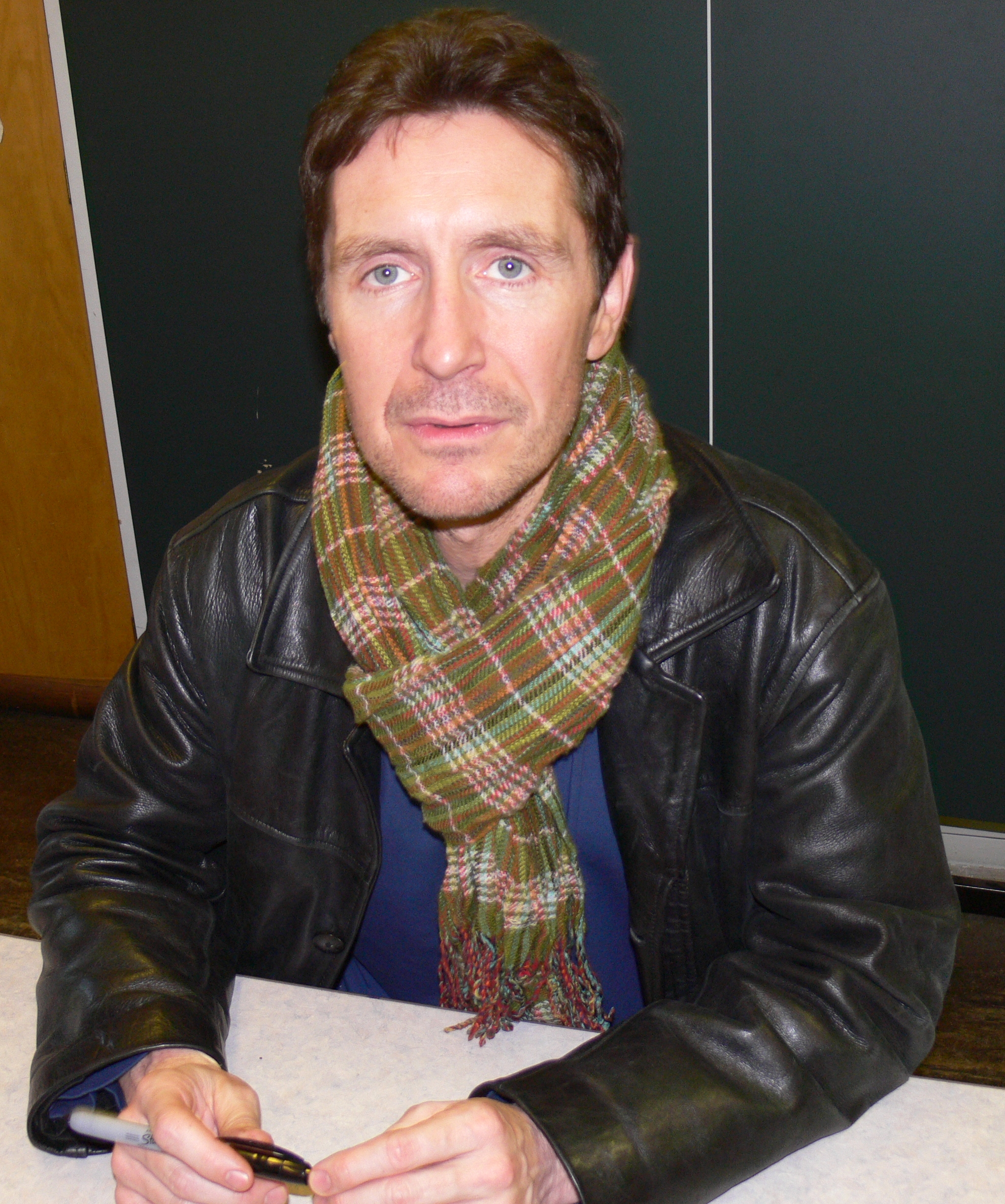
Paul McGann made his first on-screen appearance as the Doctor since 1996.

On 2 April 2013, principal photography on "The Day of the Doctor" began. In early April, David Tennant, Billie Piper, John Hurt and Joanna Page were seen at a location outside Neath in South Wales. Filming later took place involving Matt Smith and Jenna Coleman in Trafalgar Square in London. Various other locations included Chepstow (with some filming done inside the castle), and Cardiff – scenes shot in Cardiff are intended to represent both Totter's Lane and Coal Hill School. Shooting wrapped on 5 May 2013. The final two days of production were used for shooting the special mini-episode, "The Night of the Doctor", which featured Paul McGann returning to the role of the Eighth Doctor for the first time since 1996.

At the 2013 Comic-Con, Matt Smith confirmed that production of the Christmas episode would begin in September, once his work on How to Catch a Monster was complete. Filming for "The Time of the Doctor" began on 8 September. On 10 September, Matt Smith and Jenna Coleman were seen filming on location at Lydstep Flats in Cardiff, which have previously been used in Series 1 and 2 as the Powell Estate where Rose Tyler lived with her mother Jackie. On 19 September 2013, scenes were filmed in the evening at Puzzlewood with fake snow being scattered over certain areas. On 5 October 2013, Doctor Who producer Marcus Wilson revealed via Twitter that filming was complete.

| Block | Episode(s) | Director | Writer(s) | Producer |
|---|---|---|---|---|
| 1 | Anniversary special: "The Day of the Doctor" | Nick Hurran | Steven Moffat | Marcus Wilson |
| 2 | Christmas special: "The Time of the Doctor" | Jamie Payne | Steven Moffat | Marcus Wilson |

== Release ==
=== Broadcast ===
The BBC broadcast "The Day of the Doctor" in 94 countries simultaneously, to avoid plot leaks. It earned a Guinness World Record for the world's largest ever simulcast of a TV drama. The episode aired in over 100 countries on either 23 or 24 November 2013 in cinemas and on television.

"The Time of the Doctor" was broadcast in the United Kingdom on BBC One on Christmas Day 2013. It was also shown on 25 December in the United States on BBC America, and in Canada on Space. In Australia it aired on 26 December on ABC1, and in New Zealand, it screened on Prime Television during Boxing Day evening with 106,390 viewers.

=== 50th anniversary ===
==== An Adventure in Space and Time ====
In addition to the 50th anniversary episode featuring Matt Smith and David Tennant, a further special was produced to celebrate Doctor Who's half-century. An Adventure in Space and Time, written by Mark Gatiss, was a feature-length docudrama detailing the conception and initial production of Doctor Who. It featured David Bradley as William Hartnell and Reece Shearsmith as Patrick Troughton; Matt Smith has a cameo as himself in his Eleventh Doctor costume.

==== The Five(ish) Doctors Reboot ====
As a complement to "The Day of the Doctor", Peter Davison wrote and directed a 30-minute spoof entitled The Five(ish) Doctors Reboot featuring himself, Colin Baker and Sylvester McCoy attempting to gain parts in the 50th anniversary episode. Produced in mid 2013, the film first became apparent when images of the three staging a "protest" outside BBC Television Centre came out. In addition to Davison, Baker and McCoy, the film featured cameos from a host of people connected with Doctor Who, including Paul McGann, David Tennant, Matt Smith, Steven Moffat, Russell T Davies and John Barrowman, with David and Georgia Tennant's children also guest starring; Georgia is the daughter of the Fifth Doctor actor Peter Davison, and played The Doctor's clone daughter Jenny in the episode "The Doctor's Daughter" under her maiden name "Moffett".

==== Other television productions ====
"The Day of the Doctor" formed the centerpiece of the celebrations, which encompassed programmes across all of the BBC's platforms, including An Adventure in Space and Time, a Culture Show special entitled "Me, You and Doctor Who" presented by Matthew Sweet that explores the wider cultural significance of the show. CBBC broadcast a show called "12 Again" in which past and present stars of the show recounted their memories, Professor Brian Cox delivered a televised lecture on the science of Doctor Who, and BBC Three had a weekend devoted to Monsters and Villains, as well as showing "Doctor Who: The Ultimate Guide". The BBC also announced plans to show a newly restored print of the first serial An Unearthly Child. The announcement of the title was also followed by the release of the first official poster for the special.

UKTV's Watch showed a story from each doctor to celebrate the 50th anniversary, based around the broadcast of the eleven part BBC America series, The Doctors Revisited. This series has one episode dedicated to each incarnation of the Doctor, and was broadcast monthly alongside an omnibus edition of a serial of each Doctor. Watch broadcast two episodes per weekend, starting on 12 October.

The British Film Institute ran a year long celebration of the 50th anniversary with monthly screenings of stories from each Doctor, culminating in November with screenings of both "The Day of the Doctor" and An Adventure in Space and Time.

| The Doctors Revisited | | | | BFI Screenings | |
| Doctor | Serial | US Date | UK Date | Serial | Screening Date |
|---|---|---|---|---|---|
| First | The Aztecs | 27 January | 12 October | An Unearthly Child | 12 January |
| Second | The Tomb of the Cybermen | 24 February | 13 October | The Tomb of the Cybermen | 9 February |
| Third | Spearhead from Space | 31 March | 19 October | The Mind of Evil | 10 March |
| Fourth | Pyramids of Mars | 28 April | 20 October | The Robots of Death | 20 April |
| Fifth | Earthshock | 26 May | 26 October | The Caves of Androzani | 4 May |
| Sixth | Vengeance on Varos | 29 June | 27 October | The Two Doctors | 15 June |
| Seventh | Remembrance of the Daleks | 27 July | —N/a | Remembrance of the Daleks | 27 July |
| Seventh | Battlefield | —N/a | 2 November | Remembrance of the Daleks | 27 July |
| Eighth | Doctor Who | 31 August | 3 November | Doctor Who | 5 October |
| Ninth | "Bad Wolf" / "The Parting of the Ways" | 29 September | 9 November | "Bad Wolf" / "The Parting of the Ways" | 24 August |
| Tenth | "The Stolen Earth" / "Journey's End" | 27 October | —N/a | "The Stolen Earth" / "Journey's End" | 29 September |
| Tenth | "Silence in the Library" / "Forest of the Dead" | —N/a | 10 November | "The Stolen Earth" / "Journey's End" | 29 September |
| Eleventh | "The Impossible Astronaut" / "Day of the Moon" | 24 November | 16 November | "The Eleventh Hour" | 8 December |
| Eleventh | "The Impossible Astronaut" / "Day of the Moon" | 24 November | 16 November | "The Name of the Doctor" | 8 December |

==== Radio and audio ====
BBC Radio 2 broadcast a number of specials to commemorate the show, including a 90-minute documentary titled "Who is the Doctor?", a half-hour segment hosted by David Quantick and titled "The Blagger's Guide to Doctor Who", and Graham Norton's live Saturday show was broadcast from the Doctor Who Celebration event at the ExCel. BBC Radio 1 looked at the phenomenon of "Time Lord Rock", a musical style derived from the music of the show, while BBC Radio 4 Extra broadcast a three-hour special called "Who Made Who", which discussed the world that inspired the show.

In October, Big Finish Productions released a 50th anniversary special audio drama featuring the Fourth through Eighth Doctors entitled The Light at the End.

=== Home media ===
"The Day of the Doctor" was released as a standalone DVD and Blu-ray on 2 December 2013 in the United Kingdom, 4 December in Australia, and 10 December in the United States. An Adventure in Space and Time was released on DVD on 2 December in the United Kingdom and 11 December in Australia, and as a DVD/Blu-ray combo in the United States on 27 May 2014. "The Time of the Doctor" was released on DVD and Blu-ray on 20 January 2014 in the United Kingdom, 22 January in Australia and 4 March in the United States. A complete box set was released on 8 September 2014 in the United Kingdom and 10 September in Australia on DVD and Blu-ray.

- ^{(D)} indicates a DVD release for a specific date
- ^{(B)} indicates a Blu-ray release
- ^{(D,B)} indicates a simultaneous DVD and Blu-ray release
- ^{(D,3D)} indicates a simultaneous DVD and 3D Blu-ray (includes Blu-ray) release

| Series | Story no. | Episode name | Duration | Release date | | |
| Series | Story no. | Episode name | Duration | R2 | R4 | R1 |
|---|---|---|---|---|---|---|
| 2013 specials | 240 | Doctor Who : The Day of the Doctor "The Day of the Doctor" "The Night of the Doctor" "The Last Day" | 1 × 77 min. 1 × 7 min. 1 × 3 min. | 2 December 2013^{(D,3D)} | 4 December 2013^{(D,B)} | 10 December 2013^{(D,B)} |
| 2013 specials | 213, 225, 231, 241 | Doctor Who : The Time of the Doctor & Other Eleventh Doctor Christmas Specials "The Time of the Doctor" "A Christmas Carol" "The Doctor, the Widow and the Wardrobe" "The Snowmen" | 4 × 60 min. | 20 January 2014^{(D,B)} | 22 January 2014^{(D,B)} | —N/a |
| 2013 specials | 241 | Doctor Who : "The Time of the Doctor" | 1 × 60 min. | —N/a | —N/a | 4 March 2014^{(D,B)} |
| 2013 specials | 239–241 | Doctor Who : 50th Anniversary Collector's Edition "The Name of the Doctor" "The Day of the Doctor" "The Time of the Doctor" "The Night of the Doctor" "The Last Day"; An Adventure in Space and Time; The Five(ish) Doctors Reboot; Doctor Who: The Ultimate Guide; Doctor Who Prom (2013) | 1 × 45 min. 1 × 77 min. 1 × 60 min. 1 × 7 min. 1 × 3 min. 1 × 90 min. 1 × 30 min. 1 × 120 min. 1 × 70 min. | 8 September 2014^{D,B)} Not Region Locked | 10 September 2014^{(D,B)} | —N/a |
| 5, 6, 7, 2013 specials | 203–241 | Doctor Who: The Complete Matt Smith Years | 30 × 45 min. 7 × 50 min. 1 × 55 min. 4 × 60 min. 1 × 65 min. 1 × 77 min. | —N/a | —N/a | 4 November 2014^{(B)} 2 October 2018^{(D)} |

== In print ==
| Series | Story no. | Novelisation title | Author | Original publisher | Paperback release date | Audiobook | |
| Series | Story no. | Novelisation title | Author | Original publisher | Paperback release date | Release date (Note: Unabridged from BBC Audio / AudioGo unless otherwise indicated) | Narrator |
|---|---|---|---|---|---|---|---|
| 2013 specials | 240 | The Day of the Doctor (Note: Also adapts "The Night of the Doctor") | Steven Moffat | BBC Books (Target collection) | 5 April 2018 | 7 June 2018 | Nicholas Briggs |

== Reception ==
=== Ratings ===
The ratings for "The Day of the Doctor" rose to a total of 12.8 million viewers, which makes it the highest rating since "The Next Doctor" (2008), which had a total of 13.1 million viewers. For the week, it was the number one most-watched series on British television, a feat only two other Doctor Who episodes had ever achieved. "The Time of the Doctor" was the second most watched programme of the entire day across all channels, with the final 5 minutes (the regeneration from Smith to Capaldi) receiving the largest peak viewers of the day with 10.2 million. The final viewing figures for the episode were 11.14 million viewers, making it the fifth most watched Doctor Who Christmas special.

| No. | Title | Air date | Overnight ratings | | Consolidated ratings | | Total viewers (millions) | AI | Ref(s) |
| No. | Title | Air date | Viewers (millions) | Rank | Viewers (millions) | Rank | Total viewers (millions) | AI | Ref(s) |
|---|---|---|---|---|---|---|---|---|---|
| 1 | "The Day of the Doctor" | 23 November 2013 | 10.20 | 2 | 2.6 | 1 | 12.80 | 88 | |
| 2 | "The Time of the Doctor" | 25 December 2013 | 8.29 | 2 | 2.85 | 3 | 11.14 | 83 | |

=== Critical reception ===
Ben Lawrence of The Daily Telegraph gave "The Day of the Doctor" five stars, calling it "charming, eccentric and very, very British." Den of Geek's Simon Brew praised the special, calling it "terrific", and stating that it was "pulsating with comedy, ambition, and top to bottom entertainment." The Guardian's Viv Grospok criticised various elements of the episode, though concluded that "it was all worth it."

Dan Martin of The Guardian praised "The Time of the Doctor" as "awfully good". He wrote that Steven Moffat had "performed the fourth remix of the show's mythology in a row, tying up strands that date back to the beginning of Matt Smith's run." He added, "Perfectly, the rebooting of his regeneration cycle was done simply... Who could have guessed the Doctor's renewed regeneration cycle would be dealt with as simply as his best friend just asking nicely?" Mark Snow of IGN gave the episode a score of 8.4, "GREAT", writing that "'The Time of the Doctor' was an exemplary exercise in celebrating the departure of a loved one. If you managed to stay dry-eyed during the Doctor's goodbye to Clara (itself a not-entirely-transparent goodbye from Smith to the role he embodied), then you should probably double check your heart's still working," also lauding Karen Gillan's "rather crowd-pleasing, tear-inducing cameo". While criticising its "rapid, almost breathless pace", he concluded, "It was a melancholic yet ultimately merry end to one of the show's best Doctors to date."

=== Awards and nominations ===
| Year | Award | Category | Nominee(s) | Result | Ref(s) |
|---|---|---|---|---|---|
| 2014 | BAFTA Awards | Radio Times Audience Award | "The Day of the Doctor" | Won | |
| 2014 | Constellation Awards | Best Male Performance in a 2013 Science Fiction Television Episode | Matt Smith in "The Time of the Doctor" | Nominated | |
| 2014 | Hugo Awards | Hugo Award for Best Dramatic Presentation (Short Form) | "The Day of the Doctor" | Nominated | |

== Soundtrack ==
Selected pieces of score from "The Day of the Doctor" and "The Time of the Doctor", as composed by Murray Gold, were released on 24 November 2014 by Silva Screen Records. "The Day of the Doctor" includes 23 pieces, whereas "The Time of the Doctor" includes 18 pieces.

Doctor Who: The Day of the Doctor / The Time of the Doctor

Soundtrack album by Murray Gold, Ben Foster and the BBC National Orchestra of Wales
- Released: 24 November 2014
- Recorded: 20 September 2013 (Disc 1); 3 December 2013 (Disc 2)
- Genre: Soundtrack
- Length: 93:10
- Label: Silva Screen Records
- Producer: Murray Gold

Doctor Who soundtrack chronology
| Cold Worlds (2014) | ''Doctor Who: The Day of the Doctor / The Time of the Doctor'' (2014) | Series 8 (2015) |

Alternate cover

Disc 1 - "The Day of the Doctor"
| No. | Title | Length |
|---|---|---|
| 1. | "I.M. Foreman" | 1:10 |
| 2. | "Will There Be Cocktails?" | 0:40 |
| 3. | "It's Him (The Majestic Tale)" | 2:05 |
| 4. | "He Was There" | 4:23 |
| 5. | "No More" | 1:06 |
| 6. | "The War Room" | 1:42 |
| 7. | "Footprints in the Sand" | 1:43 |
| 8. | "Who Are You" | 4:38 |
| 9. | "England 1562" | 1:03 |
| 10. | "Nice Horse" | 1:43 |
| 11. | "The Fez And The Portal" | 2:44 |
| 12. | "Two Doctors" | 1:02 |
| 13. | "Three Doctors" | 1:56 |
| 14. | "Somewhere To Hide" | 1:50 |
| 15. | "Rescue The Doctor" | 1:08 |
| 16. | "2.47 Billion" | 4:28 |
| 17. | "Zygon In The Painting" | 1:35 |
| 18. | "Man And Wife" | 1:33 |
| 19. | "We Don't Need To Land" | 2:27 |
| 20. | "We Are The Doctors" | 0:49 |
| 21. | "The Moment Has Come" | 3:06 |
| 22. | "This Time There's Three Of Us (The Majestic Tale)" | 7:03 |
| 23. | "Song for Four / Home" | 3:41 |
| Total length: | | 53:35 |

Disc 2 - "The Time of the Doctor"
| No. | Title | Length |
|---|---|---|
| 1. | "The Message" | 1:16 |
| 2. | "Handles" | 2:07 |
| 3. | "The Dance Of The Naked Doctor" | 2:13 |
| 4. | "You Saved It" | 0:57 |
| 5. | "Papal Mainframe" | 0:45 |
| 6. | "Tasha Lem" | 1:07 |
| 7. | "Bedroom Talk" | 1:49 |
| 8. | "The Mission" | 0:54 |
| 9. | "Christmas" | 2:27 |
| 10. | "The Crack" | 5:24 |
| 11. | "Rhapsody of War" | 0:52 |
| 12. | "Back to Christmas" | 3:09 |
| 13. | "Snow Over Trenzalore (Song for Four)" | 2:46 |
| 14. | "Beginning Of The End" | 2:47 |
| 15. | "This Is How It Ends" | 3:07 |
| 16. | "Never Tell Me The Rules" | 3:12 |
| 17. | "Trenzalore/The Long Song/I Am Information (Reprise)" | 4:03 |
| 18. | "Hello Twelve" | 0:40 |
| Total length: | | 39:35 |
