= The Banquo Legacy =

2000 novel by Andy Lane and Justin Richards

- Author: Andy Lane & Justin Richards
- Series: Doctor Who book: Eighth Doctor Adventures
- Release number: 35
- Subject: Featuring: Eighth Doctor; Fitz and Compassion
- Publisher: BBC Books
- Publication date: June 2000
- Pages: 288
- ISBN: 0-563-53808-2
- Preceded by: The Space Age
- Followed by: The Ancestor Cell

The Banquo Legacy is a BBC Books original novel written by Andy Lane and Justin Richards and based on the long-running British science fiction television series Doctor Who. It features the Eighth Doctor, Fitz and Compassion.

== Trivia ==
The novel began life as a non-Doctor Who story by Lane and Richards that was never published. Some while later, Richards then converted the story to fit the Eighth Doctor Adventures.
