= Eighth Doctor =

Incarnation of lead character in Doctor Who

The Doctor
The Eighth Doctor
- Doctor Who character
- Paul McGann as the Eighth Doctor
- First regular appearance: Doctor Who (1996)
- Last regular appearance: Doctor Who (1996)
- Introduced by: Philip Segal
- Portrayed by: Paul McGann
- Preceded by: Sylvester McCoy (Seventh Doctor)
- Succeeded by: Christopher Eccleston (Ninth Doctor)

Information
- Tenure: May 1996
- Appearances: 1 story (1 episode)
- Companions: Grace Holloway
- Chronology: TV film (1996); Specials (2013); Specials (2022)

The Eighth Doctor is an incarnation of the Doctor, the protagonist of the British science fiction television series Doctor Who. He is portrayed by Paul McGann.

The character was introduced in the 1996 TV film Doctor Who, a back-door pilot produced in an unsuccessful attempt to relaunch the series following its 1989 cancellation. While the Eighth Doctor initially had only one on-screen appearance, his adventures were portrayed extensively in subsequent spin-off media, including more than 70 audio dramas starring McGann. In 2013, the actor reprised the role in the mini-episode "The Night of the Doctor", which depicts the Eighth Doctor's final adventure and his regeneration into the War Doctor (played by John Hurt). McGann subsequently reprised the role in a brief cameo alongside other past incarnations in "The Power of the Doctor" (2022), his first filmed appearance for a televised episode of Doctor Who.

Within the series' narrative, the Doctor is a centuries-old alien Time Lord from the planet Gallifrey who travels in time and space in the TARDIS, frequently with companions. At the end of life, the Doctor regenerates; as a result, the physical appearance and personality of the Doctor changes. Preceded in regeneration by the Seventh Doctor (Sylvester McCoy), he is followed by the War Doctor (John Hurt) and the Ninth Doctor (Christopher Eccleston).

His only companion in the television film is Grace Holloway (Daphne Ashbrook), an American medical doctor whose surgery is partly responsible for triggering his regeneration. In the continued adventures of the character depicted in audio dramas, novels and comic books he travels alongside numerous other companions, including self-styled "Edwardian Adventuress" Charley, the alien Destrii and present-day humans Lucie and Sam.

== Overview ==
A deadly confrontation between the Doctor and the Master.

The Eighth Doctor made his first television appearance in the 1996 Doctor Who television film, the first time the Doctor had returned to television screens since the end of the original series in 1989. Intended as a backdoor pilot for a new television series on the Fox Network, the film drew 5.5% of the US audience, according to Nielsen Ratings. In the United Kingdom, it was received well, attracting over 9 million viewers and generally positive reviews. It was also generally well received in Australia.

Although the film failed to spark a new television series, the Eighth Doctor's adventures continued in various licensed spin-off media, notably BBC Books' Eighth Doctor Adventures novels, audio plays from Big Finish Productions, and the Doctor Who Magazine comic strip. These stories spanned the nine years between 1996 and the debut of the new television series in 2005. He is the longest-serving Doctor in the Doctor Who Magazine comic strip. In the wake of the positive reaction to the revived television series in 2005, several of the Eighth Doctor's Big Finish audio dramas were also broadcast on BBC7 radio in an edited form. The trailers for these broadcasts explained that these adventures took place before the destruction of Gallifrey, the Doctor's homeworld. The Doctor's homeworld was also detailed in the revived TV series. In 2007, BBC7 broadcast a new series of Eighth Doctor audio adventures, produced specifically for radio. Paul McGann has continued to portray the Eighth Doctor in various audio spinoffs.

The continuity of the spin-off media with respect to the television series and to each other is open to interpretation. (The "Beginner's Guide to Doctor Who" on the BBC's classic Doctor Who website suggests this may be due to the Time War.) It has been suggested that the Eighth Doctor's adventures in three different forms (novels, audio, and comics) take place in three separate continuities. The discontinuities were made explicit in the audio drama Zagreus. In response, it has become increasingly common to consider the three ranges separately. The final Eighth Doctor Adventures novel, The Gallifrey Chronicles, obliquely references this split in timelines, even suggesting that the split results in the three alternative forms of the Ninth Doctor (a reference to the fact three different versions of the incarnation have appeared in various media). Mary's Story, a 2009 audio story by Big Finish, contradicted these suggestions, as there the Doctor mentions his companions in order, with book companions before audio companions. In "The Night of the Doctor", the Doctor "salutes" five of his companions by name, all from the Big Finish audio productions.

The Eighth Doctor appears as a sketch in "Human Nature".

Despite the fact the Eighth Doctor appeared on television only three times, he is the most prolific of all the Doctors (to date) in terms of number of individual stories published in novel, novella, short story and audio form. In 2007, the Eighth Doctor finally made a second appearance (of sorts) within the television series' continuity. In the episode "Human Nature" he appears on-screen as a sketch (alongside other incarnations) in the book A Journal of Impossible Things by John Smith. In 2008 and 2010 he appeared again as a brief image in "The Next Doctor" and "The Eleventh Hour" along with every other incarnation up to that time. In 2010's "The Lodger", he is shown in a flashback with his first, second, third, fourth, ninth and tenth incarnations. In 2013's "Nightmare in Silver", he is shown in a flashback along with the Doctor's other incarnations; he is also fleetingly seen running past companion Clara Oswald in the following episode, "The Name of the Doctor", though his face is not shown. His likeness is shown in "The Timeless Children" (2020) when the Thirteenth Doctor breaks out of Gallifrey's matrix.

In 2013, McGann reprised the role for the mini-episode "The Night of the Doctor", a prelude to the show's 50th anniversary special. This appearance marked the Eighth Doctor's final adventure and his regeneration. "The Night of the Doctor" proved popular with fans of the series, some of whom petitioned the BBC to make a spin-off series starring the Eighth Doctor.

== Personality ==
The BBC's official website describes the Eighth Doctor as an "effortlessly charming, romantic figure." It mentions that he is open about his own background and candid about the future of those he meets, highlighting the irony of an "open Doctor" who remains a closed book.

The Big Finish Productions website describes the Eighth Doctor as "an enthusiastic figure who explores the universe for the sheer love of it", always surviving on the strength of his excellent improvisational skills rather than preparing elaborate plans. The site states that he is "passionate, direct, sympathetic and emotionally accessible", but notes that these traits are "balanced by occasional feelings of self-doubt and weariness of his endless battles against evil."

Discussing "The Night of the Doctor", McGann said, "his instinctive take on the Eighth Doctor was exactly how I'd imagined this character to be, even way back, back in the 90s. You know, this... like a bruised nobility. I know it sounds wanky now, but... he's decent, but he's compromised. He's not a warrior, really, at all. There's a pacifist side to him, but he's a realist as well."

== Television appearances ==
=== TV movie (1996) ===
The Eighth Doctor debuts in the TV film Doctor Who. While transporting the remains of his longtime nemesis the Master to Gallifrey, the Seventh Doctor (Sylvester McCoy) is caught in the crossfire of a gang shoot-out in 1999 San Francisco's Chinatown, USA. He is taken to a hospital where surgeons, confused by his double heartbeat, attempt to correct a non-existent fibrillation. These efforts instead "kill" the Doctor, and he is taken to a morgue where after several hours—due to the effect of anaesthetic on his alien biology—he finally regenerates into his eighth incarnation. The Master manages to cheat death, and while the Doctor is on Earth his spirit takes over the body of a paramedic named Bruce (Eric Roberts). The Master then attempts to steal the Doctor's remaining lives by opening the Eye of Harmony inside the Doctor's time machine, the TARDIS, nearly destroying the Earth in the process. However, the Doctor and his companion Dr Grace Holloway (Daphne Ashbrook) are able to prevent the Earth's destruction, and the Master is sucked into the Eye.

The TV film did not lead to the commissioning of a revived television series, and while Eighth Doctor stories continued in other media, Doctor Who did not air again on television until 2005. After this, footage and stills from the TV film would be used in the later episodes "The Next Doctor" (2008), "The Eleventh Hour", "The Lodger" (both 2010), "Nightmare in Silver" (2013) and "The Timeless Children" (2020). Edited archive footage in "The Name of the Doctor" very briefly shows the Eighth Doctor sharing an adventure with the Second Doctor (Patrick Troughton).

=== The Night of the Doctor (2013) ===
McGann reprised the role for a webcast mini-episode, "The Night of the Doctor", in 2013, which precedes the 50th anniversary special, "The Day of the Doctor". The episode begins during the raging Time War between Daleks and Time Lords when he is killed when attempting to save a young woman who rejects salvation at the hands of a Time Lord causing them both to die in a spaceship crash. He awakens in the company of the Sisterhood of Karn, who explain that he has died and been temporarily resurrected. They urge him to bring the war to an end, and give him a choice of elixirs to trigger his regeneration. Saluting his various companions from the Big Finish audio range, he drinks an elixir designed to produce a warrior, regenerating into the War Doctor (John Hurt) who declares himself to be the Doctor "no more." In "The Day of the Doctor," the Eighth Doctor joins all of the other incarnations of the Doctor in saving Gallifrey at the end of the Time War. He can briefly be seen on a screen in the War Room, though like the other past incarnations of the Doctor, this is achieved through archive footage.

=== The Power of the Doctor (2022) ===
McGann reprised his role as the Eighth Doctor in the final Thirteenth Doctor special "The Power of the Doctor", as one of the “Guardians of the Edge” in an afterlife, inside the Doctor’s mind. He, along with the First, Fifth, Sixth, and Seventh Doctors, help the Thirteenth undo her forced regeneration by the Master. Unlike the other incarnations, he appears in his regular costume rather than special robes, much to the Seventh Doctor's chagrin.

== Costumes ==
=== Original TV Movie costume ===
The Eighth Doctor initially wore a Wild Bill Hickok costume made up of a double-breasted frock coat made from forest green velvet with peaked lapels, a double-breasted waistcoat of silver grey paisley with a shawl collar and a gold fob watch, a white shirt, a battleship grey cravat, and moss green trousers intended for a New Year's fancy dress party, which he liberated from the lockers at the San Francisco hospital where he regenerated. He completed it with a pair of black ankle boots taken from Grace Holloway's ex-boyfriend Brian to give him the appearance somewhere between a Victorian dandy and Wild West gambler.

=== Costume during the Time War ===
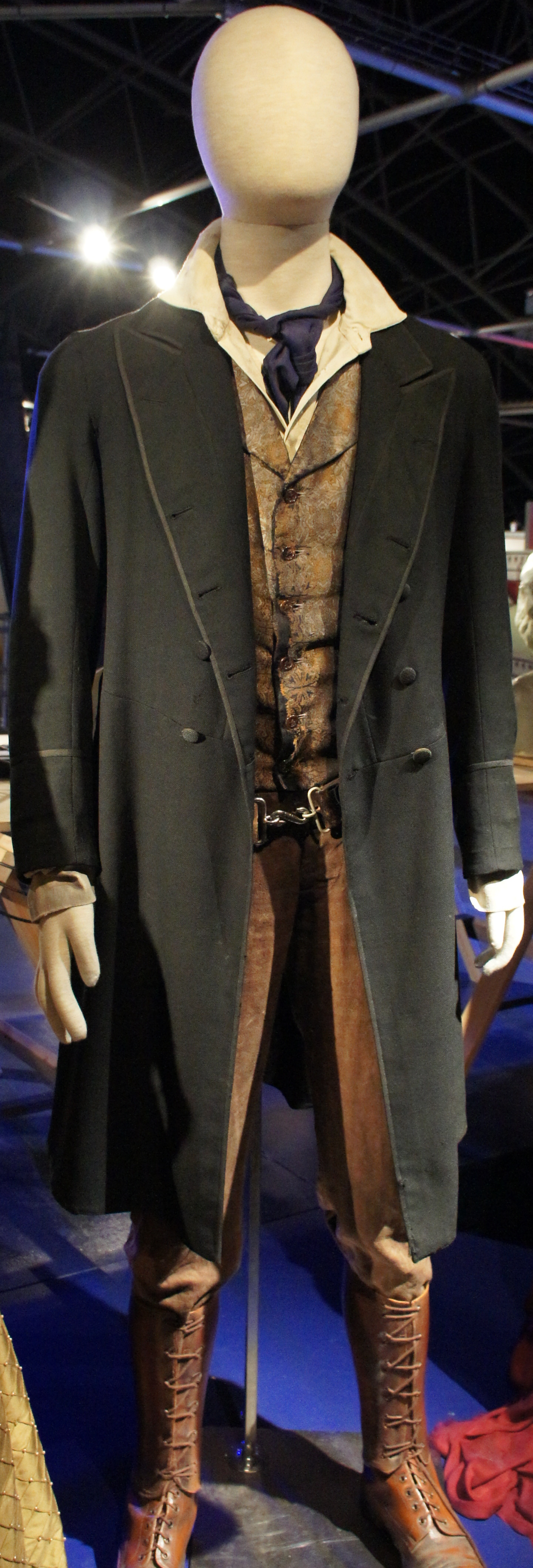
The Eighth Doctor's costume during the Time War

By the time of "The Night of the Doctor" he sported a double-breasted overcoat of bottle green moleskin with peaked lapels, a single-breasted waistcoat of bronze brown brocade with a fob watch, a midnight-blue ascot tie under the collar of a white shirt, gingerbread brown leather gaiters, and caramel brown US Army Cavalry boots; corresponding with his overall weary appearance, presumably as a result of many experiences during the Time War. This costume was intended to reference the character's original one, with the long green coat and grey waistcoat; after the positive reception of "The Night of the Doctor", it has been featured on many Big Finish Productions' audio plays set during the Time War and has also been used as promotional material. McGann wears a variation of this costume for his appearance in "The Power of the Doctor”.

=== Big Finish costume ===
In 2010, Paul McGann revealed a new costume and sonic screwdriver for the Eighth Doctor which he indicated would be the new costume going forward. The cover and promotional photographs for the 2012 Big Finish story, Dark Eyes is, however, the first story to officially feature the new costume. The new outfit was originally premiered in 2010 at the Armageddon Pop Culture Expo, along with a redesigned Sonic Screwdriver, courtesy of Weta Workshop. These changes were independently produced and were not affiliated with Big Finish Productions or the BBC, but were accepted as suitable for official use after the fact. The costume consists of a royal blue leather pea coat, an alabaster white T-shirt, navy blue jeans and brown shoes. In this outfit the Doctor also carries a brown messenger bag.

== Spin-off appearances ==
=== Novels ===
Almost as soon as he'd left San Francisco, the Doctor had another brief attack of amnesia, caused by a final trap of the Master's. To regain his memories, the Doctor was forced to visit all seven of his past selves and help them. Having regained his memories, the Doctor met a late twentieth-century Coal Hill School student named Samantha Jones; shortly after their encounter, the Doctor left her alone at a Greenpeace rally.

For a time, the Doctor adventured with an Ice Warrior named Ssard and a human woman named Stacy Townsend, who fell in love with each other; some while after they parted ways with the Doctor, the two invited him to serve as best man at their wedding (Placebo Effect). He also teamed up with his old companion Bernice Summerfield, along with Brigadier Lethbridge-Stewart and UNIT to combat an Ice Warrior occupation of Great Britain.

==== Faction Paradox ====
Eventually, three years after his departure and one hour after he left, the Doctor returned to the Greenpeace rally. During their travels, Sam and the Doctor became aware of a great war looming in the future of Gallifrey, between the Time Lords and an as-yet-unidentified Enemy. While exploring the issue of the war, the Doctor discovered that his Sam was not the original Samantha Jones; rather, her biodata had been manipulated by an outside agency with the intent to mould her into a prosaic distraction for him (Alien Bodies). Ultimately this plan proved a failure, as Sam developed into a much more strongly-willed companion than intended; at one point she spent three years avoiding the Doctor, so as to cope with a crush she had developed on him, but managed to survive and make a good life for herself in the future until she rejoined the Doctor as she could make more of a difference with him.

The close dynamic between the pair was shifted with the introduction of Fitz Kreiner, a sixties bar singer incorrectly suspected of matricide, and a sort of younger brother to the Doctor. Eventually Fitz found himself abducted by Faction Paradox, a "time-travelling voodoo cult", and brainwashed into their legions. When the Doctor realised that a Faction member, he had encountered was a biomass copy of Fitz- a 'clone' created and shaped based on others' memories and perceptions of Fitz-, he used the TARDIS's telepathic circuits to restore Fitz's memories and identity to the clone, believing that the original Fitz was dead and reasoning that the clone would essentially be the real Fitz in every way that mattered.

With both Sam and Fitz gone – Sam's origins established as a temporal paradox caused by exposure to a scar in reality created when the Doctor regenerated, which the 'original' Sam was only exposed to because the Doctor met blonde Sam – the Doctor continued his travels with the clone Fitz (although he was treated as the real one and generally thought of himself as such) and Compassion, an ex-Faction agent implanted with an interface that the Doctor found compatible with his TARDIS. Unbeknownst to the Doctor, the Faction – with the aid of the original Fitz – had changed his history, drawing the Third Doctor to a planet he should never have visited and causing a chain of events that culminated in the Third Doctor regenerating ahead of schedule, allowing them to infect him with the Faction Paradox biodata virus. While his immune system would allow him to resist the virus for a time, it would gain a greater hold on him with each subsequent regeneration, until it would finally transform him into a faction member in his eighth incarnation (Interference: Book One and Two).

Eventually, Compassion's implant, linked to the Doctor's TARDIS to prevent her being influenced by random local signals, triggered her unexpected mutation into a sentient Type 102 TARDIS, specifically the "mother" of the TARDISes that would be used in the pending War. With this knowledge, the Time Lords – led by Romana, now in her third incarnation – attempted to capture Compassion, intending to use her as breeding stock in preparation for the war. In response, and in light of the apparent destruction of his old TARDIS in a dimensional rift, the Doctor and Fitz retreated into Compassion and fled, the Doctor refusing to let his people enslave his friend in such a manner and resolving to keep on the run until he could find another way to deal with the issue of the War (The Shadows of Avalon).

The Doctor and Fitz travelled in Compassion for some time, until the machinations of Faction Paradox came to a head back on Gallifrey. As it turned out, in the new timeline triggered by the Doctor's infection, the Doctor was destined to become "Grandfather Paradox", the mythical founder of Faction Paradox. The only factor keeping the original sequence of events in play was the Doctor's TARDIS, which had rebuilt itself after its apparent destruction on Avalon, and had now materialised in a twisted form above Gallifrey, holding within itself the Doctor's original reality where he had regenerated on Metebelis III and never been infected ever since it sensed that something was wrong when the Third Doctor regenerated ahead of schedule.

In a final confrontation with his future self, the Doctor resolved the timeline conflict by channelling the TARDIS's built-up energies through its weapon systems, thereby destroying both the Faction Paradox fleet and Gallifrey itself. In so doing, the TARDIS was able to rewrite the altered timeline with the original one that it "remembered"; no longer able to contain both timelines as a result of its energy drain, one reality had to become 'real'. As a side effect, however, the Doctor's entire memory was erased, apparently from the trauma of the event (The Ancestor Cell).

==== Amnesia on Earth ====
To give the Doctor time to recover and the TARDIS time to regenerate from the extensive damage it had suffered, Compassion dropped the Doctor off on Earth in the year 1889; she then delivered Fitz to 2001, with the intent that he waits for the Doctor to catch up to him. With that, Compassion departed for parts unknown. Back in 1889, meanwhile, the Doctor awoke in a railway carriage to discover no memory as to his real identity, and no possessions save a small, shapeless box– what was left of the TARDIS after its power loss— and a note, simply stating "Meet me in St. Louis', 8 February 2001. Fitz".

Despite his amnesia, the Doctor retained a wide general knowledge. However, he also showed an uncharacteristic callous streak, easily allowing others to die if he felt that they 'deserved' to perish (The Burning). To contrast, he was capable of feeling unusually poignant warmth, even dating a woman in the 1980s, and adopting a young girl named Miranda, a Time Lady from the future (Father Time). During this time, he often became involved in strange problems outside the norm, such as confronting an entity that was essentially sentient fire (The Burning). He experienced a particular funk in the 1950s, feeling that his efforts to learn about his past were pointless, but his interest in life was re-inspired when he was recruited to defeat his old enemies the Players as they sought to escalate the Cold War (Endgame).

Unsure what "St Louis" was intended by the note, the Doctor created his own in London: the St Louis Bar and Restaurant. As 2001 rolled around, Fitz indeed turned up there to meet him. With the aid of new companion Anji Kapoor, the Doctor and Fitz completed the TARDIS's regeneration, dealt with a race of invading aliens, then set back again to exploring time and space (Escape Velocity).

With his freedom restored, the Doctor chose to counteract his extended exile by seeking as much non-human company as possible. During this period, the Doctor encountered all manner of unusual beings – from a species that at cursory glance resembled the Earth tiger (The Year of Intelligent Tigers), to water spirits, to talking apes from another dimension. Though at times the Doctor seemed somewhat cold – as when he seemed more concerned about damaged plums than a dead man (Eater of Wasps) – he retained his passion for life in all forms. Although his amnesia remained a bother, the Doctor acknowledged that whatever had happened to him had happened for a reason, and he might as well make use of the advantages it offered.

==== Sabbath and parallel times ====
Only a few months after resuming his old lifestyle, the Doctor faced another radical change: the loss of his second heart. As it happened, the heart served as a bond with Gallifrey; with the planet gone, the heart had begun to fester within the Doctor's body, pumping it with poison.

A man named Sabbath, an eighteenth-century secret agent gifted with time travel abilities, excised the blackened organ, both saving the Doctor's life and robbing the Doctor of some of his higher Time Lord abilities, including his respiratory bypass system and his ability to metabolise toxins. It transpired that Sabbath was actually after the heart for his own purposes: when implanted into Sabbath's own chest, it imparted upon him those same Time Lord powers, including allowing Sabbath to travel further from Earth in his own time machine than he had previously been capable of. An unexpected side effect of this experiment was that so long as the Doctor's heart remained within Sabbath's chest, the Doctor himself remained practically invulnerable to harm, returning to life after up to a day in a death-like state even after sustaining normally regeneration-inducing injuries such as getting his chest crushed by sandbags (though any injury sustained by the Doctor would weaken Sabbath).

Eventually, after a woman Sabbath loved sacrificed herself to save the Doctor from a malfunctioning time machine, Sabbath tore out the Doctor's second heart, allowing the Doctor to begin growing a new one.

Shortly after the restoration of his heart, the Doctor found himself locked in a desperate struggle with Sabbath as, along with his mysterious business associates, Sabbath hatched a plan to destroy all alternate realities. Sabbath believed that time travellers like the Doctor, every time they landed somewhere, created an alternate reality where they didn't show up, and that the universe was unable to support so many alternates without suffering damage; therefore, he attempted to trigger an explosion at Event One – the Big Bang – that would erase all alternate universes and leaving only one possible timeline. However, Sabbath's allies had been lying to him; in reality, Time would only split if absolutely necessary, and even then, it was nearly impossible to travel between alternate realities. In reality, Sabbath had been manipulated into creating a plan that would effectively wipe out free will itself, with the Doctor proving that Sabbath's perception was wrong when they found themselves in a situation that could only have occurred due to time travel in a single timeline.

The explosion at Event One was averted when the Doctor diverted the black light that would have triggered the explosion to 1898, but instead of reality collapsing into a single controllable timeline, what occurred was reality starting to 'slide' between histories, multiple parallel realities fighting to become the dominant one. Along with new companion Trix, the Doctor, Fitz and Anji travelled through the realities, including a world where the computer was never invented, a world where Earth was devastated by a strange even as all life aged forty years in 1843, and a world where humanity had time-travelling tours, with the Doctor being forced to erase at least two of these realities as he sought to restore the original timeline. During this adventure, the Doctor appeared to become a bit colder and calculating, sacrificing an innocent man to escape a pocket universe and even leaving alternate versions of Fitz and Anji to die to preserve continuity. However, in the end, their sacrifices paid off, the Doctor managing to stabilise reality by resolving a paradox that had been hanging over them since the beginning of the crisis, and then, with Sabbath's help, they confronted his masters; the Council of Eight, mysterious beings who gained power by foreseeing likely future events and then ensuring that they came to pass. The Doctor, as a rogue element existing outside of Time, was the only unpredictable factor in their universe, and was thus the only person who could stop them. Ironically, it was Sabbath himself who gave the Doctor the edge needed to stop the council; realising that one of the Council members expected Sabbath to shoot the Council member with a weapon designed to send the subject into the Time Vortex, Sabbath instead shot himself, condemning himself to eternal agony in the Time Vortex, but completely undoing the council's plan and destroying their space station, simultaneously restoring the possibility of parallel worlds to the universe.

==== The Gallifrey Chronicles ====
Some while after this, the Doctor was captured by Marnal, one of the few surviving Gallifreyans, and accused of destroying Gallifrey. Although Gallifrey had been all but wiped from history by the Doctor's actions, Marnal was able to jury-rig a Time Space Visualiser to witness the Doctor actually push the button as he faced off against the Grandfather, although there were about three minutes between the Doctor firing the shot and Gallifrey's actual destruction where the Doctor's activities in the TARDIS were unaccounted for. Reflecting on his discoveries in the TARDIS, the Doctor, along with the aid of K9 (who had been transported into a hidden area of the TARDIS and trapped there following Gallifrey's destruction) realised that his memory loss hadn't been caused by the trauma of destroying Gallifrey; in fact, the Doctor had wiped his memories to give his mind space to store the contents of the Matrix within his brain, compressed down so he wouldn't be driven mad by the voices of all the dead Time Lords within him, his own memories presumably stored somewhere else in his mind, given his occasional flashes from his past. However, right then, the Doctor had more immediate worries; namely, saving Earth from a species of massive fly-like aliens called the Vore, who would soon have the power to devour the planet. As The Gallifrey Chronicles ended, the Doctor, Fitz, and Trix dove into the Vore mountain, the Doctor equipped with a plan to stop the Vore and save the world.

=== Audio dramas ===
Paul McGann first returned to his role as the Eighth Doctor in Storm Warning, the first in a series of audio plays. During his time with Big Finish, McGann played the Doctor in a series of adventures and a few more stand-alone stories. McGann played an alternate version of the Eighth Doctor from a timeline in which the Seventh Doctor regenerates after being shot by Nazis in the 1950s (first mentioned in the audio drama Colditz), and appeared in Klein's Story. As "Schmidt", the Doctor teaches Elizabeth Klein how to pilot the TARDIS and puts her in a position to inadvertently help the Seventh Doctor prevent this timeline from occurring (unable to go back himself, since the TARDIS security protocols prevent him from going somewhere he already was).

Big Finish released a 50th-anniversary story in 2013, The Light at the End, in which the Master (Geoffrey Beevers) implements a plot to trap and destroy all eight incarnations of the Doctor by keeping him on Gallifrey. The Eighth Doctor and Charley meet with the Fourth Doctor (Tom Baker) and Leela (Louise Jameson), the Fifth Doctor (Peter Davison) and Nyssa (Sarah Sutton), the Sixth Doctor (Colin Baker) and Peri, and the Seventh Doctor (Sylvester McCoy) and Ace (Sophie Aldred). Working with the First Doctor (William Russell), the Second Doctor (Frazer Hines), and the Third Doctor (Tim Treloar)), they escape the Master's trap and prevent time from being rewritten so the Doctor would not leave Gallifrey. Companions Susan (Carole Ann Ford), Ian Chesterton (William Russell), Vicki (Maureen O'Brien), Steven Taylor (Peter Purves), Sara Kingdom (Jean Marsh), Polly (Anneke Wills), Jamie McCrimmon (Frazer Hines), Zoe Heriot (Wendy Padbury), Jo Grant (Katy Manning), Tegan Jovanka (Janet Fielding), and Turlough (Mark Strickson) also appeared in the audio drama. In the 2013 live-action mini-episode "The Night of the Doctor", the Eighth Doctor salutes companions Charley, C'rizz, Lucie, Tamsin and Molly before he regenerates into the War Doctor.

==== Mary Shelley ====
The Eighth Doctor's earliest audio-released adventures were a trilogy, released from October to December 2011, in which the Doctor travels with Mary Shelley (Julie Cox). Mary first appears as a friend of the Eighth Doctor in The Company of Friends, when she meets a future version of the Doctor and helps his past self save his life. The first story, The Silver Turk, features the early Cybermen (as seen in The Tenth Planet). The Witch from the Well tests the pair's relationship; the trilogy concludes with Army of Death, in which Mary decides to leave the Doctor.

==== Saving Charley ====
In the Eighth Doctor's first audio adventure, Storm Warning, the Doctor lands on Earth in October 1930 aboard the doomed R101 airship. On the airship the Doctor meets Charley Pollard (India Fisher), a young adventuress. He saves Charley's life, and brings her aboard the TARDIS as his latest companion. The Doctor soon learns that Charley's rescue negatively affects the timestream.

Charley dies on the R101 in another story, and the Doctor cannot return her to preserve the timeline. Her existence forms a rough story arc over two seasons of audio adventures as the Doctor discovers a series of minor historical anomalies caused by damage to the timeline, such as the CIA's existence in 1933 or Benjamin Franklin being president. The Doctor eventually learns that, due to Charley's survival, the universe has become infected with "anti-time" leading to a conflict with the wraith-like Never People: individuals who were erased from history for crimes against reality, and now seek to unleash anti-time on the universe. The Doctor sacrifices himself and the TARDIS by absorbing anti-time energy, which seals the rift and preserves Charley's life but transforms him into the bogeyman Zagreus. Later restored to sanity but still infected with anti-time due to the actions of Charley, his old companions Leela and Romana, and recreations of his three previous incarnations, the Doctor again sacrifices himself for Charley and the universe by removing himself from space and time. He enters a divergent universe of which he has no prior knowledge (or frame of reference), and in which there is no linear time (Zagreus). Charley stows away on the TARDIS, negating the Doctor's sacrifice by again placing herself in danger.

==== Divergent Universe ====
For two more seasons, the Doctor, Charley, and a new companion named C'rizz explore the divergent universe. They gradually unravel a plot designed around the Doctor by Rassilon, founder of the Time Lord society, who had been trapped in anti-time by the Doctor for his role in the creation of Zagreus. With the aid of his companions the Doctor escapes the trap, overcomes his emotional burden, learns that he has been purged of Zagreus, and returns to his normal universe with Charley and C'rizz (The Next Life).

After this, which coincided with the end of the Big Finish "seasons" in light of the 2005 return of Doctor Who to television, the trio wanders freely. The only continuing plot element involves C'rizz, who exhibits unusual (and potentially destructive) psychological development. This culminates in C'rizz's death (Absolution), which makes Charley want to leave the Doctor's company. Due to amnesia from a healing coma induced by a cyber-planner, the Eighth Doctor believes that Charley has left him in 2008 Singapore (The Girl Who Never Was); she is instead displaced in the year 500,002, from which she is rescued by the Sixth Doctor (The Condemned). Believing that the Eighth Doctor died before they parted, Charley travels with the Sixth Doctor. Their time together ends when the Viyrans, an alien race, replace his memories of Charley with Mila (another woman) to preserve the timeline.

==== Lucie Miller ====
The Eighth Doctor Adventures, featuring the Doctor and new companion Lucie Miller (Sheridan Smith), began on BBC7 on New Year's Eve 2006; a second series followed in 2007. A third season was streamed on the Big Finish website, and was available on CD. A fourth (and final) season began in 2009 with the Christmas episode Death in Blackpool, which dealt with Lucie's departure. The standalone episode An Earthly Child was also released in December 2009, in which the Doctor visits his granddaughter Susan Foreman on Earth (following the events of the First Doctor adventure The Dalek Invasion of Earth) and meets his great-grandson Alex Campbell. In Situation Vacant the Doctor gains a new companion, Tamsin Drew, chosen from four prospective companions. This season pits the Eighth Doctor against a new incarnation of the Meddling Monk (now travelling with Lucie Miller). During the season, Tamsin is seduced to the Meddling Monk's way of thinking; Lucie finds the Monk's violence distasteful, and re-joins the Doctor. When the Monk helps the Daleks invade Earth, Tamsin, Lucie, and Alex are killed in driving them off; at the last minute, however, the Monk betrays the Daleks to help save the Doctor and Susan.

==== Dark Eyes ====
In November 2012 Big Finish released Dark Eyes, a box set of four audio dramas whose stories take place after To the Death. The set introduced a new companion, Molly O'Sullivan (played by Ruth Bradley), an Irish Voluntary Aid Detachment nursing assistant in World War I. The Eighth Doctor changes his appearance, cutting his hair and changing into a World War I navy peacoat after his Victorian clothing is ruined. After the success of the first Dark Eyes box set, Big Finish released three more sets continuing Molly's story and introducing Liv Chenka (played by Nicola Walker), as a new companion; Liv had met the Seventh Doctor in the audio drama Robophobia.

==== Doom Coalition ====
The Eighth Doctor appeared in Doom Coalition, a four-CD, four-part miniseries. He, Liv and new companion Helen Sinclair (played by Hattie Morahan) hunt for the insane Time Lord known as the Eleven, all of whose past personalities are active in his mind at once. The Doctor interacts with River Song, the Eleventh Doctor's future wife (although she avoids interacting with the Eighth Doctor unless she is disguised), and confronts an alliance between the Monk and the Weeping Angels. Doom Coalition concludes with the Doctor thwarting the Doom Coalition, a group of Time Lords led by the Doctor's old schoolfriend Padrac. Padrac's latest consultations with the Matrix led him to the conclusion that the only way to save Gallifrey from prophecies of its destruction is to destroy the rest of the universe. The hunt for the Eleven is intended to manipulate the Doctor into gathering the equipment needed for Padrac's plan to succeed, but the Doctor and his companions disrupt Padrac's machines at the last minute. Big Finish began releasing two Eighth Doctor box sets in 2017: Ravenous and The Eighth Doctor: The Time War.

==== Ravenous ====
Ravenous is a series of four four-part box sets which are a sequel to Doom Coalition, initially exploring the Doctor and Liv's efforts to find Helen after she is trapped with the Eleven. It then narrates their efforts to oppose the Ravenous, an ancient race who are predators of the Time Lords; they evolved to feed on the energy released when Time Lords regenerate. The trio briefly ally with the Eleven against the Ravenous, but he betrays them when he learns that his condition makes him immune to the Ravenous' feeding habits (prompting him to assist the Ravenous in their campaign to turn the universe into their food. The series concludes with the Doctor working with three incarnations of the Master (the Master of the TV film, the War Master and Missy) to restore the Ravenous to their original state.

==== Stranded ====
Following the events of Ravenous, the next Eighth Doctor saga, Stranded, sees the Doctor, Liv and Helen crash land on Earth in 2020. The Ravenous' attack on the TARDIS has made it inoperable so the trio move into the Doctor's house on Baker Street, which has since been turned into flats and already occupied by several tenants, including Torchwood agent Tania Bell. The trio attempt to adapt to life in 2020 without alien invasion or other threats while the Doctor works on repairing the TARDIS. However, they soon become aware of Divine Intervention, a self-help organisation from the future whose machinations create a divergent timeline that culminates in the destruction of the human race. When the Doctor and his friends restore the timeline, they find themselves back on Earth in the midst of the COVID-19 pandemic while waiting for the TARDIS repairs to be complete. On New Year's Day 2021, the Doctor, Liv and Helen set off once again for further adventures.

==== Further Adventures with Liv and Helen ====
After Big Finish brought the monthly range to a close in March 2021, the decision was made to transition all Doctor Who ranges to regular boxset releases. Though The Eighth Doctor Adventures was already releasing as box sets, Big Finish decided to reformat the range further following the conclusion of Stranded, moving away from the four-part sagas and into standalone box sets, bringing it in line with the relaunched ranges of other Doctors. The first official releases under this relaunch were two box sets – What Lies Inside? and Connections – released in November and December 2022 respectively, and continue on from Stranded with Liv and Helen as the Eighth Doctor's companions.

==== The Time War ====
In 2015, along with the announcement that John Hurt would reprise his role as the War Doctor for a new audio series set during the Time War, Big Finish announced a one-off prequel release, starring McGann as the Eighth Doctor during the early days of the Time War. By the time The Eighth Doctor: The Time War was released in October 2017, it had been expanded into an ongoing series.

The series is set towards the end of the Eighth Doctor's life, some time after the ongoing The Eighth Doctor Adventures range. The Doctor is first seen travelling with a companion named Sheena but, due to shifting timelines caused by the war, she is replaced by a woman named Emma, who is likewise replaced by Louise (all voiced by Olivia Vinall) before being erased from time entirely with the Doctor having no memory of them. The Doctor meets a Quantum Astrotech student named Bliss (Rakhee Thakrar) who joins the TARDIS as the Doctor's companion.

The first four volumes depict the Doctor and Bliss attempting to protect innocent lives caught in the crossfire of the Time War, thwarting Dalek strategies and curtailing the worst impulses of the Time Lords. In volume three, the Daleks appear to have been destroyed with the Time Lords surviving the conflict, which the Doctor discovers to be the work of a benevolent manifestation of the Valeyard (Michael Jayston). The Doctor and Bliss follow the remaining Daleks into a parallel universe for volume four, where the Dalek Time Strategist is manipulating an alternate version of Davros (Terry Molloy) into recreating their forces.

Bliss does not appear in the fifth volume, with no explanation of her whereabouts, and the Doctor is travelling with an alternate version of his great-grandson, Alex Campbell (Sonny McGann), rescued from the parallel universe. The Doctor and Alex are instead joined by Cass Fermazzi (Emma Campbell-Jones), an engineer who the Eighth Doctor would one day meet and die trying to save in The Night of the Doctor. While the Doctor has no memory of Bliss, clues indicating her absence leads to the Doctor to conclude that her timeline was rewritten due to the Time War.

=== Comic strips ===
==== Unfinished business ====
In the Doctor Who Magazine comic strips, at an unstated time after his regeneration (and after an adventure in the 1930s involving Fey Truscott-Sade and psychic weasels), the Doctor revisited the town of Stockbridge. After being caught up in the games of the Celestial Toymaker, he picked up a new companion in lively sci-fi fan Izzy Sinclair. The two of them were soon caught up in the machinations of the Doctor's old enemies the Threshold, a mercenary organisation. The Threshold attempted to manipulate the Doctor into stopping the Daleks gaining access to the multiverse (which would kill an artificial solar system as a side effect) and dying in the attempt, but were outmaneuvered. Unknown to him, they implanted a device in Fey Truscott-Sade so that they could use her as an unwilling spy when she next encountered the Doctor. She did so in 1939, assisting him and Izzy against the vampiric Varney; the Doctor was left infected with a deadly bacillus, and he had to be taken to Gallifrey to be cured, luring him into a battle against a Time Lord cult called the Final Chapter.

Working out that the Threshold were using Fey as a spy, the Doctor and his old comrade Shayde faked a regeneration. The Threshold was conned into believing they were facing a vulnerable new Doctor (Shayde in disguise), allowing the real Doctor to infiltrate their base. While he and his friends were too late to stop the Threshold from destroying every single spacecraft in the universe, they were able to bring about the organisation's destruction before it could profit. Fey returned to her time, having also bonded with Shayde to save his life.

Unknowingly, the TARDIS had been taken over by the Master, who was manipulating events to gain the power of the omniversal Glory. The Doctor was specifically sent to times and places that would undermine him – discovering he had upset the course of Grace Holloway's life in 2001, encountering an alien race with motivations uncomfortably similar to his which caused death and horror in 17th Century Japan, and almost killing the benevolent Kroton by mistake. (A slight diversion between events saw the Doctor and Izzy team up with the actor Tom Baker and other 1970s television actors against Beep the Meep in 1979.)

In 17th Century Japan, the Doctor's attempt to save the life of samurai Katsura Sato, a friend of Izzy, left the man inadvertently immortal and thus robbed of both an honourable death and any sense of empathy. The Master later came for Sato, when he was mentally vulnerable, and gave him a fake religion to focus his mind on; Earth's history was altered as Sato, renamed Lord Morningstar, and his Church of the Glorious Dead conquered the planet, creating a technological advanced, highly brutal planet of jihadists. The Doctor, Izzy and Kroton wandered into their invasion of the museum planet Paradost; while the Doctor faced the Master over the Glory, Izzy and Kroton spent weeks on the occupied world. The Doctor was defeated, only for the Master discover he was not able to access the Glory, as instead Kroton and Sato had been the ones prophesied to battle for it. Kroton won the Glory, the Master was purged from the TARDIS and history was reverted, and the Doctor and Izzy took a well-earned break.

==== Destrii ====
During a battle against the body-stealing Ophidians and their gigantic snake-shaped techno-organic warship, the Doctor and Izzy encountered a brash and adventurous fish-woman called Destrii. While seemingly friendly and bonding with Izzy, Destrii was secretly on the run and she swapped bodies with Izzy to cover her escape; when Destrii was seemingly killed, Izzy seemed trapped within an alien body. The Doctor's next few journeys were spent trying to help her in this situation, both in coming to terms with the change and finding out what her new body's abilities were. Frida Kahlo helped Izzy mentally deal with the change, but the attempt at testing Izzy's abilities led her and the Doctor into a turbulent encounter with the humanised Daleks he had created in his second incarnation. Unable to prevent their tragic end – self-destructing to escape the machinations of the malevolent psychic Kata-Phobus -, the two of them were distracted and caught off-guard when Helioth and Hassana, two of the energy-beings called the Horde, abducted Izzy thinking she was Destrii.

The Doctor went on a relentless search to rescue his friend, with the help of Fey/Shayde and by forcing co-operation from Destrii, still alive in her stolen body. His quest led him to the planet Oblivion, a surreal and brutal world ruled by Destrii's mother, the Matriax. Izzy was rescued and returned to her original form, while Oblivion's court system and the menace of the Horde were both destroyed, leaving Destrii free to leave her world and explore the universe with her roguish uncle Jodafra. However, Izzy had decided she wanted to return home to her family, and the Doctor was left alone.

Feeling slightly morose, the Doctor was cheered up by an unknowing encounter with his old companion Frobisher and went on several 'holiday' adventures on his own. He eventually re-encountered Destrii and Jodafra in America during the 19th Century, where the upcoming clash between General Custer and Chief Sitting Bull was interrupted by Jodafra's machinations involving the monstrous wendigo. Jodafra had made a deal with the creature: power in exchange for being fed children. Unable to stomach this and with the Doctor urging her to listen to the spark of decency in her, Destrii helped the Doctor stop her uncle. In revenge, she was left beaten and abandoned, and the Doctor took her in as a probationary companion. Together, the two of them teamed up with MI6 and faced an invasion of early 21st Century Earth by time-travelling Cybermen; they were preparing to chemically overload the emotions of humans and thus make them willingly surrender to have their emotions removed by conversion. The Doctor destroyed them through use of the Time Vortex (similar to the later "The Parting of the Ways"), almost surrendering to it but giving up its power to save Destrii.

In 2007, Panini Books published Doctor Who: The Flood, the final collection of comic strips featuring the Eighth Doctor in Doctor Who Magazine. The book includes the essay "Flood Barriers" by strip editor Clayton Hickman in which he reveals that Russell T Davies had authorised the comic strip to depict the regeneration of the Eighth Doctor into the Ninth Doctor at the end of the 2004–2005 arc, The Flood. The cause of the regeneration would have been the Doctor's exposure to the Time Vortex in his efforts to destroy the Cybermen (the same cause that triggered the later Ninth to Tenth Doctor regeneration in Parting of the Ways). Destrii would have witnessed the regeneration and would have continued to travel with the Ninth Doctor in a proposed Year One arc. However, BBC Wales vetoed the Year One arc and indicated the Ninth Doctor could only be shown travelling with Rose Tyler, Hickman and writer Scott Gray eventually decided not to depict the regeneration as they would have been unable to give Destrii a proper departure. The Panini collection includes the original script for the regeneration sequence, as well as never before published art showing the regeneration itself.

==== Josie Day ====
In the Doctor Who: The Eighth Doctor comic series, the Eighth Doctor – from a point shortly before the Time War, as he is shown in the clothing and hairstyle he wore in "The Night of the Doctor" – is visiting an old holiday house of his where he encounters a young painter named Josie Day. Intrigued at her presence, he invites her to accompany him while he checks off items on a 'To Do' list left behind in his last visit to the house. In the course of the storyline, it is revealed that Josie is actually a sentient painting given life by a wealthy woman in the future as part of the woman's plan to grant herself immortality by transferring her mind into Josie, but Josie was rescued by the Twelfth Doctor and taken into the past so that she could travel with the Eighth, the Twelfth Doctor feeling that his past self was better suited to help Josie learn how to be human.

=== Stage ===
In July 2024, Big Finish announced that Paul McGann and India Fisher would appear on stage to perform a live recording of a new play – The Stuff of Legend, written by Robert Valentine – to mark 25 years of producing Doctor Who audio dramas. Four performances took place over Saturday 14th and Sunday 15th September 2024 at Cadogan Hall in London. McGann played the Eighth Doctor, appearing on stage in his Time War era costume, and India Fisher reprised her role as Charley Pollard. They were joined by Alex Macqueen as The Master, Nicholas Briggs voicing the Daleks, and Nisha Nayar and Carolyn Seymour sharing a dual role as young and old versions of Emily Barnfather respectively. On the day of the first performance, a version of the story recorded in studio was also released, with Annette Badland playing the older Emily Barnfather, and a "live" version combining recordings from all four performances was released in December 2024.

== See also ==
- History of Doctor Who – the 1990s
- Grandfather Paradox (Doctor Who)
