= The Night of the Doctor =

2013 Doctor Who mini-episode

- Doctor Who special minisode
- The Eighth Doctor regenerates—an event which happened off-screen prior to the series' 2005 revival, but not depicted until this mini-episode.

Cast
- Doctor: Paul McGann – Eighth Doctor
- Others: Emma Campbell-Jones – Cass; Clare Higgins – Ohila; John Hurt – War Doctor

Production
- Directed by: John Hayes
- Written by: Steven Moffat
- Produced by: Denise Paul
- Executive producer: Steven Moffat
- Music by: Murray Gold
- Series: 2013 specials
- Running time: 6 minutes 49 seconds
- First broadcast: 14 November 2013

"The Night of the Doctor" is a mini-episode of the BBC television series Doctor Who, released online on 14 November 2013 to promote the series's upcoming 50th anniversary special "The Day of the Doctor". Written by series head writer Steven Moffat, the episode is set during the Time War and features the Eighth Doctor's (Paul McGann) previously unseen regeneration into the War Doctor (John Hurt).

"The Night of the Doctor" originated from Moffat's desire to see the origin of the War Doctor, who would be introduced in the upcoming episode "The Day of the Doctor". It contains McGann's second on-screen appearance as the Doctor following his debut in Doctor Who: The Movie (1996); his involvement was intentionally not publicised to surprise viewers. It was shot in May 2013 shortly after principal photography on "The Day of the Doctor" was completed.

== Plot ==
External videos
- "The Night of the Doctor"

During the destructive Time War between the Daleks and Time Lords, the Eighth Doctor attempts to rescue a pilot, Cass, whose spacecraft is crashing into the planet Karn. When Cass realises that the Doctor is a Time Lord, she refuses his aid, ignoring his claims that he has never taken part in the war. The Doctor refuses to abandon Cass, and both are killed when the ship crashes.

The Doctor is temporarily revived by the Sisterhood of Karn; Cass, however, is beyond their help. Ohila, a member of the Sisterhood, offers the Doctor a selection of potions which, if consumed before he expires, will not only trigger his regeneration into a new form, but allow him to choose which characteristics his next incarnation will have. She implores the Doctor to take action to end the Time War before the crossfire destroys all reality. The Doctor initially refuses, but after his experience with Cass, he agrees that a doctor is not needed any more and asks for a potion that will make him "a warrior". Saluting the memory of his past companions, he drinks the potion and regenerates into a new incarnation, the War Doctor (John Hurt). Wearing Cass's bandolier, this new incarnation declares he is "Doctor no more".

== Production ==
=== Background ===
The long-running BBC science fiction television series Doctor Who began in 1963. The series' lead character, an alien Time Lord known as the Doctor, is able to undergo a process known as "regeneration" when fatally injured, completely changing his appearance and personality while maintaining his memories. This has allowed multiple actors to headline the series as the Doctor.

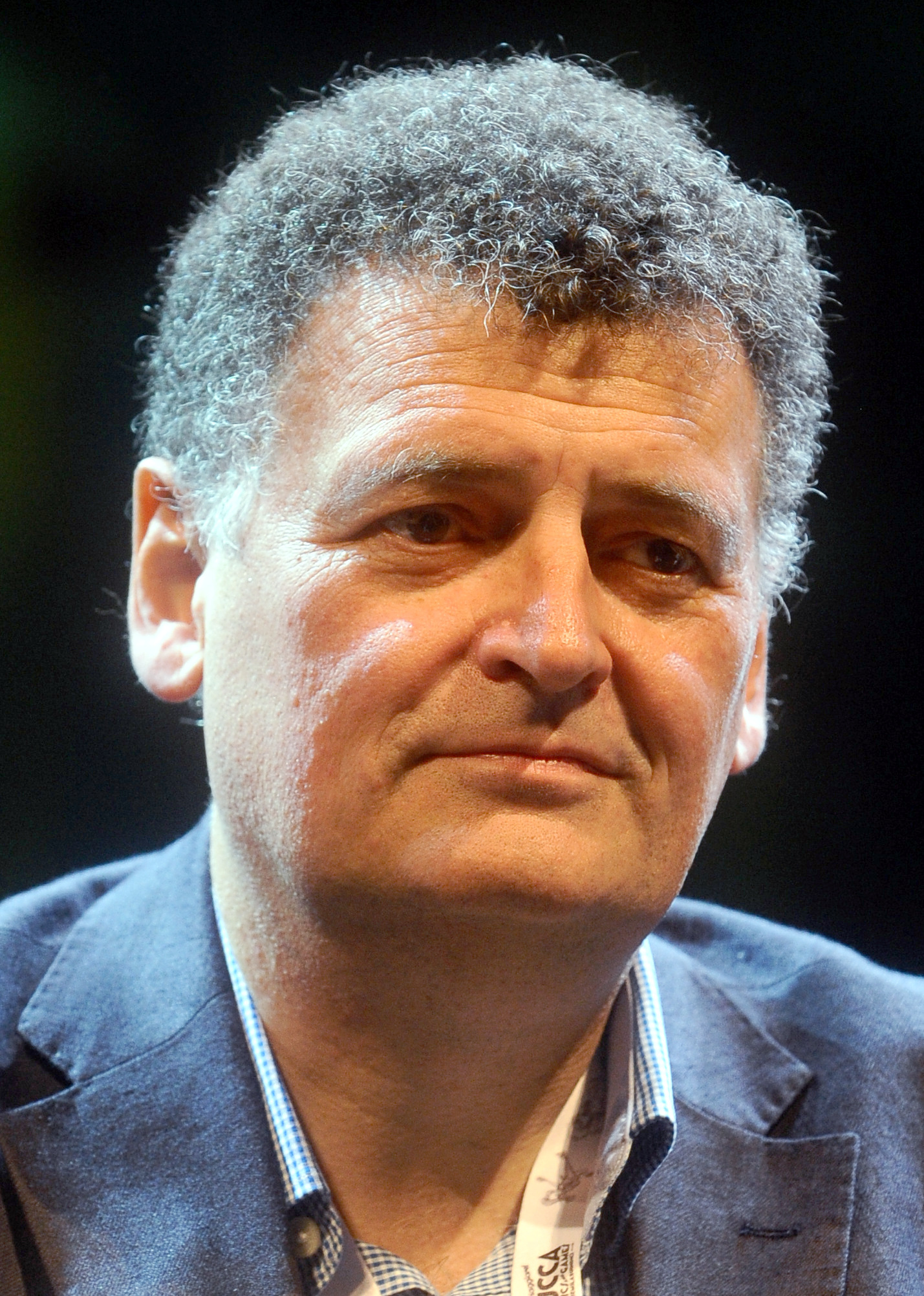
Steven Moffat wrote "The Night of the Doctor".

By 1989, when the series was placed on hiatus, seven actors had portrayed the Doctor. A television film was produced in 1996 starring Paul McGann as the new Eighth Doctor, which was intended to serve as a backdoor pilot for a revived series. The film was poorly received, especially by contemporary fans, and was not popular enough to warrant a new series. McGann subsequently reprised the role in various licensed Doctor Who audio dramas produced by Big Finish Productions. In 2005, Doctor Who returned with a revived series produced by Russell T Davies, who elected to cast a new actor in the lead role—Christopher Eccleston as the Ninth Doctor—rather than continue with McGann. Davies introduced the Time War, a destructive conflict between the Daleks and the Time Lords, which occurred off-screen after the events of the television film.

Showrunner and head writer Steven Moffat drafted the script for a commemorative 50th anniversary episode of Doctor Who, primarily involving the Doctor's three most recent incarnations, as played by Matt Smith, David Tennant and Eccleston. The plot centered on the Ninth Doctor's destruction of his home planet Gallifrey in the Time War, an off-screen event cryptically referenced in previous series. However, Eccleston declined to reprise his role of the Ninth Doctor following meetings with Moffat. Moffat toyed briefly with substituting the Ninth Doctor with the Eighth Doctor, but could not reconcile a warrior-like Doctor with McGann's characterisation of the character. Moffat pitched a solution to BBC higher-ups to excuse Eccleston's absence: "What if there was an incarnation of the Doctor none of us knew about? And, coincidentally, he was played by the most famous actor in the world?" John Hurt, Moffat's first choice, took the role of the War Doctor, an incarnation retroactively placed between the Eighth and Ninth Doctors.

=== Writing ===
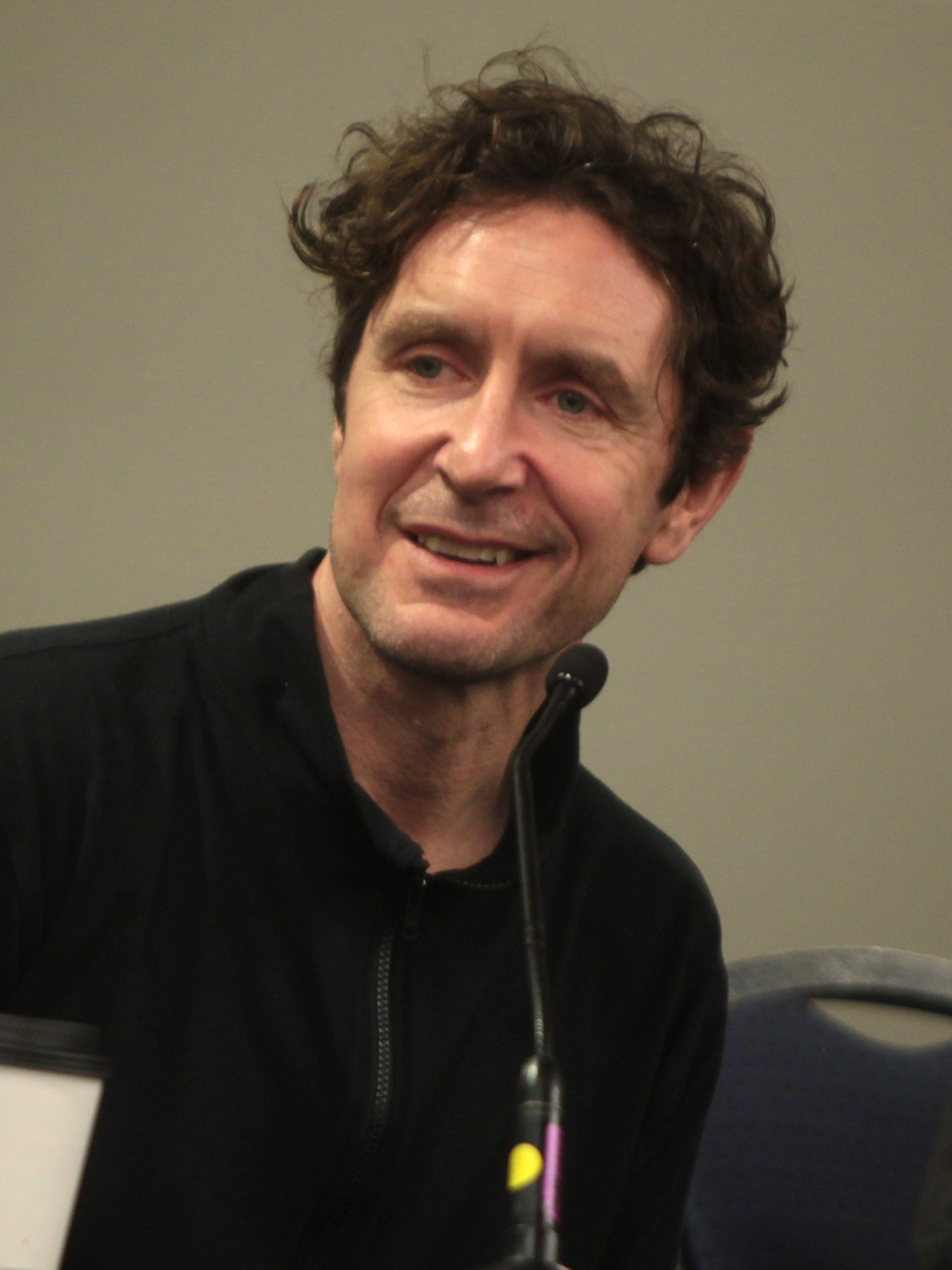
Paul McGann reprised the role of the Eighth Doctor on screen for the first time since his debut in Doctor Who (1996).

The idea for "The Night of the Doctor" came following the creation of the previously unknown incarnation of the Doctor played by John Hurt in "The Name of the Doctor" (2013). Moffat decided that he wanted to see how this Doctor came into being, with the best story idea being a direct regeneration from the Eighth Doctor, which would have the added benefit of showing the end of the Eighth Doctor, which Moffat had always wanted to see. Having contacted Paul McGann, who indicated his willingness to participate, Moffat constructed the mini-episode to serve as an additional surprise for the fans, as well as serving as an introductory piece to "The Day of the Doctor" (2013). It marked McGann's second on-screen appearance as the Doctor, after the 1996 television film.

Before regenerating, the Doctor mentions Charley Pollard, C'rizz, Lucie Miller, Tamsin Drew, and Molly O'Sullivan, his companions in audio dramas produced by Big Finish Productions. This marks the first time that original characters from the Big Finish audio series have been mentioned in the television show. Karn and the Sisterhood had also appeared in Eighth Doctor stories, but debuted in the television show in The Brain of Morbius, a 1976 Fourth Doctor story.

=== Filming ===
"The Night of the Doctor" was recorded at Roath Lock on 7–8 May 2013; the first day of filming consisted of all scenes taking place on the planet Karn, while the second day consisted of scenes in Cass' spaceship. Rather than a return to the costume from the TV movie or using the new image that Big Finish had introduced, Moffat decided on a variation of the TV movie outfit designed by Howard Burden. The new outfit referenced the previous one, retaining the long green coat and grey waistcoat, but making it appear more of an "adventurer's" rather than "gentleman's" outfit. At the same time, pictures of McGann in costume were taken on the Eleventh Doctor's TARDIS console room set.

An archival photograph of John Hurt as Rodion Raskolnikov in the 1979 BBC adaptation of Crime and Punishment was used to represent the reflection of the young War Doctor.

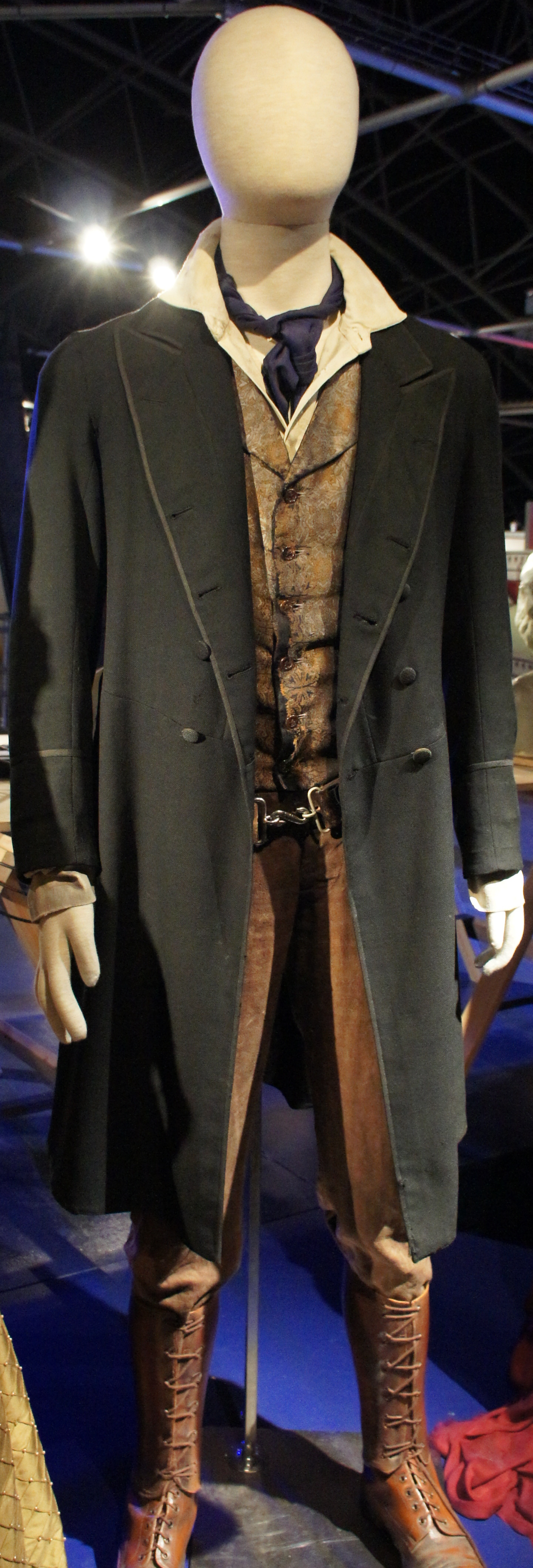
The Eighth Doctor's costume in this episode, on display at the Doctor Who Experience.

== Broadcast and reception ==
The broadcast of the episode came as a surprise to viewers, as it was announced via Twitter less than an hour before its release. The appearance of Paul McGann was similarly unexpected. The mini-episode was intended to be released during the actual week of the anniversary, but was brought forward as its existence, as well as the surprise presence of McGann as the Eighth Doctor, were about to be leaked. The Atlantic listed "The Night of the Doctor" as one of the best television episodes of 2013.

The episode was made available on the BBC's YouTube site, its iPlayer service, and on the BBC Red Button service. "The Night of the Doctor" received over 2.5 million views within the week of its release. McGann's reprise performance was met with acclaim; fans of the episode campaigned for the BBC to grant the Eighth Doctor his own spin-off series, with one petition on Change.org accumulating over 15,000 signatures.

BBC America aired the episode on 25 December 2013 as part of an expanded broadcast of "The Day of the Doctor" including deleted scenes excluded from the normal US broadcast honouring the 50th Anniversary as well as Matt Smith's final episode which aired immediately following it and his farewell special.

=== Fan reaction ===
After the release of the mini-episode, fans of Doctor Who demanded a Doctor Who spin-off featuring McGann, multi-Doctor stories between McGann and Peter Capaldi's Twelfth Doctor, or further specials or mini-episodes with McGann. A petition for a spin-off passed the goal of 15,000 signatures in November 2013, but extended the goal to 25,000 and has since then surpassed 20,000 signatures. Paul McGann indicated his willingness to return and noted that he had signed the petition himself. Emma Campbell-Jones, who played Cass, indicated a willingness to return also, noting that it isn't explicit that Cass died and that the character "needs to see that he is the good Doctor."

However, Moffat indicated that a McGann spin-off would not happen as, with the exception of the anniversary, there should be "one Doctor at a time." He also indicated that McGann's appearance was less important than the fact that his appearance was a surprise and stated that further mini-episodes with high production values would be produced and would be surprising for viewers and even the BBC.

McGann made his third on-screen appearance as the Doctor in the 2022 episode "The Power of the Doctor". In 2023, McGann and Campbell-Jones reprised their roles for Big Finish's audio series The Eighth Doctor Adventures: Time War.

In 2023, James Cooray Smith wrote a Black Archive book looking at The Night of the Doctor, making it the shortest length televised Doctor Who story to be accorded a book length study.

== Home media and novelisation ==
The episode was included as an extra on the Blu-ray and DVD release of "The Day of the Doctor" on 2 December 2013 in the UK. The special was also re-released on DVD and Blu-ray on 8 September 2014 as part of a "50th Anniversary Collectors Edition" boxset alongside "The Name of the Doctor", An Adventure in Space and Time, "The Day of the Doctor", "The Time of the Doctor" and The Five(ish) Doctors Reboot. The episode was also released again as an extra feature on the Blu Ray release of Doctor Who: The Movie on 19 September 2016.

The storyline from this episode was included in the novelisation of "The Day of the Doctor".
