= The Ancestor Cell =

2000 novel by Peter Anghelides and Stephen Cole

- Authors: Peter Anghelides; Stephen Cole
- Series: Doctor Who book: Eighth Doctor Adventures
- Release number: 36
- Subject: Featuring: Eighth Doctor; Fitz, Compassion, Romana III
- Publisher: BBC Books
- Publication date: July 2000
- ISBN: 0-563-53809-0
- Preceded by: The Banquo Legacy
- Followed by: The Burning

The Ancestor Cell is a novel by Peter Anghelides and Stephen Cole, based on the science fiction television series Doctor Who. It features the Eighth Doctor, Fitz Kreiner, Compassion, and Romana III, as well as a brief appearance of the Third Doctor in a ghost-like state due to the Faction's manipulation of the Doctor's timeline, and features the last appearance of Faction Paradox in the Eighth Doctor Adventures.

In 2000, The Ancestor Cell was placed ninth in the Top 10 of SFX's "Best SF/Fantasy novelisation or TV tie-in novel" category for that year.

== Plot ==
Following on from the events of The Banquo Legacy, the Time Lords have cracked the base code the Eighth Doctor programmed into Compassion's randomiser, and intercept her at her next destination. Threatened with enslavement, Compassion activates her built in weapons system and destroys the approaching WarTARDISes, while the Doctor fights for control of her navigation systems. The resulting "hiccup" expels Fitz and the Doctor into the vortex. The Doctor is captured while escaping from the Edifice, a massive bone structure that has appeared in the skies above Gallifrey, and taken to Gallifrey, where he is accused of being an agent of Faction Paradox. The Doctor is forced to aid the Time Lords in the capture of Compassion to aid in the forthcoming War.

Meanwhile, Fitz appears before a group of disenchanted, young Time Lords who are holding rituals based on the occult texts of Faction Paradox and finds himself unable to escape. Getting further embroiled in the group's activities, Fitz witnesses the creation of a copy of former President Greyjan the Sane and is then the unwitting donor of material used to pull the original Fitz Kreiner, now in the guise of Faction Agent Father Kreiner, from a Klein bottle universe into the modern day Gallifrey.

During her Reaffirmation Ceremony, Lady President Romana is challenged by Greyjan and placed under house arrest, with only Fitz as company. With the aid of Compassion, they are able to escape and witness Faction Paradox corrupting Time Lord history, followed by the Doctor's fall to the Faction.

Travelling to the Edifice with Father Kreiner and a Faction Agent known as Tarra, Kreiner reveals he is not truly working for the Faction and pleads with the Doctor to undo the past so he never becomes Father Kreiner, an act the Doctor cannot agree to. The Doctor reveals that not only has he not fallen to the Faction, but that the Edifice is, in fact, his old TARDIS, which was not actually destroyed at Avalon. Together he and Kreiner are able to dispose of Tarra before Grandfather Paradox appears on the Edifice to confront the Doctor.

The Doctor battles the Grandfather, and decides that the only way to prevent Faction Paradox from destroying Gallifrey's past is a drastic move: he chooses to use the energy that is holding the TARDIS together to destroy Faction Paradox and Grandfather Paradox, but also destroy Gallifrey in the process. With the whole of Time Lord history seemingly being erased from existence, Compassion is able to rescue the Doctor, Fitz and the remains of the Doctor's old TARDIS, placing them on Earth for safekeeping, until the TARDIS can regenerate itself over the course of the next century and the Doctor, now suffering from amnesia, can recover.

At the end of the novel, the Doctor is stranded on Earth for a hundred years; Fitz is left to his own devices in the late 20th century, with only a time and place to meet the Doctor once the TARDIS is once again active; and Compassion is released from her bonds to both the Time Lords and the Faction, free to roam time and space as she sees fit.

== Continuity ==
- The reason for the Eighth Doctor's amnesia is explained in The Gallifrey Chronicles.
- The images of the Doctor's previous incarnation created by dust motes on the Edifice are that of the Third Doctor, in reference to the original timeline, where the Third Doctor died after returning from Metebelis 3, instead of on Dust (Interference by Lawrence Miles).
- This story is where the Doctor Who books and Faction Paradox media continuities diverge. Although there are some attempts to reconcile the two (The Book of The War states that the enemy referred to in this book was not the Enemy, and the Faction that appeared was from a much later time when they were little more than a parody of themselves), it is generally accepted they no longer exist in the same continuity. As another indicator, in the Faction Paradox stories, the homeworld of the Great Houses still exists and the War still rages.
- Despite reports to the contrary, "The Enemy" were never originally planned to be the Daleks. Other books in the series make it clear that the enemy cannot be the Daleks. The confusion arose in relation to a later BBC Books arc, culminating in Sometime Never... (2004), which had been intended to feature the Daleks until legal issues prevented it. Craig Hinton's Past Doctor Adventures novel The Quantum Archangel, depicts a universe where the Daleks are the Enemy, but those events take place in an alternative reality.
