= War Doctor =

Incarnation of a fictional character from Doctor Who

The Doctor
The War Doctor
- Doctor Who character
- John Hurt as the War Doctor
- First appearance: "The Name of the Doctor" (2013)
- Last appearance: "The Day of the Doctor" (2013)
- Introduced by: Steven Moffat
- Portrayed by: John Hurt

Information
- Appearances: 1 story (1 episode)
- Chronology: Specials (2013)

The War Doctor (Note: In "The Name of the Doctor" and "The Day of the Doctor", he is billed simply as "The Doctor"; on official merchandising, he is referred to as the "Other Doctor"; however, in "The Night of the Doctor", he is referred to as the "War Doctor" on-screen, and this title is officially used by the BBC, Steven Moffat, and the licensed audio series.) is an incarnation of the Doctor in the British science fiction television programme Doctor Who. He was portrayed by the English actor John Hurt. Although he precedes Christopher Eccleston's Ninth Doctor in the show's fictional chronology, his first onscreen appearance came eight years after Eccleston's; the War Doctor was retroactively created by showrunner Steven Moffat for productions celebrating the show's 50th anniversary. Hurt reprised the role in the 2015 audio drama series The War Doctor until his death in 2017, with actor Jonathon Carley taking over the role from 2020 onward in the prequel series The War Doctor Begins.

Within the programme's narrative, the Doctor is an alien Time Lord from the planet Gallifrey, who is hundreds of years old and travels in time and space in his TARDIS. When the Doctor is critically injured, he can regenerate his body, but in doing so, gains a new physical appearance and with it, a distinct new personality. This plot device has allowed a number of actors to portray different incarnations of the Doctor over the show's long run. The War Doctor is introduced as the incarnation of the Doctor who fought in the Time War of the show's modern-day backstory. He was created as a result of a conscious decision of the Eighth Doctor, played by Paul McGann, to take up arms and become a warrior; in accepting this duty, the War Doctor disowned the title of "Doctor", and after the war's end is viewed with disdain by his subsequent incarnations, who reclaim the title that the character is known by. In the 50th anniversary special "The Day of the Doctor", however, the Eleventh Doctor revises his opinion of this incarnation after revisiting the final moments of the war.

== Development ==
In his original conception of the show's anniversary special, Moffat had written the Ninth Doctor as having ended the Time War. However, he was "pretty certain" that Christopher Eccleston would decline to return to the role. Eccleston declined to reprise his role of the Ninth Doctor following meetings with Moffat, as he believed the script didn't do justice to the character; additionally he was still hurt by the BBC's actions during his tenure. Moffat had reservations about making Paul McGann's Eighth Doctor the incarnation who had ended the war.

Moffat pitched a solution to BBC higher-ups to excuse Eccleston's absence: "What if there was an incarnation of the Doctor none of us knew about? And, coincidentally, he was played by the most famous actor in the world?" This never-before-seen incarnation allowed him "a freer hand" in writing the story, though he acknowledged that the success of doing this would be predicated on being able to cast an actor with a significant enough profile.

Why not a mayfly Doctor, who exists for one show only? I'd often thought about that. Would it be weird in the run of the series to have the 45th Doctor turn up and be played by Johnny Depp or someone? Would that be a cool thing to do?

— Moffat in 2013, discussing the creation and casting of the War Doctor

John Hurt, Moffat's first choice to portray this incarnation, accepted "with remarkable speed". His incarnation is retroactively placed between the Eighth and Ninth Doctors.

== Costume ==
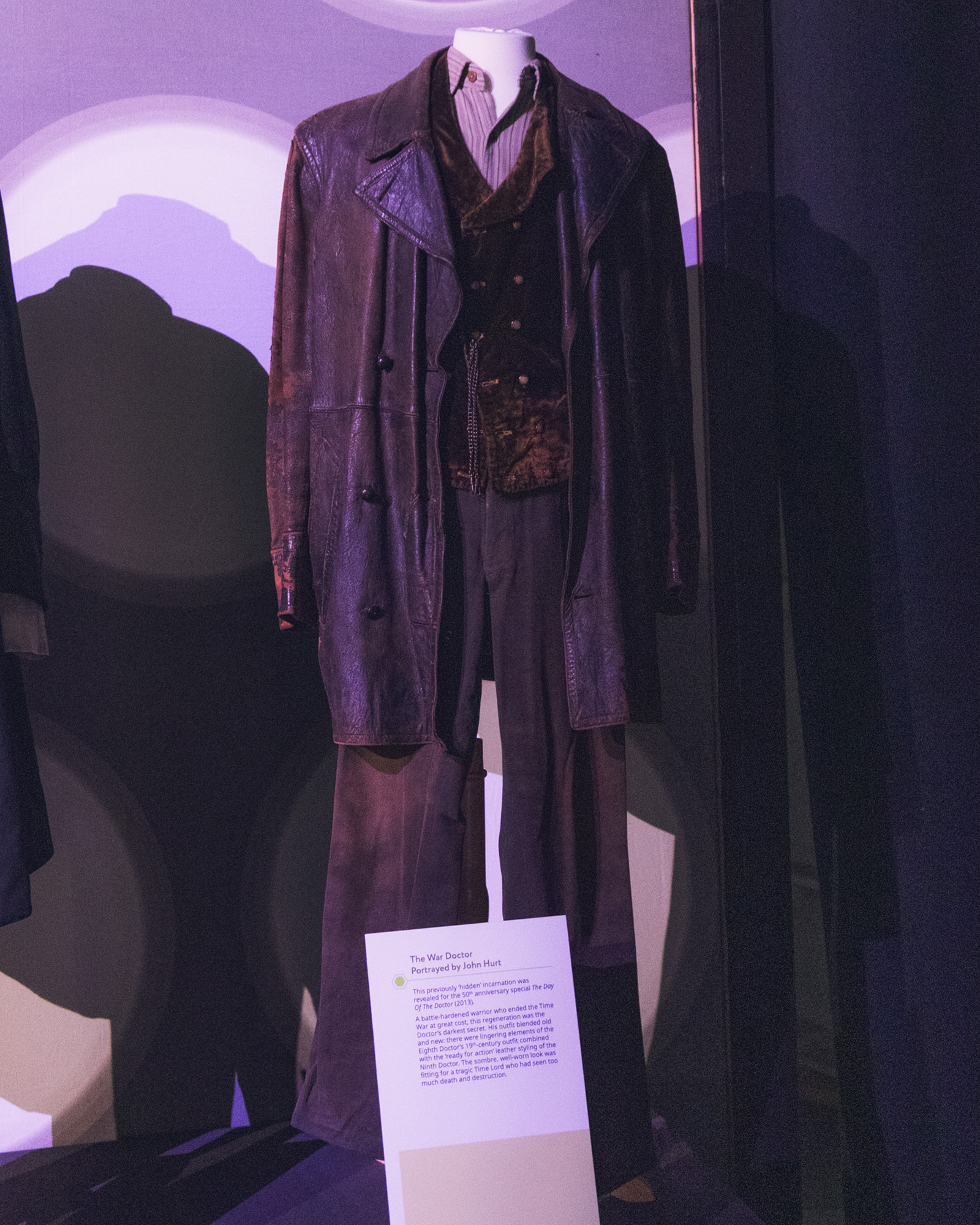
The War Doctor's costume

In "The Name of the Doctor", Hurt wore a burgundy and ivory herringbone scarf and a bone white pinstripe shirt. He also wore a double-breasted trenchcoat of chocolate brown leather with peaked lapels, similar to the Ninth Doctor's black leather peacoat as well as a double-breasted waistcoat of maroon moleskin with a bronze fob watch, dark tan trousers, army green leather gaiters, and ebony black combat boots similar to ones worn by the Eighth Doctor. Costume designer Howard Burden said that Hurt's character was a "dark Doctor" existing between the Doctor's eighth and ninth incarnations. Hurt requested to keep his beard in the role, which Moffat noted added to the feeling of the War Doctor's age and experience.

He was also seen to use a new sonic screwdriver with a scarlet light, closely matching the prop used by the Third and Fourth Doctors. He kept it in a bandolier originally worn by Cass, played by Emma Campbell-Jones, a young pilot and engineer who dies after refusing the Doctor's help due to him being a Time Lord.

== Appearances ==
The War Doctor first appears at the conclusion of the series seven finale "The Name of the Doctor" when the Eleventh Doctor (Matt Smith) and companion Clara Oswald (Jenna Coleman) are trapped in the Doctor's timeline. Clara believes she has seen all the Doctor's faces, but does not recognise one figure. The Doctor (Smith) tells her that he is yet another version of himself, albeit one who has lost the right to the name of the Doctor; when the figure declares that he did what he did "without choice [...] in the name of peace and sanity", the Doctor, before he and Clara return to the universe, states that the figure did not make his choice in the name of the Doctor.

The War Doctor's origins are given in the mini-episode "The Night of the Doctor", set during the Time War referred to in the series. After the Eighth Doctor (Paul McGann) is killed in a spaceship crash while trying to save an innocent woman, who rejected his efforts because she regards the Time Lords and the Daleks as equally monstrous for the collateral damage inflicted in the war, he is temporarily resurrected by the Sisterhood of Karn (last seen in The Brain of Morbius) and urged to take a stand and join the war. He is offered an elixir designed to trigger a life-saving regeneration into a form of his choice. Feeling the universe has no more need for a doctor, he requests to become a warrior. After regenerating into the War Doctor, he disowns the name of the Doctor, with his new incarnation's first words being "Doctor no more".

In the 50th anniversary special "The Day of the Doctor", having fought in the Time War for many years, the greatly aged War Doctor steals the superweapon known as "the Moment" with the intent of wiping out all combatants in the war along with his home world of Gallifrey. However, the Moment is sentient, possessing a conscience that requires the user to morally justify his use of it, and interacts with him in the shape of his future companion Rose Tyler (Billie Piper). Although acknowledging that she can do what the Doctor asks of her, she then sends the War Doctor into his future to meet the Tenth and Eleventh Doctors (David Tennant and Matt Smith respectively) to understand the sadness and regret they endured while continuing the good he failed to accomplish. Having witnessed his future selves prevent a Zygon conquest of Earth and the destruction of London, the War Doctor concludes that he must destroy Gallifrey, reflecting that he is lighting the fire so that better Doctors can be forged, only for the Tenth and Eleventh Doctors to travel back to activate the Moment with him, the later Doctors declaring that they now recognise the War Doctor as having been "the Doctor on the day it wasn't possible to get it right". However, aided by the Moment's interface which shows them a vision of the horror and destruction wrought in the Fall of Arcadia, the last battle in which the War Doctor fought, and Clara's plea to remember the vow they made in taking their name, the Doctors ultimately conclude that the loss of life that would be caused by using the Moment is something they cannot accept. They instead pool their resources, and with the help of the Doctor's various incarnations, attempt to save Gallifrey by freezing it in a moment in time, creating the illusion of the planet's own destruction. The Daleks are effectively tricked into firing on each other, annihilating themselves. The War Doctor accepts that upon returning to his own timeframe, he will forget his own heroic actions and must live with the false belief that he killed his own people. Before leaving, he takes a moment to thank his future selves for helping him "become the Doctor" again. Once inside his TARDIS, he begins to regenerate into the Ninth Doctor (Christopher Eccleston), realising that his body is "wearing a bit thin", echoing the First Doctor in The Tenth Planet (1966).

=== Archival footage ===
The War Doctor appears in archive footage in "Listen" (2014). The episode reveals that the barn to which the War Doctor travelled, in order to activate the Moment, was part of the Doctor's childhood home. Through similar footage he also appeared in "The Zygon Invasion", during which it is learned that the peace talks orchestrated by himself and his future incarnations resulted in 20 million Zygons taking up residence on Earth disguised as humans as part of an uneasy truce.

The War Doctor is not seen but is mentioned during "Hell Bent", upon the Twelfth Doctor's return to Gallifrey. A Time Lord soldier recalls that he served with the War Doctor during the battle of Skull Moon. He observes "the first thing you notice about the Doctor of War is that he's unarmed, for many it's also the last."

His likeness is seen in "Twice Upon a Time" when Testimony show the First Doctor the man he will become. Testimony uses the titles "Doctor of War" and "Butcher of Skull Moon" as some of the names he will be known by, both previously used to refer to the War Doctor during "Hell Bent". Later, after the Twelfth Doctor saves two soldiers on the battlefield, the First Doctor remarks "that's what it means to be a Doctor of War."

In "The Husbands of River Song", it is shown that River Song (Alex Kingston) has photos of all the Doctor's faces including the War Doctor.

The War Doctor appeared in a sequence along with all the other incarnations of the Doctor, when the Thirteenth Doctor broke out of the Matrix in "The Timeless Children". Similarly, his likeness would appear once more in "Rogue", shown alongside previous incarnations of the Doctor to prove his identity as a Time Lord to Rogue.

== Subsequent media ==
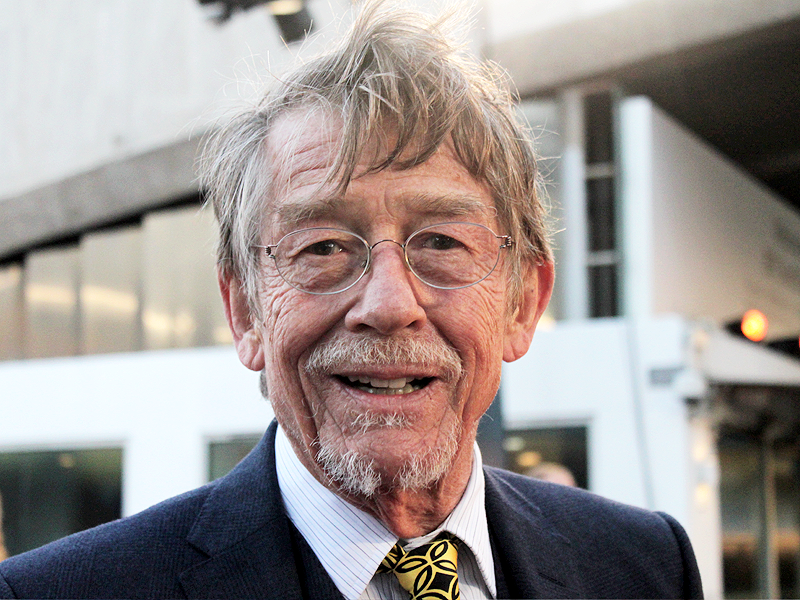
John Hurt portrayed the War Doctor.

The War Doctor appears in the BBC Books novel Engines of War by George Mann. The novel details the events leading to the Doctor's decision to detonate the Moment, as seen in "The Day of the Doctor", including his decision to act against the resurrected Rassilon and the death of a temporary companion as he acts to stop a Dalek plot to develop a weapon that could erase Gallifrey from history. The War Doctor appears alongside the other incarnations of the Doctor in the 2014 collection The Shakespeare Notebooks. The War Doctor's segment is titled "A Prologue", and purports to be a fictionalised account of the Time War written by William Shakespeare. A further prose story titled "The Stranger" was released in 2015 as part of the Heroes and Monsters Collection, while another George Mann story, "Decoy", appears in the 2019 collection Doctor Who The Target Storybook, in which the War Doctor stands up to Rassilon to save General Artarix and a Time Lord fleet from a suicide mission.

In May 2015, it was announced by Titan Books that the War Doctor would be the fourth incarnation joining the Tenth, Eleventh and Twelfth Doctors in their Four Doctors crossover mini-series. This is the War Doctor's second appearance in comics, the incarnation having previously featured in a non-speaking cameo in IDW's Dead Man's Hand. The War Doctor appears in the first issue, in a flashback. The War Doctor—along with his companion, the Squire—also appears in a number of flashbacks in the second year of Titan's Eleventh Doctor comic series, which involves the Doctor being put on trial for a crime he is believed to have committed in his earlier incarnation. The War Doctor essentially takes over as the lead incarnation in the stories The Organ Grinder and Kill God, with the Eleventh Doctor being largely absent from both stories, while his current companion Alice travels back to the Time War to help set up the events that the Eleventh Doctor is experiencing in the 'present', the crisis ending with Alice returning to her era and the War Doctor's memory of his time with her scrambled to preserve history.

The War Doctor, along with the other twelve incarnations, appears in the 2015 video game Lego Dimensions, voiced using clips of John Hurt's dialogue from his episodes. The War Doctor also appears as a playable character in the mobile game Doctor Who Legacy.

A younger War Doctor appears in a flashback sequence in a Twelfth Doctor comic, which sees the Twelfth Doctor reflect on the events that led to the apparent death of his old acquaintance Fey Truscott-Sade and his own darker view on the Time War.

=== Audio dramas ===
It was announced in October 2015 that John Hurt would reprise his role as the War Doctor for a series of audio plays by Big Finish Productions starting in December of that year. The War Doctor ran for twelve episodes over four box sets. The range concluded with Casualties of War in February 2017, a month after Hurt's death, and saw the Doctor reunite with Leela (Louise Jameson).

In 2020, Big Finish announced a prequel series—The War Doctor Begins—with actor and impressionist Jonathon Carley taking over the title role for stories set during the earlier stages of the War Doctor's existence. The first volume was released in June 2021 and the series came to an end with its sixth volume in December 2023. In March 2024, a sequel series was announced, The War Doctor Rises, with Carley returning as the War Doctor. Where the previous series was three separate adventures sometimes linked by a theme, Rises consists of three-part dramas, pitting the Doctor against threats including Morbius, the Cybermen and the Rani.

Carley also portrayed the War Doctor for the final episode of Once and Future—a series marking the sixtieth anniversary of Doctor Who. In the main plot, an unspecified incarnation of the Doctor is attacked with a weapon that causes them to switch randomly between past and future incarnations. The War Doctor is revealed midway through The Union, confirming that he was the incarnation on whom the weapon was originally used, with the other Doctors keeping him suppressed.
