= Doctor Who: Legacy =

2013 video game

- Developers: Seed Studio; Tiny Rebel Games
- Publisher: Tiny Rebel Games
- Producers: Susan Cummings; Jack Yee; Peter Hickman
- Designers: Lee Cummings; Kuenda Lee
- Programmers: Jack Yee and the Seed Studio Team
- Artist: Pest Jiang
- Writers: Lee Cummings; Ben Badgett
- Composers: Chris Huelsbeck; Fabian Del Priore
- Engine: Unity 3D
- Platforms: Android; iOS; Kindle; Facebook
- Release: Android, iOS; 27 November 2013; Kindle; 3 March 2014; Facebook; 10 July 2014
- Genre: Puzzle/Role-playing
- Mode: Single-player

Doctor Who: Legacy was a match-3 puzzle RPG video game released on 27 November 2013 and based upon the BBC television programme Doctor Who. The game was developed by Taiwanese company Seed Studio in collaboration with British company Tiny Rebel Games. It is a free-to-play game released to coincide with the 50th Anniversary of the popular sci-fi show, with rights licensed by BBC Worldwide. The game launched focusing on the Eleventh Doctor (played by Matt Smith), then later shifted the focus to the Twelfth Doctor (played by Peter Capaldi), following his debut in the show. New characters and content were added to the game regularly upon them being "signed off" with both the actors and the BBC brand team. The game includes every incarnation of the Doctor from the television series (including the War Doctor) and well over 200 companions from both classic and modern Doctor Who. The game closely followed series 8 and series 9 of the show with new levels launching each weekend alongside each episode and included new characters, costumes, and enemies from most of the episodes. The game received positive reviews from critics.

The game also contains content which does not come from the television series but rather from expanded universe canon from Big Finish Productions audio series, Titan Comics comic books, and George Mann's Engines of War novel. The game also has a side story entitled "Bigger on the Inside" which uses the retro 8-bit style art of PixelWho and follows the story of the TARDIS being infected by a virus. The game was closed down on 17 February 2019 as Tiny Rebel did not want to renew the license with BBC.

== Synopsis ==
The story begins when the Eleventh Doctor and Vastra arrive in Cardiff on 16 October 1978, discovering that the Earth has been invaded by the Sontarans, who have acquired time travel and are rewriting the planet's history. The Doctor must go back through his own personal timeline to defeat them before it's too late. Later story arcs focus heavily on the Zygons and The Master (in virtually all of his incarnations).

== Gameplay ==
The gameplay takes the form of a role-playing puzzle game covering the genres of: puzzle and RPG (similar to the core gameplay of other mobile RPG/match-3 games such as Puzzle & Dragons and Empire and Puzzles). As you play through the game, you collect characters which you level up and then use to build your team of 1 Doctor and up to 5 Companions by playing levels in a match-3-gems, detachable gem format. You are required to match different colour of gems to deal damage to enemies. Each character has a special ability which refreshes after a set number of turns (these abilities level up with the character), some examples of these are: colour changing, reset the board, deal damage, heal character and stun enemies. Whilst most colours deal damage, the pink gems are used to heal your team. By leveling up you earn points which can be assigned to different stats in order to improve them. Throughout the game you experience some of the Doctor's most famous tales, tied into an original story.

== Reception ==
Doctor Who: Legacy received positive reviews from critics. Scott Nichols for Digital Spy rated the game 4/5 stars saying that "fans are treated to engaging and fun puzzle battles featuring most of the characters from the series' more recent history". Android Central's Paul Acevedo stated that "The Doctor Who fan in me is consistently amazed by the game’s arsenal of characters and levels inspired by the show. No other game has managed to capture so much of the Doctor Who universe in a single package, with callbacks to both the classic and modern eras. Tiny Rebel knows and appreciates Who. That genuine reverence makes Legacy a must-play for fans of the show."

Chris Scullion, editor of CVG wrote "...For the past couple of months, an iOS game has become a daily part of my life. It's a free-to-play puzzle game that doesn't feel like the sort of game that Nintendo's Satoru Iwata recently referred to as a "free-to-start" title; one where players are forced to spend money to proceed." Mike Fahey at Kotaku wrote that "Like the popular Puzzle and Dragons, Doctor Who: Legacy is a game about collecting color-coded creatures and using them participate in match-puzzle battles. Unlike Puzzle and Dragons, Doctor Who: Legacy isn't all about paying for rare monsters. There are no ads in the game, just a simple, understated store, politely clearing its throat when you wander over and mentioning that, should you be interested, there are things for sale. It's one of the very best examples of free-to-play."

TouchArcade rated the game 3.5/5 stars, and wrote, "Really, we just needed to point out that this game is still kicking and going, and it's a pretty cool phenomenon. In a world where so many games are disposable and don't get updated when they break, there's the occasional Doctor Who Legacy which keeps adding content quietly on a regular basis."

== Sequel ==
On August 8, 2018, Tiny Rebel released Doctor Who Infinity, a follow-up to Doctor Who Legacy. The game uses comic book style images and voice actors from the show, combined with the gameplay of Legacy, with a few enhancements. The game also has bonus content, which can be purchased as add-ons and features new stories featuring characters from different seasons of the show. Unlike Legacy, Infinity received a PC port via Steam, on top of a mobile version.
