= The Burning (novel) =

2000 novel by Justin Richards

- Author: Justin Richards
- Series: Doctor Who book: Eighth Doctor Adventures
- Release number: 37
- Subject: Featuring: Eighth Doctor
- Publisher: BBC Books
- Publication date: August 2000
- Pages: 240
- ISBN: 0-563-53812-0
- Preceded by: The Ancestor Cell
- Followed by: Casualties of War

The Burning is a BBC Books original novel written by Justin Richards and based on the long-running British science fiction television series Doctor Who. It features the Eighth Doctor. It is the beginning of a run of books in which the amnesiac Doctor is stuck on Earth without a functioning TARDIS.

== Plot ==
In the late 19th century, the village of Middleton is on the verge of bankruptcy due to the tin mine running out, when a huge fissure opens in the moorlands. After a visitor called Roger Nepath offers to buy the mine and visits the fissure with the lord of the manor, Lord Urton's personality changes, and he allows Nepath to move into his manor house with his sister Patience.

The amnesiac Doctor arrives at the village and befriends Professor Dobbs from The Society of Psychical Research during his research into the fissure. Dobbs's assistant Gaddis claims to have empathic powers, which lead him to point along the fissure, where he is chased off by Urton. The Doctor notices that the water in a dam near the fissure has become warm and acidic, suggesting that it has been heated. Returning to the Fissure they find Gaddis's corpse horribly burnt, which fascinates the Doctor.

Nepath later holds an auction to fund his purchase, and demonstration a metal that returns to its original shape when destroyed, which Nepath gives the Doctor a sample of. The army gives Nepath a large amount of money for him to create self repairing guns for the army, which Nepath uses to buy more mining equipment. Later, the metal turns into molten lava, which causes the remains of TARDIS to grow to normal size, although it is still a featureless blue box. Dobbs and the Doctor break into the manor and discover that Nepath had been making many copies of his artifacts out of the metal, then selling them, as well as a young woman's body in a box, before narrowly escaping the Urtons.

Going into the mines, the Doctor finds that the tremors that caused the fissure opened up a new mine shaft, which is full of pools of molten lava, which is the source of the metal. The lava suddenly forms into creatures which burn Dobbs to death whilst the Doctor escapes. The Doctor explains to Reverend Stobbold that Nepath is helping living magma, with the power to reform itself, which has already replaced the Urtons and mine workers. After an explosion, the Doctor realises that Middleton is located in an ancient volcanic caldera - with a new eruption about to start. The Doctor meets the army on the way to pick up their new guns, where they are attacked by magma creatures and the new guns explode when fired, killing most of the soldiers.

At the manor Nepath explains that the creature has run out of resources in the mine, and he intends to release it into new areas, then take advantage of the resulting chaos. He reveals that the body in the case is his sister Patience's, who died as the result of a building collapsing after a fire, and Nepath believes that the creature can bring her back to life. Escaping the manor, the Doctor pushes Lord Urton into a river, where the cold water cools him into a statue, which crumbles apart. The Doctor returns to the manor and tells him that the woman is not really Patience. When Nepath questions her, she embraces him as the magma leaves her body, leaving him trapped in a statue's arms. The army place explosives near the dam, which the magma accidentally explodes, releasing water that turns the magma into stone. Nepath is freed from the statue, but the Doctor pushes him into the water, causing him to drown. The flood unearths new seams of tin ore, saving the town's economy. The Doctor leaves with the TARDIS's remains to wait for his meeting with Fitz in 2001.
