= The Name of the Doctor =

239 – "The Name of the Doctor"
- Doctor Who episode
- Promotional poster

Cast
- Doctor: Matt Smith – Eleventh Doctor
- Companion: Jenna-Louise Coleman – Clara Oswald
- Others: Alex Kingston – River Song; Richard E. Grant – The Great Intelligence; Neve McIntosh – Madame Vastra; Catrin Stewart – Jenny Flint; Dan Starkey – Strax; Eve de Leon Allen – Angie; Kassius Carey Johnson – Artie; Nasi Voustsas – Andro; David Avery – Fabian; Michael Jenn – Clarence; Rab Affleck – Archie; Samuel Irvine – Messenger Boy; Sophie Downham – Young Clara; Paul Kasey – Whisper Man; John Hurt – War Doctor

Production
- Directed by: Saul Metzstein
- Written by: Steven Moffat
- Produced by: Denise Paul; Marcus Wilson (series producer)
- Executive producers: Steven Moffat; Caroline Skinner
- Music by: Murray Gold
- Series: Series 7
- Running time: 45 minutes
- First broadcast: 18 May 2013

Chronology
← Preceded by "Nightmare in Silver"	Followed by → "The Day of the Doctor"

"The Name of the Doctor" is the thirteenth and final episode of the seventh series of the British science fiction television series Doctor Who. It was first broadcast on BBC One on 18 May 2013. It was written by Steven Moffat and directed by Saul Metzstein. The episode was watched by 7.45 million viewers in the UK and received generally positive reviews from critics.

In the episode, an entity called the Great Intelligence (Richard E. Grant) kidnaps Victorian-era Paternoster Gang detectives Madame Vastra (Neve McIntosh), Jenny Flint (Catrin Stewart), and their butler Strax (Dan Starkey), to force their friend, time-travelling alien the Doctor (Matt Smith), to go to the planet Trenzalore, the site of the Doctor's future grave. The Intelligence's plan is to trap the Doctor and then force the Doctor to open a door in time so the Intelligence can reverse all the Doctor's victories. It is the first appearance of John Hurt's War Doctor. The episode is part of a loose trilogy with the subsequent two special episodes, "The Day of the Doctor" (2013) and "The Time of the Doctor" (2013).

The episode features several references to previous episodes of the series. It was leaked in the United States when the Blu-ray release was distributed early due to a production error.

== Plot ==
In 1893, Madame Vastra and Jenny Flint are given information concerning the Doctor by Clarence DeMarco, in return for a stay on his execution. They use soporific drugs to hold a conference call through time and space between themselves, Strax, River Song, and Clara, in a dream. Vastra repeats DeMarco's words: "The Doctor has a secret he will take to the grave, and it is discovered." During their conference, eyeless humanoids called Whisper Men kidnap Vastra and Strax and kill Jenny. The Great Intelligence tells Clara to tell the Doctor that his friends are "lost" unless he goes to Trenzalore.

The Doctor and Clara travel to Trenzalore, the planet holding his future grave, to save his friends. The planet is covered with tombstones, the result of a great war, while a future version of the TARDIS (having deteriorated and grown to enormous size) stands above the graveyard. The duo are attacked by Whisper Men. An echo of River, still telepathically linked to Clara, helps direct the two to an escape route that leads to the giant TARDIS. Strax, Vastra, and Jenny (who is revived by Strax) are awakened by Whisper Men and meet the Great Intelligence.

The Great Intelligence threatens to kill the Doctor's allies unless the Doctor says his name to unlock the TARDIS doors. The Doctor refuses, but as he speaks, River says the Doctor's name and unlocks the TARDIS. Inside, the Doctor reveals a pulsating column of light to be his time stream. The Great Intelligence enters it in order to undo the Doctor's past as revenge for all the defeats it has been dealt. The positive effects of the Doctor's travels begin to be nullified by the Intelligence's interference. Jenny disappears and Strax forgets his history with Madame Vastra and attacks her. In self-defense she kills him.

Clara remembers the Doctor telling her that she has helped the Doctor in other places in time and space. She enters the time stream to restore the Doctor's timeline, bringing Jenny and Strax back in the process. Echoes of Clara fall through space and time and appear in adventures of the Doctor's previous incarnations. The Doctor enters the time stream to save Clara, guiding her from a place where she sees several previous incarnations of the Doctor. Reunited, the two spot another figure in the shadows which Clara does not recognise. The Doctor explains the elderly figure is another past incarnation of himself, but what he did in the past was not in the Doctor's name. The figure turns around, revealing himself to be the incarnation who fought during the great Time War.

== Production ==
=== Writing ===
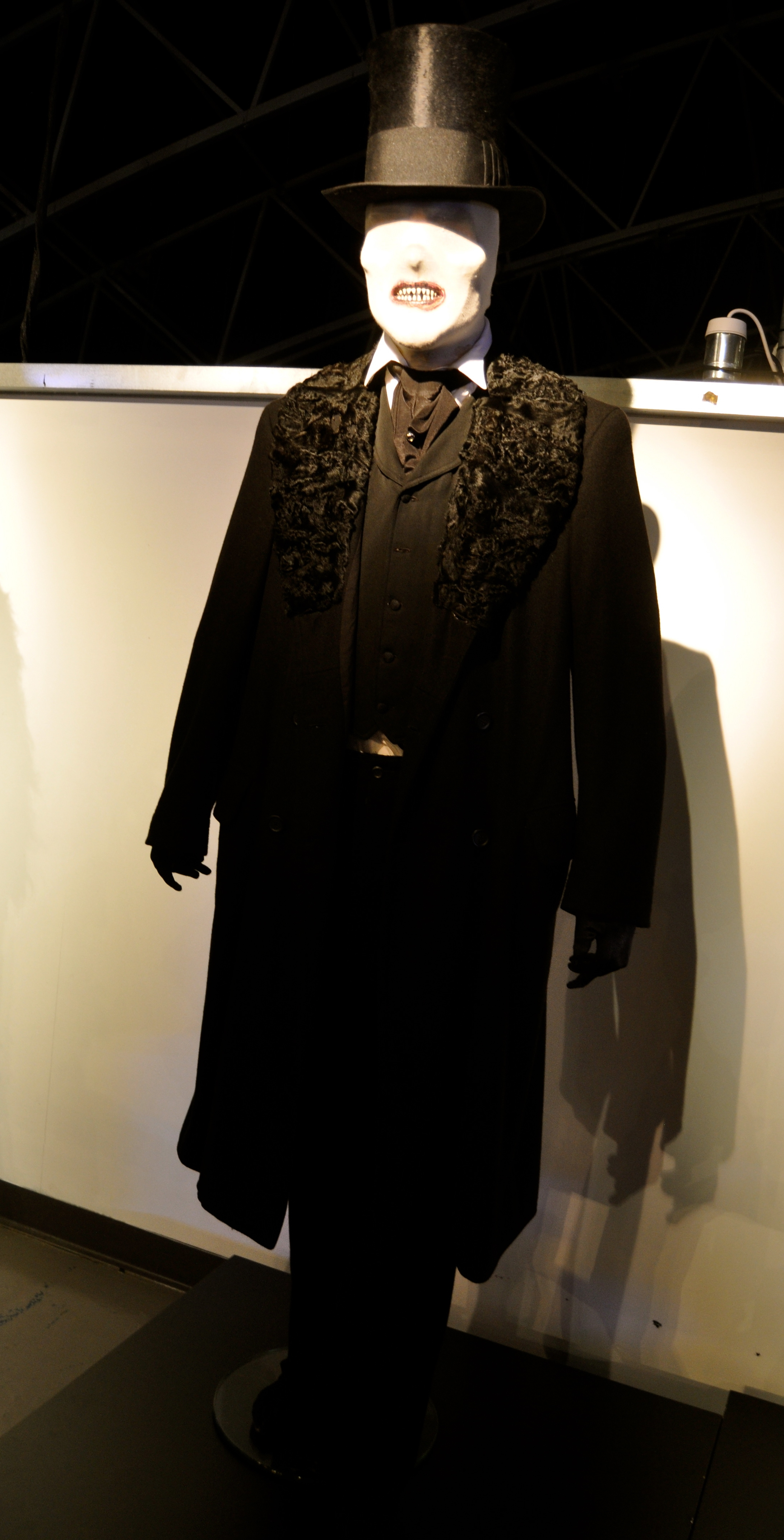
The Whisper Men as they appear at the Doctor Who Experience.

Lead writer Steven Moffat conceived of the episode's plot due to a realization that many of the season's episodes had been "frothy" and more light-hearted. Moffat wished to create a more funeral-like atmosphere, akin to that which appeared in the episode Logopolis (1981) which depicted the Fourth Doctor's regeneration. Moffat stated that he wanted to have a new monster in the finale, after the series had seen the reappearance of old monsters such as the Ice Warriors, Cybermen, and Daleks. The idea of the Whisper Men came from "the thought of stylish, whispering, almost faceless creatures" which seemed frightening and appropriate for "an episode that looks forward and back".

The first draft of the script was dated 1 November, 2012, and remained largely identical to the final script, though had several differences from the final version. The opening sequence – in which Clara falls through the time vortex – was instead going to have Clara wake up in a cottage and recount her splinters interacting with various Doctors. Clara would additionally have referenced seeing Amy Pond falling out of the Pandorica (as depicted in the 2010 episode "The Big Bang") and the Doctor's death at Lake Silencio (depicted on-screen in the 2011 episode "The Impossible Astronaut"), which would have had her face overlaid on top of crew members who had accidentally entered the shots of both scenes, with Moffat attempting to retcon both crew members as being splinters of Clara.

"The Name of the Doctor" was initially used in the first draft of the script, but all subsequent drafts referred to the title as "The Finale." The second draft of the script was dated to 7 November, 2012, with this script having several alterations from both the first and final versions. The episode's shooting script was dated to 15 November, 2012.

=== Filming ===
The episode was directed by Saul Metzstein. Work on the episode overlapped with production of "Nightmare in Silver" (2013). Certain sequences in the episode were recorded alongside "The Day of the Doctor" (2013)'s production block, instead of being recorded with the episode's production block. Shooting began on 16 November 2012 in Cardiff Bay, and concluded on 30 November. Green screen shots were filmed at the BBC's Roath Lock Studios. On 25 March and 25 April 2013, Metzstein also handled the shooting of the accompanying minisodes.

The episode contains archive footage of the Doctor's prior incarnations. Specifically video from of the First (from The Aztecs, 1964, with dialogue from The Web Planet, 1965), Second, Third (both from "The Five Doctors", 1983), Fourth (The Invasion of Time, 1978), Fifth (Arc of Infinity, 1983), and Seventh (Dragonfire, 1987) Doctors was shown. Stunt doubles were used for some other brief appearances, including the Sixth Doctor walking past Clara while she is in a corridor. Several Doctors can also be seen running past her in the Doctor's time stream. The clips of the first Doctor were colourised.

=== Casting ===
"The Name of the Doctor" stars Matt Smith and Jenna Coleman star as the Eleventh Doctor and Clara Oswald respectively. Many actors reprised their roles in the episode. Alex Kingston reprised her role as River Song, while Dan Starkey, Caitrin Stewart, and Neve McIntosh reprised their roles as Strax, Jenny, and Vastra of the Paternoster Gang, respectively. Richard E. Grant portrayed the Intelligence's human host, Dr. Simeon, reprising his role from "The Snowmen" (2012). Eve de Leon Allen and Kassius Carey Johnson additionally reprised their roles as Angie and Artie, two children Clara looks after, in the episode. Additional roles include Sophie Downham as the young Clara and Paul Kasey, who portrayed the Whisper Men.

John Hurt makes his first appearance as the War Doctor, an incarnation of the Doctor who fought in the Time War, a large war between the Doctor's species the Time Lords, and the Daleks. The War Doctor was introduced alongside text reading "Introducing John Hurt as The Doctor". To avoid spoilers the episode's script featured the caption with the name redacted. He would later appear in "The Night of the Doctor" and "The Day of the Doctor".

== Broadcast and reception ==
=== Mini-episodes ===
"The Name of the Doctor" was released alongside various mini-episodes. "She Said, He Said" is a mini-episode that acts as a prelude to "The Name of the Doctor", in which the Eleventh Doctor and Clara each have a monologue about how little they know about each other and that they discovered each other's secret at Trenzalore. It was released on 11 May 2013 on BBC Red Button and online. Viewers using Red Button were able to access the prologue between 7:40 and midnight every evening, until "The Name of the Doctor" aired on 18 May 2013. Also released to promote the episode were three "Strax Field Reports", in the first of which, subtitled "The Name of the Doctor", Strax informed the Sontarans of a great battle predicted to occur and admitting suspicions that it had to do with the Doctor's greatest secret. He informed Sontar that the operation was called "The Name of the Doctor". In the second, subtitled "A Glorious Day Is Almost Upon Us...", Strax discussed a 'glorious day' in which death was likely. The final field report – "The Doctor's Greatest Secret" – discussed the cliffhanger, commenting that this new Doctor had the appearance of a warrior. This was the only field report released after the episode.

=== Home media ===
On 12 May 2013, a week before the official premiere of "The Name of The Doctor", it was announced that 210 Doctor Who fans in the United States had received their Blu-ray box set of the second half of the seventh series early due to a production error. After successfully requesting that they not reveal the plot, the BBC sent the recipients copies of an interview with the cast. Moffat later complimented the "210 of them, with the top secret episode in their grasp – and because we asked nicely, they didn't breathe a word." The episode was released on DVD and Blu-ray regularly later in the month. It was subsequently re-released in October 2013 and August 14.

The home releases of the episodes feature an altered caption at the end of the episode. Instead of reading "Introducing John Hurt as the Doctor", it simply reads "To Be Continued".

=== Broadcast ===
"The Name of the Doctor" was released on BBC One on 18 May 2013. The overnight ratings estimated that it was seen by 5.46 million viewers upon its initial release. When viewers who watched the episode later on were taken into account, the figure rose to 7.45 million, making Doctor Who the third most-watched programme of the week on BBC One. The episode received an Appreciation Index of 88.

== Critical reception ==
Professional ratings
Review scores
Source	Rating
IGN	9.1/10
New York Magazine	4/5 stars
Radio Times	5/5 stars
SFX	5/5 stars
The A.V. Club	C+
The Telegraph	5/5 stars
TV Fanatic	5/5 stars

The episode received positive reviews. The Guardian described the episode as "the best episode of the season", and "possibly the best finale we've seen". Mark Snow of IGN gave the episode 9.1/10, praising the final conversation between the Doctor and River Song, as well as the revelation about Clara; however he noted that the Great Intelligence was "a little underwhelming" and "not very threatening", and that while the Whispermen impressed initially, they did not "[make] a great villain."

Michael Hogan of The Daily Telegraph said that the episode was an improvement on the previous two. He noted that it was "momentous, moving and thrilling". However, he also noted that the episode had "a tad too much clunking exposition, the odd spot of creaky CGI and some unconvincing metaphors about soufflés and leaves." Despite this, he called it a "breathless, brilliant finale". Patrick Mulkern of Radio Times praised the episode, highlighting the performances of the cast, the direction of Metzstein as director, and the reveal of John Hurt as the War Doctor.

The episode was nominated for the 2014 Hugo Awards for Best Dramatic Presentation (Short Form), along with several other Doctor Who related media including "The Day of the Doctor", An Adventure in Space and Time and The Five(ish) Doctors Reboot. The award was won by the Game of Thrones episode "The Rains of Castamere".

== Bibliography ==
- Ainsworth, John, ed. (16 May 2018). Doctor Who: The Complete History: The Crimson Horror, Nightmare in Silver, and The Name of the Doctor. Hachette Partworks, Panini Publishing.
