= British Academy Television Craft Award for Best Special, Visual & Graphic Effects =

Award for technical achievements in TV

British Academy Television Craft Award
- Country: United Kingdom
- Presented by: British Academy of Film and Television Arts
- First award: 2001
- Currently held by: Mohen Leo, TJ Falls, Luke Murphy, Neal Scanlan, Jean-Clément Soret & Industrial Light & Magic for Andor (2026)
- Website: http://www.bafta.org/

The British Academy Television Craft Award for Best Special, Visual & Graphic Effects is one of the categories presented by the British Academy of Film and Television Arts (BAFTA) within the British Academy Television Craft Awards, the craft awards were established in 2000 with their own, separate ceremony as a way to spotlight technical achievements, without being overshadowed by the main production categories. According to the BAFTA website, this category is "for special, visual and graphic effects and recognises achievement in all of these crafts."

The category has gone through several name changes:

- It was first awarded with the British Academy Television Craft Award for Best Titles & Graphic Identity category under the name Best Visual Effects and Graphic Design in 2001, 2002 and 2013.
- In 2003 it was split presenting the Best Visual Effects category until 2012.
- Since 2014, the category is presented as Best Special, Visual & Graphic Effects.

== Winners and nominees ==
=== 2000s ===
Best Visual Effects and Graphic Design

Year	Title	Recipient(s)	Broadcaster
2001	Gormenghast		BBC Two
2001	Longitude	Framestore	Channel 4
2001	Private Lives of the Pharaohs	Red Vision	Channel 4
2001	Horizon: Supermassive Black Holes	Simon Edgar, Gareth Edwards, Neil Cunningham	BBC Two
2002	Banzai	Blue Source	E4
2002	Building The Impossible: The Seven Wonders of The Ancient World	Atlantic Digital	BBC
2002	The Lost World	William Bartlett, Virgil Manning, Darren Byford	BBC One
2002	Walking with Beasts	Tim Greenwood, Max Tyrie, Jez Gibson-Harris, Mike Milne	BBC One

Best Visual Effects

Year	Title	Recipient(s)	Broadcaster
2003	Walking with Dinosaurs: The Giant Claw (Special)	Max Tyrie, Tim Greenwood, Jez Gibson-Harris	BBC One
2003	Hornblower	Phil Attfield	ITV
2003	Dinotopia	Mike McGee, Michael Eames, Alec Knox	ABC
2003	How the Twin Towers Collapsed	Red Vision	Discovery Channel
2004	Walking with Dinosaurs: Sea Monsters (Trilogy)	Max Tyrie, Tim Greenwood, Jez Gibson-Harris, Jamie Campbell	BBC One
2004	Ancient Egyptians: The Battle of Megiddo	Grahame Andrew, Rob Harvey, Julian Parry, Abbie Tucker-Williams	Channel 4
2004	George Orwell: A Life in Pictures	Aidan Farrell, Barney Jordan	BBC Two
2004	Walking with Dinosaurs: Land of The Giants (Special)	Max Tyrie, George Roper, Jez Gibson-Harris, Jamie Campbell	BBC One
2005	Battlefield Britain	Red Vision	BBC Two
2005	The Brighton Bomb	Steve Bowman, Mike Tucker	BBC One
2005	British Isles: A Natural History	David Corfield	BBC One
2005	Omagh		Channel 4
2006	Hiroshima	Red Vision, Mike Tucker, Gareth Edwards	BBC One
2006	Rome	Barrie Hemsley, James Madigan, Joe Pavlo	BBC Two
2006	Walking with Monsters	Framestore Team	BBC Three/BBC One
2006	Supervolcano	Lola	BBC One
2007	Terry Pratchett's Hogfather	Simon Thomas, Oliver Money	Sky1
2007	Death of a President	Lola	Channel 4
2007	Krakatoa: The Last Days	Lola, The Model Unit	BBC One
2007	Doctor Who	The Mill	BBC One
2008	Fight for Life	Jellyfish Pictures	BBC One
2008	Primeval	Matt Fox, Christian Manz, James Farrington	ITV
2008	Doctor Who (for "Voyage of the Damned")	The Mill	BBC One
2008	Rome		BBC Two
2009	Doctor Who (for "The Fires of Pompeii")	The Mill	BBC One
2009	Primeval	Christian Manz, Matt Fox, Mark Brocking	ITV
2009	The Wrong Door		BBC Three
2009	The Colour of Magic	Simon Thomas, Reuben Barkataki, Dave Throssell	Sky1

=== 2010s ===
Best Visual Effects

Year	Title	Recipient(s)	Broadcaster
2010	The Day of the Triffids	Tom Turnbull, Joel Collins, Rene Morel	BBC One
2010	Merlin	The Mill	BBC One
2010	Doctor Who	The Mill	BBC One
2010	World War II in Colour	Alan Griffiths, Matthew Barrett, Vivek Rao	Channel 5
2011	Merlin	The Mill	BBC One
2011	Wonders of the Solar System	Simon Clarke, Stephen Waugh	BBC Two
2011	Doctor Who	The Mill	BBC One
2011	Terry Pratchett's Going Postal	Simon Thomas, Reuben Barkataki, Zoltan Benyó	Sky1
2012	Great Expectations	BlueBolt	BBC One
2012	Wonders of the Universe	Burrell Durrant Hifle	BBC Two
2012	Doctor Who	The Mill	BBC One
2012	Inside the Human Body	Philip Dobree, Sophie Orde, Dan Upton	BBC One

Best Visual Effects and Graphic Design

Year	Title	Recipient(s)	Broadcaster
2013	Titanic	Tom Turnbull	ITV
2013	Doctor Who	The Mill	BBC One
2013	The Psychology of Winning	Robin Nurse, Julian Gibbs, Richard Gort	BBC One
2013	Parade's End	Rupert Ray, Benuts	BBC Two

Best Special, Visual & Graphic Effects

Year	Title	Recipient(s)	Broadcaster
2014	Doctor Who (for "The Day of the Doctor")	Milk VFX, Real SFX, The Model Unit	BBC One
2014	David Attenborough’s Natural History Museum Alive 3D	Zoo, Fido, Colossus	Sky 3D
2014	Peaky Blinders	BlueBolt (VFX), Rushes (Colourist)	BBC One
2014	Micro Monsters with David Attenborough (for "Predator")	Hollingworth Photography, British Technical Films, Colossus	Sky One
2015	Doctor Who	Milk VFX, Real SFX, BBC Wales VFX	BBC One
2015	David Attenborough's Conquest of the Skies 3D	Colossus Productions, Vision3, Zoo VFX	Sky 3D
2015	Atlantis	Vine FX, Colin Gorry	BBC One
2015	Ripper Street	Screen Scene	BBC One
2016	Jonathan Strange & Mr Norrell	Milk VFX	BBC One
2016	Fungus the Bogeyman	DNeg TV, Chris Rodgers	Sky One
2016	The Last Kingdom	BlueBolt	BBC Two
2016	Doctor Who	Milk VFX, Millennium FX, Real SFX, Molinare	BBC Two
2017	The Crown	One of Us, Molinare	Netflix
2017	The Night Manager	Bluebolt, Pau Costa Moeller	BBC One
2017	War & Peace	Bluebolt, Jens Doeldissen, Simone Grattarola	BBC One
2017	Sherlock: The Abominable Bride	Real SFX, Milk VFX, Kevin Horsewood	BBC One
2017	Playtest (Black Mirror)	Justin Hutchinson-Chatburn, Framestore, Glassworks, Baseblack	Netflix
2017	The Last Dragonslayer	Milk VFX, Chris Reynolds, Adam McInnes	Sky One
2018	Metalhead (Black Mirror)	Dneg TV, Jean-Clement Soret, Russell McLean, Joel Collins	Netflix
2018	Taboo	BlueBolt, Colin Gorry Effects Ltd., Adam Glasman, Rob Pizzey	BBC One
2018	The Crown	One of Us, Asa Shoul, Christopher Reynolds	Netflix
2018	Emerald City	Thomas Horton, Freefolk, Double Negative, Nvizible	5Star
2019	Troy: Fall of a City	Adam McInnes, John Smith, Kevin Horsewood	BBC One
2019	Bandersnatch (Black Mirror)	Glassworks, Jean-Clement Soret, Clayton McDermott, Mark Coulier	Netflix
2019	The Alienist (for "The Boy on the Bridge")	Kent Houston, Peerless, Freefolk, Asa Shoul	Netflix
2019	Britannia	Simon Frame, Martin Oberlander, Adam Inglis	Sky Atlantic

=== 2020s ===
Year	Title	Recipient(s)	Broadcaster
2020	His Dark Materials	Framestore, Painting Practice, Real SFX, Russell Dodgson	BBC One
2020	The Crown	Ben Turner, Chris Reynolds, Asa Shoul	Netflix
2020	Chernobyl	Lindsay McFarlane, Claudius Christian Rauch, Jean-Clément Soret, DNEG	Sky Atlantic
2020	Good Omens	Milk Visual Effects, Gareth Spensley, Real SFX	BBC Two
2021	His Dark Materials	Russell Dodgson, James Whitlam, Jean-Clement Soret, Robert Harrington, Dan May, Brian Fisher	BBC One
2021	The Crown	Ben Turner, Reece Ewing, Chris Reynolds, Asa Shoul, Framestore, Untold Studios	Netflix
2021	Cursed	Milk Visual Effects, DNEG TV, Freefolk, Goodbye Kansas Studios, Greg Fisher, Dave Houghton	Netflix
2021	War of the Worlds	Michael Illingworth, Oliver Milburn, Danny Hargreaves, Oliver Ogneux, Laura Usaite, Pedrom Dadgostar	Fox
2022	The Witcher (for "Episode 1")	Dadi Einarsson, Gavin Round, Aleksandar Pejic, Oliver Cubbage, Stefano Pepin, Jet Omoshebi	Netflix
2022	Earth At Night In Color	Adam Inglis, Tom Payne, Sam Livingstone, Silja Momsen-Livingstone	Apple TV+
2022	Intergalactic	Jean-Claude Deguara, Milk VFX, Egg VFX, Gareth Spensley, Real SFX	Sky One
2022	Black Holes: Heart of Darkness	Rob Harvey, Rasik Gorecha, Sam Reed, Alex Marlow, John Kennedy, Katherine Jamieson	BBC Two
2023	House of the Dragon	Angus Bickerton, Nikeah Forde, Asa Shoul, Mike Dawson, MPC, Pixomondo	Sky Atlantic
2023	Andor	Mohen Leo, TJ Falls, Richard Van Den Bergh, Jean-Clément Soret, Industrial Light & Magic	Disney+
2023	His Dark Materials	Russell Dodgson, Bryony Duncan, Sam Chynoweth, Damien Stumpf, Danny Hargreaves, Eliot Gibbins	BBC One
2023	The Sandman	Industrial Light & Magic	Netflix
2024	The Witcher	Tim Crosbie, Caimin Bourne, Jet Omoshebi, Dan Weir, Cinesite, David Stephens	Netflix
2024	The Wheel of Time	Andy Scrase, Patricia Llaguno, Beau Garcia, Oliver Winwood, Huw Evans, Jodie Davidson	Prime Video
2024	The Crown	Ben Turner, Reece Ewing, Framestore, Rumble VFX, Asa Shoul, Chris Reynolds	Netflix
2024	Silo	Daniel Rauchwerger, Stefano Pepin, Richard Stanbury, Raphael Hamm, Ian Fellows	Apple TV+
2025	The Lord of the Rings: The Rings of Power	Jason Smith, Richard Bain, Ryan Conder, Chris Rodgers	Prime Video
2025	Silo	Daniel Rauchwerger, Raphael Hamm, Stefano Pepin, Richard Stanbury, Ian Fellows, Paul Bongiovanni	Apple TV+
2025	Masters of the Air	Neil Corbould, Caimin Bourne, Stuart Heath, Glen Winchester	Apple TV+
2025	House of the Dragon	Dadi Einarsson, Thomas Horton, Lev Kolobov, Mike Dawson, Asa Shoul, Pixomondo	Sky Atlantic
2026	Andor	Mohen Leo, TJ Falls, Luke Murphy, Neal Scanlan, Jean-Clément Soret, Industrial Light & Magic	Disney+
2026	Prehistoric Planet: Ice Age	Russell Dodgson, Framestore, Andy Jones, Simon Bland, François Dumoulin, Gavin McKenzie	Apple TV
2026	USS Callister: Into Infinity (Black Mirror)	James MacLachlan, Josie Henwood, Union VFX, Stargate Studios Malta, Magic Lab, Sam Chynoweth	Netflix
2026	The Witcher	Sara Bennett, Richard Reed, David Stephens, Jet Omoshebi, Caimin Bourne, Scanline	Netflix

- Note: The series that don't have recipients on the table had FX Team credited as the recipients of the award or nomination.

== See also ==
- Primetime Emmy Award for Outstanding Special Visual Effects
- Primetime Emmy Award for Outstanding Special Visual Effects in a Supporting Role
