= Thomas Mathew =

Thomas Mathew may refer to:

- Thomas Mathew (burgess), English merchant, and planter and politician in the Colony of Virginia
- Thomas Mathew (cricketer), Indian cricketer
- M. Thomas Mathew, Indian literary critic

== See also ==
- Thomas Matthew, English merchant and politician
- Thomas Matthews (disambiguation)
