= Diana Dondoe =

Romanian model

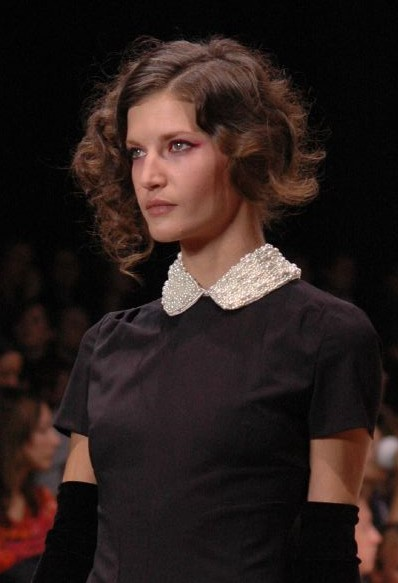
- Diana Dondoe at Paul Smith Women fall 2007 fashion show, London Fashion Week.
- Born: December 22, 1982 (age 43); Craiova, Romania
- Modeling information
- Height: 1.77 m (5 ft 10 in)
- Hair color: Brown
- Eye color: Green

Diana Dondoe (born December 22, 1982) is a Romanian model. She was discovered in Bucharest, Romania by Giani Portmann, a Romanian modelling scout. Dondoe resides in New York City, USA. Aside from modelling she is a student majoring in English and Spanish.

She appeared in many campaigns such as: Chanel, Miu Miu, Prada, Celine, Donna Karan, Moschino, Jean-Paul Gaultier, La Perla, Balenciaga and the Swedish clothing manufacturer H&M's beachwear collection. In 2009 she appeared in Rock and Republics' Spring and Summer ad campaign with Cartwright Lee. She also appeared on the covers of French Vogue, Japanese Vogue, Spanish Vogue, Self Service, ID Magazine, W, 10 Magazine and Flair. She was on the inaugural cover of WSJ.

In 2005, she posed for the Pirelli Calendar set in a tropical scenery of Rio de Janeiro, photographed in black and white by the French photographer Patrick Demarchelier.

In 2009, Dondoe appeared in the fashion documentary Picture Me: A Model's Diary, where the filmmaker Ole Schell documents the rise of model Sara Ziff. She lives in Paris, France, with her companion, French actor Xavier Lemaître.

In 2026 a photo of her from the February 2004 issue of Italian Vogue went viral because she was featured in along side Rob Sand who was elected Governor of Iowa in the 2026 midterm election. Dondoe and Sand were in a black and white photograph where they were dressed in Rockabilly style clothing and she was blowing cigarette smoke in his face.

== Agencies ==
IMG Models (New York City, United States)
IMG Models (London, United Kingdom)
IMG Models (Milan, Italy)
IMG Models (Paris, France)
