= Missed Call (TV series) =

2026 British TV series

- Genre: Drama
- Created by: Samuel Kissous; Matthew Thomas
- Written by: Matthew Thomas; Sally Abott; Paul Matthew Thompson
- Screenplay by: Matthew Thomas
- Directed by: Sheree Folkson
- Starring: Joanna Scanlan; Emily Coates
- Country of origin: United Kingdom
- Original language: English
- No. of series: 1
- No. of episodes: 5

Production
- Producers: Sebastian Cardwell; Samuel Kissous; Paul Testar

Original release
- Network: Channel 5
- Release: 13 April – 17 April 2026

Missed Call is a British drama television series which premiered on 13 April 2026 on Channel 5 and concluded on 17 April.

== Synopsis ==
The series follows a mother Sarah Gleason (Joanna Scanlan) who travels to France to find her teenage daughter Katie (Emily Coates) has disappeared while on a trip. Sarah arrives in the fictional town of Saint-Michel but is met with hostility from the host family.

== Cast ==
- Joanna Scanlan as Sarah Gleason
- Emily Coates as Katie Gleason
- Claire Keim as Lieutenant Virginie Taylor
- Andrew-Lee Potts as Mark Jones
- Rupert Graves as Jason Bradley
- François-Xavier Demaison as Captain Jerome Ricard
- Robert Lindsay as Andrew Taylor
- Dean Fagan as Neil Scott
- Hélène Azema as Yvette Henin
- Nicolas Van Beveren as Fabien Morvan
- Cole Martin as Ben
- Lise Laffont as Audrey Lambert
- Daisy Axon as Lucy
- Maxime Pipet as Xavier Henin
- Xavier Lemaître as Serge Henin
- Celia Diane as Caroline Morvan
- Thorian Jackson De Decker as Major Remy
- Sandra Teles as Rebecca
- Arthur Combelles as Gabriel the Pathologist
- Oliver Jenkins as British Reporter
- Lya Oussadit-Lessert as Emma Morvan

== Development ==
Missed Call is a five-episode series. The series was filmed in Montpellier. Casting was announced in 2025. The cast includes British and French actors.

== Reception ==
A reviewer for the Scottish Herald gave the series 3 stars out of 5. Good Housekeeping called it a "spine-chilling drama".
