= The Day of the Doctor =

2013 special episode of Doctor Who

240 – "The Day of the Doctor"
- Doctor Who episode
- Promotional poster

Cast
- Doctors: Matt Smith – Eleventh Doctor; David Tennant – Tenth Doctor; John Hurt – War Doctor
- Companion: Jenna Coleman – Clara Oswald
- Others: Billie Piper – Rose Tyler (Note: Although credited as playing Rose, Piper portrays the sentient conscience of "The Moment", a character using Rose's appearance in the form of the "Bad Wolf" persona.); Tristan Beint – Tom; Jemma Redgrave – Kate Lethbridge-Stewart; Ingrid Oliver – Osgood; Chris Finch – Time Lord Soldier; Peter de Jersey – Androgar; Ken Bones – The General; Philip Buck – Arcadia Father; Sophie Morgan-Price – Time Lord; Joanna Page – Queen Elizabeth I; Orlando James – Lord Bentham; Jonjo O'Neill – McGillop; Tom Keller – Atkins; Aidan Cook, Paul Kasey – Zygons; Nicholas Briggs – Voice of the Daleks & Zygons; Barnaby Edwards, Nicholas Pegg – Daleks; John Guilor – Voice Over Artist; Peter Capaldi – Twelfth Doctor (uncredited); Tom Baker – The Curator (uncredited)

Production
- Directed by: Nick Hurran
- Written by: Steven Moffat
- Produced by: Marcus Wilson
- Executive producers: Steven Moffat; Faith Penhale
- Music by: Murray Gold
- Series: 2013 specials
- Running time: 77 minutes
- First broadcast: 23 November 2013

Chronology
| ← Preceded by "The Name of the Doctor" (Note: Also preceded by mini-episodes "The Night of the Doctor" and "The Last Day") | Followed by → "The Time of the Doctor" |

"The Day of the Doctor" is a special episode of the BBC science fiction television series Doctor Who, broadcast on 23 November 2013 to commemorate the series's 50th anniversary. It was written by Steven Moffat, directed by Nick Hurran and produced by Marcus Wilson. Moffat and Faith Penhale served as executive producers. It stars series regulars Matt Smith and Jenna Coleman, with David Tennant and Billie Piper returning alongside John Hurt as a previously unseen incarnation of the Doctor. It is the first of two 2013 Doctor Who specials, the second being "The Time of the Doctor".

In the episode, the War Doctor (Hurt) prepares to use a sentient superweapon called the Moment (Piper) to bring an end to the Time War between the Daleks and his own people, the Time Lords. The Moment introduces him to his future incarnations, the Tenth Doctor (Tennant) and Eleventh Doctor (Smith). With help from Clara Oswald (Coleman), the three Doctors uncover a Zygon plot in Elizabethan England whilst seeking a solution to the War Doctor's ethical dilemma. The guest cast include Joanna Page as Elizabeth I, Jemma Redgrave as Kate Lethbridge-Stewart and Ingrid Oliver as Osgood.

"The Day of the Doctor" continued Doctor Who's tradition of "multi-Doctor" anniversary stories. As Christopher Eccleston declined to return as the Ninth Doctor, his role in the narrative was filled via the creation of the War Doctor, a retroactively-inserted incarnation preceding the Ninth Doctor. The special saw the second appearance of the shapeshifting Zygons since their introduction in Terror of the Zygons (1975). Shot in 3D from March to May 2013, the special contains various easter eggs and references to Doctor Who's 50 year history while introducing new incarnations of the Doctor and the return of his home planet Gallifrey, as part of Moffat's effort to "change the narrative" of the series.

The special was simultaneously broadcast in 94 countries, and was screened in cinemas both domestically and abroad. It achieved the Guinness World Record for the largest ever simulcast of a TV drama and won the Audience Award at the 2014 British Academy Television Awards. It was also nominated for the Ray Bradbury Award and the Hugo Award for Best Dramatic Presentation, Short Form. The episode was watched by 12.8 million viewers in the UK and received positive reviews from critics.

== Plot ==
In 2013, the Eleventh Doctor and Clara Oswald are brought by military organisation UNIT head Kate Lethbridge-Stewart to the National Gallery to investigate figures missing from three-dimensional paintings—a technology developed by the Doctor's people, the Time Lords. In 1562, an earlier incarnation of the Doctor, the Tenth Doctor, discovers that shapeshifting Zygons have infiltrated the court of Elizabeth I.

In the midst of the destructive Time War between the Time Lords and the Daleks, the War Doctor—an even earlier incarnation of the Doctor—plans to trigger a sentient superweapon called the Moment to destroy both sides. The Moment's humanoid interface, resembling Rose Tyler, opens a fissure bringing all three Doctors together to 1562 England. The Doctors discover that the Zygons are entering the three-dimensional paintings to freeze themselves in suspended animation. The Zygons break out of the paintings in 2013 and take the forms of UNIT staff, including Stewart, per their plan to colonise Earth with UNIT's advanced technology kept in the Tower of London.

The real Stewart confronts her Zygon double and starts a countdown for a nuclear warhead beneath the Tower that will destroy UNIT's technology along with London. The three Doctors, unable to land their TARDIS in the Tower, use the stasis technology to enter a painting which was relocated to the Tower. The Doctors use UNIT's mind-wiping equipment to make Stewart and her Zygon double temporarily unaware of their true identities. They stop the countdown and both sides negotiate a peace treaty.

The War Doctor, convinced that detonating the Moment will save more lives in the long term, returns to the Time War. The other Doctors follow him and reluctantly agree to shoulder the responsibility of destroying the Time Lords' planet Gallifrey, but Clara insists that there must be a peaceful solution. Aided by ten of their other incarnations, including an incarnation from their future, the Doctors use the stasis technology to attempt to suspend Gallifrey in a pocket universe. Gallifrey vanishes and the surrounding Dalek warships obliterate themselves in the crossfire.

The three Doctors and Clara return to the National Gallery, unsure whether their plan worked. After the War Doctor and Tenth Doctor leave, the Eleventh Doctor meets the National Gallery's elderly curator, who resembles the Doctor's fourth incarnation. He implies that Gallifrey was indeed saved but is now "lost". Reflecting on his dreams, the Eleventh Doctor vows to find Gallifrey and return home.

"I have a new destination. My journey is the same as yours, the same as anyone's. It's taken me so many years, so many lifetimes, but at last I know where I'm going. Where I've always been going. Home, the long way round."

— The Eleventh Doctor

== Cast ==
=== The Doctor ===
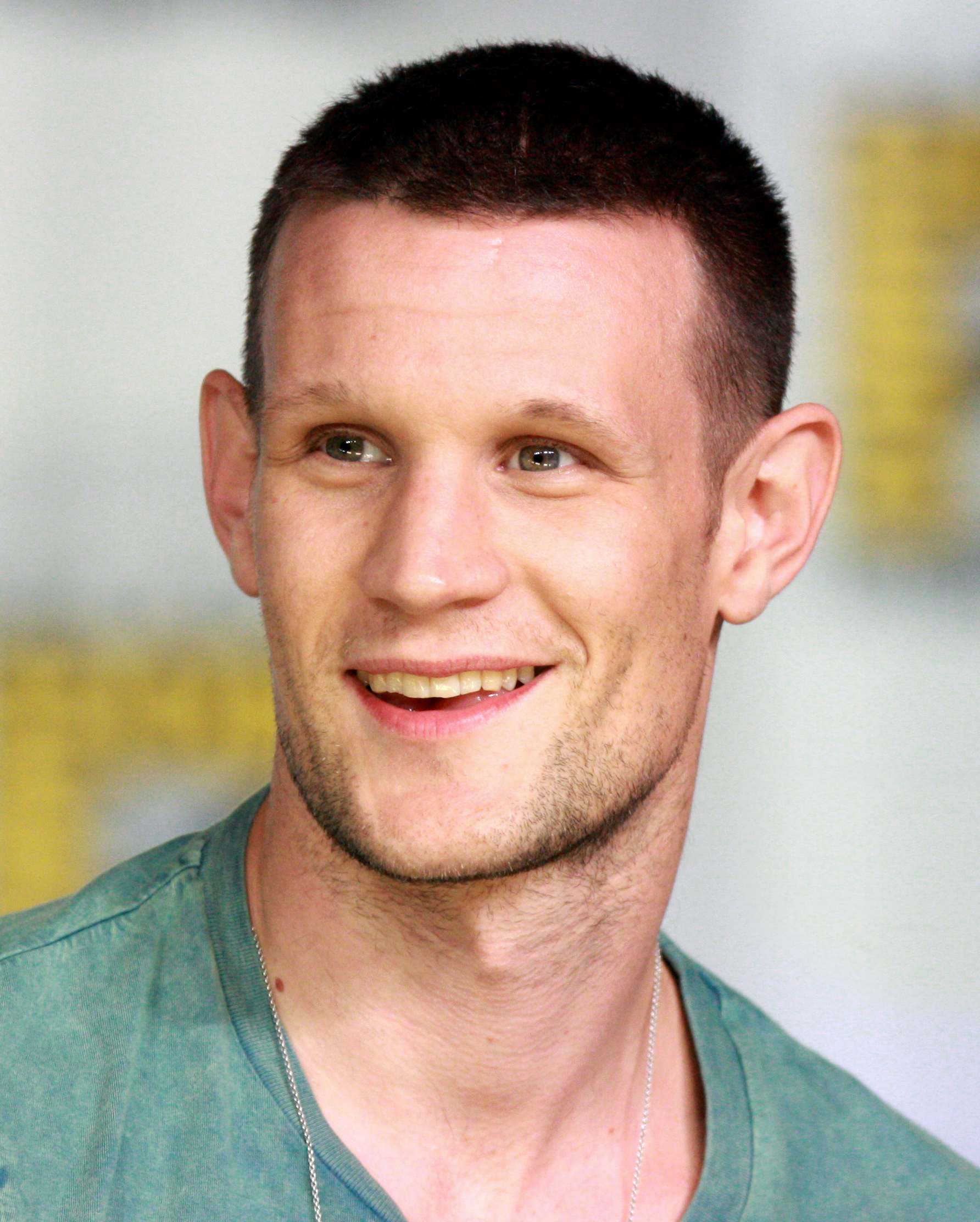
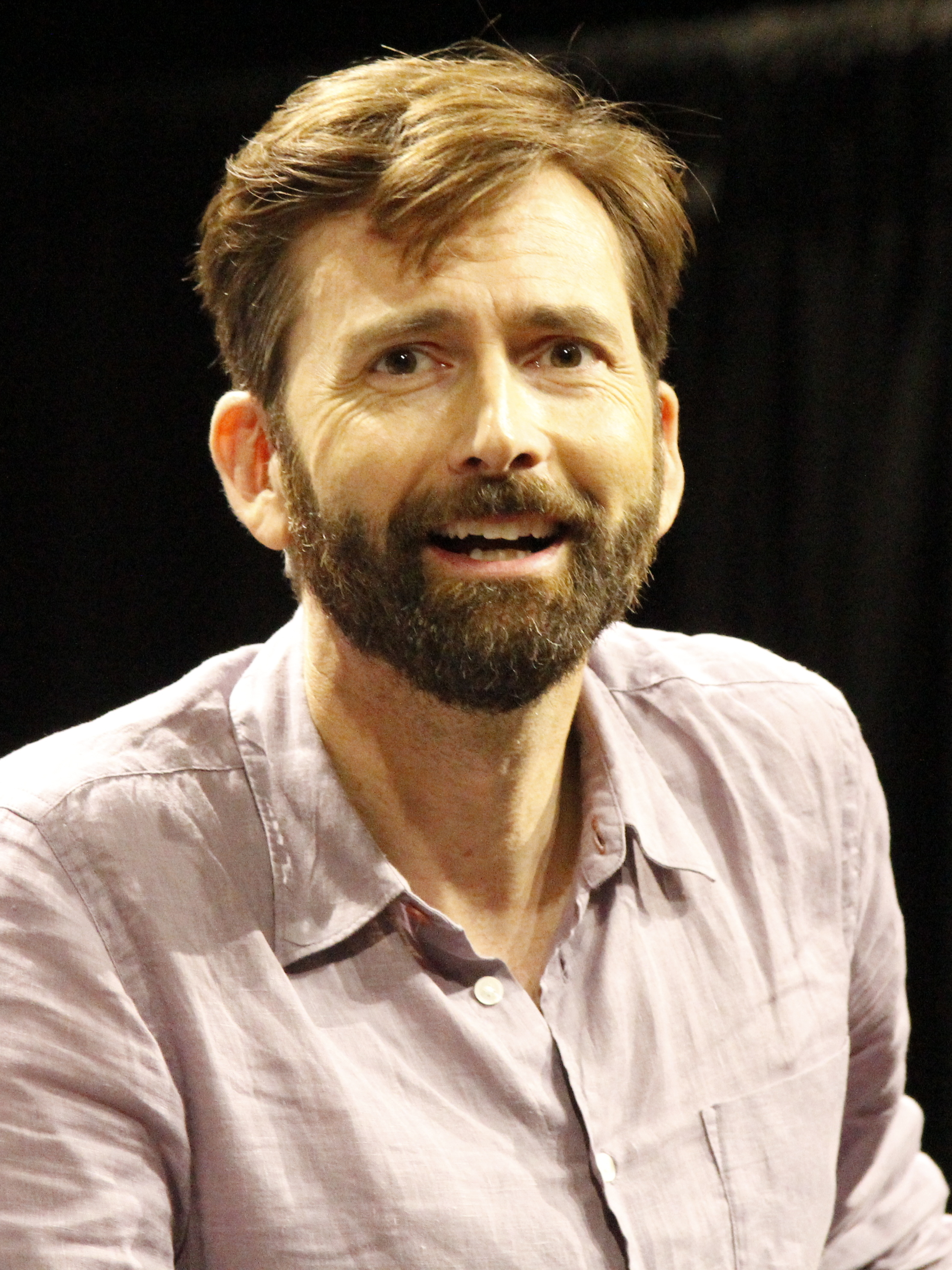
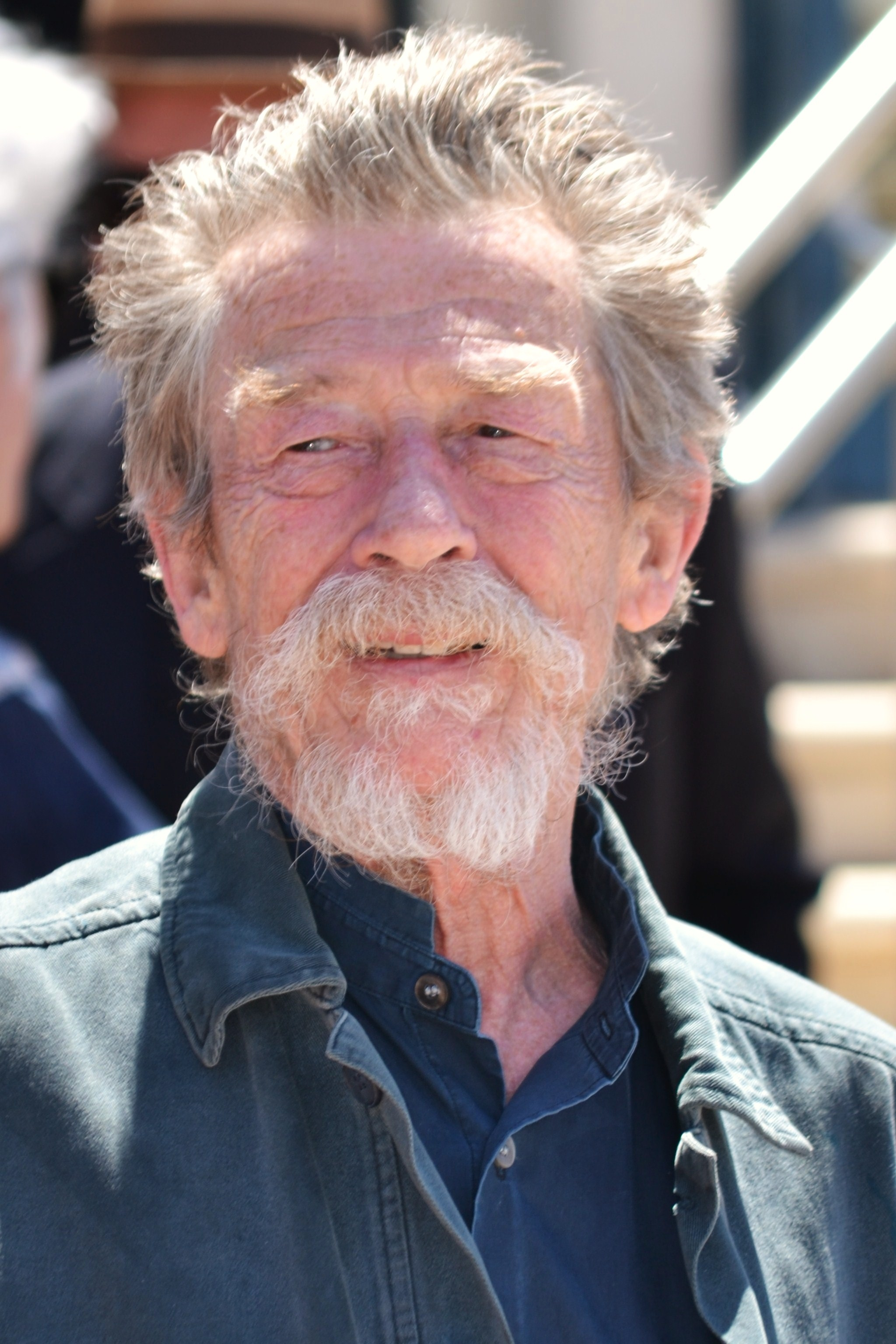
Matt Smith, David Tennant and John Hurt portrayed three different incarnations of the Doctor.
- Matt Smith as the Eleventh Doctor, the incumbent incarnation of the Doctor when the special aired.
- David Tennant as the Tenth Doctor. Tennant headlined the series from 2005 to 2010.
- John Hurt as the War Doctor, (Note: Hurt's character is referred to as the "Other Doctor" in the script, though subsequent BBC media calls him the "War Doctor".) a "forgotten" incarnation who fought in the Time War. Within the series's narrative, he is placed between the Eighth Doctor and Ninth Doctor.
- Archive footage is used of Christopher Eccleston, Paul McGann, Sylvester McCoy, Colin Baker, Peter Davison, Tom Baker, Jon Pertwee, Patrick Troughton and William Hartnell as the Ninth, Eighth, Seventh, Sixth, Fifth, Fourth, Third, Second and First Doctor respectively; they are collectively credited as "The Doctor" alongside Smith, Tennant and Hurt.
- John Guilor provided voice-over work for the First Doctor during the climactic Gallifrey sequence.
- Peter Capaldi is briefly seen in an uncredited appearance as the Twelfth Doctor; he took over the lead role from Smith in the following episode, "The Time of the Doctor" (2013).
- Tom Baker makes an uncredited appearance as the Curator, implied to be a future incarnation of the Doctor who has "revisited" the Fourth Doctor's form.

=== Others ===
- Jenna Coleman as Clara Oswald, the Eleventh Doctor's companion (Note: The special was the first time Coleman was credited on the series as Jenna Coleman, rather than Jenna-Louise Coleman as in previous episodes.)
- Billie Piper as the likeness of Rose Tyler, which is used by the Moment, a sentient Gallifreyan weapon of mass destruction.
- Tristan Beint as Tom, a schoolteacher
- Jemma Redgrave as Kate Lethbridge-Stewart and her Zygon duplicate
- Ingrid Oliver as Osgood, a UNIT scientist, and her Zygon duplicate
- Chris Finch as a Time Lord soldier
- Peter de Jersey as Androgar, a Time Lord
- Ken Bones as The General, a Time Lord
- Philip Buck as Arcadia father
- Sophie Morgan-Price as a Time Lord
- Joanna Page as Queen Elizabeth I and her Zygon duplicate
- Orlando James as Lord Bentham
- Jonjo O'Neill as McGillop and his Zygon duplicate
- Tom Keller as Atkins
- Aidan Cook and Paul Kasey as Zygons
- Nicholas Briggs as the voice of the Daleks and the Zygons
- Barnaby Edwards and Nicholas Pegg as Daleks

== Production ==
=== Development ===
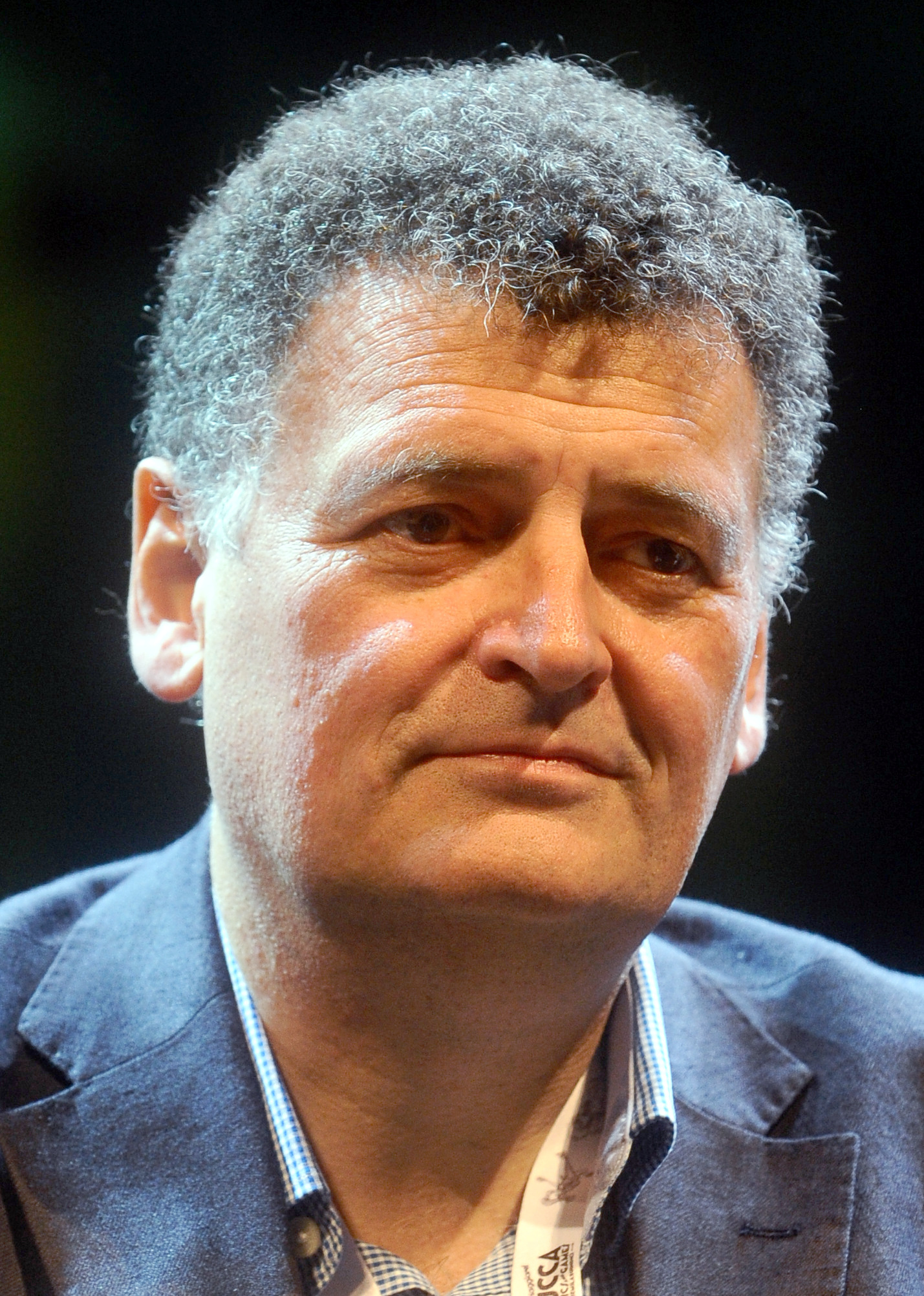
Steven Moffat stated "The Day of the Doctor" was the episode he was most proud of as Doctor Who showrunner.

Head writer Steven Moffat was developing a commemorative 50th anniversary episode of Doctor Who as early as late 2011, when he stated the production team were "revving up for it". He scripted the final episode of series 7, "The Name of the Doctor" (2013), to end with the Eleventh Doctor (Matt Smith) entering his timestream to rescue Clara Oswald (Jenna Coleman). Moffat had "no idea what [the Doctor would] find there. I just knew that whatever he found there would launch the 50th."

Doctor Who traditionally celebrates its anniversaries with "multi-Doctor" stories. All surviving actors who played the Doctor were invited to reprise their roles in The Three Doctors (1972–1973), "The Five Doctors" (1983) and Dimensions in Time (1993). However, Moffat personally felt this was something of a false tradition as The Three Doctors aired a year ahead of the tenth anniversary. He noted the impossibility of balancing eleven characters in a single storyline, and also quipped that a story with eleven Doctors is impossible as the three of the actors (William Hartnell, Patrick Troughton and Jon Pertwee) had died. Moffat wanted to focus on a key turning point in the Doctor's life which would "change the narrative" of the series and propel it into the next 50 years. He decided this key moment would be the Doctor's destruction of his home planet Gallifrey in the Time War, an off-screen event cryptically referenced in previous series. His "first version" of the script primarily involved the Doctor's three most recent incarnations, as played by Smith, David Tennant and Christopher Eccleston. An incomplete draft, titled "Time War", was completed on 14 January 2013. Moffat did not produce any physical copies as a security precaution. On 17 February, Nick Hurran revealed that he would be directing the special.

=== Casting ===
Due to the stress and anticipation surrounding the 50th anniversary, Moffat described the special's development as "a tough, tough time". As Coleman was initially the only performer contracted for the special, Moffat developed a substitute plotline where after the Doctor is wiped from existence, Clara encounters various alternative incarnations of the Doctor portrayed by famous guest stars. Smith and Tennant ultimately came on board, but Eccleston declined to reprise his role of the Ninth Doctor following meetings with Moffat. Eccleston explained in 2019 that the script did not do justice to the character; additionally he was still hurt by the BBC's actions during his tenure. Moffat pitched a solution to BBC higher-ups to excuse Eccleston's absence: "What if there was an incarnation of the Doctor none of us knew about? And, coincidentally, he was played by the most famous actor in the world?" John Hurt, Moffat's first choice to portray this incarnation, accepted "with remarkable speed". His incarnation, the War Doctor, is retroactively placed between Paul McGann's Eighth Doctor and Eccleston's Ninth Doctor. The War Doctor's battered costume signified that he was "a rougher, tougher Doctor" and Hurt's request to keep his beard added to this effect. Hurt's surprise cameo in the final scene of "The Name of the Doctor" was recorded by Hurran on 5 April 2013.

"... it's very rare in Doctor Who that the story happens to the Doctor... In this, he is the story of the week. This is the day of the Doctor. This is his most important day. His most important moment. This is the one he'll remember, whereas I often think the Doctor wanders back to his TARDIS and forgets all about it."

— Moffat in a 2013 interview with SFX

Moffat included appearances from the Daleks, the series's most iconic villains, as well as the Zygons, fan-favourite monsters who had appeared only once before in the 1975 serial Terror of the Zygons. The Zygons were played by Aidan Cook and Paul Kasey, who had both portrayed monsters in the series. Cook researched the movement of similar-looking bottom feeders at an aquarium for his Zygon performance. The Moment, a sentient superweapon, was not initially intended to be played by Billie Piper. Moffat wanted to include Piper as a nod to the series's 2005 revival, but was reluctant to bring back her character Rose Tyler since her storyline had already concluded. Piper and Tennant's involvement in the special leaked a few days before the official announcement as some subscribers to Doctor Who Magazine accidentally received their issue early. Knowing that Smith would soon be leaving the series, Moffat also included a cameo from the as-yet-uncast Twelfth Doctor. The first complete draft script, titled "Doctor Who: 50th Anniversary Special", was completed on 28 February 2013. The special was later retitled "The Day of the Doctor".

Jemma Redgrave portrayed UNIT head Kate Lethbridge-Stewart and her Zygon duplicate. This was Redgrave's second appearance in the role after "The Power of Three" (2012). (Note: The role was previously played by Beverley Cressman in the direct-to-video spin-off films Downtime (1995) and Dæmos Rising (2004).) Sophie Morgan-Price, who portrayed a Time Lord in the episode, was Redgrave's uncredited double for scenes when Stewart interacts with her Zygon duplicate. Joanna Page was cast as Queen Elizabeth I. Page is the third actress to portray Elizabeth I on Doctor Who, following Vivienne Bennet in The Chase (1965) and Angela Pleasence in "The Shakespeare Code" (2007). Ingrid Oliver was cast as the newly-introduced UNIT scientist Osgood—Moffat supposed that the character was related to UNIT officer Sergeant Osgood, played by Alec Linstead, from the 1971 serial The Dæmons.

Tom Baker, who played the Fourth Doctor from 1974 to 1981, was cast as the mysterious "Curator" of the National Gallery, implied to be a future incarnation of the Doctor. Baker considered turning down the role, but was convinced by then-producer Caroline Skinner with the promise he could "tamper with the script". Moffat stated it was "irresistible" for the anniversary special to feature Baker, as the longest-serving and oldest actor to play the Doctor. In 2017, Moffat stated that "The Day of the Doctor" was the episode he was most proud of from his time as showrunner.

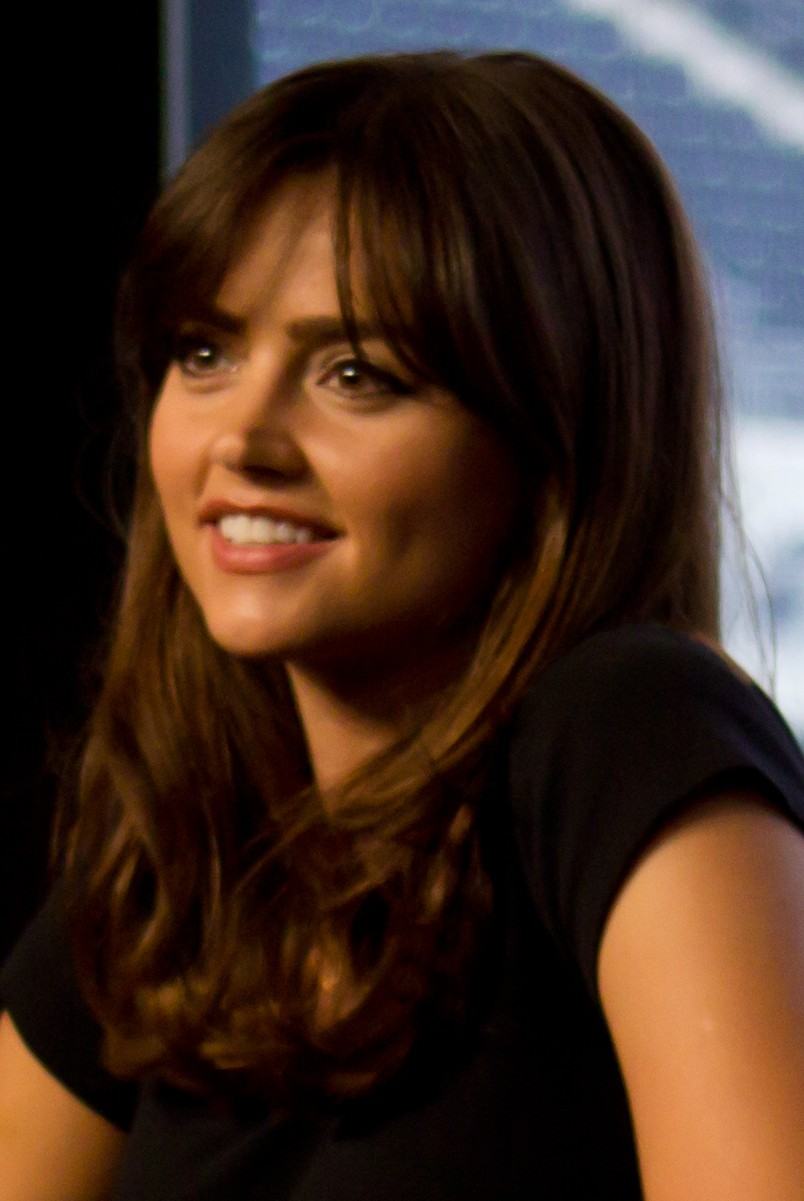
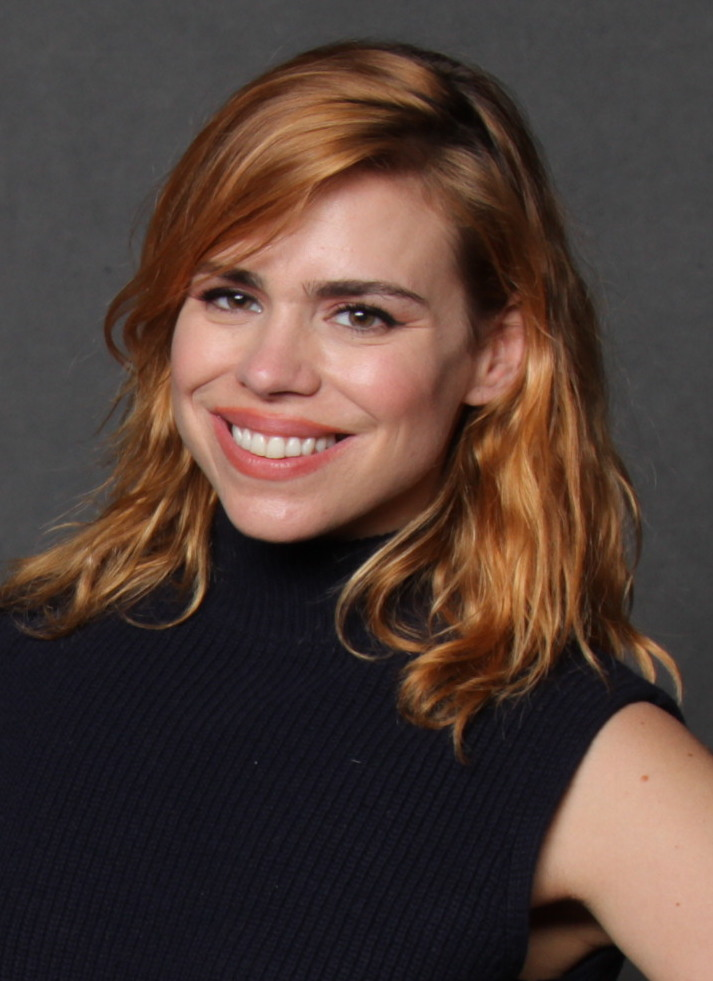
Jenna Coleman and Billie Piper, who portrayed the Doctor's companions, appeared in the episode, though Piper portrayed the Moment rather than reprising her role as Rose Tyler.

=== Principal photography ===
The BBC had trialled 3D broadcasting since summer 2011, and it was decided that "The Day of the Doctor" would be recorded and broadcast in 3D. Doctor Who's 30th anniversary special, Dimensions in Time, had similarly been filmed in 3D. Moffat incorporated three-dimensional elements into the script, such as the Gallifreyan paintings and Clara's motorbiking into the TARDIS, to highlight the medium.

On 13 March 2013, Caroline Skinner stepped down as Doctor Who's executive producer, with Faith Penhale taking over the position. Filming was set to begin on 18 March but pushed back to 27 March, which was dedicated to 3D camera tests and additional content. Principal photography began on 28 March at Doctor Who's production base at Roath Lock Studios in Cardiff. The first three days of recording included scenes set in the National Gallery and the Eleventh Doctor's TARDIS. Exterior filming began on 2 April at the Ivy Tower in Tonna, Neath, with the Tenth Doctor and Elizabeth I's horse riding sequence. Tennant found it difficult to recapture his Doctor's performance until he re-watched "The Stolen Earth"/"Journey's End" (2008). The three actors playing the Doctor first assembled on 3 April to shoot TARDIS scenes and the ending dream sequence. The dream sequence with twelve Doctors was achieved with stand-ins wearing original costumes. Hurt's character was named "Omega" on call sheets to prevent plot leaks.

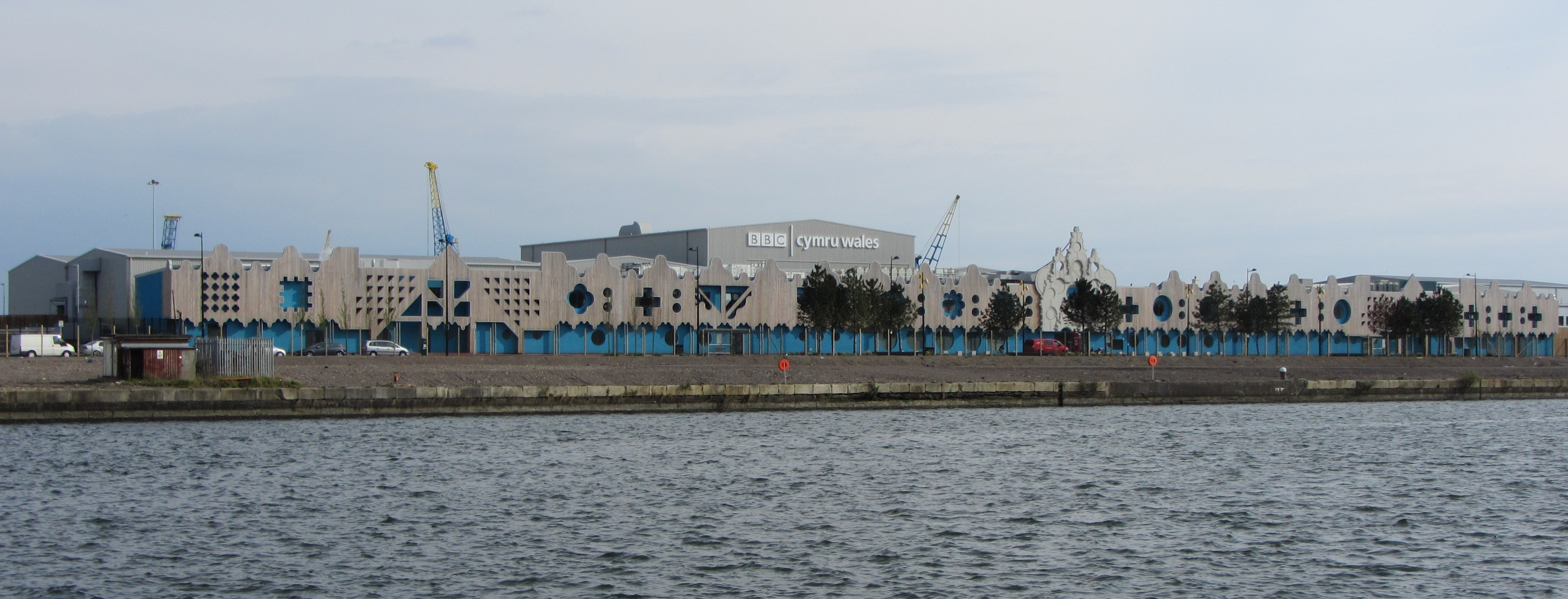
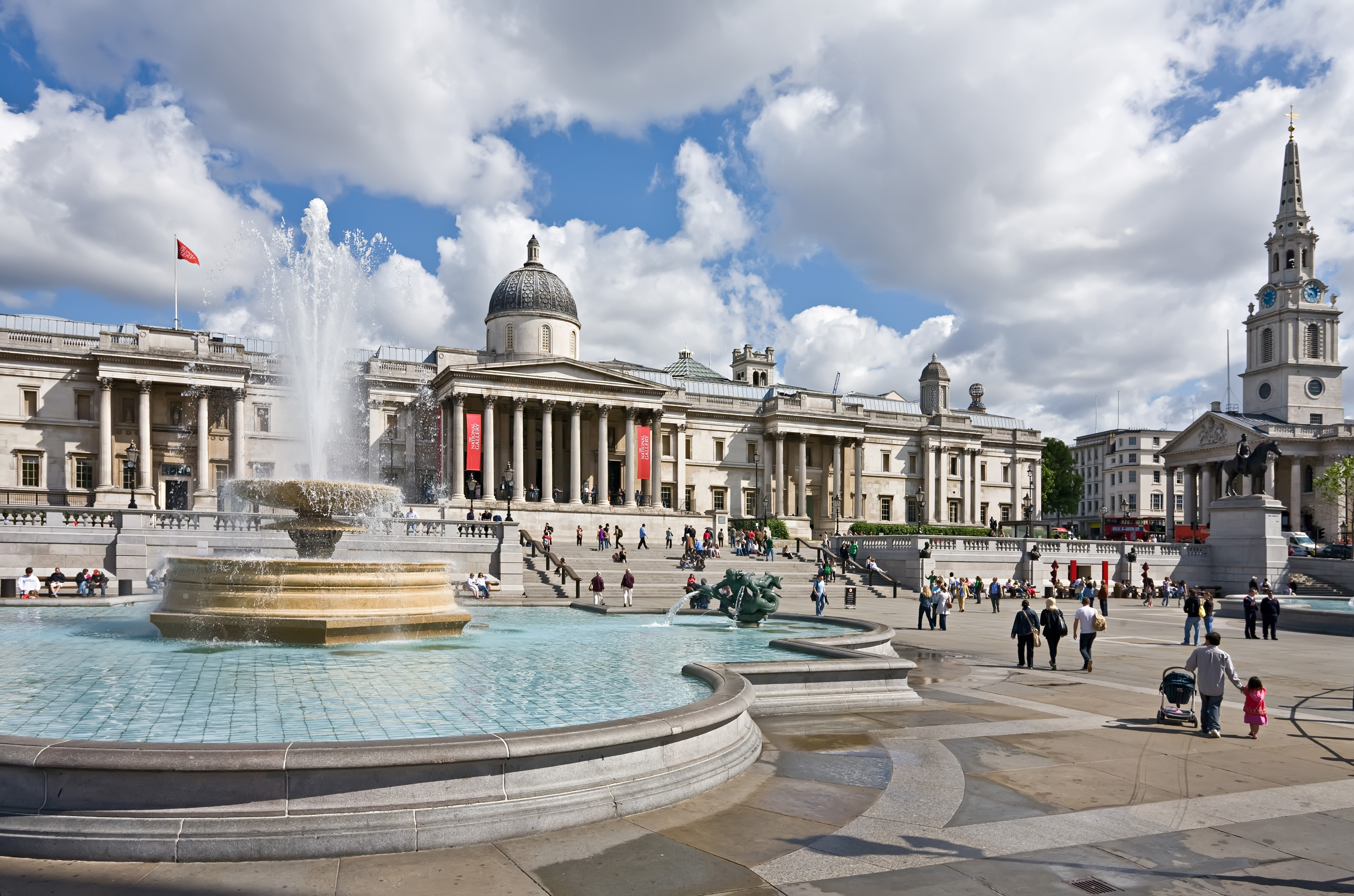
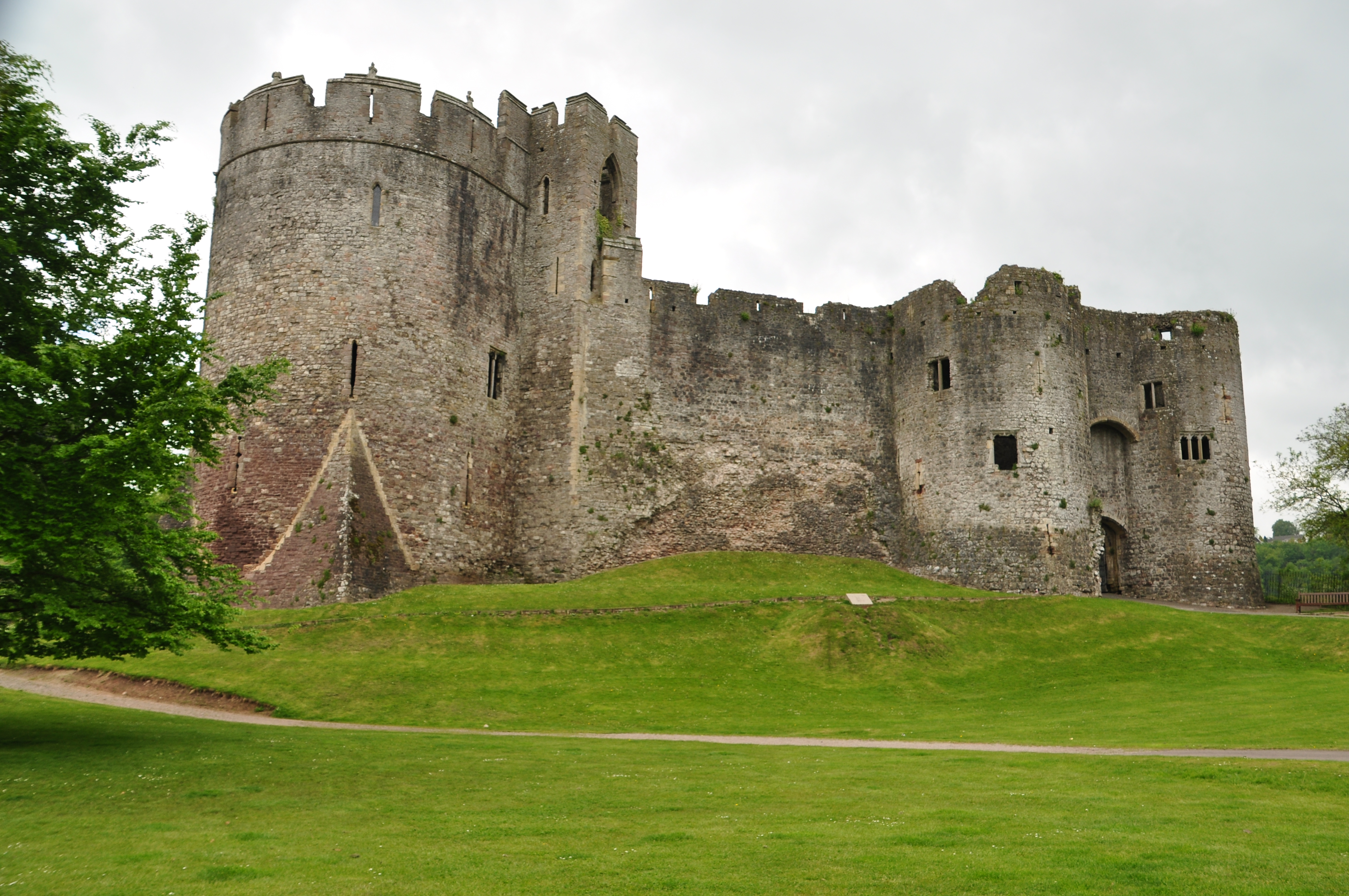
Filming took place at Roath Lock Studios, Trafalgar Square and Chepstow Castle.

The TARDIS was filmed on Gelligaer Common Road in Bedlinog on 4 April. Part of the opening action sequence was shot on 6 April at MOD St Athan. Production subsequently moved to London. Coleman, Redgrave and Oliver shot scenes at the Tower of London on 8 April. On the morning of 9 April, Smith hanged from the crane-hoisted TARDIS above Trafalgar Square as part of the special's opening action sequence. The public shoot attracted massive crowds and was reported on prominently in the media. From 10 to 12 April, production filmed the 1562 forest scenes in Caerwent Training Area in Monmouthshire. Production returned to Cardiff; interior scenes set at the National Gallery were shot at the National Museum of Wales on 15 April. Filming took place at the Doctor Who Experience the next day, where the Tenth Doctor's TARDIS set was located. The production undertook a location shoot at Chepstow Castle in Monmouthshire on 17 April. The castle remained open to the public and various journalists attended filming.

Billie Piper joined the production at Cardiff on the following day. From 18 April to 1 May, production took place solely at Roath Lock. The dungeon, barn, Black Archive and War Room scenes were shot during this period. Tom Baker's scene was shot on 26 April. The production implemented various measures to prevent his presence from leaking: the set was closed, his character was not listed on the day's call sheet, and he was collected from his East Sussex home at 1.30am so he would not have to stay at a Cardiff hotel overnight. Despite these measures, Baker revealed his casting to The Huffington Post only a few days before the episode's broadcast: "I am in the special. I'm not supposed to tell you that, but I tell you that very willingly and specifically; the BBC told me not to tell anybody but I'm telling you straight away."

The opening shot of the special, set outside Coal Hill School in London, was shot in Cardiff on 2 May. The final two days of principal photography took place across 3 and 4 May at the Mamhilad Park Estate in Pontypool, a derelict factory which was used to depict the ruins of Arcadia. Hurran's main reference for the Arcadia battle sequence was The Terminator (1984). On 3 October, Peter Capaldi shot his cameo as the Twelfth Doctor during production for "The Time of the Doctor".

=== Special and visual effects ===
Producer Marcus Wilson involved special effects artist Mike Tucker and his company The Model Unit early on, off the back of their model work on previous episodes, notably the submarine shots in "Cold War" (2013). The team produced miniature effects for the Time War sequences, including shots of the Time Lord staser cannon and the War Doctor's TARDIS bursting through a wall to destroy Daleks. The Model Unit conducted model tests using the Dalek Emperor model at the Doctor Who Experience. Off-the-shelf 18-inch interactive Dalek toys produced by Character Options were adapted to more closely match the screen-used props. Using Dalek toys as filming models had also been a common technique during Doctor Who's classic era. Model filming took place at Roath Lock across 13 and 14 April 2013, with the miniatures shot in high-speed 3D—a first for British television drama.

Milk VFX produced 129 visual effects shots for the special. These included the Fall of Arcadia, the 3D paintings and the space-time portals. The episode took longer than usual to post-produce, since every visual effect shot had to be created in 3D and thus rendered twice. VFX supervisor Murray Barber noted that "little things that in 2D would take you a day, in stereo they take two and half." The team updated pre-existing CG models of the Daleks, Dalek saucers and Gallifrey Citadel, though the Dalek Pods were newly created for the episode in a design collaboration with the BBC Art Department. The team found creating the 3D paintings conceptually challenging, as the effect needed to work for viewers watching in both 3D and 2D mediums.

Millennium FX developed a Zygon transformation prosthetic, while Jellyfish Pictures created the transformation sequence. BlueBolt provided an alien planet exterior shot. The VFX team at BBC Wales created the hologram effects in the Gallifreyan War Room.

== Continuity references ==
"The Day of the Doctor" opens with the series's original title sequence and logo from 1963.

As Doctor Who's 50th anniversary special, "The Day of the Doctor" contains several references to previous stories. The opening scene recreates imagery from the opening of the series's first episode "An Unearthly Child" (1963); the original title sequence leads into a shot of a policeman walking past an "I.M. Foreman" sign. Clara works at Coal Hill School, a key location in that episode, and the school's sign also references past figures: Ian Chesterton, a companion of the Doctor introduced in "An Unearthly Child", and W. Coburn, a nod to writer Anthony Coburn. Clara departs the school at 5:16pm, the time that "An Unearthly Child" was broadcast.

The Time War was referenced in previous episodes, albeit never outright shown on screen. The Doctor mentioned his presence at the Fall of Arcadia in "Doomsday" (2006). The Moment, originally mentioned in The End of Time (2009–2010), takes the form of "Bad Wolf", an omnipotent being which manifested in Rose Tyler during "The Parting of the Ways" (2005).

An older Queen Elizabeth I is briefly seen ordering the Tenth Doctor's execution in "The Shakespeare Code" (2007), and both The End of Time and "The Beast Below" (2010) alluded to a marriage between the characters. "The Day of the Doctor" retroactively explains these earlier references when the Tenth Doctor accidentally courts, marries and then abandons the Queen.

Fan controversy over when UNIT stories took place is alluded to in Kate Lethbridge Stewart's dialogue when she mentions that the events of The Three Doctors (1972–1973) occurred either in "the '70s or '80s depending on the dating protocol". Stewart asks for a report code-named "Cromer", referencing the events of The Three Doctors, in which the Brigadier mistakes an alternative universe for the coastal Norfolk town.

UNIT's Black Archive, which was introduced in The Sarah Jane Adventures story Enemy of the Bane (2008), contains props from previous episodes, such as River Song's high heels from "The Time of Angels"/"Flesh and Stone" (2010), the Magna-Clamps from "Doomsday", a Supreme Dalek head from "The Stolen Earth"/"Journey's End", a Cyberman head, a Dalek tommy gun from "Daleks in Manhattan"/"Evolution of the Daleks" (2007), Amy Pond's sonic probe from "The Girl Who Waited" (2011), a clockwork robot face mask from "The Girl in the Fireplace" (2006) and Jack Harkness's vortex manipulator. A pinboard with photos of several of the Doctor's companions is seen.

| Dialogue in "The Day of the Doctor" | Callback | Ref. |
|---|---|---|
| "Reverse the polarity" | Third Doctor's catchphrase | |
| "I'm the Doctor. I'm a Time Lord..." | Tenth Doctor in "Voyage of the Damned" (2007) | |
| "Timey-wimey" | Tenth Doctor in "Blink" (2007) | |
| "Oh you've redecorated! I don't like it." | Second Doctor in The Three Doctors (1972–1973); repeated in "The Five Doctors" (1983) and "Closing Time" (2011) | |
| "...wheezing, groaning sound" | Description of TARDIS noise in various novelisations | |
| "Never cruel nor cowardly. Never give up. Never give in." | Terrance Dicks in The Making of Doctor Who (1976): "He never gives in and he never gives up, however overwhelming the odds against him... He is never cruel or cowardly." | |
| "I didn't know when I was well-off. All twelve of them." | Brigadier Lethbridge-Stewart in The Three Doctors | |
| "Wearing a bit thin." | First Doctor in The Tenth Planet (1966) | |
| "It's good to know my future is in safe hands." | First Doctor in "The Five Doctors" | |
| "I don't want to go." | Tenth Doctor in The End of Time (2009–2010) | |

== Marketing ==
=== Minisodes ===
External videos
- "The Night of the Doctor"
- "The Last Day"
- '50 Years' Trailer
- "The Day of the Doctor": The TV Trailer
- "The Day of the Doctor": The Second TV Trailer

Shortly after principal photography ended, two prequel mini-episodes written by Moffat, both focusing on the Time War, were recorded at Roath Lock Studios. "The Night of the Doctor", released online on 14 November, saw Paul McGann reprise the role of the Eighth Doctor on screen for the first time since his debut in Doctor Who (1996). In the minisode, the Eighth Doctor is temporarily resurrected by the Sisterhood of Karn in the aftermath of a spaceship crash, and persuaded to regenerate into a warrior-like incarnation (the War Doctor) to take action to end the Time War. "The Last Day", released on 20 November, depicts found footage of a Gallifreyan soldier killed by a Dalek in the Fall of Arcadia. Chris Finch reprised his role from "The Day of the Doctor" as a Time Lord soldier.

=== Trailers ===
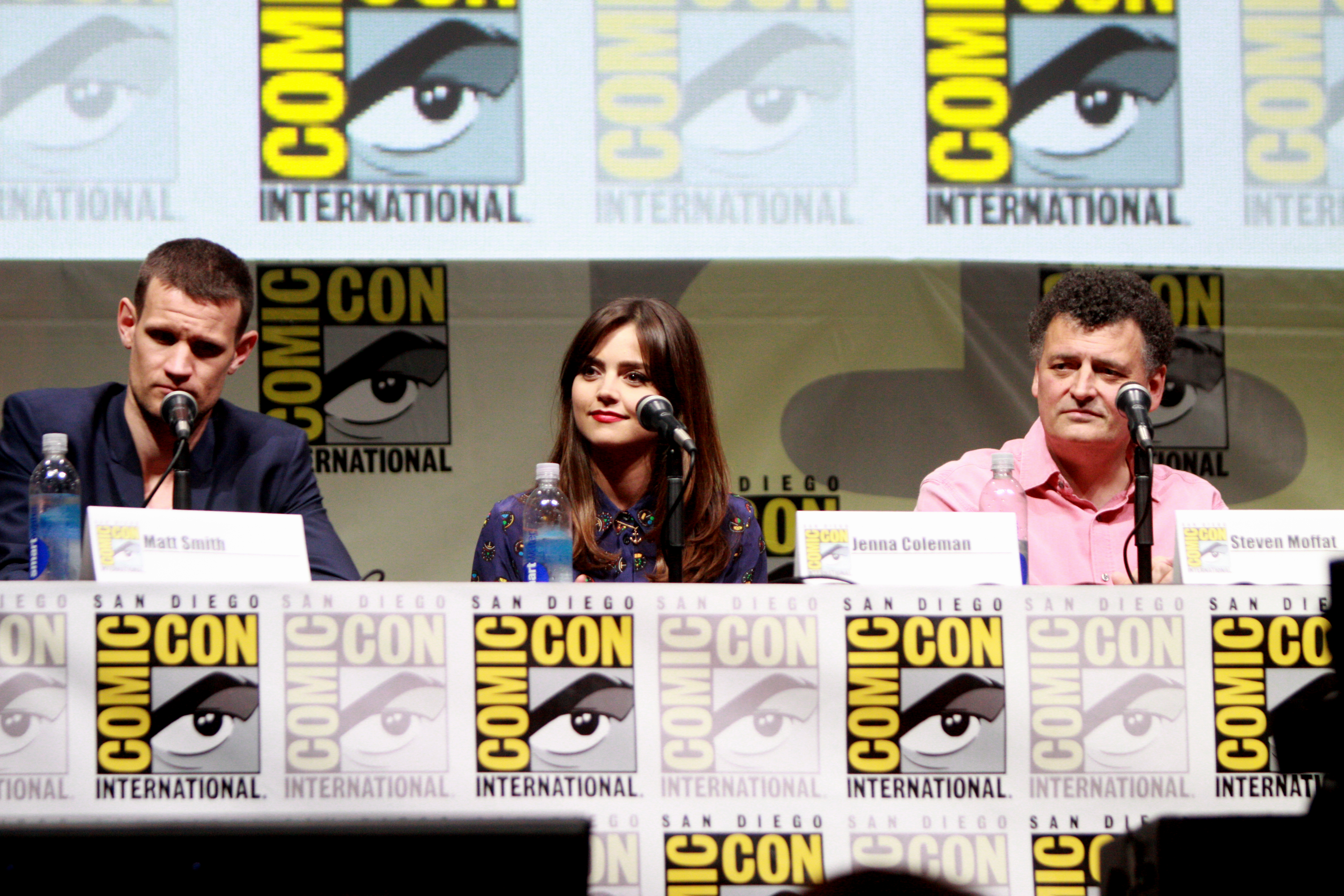
Matt Smith, Jenna Coleman and Steven Moffat at the 2013 San Diego Comic-Con, where the first trailer was publicly screened

The first trailer for the special was shown to attendees of San Diego Comic-Con in July 2013. The BBC's decision not to immediately release the trailer online for viewing by UK audiences was met with controversy. On 26 July, the BBC responded to criticisms by stating the trailer was intended to be exclusive to Comic-Con attendees and that UK-exclusive content would be forthcoming. The special's title was revealed on 10 September.

Red Bee Media produced a promotional "50 Years" trailer, directed by Matt Losasso and produced by Carrie Hart, which emphasised the episode's 3D nature. The trailer features no footage from "The Day of the Doctor", instead moving through a series of frozen scenes showcasing characters and props from Doctor Who's 50-year history. Principal photography took place at Stage 1 of Black Island Studios, London, from 15 to 16 August 2013, with stand-ins portraying key characters, over whom the original actors' features were placed. Footage of Smith and Coleman was captured on 2 September in London, while Smith's narration was recorded on 5 October during recording of "The Time of the Doctor". The appearance of William Hartnell, based on a black-and-white still from The Web Planet (1965), marks the first time an image of the actor has been presented in high-resolution colour. Framestore visual effects supervisor Oliver Bersey used the software Flame to recreate the camera's movement and add various frozen props.

The "50 Years" trailer features the first image of William Hartnell presented in high-resolution colour.

The BBC teased the "50 Years" trailer on 28 September before formally announcing it on 19 October alongside a promotional image of all eleven Doctors. The trailer aired on BBC One later that day and was subsequently released on YouTube, where it received almost one million views within two days. The Verge's Ellis Hamburger called it "essential viewing for any Doctor Who fan", and Radio Times felt it "was the sort of thing that could only have been made for a fanbase as fervent as Doctor Who's". The trailer ended with the promotional hashtag #SaveTheDay, which subsequently trended on Twitter. A one-minute "Original British Drama trailer" aired on BBC One on 19 October. On 7 November, a video starring Smith in character as the Eleventh Doctor was released promoting the hashtag and promising exclusive content. A website, doctorwhosavetheday.com, was also launched.

On Friday 8 November, a Facebook page for BBC Latin America leaked a Spanish-dubbed clip from the episode. A 40-second trailer was released on 9 November. An 80-second trailer was released on 10 November. On 10 and 11 November, certain BBC One idents were "interrupted" by short clips of Smith in character as the Eleventh Doctor. A clip from the episode was shown during the BBC's Children in Need telethon on Friday 15 November. On 20 November, an exclusive clip of the War Doctor meeting the Moment was shown on The One Show. On 22 November, The Graham Norton Show aired an exclusive clip of the Tenth and Eleventh Doctors arguing in the dungeon. A further 30 seconds' worth of clips were also released by the BBC on the same date.

"The Day of the Doctor" was not screened for the press prior to transmission. Moffat stated "If you're going to do a simulcast, everyone should see it at once, rather than the press getting to see it a few days in advance... This one is for the fans. They see it first."

=== Convention ===
The Doctor Who 50th Anniversary Celebration Weekend was held at ExCeL London from 22–24 November. Various Doctor Who cast and crew, both past and contemporary, were in attendance to promote "The Day of the Doctor".

== Broadcast and reception ==
Countries that screened "The Day of the Doctor" simultaneously. Countries that screened on TV. Countries that screened in cinemas. Countries that screened both on TV and in cinemas.

=== Television ===
In order to avoid plot leaks, "The Day of the Doctor" was simultaneously broadcast in 94 countries at 7:50pm GMT on 23 November 2013; 50 years to the day since the broadcast of "An Unearthly Child". In the UK, the special was broadcast on BBC One, with a 3D simulcast available via the BBC HD Red Button service.

Foreign broadcasters included Yle (Finland), Fox (Germany), Carousel (Russia), NKS (Russia), ABC (Australia), Space (Canada), BBC America (United States) and BBC Entertainment (Poland). The latter broadcaster also aired the episode in Latin America, Africa and Asia. "The Day of the Doctor" achieved the Guinness World Record for "the world's largest ever simulcast of a TV drama". (Note: This record was broken by the simulcast of "Kitty" (2014), an episode of the American television series CSI: Crime Scene Investigation, to 171 countries on 4 March 2015.)

The broadcast was followed by the live programme Doctor Who Live: The Afterparty on BBC3, which was criticised in the media for ignoring former Doctor Who cast members brought onto the programme, as well as for incongruously including a live cross with members of One Direction. The comedy short film The Five(ish) Doctors Reboot (2013), directed by Peter Davison, was also released on the BBC Red Button service. The film follows fictionalised versions of Davison, Colin Baker and Sylvester McCoy as they attempt to sneak onto the set of "The Day of the Doctor".

=== Cinemas ===
"The Day of the Doctor" screened in 1,559 cinemas internationally. 834 cinemas screened the episode in 3D. In the UK and Ireland, the episode was released in Cineworld, Vue, Odeon and Picturehouse cinemas. It screened in 106 cinemas across Australia and New Zealand. 30 German cinemas and up to 50 Russian theatres debuted the episode. It was screened in Cinemark 3D theatres in Mexico, Brazil, Chile, Colombia, Ecuador, Panama and Peru. It also screened in Denmark via the CinemaxX chain. It aired in Cineplex cinemas in Canada. It screened in 660 cinemas in the United States via AMC, Cinemark and Regal.

Cinema screenings included an introductory sketch featuring Dan Starkey as Sontaran commander Strax and Hurt, Tennant and Smith as the Doctors.

=== Critical reception ===
Professional ratings
Aggregate scores
| Source | Rating |
|---|---|
| Rotten Tomatoes (Average Score) | 9.41 |
| Rotten Tomatoes (Tomatometer) | 100% |
Review scores
| Source | Rating |
| IGN | 9.3 |
| New York Magazine | 5/5 stars |
| PopMatters | 7/10 stars |
| Radio Times | 5/5 stars |
| The A.V. Club | A− |
| The Daily Telegraph | 5/5 stars |
| TV Fanatic | 5/5 stars |

"The Day of the Doctor" received critical acclaim. On Rotten Tomatoes, the special has 100% approval rating based on 18 reviews, and an average rating of 9.41/10. The website's critical consensus reads, "Doctor Who: The Day of the Doctor is a joyous marker in the series, uniting two of the most beloved Time Lords and setting them together on a rousing adventure full of crowd-pleasing nods and winks." Ben Lawrence of The Daily Telegraph gave the special five stars, calling it "charming, eccentric and very, very British."

Dan Martin of The Guardian praised the episode, stating that it "couldn't possibly live up to expectations. And it didn't – it exceeded them." He commended Hurt's performance and acknowledged that "a multi-Doctor story was a necessary but dangerous move". Chris Taylor of Mashable noted the episode is "one designed to please fans and newcomers alike," and that it "shows why the Doctor is finding his way into ever more homes and hearts."

Simon Brew of Den of Geek praised the special, calling it "terrific", and stating that it was "pulsating with comedy, ambition, and top to bottom entertainment." However, he commented negatively on the conclusion of the Zygon subplot, stating it "just fizzled out a little, after a strong build up", and felt that the retcon of the Doctor saving Gallifrey felt "like years of darkness was sort-of sorted out in 20 minutes (albeit with no little gravitas)". Alasdair Wilkins of The A.V. Club praised Hurt and noted that the episode is "the story of all the different kinds of person that the Doctor can be, and what they mean to the universe, not to mention to each other." He also questioned whether Gallifrey's resurrection undermined past episodes. Patrick Mulkern of the Radio Times stated the episode was "brilliant, if uneven in pace" and lauded Hurt's casting, though admitted that Eccleston's return would have worked better.

=== Ratings ===
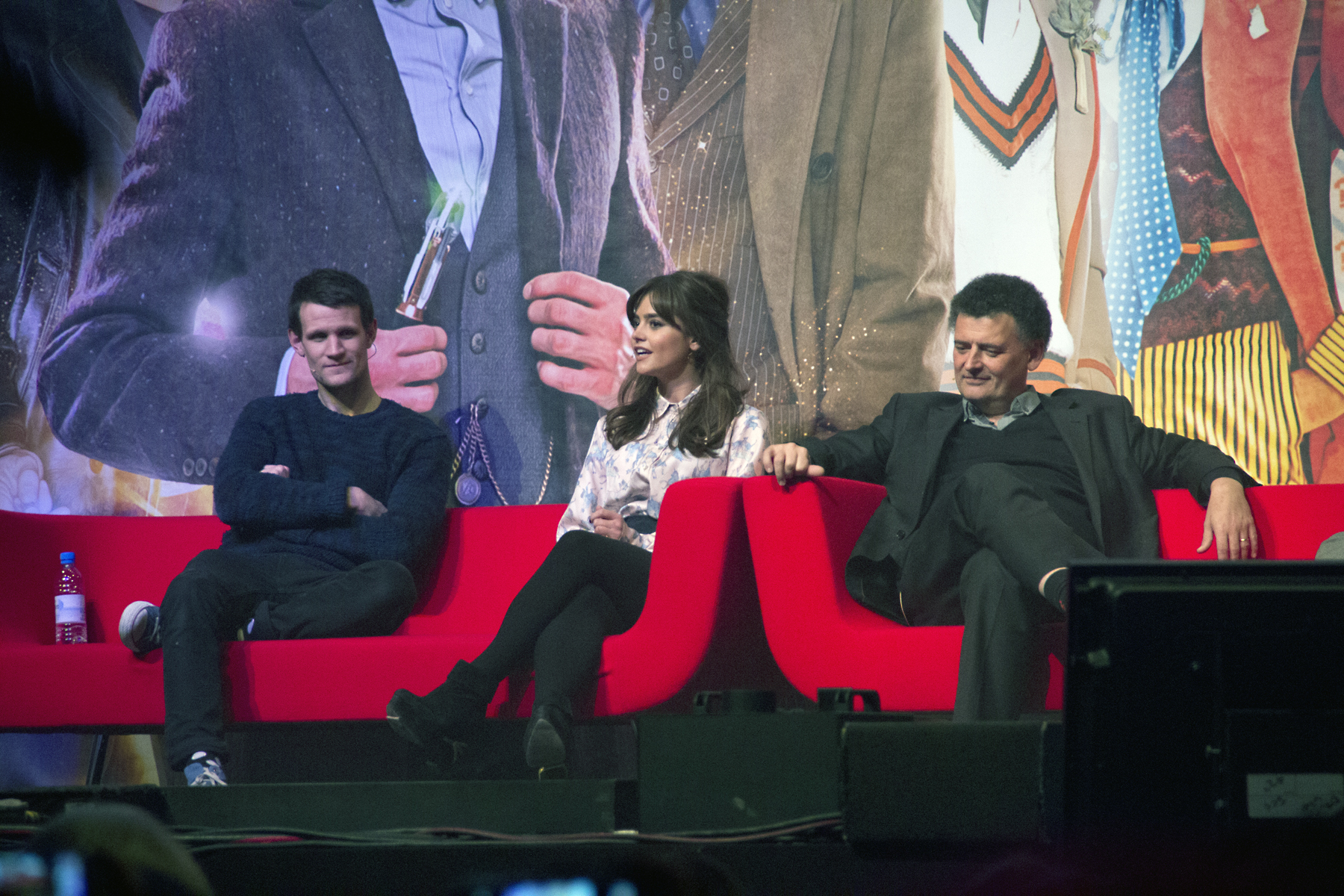
4,000 attendees watched "The Day of the Doctor" live at the official Doctor Who 50th Anniversary Celebration Weekend, which was held at ExCeL London from 22–24 November.

Overnight figures revealed that the episode was watched by 10.61 million live viewers in the United Kingdom, averaging 10.2 million viewers across its running time. When time-shifted viewers were taken into account, the figure rose to a total of 12.8 million viewers. "The Day of the Doctor" was the most requested programme ever on BBC iPlayer in 24 hours, with 1.27 million requests, which rose to 2.9 million by 3 December 2013. It was named the most-watched drama of 2013 based on consolidated viewing figures.

Its live simulcast on BBC America had a total audience of 2.4 million viewers, briefly becoming the largest audience in the channel's history until the broadcast of "The Time of the Doctor". Despite its 6.50am AEST start time, 424,000 Australian viewers (five city metro audience, all people) watched the live simulcast on ABC1. Another 922,000 watched the repeat at 7:30pm. The episode received an additional 51,000 plays on ABC iview in a single day. 134,400 New Zealand viewers watched the episode on Prime, which was its most-watched show for the day.

Worldwide, cinema screenings brought in USD10.2 million at the box office. "The Day of the Doctor" was the third biggest UK box office draw for its weekend, taking in £1.8 million at 440 cinemas. It made US$4.8 million in the United States, where it was ranked the number two movie of 25 November 2013. The special placed third that weekend at the Australian box office, making AU$1.5 million, and second at the New Zealand box office, making NZ$187,000. 4,000 attendees watched "The Day of the Doctor" live at ExCeL London.

The simulcast generated 442,692 tweets on Twitter, peaking at 12,939 tweets per minute during the episode's opening moments.

=== Awards and nominations ===
| Award | Date of ceremony | Category | Result | Ref. |
|---|---|---|---|---|
| British Academy Television Craft Awards | 27 April 2014 | Special, Visual And Graphic Effects | Won | |
| Nebula Awards | 17 May 2014 | Ray Bradbury Nebula Award for Outstanding Dramatic Presentation | Nominated | |
| British Academy Television Awards | 18 May 2014 | Audience Award | Won | |
| Hugo Awards | 17 August 2014 | Best Dramatic Presentation, Short Form | Nominated | |
| BAFTA Cymru Awards | 26 October 2014 | Special, Visual Effects and Graphics | Won | |

In a 2014 poll conducted by Doctor Who Magazine, "The Day of the Doctor" was voted the most popular televised Doctor Who story of the series's first 50 years.

== Home media ==
"The Day of the Doctor" was released on DVD and Blu-ray on 2 December 2013; the latter edition included the episode in 3D. The special was re-released on DVD and Blu-ray in September 2014 as part of the "50th Anniversary Collector's Edition" alongside "The Name of the Doctor", "The Night of the Doctor", "The Time of the Doctor", An Adventure in Space and Time and The Five(ish) Doctors Reboot. In November 2020, a limited edition Blu-ray steelbook was announced.

=== Soundtrack ===
Orchestral music recording for "The Day of the Doctor" took place on 20 September with the BBC National Orchestra of Wales at Hoddinott Hall, Cardiff; 54 minutes of music were recorded. In November 2014, Silva Screen Records released a two-CD soundtrack album for "The Day of the Doctor" and "The Time of the Doctor".

=== In print ===
The Day of the Doctor
- Author: Steven Moffat
- Cover artist: Anthony Dry
- Series: Doctor Who book: Target novelisations
- Publisher: BBC Books
- Publication date: 5 April 2018
- Pages: 232
- ISBN: 978-1-785-94329-4

A novelisation written by Steven Moffat was released in paperback and digital formats in April 2018 as part of the Target Collection.
