= Milk VFX =

British visual effects studio

- Industry: Motion Picture, Film, TV, Animation, Visual Effects
- Founded: 4 June 2013
- Headquarters: London, England,, United Kingdom
- Number of locations: 4
- Key people: Bejoy Arputharaj - Director; Marianne Speight - CBDO/Exec Producer; Sara Bennett - CCO/VFX Supervisor; Jean-Claude Deguara - VFX Exec Supervisor
- Website: www.milk-vfx.com/

Milk VFX is a British independent visual effects studio. It was founded in London in 2013 and is known for creating complex and innovative sequences for high-end television and feature films.

The company received an Academy Award for Sara Bennett’s work on Ex Machina, three BAFTA Television Craft Awards for Doctor Who 50th Anniversary Episode: The Day of The Doctor, Doctor Who Series 8 Episode 1: Deep Breath and Jonathan Strange & Mr Norrell Episode 5: Arabella. In addition, Milk has won a Creative Arts Emmy Awards for Sherlock Special Episode: The Abominable Bride.

Headquartered in Clerkenwell, London, Milk has expanded into Bordeaux, Dublin and Barcelona and acquired independent, BAFTA award-winning VFX studio Lola Post Production. Milk’s parent company Bizet Media has acquired Dublin-based High Wire post-production to provide broader VFX and production solutions.

== History ==
Milk was founded by a small group of talented VFX artists and producers in 2013 and moved into a new office in Clerkenwell at the start of 2022.

In October 2022 Milk acquired BAFTA Award winning VFX Studio Lola Post Production.

=== European Expansion ===
In December 2022 Milk announced the launch of a new studio in Bordeaux, France. Milk VFX Supervisor Andy Morley leads the studio and creative team as head of studio and creative director.

In March 2023 Milk announced the soft launch of a studio in Dublin, Ireland. Overseeing the creative launch of the studio are Milk VFX Supervisors Ciaran Crowley and Donal Nolan.

In July 2023 Milk announced its presence in El Poblenou, Barcelona, Spain. This follows a long relationship between Milk and the talent in Spain; leading the creative team is Milk 2D Supervisor Jorge Oliva Ruiz de Leon.

== Filmography ==
=== Feature films ===
==== 2013-2024 ====
Year	Title	Director(s)	Distributor(s)	Notes
2013	47 Ronin	Carl Rinsch	H2F Entertainment, Mid Atlantic Films, Moving Picture Company, DMG Entertainment, Warrior Productions, Stuber Productions, Relativity Media, Universal Pictures	
2014	Hercules	Brett Ratner	Paramount Pictures, Metro-Goldwyn-Mayer Pictures, Flynn Picture Company, Radical Studios, Film 44, RatPac Entertainment, Mid Atlantic Films	
2014	Dracula: Untold	Gary Shore	Legendary Entertainment, Michael De Luca Productions, Universal Pictures	
2014	Get Santa	Christopher Smith	Scott Free Films, BFI, Screen Yorkshire, Ingenious, Warner Bros. Pictures	
2014	Ex Machina	Alex Garland	Film4, DNA Films, A24, Universal Pictures International	
2015	The Divergent Series: Insurgent	Robert Schwentke	Red Wagon Entertainment, Summit Entertainment, Mandeville Films, Lionsgate	
2015	Poltergeist	Gil Kenan	Fox 2000 Pictures, Metro-Goldwyn-Mayer Pictures, Ghost House Pictures, Vertigo Entertainment, 20th Century Fox	
2015	Everest	Baltasar Kormakur	Cross Creek Pictures, Walden Media, RVK Studios, Working Title Films, Universal Pictures	
2015	High Rise	Ben Wheatley	Recorded Picture Company, HanWay Films, Film4, BFI, Northern Ireland Screen, Ingenious Media, Scope Pictures, S Films, StudioCanal	
2015	The Martian	Ridley Scott	Scott Free Productions, Kinberg Genre, 20th Century Fox	
2016	Free Fire	Ben Wheatley	Film4 Productions, BFI, Rook Films, Protagonist Pictures, StudioCanal	
2016	Fantastic Beasts and Where to Find Them	David Yates	Warner Bros. Pictures, Heyday Films	
2017	Kingsman: The Golden Circle	Matthew Vaughn	Marv Films, Cloudy Productions, 20th Century Fox	
2017	The Escape (short)	Paul J. Franklin	Pari Passu Films	
2018	Annihilation	Alex Garland	Skydance, DNA Films, Scott Rudin Productions, Huahua Media, Paramount Pictures (North America and China), Netflix (International)	
2018	Adrift	Baltasar Kormakur	STXfilms, Lakeshore Entertainment, H. Brothers, Ingenious Media, RVK Studios, STX Entertainment	
2018	Who Will Write Our History	Roberta Grossman	Katahdin Productions, Match Spark, Polski Instytut Sztuki Filmowej, Maziowiecki Fundusz Filmowy, EC1 Lódz - Miasto Kultury, NDR/Arte, Next Film (Poland), Abramorama (United States), Giant Pictures (International), Midas Filmes (Portugal)	
2018	Fantastic Beasts: Crimes of Gindelwald	David Yates	Warner Bros. Pictures, Heyday Films	
2020	Possessor	Brandon Cronenberg	Ingenious Media, Telefilm Canada, Arclight Films, Ontario Creates, Particular Crowd, Crave, Rhombus Media, Rook Films, Elevation Pictures, Signature Entertainment	
2020	Four Kids And It	Andy De Emmony	Kindle Entertainment, Deadpan Pictures, Sky Cinema, Altitude Film Distribution	
2020	The Old Guard	Gina Prince-Bythewood	Skydance, Denver and Delilah Productions, Marc Evans Productions, Netflix	
2020	Rebecca	Ben Wheatley	Working Title Films, Big Talk Productions, Netflix	
2021	In The Earth	Ben Wheatley	Rook Films, Protagonist Pictures, Neon (United States), Universal Pictures, Focus Features	
2021	Everybody's Talking About Jamie	Jonathan Butterell	Regency Enterprises, Film4 Productions, Warp Films, New Regency, Amazon Studios	
2021	The Last Letter From Your Lover	Augustine Frizzell	Blueprint Pictures, The Film Farm, Canal+, Ciné+, StudioCanal	
2021	Earwig	Lucile Hadzihalilovic	Petit Film, BFI Fund, Anti-Worlds, Frakas Productions, Film4, New Story (France), Anti-Worlds (United Kingdom), Juno Films (United States), Mubi	
2022	Me Time	John Hamburg	Particular Pictures, HartBeat Productions, Netflix	
2022	The Swimmers	Sally El Hosaini	Working Title Films, Netflix	
2022	The Woman King	Gina Prince-Bythewood	TriStar Pictures, Entertainment One, JuVee Productions, Welle Entertainment, Sony Pictures Releasing	
2022	What's Love got to do With It?	Shekhar Kapur	Working Title Films, Instinct Productions, StudioCanal	
2022	I Used to Be Famous	Eddie Sternberg	Forty Foot Pictures, Filmkowski, Netflix	
2022	Catherine Called Birdy	Lena Dunham	Working Title Films, Good Thing Going, Amazon Studios	
2022	Your Christmas or Mine?	Jim O’Hanlon	Shiny Buttons Productions, Amazon Prime	
2023	Kandahar	Ric Roman Waugh	Thunder Road Films, G-BASE, MBC Studios, Capstone Global, Open Road Films	
2023	Meg 2: The Trench	Ben Wheatley	CMC Pictures, DF Pictures di Bonaventura Pictures, Apelles Entertainment, Warner Bros. Pictures	
2023	Genie	Sam Boyd	Universal Pictures, Peacock Productions, Working Title Films, Linden Productions, Universal Pictures International	

=== Television ===
==== 2013-2024 ====
Year	Title	Distributor(s)
2013	Ice Age Giants	BBC Studios, Discovery Channel, Terra Mater Factual Studios, France Télévisions
2013-2017	Doctor Who	BBC Wales
2014	David Attenborough's Natural History Museum Alive 3D	Sky One
2014	24: Live Another Day	Imagine Television, Real Time Productions, Teakwood Lane Productions, 20th Century Fox Television
2014-2017	Sherlock	Hartswood Films, BBC Wales, WGBH
2015	Thunderbirds: Are Go	ITV Studios, Pukeko Pictures, Weta Workshop
2015	Jonathan Strange & Mr Norrell	Cuba Pictures, Feel Films, BBC America, Screen Yorkshire, Space, Far Moor
2015	Lady Chatterley’s Lover	BBC Studios
2015	The Bastard Executioner	Sutter Ink, Imagine Television, FX Productions, Fox 21 Television Studios
2015	Harry Price: Ghost Hunter	Bentley Productions, ITV 1, Dazzler Media
2016	Class	BBC Studios, BBC Cymru Wales, BBC America, BBC Worldwide
2016	The Last Dragonslayer	Blueprint Pictures, Pixoloid Studios, OCS Max (France), 9Go!, Sony Pictures Television International
2016	My Mother and Other Strangers	BBC Northern Ireland
2017	The Worst Witch	CBBC Productions ZDF
2017	Decline and Fall	Cave Bear Productions, Tiger Aspect Productions, BBC
2017	Electric Dreams	Anonymous Content, Channel 4, Amazon Studios, Electric Shepherd Productions, Moon Shot Entertainment, Left Bank Pictures, Rooney McP Productions, Tall Ship Productions
2018	The Alienist	Paramount Television, Studio T, Anonymous Content, Vanessa Productions Ltd., TNT
2018	Altered Carbon	Virago Productions, Mythology Entertainment, Phoenix Pictures, Skydance Television, Netflix
2018	Origin	CiTVC, Midnight Radio, Sony Pictures Television, Left Bank Pictures, YouTube Premium
2019	The Accident	The Forge, Channel 4, Hulu
2019-2023	Good Omens	Narrativia, Amazon Studios, BBC Studios, The Blank Corporation, Amazon Prime Video, BBC Two
2020	Dracula	Hartswood Films, BBC One, Netflix
2020	Cursed	Arcanum, Frank Miller Ink, Netflix
2021	Intergalactic	Motion Content Group, Moonage Pictures, Tiger Aspect Productions, Sky One
2021	Fate: The Winx Saga	Archery Pictures, Young Blood Productions, Rainbow S.p.A., ViacomCBS, Netflix
2022	Suspicion	Keshet UK, Apple TV+
2022	The Fear Index	FILLSCRN, Left Bank Pictures, Vidoeassist.hu, Sky
2022	Three Pines	Amazon Studios, Left Bank Pictures
2023	Citadel	Gozie AGBO, Midnight Radio, PKM, Picrow, Amazon Studios
2023	Bodies	Moonage Pictures, Netflix

=== Other ===
Video Games

- Mass Effect 3 - Teaser Trailer (2012)

VR Experiences

- Tree (2017)

Experiences

- Dinosaurs in the Wild (2017)

=== Awards ===
==== 2013-2024 ====
Year	Award	Category	Work	Result
2014	BAFTA - Craft Awards	Special, Visual & Graphic Effects	Doctor Who 50th Anniversary Episode: The Day of The Doctor	Won
2014	BAFTA - Craft Awards	Special, Visual & Graphic Effects	David Attenborough's Natural History Museum Alive 3D	Nominated
2015	BAFTA - Craft Awards	Special, Visual & Graphic Effects	Doctor Who Series 8 Episode 1: Deep Breath	Won
2015	Royal Television Society	Effects - Digital	Jonathan Strange & Mr Norrell	Nominated
2016	Academy Awards	Best Visual Effects	Ex Machina	Won
2016	Creative Arts Emmy Awards	Outstanding Supporting Special and Visual Effects in a Supporting Role	Sherlock Special Episode: The Abominable Bride	Won
2016	BAFTA	Best Special Visual Effects	Ex Machina	Nominated
2016	Visual Effects Society Awards	Outstanding Visual Effects in a Photoreal Episode	Jonathan Strange & Mr Norrell: Arabella	Nominated
2016	Royal Television Society Craft & Design Awards	Effects - Digital	Beowulf: Return to the Shieldlands	Nominated
2016	BAFTA - Craft Awards	Special, Visual & Graphic Effects	Jonathan Strange & Mr Norrell Episode 5	Won
2016	BAFTA - Craft Awards	Special, Visual & Graphic Effects	Doctor Who Series 9	Nominated
2017	BAFTA - Craft Awards	Special, Visual & Graphic Effects	The Last Dragonslayer	Nominated
2017	BAFTA - Craft Awards	Special, Visual & Graphic Effects	Sherlock Special Episode: The Abominable Bride	Nominated
2019	Broadcast Tech Innovation Awards	Best VFX Project	Good Omens	Nominated
2020	BAFTA - Craft Awards	Special, Visual & Graphic Effects	Good Omens	Nominated
2020	Broadcast Tech Innovation Award	Best VFX Project	Cursed	Nominated
2021	British Academy Television Craft Awards	Special, Visual & Graphic Effects	Cursed	Nominated
2021	Broadcast Tech Innovation Awards	Best VFX Project	Intergalactic	Nominated
2022	British Academy Television Craft Awards	Special, Visual & Graphic Effects	Intergalactic	Nominated
2014	UK Screen Alliance	Outstanding Contribution to VFX	Jean-Claude Deguara – VFX Supervisor + Sara Bennett – CCO/VFX Supervisor Milk VFX	Nominated
