= Tom Wheeler (writer) =

American screenwriter and producer

- Born: United States
- Occupations: screenwriter producer
- Years active: 2002–present

Tom Wheeler is an American screenwriter and producer. He served as the executive producer and show runner for the NBC superhero series The Cape.

== Career ==
=== Television work ===
Wheeler began his television career writing and executive producing the ABC mini-series Empire in 2005. He then wrote two television pilots, The World According to Barnes and Captain Cook's Extraordinary Atlas, neither of which were taken to series. His series The Cape, about a police officer framed for a crime he did not commit who takes on the guise of his son's favorite comic book hero in order to clear his name, premiered on NBC on January 9, 2011.

=== Film work ===
Wheeler co-wrote the screenplay for Puss in Boots (2011), a spin-off from the Shrek franchise about the eponymous character.

He wrote the screenplay for the 2015 DreamWorks Animation's animated film B.O.O.: Bureau of Otherworldly Operations, but that film was quietly canceled. He was also co-writing another DreamWorks animated film Trollhunters together with the film's co-director Guillermo del Toro, but the movie was then converted into a television series instead. Wheeler also wrote the 2017 live-action/animated film, The Lego Ninjago Movie.

=== Other writing ===
On March 22, 2018, it was announced that Wheeler was working with Frank Miller on the illustrated young adult novel Cursed, a reimagining of the King Arthur legend from the point of view of the Lady of the Lake. The book was written by Wheeler, while Miller provided full-color and black-and-white illustrations. Six days later it was announced that Miller and Wheeler will also simultaneously adapt the book into a TV series of the same name, which had already received a 10-episode order from Netflix. Both Wheeler and Miller served as executive producers and Wheeler also served as showrunner and writer. The book was published by Simon & Schuster in the fall of 2019 and the TV series' first season was released on Netflix on July 17, 2020. On July 9, 2021, Netflix canceled the series after one season.

== Filmography ==
=== Film ===
Year	Title	Writer	Producer	Notes
2002	Imagination	No	Yes	Short movie, executive producer
2003	Tir Nan Og	No	Yes	Short movie, executive producer
2007	The World According to Barnes	Yes	Yes	TV movie, executive producer
2009	Captain Cook's Extraordinary Atlas	Yes	No	TV movie
2011	Puss in Boots	Yes	No	
2017	The Lego Ninjago Movie	Yes	No	
2019	Dora and the Lost City of Gold	Story	No	
2022	Puss in Boots: The Last Wish	Story	No	

=== Television ===
Year	Title	Writer	Producer	Notes
2005	Empire	Yes	Yes	Mini-series, executive producer
2005-06	Surface	Yes	Yes	written 1 episode, consulting producer
2011	The Cape	Yes	Yes	creator, written 4 episodes, executive producer
2020	Cursed	Yes	Yes	creator, written 4 episodes, executive producer

== Bibliography ==
=== Graphic novels ===
- Cursed (2019), writer, with art by Frank Miller
