= Xavier Lemaître =

French actor

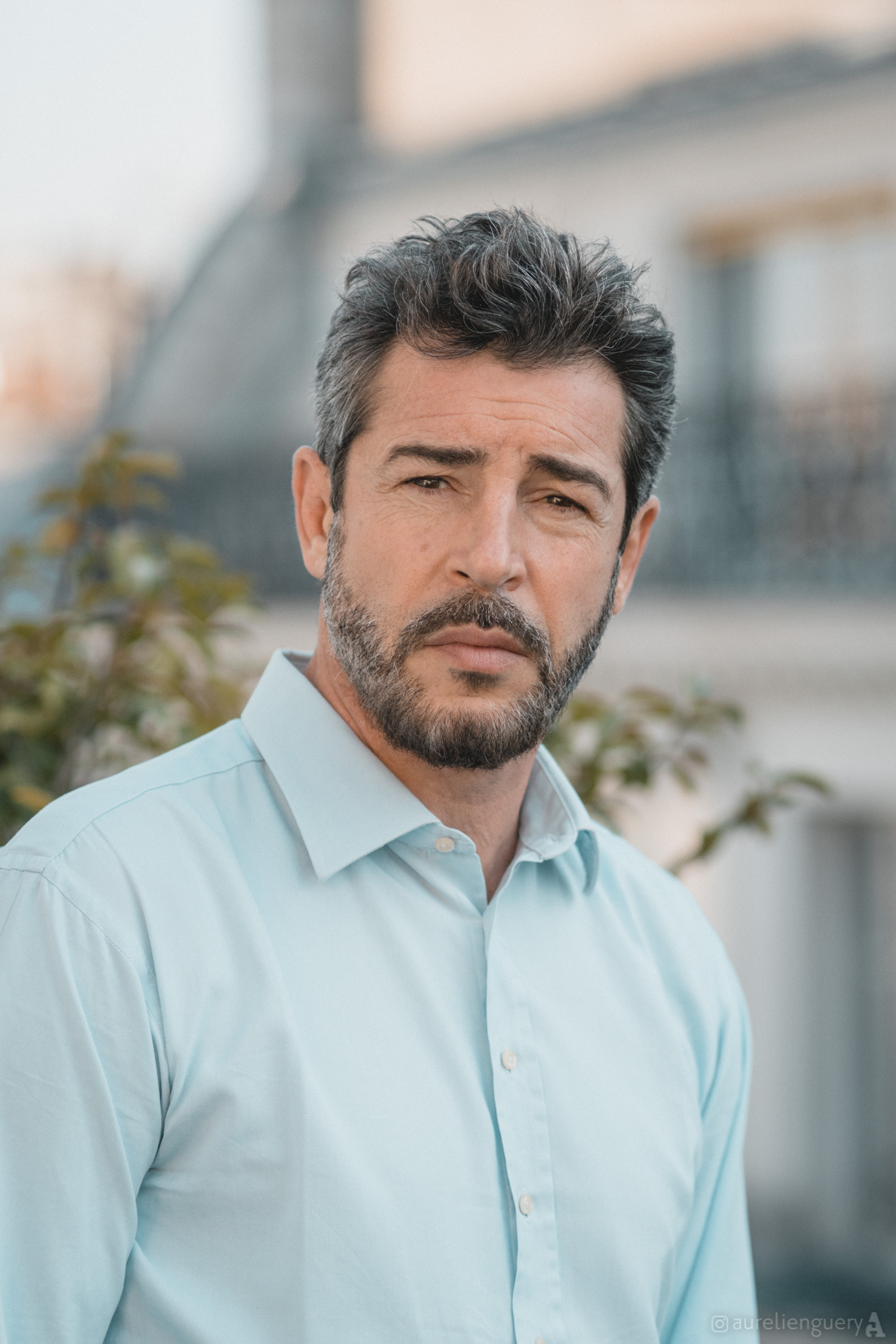
- Occupation: Actor
- Years active: 2008–present

Xavier Lemaître is a French actor.

== Career ==
Lemaître obtained a degree from KEDGE Business School and began the Cartier's director and met Jean-Claude Brialy who thought that he should play on stage. In 2005, he decided to study acting.

In 2008 he started to work with Richard Berry, Jean Reno and Omar Sy.

He lives with the Romanian model Diana Dondoe.

== Filmography ==
=== Film ===
- 2010 : 22 Bullets de Richard Berry
- 2012 : Il était une fois, une fois
- 2012 : On the Other Side of the Tracks
- 2013 : It Boy
- 2013 : Me, Myself and Mum
- 2014 : 3 Days to Kill
- 2015 : The Squad
- 2015 : Alaska
- 2017 : Marie-Francine

=== Television ===
- 2008 : Section de recherches
- 2008 : Pas de secrets entre nous
- 2009 : SoeurThérèse.com
- 2009 : Chante !
- 2010 : Spiral, season 3
- 2011 : Les Beaux Mecs
- 2012 : Toussaint Louverture
- 2013 : R.I.S, police scientifique
- 2013 : Ce monde est fou
- 2013 : Sous le soleil de Saint-Tropez
- 2013 : La Rupture
- 2014 : Falco
- 2014 : La vallée des mensonges
- 2014 : Camping paradis
- 2015 : Mr Selfridge, season 3
- 2015 : Le juge est une femme
- 2016 : Lanester
- 2016 : Meurtres à Dunkerque
- 2016 : Mongeville
- 2018 : Un adultère
- 2018 : Crimes parfaits
- 2018 : Commissaire Magellan
- 2021 : Lupin
- 2026 : Missed Call

== Theatre ==
- 2006 : Le Bourgeois gentilhomme by Molière
- 2006 : A Midsummer Night's Dream by Shakespeare
- 2007 : Andromaque by Racine
- 2007 : Aux larmes citoyens by Raymond Acquaviva
- 2008 : Tartuffe by Molière
- 2008 : Danton's Death by Georg Büchner
- 2009 : La Sœur du Grec by Eric Delcourt
- 2010 -2011 : Hors piste by Eric Delcourt

== Award ==
- Festival des créations télévisuelles de Luchon 2018 : Best actor in Un adultère.
