= Bad Tidings =

2024 British comedy television film

- Promotional poster
- Screenplay by: Laurence Rickard; Martha Howe-Douglas; Chris McCausland
- Directed by: Tim Kirkby
- Starring: Chris McCausland; Lee Mack; Rebekah Staton; Sarah Alexander
- Music by: Paul Hartnoll
- Country of origin: United Kingdom
- Original language: English

Production
- Producers: Adnan Ahmed; Anil Gupta
- Cinematography: Andy Hollis
- Editor: Nick Arthurs
- Running time: 80 minutes
- Production company: Sky Studios

Original release
- Network: Sky Max
- Release: 22 December 2024

Bad Tidings is a British Christmas television film written by Laurence Rickard, Martha Howe-Douglas and Chris McCausland, and starring McCausland, Lee Mack, Sarah Alexander and Rebekah Staton.

== Synopsis ==
Two warring neighbours find they have to work together at Christmas to solve a neighbourhood crime.

== Cast ==
- Chris McCausland as Scott
- Lee Mack as Neil
- Rebekah Staton as Stacey Brennan
- Sarah Alexander as Laura
- Ben Crompton as 'Big' Barry Brennan
- Emily Coates as Ashleigh Brennan
- Josiah Eloi as 'Little' Barry Brennan
- Millie Kiss as Chloe
- Tupele Dorgu as Sabrina
- Rich Keeble as Euan
- Sunil Patel as Raj
- Donna Preston as Sue
- Maggie Ollerenshaw as April

== Production ==
The film is written by Laurence Rickard, Martha Howe-Douglas and Chris McCausland, who also had a starring role. It is directed by Tim Kirkby. Producers are Adnan Ahmed and Anil Gupta for Sky Studios.

The cast also includes Lee Mack, Sarah Alexander and Rebekah Staton.

Principal photography began in April 2024. Filming took place on a housing estate in Stapleford Abbots, Essex, with additional filming taking place at Sky Elstree Film Studios in Hertfordshire and Romford, Greater London. This production was filmed over three to four weeks, with much shot at night.

== Broadcast ==
A trailer was released on 20 November 2024. The film was broadcast on Sky Max and streaming service NOW on 22 December 2024.
