= Matthew Thomas =

Matthew or Matt Thomas may refer to:

- Matt Thomas (soccer) (born 1995), American soccer player
- Matt Thomas (basketball) (born 1994), American basketball player
- Matt Thomas (guitarist) (born 1986), American guitar player
- Matt Thomas (ice hockey) (born 1975), Canadian ice hockey coach
- Matthew Thomas (linebacker) (born 1995), American football player
- Matt Thomas (rugby league) (born 1976), Welsh rugby league international
- Matt Thomas (Australian rules footballer) (born 1987)
- Matthew Thomas (musician) (born 1973), New Zealand rock bassist
- Matthew James Thomas (born 1988), British actor
- Matthew K. Thomas (born 1948), Indian Pentecostal
- Mathew T. Thomas (born 1961), Indian politician
- Mathew Thomas (born 2002), Indian actor
- Matt Doll (real name Matthew Thomas, born 1969), Australian musician

== See also ==
- Thomas Matthews (disambiguation)
