= Toussaint Louverture (film) =

- DVD cover
- Directed by: Philippe Niang
- Written by: Philippe Niang
- Produced by: Jean-Louis Monthieux; France Zobda; Régine Larcher
- Starring: Jimmy Jean-Louis; Aïssa Maïga; Sonia Rolland
- Cinematography: Dominique Bouilleret
- Edited by: Jean-Daniel Fernandez Qundez
- Music by: Michel Amsellem; Christophe Monthieux; Krishoo Monthieux
- Production company: France 2
- Distributed by: France 2
- Release date: February 9, 2012 (Festival de Luchon)
- Running time: 182 minutes
- Country: France
- Languages: French; Haitian Creole

Toussaint Louverture [tusɛ̃ luvɛʁtyʁ] is a 2012 French film written and directed by Philippe Niang. It stars Jimmy Jean-Louis, Aïssa Maïga and Sonia Rolland and is based on the life of Toussaint Louverture.

The film premiered at the 2012 Festival de Luchon. It won the Best Diaspora Feature award at the 8th Africa Movie Academy Awards.

== Cast ==
- Jimmy Jean-Louis as Toussaint Louverture
- Aïssa Maïga as Suzanne
- Arthur Jugnot as Pasquier
- Pierre Cassignard as général de division Étienne Maynaud de Bizefranc de Laveaux
- Éric Viellard as Léger-Félicité Sonthonax
- Magloire Delcros-Varaud as Mars Plaisir
- Féodor Atkine as général de division Marie-François Auguste de Caffarelli du Falga
- Ruddy Sylaire as Georges Biassou
- Giovanni Grangerac as Infant Hyacinthe Moïse
- Yann Ebonge as Hyacinthe Moïse
- Thierry Desroses as Henri Christophe
- Hubert Koundé as Jean-Jacques Dessalines
- Philippe Caroit as Bayon
- Sonia Rolland as Marie-Eugénie Sonthonax
- Stany Coppet as Brigadier general André Rigaud
- Virginie Desarnauts as Catherine Delambre
- Alex Martin as Mulatto officer
- Mabô Kouyaté as Placide
- Joffrey Platel as général de division Charles Leclerc
- Xavier Lemaître as Marquis d'Hermona
- Thomas Langmann as Napoleon
- Valérie Mairesse as Mother Coulinge
- Jessica Geneus as Vertueuse

== Plot summary ==
Part 1: "The Flight of the Eagle"

A slave deemed too old and not productive enough by his owner, Toussaint's father was thrown into the waters of Cap-Français, under the eyes of his own son, then only 8 years old. As an adult, Toussaint (Jimmy Jean-Louis) is employed on the Bréda estate by Bayon de Libertat (Philippe Caroit), who teaches him to read and write. The young man discovers the texts of Abbé Raynal, an Enlightenment philosopher who advocates the abolition of slavery. Toussaint then chooses to abandon his wife Suzanne (Aïssa Maïga) and their two children to become the leader of a group of rebellious slaves. The Spanish troops noticed his military talents and enlisted him in the army which fought against France.

Part 2: "The Battle of the Eagles"

On the eve of the French Revolution, Toussaint Louverture rises to lead the enslaved people of Saint Domingue to fight for their freedom against French colonial rule. A man of strong character and democratic convictions, he is inspired by the ideals of the nascent French Republic. He allies himself with France after fighting alongside the Spanish and the English, having refused an alliance with the United Slates. When Consul Bonaparte (Thomas Langmann), crowned emperor in December 1804, betrays him, Santo Domingo declares its independence and takes the name of Haiti. At the cost of his life, Toussaint makes his country the first independent American state to permanently abolish slavery. From his prison cell at Fort de Joux, he reflects on every choice he made, every battle he fought, and every sacrifice he endured.
