= Emily Coates =

English actress

- Born: Emily Coates; Basingstoke, England
- Years active: 2019–present

Emily Coates is an English actress. On television, she is best known for her roles in the BBC Three comedy Ladhood (2019–2022), the Netflix series Cursed (2020) and the 5 series Missed Call (2026).

== Early life ==
Coates was born in Basingstoke, Hampshire. Coates joined the National Youth Theatre.

== Career ==
In 2019, Coates made her television debut when she began playing Rachel Fielder in the BBC Three and BBC iPlayer comedy series Ladhood and had a recurring role as Jenny in the BBC One sitcom Warren. She also made guest appearances in episodes of the W series Flack and the Channel 4 drama Ackley Bridge. In 2020, Coates had a prominent supporting role as the villain Sister Iris in the Netflix Arthurian fantasy series Cursed.

It was then announced Coates would make her feature film debut in the live-action adaptation of Disney's The Little Mermaid as a new character named Rosa. The film premiered in 2023. Also in 2023, Coates had a recurring role as Petra in the third and final season of the Hulu historical comedy-drama The Great.

The following year, Coates appeared in the Sky Max Christmas film Bad Tidings. In 2026, Coates starred as Katie Gleason in the 5 series Missed Call.

== Filmography ==
Year	Title	Role	Notes
2019	Flack	Milly	Episode: "Calvin"
2019	Warren	Jenny	2 episodes
2019	Ackley Bridge	Lucy Pellow	1 episode
2019–2022	Ladhood	Rachel Fielder	9 episodes
2020	Cursed	Sister Iris	8 episodes
2021	Tiny Dancer	Sophie	Short film
2023	The Little Mermaid	Rosa	
2023	The Great	Petra	7 episodes
2023	The Long Shadow	Tracey Browne	1 episode
2024	Bad Tidings	Ashleigh Brennan	Television film
2026	Missed Call	Katie Gleason	Main role
