= Thomas Matthews =

Thomas or Tom Matthews may refer to:

- Thomas Matthews (actor) (1805–1889), British actor and pantomimist
- Thomas Matthews (engineer) (1849–1930), British civil engineer
- Tom Matthews (trade unionist) (1866-1915), British-born trade unionist active in the US and South Africa
- Stanley Matthews (judge) (Thomas Stanley Matthews, 1824–1889), American judge
- T. S. Matthews (Thomas Stanley Matthews, 1901–1991), American editor for Time magazine, grandson of Stanley
- Thomas A. Matthews, American astronomer
- Thomas Matthews (English cricketer) (1845–1932), English cricketer
- Thomas Matthews (Australian cricketer) (1905–1990), Australian cricketer
- Thomas Matthews (cyclist) (1884–1969), British cyclist
- Thomas Matthews (table tennis) (born 1992), British Paralympic table tennis player
- Thomas Matthews (colonel), United States Army colonel

== Fictional ==
- Thomas Matthews (Dexter), a character in the American television drama series Dexter

== See also ==
- Thomas Mathews (1676–1751), British Royal Navy admiral
- Thomas Mathews (politician) (1742–1812), American Revolutionary War general and Virginia politician
