= Thomas Matthews (actor) =

British actor and pantomimist

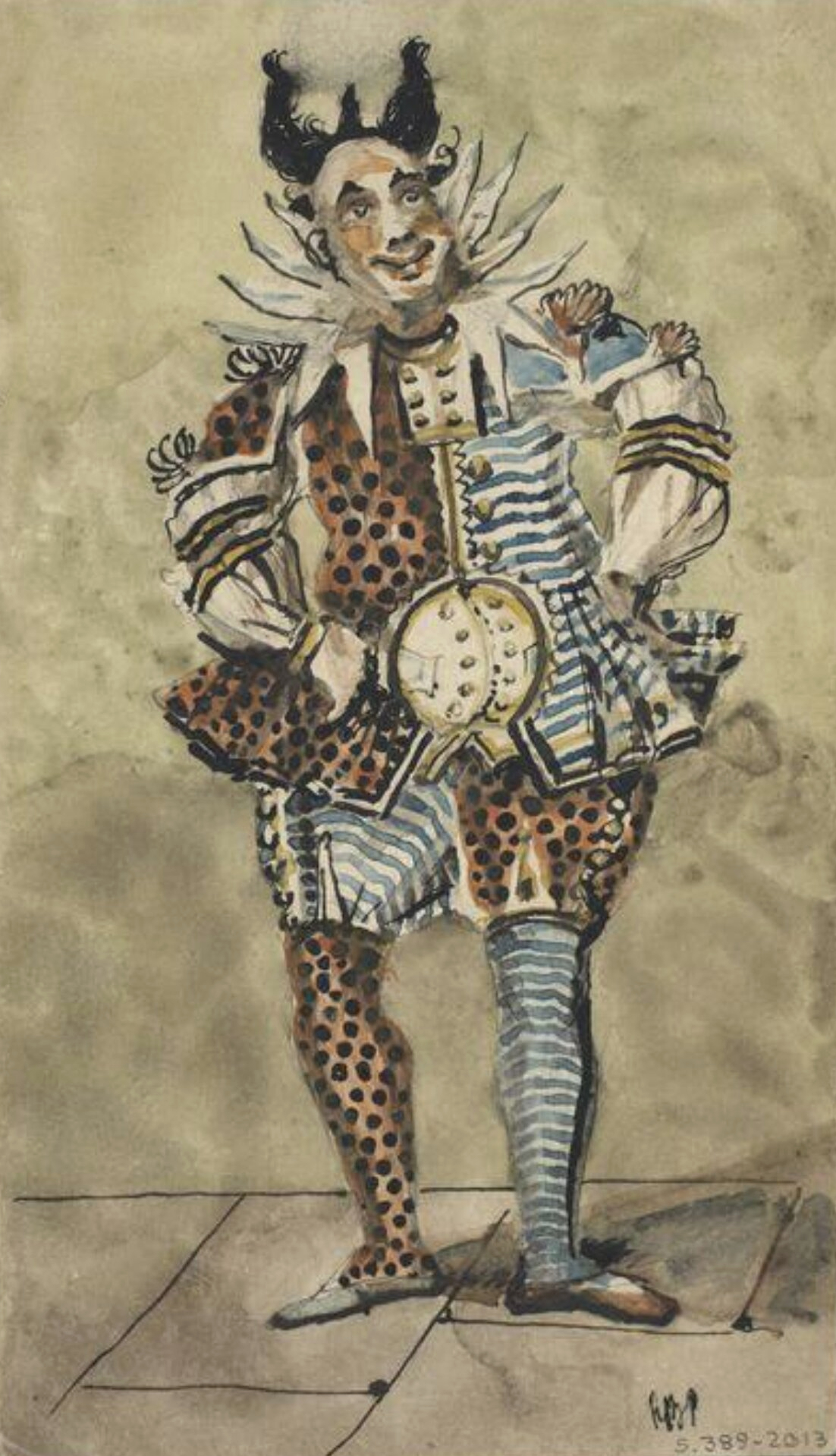
- Matthews as a clown
- Born: 17 October 1805
- Died: 4 March 1889 (aged 83); Brighton
- Occupations: Actor and pantomimist

Thomas Matthews (17 October 1805 – 4 March 1889) was a British actor and pantomimist.

== Biography ==
Matthews was born on 17 October 1805, entered as a boy the office of the Independent Whig, subsequently known after other changes as the Sunday Times. After appearing at the Olympic Theatre he went to Sadler's Wells, where, on the retirement of Grimaldi in 1828, he appeared on 26 December 1829 as clown in a pantomime called The Hag of the Forest. Upon the revival of Mother Goose he played clown for fifty nights, after being coached by Grimaldi. He then appeared at Covent Garden in successive years in Puss in Boots, Old Mother Hubbard, Whittington and his Cat, and Gammer Gurton. At Drury Lane he created a sensation by imitating Duvernay in La Cachuca. His Orson was also a hit. Engaged by Macready at £3 per week, on 20 July 1837 he reappeared at Covent Garden, where he brought out Fair Rosamond, and danced a mock bayadère dance. He visited Scotland and played in Edinburgh and elsewhere, and returned to the Olympic in Nelson Lee's pantomime Riddle me, Riddle me Ree; then went to Paris where, in August 1842, he superintended the production at the Variétés of a pantomime called Arlequin. Théophile Gautier spoke of his get-up as of "a rare fantasy", and praised his parody of the Cachuca (L'Art Dramatique en France, ii. 260).

In 1843 he played at Drury Lane in Planché's Fortunio, was seen in ballet at Vauxhall with the Paynes and Rosina Wright in 1847, was clown in 1848 in Harlequin Lord Lovel at the Surrey, was at the Marylebone in 1851, and in the following year was at Drury Lane in Blanchard's Dame Durden and the Droll Days of the Merry Monarch. In other pantomimes at the Adelphi, Drury Lane, Covent Garden, and in the country, he was familiarly known, singing constantly the songs of "Hot Codlings", "Tippitywitchet", and the "Life of a Clown", the last composed for him by Balfe. In 1859 he gave an entertainment. After this he played at Drury Lane in the burlesque introductions to various pantomimes. His last appearance was at Drury Lane in 1865 in Hop o' my Thumb. He then retired. After being bedridden for four months he died at Brighton on 4 March 1889, and was buried in Brighton cemetery. He was the last of the old-fashioned clowns, sang in approved fashion, transmitted the traditions of Grimaldi, was a prudent man, and was much respected.
