= Picture Me: A Model's Diary =

2010 documentary film

- Directed by: Ole Schell; Sara Ziff
- Produced by: David Hochschild; Ole Schell; Sara Ziff; James Lefkowitz
- Starring: Sara Ziff
- Music by: Jordan Galland
- Production company: Digital Bazooka
- Distributed by: Strand Releasing
- Release dates: September 17, 2010 (New York City); September 24, 2010 (Los Angeles)
- Running time: 80 minutes
- Country: United States
- Language: English

Picture Me: A Model's Diary is a 2010 American documentary film directed by Ole Schell and Sara Ziff. The film follows Ziff's career as a fashion model and examines the working conditions, pressures and contradictions of the modeling industry.

== Production ==
''Picture Me: A Model's Diary'' was co-directed by Ziff and Schell. The film was developed from footage Schell and Ziff shot over several years as Ziff pursued a modeling career. AFI Catalog lists Schell and Ziff as directors, producers, cinematographers and editors, alongside producer James Lefkowitz and additional cinematography by Caitriona Balfe and Sam McCourt.

The film features appearances by Ziff, Caitríona Balfe, Karl Lagerfeld and Nicole Miller.

== Release ==
The film opened in New York City on September 17, 2010, and in Los Angeles on September 24, 2010. It was shown at the Melbourne International Film Festival in 2010.

== Reception ==
On Metacritic, the film has a score of 44 out of 100 based on four critic reviews, indicating "mixed or average" reviews.

Kevin Thomas of the Los Angeles Times gave the film a positive review, describing it as a revealing behind-the-scenes documentary about fashion modeling and Ziff's changing relationship with the profession. Writing for Time Out, Nick Schager was more critical, arguing that the film addressed the industry's darker aspects but offered limited insight beyond familiar criticisms. In Slant Magazine, Glenn Heath Jr. also criticized the film's structure and pacing, while acknowledging its attempt to examine the contradictions of the modeling industry.
