= Cursed (2020 TV series) =

American fantasy drama television series

- Genre: Fantasy drama
- Created by: Frank Miller; Tom Wheeler
- Based on: Cursed by: Frank Miller; Tom Wheeler
- Starring: Katherine Langford; Devon Terrell; Gustaf Skarsgård; Daniel Sharman; Sebastian Armesto; Lily Newmark; Peter Mullan; Shalom Brune-Franklin; Bella Dayne; Matt Stokoe
- Composer: Jeff Russo
- Country of origin: United States
- Original language: English
- No. of seasons: 1
- No. of episodes: 10

Production
- Executive producers: Frank Miller; Tom Wheeler
- Producer: Alex Boden
- Production location: United Kingdom
- Running time: 48–59 minutes
- Production companies: Arcanum; Frank Miller Ink

Original release
- Network: Netflix
- Release: July 17, 2020

Cursed is an American fantasy drama television series that premiered on Netflix on July 17, 2020. It is based on the 2019 graphic novel of the same name by Frank Miller and Tom Wheeler. It is a re-imagining of the Arthurian legend set in a fantasy version of medieval Great Britain and stars Katherine Langford as Nimue, the Lady of the Lake. In July 2021, the series was canceled after one season.

== Premise ==
Cursed is described as "a re-imagining of the Arthurian legend, told through the eyes of Nimue, a young heroine with a mysterious gift who is destined to become the powerful (and tragic) Lady of the Lake. After her mother's death, she finds an unexpected partner in Arthur, a young mercenary, in a quest to find Merlin and deliver an ancient sword to him. Over the course of her journey, Nimue will become a symbol of courage and rebellion against the terrifying Red Paladins, and their complicit King Uther." The show is described as "a coming-of-age story whose themes are familiar to our own time: the obliteration of the natural world, religious terror, senseless war, and finding the courage to lead in the face of the impossible".

== Cast and characters ==
=== Main ===
- Katherine Langford as Nimue, a young Fey woman who is shunned by her village, as they believe she is "cursed". Her village is soon slaughtered by religious zealots, "the Red Paladins", but she escapes and is entrusted with the legendary Sword of Power by her mother Lenore, who tells her to get it to "Merlin" moments before Lenore's death at the hands of the Paladins. Setting out on a journey to save her people from a holy war of extinction, Nimue struggles with the corrupting power of the Sword, while coming to grips with her secret history, the powerful magical legacy that flows in her blood, and what it will mean for her and her people when she embraces her destiny as the "Wolf-Blood Witch", and eventually as the Fey Queen.
- Devon Terrell as Arthur, a sellsword and Nimue's love interest who struggles to rise above the shadow of dishonour and debts left in the wake of his father's death. He becomes an ally of the Fey and slowly begins to regain his family's honour on his journey with Nimue.
- Gustaf Skarsgård as Merlin, a once-formidable magician who has lived for hundreds of years and is now the closest advisor to Uther Pendragon. He seeks to redeem a morally bankrupt past by destroying the Sword of Power when he discovers it still exists, revealing it contains dark magic that will corrupt its wielder and was the loss of his formidable magical powers.
- Daniel Sharman as Weeping Monk / Lancelot, the most powerful warrior in the army of the zealots. He is seen consistently to be the turning point in conflicts between human and Fey, and is seemingly able to track and lead the Paladins to Fey wherever they go, killing them without mercy, though he claims to spare children to spread his message.
- Sebastian Armesto as King Uther, a powerful but deluded king who uses Merlin's counsel as a crutch until discovering he can no longer do magic and his larger manipulations. Uther turns to his mother for guidance, but her political aspirations create a rift between them that forces Uther to take his own counsel. He seeks the Sword of Power, which will solidify his illegitimate claim to the Pendragon Throne.
- Lily Newmark as Pym, Nimue's closest friend who escapes the destruction of their village at the start of the series. She is rescued by Dof after being separated from Nimue, and falls in with Red Spear's pirate raiders, masquerading as a healer in order to stay alive.
- Peter Mullan as Father Carden, the leader of the Red Paladins and the fanatic responsible for their formation under the Roman Catholic faith. He spreads the misguided rhetoric of Fey being demons and leads the Paladins in his goals to hunt Fey to inevitable extinction. He manipulates Lancelot into hunting his own kind on the Paladins' behalf as the Weeping Monk.
- Shalom Brune-Franklin as Sister Igraine / Morgana, Arthur's estranged sister who was sent to a convent as a girl but grew to become the greatest human ally of the Fey. She uses her grandmother's name "Igraine" to conceal her true identity at the abbey and shelters Nimue for a time before leading her to a settlement of Fey where the latter soon becomes Fey Queen, taking Morgana as one of her chief advisors. Morgana eventually learns she contains the potential to become Britannia's greatest sorceress from a Dark God.
- Bella Dayne as Red Spear, the Queen of the Red Spear fleet of pirate raiders and the exiled daughter of Cumber who eventually becomes an ally of the Fey.
- Matt Stokoe as the Green Knight / Gawain, an old friend of Nimue and a champion warrior of the Fey who works to rescue the Fey from their persecution.

=== Recurring ===
- Emily Coates as Sister Iris, a teenage girl who grew up in the convent with Morgana and desires to join the Red Paladins – she soon becomes obsessed with killing the Wolf-Blood Witch.
- Polly Walker as Lady Lunete, Queen Regent and Uther's mother, who cares more about her crown than her son, and who harbours a secret.
- Billy Jenkins as Squirrel / Percival, a young Fey boy and one of the only other survivors of the Sky People village.
- Adaku Ononogbo as Kaze, a Fey warrior who defends her people and helps Nimue.
- Johannes Haukur Johannesson as Cumber, the Ice King who claims legitimacy to the Pendragon Throne and commands an army to reclaim it from Uther Pendragon. When he learns of the existence of the Sword of Power, he and his daughters scheme to claim it and so come into conflict with Uther and the Fey.
- Sofia Oxenham as Eydis, eldest daughter to Cumber, who operates as his roving ambassador
- Clive Russell as Wroth, Chief of a Fey tribe called the Tusks
- Sophie Harkness as Sister Celia, a fellow nun and Morgana's lover
- Nikolaj Dencker Schmidt as Dof, a raider who rescues Pym and takes a liking to her
- Zoë Waites as the Widow, a mysterious character who allies with Merlin throughout the course of the series, helping him in times of need. She wears a black veil concealing her identity, but promises Merlin that he will see her face one day.
- Terence Maynard as Brother Salt

=== Notable guests ===
- Catherine Walker as Lenore, Nimue's mother who gives her the Sword of Power at the start of the series to give to Merlin before her death. It is revealed that she and Merlin shared a brief romance many years ago which conceived and is responsible for Nimue's vast magical powers. Before her death, Lenore had become the High Priestess of the Sky People.
- Andrew Whipp as Jonah, Nimue's father who believes she was cursed as a child
- Peter Guinness as Sir Ector, Arthur's and Morgana's uncle who does not approve of Arthur
- Olafur Darri Olafsson as Rugen the Leper King, who is manipulated by Merlin and seeks to acquire the Sword of Power for his own faction
- Clive Francis as Pope Abel, the pope of the Roman Catholic Church and commander of the Trinity Guards. He threatens to have his Trinity Guards take over Father Carden's Red Paladins if he is unable to produce results.

== Episodes ==
No.	Title	Directed by	Teleplay by	Original release date
1	"Nimue"	Zetna Fuentes	Tom Wheeler	July 17, 2020
Nimue is Fey, living in a little village outside of Hawksbridge. Because of her magical abilities she is not well integrated. During a ritual she is chosen to be the new summoner. But, because Nimue is not interested she chooses to flee with her best friend Pym. As the boat she was planning to leave on has already left, they meet Arthur. After they enrage Bors, they are chased into a forest where they hide. Back in the village, the red paladins have already attacked and destroyed the village. Nimue's dying mother, Lenore gives her daughter a sword to bring to Merlin. As Nimue runs away she uses the sword to kill the wolves, who had followed her.
2	"Cursed"	Zetna Fuentes	Tom Wheeler	July 17, 2020
While Nimue is looking for Squirrel, she remembers, a demon attacked her when she was still a young fey and she defended herself with her summoning abilities. In the present she is assaulted by a red paladin, who she fights with the Hidden. Squirrel is kidnapped by the weeping Monk to bait Squirrel's friends and kills them. Father Carden finds the almost dead red paladin, which Nimue fought earlier and sends his sons to search for her. Meanwhile, Nimue sneaks into the city and meets Arthur. After they are recognized by Bors, they run away and hide. There, Nimue tells Arthur of her mission, to bring the sword to Merlin. Later, Arthur steals the sword to bring it to Merlin, while Nimue is sleeping in a safe spot. Rain turns to blood in King Uther's castle which results in Merlin fleeing from the King's rage. After fleeing from King Uther Merlin meets the Widow and asks her for an object to transport Fey Fire.
3	"Alone"	Daniel Nettheim	Janet Lin	July 17, 2020
Arthur rides to Gramaire to ask for an audience with his uncle. He wants support to join a tournament. After Arthur lies about the swords history, Bors arrives and uncovers the truth. Arthur is captured by red paladins, who take the sword. Meanwhile, Nimue wakes up in an abbey full of red paladins. A sister named Igraine cares for her. Sister Iris suspects Nimue to be a demon. Nimue, stating her name is Alice, becomes a sister herself and heals a deeply injured red paladin with fey medicine, one Nimue herself injured. The weeping monk smells that a Fey is present, so Father Carden lets all sisters group up. Nimue flees with help from Igraine who reveals that her real name is Morgana and that she is Arthur's sister. Igraine tells Nimue that Arthur probably went to Gramaire. Merlin gets the cursed object from the Widow and asks for an audience at Rugens.
4	"The Red Lake"	Daniel Nettheim	Rachel Shukert	July 17, 2020
Pym gets picked up by a fisherman. Arthur flees from the red paladins. Nimue is picked up by a Fey-smuggler, who drives her to Gramaire, where she again meets Arthur. Together they search for the sword. On their way they find the Fey-smuggler dead. Nearby is another wagon, in which Nimue finds the sword and uses it to arrange a massacre in a lake, where red paladins wash themselves, causing the lake to get red. Afterwards they follow signs in the trees to a safe city, named Nemos, where many Feys hide from the red paladins. Pym flees from the fisherman. Merlin talks to Rugen and steals some fey fire and runs away. Sister Iris burns down the abbey and flees.
5	"The Joining"	Daniel Nettheim	Leila Gerstein	July 17, 2020
The Ice King Cumber addresses a War against King Uther. Pym joins their opponents, the red Spear, as a healer. Merlin rides back to Uther and gets arrested. Sister Iris, now obsessed with killing Nimue, joins the Fey in Nemos. Morgana appears in Nemos and gets Nimue to write a letter to Merlin. The pope forces Father Carden to increase his efforts to kill the Wolf-Blood Witch. Merlin is about to be executed, but Nimue's letter saves him, as the letter tells that the Wolf-Blood Witch will bring him the sword. The leader of the fey arrives, the Green Knight, whom Nimue knows as Gawain. Squirrel also gets to Nemos. By a druid ritual, Merlin and Nimue talk to each other and Nimue realizes that he is her father.
6	"Festa and Moreii"	Jon East	William Wheeler	July 17, 2020
Nimue rides with Kaze and Morgana to an old castle, named Festa and Moreii. The weeping Monk starts burning the feys fields, so Gawain creates a group to defend the last windmill. Arthur joins him, although they don't like each other. Merlin shows Nimue his past with Lenore. They first met, when Merlin had deep pain, so Lenore took out the sword out of him, causing him to lose his magic. After times of love, he is enraged and she asks him to leave. Merlin also shows Nimue, how to control her powers. Later, Nimue sees another memory of Merlin, in which he kills children, inducing Nimue wanting to leave. As knights of king Uther arrive, she flees with her allies, letting Merlin alone. Meanwhile, the weeping Monk attacks Arthur.
7	"Bring Us In Good Ale"	Jon East	Tom Wheeler	July 17, 2020
Gawain saves Arthur and they entrench themselves in the mill. Rugen pays a bounty hunter to kill Merlin. Merlin demands a favor of an old friend. Nimue, Kaze and Morgana enter a cave, in which an old invisible witch, named Callieach dwells. After Nimue impulsively throws the sword in a canyon due to Merlin's warning that the sword will shape her for revenge and death just as it did him, Morgana searches for the sword and meets an obsessed dead Celia, who appears and speaks through the power of the Callieach and tries to convince Morgana to use the sword for herself. Pym offers the idea to attack the red paladins, but they are overrun as they overestimate themselves. The red paladins start burning the mill. Arthur and Gawain fight through some red paladins until they are saved by Nimue's magic which turns the Red Paladins on each other. Merlin leagues with Cumber by bringing him the midwife who assisted the Queen in swapping her stillborn child for a peasant child who became Uther Pendragon. Back in Nemos Nimue is celebrated and now known as the Queen of the Fey.
8	"The Fey Queen"	Jon East	Robbie Thompson	July 17, 2020
The weeping Monk has found Nemos. Nimue and the Fey run away and attack Gramaire to take their resources and use the city to remain safe for a few days until the ships to flee arrive. Cumber spreads the information that he is the true heir of the crown, while rejecting the help from Father Carden and Merlin. The Queen Mother tells Uther of his true heritage. Merlin meets the Widow, who tells him that Nimue will die. Pym, now reunited with Nimue asks her to heal Dof, but he dies as she is weakened from taking Gramaire. Morgana sees the Widow taking the souls of the wounded Red Paladin due to being infected by Callieach and one of her spiders. On a rescue mission Gawain is injured by and kidnapped by the Weeping Monk. Nimue becomes more obsessed with the power of the sword and fights with Arthur about leaving Gramaire, but finally sees reason only to discover the ships are not coming. King Uther groups up with Father Carden and starts an attack on Gramaire.
9	"Poisons"	Sarah O'Gorman	Tom Wheeler	July 17, 2020
The bounty hunter dies while trying to kill Merlin, but manages to poison Merlin. Merlin flees to Nimue and tells her the Ice King's offer of safety in his dungeons if she surrenders the sword. Nimue grants him to live in Gramaire, but doesn't accept the offer. King Uther also sends a similar offer, but Nimue declines. Shortly after, King Uther poisons his mother with spiced wine as revenge for killing his birth mother in the same fashion. Gawain gets tortured by Brother Salt but does not speak. Gawain talks to the Weeping Monk and tells him that he knows he is Fey but will not betray a Fey brother to the Red Paladins and encourages him to join the Fey. Squirrel tries to save Gawain, but fails and is also captured. Nimue accepts another offer from Uther, in which he offers her ships in exchange for her. Nimue and Arthur sleep together as a goodbye. Cumber accepts Father Carden's offer to kill the Wolf-Blood Witch.
10	"The Sacrifice"	Sarah O'Gorman	Tom Wheeler	July 17, 2020
Consummating her relationship with Arthur, Nimue convinces him to lead the Fey should Uther betray them. Morgana confronts the Widow, who informs her the Dark Gods have cursed her, then threatens her life and departs. Nimue entrusts Morgana with the Sword and has her leave the city to keep it safe. Learning the Fey have safely reached the harbour, Nimue hands herself over to Uther as payment. Cumber's army attacks Arthur and the Fey as they dock, but Red Spear's army helps them repel the attack. Nimue demands Uther release Squirrel and Gawain in exchange for the Sword, but after finding Gawain dead, she lashes out, earning the Paladins's attention. The Weeping Monk rescues Squirrel and they flee, killing several Trinity Guards. Morgana kills and becomes the Widow, rescues Nimue before the Paladins can execute her, and gives her the Sword so she can behead father Carden. Fighting off the Paladins, Morgana leads Nimue to Merlin and the three flee Uther's camp, but Iris pursues and fires an arrow that sends Nimue over a waterfall to her apparent death. Enraged, Merlin reclaims the Sword and with it his magic, killing many Paladins and escaping with Morgana. On the road, Squirrel and the Weeping Monk reveal their true names: Percival and Lancelot. Iris, her face scarred by Merlin's wrathful lightning, receives her place in the Trinity for killing the Wolf-Blood Witch.

== Production ==
=== Development ===
On March 28, 2018, it was announced that Netflix had given the production a series order for a first season consisting of ten episodes. The show is based on the graphic novel of the same name by Frank Miller and Tom Wheeler, which had been announced six days prior and was published by Simon & Schuster in 2019. In addition to creating the television adaptation, Miller and Wheeler were also expected to executive produce the series as well. In September 2018 it was announced that Zetna Fuentes is set to direct and serve as an executive producer for the first two episodes of the series. On July 9, 2021, Netflix canceled the series after one season.

=== Casting ===
In September 2018, Katherine Langford was cast in the series' lead role. In March 2019, it was announced Devon Terrell, Gustaf Skarsgård, Peter Mullan, Lily Newmark, Shalom Brune-Franklin, Daniel Sharman, Sebastian Armesto, Emily Coates and Billy Jenkins had joined the cast. Creator Frank Miller appears in a cameo.

=== Filming ===
In January 2019, set building began on disused Army land in Deepcut, England. This was expected to continue until March 2019, with filming then scheduled to start and continue until September 2019.

== Release ==
The series was released on Netflix on July 17, 2020.

== Reception ==
Review aggregator Rotten Tomatoes compiled 52 reviews, identified 67% of them as positive, and assessed an average rating of 6.06/10. The website's critics consensus states, "Cursed's first season isn't as subversive as its source material, but strong plotting and a heroic performance from Katherine Langford make for an enjoyable escape." Metacritic, which uses a weighted average, assigned the show a score of 59 out of 100 based on 13 reviews, indicating "mixed or average reviews". Lucy Mangan from The Guardian criticized the writing and the acting, but wrote that "at times during its 10 beautifully meaningless hours, it's great fun". Huw Fullerton of Radio Times also opined about the "awkward performances and exposition" while saying that the series "never quite feels big enough to tell this epic story [...] but overall the storytelling does a good job of showcasing varied, interesting characters in a growing cycle of violence." Kelly Lawler of USA Today reviewed the series in relation to the COVID-19 pandemic, giving it an overall positive review, but stating that she was not sure whether it was good or simply "quarantine good".
