= David Attenborough's Natural History Museum Alive =

- Also known as: David Attenborough's Natural History Museum Alive
- Genre: Documentary
- Written by: David Attenborough
- Directed by: Daniel M. Smith
- Presented by: David Attenborough
- Music by: Ilan Eshkeri
- Country of origin: United Kingdom
- Original language: English

Production
- Running time: 64 minutes

Original release
- Network: Sky One
- Release: 1 January 2014

David Attenborough's Natural History Museum Alive is a 2014 British documentary film. Written and presented by David Attenborough, it aired on Sky One on New Year's Day 2014.

The documentary was filmed at the Natural History Museum, London, and uses CGI imagery to bring life to several of the extinct animal skeletons in the museum, including Archaeopteryx, the giant moa and Haast's eagle, Gigantopithecus (contrasting prevailing expert opinion; presented as bipedal and more hominin than pongine), the dodo, Glossotherium, Smilodon, Gigantophis, Ichthyosaurus and the London-based replica of the famous Diplodocus skeleton, Dippy.

The documentary was well-received, and won a TV BAFTA in the specialist factual category. A 3D companion book for the documentary was released under the same name.

'The Making of David Attenborough's Natural History Museum Alive' was also released to accompany the documentary.

An immersive iOS app called 'Museum Alive' was released to accompany the film.

On February 19, 2025, 11 years after its original release, it premiered in America on PBS as part of the TV series Nature under the title “Museum Alive with David Attenborough."
