= The Naked Civil Servant =

The Naked Civil Servant is the title of two biographical works, both based on the life of Quentin Crisp:

- The Naked Civil Servant (book) is Crisp's 1968 autobiographical book
- The Naked Civil Servant (film) is a 1975 television film based on the book
