= Martina Mayne =

German actress

- Martina Mayne as Millicent Channing in "The Case of the Greystone Inscription" (1955), an episode of the television series Sherlock Holmes.
- Born: Martina Schulof; 1925; Berlin
- Died: 2013 (aged 87–88)
- Occupations: Actress, art therapist, poet and translator
- Known for: Produced the first published translation into English of the work of the German poet Paula Ludwig

Martina Thomson, stage name Martina Mayne, (c. 1925–2013) was a German actress, art therapist, poet and translator, active in England. In 2009 she produced the first published translation into English of the work of the German poet Paula Ludwig.

== Early life and family ==
Martina Thomson was born Martina Schulof in Berlin around 1925 to Austrian parents. She was educated at the Rudolf Steiner school there but travelled to London with her family just before the start of the Second World War where her uncle, George Hoellering, worked at the Academy Cinema in Oxford Street. She was evacuated to the Cotswolds during the war and afterwards trained as an actor at the Royal Academy of Dramatic Art.

Her first marriage was short. In 1964 she married, secondly, the BBC sound producer David Thomson with whom she had three sons, Tim, Luke and Ben. She had eight grandchildren and a great-grandchild at the time of her death.

== Career ==
Under the stage name of Martina Mayne, she acted in radio plays produced for the BBC by her husband and often played foreign roles in England and English ones on German radio. In 1952 she appeared on the panel for One Minute Please, the forerunner to the BBC's long-running Just a Minute. She later provided voices for erotic films. In 1967 she appeared with Quentin Crisp as Marcella in the short surrealist film Captain Busby The Even Tenour of Her Ways based on a poem by Philip O'Connor.

In the 1970s, she trained as an art therapist under E. M. Lyddiatt and in 1989 wrote On Art and Therapy. Her poetry was published in magazines and collected in Ferryboats in 2007. In 2009 she produced the first published translation into English of the work of the German expressionist poet Paula Ludwig, whom she remembered visiting her parents' home in Berlin.

== Death ==
Mayne died from pneumonia in 2013 at the age of 88 after suffering from bone cancer.

== Selected roles ==
- I'm a Stranger – Mary (1952)
- "The Case of the Greystone Inscription" – Millicent Channing (1955)
- Captain Busby The Even Tenour of Her Ways – Marcella (1967) - starring Quentin Crisp

== Selected publications ==
- On art and therapy: An exploration. Virago, 1989. ISBN 978-1-85381-045-9
- Ferryboats. Hearing Eye, London, 2007. (Torriano Meeting House Poetry Pamphlet) ISBN 978-1-905082-36-0
- Panther and gazelle: Poems of Paula Ludwig. Hearing Eye, London, 2012. (Translator) ISBN 978-1-905082-67-4
- My life, you see. Hearing Eye, London, 2022. ISBN 978-1-905082-79-7
