= List of John Hurt performances =

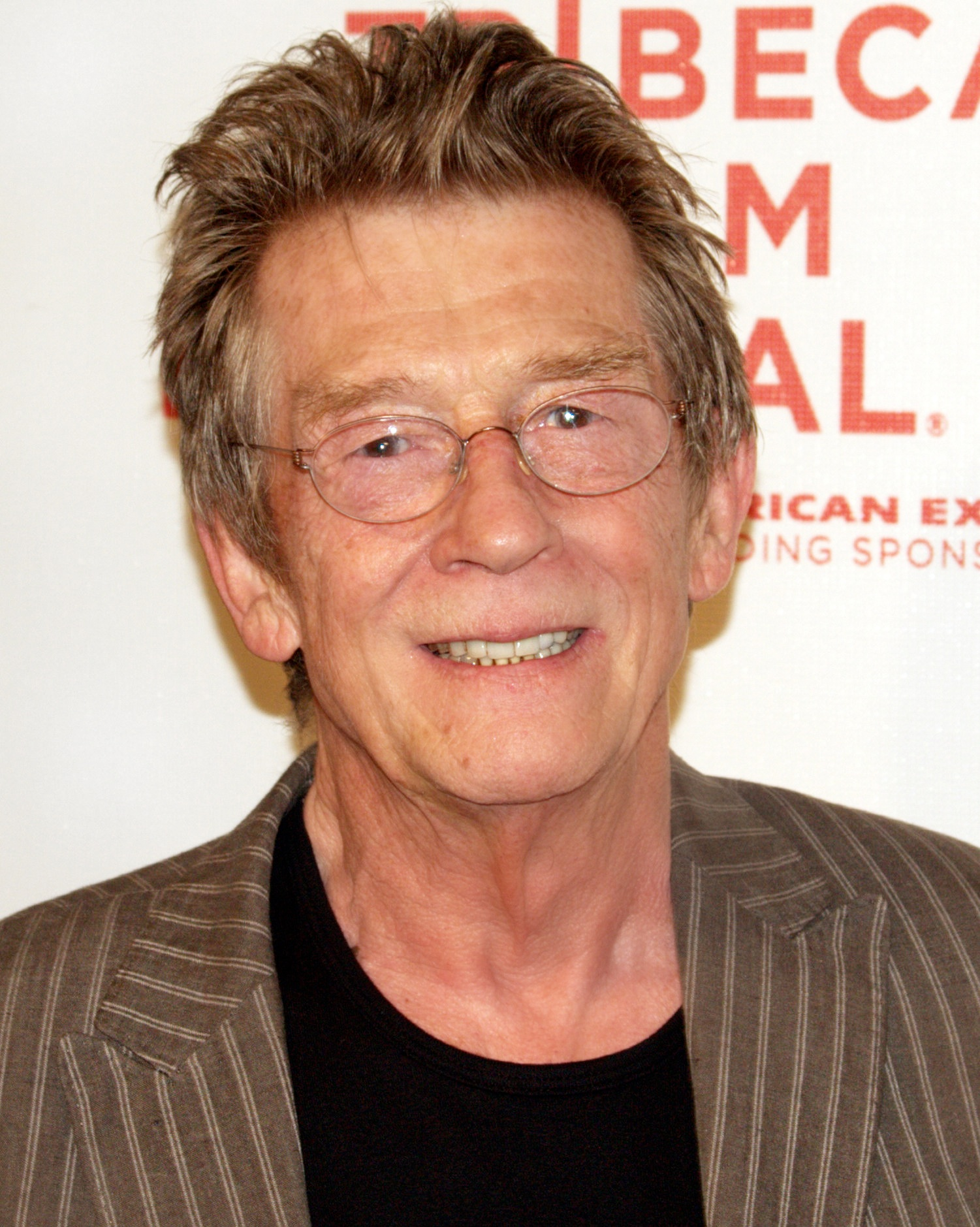
Hurt in April 2009

Sir John Hurt, CBE (1940–2017) was an English actor and voice actor, whose career spanned six decades. He had roles in over 130 films, with dozens of television roles.

== Film ==
| Year | Title | Role | Director | Notes |
|---|---|---|---|---|
| 1962 | The Wild and the Willing | Phil Corbett | Ralph Thomas | |
| 1963 | The Contact | Max | Philip Wrestler | Short film |
| 1964 | This Is My Street | Charlie | Sidney Hayers | |
| 1966 | A Man for All Seasons | Richard Rich | Fred Zinnemann | |
| 1967 | The Sailor from Gibraltar | John | Tony Richardson | |
| 1969 | Sinful Davey | Davey Haggart | John Huston | |
| 1969 | Before Winter Comes | Lieutenant Pilkington | J. Lee Thompson | |
| 1969 | In Search of Gregory | Daniel | Peter Wood | |
| 1971 | 10 Rillington Place | Timothy John Evans | Richard Fleischer | Nominated – BAFTA Award for Best Actor in a Supporting Role |
| 1971 | Mr. Forbush and the Penguins | Richard Forbush | Roy Boulting, Arne Sucksdorff & Alfred Viola | |
| 1972 | The Pied Piper | Franz | Jacques Demy | |
| 1974 | Little Malcolm | Malcolm Scrawdyke | Stuart Cooper | |
| 1975 | The Ghoul | Tom Rawlings | Freddie Francis | |
| 1975 | La Linea del fiume | Chandler | Aldo Scavarda | |
| 1977 | The Disappearance | Atkinson | Stuart Cooper | |
| 1977 | Three Dangerous Ladies | Lieutenant Simmonds | Robert Fuest | Segment: "The Island" |
| 1977 | Paperback | Unknown | David Bailey | |
| 1977 | East of Elephant Rock | Nash | Don Boyd | |
| 1978 | Midnight Express | Max | Alan Parker | Golden Globe Award for Best Supporting Actor – Motion Picture; BAFTA Award for Best Actor in a Supporting Role; Nominated – Academy Award for Best Supporting Actor |
| 1978 | The Shout | Anthony Fielding | Jerzy Skolimowski | |
| 1978 | Watership Down | Hazel | Martin Rosen | Voice |
| 1978 | The Lord of the Rings | Aragorn | Ralph Bakshi | Voice |
| 1979 | Alien | Gilbert Kane, Executive Officer | Ridley Scott | Nominated – BAFTA Award for Best Actor in a Supporting Role |
| 1980 | The Elephant Man | John Merrick | David Lynch | BAFTA Award for Best Actor in a Leading Role; Nominated – Academy Award for Best Actor; Nominated – Golden Globe Award for Best Actor – Motion Picture Drama |
| 1980 | Heaven's Gate | William C. Irvine | Michael Cimino | |
| 1981 | History of the World, Part I | Jesus Christ | Mel Brooks | |
| 1981 | Night Crossing | Peter Strelzyk | Delbert Mann | |
| 1982 | Partners | Kerwin | James Burrows | |
| 1982 | The Plague Dogs | Snitter | Martin Rosen | Voice |
| 1983 | The Osterman Weekend | Lawrence Fassett | Sam Peckinpah | |
| 1984 | Champions | Bob Champion | John Irvin | Evening Standard British Film Award for Best Actor |
| 1984 | Success Is the Best Revenge | Dino Montecurva | Jerzy Skolimowski | |
| 1984 | The Hit | Mitchell Braddock | Stephen Frears | Evening Standard British Film Award for Best Actor |
| 1984 | Nineteen Eighty-Four | Winston Smith | Michael Radford | Evening Standard British Film Award for Best Actor; Fantasporto for Best Actor (tied with Eddy Mitchell); Valladolid International Film Festival for Best Actor (tied with Richard Burton) |
| 1985 | After Darkness | Peter Hunningford | Dominique Othenin-Girard & Sergio Guerraz | |
| 1985 | The Black Cauldron | The Horned King | Ted Berman & Richard Rich | Voice |
| 1986 | Jake Speed | Sid | Andrew Lane | |
| 1987 | The Hunting of the Snark | Narrator | Mike Batt | Voice |
| 1987 | Rocinante | Bill | Ann Guedes, Eduardo Guedes | |
| 1987 | White Mischief | Gilbert Colvile | Michael Radford | |
| 1987 | From the Hip | Douglas Benoit | Bob Clark | |
| 1987 | Aria | The Actor | Bill Bryden | Segment: "Pagliacci" |
| 1987 | Spaceballs | Kane | Mel Brooks | Cameo |
| 1987 | Vincent | Narrator | Paul Cox | Voice |
| 1988 | The Bengali Night | Lucien Metz | Nicolas Klotz | |
| 1989 | Scandal | Stephen Ward | Michael Caton-Jones | |
| 1989 | Little Sweetheart | Robert Burger | Anthony Simmons | |
| 1990 | Windprints | Charles Rutherford | David Wicht | |
| 1990 | Romeo.Juliet | La Dame aux Chats; Mercutio | Armondo Linus Acosta | |
| 1990 | The Field | Bird O'Donnell | Jim Sheridan | Nominated – BAFTA Award for Best Actor in a Supporting Role |
| 1990 | Frankenstein Unbound | Joe Buchanan; The Narrator | Roger Corman | |
| 1991 | King Ralph | Lord Percival Graves | David S. Ward | |
| 1991 | I Dreamt I Woke Up | John Boorman's Alter Ego | John Boorman | |
| 1992 | Lapse of Memory | Conrad Farmer | Patrick Dewolf | |
| 1993 | L'Oeil qui ment | Anthony / Le Marquis | Raúl Ruiz | |
| 1993 | Kölcsönkapott idő | Sean | István Poór | |
| 1993 | Monolith | Villano | John Eyres | |
| 1993 | Even Cowgirls Get the Blues | The Countess | Gus Van Sant | |
| 1994 | Rabbit Ears: Aladdin and the Magic Lamp | Storyteller | C.W. Rogers | Voice; Direct-to-video |
| 1994 | Thumbelina | Mr. Mole | Don Bluth & Gary Goldman | Voice |
| 1994 | Great Moments in Aviation | Rex Goodyear | Beeban Kidron | |
| 1994 | Second Best | Uncle Turpin | Chris Menges | |
| 1995 | Rob Roy | John Graham, Marquis of Montrose | Michael Caton-Jones | |
| 1995 | Dead Man | John Scholfield | Jim Jarmusch | |
| 1995 | Wild Bill | Charley Prince | Walter Hill | |
| 1995 | Two Nudes Bathing | Marquis de Prey | John Boorman | Short film Episode of Picture Windows miniseries |
| 1997 | Love and Death on Long Island | Giles De'Ath | Richard Kwietniowski | FIPRESCI Prize – Special Mention of Chicago International Film Festival (shared with: Richard Kwietniowski); Nominated – British Independent Film Award for Best Performance by a British Actor in an Independent Film |
| 1997 | Contact | S.R. Hadden | Robert Zemeckis | |
| 1997 | The Climb | Chuck Langer | Bob Swaim | |
| 1997 | Bandyta | Babits | Maciej Dejczer | |
| 1997 | Tender Loving Care | Dr Turner | David Wheeler | Direct-to-video |
| 1998 | The Commissioner | James Morton | George Sluizer | |
| 1998 | Night Train | Michael Poole | John Lynch | |
| 1998 | All the Little Animals | Mr Summers | Jeremy Thomas | |
| 1999 | A Monkey's Tale | Sebastian | Jean-François Laguionie | English dub |
| 1999 | If... Dog... Rabbit... | Sean Cooper | Matthew Modine | |
| 1999 | You're Dead | Maitland | Andy Hurst | |
| 2000 | The Tigger Movie | Narrator | Jun Falkenstein | Voice |
| 2000 | New Blood | Alan White | Michael Hurst | |
| 2000 | Lost Souls | Father Lareaux | Janusz Kamiński | |
| 2001 | Tabloid | Vince | David Blair | |
| 2001 | Captain Corelli's Mandolin | Dr Yiannis | John Madden | |
| 2001 | Harry Potter and the Philosopher's Stone | Garrick Ollivander | Chris Columbus | |
| 2002 | Miranda | Christian | Marc Munden | |
| 2002 | Crime and Punishment | Porfiry | Menahem Golan | |
| 2003 | Owning Mahowny | Victor Foss | Richard Kwietniowski | |
| 2003 | Meeting Che Guevara & the Man from Maybury Hill | Man from Maybury Hill | Anthony Byrne | Short film |
| 2003 | Dogville | Narrator | Lars Von Trier | Voice |
| 2004 | Hellboy | Professor Trevor 'Broom' Bruttenholm | Guillermo del Toro | |
| 2004 | Pride | Harry | John Downer | Voice |
| 2005 | Short Order | Felix | Anthony Byrne | |
| 2005 | Valiant | Felix | Gary Chapman | Voice |
| 2005 | Manderlay | Narrator | Lars Von Trier | Voice |
| 2005 | The Skeleton Key | Ben Devereaux | Iain Softley | |
| 2005 | Shooting Dogs | Christopher | Michael Caton-Jones | |
| 2005 | The Proposition | Jellon Lamb | John Hillcoat | Nominated – Australian Film Institute Award for Best Actor in a Supporting Role |
| 2006 | V for Vendetta | Adam Sutler "Fake Sutler" actors | James McTeigue | |
| 2006 | Perfume: The Story of a Murderer | Narrator | Tom Tykwer | Voice |
| 2007 | Boxes | Le père de Fanny | Jane Birkin | |
| 2007 | Hellboy: Blood and Iron | Professor Trevor 'Broom' Bruttenholm | Victor Cook & Tad Stones | Voice; Direct-to-DVD |
| 2008 | The Oxford Murders | Arthur Seldom | Álex de la Iglesia | |
| 2008 | Indiana Jones and the Kingdom of the Crystal Skull | Professor Harold 'Ox' Oxley | Steven Spielberg | |
| 2008 | Hellboy II: The Golden Army | Professor Trevor 'Broom' Bruttenholm | Guillermo del Toro | Cameo |
| 2008 | Outlander | Hrothgar | Howard McCain | |
| 2008 | Lecture 21 | Mondrian Kilroy | Alessandro Baricco | |
| 2008 | New York, I Love You | Bellhop | Shekhar Kapur | Segment "Shekhar Kapur" |
| 2009 | An Englishman in New York | Quentin Crisp | Richard Laxton | |
| 2009 | The Limits of Control | Guitar | Jim Jarmusch | |
| 2009 | 44 Inch Chest | Old Man Peanut | Malcolm Venville | Nominated – London Film Critics' Circle Award for Supporting Actor of the Year |
| 2010 | Lou | Doyle | Belinda Chayko | |
| 2010 | A Turtle's Tale: Sammy's Adventures | Grandpa Sammy | Ben Stassen | Voice |
| 2010 | Brighton Rock | Phil Corkery | Rowan Joffé | |
| 2010 | Ultramarines: The Movie | Carnak | Martyn Pick | Voice |
| 2010 | Harry Potter and the Deathly Hallows – Part 1 | Garrick Ollivander | David Yates | |
| 2011 | Harry Potter and the Deathly Hallows – Part 2 | Garrick Ollivander | David Yates | |
| 2011 | Regret Not Speaking | | Richard Kwietniowski | |
| 2011 | Melancholia | Dexter | Lars Von Trier | |
| 2011 | Tinker Tailor Soldier Spy | Control | Tomas Alfredson | |
| 2011 | Immortals | Old Man / Narrator | Tarsem Singh | |
| 2012 | Jayne Mansfield's Car | Kingsley Bedford | Billy Bob Thornton | |
| 2012 | In Love with Alma Cogan | Master of Ceremonies | Tony Britten | |
| 2012 | Sightseers | Narrator – Blake's "Jerusalem" | Ben Wheatley | Uncredited voice |
| 2013 | Charlie Countryman | Narrator | Fredrik Bond | Voice; Deleted scenes |
| 2013 | Only Lovers Left Alive | Christopher Marlowe | Jim Jarmusch | |
| 2013 | Swan Lake 3D – Live from the Mariinsky Theatre | Winter Palace / Himself | Ross MacGibbon | Voice |
| 2013 | Snowpiercer | Gilliam | Bong Joon-ho | |
| 2013 | More Than Honey | Narrator | Markus Imhoof | Voice; Documentary |
| 2013 | Benjamin Britten – Peace and Conflict | Narrator | Tony Britten | |
| 2014 | Hercules | Cotys | Brett Ratner | |
| 2015 | A.K.A Nadia | 347 | Tova Asher | |
| 2015 | The Absinthe Drinkers | Antonio Argenti | John Jopson | |
| 2015 | Break | Jack | Nicholas Moss | Short film |
| 2015 | Thomas & Friends: Sodor's Legend of the Lost Treasure | Sailor John | David Stoten | Voice |
| 2016 | ChickLit | Francis Bonar | Tony Britten | |
| 2016 | The Journey | Harry Patterson | Nick Hamm | |
| 2016 | Jackie | The Priest | Pablo Larraín | |
| 2016 | Back to Utopia | Peter Panludic | Fabio Wuytack | Voice; posthumous international release |
| 2017 | My Name Is Lenny | Leslie Salmon | Ron Scalpello | Posthumous release |
| 2017 | That Good Night | Ralph | Eric Styles | Posthumous release |
| 2017 | Damascus Cover | Miki | Daniel Zelik Berk | Posthumous release |

== Television ==
| Year | Title | Role | Notes |
|---|---|---|---|
| 1961 | Drama 61-67 | Private Briggs | Episode: "Drama '61: Local Incident" |
| 1962 | Z-Cars | James Hogan | Episode: "Assault" |
| 1963 | First Night | Garry | Episode: "Menace" |
| 1964 | Armchair Theatre | Unknown | Episode: "A Jug of Bread" |
| 1964 | Thursday Theatre | Orpheus | Episode: "Point of Departure" |
| 1964 | Gideon's Way | Freddy Tinsdale | Episode: "The Tin God" |
| 1964–65 | ITV Play of the Week | Various characters | 3 episodes |
| 1973 | Wessex Tales | Joshua Harlborough | Episode: "A Tragedy of Two Ambitions" |
| 1974 | The Playboy of the Western World | Christopher 'Christy' Mahon | Television film |
| 1975 | The Naked Civil Servant | Quentin Crisp | Television film British Academy Television Award for Best Actor |
| 1976 | Shades of Greene | Fred | Episode: "A Drive in the Country" |
| 1976 | Play for Today | Alec Cassell | Episode: "The Peddler" |
| 1976 | The Sweeney | Tony Grey | Episode: "Tomorrow Man" |
| 1976 | I, Claudius | Caligula | 5 episodes |
| 1977 | Spectre | Mitri Cyon | Television film |
| 1979 | Crime and Punishment | Rodion Romanovich Raskolnikov | 3 episodes |
| 1983 | King Lear | The Fool | Television film |
| 1988 | Deadline | Granville Jones | Television film |
| 1988 | David Macaulay: Pyramid | Khufu; Second French Explorer | Television film Voice |
| 1987–88 | The Storyteller | The Storyteller | 9 episodes |
| 1990 | The Investigation: Inside a Terrorist Bombing | Chris Mullin | Television film |
| 1991 | Journey to Knock | Alfred | Television film |
| 1991 | Red Fox | Archie Carpenter | 2 episodes |
| 1992 | Six Characters in Search of an Author | The Father | Television film |
| 1993 | Great Moments in Aviation | Rex Goodyear | Television film |
| 1994 | Picture Windows | Le Compte | Episode: "Two Nudes Bathing" |
| 1995 | Prisoners in Time | Eric Lomax | Episode: "Everyman" |
| 1995 | Screen Two | Jack Lee | Episode: "Saigon Baby" |
| 1999–2000 | Watership Down | General Woundwort | Voice; 7 episodes |
| 2001 | Beckett on Film – Krapp's Last Tape | Krapp | Television film |
| 2002 | Bait | Jack Blake | Television film |
| 2004 | The Alan Clark Diaries | Alan Clark | 6 episodes |
| 2004 | Pride | Harry | Voice; Television film |
| 2005 | Hiroshima | Narrator | Voice; Documentary |
| 2007 | Masters of Science Fiction | Samswope | Episode: "The Discarded" |
| 2008 | Recount | Warren Christopher | Television film |
| 2008–2012 | Merlin | The Great Dragon | Voice; 64 episodes |
| 2009 | The Gruffalo | Owl | Voice; Television film |
| 2009 | An Englishman in New York | Quentin Crisp | Television film Berlin International Film Festival – Teddy Award; Nominated – British Academy Television Award for Best Actor |
| 2010 | Whistle and I'll Come to You | James Parkin | Television film |
| 2011 | Human Planet | Narrator | Voice; Documentary |
| 2011 | Harry's Arctic Heroes | Narrator | Voice; Documentary |
| 2011 | Planet Dinosaur | Narrator | Voice; Documentary |
| 2011 | The Gruffalo's Child | Owl | Voice; Television film |
| 2012 | Labyrinth | Audric Baillard | 2 episodes |
| 2012 | The Hollow Crown: Henry V | The Chorus | Television film |
| 2012 | Playhouse Presents | The Ministry | Voice; Episode: "The Snipist" |
| 2013 | Doctor Who | War Doctor | Episodes: "The Name of the Doctor" (cameo) and "The Day of the Doctor"; Minisode: "The Night of the Doctor" (cameo) |
| 2014 | The Strain | Professor Abraham Setrakian | Unaired pilot |
| 2015 | The Last Panthers | Tom Kendle | 6 episodes |
| 2016 | The Pity of War: The Loves and Lives of the War Poets | Siegfried Sassoon | Television film |

== Audio ==
| Year | Title | Role | Notes |
|---|---|---|---|
| 2014 | The Divine Comedy | Dante Alighieri | 3 episodes |
| 2015–2017 | Doctor Who: The War Doctor | War Doctor | 12 episodes; last three released posthumously |
| 2015 | War and Peace | Prince Bolkonsky | 10 episodes |
| 2017 | The Invisible Man | Griffin | Posthumous release |

== Video games ==
| Year | Title | Role | Notes |
|---|---|---|---|
| 1996 | Privateer 2: The Darkening | Joe the Bartender | |
| 1997 | Tender Loving Care | Dr. Turner | |
| 2015 | LEGO Dimensions | War Doctor | Archive audio |

== Other projects and contributions ==
- When Love Speaks (2002, EMI Classics) – "Sonnet 145"
  ("Those lips that Love's own hand did make")
- Hurt performs in drag for the promotional video for Attitude by the music group Suede.
- Hurt is seen as the 'Brian Epstein' esque mogul in Paul McCartney's 1982 video for his song "Take It Away". McCartney explains in the video commentary section of The McCartney Years DVD (for the song 'Take it Away') that Hurt himself was a friend of the Beatles and Brian Epstein, and that the Beatles had watched Hurt act in the mid-'60s and thought him a fine actor.
- Hurt is the narrator of the 1995 Discovery Channel documentary On Jupiter.
- Narrator on the album The Seduction of Claude Debussy by the band Art of Noise (1999).
- Hurt is the narrator of the 4 part series The Universe for Channel 4 International, released in 1999 and available on DVD.
- Hurt is a narrator for Edge of the Universe Australia and New Zealand edition in 2001
- Hurt co-starred alongside Kiefer Sutherland in the 10 part web series The Confession.
- A line from the movie Nineteen Eighty-Four featuring the voice of Hurt can be heard as the introduction to the Manic Street Preachers song "Faster"
- In two volumes of a documentary called Life in the Animal Kingdom: Untamed Africa, filmed in the Maasai Mara Game Preserve in Kenya (the two volumes being called Hunter and Hunted and Survival on the Serengeti), Hurt served as the narrator.
- Benjamin Britten – Peace and Conflict, a British feature film written and directed by Tony Britten – narrator.
- Narrator for the BBC 5 live documentary "The day we won Wimbledon."
- Narrator of the Mercedes F1 Team video ad based on the poem "If—" by Rudyard Kipling.
- Voice of the father (in the letter to his son) in the animated short The Alchemist's Letter by Carlos Andre Stevens.
- Hurt voiced the character of Griffin in an audio drama of The Invisible Man for Big Finish Productions released posthumously in February 2017.
