= The Pity of War =

The first known use of the phrase "the pity of war" was by Wilfred Owen in 1918, in the preface to his collected poems. It also appears in his poem "Strange Meeting", included in that volume.

The Pity of War may also refer to:

- The Pity of War: Explaining World War I, a non-fiction book by Niall Ferguson (1998)
- The Pity of War, a 2014 TV documentary presented by Niall Ferguson; see BBC World War I centenary season#Historical debate
- The Pity of War: The Loves and Lives of the War Poets, a 2016 ITV drama-documentary featuring John Hurt; see List of John Hurt performances
