= Panna Grady =

Patron of American literature (born 1936)

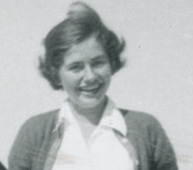
- 1954 photo of Panna de Cholnoky
- Born: Louise Marie de Cholnoky; September 20, 1936
- Other name: Panna de Cholnoky

Panna Grady O'Connor is known for her work supporting poets in the 1960s and 1970.

== Early life ==
Panna Grady O'Connor was born Louise Marie de Cholnoky in 1936. Her parents were the heiress and poet Louise Marie St. John, who died at the age of 38, and the Hungarian doctor Tibor de Cholnoky. The family lived in Greenwich, Connecticut. Panna, a Hungarian pet name used to distinguish herself from her mother, attended Abbot Academy in Andover, Massachusetts) from 1951 to 1954. She then enrolled at Wellesley College for a year and studied there with the poet and educator Philip Booth, who aroused an interest in literature in her, whereupon she moved to the University of California, Berkeley where she graduated in 1959.

In Berkeley she came into contact with the Beat Generation from neighboring San Francisco. In her house on Mosswood Lane she threw parties for the local literary and artistic scene. Andrew Barrow notes in Quentin and Philip: A Double Portrait that their first party, organized by William Stine, was also attended by Allen Ginsberg and, as guest of honor, Stephen Spender.

Grady had already spent her junior year at the School of General Studies at Columbia University in New York – and now returned to this city to study acting at the renowned Berkhof School. She married the poet and screenwriter, Jim Grady, and gave birth to their daughter Ella in 1963. The marriage didn't last long, and when it end Grady moved into an apartment in the Dakota building, where she subsequently hosted her famous parties and where Andy Warhol filmed the film Poor Little Rich Girl with Edie Sedgwick. From the early to mid-1960s, Grady made friends with writers in New York. Through Robert Lowell she met William S. Burroughs, whom she loved though they were not a couple.

Grady had a relationship with John Wieners which ended after Grady had an abortion and she moved to London with Charles Olson and Ella, where they settled in Covent Garden. While in London she also hosted writers and artists there, including Allen Ginsberg. Her partnership with Olson ended shortly after moving to London. The artist Brion Gysin started spending time at Grady's London apartment in this period. Gysin would later note that Mick Jagger was referring to Grady when he sang "I know you think you are the queen of the underground" in his song Dead Flowers.

Andy Warhol made several films in Grady's Central Park West apartment including Lupe and The Closet.

During the 1960s and 1970s, Grady was known not only for her parties but also for her generosity towards writers and especially poets including Herbert Huncke, and Ed Sanders' avant-garde magazine Fuck You: A Magazine of the Arts.

On July 17, 1967 Grady gave what turned out to be her last party in New York. In October of that year she met the poet and painter Philip O'Connor, and within weeks they traveled together to France. She would live with him for more than 30 years until his death in 1998.

In a conversation shared in Andrew Barrow's 2022 book, she is quoted as saying "I had as much as Peggy Guggenheim at the beginning, but Peggy Guggenheim bought paintings and I paid to publish books."

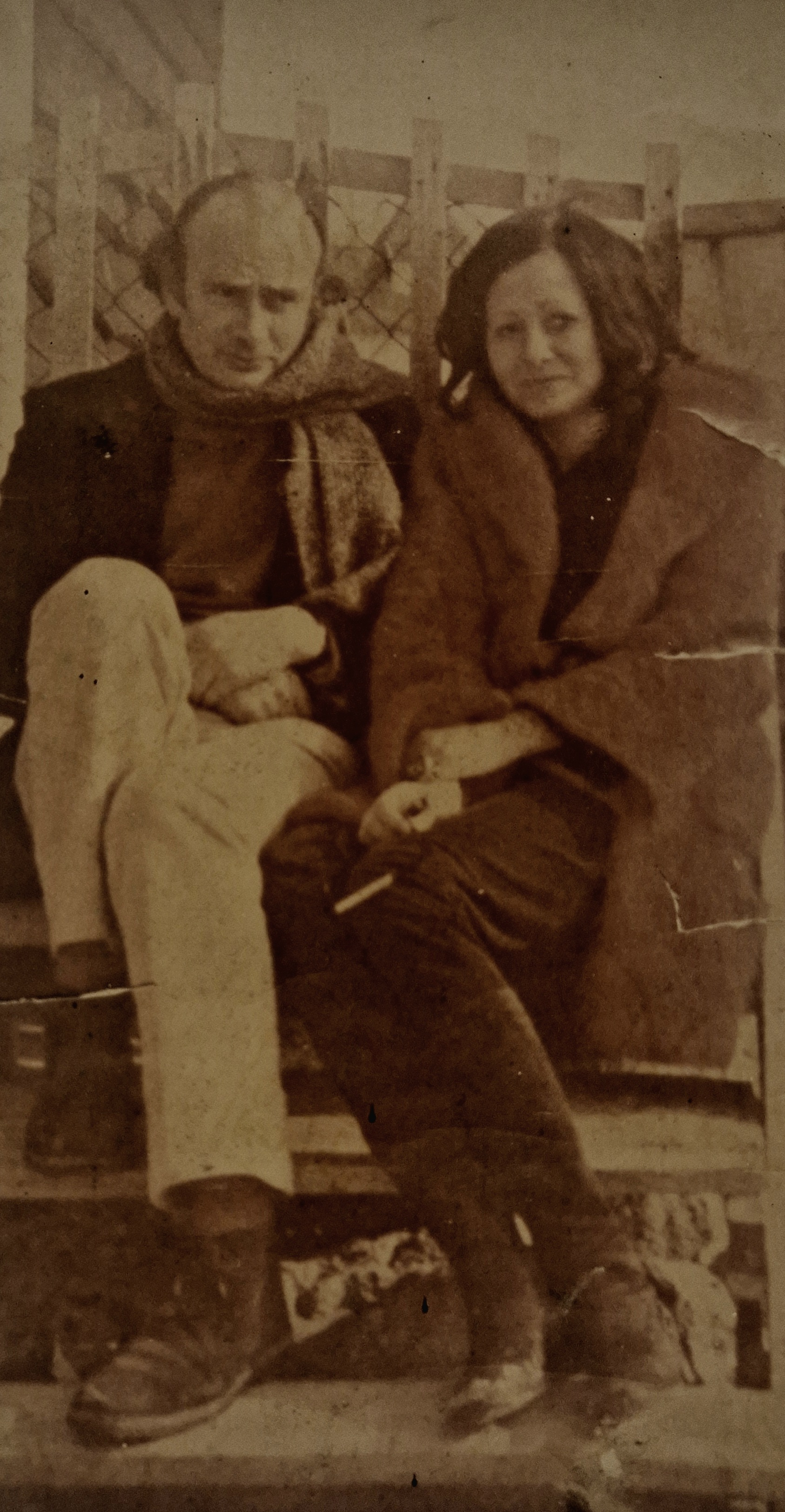
Philip O'Connor and Panna Grady in Wimereux (1970)

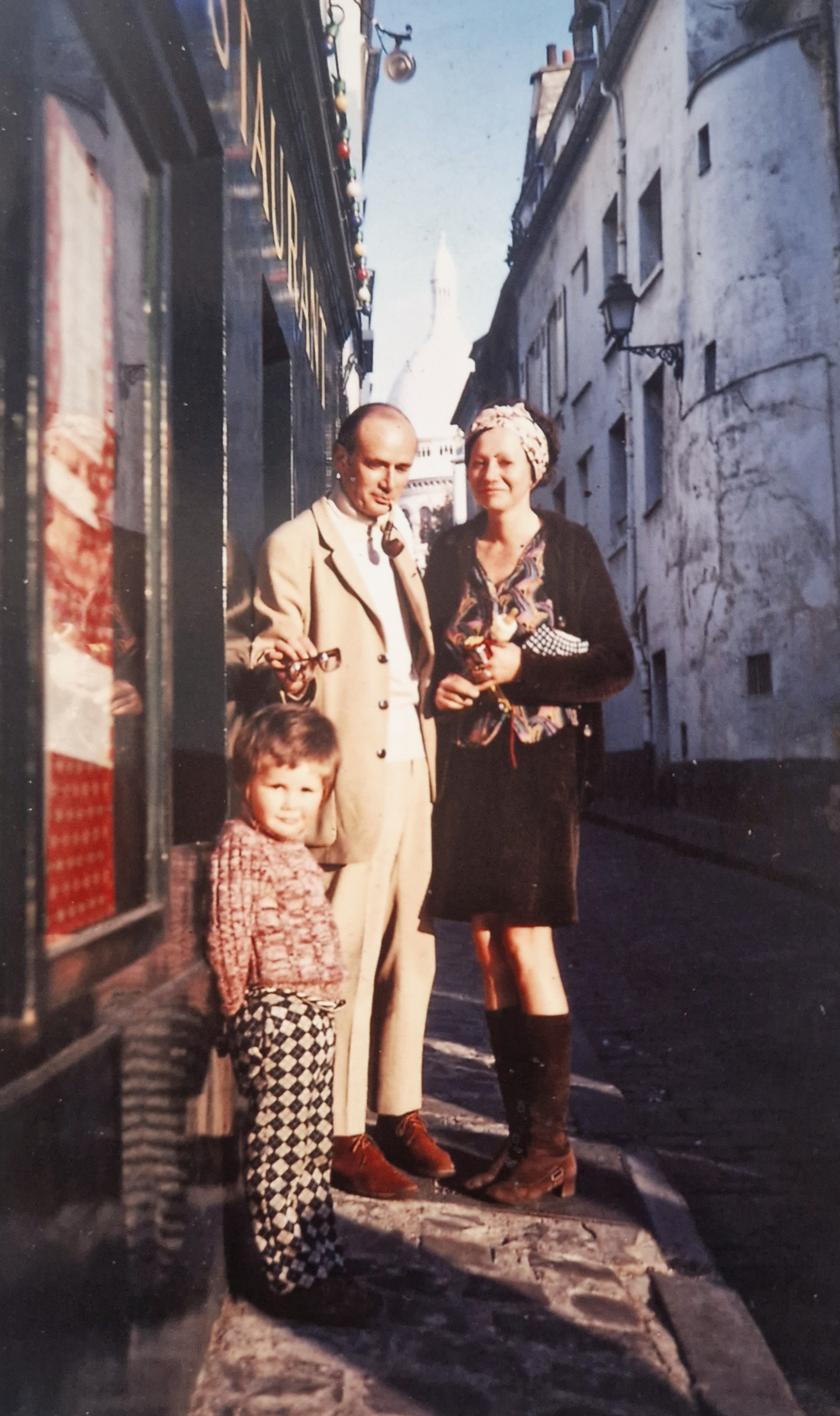
Philip O'Connor, Panna Grady and Maxim in Paris (1972)
