= Andrew Barrow =

British journalist and author

Andrew Barrow (born 11 May 1945, in Lancaster, England) is a British journalist and author. His The Tap Dancer won the 1993 Hawthornden Prize and the McKitterick Prize for the best first novel by an author aged over 40.

== List of works ==
- Gossip: A History of High Society from 1920 to 1970 (Hamish Hamilton, 1978)
- The Flesh is Weak: An Intimate History of the Church of England (Hamish Hamilton, 1980)
- International Gossip: A History of High Society from 1970 to 1980 (Hamish Hamilton, 1983)
- The Gossip Family Handbook (Hamish Hamilton, 1984)
- The Great Book of Small Talk (Fourth Estate, 1987)
- The Tap Dancer (Duckworth, 1992)
- The Man in the Moon (Macmillan, 1996)
- Quentin and Philip: A Double Portrait (Macmillan, 2002)
- Animal Magic. A Brother's Story (Jonathan Cape, 2011)
- The Great Book of Mobile Talk (Square Peg, 2013)
