= The Naked Civil Servant (book) =

1968 autobiography of Quentin Crisp

- First edition cover
- Author: Quentin Crisp
- Language: English
- Genre: Autobiography
- Publisher: Jonathan Cape
- Publication date: 1968
- Publication place: United Kingdom
- Media type: Print (Hardback & Paperback)
- Pages: 224 pp
- OCLC: 459647
- Followed by: How to Become A Virgin

The Naked Civil Servant is the 1968 autobiography of British gay icon Quentin Crisp, adapted into a 1975 film of the same name starring John Hurt.

The book began as a 1964 radio interview with Crisp conducted by his friend and fellow eccentric Philip O'Connor. A managing director at Jonathan Cape heard the interview and commissioned the publication. Having sold only 3,500 copies when first released, the book became a success when it was republished following the television movie broadcast.

The book contains many anecdotes about Crisp's life from childhood to middle age, including troubles he faced while refusing to hide his homosexuality and flamboyant lifestyle during a time when such behaviour was criminalized in the United Kingdom. Crisp also recalls various jobs including book designer, nude model, and prostitute.

The title derives from Crisp's quip about being an art model: employed by art colleges, models are ultimately paid by the Department for Education. They are essentially civil employees who are naked during office hours.
