= Hector Ross =

Scottish actor (1914–1980)

- in Bonnie Prince Charlie (1948)
- Born: 11 February 1914; Tain, Scotland
- Died: 26 November 1980 (aged 66); London, England
- Occupation: Actor
- Years active: 1927–1980

Hector Ross (1914–1980) was a Scottish stage, film and television actor.

== Partial filmography ==
- Night Beat (1947) – Don Brady
- Bonnie Prince Charlie (1948) – Glenaladale
- The Man Who Disappeared (1951) – Dr. Watson
- Happy Go Lovely (1951) – Harold
- I'm a Stranger (1952) – Inspector Craddock
- Deadly Nightshade (1953) – Canning
- The Steel Key (1953) – Beroni
- Ben-Hur (1959) – Officer (uncredited)
- The Fur Collar (1962) – Roger Harding
- Stranglehold (1962)
- Delayed Flight (1964) – Styles
- Ring of Spies (1964) – Supt. Woods

=== Television roles ===
- Trial (1971) - Taper
- Father Brown (1974) – Doctor
- Murder Most English (1977) – Marcus Gwill
