= David Thomson (writer) =

Writer and radio producer (1914–1988)

David Thomson (1914–1988) was a writer and BBC producer. He was known for radio documentaries as well as writing children's books, memoirs and novels.

== Early life ==
David Robert Alexander Thomson was born in British colonial India to Scottish parents. His father served in the Indian Army and was wounded in the Great War. As a child, Thomson lived in Scotland, as well as in Derbyshire and London, where he attended University College School. At the age of eleven, he sustained an eye injury which nearly blinded him. Unable to continue at school, he was sent to the home of his maternal grandmother in Nairn, Scotland, where he was taught by private tutors. At fourteen, Thomson returned to London and the progressive King Alfred School, London to complete his schooling. As an undergraduate he studied Modern History at Lincoln College, Oxford. At this time he also started to tutor a daughter of an Anglo-Irish family, the Kirkwoods, at Woodbrook House in County Roscommon, Ireland.

== Career ==
From 1943 to 1969, Thomson worked for the BBC as a writer and producer of radio documentaries. Many of these programmes, which covered a range of topics in natural history of peoples and places also found a place in his written work, for example The People of the Sea (1954), on the lore and life of the grey seal in the coastal rural communities of Ireland and Scotland. In 1953-4 he was seconded to UNESCO to produce radio programmes in France, Liberia and Turkey. In 1964 and 1965, Thomson was the producer of the first three iterations of Inventions for Radio on BBC's Third Programme. In 1952, David Thomson married Martina Mayne. They had three sons.

Among his most notable works are three memoirs: Woodbrook (1974), reflecting a ten-year period from 1932 when he visited Ireland regularly, tutoring Phoebe Kirkwood; In Camden Town (1983), describing his life and neighbours in London in the 1950s and 60's; and Nairn in Darkness and Light (1987), where he revisits his childhood years spent in his mother's mother's home in Scotland. In each of these books, his fine style, elegiac but never sentimental, incorporates vivid historical sketches. His acute and sympathetic approach in seeking the voice of the 'common man', whether in an urban or a rural setting, recalls the poetic documentary approach pioneered in film by John Grierson.

== Bibliography ==
- The People of the Sea (non-fiction), 1954
- Daniel (novel), 1962
- Break in the Sun (novel), 1965
- Danny Fox (children's story), 1966
- Danny Fox meets a stranger (children's story), 1968
- The Leaping Hare (non fiction with George Ewart Evans), 1972, 'another classic beast-book'.
- Woodbrook (memoir), 1974
- Danny Fox at the Palace (children's story), 1976
- The Irish Journals of Elizabeth Smith; 1840–1850.
- In Camden Town (memoir), 1983.
- Dandiprat's Days (novel), 1983
- Ronan and other stories (children's stories), 1984
- Nairn in Darkness and Light (memoir), 1987. Awarded the McVitie's Prize for Scottish writer of the year in 1987, and (posthumously) the NCR Book Award for nonfiction in 1988.

Thomson's papers, including BBC scripts and correspondence, are held by the National Library of Scotland.
