= John Hurt =

English actor (1940–2017)

Sir John Hurt CBE
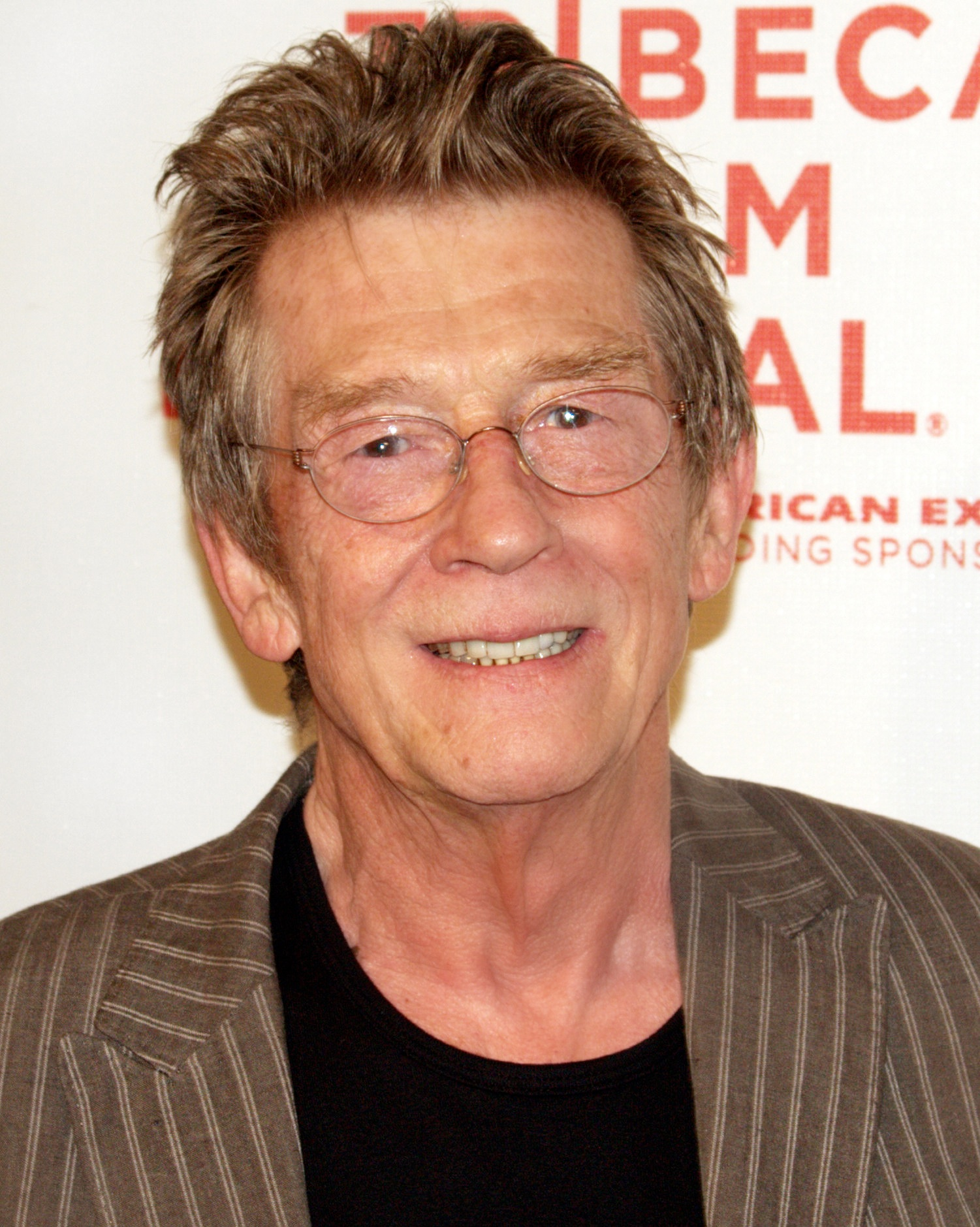
- Hurt in 2009
- Born: John Vincent Hurt; 22 January 1940; Chesterfield, Derbyshire, England
- Died: 25 January 2017 (aged 77); Cromer, Norfolk, England
- Education: Saint Martin's School of Art; Royal Academy of Dramatic Art
- Occupation: Actor
- Years active: 1961–2017
- Works: Full list
- Spouses: Annette Robertson (m. 1962; div. 1964); Donna Peacock (m. 1984; div. 1990); Joan Dalton (m. 1990; div. 1996); Anwen Rees-Myers (m. 2005)
- Partners: Marie-Lise Volpeliere-Pierrot (1967–1983; her death); Sarah Owens (1995–2002)
- Children: 2

Sir John Vincent Hurt (22 January 1940 – 25 January 2017) was an English actor. Regarded as one of the finest actors of his generation and described as having the "most distinctive voice in Britain", he was referred to by David Lynch as "simply the greatest actor in the world". Hurt's career spanned more than five decades. During that time, he was the recipient of numerous accolades, including four BAFTAs and a Golden Globe, in addition to nominations for two Academy Awards. He was knighted in 2015 for services to drama.

Hurt graduated from the Royal Academy of Dramatic Art in 1962. He appeared in a handful of films before obtaining his breakthrough role, as Richard Rich in the Academy Award winning film A Man for All Seasons (1966), a few years later. It was in the mid-1970s that his career really took off. After a highly acclaimed performance alongside Richard Attenborough and Judy Geeson in 10 Rillington Place (1971), receiving a nomination for the British Academy Television Award for Best Supporting Actor, he then won the British Academy Television Award for Best Actor for The Naked Civil Servant (1975), and played Caligula in the BBC TV series I, Claudius (1976). Hurt earned Academy Award nominations for Best Supporting Actor for Midnight Express (1978), and for Best Actor for The Elephant Man (1980). Other films he had large roles in include Alien (1979), Heaven's Gate (1980), Nineteen Eighty-Four (1984), White Mischief (1987), Scandal (1989), The Field (1990), King Ralph (1991), Rob Roy (1995), and Contact (1997).

Hurt gained further prominence portraying Garrick Ollivander in the Harry Potter film series (2001–11), as well as appearing in the 2004 and 2008 Hellboy films, V for Vendetta (2005), Indiana Jones and the Kingdom of the Crystal Skull (2008), Outlander (2008), and Snowpiercer (2013). He also acted in the acclaimed films Melancholia (2011), Tinker Tailor Soldier Spy (2011), Only Lovers Left Alive (2013) and Jackie (2016). He reprised his role as Quentin Crisp in An Englishman in New York (2009), which brought his seventh BAFTA nomination. He portrayed an incarnation of the Doctor known as the War Doctor in Doctor Who, a role he later reprised in audio dramas for Big Finish Productions. He voiced roles in Watership Down (1978), The Lord of the Rings (1978), The Plague Dogs (1982), The Black Cauldron (1985), Dogville (2003), Valiant (2005), Merlin (2008–2012), The Gruffalo's Child (2011), and Thomas & Friends: Sodor's Legend of the Lost Treasure (2015), and narrated the BBC documentary series Human Planet and Planet Dinosaur.

== Life and career ==
=== Early years and education ===
John Vincent Hurt was born on 22 January 1940, in Chesterfield, Derbyshire, the son of Arnould Herbert Hurt (1904–1999) and Phyllis (née Massey; 1907–1975). His father had been a mathematician, but became a Church of England clergyman and served as vicar of Holy Trinity Church in Shirebrook, Derbyshire; his mother, a one-time actress, became "the first female draughtsman" at Metropolitan-Vickers in Manchester. In 1937, Hurt's father moved his family to Derbyshire, where he became Perpetual Curate of Holy Trinity Church. When Hurt was five, his father became the vicar of St Stephen's Church in Woodville, Derbyshire, and remained there until 1953.

At the age of eight, Hurt was sent to the Anglican St Michael's Preparatory School in Otford, Kent, where he eventually developed his passion for acting. He decided he wanted to become an actor after his first role as a girl in a school production of The Blue Bird by Maurice Maeterlinck. Hurt stated that a senior master at the school, Donald Cormack, would abuse him and others by removing his two false front teeth and putting his tongue in the boys' mouths, as well as rubbing their faces with his stubble, and that the experience affected him hugely. Hurt, aged 12, became a boarder at Lincoln School (then a grammar school) because he had failed the entrance examination for admission to his brother's school. His headmaster at Lincoln School laughed when Hurt told him he wanted to be an actor, telling him, "Well, you may be alright in school plays but you wouldn't stand a chance in the profession."

In 1952 Hurt's father moved to St Aidan's Church in Cleethorpes, Lincolnshire. In a Guardian interview Hurt states the family lived in a vicarage opposite a cinema, but he was not allowed to go there, as films were "frowned upon." However, watching theatre was considered "fine" and encouraged particularly by his mother, who took him regularly to the repertory theatre in Cleethorpes. His parents disliked his later acting ambitions and encouraged him to become an art teacher instead. Aged 17, Hurt enrolled in Grimsby Art School (now the East Coast School of Art and Design), where he studied art. In 1959, he won a scholarship allowing him to study for an Art Teacher's Diploma at Saint Martin's School of Art in London. Despite the scholarship, paying his tuition fees and living expenses was difficult, so he persuaded some of his friends to pose naked and sold the portraits. In 1960, he won a scholarship to Royal Academy of Dramatic Art, where he trained for two years, graduating in 1962 with an Acting (RADA Diploma).

=== 1962–1975 ===
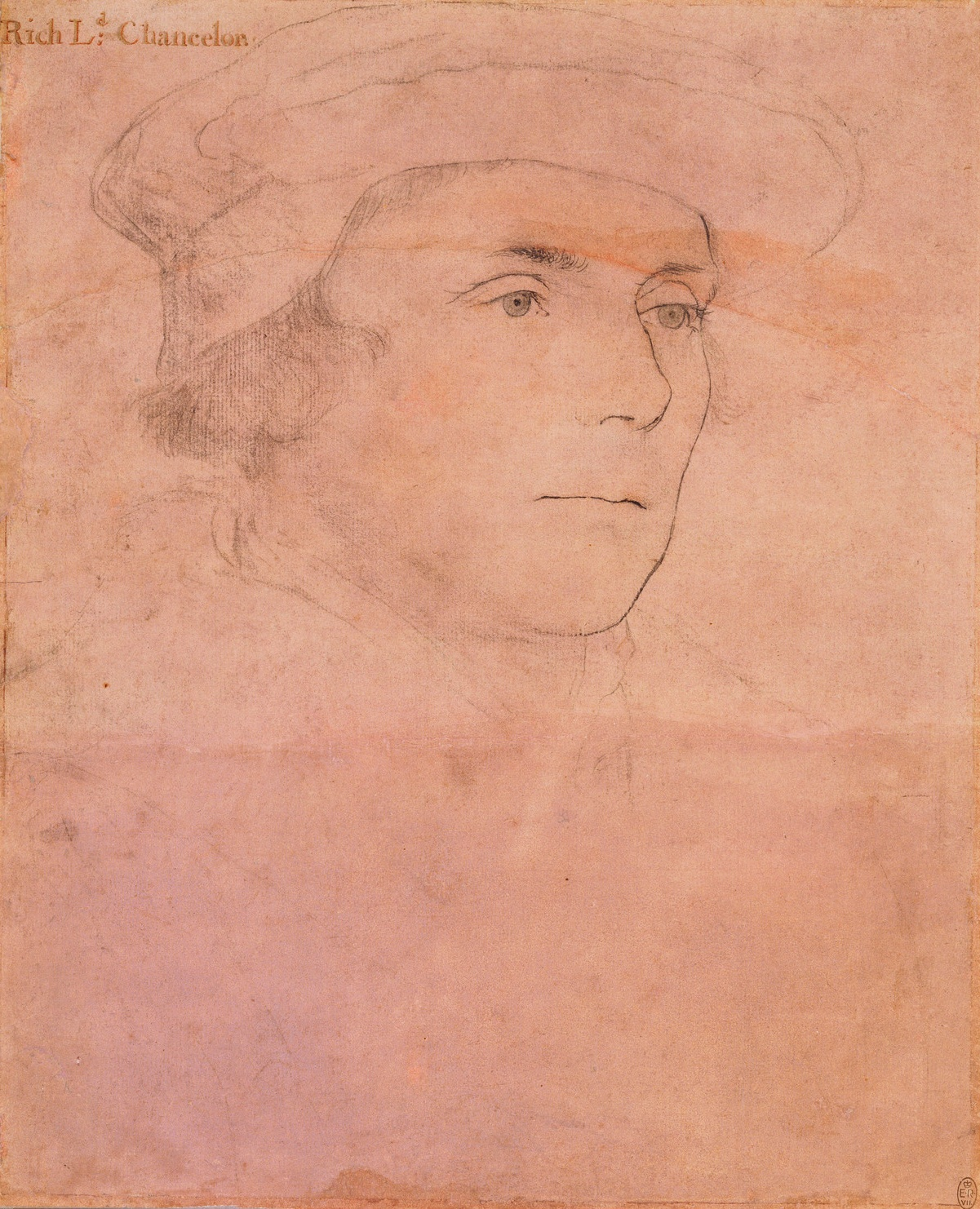
Hurt portrayed Sir Richard Rich in A Man for All Seasons (1966)

Hurt's first film role was as Phil Corbett in the Ralph Thomas directed British romantic drama The Wild and the Willing (1962). Hurt starred alongside Virginia Maskell and Paul Rogers. In 1963 he acted in the Kitchen sink drama This Is My Street. The following year he appeared in the television series Gideon's Way episode: The Tin God (1964) as prison escapee Freddy Tisdale.

Hurt's first major role was as Richard Rich in the Fred Zinnemann directed historical drama film A Man for All Seasons (1966). Hurt acted alongside Paul Scofield, Wendy Hiller, Orson Welles, Robert Shaw, Susannah York, and Vanessa Redgrave. The film received critical acclaim and six Academy Awards including Best Picture. Hurt then acted in the British romantic drama The Sailor from Gibraltar starring Jeanne Moreau directed by Tony Richardson. He then starred in John Huston's raunchy adventure comedy Sinful Davey (1969) which critics compared to the film Tom Jones. That same year he acted in the British war film Before Winter Comes opposite David Niven and the drama In Search of Gregory alongside Julie Christie.

He then played Timothy Evans, who was hanged for murders committed by his landlord John Christie, in 10 Rillington Place (1971), earning him his first BAFTA nomination for Best Supporting Actor. His portrayal of Quentin Crisp in the TV play The Naked Civil Servant (1975) gave him prominence and earned him the British Academy Television Award for Best Actor. The following year, Hurt appeared as Anthony John Grey, a crooked computer programming expert in The Sweeney episode Tomorrow Man.

=== 1976–1980 ===
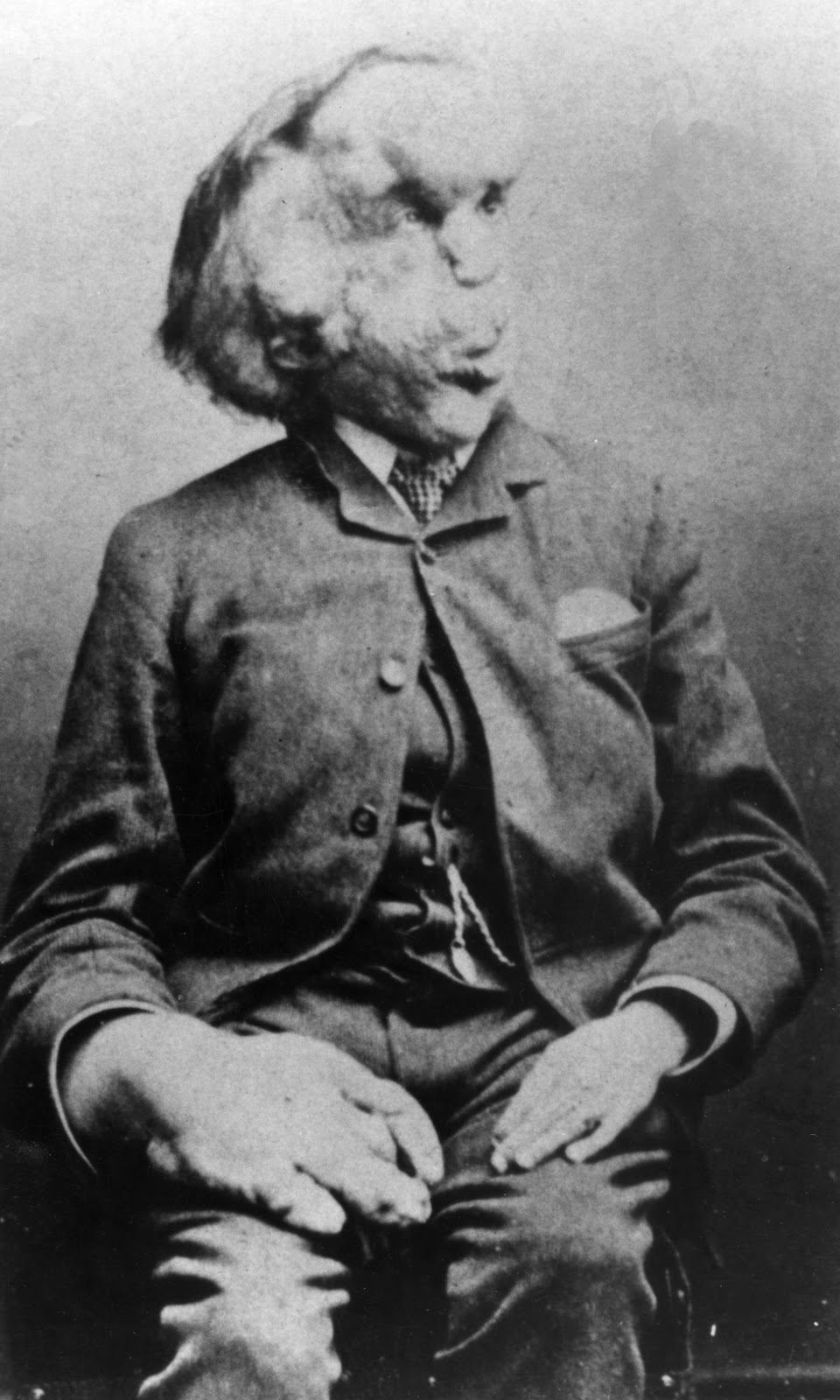
Hurt portrayed Joseph Merrick in The Elephant Man (1980)

He won further acclaim for his bravura performance as the Roman emperor Caligula in the BBC drama serial I, Claudius (1976). In a much later documentary about the series, I Claudius: A Television Epic (2002), Hurt revealed that he had originally declined the role when it was first offered to him, but that series director Herbert Wise had invited him to a special pre-production party, hoping Hurt would change his mind, and that he was so impressed by meeting the rest of the cast and crew that he reversed his decision and took the role.

Hurt appeared in the 1978 film Midnight Express, for which he won a Golden Globe and a BAFTA and was nominated for an Academy Award for Best Supporting Actor (the latter of which he lost to Christopher Walken for his performance in The Deer Hunter). Around the same time, he lent his voice to Ralph Bakshi's animated film adaptation of The Lord of the Rings, playing the role of Aragorn. Hurt voiced Hazel, the heroic rabbit leader of his warren in the film adaptation of Watership Down (both 1978) and later played the major villain, General Woundwort, in the animated television series version.

His other roles in the 1970s and the beginning of the 1980s included Kane, the first victim of the title creature in the Ridley Scott directed film Alien (1979). He reprised the role as a parody in Spaceballs. In 1980 he portrayed the deformed Joseph Merrick in David Lynch's biographical drama film The Elephant Man (1980). Hurt starred alongside Anthony Hopkins, John Gielgud, and Anne Bancroft. Peter Bradshaw of The Guardian praised his performance writing, "John Hurt, in complex and intricate prosthetics, plays Merrick with an unforgettably distinctive, gentle, quavering voice". He won another the BAFTA Award for Best Actor in a Leading Role. He was also nominated for the Academy Award for Best Actor and the Golden Globe Award for Best Actor – Motion Picture Drama.

That same year he starred in Michael Cimino's epic Western Heaven's Gate starring Kris Kristofferson, Christopher Walken, and Sam Waterston. The following year he portrayed Jesus Christ in the Mel Brooks comedy film History of the World, Part I (1981). Also in 1981 he starred in Delbert Mann's thriller Night Crossing (1981). He earned the Evening Standard British Film Award for Best Actor for his performances as Bob Champion in the sports drama Champions (1984), Mitchell Braddock in the crime thriller The Hit (1984), and Winston Smith in Nineteen Eighty-Four (1984). He also played the would-be art school radical Scrawdyke in Little Malcolm (1974).

=== 1981–1999 ===
Hurt also had a starring role in Sam Peckinpah's critically panned but moderately successful final film, The Osterman Weekend (1983). Also in this period, he starred as the Fool opposite Laurence Olivier's King in King Lear (1983). Hurt also appeared as Raskolnikov in a BBC television adaptation of Crime and Punishment (1979).

Hurt voiced Snitter in The Plague Dogs, played Winston Smith in the film adaptation of George Orwell's novel Nineteen Eighty-Four (1984) and starred in Disney's The Black Cauldron (1985), voicing the film's main antagonist, the Horned King. Hurt provided the voiceover for AIDS: Iceberg/Tombstone, a 1986 public information film warning of the dangers of AIDS, and played the title role, the on-screen narrator, in Jim Henson's television series The StoryTeller (1988). Hurt appeared in the 1987 Bob Clark-directed movie From the Hip.

He had a supporting role as "Bird" O'Donnell in Jim Sheridan's film The Field (1990), which garnered him another BAFTA nomination. In this film, Hurt starred alongside Richard Harris who earned a nomination for the Academy Award for Best Actor. In King Ralph (1991) Hurt played Lord Percival Graves. Hurt portrayed James Graham, 1st Duke of Montrose in the historical drama Rob Roy opposite Liam Neeson, Jessica Lange and Tim Roth. That same year he acted in the Jim Jarmusch directed Western Dead Man starring Johnny Depp, and Walter Hill's Western Wild Bill (1995) with Jeff Bridges.

In 1997 he starred in Richard Kwietniowski's Love and Death on Long Island for which he was nominated for the BIFA for Best Performance by an Actor in a British Independent Film. He was cast as the reclusive tycoon S. R. Hadden in Contact (1997). During this time, Hurt provided narration on the British musical group Art of Noise's concept album The Seduction of Claude Debussy and narrated a four-part TV series The Universe (1999).

=== 2000–2017 ===
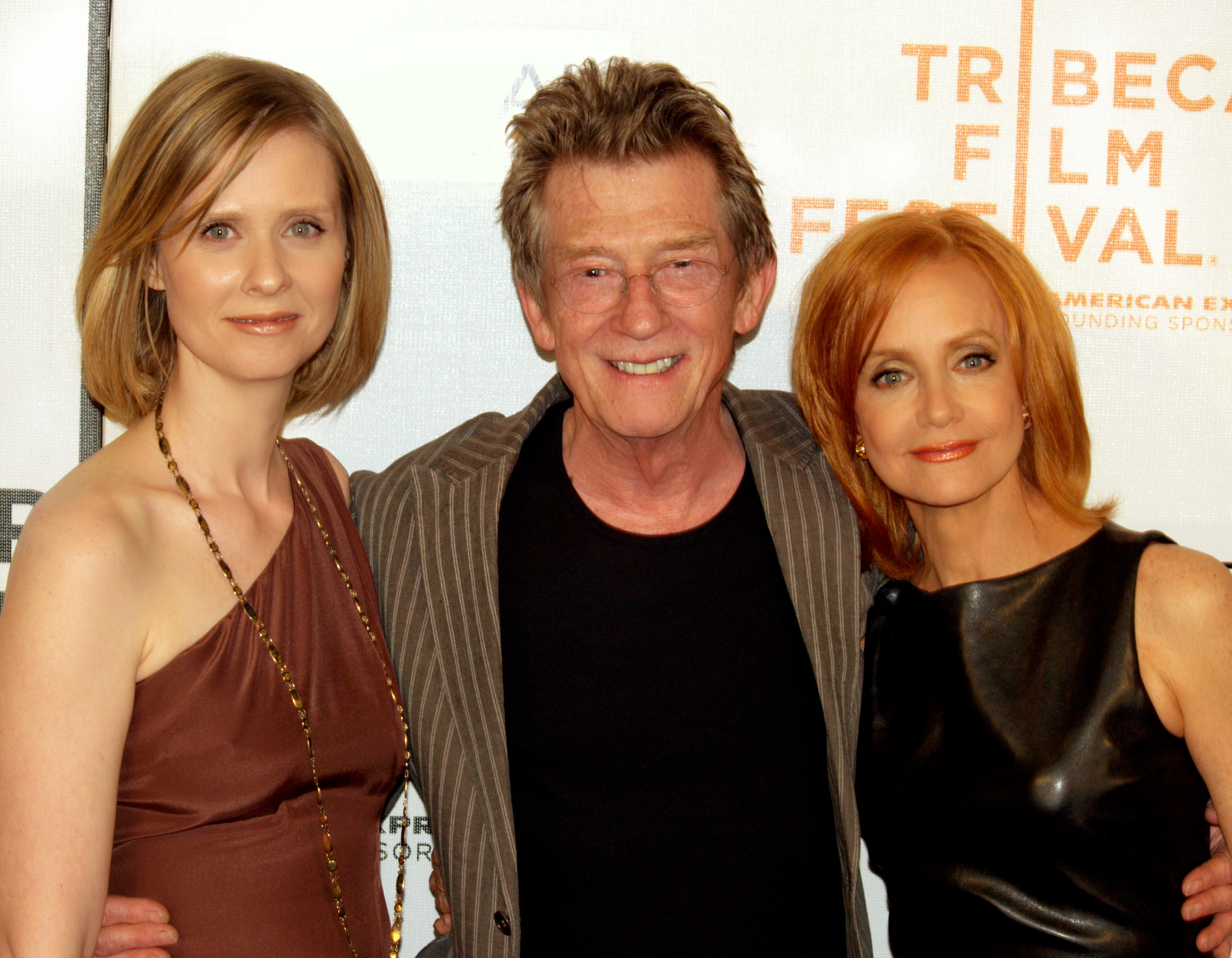
Cynthia Nixon, Hurt and Swoosie Kurtz in 2009

In the first Harry Potter film, Harry Potter and the Philosopher's Stone (2001), he played Mr Ollivander, the wand-maker. He returned for the adaptation of Harry Potter and the Goblet of Fire, though his scenes in that film were cut. He also returned for Harry Potter and the Deathly Hallows Part 1 and Part 2. In the 2006 film V for Vendetta, he played the role of Adam Sutler, leader of the Norsefire fascist dictatorship and in Steven Spielberg's Indiana Jones and the Kingdom of the Crystal Skull (2008) he appeared as Harold Oxley.

He voiced the Great Dragon Kilgharrah, who aids the young warlock Merlin as he protects the future King Arthur, in the BBC television series Merlin (also 2008). In 2011, he narrated the BBC documentary Planet Dinosaur, a dinosaur-centered documentary completely shown through CGI.

More than thirty years after The Naked Civil Servant, Hurt reprised the role of Quentin Crisp in the 2009 film An Englishman in New York. This television film depicts Crisp's later years in New York. He returned to Orwell's Nineteen Eighty-Four, playing the on-screen Big Brother for the Paper Zoo Theatre Company's stage adaptation of the novel in June 2009. The theatre production premiered at the National Media Museum, in Bradford and toured in 2010. Hurt said, "I think Paper Zoo thought it would be quite ironic to have the person who played Winston having risen in the party. From the Chestnut Tree Cafe, he's managed to get his wits together again, now understanding that 2 and 2 make 5, and becomes Big Brother. So it tickled my fancy, and of course, I looked up Paper Zoo, and they seem to me to be the sort of company that's essential in the country as we know it, and doing a lot of really good stuff."

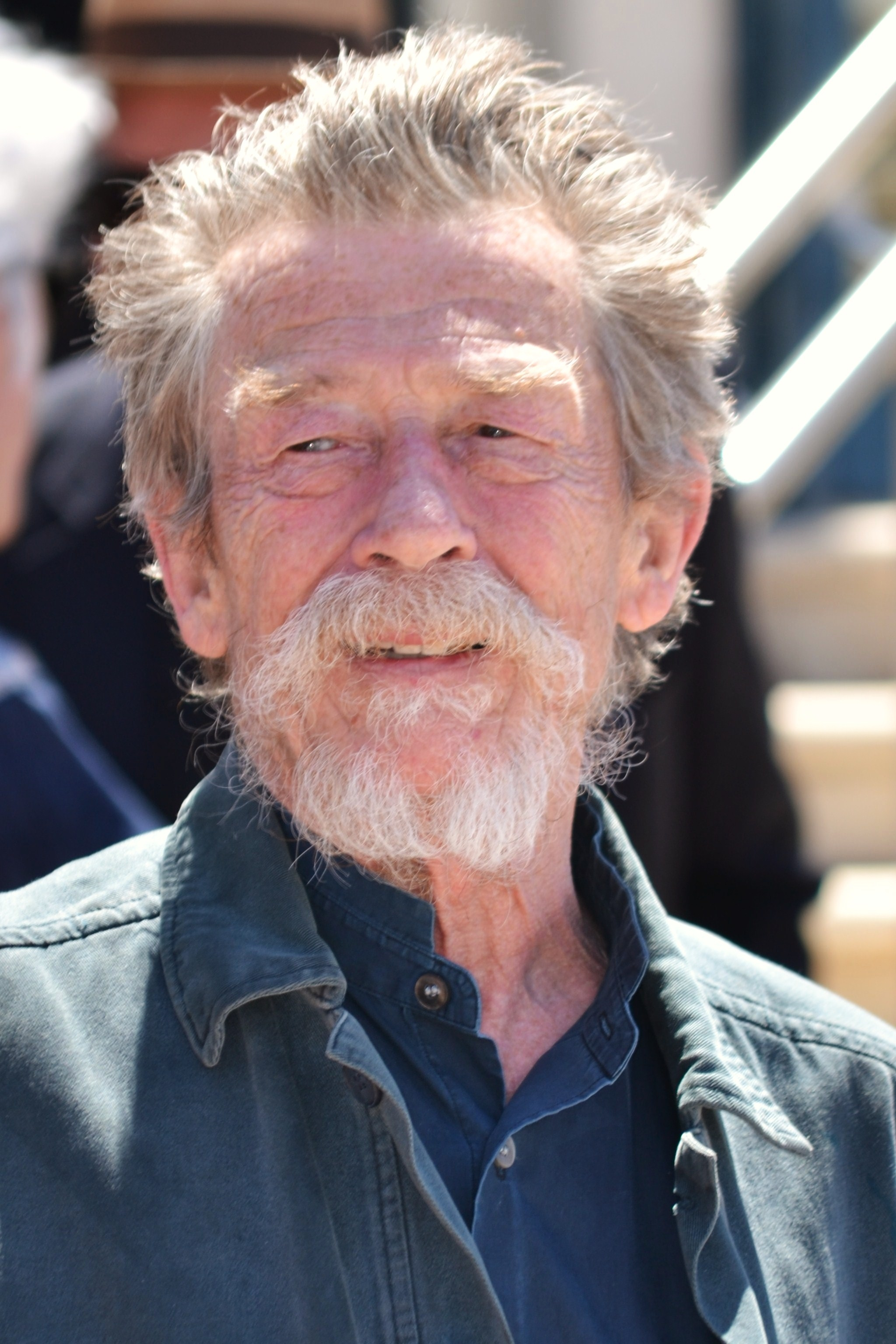
Hurt at the 2013 Cannes Film Festival

At the 65th British Academy Film Awards Hurt won the award for Outstanding British Contribution to Cinema. In 2013, Hurt first appeared in the Doctor Who episode "The Name of the Doctor" as an unplaced incarnation of the Doctor. His character is named as the War Doctor in the mini-episode "The Night of the Doctor"; his character is given focus in the 50th anniversary episode "The Day of the Doctor", He reprised the role on audio for Big Finish Productions in a series of audio stories starting from 2015 to 2017, completing twelve episodes over four box sets. He also played the title character in an audio drama adaptation of The Invisible Man for the company, for which he was nominated for a BBC Audio Drama Award.

During Terry Gilliam's eighth attempt at making his development hell project The Man Who Killed Don Quixote, Hurt was set to star as Don Quixote alongside Adam Driver. However, his declining health and eventual death led the project to be cancelled yet again; he was eventually replaced by Jonathan Pryce.

Hurt was due to appear alongside Ben Kingsley in a film entitled Broken Dream, to be directed by Neil Jordan. In 2015, Hurt guest stars as the voice of Sailor John, the main antagonist in the Thomas & Friends film Sodor's Legend of the Lost Treasure along with Eddie Redmayne (Ryan) and Jamie Campbell Bower (Skiff). At the time of his death he had completed filming That Good Night, in which he played a terminally ill writer. Hurt was initially cast as Neville Chamberlain in Darkest Hour. However, according to Gary Oldman, Hurt was undergoing treatment for pancreatic cancer, and dropped the role in pre-production; actor Ronald Pickup assumed the role of Chamberlain instead.

=== Personal life ===
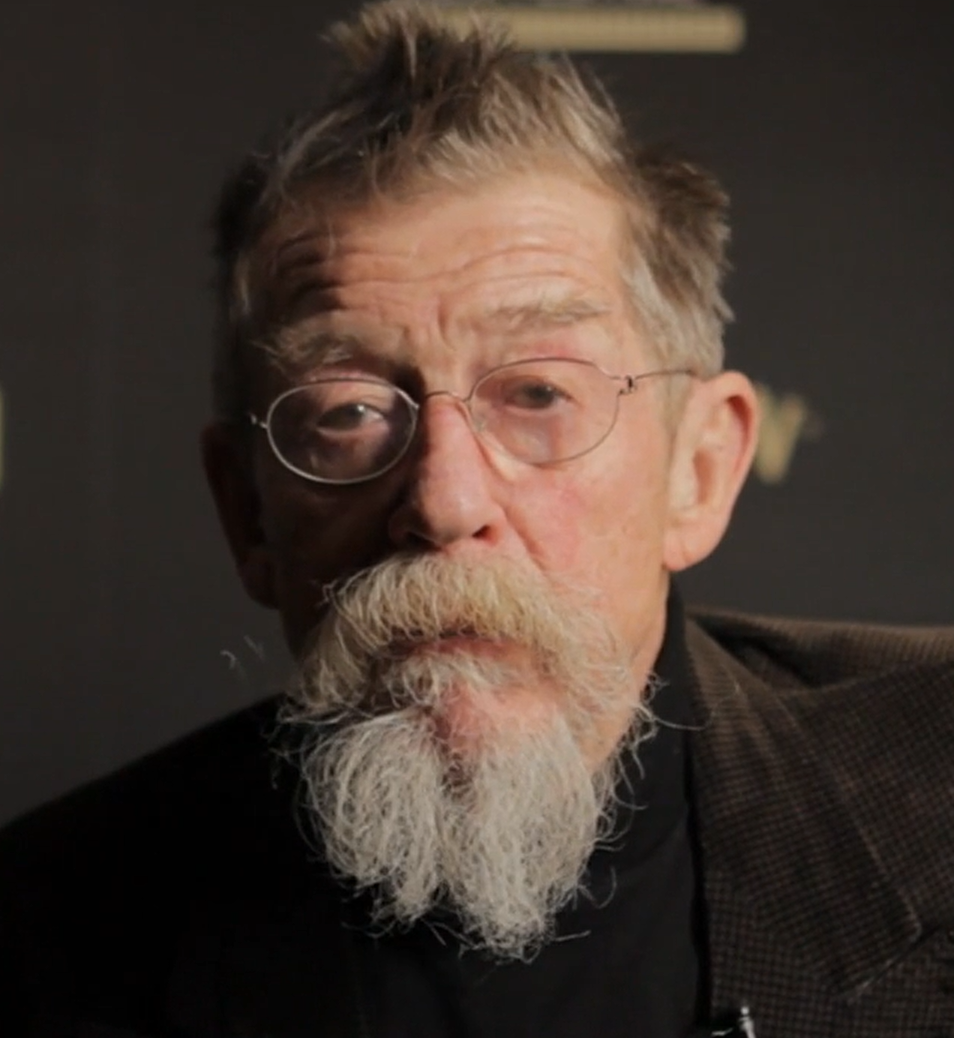
Hurt in 2014

Hurt had an older brother, Brother Anselm (born Michael Hurt in 1932), a Roman Catholic convert who became a monk and writer at Glenstal Abbey after moving there in 1996; Hurt contributed to his brother's books. In early 2012, Anselm, now retired, was arrested over child abuse allegations that took place in the late 1960s while he was working at a boarding school in Bath, Somerset. Anselm died in 2023.

Hurt also had an adopted sister, Monica. She is mentioned in accounts of John Hurt's upbringing and his brother's move to Catholicism. Monica died from variant CJD in 2005.

In 1962, Hurt's father left his parish in Cleethorpes to become headmaster of St Michael's College in the Central American country of British Honduras. Hurt's mother died in 1975, and his father died in 1999 at the age of 95.

In 1962, Hurt married actress Annette Robertson. The marriage ended in 1964. In 1967, he began his longest relationship with Marie-Lise Volpeliere-Pierrot, a French model. The couple had planned to get married after 15 years together. On 26 January 1983, Hurt and Volpeliere-Pierrot went horse riding early in the morning near their house in Ascott-under-Wychwood, Oxfordshire; Volpeliere-Pierrot was thrown from her horse. She fell into a coma and died later that day.

In September 1984, Hurt married Donna Peacock, an American actress, at a local Register Office. The couple divorced in January 1990.

On 24 January 1990, Hurt married Joan Dalton, an American production assistant, whom he had met while filming Scandal. With her, he had two sons. This marriage ended in 1996 and was followed by a seven-year relationship with Sarah Owens, a Dublin-born presenter and writer. The couple moved to County Wicklow, where they settled close to their friends, director John Boorman and Claddagh Records founder and Guinness heir Garech Browne. In July 2002, the couple separated. In March 2005, Hurt married his fourth wife, Anwen Rees-Meyers, an advertising film producer. He gave up smoking and drinking during his fourth marriage. He lived in Cromer, Norfolk.

In 2007, Hurt took part in the BBC genealogical television series Who Do You Think You Are?, which investigated part of his family history. Prior to the programme, Hurt had harboured a love of Ireland and was enamoured of a "deeply beguiling" family legend that suggested his great-grandmother had been the illegitimate daughter of a Marquess of Sligo. The genealogical evidence uncovered seemed to contradict the family legend, rendering the suggestion doubtful. The search revealed that his great-grandmother had previously lived in Grimsby, at a location within a mile of the art college at which Hurt had been a student.

In 2016, Hurt announced he was in favour of the United Kingdom voting to remain in the EU.

=== Illness and death ===
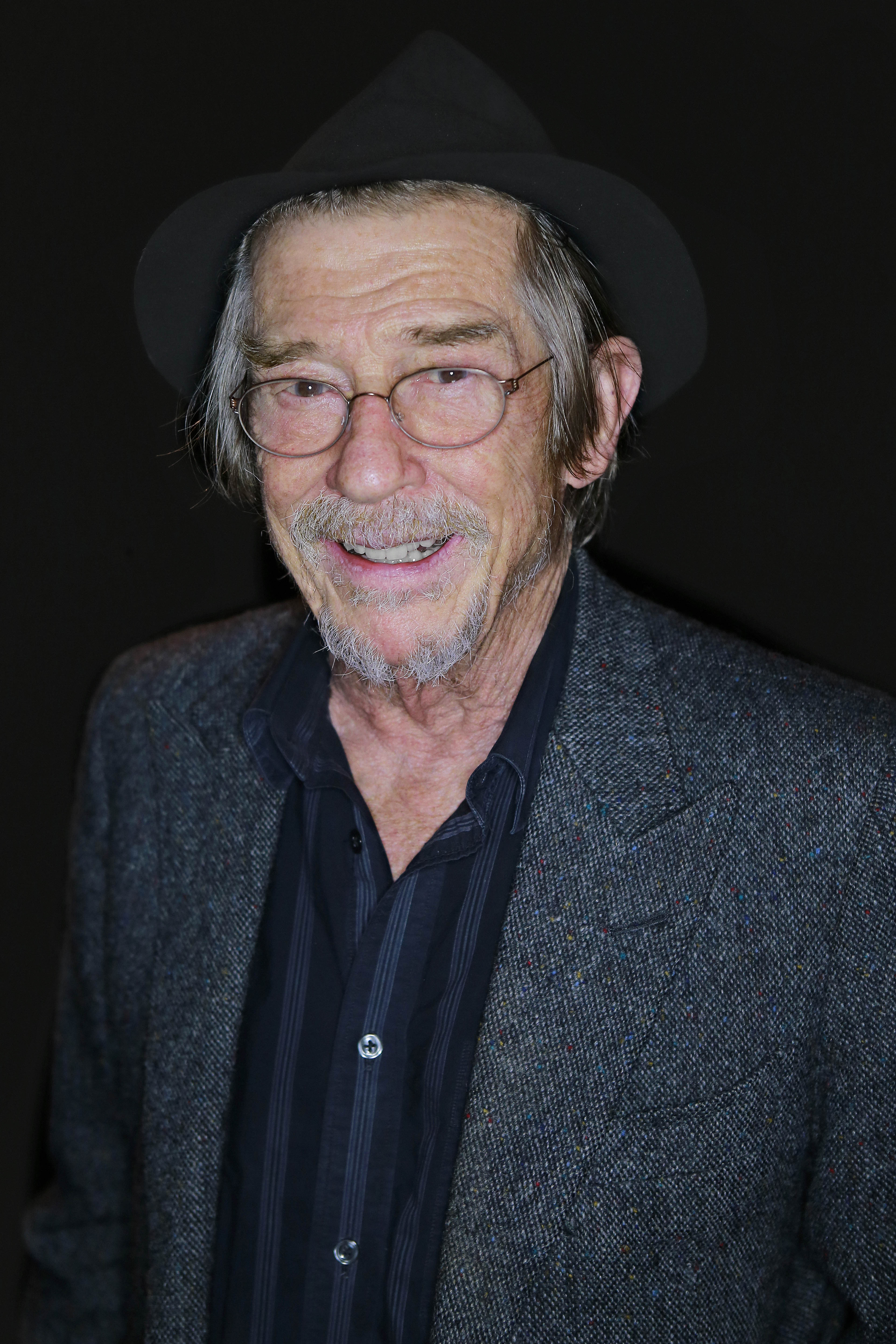
Hurt in 2015

On 16 June 2015, Hurt publicly announced that he had been diagnosed with early-stage pancreatic cancer. He confirmed that he would continue to work while undergoing treatment and said that both he and the medical team treating him were "more than optimistic about a satisfactory outcome". Following treatment, he stated that his cancer was in remission on 12 October 2015. He died at his home in Cromer, Norfolk, on 25 January 2017, at age 77.

== Acting credits and accolades ==
=== Awards and nominations ===
Year	Award	Category	Work	Result
1978	Academy Awards	Best Supporting Actor	Midnight Express	Nominated
1980	Academy Awards	Best Actor	The Elephant Man	Nominated
1978	Golden Globe Awards	Best Supporting Actor – Motion Picture	Midnight Express	Won
1980	Golden Globe Awards	Best Actor – Motion Picture Drama	The Elephant Man	Nominated
1971	BAFTA Awards	Best Supporting Actor	10 Rillington Place	Nominated
1975	BAFTA Awards	Best Actor	The Naked Civil Servant	Won
1978	BAFTA Awards	Best Supporting Actor	Midnight Express	Won
1979	BAFTA Awards	Best Supporting Actor	Alien	Nominated
1980	BAFTA Awards	Best Actor	The Elephant Man	Won
1989	BAFTA Awards	Best Supporting Actor	The Field	Nominated
2009	BAFTA Awards	Best Actor	An Englishman in New York	Nominated
2011	BAFTA Awards	BAFTA Special Award		Received

=== Honours and distinctions ===
In the 2004 Birthday Honours, Hurt was appointed a Commander of the Order of the British Empire (CBE) "for services to drama".

Hurt was awarded a Fellow of the British Film Institute in 2009. In 2012, he was among the British cultural icons selected by artist Sir Peter Blake to appear in a new version of his album cover for the Beatles' Sgt. Pepper's Lonely Hearts Club Band, to celebrate the British cultural figures of his life that he most admired. In 2014, he received the Will Award, presented by the Shakespeare Theatre Company, along with Stacy Keach and Dame Diana Rigg. The John Hurt Centre opened in September 2016 and is an education and exhibition space located at Cinema City, Norwich.

He was knighted in the 2015 New Year Honours also "for services to drama". On 17 July 2015, he attended an investiture ceremony at Windsor Castle where he received the accolade from Queen Elizabeth II.

=== Honorary academic degrees and appointments ===
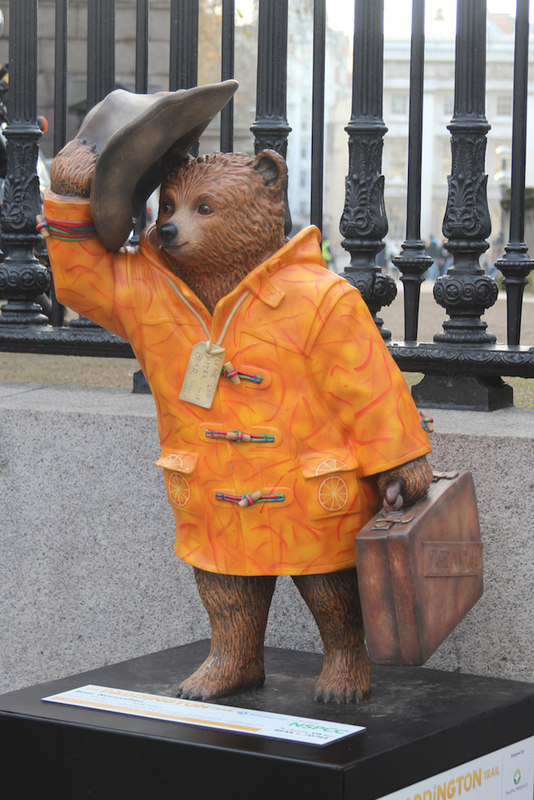
Hurt's marmalade-themed Paddington Bear statue in London, auctioned to raise funds for the NSPCC

Hurt received an Honorary Doctor of Literature (Hon.D.Litt.) degree from the University of Derby in 2002. In 2006, he received an Honorary Doctor of Letters (Hon.D.Litt.) degree from the University of Hull. In 2012, he was appointed provost of Norwich University College of the Arts, and became its first chancellor when the college became a full university in 2013. In 2013, he was given an Honorary Doctor of Arts (Hon.D.A) degree by the University of Lincoln, at Lincoln Cathedral.

=== Charity patronage ===
Since 2003, Hurt was a patron of the Proteus Syndrome Foundation, both in the United Kingdom and in the US. Proteus syndrome is the condition that Joseph Merrick, who Hurt played (renamed as John Merrick) in The Elephant Man, is thought to have suffered from, although Merrick's exact condition is still not known with certainty.

From 2006, Hurt had been a patron of Project Harar, a UK-based charity working in Ethiopia for children with facial disfigurements. Hurt was announced as patron of Norwich Cinema City in March 2013.

In 2014, Hurt designed a Paddington Bear statue which was placed outside the British Museum. It was one of fifty statues of Paddington located around London prior to the release of the film Paddington which were auctioned to raise funds for the National Society for the Prevention of Cruelty to Children (NSPCC).

== See also ==
- List of Academy Award winners and nominees from Great Britain
- List of actors with Academy Award nominations
- List of actors with more than one Academy Award nomination in the acting categories
- List of British actors
- List of Golden Globe winners
