= I'm a Stranger =

- Directed by: Brock Williams
- Written by: Brock Williams
- Produced by: Harold Richmond
- Starring: Greta Gynt; James Hayter; Hector Ross
- Cinematography: Gordon Lang
- Edited by: Gerald Thomas
- Music by: Jack Beaver
- Production company: A Corsair Production
- Distributed by: Apex Film Distributors (UK)
- Release date: July 1952 (UK)
- Running time: 60 minutes
- Country: United Kingdom
- Language: English

I'm a Stranger is a 1952 British second feature ('B') comedy film directed and written by Brock Williams and starring Greta Gynt, James Hayter and Hector Ross.

== Plot ==
Various different parties search for a missing will which leaves a fortune to a stranger from Calcutta.

== Cast ==
- Greta Gynt as herself
- James Hayter as Horatio Flowerdew
- Hector Ross as Inspector Craddock
- Jean Cadell as Hannah Mackenzie
- Patric Doonan as George Westcott
- Charles Lloyd Pack as Mr. Cringle
- Martina Mayne as Mary
- Fulton Mackay as Alastair Campbell

== Critical reception ==
The Monthly Film Bulletin wrote: "A talkative, indifferently made little thriller, in which the characters behave in a most improbable way."

Picturegoer wrote: "This run-of-the mill British crime melodrama is rescued from mediocrity by an above-average cast. Its story, which concerns a hunt for a missing will, employs all the old 'props,' but leading players Greta Gynt and James Hayter improvise effectively and enable it to spring a surprise ending."

TV Guide called the film "Amusing at times but unmemorable."

In British Sound Films: The Studio Years 1928–1959 David Quinlan rated the film as "mediocre", writing: "Very light comedy-drama; cast helps a little, not much."
