= Woodbrook House =

Country house in County Roscommon, Ireland

Woodbrook House Gates

Woodbrook House is a country house in County Roscommon in Ireland, situated in the townland of Usna in the civil parish of Tumna, three miles (5 km) from Carrick-on-Shannon, on the road to Boyle.

== History ==
The Kirkwoods were landlords in Tumna, and various members of the Kirkwood family had large landholdings in the townlands of Woodbrook, Dorrary, and Cloongownagh in 1858. James Kirkwood built Woodbrook School for the education of the children of his tenants; the family managed the school until 1911. Rev. John McDermott, P.P., Croghan became the manager of the school from 1911 until 1917.

Originally 'planted' on the Mayo-Sligo border, near Killala, the Kirkwood family is first mentioned in records in or around the time of the 1691 rebellion. How they made their way to Roscommon is unclear, but it is possible that inter-marriage brought them to Roscommon (the Lloyd surname was incorporated into their surnames at one stage). The Anglo-Irish of the time kept to themselves and rarely inter-married with the native Irish.

A family called Phibbs, who lived there, built Woodbrook House in 1780. (According to John and Mai Malone, Grehan Barlow, an historical architect from Birmingham who visited the house in the late 1990s, was of the opinion that the Phibbses had built a house at Woodbrook in 1671; this would imply an earlier structure either on or close to the site of the present house.) The original house was square and without wings, which were added in the 1880s. Little is known of the Phibbs family, other than it is likely that they were Planters.

Woodbrook House became the home of the Kirkwoods in the nineteenth century, when they bought the lands from the Phibbs family. The Kirkwood family purchased the 200-acre (0.81 km^{2}) farm at Usna on the banks of the river Boyle and later obtained the 600-acre (2.4 km^{2}) farm at Woodbrook. Their home in Usna became known as Woodbrook House. The gate and railing at the road were erected after one of the Kirkwoods' horses, also named Woodbrook, won the Grand National in 1881, ridden by Mr Tommy Beasley and trained by Henry Linde.

David Thomson's book Woodbrook gives an account of life at Woodbrook during the 1930s, when he lived there for several summers with the Kirkwood family as tutor to their daughter, Phoebe, with whom he had a platonic love affair. Micheál Ó Súilleabháin composed a piece for piano and orchestra called "Woodbrook", conceived as the soundtrack for a radio documentary called The Story of Woodbrook - David Thompson's Book, produced by Julian Vignoles, which was first transmitted on RTÉ radio in 1986.

Woodbrook House still survives as a residence but the estate has largely gone. In 1946, over fifty acres was sold to the local Carrick on Shannon Golf Club while the Land Commission subsequently divided the remainder.
