= Philip O'Connor =

British writer and surrealist poet (1916–1998)

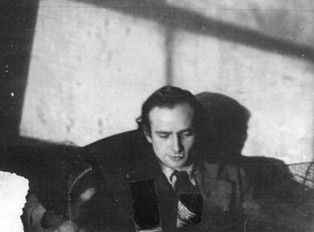
O'Connor in 1947

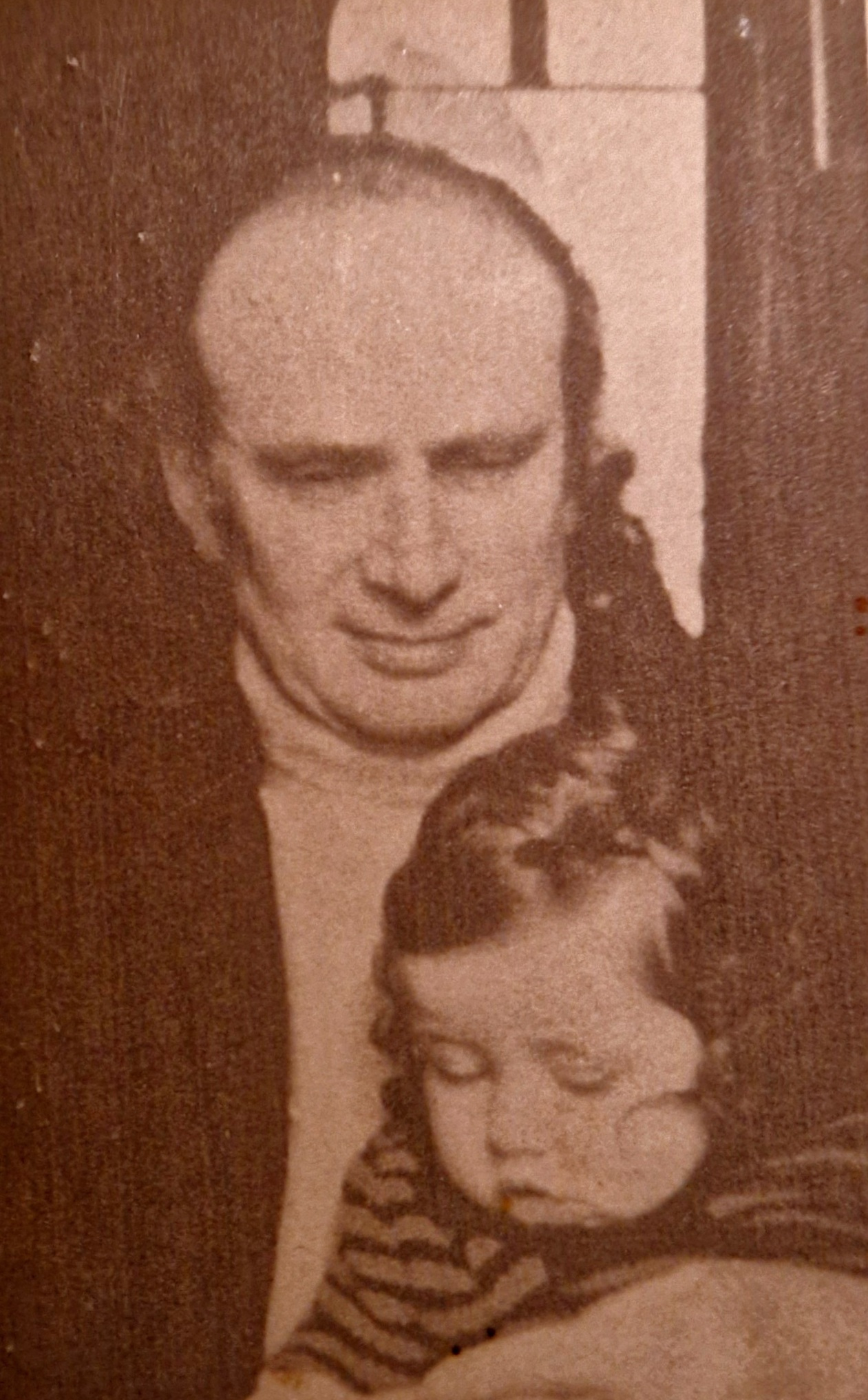
Philip O'Connor and his son Félix, Wimereux, 1974.

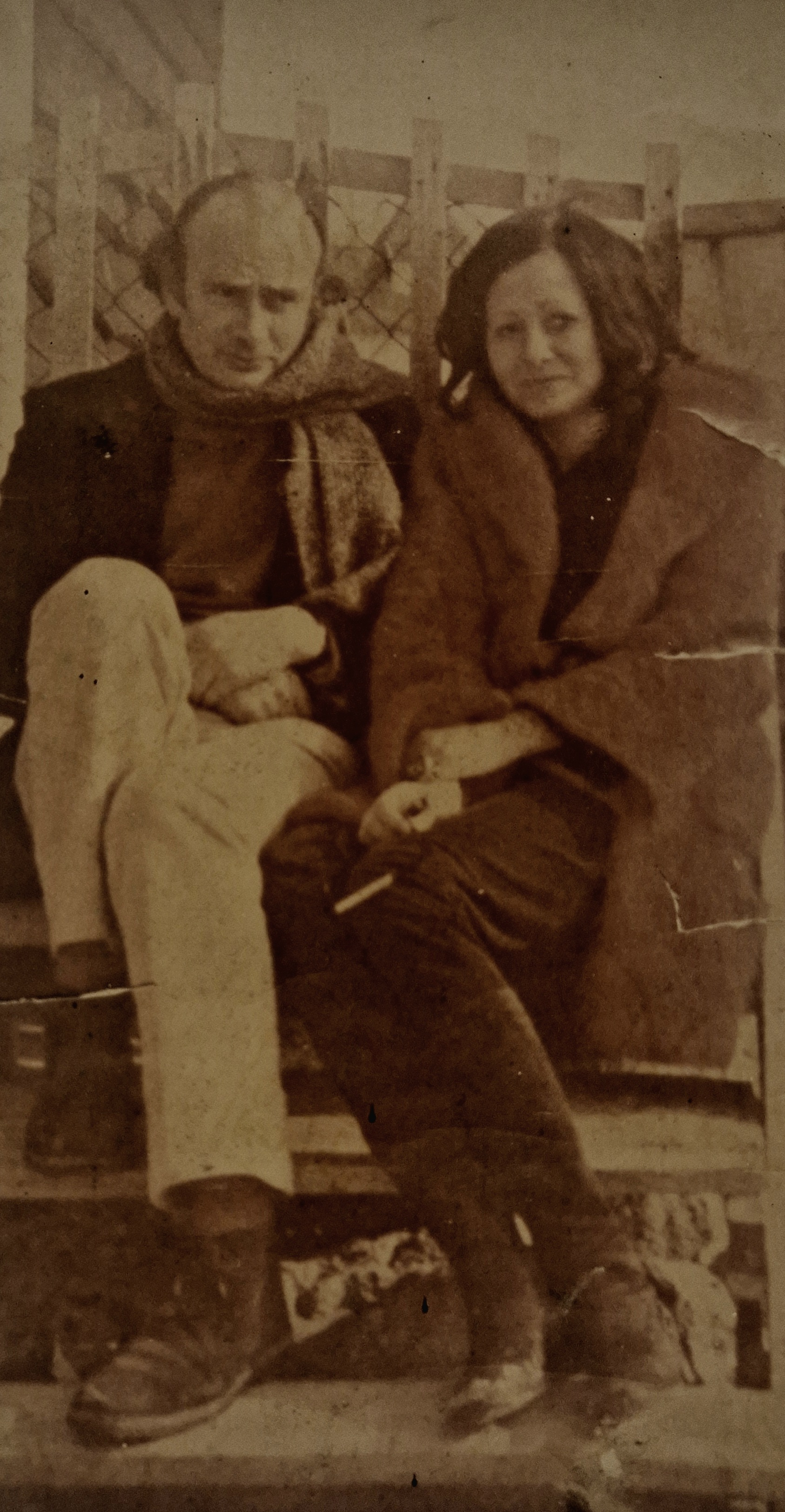
Philip O'Connor and Panna Grady, Wimereux, 1970

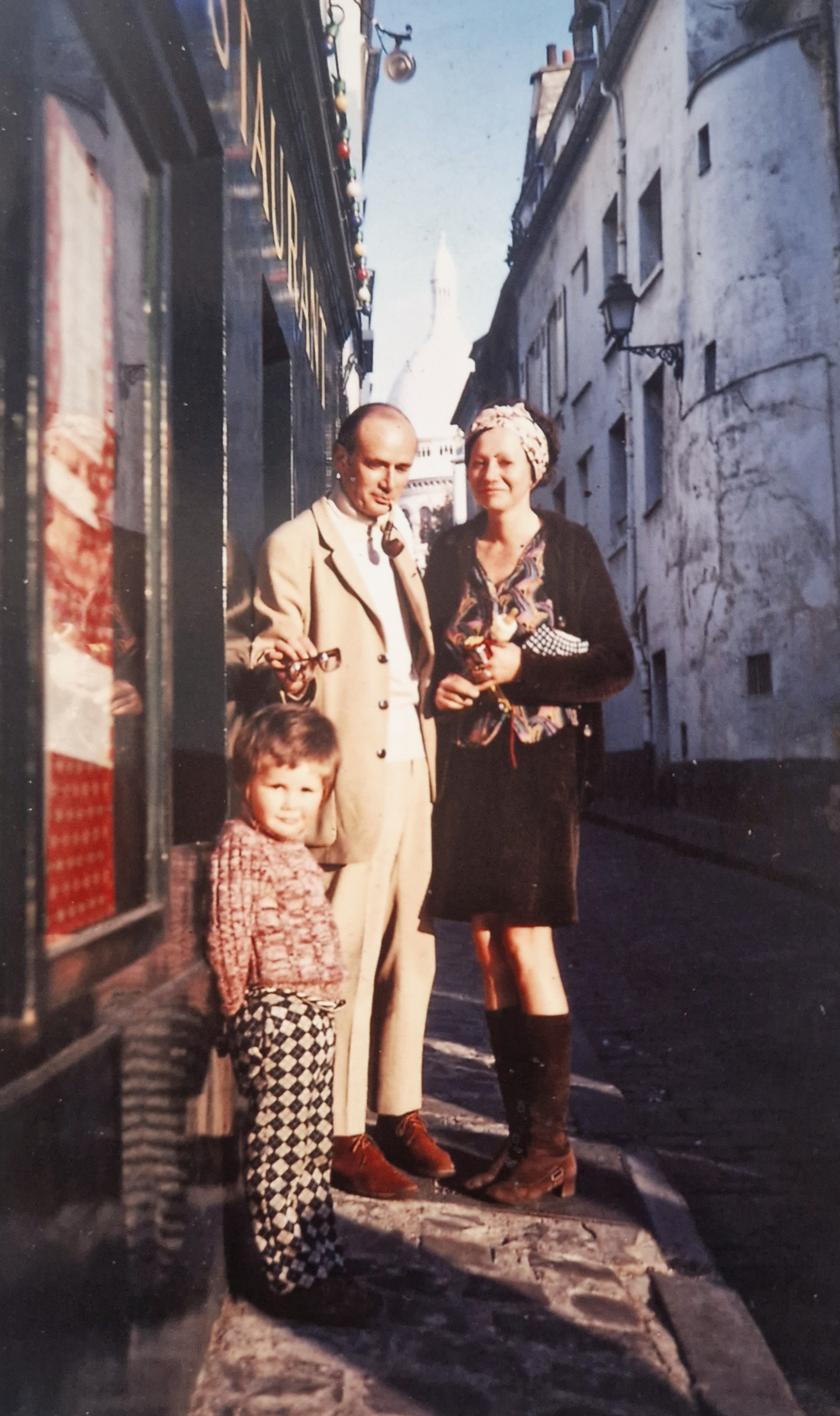
Philip O'Connor, Panna Grady and Maxim, Paris 1972

Philip Marie Constant Bancroft O'Connor (8 September 1916 – 29 May 1998) was a British writer and surrealist poet, who also painted. He was one of the '"Wheatsheaf" writers' of 1930s Fitzrovia (who took their name from a pub).

== Early life ==
In his Memoirs of a Public Baby (1958, Faber and Faber) O'Connor wrote about his early life, which was "shrouded in a good deal of mystery and make-believe". According to O'Connor, his father, Bernard, was an Oxford-educated surgeon of sophisticated tastes, descended from the last High King of Ireland; he allegedly died early in the First World War whilst serving in the Navy. Notwithstanding O'Connor's account, "neither the Admiralty, Oxford University nor the various doctors' registers are able to authenticate" what he wrote. Per O'Connor's account, his mother considered his father "riff-raff" and "a cad". O'Connor gave her name as Winifred Xavier Rodyke-Thompson, of an Irish Roman Catholic family; she claimed her grandfather had been born into the Spring Rice family headed by Baron Monteagle of Brandon, later changing his name. During O'Connor's childhood, his mother founded the Somerset Cigarette Agency and secured a government contract to produce inferior cigarettes for supply to soldiers. In 1934 he was a close friend in London with the author Laurie Lee, who mentions him in his book As I Walked Out One Midsummer Morning (chapter 2, pages 6–7).

== Career ==
Memoirs of a Public Baby was followed by The Lower View (1960), Living in Croesor (1962) and Vagrancy (1963). He was a heavy drinker and (at the very least) massively eccentric, living a mainly parasitic life. In his own words, he "bathed in life and dried [himself] on the typewriter".

In 1963, O'Connor interviewed an acquaintance, Quentin Crisp, for the BBC Third Programme. A publisher who happened to hear the broadcast was impressed by Crisp's performance, and as an indirect result of O'Connor's interview, Crisp ended up writing The Naked Civil Servant.

== Personal life ==
He fathered "an unknown number of attractive and intelligent children", including Philip, Max, Sarah, Peter, John, Allaye, Patric, Rachel, Maxim and Félix, referenced in his obituary in The New York Times. His first wife, married in 1941, was lawyer's daughter Jean Mary Hore, who was sent to a mental hospital after an attempt on her husband's life; she lived until 1997, having been confined for over fifty years. Jean was also the unrequited love of Paul Potts, who wrote about her in Dante Called You Beatrice (1960). In 1963 O'Connor married secondly (Anne) Nicolle Gaillard-d'Andel; Memoirs of a Public Baby is dedicated to Anna Wing, the actress and his third partner with whom he had a son, Jon, an education consultant and former teacher. O'Connor met the American heiress Panna Grady in 1967 and later settled with her in the Gard, in France, until his death in 1998. They never married. Two sons, Maxim and Félix, were born from their union.

== Works ==
=== Books ===
- Memoirs of a Public Baby (1958).
- The Lower View (1960).
- Steiner's Tour (1960).
- Living in Croesor (1962).
- Vagrancy (1963).
- Selected Poems 1936/1966 (1968)
- Arias of Water (1978-1980)

=== Radio ===
- He Who Refrains (1959).
- A Morality (1959).
- Anathema (1962).
- Success (1967), conversations with Philip Toynbee, Sir Michael Redgrave, Malcolm Muggeridge and John Berger.

== Biography ==
- Andrew Barrow, Quentin and Philip (2002), Macmillan, 559 pages, ISBN 0-333-78051-5. Dual biography of Quentin Crisp and his friend Philip O'Connor.
