= Paula Ludwig =

Austrian-German poet

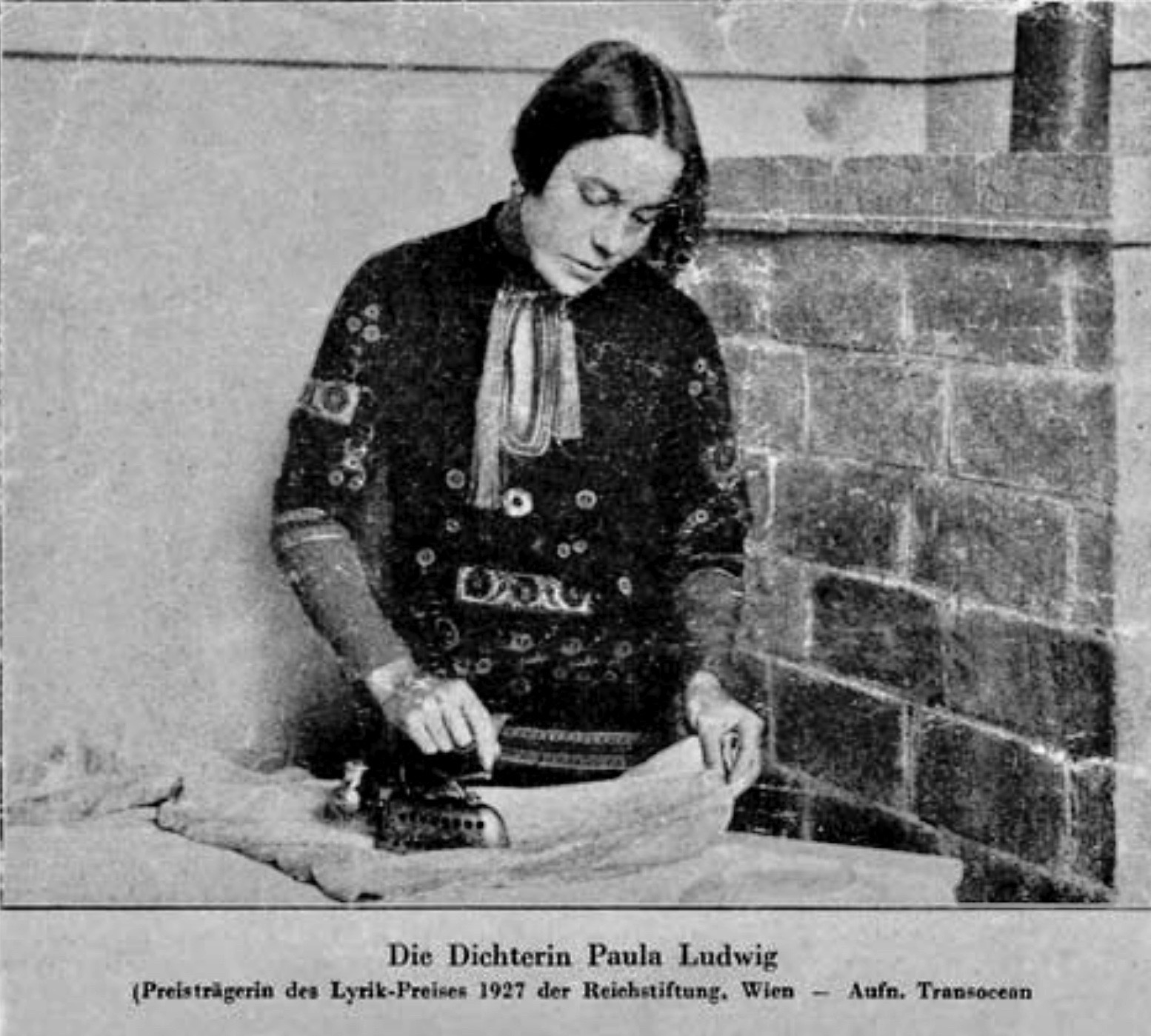
Paula Ludwig

Paula Ludwig (born 1900; died 1974 in Darmstadt) was an Austrian-German poet who won the 1963 George Trakl Prize. In her earlier life she had an affair with Yvan Goll, which caused a crisis for his wife Claire Goll. In 1940 she began a period of exile in Brazil due to the rise of Nazism. Her work has fallen into relative obscurity and often involved dreams.
