= The Naked Civil Servant (film) =

1975 British television film by Jack Gold

- DVD cover
- Based on: The Naked Civil Servant
- Screenplay by: Philip Mackie
- Directed by: Jack Gold
- Starring: John Hurt
- Music by: Carl Davis
- Country of origin: United Kingdom
- Original language: English

Production
- Executive producer: Verity Lambert
- Producer: Barry Hanson
- Cinematography: Mike Fash
- Editor: Mike Taylor
- Running time: 77 minutes
- Production company: Euston Films for Thames

Original release
- Network: ITV
- Release: 17 December 1975

The Naked Civil Servant is a 1975 made-for-television biographical comedy-drama film directed by Jack Gold and produced by Verity Lambert. It was adapted for film by Philip Mackie, based on Quentin Crisp's 1968 book of the same name. The movie stars John Hurt, Patricia Hodge and John Rhys-Davies. It was produced by Thames Television and originally broadcast on 17 December 1975 on the British channel ITV. In 1976, it was shown on the US channel WOR and later PBS when Thames Television and WOR exchanged programming for one week. For his performance, Hurt won the BAFTA for Best Actor in 1976 and the production also won the 1976 Prix Italia. The title of the book and the film is derived from Crisp's time working as a nude model in a government-funded art school.

In 2000, the film was placed fourth in a poll by industry professionals to find the BFI TV 100 of the 20th century, and was the highest ITV production on the list. The film was released on DVD in 2005. In 2009, Hurt reprised the role of Quentin Crisp in An Englishman in New York, which covered the latter years of Crisp's life spent in Manhattan.

== Synopsis ==
Quentin Crisp introduces the film, saying that the decision to find someone else to play him was right as they are bound to do it better than he does. He claims "any film, even the worst, is at least better than real life".

The film begins in the late 1920s, where a teenaged Quentin lives at home with his grumpy middle-class father and adoring mother. He is becoming aware of his sexual orientation and realises that he is not sexually attracted to women. His parents seek medical advice to discover what is wrong with him and finally end up sending him to art college to force him into society. At college he befriends a young female art student, but the relationship is strictly platonic. He later meets a transvestite prostitute who introduces him to the local gay hangout, and he discovers the joys of make-up. Fascinated with this discovery, Quentin dyes his hair red and parades his homosexuality like a badge. His father tells him he looks like a male whore, and not opposed to the idea, he begins working as a prostitute. After meeting his first boyfriend, Thumbnails, he leaves home.

In 1930, he gets a job as a commercial artist and moves out of Thumbnails' place, on his own, where he quits prostitution. It has become a mission to express his homosexuality, and as a result he is rejected by almost everyone. He is constantly beaten up and the gay community won't associate with him because he is far too flamboyant, and they are all still in the closet. After he loses his job, he moves in with a ballet teacher and starts teaching tap dancing. In 1939, Quentin is rejected from serving in the military because of his homosexuality. He then begins working as a nude model in a government-funded art school. He is later arrested for soliciting in London but he turns the situation to his advantage and gives a life-defining speech at his court hearing. He has so many good character witnesses that the case is thrown out of court.

In 1945, Quentin begins his third long-term relationship. His friend from art college has left her Polish lover to become a nun. Her lover though has been institutionalised due to paranoid delusions. Quentin begins visiting him every weekend, splits up with his burly boyfriend, and when the Pole is allowed out to visit him, they become lovers until the Pole hangs himself.

1975, at the end of the film, Quentin shares comments that the "symbols he adopted to express his individuality have become the uniform of all young people". He reminisces over one night of perfect happiness and declares himself "one of the stately homos of England".

== Cast ==
- John Hurt as Quentin Crisp
- Liz Gebhardt as Art Student
- Patricia Hodge as Ballet Teacher
- Stanley Lebor as Mr. Pole
- Katherine Schofield as Mrs. Pole
- Colin Higgins as Thumbnails
- John Rhys-Davies as Barndoor
- Lloyd Lamble as Mr. Crisp
- Joan Ryan as Mrs. Crisp
- Shane Briant as Norma
- Roger Lloyd-Pack as Liz
- Adrian Shergold as Gloria
- Ron Pember as Black Cat Proprietor

== Film reviews ==
TV Guide said the film is remembered for "John Hurt's fine performance", and for the "controversy that arose when the film first aired on U.S. television...though it was not clear how many protestors had actually watched the film they were complaining about". They concluded "the film plays well to current-day audiences, who can enjoy Hurt's well-crafted acting and the unapologetic way with which he portrays the character". Kate Muir, TV critic for The Times said "thanks to Hurt's extraordinary performance...soft-skinned, red-lipped and determined to fight politely for his rights ...it still seems relevant and not just an exercise in nostalgia".

In a contemporary review from 1977, the Los Angeles Free Press, said "it is well that Hurt's performance is preserved on film, for it is an extraordinary achievement, proof of the day that the grand manner in acting is not over." They go on to say that "dignity is the core of Hurt's characterization, a dignity that turns every negative situation toward the positive."

== See also ==
- LGBTQ culture in London
- LGBTQ history
