= Quentin Crisp =

English raconteur (1908–1999)

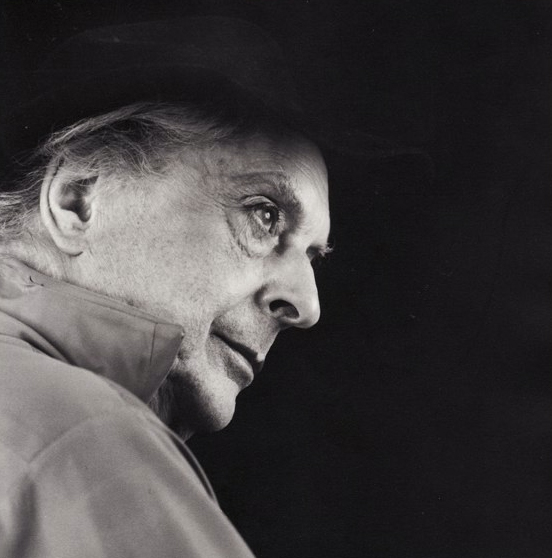
- In New York City, 1992
- Born: Denis Charles Pratt; 25 December 1908; Sutton, Surrey, England
- Died: 21 November 1999 (aged 90); Manchester, England
- Occupations: Writer, illustrator, actress, artist's model
- Writing career
- Notable work: The Naked Civil Servant

Quentin Crisp (born Denis Charles Pratt; 25 December 1908 – 21 November 1999) was an English raconteur whose personal expression broke social norms of the era. Crisp gained notoriety for her 1968 memoir The Naked Civil Servant, popularized by its 1975 screen adaptation. Her flamboyant personality, fashion, and wit made Crisp a queer icon, and a sensation in live solo appearances later in life.

Crisp worked briefly as a rent boy during her teen years, then spent three decades as a professional artist's model for life classes in art colleges. The interviews she gave about her unusual life attracted great curiosity, and she was soon sought after for her personal views on social manners and the cultivation of style.

Her solo stage show was a long-running hit both in Britain and America, and she also appeared in films and on television. Crisp defied convention by criticising both gay liberation and Diana, Princess of Wales. Some of Crisp's public remarks regarding the AIDS crisis earned censure from gay activists and human rights advocates.

== Biography ==
=== Early life ===
Denis Charles Pratt was born at Wolverton, Egmond Road, Sutton, Surrey, on 25 December 1908, the fourth and youngest child of "feckless and frequently unemployed" solicitor Spencer Charles Pratt, and former governess Frances Marion, née Phillips. She changed her name to Quentin Crisp in her twenties after leaving home, and expressed a feminine appearance to a degree that shocked contemporary Londoners and provoked "gay-bashing" assaults.

By her own account, Crisp was "effeminate" from an early age, resulting in her being teased while at Kingswood House School, a boys-only school.

Around this time, Crisp began visiting the cafés of Soho, her favourite being The Black Cat in Old Compton Street, meeting young gay men and rent boys, and experimenting with make-up and women's clothes. For six months, she worked as a prostitute; in a 1998 interview, she said she was looking for love, but found only degradation.

=== Middle years ===
Crisp attempted to join the British army at the outbreak of the Second World War, but was rejected and declared exempt by the medical board on the grounds that she was "suffering from sexual perversion". In 1940, she moved into a first-floor flat at 129 Beaufort Street, Chelsea, a bed-sitting room that she occupied until she emigrated to the United States in 1981. She remained in London during the 1941 Blitz, stocked up on cosmetics, purchased two pounds of henna and later paraded through the streets during the black-out, picking up G.I.s. In the intervening years, she never attempted any housework, writing famously in her memoir The Naked Civil Servant: "After the first four years the dirt doesn't get any worse."

Crisp left her job as an engineer's tracer in 1942 to become a model in life classes in London and the Home Counties. Crisp wanted to call her book My Reign in Hell, but her agent insisted on The Naked Civil Servant, an insistence that later gave her pause when she offered the manuscript to Tom Maschler of Jonathan Cape on the same day that Desmond Morris delivered The Naked Ape. The Naked Civil Servant was published in 1968 to generally good reviews, although it initially only sold 3,500 copies. Crisp was then approached by the documentary film maker Denis Mitchell to be the subject of a 1968 short film in which she discussed her life and lifestyle. The documentary aired on British television in 1971.

=== Fame ===
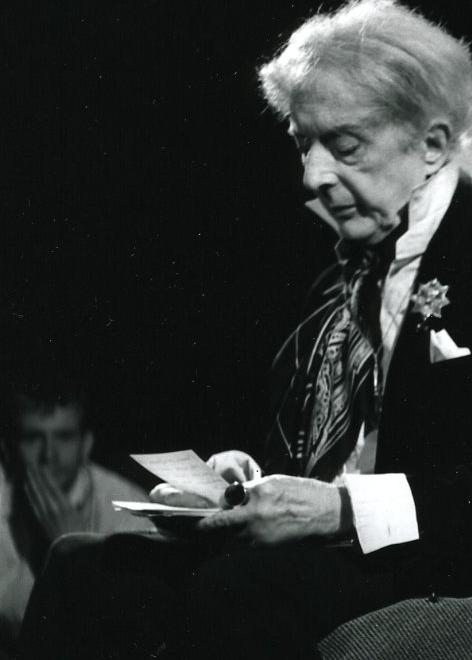
Quentin Crisp during a Q&A session for her book and the film The Naked Civil Servant

After the success of the film, her autobiography was reprinted; Gay News commented that it should have been published posthumously (Crisp said that this was their polite way of telling her to drop dead). Gay rights campaigner Peter Tatchell said he had met Crisp in 1974, and alleged that she was not sympathetic to the Gay Liberation movement of the time. Tatchell said Crisp quipped: "What do you want liberation from? What is there to be proud of? I don't believe in rights for homosexuals."

By now, Crisp was a theatre-filling humourist; in 1978, her one-man show sold out London's Duke of York's Theatre. She then took the show to New York. Her first stay in the Hotel Chelsea coincided with a fire, a robbery, and the death of Nancy Spungen. Crisp decided to move to New York permanently and, in 1981, found a small apartment at 46 East 3rd Street in Manhattan's East Village.

As she had done in London, Crisp allowed her telephone number to be listed in the telephone directory. She saw it as her duty to converse with anyone who called her, saying "If you don't have your name in the phone book, you're stuck with your friends. How will you ever enlarge your horizons?"

Quentin Crisp's handwriting and signature, from a dedication on the title page of How to Become a Virgin (1981)

Crisp continued to perform her one-man show, published books on the importance of contemporary manners as a means of social inclusion (as opposed to etiquette, which she claimed is socially exclusive), and supported herself by accepting social invitations and writing film reviews and columns for UK and US magazines and newspapers. She said that provided one could exist on peanuts and champagne, one could quite easily live by going to every cocktail party, premiere and first night to which one was invited.

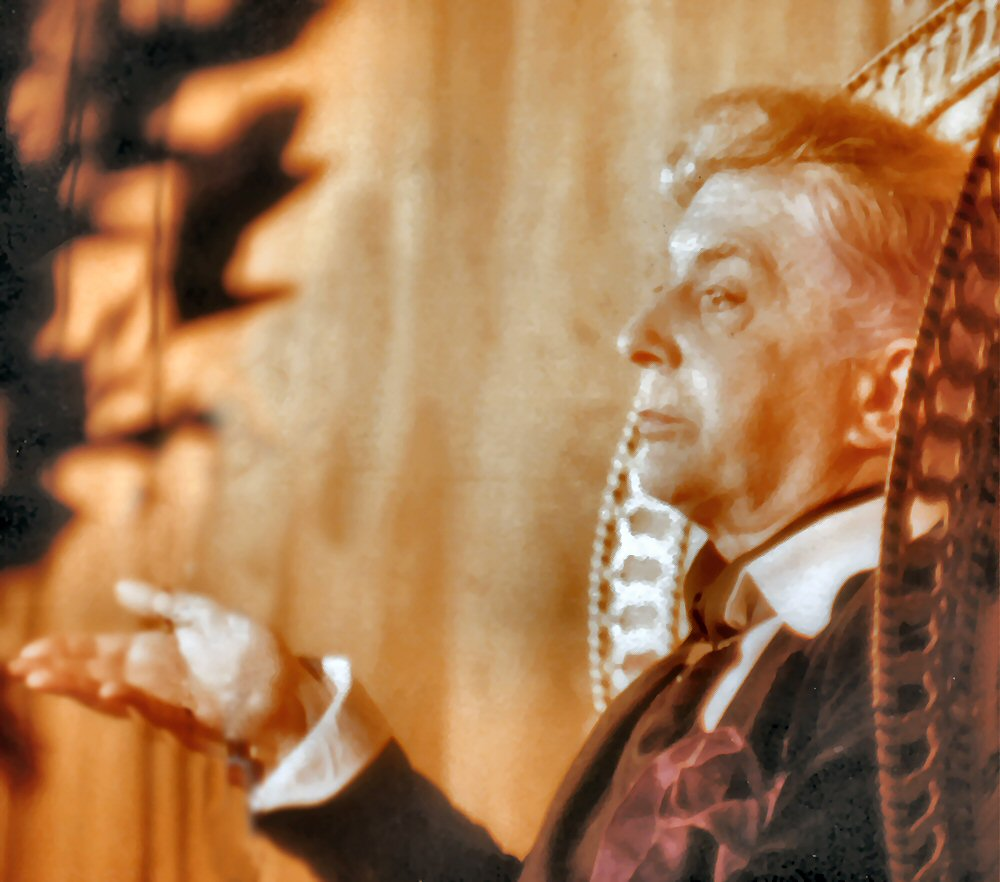
Quentin Crisp in a performance of her one-man show, An Evening With Quentin Crisp, in Birmingham, 1982

=== Last years ===
Crisp remained fiercely independent and unpredictable into old age. She caused controversy and confusion in the gay community by (perhaps jokingly) calling AIDS "a fad", and homosexuality "a terrible disease".

Crisp was a stern critic of Diana, Princess of Wales, and her attempts to gain public sympathy following her divorce from Prince Charles. She stated: "I always thought Diana was such trash and got what she deserved. She was Lady Diana before she was Princess Diana, so she knew the racket. She knew that royal marriages have nothing to do with love. You marry a man and you stand beside him on public occasions and you wave and for that you never have a financial worry until the day you die." Following her death in 1997, she commented that it was perhaps her "fast and shallow" lifestyle that led to her demise: "She could have been Queen of England – and she was swanning about Paris with Arabs. What disgraceful behaviour! Going about saying she wanted to be the queen of hearts. The vulgarity of it is so overpowering."

In 1997, Crisp was crowned king of the Beaux-Arts Ball run by the Beaux Arts Society. She presided alongside Queen Audrey Kargere, Prince George Bettinger and Princess Annette Hunt.

=== Gender identity ===
In an interview with CBC in 1977, upon being queried about whether she desired to be a woman, Crisp stated: "Well, I suppose when I was a child, when I lived almost entirely in a dreamworld, I suppose I thought of myself as a woman. But, later on, you realise that you have to live in the real world, and that you are not a woman. You are only in some senses 'effeminate', or 'feminine', and you must learn to make this compromise – to live in a world where, statistically, you are a man, whatever you may think about yourself."

At the age of 90, Crisp said in her book The Last Word that she had come to the conclusion that she was transgender:

Having labelled myself homosexual and having been labelled as such by the wider world, I have effectively lived a "gay" life for most of my years. Consequently, I can relate to gay men because I have more or less been one for so long in spite of my actual fate being that of a woman trapped in a man's body. I refer to myself as homosexual without thinking because of how I have lived my life. If you are reading this and are gay, think of me as one of your own even though you now know the truth. If it's confusing for you, think how confusing it has been for me these past ninety years....

The only thing in my life I have wanted and didn't get was to be a woman. It will be my life's biggest regret. If the operation had been available and cheap when I was young, say when I was twenty-five or twenty-six, I would have jumped at the chance. My life would have been much simpler as a result. I would have told nobody. Instead, I would have gone to live in a distant town and run a knitting wool shop and no one would ever have known my secret. I would have joined the real world and it would have been wonderful.

=== Death ===
Crisp died of a heart attack on 21 November 1999, at age 90, while staying at the home of a friend in Chorlton-cum-Hardy, Manchester, on the eve of a nationwide revival of her one-man show. She was cremated with a minimum of ceremony as she had requested, and her ashes were flown back to her personal assistant and travel companion Phillip Ward in New York.

=== Posthumously published works ===
On 21 November 2017, MB Books published The Last Word: An Autobiography, written by Crisp's friend, Phillip Ward, on the basis of tape recordings made of Crisp's dictations, and edited by Ward and Watts. Whereas The Naked Civil Servant made Crisp famous, and How To Become A Virgin detailed that fame and her life in New York, The Last Word was written as a goodbye to the world, with Crisp knowing the end was near. In it she recounts several previously untold stories from her life, walks the reader through her journey from obscurity, reflects on her philosophy and gender identity.

== Influence and legacy ==
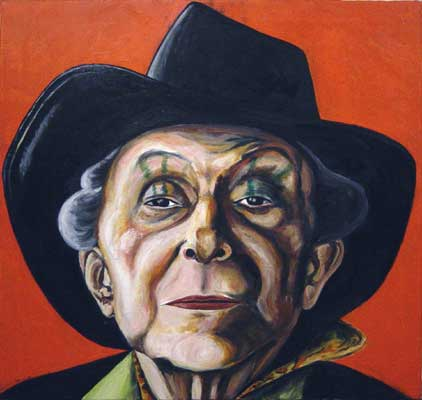
Quentin Crisp (oil on canvas), a portrait by American painter Ella Guru. As the sculptor John W. Mills had done before her, Guru rendered Crisp wearing her trademark fedora.

Sting dedicated his song "Englishman in New York" (1987) to Crisp, who had jokingly remarked "that he looked forward to receiving his naturalisation papers so that he could commit a crime and not be deported." In late 1986, Sting visited Crisp in her apartment and was told over dinner, and over the next three days, what life had been like for a homosexual man in the largely homophobic Great Britain of the 1920s to the 1960s. Sting was both shocked and fascinated and decided to write the song. It includes the lines:

It takes a man to suffer ignorance and smile,
Be yourself no matter what they say.

Sting says, "Well, it's partly about me and partly about Quentin. Again, I was looking for a metaphor. Quentin is a hero of mine, someone I know very well. [Quentin] is gay and [she] was gay at a time in history when it was dangerous to be so. [She] had people beating up on [her] on a daily basis, largely with the consent of the public."

In 1991, a documentary about Crisp, Resident Alien, was released by Greycat Films.

The 1981 synthpop song No G.D.M by German electro band Gina X Performance is dedicated to Crisp. The song The Ballad of Jack Eric Williams (and Other Three-Named Composers) from William Finn's 2003 song-cycle Elegies refers to her.

That same year, Crisp's great-nephew, academic and film-maker Adrian Goycoolea, premiered a short documentary, Uncle Denis?, at the 23rd London Lesbian & Gay Film Festival. The film uses interviews with family and previously unseen home movie footage. In collaboration with Crisperanto (The Quentin Crisp Archives) curator Phillip Ward, Goycoolea also created an installation entitled 'Personal Effects'.

In 2013, with curator Ward, the Museum of Arts and Design in Manhattan staged a three-month retrospective on Crisp, entitled Ladies and Gentlemen, Mr. Quentin Crisp. The retrospective consisted of free screenings of interviews, one man shows, documentaries and other recorded media.

In 2014 Mark Farrelly's solo performance Quentin Crisp: Naked Hope debuted at the Edinburgh Festival, before transferring to the St. James's Theatre in London and subsequently touring. It depicts Crisp at her Chelsea flat in the 1960s and performing her one-man show thirty years later.

In the 2016 Ghostbusters reboot, Bill Murray explicitly based the dress style of his character (Martin Heiss) on Crisp.

In his 2020 autobiography Confess, Rob Halford of Judas Priest identifies Crisp as having been a hero of his. When the then closeted Halford had first seen The Naked Civil Servant in 1975, he had been impressed by the film and Crisp. Halford came out, in an MTV interview, on 4 February 1998. In 1999, Halford attended San Diego Pride with his partner, Thomas. While there, Halford met Crisp, and got a book signed by her ('To Rob, from Quentin'). According to Halford, he continues to treasure the signed book. Halford views himself as a rock version of Crisp, and refers to himself as the "stately homo of heavy metal".

== Works ==
- Lettering for Brush and Pen (1936), Quentin Crisp and A.F. Stuart, Frederick Warne Ltd. Manual on typefaces for advertising. OCLC 503850262
- Colour in Display (1938) Quentin Crisp, 131 pp., The Blandford Press. Manual on the use of colour in window displays. OCLC 557871368
- All This and Bevin Too (1943) Quentin Crisp, illustrated by Mervyn Peake, Mervyn Peake Society ISBN 978-0-9506125-0-8. Parable, in verse, about an unemployed kangaroo.
- The Naked Civil Servant (1968) Quentin Crisp, 222 pp., HarperCollins, ISBN 978-0-00-654044-1. Crisp's account of the first half of her life.
- How to Have a Life Style (1975), Quentin Crisp, 159 pp., Cecil Woolf Publ., ISBN 978-0-900821-83-7. Essays on charisma and personality.
- Love Made Easy (1977) Quentin Crisp, 154 pp., Duckworth, ISBN 978-0-7156-1188-3. Fantastical, semi-autobiographical novel.
- Chog: A Gothic Fable (1979), Quentin Crisp, Methuen, London. Illustrated by Jo Lynch, Magnum (1981).
- How to Become a Virgin (1981) Quentin Crisp, 192 pp., HarperCollins, ISBN 978-0-00-638798-5. The second instalment of autobiography, describing her experience of the fame that The Naked Civil Servant and its dramatisation brought.
- Doing It With Style (1981) Quentin Crisp, with Donald Carroll, illustrated by Jonathan Hills, 157 pp., Methuen, ISBN 978-0-413-47490-2. A guide to thoughtful and stylish living.
- The Wit and Wisdom of Quentin Crisp (1984) Quentin Crisp, edited by Guy Kettelhack, Harper & Row, 140 pp., ISBN 978-0-06-091178-2. Compilation of Crisp's essays and quotations.
- Manners from Heaven: a divine guide to good behaviour (1984) Quentin Crisp, with John Hofsess, Hutchinson, ISBN 978-0-09-155810-9. Instructions for compassionate living.
- How to Go to the Movies (1988) Quentin Crisp, 224 pp., St. Martin's Press, ISBN 978-0-312-05444-1. Movie reviews and essays on film.
- Quentin Crisp's Book of Quotations, also published as The Gay and Lesbian Quotation Book: a literary companion (1989) edited by Quentin Crisp, Hale, 185 pp. ISBN 978-0-7090-5605-8. Anthology of gay-related quotes.
- Resident Alien: The New York Diaries (1996) Quentin Crisp, 232 pp., HarperCollins, ISBN 978-0-00-638717-6. Diaries and recollections from 1990 to 1994.
- The Last Word: An Autobiography, (2017) Quentin Crisp, edited by Phillip Ward and Laurence Watts, MB Books, 232 pp., ISBN 978-0-692-96848-2. Quentin Crisp's final book, the third and last instalment of her autobiography, written during the last two years of her life.
- And One More Thing, (2019) Quentin Crisp, edited by Phillip Ward and Laurence Watts, MB Books, 193 pp., ISBN 978-0-692-16809-7. A companion book to Quentin Crisp's The Last Word: An Autobiography. Crisp shares her views on other people, their lives and their opinions. Included is the script for Quentin's Alternative Christmas Message, broadcast on Britain's Channel 4 in 1993, the script of her one-man show An Evening With Quentin Crisp and her collected poetry.

== Filmography ==
- Captain Busby: the Even Tenour of Her Ways - (1967) - with Martina Mayne, as Marcella
- World in Action (documentary) (Broadcast 1971, filmed in 1968) ...himself. Directed by Denis Mitchell.
- The Naked Civil Servant (1975) (introduction)... himself
- Hamlet (1976) .... Polonius
- The Bride.... Dr. Zalhus
- The Equalizer .... Ernie Frick (episode, "First Light") (1987)
- Ballad of Reading Gaol (short) (1988) .... Narrator
- Kojak: Flowers for Matty (TV movie) (1990) ... Mr. Isabella
- Resident Alien (1990) (autobiography) .... Himself
- Topsy and Bunker: The Cat Killers (1992) .... Pat the Doorman
- Orlando (1992) .... Queen Elizabeth I
- Philadelphia (1993) (uncredited) .... Guest at Party
- Red Ribbons (1994) (Video) .... Horace Nightingale III
- Aunt Fannie (1994) (Video) .... Aunt Fannie
- Naked in New York (1994) .... himself
- Natural Born Crazies (1994) .... Narrator
- To Wong Foo, Thanks for Everything! Julie Newmar (1995) .... New York pageant judge
- Taylor Mead Unleashed, (documentary-1996) Himself. Sebastian Piras director
- Little Red Riding Hood (1997) (voice) .... Narrator
- Barriers (1998)
- Famous Again (1998)

== Discography ==
- "An Evening with Quentin Crisp" (2008) .... Cherry Red Records (U.K.) .... Double C.D. featuring live recordings made at Columbia Recording Studios, New York, on 22 February 1979. Also includes a 35-minute interview with Crisp by Morgan Fisher, recorded in June 1980.
- "Miniatures 1 & 2" (2008) .... Cherry Red Records (U.K.) .... Double C.D. of one-minute tracks by many muses, poets, etc. Produced by Morgan Fisher in 1980 (Pt.1) and 2000 (Pt. 2). Crisp's track is titled "Stop the Music for a Minute".

== See also ==
- LGBT culture in New York City
- List of LGBTQ people from New York City

== Notes ==
- Take It Like A Man, Boy George, Sidgwick & Jackson, 490 pages, ISBN 978-0-283-99217-9. Autobiography of Boy George.
- Coming on Strong, Joan Rhodes, Serendipity Books, 2007. Autobiography of strongwoman Joan Rhodes who was an intimate friend of Crisp's for over half a century.
- The Krays and Bette Davis, Patrick Newley, AuthorsOnline Books, 2005. Memoir by showbiz writer Patrick Newley who acted as Crisp's P.A. for some years.

=== Biographies ===
- The Stately Homo: a celebration of the life of Quentin Crisp, (2000) edited by Paul Bailey, Bantam, 251 pages, ISBN 978-0-593-04677-7. Collection of interviews and tributes from those who knew Crisp.
- Quentin Crisp, (2002), Tim Fountain, Absolute Press, 192 pages, ISBN 978-1-899791-48-4. Biography by dramatist who knew Crisp in the last few years of his life.
- Quentin & Philip, (2002), Andrew Barrow, Macmillan, 559 pages, ISBN 978-0-333-78051-0. Dual biography of Crisp and his friend Philip O'Connor.
- Quentin Crisp: The Profession of Being, (2011), Nigel Kelly, McFarland, ISBN 978-0-7864-6475-3. Biography of Mr Crisp by Nigel Kelly who runs the www.quentincrisp.info website.
