= Indian National Army in popular culture =

INA in popular culture

The Indian National Army (INA) and its leader Subhash Chandra Bose are popular and emotive topics within India. From the time it came into public perception in India around the time of the Red Fort Trials, it found its way into the works of military historians around the world. It has been the subject of a number of projects, of academic, historical and of popular nature. Some of these are critical of the army, some — especially of the ex-INA men — are biographical or autobiographical, while still others historical and political works, that tell the story of the INA. A large number of these provide analyses of Subhas Chandra Bose and his work with the INA.

== Commemorations ==
=== Memorials ===
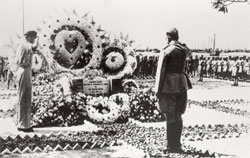
Subhas Chandra Bose laying foundation stone of INA War Memorial, Singapore on 8 July 1945.

- The INA War Memorial at Singapore to commemorate the "Unknown Warrior" of the INA. Started on 8 July 1945 the memorial was situated at the Esplanade Park. It was destroyed on Mountbatten's orders when allied troops reoccupied the city. The words inscribed upon the War Memorial were the motto of the INA: Ittehad (Unity), Etmad (Faith) and Kurbani (Sacrifice).

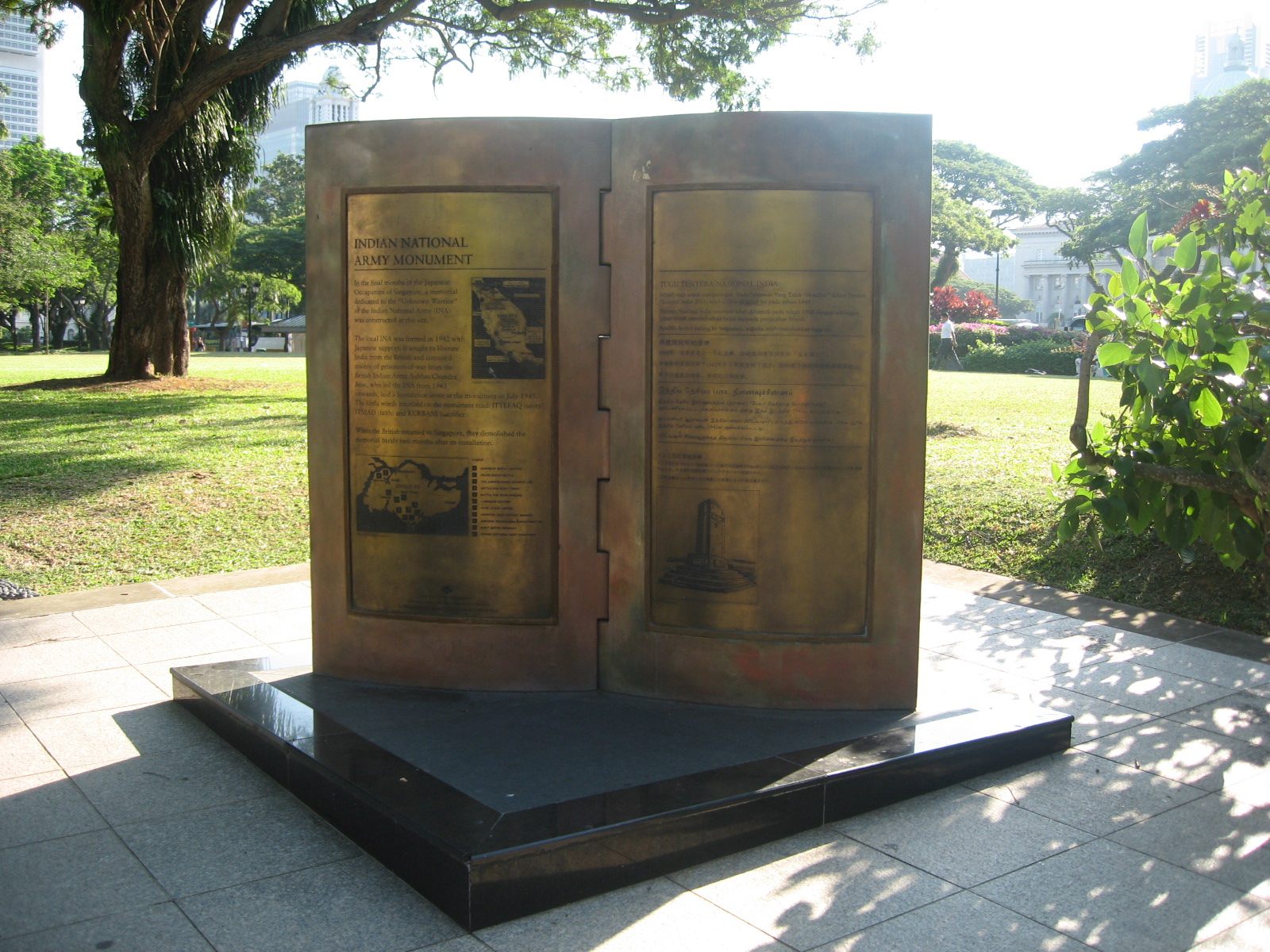
The plaque erected by the National Heritage Board at Esplanade Park, marking the INA Monument site in Singapore

- The Former Indian National Army Monument (Chinese: 印度国民军纪念碑), was established in 1995 by the National Heritage Board of Singapore at the site where the old memorial stood with financial donations from the Indian community in Singapore. The site is now officially one of the Historical sites in Singapore.
- The Indian National Army Memorial at Moirang, Manipur commemorates the place where the flag of Azad Hind was raised by Col. Shaukat Hayat Malik. Moirang was the first Indian territory captured by the INA. The memorial suffered damage in an insurgent attack in 2004 when the Statue of the Springing Tiger on the entrance was blown up.
- Swatantrata Sainani Smarak (Memorial to the soldiers of the Independence Army) is an Indian National Army (INA) memorial at the Salimgarh Fort, at Delhi, adjacent to the Red Fort, on the banks of the Yamuna. The site has been neglected for a number of years now and fallen into disrepair. Its exhibits include the Indian National Army uniform worn by Colonel Prem Sahgal, riding boots and coat buttons of Colonel Gurbaksh Singh Dhillon, photographs of Subhas Chandra Bose. In addition, a separate gallery also holds material and photographs from excavations carried out by the Archaeological Survey of India inside the fort in 1995.

=== Postage and philately ===
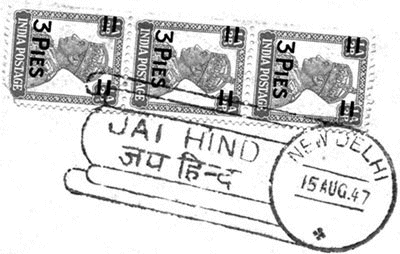
Indian commemorative post-mark of Jai Hind

- Jai Hind, the INA's battle cry, became Independent India's first commemorative post mark on 15 August 1947.
- The first postage stamp issued by Independent India shows the Indian Flag with the letters Jai Hind in the top right hand corner. These were a part of the Jai Hind series of stamps issued on 15 August 1947.
- Commemorative postage stamps were issued by the Indian government in 1968 and 1993 respectively to commemorate the 25th and the 50th anniversaries of the establishment of Azad Hind at Singapore.

The Indian Postal Department also includes the six unused Azad Hind Stamps in its commemorative book India's Freedom Struggle through India Postage Stamps. The Azad Hind Fauj Marg (Azad Hind Fauj Road) in New Delhi is named after the INA, and houses the Netaji Subhas University of Technology.

== Literary works ==
The first literary works on the INA were published as early as 1946.Some were works of fiction with the INA as the central theme and subject, others the records of the INA that the authors were able to obtain from the ex-servicemen, or from what information was available from the trials and from what the British Intelligence possessed and that the authors had access to. Some of the literature focussed on the first INA trial itself. The notable work on INA include

- Freedom's Battle by Vithalbhai K Jhaveri. (Parmanand Sugnomal:Litho Works Tardeo, Bombay Printing Press, August 1947). Large format book covering INA in Action, 1942–1945, contains some beautiful full colour type poster pages with many pages of brownish hue photographs.
- Two Historic Trials at Red Fort by Moti Ram. (New Delhi:Roxy Printing Press,1946). This was one of the first published account of any sort of the INA and describes the Trial of Major General Shah Nawaz Khan, Col Prem Sahgal, and Col G.S. Dhillon that took place between November and December, 1946. Moti Ram was the staff correspondent of the Hindustan Times at the first Red Fort Trial and wrote his book on what information was available at the trial, and from interviews with the defendants, Sahgal, Khan and Dhillon. The book also provides an account of the 1858 trial of Bahadur Shah Zafar.
- Jai Hind, the Diary of a Rebel Daughter of India. Bombay, 1945 (fiction) by Amritlal Seth. The book is a work of fiction narrating the story of a recruit of the Rani of Jhansi Regiment. It is believed to be loosely based on the story of Lakshmi Sahgal.
- The Day of the Scorpion and The Towers of Silence, second and third respectively of Paul Scott's Raj Quartet that mentions Jiffs in the political and social context in which the term found use in the Eastern Army during the war. The 1984 British TV series, Jewel in the Crown The Jewel in the Crown (TV series), based on Scott's quartet, also includes the role of the INA as part of the political backdrop of the story, explicitly so especially in the 3rd episode of the series.
- The Glass Palace by Amitav Ghosh chronicles the fictional life of a Rangoon Teak trader and describes the occupation of Rangoon and the Indian perspectives and efforts In the book, Uma Dey is a widow and Indian Independence League activist. Her appearance in the later half of the book is used as a device to characterize the post-colonial divisions for the remainder of the novel. The novel describes the Burma front in some detail, examining the motivations of those Indian officers who joined the INA and those who did not.
- Flowers at Dawn by Singai Ma Elangkannan. (trans. A.R. Venkatachalapathy, Singapore: Epigram Books, 2012) War is looming when Anbarasan arrives in Singapore from Tamil Nadu in the 1940s. Stirred by charismatic Indian National Army leader Subhas Chandra Bose to take up the struggle for India’s independence, he fights alongside the Japanese against the British in Southeast Asia. In this moving novel of an early immigrant’s political and sensual awakening during World War II, "Flowers at Dawn" uncovers a little-known period of Singapore’s history with drama and realism.

Historical literary works on the INA includes

- My memories of I.N.A. & its Netaji' by Shah Nawaz Khan.
- On the Life of Munawar' by Muhammad Naveed Awan.
- The Indian National Army-Second Front of the Indian Independence Movement by Kalyan Ghosh.
- Jungle Alliance: Japan and the Indian National Army. by Joyce C Lebra.
- The Forgotten Army: India's Armed Struggle for Independence, 1942–1945. by Peter Fay.
- DutyBound by David Miller (2014)

== Visual media ==
Notable works on the INA in the visual and electronic media include

- The War of The Springing Tiger (1984)- made by Granada Television for Channel 4. It examines the role of the Indian National Army during the Second World War. The documentary focuses on a number of aspects, including why the PoWs chose to join the INA, its role in the Burma and Imphal Campaign, as well as exploring its role in the independence movement. The documentary took contributions from Lakshmi and Prem Sahgal.
- The Forgotten Army- (1999)- Film India. This was a documentary directed by Kabir Khan and produced by Akhil Bakshi following their famous Azad Hind Expedition in 1994–95. The expedition retraced the route taken by the troops of the INA from Singapore to Imphal and ends at Red Fort, where the famous trial of the officers were held. The expedition team had among its members Col G.S. Dhillon who himself was one of the famous accused in the first trial, Captain Lakshmi Sahgal, who commanded the Rani of Jhansi Regiment and was also the minister in Charge of Women's affairs in the Azad Hind Govt and Captain S.S. Yadava, an INA veteran and once the general secretary of All India INA Committee, as well as prominent members of the Indian Parliament. The expedition met, and honoured, a number of INA veterans residing in South East Asia. The then Indian Prime Minister PV Narasimha Rao sent through the expedition team goodwill messages to the heads of state of the countries it went through. The documentary went on to win the Grand Jury Prize at the Film South Asia festival in 1999.
- Hitler's secret Indian army (2004)-BBC- By Mike Thomson. This traces briefly the story of Bose's Azad Hind Legion in Europe, but does not attempt to distinguish or explain the differences between the Legion and the INA.
- Bose: Dead/Alive (2018) - An 8 episode web series based on the life of Subhas Chandra Bose released on Video on demand platform ALTBalaji. In this series the character of Bose is played by Rajkummar Rao.
- Historical Journey of the Indian National Army- From the National Archives of Singapore.
- Indian National Army in East Asia-Hindustan Times.

== Cinema ==
INA has also been the source of or a significant context of a number of movies in a number of Indian languages. Notable amongst these include

- Pahla Admi, a 1950 film by Bimal Roy and INA veteran Nazir Ahmed.
- Samadhi, a 1950 Hindi film by Ramesh Saigal. The movie was a fictional drama set in Singapore around the time the second INA was rising. The lead character of Shekhar, played by Ashok Kumar, is a young recruit to the INA.
- Indian, a 1996 Tamil film directed by S. Shankar. The plot describes one of the main character, Senapathy, as an ex-soldier in the INA.
- Netaji: The Forgotten Hero, a 2004 movie by Shyam Benegal, traces the last five years of Subhas Chandra Bose, who was the Supreme Commander of the second INA and was instrumental in reorganising it. The film describes the story of the INA but focuses on its leader. The film was also widely noted for A R Rahman's music.
- Rangoon (2017) - A historical film directed by Vishal Bhardwaj revolves around the story of INA.
- Raag Desh (2017) - A film directed by Tigmanshu Dhulia and produced by Rajya Sabha TV was released in 2017. The film is based on Indian National Army trials, the joint court martial of Indian National Army officers Colonel Prem Sehgal, Colonel Gurbaksh Singh Dhillon, Major Shah Nawaz Khan.
- The Forgotten Army - Azaadi Ke Liye (2020), is a six-episode web television series which premiered on Amazon Prime Video on 24 January 2020. The series is directed by Kabir Khan, the series is based on true events about the men and women in the Indian National Army (INA) led by Subhash Chandra Bose.

== Music ==
- In music, Qadam Qadam Badhaye Ja..., the INA's marching song, has since become a famous patriotic song in India. Today, it is in use as the Regimental quick march of the Indian Army as well as its Para Regiments. The music was composed by Ram Singh Thakuri, from whose composition was later derived the tune for India's national anthem Jana Gana Mana.

Other mentions of the INA in popular culture abound through India, including

- The Azad Hind Fauj Marg, in New Delhi, is named after the INA, and houses the Netaji Subhas University of Technology named after Netaji Subhas Chandra Bose.
