= Works by Terry Nation =

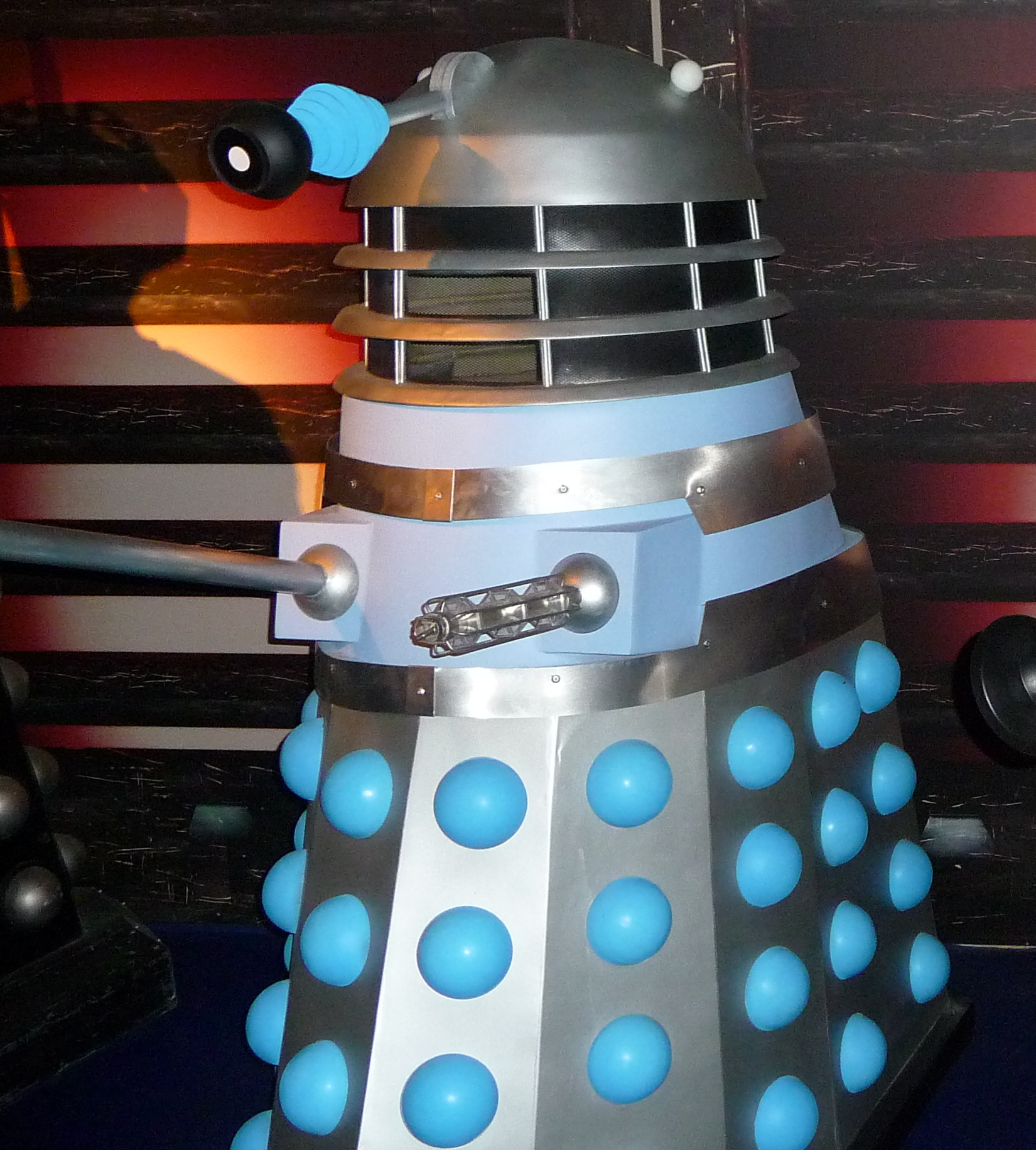
A Dalek, the creation for which Terry Nation is best known.

Terry Nation (1930–1997) was a Welsh screenwriter and novelist known for his work on British science fiction television programmes in the 1960s and 1970s. He created the Daleks, a fictional extraterrestrial race in the BBC science fiction television series Doctor Who.

Nation began his media career as a radio comedy writer. He wrote gags for the Welsh-produced BBC radio series Welsh Rarebit before moving to London in 1955 with writing partner Dick Barry. Nation subsequently joined Spike Milligan's writers' co-operative Associated London Scripts, through which he wrote comedy material for Frankie Howerd, Ted Ray, Eric Sykes Peter Sellers, Jimmy Logan, Elsie and Doris Waters and Harry Worth. After Barry left the UK in 1956, Nation often co-wrote with John Junkin and Johnny Speight. Nation transitioned from comedy to science fiction television writing by contributing three episodes to Irene Shubik's anthology series Out of This World in 1962. Nation began writing for comedian Tony Hancock in 1962, but was allegedly sacked by Hancock the following year.

Nation's seven-part Doctor Who serial The Daleks, which aired from December 1963 to February 1964, introduced the eponymous xenophobic aliens to the series. The Daleks were highly popular with audiences, and as Nation owned their copyright, he became very wealthy through licensing and merchandising deals. He contributed further Dalek stories to the series from 1964 to 1965. Nation subsequently worked on various science fiction, thriller and espionage television series, beginning with The Saint in 1964. He contributed episodes to the ITV series The Champions (1968–1969), Department S (1969–1970) and The Persuaders! (1971–1972), the latter of which he served as associate producer and script associate. Nation became script supervisor and writer on the series The Baron; this commitment meant that David Whitaker wrote the final two Dalek serials of the 1960s. After the broadcast of The Evil of the Daleks (1967), Nation withdrew the villains' rights from the programme and sought to develop a Dalek spin-off series.

Nation created the science fiction television series Survivors (1975) and Blake's 7 (1978–1980), aimed at a more adult audience than Doctor Who. Nation moved to Los Angeles in 1980, though this period of his career produced less notable work. He contributed three 1985 episodes to MacGyver and was a consultant on the 1996 Doctor Who television film during its early development.

== Television ==
Year	Title	Broadcaster	Notes	Ref.
1956	The Idiot Weekly, Price 2d	Associated-Rediffusion	5 episodes; co-written with Dave Freeman, John Junkin, and Spike Milligan	
1957	Friday the 13th	BBC	One-off sketch programme; co-written with John Junkin	
1958	Val Parnell's Startime	ATV for ITV	Variety show; contributions by Nation and John Junkin	
1958–1959	The Ted Ray Show	BBC	8 episodes; co-written with John Junkin	
1959	Hi, Summer!		14 episodes; co-written with George Wadmore, Hugh Woodhuose, and John Junkin)	
1959–1960	The Jimmy Logan Show	BBC	9 episodes; co-written with John Junkin	
1962	Out of This World	ABC for ITV	"Imposter"; written by Nation, based on Philip K. Dick's short story; "Botany Bay"; "Immigrant"; written by Nation, based on Clifford D. Simak's novella	
1962	No Hiding Place	Associated-Rediffusion	"Run for the Sea"	
1963	Hancock	ATV for ITV	4 episodes: "The Assistant"; written by Nation, based on a story by Ray Whyberd (Ray Alan); "The Night Out"; "The Reporter"; "The Writer"	
1963	Wish You Were Here	BBC	Variety special; Linking material	
1963–1979	Doctor Who	BBC	11 serials: The Daleks (7 episodes; 1963); The Keys of Marinus (6 episodes; 1964); The Dalek Invasion of Earth (6 episodes; 1964); The Chase (6 episodes; 1965); "Mission to the Unknown" (1965); The Daleks' Master Plan (6 episodes; 1965) (Note: Nation wrote episodes 1–5 and 7 of The Daleks' Master Plan, whereas Dennis Spooner wrote episodes 6 and 8–12.); Planet of the Daleks (6 episodes; 1973); Death to the Daleks (4 episodes; 1974); Genesis of the Daleks (6 episodes; 1975); The Android Invasion (4 episodes; 1975); Destiny of the Daleks (4 episodes; 1979; uncredited rewrites by Douglas Adams)	
1964	Play of the Week	ITV	"Uncle Selwyn"	
1964	Story Parade	BBC	2 episodes: "The Caves of Steel"; written by Nation, based on Isaac Asimov's novel; "A Kiss Before Dying"; written by Nation, based on Ira Levin's novel	
1964–1968	The Saint	ATV for ITV	14 episodes: "Lida" (1964); "Jeannine" (1964); "The Revolution Racket" (1964); "The Contract" (1965); "The Inescapable Word" (1965); "The Sign of the Claw" (1965); "Sibao" (1965); "The Crime of the Century" (1965); "The Crooked Ring" (1965); "The Man Who Could Not Die" (1965); "Invitation to Danger" (1968); "The Desperate Diplomat" (1968); "The Time to Die" (1968); "Where the Money Is" (1968)	
1965	Out of the Unknown	BBC	"The Fox and the Forest"; written by Nation, based on Ray Bradbury's short story, with additional material by Meade Roberts	
1966–1967	The Baron	ATV for ITV	17 episodes: "Epitaph for a Hero" (1966); "Something for a Rainy Day" (1966); ‘Red Horse, Red Rider’ (1966); "Masquerade"/"The Killing" (1966); "And Suddenly You’re Dead" (1966); co-written with Dennis Spooner; "Portrait of Louisa" (1966); "There’s Someone Close Behind You" (1966); co-written with Dennis Spooner; "Storm Warning"/"The Island" (1967); "A Memory of Evil" (1967); co-written with Dennis Spooner; "The Seven Eyes of Night" (1967); ‘"Night of the Hunter" (1967); "So Dark the Night" (1967); co-written with Dennis Spooner; "Roundabout" (1967); "The Man Outside" (1967); "Countdown" (1967)	
1968–1969	The Avengers	Thames for ITV	6 episodes: "Legacy of Death" (1968); "Noon-Doomsday" (1968); "Invasion of the Earthmen" (1968); "Take Me to Your Leader" (1969); "Thingumajig" (1969); "Take-Over" (1969)	
1968–1969	The Champions	ITV	2 episodes: "The Fanatics" (1968); "The Body Snatchers" (1969)	
1969	Department S	ATV for ITV	2 episodes: "A Cellar Full of Silence"; "The Man in the Elegant Room"	
1971–1972	The Persuaders!	ATV for ITV	7 episodes: "Take Seven" (1971); "Someone Like Me" (1971); written by Nation from a story by Robert S. Baker; "Chain of Events" (1971); "A Home of One’s Own" (1971); "Five Miles to Midnight"; "A Death in the Family" (1972); "Someone Waiting" (1972)	
1972	The Incredible Robert Baldick	BBC	"Never Come Night"; Television pilot in the series Drama Playhouse	
1973–1974	The Protectors	ATV for ITV	"Bagman" (1973); "Baubles, Bangles and Beads" (1973); "Route 27" (1974); "A Pocketful of Posies" (1974)	
1974	Thriller	ATV for ITV	"K is for Killing" (known as "Color Him Dead" in the US); co-written with Brian Clemens	
1975	Survivors	BBC	7 episodes: "The Fourth Horseman"; "Genesis"; "Gone Away"; "Garland's War"; "The Future Hour"; "Something of Value"; "A Beginning"	
1978–1980	Blake's 7	BBC	19 episodes: "The Way Back" (1978); "Space Fall" (1978); "Cygnus Alpha" (1978); "Time Squad" (1978); "The Web" (1978); "Seek-Locate-Destroy" (1978); "Mission to Destiny" (1978); "Duel" (1978); "Project Avalon" (1978); "Breakdown" (1978); "Bounty" (1978); "Deliverance" (1978); "Orac" (1978); "Redemption" (1979); "Pressure Point" (1979); "Countdown" (1979); "Aftermath" (1980); "Powerplay" (1980); "Terminal" (1980)	
1985	MacGyver	ABC (US)	"The Golden Triangle"; opening gambit written by Nation; "Thief of Budapest"; opening gambit co-written with Stephen Downing; "Target MacGyver"; opening gambit written by Nation	
1986	A Masterpiece of Murder	NBC	Television film; co-written with Andrew J. Fenady	
1989	A Fine Romance	ABC (US)	"The Tomas Crown Affair"	

== Feature films ==
Year	Title	Production company	Director	Notes	Ref.
1960	And the Same to You	Monarch Productions	George Pollock	Screenplay by John Paddy Carstairs, adapted from The Chigwell Chicken by A.P. Dearsley, with additional material by John Junkin and Nation	
1961	What a Whopper	Viscount Films	Gilbert Gunn	Based on an idea by Trevor Peacock and Jeremy Lloyd	
1965	Dr. Who and the Daleks	Amicus	Gordon Flemyng	Screenplay by Milton Subotsky, based on Nation's The Daleks (1963-4)	
1966	Daleks' Invasion Earth 2150 A.D.	Amicus	Gordon Flemyng	Screenplay by Milton Subotsky with additional material by David Whitaker, based on Nation's The Dalek Invasion of Earth (1964)	
1970	And Soon the Darkness	Associated British Productions	Robert Fuest	Screenplay by Brian Clemens and Nation	
1973	The House in Nightmare Park	Associated London Films/Extonation	Peter Sykes	Screenplay by Clive Exton and Nation	

== Radio ==
Year	Title	Broadcaster	Producer	Notes	Ref.
1955	All My Eye and Kitty Bluett	BBC	Alastair Scott Johnston	13-week series written by Nation and Dick Barry	
1955	The Frankie Howerd Show	BBC	Alastair Scott Johnston	Nation and Dick Barry contributed to the 1955 series	
1956–1957	Floggit's	BBC	Alastair Scott Johnston and Bill Gates	35 episodes written by Nation, John Junkin and Dave Freeman	
1957	Calling the Stars	BBC	John Simmonds	One episode written by Nation and John Junkin	
1957–1958	Variety Playhouse	BBC	Alastair Scott Johnston	1957 series written by Nation and John Junkin; wrote further sketches in 1958 series	
1958	Fine Goings On	BBC	Bill Worsley	1958 series written by Nation and John Junkin	
1961	It's a Fair Cop	BBC	Herbert Smith	8-week series written by John Junkin and Nation	

== Literature ==
Year	Title	Fist edition publisher	Notes	Ref.
1964	The Dalek Book	Souvenir/Panther	Co-written with David Whitaker	
1965	The Dalek World	Souvenir/Panther	Co-written with David Whitaker	
1965	The Dalek Pocketbook and Space-Travellers Guide	Souvenir/Panther		
1966	The Dalek Outer Space Book	Souvenir/Panther	Co-written with Brad Ashton	
1975	Rebecca's World: Journey to the Forbidden Planet	G. Whizzard/Andre Deutsch		
1976	Doctor Who and the Daleks Omnibus	Artus	Co-written with Terrance Dicks	
1976	Survivors	Weidenfeld & Nicolson		
1988	The Official Doctor Who and the Daleks Book	St Martin's Press	Co-written with John Peel	

=== Short stories ===
Year	Title	First edition publisher	Notes	Ref.
1973	We Are the Daleks!	BBC	Radio Times Doctor Who Special	
1974	Daleks: The Secret Invasion	Evening News	Republished in Terry Nation's Dalek Special (Target, 1979)	

== Stage ==
Year	Title	Venue	Notes	Ref.
1956	Off the Cuff	Irving Theatre, London	15-minute sketch as part of revue	
1965	The Curse of the Daleks	Wyndham's Theatre	Co-written with David Whitaker	
