= Shubik =

Shubik is the surname of the following people

- Irene Shubik (1929–2019), British television producer
- Martin Shubik (1926–2018), American economist, brother of Irene and Philippe
  - Shubik model of the movement of goods and money in markets
  - Shapley–Shubik power index to measure the powers of players in a voting game
- Philippe Shubik (1921–2004), British-born American cancer researcher, brother of Irene and Martin
