= The Jewel in the Crown (TV series) =

1984 British television series

- Title card
- Genre: Historical drama
- Based on: The Raj Quartet by: Paul Scott
- Written by: Ken Taylor; Irene Shubik
- Directed by: Christopher Morahan; Jim O'Brien
- Starring: Art Malik; Geraldine James; Saeed Jaffrey; Peggy Ashcroft; Charles Dance; Tim Pigott-Smith; Eric Porter; Susan Wooldridge; Nicholas Le Prevost
- Composer: George Fenton
- Country of origin: United Kingdom
- Original languages: English; Hindi
- No. of episodes: 14

Production
- Production location: Mashobra; Udaipur; Mysore, India; Kashmir; Manchester, England
- Running time: 13.5 hours (53 minutes per episode; first episode double-length)
- Production company: Granada Television

Original release
- Network: ITV
- Release: 9 January – 3 April 1984

The Jewel in the Crown is a 1984 British epic historical drama television serial produced by Granada Television and originally aired on the ITV network. It is an adaptation of Paul Scott's Raj Quartet of novels about the final days of the British rule in India in India during and after World War II, and is named after the first novel in the series.

The 14-part serial was directed by Jim O'Brien and Christopher Morahan, and starred an ensemble cast featuring Art Malik, Geraldine James, Saeed Jaffrey, Peggy Ashcroft, Charles Dance, Tim Pigott-Smith, Eric Porter, Susan Wooldridge, Zia Mohyeddin, Kamini Kaushal, Om Puri and Nicholas Le Prevost. The musical score was composed by George Fenton.

The serial originally aired between 9 January and 3 April 1984. It won five British Academy Television Awards in 1985, including for Best Drama Series, Best Actor (for Pigott-Smith) and Best Actress (for Ashcroft). In the United States, where it aired on PBS' Masterpiece Theatre programme, it won the Golden Globe Award for Best Limited Series and the Primetime Emmy Award for Outstanding Limited Series. It has been acclaimed as "the high-water mark of 1980s British TV."

== Plot ==
The serial opens in the midst of World War II in the fictional Indian city of Mayapore, against the backdrop of the last years of the British Raj and the Indian independence movement. Hari Kumar is a young Indian man who was educated at Chillingborough, a British public school; he identifies as English rather than Indian. The bankruptcy of his father, a formerly successful businessman, forces him to return to India to live with his aunt.

Working as a journalist, Kumar now has a lower social status in India, and lives between two worlds, British and Indian. Numerous Anglo-Indians discriminate against him, and he is held in some suspicion by Indian independence activists. During this time, violent anti-British demonstrations take place in the city. Hari becomes romantically involved with Daphne Manners, a young British woman who shows an egalitarian attitude to Indians. One night, after Hari and Daphne make love in the public Bibighar Gardens, a group of Indian men attack them. Hari is beaten and Daphne is gang-raped.

Ronald Merrick, a young middle-class Englishman, is the bigoted, hardworking local Indian Police superintendent. He once professed romantic interest in Daphne, who politely but firmly rebuffed him. He arrests Hari for her rape, holding him in the local jail. Hari is beaten and sexually humiliated. Merrick resents Hari's privileged education and disdains Daphne's preference for him. When Daphne refuses to cooperate with the investigation, the police do not prosecute Hari for rape. But Hari and other young, educated Indians are jailed without trial under the security regulations adopted to suppress the Indian independence movement. Word that the prisoners have been tortured outrages the Indian community. Merrick is transferred from Mayapore to a smaller, less important town in the province.

Daphne learns she is pregnant. She chooses to believe Hari is the father, rather than one of the rapists. She dies in childbirth. The mixed-race daughter, Parvati, is taken in by Daphne's great-aunt, Lady Manners, widow of a former provincial governor. While Lady Manners takes the infant to the resort area of Srinagar, she meets Sarah Layton, a young British woman holidaying with her mother, Mildred, and sister, Susan. Sarah's and Susan's father is the colonel of the Indian Army regiment in Pankot, a hill station near Mayapore. He is being held as a prisoner of war in Germany, after his unit was captured early in the war. Susan and their mother prefer to stay away from Lady Manners due to the scandal of her great-niece's illegitimate birth, but Sarah pays a call on Lady Manners and the two women become friendly.

Sarah and her family soon encounter Merrick, who has left the police and procured a commission in the Indian Army. Teddie Bingham, an Indian Army officer and the fiancé of Sarah's sister Susan, is stationed in the nearby princely state of Mirat; Merrick, also assigned there, happens to share quarters with him. Because the unit is soon to leave for the border with Burma, Teddie and Susan have to marry in Mirat. When Teddie's best man for the ceremony becomes ill, he asks Merrick to step in. Merrick, seeing a relationship with the upper-class Teddie and the Laytons as a means to career advancement, is pleased to help. While Merrick and Teddie are driving to the ceremony, a stone is thrown at their car, slightly injuring Teddie. Merrick understands that he was the target of the attack, as this is one of a series of incidents suggesting he is being harassed because of his treatment of Hari and the other suspects in the rape case in Mayapore.

Shortly after the wedding, Teddie and Merrick leave for the Burma front with their unit. Teddie is soon killed in an ambush by the Japanese-sponsored Indian National Army (INA). Merrick is badly wounded trying to get Teddie to safety and is evacuated to a Calcutta hospital. When Sarah visits him (at Susan's request), she learns that his arm will be amputated and that his burned face is permanently disfigured. Merrick says that Teddie was ambushed because of him. Teddie had left their unit to try to persuade two Indian soldiers of his regiment, who had been captured by the Japanese and joined the INA, to surrender and come in. Merrick believes Teddie wanted to prove to him that the Indian soldiers would resume their loyalty to the British when given the chance.

Lady Manners presses for a formal inquiry into Hari's arrest and detention. Nigel Rowan, an aide to the governor of the province, interviews Hari, who learns from him that Daphne died. After Rowan establishes that Merrick tortured Hari and there is no evidence of wrongdoing, he arranges Hari's release. No action is taken against Merrick.

After convalescing, Merrick is promoted and assigned to intelligence activities concerning the INA and Indian soldiers who collaborated with the enemy. He comes across the Laytons again in Bombay, where Sarah is reunited with her father, Colonel Layton, just released from a German POW camp. Merrick is there to interrogate an Indian soldier who served under Colonel Layton, assisted the Germans after Layton's unit was captured, and has been deported to India. Merrick gains assistance from Sergeant Guy Perron, a young Cambridge graduate and Indian history scholar, who was serving with an Intelligence Corps Field Security unit; he speaks fluent Urdu and is asked to observe the interrogation. Merrick learns that Perron also attended Chillingborough and knew Hari.

After the interrogation, Perron runs into Merrick and Sarah Layton at a party. He accompanies them to Layton's aunt's apartment, where Sarah and her father are staying temporarily. Sarah and Perron are attracted to each other. Merrick decides to have Perron assigned to assist him in further investigations of Indian soldiers who became collaborators. Perron and Sarah both find Merrick distasteful, but Perron has no choice but to work with him.

After her husband Teddie's death and a difficult birth of their son, Susan Layton Bingham suffers a mental breakdown. She is treated in a hospital in Pankot. When Merrick returns to the Pankot area for his work, he courts Susan and ultimately marries her. Perron later learns that Merrick illegally gained access to Susan's medical records, apparently to learn about her mental state in order to persuade her to marry him. Susan's sister, Sarah, opposes the marriage, but is unable to prevent it.

With the surrender of Japan in August 1945, the war in the East ends, and the days of British rule in India are clearly numbered. Perron arranges a quick exit from the Army to return to Cambridge and his academic career. Due to his imminent departure, he and Sarah consummate and suspend their relationship. Sarah's parents also plan to return to England. Merrick intends to stay on, having been offered a contract by the government of Mirat to reorganize their police force.

In 1947, with the transition to Indian independence under way, Perron returns to India as a historical observer. The conflict between Hindus and Muslims related to independence is tense. While visiting Mirat at the invitation of its Chief Minister, Count Bronowsky, whom he previously met in Bombay, Perron learns that Merrick is dead, officially from a riding accident. Bronowsky tells Perron that Merrick actually died during a sexual rendezvous with a young Indian man who was probably working for independence activists. It is believed the man allowed an assassin access to Merrick. The authorities cover up the details of Merrick's death, fearing reprisals from Indians during the political uncertainty with the British departure. The two discuss their view that, in leaving India, the British are opening up "Pandora's Box", releasing the ancient competition for power between Hindus and Muslims, who had earlier conquered and ruled the country. Some confrontations had been restrained by the power of the British as rulers.

Sarah, Susan, and their aunt attend Merrick's funeral in Mirat. Perron accompanies them, along with Merrick's ashes, on the train back to Pankot. Joining them is Ahmed Kasim, the educated son of a prominent Muslim politician who has been working for Bronowsky in Mirat, and with whom Sarah has shared an intimate friendship after their meeting at Susan's wedding to Teddie years before. En route to Pankot, the train is stopped by Hindus, who attack Muslim passengers in retaliation for recent attacks on Hindus in Mirat. The attackers demand that Kasim be turned over to them. Kasim voluntarily leaves the train car and surrenders himself to the attackers, who murder him. Sarah, Perron, and the other English passengers are unharmed, but are horrified by the slaughter of Kasim and other Muslim passengers.

Before leaving India again, Perron tries to visit Hari, now living in a poor neighbourhood and supporting himself by tutoring Indian students in English. He leaves his calling card, as Hari is out. Perron reflects on how Hari was caught in an impossible position, between England and India.

== Cast ==
Main cast members

- Tim Pigott-Smith as Ronald Merrick (ep. 1–6, 8–14)
- Susan Wooldridge as Daphne Manners (ep. 1–3)
- Art Malik as Hari Kumar (ep. 1–2, 5, 13)
- Marne Maitland as Pandit Baba (ep. 2, 4)
- Judy Parfitt as Mildred Layton (ep. 3–9, 11–12)
- Geraldine James as Sarah Layton (ep. 3–14)
- Wendy Morgan as Susan Layton (ep. 3–9, 11–14)
- Nicholas Farrell as Edward "Teddie" Bingham (ep. 3–6)
- Anna Cropper as Nicky Paynton (ep. 3, 5, 8–9)
- Fabia Drake as Mabel Layton (ep. 3, 5–7)
- Saeed Jaffrey as Ahmed Ali Gaffur Kasim Bahadur, the Nawab of Mirat (ep. 4, 13)
- Nicholas Le Prevost as Captain Nigel Rowan (ep. 5, 8, 11–14)
- Stuart Wilson as Major James Clark (ep. 6–7)
- Zia Mohyeddin as Mohammad Ali Kasim (ep. 8, 11–12)
- Warren Clarke as Corporal "Sophie" Dixon (ep. 8, 11–12)
- Frederick Treves as Lieutenant Colonel John Layton (ep. 10–12)
- Charles Dance as Sergeant Guy Perron (ep. 10–14)
- Peter Jeffrey as Mr Peabody (ep. 14)

Special guest stars

- Peggy Ashcroft as Barbara Batchelor (ep. 3, 5–9, 11)
- Rachel Kempson as Lady Manners (ep. 3, 5–6, 8–9)
- Rosemary Leach as Fenella "Fenny" Grace (ep. 4–6, 9–10, 13–14)
- Eric Porter as Count Dmitri Bronowsky (ep. 4, 8, 10, 13–14)

Supporting cast members

- Janet Henfrey as Edwina Crane
- Derrick Branche as Ahmed Kasim
- Ralph Arliss as Captain Samuels
- Geoffrey Beevers as Captain Kevin Coley
- James Bree as Major/Lieutenant Colonel Arthur Grace
- Jeremy Child as Robin White
- Rowena Cooper as Connie White
- Matyelok Gibbs as Sister Ludmila Smith
- Carol Gillies as Clarissa Peplow
- Rennee Goddard as Dr Anna Klaus
- Jonathan Haley and Nicholas Haley as Edward Bingham Jr
- Karan Kapoor as Colin Lindsey
- Rashid Karapiet as Judge Menen
- Kamini Kaushal as Shalini Sengupta
- David Leland as Capt Leonard Purvis
- Jamila Massey as Maharanee Aimee
- Salmaan Peerzada as Sayed Kasim
- Om Puri as Mr de Souza
- Stephen Riddle as Capt Dicky Beauvais
- Norman Rutherford as Edgar Maybrick
- Dev Sagoo as S.V. Vidyasagar
- Zohra Sehgal as Lady Lili Chatterjee
- Leslie Grantham as Signals Sergeant
- Siddharth Kak as Rajendra Singh

== Episodes ==
The following titles are as given on the DVD release. The first episode is double-length (105 minutes). All others are 53 minutes.

No.	Title	Directed by	Written by	Original release date
1	"Crossing the River"	Christopher Morahan	Paul Scott (novel)/Ken Taylor (screenplay)	9 January 1984
Daphne Manners arrives in India for the first time and meets Hari Kumar.
2	"The Bibighar Gardens"	Christopher Morahan	Paul Scott (novel)/Ken Taylor (screenplay)	10 January 1984
The controversy around Daphne's and Hari's relationship escalates to a surprising degree.
3	"Questions of Loyalty"	Not shown	Paul Scott (novel)/Ken Taylor (screenplay)	17 January 1984
Hari remains in prison while Daphne gives birth.
4	"Incidents at a Wedding"	Christopher Morahan	Paul Scott (novel)/Ken Taylor (screenplay)	24 January 1984
Merrick serves as best man at Teddy's and Susan's wedding.
5	"The Regimental Silver"	Jim O'Brien	Paul Scott (novel)/Ken Taylor (screenplay)	31 January 1984
Susan prepares to celebrate her 21st birthday.
6	"Ordeal by Fire"	Christopher Morahan	Paul Scott (novel)/Ken Taylor (screenplay)	7 February 1984
Merrick reveals the details of Teddy's death.
7	"Daughters of the Regiment"	Christopher Morahan & Jim O'Brien	Paul Scott (novel)/Ken Taylor (screenplay)	14 February 1984
Sarah is the centre of attention when she visits Aunt Fenny.
8	"The Day of the Scorpion"	Jim O'Brien	Paul Scott (novel)/Ken Taylor (screenplay)	21 February 1984
Sarah meets the Count while travelling home.
9	"The Towers of Silence"	Christopher Morahan	Paul Scott (novel)/Ken Taylor (screenplay)	28 February 1984
Barbie falls ill after a visit to the home of Captain Coley.
10	"An Evening at the Maharanee's"	Jim O'Brien	Paul Scott (novel)/Ken Taylor (screenplay)	6 March 1984
Merrick interrogates some suspected traitors.
11	"Travelling Companions"	Christopher Morahan	Paul Scott (novel)/Ken Taylor (screenplay)	13 March 1984
Sarah is promoted to Sergeant.
12	"The Moghul Room"	Jim O'Brien	Paul Scott (novel)/Ken Taylor (screenplay)	20 March 1984
Perron investigates the secrets in Merrick's past.
13	"Pandora's Box"	Christopher Morahan	Paul Scott (novel)/Ken Taylor (screenplay)	27 March 1984
Susan struggles to regain her balance after Merrick's accident.
14	"A Division of the Spoils"	Jim O'Brien	Paul Scott (novel)/Ken Taylor (screenplay)	3 April 1984
Merrick's demise is recounted in full.

== Soundtrack ==
The Jewel in the Crown

Soundtrack album by Anthony Randall and Orchestra
- Released: 1985
- Label: Chrysalis

The Jewel in the Crown is a soundtrack album by Anthony Randall and Orchestra performing the compositions of George Fenton that appeared in the miniseries, released in 1985. It was originally released on LP by Chrysalis Records and subsequently reissued on CD by EMI.

=== Track listing ===
All compositions by George Fenton

1. ”Jewel in the Crown – Main Theme” – 2:32
2. ”The Lakes” – 1:57
3. ”The Triangle” – 3:48
4. ”Crossing the River” – 2:22
5. ”Imprisoned” – 2:03
6. ”Death by Fire” – 2:35
7. Chillingborough School Song” – 1:47
8. ”Butterflies Caught in a Web” – 4:25
9. ”Daphne & Hari” – 3:44
10. ”Mirat, Princely State” – 3:25
11. ”Kedara and Waltz Kedara” – 6:12
12. ”Barbie Leaves Rose Cottage/Champagne Charlie” – 2:30
13. ”Guy Perron’s March” – 2:09
14. ”Pankot - The Hills” – 3:02
15. ”Jewel in the Crown – End Titles” – 1:50

=== Personnel ===
- George Fenton – arranger
- Anthony Randall – conductor
- Gavyn Wright – leader
- Clem Alford – sitar
- Clive Bell – flute
- Nicholas Maigrel – sarangui
- Keshav Sathe – tabla
- Leslie Pearson – piano on “Butterflies Caught in a Web”
- Michale Jeans – Cor anglais on “Daphne & Hari”

== Production ==
Sir Denis Forman, then chairman of Granada Productions, wrote in 1983 that the impetus for adapting the Raj Quartet was the success of Scott's novel Staying On. The decision was made to attempt to adapt the Quartet series, but first test the company's ability to successfully complete a production in India by adapting Staying On. With the success of that television film, plans proceeded for the Quartet project.

The series was shot on 16mm film, much of it on location in India. The scenes of the Nawab of Mirat's palace were filmed at Lake Palace in Udaipur. Besides all the Mirat scenes, Udaipur was also the location for Mayapore and some Pankot scenes. Mashobra was the primary location (it was filmed in Khushwant Singh's ancestral property) and many scenes were filmed in Mysore and Kashmir.

All filming not in India was at Manchester's Granada Studios. The programme was often screened from grainy prints, but was fully remastered for its 2005 DVD release and ITV3 screening, resulting in much better picture quality.

=== Adaptation ===
The series is based on the Raj Quartet novels by Paul Scott:

- The Jewel in the Crown (1966)
- The Day of the Scorpion (1968)
- The Towers of Silence (1971)
- A Division of the Spoils (1975)

While the novels are written from different characters' viewpoints and move back and forth in time, the adaptation places events in roughly chronological order.

=== Cast ===
The series made stars of Art Malik and Charles Dance. Other leading actors included Peggy Ashcroft (who won the BAFTA Best TV Actress award for her performance), Tim Pigott-Smith, Geraldine James, Judy Parfitt, Rachel Kempson, Eric Porter, Susan Wooldridge, Zohra Sehgal, Saeed Jaffrey, and Karan Kapoor. The plot's complexities ensured that no one character was at the centre of the action throughout. All four "Best TV Actress" nominations at that year's BAFTAs went to stars of the series, with Ashcroft winning over Wooldridge, James and Parfitt. Pigott-Smith won Best TV Actor.

In a list of the 100 Greatest British Television Programmes compiled by the British Film Institute in 2000 and voted by industry professionals, The Jewel in the Crown placed 22nd.

== Broader context ==
According to the Museum of Broadcast Communications there was "a cycle of film and television productions which emerged during the first half of the 1980s, which seemed to indicate Britain's growing preoccupation with India, Empire and a particular aspect of British cultural history". In addition to The Jewel in the Crown, this cycle included Gandhi (1982), Heat and Dust (1983), The Far Pavilions (1984) and A Passage to India (1984).

Charles Dance remarked in 2011 that it has a devout following to this day. "I think that aired here in 1983, and there are people still to this day who assemble in each other’s houses and have Jewel In The Crown weekends and watch all 14 hours, mostly in America," he told Attention Deficit Delirium. "I have people stopping me in the street now saying that they watched Jewel In The Crown again a couple of months ago, and I think, 'Bloody hell, did you really?' So I’m known to that generation for a completely different type of work. The current film and television viewing audience is much younger, and the kind of things that I’m known for are these rather off-the-wall, slightly villainous characters in fantastical film and television things, but that’s okay. It’s better to be looked over than to be overlooked in my business."

== Reception ==
In contemporary reviews, John J. O'Connor of The New York Times wrote, "the careful accumulation of marvelous detail is never less than fascinating. And once again in a British production, the performances are rarely less than extraordinary... What emerges in the end is a comprehension of India far more convincing than the posturings of a Rudyard Kipling and far deeper than the tightly focused biography of a Gandhi. The Jewel in the Crown is not only engrossing television. It is important television, a model of what the medium can do." Jeff Jarvis of People magazine called it "first-rate; the settings are stunning. It does a masterly job of making you care about its characters and what happens to them. That is what a mini-series is supposed to do, and Jewel does a spectacular job of it. It is this year’s best fictional mini." The Washington Post called the series "Ravishing, reverberant and profoundly sad" and wrote, "The inscrutability of India to outsiders is not romanticized, just contemplated, celebrated, just as its intoxicating physical beauty is."

In reviewing the box-set video in 2010, Alexandra Coghlan of The Guardian wrote that the series "sits alongside Brideshead Revisited as the high-water mark of 1980s British TV."

Preceded by Kennedy	British Academy Television Awards; Best Drama Series or Serial; 1985	Succeeded by Edge of Darkness
