= Jiffs =

Jiffs was a slang term used by British Intelligence, and later the 14th Army, to denote soldiers of the Indian National Army after the failed First Arakan offensive of 1943. The term is derived from the acronym JIFC, short for Japanese-Indian (or -inspired) fifth column. It came to be employed in a propaganda offensive in June 1943 within the British Indian Army as a part of the efforts to preserve the loyalty of the Indian troops at Manipur after suffering desertion and losses at Burma during the First Arakan Offensive. After the end of the war, the term "HIFFs" (from Hitler-inspired-fifth-columnists) was also used for repatriated troops of the Indian Legion awaiting trial.

== Background ==
The prestige of the Raj had suffered a blow with the fall of British Malaya and, later, the massive surrender at Singapore. In February 1942, the Indian prisoners of war from the British Indian Army captured there came under the influence of Indian nationalists, notably Mohan Singh Deb, and a large number volunteered to form the Indian National Army with support from Japan and had the stated aim of overthrowing The Raj from India. Of the formation of this army however, the British intelligence was unaware of until around July 1942, and even then was unclear on the scale, purpose and organisation of the INA.

Intelligence summaries initially did not believe the INA to be a substantial force or have any purpose more than propaganda and espionage purposes. However, by the end of 1942, they had become aware of trained Indian espionage agents (of the INAs Special services group) who had infiltrated into India for the purpose of collecting intelligence, subversion of the army and the subversion of civilian loyalty. These information were derived to a large extent from some of the agents themselves who gave themselves up to the authorities after reaching India. However, the intelligence was also aware at this point of misinformation being spread about the INA itself by the agents who concealed their purpose and professed to pass on intelligence from local knowledge. More troubling for the military command were the activities of the INA agents in the battlefields of India's eastern frontier in Burma.

Around this time, the Quit India movement had reached a crescendo within India, while the continuing British reversals at Burma further affected the morale of the army. Irwin's First Campaign had been contained and then beaten back by inferior Japanese forces at Donbaik. Intelligence analysis of the failure, as well as Irwin's own personal analysis of the campaign attributed significant demoralisation and rising discontentment amongst Indian troops due to the subversive activity of INA agents at the frontline, as well as rising nationalist (or “Pro-Congress”) sentiments. The activities of these agents were addressed at the Sepoys and these found enough support to successfully encourage defection without attracting the attention of the officers commanding the units. Soon, defection by British Indian troops had become a problem significant and regular enough in the Burma theatre to form a regular part of the intelligence summaries in the first half of 1943.

== Wren report ==
In December 1942, a certain Lt. Col G.W Wren attached to MI2 produced a report outlining the condition of loyalty of the Indian troops in the British Indian Army. Detailed intelligence on the INA, its organisation and the circumstances in which it was found became available at the time from sources defecting into India in the garb of INA agents. The Wren report, with inputs from these defectors, argued that to preserve the loyalty of the army, it was necessary to preserve the loyalty of the Indian officer corps. The report further argued that to counter the INA and the IIL's strategy, it was necessary for Whitehall to make specific commitments to the Indian independence movement that would address the political sentiments of the Indian recruits, and predicted that not doing so risked alienating the British Indian Army from the Raj.

Wren's analysis of the problems facing the British Indian Army, though highly controversial, was supported by later recommendations derived from Noel Irwin's reports following the Eastern Armies debacle at Arakan. Irwin's analysis further supported the notion that although the desertions by the Indian soldiers at Arakan were alarming, it was a purely military problem, and could be addressed to a large extent by making a declaration of a free or freer India similar to the US declaration for Philippines. However, Churchill's, as well as Linlithgow's opposition and outright hostility to any declaration that committed towards India's independence meant the Wren report went unimplemented.

== Jiffs campaign ==
By 1943 the INA is known to have been "target of utmost value". Wavell assigned a whole separate department to deal with it. Not willing to commit to a declaration of independence, and thus unable to implement the Wren report, The Raj chose instead to oppose the INA and the IIL strategy by employing propaganda measures that would ensure that little about the INA and Bose came to be known in India, and what did seep through was stressed to be as derisive, monstrous and loathsome as could be possible. The psychological warfare section of the India Command, known as GSI(q), was entirely dedicated to the JIFF propaganda under Lt Colonel Hunt working with Cawthorne.

=== JIFFs ===
The first of the measures taken was to emphasise a news blackout on the existence of the INA from newspapers, book or any publications. Not until after a few days after the fall of Rangoon two years later was this ban to be lifted. Among other policies adopted at the time were the decisions to only refer to the INA "Traitor Army", which was later superseded by the use of the term Jiffs.

=== Josh ===
At the same time, policies were adopted that saw the formation of "Josh Groups" to preserve morale of the Indian troops and engage greater co-operation among European officers and Indian troops. Amongst other decision, meetings of the Josh groups were used as a platform to circulate stories of Japanese atrocities on Prisoners of War and the occupied countries, as well as associate the INA troops to these atrocities. Every commanding officer of every British-Indian Army unit were instructed to create a Josh group. Through the activities of these groups, any antipathy the Sepoy may have for "Britishers" would be paled by the hatred that was to be fanned for the Japanese. As Gajendra Singh notes, the work of Josh groups aimed to:

- Build in every Indian soldier the firm belief that the Japanese and everyone who worked with the Japanese were the Sepoy's own "personal enemies"....
- Introduce stories of British victories against the Japanese, which would turn the conversation around to why Japanese were enemies of India and how they would be defeated.
- Introduce stories of bravery of Indian soldiers in comradeship-in-arms with allies.
- Use entertainment, radio, drama and picture-layouts to impress on the Sepoy that his chief enemy in existence is the Japanese.
- Provide sound information to the Indian soldiers to counteract Japanese and INA propaganda.

Indian Captains or majors gave anti-Japanese and anti-Bose lectures in Urdu and Gurkhali to the troops, and emphasised India's stake in Britain's war aims. "Jap-orientation courses" were organised for Indian and British officers, under the stewardship of Indian officers led by "Jick" Rudra, Lt Himmatsinhji and Ali Noon (brother of Feroz Khan Noon.

=== CSDIC ===
In addition to implementing the Josh measures, the CSDIC(I) was expanded in November 1942 to identify men of the British-Indian Army who may already have been affected by the INA propaganda, and to interrogate captured INA men.

== Impact ==
These measures, along with measures to improve morale in the recruiting areas in Indian hinterland, began having palpable results. This was particularly so as victories began to be registered against the Japanese by the end of 1944. By the end of March 1945, the Sepoy of the British-Indian Army was reinvigorated, and perceived the men of the INA little more than savage turncoats and cowards. Senior British officers in the Indian army considered them "rabble". Historians Christopher Bayly and Tim Harper mention that many a times, the Sepoys in the field units shot captured or wounded INA men, relieving their British officers of the complex task of formulating a formal plan for captured men. After Singapore was retaken, Mountbatten ordered the INA's war memorial to its fallen soldiers to be blown up.

== Cultural references ==
The Day of the Scorpion and The Towers of Silence, second and third respectively of Paul Scott's Raj Quartet that mentions the term in the political and social context in which it found use in the Eastern Army during the war. The Glass Palace, a work of fiction by author Amitav Ghosh, explains the term and its use in chronicling the fictional life of a Rangoon Teak trader during the Japanese occupation of Burma.
