= A Division of the Spoils =

1975 book by Paul Scott

- First edition (UK)
- Author: Paul Scott
- Language: English
- Genre: Historical novel
- Publisher: Heinemann (UK); William Morrow (US)
- Publication date: 5 May 1975
- Publication place: United Kingdom
- Media type: Print (Hardback & Paperback)
- Pages: 640 pp (hardback edition)
- ISBN: 0-434-68111-3 (hardback edition)
- OCLC: 1529968
- Dewey Decimal: 823/.9/14
- LC Class: PZ4.S428 Di PR6069.C596
- Preceded by: The Towers of Silence
- Followed by: Staying On

A Division of the Spoils is the 1975 novel by Paul Scott. It is the fourth and final book of his Raj Quartet. The novel is set in the British Raj. It follows on from the storyline in The Jewel in the Crown, The Day of the Scorpion, and The Towers of Silence. Many of the events are retellings from different points of view of events that happened in the previous novels.

== Setting ==
The story is set in 1945 and 1947 in several locations throughout India, prior to and after Indian independence, particularly in an unnamed province of northern India. The province shares characteristics with Punjab and the United Provinces. The names of places and people suggest a connection to Bengal; however, the physical characteristics place the setting in north-central India, rather than in northeast India. The province has an agricultural plain and, in the north, a mountainous region.

The capital of the province is Ranpur. Another large city in the province is Mayapore, which was the key setting in The Jewel in the Crown. The princely state of Mirat is a nominally sovereign enclave within the province. Pankot is a "second class" hill station in the province which serves as a headquarters for the 1st Pankot Rifles, an important regiment of the Indian Army, who fought the Axis in North Africa. During the cool season, the regiment moves to Ranpur, on the plains. At Premanagar there is an old fortification that is used by the British as a prison. Another town, Muzzafirabad is the headquarters of the Muzzafirabad ("Muzzy") Guides, another Indian Army regiment, as well as the Bishop Barnard mission.

== Plot summary ==
The story covers in personal terms the humbling and hasty decamping of the British: the precipitous concession of power to a country fiercely bent on division; the travails of an honorable Muslim Congressman, Mohammed Ali Kasim, and his sons, one of whom had deserted to the Japan-directed Indian National Army; the quandary of the Nawab of the small fictitious princely state of Mirat, left in the lurch by the lapse of British Paramountcy; the suicide of a dysentery-debilitated and maladapted British officer; the prowling of the haunted Ronald Merrick. The new man on the scene is Sergeant Guy Perron, who was a pupil at a public school called Chillingborough, which Hari Kumar (as Harry Coomer) also attended when he lived in England. It is Guy who returns in 1947/8 to be an observer of India on the eve of Independence; this assignment soon turns into a personal inquiry into the truth behind the hushed-up story of Lieutenant-Colonel Ronald Merrick's death in Mirat. The tragic consequences of India-Pakistan partition are dramatized in a horrific train massacre in which Ahmed Kasim, the son of Mohammed Ali Kasim, is targeted by rioters and chooses to sacrifice himself in order to protect the rest of the people in his carriage.

== Critical reception ==
In a 1975 book review in Kirkus Reviews, an anonymous reviewer summarized the book as a "commanding achievement."
