= Terry Nation =

Welsh television writer (1930–1997)

- Born: 8 August 1930; Llandaff, Cardiff, Wales
- Died: 9 March 1997 (aged 66); Los Angeles, California, US
- Occupations: Screenwriter; novelist
- Years active: 1955–1997
- Notable work: Doctor Who; Survivors; Blake's 7
- Spouse: Kathleen Gaunt (m. 1968)
- Children: 2

Terence Joseph Nation (8 August 1930 – 9 March 1997) was a Welsh screenwriter and novelist. Best known for his work in British television science fiction, he created the Daleks and Davros for Doctor Who, as well as the series Survivors (1975–1977) and Blake's 7 (1978–1981).

Nation first made his name as a comedy writer before becoming a prolific writer for drama, working on many of the most popular British series of the 1960s and 1970s, such as The Avengers, The Baron, The Champions, Department S, The Persuaders! and The Saint. When Nation was commissioned to write The Daleks (1963) for Doctor Who, the villainous eponymous creatures established the series' early popularity. He later devised the recurring character of Davros in Genesis of the Daleks (1975). His series Survivors and Blake's 7 have been described as "much-loved cult TV classics".

== Early life ==
Terence Joseph Nation was born on 8 August 1930 at his parents' house in Llandaff, a suburb of Cardiff, Wales. He was the only child of Susan (née Harris) and Gilbert Joseph "Bert" Nation, an upholsterer and French polisher who later owned a furniture business and worked as a poultry farmer.

Nation was educated in Cardiff. He often played truant from school to attend screenings at his local cinema, recalling that he "grew up in the front row of the local Odeon". His father fought in the Second World War and his mother volunteered as an Air Raid Precautions warden.

== Career ==
=== 1955–1962: Radio comedy ===
Nation briefly worked as a travelling salesman in his father's furniture business, and wrote gags for the Welsh-produced BBC radio series Welsh Rarebit. Nation hoped to make a career as a stand-up comic, and in January 1955, he moved to London with his writing partner Dick Barry.

Nation's attempts at comedy performing were poorly received by audiences, and he was advised that though his material was good, he was a poor performer. He instead turned to a career as a comedy writer. He approached the BBC, who advised him to contact comedian Spike Milligan, who had co-founded the agency and writers' co-operative Associated London Scripts (ALS). Supposedly, Nation arrived to meet Milligan looking so undernourished that Milligan gave him £10 for a meal, then hired him to write a script for The Goon Show. Although Nation's script was never produced, he was taken on by ALS. He quickly became a prolific radio writer for various comedians.

Nation and Barry's first BBC Radio credit was for All My Eye and Kitty Bluett, a 1955 star vehicle made for Stanley Baxter and Terry Scott. They subsequently wrote for the 1955 series of Frankie Howerd's radio programme The Frankie Howerd Show. Barry emigrated to Australia in 1956; Nation formed a writing partnership with John Junkin. Nation and Junkin wrote for comedians including Frankie Howerd, Ted Ray and Eric Sykes. Nation also wrote for Peter Sellers, Jimmy Logan, Elsie and Doris Waters and Harry Worth. Nation also worked with writer Johnny Speight. Nation's first feature film credit was for contributing additional material to John Paddy Carstairs's screenplay for And the Same to You (1960). Nation's first produced film screenplay was What a Whopper (1961), a comedy directed by Gilbert Gunn about a struggling writer who fakes a sighting of the Loch Ness Monster.

Although Nation was not generally interested in writing for science fiction, in 1962, ALS writer Clive Exton suggested that Nation should contribute to Irene Shubik's new television science fiction anthology series Out of This World. Nation adapted Philip K. Dick's short story Impostor and Clifford D. Simak's novella Immigrant for the series, as well as contributing his original script "Botany Bay". Nation then returned to writing for comedy.

=== 1962–1970: Doctor Who ===
Nation had a lengthy professional association with comedian Tony Hancock.

In 1962, Nation contributed an adaptation of Ray Bradbury's short story "The Fox and the Forest" to the ITV science fiction television series Out of the Unknown. This led to him being included in a list of potential writers for the new BBC science fiction series Doctor Who.

Comic performer Tony Hancock sought new writers from ALS for his 1963 television series as he had sacked his previous writers Galton and Simpson. Nation wrote 3 episodes for Hancock, and subsequently wrote material for Hancock's 1963 tour. Nation initially refused the opportunity from script editor David Whitaker to write for Doctor Who as he was too busy writing for Hancock. Hancock had also given Nation the advice "Don't write for flippin' kids".

Nation accompanied Hancock on his 1963 tour. Hancock regularly neglected Nation's scripts in favour of recycling his old material, and was also a heavy drinker with erratic behaviour. The two men fell out, and Hancock sacked Nation. Now unemployed, Nation contacted Whitaker and accepted the offer. He hurriedly wrote a seven-episode serial for Doctor Who, known as The Daleks, and then went to Sweden to co-write a variety special for Eric Sykes. Nation called the Doctor Who job "the sort of thing where you take the money and fly off like a bat out of hell". Nation's first Doctor Who story, also known as The Mutants and The Dead Planet, introduced the Daleks, a villainous extraterrestrial race that quickly became the series' most popular and enduring monsters, and resulted in a major merchandising success for Nation and the BBC.

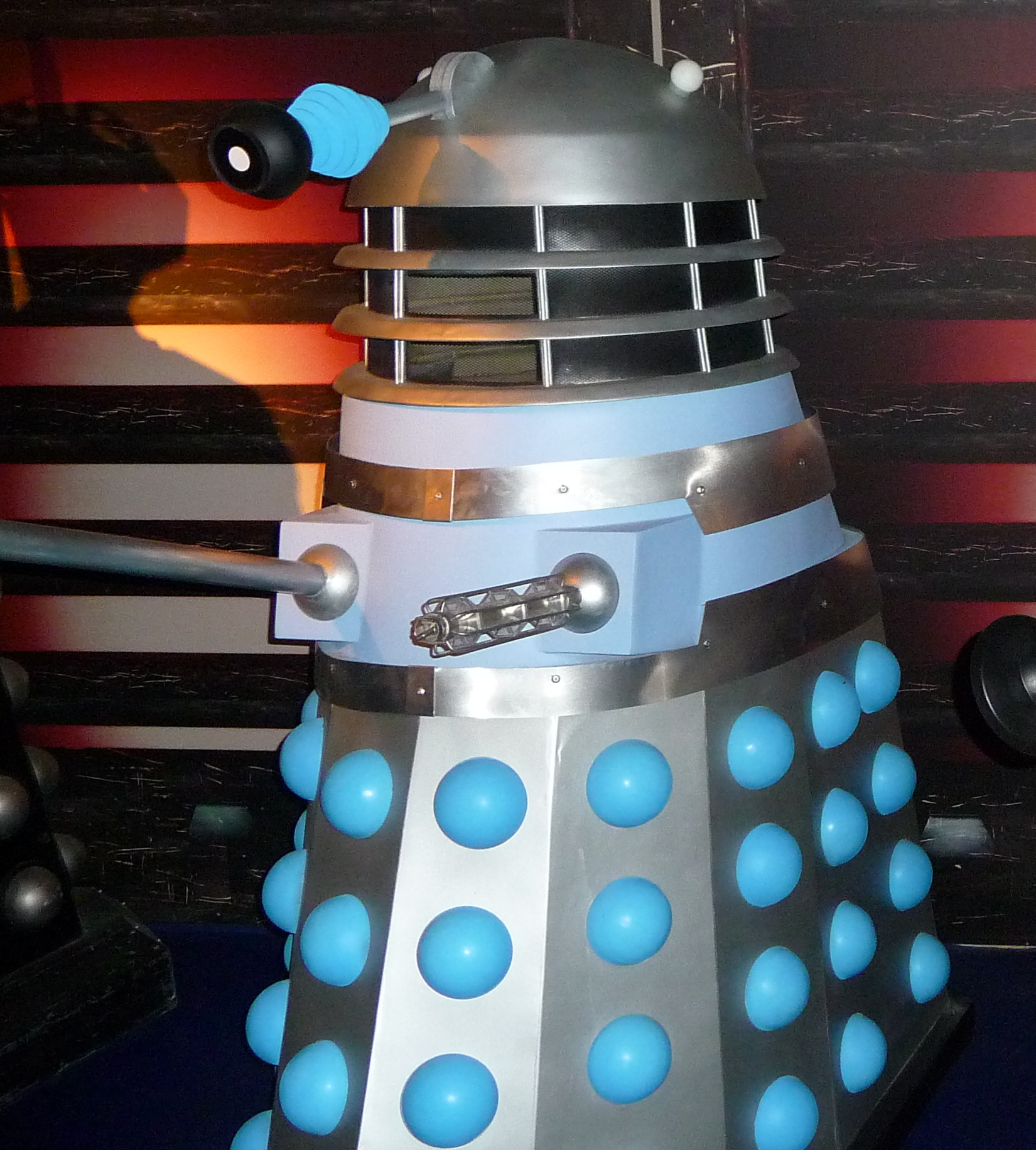
A model of the original Dalek design at the Doctor Who Experience

Nation contributed further scripts to Doctor Who. In 1965, he and Dennis Spooner co-wrote the 12-part serial The Daleks' Master Plan, after which Nation, who still held the copyright to the Daleks, attempted to launch a Dalek spin-off TV series in the United States. Various other Dalek tie-in material appeared, including comic strips in the children's weekly TV Century 21 and annuals; such material was frequently credited to Nation, even when written by others. Over the next few years, appearances by the Daleks in Doctor Who became less frequent and were written by other authors (Whitaker wrote The Power of the Daleks (1966) and The Evil of the Daleks (1967), and Louis Marks wrote Day of the Daleks (1972)).

Following an eight-year absence from the series, Nation returned to writing for the Daleks on Doctor Who with the Third Doctor serials Planet of the Daleks (1973) and Death to the Daleks (1974). Producer Barry Letts and script editor Terrance Dicks felt that the Dalek script Nation submitted for season 12 was too reminiscent of previous Dalek stories, and suggested that Nation rewrite the script to focus on the Daleks' origin. The resulting serial, Genesis of the Daleks, was voted the greatest Doctor Who story of all time by Doctor Who Magazine readers in 1998. In Genesis, Nation introduced the character of Davros, the creator of the Daleks, who went on to appear in further storylines. Nation also wrote two non-Dalek scripts for Doctor Who, The Keys of Marinus in 1964, which introduced the Voord, and The Android Invasion in 1975, which introduced the Kraals. Nation's final script for Doctor Who was Destiny of the Daleks, broadcast in 1979. His work on Doctor Who was the subject of the documentary Terror Nation, a special feature on the BBC DVD release of Destiny of the Daleks.

In 1969, when Out of the Unknown began to be produced in colour, Nation granted permission for the Daleks to be used in the series three episode "Get Off My Cloud", based on the story by Peter Phillips about a bed-bound science-fiction author who finds himself within one of his own fantasies after a mental breakdown. This would be the first time the Daleks had been shown in colour on television, although they had previously appeared in colour in the Peter Cushing films. Only production stills and low-quality audio extracts survive.

=== 1970–1980: Survivors and Blake's 7 ===
Having returned to writing for Doctor Who, the BBC commissioned Nation to create a new science-fiction drama series. First broadcast in 1975, Survivors is the post-apocalyptic story of the last humans on Earth after the world's population has been devastated by plague. Although the series was well received, Nation's creative vision conflicted with that of producer Terence Dudley, and the final two series were produced without Nation's involvement.

Meanwhile, screenwriter Brian Clemens claimed that he had related the concept for Survivors to Nation in the late 1960s while they were working together on the final series of The Avengers, with Clemens claiming to have registered the Survivors concept with the Writers' Guild of Great Britain in 1965; Nation denied the allegations. Although the case was ultimately brought before the High Court, both sides withdrew from the proceedings after their legal costs mounted.

The production of Nation's next BBC creation, Blake's 7, experienced fewer problems. This series follows a group of criminals and political prisoners who are on the run from the evil "Terran Federation", piloting a stolen spaceship of unknown origin. Blake's 7 ran for four series from 1978 to 1981. Although Nation scripted the whole of the first series of Blake's 7, his creative influence subsequently declined in the following two series despite writing some key episodes, as script editor Chris Boucher exerted a greater influence on those seasons. Nation didn't write any episodes in the fourth series of Blake's 7. In the 1980s, Nation attempted, without success, to secure funding for a fifth series of Blake's 7.

During the 1970s, Nation wrote a children's novel for his daughter Rebecca (after whom he named the character of Rebec in the 1973 Doctor Who serial Planet of the Daleks) titled Rebecca's World: Journey to the Forbidden Planet, as well as a novel based on Survivors.

=== 1980–1997: United States ===
In 1980, Nation moved to Los Angeles, where he developed programme ideas and worked for various production studios. Little of his work from this time was as successful as that of his earlier period in Britain. He wrote scripts for the hit TV series MacGyver (1985) and A Fine Romance (1989).

== Personal life ==
Nation married Kathleen "Kate" Gaunt (1935–2025), a classical pianist from Doncaster, on 29 March 1958 at St Mary The Boltons in West Brompton, London. The couple had a son and a daughter.

== Death ==
On 9 March 1997, Nation died from emphysema at his home in the Pacific Palisades district of Los Angeles, aged 66.

== Awards and nominations ==
| Year | Award | Work | Category | Result | Reference |
|---|---|---|---|---|---|
| 1975 | Writers' Guild of Great Britain Award | Doctor Who | Best Children's Drama Script (with Brian Hayles, Robert Holmes, Malcolm Hulke and Robert Sloman) | Won | |

In November 2013, Nation was commemorated with a blue plaque at the house in Cardiff where he was born.
