= Out of This World (British TV series) =

1962 British TV sci-fi anthology series

- Boris Karloff hosting Out of this World
- Created by: Irene Shubik
- Presented by: Boris Karloff
- Country of origin: United Kingdom
- Original language: English
- No. of series: 1
- No. of episodes: 13 (12 missing)

Production
- Producer: Leonard White
- Running time: 60 mins (with adverts)
- Production company: ABC Weekend TV (UK)

Original release
- Network: ITV
- Release: 30 June – 22 September 1962

Related
- Armchair Theatre

Out of This World is a British science fiction anthology television series made by the ITV franchise ABC Weekend TV for ITV. It was broadcast on ITV in 1962. A spin-off from the Armchair Theatre anthology series, each episode was introduced by the actor Boris Karloff. Many of the episodes were adaptations of stories by science fiction writers including Isaac Asimov, Philip K. Dick and Clifford D. Simak. The series is described by the British Film Institute as a precursor to the BBC science fiction anthology series Out of the Unknown, which was created and produced by Out of This World creator Irene Shubik after she left ABC.

Only one episode, "Little Lost Robot", exists today and is available on DVD. Two of the missing episodes, "Cold Equations" and "Impostor", have surviving audio soundtracks, which are also available on DVD. The "Cold Equations" soundtrack is complete, but the "Impostor" soundtrack is incomplete and runs at approximately 44 minutes.

== Origins ==
Series creator Irene Shubik joined ABC Television as a story editor on the anthology series Armchair Theatre under producer Sydney Newman in 1960. A science fiction fan since her university days, Shubik approached Newman during the summer of 1961 with the notion of making a science fiction version of Armchair Theatre, similar to the Armchair Mystery Theatre spin-off that specialised in crime and mystery stories. Shubik had already commissioned several borderline science fiction scripts for Armchair Theatre such as "The Omega Mystery" and "The Ship That Couldn't Stop". However, the production that acted as a template for what would become Out of This World was "Murder Club", an adaptation of Robert Sheckley’s short story The Seventh Victim, starring Richard Briers, that aired under the Armchair Theatre banner on 3 December 1961. Also around this time the BBC had scored a notable hit with the science fiction thriller A for Andromeda.

== Production ==
Shubik was appointed story editor and Leonard White, who had produced the first two seasons of The Avengers, was assigned to produce. Leonard found Out of This World a welcome antidote to The Avengers, which had proved a difficult production; he recalled, "It was a great pleasure to make, getting away from today and exploring the unrealities (or so we thought) of tomorrow. An opportunity for the suspension of disbelief even in the here and now ambiance of television". The budget for each episode averaged £5,000.

Shubik soon ran into difficulties finding material suitable for adaptation, a problem that had plagued earlier aborted attempts to get a similar series off the ground. A useful contact Shubik made was with John Carnell, a key figure in British science fiction, founder of the magazine New Worlds and agent for many British science fiction writers. Carnell assisted Shubik in selecting material and put her in contact with writers and publishers. Carnell also promoted the series heavily in New Worlds, giving it the cover of the July 1962 edition. When a strike by actor's union Equity hit production of Armchair Theatre, it bought Shubik the extra time she needed to find sufficient scripts. All but two episodes were adaptations of short stories and novels. Shubik took the name Out of This World from a series of anthology collections published by Blackie and Son, edited by Amabel Williams-Ellis.

The actor Boris Karloff, well known for his association with the horror film genre, was chosen as host for the new series. This was an idea taken from such U.S. anthology series as The Twilight Zone, Alfred Hitchcock Presents and Thriller (which Karloff himself had hosted) and was in line with what had been done for Armchair Mystery Theatre, which was introduced by Donald Pleasence.

Three scripts for Out of This World, adaptations of Philip K. Dick's "Impostor" and Clifford D. Simak's "Immigrant" as well as an original story called "Botany Bay", were supplied by Terry Nation, who would, a short time after, create the Daleks for Doctor Who. Nation's scripts were his first professional foray into science fiction, the genre for which he would become best known. Apart from a number of scripts for Doctor Who, Nation would go on to create the original science fiction series Survivors and Blake's 7.

== Broadcast and critical reception ==
Originally, an adaptation of John Wyndham’s short story "Dumb Martian" was intended to launch the series. Sydney Newman elected, though, to broadcast the story as part of Armchair Theatre the week before Out of This World would make its debut. The play ended with an epilogue by Boris Karloff introducing and previewing the new series.

The first episode, "The Yellow Pill", attracted 11 million viewers, placing Out of This World eleventh in the television ratings for that week and beating the popular police drama series Z-Cars.

Critical reaction to Out of This World was, on the whole, positive. A Kinematograph Weekly review said that the series was "the most intelligent and best written of its genre since Quatermass" while The Times said, "in general the level of writing and direction has been encouragingly high [...] Out of This World may well help to banish forever the view of the summer as a time when just anything will do". H. F. Hall, writing in the Yorkshire Evening Post, described Out of This World as "the most accomplished thing of its kind that TV has yet produced... well schemed scripting and disciplined production". One viewer who enjoyed the series was The Goon Show's Michael Bentine who sent a telegram to Leonard White conveying "joyous congratulations for wonderful entertainment".

== Influence ==
Although the series was judged a success, the departure of both Sydney Newman and Irene Shubik to the BBC meant that a second season was not made. However, while at the BBC Shubik devised and initially produced Out of the Unknown, another science fiction anthology series that, like Out of This World, concentrated mainly on adaptations of short stories and novels and ran for four seasons between 1965 and 1971. Two Out of This World scripts — "The Yellow Pill" and "Target Generation" — were remade by Out of the Unknown in its third season. Shubik went on to become a noted television producer of series such as The Wednesday Play, Play for Today, Playhouse: The Mind Beyond and Rumpole of the Bailey and instigated, but did not produce, the acclaimed adaptation of The Jewel in the Crown.

== Archive status ==
As was common practice among British broadcasters at the time, almost all of the episodes of Out of This World were wiped after broadcast and only "Little Lost Robot" is known to survive. Audio recordings of "Cold Equations" and "Imposter" exist, but no visual elements have survived and the "Imposter" audio is incomplete. The surviving episode and audio recordings were released on DVD by the British Film Institute in 2014.

== List of episodes ==
Thirteen episodes of Out of This World were broadcast on Saturday nights at 10 p.m. from 30 June 1962. The Armchair Theatre presentation of "Dumb Martian" is also included in this list for completeness as it was originally intended to be part of Out of This World, in line with most episode guides published for this series. Only one episode ("Little Lost Robot") is known to exist. Audio recordings of the episodes "Cold Equations" and "Imposter" exist. The "Cold Equations" audio recording is complete, but the "Impostor" audio recording is incomplete and runs for approximately 44 minutes.

Ep. No.	Title	Original short story	Adapted by	Director	Airdate
Made for Out of This World but broadcast as part of Armchair Theatre:
0	"Dumb Martian"	John Wyndham	Clive Exton	Charles Jarrot	24 June 1962
Broadcast as part of Out of This World:
1	"The Yellow Pill"	Rog Phillips	Leon Griffiths	Jonathan Alwyn	30 June 1962
2	"Little Lost Robot"	Isaac Asimov	Leo Lehman	Douglas James	7 July 1962
3	"Cold Equations"	Tom Godwin	Clive Exton	Paul Bernard	14 July 1962
4	"Impostor"	Philip K. Dick	Terry Nation	Peter Hammond	21 July 1962
5	"Botany Bay"	Terry Nation	N/A (original story)	Guy Verney	28 July 1962
6	"Medicine Show"	Robert Moore Williams	Julian Bond	Richmond Harding	4 August 1962
7	"Pictures Don't Lie"	Katherine Maclean	Bruce Stewart	John Knight	11 August 1962
8	"Vanishing Act"	Richard Waring	N/A (original story)	Don Leaver	18 August 1962
9	"Divided We Fall"	Raymond F. Jones	Leon Griffiths	John Knight	25 August 1962
10	"The Dark Star"	Frank Crisp (based on the novel Ape of London)	Denis Butler	Peter Hammond	1 September 1962
11	"Immigrant"	Clifford D. Simak	Terry Nation	Jonathan Alwyn	8 September 1962
12	"Target Generation"	Clifford D. Simak	Clive Exton	Alan Cooke	15 September 1962
13	"The Tycoons"	Arthur Sellings	Bruce Stewart	Charles Jarrot	22 September 1962
