= Staying On =

1977 book by Paul Scott

- First edition
- Author: Paul Scott
- Language: English
- Publisher: University of Chicago Press
- Publication date: 1977
- Pages: 258 pp (paperback)
- ISBN: 9780226743493
- Preceded by: A Division of the Spoils (1974)

Staying On is a novel by English writer Paul Scott which was published by University of Chicago Press in 1977. It was the recipient of the 1977 Booker Prize.

== Background ==
Paul Scott concluded and published the novel in 1977, and it won the 1977 Booker Prize. By then he was suffering from cancer, was unable to attend the prize ceremony, and died in 1978.

According to the British Newspaper The Guardian, "Scott probably didn't know he was dying when he wrote "Staying On", and it does little good to speculate on whether intimations of mortality influenced him."

== Plot summary ==
Staying On focuses on Tusker and Lucy Smalley, who were briefly mentioned in the latter two books of the Raj Quartet, The Towers of Silence and A Division of the Spoils. They were the last British couple who lived in the small hill town of Pankot (after the Indian independence).

Tusker was a colonel, a high rank in the British Indian Army. On his retirement, he had entered "the world of commerce" as a 'box wallah', and the couple had moved elsewhere in India. However, they had returned to Pankot to take up residence in the Lodge, an annexe to Smith's Hotel. This, formerly the town's principal hotel, was now symbolically overshadowed by the brash new Shiraz Hotel, erected by a consortium of Indian businessmen from the nearby city of Ranpur.

Their expat life in Pankot is principally explained in Lucy's thoughts, as she is the loquacious one, in contrast to Tusker's pathological reticence. He talks in clipped verbless telegraphese, often limiting his utterances to a single "Ha!". He has been purposeless since being obliged to retire, and it is left to Lucy to make sense of the world herself. She recounts a sad story of frustration. She remembers how the young Captain Smalley came back to London on leave in 1930, visited his bank, where she, a vicar's daughter, worked, and tentatively asked her out. She was swept off her feet by the thought of marrying an army officer, but life turned out very differently. His job was dull administration, and his early attentiveness in bed rapidly waned. He prohibited her from fulfilling herself by taking part in amateur dramatics. She ranked fairly low in the social pecking order among the wives of officers in Pankot and suffered numerous indignities. A symbol of this retrospection is that their preferred conveyance is the tonga, a horse-drawn carriage in which they choose to sit facing backward, "looking back at what we're leaving behind".

It falls to Lucy to navigate a path between her husband's obstinacy and obtuseness and the increasingly pressing demands of India's slow transition to modernity. The question of who pays the gardener, for example, requires the skilful management of human relationships. She also tries to maintain some continuity in her life, through correspondence with her old acquaintances (characters in the Raj Quartet), such as Sarah Layton (now Sarah Perron), who have moved back to England. It is through a letter from Sarah Perron that romantic fans of the Raj Quartet learn that she did indeed meet Guy again, and they are living happily ever after with their two children, Lance and Jane.

It is clear she blames Tusker for insisting on 'staying on'—at one point they could have retired comfortably to England, but he has been reckless ("nothing goes quicker than hundred rupee notes"), and now she has no idea if they could afford it. She entreats him to tell her how she would stand financially if he were to die. At long last, he writes her a letter, setting out their finances and also remarking that she had been "a good woman" to him. But he also tells her not to ask him about it, as he is incapable of discussing it face to face: "If you do I'll only say something that will hurt you". Nevertheless, she treasures this, the only love letter she has ever received.

Meanwhile, we see the new India that is replacing the British Raj, symbolised by Mrs Lila Bhoolabhoy, the temperamental and overweight owner of Smith's Hotel, and her much put upon husband and hotel manager, who is Tusker's drinking companion. The richly humorous context includes the engagement of servants, the railway service, poached eggs, hairdressing and the church organ. There is an intimate relationship between the Smalleys' servant Ibrahim and Mrs Bhoolabhoy's maid Minnie.

Mrs Bhoolabhoy's greed induces her to trade her ownership of the now shabby Smith's hotel for a share in the competing consortium. She instructs Mr Bhoolabhoy to issue the Smalleys with a notice to quit the Lodge.

On receipt of this letter, Tusker shouts out in anger and drops dead of a heart attack. Lucy is downcast and puts on a brave face as she prepares for the funeral and a solitary life. But, at last, she would potentially be free to return to England, perhaps able to scrape by on her £1,500 a year. She is a survivor, because she can adapt, as is shown by the fact that, on the day of Tusker's death, she was about to break a previously upheld taboo and welcome her hairdresser, Susy, who is of mixed race, to dinner. In her imagination, she asks Tusker one last thing: To take her with him; for if she had been a good woman, as he wrote, why has he gone home without her?

== Reception ==
Staying On was received with positive reviews, having won the Booker Prize in 1977. It serves as a conclusion to Scott's Raj Quartet series, offering a unique and engrossing portrait of the end of an empire and a forty-year marriage.

The novel is set in the small hill town of Pankot, India, and follows Tusker and Lucy Smalley, a British couple who chose to remain in India after independence. Their story is one of adjustment to a new life post-Empire, and has been praised as "a confront to the realities of a changing society and their own relationship." Critics have praised the book for its deep character study and its exploration of themes such as loyalty, love, and the legacy of colonialism.

== Adaptations ==
In 1980, the book was turned into a television film of same title produced by Granada TV and starring Trevor Howard and Celia Johnson. The book influenced the television series The Jewel in the Crown (TV series) which was based on Paul Scott's Raj Quartet novels.
