= Thirteen Against Fate =

British mystery thriller series

- Written by: Based on 13 non-Jules Maigret stories by Georges Simenon.
- Country of origin: United Kingdom
- Original language: English
- No. of series: 1
- No. of episodes: 13

Production
- Producer: Irene Shubik

Original release
- Network: BBC1
- Release: 19 June – 11 September 1966

Thirteen Against Fate is a British mystery thriller series, comprising thirteen individual stories by the Belgian writer, Georges Simenon. There are no links between each story, other than the original author, and no story features Simenon's most famous creation, Jules Maigret. The series' producer Irene Shubik described the series at the time as “these plays are not for the squeamish. They are not light detective stories, but intense psychological studies of individuals deeply involved in the aftermath of murder or death.” Intended to be more of a psychological series than the usual British detective serial of the time, The Daily Telegraph described the first episode as "[a]n intelligent television crime series that concentrates on the character of the criminal instead of the almost invariably successful process of detection is overdue."

Thirteen episodes were produced by the BBC and broadcast on Sunday evenings between 19 June to 11 September 1966.

== Archive status ==
Long thought almost entirely lost, only three episodes were known to survive. In 2010, a further ten episodes were recovered by the British Film Institute from the American Library of Congress as part of a extensive archive haul of over 60 dramas produced by the BBC and ITV made between 1957 to 1969. These titles form part of a collection that was donated to the LOC by US National Educational Television, the forerunner of PBS, through its channel WNET/ Thirteen New York. The entire series now exists complete in the archives.

== Episode list ==
No. in series	Title	Directed by	Written by	Original release date
1	"The Lodger"	Hugh Leonard	James Ferman	19 June 1966
Principal Cast: Zia Mohyeddin, Gwendolyn Watts, Gemma Jones, Nicolas Chagrin, Clive Cazes, Neil Wilson Based on the Simenon story "Le Locataire" (1934)
2	"Trapped"	George Spenton-Foster	Julia Jones	26 June 1966
Principal Cast: Ronald Lewis, Keith Buckley, Sylvia Coleridge, Tenniel Evans, John Barrard, Donald Eccles, Geoffrey Cheshire, Derek Martin Based on "Cours d’Assises" (1941)
3	"The Traveller"	Herbert Wise	Stanley Miller	3 July 1966
Principal Cast: Kenneth J. Warren, Hywel Bennett, André van Gyseghem, Alan Lake, Kevin Stoney, Joan Young, Edward Burnham, Michael Hawkins, Jocelyn Birdsall Based on "Le Voyageur de la Toussaint" (1941)
4	"The Widower"	Silvio Narizzano	Clive Exton	10 July 1966
Principal Cast: Joss Ackland, Henry Gilbert, Patricia Healey, Aimée Delamain Based on "Le Veuf" (1959)
5	"The Judge"	Naomi Capon	Hugh Leonard	17 July 1966
Principal Cast: Alexander Knox, John Ronane, Peter Howell, Erik Chitty, Keith Pyott, Wolfe Morris, Rosamund Greenwood Based on "Les Témoins" (1955)
6	"The Schoolmaster"	Peter Potter	Alun Richards	24 July 1966
Principal Cast: Stephen Murray, Helen Cherry, Cyril Shaps, Denis Carey, John Caesar, Petra Markham, Russell Waters, Robin Scott Based on "L’Evadé" (1936)
7	"The Witness"	John Gorrie	John Hale	31 July 1966
Principal Cast: Pamela Brown, Daphne Heard, Moultrie Kelsall, Barry Jackson, Sheila Grant, Christopher Burgess, Basil Moss, Will Stampe, Trevor Baxter, Reginald Barratt Based on "Le Haut Mal" (1933)
8	"The Friends"	Michael Hayes	Anthony Steven	7 August 1966
Principal Cast: Jessica Dunning, Frederick Jaeger, Sandor Elès, Joby Blanshard, Michael Robbins, Edward Dentith Based on "Chemin sans issue" (1938)
9	"The Survivors"	Rudolph Cartier	Stanley Miller	14 August 1966
Principal Cast: Lila Kedrova, David Buck, Kathleen Breck, Frank Williams, Terence De Marney, Hamilton Dyce, Jerold Wells, Michael Brennan Based on "Les Rescapés du Télémaque" (1938)
10	"The Son"	Waris Hussein	Jeremy Paul	21 August 1966
Principal Cast: Joan Miller, Simon Ward, Jack Woolgar, Clive Dunn, Lila Kaye, Alan Curtis, John Tillinger, Kevin Manser Based on "Les Destins des Malous" (1947)
11	"The Murderer"	Alan Bridges	Clive Exton	28 August 1966
Principal Cast: Frank Finlay, Michael Goodliffe, Annette Crosbie, Lyndon Brook, Jeremy Spenser, Norman Mitchell, Stephanie Bidmead, John Gill Based on "L’Assassin" (1937)
12	"The Suspect"	Michael Hayes	Donal Giltinan	4 September 1966
Principal Cast: Marius Goring, Mary Miller, Peter Halliday, David Garfield, Noel Johnson, Jon Rollason, John Forgeham Based on "Les Fiançailles de M. Hire" (1933)
13	"The Consul"	John Gorrie	Leo Lehman	11 September 1966
Principal Cast: Jonathan Burn, Michele Dotrice, Jeanette Sterke, Michael Pennington, John Ringham, Andreas Malandrinos, Geoffrey Beevers, John Brandon, John Savident, Michael Lynch. Based on “Les Gens d’en Face” (1933)
