= Irene Shubik =

British television producer and story editor (1929–2019)

- Born: 26 December 1929; Hampstead, London, UK
- Died: 26 September 2019 (aged 89); Northwood, London, UK
- Education: University College London
- Occupations: Television producer and story editor

Irene Shubik (26 December 1929 – 26 September 2019) was a British television producer and story editor, known for her contribution to the development of the single play in British television drama. Beginning her career in television at ABC Weekend TV, she worked on Armchair Theatre as a story editor, where she devised the science fiction anthology series Out of this World.

Moving to the BBC, she briefly worked as a story editor before being promoted to producer, creating the science fiction anthology television series Out of the Unknown. Leaving Out of the Unknown after two seasons, Shubik co-produced The Wednesday Play, overseeing its transition into Play for Today in 1970. She left the BBC in 1976, and subsequently produced the first season of Rumpole of the Bailey for Thames Television before joining Granada Television where she produced Staying On and devised The Jewel in the Crown. She also wrote film scripts and a novel, The War Guest.

== Early life and career ==
Irene Shubik was born in 1929 in Hampstead, London to a Russian-born Jewish father Joseph Shubik, who worked for a Scottish textile company and a French Jewish mother, Sara (née Soloveychik). When World War II broke out in 1939, she was evacuated to Canada with her mother and Martin, her brother. She read English literature at University College London, obtaining an MA in “The Use of English History in Drama from 1599-1642”. Uninterested in a career in academia, she applied to join the BBC but was turned down. Unable to obtain work, she moved to the United States, visiting her brother, the economist Martin Shubik, who was teaching at Princeton University. Meeting with little success in building a career in Princeton, when her brother was called before the Dean of the University for keeping a woman in his quarters, she moved to Wilmette, Chicago where her other brother, cancer researcher Philippe Shubik, was based. She joined the film department of the Encyclopædia Britannica, who were impressed by her MA thesis, where Shubik worked as a scriptwriter. Shubik was subsequently offered a twelve-month contract with the National Film Board of Canada but was unable to take up the position as both of her parents had become seriously ill.

== Television career ==
=== With ABC Weekend TV ===
By 1960, now back in England, Shubik's career was back at square one. She contributed occasional scripts to documentary series such as Associated-Rediffusion's This Week before securing employment at ABC Weekend TV. At ABC, she worked as a story editor for producer Sydney Newman on the anthology series Armchair Theatre, overseeing such plays as Where I Live by Clive Exton, A Night Out by Harold Pinter and After The Funeral by Alun Owen. An enthusiast of science fiction, while working on Armchair Theatre she oversaw Murder Club, an adaptation of Robert Sheckley’s novel Seventh Victim. Its success enabled her to persuade Newman to develop a science fiction version of Armchair Theatre – this became Out of This World, a thirteen part anthology series, hosted by Boris Karloff, that aired between 30 June 1962 and 22 September 1962. Many of the stories featured in Out of this World were adaptations of stories by science fiction authors including Isaac Asimov, Philip K. Dick and Clifford D. Simak.

=== At the BBC ===
When Sydney Newman was poached by the BBC to head up their drama department in late 1962, he invited Shubik to join him. Accepting the offer, on the condition that she be promoted to producer within a year, Shubik joined the BBC in 1963 and became the story editor for Story Parade, an anthology series of adaptations of modern novels that was intended to be the main drama strand for the new channel BBC2 due to be launched in 1964. One of the best-received installments of Story Parade that Shubik worked was an adaptation of Isaac Asimov's 1954 novel The Caves of Steel starring Peter Cushing. Just as the success of “Murder Club” had enabled Shubik to persuade Newman to commission Out of this World, so The Caves of Steel’s positive reception opened the door for Shubik to devise a similar anthology series for BBC2 called Out of the Unknown, on which Shubik acted as story editor and producer. Like Out of this World, under Shubik's stewardship Out of the Unknown concentrated mainly on adaptations of science fiction stories including works by Frederik Pohl, Ray Bradbury, J. G. Ballard and Isaac Asimov (of whom Shubik was a particular fan, commissioning adaptations of six of his works for Out of the Unknown, once commenting that he was "one of the most interesting and amusing men I have ever met"). Among the most notable productions were adaptations of Kate Wilhelm’s Andover and the Android, John Brunner’s Some Lapse of Time, E.M. Forster’s The Machine Stops and Mordecai Roshwald’s Level 7. The adaptation of The Machine Stops won the first prize at the Fifth Festival Internazionale del Film di Fantascienza (International Science Fiction Film Festival) in Trieste on 17 July 1967.

In parallel with producing the second season of Out of the Unknown, Shubik produced Thirteen Against Fate, a series of adaptations of short crime stories by Maigret creator Georges Simenon broadcast between 19 June 1966 and 11 September 1966.

In 1967, as she began work assembling scripts for the third season of Out of the Unknown, Shubik accepted the chance to take over as co-producer (with Graeme MacDonald) of The Wednesday Play, BBC1’s premier drama slot, producing such plays as Tony Parker's “Mrs Lawrence Will Look After It”, William Trevor's “A Night With Mrs Ta Danka” and Peter Terson's “The Last Train Through the Harecastle Tunnel”. In 1970, she oversaw the transition of The Wednesday Play into Play for Today. The most well received play she oversaw for Play for Today was Jeremy Sandford's "Edna, the Inebriate Woman", which was later ranked 57th in the British Film Institute's list of the 100 Greatest British Television Programmes published in 2000. However, Edna's writer Jeremy Sandford later wrote that Shubik seemed to "sabotage" the effectiveness of the play influencing policy makers in her 1975 book on television drama by questioning the veracity of its content.

Moving on from Play for Today she oversaw an adaptation of Thomas Hardy’s Wessex Tales in 1973 before taking on the role of producer on another anthology series called The Mind Beyond, a spin-off from the Playhouse series of single plays.

=== Return to Independent Television ===
One of the plays Shubik produced for Play for Today was John Mortimer’s “Rumpole of the Bailey” (broadcast 17 December 1975), starring Leo McKern as the eponymous barrister. He was cast at Shubik's insistence, while Mortimer had expressed a strong preference for Michael Hordern. McKern greatly enjoyed playing the role and had indicated it was a part to which he would be interested in returning. Shubik commissioned six new Rumpole scripts from John Mortimer with a view to making a series but a change of senior personnel in the BBC led to the project being put on hold. In late 1976, at the invitation of Verity Lambert, Shubik departed the BBC for Thames Television and brought the Rumpole scripts with her. Shubik produced the first season of Rumpole of the Bailey in 1978 and commissioned the scripts for the second. "I wouldn’t say the BBC threw away a pearl richer than all its tribe, but it has mislaid a tasty box of kippers", wrote Nancy Banks-Smith in The Guardian. She left Thames for Granada Television, her professional relationship with Lambert having seriously deteriorated, where she was hired to produce an adaptation of Paul Scott’s Raj Quartet.

When Granada got cold feet about the scale of the project and the cost of filming in India, Shubik suggested that she produce an adaptation of Scott's Staying On as a pilot. Staying On was made in 1980 and put stars Trevor Howard and Celia Johnson together on screen again for the first time since Brief Encounter. Its success led Granada to give the go ahead to the Raj Quartet, which was filmed as The Jewel in the Crown and became one of Granada's most celebrated productions, placed twenty-second in the British Film Institute's 100 Greatest British Television Programmes. Shubik did not produce The Jewel in the Crown, having moved on to write the screenplay for the film Girl on a Swing for Columbia Pictures, but, having worked extensively on the fourteen scripts, was given a “devised by” credit at the start of each episode.

== Other work ==
Shubik was the author of Play for Today: The evolution of television drama, an autobiographical account of the development of the single play in British television which has become a standard reference work on the subject. The first edition appeared in 1975 and a revised second edition, incorporating new material on Rumpole of the Bailey, Staying On and The Jewel in the Crown, appeared in 2001. She also wrote the novel The War Guest (W.H. Allen, 1986).

In 1992, Shubik was chairman of the judges for the Best Drama Serial category for that year's British Academy Television Awards (BAFTAs). The award was presented to Prime Suspect, but following the ceremony four of the other seven members of the jury signed a public statement declaring that they had voted for G.B.H. to win. Shubik, who as chairman did not cast a vote, refused to publicly comment on the affair, but BAFTA Chairman Richard Price stated that the ballot papers passed on to him by Shubik had shown four votes for Prime Suspect and three for G.B.H.. Price claimed that the ballot papers could not be recounted as they had subsequently been destroyed. No blame was ever attached to Shubik by the four judges, and it was to her that they had initially turned to raise the apparent discrepancy with BAFTA. Jeremy Sandford pointed to Shubik's feud with Verity Lambert (who was the executive producer of G.B.H.) as an explanation for the incident.

== Production credits ==
Year	Title	Writer	Producer	
1962	Out of This World	No	No	13 episodes as story editor
1962–1963	Armchair Theatre	No	No	3 episodes as story editor
1964	Story Parade	No	No	2 episodes as script editor
1965	Theatre 625	No	No	1 episode as script editor
1966	Thirteen Against Fate	No	Yes	13 episodes
1966	The Lodger	No	Yes	Television film
1966	Trapped	No	Yes	Television film
1966	The Traveller	No	Yes	Television film
1966	The Schoolmaster	No	Yes	Television film
1966	The Witness	No	Yes	Television film
1966	The Friends	No	Yes	Television film
1966	The Survivors	No	Yes	Television film
1966	The Son	No	Yes	Television film
1966	The Counsel	No	Yes	Television film
1965–1967	Out of the Unknown	No	Yes	22 episodes 11 episode as script editor
1969	The Vortex	No	Yes	Television film
1967–1970	The Wednesday Play	No	Yes	21 episodes
1970–1975	Play for Today	No	Yes	26 episodes
1973	Wessex Tales	No	Yes	Television miniseries
1973–1976	BBC2 Playhouse	No	Yes	9 episodes
1976	Chronicle	Yes	No	"The Scrolls from the Son of a Star"; 1 episode as director
1978	Rumpole of the Bailey	No	Yes	6 episodes
1980	Staying On	No	Yes	Television film
1984	The Jewel in the Crown	Yes	Yes	Television miniseries
