= Martin Shubik =

American economist (1926–2018)

- Born: March 24, 1926; New York City, US
- Died: August 22, 2018 (aged 92); Branford, Connecticut, US
- Years active: 1953-2018
- Spouse: Julia Kahn
- Children: Claire Louise Shubik

Academic background
- Education: Princeton University; University of Toronto
- Doctoral advisor: Oskar Morgenstern

Academic work
- Discipline: Game theory; defense analysis; monetary economics
- Institutions: Yale University
- Doctoral students: James W. Friedman
- Notable ideas: Dollar auction
- Awards: Frederick W. Lanchester Prize; Koopman Prize
- Website: economics.yale.edu/people/martin-shubik; Information at IDEAS / RePEc

Martin Shubik (1926–2018) was an American mathematical economist who specialized in game theory, defense analysis, and the theory of money. The latter was his main research interest and he referred to it as his "white whale". He also coined the term "mathematical institutional economics" in 1959 to describe his scholarly approach to studying the economy. He spent the majority of his career at Yale University, where he was heavily involved with the Cowles Foundation for Research in Economics, and launched the virtual Museum of Money and Financial Institutions.

Outside of economics, he began studying inclusion body myositis (IBM) after a 2003 diagnosis. He provided seed money to the Yale School of Public Health for the IBM Disease Registry in 2011, a survey was conducted in 2012–2013, and he is a co-author on a 2015 paper about the initial results (along with his son-in-law Seth Richards-Shubik).

== Personal life ==
Martin Shubik was born on 24 March 1926 in New York City, New York to Joseph and Sara Shubik (née Soloveychik) (both of whom were Jewish, but Russian and French, respectively). However, Joseph Shubik worked for a Scottish flax and linen company and the family returned to London when Martin Shubik was just three months old. He remained in England until World War II, when he, Sara Shubik, and younger sister Irene Shubik (1929–2019) were sent to join relatives in Canada, while Joseph Shubik and older brother Philippe Shubik (1921–2004) stayed behind. To fulfill a condition of enrollment in college in Canada during the War, Martin Shubik enlisted in the Royal Canadian Navy and held the rank of Lieutenant before retiring in 1950.

Shubik was married to Julie Kahn (d. 2018) and had one child, Claire Louise Shubik (b. 1973). Irene Shubik became a British television producer and Philippe Shubik a cancer researcher.

== Education ==
Shubik earned a BA in mathematics (1947) and MA in Political Economy (1949) from the University of Toronto and an AM (1951) and PhD (1953) in Economics from Princeton University, where his dissertation was supervised by Oskar Morgenstern. His other teachers included Albert Tucker, John von Neumann, and Jacob Viner; his roommates were future Nobel Prize winners Lloyd Shapley and John Nash; and his classmates included Thomas Whitin, Otto Eckstein, Gary Becker, Marvin Minsky, John McCarthy, Herbert Scarf, Ralph Gomory, Richard Karlin, Alan Hoffman, and Harlan Mills.

Shubik and Shapley used the Shapley value to formulate the Shapley-Shubik power index in 1954 to measure the power of players in a voting game.

Shubik's curriculum vitae lists over 20 books and 300 articles, with Shapley being his most frequent collaborator (14 articles). Nash also appears twice, including with Shapley and Mel Hausner on "So Long Sucker - A Four Person Game" about a board game that they invented.

== Teaching and other employment ==
Before fully committing to academia, Shubik spent time at General Electric Company (GE) as a Consultant in Management Consultation Services from 1956 to 1960 and International Business Machines Corporation (IBM) as a Staff Member in the T. J. Watson Research Laboratories from 1961 to 1963. During his life, he served as a consultant and expert witness for many other companies, organizations, and government agencies (including the RAND Corporation). Later in life, he was an External Professor at the Santa Fe Institute from 1995 to 2018.

Shubik spent the majority of his career at Yale University, where he was Professor of the Economics of Organization from 1963 to 1975, then the Seymour H. Knox Professor of Mathematical Institutional Economics from 1975 until his retirement in 2007 (after which he became emeritus). He was also Director of the Cowles Foundation for Research in Economics from 1973 to 1976 and a founding faculty member of the Yale School of Management (originally the School of Organization and Management). He taught courses in economics, game theory, and investment theory and practice.

== Awards and honors ==
Shubik's awards included the Frederick W. Lanchester Prize (1984) for Game Theory in the Social Sciences, volume 1, the Koopman Prize (1995) with Jerome Bracken from the Institute for Operations Research and the Management Sciences (INFORMS), Fellow of Econometric Society (1971), Medal of College de France (1978), Fellow of American Academy of Arts and Sciences (1985), Honorary Professor of University of Vienna (1978), and he was a Distinguished Fellow of the American Economic Association (AEA; 2010).

== Other selected publications ==
=== Articles ===
- Mayberry, John; Nash, John; Shubik, Martin (1953). "A Comparison of Treatments of a Duopoly Situation". Econometrica. 21 (1): 141–154. doi:10.2307/1906952. JSTOR 1906952. S2CID 154750660.
- Shapley, Lloyd; Shubik, Martin (1971). "The Assignment Game I: The Core". International Journal of Game Theory. 1 (1): 111–130. doi:10.1007/BF01753437. S2CID 153971683.
- Shubik, Martin (1971). "The Dollar Auction Game: A Paradox in Noncooperative Behavior and Escalation". The Journal of Conflict Resolution. 15 (1): 109–111. doi:10.1177/002200277101500111. S2CID 155038630.
- Shubik, Martin (1973). "Commodity Money, Oligopoly, Credit, and Bankruptcy in a General Equilibrium Model". Economic Inquiry. 11 (1): 24–38. doi:10.1111/j.1465-7295.1973.tb00959.x.
- Shubik, Martin; Wilson, Charles (1977). "The Optimal Bankruptcy Rule in a Trading Economy using Fiat Money". Journal of Economics. 37 (3/4): 337–354. JSTOR 41797909.
- Shapley, Lloyd; Shubik, Martin (1977). "Trade using One Commodity as a Means of Payment". The Journal of Political Economy. 85 (5): 937–968. doi:10.1086/260616. JSTOR 1830340. S2CID 44086939.
- Shubik, Martin (1997). "Terrorism, Technology, and the Socioeconomics of Death". Comparative Strategy. 16 (4): 339–414. doi:10.1080/01495939708403125.

=== Books ===
- Shubik, Martin (1959). "Edgeworth Market Games". In Tucker, William; Luce, Robert (eds.). Contributions to the Theory of Games, Volume 4. Princeton: Princeton University Press. pp. 267–278. doi:10.1515/9781400882168-016. ISBN 9781400882168.
- Shubik, Martin (1999). Political Economy, Oligopoly and Experimental Games: The Selected Essays of Martin Shubik Volume 1. Cheltenham; Northampton: Edward Elgar Publishing Limited. ISBN 9781858982410.
- Shubik, Martin (1999). Money and Financial Institutions – A Game Theoretic Approach: The Selected Essays of Martin Shubik Volume Two. Cheltenham; Northampton: Edward Elgar Publishing Limited. ISBN 9781840641905.
- Shubik, Martin (1999). The Theory of Money and Financial Institutions, volume 1. Cambridge: MIT Press. ISBN 9780262194273.
- Shubik, Martin (2004). The Theory of Money and Financial Institutions, volume 2. Cambridge: MIT Press. ISBN 9780262194280.
- Shubik, Martin (2011). The Theory of Money and Financial Institutions, volume 3. Cambridge: MIT Press. ISBN 9780262013208.
- Shubik, Martin; Quint, Thomas (2014). Barley, Gold or Fiat: Toward a Pure Theory of Money. New Haven: Yale University Press. ISBN 9780300188158.
- Shubik, Martin; Smith, D. Eric (2016). The Guidance of an Enterprise Economy. Cambridge: MIT Press. ISBN 9780262034630.
