= Associated London Scripts =

Associated London Scripts (ALS) was a writers' agency organised as a co-operative which involved many leading comedy and television writers of the 1950s and 1960s.

In the early 1950s, as The Goon Show was gaining popularity, its main writer Spike Milligan accepted an invitation from Eric Sykes to share his small office above a grocer's shop at 130 Uxbridge Road, Shepherd's Bush. Sykes was then writing for the radio comedy series Educating Archie starring Peter Brough and his ventriloquist dummy Archie Andrews (in which Harry Secombe was also appearing).

Sykes originated the idea of forming a non-profit, co-operative writers' agency; Milligan then approached rising comedy writing partners Ray Galton and Alan Simpson with the proposal. Taking vacant space above Sykes's office, they jointly formed Associated London Scripts with Frankie Howerd and Sykes and Howerd's then manager Stanley "Scruffy" Dale. Their original secretary (a former schoolfriend of Simpson) was Beryl Vertue, who later became the firm's business affairs manager and in-house agent. Comedian Tony Hancock briefly joined the collective and other members included Terry Nation, Johnny Speight, Dennis Spooner and John Antrobus.

The venture eventually grew to include around thirty writers, with a support staff of twelve; by 1957 it had outgrown the Shepherd's Bush offices and moved to larger premises in Kensington High Street. Around 1960, ALS sold the Kensington offices and purchased even more prestigious premises at 9 Orme Court in Bayswater Road, adjacent to Hyde Park.

In 1967 Robert Stigwood bought a controlling interest in ALS; Galton and Simpson had favoured the deal (because Stigwood was moving into film production) but Sykes and Milligan did not, so they sold their controlling shares in the company to Stigwood, while Galton and Simpson (to their later regret) sold their share of Orme Court to Milligan and Sykes. Milligan later sold his half to Sykes. Wanting to move into production, Beryl Vertue opted to go with Stigwood becoming deputy chairman of his group; she subsequently became a leading independent producer.
