= Philippe Shubik =

Philippe Shubik (April 28, 1921 – December 20, 2004) was a British born American cancer researcher who founded the organization the Toxicology Forum, which facilitates international discussions on toxicology-related topics. He was also Director of the Eppley Institute for Research in Cancer and Allied Diseases.

== Biography ==
He was educated at Oxford University and at a young age served as a medical doctor in World War II, first as a medical officer in the service of the king, then as the director of a military hospital in India.

Upon moving to the United States in 1949, Shubik continued in his lifelong dedication to research, started after the war in England. He worked at Northwestern University in Chicago and later at the Chicago Medical School Institute of Medical Research, then as Director of the Eppley Institute for Research in Cancer and Allied Diseases.

The purpose of the Institute, dedicated in 1963, was to provide a research center that could perform and encourage fundamental studies leading to:

A better understanding of the causes of cancer;

The improvement of methods for diagnosis of cancer;

The improvement of methods for the treatment and prevention of cancer and similar disorders.

In 1968, Dr. Philippe Shubik became Eppley Institute Director, and his research group moved to UNMC [University of Nebraska Medical Center] from the Chicago Medical School. This group's research focused on the study of chemical carcinogenesis, using both experimental pathological and biochemical methods. Subsequently, the program combined research into mechanisms of carcinogenesis with research to define carcinogens important in human disease.

At that time the Eppley Foundation, in collaboration with the National Cancer Institute and UNMC, funded the construction of the Eppley Hall of Science, which added 30,000 square feet (2,800 m^{2}) of research space to the Institute. This addition opened in 1973.

In 1972, by action of the Nebraska Legislature, the Eppley Institute became an independent research institute with the director reporting to the Chancellor of UNMC, rather than to the Dean of the College of Medicine.

Shubik was the oldest of three children. His siblings were Martin Shubik, the economist, and Irene Shubik, a British television producer.
