= The Mind Beyond =

- Country of origin: United Kingdom
- No. of series: 1
- No. of episodes: 6

Production
- Producer: Irene Shubik
- Running time: 50 minutes

Original release
- Network: BBC
- Release: 29 September – 3 November 1976

The Mind Beyond is a BBC2 supernatural anthology television series – part of BBC 2's Playhouse series – which ran from September to November 1976. It was produced by Irene Shubik and consists of 6 episodes. A book of the same name was also published to accompany the series.

== Episode list ==
Episode no.	Title	First transmission (UK)	Director	Writer	Cast
1	"Meriel the Ghost Girl"	29 September 1976	Philip Saville	David Halliwell	Donald Pleasence (George Livingston); John Bluthal (Sam Nicholls); Janet Street-Porter (Robina Oliver); Charles Keating (Dr. Delane); Diana King (Mrs. Livingston); Sarah Douglas (Miss. Radson); Tim Barlow (Mr. Smith)
2	"Double Echo"	6 October 1976	Alan Bridges	Brian Hayles	Jeremy Kemp (Dr. Mallam); Anthony Bate (Dr. Raeburn; Gerry Cowper (Alison Fisher); Clifford Rose (Mr. Fisher); Diana Fairfax (Mrs. Fisher)
3	"The Love of a Good Woman"	13 October 1976	John Gorrie	William Trevor	Anna Massey (Isabella Ridout); William Lucas (Henry Ridout); Diana Bishop (Emily Troop); John Baker (Mr. Baste); Paul Cooper (Fisherman)
4	"The Daedalus Equations"	20 October 1976	David Reid	Bruce Stewart	Michael Bryant Sam McInstrey); George Coulouris (Hans Daedalus); Peter Sallis (Major Venables); Megs Jenkins (Eileen Gray); Richard Hurndall (Sherborne); Rod Beacham (Sergeant Riley)
5	"Stones"	27 October 1976	Graham Evans	Christopher Bigsby & Malcolm Bradbury	Richard Pasco (Nicholas Reeve); Judy Parfitt (Anne Reeve); T. P. McKenna (Harvey Fenton-Jones); John Wells (Porton); Willoughby Goddard (Snaithe); Michael Sheard (Police Inspector)
6	"The Man with the Power"	3 November 1976	John Gorrie	Evan Jones	Willie Jonah (Boysie); Cyril Cusack (Adler); Vikki Richards (Gloria); Geoffrey Bayldon (Mr. Smythe); Johnny Briggs (Brian); Rayner Bourton (The Devil); Peter Spraggon (Publican)
