= The Raj Quartet =

Four-volume novel series by Paul Scott

- The Jewel in the Crown; The Day of the Scorpion; The Towers of Silence; A Division of the Spoils
- Author: Paul Scott
- Country: United Kingdom
- Language: English
- Publisher: Penguin Books
- Media type: Print (Hardcover and Paperback)

The Raj Quartet is a four-volume novel sequence, written by Paul Scott, about the concluding years of the British Raj in India. The series was written during the period 1965–75. The Times called it "one of the most important landmarks of post-war fiction."

== Plot ==
The story of The Raj Quartet begins in 1942. World War II is at its zenith, and in South East Asia, the Allied forces have suffered great losses. Burma has fallen, and the Japanese invasion of the Indian subcontinent from the east appears imminent. The year 1942 is also marked by Indian nationalist leader Mahatma Gandhi's call for the Quit India movement to the British rulers of India. The Raj Quartet is set in this tumultuous background for the British soldiers and civilians stationed in India who have a duty to manage this part of the British Empire, known as the "jewel in the crown" of the British monarch. One recurrent theme is the moral certainty of the older generation as contrasted with the anomie of the younger. Another theme is the treatment of Indians by Britons living in India. As a reflection of these themes, the British characters let themselves be "trapped by codes and principles, which were in part to keep their own fears and doubts at bay." Most of the major characters suffer difficulties, and some die, either because they try to follow codes which have become outmoded (Ahmed Kasim, Merrick, Teddie Bingham) or because they reject the codes and become outsiders (Kumar, Lady and Daphne Manners, Sarah Layton). Some critics have compared The Raj Quartet to the epic novels of Proust and Tolstoy. Though some critics have thought the Quartet to be a straightforward example of nineteenth-century style realism, others have argued that its non-linear narrative style and occasional "outburst of dreams, hallucinations and spiritual revelations" give it an added dimension.

The main characters of the first novel are Daphne Manners, a young Englishwoman who has recently arrived in India, and her British-educated Indian paramour, Hari Kumar. Ronald Merrick, a British police officer belonging to the Indian Police Service, is another main character. By the end of the series the narrative lead is taken by Guy Perron.

== Reception ==
Salman Rushdie wrote, "The Quartet's form, tells us, in effect, that the history of the end of the Raj was largely composed of the doings of the officer class and its wife. Indians get walk-ons, but remain, for the most part, bit-players in their own history." Conversely, Tariq Ali praised the books for providing a nuanced class analysis of the British in India and the Anglicized Indian upper classes who served the British during the Raj and later took control over India and Pakistan after the independence and the partition.

== The novels ==
The manner of narration is, especially in the first volume, looping and elliptical, shifting from 1942 to 1964 and back again, with detours back to the early 1900s. The voices shift as well as the perspective, from a third-person narrative about the doomed schoolteacher Edwina Crane to a first-person narration by another character, Lady Chatterjee, to a tour of Mayapore one evening in 1964. This shifting chronology, while never confusing, has inspired much discussion.

The four volumes are:

- The Jewel in the Crown (1966)
- The Day of the Scorpion (1968)
- The Towers of Silence (1971)
- A Division of the Spoils (1975)

Some of the characters are carried through to a further novel called

- Staying On (1977)

== Film, TV or theatrical adaptations ==
- 1984:The Jewel in the Crown is a television mini-series based upon parts of all four books. The selection of parts to be dramatised resulted in the series giving greater emphasis to the narrative as experienced and understood by the British characters as compared to the experiences of the Indian characters. The series was created by Granada Television for ITV and starred Susan Wooldridge, Art Malik, Om Puri, Geraldine James, Saeed Jaffrey, Karan Kapoor, Peggy Ashcroft, Judy Parfitt, Tim Pigott-Smith and Charles Dance.
- 2005: A 9-part BBC Radio 4 adaptation under the original title, using the book titles as subtitles.
