= The Day of the Scorpion =

1968 book by Paul Scott

- First edition
- Author: Paul Scott
- Language: English
- Genre: Historical novel
- Publisher: Heinemann
- Publication date: September 1968
- Publication place: United Kingdom
- Media type: Print (Hardback & Paperback)
- Pages: 496 p. (hardback edition)
- ISBN: 0-434-68109-1 (hardback edition)
- OCLC: 466171
- LC Class: PZ4.S428 Day PR6069.C596
- Preceded by: The Jewel in the Crown
- Followed by: The Towers of Silence

The Day of the Scorpion is a 1968 novel by Paul Scott, the second in his Raj Quartet. It is set in India during World War II as the influence of the British erodes. The novel focuses on old Raj family, the Laytons, the aftermath of the Mayapore incident focused on in The Jewel in the Crown, the Indian politician Mohammed Ali Kasim, and events in the princely state of Mirat.

== Plot introduction ==
The novel is set in British India of the 1940s. It follows on from the storyline in The Jewel in the Crown.

Much of the novel is written in the form of interviews and reports of conversations and research from the point of view of a narrator. Other portions are in the form of letters from one character to another or entries in their diaries.

=== Setting ===
The story is set in the period 1942-1944 in several locations in India, particularly in a northern province. The province shares characteristics with Punjab and the United Provinces. The names of places and people suggest a connection to Bengal; however, the physical characteristics place the setting in north-central India, rather than in northeast India. The province has an agricultural plain and, in the north, a mountainous region.

The capital of the province is Ranpur. Another large city in the province is Mayapore, which was the key setting in The Jewel in the Crown. The princely state of Mirat is a nominally sovereign enclave within the province. Pankot is a "second-class" hill station in the province that serves as a headquarters for the 1st Pankot Rifles, a regiment of the Indian Army, who fought the Axis in North Africa. During the cool season, the regiment moves to Ranpur, on the plains. At Premanagar there is an old fortification that is used by the British as a prison. Another town, Muzzafirabad, is the headquarters of the Muzzafirabad ("Muzzy") Guides, another Indian Army regiment. Sundernagar is a "backwater town" in the province. Another hill station is in the Nanoora Hills.

== Plot summary ==
This novel introduces the Layton family of Pankot as principal characters. Colonel Layton, who served in the North African campaign, is held prisoner of war by the Nazis. His wife, Mildred, and his daughters (Sarah and Susan) live in Pankot while Colonel Layton's stepmother, known as Auntie Mabel, occupies the family estate at Rose Cottage.

Now an army captain, Ronald Merrick, a self-made man of the lower middle class and the former police official in charge of the Daphne Manners case, begins to insinuate himself subtly into the Layton family. We learn what the Laytons do not know, that in a searing session with the incarcerated Hari Kumar, Merrick tortured and molested him.

Susan, the younger Layton sister, driven by a sense of her own nothingness, marries Teddie Bingham, a colourless and conventional officer in the prestigious Muzzy Guides regiment. By accident, Teddie and Merrick are roommates, and when his designated best man falls ill at the last minute, Teddie asks Merrick to act as best man. The wedding is held in Mirat, a native state ruled by a Nawab. On the way to the wedding ceremony, someone throws a stone at the car in which Teddie and Merrick are riding. Teddie is injured and has to be patched up. At the wedding reception, the Nawab of Mirat becomes a victim of heightened security when he is denied entrance to his own property as he is an Indian. When the newlyweds are being seen off at the railway station, Shalini Gupta Sen appears and makes a scene, begging Merrick to reveal the whereabouts of her nephew, Hari Kumar.

Nigel Rowan, an officer serving in the civil service, takes Lady Manners to observe the debriefing of Hari Kumar, who was tortured and jailed after the rape of Lady Manners's niece, Daphne, and who has been held in prison for a year under the Defence of India Act for alleged political crimes. The panel, which includes Rowan and V. R. Gopal, is horrified to learn of Hari's treatment at Merrick's hands. It comes out that Hari has never been informed that Daphne conceived a child and then died. The questioners realize that Hari's statements will be too inflammatory in the fragile political climate of India. They also realize that Hari is innocent, however, and suspect that at some point in the future, he will be quietly released from custody.

Teddie and Merrick are sent to the front in Manipur against the Japanese and their surrogates, the Indian National Army (known as "Jiffs" among the British). Teddie, against Merrick's warnings, falls victim to an INA ambush while trying to induce defectors from his regiment to surrender. Merrick does his best to save Teddie, but is unsuccessful, and comes away horribly disfigured. Teddie goes forward, it is implied, because he is concerned about the methods Merrick might employ on the turncoats.

Sarah Layton, the older sister, comes to the fore as the moral conscience of the family. To show the family's gratitude for his efforts, Sarah visits Merrick in Calcutta, where he is convalescing at an Army hospital. Merrick explains to her why he believes himself partly responsible for Teddie's fate. She is horrified by his disfigurement and learns that much of Merrick's left arm is to be amputated.

While in Calcutta, Sarah is staying with Aunt Fenny, her mother's younger sister, who is eager to get Sarah matched up with a young man. Fenny gets her husband, Lt. Col. Arthur Grace, to bring several of his junior officers over for dinner. In particular, she is enthusiastic about introducing Sarah to Jimmy Clark. After an unsuccessful evening on the town, Clark takes Sarah to the Indian side of Calcutta, where they attend a party at the home of a wealthy socialite. There, Clark seduces Sarah by challenging her to taste life.

On her way back to Pankot, Sarah encounters Count Bronowsky, a White Russian emigre who is the Nawab's wazir or chief advisor, whom she had met during Susan and Teddie's wedding. With him is Nigel Rowan. They are there to meet Mohammed Ali Kasim, a prominent politician who is being released after a period of imprisonment under the Defence of India Act. Kasim learns from his younger son, Ahmed, that his elder son, Sayed, an officer in the Indian Army, has become turncoat and joined the INA and now faces charges of treason.

Barbie Batchelor, friend and paying guest of Mabel Layton, discovers the secret of the enmity between Mabel and Mildred one night when both the elderly women are unable to sleep. Mabel also tells Barbie she will never go to Ranpur again until after she is buried, which Barbie interprets to mean that she wishes be buried next to the grave of her late husband, James Layton, in Ranpur.

Susan Bingham, Teddie's newlywed and pregnant bride, is unhinged when having received news of Teddie's death she witnesses her aunt Mabel's death. As it is, Susan depends on others to define her role and character. Without Teddie to serve as the anchor for her identity, Susan is lost and afraid to be responsible for a fatherless child. Coming unhinged, she makes a ring of fire with paraffin and places the baby within it, in imitation of a native treatment of scorpions that she witnessed as a child. The baby is rescued unharmed by its nurse.

== Critical reception ==
A 1968 book review in Kirkus Reviews, an anonymous reviewer called the novel a "rich, elaborately terraced novel." The review summarized that Scott's "view of the crippling illusionary quests of men and nations, his ability to recreate a culture and a time, continue to mark him as a novelist of importance."
