= The Jewel in the Crown (novel) =

1966 book by Paul Scott

- First edition (UK)
- Author: Paul Scott
- Language: English
- Genre: Historical novel
- Publisher: Heinemann
- Publication date: July 1966
- Publication place: United Kingdom
- Media type: Print (Hardback & Paperback)
- Pages: 464 p.
- ISBN: 0-434-68105-9
- OCLC: 13833684
- Followed by: The Day of the Scorpion

The Jewel in the Crown is a 1966 novel by Paul Scott that begins his Raj Quartet. The four-volume novel sequence of the Quartet is set during the final days of the British Raj in India during the Second World War. The novel is written in the form of interviews and reports of conversations or research and other portions are in the form of letters (epistolary form) or diary entries. The novel focuses on the triangle of an English woman, an Indian man, and a British police superintendent, setting up the events of subsequent novels in the series. It is considered Scott's "major work." The title itself, which is also an expression for something most valuable, refers to the fact that India was considered to be the most valuable possession of the British Empire. The plot has direct similarities to the novel A Passage to India by E.M. Forster published in 1924.

== Plot introduction ==
Much of the novel is written in the form of interviews and reports of conversations and research from the point of view of a narrator. Other portions are in the form of letters from one character to another or entries in their diaries. Still others take the form of reports from an omniscient observer.

=== Setting ===
The story is set in 1942 in Mayapore, a fictional city in an unnamed province of British India. The province, which is located in northern India, shares characteristics with Punjab and the United Provinces. The names of places and people suggest a connection to Bengal, for example Mayapore is similar to Mayapur in West Bengal; however, the physical characteristics place the setting in north-central India, rather than in northeast India. The province has an agricultural plain and, in the north, a mountainous region. Dibrapur is a smaller town about 75 miles away.

Mayapore, although not the capital of the province, is a relatively large city, with a significant British presence in the cantonment area, where native Indians are not permitted to live. Across the rail lines lies the “black town,” where the native population resides. There is also a Eurasian Quarter, the residence of the mixed-race (Anglo-Indian) population of the city.

== Plot summary ==
Daphne Manners, who has lost her immediate family in England, comes to India to live with her only remaining family member, Lady Manners. Lady Manners sends her to Mayapore to stay with her Indian friend, Lady Chatterjee.

While staying with Lady Chatterjee, whom she calls "Auntie Lili," Daphne meets Hari Kumar. He is an Indian who was brought up in England and educated at Chillingborough, a public school that Daphne's own brother attended. Hari speaks only English, but his father's financial collapse and suicide obliged Hari to return to India. Daphne learns to despise the attitudes of the English in India and also grows to love Hari.

Subsequent to Kumar's arrest and Daphne's association with him, the local police superintendent, Ronald Merrick, becomes infatuated with Daphne. Merrick, of lower-middle-class English origin, is resentful of the privileged English "public school" class and contemptuous of Indians. Hari thus represents everything that Merrick hates.

After Daphne and Hari make love in a public park, the Bibighar Gardens, they are attacked by a mob of rioters who by chance witnessed their lovemaking. Hari is beaten and Daphne is raped repeatedly. Knowing that Hari will be implicated in her rape, Daphne swears him to silence regarding his presence at the scene. But she does not count on the instincts of Ronald Merrick, who, upon learning of the rape, immediately takes Hari into custody and engages in a lengthy and sadistic interrogation that includes sexual humiliation. Merrick also arrests a group of educated young Indians, including some of Hari's colleagues at the Mayapore Gazette.

Daphne steadfastly refuses to support the prosecution of Hari and the others for rape. She insists that her attackers were peasants and included at least one Muslim (although she was blindfolded, she could tell he was circumcised) and could not be young, educated Hindus like Hari and his acquaintances who have been taken into custody. The inquest is frustrated when Daphne threatens to testify that, for all she knows, her attackers could have been Englishmen.

Hari puzzles the authorities by refusing to say anything, even in his own defence (he has been sworn to secrecy by Daphne, and he honours that pledge to the letter). Because the authorities cannot successfully prosecute him for rape, they instead imprison him under a wartime law as a suspected revolutionary. And Daphne's refusal to aid a prosecution for rape leads to her being reviled and ostracized by the British community of Mayapore and of British India as a whole, where her case has become a cause célèbre.

Unknown to Hari, Daphne is pregnant; the child's paternity is impossible to determine, but she considers the child to be Hari's. She returns to her aunt, Lady Manners, to give birth, but a pre-existing medical condition results in her death. Lady Manners takes the child, Parvati, to Kashmir. Parvati's physical resemblance to Hari satisfies Lady Manners and Lady Chatterjee that Hari was her biological father.

== Critical reception ==
A 1966 book review in Kirkus Reviews called the novel "a slow-moving one, filled with a tremendous number of ideas, views, speculations imposed in an attempt to convey the contradictions between not only England and India, but within India itself, a cosmos in which there are many circles within circles, mystical, social, political." The review summarized, "It is certainly Paul Scott's major work and it has already been established that he is a thoughtful and tasteful writer, even though he has never achieved the readership some of his books have deserved and many of the reviewers have indicated." In a 2017 article in The New York Times, Isaac Chotiner called Scott's achievement "was to tell this story largely from the British point of view, and to do so not merely without illusions, but with astonishing acuity and grace."
