= Paul Scott (novelist) =

English novelist, playwright and poet (1920–1978)

- Scott in 1977
- Born: Paul Mark Scott; 25 March 1920; London, England
- Died: 1 March 1978 (aged 57); London, England
- Education: Winchmore Hill Collegiate School
- Occupations: author, literary agent
- Spouse: Nancy Edith Avery
- Writing career
- Genres: Fiction, Poetry
- Notable awards: Booker Prize

Paul Mark Scott (25 March 1920 – 1 March 1978) was an English novelist best known for his tetralogy The Raj Quartet. In the last years of his life, his novel Staying On won the Booker Prize (1977). The series of books was dramatised by Granada Television during the 1980s and won Scott the public and critical acclaim that he had not received during his lifetime.

Born in suburban London, Scott was posted to India, Burma and Malaya during World War II. On return to London he worked as a notable literary agent, before deciding to write full time from 1960. In 1964 he returned to India for a research trip, though he was struggling with ill health and alcoholism. From the material gathered he created the novels that would become The Raj Quartet. In the final years of his life he accepted a visiting professorship at the University of Tulsa, where much of his private archive is held.

== Early life ==
Paul Scott was born at 130 Fox Lane in the district of Palmers Green/Southgate, in North London, the younger of two sons. His father, Thomas (1870–1958), was a Yorkshireman who moved to London in the 1920s with family members from Headingley. He was a commercial artist, specialising in drawing for calendars and cards. Scott's mother, Frances, née Mark (1886–1969) was the daughter of a labourer from south London. In later life Scott noted the tension in himself between the pull of his mother's creative ambition and his father's real world, grounded approach to life.

Scott was educated at the private Winchmore Hill Collegiate School, but had to leave early, without any qualifications, as his father's business met financial difficulties. This division from his studies was mirrored through the rest of his life—the battle between the demands of practical needs versus the urge to create. Scott worked as an accounts clerk for C. T. Payne and took evening classes in book-keeping and wrote poetry in his spare time. He later noted that the rigid social hierarchies and codes of his suburban childhood he found echoed in British Indian society.

== Military service ==
Scott was conscripted into the British Army as a private soldier early in 1940, with the British Intelligence Department. He trained as a private in Torquay with the 8th Battalion, the Buffs (Royal East Kent Regiment). During this time two of his aunts were killed in an air raid.

He had been initially appalled by what he found on the subcontinent—by the heat, dust, poverty, disease, and overcrowding, above all by the imperial attitudes of the British—but over the next three years he fell deeply in love with India.

— Biographer Hilary Spurling

In 1943, at the age of 22, Scott was posted as a commissioned officer in the British Indian Army, and he sailed on the Athlone Castle from Liverpool that year. He quickly came down with amoebic dysentery, not diagnosed until 1964. The disease may have had some effect on his character and writing. He joined the Indian Army Service Corps and became familiar with life at hill stations such as Abbottabad and Murree. He made many close friendships with Indian comrades, and literary portraits of his friends appear in his works from this point.

He later helped to organise the logistic support for the Fourteenth Army's reconquest of Burma. After the fall of Rangoon in 1945 he spent time in Calcutta and Kashmir, later posted to Malaya to end the Japanese occupation; they had, however, already surrendered by the time Scott arrived. In his time away from India he missed the country deeply and longed to return. At the end of the year he rejoined his company at Bihar and sailed back to England, having spent three years in India. During his service, he continued to write poetry.

== Career ==
In 1941, before his military posting, Scott had published a collection of three religious poems entitled I, Gerontius, as part of the Resurgam Series of pamphlets. He wrote for Country Life and The Times. His work was included in Poetry Quarterly and the poetry anthology Poems of this War (1942). In 1948 he published Pillars of Salt in a collection of Four Jewish Plays.

After demobilisation in 1946, Scott was employed in the two small publishing houses, Falcon Press and Grey Walls Press, headed by the Conservative MP Peter Baker.

In 1950 Scott joined Pearn, Pollinger & Higham as a literary agent (later to split into Pollinger Limited and David Higham Associates) and subsequently became a director. He was described as caring and dedicated in his work: "a prince among agents". Whilst there, authors he covered included Arthur C. Clarke, Morris West, M. M. Kaye, Elizabeth David, Mervyn Peake, John Fowles and Muriel Spark. One biographer notes that as an agent, Scott "sheltered nervous talents, supported frail ones, pruned back bogus growth, detected and cherished genuine achievement in the wildest and most undisciplined bolters."

Scott's first novel, Johnny Sahib, met with 17 rejections from publishers. It was eventually released in 1952, coming to win the Eyre & Spottiswoode Literary Fellowship Prize. He continued to work as a literary agent to support his family, but managed to publish regularly. The Alien Sky (US title, Six Days in Marapore) appeared in 1953, and was followed by A Male Child (1956), The Mark of the Warrior (1958), and The Chinese Love Pavilion (1960). He also wrote radio plays for the BBC: Lines of Communication (1952), Sahibs and Memsahibs (1958) and The Mark of the Warrior (1960).

In 1960 Scott walked away from his steady job as an agent and decided to become a full-time author. He played with various geographic settings in The Bender (1963) and Corrida at San Feliu (1964) with uneasy results. Funded by his publishers, Heinemann, Scott flew to India in 1964, in a last ditch effort to found a career as a successful novelist and, thereby, solvency. He drew there material for his next five novels, all set in India during and immediately after World War II, in the period leading to independence and Partition. For him, the British Raj was his extended metaphor. He wrote "I don't think a writer chooses his metaphors. They choose him."

Probably only an outsider could have commanded the long, lucid perspectives he brought to bear on the end of the British raj, exploring with passionate, concentrated attention a subject still generally treated as taboo, or fit only for historical romance and adventure stories... However Scott saw things other people would sooner not see, and he looked too close for comfort. His was a bleak, stern, prophetic vision and, like E. M. Forster's, it has come to seem steadily more accurate with time.

— Biographer Hilary Spurling

During his stay in Bombay he was hosted by Dorothy Ganapathy, whom he was close to for the rest of his life. He spent time in rural Andhra Pradesh with military comrades. His long standing gastric illness was exacerbated by the visit to India, and on his return he had to undergo painful treatment, but afterwards felt better than he had for many years and began to write.

In June 1964, aged 43, Scott began to write The Jewel in the Crown, the first novel of what was to become The Raj Quartet (1966). The remaining novels in the sequence were published over the next nine years: The Day of the Scorpion (1968), The Towers of Silence (1971) and A Division of the Spoils (1975). Scott wrote in relative isolation and only visited India twice more during the genesis of The Raj Quartet, in 1968 and in 1972, latterly for the British Council. He worked in an upstairs room at his home in Hampstead overlooking the garden and Hampstead Garden Suburb woodland. He supplemented his earnings from his books with reviews for The Times, the Times Literary Supplement, New Statesman and Country Life.

Scott's daughter noted, "It was as if he had exiled himself to the one room where there was nothing but the typewriter and the blank page... It was the making of him as a writer, but the unmaking of him as a human being."

In 1976 and 1977, the last two years of his life, Scott was invited to be a visiting professor at the University of Tulsa in Oklahoma. The financial offer was a great relief after his endless financial anxieties of his writing career. The University of Texas supported the author by offering to buy his manuscripts. His coda to The Raj Quartet, Staying On, was published in 1977, just before his second visit to Tulsa. Staying On won the Yorkshire Post Fiction Award and the Booker Prize in 1977. Scott was too unwell to attend the Booker ceremony in November 1977.

== Adaptations ==
Granada Television showed Staying On, with Trevor Howard and Celia Johnson as Tusker Smalley and his wife Lucy. The success of its first showing in Britain in December 1981 encouraged Granada to embark on the much greater project of making The Raj Quartet into a major 14-part television series known as The Jewel in the Crown, first broadcast in the United Kingdom in early 1984 and subsequently in the United States and many Commonwealth countries. It was rebroadcast in the UK in 1997 as part of the 50th anniversary celebrations of Indian independence, and in 2001 the British Film Institute voted it 22nd in the all-time best British television programmes. It was also adapted as a nine-part BBC Radio 4 dramatisation under its original title in 2005.

== Legacy ==
While Scott was teaching creative writing at the University of Tulsa in 1976, he arranged to sell his private correspondence to that university's McFarlin Library, thus making available some 6,000 personal letters. The materials begin in 1940, when Scott was enlisted in the British Army, and end only a few days before his death on 1 March 1978.

In the David Higham Collection at the Harry Ransom Humanities Research Center at the University of Texas at Austin can be found Scott's correspondence with clients Arthur C. Clarke, M. M. Kaye, Muriel Spark, children's author Mary Patchett, Peter Green, Morris West, Gabriel Fielding and John Braine.

Hilary Spurling wrote a full biography of Scott in 1991. Janis Haswell edited a two-volume collection of Scott's letters; Volume I, The Early Years (1940–1965) covers the military period of his life and the first stage of his career, before the quartet of novels was published. Volume II, The Quartet and Beyond (1966–1978) covers the end of his life.

== Personal life ==
In Torquay in 1941 Scott met and married his wife Penny (born Nancy Edith Avery in 1914). At the time she was a nurse at the Rosehill Children's Hospital; she later wrote four novels as Elizabeth Avery between 1959 and 1963; she died in 2005. They had two daughters, Carol (born 1947) and Sally (born 1948).

Towards the end of his life, Scott stated to his doctor that he was "eating little, sleeping less, and drinking a quart of vodka a day." Writer Peter Green wrote of his meeting with Scott: "In 1975, though still only in his mid-fifties, he was a dying man, and knew it. He was "an alcoholic wreck." Scott's wife Penny had supported him throughout the writing of The Raj Quartet, despite his heavy drinking and violent behaviour, but once it was complete she left him and filed for divorce.

In 1977, while he was in Tulsa, Scott was diagnosed with colon cancer. He died at the Middlesex Hospital in London on 1 March 1978.

== List of works ==
Early novels

- Johnnie Sahib (1952)
- The Alien Sky (also published as Six Days In Marapore) (1953)
- A Male Child (1956)
- The Mark of the Warrior (1958)
- The Chinese Love Pavilion (1960)
- The Birds of Paradise (1962)
- The Bender (1963)
- The Corrida at San Felíu (1964)

The Raj Quartet

- The Jewel in the Crown (1966)
- The Day of the Scorpion (1968)
- The Towers of Silence (1971)
- A Division of the Spoils (1975)

Later works

- Staying On (1977) (Winner of the Booker Prize)
- After The Funeral (1978) (19 page children's book, published posthumously)
