= The Towers of Silence =

1971 book by Paul Scott

- First edition (UK)
- Author: Paul Scott
- Language: English
- Genre: Historical novel
- Publisher: Heinemann (UK); William Morrow (US)
- Publication date: October 1971
- Publication place: United Kingdom
- Media type: Print (Hardback & Paperback)
- Pages: 392 pp (hardback edition)
- ISBN: 0-434-68110-5 (hardback edition)
- OCLC: 281509
- Dewey Decimal: 823/.9/14
- LC Class: PZ4.S428 To PR6069.C596
- Preceded by: The Day of the Scorpion
- Followed by: A Division of the Spoils

The Towers of Silence is the 1971 novel by Paul Scott that continues his Raj Quartet. It gets its title from the Parsi Towers of Silence where the bodies of the dead are left to be picked clean by vultures. The novel is set in the British Raj of 1940s India. It follows on from the storyline in The Day of the Scorpion.

== Plot introduction ==
The novel is set in the British Raj. It follows on from the storyline in The Jewel in the Crown and The Day of the Scorpion. Many of the events are retellings from different points of view of events that happened in the previous novels.

Much of the novel is in the form of epistolary, including interviews and reports of conversations and research from the point of view of a narrator. Other portions are in the form of letters from one character to another or entries in their diaries.

=== Setting ===
The story is set in the period 1939-1945 in several locations throughout India, particularly in a northern province of India. The province shares characteristics with Punjab and the United Provinces. The names of places and people suggest a connection to Bengal; however, the physical characteristics place the setting in north-central India, rather than in northeast India. The province has an agricultural plain and, in the north, a mountainous region.

The capital of the province is Ranpur. Another large city in the province is Mayapore, which was the key setting in The Jewel in the Crown. The princely state of Mirat is a nominally sovereign enclave within the province. Pankot is a "second class" hill station in the province which serves as a headquarters for the 1st Pankot Rifles, an important regiment of the Indian Army, who fought the Axis in North Africa. During the cool season, the regiment moves to Ranpur, on the plains. At Premanagar there is an old fortification that is used by the British as a prison. Another town, Muzzafirabad is the headquarters of the Muzzafirabad ("Muzzy") Guides, another Indian Army regiment. Other towns in the province are Tanpur and Nansera. Sundernagar is a "backwater town" in the province. Another hill station is in the Nanoora Hills.

== Plot summary ==
The novel begins with the story of Barbie Batchelor, a retired missionary schoolteacher, who finds a place as a paying guest with Mabel Layton, a member of the aristocracy of the English in India, at Rose Cottage in Pankot. Barbie and Mabel become close. Mabel tells Barbie that she will only go to Ranpur when she's buried, which Barbie interprets to mean that she wants to be buried in Ranpur, next to the grave of her late husband, James Layton. Barbie is not accepted by the upper-class of Pankot and is treated as a peculiar and unwanted intruder. She is haunted by the attack on Edwina Crane, another missionary schoolteacher, and by Edwina's subsequent suicide by fire. Pankot society does not know what to make of Barbie.

Barbie and Pankot society are disappointed that the important society wedding of Susan Layton and Teddie Bingham was held in Mirat and not Pankot. But they are consoled with the gossip of the momentous events: (1) Teddie's injury resulting from a stone being thrown at his car, (2) Susan's instinct to show obeisance to the Nawab, thus saving all from embarrassment at his being detained at the entrance, and (3) the appearance of Shalini Gupta Sen at the railway station when the couple are being seen off on their honeymoon and the scene she creates with her entreaties to Merrick which are later revealed to regard Hari Kumar's imprisonment.

Barbie buys a set of silver Apostle spoons as a wedding gift. In order to make up for having the wedding out of town, Mildred throws a buffet luncheon at the Pankot Rifles officers' mess for Pankot society. Barbie is puzzled that her gift of spoons is not displayed with the other wedding gifts.

Susan's pregnancy is announced and, several months later, news of Teddie's death arrives. While Sarah is in Calcutta visiting Merrick, who witnessed Teddie's death and was himself injured, Mabel Layton has a stroke and dies. Susan is witness to the old lady's death and the shock drives her into premature labor. Worried about the state of Mabel's soul, Barbie worms her way into the morgue at the hospital and thinks she sees the anguish of eternal torment on the face of her dead friend. She is then shocked to learn that Mabel will be buried in Pankot and not in Ranpur, as she had wished. She pleads with Mildred for her friend's last wish, but Mildred rebukes her harshly for interfering. Mildred gives Barbie until the end of the month to vacate Rose Cottage.

Susan and her son survive a difficult childbirth. Barbie moves in with the vicar and his wife, Arthur and Clarissa Peplow. Susan's behavior is troubling. She seems not to be relating to her child in a maternal way and is often distracted and distant. Remembering a fable about scorpions committing suicide when surrounded by fire told her by Barbie, Susan pours kerosene in a ring on the grass, puts her baby in the center and lights the fluid. The baby is quickly saved by a servant. However, it is now clear that there is something seriously wrong with Susan, and she is put under the care of a psychiatrist. Mildred blames Barbie for planting the idea in her mind and returns the Apostle spoons through Clarissa.

Barbie, deeply hurt by the insult, decides to make a gift of silver to the 1st Pankot Rifles. She then sets off in search of Captain Coley to deliver the goods. Arriving at Coley's bungalow in a rainstorm, Barbie sees Coley and Mildred having sex. Undetected by the lovers, she flees from the bungalow, but is caught in the rainstorm and falls seriously ill, coming down with bronchopneumonia.

It is discovered that Sarah is pregnant and that Jimmy Clark must have been responsible for it. Aunt Fenny agrees to take Sarah away surreptitiously for an abortion. Susan seems to be recovering under the care of psychiatrist Captain Samuels. Barbie, recovering from pneumonia, finally donates the spoons to the regiment. She gets a letter from Calcutta, offering her a position as a teacher in Dibrapur, the site of Edwina Crane's suicide.

Barbie encounters Merrick and presents him with her copy of the painting, "The Jewel in Her Crown". While leaving Rose Cottage, Barbie is physically and mentally injured in an accident and ends up at a sanatorium in Ranpur. Her view is of the Parsees' towers of silence of the title. Sarah visits her, but she cannot seem to get through. Barbie dies just as the atomic bomb is exploded over Hiroshima in August 1945.

== Critical reception ==
In a 1971 book review in Kirkus Reviews, an anonymous reviewer wrote the novel "retains the patient pace of the previous narratives and yet accelerates in stress as the raj era ends." The review summarized; "Old style, responsible artistry with a sustained and tireless vision."
