= Dalekmania (film) =

- VHS cover
- Directed by: Kevin Davies
- Produced by: John Farbrother
- Cinematography: Terry Doe; Dave Hicks; Robin Lee
- Edited by: Nick Elborough
- Production company: Amity Productions
- Distributed by: Lumiere Films
- Release date: 24 July 1995
- Running time: 57 minutes
- Country: United Kingdom
- Language: English

Dalekmania is a 1995 British direct-to-video documentary film about the 1960s Doctor Who film adaptations Dr. Who and the Daleks and Daleks' Invasion Earth 2150 A.D. In 1960s Britain, "Dalekmania" was the name given to the craze or "mania" among children for all things associated with the Daleks, recurring villains on Doctor Who. The documentary was directed by Kevin Davies.

== Overview ==
The documentary examines the Dalek craze with particular focus on the two 1960s Doctor Who films, Dr. Who and the Daleks and Daleks' Invasion Earth 2150 A.D., both of which star Peter Cushing as Dr. Who. Interviews cover the films' production and fan following.

The actors interviewed include Roberta Tovey, who played Dr. Who's granddaughter, Susan, and Jill Curzon, who played his niece Louise. There are also appearances from Barrie Ingham and Yvonne Antrobus, who played Thals in the first film.

The interviewees give personal accounts of the filming. Memories include an anecdote about a group of porters from Covent Garden Market being brought in to play male Thal extras, who were shocked to learn that their roles required them to shave their arms and chests and wear wigs and make-up.

The documentary also reveals that the stuntmen operating the Daleks were seemingly not treated well, as none of the other actors can remember seeing anyone get in or out of a Dalek or meeting any of the operators. The interviewees also recall working with cast members who have died, including Cushing and Roy Castle (Ian in the first film).

Also interviewed is Dalek creator Terry Nation, who discusses the differences between the Doctor Who TV series and the Dalek films. He explains the pride that he took in the Daleks and his efforts to protect their image. There are also contributions from Gary Gillatt and Marcus Hearn, editors of Doctor Who-related magazines, who explain the impact of the Daleks on the public's imagination.

== Production ==
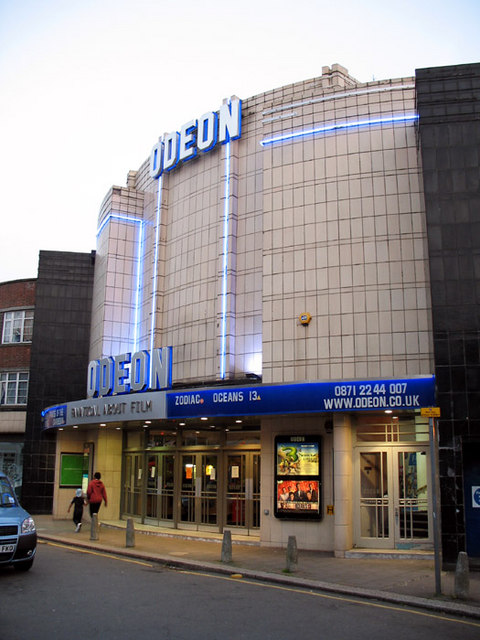
The Odeon in Muswell Hill, where the framing scenes were recorded (photo taken in 2007)

By the 1990s, Canal+ had acquired the rights to the Dalek films through its subsidiary StudioCanal. Lumiere Films, a home video distributor for Canal+, engaged Amity Productions to make the documentary.

While carrying out preparatory research at Pinewood Studios, director Kevin Davies re-discovered the degraded original soundtracks to both Dalek films in the Pinewood vaults. After restoration, the soundtracks were commercially released in 2010.

Dalekmania was filmed between 25 May and 17 June 1995. The first interview to be recorded was Curzon's, at London's Arundel House. Ingham and Antrobus were interviewed at the London studios of Limelight Productions on 2 June, followed by Tovey, Gillatt, Hearn and Eddie Powell (a stuntman on the second Dalek film) at the BBC Visual Effects Workshop on 17 June.

The documentary is framed by drama sequences showing a young brother and sister visiting a 1960s-style cinema, where they encounter a sinister commissionaire (played by Michael Wisher), followed by a prop Dalek, and then (as seen in the second film) a squad of Robomen and a Dalek spaceship. These sequences were shot at the Muswell Hill Odeon cinema (now the Everyman Cinema) on 11 June 1995. Miniature model effects were shot by the BBC Visual Effects Department on 17 June.

The documentary also includes scale model effects footage shot for Mission of Doom, an unofficial sequel to Daleks' Invasion Earth 2150 A.D. which was never completed. Mission of Doom was conceived by London-based model maker Julian Vince, who is interviewed in the documentary.

The documentary is dedicated to Cushing and Castle, who both died in 1994. The director of the Dalek films, Gordon Flemyng, does not appear in the documentary. He died less than two weeks before it was released.

== Release ==
Dalekmania was released on VHS on 24 July 1995 to coincide with a widescreen re-release of the Dalek films by Warner Bros. It also marked the 30th anniversary of the release of Dr. Who and the Daleks. In November 1995, the documentary was re-released as a limited-edition video box set.

The documentary was later included as a bonus feature on the Dalek films' DVD and Blu-ray releases. Due to a technical error, an introductory sequence was omitted from the DVD release; it was restored for the Blu-ray version.

== Reception ==
Reviewing the original VHS release for Doctor Who Magazine, Dave Owen recommended the documentary. He wrote that it was "aimed both at the serious film buff and the Doctor Who fan", describing it as "slightly dry" for the most part but "more focused and coherent" than Davies' earlier work, Thirty Years in the TARDIS. He praised the "particularly entertaining" contributions of Ingham and Antrobus as well as the "charming" frame sequences.

Simon Rose rated the documentary three stars out of five, commenting that it was "amazing to see these unpleasant, giant egg boxes being treated like pop stars." The Croydon Post called the inclusion of Vince's unofficial sequel footage "a major coup" for the documentary.

Reviewing the 2002 DVD re-issue, Erick Harper of DVD Verdict wrote that Dalekmania is "for diehards only" and has a "pretty low repeatability factor", but provides a "very nice supplement" to the Dalek films. He characterised the documentary as interesting and without surprises, instead being "very low key" with "a lot of pleasant reminiscing by those involved."

Reviewing the 2013 Blu-ray release, Cameron K. McEwan of CultBox described the documentary as "imaginative" and "fun", with "neat" frame sequences that "add to the weekend matinée feel of the piece. Utterly joyous."
