= Susan Foreman =

Fictional character in Doctor Who

- Doctor Who character
- Carole Ann Ford as Susan Foreman
- First appearance: An Unearthly Child (1963)
- Last appearance: "Wish World" (2025)
- Portrayed by: Carole Ann Ford
- Voiced by: Jane Asher, Claudia Grant
- Non-canonical appearances: Dimensions in Time (1993)
- Duration: 1963–1964, 1983, 1993, 2025

In-universe information
- Species: Gallifreyan
- Spouse: David Campbell
- Relatives: The Doctor (grandparent)
- Home: Gallifrey; Earth (adopted)

Susan Foreman (also known as Susan Campbell in spin-off media) is a fictional character in the British science fiction television series Doctor Who. The granddaughter of the Doctor and original companion of their first incarnation, she was played by actress Carole Ann Ford from 1963 to 1964, in the show's first season and the first two stories of the second season. Ford reprised the role for the 20th anniversary episode "The Five Doctors" (1983), the 30th anniversary charity special Dimensions in Time (1993), and the fifteenth series.

== Conception and development ==
The earliest scripts for the series had a completely different origin for the character of Susan, that of an alien princess named Suzanne – saved by the First Doctor from a world different from his own. Carole Ann Ford recalled that she was told her character would be "an Avengers-type girl – with all the kapow of that – plus she would have telepathic powers. She was going to be able to "fly the TARDIS" as well as [the Doctor] and have the most extraordinary wardrobe". However, none of this happened, as it was decided that the character would be more of an "ordinary" teenager, giving younger viewers a figure to identify with.

While the original outline for the series did not intend the pair to be related, writer Anthony Coburn created the family tie that Susan was the Doctor's granddaughter. According to founding producer Verity Lambert, "Coburn felt there was something not quite proper about an old man travelling around the galaxy with a young girl for a companion." Ford felt that the Doctor and Susan's relationship was different from that of later characters who had been branded as "companions" because she was also the Doctor's granddaughter.

Ford has stated that little background information on Susan's character or history was provided to her by the production team, and so to inform her performance, she would often discuss and invent ideas about Susan with her co-star William Hartnell. They established that the Doctor had "done something to annoy his own people" that had caused his and Susan's exile. Ford also points out that suggestions that Susan was not the Doctor's natural granddaughter were first put forward in the 1990s. However, in 2013, she revealed that the producers had initially insisted that Susan did not refer to the Doctor as her grandfather in "The Five Doctors" special. Ford recalled, "They said, 'We don't really want people to perceive him as having had sex with someone, to father a child.' I just screamed with hysterical laughter and said, 'In that case, I'm not doing it.'" The script was changed to include references to the characters' relationship.

Media historian James Chapman has written that the way Susan was written made her limited, because "she was required to fill the role of the 'screamer' and often had little to do beyond looking pretty and frightened". Ford was similarly displeased with her character, sometimes finding her "pathetic" and frustrating because she was not allowed to develop. In addition, Ford found the series too repetitive. Susan became the first companion to leave the programme, after just 51 episodes. Ford felt that Susan was allowed to develop more in the Big Finish audio dramas.

== Appearances ==
=== Television ===
Susan is introduced in the first Doctor Who story, An Unearthly Child (1963), with the first episode focusing on her as an unusual teenager with an advanced knowledge of history and science. This catches the attention of her teachers at Coal Hill School, Ian Chesterton (William Russell) and Barbara Wright (Jacqueline Hill), who follow her home to a junkyard owned by an unseen proprietor named I. M. Foreman. It is implied within the story that Susan took the surname "Foreman" from this junkyard sign as an alias for use at the school, for when her chemistry teacher assumed that her grandfather was "Doctor Foreman" the Doctor replied, "Doctor who? What's he talking about?", indicating that he was unfamiliar with the surname. It is revealed that she and her grandfather, the Doctor (William Hartnell), are exiles from their own people in "another time, another world" and have been travelling through space and time in a machine she named the TARDIS from the acronym "Time and Relative Dimension in Space". As Ian and Barbara have gained this knowledge, the Doctor whisks them away in the TARDIS against their will, but he cannot accurately fly the machine.

Susan continues to travel with the Doctor and her two teachers until the 1964 serial, The Dalek Invasion of Earth. During the events of that story, Susan falls in love with David Campbell (Peter Fraser), a young freedom fighter in the 22nd century. However, Susan feels that she has to stay with and take care of her grandfather. The Doctor, realising that Susan is now a grown woman and deserves a future away from him, locks her out of the TARDIS and leaves after a tearful farewell. Ford reprised the role of Susan on television in the 20th anniversary special "The Five Doctors" (1983), but no mention of David, or what became of him, was made on screen. In the novelisation of the same story, they are still married. Ford also reprised her role for the 1993 charity special Dimensions in Time.

In Attack of the Cybermen, after his regeneration, the Sixth Doctor confuses Peri Brown with names of his past companions including Susan. In The Curse of Fenric, the Seventh Doctor states that he does not know if he has any family. In "The End of the World", the Ninth Doctor states that his home world has been destroyed and that he is the last of the Time Lords. Although Susan is not mentioned by name, the Ninth Doctor says in "Father's Day" that his "whole family" died, and in "The Empty Child", Doctor Constantine remarks he has been a father and grandfather, but now he is neither, to which the Doctor replies, "I know the feeling." In "Fear Her", the Tenth Doctor states, "I was a dad once," but does not elaborate on this revelation. In "The Doctor's Daughter", the Doctor tells Donna Noble "I've been a father before... I lost all that a long time ago, along with everything else", admitting, "I can see them. The hole they left, all the pain that filled it". In "The Rings of Akhaten", the Eleventh Doctor recounts the occasion that he travelled with his granddaughter to the rings of the planet Akhaten. The 2013 episode "Journey to the Centre of the TARDIS" contains audio from the scene in An Unearthly Child where Susan explains how she named the TARDIS. A brief glimpse of Susan, played by an unidentified body double, is seen in the opening scene of "The Name of the Doctor", which depicts the Doctor and Susan leaving Gallifrey in the yet-to-be-camouflaged TARDIS.

Following the revelation in the 2013 specials, "The Day of the Doctor" and "The Time of the Doctor", that the Time Lords were not, as originally believed, wiped out by the Doctor, Susan's fate after "The Five Doctors" remains ambiguous. In "Death in Heaven" (2014), the Twelfth Doctor's (Peter Capaldi) companion Clara Oswald (Jenna Coleman) pretends to be the Doctor in order to confuse the Cybermen and buy herself time to escape; she describes the Doctor's children and grandchildren as "missing and, I assume, dead." In the Class episode "For Tonight We Might Die", Susan's name is displayed on the roll of honour at Coal Hill Academy, along with Clara Oswald and Danny Pink. A photograph of Susan is seen on the Doctor's desk in a university where he is lecturing in 2017's "The Pilot", beside a photograph of River Song. In the 2018 episode The Woman Who Fell to Earth, when asked by Yasmin Khan if she had any family, the Thirteenth Doctor replied, “No, lost them a long time ago”.

Susan as seen upon her reappearance in "The Interstellar Song Contest" (2025), which followed multiple references to the character in the Fifteenth Doctor's era.

When the Fifteenth Doctor visits 1963 with his companion Ruby Sunday ("The Devil's Chord"), he mentions that his younger self is currently living with Susan in Shoreditch, but he subsequently speculates that Susan is almost certainly probably dead now after the genocide of the rest of the Time Lords by the Master which is stated to have "rolled across time and space like a great, big cellular explosion," wiping out the species not just on Gallifrey, but across the universe.

Later in the season, ("The Legend of Ruby Sunday"), The Doctor believes that a woman who has been reoccurring through his travels (played by Susan Twist), is a regenerated version of Susan. This is dismissed after the villain of the finale, Sutekh, reveals that upon looking inside the TARDIS, he saw "(Susan's) name", and decided to use her as a trap to lure in the Doctor. He reveals that the recurring Susan Triad character, is in fact an apparition of his own design, and he has been planting them everywhere the TARDIS has landed since the TV story Pyramids of Mars.

The Doctor remarks in the season finale regarding Susan that "(He will) maybe find her again one day."

Susan returned in the sixth episode of the fifteenth series, "The Interstellar Song Contest" (2025). Now elderly, Susan appears in a series of visions to the Fifteenth Doctor after his life is endangered. Susan encourages the Doctor to find her and tries to stop him from torturing Kid. In "Wish World," Susan briefly appears on the Doctor's television screen while he is trapped in the world created by the Rani and Conrad Clark. However, the Doctor does not notice her appearance.

=== Other media ===
Susan's character has been expanded upon in spin-off media. In 1983, Doctor Who's then-script editor Eric Saward wrote a short story dealing with the Doctor's departure from Gallifrey for the Radio Times Doctor Who 20th Anniversary Special. This story, "Birth of a Renegade", depicts Susan as a descendant of Time Lord founder Rassilon and the last surviving member of Gallifrey's royal family, unrelated to the Doctor. A later script editor, Andrew Cartmel, had another explanation of Susan's origins. This account, part of the "Cartmel Masterplan", was not used in the programme, but was used as background for several of the Virgin New Adventures novels, most notably Lungbarrow by Marc Platt. In this version, Susan is the granddaughter of the mysterious Gallifreyan founder known as the Other, who may have been reincarnated as the Doctor. The Doctor had travelled back to the dawn of Time Lord civilisation and rescued Susan, who recognised him as her grandfather.

The character has also appeared in several licensed novels. She makes a cameo appearance in the 1994 New Adventures novel All-Consuming Fire and stars in the 1995 Virgin Missing Adventures novel The Sorcerer's Apprentice. She appears in three Past Doctor Adventures novels set within her time on the television programme, The Witch Hunters (1998), City at World's End (1999) and The Time Travellers (2005). The latter explains why the Doctor left Susan. During the events of that novel, the Doctor becomes involved in the British Army's time travel experiments, which risk him being noticed by the Time Lords. He then resolves to begin looking for a place where Susan can be safe and content so that if he is ever apprehended by their people, she will still be free. Susan reappears in the 1998 Eighth Doctor Adventures novel Legacy of the Daleks by John Peel, which takes place after the events of The Dalek Invasion of Earth. At the end of that novel, Susan comes into possession of the Master's TARDIS after he tries to capture her, and is once again able to roam time and space. The 2001 Telos novella Time and Relative takes place just prior to An Unearthly Child and involves Susan and several of her classmates from Coal Hill School trying to survive an alien invasion of Earth by a race of ice beings called the Cold and at the same time convince the Doctor to stop the attack. In the 2003 Telos novella Frayed, which also takes place prior to the serial An Unearthly Child, Susan's name was given to her from a young girl in a besieged human medical facility on another planet, after the girl's mother. The Eighth Doctor Adventures novel Sometime Never... depicts the Doctor's adoptive granddaughter Zezanne as an alien princess who would later travel to a junkyard in 1963 with a man who resembled the First Doctor. In the 2017 novel A Brief History of Time Lords, an image of Susan is shown as one of the things that the Doctor took with him when leaving Gallifrey, although she is listed as the President's daughter.

Susan also appears, played by Ford, in the Companion Chronicles audio drama series from Big Finish. Quinnis (2010) takes place before the television series, when the Doctor and Susan were traveling alone. In the Big Finish bonus release An Earthly Child (2010), Susan is reunited with the Doctor in his eighth incarnation (Paul McGann), and has a son named Alex (Jake McGann). She appears in the Eighth Doctor Adventures audio plays in Relative Dimensions (2010) and Lucie Miller / To the Death (2011). In the later Short Trip "All Hands on Deck", Susan decides to leave her life on Earth and join the Time War, with the box set Susan's War depicting her service in the War. She helps the Time Lords form an alliance with the Sensorites to gain the aid of their telepathic circuits- also recruiting Ian to act as a diplomat in the process- ("Sphere of Influence") and later missions including capturing a Dalek agent on Florana ("The Uncertain Shore") and preventing a plan to configure the vortex-dwelling Orovix as a weapon against the Daleks as Susan recognised that they were too dangerous ("Assets of War"). She was briefly manipulated by a Dalek agent to go back to 1963 to try and help them retrieve the Hand of Omega before the Hand could be used to destroy Skaro, but she and the Eighth Doctor are able to trick the Daleks into taking a fake Hand without alerting the Renegade Daleks of that era to the presence of the Time War Daleks ("The Shoreditch Intervention").

Ford also played an alternate version of Susan in Big Finish's Doctor Who Unbound audio plays Auld Mortality (2003) and A Storm of Angels (2005), in which Susan has become President of Gallifrey. In the 2003 Doctor Who Unbound play Exile, an alternative Doctor, whose latest regeneration was female (played by Arabella Weir), settles on Earth in 2003 using the identity and 1963 school records of Susan Foreman.

On 9 July 1994, BBC Radio 4 broadcast Whatever Happened to Susan Foreman?, a humorous investigation into Susan's background. Susan was portrayed by Jane Asher. In the 2013 BBC drama An Adventure in Space and Time, which told the story of the first three years of the show, Claudia Grant played Carole Ann Ford. Grant then went on to play Susan herself in a series of First Doctor stories for Big Finish.

In the short story, '"Press Play", the Thirteenth Doctor discovered a message in the TARDIS left for her by Susan informing her that before she had "activated the TARDIS record mode" before she left in The Dalek Invasion of Earth.

== Film version ==
Susan
- Dr. Who and the Daleks character
- First appearance: Dr. Who and the Daleks (1965)
- Last appearance: Daleks' Invasion Earth 2150 A.D. (1966)
- Adapted by: Milton Subotsky
- Portrayed by: Roberta Tovey
- Other appearances: Doctor Who: Thirty Years in the TARDIS (1993)

In-universe information
- Species: Human
- Family: Dr. Who (grandfather); Barbara; Louise (cousin)
- Home: Earth
- Home era: 1965–1966

In the films Dr. Who and the Daleks (1965) and Daleks' Invasion Earth 2150 A.D. (1966), Susan (portrayed by Roberta Tovey) is one of Dr. Who’s granddaughters. She is depicted as a more brave and resourceful child than her timid, teenage television counterpart.

=== Other media ===
==== Comics ====
The character also appears in the Dell comic strip adaptation of the film, the Doctor Who Magazine comic strip stories Daleks Versus the Martians and Dr. Who and the Mechonoids, and the short story The House on Oldark Moor by Justin Richards.

In Dr Who and the House on Oldark Moor, she and the others encountered an ancient Roman legion in 64 A.D., and subsequently travelled to Oldark Moor and met Count Tarkin.

In Doctor Who 3 - The Third Motion Picture, Susan realized that she and the others were only fictional constructs created by the Scriptwriter, and managed to reach out and pierce the Scriptwriter through the heart with a stake while the Scriptwriter was scripting a third Dr. Who movie, putting an end to the franchise and freeing herself from fictionality.

==== Other appearances ====
Roberta Tovey reprised the role of Susan for a minisode in the documentary More than... 30 Years in the TARDIS.

In the Dalek-infested London of the 22nd century, the Black and Red Dalek and two Robomen walk past a sign reading: ″IT IS FORBIDDEN TO DUMP BODIES IN THE RIVER″, as well as an inconspicuous police box, not recognising it as Tardis. After the Daleks have gone past, the doors open to reveal Susan, grinning at her successful stealth.

In an interview following the skit, Tovey harboured hopes of a follow-up to the two Cushing films centering on an adult version of her Susan, having taken on her grandfather's mantle as an adventurer in time and space, these plans never materialised.
