= Five Golden Dragons =

1967 film by Jeremy Summers

- 1967 theatrical poster
- Directed by: Jeremy Summers
- Screenplay by: Peter Welbeck
- Produced by: Harry Alan Towers
- Starring: Bob Cummings; Margaret Lee; Rupert Davies
- Cinematography: John Von Kotze (lighting cameraman)
- Edited by: Donald J. Cohen
- Music by: Composed and directed by Malcolm Lockyer
- Production company: Blansfilm Limited
- Distributed by: Anglo-Amalgamated; Constantin Film
- Release date: 4 August 1967
- Running time: 104 minutes
- Countries: United Kingdom; West Germany; Liechtenstein
- Languages: English; German

Five Golden Dragons is a 1967 international co-production action comedy film set in Hong Kong and photographed in Techniscope on location in September 1966 at the Tiger Balm Pagoda and Shaw Brothers studios. It was directed by Jeremy Summers and starred Bob Cummings in his final theatrical feature film, Margaret Lee who sings two songs in the film, Rupert Davies and a cast of "guest stars".

The film was produced and written (under pen name Peter Welbeck) by Harry Alan Towers and co-stars his wife Maria Rohm as one of the three female leads. The film features a minor connection to Edgar Wallace's short stories by using his Commissioner Sanders as an officer in the Royal Hong Kong Police with Towers referencing Wallace's name to attract funds from international film investors.

== Plot ==
The Five Golden Dragons are an international criminal gold trafficking secret society syndicate based in Hong Kong. They plan to break up after selling their criminal enterprise to the Mafia for US$50 million. However the members of the group fear the greed of each other in receiving their share of the profits. Visiting American playboy Bob Mitchell, as well as sisters Ingrid and Margret, become targets of killer Gert and his murderous accomplices, while Shakespeare-quoting police commissioner Sanders and his subordinate, Inspector Chiao investigate the matter. Sanders quotes Hamlet, act 1, scene 4, but Chiao corrects him, "Scene 5", and leaves. Sanders then quotes Merchant of Venice, act 1, scene 2.

Margret sneaks into Mitchell's hotel suite, looks through his papers and, when he returns, tells him she knows he is really "Doctor Mitchell, graduate of Stanford". She then confesses that, as a stewardess, she was working for the Dragons, but now fears for her life. In the morning, as Chiao knocks on the door of Mitchell's suite to take him for questioning by Sanders, the door to the bedroom, where Margret spent the night, is locked and, when opened, reveals her in bed, covered with a Dragons cape, dead as a result of a broken neck.

Mitchell sneaks out and, upon learning from his friend and helper Ah Sing about The Blue World nightclub, goes there to watch the club's star singer, Magda, perform "Time of Our Lives" while being observed by the club's shady manager Peterson. He tells Peterson, "I sell chewing gum... confections...

Magda spots Mitchell, sings to him, kisses him in front of Peterson and leads him to her dressing room where she asks him to help her change outfits. She then locks the room and goes out to perform another song, "Five Golden Dragons". When she finishes, the emcee introduces "one of Japan's most popular singing stars, Miss Yukari Ito", who performs a song in Japanese.

Meanwhile, in his office, Sanders struggles to remember a quote which Chiao finishes for him and adds that it is from "Henry Five". Sanders then adds, "Act 2, scene 1". Trapped in Magda's room, Mitchell discovers a secret passage to Peterson's office and escapes with Peterson's briefcase, but is intercepted by Chiao and his men and brought to Sanders' office. Exiting, he sees Ingrid outside and they leave together as Sanders closes the door and quotes Macbeth, act 4, scene 3.

One by one, four of the Dragons arrive in Hong Kong. When the second Dragon arrives, it is Chiao who provides the quote which Sanders recognizes as Othello. The Dragons are members of a secret society, each with a key to a cabinet. Each member wears a golden dragon head. When this scene is first used one of the dragons is revealed as Christopher Lee. The earlier scenes only have four dragons. Learning that Ingrid has been kidnapped, Mitchell argues with Sanders about rescuing her and storms out as Sanders, alone, quotes Othello, act 3, scene 2. Having captured Ah Sing and Ingrid, Gert menaces her, but Ah Sing manages to free himself and strangles Gert.

The climax of the film results from the arrival of Mitchell, disguised as the fifth dragon but, owing to a double-cross by Magda, Peterson switches places with Mitchell and, while still wearing his mask, is fatally shot by the gun concealed inside the cabinet he opens, thus inadvertently saving Mitchell's life. Immediately thereafter, Sanders and Chiao arrive in the Dragons' meeting room and arrest them as well as Magda.

When asked by Sanders about his plans, Mitchell replies, "Well, uh... I... I think that's... uh... more or less up to Ingrid... right? As Sanders and Chiao watch a plane take off from the airport, Sanders quotes, "That is the true beginning of our end" from Midsummer Night's Dream, act 4, scene 1.

== Cast ==
- Bob Cummings as Bob Mitchell
- Margaret Lee as Magda
- Rupert Davies as Commissioner Sanders
- with Klaus Kinski as Gert
- Maria Rohm as Ingrid
- Sieghardt Rupp as Peterson
- Roy Chiao as Inspector Chiao

and guest stars in alphabetical order

- Brian Donlevy as Third Dragon
- Dan Duryea as First Dragon
- Christopher Lee as Fourth Dragon
- George Raft as Second Dragon
- and Maria Perschy as Margret
- guest singer Yukari Itō

== Production notes ==
The film was one of three Harry Alan Towers made at the Hong Kong studios of Run Run Shaw the others being The Vengeance of Fu Manchu (also directed by Jeremy Summers, with Christopher Lee in the title role and Maria Rohm again named Ingrid) and The Million Eyes of Sumuru (with Klaus Kinski and Maria Rohm in supporting roles). In September 1966 Don Sharp was going to direct. The film originally planned to feature George Sanders and Basil Rathbone as two of the Dragons.

Cummings met his fourth wife Regina Fong who was a script girl on the film. Filmink felt Cummings "looks awful" in the movie in part due to his drug addiction at the time.

Five Golden Dragons was one of a number of lighthearted spy and action films released during the second half of the 1960s. A year earlier, in April 1966, two other films were released in London with a similar plot of a tourist being chased by assassins — A Man Could Get Killed, directed by Cliff Owen and Ronald Neame and starring James Garner as well as Harry Alan Towers' Our Man in Marrakesh, directed by Don Sharp and starring Tony Randall, with Klaus Kinski, Margaret Lee and uncredited Maria Rohm in supporting roles.

== Song credits ==
- Song "Five Golden Dragons" words by Hal Shaper
- Song "Time of Our Lives" words by Sid Colin
- The voice of Domino

== See also ==
- Christopher Lee filmography
