= Doctor Who and the Daleks =

Doctor Who and the Daleks may refer to:

- Doctor Who and the Daleks, a novelisation of the television serial The Daleks
- Dr. Who and the Daleks, a film starring Peter Cushing based on the television serial The Daleks
