= Rosemary Burrows =

British film costume designer and supervisor

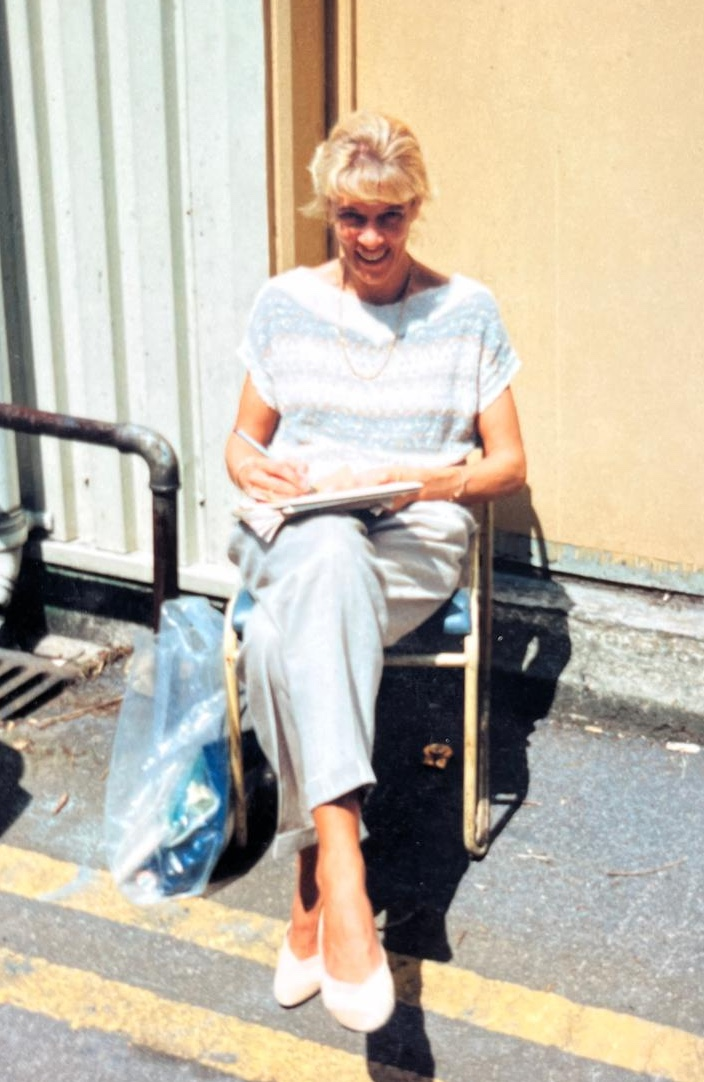
- Occupations: Costume supervisor and costume designer
- Spouse: Eddie Powell

Rosemary Burrows, also known as Rosie Burrows, was a wardrobe mistress and costume supervisor for British films, including many in the Hammer Horror series and James Bond franchise. She has over 100 credits from 1958 to 2005, and was recognised for her creativity and efficiency with budgets; one colleague at Hammer remembered, "her creative mind was utterly boundless".

== Career ==
Rosemary Burrows studied pottery at Berkshire College of Art before getting a job at Hammer's Bray studios, where she was paid £11 per week as assistant to Wardrobe Mistress Molly Arbuthnot. The first film she worked on was The Camp on Blood Island (1958).

Frequent Hammer actor Peter Cushing has described working at the Bray studios with "dear Rosemary Burrows and Mrs Arbuthnot, who looked after the wardrobe department, at the same time dispensing endless and most welcome cups of tea". After Arbuthnot's retirement, Burrows took on the role of Wardrobe Mistress and Wardrobe Supervisor for films including Quatermass and The Pit (1967) and At The Earth’s Core (1976), specialising in costuming low-budget horror films to a tight schedule.

Often, Burrows was brought on to manage wardrobe and buy or hire costumes when there was no overall costume designer. In this way, she dressed Bette Davis as The Nanny (1965), and Charlie Chaplin as a ship's steward for his final screen appearance in Countess from Hong Kong (1966).

From the 1970s, Burrows worked on higher budget films, often shot in larger studios and on location. Burrows supervised wardrobe on the James Bond film, The Spy Who Loved Me (1977), where she was described as being a "veteran... on hand to make sure the tailored suits and couture dresses looked good". She also had to negotiate difficulties obtaining authentic Russian uniforms, since this was during the Cold War, saying in a promotional interview for the film, "I got booted out of the embassy... we didn't get any co-operation [so] we faked the Russian uniform".

In the 1980s, Rosemary Burrows continued to work on location around the world, including working with costume designer Judy Moorcroft on A Passage to India (1984), directed by David Lean. Lean's biographer recounted an incident when the director confronted Burrows during filming, when an actor was not wearing a silk scarf mentioned in the script. Rosemary, although "bemused", quickly produced a "gossamer scarf" that fluttered as the director required.

One of Rosemary Burrows' longstanding collaborations was with costume designer Anthony Powell. They worked together on six films: Death on the Nile (1978), Priest of Love (1981), Evil Under the Sun (1982), Ishtar (1987), 101 Dalmatians (1996) and 102 Dalmatians (2000). Rosemary Burrows received co-designer credit on 101 Dalmatians (1996), for which she and Powell were nominated for an OFTA film award and ACCA award. Glenn Close's costumes for 101 Dalmatians and 102 Dalmatians were part of the actor's personal collection until 2017, when they were donated to the Eskenazi School of Design at Indiana University, where they were later exhibited.

As costume supervisor on the film Gladiator (2000), with designer Janty Yates, Rosemary Burrows managed the logistics of dressing hundreds of extras for the opening battle scene of the film. When Janty Yates won the Best Costume Design Oscar for Gladiator, in her acceptance speech she stated, “I couldn’t have done it without Rosemary Burrows, Annie Hadley and Sammy Howarth”.

== Reputation ==
Christopher Neame, one of Rosemary Burrows' collaborators at Hammer, noted the skills she needed to dress actors in period dress with Hammer's very low budgets:

“As wardrobe mistress-cum-designer, Rosemary was responsible for countless costumes, many of great richness and others perfectly befitting the so-often-featured peasants of Anthony Hinds’ scripts. Her style expressed depth and authenticity and her creative mind was utterly boundless... What Rosemary achieved on a limited budget is extraordinary, and it is that kind of situation, having one’s back to the wall, that brings out her true talent.”

Neame has called for Rosemary Burrows' costume work to be given greater credit within critical appraisals of Hammer films, particularly her contribution to Demons of the Mind.

== Personal life ==
Burrows married the actor and stuntman Eddie Powell in 1966.
