= Yvonne Antrobus =

Novelist, abridger, radio dramatist and actress (born 1940)

- Born: Yvonne Daphne Antrobus; 1 November 1940 (age 86); Cheltenham, UK
- Occupations: Novelist, abridger, radio dramatist, actress
- Years active: 1963–1996
- Spouse: David Benedictus (m. 1971; div. 2002)
- Children: 2

External image
- Photo of Antrobus at Europeana

Yvonne Daphne Antrobus (born 1 November 1940) is a British novelist, abridger, radio dramatist, and actress.

== Writing ==
She has made over 100 abridgements and dramatisations for BBC Radio 3 and BBC Radio 4 and for independent audio publishers, including Vernon God Little by DBC Pierre, The British Journalist by Andrew Marr and Days From A Different World by John Simpson. She was awarded the Abridgers' Silver Award by the Audio Book Association in 2003 for Churchill by Roy Jenkins. In 2009 BBC Radio 4 broadcast her series Diary of an On-Call Girl, based on the blogs and book by 'WPC Ellie Bloggs', the anonymous blogger who is also a serving British police officer.

Antrobus has written two crime novels: True to Form (1998) and Cut in the Ground (1999).

== Acting ==
Among Antrobus' television appearances are Dixon of Dock Green (1963), Redcap (1965), Emergency Ward 10 (1967), The Benny Hill Show (1967), The First Churchills (1969), Z-Cars (1970), Steptoe and Son (1972), The Protectors (1973), Wessex Tales (1973), Within These Walls (1974), Thomas & Sarah (1979), The Bill (1989), The Chief (1990), and On Dangerous Ground (1996).

Her other work includes appearances in London's West End, in productions such as Noises Off. She is a winner of a London Theatre Critics' Award for Best Supporting Actress.

Her film credits include Dr. Who and the Daleks (1965), The Pleasure Girls (1965) and Mister Quilp (1975). While being interviewed for the 1995 documentary Dalekmania (1995), she revealed that she had been unavailable for post-synchronisation work on Dr. Who and the Daleks, so her voice had been dubbed by another, unnamed actress.

=== Partial film and TV credits ===
Year	Title	Role	Notes
1965	The Pleasure Girls	Waitress	Film
1965	Dr. Who and the Daleks	Dyoni	Film
1966–1967	The Wednesday Play	(various roles)	TV series
1969	The First Churchills	Anne Churchill	TV serial
1975	Mister Quilp	Betsy Quilp	Film
