= Dr. Who (Dalek films) =

Fictional character

- Peter Cushing as Doctor Who
- First appearance: Dr. Who and the Daleks (1965)
- Last appearance: Daleks' Invasion Earth 2150 A.D. (1966)
- Based on: The Doctor by Sydney Newman
- Adapted by: Milton Subotsky
- Portrayed by: Peter Cushing

In-universe information
- Occupation: Inventor
- Family: Susan, Barbara (granddaughters); Louise (niece)
- Home: Earth
- Home era: 20th century

Doctor Who is a character based on the Doctor, the protagonist featuring in the long-running BBC science fiction television series Doctor Who.

The character, portrayed by Peter Cushing, appeared in two films produced by AARU Productions, Dr. Who and the Daleks (1965) and Daleks' Invasion Earth 2150 A.D. (1966). Plans for a third film were abandoned following the poor box office reception for the second film.

Cushing made no mention of the films in his autobiography, although he kept a collection of newspaper clippings about them in a scrapbook.

== Personality ==
While the original version of the character shown on the TV series was depicted as an abrasive, patronising, and cantankerous extraterrestrial, the movie's incarnation played by Cushing is an avuncular, eccentric inventor who claims to have created a time machine, named the Tardis, in his back garden. He is a gentle, grandfatherly figure, naturally curious, sometimes absent-minded but not afraid to fight for justice. He is shown to have a keen and somewhat juvenile sense of humour, a strong sense of adventure, an iron will, and strong morals.

Unlike his TV counterpart, whose true name is never revealed, his surname is clearly stated to be "Who" in both films. However, he is most commonly referred to as ‘the Doctor’, as his surname is only stated occasionally in the first film, and just once in the second film.

== Companions ==
In the first film, Dr. Who travels with his two granddaughters: Susan (Roberta Tovey), who is portrayed as a younger character than the Susan depicted in the TV series, and Barbara (Jennie Linden). They are joined by Ian Chesterton (Roy Castle), Barbara's "new boyfriend", who is depicted as a generally clumsy and comical figure (whereas the TV version of the character is more heroic, and his relationship with Barbara is amicable and professional rather than romantic).

In the sequel, Susan is joined by Dr. Who's niece Louise (Jill Curzon) and police constable Tom Campbell (Bernard Cribbins).

== Tardis ==
The exterior of Dr. Who's Tardis (not "the TARDIS", as referred to in the television series) resembles a British police box, although the films, unlike the TV series, offer no explanation as to why the machine has this appearance. Other than using the contrivance of the craft's interior being larger than its exterior, the interior set bears no relation to the clean, high-tech TV version of the time. In the first film it is filled with a chaotic jumble of wiring and electronic equipment, replaced in the second film by a number of simple consoles adorned with buttons, gauges and lights.

== Continuity ==
When Cushing was asked how his Doctor fit into the continuity of the series, he said, "One of the few episodes of the Doctor Who series that I saw involved a kind of mystical clown (The Celestial Toymaker), and I realised that perhaps he kidnapped Doctor Who and wiped his memory and made him relive some of his earlier adventures. When Bill Hartnell turned into Patrick Troughton and changed his appearance, that idea seemed more likely. I think that's what happened, so I think those films we did fit perfectly well into the TV series."

In the 2018 novelisation of "The Day of the Doctor", it is established that in the Doctor Who universe, these two Dr. Who movies are fiction movies, Peter Cushing was an actor, and the actual Doctor approved of these movies. This has been described as "corrective canon".

== Other appearances ==
In addition to the two films, Dr. Who has appeared in other media.

=== Comic strips ===
Three comic strips have been published featuring the Dr. Who character; a Dell comic book adaptation of the film (1966), followed by the stories Daleks Versus the Martians (1996) and Dr. Who and the Mechonoids (2022) in Doctor Who Magazine.

=== Books ===
The short story "The House on Oldark Moor" by Justin Richards was published in the BBC Books collection Short Trips and Sidesteps (2000). Dr. Who is also referenced in Steven Moffat’s novelisation of "The Day of the Doctor" (2018), in which the tenth and eleventh Doctors are stated to be fans of the Dalek movies and friends of Cushing. This was brought to the attention of UNIT when he started to show up in films made after his death.

Obverse Books have published a series of unofficial books to support charities, featuring Cushing's Dr. Who character. The series started with novelisations of the two films and continued with "novelisations" of fictional films based on BBC Doctor Who serials. The book series also includes short story collections based on a fictional radio series, posited as a continuation of the unaired radio series pilot. The authors of these books prefer to remain anonymous, so various pseudonyms are used.

- Dr Who and the Daleks (2019, novelisation by "Alan Smithee")
- Daleks Invasion Earth 2150AD (2019, novelisation by "Alan Smithee")
- Dr Who and the Ice Men from Mars (2019, by "Alan Smithee")
- The Tenth Planet Invades the Moonbase (2019, by "Alan Smithee")
- Dr Who and the Yeti Invasion of London (2020, by "David Agnew")
- Dr Who: Journey into Time (2020, short story collection edited by "David Agnew")
- Dr Who and the Auton Attack (2020, by "David Agnew")
- Dr Who and the Curse of the Dæmons (2020, by "David Agnew")
- Dr Who: Escape to Danger (2022, short story collection edited by "Robin Bland")
- Dr Who: Missions to the Unknown (2022, short story collection edited by "Guy Leopold")
- Dr Who and the Claus of Axos (2022, by "Robin Bland")
- Dr Who's Greatest Adventure (2023, by "Robin Bland")
- Dr Who: The Brink of Disaster (2024, short story collection edited by "Stephen Harris")
- Doctor Who: The Six Doctors (2024, by "Robin Bland")
- Dr Who and the Deadly Snows (2025 by "Guy Leopold")

== Cancelled third film ==
There were plans for a third film based on the Doctor Who television serial The Chase, but these were abandoned following the poor box office reception for Daleks' Invasion Earth 2150 A.D..

In 1984, after failing to finance King Crab (a horror film based on Guy N. Smith's Night of the Crabs), Milton Subotsky (who produced the 1960s Dalek films) adapted the screenplay into a Doctor Who film with two Doctors. Subotsky envisioned Jon Pertwee or Tom Baker as the older Doctor, and a new actor as the younger one. The film's working title was The Lossiemouth Affair, and it became Dr Who's Greatest Adventure. Subotsky pursued production of the film until his death in 1991.

Roberta Tovey reprised her role as Susan for a minisode in the documentary More than... 30 Years in the TARDIS. Set in a Dalek-infested London of the 22nd century, it shows a Black and Red Dalek and two Robomen moving past Tardis without noticing it. After they leave, the doors open to reveal Susan, grinning at her successful stealth. In an interview following the skit Tovey revealed her hopes for a follow-up to the two Cushing films, centring on an adult version of their Susan having taken on her grandfather's mantle as an adventurer in time and space. Such a film never materialised, however.

== Proposed radio series ==
During the late 1960s, there were plans for a radio series starring Peter Cushing as the voice of Dr. Who. Under a collaboration between Stanmark Productions and Watermill Productions, a pilot was recorded and a further 52 episodes were to be produced. The pilot story (entitled Journey into Time) featured Dr. Who and his granddaughter travelling to the time of the American Revolution. The script was written by future Doctor Who TV series writer Malcolm Hulke. Although the recording was subsequently lost, the script was novelised by Obverse Books in 2019.
