= Joe Powell (stuntman) =

English actor and stuntman (1922–2016)

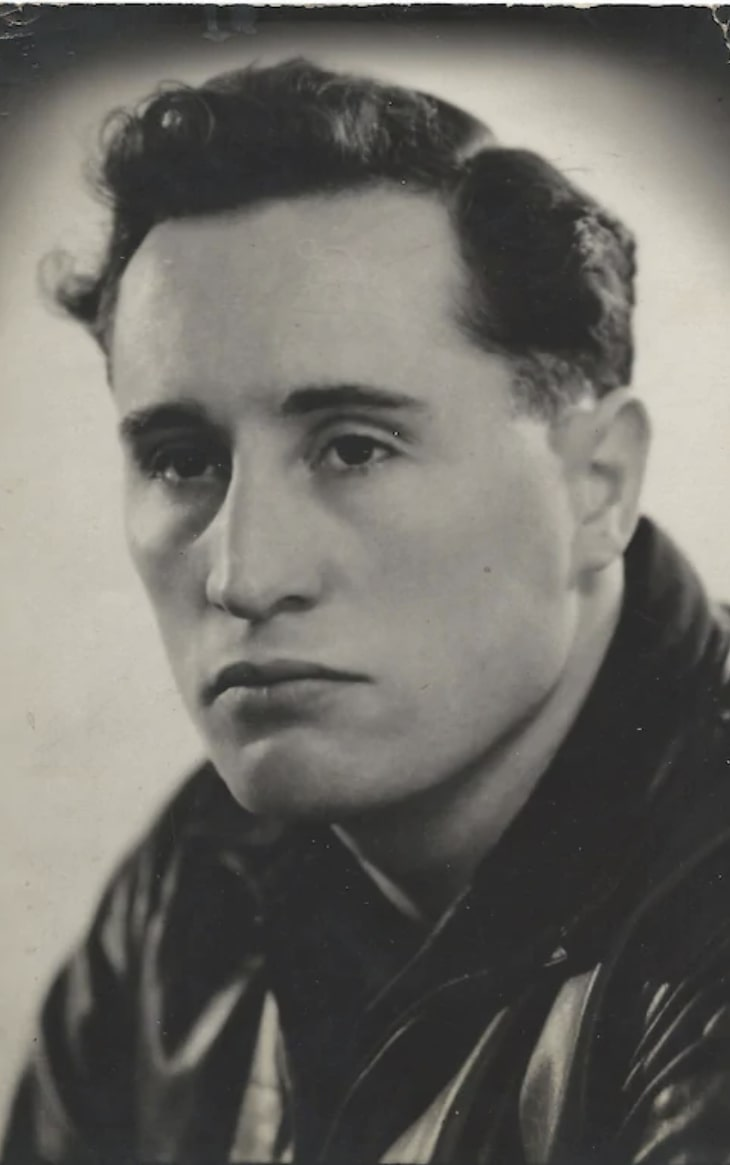
- Powell in the late 1940s.
- Born: Joseph Augustus Powell; 21 March 1922; Shepherd's Bush, London, England, U.K.
- Died: 30 June 2016 (aged 94); London, England, U.K.
- Occupations: Stuntman, actor
- Years active: 1947–1986
- Children: 4
- Relatives: Eddie Powell (brother)

Joe Powell (21 March 1922 – 30 June 2016) was an English stuntman and actor. He was known as the "daddy of British stuntmen".

== Early life and career ==
Powell was born in Shepherd's Bush, London.

He joined the British Army and served in the 1st Battalion Royal Fusiliers Cadet Corps. He enjoyed soldiering, and soon after the outbreak of the Second World War, when he was still only 17, he joined the Grenadier Guards. To break the monotony of drill and PT he took up boxing with the regimental team, but as the war progressed he was selected for No 4 Special Service (Commando) unit, taking part in the 1942 raid on Dieppe, during which he was briefly knocked out, and in the D-Day invasion.

In 1946, he met with the actor Dennis Price which led to him getting a job as an extra at Pinewood Studios. He was sparring at the London's Polytechnic Boxing Club and soon became a founding partner in a stunt team by Captain Jock Easton.

Powell performed stuntwork in many films, including The Guns of Navarone (1961), The Longest Day (1962), Cleopatra (1963), Zulu (1964), Those Magnificent Men in Their Flying Machines (1965) and The Man Who Would Be King (1975). He also participated in several James Bond films.

Powell is listed by The Guardian as having performed one of the ten-best film stunts ever.

== Personal life and family ==
Powell was twice married, first to Marguerite and after to Juliet. Powell was survived by four sons and a daughter. He was the brother of Eddie Powell, also a film stuntman.

== Publications ==
Powell also published a book on his life known as The Life and Times of a Fall Guy.

== See also ==
- List of English actors
- List of English writers
- List of people from London
