= Daleks' Invasion Earth 2150 A.D. =

1966 British science fiction film by Gordon Flemyng

- UK quad poster
- Directed by: Gordon Flemyng
- Written by: Milton Subotsky; David Whitaker
- Based on: The Dalek Invasion of Earth by Terry Nation
- Produced by: Milton Subotsky; Max J. Rosenberg
- Starring: Peter Cushing; Bernard Cribbins; Ray Brooks; Jill Curzon; Roberta Tovey; Andrew Keir
- Cinematography: John Wilcox
- Edited by: Ann Chegwidden
- Music by: Bill McGuffie
- Production companies: AARU Productions; British Lion Films; Amicus Productions
- Distributed by: British Lion-Columbia Distributors
- Release date: 5 August 1966
- Running time: 84 minutes
- Country: United Kingdom
- Language: English
- Budget: £286,000

Daleks' Invasion Earth 2150 A.D. is a 1966 British science fiction film directed by Gordon Flemyng and written by Milton Subotsky, and the second of two films based on the British science-fiction television series Doctor Who. It stars Peter Cushing in a return to the role of the eccentric inventor and time traveller Dr. Who, Roberta Tovey as Susan, Jill Curzon as Louise and Bernard Cribbins as Tom Campbell. It is the sequel to Dr. Who and the Daleks (1965).

The story is based on the Doctor Who television serial The Dalek Invasion of Earth (1964), produced by the BBC. The film was not intended to form part of the ongoing storylines of the television series. Elements from the programme are used, however, such as various characters, the Daleks, and a police box time machine, albeit in re-imagined forms.

== Plot ==
Special Constable Tom Campbell encounters a jewellery shop burglary. Running to what appears to be a police box to summon backup, he enters Tardis, a time and space machine operated by its inventor Dr. Who, his niece Louise and his granddaughter Susan, as it departs for the future. Arriving in London, 2150 A.D., they find that Daleks have invaded the Earth. Some survivors have become resistance fighters, while captives are either turned into brainwashed 'Robomen' servants, or forced to labour at a mine in Bedfordshire.

Dr. Who and Tom are captured and imprisoned on a Dalek spaceship. Meanwhile a rebel, Wyler, takes Louise and Susan to a London Underground station resistance base, where they meet fighters including David, and Dortmun who plans to bomb the Dalek spaceship using rebels disguised as Robomen.

On the spaceship, Dr. Who and Tom avoid being robotised when the rebels, including David, Wyler and Louise, attack. Dr. Who escapes with David, while Tom and Louise become trapped on the spaceship. After the attack fails, Wyler returns to the base and informs Dortmun and Susan that Dr. Who escaped. They decide to hide in London's outskirts until the rebels can regroup. Susan writes a message about their intentions for Dr. Who, then they commandeer a van. Dortmun is killed by a Dalek patrol, and Wyler and Susan have to abandon the vehicle just before it is destroyed.

Dr. Who and David manage to return to the now deserted underground station. Failing to see Susan's message, they assume that Wyler, Dortmun and Susan have gone to Bedfordshire to investigate the mining operation and decide to follow them.

Hiding on the Dalek spaceship, now bound for the mine, Tom and Louise reunite. When the craft lands they escape from it. Finding themselves in the mining complex, they are saved from a Roboman by one of the slave-workers, who hides them in a tool shed.

Wyler and Susan shelter in a cottage, occupied by a mother and daughter. Susan convinces Wyler that Dr. Who would head for the Bedfordshire mine, and that they must follow. The daughter then leaves on an errand, but returns with Daleks who capture Wyler and Susan and take them to their mine control centre.

Near the mine Dr. Who and David are confronted by black marketeer Brockley, who agrees to smuggle them into the complex. By chance, he leads them to the tool shed where Tom and Louise are hiding. They are joined by a prisoner, Conway. He reveals that the Daleks intend to drop a bomb into their mineshaft, to destroy the Earth's core and replace it with a device enabling the planet to be piloted like a giant spacecraft. Stolen plans show an old shaft leading to a convergence between the planet's magnetic poles. Realising that an explosion at this point would release enough energy to destroy the metallic Daleks, Tom and Conway agree to try deflecting the bomb while Louise and David go to help evacuate the prisoners from the mine. Brockley leaves, refusing to get involved, but returns with a group of Daleks. As Dr. Who is led away the Daleks fire on Brockley, killing him.

Tom and Conway enter the mineshaft but are discovered by a Roboman. During the ensuing fight Conway and the Roboman fall to their deaths. Tom uses old timbers to create a deflecting ramp, then leaves. Dr. Who is taken to the mine control room and meets Wyler and Susan. He seizes the radio link to the Robomen and orders them to turn against their masters. The Robomen and Daleks fight, while everybody else flees from the mine. The Daleks quickly defeat the rebellion and release their bomb into the shaft, but the device is deflected and detonates at the pole convergence. The Daleks are pulled into the Earth's core and destroyed, while their spaceship crashes onto the mine and explodes.

As the travellers prepare to return to the present in Tardis, Tom asks to be taken back to a few minutes before the burglary occurred. Upon arrival, he knocks out the thieves and drives them away in their getaway car, heading for the police station and anticipating a promotion.

== Cast ==
- Peter Cushing as Dr. Who
- Bernard Cribbins as Tom Campbell
- Ray Brooks as David
- Andrew Keir as Wyler
- Roberta Tovey as Susan
- Jill Curzon as Louise
- Roger Avon as Wells
- Geoffrey Cheshire as Roboman
- Keith Marsh as Conway
- Philip Madoc as Brockley
- Steve Peters as Lead Roboman
- Eddie Powell as Thompson
- Godfrey Quigley as Dortmun
- Peter Reynolds as Man on Bicycle
- Bernard Spear as Man with Carrier bag
- Sheila Steafel as Young Woman
- Eileen Way as Old Woman
- Kenneth Watson as Craddock
- John Wreford as Robber
- Robert Jewell – Lead Dalek Operator
- David Graham and Peter Hawkins – Dalek Voices (uncredited)

A number of the film's cast have also had roles in the Doctor Who television series. Bernard Cribbins appeared as recurring character Wilfred Mott between 2007 and 2010 and in 2023, during which it is revealed that he is the grandfather of companion Donna Noble. Philip Madoc appeared four times in the series and in a number of Big Finish Productions Doctor Who audio adventures in different roles. Eileen Way appeared as Old Mother in the Doctor Who TV serial An Unearthly Child and as Karela in The Creature from the Pit. Roger Avon appeared as Saphadin in The Crusade and as Daxtar in The Daleks' Master Plan. Robert Jewell was a Dalek and creature operator, and David Graham and Peter Hawkins provided Dalek and other voices, in the series.

== Production ==
Amicus bought an option to make three Dalek-related stories from Terry Nation and the BBC for £500. Production of the third film, to be based on the serial The Chase, was scrapped because of this film's under-performance at the box-office. Principal photography commenced at Shepperton Studios, England, on 31 January 1966, and was completed on 22 March, eleven days behind schedule. The film's budget of £286,000 was nearly sixty per cent larger than its predecessor.

Production was complicated by the illness of Cushing, which required some rewriting of the script to reduce his on-screen appearances. There were also a number of accidents on set. A Dalek prop caught fire during the filming of rebels storming the Dalek spaceship. Stuntman Eddie Powell broke his ankle during a scene in which his character is killed by the Daleks while trying to escape from them. Actor Andrew Keir hurt his wrist when punching through a van windscreen during a sequence in which his character, Wyler, and Susan escape from London.

The design and colour scheme for the majority of the Dalek props was very similar to that used for the television versions at the time, having large, black bases and predominantly silver paintwork, with grey shoulders, natural aluminium collars and slats and blue hemispheres. Three Dalek leaders are also shown, painted respectively in gold, black and red. As with the first Dalek film, the props were fitted with larger dome light than their TV counterparts, and some were equipped with a mechanical claw in place of the standard plunger. The film marks the first instance of the Daleks using rels as a time measurement; this would be used in comics and later in the revived series.

In January 1984, an article about the two Dalek films appeared in Doctor Who Monthly containing production information, photographs and interviews. Another article about the films appeared in the 1995 Spring Special edition of Doctor Who Magazine.

In 1995, a documentary about the two Dalek films, Dalekmania, was released on video. It revealed details about the productions, spin-offs, and publicity campaigns. It was later included as an extra in many of the home media video releases of the two Dalek films.

== Release ==
The film premiered in London on 22 July 1966.

== Marketing ==
Of the film's £286,000 budget, over £50,000 was spent on promotion.

The breakfast cereal Sugar Puffs sponsored the film and, in an example of product placement, Sugar Puffs signs and products can be seen at various points in the film. In exchange for its funding, the company was also allowed to run a competition on its cereal packets to win a Dalek film prop, and feature the Daleks in its television advertisements.

From 1965 to 1967, the TV Century 21 comic featured a one-page Dalek comic strip. From January 1966 onward artists Eric Eden and Ron Turner depicted the Daleks using elements from the film design, including mechanical claws and large bases and dome lights. During the run of the strip, the comic also often featured photographs from, and articles about, the films.

== Critical response ==
The film was given a negative review in The Times newspaper on 21 July 1966: "The second cinematic excursion of the Daleks shows little advance on the first... The filming of all this is technically elementary... and the cast, headed by the long-suffering, much ill-used Peter Cushing, seem able, unsurprisingly, to drum up no conviction whatever in anything they are called to do. Grown-ups may enjoy it, but most children have more sense."

Alan Jones of the Radio Times gave the film three stars out of five in a retrospective review in 2015, stating "Independence Day it's not, but director Gordon Flemyng keeps the colourful action moving swiftly along to cheap and cheerful effect. Youngsters will love it, while adults will want to E-X-T-E-R-M-I-N-A-T-E Bernard Cribbins, who provides comic relief as the bumbling bobby. Yet, through all the mindless mayhem roll the ever-impressive Daleks, truly one of science fiction's greatest alien creations."

In a review of the 2013 Blu-ray release, Starburst reviewer Paul Mount said the feature was "a leaner, slicker film than its predecessor, its bigger scale and lavish location filming giving the story room to breathe and allowing for some effective action sequences, such as the rebel attack on the impressive Dalek flying saucer."

== Radio adaptation ==
The film's soundtrack was adapted and presented by Gordon Gow for radio broadcast on the BBC Light Programme on 18 November 1966 as Show 305 of the Movietime series. It was produced by Tony Luke.

== Home media ==
Super 8 film

- Released in the UK by Walton Sound and Film Services in 1977.

VHS

- Released in the UK by Thorn EMI in 1982 and by Warner Home Video in 1988 and 1996.
- Released in the US by Thorn EMI in 1985 and by Lumiere in 1994.
- Released in Australia by Warner Home Video in 1990.
- Released in Japan by King Video/Tohokushinsha Film Co. in 1992.

Betamax

- Released in the UK by Thorn EMI in 1982.

DVD

- Both films, plus the Dalekmania documentary, released in the US by Anchor Bay Entertainment as a boxset in 2001 and by Lionsgate as a two-disc set in 2012.
- Both films, plus the Dalekmania documentary, released in Australia by StudioCanal as a two-disc boxset in 2001.
- The film, plus the Dalekmania documentary, released in France (as Les Daleks Envahissent La Terre, with original French soundtrack) by Canal+video in 2001.
- Both films, plus the Dalekmania documentary, released in the UK by StudioCanal as a two-disc boxset in 2002 and 2006.
- Released in Spain (as Los Daleks Invaden la Tierra 2150 AD, with original Spanish soundtrack) by Universal Pictures Iberia S.L.. in 2009
- Released in Australia by Umbrella Entertainment in 2012 together with the Dalekmania documentary.

Blu-ray

- The film, plus the Dalekmania documentary, released in the UK by StudioCanal in 2013.
- Both films, released in the UK by StudioCanal/Optimum Releasing as a two-disc box set in 2013.
- Released in the UK by StudioCanal as a Zavvi exclusive 'SteelBook' limited edition in 2015.
- Released in Australia by Umbrella Entertainment in 2014 together with the Dalekmania documentary.
- The film, plus the Dalekmania documentary, released in the US by Kino Lorber in 2020.
- A restored and remastered version released on 4K UHD disc by StudioCanal, in both Limited Edition and standard Steelbook formats in 2022.

== Soundtrack ==
Dr. Who & the Daleks

Soundtrack album by Malcolm Lockyer, Bill McGuffie, Barry Gray
- Released: 5 October 2009
- Genre: Soundtrack
- Label: Silva Screen Records
- Producer: Mark Ayres

Music from both Dr. Who and the Daleks and Daleks' Invasion Earth 2150 A.D. was released by Silva Screen Records on a CD entitled Dr. Who & the Daleks in 2009 and on a limited edition double vinyl LP in 2016. Selected tracks from both films were released by Silva Screen Records as a limited edition 7-inch EP in 2011. Music from the film was released on an LP by StudioCanal in 2022 as part of a package also including 4K UHD and Blu-ray discs of the film.

=== Track listing ===
Dr. Who and the Daleks (Malcolm Lockyer)
No.	Title	Length
1.	"Fanfare and Opening Titles"	1:48
2.	"Tardis"	0:48
3.	"The Petrified Jungle"	1:58
4.	"The Petrified Creature and the City"	0:52
5.	"Four Return To Tardis"	1:05
6.	"The Medicine Box and the Climb to the City"	2:24
7.	"City Corridors"	1:54
8.	"Captured by the Daleks"	1:18
9.	"Susan Leaves the City"	1:17
10.	"The Jungle at Night"	2:13
11.	"Susan Returns to the City"	1:12
12.	"Escape from the Cell"	3:05
13.	"The Trap"	3:44
14.	"The Swamp"	2:37
15.	"The Mountain"	2:34
16.	"The Cave"	1:57
17.	"The Jump"	0:54
18.	"The Thals Approach the City"	1:40
19.	"The Countdown"	2:38
20.	"The Countdown Stops"	2:17
21.	"Finale and End Titles"	1:11

Daleks' Invasion Earth 2150 A.D. (Bill McGuffie)
No.	Title	Length
22.	"Smash and Grab"	1:43
23.	"Tardis Departs"	0:12
24.	"Opening Titles"	1:59
25.	"Tardis"	1:15
26.	"London, 2150 A.D."	0:50
27.	"Daleks and Robomen"	5:01
28.	"Message to Grandfather and the Dalek Saucer Takes Off"	1:26
29.	"The Mine Workings and the Cottage"	1:25
30.	"Preparing the Bomb Capsule"	1:22
31.	"Smash and Grab (Reprise) and End Titles"	2:09

Bonus tracks
No.	Title	Writer(s)	Length
32.	"The Eccentric Doctor Who"	Lockyer	2:25
33.	"Daleks and Thals"	Lockyer	2:09
34.	"Fugue for Thought"	McGuffie	2:16
35.	"Fanfare and Opening Titles" (with effects)	Lockyer	1:48
36.	"Tardis Effects"	Barry Gray	3:06
37.	"Dalek City Effects"	Gray	6:31
