= Annie Hadley =

Costumier for film

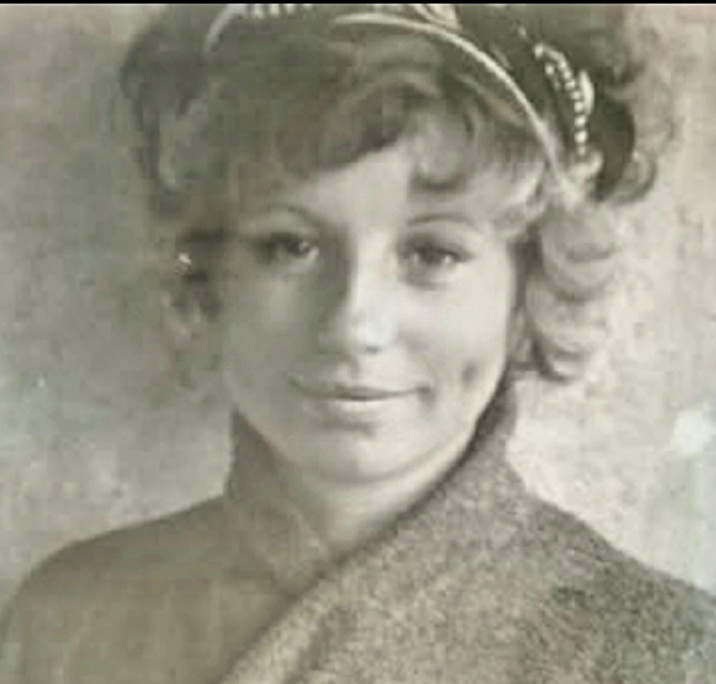
- Born: 1939; Sheffield, England
- Died: 2010 (aged 70–71); England
- Occupations: Costumier, chief cutter
- Notable work: Dangerous Liaisons (1988), Evita (1996), Gangs of New York (2002)
- Spouse: Colin Hadley (married 1958-2010)

Annie Hadley (born Dorothy Ann Brown; 1939–2010) was a costumer for British and Hollywood film and theatre. In her role as chief cutter, Hadley was responsible for tailoring costumes for five films that won Best Costume Academy Awards. Hadley's frequent collaborator, the costume designer Sandy Powell, described Hadley as her "partner in crime".

== Training and early businesses ==
Annie Hadley was born in 1939 in Sheffield, England. Aged sixteen she enrolled at Sheffield School of Art, where she met Colin Hadley. The couple married in 1958, and by 1965 had four daughters.

In 1961 they had moved to Brighton, where Colin was studying at Brighton College of Art, and in 1965 Annie started an haute couture college course, gaining qualifications in pattern cutting and sewing high fashion garments. After graduation, Annie established "Best Bib & Tucker", a childrenswear boutique selling her own designs. After a couple of years, she closed the shop and started Annie Hadley Ready-to-Wear, working from the family home in Lewes Crescent. Then from a factory on King Street, Hadley produced clothes for Warrender, which supplied designer boutiques and department stores including Harrods.

== Career in costume ==
In the late 1970s, Annie Hadley started working as a freelance cutter for theatre and television projects. This role oversees the shaping, build and alternation of costume according to period styles, fitting them to actors, and managing a team of seamstresses to construct garments, often in large quantities.

From 1980, Hadley joined the workroom at Glyndebourne Opera in Sussex, working with the head cutter Tony Ledell. Around 1982, Annie went to Los Angeles to gain experience in Hollywood film costume, and observe studio costume methods. In 1984, she established a workshop on Rock Place in Brighton and employed a team of seamstresses. Projects from this time included the BBC series Blackadder and Blackadder II, to designs by Annie Hardinge.

In 1986, to promote her freelance work in costume, a nude photograph of Annie Hadley holding pinking shears appeared in The Stage newspaper, alongside a profile of her career to date. At the end of December, this article was cited as one of the "amazing events" of the year from the paper's Backstage reporter Flyman.

=== Selected film projects ===
Annie Hadley worked with costume designer James Acheson to make the Samurai warrior and the silver winged suit worn by Jonathon Pryce in the dream sequences on the film Brazil (1985, directed by Terry Gilliam). This was the start of an extensive collaboration, and was followed by Highlander (1986), a time-travelling action movie.

Acheson and Annie Hadley's next collaboration, The Last Emperor, won nine Academy Awards in 1988, including the prize for Best Costume. Reporters at the time noted "the film that swept the Oscars owes much of its colour and spectacle to Brighton costumier Annie Hadley". This epic-scale film set in Imperial China had a tiny costume budget; Hadley and her team had three months to prepare the costumes in her Rock Place workshop, where they pieced together damask tablecloths and embroidered placemats to create the luxurious impression of hand-embroidered silk.

Alongside the huge film productions, Hadley continued to produce costumes for television and theatre. Her projects from the late 1980s included Fat Pig the Musical (1987), and Carrie: The Musical (1988), a notorious flop that faced serious wardrobing problems when gallons of blood soaked the cast every night. More glamorous jobs included supplying showgirl outfits for Ziegfeld Follies and the Royal Variety Show.

Once again working with Acheson on Dangerous Liaisons, an adaptation of the eighteenth century novel and later play Les Liaisons Dangereuses, Hadley and her team had two months to create the structured, elaborate costumes for John Malkovich and Glenn Close. One of Annie Hadley's trainees at the time, Karyn Moriarty, described the "huge amount of work" that went into the "very lavish, colourful costumes". Acheson recalled, "the film was so rushed. We had to start at the end of May and get it out by the end of the year (to qualify for Academy Award consideration)... Dangerous Liaisons was shot in 9 or 10 weeks for $14 million". The costumes in Dangerous Liaisons were central to the film's theme of aristocratic excess, repression, and sensuality, and they have retained their reputation for historical accuracy. Several costumes made by Annie Hadley for the film were displayed in the Art of Character exhibition at Indiana University in 2021.

In 1995, Hadley worked with costume designer Nana Cecchi on First Knight. Hadley made all of Guinevere's dresses at Pinewood Studios, creating a wardrobe that the Los Angeles Times described as "exquisite", singling out "Guinevere’s wedding dress of creamy silk with pearl-embroidered panelled veils and a jewelled floral crown".

Annie Hadley was chief cutter on the film Evita (1996), the first of three films she completed with costume designer Penny Rose. The film starred Madonna, and director Alan Parker stated that "Madonna's wardrobe alone consisted of 85 changes, 39 hats, 45 pairs of shoes and 56 pairs of earrings. Almost all of these were handmade in London" by Annie Hadley and her team. In addition, Madonna announced during filming that she was pregnant, so Hadley needed to adjust costumes to hide the star's growing bump. Hadley and her team produced such an exceptional number of costumes that Madonna achieved a Guinness world record for most costume changes for a single character. The reception of the films' costumes was positive. A New York Times reviewer praised the film's costumes for avoiding "turning the film's star, Madonna, into a caricature," and reported, "Ms. Hadley and Ms. Rose edited artfully and interpreted like crazy." Hadley worked with Penny Rose again on Entrapment (1999), taking on logistical management as Wardrobe Mistress.

In 2000, Annie Hadley worked with designer Janty Yates on Gladiator. During her acceptance speech for the Best Costume Oscar, Yates said, "I couldn't have done it without Rosemary Burrows, Annie Hadley and Sammy Howarth": her costume supervisor, cutter, and assistant designer. Hadley and Yates worked together again on Ridley Scott's Kingdom of Heaven (2005), when Hadley as chief cutter had a team of six principal makers.

=== Collaboration with Sandy Powell ===
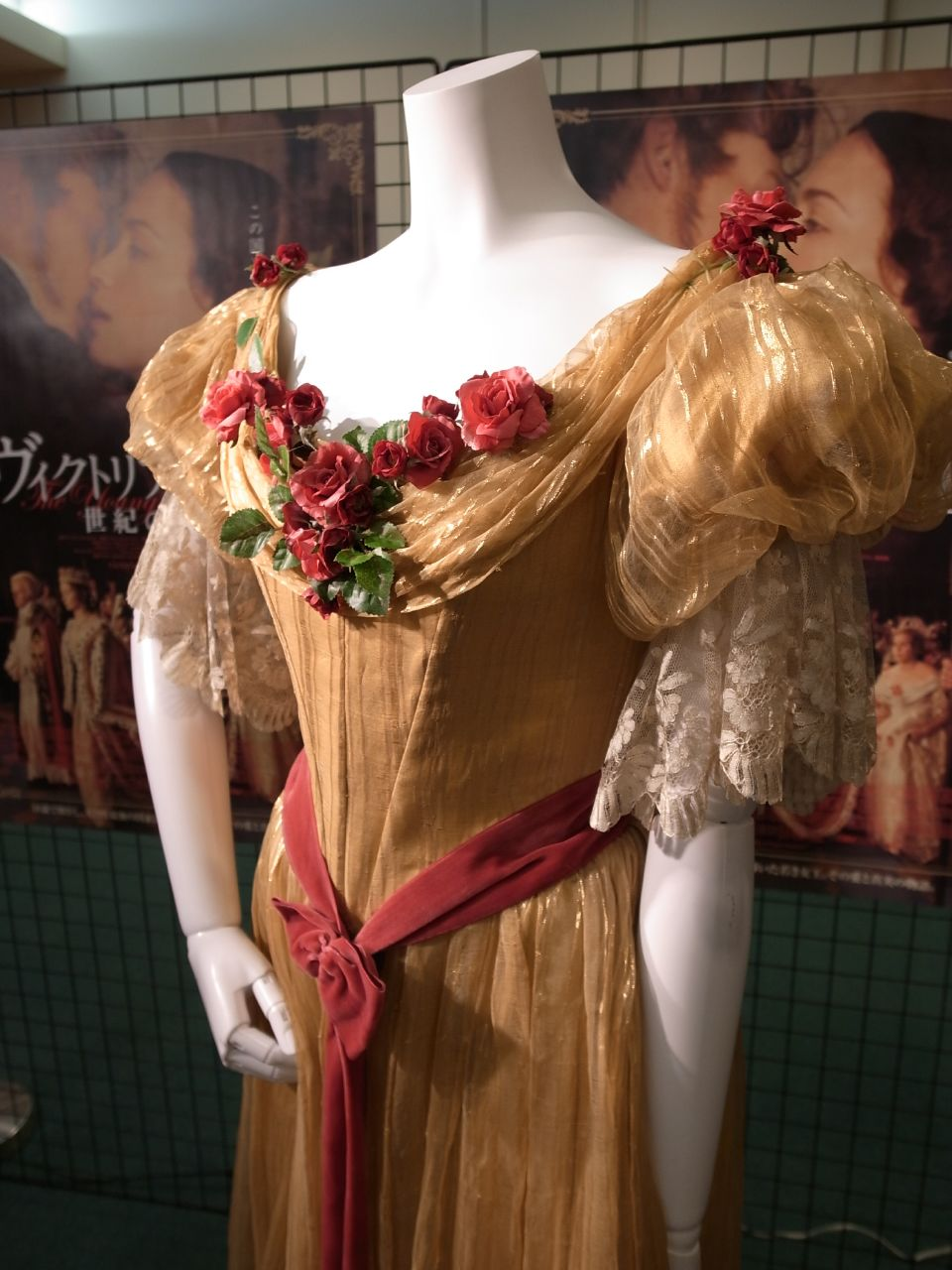
Costume worn by Emily Blunt in The Young Victoria (2009), designed by Sandy Powell, cut by Annie Hadley.

One of Annie's most long-running collaborations was with British costume designer Sandy Powell, which began with Interview with the Vampire (1994, directed by Neil Jordan) and went on to include Shakespeare in Love, The End of the Affair, Gangs of New York, The Aviator, The Other Boleyn Girl and The Young Victoria. For Shakespeare in Love (1998, directed by Jim Madden) Annie Hadley was chief cutter, and her team of seven makers worked from February to May 1998 to make 78 costumes for the main cast, based from a small workshop in Brixton.

Powell, Annie Hadley and cutter Dominic Young also collaborated on Elton John's costume for his 50th birthday party in 1997; this enormous and flamboyant costume cost over $80,000, and attracted attention in the press of the time. The costume's lasting impact was recognised by the V&A Museum, where it was showcased in the Diva exhibition in 2023-24.

Annie Hadley also made Sandy Powell's own outfits for award ceremonies. For the 2004 Academy Awards, Powell collected her Best Costume Design Oscar wearing a replica of a dress worn by Cate Blanchett in The Aviator, made by Annie in a different colour and size. In her acceptance speech, Powell described Hadley as one of her "partners in crime", alongside supervisor Debbie Scott and textile artist John Cowell.

=== Death and tribute ===
Annie Hadley died of cancer in 2010. During her acceptance speech for the BAFTA for costume design, received for The Young Victoria, Sandy Powell said, "I want to dedicate this to the memory of Annie Hadley who cut the costumes for most of my films. The Young Victoria was her last one. Annie is irreplaceable and we will miss her."

== Selected filmography ==
- Brazil (1985)
- The Last Emperor (1987)
- Dangerous Liaisons (1988)
- Hamlet (1990)
- Batman Returns (1992)
- The Last of the Mohicans (1992)
- Little Buddha (1993)
- Interview with the Vampire (1994)
- First Knight (1995)
- Evita (1996)
- In Love and War (1996)
- Elizabeth (1998)
- Shakespeare in Love (1998)
- Entrapment (1999)
- The End of the Affair (1999)
- Titus (1999)
- Gladiator (2000)
- The Importance of Being Earnest (2002)
- Gangs of New York (2002)
- The Aviator (2004)
- Kingdom of Heaven (2005)
- Charlie and the Chocolate Factory (2005)
- Mrs Henderson Presents (2005)
- The Other Boleyn Girl (2008)
- The Young Victoria (2009)
