= Hugh and I Spy =

British TV sitcom (BBC1, 1968)

- Genre: Sitcom
- Written by: John Chapman
- Starring: Terry Scott; Hugh Lloyd
- Country of origin: United Kingdom
- No. of episodes: 6

Production
- Running time: 30 minutes

Original release
- Network: BBC1
- Release: 22 January – 26 February 1968

Hugh and I Spy is a black-and-white British sitcom that was transmitted in 1968. It was the sequel of the long-running Hugh and I. Hugh and I Spy was written by John Chapman and produced by David Croft.

== Cast ==
- Terry Scott – Himself
- Hugh Lloyd – Himself

== Outline ==
The sixth and final series of Hugh and I showed Terry and Hugh on a cruise, Hugh having won £5,000 on the Premium Bonds. In Hugh and I Spy, they have returned but they get unwillingly involved in espionage and double-dealing. Each episode ended in a cliffhanger.

All the episodes were thought to be lost until 2013 when the sixth episode was recovered. (See Wiping).

Hugh and I Spy Episode 6 – "Tea or Coffin" – came from the Patrick Duffy collection. This was sold through the medium of eBay to the highest bidder in March 2013.

== Episodes ==
No.	Title	Written by	Archival Status	Original release date
1	"Yellow Peril"	John Chapman	Missing	22 January 1968
2	"The Heights of Madness"	John Chapman	Missing	29 January 1968
3	"Checkpoint Charlie's"	John Chapman	Missing	5 February 1968
4	"Holy Smoke"	John Chapman	Missing	12 February 1968
5	"Five in a Bed"	John Chapman	Missing	19 February 1968
6	"Tea or Coffin"	John Chapman	Exists	26 February 1968
