= Jill Curzon =

English actress (1938–2026)

- Curzon in the documentary Dalekmania (1995)
- Born: 29 September 1938; United Kingdom
- Died: 19 April 2026 (aged 87); Spain
- Occupation: Actress
- Years active: 1961–1969 • 1995 • 2023
- Known for: Daleks' Invasion Earth 2150 A.D. Hugh and I

Jill Curzon (29 September 1938 – 19 April 2026) was an English actress best known for her film and television appearances in the 1960s.

== Life and career ==
Jill Curzon was born on 29 September 1938. Her television appearances included The Champions (1969), Adam Adamant Lives! (1967), The Saint (1965), Hugh and I and Disneyland (1963). Her film roles include a nurse in 80,000 Suspects (1963), Katharine Banks in Dr. Syn, Alias the Scarecrow (1963), Louise, the niece of Dr. Who (Peter Cushing) in Daleks' Invasion Earth 2150 A.D. (1966), and June in Smokescreen (1964).

Curzon was interviewed about her appearance as Louise in Daleks' Invasion Earth 2150 A.D. in the documentary Dalekmania (1995).

In 2023, she published her autobiography Jill Curzon 2023 A.D. (ISBN 9781915439895).

She died at her home in Spain on 19 April 2026, aged 87.

== Filmography ==
Year	Title	Role	Notes
1962	Out of This World	Bubbles	Episode: "The Tycoons"
1963	80,000 Suspects	Nurse Jill	
1963	Dr. Syn, Alias the Scarecrow	Katharine Banks	
1964	Smokescreen	June	
1965	Not Only... But Also	Actress	1 episode
1962–1965	Hugh and I	Norma Crispin	26 episodes
1965	The Intelligence Men	French Girl	uncredited
1965	Drama 61-67	Vera Lovell	Episode: "Mrs. Quilley's Murder Shoes"
1965	The Saint	Maria Cavallini	Episode: "The Old Treasure Story"
1965	Riviera Police	Jenny	Episode: "Take It Sideways and Pray"
1966	The World of Wooster	Gwladys	Episode: "Jeeves and the Spot of Art"
1966	Daleks' Invasion Earth 2150 A.D.	Louise	
1966	Quick Before They Catch Us	Gloria Smith	4 episodes
1967	Adam Adamant Lives!	Juanita	Episode: "The Deadly Bullet"
1968	The Champions	Stewardess	Episode: "Project Zero"
1969	It Takes a Thief	Miss Garrett	Episode: "The Funeral Is on Mundy"
