= Dr. Who and the Daleks =

1965 British science fiction film by Gordon Flemyng

- Original theatrical banner
- Directed by: Gordon Flemyng
- Screenplay by: Milton Subotsky
- Based on: The Daleks by Terry Nation
- Produced by: Milton Subotsky; Max J. Rosenberg
- Starring: Peter Cushing; Roy Castle; Jennie Linden; Roberta Tovey
- Cinematography: John Wilcox
- Edited by: Oswald Hafenrichter
- Music by: Malcolm Lockyer; Barry Gray (electronic music)
- Production companies: AARU Productions; BBC-TV Productions; Amicus Productions
- Distributed by: Regal Films International
- Release date: 23 August 1965
- Running time: 82 minutes
- Country: United Kingdom
- Language: English
- Budget: £180,000 or £159,054

Dr. Who and the Daleks is a 1965 British science fiction film directed by Gordon Flemyng and written by Milton Subotsky, and the first of two films based on the British science-fiction television series Doctor Who. It stars Peter Cushing as Dr. Who, Roberta Tovey as Susan, Jennie Linden as Barbara, and Roy Castle as Ian. It was followed by Daleks' Invasion Earth 2150 A.D. (1966). The films were released amidst the "Dalekmania" craze in the 1960s.

The story is based on the Doctor Who television serial The Daleks, produced by the BBC. Filmed in Technicolor, it is the first Doctor Who story to be made in colour and in a widescreen format. The film was not intended to form part of the ongoing story-lines of the television series. Elements from the programme are used, however, such as various characters, the Daleks and a police box time machine, albeit in re-imagined forms.

== Plot ==
Dr. Who, his granddaughters Susan and Barbara, and Barbara's boyfriend Ian are accidentally transported to another planet by Dr. Who's latest invention, a time and space machine called Tardis.

While exploring, the travellers see a city in the distance. They also find a small container of drugs which they take aboard Tardis. Wishing to investigate further, Dr. Who fakes a leak in a fluid link, a vital component of Tardis, to ensure that the group will go to the city to search for the mercury supposedly needed to refill the component. Once in the city, they are captured by cyborg creatures which refer to themselves as "Daleks", who seize the fluid link for examination. Dr. Who then realises that the group have contracted radiation sickness, and that the drugs which they discovered earlier may be their only hope of survival.

While covertly observing the captives, the Daleks discuss their own plight. They are trapped inside their metal casings, and within the city, by the radiation. They wish to leave so that they can destroy all other life and claim the planet for themselves. Hearing the captives discussing the drugs, the Daleks make a proposal to them. If the humans bring the drugs they found to them, they will allow them enough to treat themselves. Susan goes, being the only one still strong enough to undertake the task.

Reaching Tardis, Susan collects the drugs and then encounters Alydon, leader of the Thals, a species that fought the Daleks in an atomic war centuries previously. Alydon gives Susan a second container of anti-radiation drugs to use if the Daleks break their promise.

When Susan returns, the Daleks discover the second drug supply, but allow the humans to treat themselves with it. Susan explains to the others that, according to Alydon, the Thal crops have failed and they have come to the Dalek city, hoping to trade the anti-radiation drug formula for food. Again overhearing this conversation, the Daleks decide that they no longer need the Thals now that they have a sample of the drug. They get Susan to write a letter which they will leave for the Thals, stating that they will provide food, to be collected from the city, as an act of friendship. When Susan finishes the letter, the Daleks reveal that they plan to kill all of the Thals when they arrive.

When a Dalek enters their cell, the travellers manage to disable it. Once free, they are able to warn the Thals who are entering the city, and escape with them into the jungle. The Daleks then test the Thal anti-radiation drug but find that it causes disastrous side effects. Thwarted, they decide to detonate a neutron bomb to increase the planet's radiation to a level which even the Thals cannot survive.

Back at the Thal camp, Dr. Who realises that the travellers are trapped on the planet as the Daleks still have the fluid link, and he will need the Thals' help to recover it. He urges Alydon to fight the Daleks to save his species but he refuses, insisting that the Thals are now peaceful. In response, Dr. Who pretends to order Ian to take a Thal woman to the Daleks in exchange for the confiscated component. Horrified, Alydon attacks Ian, then realises that the Thals can fight for things they care about. Alydon, Dr. Who and Susan then lead the Thals in an attack on the city, but the Daleks repel the assault; in the commotion, Dr. Who and Susan are recaptured.

Meanwhile, Ian, Barbara and a small group of Thals infiltrate the Dalek city from the rear. Once inside, they join the rest of the Thals, who have mounted a frontal assault to rescue Dr. Who and Susan. The Thals and humans enter the control room, where the Daleks have started the bomb countdown. During the ensuing struggle the Daleks inadvertently destroy their main control console, which kills them by cutting their power and stops the bomb detonation.

Back in the jungle, with the fluid link recovered, the travellers depart in Tardis to return home, with some Thal capes as presents.

== Cast ==
- Peter Cushing as Dr. Who
- Roy Castle as Ian
- Jennie Linden as Barbara
- Roberta Tovey as Susan
- Barrie Ingham as Alydon
- Michael Coles as Ganatus
- Yvonne Antrobus as Dyoni
- Geoffrey Toone as Temmosus
- John Bown as Antodus
- Mark Petersen as Elyon
- Ken Garady, Nicholas Head, Michael Lennox, Jack Waters, Virginia Tyler, Jane Lumb, Bruce Wells, Martin Grace, Sharon Young, Gary Wyler as the Thals (uncredited)
- Michelle Scott as Thal Child (uncredited)
- Bruno Castagnoli, Michael Dillon, Brian Hands, Robert Jewell, Kevin Manser, Eric McKay, Len Saunders, Gerald Taylor – Dalek operators
- David Graham, Peter Hawkins – Dalek voices (uncredited)

== Production ==
Amicus bought an option to make the story and two sequels from Terry Nation and the BBC for £500. Principal photography commenced at Shepperton Studios, England in April 1965 and took six weeks. The film was produced on a budget of £180,000, or about £3.05 million in 2025.

Eight Dalek props were built at a cost of £350 each. The Daleks were redesigned slightly for the film. They had larger base sections and dome lights than the TV Daleks of the time, making them more imposing, and some were fitted with a two-jawed mechanical claw instead of a plunger. They also had more colourful paint schemes, with two Dalek leaders being painted respectively in black and red. Originally, the Daleks were to be armed with flamethrowers, but these were vetoed on health and safety grounds and because they were considered too frightening for a young audience. Instead, the guns produced jets of CO_{2} gas from internally mounted fire extinguishers. The actor Barrie Ingham discussed the production in an interview in Australia in 1976 for the Doctor Who fanzine Zerinza.

In 1995, a documentary about the two Dalek films, Dalekmania, was released on video. It revealed details about the productions, spin-offs, and publicity campaigns. It was later included as an extra in many of the home media video releases of the two Dalek films.

Although the planet on which the action takes place is not named in the film, it is retroactively identified as Skaro in the sequel, matching the name given in the television series.

== Release ==
The film premiered in London on 23 August 1965. The film was the twentieth biggest British box office moneymaker in 1965. It did not perform as well in the US, however, where the Doctor Who television series and the Daleks were relatively unknown.

== Marketing ==
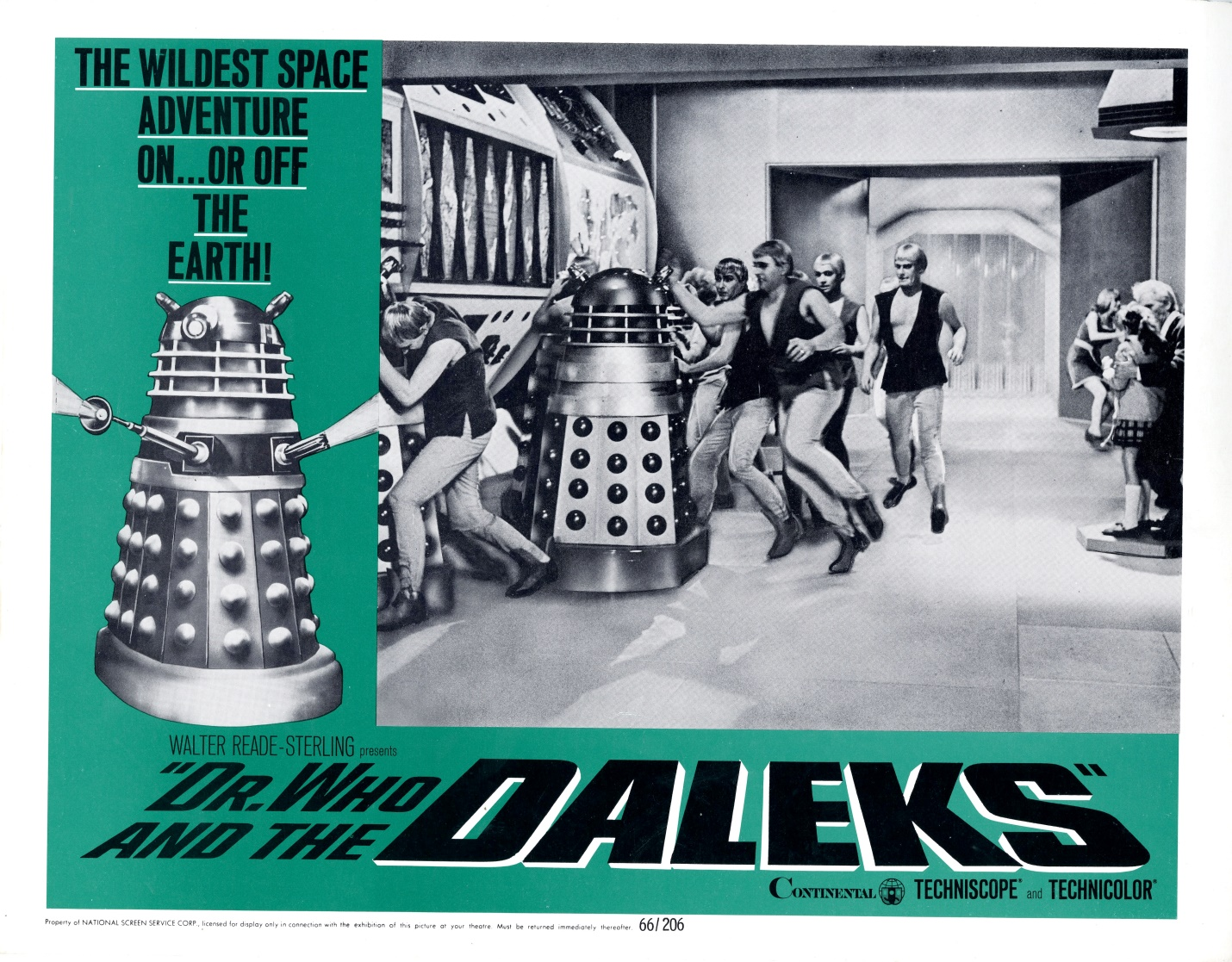
Promotional lobby card released in the United States

As part of the promotional campaign, a number of Daleks were displayed at the 1965 Cannes film festival. Single Daleks were also sent further afield, one making an appearance at a cinema in Sydney, Australia. Souvenir Press published a tie-in colouring book for children in 1965, with colour photographic illustrations from the film on both the front and rear covers.

== Critical response ==
Halliwell's Film Guide described the film as "limply put together, and only for indulgent children". John Clute, in the book Science Fiction: The Illustrated Encyclopedia, gives the film one star out of three, stating: "Many people would like to see the [Doctor Who] television series back; few mourn the long-gone films". Radio Times was more favourable, awarding the film three stars out of five, commenting: "this spin-off lacks the bite and inventiveness that set the landmark series apart, unwisely injecting humour into the sparse scenario, and the cheap art direction is strictly '101 Uses for Pink Plastic Sheeting'. However, despite the many faults, it's still a fun ride for both the uninitiated and die-hard fans alike".

In The Guardian in 2013, Stuart Heritage stated: "Cushing does his best, but he's not exactly given a lot to work with." He described the Daleks as "so pointlessly toothless here" and also criticised the "incredibly tedious" amount of Dalek dialogue to explain their motives, the portrayal of the Thals, and Roy Castle's performance, saying "to call him hammy would be to provide the greatest disservice to pigs." Andrew Nette of the British Film Institute stated the film was "widely derided by many fans and critics", adding it is "certainly an uneven affair. Some scenes [...] still have the capacity to thrill. Others, like the final victory over the Daleks, feel rushed and flat. The Doctor's granddaughters are largely one-dimensional... The aspect of the movie that most antagonises purists is Cushing's Doctor." Nette described the film as having a "wonderfully pulpy sci-fi atmosphere", saying: "The highlight of the movie is its look... Many of the sets [...] are impressive" and "the movie Daleks are more impressive than their small screen counterparts".

According to the BFI, the Cushing films "are often forgotten in the Doctor Who pantheon". Similarly, Stuart Heritage commented in The Guardian in 2013 that "people don't talk about Dr Who and the Daleks any more". In 1975, actor Tom Baker, who was playing the Fourth Doctor in the television series, commented on the flaws of the film and its sequel while discussing another proposed Doctor Who film, saying "There have been two Doctor Who films in the past, both rather poor... There are many dangers in transporting a television series onto the big screen.. a lot of things that you could get away with on the small screen wouldn't wash in the cinema."

== Home media ==
Super 8 film

- Released in the UK by Walton Sound and Film Services in 1977.

VHS

- Released in the UK by Thorn EMI in 1982 and by Warner Home Video in 1988 and 1996.
- Released in the US by Thorn EMI in 1985, by GoodTimes Home Video in 1989 and by Lumiere in 1994.
- Released in Australia Thorn EMI in 1983 and by Universal in 1990.

Betamax

- Released in the UK by Thorn EMI in 1982.
- Released in Australia Thorn EMI in 1983.

DVD

- Both films, plus the Dalekmania documentary, released in the US by Anchor Bay Entertainment as a boxset in 2001 and by Lionsgate as a two-disc set in 2012.
- Both films, plus the Dalekmania documentary, released in Australia by StudioCanal as a two-disc boxset in 2001.
- Both films, plus the Dalekmania documentary, released in the UK by StudioCanal as a two-disc boxset in 2002 and 2006.

Blu-ray

- The film, plus the Dalekmania documentary, released in the UK by StudioCanal in 2013.
- Both films, released in the UK by StudioCanal as a two-disc box set in 2013.
- Released in the UK by StudioCanal as a Zavvi exclusive 'SteelBook' limited edition in 2015.
- The film, plus the Dalekmania documentary, released in the US by Kino Lorber in 2020.
- A restored and remastered version released on 4K UHD disc by StudioCanal, in both Limited Edition and standard Steelbook formats in 2022.

== Soundtrack ==
Dr. Who & the Daleks

Soundtrack album by Malcolm Lockyer, Bill McGuffie, Barry Gray
- Released: 5 October 2009
- Genre: Soundtrack
- Label: Silva Screen Records
- Producer: Mark Ayres

Music from both Dr. Who and the Daleks and Daleks' Invasion Earth 2150 A.D. was released by Silva Screen Records on a CD entitled Dr. Who & the Daleks in 2009 and on a limited edition double vinyl LP in 2016. Selected tracks from both films were released by Silva Screen Records as a limited edition 7-inch EP in 2011. Music from the film was released on an LP by StudioCanal in 2022 as part of a package also including 4K UHD and Blu-ray discs of the film.

=== Track listing ===
Dr. Who and the Daleks (Malcolm Lockyer)
No.	Title	Length
1.	"Fanfare and Opening Titles"	1:48
2.	"Tardis"	0:48
3.	"The Petrified Jungle"	1:58
4.	"The Petrified Creature and the City"	0:52
5.	"Four Return To Tardis"	1:05
6.	"The Medicine Box and the Climb to the City"	2:24
7.	"City Corridors"	1:54
8.	"Captured by the Daleks"	1:18
9.	"Susan Leaves the City"	1:17
10.	"The Jungle at Night"	2:13
11.	"Susan Returns to the City"	1:12
12.	"Escape from the Cell"	3:05
13.	"The Trap"	3:44
14.	"The Swamp"	2:37
15.	"The Mountain"	2:34
16.	"The Cave"	1:57
17.	"The Jump"	0:54
18.	"The Thals Approach the City"	1:40
19.	"The Countdown"	2:38
20.	"The Countdown Stops"	2:17
21.	"Finale and End Titles"	1:11

Daleks' Invasion Earth 2150 A.D. (Bill McGuffie)
No.	Title	Length
22.	"Smash and Grab"	1:43
23.	"Tardis Departs"	0:12
24.	"Opening Titles"	1:59
25.	"Tardis"	1:15
26.	"London, 2150 A.D."	0:50
27.	"Daleks and Robomen"	5:01
28.	"Message to Grandfather and the Dalek Saucer Takes Off"	1:26
29.	"The Mine Workings and the Cottage"	1:25
30.	"Preparing the Bomb Capsule"	1:22
31.	"Smash and Grab (Reprise) and End Titles"	2:09

Bonus tracks
No.	Title	Writer(s)	Length
32.	"The Eccentric Doctor Who"	Lockyer	2:25
33.	"Daleks and Thals"	Lockyer	2:09
34.	"Fugue for Thought"	McGuffie	2:16
35.	"Fanfare and Opening Titles" (with effects)	Lockyer	1:48
36.	"Tardis Effects"	Barry Gray	3:06
37.	"Dalek City Effects"	Gray	6:31

== Dr. Who & the Daleks: The Official Story of the Films ==
Dr Who and the Daleks: The Official Story of the Films
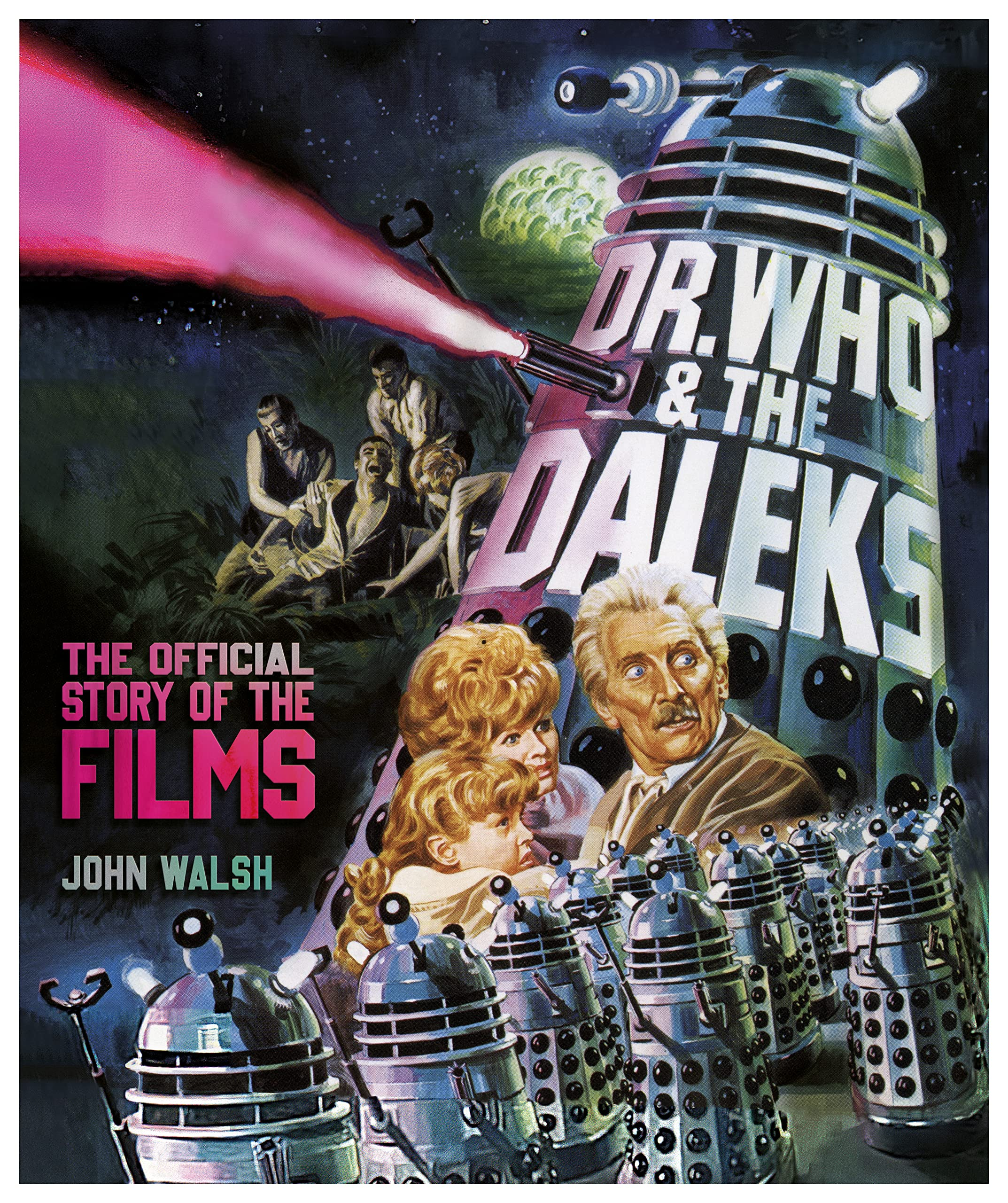
- Author: John Walsh
- Language: English
- Genre: Science fiction film
- Publisher: Titan Books
- Publication date: December 5, 2022
- Publication place: United Kingdom
- Media type: Print (hardcover)
- Pages: 160
- ISBN: 978-1-80336-018-8

Dr. Who & the Daleks: The Official Story of the Films is a book by John Walsh. It is a behind-the-scenes look at the making of the films Dr. Who and the Daleks and Daleks' Invasion Earth 2150 A.D. The large format coffee table style book tells the story of how the original television series Doctor Who was adapted twice for cinema audiences.

The book includes previously unpublished images and images which had long been out of circulation. It also contains interviews conducted for the book, and previously published commentary by people no longer alive such as star Peter Cushing, co-stars Roy Castle and Barrie Ingham, and writer Terry Nation, together with various film crew members. In an interview with the author, Forbidden Planet TV's Andrew Sumner commented on the complexities of the book's production and publication.

The book received an 'Honourable Mention' in the 2023 Rondo Hatton Classic Horror Awards.
