= Hugh and I =

British TV sitcom (1962–1967)

- Genre: Sitcom
- Written by: John T. Chapman
- Starring: Terry Scott; Hugh Lloyd; Vi Stevens; Wallas Eaton; Mollie Sugden; Cyril Smith; Jack Haig; Patricia Hayes
- Music by: Wally Stott
- Country of origin: United Kingdom
- Original language: English
- No. of series: 6
- No. of episodes: 68 + 2 shorts (39 missing)

Production
- Running time: 40x25 minutes 31x30 minutes

Original release
- Network: BBC TV
- Release: 17 July 1962 – 17 January 1967

Hugh and I is a black-and-white British sitcom that aired from 1962 to 1967. It starred Terry Scott and Hugh Lloyd as two friends who shared lodgings with Terry's mother and was followed by a sequel called Hugh and I Spy. The two actors had previously worked together on stage for many years.

Hugh and I was written by John T. Chapman with additional material from John Junkin. Music was by Wally Stott. The first five series were produced by David Croft. 68 episodes were produced over 6 series, as well as two short special episodes as part of the BBC's Christmas Night with the Stars programme in 1963 and 1964 respectively.

== Cast ==
- Terry Scott as Himself
- Hugh Lloyd as Himself
- Vi Stevens as Mrs Ada Scott (series 1 to 5; 45 episodes)
- Jill Curzon (series 1 and 2, series 4; 26 episodes), Jacqueline Wallis (series 3; 7 episodes) and Wendy Richard (series 5; 4 episodes) as Norma Crispin
- Mollie Sugden as Ethel Crispin (series 1 to 5; 33 episodes)
- Patricia Hayes as Griselda Wormold (series 1 to 5; 30 episodes)
- Jack Haig as Cecil Wormold (series 2 to 5; 24 episodes)
- Wallas Eaton as Arthur Crispin (series 1 and 2; 18 episodes)
- Cyril Smith as Arthur Wormold (series 1; 8 episodes)
- Patsy Smart as Miss Jenks (series 1, series 3 and 4, series 6; 4 episodes)
- Pat Coombs as Cynthia (series 2, series 4 to 6; 4 episodes)

== Plot ==
Terry Scott is a lovable rogue who wants to achieve wealth without working. The cunning Terry lives with his mother at 33, Lobelia Avenue in Tooting, South London. They have a gullible and dull-witted lodger, Hugh Lloyd, who works at a local aircraft factory. The two often try to make money through one of Scott's get-rich-quick schemes. Their next door neighbours, the Crispins and the Wormolds, also make frequent appearances. Mr Crispin is a thug who thinks violence will solve a problem, Mrs Crispin is a snob and their daughter Norma is constantly being stalked by men. On the other side, the Wormolds are an old couple; Harold is very clumsy. In the last episode of the fifth series, Hugh won £5,000 on the Premium Bonds and the following series showed the two of them undertaking a world cruise. The neighbours and mother had left the show.

== Archive Status ==
Only 29 episodes are thought to survive: (see wiping).

In November 2016, an episode of the sixth series (S6 Ep3 'Beau Jesters') was returned after many years believed lost. In July 2017 the episode 'The Girl on the Poster' was returned by BBC South producer and presenter Richard Latto. In December 2021 two episodes of the fifth series (S5 Ep9 'It's In The Stars' and S5 Ep10 'Huntin' Shootin' and Fishin') were recovered by Kaleidoscope, having been purchased from a private collector on eBay.

On 20 October 2023, the first episode of the third series, 'New Year Resolutions' was discovered and announced at the Film is Fabulous event.

== Episodes ==
All episodes from the first, fifth and sixth series were 30 minutes, while episodes from the other series were 25 minutes long. The surviving 25/30-minute episodes are indicated by their archive status, as are the two Christmas Night With the Stars specials.

=== Series 1 (1962) ===
No. overall	No. in series	Title	Archival Status	Original release date
1	1	"Fully Incomprehensive"	Exists	17 July 1962
Terry thinks there is money to be made from an insurance agency. After visiting a real agency to see what goes on, Terry starts off in business. He fails to sell a policy to both sets of neighbours, but the man he does sell a policy to is injured when Terry's sign falls on him, so is able to make a claim. Also features Patricia Hayes as Griselda Wormwold, and Cyril Smith as Cecil Wormwold.
2	2	"A Brace of Pheasants"	Exists	24 July 1962
It's their annual holiday and Hugh was looking forwards to Mrs Crabthorne's guest house at Brighton as usual but Terry has booked them grouse hunting in Scotland. Getting up at 5am and wandering around on cold moors quickly loses its appeal, and it doesn't help that there are army manoeuvres there, so they head south to Brighton. Also features Deryck Guyler as a ticket inspector, Fred Emney as Lord Popham, Judith Furse as his wife, Lady Popham, Frank Williams as an army officer, and John Junkin as a soldier.
3	3	"Here Comes the Bride"	Exists	31 July 1962
Hugh is smitten for the girl next door, Norma Crispin. Terry disapproves of his antics and secretly signs him up to a marriage bureau. Also features Jill Curzon as Norma Crispin, Wallas Eaton as Arthur Crispin, Mollie Sugden as Ethel Crispin and Irene Handl as Miss Willow.
4	4	"A Royal Visit"	Exists	7 August 1962
A royal visit is taking place in Tooting, and 33 Lobelia Avenue has been chosen as the destination to host the royal party for afternoon tea. Hugh and Terry prepare for the visit, whilst their neighbours, the Crispins try to get involved.
5	5	"A Fete Worse Than Death"	Exists	14 August 1962
The last Church Fete was a disaster so Terry takes charge as usual and decides on a Pageant of History, with the cast portraying all the important events from 1066 onwards. But everything goes wrong including heavy rain on the day. Also features Julian Orchard as Mr Spinks and Charles Lloyd-Pack as the vicar.
6	6	"Hugh's Belated Birthday"	Missing	21 August 1962
Hugh is dismayed that his birthday has been overlooked. So Terry and Mum decide to organise a belated birthday party for him.
7	7	"It's a Dog's Life"	Exists	28 August 1962
There's tension in the household when Hugh is offered a Whippet puppy by the Crispins, but Terry disallows this. Secretly, Hugh goes behind Terry's back and brings the puppy home.
8	8	"Putting on the Ritz"	Exists	4 September 1962
Terry is finally thinking about getting a job and decides to be a rich American's aide. Thanks to his mother, they meet him at the very expensive Ritz restaurant where he and Hugh upset the posh air of the place. They end up with a bill of £47 10s (£47.50), and all Terry has is Hugh's £14 10s, so they end up working for the restaurant to pay the rest off. Also features Fred Emney as a Lord and Jeremy Hawk as the head waiter.
9	9	"Love Thy Neighbour"	Exists	11 September 1962
The Crispins buy a car, and as they cannot park it outside their own house, park it outside the Scotts' house. It is very noisy and smoke comes into the living room every time it is started, so Terry decides they should paint a white line at 2am to stop it being parked there. A policeman catches them, and they are fined £5 each. Terry then decides that Hugh should buy a car. It's an old banger, but too late they realise that neither of them can drive.

=== Series 2 (1963) ===
No. overall	No. in series	Title	Archival Status	Original release date
10	1	"Lost Property"	Exists	21 May 1963
After Hugh gets ejected from a bus and his luggage thrown at him. He finds that he's mistakenly been given a attaché case marked 'C.E.W.', with £1000 worth of notes inside. Hugh decides to track down the owner and claim his reward. Also features Jack Haig as Cecil Wormwold, who took over the role from Cyril Smith, whom passed away earlier that year.
11	2	"Trad Fad Lloyd"	Exists	28 May 1963
Hugh finds out that Norma shares his admiration for Jazz music. One evening whilst Terry and his mother are away at a dinner party over at the Wormwolds, he invites Norma's Jazz group, the Tooting Trad Type over, so they can practise in the living room.
12	3	"Wedding Bells"	Exists	4 June 1963
It's the day of Terry's cousin Ivy's wedding, and he has been volunteered by her mother Mavis to host the wedding reception, without letting him know in advance. Chaos soon abounds when Ivy rekindles her former adoration for Hugh. Also features Sheila Steafel as Ivy.
13	4	"April in Paris"	Exists	11 June 1963
When Hugh's planned holiday to the countryside is scuppered. Terry takes him to the airport, where they head off to Paris for a weekend trip.
14	5	"The Prison Visitor"	Exists	18 June 1963
Terry decides to become a prison visitor to reform convicts. His first try is a hard man (Kenneth J. Warren) who he manages to upset. When that convict escapes a few weeks later, he comes to Terry's house armed with a gun and takes them all hostage. Husband Harold Wormold has vanished from the series and brother-in-law Cecil has taken his place with Haig looking like his "LeClerc" role in 'Allo 'Allo!, twenty years later.
15	6	"The 19th Hole"	Exists	25 June 1963
Terry discovers that the Crispins have been allowed to join his local Bowls club, so he decides to take up Golf instead.
16	7	"A Turn For the Nurse"	Exists	2 July 1963
Terry's mother is severely ill with lumbago. There's confusion about when the Doctor arrives, and multiple meals arrive all at once, while Terry and Hugh become smitten for the district Nurse. Also features Derek Nimmo as Doctor.
17	8	"Where There's a Will"	Exists	9 July 1963
Aunt Maude, a long lost relative of Terry of whom he's never heard of before, travels from her home in Australia to pay him and Mrs Scott a visit, and it is discovered that she is quite wealthy.
18	9	"A Sink of Iniquity"	Exists	16 July 1963
Terry tries to mend a fuse at the Crispins' house and puts his foot through the sink. Ethel Crispin suggests they should get "Slocombe's" (Mollie Sugden, who played Ethel, would later play Mrs Slocombe in Are You Being Served?) to put in a new one; but as they charge £10, Terry decides he and Hugh should do it. This leads to the new sink being put on a removals lorry going to Leeds, and Hugh fusing the electricity in a number of houses and making a hole in a water pipe. Also features Deryck Guyler as a police sergeant.
19	10	"Holding the Baby"	Exists	23 July 1963
Terry and Hugh are tasked with looking after a baby for the day. Trouble is, they haven't a clue how to look after it.
20	11	"The Root of All Evil"	Exists	30 July 1963
When Hugh is suffering from a terrible toothache, the entire household and neighbours rally round him for assistance. Despite Hugh's protestations about going to the dentist, Terry is determined to drag him to the dentist's chair.
21	12	"A Place in the Sun"	Exists	6 August 1963
Hugh, Terry and his mother are bickering on where to go on holiday. Hugh prefers to go the same guest house they go to every year, whilst Terry is eager to broaden his horizons and go somewhere different for a change.

=== Christmas Special (1963) ===
No. overall	No. in series	Title	Archival Status	Original release date
0	1	"Christmas Night with the Stars - Insert"	Missing	25 December 1963
A short specially shot insert as part of that year's Christmas Night with the Stars.

=== Series 3 (1964) ===
No. overall	No. in series	Title	Archival Status	Original release date
22	1	"New Year's Resolutions"	Exists	4 January 1964
Terry ushers in the New Year with a raft of resolutions, his overbearing actions force an unwitting Hugh to do likewise. Terry decides to help more around the house, whilst Hugh resolves to give up smoking. Terry decides to stop smoking as well, and the two engage in a battle of wills, who'll succeed and who'll fail.
23	2	"Pen Friends"	Missing	11 January 1964
24	3	"Coal Comfort"	Missing	22 February 1964
Synopsis currently unavailable. Note: This episode was originally supposed to follow the episode 'Emergency Ward', but due to the postponement of the series, this was transmitted first.
25	4	"Emergency Ward"	Missing	7 March 1964
Synopsis currently unavailable. Note: This episode was initially scheduled to air on the 18/1/1964 but was postponed. Subsequently it transmitted after 'Coal Comfort' which was originally scheduled to be shown following this episode.
26	5	"Wheel of Fortune"	Missing	14 March 1964
27	6	"Central Cheating"	Missing	21 March 1964
28	7	"Escort Duty"	Exists	28 March 1964
Terry is so desperate to see a championship fight where seats are twenty five guineas (£26.25p) each that he decides to get a job. He and Hugh join an escort agency and get a job looking after two Italian women. However he ends up at the opera while Hugh who can't stand boxing ends up at the fight.
29	8	"Door to Door"	Missing	10 April 1964
30	9	"The Girl in the Poster"	Exists	17 April 1964
Synopsis currently unavailable, this episode was recovered in July 2017 by BBC South producer and presenter Richard Latto.
31	10	"A Fat Chance of Slimming"	Missing	24 April 1964
32	11	"The Day of Reckoning"	Missing	1 May 1964
33	12	"In the Dog House"	Missing	8 May 1964
34	13	"A Chain Reaction"	Missing	15 May 1964

=== Christmas Special (1964) ===
No. overall	No. in series	Title	Archival Status	Original release date
0	1	"Christmas Night with the Stars - Insert"	Exists	25 December 1964
A short specially shot insert as part of that year's Christmas Night with the Stars. It's Christmas Day, Hugh, Terry and his mother have the Wormwolds and the Crispins over for Christmas lunch. Terry intends on playing Charades, but confusion among the guests continuously scuppers his efforts.

=== Series 4 (1965) ===
No. overall	No. in series	Title	Archival Status	Original release date
35	1	"Mum's Suitor"	Missing	3 January 1965
Synopsis currently unavailable. Also features John Laurie as The Suitor.
36	2	"The Old Folks at Home"	Missing	10 January 1965
37	3	"Terry Mason"	Missing	17 January 1965
Terry turns detective, and models himself after TV sleuth Perry Mason.
38	4	"The Critics"	Missing	7 February 1965
Synopsis currently unavailable. Note: It was initially scheduled to air on the 24/1/1965 but it was postponed.
39	5	"The White Man's Grave"	Missing	14 February 1965
40	6	"On the Ball"	Missing	21 February 1965
41	7	"Going, Going, Gone!"	Missing	28 January 1965
42	8	"No Business, Like Snow Business"	Missing	7 March 1965
43	9	"A Bird in the Nest"	Missing	14 March 1965
44	10	"The Choir"	Missing	21 March 1965
45	11	"Horses For Courses"	Missing	28 March 1965
46	12	"The Suit"	Missing	4 April 1965
47	13	"Bun Fight"	Missing	11 April 1965

=== Series 5 (1966) ===
No. overall	No. in series	Title	Archival Status	Original release date
48	1	"Night Life"	Missing	3 January 1966
49	2	"Pot Luck"	Missing	10 January 1966
50	3	"It Never Rains"	Exists	17 January 1966
51	4	"Goodbye Dolly"	Missing	24 January 1966
Synopsis currently unavailable. Also features Margaret Nolan as Dolly.
52	5	"The Gasman Cometh"	Missing	31 January 1966
53	6	"Ministering Angel"	Missing	7 February 1966
54	7	"With a Pinch of Salt"	Missing	14 February 1966
55	8	"Costume Piece"	Missing	21 February 1966
56	9	"It's in the Stars"	Exists	28 February 1966
Synopsis currently unavailable, this episode was recovered by Kaleidoscope in December 2021.
57	10	"Huntin', Shootin' and Fishin'"	Exists	7 March 1966
Synopsis currently unavailable, this episode was recovered by Kaleidoscope in December 2021. Also features Wendy Richard as Norma Crispin.
58	11	"Tooting Footlights"	Missing	14 March 1966
59	12	"The Christening"	Missing	21 March 1966
60	13	"The Jackpot"	Missing	28 March 1966
Hugh hits the jackpot when he wins £5000 worth in premium bonds.

=== Series 6 (1966-7) ===
No. overall	No. in series	Title	Archival Status	Original release date
61	1	"Troubled Waters"	Missing	29 November 1966
After cashing in on their winnings, Hugh and Terry embark on the first leg of their round the world cruise. This series follows a continuous eight part story arc.
62	2	"Morocco Bound"	Missing	6 December 1966
63	3	"Beau Jesters"	Exists	13 December 1966
Hugh and Terry find themselves stranded in Tangiers and accidentally enlist in the French Foreign Legion, as they seek a way to travel down to Suez in order to rejoin their ship. Note: This episode was recovered by Kaleidoscope in 2016.
64	4	"Arabian Knights"	Missing	20 December 1966
65	5	"Hold That Tiger"	Missing	27 December 1966
66	6	"Chinese Crackers"	Exists	3 January 1967
67	7	"A Touch of the Rising Sun"	Missing	10 January 1967
68	8	"Adios Amigos"	Missing	17 January 1967

== Radio ==
A single episode of Hugh and I was adapted for radio by the BBC and was broadcast on 13 June 1963.

== DVD release ==
21 (of the 28) surviving episodes of the series, were released on DVD by Renown Films on 7 September 2015, currently excluding the most recently rediscovered (S6 Ep 3 'Beau Jesters', S3 Ep 9 'The Girl on the Poster', S5 Ep 9 'It's in the Stars', S5 Ep 10 'Huntin', Shootin' and Fishin & S3 Ep 1 'New Year Resolutions').
