= Malcolm Lockyer =

British film composer and conductor (1923–1976)

Malcolm Neville Lockyer (5 October 1923 – 28 June 1976) was a British film composer and conductor.

== Biography ==
Lockyer was born in Greenwich, London, England. In his early years he developed an interest in dance and from here gathered an interest in music. At the age of nineteen he became a musician in the Royal Air Force and in 1944 joined the Buddy Featherstonhaugh Sextet. His biggest successes in composition were for the BBC series' Friends and Neighbours (1954) and The Pursuers (1961), for which he wrote the themes.

He scored several films for Harry Alan Towers, such as Sandy the Seal (1965), Our Man in Marrakesh (1966), Five Golden Dragons (1967) and The Vengeance of Fu Manchu (1967). His other film scores include The Pleasure Girls (1965), Island of Terror (1966), Deadlier than the Male (1967) and Night of the Big Heat (1967). He also composed the music for the 1965 film Dr. Who and the Daleks (1965); some arrangements from that film have since been released on a CD called The Eccentric Dr. Who.

One of the highlights of Lockyer's career was arranging and conducting the Bing Crosby album Holiday in Europe (1961), described as "one of the all-time Crosby classics" by the jazz critic Will Friedwald in his liner notes to the CD Bing Crosby: Legends of the 20th Century, which includes seven tracks from the album.

Lockyer conducted frequently throughout the 1960s. Among the many orchestras he led were those for: the BBC Radio Home Service's radio musical version of Jerome K. Jerome's Three Men in a Boat (1962). He was conductor of the BBC Revue Orchestra and subsequently the principal conductor of the new BBC Radio Orchestra and the BBC Big Band when both ensembles were formed in 1967.

Lockyer was the musical director for the 1972 Eurovision Song Contest staged at the Usher Hall in Edinburgh. Unusually however, as noted in John Kennedy O'Connor's The Eurovision Song Contest - The Official History, he did not conduct the home entry for the UK (it was conducted by David Mackay instead). Lockyer had taken part in the first UK selection process to find Britain's debut Eurovision entry in 1957. He performed an orchestral version of the song "All", which won the contest. However, Patricia Bredin went on to perform the song at the final in Frankfurt with musical direction by Eric Robinson.

Shortly before his death in 1976, he conducted The Million Airs Orchestra in 26 Glenn Miller tribute concerts.

== Selected filmography ==
- Strictly Confidential (1959)
- Operation Cupid (1960)
- Sandy the Seal (shot in 1965, released in 1969)
- Dr. Who and the Daleks (1965)
- Ten Little Indians (1965)
- The Pleasure Girls (1965)
- Our Man in Marrakesh (1966)
- Secrets of a Windmill Girl (1966)
- Island of Terror (1966)
- The Vengeance of Fu Manchu (1967)
- Five Golden Dragons (1967)
- Deadlier than the Male (1967)
- Night of the Big Heat (1967)
- The Long Day's Dying (1968)
- Eve (1968)

Preceded by (Republic of Ireland) Colman Pearce	Eurovision Song Contest conductor 1972	Succeeded by (Luxembourg) Pierre Cao
