= Bill McGuffie =

Scottish pianist, composer and conductor (1927–1987)

Bill McGiffie
- Born: William McGuffie; 11 December 1927; Carmyle, Glasgow, Scotland
- Died: 22 March 1987 (aged 59) Chertsey, Surrey, England
- Genres: MOR; Jazz
- Occupations: Musician; Composer; Conductor
- Instrument: Piano
- Years active: 1946–1987

William McGuffie (11 December 1927 – 22 March 1987) was a British pianist, who went on to become a film composer and conductor. He also made several television appearances, most notably in Softly, Softly as a pub pianist.

== Biography ==
Bill McGuffie was born in Carmyle near Glasgow, Scotland. After three years studying the piano he had an accident as a child which caused the loss of his second finger of his right hand. Despite the accident, he started playing again and modified his technique to cope with the handicap. Aged 11, he was awarded the Victoria Medal for his piano proficiency by the Victoria College, Glasgow. He found it difficult and decided to stop playing until it was suggested by friends and colleagues that he tried playing dance music which was new to him. In 1944, aged 17, he moved to London from Glasgow and began a career in 1946 playing in the Teddy Foster Orchestra at the Lyceum.

Additional work with other top bands followed until, in October 1952, he got his big break when the BBC formed their own 'Show Band' run by Cyril Stapleton. McGuffie was a featured artist on regular BBC broadcasts and developed a big public following, which led to a recording contract and he was voted in top place in the Melody Maker readers' poll for three years (1953, 1954 and 1955). This led to him appearing in the early Esquire jazz poll winners records and in May 1955 he recorded with trumpeter Kenny Baker's Dozen, although he was not a fully fledged jazz pianist. In 1960, he was mentioned in the Melody Maker readers' poll again although was no longer top of the list.

He made a limited number of records which were 'jazz tinged' and a big band record with a number of prominent jazz musicians under his own name, but bigger success came with his light music and his "with strings" albums. He was noted for his great musicianship and his impeccable good taste. Of his jazz records only the Kenny Baker Dozen recordings and one track from the Melody Maker's All-Stars are now available on CD. He made many other records with no jazz content at all. He also worked extensively with bandleader Joe Loss, who featured McGuffie in his band for four years.

As well as conducting many film scores, McGuffie also wrote several of his own, and is most remembered for his music for the movie Daleks' Invasion Earth 2150 A.D. (1966), based on the television series Doctor Who and starring Peter Cushing. He provided the music for The Challenge (1960), The Leather Boys (1964), The Comedy Man (1964), Corruption (1968), the cult horror film The Asphyx (1973), and The Cherry Picker (1974). He went on to record a large number of 'middle of the road' LPs in the 1970s, and performed on many occasions with Benny Goodman outfits when Goodman toured in Europe. McGuffie can be heard playing with the Benny Goodman Sextet, recorded live in Copenhagen in 1972. He won an Ivor Novello Award in 1960 for his composition "Sweet September", a Song Writers' Guild Badge of Merit in 1980, and started a charity in aid of autistic children called The Niner Club, relating to his lost finger. In 1980, the British Academy of Songwriters, Composers and Authors awarded him its Gold Badge of Merit.

McGuiffie continued to work regularly up until 1983, and the onset of cancer, from which he died four years later in 1987, aged 59.
