= Our Man in Marrakesh =

1966 British film by Don Sharp

- British cinema poster by Tom Chantrell
- Directed by: Don Sharp
- Written by: Peter Yeldham
- Based on: original story by Peter Welbeck (Harry Alan Towers)
- Produced by: Harry Alan Towers
- Starring: Tony Randall; Senta Berger; Herbert Lom; Wilfrid Hyde-White; Terry-Thomas
- Cinematography: Michael Reed
- Edited by: Teddy Darvas
- Music by: Malcolm Lockyer
- Production company: Marrakesh Film
- Distributed by: Anglo-Amalgamated; American International Pictures (US)
- Release date: 5 May 1966 (UK)
- Running time: 92 minutes
- Country: United Kingdom
- Language: English

Our Man in Marrakesh (also known as Intriga Brutal; U.S. title: Bang! Bang! You're Dead!) is a 1966 British comedy spy film directed by Don Sharp and starring Tony Randall, Herbert Lom and Senta Berger. It was written by Peter Yeldham from a story by Harry Alan Towers (as Peter Welbeck) and produced by Towers.

In the film, a courier transports the bribe money intended to pay for a fixed vote in the United Nations. The courier's identity is unknown, but they are thought to be one of the six persons traveling from Casablanca to Marrakesh on a bus. Intrigue surrounds the traveling group.

== Plot ==
One of six travellers who catch the bus from Casablanca airport to Marrakesh is carrying $2 million to pay a powerful local man to fix United Nations votes on behalf of an unnamed nation. But not even the powerful man knows which of them it is – and his background checks reveal that at least three of them aren't who they claim to be.

As agents from other nations may be among them, he and his henchmen have to be very careful until the courier chooses to reveal himself – or herself. Amidst the international espionage and involvement of criminal gangs, an American businessman finds himself at the centre of the situation and, assisted by an attractive super-spy, must set out to clear his name.

== Main cast ==
- Tony Randall as Andrew Jessel
- Senta Berger as Kyra Stanovy
- Terry-Thomas as El Caid
- Herbert Lom as Mr Casimir
- Wilfrid Hyde-White as Arthur Fairbrother
- Grégoire Aslan as Achmed
- John Le Mesurier as George Lillywhite
- Klaus Kinski as Jonquil
- Margaret Lee as Samia Voss
- Emile Stemmler as hotel clerk
- Helen Sanguinetti as Madame Bouseny
- Francisco Sánchez as Martinez
- William Sanguinetti as police chief
- Hassan Essakali as motorcycle policeman
- Keith Peacock as Philippe
- Burt Kwouk as the import manager

== Production ==
Writer Yeldham and director Sharp were both Australians who worked several times with Harry Alan Towers. Sharp said "it had a cast which showed you where the money had come from." The film was shot in Morocco using "frozen" funds owed to Warner Bros. Sharp says just before filming started Warner's revealed that the exchange rate meant their funds would not cover the cost for the whole film so Towers had to scramble to raise additional financing. This involved Towers arranging for suitcases of cash to be smuggled into the country.

== Reception ==
Our Man in Marrakesh opened in London on 5 May 1966, the same day as A Man Could Get Killed and the day before Modesty Blaise. This caused the critic in The Times to write a combined review titled "Humorous variations on theme of the secret agent", where Our Man in Marrakesh is noted for having a story similar to A Man Could Get Killed. The reviewer wrote: "There are one or two nice ideas, like the chase through the dyers' quarter, with skeins of boldly-coloured wool impeding pursuer and pursued. But the dialogue is mostly so clod-hopping, especially when it tries to be funny, and is delivered so portentously, that director Don Sharp’s occasional pretty pictures fail noticeably to lighten the load."

The Monthly Film Bulletin wrote: "Nicely photographed on location and kept moving at a spanking pace, this is a spy spoof that works because it keeps the thread of the plot well in hand, spreads a few plausible red herrings, and on its own absurd level suspends disbelief without sending up the lunatic conventions. Tony Randall is a pleasantly reluctant hero, the two young women are outstandingly glamorous, Herbert Lom is sinister and suave, and the supporting cast of British stalwarts does its usual stuff with reliability and competence. There is also a 'small bonus in the belated but splendidly characteristic appearance of Terry-Thomas as the Anglophile Arab."

Tony Sloman in The Radio Times Guide to Films gave the film 2/5 stars, writing: "The excellent Tony Randall stars as an American tourist caught up in spy antics in Morocco. The scenery is fabulous and the second-rung supporting cast fun to watch, but the script and production budget would defeat the hardiest director. Still, veteran professionals such as Herbert Lom, Wilfrid Hyde White and Terry-Thomas do what they can with the material, and Klaus Kinski and John Le Mesurier turn up, too."
