= Kevin Davies (director) =

British television and video director

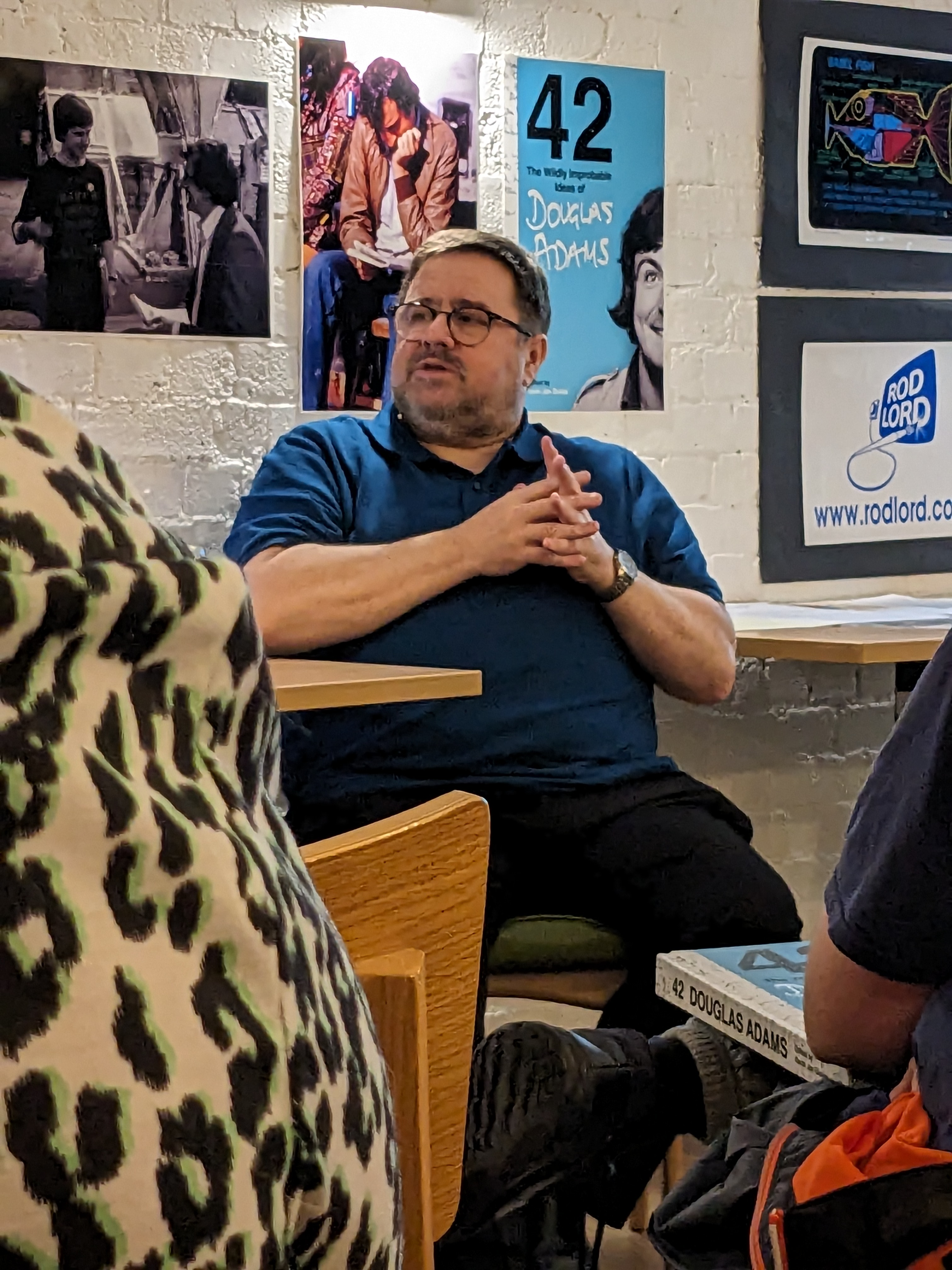
- Davies talking about Douglas Adams in 2023
- Born: Kevin Jon Davies; 3 June 1961 (age 65)
- Occupations: Animator; director

Kevin Jon Davies (born 3 June 1961) is a British television and video director primarily associated with documentaries and spin-off videos associated with Doctor Who, The Hitchhiker's Guide to the Galaxy and Blake's 7. He also worked on the BAFTA award-winning animation sequences of the 1981 Hitchhiker's Guide television adaptation.

Davies wrote and directed the documentaries The Making of the Hitchhiker's Guide to the Galaxy and Doctor Who: Thirty Years in the TARDIS. The latter was commissioned for and aired on BBC One in 1993, in conjunction with the 30th anniversary of Doctor Who. Davies later expanded the documentary for video release under the title More Than Thirty Years in the TARDIS. Portions of other interviews by Davies have also appeared on Doctor Who DVD releases, such as The Beginning box set, and the two-DVD set for City of Death. Davies has also worked on the DVD extras for other BBC titles, such as Dad's Army and The Andromeda Anthology.

Davies created the opening and closing sequences for British science fiction television series Terrahawks using hand-drawn cel animation to imitate computer graphics.

Davies also directed the Doctor Who spin-off video Shakedown: Return of the Sontarans and two episodes of the Sky One science-fiction drama Space Island One.

In addition, Davies also worked in the animation department of the 1988 film Who Framed Roger Rabbit.

In March 2021, Unbound announced a crowdfunder for 42: The Wildly Improbable Ideas of Douglas Adams, a book based on Douglas Adams' papers, edited by Davies. The book was published on 28 August 2023 and became a Sunday Times number one bestseller.

== Selected publications ==
- Davies, Kevin Jon (2023). 42: The Wildly Improbable Ideas of Douglas Adams. Unbound. ISBN 978-1-80018-268-4.
