= Gordon Flemyng =

Scottish director (1934–1995)

- Flemyng during the filming of Daleks' Invasion Earth 2150 A.D.
- Born: Gordon William Flemyng; 7 March 1934; Glasgow, Scotland
- Died: 12 July 1995 (aged 61); London, England
- Occupations: Director, producer, writer
- Children: Jason Flemyng

Gordon William Flemyng (7 March 1934 – 12 July 1995) was a Scottish director, producer and writer. He directed six theatrical features, several television films and numerous episodes of television series, some of which he also wrote and produced.

== Career ==
Flemyng directed episodes of various British television series, including The Younger Generation, The Saint, The Avengers, The Baron, Crown Court, ITV Playhouse, Target, Screenplay, Take My Wife, Cribb, The Brack Report, One Summer, Wish Me Luck, The Bill, Emmerdale Farm, Bergerac, Taggart, Peak Practice, Lovejoy, Minder and Ellington (also produced).

Flemyng directed two entries in Edgar Wallace Mysteries (US: The Edgar Wallace Mystery Theatre) series of second features and the two Dalek feature films of the 1960s, Dr. Who and the Daleks (1965) and Daleks' Invasion Earth 2150 A.D. (1966). Two episodes of The Baron that he directed were put together as a 1966 feature film entitled Mystery Island and released in some markets.

Flemyng directed a Hollywood film with an all-star cast, The Split, released in 1968, a crime drama with Jim Brown, Ernest Borgnine and Gene Hackman, based on a novel by Donald E. Westlake. He also directed the British war film The Last Grenade (1970).

His other credits include Saki (miniseries); Härte 10 (West German miniseries); Philby, Burgess and Maclean (TV); Flight Into Hell; Cloud Waltzing (TV), Marty Abroad (1971 - TV, produced only) and Confessional (1989 - TV, also produced).

== Personal life ==
Flemyng was a native of Glasgow and the father of actor Jason Flemyng. He died in London at the age of 61.

== Selected filmography ==
- Edgar Wallace Mysteries/The Edgar Wallace Mystery Theatre
  - Solo for Sparrow (1962)
  - Five to One (1963)
- Just for Fun (1963)
- Dr. Who and the Daleks (1965)
- The Baron (1966)
  - Mystery Island (1966)
- Daleks' Invasion Earth 2150 A.D. (1966)
- Great Catherine (1968)
- The Split (1968)
- The Last Grenade (1970)
- Flight into Hell (1985)
