= Doctor Who: Thirty Years in the TARDIS =

1993 BBC television documentary

- Genre: Fantasy Arts documentary
- Directed by: Kevin Davies
- Starring: Jon Pertwee; Colin Baker; Sylvester McCoy
- Narrated by: Nicholas Courtney
- Country of origin: United Kingdom
- Original language: English

Production
- Executive producer: Sue Kerr
- Producer: Kevin Davies
- Cinematography: John Adderley FRGS
- Editor: Paul Ratcliffe
- Running time: 50 minutes

Original release
- Network: BBC1 (BBC2 in Scotland)
- Release: 29 November 1993

Related
- Doctor Who

Doctor Who: Thirty Years in the TARDIS is a special 50-minute television documentary celebrating the 30th anniversary of the science-fiction series Doctor Who. It was originally broadcast on Monday, 29 November 1993, on BBC1 (BBC2 in Scotland). The programme was the first BBC-produced, in-depth documentary chronicling Doctor Who since Whose Doctor Who was broadcast in April 1977, and it followed a 30-minute, categorized compilation of archive clips broadcast in 1992 on BBC2 entitled Resistance is Useless. The show featured many clips from the show's episodes, and interviews with the cast and crew. Several iconic scenes from the show were recreated, with young actor Josh Maguire playing the part of a child imagining himself involved in the settings.

The documentary was produced and directed by Kevin Davies, with Sue Kerr as executive producer. Davies' initial idea for the programme was a part-documentary, part-drama called The Legend Begins, combining interviews with Doctor Who's creators with dramatised sequences showing how the events took place. It evolved into a proposal called Eulogy for the Doctor, featuring several actors who had appeared as the Doctor's companions, returning to their roles for a drama linking archive clips from the series. Eventually, all of these ideas were scaled down or abandoned in favour of a straightforward documentary format. In 2013, the idea of a drama depicting the origins of Doctor Who was used for An Adventure in Space and Time, broadcast on the BBC, commemorating the series' 50th anniversary.

The documentary was never repeated on the BBC, but an expanded version premiered at BAFTA on 5 November 1994 titled Even More Than Thirty Years in the TARDIS. It was followed by a 90-minute release on VHS titled More Than... Thirty Years in the TARDIS, which included many interviews and clips not in the broadcast version. In 2013, More Than... Thirty Years in the TARDIS was released on DVD as part of The Legacy Collection box set, alongside the uncompleted 1979 Doctor Who serial Shada.

The interviewees included actors Jon Pertwee, Colin Baker, Sylvester McCoy, Carole Ann Ford, Roberta Tovey, Jennie Linden, Deborah Watling, Frazer Hines, Nicholas Courtney, Elisabeth Sladen, Nicola Bryant and Sophie Aldred. William Hartnell's granddaughter, Jessica Carney, was also interviewed, as well as producers Verity Lambert, Barry Letts, Philip Hinchcliffe and John Nathan-Turner, writers Terry Nation, Terrance Dicks, Douglas Adams, Eric Saward and Ben Aaronovitch, and BBC1 controller Alan Yentob. The documentary also features the thoughts of longtime critic of the series Mary Whitehouse.
