= Eddie Powell =

British actor and stuntman (1927–2000)

- Powell in Daleks' Invasion Earth 2150 A.D. (1966)
- Born: 9 March 1927; London, England
- Died: 11 August 2000 (aged 73); Berkshire, England
- Occupations: stuntman, actor
- Years active: 1958–1996
- Spouse: Rosemary Burrows (1967-2000; his death)
- Relatives: Joe Powell (brother)

Eddie Powell (9 March 1927 – 11 August 2000) was a British stuntman and actor.

Powell performed stuntwork in several films for Hammer Studios, serving as a regular stunt double for Christopher Lee. His credits during this time included portraying Thompson in Daleks' Invasion Earth 2150 A.D. (1966) and the Mummy in The Mummy's Shroud (1967). He also appeared in several James Bond films.

Powell portrayed the Aliens for stuntwork in Alien (1979) and Aliens (1986). He also did stunts in Indiana Jones and the Last Crusade (1989), Batman (1989), and Robin Hood: Prince of Thieves (1991). He had an uncredited part as The Goat of Mendes in The Devil Rides Out (1968).

Powell died on 11 August 2000 in Berkshire, at the age of 73.

== Filmography ==
Year	Title	Role	Notes
1953	The Titfield Thunderbolt	Townsman	Uncredited
1961	The Guns of Navarone	German Soldier	Uncredited
1964	The Curse of the Mummy's Tomb	2nd Arab	Uncredited
1965	She	Thug	Uncredited
1966	Daleks' Invasion Earth 2150 A.D.	Thompson	
1967	The Mummy's Shroud	The Mummy	
1967	Casino Royale	Scottish Strongman	Uncredited
1967	Quatermass and the Pit	Journalist	Uncredited
1968	The Lost Continent	The Inquisitor	
1968	The Devil Rides Out	The Goat of Mendes	Uncredited
1968	Attack on the Iron Coast	Commando	Uncredited
1969	The Oblong Box	Fighting Man in Tavern	Uncredited
1976	The Pink Panther Strikes Again	Man in Bar	Uncredited
1977	Candleshoe	Hood	Uncredited
1979	Alien	Alien	Uncredited
1980	Flash Gordon	Ming's Brute #6	
1985	Legend	Mummified Guard	
1986	Aliens	Alien	Uncredited
1986	Half Moon Street	S.A.S. Man	Uncredited
