= Roberta Tovey =

English actress (born 1953)

- Born: 9 August 1953 (age 73); London, England
- Occupations: Film and television actress
- Years active: 1960–1987
- Known for: Dr. Who and the Daleks (1965); Daleks' Invasion Earth 2150 A.D. (1966)

Roberta Tovey (born 9 August 1953) is an English actress who has appeared in films and television programmes. One of her better-known roles was that of Susan, the granddaughter of Dr. Who, in the films Dr. Who and the Daleks (1965) and Daleks' Invasion Earth 2150 A.D. (1966), which starred Peter Cushing as Dr. Who. She also appeared in the films Never Let Go (1960), Touch of Death (1961), A High Wind in Jamaica (1965), Runaway Railway (1965), Operation Third Form (1966) and The Beast in the Cellar (1970), and the TV series Not in Front of the Children (1967–68), Going Straight (1978) and My Husband and I (1987).

She appeared on The Film Programme on BBC Radio 4 on 30 May 2013, with Bernard Cribbins, in which they looked back at their roles in the Dr. Who films of the 1960s. This was in commemoration of the 50th anniversary of the first episode of Doctor Who.

She is the daughter of the actor George Tovey. George Tovey also has a Doctor Who connection, having appeared in Part Two of Pyramids of Mars in 1975.

She has appeared at some Doctor Who conventions around the UK, recalling her time on the 1960s Dalek movies.
