= MidKent College =

Further education college in Kent, England

Coordinates: 51°23′39″N 0°32′32″E

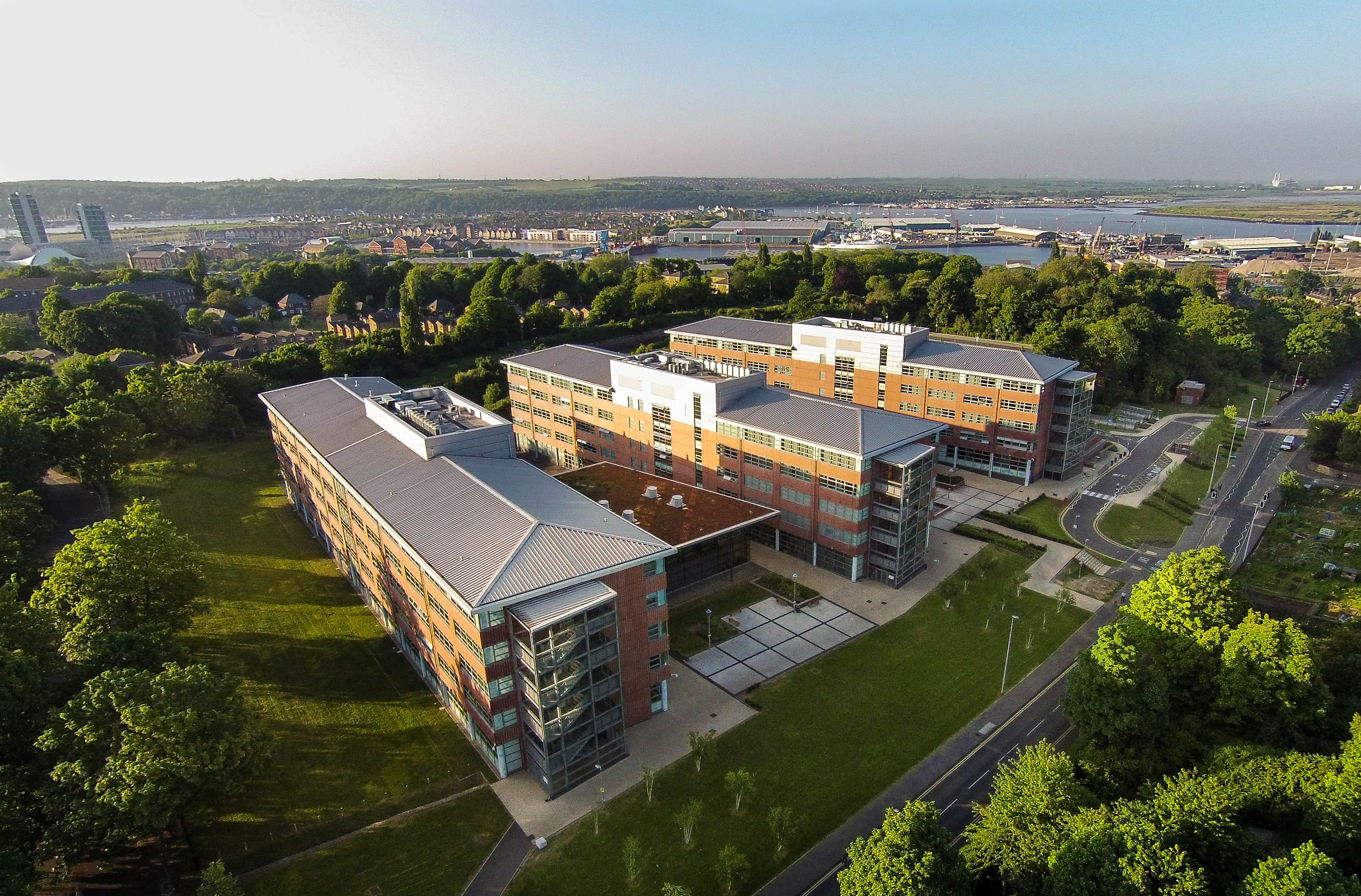
- Aerial view of the MidKent College Medway Campus in Gillingham, Kent

Location
- Medway Road; Gillingham Maidstone, Kent; United Kingdom

Information
- Former name: Medway College of Technology; Medway and Maidstone College of Technology; Mid‑Kent College of Higher and Further Education
- School type: Government‑funded, Further Education College
- Established: 1887
- Status: Operational
- Sister school: Maidstone Campus, MidKent College (Oakwood Park)
- School district: Medway; Maidstone
- Educational authority: Medway (Local Education Authority)
- Oversight: Ofsted
- Ofsted: Reports
- Chairperson: Angela Woodhouse
- Administrator: Mr Simon Cook
- Officer in charge: Simon Cook
- Staff: 726 administrative staff
- Gender: Mixed
- Age range: 16–99
- Enrolment: ≈ 8,500 (2023)
- Education system: UK Further Education
- Hours in school day: Approximately 8 hours
- Campus: Medway Campus; Maidstone Campus
- Student Union/Association: MidKent College Students’ Union
- Communities served: Kent; Medway
- Affiliation: University of Kent; Association of South East Colleges
- Website: midkent.ac.uk

MidKent College (formerly Mid-Kent College of Higher and Further Education) is a further education college in Kent, England. It runs courses from two separate campuses in Maidstone and Medway, including a number of higher education courses. There are approximately 8,500 students aged 16 years and upwards enrolled at the college. Courses offered range from pre-entry level to degree level and cover a wide range of vocational and academic subject areas.

== History ==
The college has been delivering vocational education in Medway and Maidstone for nearly 100 years. Its roots lie in the technical institutes established within the Medway towns in the 1890s and Maidstone around 1918. The college first began delivering courses from the Horsted Centre in Chatham in 1954. The site was opened as Medway College of Technology by the Prince Philip on 5 April the following year. Medway College of Technology and Maidstone Technical College amalgamated in 1966 to become Medway and Maidstone College of Technology. The purpose-built City Way site in Rochester was subsequently opened as an additional college site in 1968.

The college changed its name to Mid-Kent College of Higher and Further Education in 1978, before dropping the hyphen and space and the latter part of its title to become MidKent College in October 2008.Throughout the 1950s, 60s and 70s, the college's students were famed for their Rag Day parade. This saw them conducting a carnival procession through the Medway Towns. The parade started at Gillingham railway station and ended at the esplanade in Rochester. Each year the students elected their own "Rag Day Queen" to head the procession.

== Campuses ==
=== Gillingham (Medway) Campus ===
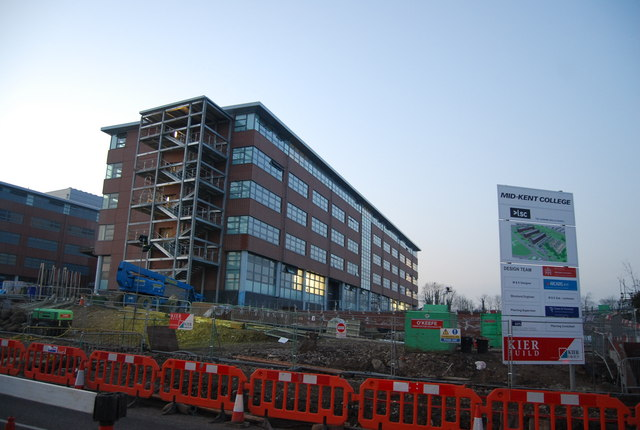
Mid Kent College Medway Campus under construction (31 January 2009)

MidKent College's Medway Campus in Gillingham, located on Prince Arthur Road, became the college’s main site in September 2009, replacing the former Horsted and City Way campuses. The £86 million project, mostly funded by the Learning and Skills Council, began construction in 2007. The campus was officially opened by Princess Anne on 25 March 2010. The campus was designed to meet contemporary vocational training needs (including media, IT, science and engineering workshops) and won planning clearance after archaeological surveys. During construction, workers uncovered a unique Napoleonic-era “listening post” (a domed ‘igloo’ intended to detect tunnelling) which was carefully preserved in place.

The Gillingham site lies on part of Chatham’s historic Great Lines defensive earthworks (the old “Lower Lines” field-of-fire). Planning documents note that the land had been “used by the military over the years for…[siege] works up to and including the First World War”. Archaeological evidence of the old defences and training works remain on site (including ruins of small buildings and two brick cottages). In recent decades, when not used as training grounds, the overgrown tract served as council-owned open space (Lower Lines) adjacent to Brompton Barracks.

=== Maidstone (Oakwood Park) Campus ===
MidKent College’s Maidstone Campus is a further and higher education campus of MidKent College, located at Oakwood Park on Tonbridge Road, south of Maidstone town centre. The campus serves several thousand students each year, offering vocational and academic courses up to degree level (through University Centre Maidstone on site). The site sits within the historic Oakwood Park estate, whose 19th-century mansion (Oakwood House) and grounds have long been repurposed for education and community uses.

The Oakwood Park estate originated as a Victorian mansion estate. Oakwood House, on the north side of the site, was built in 1869 by Lewis Davis Wigan. The Wigan family – of banking and hop-merchants – developed the property and grounds. After World War II, Kent County Council purchased Oakwood Park from the Wigan estate in October 1948. In the following decades, portions of the park were used for various community purposes (such as a golf course and military exercises during WWII), but notably the Council also established educational facilities there. Oakwood House itself was later used as a hotel, conference and training centre, and as of 2023 was renovated as offices for multiple county services.

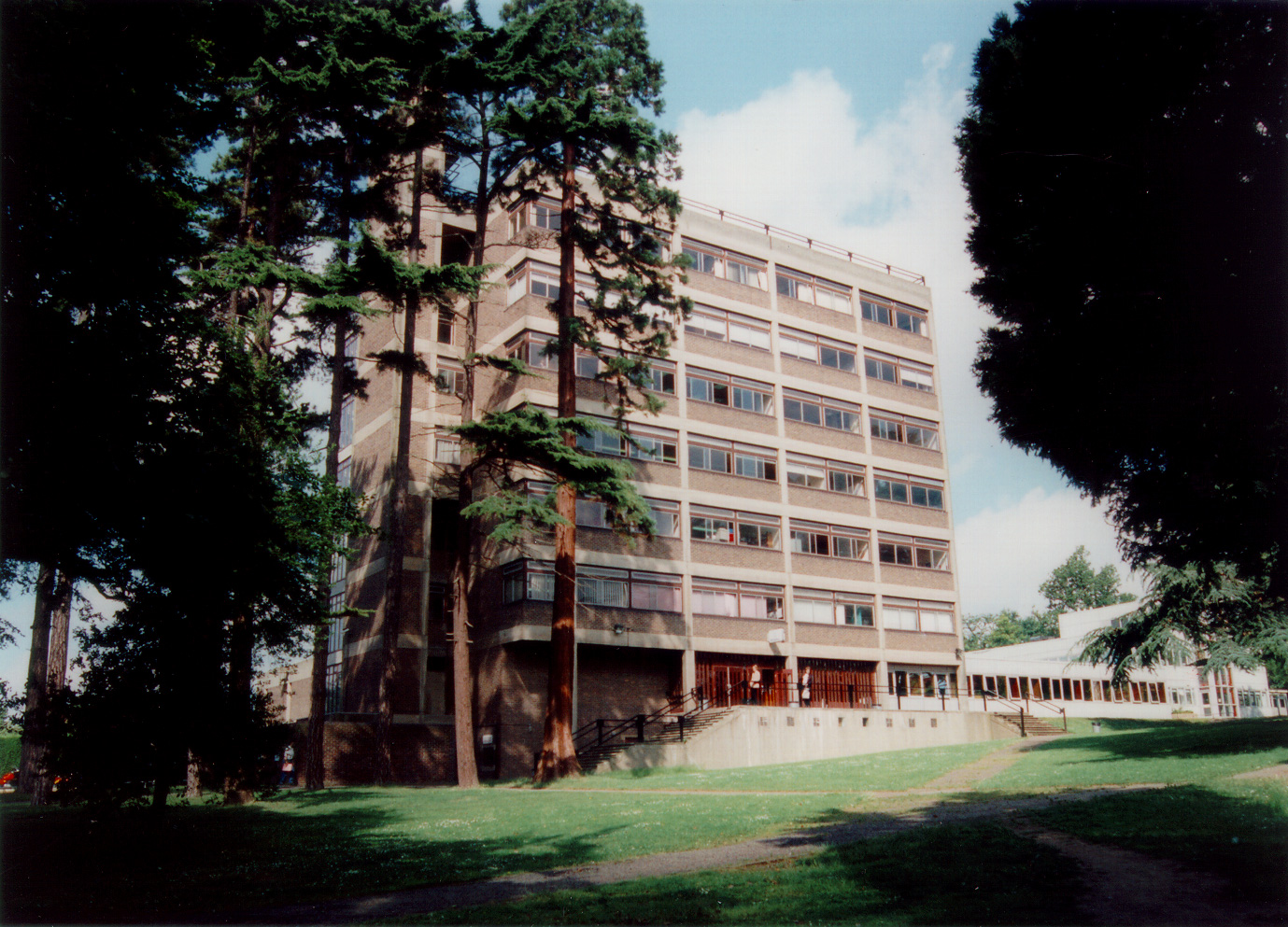
Mid Kent College Oakwood Park site (21 May 2009)

By the mid-20th century, the Oakwood Park campus had become an education hub. In the 1960s the site hosted Maidstone Technical School for Boys. The grounds soon accommodated two main further-education colleges: Maidstone College of Technology and Maidstone College of Art. The Maidstone College of Art traced its origins to an art class opened in 1867 in Maidstone town, and this college eventually relocated to the Oakwood Park site in 1969. (Its legacy continued through later institutions: in 1987 it became part of the Kent Institute of Art & Design, and in 2005 part of the University College for the Creative Arts, which became the University for the Creative Arts.) Meanwhile, Maidstone College of Technology operated on Oakwood Park throughout the late 20th century. These two colleges (the art college and the technical college) were later incorporated into MidKent College.

In 1966, Maidstone College of Technology merged with Medway College of Technology to form Medway and Maidstone College of Technology. That combined institution was renamed Mid-Kent College of Higher and Further Education in 1978 and eventually shortened to MidKent College in 2008. MidKent College thus brought together the Maidstone and Medway (Gillingham) campuses under one college. In the Maidstone area, the former Maidstone Technical and Art colleges became integrated into MidKent’s Maidstone Campus.

In 2011 MidKent College acquired the former Maidstone campus of the University for the Creative Arts (UCA) at Oakwood Park. UCA (formerly Kent Institute of Art & Design) had offered art, media and design courses at Oakwood Park, but its Maidstone site was sold to MidKent. UCA’s final intake of students there was in 2013 and the last diplomas were completed by mid-2014. Thereafter the former art college buildings were fully integrated into MidKent’s campus. (Kent Online reported in 2012 that “the entire site was purchased by neighbouring MidKent College” and by 2014 UCA “will pack up its easels for the last time” in Maidstone.) By this point, the Oakwood Park campus encompassed what had been Maidstone Technical College, Maidstone College of Art, and adjacent school buildings; all were operated under MidKent College.

== Redevelopment and facilities ==
Since the early 2010s the Oakwood Park campus has undergone major redevelopment. In late 2012 the college embarked on a £22–25 million refurbishment of the Maidstone facilities. (Planning permission for the work was granted by Maidstone Borough Council in 2015.) By 2014 much of the £25 million redevelopment was complete, yielding new workshops and state-of-the-art vocational facilities at the Maidstone Campus. For example, heavy-industry workshops (bricklaying, carpentry, automotive, welding, etc.) and a modern learning resource centre were built on the site. The college describes the campus as providing a “range of quality workshops” and facilities including a refectory and social zone. The Maidstone Campus also includes the University Centre Maidstone (UCM) building, which was opened in summer 2016 and offers specialized facilities for higher-education courses.

=== University Centre Maidstone ===
University Centre Maidstone (UCM) is the higher-education centre on the Oakwood Park campus. It occupies the former UCA art college building, which was renovated as part of the redevelopment. The UCM opened in July 2016 as “brand-new facilities equipped for higher-level skills”. The building offers lecture theatres, dedicated laboratories and workshops (for engineering, construction, art, media, etc.), new training kitchens, a refectory and coffee shop, and an on-site library and study centre. All of MidKent’s degree and professional courses in Maidstone are taught at UCM. According to the college, the UCM project was “phase two of the wider development of the College’s Maidstone Campus” and followed over £20 million of investment. Like the rest of the campus, UCM was designed as an energy-efficient, sustainable facility. (The University of Greenwich partners with MidKent to validate some of the UCM degrees.)

=== Green Skills Factory and sustainability ===
In the 2020s the Maidstone Campus expanded its focus on sustainable construction and energy training. In 2023 MidKent opened a new Sustainable Construction “Skills Factory” at the Maidstone campus, funded by the national Strategic Development Fund. This facility provides hands-on training in energy efficiency, low-carbon building techniques and renewable energy for construction professionals and students. (MidKent reports that the Maidstone Campus is also home to a “Home Energy Centre” for training in sustainable heating systems. The Skills Factory centre is meant to prepare students with the “green skills and knowledge” needed by local industry. College leaders have highlighted that this development ties into MidKent’s goal of making the Maidstone campus carbon-neutral by 2030.

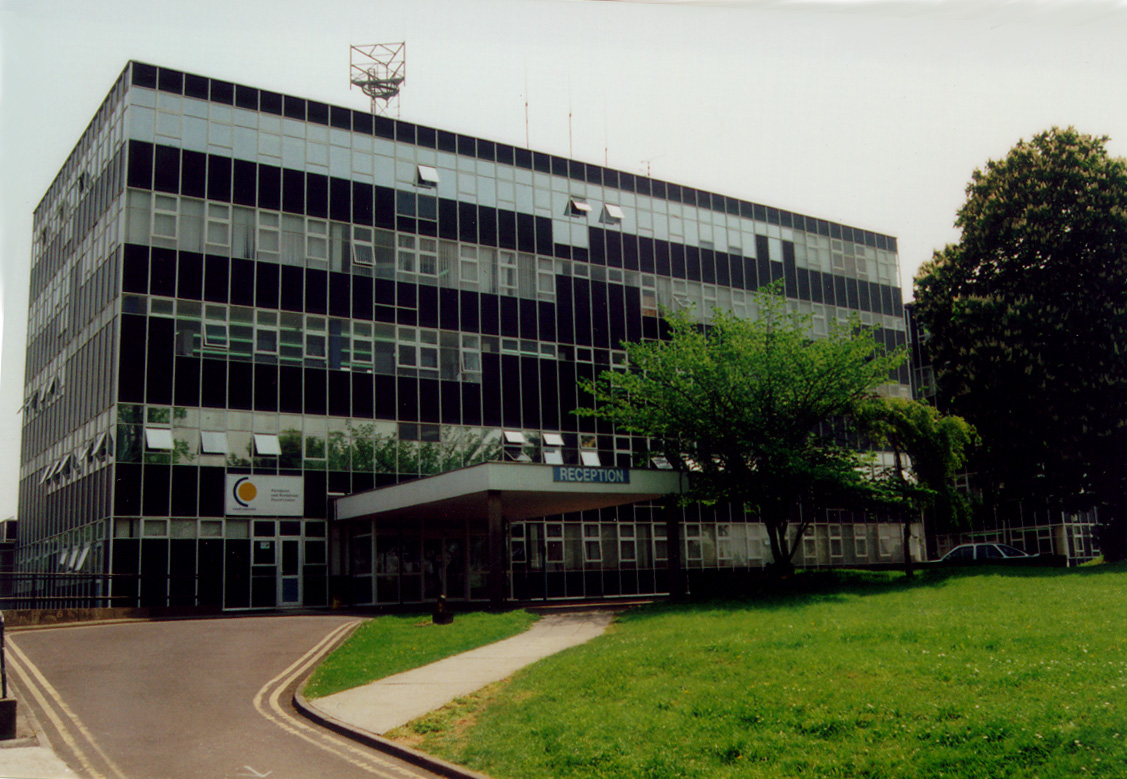
Former Midkent College in City Way, Rochester in May 2009

=== Horsted (Chatham) Campus ===
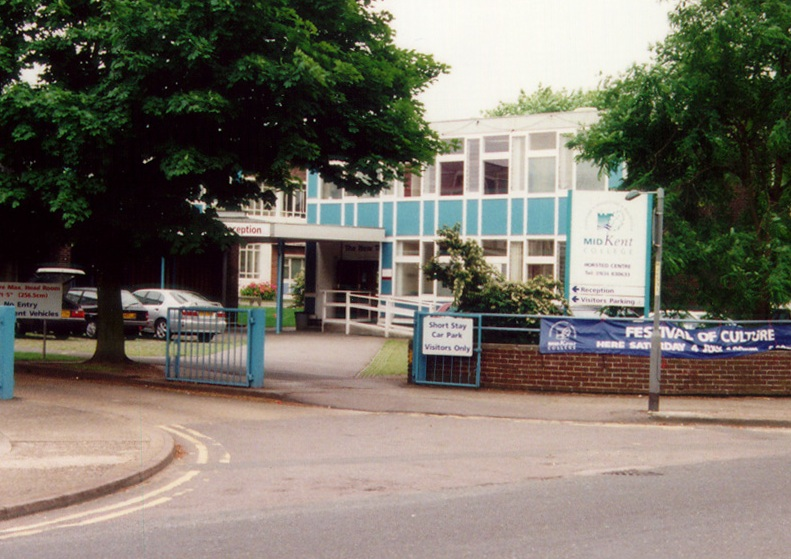
Former Midkent College in Horsted, Rochester in May 2009

The Horsted Centre (Chatham) was the original Medway campus of the college, opened in 1954 (first courses) and formally inaugurated in 1955. By the 2000s it was outdated; courses were moved out to the Gillingham campus in 2009. In planning documents from 2005, the Horsted site was approved for mixed residential redevelopment (outline permission for up to 336 homes and some community facilities). The old Horsted buildings were cleared in 2014 and the site has since been redeveloped for housing.

=== City Way (Rochester) Campus ===
The City Way campus in Rochester opened in 1968 and served MidKent (then Mid-Kent) for decades. Like Horsted, it closed in 2009 when the new Gillingham campus opened. Planning permission was then granted to redevelop City Way for housing. For example, an outline application approved in 2007 required 25% of the new homes to be “affordable” and included developer contributions for local schools and transport The site has since been built over (apart from a few buildings preserved elsewhere) and is now a residential area.

== Principal ==
The current principal of MidKent College is Simon Cook, who has held the position since July 2014 after the death of principal Sue McLeod.

McLeod had previously worked across the Caribbean, United States and Europe during her time in the travel industry, including a stint aboard cruise liners. She had earlier achieved a degree in Business Studies at the Dorset Institute of Higher Education – now Bournemouth University – where she returned to study Travel and Tourism prior to embarking on her teaching career with MidKent College.

In 2014 Sue McLeod was diagnosed with a brain tumour. On 24 July 2014, MidKent College informed the public via social media that she had died, the statement stated "It is with great sadness that MidKent College announces the death of its much-loved principal Sue McLeod at the age of 53."

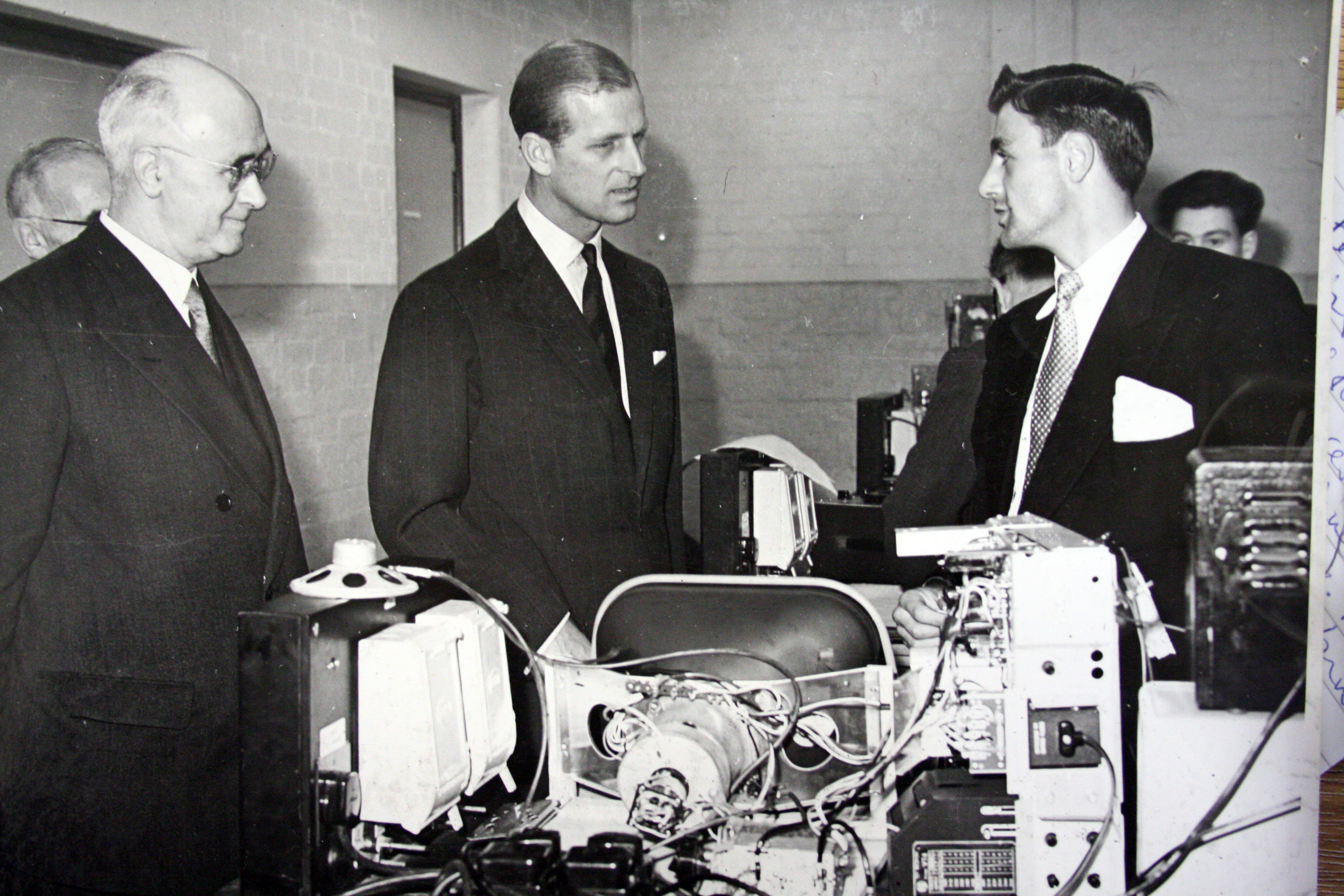
The Duke of Edinburgh visits the college's electronics department as he opens the Horsted site

== Chief Executive ==
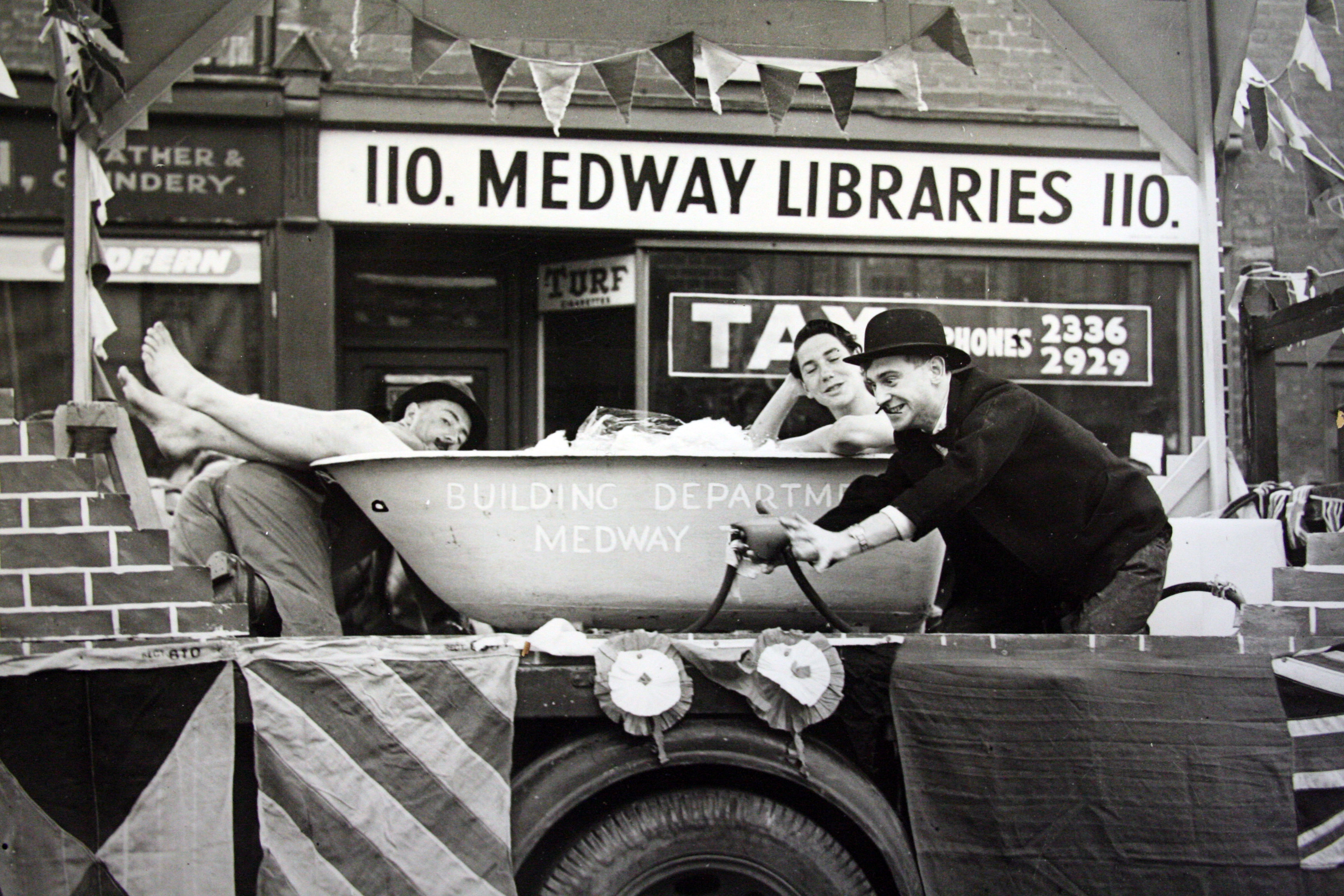
Students take part in the college Rag Day, 1951

The current chief executive of MidKent College is Simon Cook, who has held the position since the retirement of previous CEO, Stephen Grix, in July 2016.

Mr Grix first joined the college in 1971 when, having left school at age 15 with no formal qualifications, enrolled as a day-release bricklaying student at the old Horsted site in Chatham. After 13 years in the trade he returned to study an education degree, followed by a master's degree in education management. The father-of-three eventually went on to become principal of Sir George Monoux College in Walthamstow, north-east London, and then head of Ofsted's post-compulsory education division. Next was a role as director of education for the London Borough of Tower Hamlets before Mr Grix returned to MidKent College as principal and chief executive in March 2005. Once back at the place where he launched his career, Mr Grix took on the mammoth task of closing the college's dated Horsted and City Way sites and identifying funding opportunities for the new £86 million Medway Campus, which opened in 2009. He then turned his attention to improving the Maidstone Campus, which is currently undergoing a £23m redevelopment due for completion in December 2013.

In January 2013, Mr Grix announced he would step down as principal at the end of the academic year but continue as chief executive on a part-time basis until 2015. He was succeeded as principal by his former deputy Sue McLeod. In June 2013 Mr Grix was appointed an OBE for services to further education in The Queen's Birthday Honours List. Mr Grix is also an executive director of MKC Training Services Ltd, which administers the college's contract to deliver training within the Royal School of Military Engineering at Brompton Barracks.

== Affiliations ==
MidKent College became an associate college of the University of Kent in 2001. The University of Kent validates the college's higher education programmes.

== Notable alumni ==
- Mo Abudu, African businesswoman and television personality
- Matt Coles, England cricketer
- Kat Driscoll, Olympic trampolinist
- Charlotte Evans, Winter Paralympic gold medalist
- Caroline Feraday, television and radio broadcaster
- Jack Green, Olympic hurdler
- Neil Reynolds, television presenter and journalist
