= 1966 in the United Kingdom =

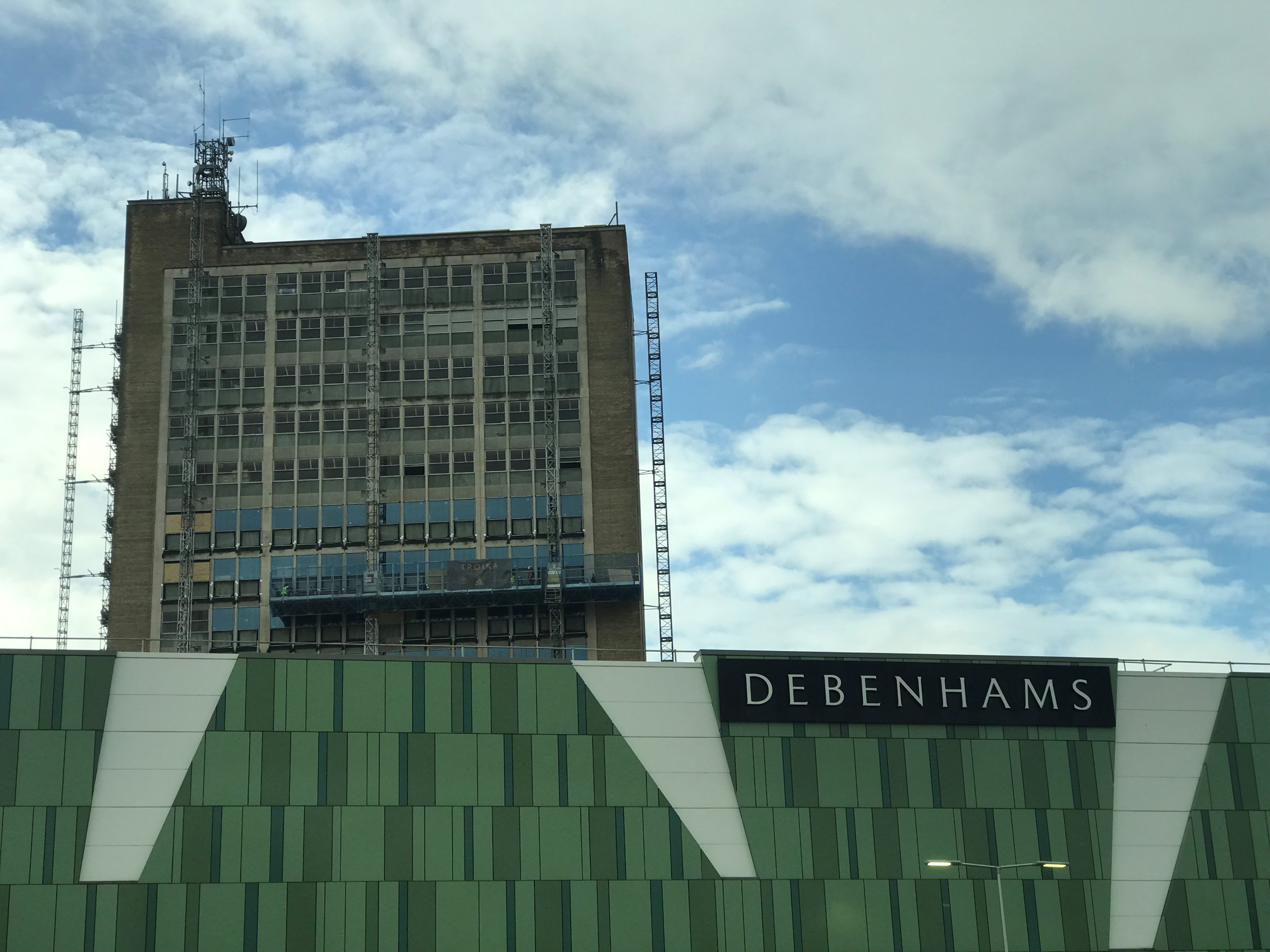
The Chartist Tower was constant in 1966

Events from the year 1966 in the United Kingdom.

== Incumbents ==
- Monarch – Elizabeth II
- Prime Minister – Harold Wilson (Labour)

== Events ==
=== January–March ===
- 3 January
  - British Rail begins full electric passenger train services over the West Coast Main Line from Euston to Manchester and Liverpool with 100 miles per hour (160 km/h) operation from London to Rugby. Services officially inaugurated 18 April.
  - Stop-motion children's television series Camberwick Green first shown on BBC One as part of Watch with Mother.
- 4 January – More than 4,000 people attend a memorial service at Westminster Abbey for the broadcaster Richard Dimbleby, who died last month aged 52.
- 12 January – Three British MPs visiting Rhodesia (Christopher Rowland, Jeremy Bray and David Ennals) are assaulted there by supporters of Rhodesian Prime Minister Ian Smith.
- 20 January
  - The Queen commutes the death sentence on a Black prisoner in Rhodesia, two months after its abolition in the UK.
  - Radio Caroline South pirate radio ship MV Mi Amigo runs aground on the beach at Frinton.
- 21 January – The White minority-ruled regime in Rhodesia rejects the royal prerogative commuting death sentences on two Africans.
- 27 January – The Labour Party unexpectedly retains the parliamentary seat of Hull North in a by-election, with a swing of 4.5% to their candidate from the opposition Conservatives, and a majority up from 1,181 at the 1964 General Election to 5,351.
- 30 January – Action Man toy figure launched in the UK.
- 31 January – The United Kingdom ceases all trade with Rhodesia.
- 9 February – A prototype Fast Reactor nuclear reactor opens at Dounreay on the north coast of Scotland.
- 17 February – The UK protests to South Africa over its supplying of petrol to Rhodesia.
- 19 February – Naval minister Christopher Mayhew resigns over a government policy to abandon an aircraft carrier project.
- 28 February – Harold Wilson calls a snap general election for 31 March, in hope of increasing his vulnerable single-seat majority in Parliament.
- 1 March – Chancellor of the Exchequer James Callaghan announces the decision to embrace decimalisation of the pound (which will be effected on 15 February 1971).
- 4 March
  - In an interview published in the Evening Standard, John Lennon of The Beatles comments, "We're more popular than Jesus now".
  - The UK gives recognition to the new regime in Ghana.
- 5 March – BOAC Flight 911 crashes in severe clear-air turbulence over Mount Fuji soon after taking off from Tokyo International Airport in Japan, killing all 124 on board.
- 9 March – Ronnie Kray, one of the Kray twins, shoots George Cornell (an associate of rivals The Richardson Gang) at The Blind Beggar pub in Whitechapel, East London. Cornell dies later in hospital, and Kray is finally convicted in 1969.
- 10 March – The Frost Report, which launches the television careers of John Cleese, Ronnie Barker and Ronnie Corbett and other writers and performers, is first broadcast on BBC One
- 11 March – Chi-Chi, London Zoo's giant panda, is flown to the Soviet Union for a union with An-An of Moscow Zoo.
- 20 March – Theft of football's Jules Rimet Trophy whilst on exhibition in London.
- 23 March – Pope Paul VI and Michael Ramsey, the Archbishop of Canterbury, meet in Rome.
- 27 March – Pickles, a mongrel dog, finds the FIFA World Cup Trophy wrapped in newspaper in a garden in South London.
- 30 March – Opinion polls show that the Labour government is on course to significantly increase its parliamentary majority at the general election tomorrow.
- 31 March – The Labour Party led by Harold Wilson win the general election with a landslide majority of 96 seats. At the 1964 election held just 17 months earlier, Labour had a narrow majority of five seats but subsequent by-election defeats had led to that being reduced to just one seat prior to this election. The Birmingham Edgbaston seat is retained for the Conservatives by Jill Knight in succession to Edith Pitt, the first time two female MPs have followed each other in the same constituency.

=== April–June ===
- 1 April – Local government reorganisation sees the reduction in the number of local authorities, with many smaller urban districts and boroughs being absorbed into newly created and expanded boroughs. The reorganisation also sees a number of county boundaries altered. The West Midlands region sees some of the most notable changes, with most of Sedgley and Brierley Hill being added to an expanded Dudley borough, which also takes in the southern part of Coseley. Warley County Borough is created from the former boroughs of Oldbury, Smethwick and Rowley Regis as well as parts of Dudley, Tipton and Halesowen. Dudley is transferred from Worcestershire to Staffordshire, while Smethwick and Rowley Regis are both transferred from Staffordshire to Worcestershire.
- 6 April – Hoverlloyd inaugurate the first regular hovercraft service across the English Channel, from Ramsgate Harbour to Calais using passenger-carrying SR.N6 craft (discontinued in 2000 due to competition with the Channel Tunnel).
- 7 April – The United Kingdom asks the United Nations Security Council to use force to stop oil tankers that violate the oil embargo against Rhodesia. Authority is given on 10 April.
- 11 April – The Marquess of Bath, in conjunction with Jimmy Chipperfield, opens Longleat Safari Park, with "the lions of Longleat", at his Longleat House, the first such drive-through safari park outside of Africa.
- 15 April – Time magazine uses the phrase 'Swinging London'.
- 19 April – Ian Brady and Myra Hindley go on trial at Chester Crown Court, charged with murdering two children and a teenager in the highly publicised Moors murders which came to light in October last year. The prosecution is led by the Attorney General, Sir Elwyn Jones.
- 30 April – Liverpool F.C. win the Football League First Division title for the second time in three seasons.
- 1 May – The Beatles play their last conventional live concert in Britain, at the Empire Pool (Wembley) on the bill alongside The Rolling Stones and The Who.
- 2 May – Scottish inventor James Goodfellow obtains a patent for an automated teller machine using a plastic card and PIN.
- 3 May – "Pirate" radio stations Swinging Radio England and Britain Radio commence broadcasting on AM with a combined potential 100,000 watts from the same ship anchored off the south coast of England in international waters.
- 6 May – The Moors murderers, Ian Brady and Myra Hindley, are sentenced at Chester Crown Court to life imprisonment for three child murders committed between November 1963 and October 1965 in the north west of England. Brady is guilty of all three murders and receives three concurrent terms of life imprisonment, while Hindley is found guilty of two murder charges and an accessory charge in connection to the third. She is sentenced to two concurrent life sentences alongside a seven-year fixed term. In 1986 they admit to two further child murders. Both will die in custody.
- 12 May – African members of the UN Security Council say that the British Army should blockade Rhodesia.
- 14 May – Everton F.C. defeat Sheffield Wednesday 3–2 in the FA Cup final at Wembley Stadium, overturning a 2–0 Sheffield Wednesday lead during the final 16 minutes of the game.
- 16 May – A strike is called by the National Union of Seamen, ending on 29 May.
- 17 May – Bob Dylan is called "Judas" during his performance at the Manchester Free Trade Hall for performing with an electric band in the second half.
- 18 May – Home Secretary Roy Jenkins announces that the number of police forces in England and Wales will be cut to 68.
- 26 May – British Guiana achieves independence from the United Kingdom, becoming Guyana.
- 6 June – BBC One television sitcom Till Death Us Do Part begins its first series run.
- 16 June – The Beatles perform live on BBC television's Top of the Pops, the UK's major television pop music show, for the first and only time, miming to both "Paperback Writer" and its b-side, "Rain". A surviving 92-second clip is found in 2019.
- 23 June – The Beatles go on top of the British singles charts for the tenth time with "Paperback Writer".
- 29 June – Barclays introduces the Barclaycard, the first British credit card.

=== July–September ===
- 3 July
  - 31 arrests are made after a protest against the Vietnam War outside the United States Embassy in London in Grosvenor Square by around 4,000 people turns violent.
  - The Fire, Auto & Marine Insurance Company enters the liquidation process leaving 400,000 motorists uninsured. Emil Savundra will later be jailed for fraud in connection with the company's trading and collapse.
- 11 July
  - The 1966 FIFA World Cup competition, staged in England, begins.
  - British Motor Corporation and Jaguar Cars announce plans to merge as British Motor Holdings.
  - Scotsman Angus Barbieri ends a 382-day fast, during which he consumed only water, vitamins, salts, yeast and a small amount of milk and sugar, and achieved his aim of losing 276 lb (125 kg).
- 12 July – Zambia threatens to leave the Commonwealth because of British peace overtures to Rhodesia.
- 14 July – Gwynfor Evans is elected as the Member of Parliament for Carmarthen, the first ever Plaid Cymru MP, after his victory at a by-election, overturning the previous Labour majority with an 18% swing.
- 15 July – West Indian-born Asquith Xavier is appointed as a guard at Euston railway station after the opposition of the local staff committee is overturned, ending a colour bar in Euston Station that is rumoured to have been in place for the last 12 years.
- 16 July – Prime Minister Harold Wilson flies to Moscow to try to start peace negotiations over the Vietnam War. The Soviet Government rejects his ideas.
- 20 July – Start of six-month wage and price freeze.
- 22 July – Pleasure boat Prince of Wales collides with a bridge and sinks in the Mawddach Estuary, killing 15 people.
- 26 July – Lord Gardiner issues the Practice Statement in the House of Lords stating that the House, when acting in a judicial capacity, is not bound to follow its own previous precedent.
- 30 July
  - England beats West Germany 4–2 to win the 1966 World Cup at Wembley. Geoff Hurst scores a hat-trick, and Martin Peters scores the other English goal, in a game which attracts an all-time record UK television audience of more than 32 million.
  - An AEC Routemaster bus on route 7 in London catches fire near Marble Arch, but all the passengers and crew escape without injury.
- 31 July – Loss of MV Darlwyne: a pleasure cruiser disappears off the coast of Cornwall with the loss of all 31 aboard.
- 1 August
  - Everton F.C. sign Blackpool's World Cup winning midfield player Alan Ball, Jr. for a national record fee of £110,000.
  - The Colonial Office merges with the Commonwealth Relations Office to form a new Commonwealth Office.
- 2 August – The Spanish government forbids overflights by British military aircraft.
- 4 August – The Kray Twins are questioned in connection with a murder in London.
- 5 August – The Beatles release the album Revolver.
- 10 August – George Brown succeeds Michael Stewart as Foreign Secretary.
- 12 August – Shepherd's Bush murders: Three plain clothes policemen are shot dead in West London while investigating a suspicious vehicle in Braybrook Street.
- 15 August – John Whitney is arrested and charged with the Shepherd's Bush murders.
- 17 August – John Duddy is arrested in Glasgow and charged with the Shepherd's Bush murders. A third suspect is still at large.
- 18 August – Tay Road Bridge opens.
- 22 August – Centre Point, a 32-floor office building at St Giles Circus in London, designed by Richard Seifert for property speculator Harry Hyams, is completed. It remains empty for around a decade.
- 24 August – Tom Stoppard's tragicomedy Rosencrantz and Guildenstern Are Dead is first staged, at the Edinburgh Festival Fringe.
- 29 August – The Beatles play their very last concert, at Candlestick Park in San Francisco, California.
- 1 September – 98 British tourists die when Britannia Airways Flight 105 crashes in Ljubljana, Yugoslavia.
- 3 September – Barely five months after the death of Norwich City F.C. captain Barry Butler, a second Football League player this year dies in a car crash; 30-year-old John Nicholson, a Doncaster Rovers centre-half who previously played for Port Vale and Liverpool.
- 5 September – Selective Employment Tax imposed.
- 15 September – Britain's first Polaris submarine, HMS Resolution, launched at Barrow-in-Furness.
- 17 September – Oberon-class submarine HMCS Okanagan launched at Chatham Dockyard, the last warship to be built there.
- 19 September – Buster Edwards returns from Mexico to London to be arrested for involvement in the Great Train Robbery (1963).
- 27 September – British Motor Corporation makes 7,000 employees redundant.
- 30 September – The Bechuanaland Protectorate in Africa achieves independence from the UK as Botswana.

=== October–December ===
- 4 October – Basutoland becomes independent and takes the name "Lesotho".
- 18 October – The Ford Cortina Mk2 is launched.
- 20 October – In economic news, 437,229 people are reported to be unemployed in the UK – a rise of some 100,000 on last month's figures.
- 21 October – Aberfan disaster in South Wales, 144 (including 116 children) are killed by a collapsing coal spoil tip.
- 22 October
  - British double agent George Blake escapes from Wormwood Scrubs prison; he is next seen in Moscow.
  - Spain demands that the United Kingdom stop military flights to Gibraltar; the UK rejects this idea the following day.
- 25 October – Spain closes its Gibraltar border against vehicular traffic.
- 29 October – Actor William Hartnell makes his last regular appearance as the First Doctor in the concluding moments of Episode 4 of the Doctor Who serial The Tenth Planet, regenerating into the Second Doctor played by Patrick Troughton at its conclusion.
- 5 November – 38 African states demand that the United Kingdom use force against the Rhodesian government.
- 9 November – The Rootes Group launches the Hillman Hunter, a four-door family saloon to compete with the BMC Farina range, Ford Cortina and Vauxhall Victor.
- 16 November – BBC television drama Cathy Come Home, filmed in a docudrama style, is broadcast on BBC One. Viewed by a quarter of the British population, it is considered influential on public attitudes to homelessness and the related social issues it deals with. It was written by Jeremy Sandford, produced by Tony Garnett and directed by Ken Loach, with Carol White in the title role.
- 24 November
  - Unemployment sees another short rise, now standing at 531,585.
  - The Beatles begin recording sessions for their Sgt. Pepper's Lonely Hearts Club Band album at Abbey Road Studios in London.
- 30 November – Barbados achieves independence.
- 1 December – UK Prime Minister Harold Wilson and Rhodesian Prime Minister Ian Smith negotiate on board HMS Tiger in the Mediterranean Sea.
- 12 December – Harry Roberts, John Whitney and John Duddy are sentenced to life imprisonment (each with a recommended minimum of 30 years) for the Shepherd's Bush murders of three London policemen in August.
- 20 December – Harold Wilson withdraws all his previous offers to the Rhodesian government and announces that he will agree to independence for the country only after the establishment of Black majority government there.
- 22 December – Rhodesian Prime minister Ian Smith declares that he considers that Rhodesia is already a republic.
- 25 December – Marionette sci-fi series Thunderbirds airs its final episode on ITV with a Christmas special.
- 31 December – Eight paintings worth millions of pounds are stolen from Dulwich Picture Gallery in London, but are recovered locally within a week.

=== Undated ===
- 1966 GP Contract agreed.
- London School of Contemporary Dance founded.
- Mathematician Michael Atiyah wins a Fields Medal.
- The motorway network continues to grow as the existing M1, M4 (including the Severn Bridge on the border of England and Wales), and M6 motorways are expanded, and new motorways emerge in the shape of the M32 linking the M4 with Bristol, and the M74 near Hamilton in Scotland.
- Japanese manufacturer Nissan begins importing its range of Datsun branded cars to the United Kingdom.

== Publications ==
- Agatha Christie's Hercule Poirot novel Third Girl.
- Len Deighton's spy novel Billion-Dollar Brain.
- Ian Fleming's James Bond short story collection Octopussy and The Living Daylights.
- Seamus Heaney's poetry collection Death of a Naturalist.
- Alistair MacLean's spy thriller When Eight Bells Toll.
- Mary Renault's historical novel The Mask of Apollo.
- Jean Rhys's novel Wide Sargasso Sea.
- Paul Scott's novel The Jewel in the Crown, first in the Raj Quartet.
- Leslie Thomas' comic novel The Virgin Soldiers.

== Births ==
=== January–March ===
- 3 January – Martin Galway, Northern Irish composer
- 9 January – Stephen Metcalfe, English politician
- 13 January – Simon Shelton, English actor (d. 2018)
- 14 January – Rob Flello, lawyer and politician
- 25 January – Donal MacIntyre, Irish-born journalist
- 29 January – Keith Dublin, English footballer
- 31 January – Dexter Fletcher, actor and director
- 6 February – Rick Astley, British singer
- 8 February – Sarah Montague, journalist and radio host
- 18 February – Richard A. Collins, scientist and author
- 24 February – Ben Miller, English comedian, actor and director
- 25 February
  - Charlie MacEwan, British Army officer
  - Robert Napper, murderer
- 28 February – Robert Rowland, politician (died 2021)
- 1 March - Paul Hollywood, chef and television presenter
- 2 March – David Wickham, concert pianist, musical director and conductor
- 3 March – Nick Rhodes, biochemist
- 4 March
  - Patrick Hannan, English pop drummer with The Sundays
  - Wash West, English-born film director
- 6 March – Alan Davies, comedy performer
- 8 March – Gregory Barker, British Conservative politician, MP for Bexhill and Battle
- 9 March – Melanie Dawes, civil servant
- 13 March – Alastair Reynolds, science fiction author
- 17 March – Andrew Rosindell, British Conservative politician, MP for Romford
- 18 March – Joanna Cherry, Scottish politician and lawyer
- 19 March – Nigel Clough, English footballer and football manager
- 22 March – Helena Morrissey, Baroness Morrissey, financier and campaigner
- 24 March – Mark Williams, Welsh Liberal Democrat politician, Shadow Minister for Wales and MP for Ceredigion
- 25 March – Anton Rogan, Northern Irish footballer
- 26 March
  - Lilian Greenwood, British Labour politician, Chair of the Finance Committee and MP for Nottingham South
  - Nick Wirth, English engineer, founder of Wirth Research
- 30 March – Jeremy Deller, English artist
- 31 March – Roger Black, English 400 m runner

=== April–June ===
- 1 April
  - Chris Evans, broadcast music presenter
  - Sharon Hodgson, British Labour politician, MP for Gateshead East and Washington West
- 2 April – Teddy Sheringham, English footballer
- 9 April – John Hammond, weather forecaster
- 10 April – Steve Claridge, English footballer
- 11 April – Lisa Stansfield, British soul singer
- 15 April
  - Cressida Cowell, English children's author, known for novel How to Train Your Dragon
  - Samantha Fox, British model and singer
- 21 April – Chris Whitty, epidemiologist, Chief Medical Officer for England
- 29 April – Phil Tufnell, British cricketer
- 30 April – Pooky Quesnel, English actress
- 10 May – Jonathan Edwards, British athlete
- 15 May – Greg Wise, actor and producer
- 26 May
  - Helena Bonham Carter, English actress
  - Zola Budd, South African athlete
  - Shona Robison, Scottish politician
- 27 May – Heston Blumenthal, chef and food writer
- 29 May – James Richardson, television presenter and journalist
- 4 June – Bill Wiggin, British Conservative politician, Shadow Minister for Agriculture & Fisheries and MP for Leominster
- 3 June – Jonathan Shaw, British Labour politician, MP for Chatham and Aylesford
- 7 June – Mark Ravenhill, English playwright (Shopping and Fucking)
- 8 June – Doris Pearson, British musician
- 19 June – Samuel West, British actor
- 22 June – Michael Park, British rally co-driver (died 2005)
- 24 June – Lucinda Russell, Scottish racehorse trainer

=== July–September ===
- 8 July – Guto Harri, broadcaster and communications consultant
- 11 July – Melanie Appleby, singer (d. 1990)
- 12 July – Tamsin Greig, actress
- 16 July – Johnny Vaughan, journalist and critic
- 24 July – Martin Keown, footballer
- 25 July – Diana Johnson, British Labour politician, MP for Kingston upon Hull North
- 28 July – Paul Loughlin, English rugby player
- August – Simon Stevens, chief executive of NHS England
- 3 August – Thangam Debbonaire, British Labour politician, MP for Bristol West
- 7 August – David Cairns, Scottish Labour politician, Parliamentary Under-Secretary of State for Scotland and MP for Inverclyde (died 2011)
- 10 August – Charlie Dimmock, English TV gardening expert
- 12 August – Tobias Ellwood, British Conservative politician, MP for Bournemouth East
- 24 August – Nick Denton, English journalist and businessman, founder of Gawker Media
- 26 August – Shirley Manson, Scottish alternative rock singer and Garbage frontwoman
- 31 August – Alice Oswald, poet
- 7 September – Toby Jones, actor
- 22 September – Ruth Jones, Welsh actress
- 23 September – Adam Price, Welsh Plaid Cymru politician, MP for Carmarthen East and Dinefwr
- 29 September – Ben Miles, actor

=== October–December ===
- 9 October – David Cameron, British Conservative Party leader, former Prime Minister of the United Kingdom, MP for Witney and previously Leader of the Opposition.
- 10 October – Tony Adams, English footballer
- 11 October – Stephen Williams, British Liberal Democrat politician, MP for Bristol West
- 15 October – Dave Stead, English drummer
- 17 October – Mark Gatiss, English writer and actor
- 20 October – Si King, English television presenter
- 26 October – Steve Valentine, British actor
- 1 November – Jeremy Hunt, British Conservative politician, Chancellor of the Exchequer
- 8 November – Gordon Ramsay, Scottish-born chef
- 10 November
  - Vanessa Angel, English model and actress
  - Steve Mackey, English bass guitarist (died 2023)
- 14 November – Charles Hazlewood, English orchestral conductor
- 16 November – Stephen Critchlow, English actor (died 2021)
- 30 November
  - Nigel Adams, English politician
  - John Bishop, English comedian, presenter and actor
  - David Nicholls, English novelist and screenwriter
  - Andy Parsons, English comedian and writer
- 10 December
  - Dave Harold, snooker player
  - Martin Taylor, English soccer goalkeeper and coach
- 11 December – Rianna Scipio, British television host, journalist, producer and director
- 12 December – Ian Paisley Jr, Northern Irish politician
- 16 December – Dennis Wise, English footballer and football manager
- 21 December
  - Martin Bayfield, rugby player, actor and stuntman
  - Kiefer Sutherland, English-born Canadian actor
- 22 December – David Wright, British Labour politician, MP for Telford
- 25 December – Stephen Twigg, politician
- 27 December – Marianne Elliott, theatre director and producer
- 29 December – Martin Offiah, English rugby league and, briefly, rugby union footballer, active 1987–2002

=== Undated ===
- Matt Jarvis, psychologist
- Daljit Nagra, poet

== Deaths ==
- 20 January
  - George Devine, theatrical manager (born 1910)
  - Gordon Macdonald, Welsh politician, last colonial governor of Newfoundland (born 1885)
- 27 January – Ronald Armstrong-Jones, barrister (born 1899)
- 10 February – J. F. C. Fuller, army officer and strategist (born 1878)
- 18 February
  - Ivy Williams, first woman called to the English bar (born 1877)
  - Thomas Williams, 1st Baron Williams, Welsh-born politician (born 1892)
- 7 March – George Camsell, footballer (born 1902)
- 8 March – William Astor, 3rd Viscount Astor, politician (born 1907)
- 10 March – Sophie Harris, theatre and opera costume and scenic designer (born 1900)
- 11 March – Clara Rackham, women's suffrage activist (born 1875)
- 2 April – C. S. Forester, novelist (born 1899)
- 9 April – Barry Butler, footballer, car accident (born 1934)
- 10 April – Evelyn Waugh, novelist (born 1903)
- 14 May – Megan Lloyd George, Welsh politician (born 1902)
- 22 May – Tom Goddard, cricketer (born 1900)
- 27 June – Arthur Waley, orientalist (born 1889)
- 30 June – Margery Allingham, detective novelist (born 1904)
- 1 July – Pauline Boty, pop art painter (born 1938)
- 13 July – Princess Beatrice, granddaughter of Queen Victoria, married into the Spanish royal family (born 1884)
- 25 September – Billy Smart Sr., circus owner (born 1894)
- 7 October – Johnny Kidd, rock singer/songwriter, car accident (born 1935)
- 10 October – Charlotte Cooper, tennis player (born 1870)
- 26 October – Alma Cogan, pop singer (born 1932)
- 14 November – Peter Baker, soldier, author, publisher, politician and forger (born 1921)
- 14 December – Emma Dunn, actress (born 1875)
- 24 December – Sir Donald MacGillivray, Scottish colonial administrator, last governor of Malaya (born 1906)

== See also ==
- 1966 in British music
- 1966 in British television
- List of British films of 1966
