= 1966 in British radio =

This is a list of events from British radio in 1966.

== Events ==
=== January ===
- 20 January – Radio Caroline ship MV Mi Amigo loses its anchor in a storm, drifts and runs aground on the beach at Frinton-on-Sea.

=== February ===
- No events

=== March ===
- No events

=== April ===
- 17 April – The first regular stereo radio transmissions begin, on FM from the Wrotham transmitter and initially for the BBC Third Programme.

=== May ===
- 3 May – Pirate radio stations Swinging Radio England and Britain Radio commence broadcasting on AM, with a combined potential 100,000 watts, from the same ship (MV Olga Patricia) anchored off the south coast of England in international waters.

=== June ===
- 20 June – Radio City affair: Major Oliver Smedley and a team board Shivering Sands Army Fort off the Kent coast, home of Radio City (pirate radio station) (run by Reginald Calvert), to repossess a transmitter supplied but not paid for. The next day, Calvert visits Smedley's home in Saffron Walden over the issue and is shot dead in a struggle.

=== July ===
- No events

=== August ===
- No events

=== September ===
- 27 September – Irish radio personality Terry Wogan makes his debut on the BBC, broadcasting on the Light Programme.

=== October ===
- 27 October – Welsh writer and broadcaster Gwyn Thomas makes a notable tribute to the children of Aberfan following the Aberfan disaster of 21 October, broadcast across the UK on the BBC Home Service's Today morning programme.

=== November ===
- No events

=== December ===
- No events

=== Unknown ===
- Britain's first student radio station, the University of Kent's UKC Radio is founded, initially as an audio feed through the radiator system. It airs until 2006.

== Station debuts ==
- 3 May
  - Swinging Radio England (1966)
  - Britain Radio (1966–1967)
- 4 June – Radio 270 (1966–1967)
- Autumn – UKC Radio (1966–Present)

== Programme debuts ==
- 7 January (pilot); 23 April (series run) – Listen to This Space on the BBC Home Service (1966–1967)
- March –The Embassy Lark on the BBC Light Programme (1966–1968)

== Continuing radio programmes ==
=== 1940s ===
- Music While You Work (1940–1967)
- Sunday Half Hour (1940–2018)
- Desert Island Discs (1942–Present)
- Family Favourites (1945–1980)
- Down Your Way (1946–1992)
- Have A Go (1946–1967)
- Housewives' Choice (1946–1967)
- Letter from America (1946–2004)
- Woman's Hour (1946–Present)
- Twenty Questions (1947–1976)
- Any Questions? (1948–Present)
- The Dales (1948–1969)
- Billy Cotton Band Show (1949–1968)
- A Book at Bedtime (1949–Present)

=== 1950s ===
- The Archers (1950–Present)
- Listen with Mother (1950–1982)
- From Our Own Correspondent (1955–Present)
- Pick of the Pops (1955–Present)
- The Clitheroe Kid (1957–1972)
- My Word! (1957–1988)
- Test Match Special (1957–Present)
- The Today Programme (1957–Present)
- The Navy Lark (1959–1977)
- Sing Something Simple (1959–2001)
- Your Hundred Best Tunes (1959–2007)

=== 1960s ===
- Farming Today (1960–Present)
- Easy Beat (1960–1967)
- In Touch (1961–Present)
- The Men from the Ministry (1962–1977)
- I'm Sorry, I'll Read That Again (1964–1973)
- Petticoat Line (1965–1979)
- Round the Horne (1965–1968)
- The World at One (1965–Present)

== Births ==
- 19 January – Henry Naylor, comedy writer-performer and director
- 8 February – Sarah Montague, journalist and broadcast presenter
- 11 March – Paddy O'Connell, broadcast presenter
- 1 April – Chris Evans, disc jockey and television presenter
- 12 July – Tamsin Greig, actress
- 2 August – Jamie Crick, radio music presenter (died 2023)
- 25 August – Tracy-Ann Oberman, actress
- 31 August – Alice Oswald, BBC Radio 4 poet in residence
- 9 September – Nikki Bedi, née Moolgaoker, broadcast presenter
- 15 September – Claire Sturgess, disc jockey and voiceover artist
- 26 October – Judge Jules (Julius O'Riordan), dance music disc jockey and producer
- 30 November – Andy Parsons, comedy writer-performer
- 31 December – Carlos (Carl Emms), disc jockey
- Daljit Nagra, BBC Radio 4 poet in residence
- Alan Smith, radio news presenter

== Deaths ==
- 11 April – A. B. Campbell, naval officer and broadcaster (born 1881)
- 2 June – Stephen King-Hall, naval officer, politician and broadcaster (born 1893)
- 21 July – A. G. Street, broadcaster on country matters (born 1892)
- 2 December – Giles Cooper, broadcast dramatist (born 1918)

== See also ==
- 1966 in British music
- 1966 in British television
- 1966 in the United Kingdom
- List of British films of 1966
