= 1966 in British television =

This is a list of British television related events from 1966.

== Events ==
=== January ===
- 1 January – The first edition of Rugby Special is broadcast on BBC2, showing weekly highlights of rugby union matches.
- 3 January – Stop-motion children's television series Camberwick Green, first of the 'Trumptonshire' trilogy, is first shown on BBC1 as part of Watch with Mother; it is the channel's first programme to be filmed in colour (although transmitted in black and white at this time) and the first BBC programme to feature a copyright year in the end credits.
- 4 January – More than 4,000 people attend a memorial service at Westminster Abbey for the broadcaster Richard Dimbleby, who died the previous month aged 52.
- 15 January – BBC2 goes on the air in the South and West of England.
- 29 January – ITV begins showing the anthology horror series Mystery and Imagination, which features numerous adaptations of classic horror stories.

=== March ===
- 3 March – The BBC announces plans to begin broadcasting television programmes in colour from next year.
- 10 March – The Frost Report, which launches the television careers of John Cleese, Ronnie Barker and Ronnie Corbett and other writers and performers, is first broadcast on BBC1.
- 22 March – ITV launches How, the educational children's programme hosted by Jack Hargreaves and Fred Dinenage.

=== April ===
- 5 April – The Money Programme debuts on BBC2. It continues to air until 2010.
- 7 April–24 September – Weavers Green, made by Anglia Television, airs on ITV in 49 half-hour episodes twice-weekly. Based around a country veterinary practice, it is the first rural soap opera on British television and one of the first television programmes to be shot on location using videotape and outside broadcast equipment, rather than film, as has usually been the case for non-studio shooting until this point.
- 21 April – The opening of the Parliament of the United Kingdom is televised for the first time.

=== May ===
- 21 May – ITV Midlands and Northern (ABC Weekend) and ITV Southern begin broadcasting Batman, the American live-action series, starring Adam West and Burt Ward. Other ITV regions broadcast it soon afterwards, with STV first showing it on 2 July, Rediffusion (London) on 5 July, and Border on 13 August. Episodes are shown in two parts over Saturday and Sunday evenings.
- 25 May – Julie Goodyear makes her Coronation Street debut as Bet Lynch. She will become a regular character between 1970 and 1995, as well as brief returns in 2002 and 2003.

=== June ===
- 6 June – BBC1 sitcom Till Death Us Do Part begins its first series run.
- 11 June – BBC2 Northern Ireland goes on the air.
- 16 June – The Beatles perform live on BBC television's Top of the Pops. Although the group had previously pre-recorded appearances on the show, this would be their first and only live broadcast, miming to both "Paperback Writer" and its b-side, "Rain". The appearance is subsequently lost due to the BBC's habit of wiping expensive video tape for reuse, but in 2019 a collector unearths 11 seconds of the performance and a longer 92 seconds is found later in the year.

=== July ===
- 4 July – BBC2 presents Samuel Beckett's television play Eh Joe.
- 9 July – BBC2 Scotland goes on the air, the last regional area to receive BBC2 (including the Gaelic language strand BBC Dhà Alba). It ceases broadcasting on 17 February 2019 to make way for the new BBC Scotland channel launching on 24 February 2019.
- 30 July – England beat West Germany 4–2 to win the 1966 World Cup at Wembley, attracting an all-time record UK television audience of more than 32,000,000.

=== August ===
- 20 August – BBC2 begins showing a Midnight Movie on Saturday nights. The film airs through the midnight hour, offering an alternative to BBC1 and ITV as both those channels generally closed at around midnight.

=== Summer/September ===
- Summer – Patrick McGoohan quits the popular spy series Danger Man after filming only two episodes of the fourth season, in order to produce and star in The Prisoner which begins filming in September.
- 20 September – ITV begins showing the long running children's series Picture Box. Produced by Granada Television and developed as an educational programme for schools, it features a variety of subjects hosted by Alan Rothwell. It is also notable for its distinctive title sequence of a revolving glass box accompanied by merry-go-round music. Rothwell will host the series right up until 1989.

=== October ===
- 1 October – A Carry On comedy film is shown on UK television for the first time, with ITV Midlands broadcasting the first in series from 1958, Carry On Sergeant, starring William Hartnell, Bob Monkhouse, Shirley Eaton, Kenneth Connor, Charles Hawtrey and Kenneth Williams.
- 2 October
  - The four-part serial Talking to a Stranger, acclaimed as one of the finest British television dramas of the 1960s, begins transmission in the Theatre 625 strand on BBC2.
  - Thunderbirds is back with a second season on ITV but without David Holliday (the original voice of Virgil Tracy) as he is now replaced by Jeremy Wilkin and running only for six episodes (because of failure to sell to the U.S. market).
- 8 October – First episode of the Doctor Who serial The Tenth Planet aired, introducing the Cybermen.
- 29 October – Actor William Hartnell makes his last regular appearance as the First Doctor in the concluding moments of Episode 4 of the Doctor Who serial The Tenth Planet. Patrick Troughton briefly appears as the Second Doctor at the conclusion of the serial.

=== November ===
- 5 November – Patrick Troughton makes his first full Doctor Who appearance in the serial The Power of the Daleks as the Second Doctor. No episodes of this serial survive.
- 16 November – BBC television drama Cathy Come Home, filmed in a docudrama style, is broadcast on BBC1's The Wednesday Play anthology strand. Viewed by a quarter of the British population, it is considered influential on public attitudes to homelessness and the related social issues it deals with, becoming possibly the best-known play ever to be broadcast on British television. It was written by Jeremy Sandford, produced by Tony Garnett and directed by Ken Loach, with Carol White in the title role.
- 19 November - legendary comedian Arthur Haynes dies at the age of 52.

=== December ===
- 17 December – First episode of the Doctor Who serial The Highlanders is aired on BBC 1., the last to feature an historical event (the aftermath of the Battle of Culloden in 1746), although the character of Jamie is retained as a companion. No episodes of this serial survive.
- 25 December – The final episode of Thunderbirds is broadcast on ITV.
- 28 December – Jonathan Miller's production of Alice in Wonderland is broadcast on ITV.
- 31 December – BBC1 begins showing the American pop music sitcom The Monkees.

=== Undated ===
- The "Happiness is a cigar called Hamlet" campaign launches on television, running until the prohibition of tobacco product advertising on British television in 1991.

== Debuts ==
=== BBC1 ===
- 1 January – The Spies (1966)
- 3 January – The Trumptonshire Trilogy: Camberwick Green (1966)
- 5 January – Softly, Softly (1966–1969)
- 16 January – David Copperfield (1966)
- 10 March – The Frost Report (1966)
- 7 May – Quick Before They Catch Us (1966)
- 17 May – All Gas and Gaiters (1966–1971)
- 24 May – Beggar My Neighbour (1966–1968)
- 14 June – Room at the Bottom (1966)
- 19 June – Thirteen Against Fate (1966)
- 23 June – Adam Adamant Lives! (1966–1967)
- 6 July – King of the River (1966–1967)
- 2 August – The Reluctant Romeo (1966–1967)
- 7 August – It's a Knockout (BBC1 1966–1982, Channel 5 1999–2001)
- 18 August – Dusty (1966–1967)
- 5 September – Jennings (1966)
- 16 September – Foreign Affairs (1966)
- 2 October – The Woman in White (1966)
- 3 October – Joe (1966–1971)
- 15 October – The Late Show (1966–1967)
- 17 October – Daktari (1966–1969)
- 28 October – Harry Worth (1966–1970)
- 4 November – Vendetta (1966–1968)
- 13 November – The Three Musketeers (1966)
- 16 November – Cathy Come Home (1966)
- 17 November – The Illustrated Weekly Hudd (1966–1967)
- 28 December – Alice in Wonderland (1966)
- 31 December – The Monkees (broadcast on BBC1 in black & white)

=== BBC2 ===
- 7 January – This Man Craig (1966–1967)
- 11 January – The Idiot (1966)
- 15 January – The Man in the Mirror (1966)
- 15 February – A Farewell to Arms (1966)
- 26 February – A Game of Murder (1966)
- 8 March – The Hunchback of Notre Dame (1966)
- 19 March – Mild and Bitter (1966)
- 5 April – The Money Programme (1966–2010)
- 10 April – Take a Pair of Private Eyes (1966)
- 26 April – Lord Raingo (1966)
- 22 May – Death is a Good Living (1966)
- 16 June – This Is Petula Clark (1966–1968)
- 18 June – Chronicle (1966–1991)
- 19 June – Watch the Birdies (1966)
- 9 July – The Heart of Midlothian (1966)
- 23 July – Mr. John Jorrocks (1966)
- 20 September – North and South (1966)
- 2 October – Talking to a Stranger (1966) (originally shown on Theatre 625 anthology series)
- 22 October – Breaking Point (1966)
- 25 October – Broome Stages (1966)
- 9 November – On the Margin (1966)
- 26 November – Bat Out of Hell (1966)
- 31 December – The Dark Number (1966–1967)

=== ITV ===
- 7 January – The Liars (1966)
- 11 January – The Master (1966)
- 29 January – Mystery and Imagination (1966–1970)
- 2 February – The Rat Catchers (1966–1967)
- 22 February – Object Z Returns (1966)
- 14 March – Mrs Thursday (1966–1967)
- 22 March – How (1966–1981)
- 7 April – Weavers Green (1966)
- 14 April – The Untouchables (1959–1963)
- 9 May – Seven Deadly Sins (1966)
- 21 May – Batman (1966–1968)
- 18 June – Cooperama (1966)
- 7 July – You Can't Win (1966)
- 3 August – The Informer (1966–1967)
- 26 August – The Corridor People (1966)
- 20 September – Picture Box (1966–1989)
- 23 September – Conflict (1966–1969)
- 28 September – The Baron (1966–1967)
- 29 September – The New Forest Rustlers (1966)
- 1 October
  - All Square (1966–1967)
  - Intrigue (1966)
- 19 November – George and the Dragon (1966–1968)
- 31 December – Life with Cooper (1966–1969)
- Unknown – I Dream of Jeannie (1965–1970)

== Continuing television shows ==
=== 1920s ===
- BBC Wimbledon (1927–1939, 1946–2019, 2021–2024)

=== 1930s ===
- Trooping the Colour (1937–1939, 1946–2019, 2023–present)
- The Boat Race (1938–1939, 1946–2019, 2021–present)
- BBC Cricket (1939, 1946–1999, 2020–2024)

=== 1940s ===
- The Ed Sullivan Show (1948–1971)
- Come Dancing (1949–1998)

=== 1950s ===
- Andy Pandy (1950–1970, 2002–2005)
- Watch with Mother (1952–1975)
- The Good Old Days (1953–1983)
- Panorama (1953–present)
- Sunday Night at the London Palladium (1955–1967, 1973–1974)
- Take Your Pick! (1955–1968, 1992–1998)
- Double Your Money (1955–1968)
- Dixon of Dock Green (1955–1976)
- Crackerjack (1955–1970, 1972–1984, 2020–2021)
- ITV Wimbledon (1956–1968)
- Opportunity Knocks (1956–1978, 1987–1990)
- This Week (1956–1978, 1986–1992)
- Armchair Theatre (1956–1974)
- What the Papers Say (1956–2008)
- The Sky at Night (1957–present)
- Blue Peter (1958–present)
- Grandstand (1958–2007)

=== 1960s ===
- Coronation Street (1960–present)
- The Avengers (1961–1969)
- Songs of Praise (1961–present)
- Hugh and I (1962–1967)
- The Saint (1962–1969)
- Z-Cars (1962–1978)
- Animal Magic (1962–1983)
- Doctor Who (1963–1989, 1996, 2005–present)
- World in Action (1963–1998)
- The Wednesday Play (1964–1970)
- Top of the Pops (1964–2006)
- Match of the Day (1964–present)
- Crossroads (1964–1988, 2001–2003)
- Play School (1964–1988)
- Mr. and Mrs. (1965–1999)
- The Newcomers (1965–1969)
- Not Only... But Also (1965–1970)
- World of Sport (1965–1985)
- Call My Bluff (1965–2005)
- Jackanory (1965–1996, 2006)

== Ending this year ==
- Captain Pugwash (1957–1966, 1974–1975, 1997–2002)
- The Flintstones (1960–1966)
- Thank Your Lucky Stars (1961–1966)
- Marriage Lines (1963–1966)
- Our Man at St. Mark's (1963–1966)
- Ready Steady Go! (1963–1966)
- The Likely Lads (1964–1966)
- Redcap (1964–1966)
- BBC-3 (1965–1966)
- The Bed-Sit Girl (1965–1966)
- Thunderbirds (1965–1966)
- Stingray (1965–1966)

== Births ==
- 13 January – Shelagh Fogarty, radio and television presenter
- 26 February – Fay Ripley, actress and recipe author
- 6 March – Alan Davies, comedian and actor
- 22 March – Samantha Robson, actress
- 1 April – Chris Evans, radio DJ and presenter
- 14 April – Lloyd Owen, actor
- 14 June – Jeremy Dyson, English screenwriter (The League of Gentlemen)
- 19 June – Samuel West, actor
- 5 July – Susannah Doyle, actress, playwright and film director
- 12 July – Tamsin Greig, actress
- 16 July – Johnny Vaughan, broadcaster and journalist
- 23 July – Samantha Beckinsale, actress
- 30 August – Helen Fospero, newsreader and journalist
- 17 October – Mark Gatiss, English actor, writer and comedian (The League of Gentlemen)
- 26 October – Steve Valentine, actor

== See also ==
- 1966 in British music
- 1966 in British radio
- 1966 in the United Kingdom
- List of British films of 1966
