= Deadmeat (film) =

2007 UK film by Q

- Promotional poster
- Directed by: Q
- Written by: Q
- Based on: Deadmeat novel
- Produced by: Q Candice Vetter
- Starring: Q Jo Martin; Martina Laird; Clare Perkins
- Cinematography: Damian Paul Daniel; Christopher Ross
- Edited by: Alan Andrews; Jim Bambrick; Eddie Hamilton; Peter Davies
- Music by: Haydn Bendall; Duncan Bridgeman; Ronnie Wilson
- Production company: Deadmeat Productions
- Distributed by: Top Dog
- Release date: 13 September 2007 (United Kingdom)
- Running time: 82 minutes
- Country: United Kingdom
- Language: English

Deadmeat is a 2007 British urban crime drama thriller film written, directed, produced by, and starring Q, aka Kwabena Manso. The film is about a man who has just been released from prison and sets out to exact violent revenge against the gang who murdered his brother.

== Plot ==
Clarkie has just been released from prison and is staying in Notting Hill with his elder brother Bones, an Internet painting artist and entrepreneur, and his brother's girlfriend, Melanie, the lawyer who defended Clarkie. Froggy, a friend of the two brothers and Bone's best friend, tells Clarkie that Melanie and Bones set him up to go to prison. Froggy regularly visited Clarkie in prison but Bones did not visit him once. Clarkie is having an affair with Melanie, which Bones finds about after he proposes to Melanie.

Whilst news is reported about an American serial killer, Bones is found dead in his flat, having apparently hung himself, the death is subsequently attached to "The Cyber Vigilante", whose victims are suspected paedophiles. Clarkie is not convinced Bones killed himself nor does he believe that he was a paedophile consequently killed by a cyber-vigilante. Despite the animosity between the brothers before Bone died, Clarkie embarks on a mission to solve his brother's murder, clear his brother's name and exact revenge on the true culprit of the killing.

Four Years Later... Melanie who is now heavily pregnant tracks down Clarkie, who is living in Woolwich with his new South African, hacker girlfriend Symone. Melanie gives him evidence that someone was trying to frame Bones. Clarkie believes Froggy was the paedophile who tried to frame Bones by stealing is identity and making the cyber-vigilante track Bones down. When Clarkie accuses Froggy of stealing his brother's identity, Froggy denies Clarkie's allegations of paedophilia. With Symone's help, Clarkie tracks down the father of a child Froggy had been grooming and gets the child's confession as well as his sister's testimony on camera.

Clarkie travels to Cricklewood to search for Froggy. With the help of an old friend Yang, Clarkie is led to JJ, a photographer who is helping Froggy customise his car, and Clarkie tells him to let Froggy know that he is looking for him. An undercover policewoman, Sarah, posing as a model tells Clarkie to follow Jamal and he will find Froggy.

Clarkie buys a sniper gun from Yang, bids farewell to Symone who is leaving for South Africa, drives to a parking lot rooftop, tracks Froggy and takes his revenge by fatally shooting Froggy, JJ and another gang member while they were in Froggy's car. Clarkie then fails an attempt at a drive-by shooting on another passenger, a 14-year-old boy Jamal, but he cannot bring himself to kill a teenager. Clarkie then obtains a fake passport from a friend and plans to board a plane for South Africa that evening.

A detective, Clayderman, starts her investigation into the triple murder by questioning Jamal who witnessed the incident. Meanwhile, Barry and Stan wait for Castro's gang and Maloney's gang to enter a shop, along with Sarah, who is infiltrating Castro's gang. While they perform an armed robbery, Barry shoots Castro, Patrick Maloney and their other gang members, and Stan shoots Barry. Clayderman removes undercover officers, Stan and Sarah, from the investigation for being caught up in the shop robbery.

Jamal reveals that he has been working as a courier for Castro and Maloney. Clayderman and Bernard Boston suspect Castro and Maloney have been using drugs as a cover to also transport arms and then to plant bombs. The boy is kidnapped by a hybrid terrorist cell, IR-Keyda, an African American member reveals that the bombs will be set off every hour. Clayderman contacts the Prime Minister to let him know that the IRA and al-Qaeda have joined forces or formed splinter group and planted bombs, which are due to go off. The Prime Minister informs emergency services and heads of state, and arranges a meeting with cabinet ministers informing them that bombs have been located in London.

After gang leader, De Costa, identifies her cousin Barry's body, she tells her henchman, Cory, that she asked Barry to put a hit on Castro but knew he did not go to do it alone as he loved company. De Costa questions the shopkeeper and finds out that a policeman has been let into their gang. She arranges a meeting with the gang and gang member, Danny, admits to letting Stan into their gang but claims he did not know that he was a policeman. De Costa orders Cory to shoot Danny and to frame Danny's girlfriend, Michelle, with his murder.

Later that evening, Clayderman questions Clarkie about a black 4x4 seen leaving the scene of the shooting and Clarkie's car was seen driving down the road of Jamal, the main witness. After Clarkie replies that he is not the only person that drives a 4x4 and that he sold his car to someone local, Clayderman states that his car has been impounded for forensics to match the tyres with fragments found on the parking lot rooftop, but does not arrest Clarkie.

== Cast ==
- Q as Clarkie
- Jo Martin as Melanie
- Martina Laird as Detective Clayderman
- Clare Perkins as De Costa
- Robbie Gee as Stan
- Brian Bovell as Bones
- Roger Griffiths as Froggy
- Sabrina Chyld as Sarah
- Wil Johnson as Barry
- Geff Francis as Bernard Boston
- Oscar James as Detective Peters
- Cyril Nri as Prime Minister
- Roger Griffiths as Froggy
- Rianna Scipio as News Reporter

== Production ==
The story is adapted from Q's best-selling novel Deadmeat. Which he originally sold out of the boot of his car and at nightclubs before it was picked up by a major UK publisher. It has sold over 20,000 copies.

The film was shot on 35mm film with anamorphic lenses from Clarkie's perspective and relies on narration in the main. It was shot in 12 days on a low budget with a cast of Black British actors. A "Hollywood" ending to the film was shot, however, it was left out of the film by Q "because, there are always unanswered questions, especially in the area of unsolved crimes."

== Release ==
On 13 September 2007, the film was released at UK cinemas. The film sold out in under three weeks at screenings at the Tricycle cinema in Kilburn, London.

On 7 March 2011, the DVD of the film was released.

== Reception ==
Danielle Lee of Reviewed Online said of the film "any physical cracks in the film is healed by the high standard of acting. Some of the outdoor scenes were drowned out by traffic or other background noise which would usually be phased out by the high rollers... The film is marred slightly by the lack of exposition and the abrupt ending typically leaves a lot of questions unanswered."

Shadow And Act said that "Deadmeat makes no bones about being pure fictional entertainment that might appeal to both a youth audience as well as those who've exited their 20s and beyond...Deadmeat isn't a film about keepin' it real, so much as keeping it reel entertaining."

Dave Roper of Hey U Guys called the film "a ghastly, incoherent, shambolic mess." Total Film described the film as a "bewildering North london gangster flick involves writer/director/star/novelist 'Q' unhappily shoehorning his book into a strange 80 minutes of humdrum exposition and lost plotlines. Paedophiles, terrorists and motiveless murders add to the nonsense."

Fiona McKinson of EURWeb said of the film "the initial scenes use pieces to camera and poetry, which creates an ethereal quality, though this is not sustained throughout the film." California News described the film as "Slam-Bang Cliffhanger action," Screen Nation added: "...that never lets up - Terrific." Hollywood Independent called it "awesome."

In 2007, Idris Elba handed Q the award for the Best British Feature at the Black Film Makers' International Film Festival.

== Awards and nominations ==
| Year | Award | Category | Result |
|---|---|---|---|
| 2007 | American Black Film Festival | Official Selection | Nominated |
| 2007 | Black Film Makers' International Film Festival | Best British Feature | Won |
| 2007 | The Accolade | Award for Excellence | Won |
| 2007 | Pan-African Film Festival | Best Director of a First Feature | Nominated |

== See also ==
- Black British
- Fedz
- List of hood films
