= NFL on Sky Sports =

National Football League television series, broadcast on Sky Sports

- Also known as: NFL Special
- Presented by: Neil Reynolds
- Starring: Jason Bell; Phoebe Schecter; Ndamukong Suh; Bridget Condon
- Opening theme: NFL on Fox (Scott Schreer, 2013–2018); Wardance (John Ross, 2019–present)
- Country of origin: United Kingdom

Production
- Camera setup: Multi-camera
- Running time: Variable

Original release
- Network: Sky Sports
- Release: 1995 – present

NFL on Sky Sports, previously known as NFL Special, is Sky Sports' flagship live American football programme, broadcasting live National Football League over the course of a season. It is normally broadcast on Sky Sports Main Event or Sky Sports NFL, with NFL RedZone being shown every regular season Sunday on Sky Sports Mix. As of 2026, they show every Thursday night, Sunday night and Monday night game live, as well as most international and Sunday evening games, alongside at least 2 Sunday afternoon games each gameweek.

As of the 2026 season, the show is presented by Neil Reynolds, with Jason Bell, Phoebe Schecter, Ndamukong Suh and Bridget Condon as regular co-analysts.

== Broadcast times ==
As of the 2026 season, NFL on Sky Sports airs Thursday Night Football, multiple games on a Sunday evening (kicking off at 18:00 & 21:05/21:25), NBC Sunday Night Football (at 1:20 on Monday morning), and Monday Night Football on Tuesday at 1:15. Highlights from NFL RedZone, which is broadcast on Sky Sports Mix, are shown and commented on by Reynolds and his analysts. An additional international game on Sunday may also be shown in the afternoon.

Until 2015, the programme aired all of the NFL London Games games live from Wembley Stadium, and also offered exclusive live coverage of the playoffs and live coverage of the Super Bowl. Since 2015, they only air a minimum of two London Games, coverage being shared with the BBC. As of the 2019 season, Sky Sports have exclusive coverage of both London Games at Tottenham Hotspur Stadium and the playoffs, whilst live coverage of the Super Bowl is available on both Sky Sports and BBC Sport in the UK.

From the 2015 season, Sky Sports secured live coverage of NBC's Sunday Night Football coverage and ESPN's Monday Night Football, giving Sky live rights to every NFL game during the season for the first time ever. Similarly to Thursday Night Football, Sky Sports uses feeds from the American network to cover the late night Sunday game and the Monday game.

In August 2020, it was confirmed that Sky and the NFL has agreed a new five-year partnership which would see them continue to broadcast games until the end of the 2024 season. It was also confirmed Sky Sports NFL, an in-season rebrand of Sky Sports Action would launch on 3 September 2020.

== On-screen Team ==
It had been presented since its debut by Kevin Cadle, being joined until 2011 by Nick Halling. Neil Reynolds then replaced Halling, and provided analysis alongside a guest analyst. Shaun Gayle is the primary guest analyst during the regular season from September to December, and Jeff Reinebold typically takes over from Gayle as primary analyst during the latter stages of the regular season and the playoffs. Cecil Martin previously served as analyst before being replaced by Gayle for the 2014 season. Previous analysts such as Daryl Johnston and Bradlee Van Pelt have also provided analysis for Sky Sports. However at the start of the 2016–17 season Cadle announced that he would no longer present the show however he would make occasional appearances, with Dara Kennedy taking over as host. To start the 2017–18 season Reynolds replaced Kennedy as host, and had Shaun Gayle and Corey Wootton as co-analysts. On 16 October 2017 it was announced that the long-time NFL show presenter Cadle had died at the age of 62.

Reynolds is often joined by guest analysts, such as Rob Ryan, Solomon Wilcots and DeMarcus Ware. In addition, throughout the coverage, Reynolds and the panel will discuss the games through video call with the Around the NFL Podcast Team, including Dan Hanzus, Gregg Rosenthal, Marc Sessler; and journalist Peter King.

=== Presenters ===
- 1995–2016: Kevin Cadle
- 1996–2011: Nick Halling
- 2011–present: Neil Reynolds
- 2015–2016: Dara Kennedy

== Commentators ==
NFL on Sky Sports will use the commentary teams from the American networks for the 2026 NFL season including the likes of Al Michaels and Kirk Herbstreit (Amazon Prime Video), Jim Nantz and J.J. Watt (CBS), Kevin Burkhardt and Tom Brady (Fox), Mike Tirico and Cris Collinsworth (NBC) and Joe Buck and Troy Aikman (ESPN).

== Production ==
Between 2013 and 2018, NFL on Sky Sports regularly used elements of U.S. broadcaster Fox Sports' presentation including the theme song, composed by Scott Schreer, and the Cleatus the Robot mascot. 21st Century Fox owned Fox Sports and held a controlling share in Sky during this period. After Sky had been sold to Comcast, the programme's theme music became "Wardance" composed by John Ross. The programme is typically produced from Sky Studios in Osterley. For the Super Bowl, Reynolds and his co-analysts broadcast live from the stadium.

== See also ==
- Timeline of American Football on UK television
