= Matthew Jarvis =

Matthew Jarvis may refer to:

- Matt Jarvis (born 1986), English association football player
- Matthew Jarvis (poker player), Canadian poker player
- Matt Jarvis (psychologist) (born 1966), psychology education lecturer at Keele University
- Matthew Jarvis (rugby union) (born 1990), Welsh rugby union player
