= Nick Rhodes (disambiguation) =

Nick Rhodes (born 1962) is an English musician.

Nick or Nicholas Rhodes may also refer to:

- Nick Rhodes (biochemist) (born 1966), academic at the University of Liverpool
- Nicholas Rhodes (1946–2011), British numismatist
