= Martina Laird =

Trinidadian actress, director and acting teacher (born 1971)

- Born: 1971 (age 54–55); Port of Spain, Trinidad
- Education: University of Kent at Canterbury; Webber Douglas Academy of Dramatic Art
- Occupations: Actress, director, acting teacher
- Years active: 1993–present
- Website: www.martinalaird.com

Martina Laird (born 1971) is a Trinidadian British actress of stage, film and television.

== Early life and education ==
Martina Laird was born in 1971 in Port of Spain, Trinidad. Her interest in drama began early, when she was seven years old, and from the age of 13 she studied with such local luminaries as Beryl McBurnie, and regularly attended performances at the Little Carib Theatre.

At the age of 17, Laird went to the United Kingdom, having won a national scholarship to study French at the University of Kent at Canterbury, and she did drama as part of her degree course. Having told her parents of her acting ambitions at the age of 20, on the advice of Derek Walcott, who was a family friend, Laird went on to attend the Webber Douglas Academy of Dramatic Art.

== Career ==
After beginning her acting career on the stage, she landed a role in the BBC TV drama series Casualty, most memorably playing the character Comfort for several years. She also featured in other popular television series, including Holby City and EastEnders.

Among her notable stage credits are as Sophia in Errol John's Moon on a Rainbow Shawl, directed by Michael Buffong, in a 2012 production at the Royal National Theatre, and Marcus Gardley's The House that Will Not Stand at the Tricycle Theatre (2014), directed by Indhu Rubasingham.

Laird performed in seven Shakespeare plays over two years in 2016 and 2017: The Taming of the Shrew, Romeo and Juliet, Julius Caesar, The Tempest, Henry IV, Coriolanus, and All's Well That Ends Well.

In 2019, Laird appeared in the August Wilson play King Hedley II, alongside Lenny Henry, at the Theatre Royal Stratford East.

In October 2023, she featured in a revival of Mustapha Matura's play Meetings at the Orange Tree Theatre, directed by Kalungi Ssebandeke.

Laird made her writing debut with the play Driftwood, first produced in the Royal Shakespeare Company's 2025–26 season at The Other Place. Described by writer and interdisiplinary researcher Desirée Baptiste as "brilliantly written", Driftwood went on to a further production at the Kiln Theatre.

== Awards ==
Laird has won a Screen Nation Award and a Michael Elliot Trust Award. Driftwood was the runner-up for the 2024 Verity Bargate Award.

== Filmography ==
Year	Title	Role	Notes
1991	EastEnders	Court Clerk	Episode: 14th Jan 1993 Trial of Nick Cotton
1993	Harry	Friend	Series 1, Episode 5
1993–1999	The Bill	Sandra Newton / Marlene Franklin / Marcia Walsh	3 episodes
1995	The Governor	Zania	3 episodes
1995	One for the Road	Ruth	Episode: "Prague"
1995, 1999, 2001-2006, 2016	Casualty	Pauline / Darleen Devern / Comfort Jones / Comfort Newton	207 episodes
1996	The Knock	Nadine Charles	Series 2, Episode 2
1996	Thief Takers	Ruth	Episode: "Wasteland"
1996	Dangerfield	WPC	Episode: "Inside Out"
1998	Peak Practice	Dr. Toray	
1998	Jonathan Creek	Bridget	Episode: "Danse Macabre"
1999	Wing and a Prayer	Dee Dee Bastiani	3 episodes
1999–2000	A Touch of Frost	Miriam Madikane	Episodes: "Line of Fire (Parts 1&2)"
1999–2005	Holby City	Comfort Newton / Darleen Devern	3 episodes
2000, 2011	My Family	Darci / Doctor Kelly	
2003	Children in Need	Comfort	Series 1, Episode 4
2005	Casualty@Holby City	Comfort Newton	5 episodes
2007	Deadmeat	Detective Clayderman	
2009	Free Agents		Series 1, Episode 6
2009	Monday Monday		
2010	Shameless	Michelle	2 episodes
2010	Missing	Pamela Rutter	Series 2, Episode 3
2010	Doctors	Kathy Nicholls	Episode: "Like Mothers, Like Daughters"
2010	Forget Me Not	Doctor	
2011	Coronation Street	Colette Hankinson	
2011	Blitz	Forensic Officer	
2011	London's Burning	Rachel	TV movie
2013	Feds	Coach McKenzie	
2015	The Dumping Ground	Mrs Underwood	
2016	Jericho	Epiphany	8 episodes
2016	EastEnders	DC Angie Rice	8 episodes
2017	Padlock	Natasha	Short film
2017–2018	The Donmar Warehouse's All-Female Shakespeare Trilogy	Alonso / Worcester / Gadshill / Cassius	
2019	Shakespeare & Hathaway: Private Investigators	Claudia Farrel	
2019	Great Performances	Cassius	
2019	The Bay (TV series)	Bernie Chambers	TV series
2020	Summerland	Older Vera	
2021	Boxing Day	Janet	
2021	Still We Thrive		Short film
2023	Unforgotten	Ebele Falade	Series 5, episode 1
2023	The Little Mermaid	Lashana	
2023	Dreamland	Diane	TV series
2023	A Pinch Of Portugal	Marissa	TV movie

=== Theatre ===
- The White Devil, Royal Shakespeare Company, 1996
- Three Hours After Marriage, Royal Shakespeare Company, 1996–1997
- Troilus and Cressida, Royal Shakespeare Company, 1996–1997
- Breath Boom, Royal Court Theatre, 2000
- The Five Wives of Maurice Pinder, Royal National Theatre, 2007
- Bianca in Othello, Donmar Warehouse, London, 2007–2008
- Moon on a Rainbow Shawl, Royal National Theatre, 2012
- The House that Will Not Stand, Tricycle Theatre, 2014
- All's Well That Ends Well, Sam Wanamaker Playhouse, 2018
- Shebeen, Stratford East, 2018
- King Hedley II, Stratford East, 2019
- 15 Heroines, Jermyn Street Theatre, 2020
- Meetings, by Mustapha Matura, Orange Tree Theatre, 2023.
