= Timeline of American Football on UK television =

This is a timeline of United Kingdom television coverage of American football. The timeline begins when the sport first received regular coverage as prior to 1982, coverage was ad-hoc and was only seen very rarely in the UK.

== 1980s ==
- 1982
  - 7 November – Coverage of American sport gets its first regular coverage on UK television when Channel 4 starts broadcasting American football on a weekly basis. Weekly highlights of the NFL are shown each Sunday teatime. Prior to this, American football was occasionally shown on ITV's World of Sport.
- 1983
  - 30 January – Live American football is seen in the UK for the first time when Channel 4 broadcasts live coverage of Super Bowl XVII.
- 1984
  - 29 March – Screensport launches and coverage of American football is a significant part of its output throughout its time on air.
- 1985
  - No events.
- 1986
  - No events.
- 1987
  - Autumn – As part of its newly launched overnight schedule, London Weekend Television shows late night highlights of American sport, including college football. The coverage is also broadcast on Anglia Television due to Anglia simulcasting LWT's overnight schedule. The coverage ends approximately a year later.
- 1988
  - No events.
- 1989
  - No events.

== 1990s ==
- 1990
  - No events.
- 1991
  - Spring – Sky Sports shows live coverage of the newly created World League of American Football. Channel 4 also covers the competition with a weekly Saturday morning highlights programme.
- 1992
  - No events.
- 1993
  - No events.
- 1994
  - No events.
- 1995
  - Sky Sports broadcasts the NFL for the first time.
  - 8 April – After a three-year hiatus, the World League of American Football returns with live coverage being aired on Sky Sports. Highlights of Scottish Claymores matches are shown on STV.
- 1996
  - No events.
- 1997
  - 31 March – On its first night on air, Channel 5 launches its overnight weekday live and recorded coverage of American sports.
- 1998
  - 25 January – Channel 4 ends its coverage of American football when it shows Super Bowl XXXII. This ends a relationship with the sport that had existed since Channel 4's first week on air.
  - September – Channel 5 becomes the new home of terrestrial coverage of the NFL.
- 1999
  - No events.

== 2000s ==
- 2000
  - No events.
- 2001
  - No events.
- 2002
  - 5 December – NASN launches to show live and recorded coverage of North American sports.
- 2003
  - No events.
- 2004
  - 1 February – Channel 5's first spell of providing regular coverage of the NFL ends with its live coverage of Super Bowl XXXVIII.
- 2005
  - January – ITV broadcasts American football for the first time when it shows the play-offs and the Super Bowl. ITV also broadcasts these events in 2006 and 2007 until the rights move to the BBC in 2008.
- 2006
  - No events.
- 2007
  - March – ESPN buys NASN and the purchase sees the return of ESPN's flagship magazine shows, such as Baseball Tonight, Around the Horn, The Sports Reporters and Pardon the Interruption, which had not been shown since the previous year after the contract between NASN and ESPN ended.
  - September –
    - The BBC shows coverage of the NFL for the first time.
    - Channel 5 returns to NFL coverage when it signs a two-year deal to broadcast NBC Sunday Night Football and Monday Night Football.
- 2008
  - No events.
- 2009
  - 1 February – NASN is renamed ESPN America following the sale in late 2006 of the channel to ESPN.

== 2010s ==
- 2010
  - 1 March – A European edition of SportsCenter starts to be broadcast five nights a week on ESPN America. The programme includes full coverage of news and action from the NFL and the NCAA.
  - Channel 5 ends its live overnight coverage of American sport, when it decides not to continue its coverage of American football. This brings to an end its coverage of American sport which had been a mainstay of Channel 5's weeknight overnight programming since the channel's launch.
  - 21 June – ESPN America begins broadcasting in high definition.
  - September – American football returns to Channel 4 after more than a decade when the channel starts broadcasting the Sunday Night Football match.
  - 14 September – ESPN UK starts broadcasting live coverage of all of the National Football League's Monday night matches as well as the 90-minute pre-game programme, Monday Night Countdown.
- 2011
  - No events.
- 2012
  - April – ESPN America stops broadcasting a European version of SportsCentre, instead opting to broadcast an edited version of the 2am show produced in Los Angeles.
  - September – The BBC broadcasts Monday Night Football but does so for just one season as for the 2013/14 season, terrestrial coverage of the NFL moves to Channel 4.
- 2013
  - 1 August – BT Sport launches and the channel's output includes extensive coverage of the College Football season. As well as extensive live coverage, college football programming also includes various ESPN-produced College football magazine shows such as College Gameday and College Football Final via a long-term agreement with ESPN to carry its original programming (including original documentaries and studio programmes), and events whose international rights are owned by ESPN International.
  - 8 September – Channel 4's American football coverage expands when it signs a new two-year deal with the NFL to become the terrestrial home to the game for the next two seasons. The deal sees the return of the Super Bowl to Channel 4, 16 years after it had last shown the event.
  - 9 September – Eurosport becomes the new broadcast of the NFL's Monday Night Football. Eurosport broadcasts the weekly game for the next two seasons.
- 2014
  - No events.
- 2015
  - Sky Sports secures live coverage of NBC's Sunday Night Football coverage and ESPN's Monday Night Football, giving Sky live rights to every NFL game during the season for the first time.
  - 9 September – The BBC announces that the NFL will return to its screens after Channel 4 opted not to renew its rights from the 2015 season after failing to reach a deal with the NFL. The deal includes the rights to show the NFL London Games live with at least one match being exclusively live. The BBC also show weekly highlights and magazine shows, which starts in November. The deal included live television, radio and online rights to screen the Super Bowl alongside Sky Sports.
- 2016
  - No events.
- 2017
  - No events.
- 2018
  - No events.
- 2019
  - No events.

== 2020s ==
- 2020
  - 3 September – Sky Sports NFL launches. It is an in-season rebrand of Sky Sports Action and provides round-the clock coverage of the NFL. As well as live and recorded coverage of games, output includes simulcasts of magazine shows from NFL Network such as Good Morning Football and NFL Total Access. The channel broadcasts until early February 2021. This has been repeated in subsequent years.
  - 14 September – Channel 5 resumes its coverage of the NFL when it starts showing the weekly Monday night game plus a weekly highlights show.
- 2021
  - No events.
- 2022
  - September – Sky Sports begins showing coverage of Notre Dame Fighting Irish home games, sublicensed from NBC Sports (a corporate sibling via Sky parent company Comcast).
  - 9 September – After seven years on the BBC, terrestrial coverage of the NFL returns to ITV. The deal includes the rights to show two of the three NFL London Games and the Super Bowl in addition to a weekly highlights programme.
- 2023
  - 18 November – Sky Sports announces an agreement to begin carrying a package of ESPN College Football broadcasts through the 2023 and 2024 seasons on Sky Sports NFL, as part of an agreement with ESPN International. The package included three regular season games per-week from games it holds rights to, and the College Football Playoff. The package was bundled with rights to ESPN's college basketball coverage, including its international rights to the NCAA tournaments.
- 2024
  - ITV cancels its NFL highlights programme shortly before the start of the NFL season but continues to show their two London games and the Super Bowl.
- 2025
  - August – The NFL announces new British television deals with 5 and Sky Sports for the 2025 season:
    - 5 and 5Action carry a weekly doubleheader of Sunday afternoon games, as well as the NFL International Series fixtures in London and Dublin, three playoff games, and the Super Bowl. The early game would feature a wraparound studio programme known as NFL Big Game Night, which features entertainment elements such as celebrity guests and game show segments.
    - Sky Sports renewed its existing contract for three more seasons, maintaining most of its existing coverage while also adding rights to additional Sunday afternoon games per-week, and rights to all International Series games hosted in Europe.
  - 29 August – Rights to ESPN's college football coverage moves to DAZN as part of a wider agreement also covering parts of Europe, MENA, and the Philippines.
  - 11 October – DAZN announces agreements with the Big Ten Conference and Fox Sports, holding international rights to all Big Ten football and basketball games, as well as rights to Fox coverage of the Big 12 and Mountain West conferences.

== See also ==
- Timeline of American sport on UK television
- Sports broadcasting contracts in the United Kingdom
