= 1966 in British music =

This is a summary of 1966 in music in the United Kingdom.

== Events ==
- 14 January – Young singer David Jones changes his last name to Bowie to avoid confusion with Davy Jones (later of the Monkees).
- 19 January – Michael Tippett conducts the premiere performance of his cantata The Vision of St Augustine in London.
- 6 February – The Animals appear a fifth time on The Ed Sullivan Show to perform their iconic Vietnam anthem hit "We Gotta Get Out of this Place".
- 4 March – The Beatles' John Lennon is quoted in The Evening Standard as saying that the band is now more popular than Jesus. In August, following publication of this remark in Datebook, there are Beatles protests and record burnings in the Southern US's Bible Belt.
- 5 March – The UK's Kenneth McKellar, singing "A Man Without Love", finishes 9th in the 11th Eurovision Song Contest (staged in Luxembourg), which is won by Udo Jürgens of Austria.
- 6 March – In the UK, 5,000 fans of the Beatles sign a petition urging British Prime minister Harold Wilson to reopen Liverpool's Cavern Club.
- 16 April – Disc Weekly is incorporated with Music Echo magazine.
- 1 May – The Beatles, The Rolling Stones and the Who perform at the New Musical Express' poll winners' show in London. The show is televised, but The Beatles' and The Stones' segments are omitted because of union conflicts.
- 13 May – The Rolling Stones release "Paint It Black", which becomes the first number one hit single in the US and UK to feature a sitar (in this case played by Brian Jones).
- 17 May – American singer Bob Dylan and the Hawks (later The Band) perform at the Free Trade Hall, Manchester. Dylan is booed by the audience because of his decision to tour with an electric band, the boos culminating in the famous "Judas" shout.
- 16 June – The Beatles appear live on BBC-TV's Top of the Pops, performing "Paperback Writer" and "Rain", the band's latest single release. This is The Beatles' one and only live appearance on Top of the Pops, and their first live television appearance in the U.K. since appearing on ABC-TV's Blackpool Night Out in July 1965. No known video recording of the Top of the Pops transmission exists.
- 2 July – The Beatles become the first musical group to perform at the Nippon Budokan Hall in Tokyo. The performance ignites protests from local citizens who feel it inappropriate for a rock and roll band to play at Budokan, a place – until then – designated to the practice of martial arts.
- 5 August – The Beatles' seventh studio album, Revolver, is released in the United Kingdom on the same day as a double-A sided single taken from the album, "Eleanor Rigby"/"Yellow Submarine", is also issued for the first time.
- 11 August – John Lennon holds a press conference in Chicago, Illinois to apologize for his remarks the previous March. "I suppose if I had said television was more popular than Jesus, I would have gotten away with it. I'm sorry I opened my mouth. I'm not anti-God, anti-Christ, or anti-religion. I was not knocking it. I was not saying we are greater or better."
- 29 August – The Beatles perform their last official concert at Candlestick Park in San Francisco, California.
- 16 September – Eric Burdon records a solo album after leaving The Animals and appears on "Ready, Steady, Go", singing "Help Me Girl", a UK No.14 solo hit. Also on the show are Otis Redding and Chris Farlowe.
- 9 November – John Lennon meets Yoko Ono when he attends a preview of her art exhibition at the Indica Gallery in London.
- 9 December – The Who release their second album, A Quick One, with a nine-minute "mini-opera" "A Quick One While He's Away".
- 16 December – The Jimi Hendrix Experience release their first single in the UK, "Hey Joe".

== Charts ==
- See UK No.1 Hits of 1966

== Classical music ==
=== New works ===
- Malcolm Arnold – Fantasy for solo flute
- Christopher Headington – Adagio and Capriccio for viola and piano
- Alun Hoddinott – Piano Concerto No. 3
- Michael Hurd – Jonah-Man Jazz (pop cantata)
- Thea Musgrave – Chamber Concerto No. 2
- John Tavener – The Whale (cantata)
- William Walton – Missa brevis for chorus and organ

=== Opera ===
- Benjamin Britten –
  - The Burning Fiery Furnace
  - The Golden Vanity for 5 boy soloists, treble choir and piano
- Grace Williams – The Parlour

== Film and Incidental music ==
- Don Banks – The Reptile.
- John Barry – Born Free.
- Richard Rodney Bennett – The Witches, starring Joan Fontaine.
- John Dankworth – Morgan – A Suitable Case for Treatment, starring David Warner and Vanessa Redgrave.
- Eric Rogers – Carry On Screaming!, starring Kenneth Williams, Jim Dale, Charles Hawtrey and Joan Sims.

== Musical theatre ==
- Come Spy with Me – music and lyrics by Bryan Blackburn (premièred on 31 May, starring Danny La Rue)
- Jorrocks (the Happiest Man Alive) – music and lyrics by David Heneker and book by Beverley Cross (premièred on 22 September, starring Joss Ackland and Cheryl Kennedy)
- On the Level – music by Ron Grainer, book and lyrics by Ronald Millar (premièred on 19 April, starring Gary Bond and Angela Richards)
- The Matchgirls – music by Tony Russell, book and lyrics by Bill Owen (premièred on 1 March)

== Musical films ==
- Dateline Diamonds, starring The Small Faces
- Finders Keepers, starring Cliff Richard
- Hold On!, starring Herman's Hermits
- The Ghost Goes Gear, starring the Spencer Davis Group

== Births ==
- 3 January – Martin Galway, composer
- 21 January – Wendy James, rock singer (Transvision Vamp)
- 6 February – Rick Astley, singer
- 22 February – Jason Feddy, singer-songwriter
- 11 April – Lisa Stansfield, soul singer
- 15 April – Samantha Fox, model and singer
- 11 May – Julian Joseph, pianist and composer
- 13 May – Alison Goldfrapp, musician (Goldfrapp)
- 15 May – Pete Wiggs, keyboard player, songwriter, and producer (Saint Etienne)
- 8 June – Doris Pearson, R&B singer (Five Star)
- 1 July – Franny Griffiths, keyboardist (Space)
- 11 July – Melanie Appleby, singer (Mel and Kim) (d. 1990)
- 15 July – Jason Bonham, drummer
- 29 July – Miles Hunt, musician and author
- 31 July – Ben Daglish, composer and musician (d. 2018)
- 12 August – Sharon D. Clarke, theatre and television actress and singer
- 26 August – Shirley Manson, Scottish rock musician (Garbage)
- 30 August – Peter Cunnah, singer (D Ream)
- 7 September – Chris Acland, musician (d. 1996)
- 12 October – Brian Kennedy, musician and author
- 19 October – Sinitta, singer and actress
- 10 November – Steve Mackey, bassist (Pulp)
- 22 November – Eg White, bassist (Brother Beyond), songwriter and record producer
- 2 December – David Poore, film and TV composer
- 7 December – Gem Archer, guitarist (Oasis)
- date unknown – Paul Newland, composer

== Deaths ==
- 28 January – Benjamin Burrows, composer, 74
- 7 March – Mike Millward, guitarist and singer (The Fourmost), 23 (leukaemia)
- 14 March – Dennis Noble, operatic baritone, 67
- 2 May – Percy Kahn, pianist and composer, 85
- 23 July – Donald Novis, actor and singer who spent his career in the United States, 60
- 7 October – Johnny Kidd, singer, 30 (car accident)
- 10 October – William Wells Hewitt, organist and composer, 67
- 26 October – Alma Cogan, singer, 34 (cancer)
- 3 November – Eric Spear, film composer, 58
- 12 December – Nellie Briercliffe, singer and actress with the D'Oyly Carte company, 77
- 18 December – Steuart Wilson, tenor and musical administrator, 77

== See also ==
- 1966 in British radio
- 1966 in British television
- 1966 in the United Kingdom
- List of British films of 1966
