= List of British films of 1966 =

A list of films produced in the United Kingdom in 1966 (see 1966 in film):

== 1966 ==
Title	Director	Cast	Genre	Notes
1966
After the Fox	Vittorio De Sica	Peter Sellers, Britt Ekland, Victor Mature	Comedy	Co-production with Italy
Alfie	Lewis Gilbert	Michael Caine, Shelley Winters, Millicent Martin, Vivien Merchant	Comedy	Number 33 in the list of BFI Top 100 British films and won the Jury Special Prize at the 1966 Cannes Film Festival
Alice in Wonderland	Jonathan Miller	Peter Sellers	Fantasy	
Blowup	Michelangelo Antonioni	David Hemmings, Vanessa Redgrave, Sarah Miles	Mystery	Number 60 in the list of BFI Top 100 British films; Palme d'Or winner
The Blue Max	John Guillermin	George Peppard, Ursula Andress, James Mason	World War I drama	
Born Free	James H. Hill	Virginia McKenna, Bill Travers, Geoffrey Keen	Biopic	
The Boy Cried Murder	George Breakston	Fraser MacIntosh, Veronica Hurst, Phil Brown, Tim Barrett	Crime	Co-production with West Germany and Yugoslavia
The Brides of Fu Manchu	Don Sharp	Christopher Lee, Douglas Wilmer, Marie Versini	Thriller	Co-production with West Germany
Carry On Screaming!	Gerald Thomas	Jim Dale, Harry H. Corbett, Kenneth Williams	Comedy	
The Christmas Tree	Jim Clark		Children's	
Circus of Fear	John Llewellyn Moxey	Christopher Lee, Leo Genn	Horror	Co-production with West Germany
Cul-de-sac	Roman Polanski	Donald Pleasence, Françoise Dorléac, Lionel Stander	Thriller	Won the Golden Bear at Berlin
Daleks' Invasion Earth 2150 A.D.	Gordon Flemyng	Peter Cushing, Bernard Cribbins	Sci-Fi	
Dateline Diamonds	Jeremy Summers	Small Faces, The Chantelles, Kiki Dee	Music	
The Deadly Bees	Freddie Francis	Suzanna Leigh, Guy Doleman, Frank Finlay	Horror	
Death Is a Woman	Frederic Goode	Trisha Noble, Mark Burns, Shaun Curry	Mystery	
Disk-O-Tek Holiday	Douglas Hickox, Vincent Scarza	Jon Anderson, Tony Anderson	Musical	
Doctor in Clover	Ralph Thomas	Leslie Phillips, Joan Sims	Comedy	
Don't Look Now, We're Being Shot At	Gérard Oury	Bourvil, Terry-Thomas	War-comedy	Anglo-French co-production
Don't Lose Your Head	Gerald Thomas	Sid James, Jim Dale	Comedy	
Dracula: Prince of Darkness	Terence Fisher	Christopher Lee, Barbara Shelley	Horror	
Eye of the Devil	J. Lee Thompson	Deborah Kerr, David Niven	Horror	
Fahrenheit 451	François Truffaut	Julie Christie, Oskar Werner	Futuristic drama	Based on the Ray Bradbury novel
The Family Way	Roy Boulting	Hayley Mills, Hywel Bennett	Drama	
The Fighting Prince of Donegal	Michael O'Herlihy	Peter McEnery, Susan Hampshire	Adventure	Co-production with the United States
Finders Keepers	Sidney Hayers	Cliff Richard, Bruce Welch	Musical	
Funeral In Berlin	Guy Hamilton	Michael Caine, Guy Doleman, Oskar Homolka	Spy thriller	Based on Len Deighton's novel
A Funny Thing Happened on the Way to the Forum	Richard Lester	Zero Mostel, Phil Silvers, Michael Crawford	Comedy	
Georgy Girl	Silvio Narizzano	Lynn Redgrave, James Mason	Drama	Entered into the 16th Berlin International Film Festival
The Ghost Goes Gear	Hugh Gladwish	Spencer Davis Group, Sheila White, Nicholas Parsons	Musical	
The Great St. Trinian's Train Robbery	Sidney Gilliat, Frank Launder	Frankie Howerd, Reg Varney	Comedy	
The Hand of Night	Frederic Goode	William Sylvester, Diane Clare	Thriller	
Hotel Paradiso	Peter Glenville	Alec Guinness, Gina Lollobrigida	Comedy	
I Was Happy Here	Desmond Davis	Sarah Miles, Cyril Cusack	Drama	
The Idol	Daniel Petrie	Jennifer Jones, Michael Parks	Drama	
Invasion	Alan Bridges	Edward Judd, Valerie Gearon	Sci-fi	
Island of Terror	Terence Fisher	Edward Judd, Peter Cushing	Horror	
It Happened Here	Kevin Brownlow, Andrew Mollo	Pauline Murray, Sebastian Shaw	Drama	
Judith	Daniel Mann	Sophia Loren, Peter Finch	Drama	Co-production with Israel and the United States
Kaleidoscope	Jack Smight	Warren Beatty, Susannah York	Crime drama	
Khartoum	Basil Dearden	Laurence Olivier, Charlton Heston	Historical drama	
Mademoiselle	Tony Richardson	Jeanne Moreau, Ettore Manni, Keith Skinner	Romance/drama	
A Man Could Get Killed	Ronald Neame/ Cliff Owen	James Garner, Melina Mercouri, Sandra Dee	Comedy/thriller	
A Man for All Seasons	Fred Zinnemann	Paul Scofield, Wendy Hiller, Leo McKern, Orson Welles	Historical drama	Winner of six Academy Awards, entered into the 5th Moscow International Film Festival
Modesty Blaise	Joseph Losey	Monica Vitti, Terence Stamp, Dirk Bogarde	Spy	Entered into the 1966 Cannes Film Festival
Morgan!	Karel Reisz	David Warner, Vanessa Redgrave, Robert Stephens	Drama	
Naked Evil	Stanley Goulder	Basil Dignam, Anthony Ainley	Horror	
One Million Years B.C.	Don Chaffey	Raquel Welch; John Richardson	Prehistoric adventure	
Our Man in Marrakesh	Don Sharp	Tony Randall, Senta Berger, Terry-Thomas	Spy comedy	
The Plague of the Zombies	John Gilling	André Morell, Diane Clare, Jacqueline Pearce	Horror	
The Psychopath	Freddie Francis	Patrick Wymark, Margaret Johnston, Judy Huxtable	Mystery	
The Quiller Memorandum	Michael Anderson	George Segal, Senta Berger, Alec Guinness, Max von Sydow	Spy thriller	Based on Adam Hall's novel; nominated for three BAFTAs
Rasputin the Mad Monk	Don Sharp	Christopher Lee, Barbara Shelley	Horror	
The Reptile	John Gilling	Noel Willman, Jennifer Daniel	Horror	
Run with the Wind (1966 film)	Lindsay Shonteff	Francesca Annis, Sean Caffrey	Drama	
The Sandwich Man	Robert Hartford-Davis	Michael Bentine, Dora Bryan, Harry H. Corbett	Comedy	
Sky West and Crooked	John Mills	Hayley Mills	Romantic drama	
The Spy with a Cold Nose	Daniel Petrie	Laurence Harvey, Daliah Lavi	Comedy	
That Riviera Touch	Cliff Owen	Eric Morecambe, Ernie Wise	Comedy	
They're a Weird Mob	Michael Powell	Walter Chiari, Claire Dunne, Chips Rafferty	Adventure/comedy	Filmed in Australia
Thunderbirds Are Go	David Lane	Peter Dyneley, Sylvia Anderson	Sci-fi	
The Trap	Sidney Hayers	Oliver Reed, Rita Tushingham	Action	
Triple Cross	Terence Young	Christopher Plummer, Romy Schneider, Gert Fröbe	Spy/thriller	British-French-West German co-production
The Trygon Factor	Cyril Frankel	Stewart Granger, Susan Hampshire	Thriller	British German co-production
The Uncle	Desmond Davis	Rupert Davies, Brenda Bruce	Drama	
Where the Bullets Fly	John Gilling	Tom Adams, Dawn Addams	Espionage	
Who Killed the Cat?	Montgomery Tully	Mary Merrall, Ellen Pollock	Mystery	
The Witches	Cyril Frankel	Joan Fontaine, Alec McCowen, Kay Walsh	Horror	
The Wrong Box	Bryan Forbes	John Mills, Ralph Richardson, Michael Caine	Comedy	
The Yellow Hat	Honoria Plesch	Valentine Palmer, Frances Barlow	Drama	

== See also ==
- 1966 in British music
- 1966 in British radio
- 1966 in British television
- 1966 in the United Kingdom
