= Timeline of American sport on UK television =

This is a timeline of UK television coverage of the four major sports in the USA - American football (the NFL and College Football), basketball (NBA and College Basketball), NHL ice hockey and Major League Baseball.

== 1970s ==
- 1978
  - 7 January - Highlights of the Rose Bowl Game are broadcast on Grandstand for the first time. American sport is shown on the programme very occasionally in the coming years but had ended by the mid-1980s.
- 1979
  - No events.

== 1980s ==
- 1980
  - No events.
- 1981
  - 3 January - For the fourth and final time, highlights of the Rose Bowl Game are broadcast on Grandstand.
- 1982
  - 7 November – Coverage of American sport gets its first regular coverage on UK television when Channel 4 starts broadcasting American football on a weekly basis.
- 1983
  - 30 January – Live American football is seen in the UK for the first time when Channel 4 broadcasts live coverage of Super Bowl XVII.
- 1984
  - 29 March – Screensport launches and coverage of American sport is a significant part of its output throughout its time on air.
- 1985
  - No events.
- 1986
  - No events.
- 1987
  - 29 August – As part of its newly launched overnight schedule, London Weekend Television shows weekly highlights of American sport, including Major League Baseball, IndyCar racing and college football. The coverage is also broadcast on Anglia Television due to Anglia simulcasting LWT's overnight schedule. The coverage ends approximately a year later.
- 1988
  - ESPN increases its stake in Screensport from 3.5% to 25.5% after purchasing shares from WHSmith for £4.4 million. By this year, the channel's coverage of American sport includesthe NHL, NBA and Major League Baseball.
- 1989
  - No events.

== 1990s ==
- 1990
  - No events.
- 1991
  - No events.
- 1992
  - No events.
- 1993
  - Following the demise of Screensport, Sky Sports takes over as the UK's broadcaster of Major League Baseball.
- 1994
  - No events.
- 1995
  - Sky Sports broadcasts the NFL for the first time.
- 1996
  - 11 April – Channel 4 trials an overnight sports programme. Airing for six weeks, Nightsports mixes comment and live action from America.
- 1997
  - 31 March – On its first night on air, Channel 5 launches its overnight weekday live and recorded coverage of American sports. The first programme features the opening day of the 1997 Major League Baseball season.
- 1998
  - 25 January – Channel 4 ends its coverage of American football when it shows Super Bowl XXXII. This ends a relationship with the sport that had existed since its first week on air. The rights move to Channel 5 and remain with Channel 5 until 2004.
  - March – MLB on Five launches when Channel 5 decides to create a specific programme for its coverage of Major League Baseball.
- 1999
  - No events.

== 2000s ==
- 2000
  - No events.
- 2001
  - No events.
- 2002
  - 5 December – NASN launches to show live and recorded coverage of North American sports.
- 2003
  - No events.
- 2004
  - June – Channel 5's regular coverage of the National Hockey League ends for two years when the primary broadcast rights move to NASN.
- 2005
  - January – ITV broadcasts American football for the first time when it shows the play-offs and the Super Bowl. ITV also broadcasts these events in 2006 and 2007 until the rights move to the BBC in 2008.
- 2006
  - 13 March – NASN buys the rights to show ten live Major League Baseball games a week.
  - September – Channel 5 resumes its coverage of the National Hockey League.
- 2007
  - March – ESPN buys NASN and the purchase sees the return of ESPN's flagship magazine shows, such as Baseball Tonight, Around the Horn, The Sports Reporters and Pardon the Interruption, which had not been shown since the previous year after the contract between NASN and ESPN ended.
  - September –
    - The BBC shows coverage of the NFL for the first time.
    - Channel 5 returns to NFL coverage when it signs a two-year deal to broadcast Monday Night Football and NBC Sunday Night Football.
- 2008
  - 29 October – MLB on Five is broadcast for the final time to coincide with Channel 5 deciding to end its coverage of Major League Baseball due to the Great Recession.
- 2009
  - 1 February – NASN is renamed ESPN America following the sale in late 2006 of the channel to ESPN.
  - 12 June – Channel 5's coverage of the NHL finishes. It also ends its coverage of the NBA at the same time.

== 2010s ==
- 2010
  - 1 March – A European edition of SportsCenter starts to be broadcast five nights a week on ESPN America.
  - Channel 5 ends its live overnight coverage of American sport, when it decides not to continue its coverage of American football. This brings to an end its coverage of American sport which had been a mainstay of Channel 5's weeknight overnight programming since the channel's launch.
  - 21 June – ESPN America begins broadcasting in high definition.
  - September – American football returns to Channel 4 after more than a decade when the channel starts broadcasting the Sunday Night Football match.
  - 14 September – ESPN UK starts broadcasting live coverage of all of the National Football League's Monday night matches as well as the 90-minute pre-game programme, Monday Night Countdown.
- 2011
  - 12 October – Premier Sports announces that they will broadcast up to 10 live National Hockey League games per week from the 2011–12 season. The rights had previously been held by ESPN America although the channel does broadcast some matches for the remainder of that season.
- 2012
  - April – ESPN America stops broadcasting a European version of SportsCentre, instead opting to broadcast an edited version of the 2am show produced in Los Angeles.
  - 5 July – Premier Sports announces that NHL will continue for a further 4 years on the channel with appropriately 400 games per season being broadcast and complemented by a daily broadcast of Hockey Tonight. Premier later further extends its coverage of NHL which now runs until 2021.
  - September – The BBC broadcasts Monday Night Football but does so for just one season as for the 2013/14 season, terrestrial coverage of the NFL moves to Channel 4.
- 2013
  - 8 September – Channel 4's American football coverage expands when it signs a new two-year deal with the NFL to become the terrestrial home to the game for the next two seasons. The deal sees the return of the Super Bowl to Channel 4, 16 years after it had last shown the event.
  - 9 September – Eurosport becomes the new broadcast of the NFL's Monday Night Football. Eurosport broadcasts the weekly game for the next two seasons.
  - 1 December – BT Sport shows its first NBA match, thereby adding professional basketball to its broadcasting of the college game which it shows as part of its coverage of the NCAA.
- 2014
  - No events.
- 2015
  - Sky Sports secures live coverage of NBC's Sunday Night Football coverage and ESPN's Monday Night Football, giving Sky live rights to every NFL game during the season for the first time.
  - 9 September – The BBC announces that the NFL will return to its screens after two seasons on Channel 4. The deal includes the rights to show the NFL London Games live with at least one match being exclusively live. The BBC also show weekly highlights and magazine shows, which starts in November. The deal included live television, radio and online rights to screen the Super Bowl alongside Sky Sports.
- 2016
  - No events.
- 2017
  - No events.
- 2018
  - June – BT Sport shows the NBA for the final time ahead of the rights transferring to Sky Sports.
  - October – Basketball's NBA returns to Sky Sports after a decade with ESPN and BT Sport.
- 2019
  - 29 June – The BBC shows live Major League Baseball for the first time when it screens the inaugural MLB London Series.

== 2020s ==
- 2020
  - 3 September – Sky Sports NFL launches. It is an in-season rebrand of Sky Sports Action and provides round-the clock coverage of the NFL. As well as live and recorded coverage of games, output includes simulcasts of magazine shows from NFL Network such as Good Morning Football and NFL Total Access. The channel broadcasts until early February 2021. Sky Sports NFL returns for the following season, running from 23 August 2021 until February 2022.
  - 14 September – Channel 5 resumes its coverage of the NFL when it starts showing the weekly Monday night game plus a weekly highlights show.
- 2021
  - No events.
- 2022
  - September – Sky Sports begins showing Notre Dame home matches. This is the first time that Sky has broadcast College Football matches live as previous coverage of the NCAA. aired in the 1990s, had been restricted to highlights.
  - 9 September – After seven years on the BBC, terrestrial coverage of the NFL returns to ITV. The deal includes the rights to show two of the three NFL London Games and the Super Bowl in addition to a weekly highlights programme.
  - 22 September – Major League Baseball returns to BBC screens as part of a new deal to show the MLB London Series. The new deal also gives the BBC rights to show games played in America for the first time.
- 2023
  - 29 March – The BBC shows the first of nine games from the final stages of the 2022–23 NBA season. The Corporation broadcasts six regular season games, two play-off games, one Conference Finals game and one NBA Finals game plus selected highlights and an end-of-season review show.
  - 18 July – BT Sport is relaunched as TNT Sports following the sale of BT Sport to Warner Bros. Discovery EMEA. This sees the cessation of ESPN studio programming as well as the ending of showings of ESPN-produced documentaries. Therefore, TNT does not continue with BT Sport's coverage of the NCAA and is the only set of BT-owned sports rights that it does not continue to show.
  - 24 October – TNT replaces Sky as rights holder to the NBA. The deal sees TNT show more than 250 games each season.
  - 18 November – Following an agreement with ESPN, Sky Sports starts showing three College Football games a week plus the Bowl season and ESPN's pre-game show College Gameday. The deal also includes the 2024 College football season.
  - November - As part of the aforementioned deal with ESPN, Sky Sports beings broadcasting three College Basketball matches each week.
- 2024
  - 19 March-8 April – Sky Sports shows coverage of College Basketball's March Madness tournament for the first time. Sky also shows the 2025 tournament.
- 2025
  - 29 August – The NCAA moves to DAZN following an agreement with ESPN to show games broadcast by ESPN (and ABC). Games shown by other broadcasters, such as Fox and CBS, are initially not shown as part of this deal. Sky Sports continues to show Notre Dame home games live on Sky Sports NFL due to Notre Dame's home games being shown on NBC.
  - 7 September –
    - Channel 5 starts showing two games/week during the regular season - the 6pm on Five and the 9.15pm on 5Action. Channel 5 will also show the London and Dublin matches, three play-off games and the Super Bowl.
    - There is also an increase in the number of games that Sky Sports now broadcasts as its latest deal sees Sky covering five more Sunday night games - two more 6pm matches and thee more 9pm games. Altogether, Sky is now showing more than half of all NFL matches.
  - 11 October – DAZN begins to show College Football games from the Big Ten Conference.
  - 21 October – Coverage of the NBA returns to Sky Sports, with games in the UK also available via Prime Video.
