= This Is Petula Clark =

British television series

This Is Petula Clark is a comedy/variety television show that aired on the BBC, with the first six-episode series in summer of 1966 and a seven-episode series from December 1967 to January 1968. In the episodes, host Petula Clark intermingled her own contemporary hits with other popular standards, and introduced to the British public international stars who were relatively unknown in the United Kingdom. Guests included Claude François, Raphael, Fred Bongusto, Sacha Distel and Les Surfs.
