= Neil Reynolds (presenter) =

English sportscaster (born 1974)

- Born: 24 November 1974 (age 51); Canterbury, England
- Occupations: Television presenter, journalist, broadcaster
- Years active: 1990s–present
- Employer(s): Sky Sports, NFL UK
- Known for: Hosting NFL on Sky Sports

Neil Reynolds (born 24 November 1974) is an English television presenter, journalist, and broadcaster best known for his coverage of the National Football League (NFL) in the United Kingdom. He is the lead host of NFL on Sky Sports and serves as the Head of NFL UK content.

== Career ==
Reynolds began writing for several UK publications as a sports journalist before transitioning into broadcasting. He initially joined Sky Sports NFL as part of its coverage team before eventually becoming the primary studio host.

He has presented coverage of major NFL events including the Super Bowl, the NFL International Series, and the NFL draft. Beyond television, Reynolds also co-hosts the official NFL UK podcast, Inside the Huddle, and frequently interviews current and former NFL players and coaches.

In addition to his media work, Reynolds has been involved in grassroots development of American football in the UK, promoting the sport through youth initiatives and fan engagement events.

== Publications ==
Reynolds has authored and contributed to books and articles about the NFL, including player biographies and analyses of the league’s growth in Europe.

== Personal life ==
Reynolds was born in Canterbury, Kent, and has supported American football since his youth. He cites the Miami Dolphins as his favourite team.
