= Charlie MacEwan =

British Army officer

Major Charles MacEwan MVO MVO (born 25 February 1966) is a former British Army Officer and is a member of the British Royal Household. MacEwan was educated at Harrow School and the Royal Military Academy Sandhurst. He joined the Irish Guards in 1987 and retired in 1998.

With postings to Belize, Northern Ireland, Berlin and Oman, MacEwan was staff captain (London District) in 1993 and his last posting was as an Equerry to Queen Elizabeth The Queen Mother.

After two years at Gartmore Investment Management, MacEwan joined Western Provident Association and became the Corporate Communications Director for WPA, Director of Good Causes at the WPA Benevolent Foundation (created in 2011) and an Extra Equerry to Prince Richard, Duke of Gloucester (since 2003).

MacEwan married Lucy Mary Dove in 1998 and has a daughter, Flora Georgina Mary MacEwan (b. 2 October 2003), and a son, Andrew William MacEwan (b. 24 November 2005).
