= Rianna Scipio =

British TV host, journalist, producer and director

- Born: December 11, 1966 (age 59); London
- Occupations: Television host, journalist
- Website: RiannaScipio.com

Rianna Soraya Scipio is a British television host, journalist, producer and director who is best known for her work on UK national television, as a prime-time television host (presenter) of such flagship series as the BBC‘s Watchdog, Holiday, UK’s Worst…?, Newsroom Southeast, Wide World (Channel 5), and on BBC Radio 2 and Choice FM (Global Radio).

Scipio is recognized as the UK’s first black weather girl and has been involved in film.

After Moira Stuart declined the role, Scipio was approached to be the main host of Black Britain, the first program of its kind from the BBC’s News and Current Affairs Department. Across three seasons, Scipio conducted television interview one-hour specials with such accidental heroes as Doreen Lawrence, mother of slain teenager Stephen Lawrence, who singlehandedly changed the face of British justice.

Her celebrity interviewees include Piers Morgan, Deepak Chopra, Mel B, Terry McMillan, Jackie Collins, Levi Roots, Laura Carmichael, Bruno Tonioli and Lara Pulver.
