= Matt Jarvis (psychologist) =

British psychologist (born 1966)

Matt Jarvis (born 1966) is a British chartered psychologist and Chartered Scientist. He currently teaches psychology education at Totton College and freelances as an author and trainer, including for the Science Learning Centres. Jarvis is best known as a British author of psychology textbooks, including both introductory student texts and professional-level texts for teachers.

Teaching 14-19 Psychology: issues & techniques, published by Psychology Press (formerly Teaching post-16 Psychology, published by Nelson Thornes), is the standard text for UK Initial Teacher Training and master's degrees in the teaching of psychology. Angles on Psychology, currently published by Oxford University Press, is endorsed by Edexcel for their psychology A-level. Psychology for WJEC AS-level is endorsed by WJEC.

== Bibliography ==
- Jarvis M (1999) Sport psychology. London, Routledge
- Jarvis M (2000) Theoretical perspectives in psychology. London, Routledge
- Jarvis M, Russell J, Flanagan C & Dolan L (2000) Angles on psychology. Cheltenham, Nelson Thornes
- Jarvis M (2001) Angles on child psychology. Cheltenham, Nelson Thornes.
- Russell J & Jarvis M (2002) Key ideas in psychology. Cheltenham, Nelson Thornes.
- Jarvis M, Putwain D & Dwyer D (2002) Angles on atypical psychology. Cheltenham, Nelson Thornes.
- Russell J & Jarvis M (2003) (Eds) Angles on applied psychology. Cheltenham, Nelson Thornes.
- Jarvis M (2004) Psychodynamic psychology: classical theory and contemporary research. London, Thomson Learning.
- Jarvis M, Russell J & Gorman P (2004) Angles on psychology 2nd ed. Cheltenham, Nelson Thornes.
- Jarvis M (2005) The psychology of effective learning and teaching. Cheltenham, Nelson Thornes.
- Jarvis M (2006) Teaching post-16 psychology. Cheltenham, Nelson Thornes.
- Jarvis M (2006) Sport psychology: a student handbook. London, Routledge.
- Jarvis M (2007) Psychology for WJEC AS-level. London, Hodder & Stoughton.
- Jarvis M, Russell J & Collis D (2008) Angles on psychology 3rd ed. Haddenham, Folens.
- Jarvis M, Russell J & Lawton J (2008) Exploring psychology. Haddenham, Folens.
- Jarvis M, Russell J & Collis D (2009) Angles on psychology for A2 level 2nd ed. Haddenham, Folens.
- Russell J & Jarvis M (2011) WJEC AS psychology 2nd ed. London, Hodder Education.
- Jarvis M (2011) Teaching 14-19 psychology: issues & techniques. London, Routledge.
- Duffy K & Jarvis M (in press) Handbook of teaching psychology. London, Routledge.
