= Nick Rhodes (biochemist) =

Nick Rhodes is a Reader in Tissue Engineering and Regenerative Medicine at the University of Liverpool, in the U.K. Tissue Engineering can be described as the use of engineering techniques, including engineering materials and processes, in order to grow living tissues. Regenerative Medicine can be described as the treatment of defective tissues using the regenerative capacity of the body's healthy tissues. Rhodes describes the discipline as "aiming to repair tissue defects by driving regeneration of healthy tissues using engineered materials and processes."

== Biography ==
Nick Rhodes was born in Manchester, UK in 1966 and attended the University of Lancaster where he gained a bachelor's degree in Biochemistry. He gained a Masters in Bioengineering from the University of Strathclyde where he learned the basics of blood compatibility. He trained under Professor David F Williams at the University of Liverpool where he completed his Ph.D. in blood compatibility. He was awarded an Advanced Research Fellowship from the UK Engineering and Physical Sciences Research Council (EPSRC) which allowed him the opportunity to broaden his research into biomaterials for Tissue Engineering.

Rhodes continued his research at the University of Liverpool, being appointed a Lecturer within the faculty of medicine in 1999, followed by Senior Lecturer in 2003, then Reader in 2007. He had a prime role in the funding and design of the UKBioTEC laboratories and co-founded the UK Centre for Tissue Engineering, which exists as a specialised unit within the Division of Clinical Engineering.

Rhodes has served on the editorial board of the International Journal of Adipose Tissue. from 2006–2009 and is currently an Associate Editor of the scientific journal Annals of Biomedical Engineering. He was appointed treasurer and officer of the governing board of the Tissue Engineering & Regenerative Medicine International Society (TERMIS) in 2005 and has served as on the Medical Engineering EPSRC review panel since 2001. His research centres on soft tissue and cardiovascular tissue engineering and adult stem cells in regenerative medicine and is well known in European Commission funded projects.

He has been featured on the Regenerative Medicine Today newsite, referenced on the BBC News site and his fellowship work within the EPSRC site
