= Under the Red Robe =

Under the Red Robe may refer to:

- Under the Red Robe (novel), an 1894 novel about Cardinal Richelieu by Stanley J. Weyman
- Under the Red Robe (1915 film), a British silent historical film directed by Wilfred Noy, based on the novel
- Under the Red Robe (1923 film), an American silent historical drama directed by Alan Crosland, based on the novel
- Under the Red Robe (1937 film), a British / American film directed by Victor Sjöström, based on the novel
