= Day of the Dupes =

Day in November 1630 in French history

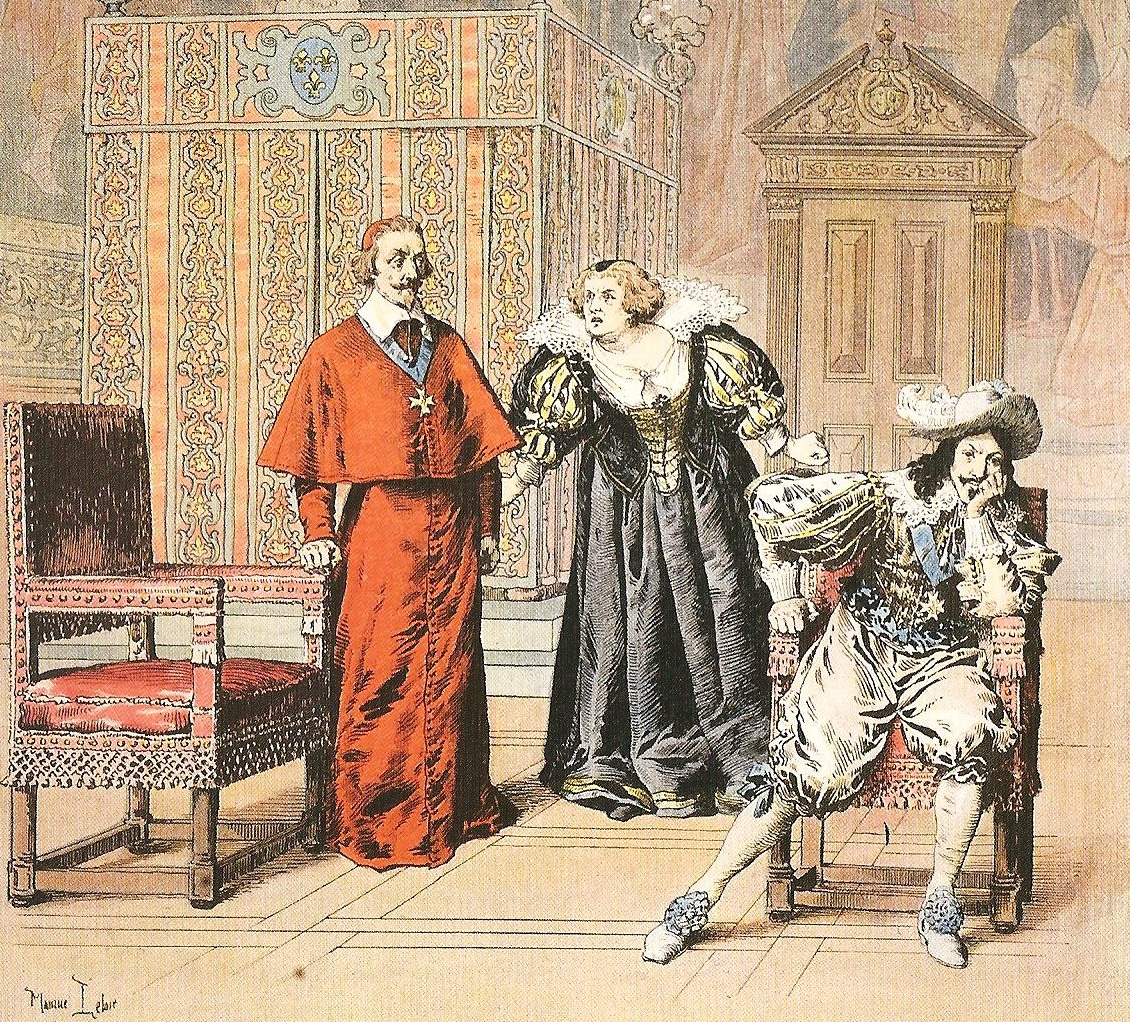
Marie de' Medici confronts Cardinal Richelieu before Louis XIII. Illustration by Maurice Leloir (1901)

Day of the Dupes (French: la journée des Dupes) is the name given to a day in French history in November 1630 on which the enemies of Cardinal Richelieu mistakenly believed that they had succeeded in persuading King Louis XIII to dismiss Richelieu from power. The incident is thought to have occurred on the 10th, 11th, or 12th of that month.

In November 1630, the political relations between the cardinal and the queen mother, the Italian-born Marie de' Medici, reached a crisis. In a stormy scene on 10 November in the Luxembourg Palace, Marie de' Medici and the cardinal met in the king's presence. The queen mother demanded the cardinal's dismissal, declaring that the king had to choose between him and her.

No immediate decision came from this conference, but the king retired to his hunting lodge in Versailles without saying a word or looking at Richelieu. This led the cardinal to believe that his political career was over, but the intercession of influential friends convinced the minister he could salvage himself from his seemingly impending disgrace. While the apartments of the Luxembourg Palace were thronged by the cardinal's enemies celebrating his fall, Richelieu followed the king to Versailles, where the monarch assured him of continued support. Marie eventually exiled herself to Compiègne.

The "Day of the Dupes," as this event was called, marks the complete restoration of the cardinal to royal favor.

== In literature ==
A historical novel by Stanley J. Weyman, Under the Red Robe (adapted into film in 1915, 1923 and 1937) concerns the Day of the Dupes. The Day of the Dupes also forms part of the plot in Alexandre Dumas' unfinished novel The Red Sphinx.

== Bibliography ==
- Batiffol, Louis [in French] (1925). La journée des dupes. Paris: Hachette.
- Chevallier, Pierre [in French] (1978). "La Véritable journée des Dupes (11 novembre 1630)". Mémoires de la Société académique de l'Aube (in French). Vol. 108. Troyes: Paton. pp. 193–253. OCLC 690381003.
- Church, William Farr (2015). "Richelieu's Adversaries: Factions of the Great, 1629–1632". Richelieu and Reason of State. Princeton University Press. pp. 197–235. ISBN 978-1-4008-6774-5.
- Mongredien, Georges [in French] (1961). La Journee des Dupes, 10 novembre 1630. Trente journees qui ont fait la France (in French). Paris: Gallimard. OCLC 930492781.
