= The Daleks =

1963–1964 Doctor Who serial

002 – The Daleks
- Doctor Who serial
- A Dalek threatens Barbara in its first on-screen appearance, considered among the programme's most iconic cliffhangers.

Cast
- Doctor: William Hartnell – First Doctor
- Companions: William Russell – Ian Chesterton; Jacqueline Hill – Barbara Wright; Carole Ann Ford – Susan Foreman
- Others: Peter Hawkins, David Graham – Dalek Voices; Robert Jewell, Kevin Manser, Michael Summerton, Gerald Taylor, Peter Murphy – Daleks; Alan Wheatley – Temmosus; John Lee – Alydon; Virginia Wetherell – Dyoni; Philip Bond – Ganatus; Marcus Hammond – Antodus; Jonathan Crane – Kristas; Gerald Curtis – Elyon; Chris Browning, Katie Cashfield, Vez Delahunt, Kevin Glenny, Ruth Harrison, Lesley Hill, Steve Pokol, Jeanette Rossini, Eric Smith – Thals

Production
- Directed by: Christopher Barry (1–2, 4–5); Richard Martin (3, 6–7)
- Written by: Terry Nation
- Script editor: David Whitaker
- Produced by: Verity Lambert
- Music by: Tristram Cary
- Production code: B
- Series: Season 1
- Running time: 7 episodes, 25 minutes each
- First broadcast: 21 December 1963
- Last broadcast: 1 February 1964

Chronology
| ← Preceded by An Unearthly Child | Followed by → The Edge of Destruction |

The Daleks (also known as The Mutants and The Dead Planet) is the second serial of the British science fiction television series Doctor Who, which was first broadcast on BBC TV in seven weekly parts from 21 December 1963 to 1 February 1964. Written by Terry Nation and directed by Christopher Barry and Richard Martin, this story marks the first appearance of the show's most popular villains, the Daleks, and the recurring Skaro people, the Thals.

In the serial, the First Doctor (William Hartnell), his granddaughter Susan Foreman (Carole Ann Ford), and her teachers Ian Chesterton (William Russell) and Barbara Wright (Jacqueline Hill) land in an alien jungle and are captured by the Daleks, a race of mutated creatures who survive off the radiation that remains in the atmosphere after a nuclear war with their enemies. As the group attempt to escape the Daleks, they discover more about the planet and the ensuing war, and attempt to broker a peace.

The Daleks was originally commissioned by script editor David Whitaker, having seen Nation's other writing work. Nation wrote a story outline, influenced by the threat of racial extermination by the Nazis. Whitaker and producer Verity Lambert were impressed, despite disapproval from the show's creator Sydney Newman, who wanted to avoid serials with "bug-eyed monsters". Barry directed several episodes of The Daleks, trailed by Martin who directed three episodes due to Barry's other commitments. The Daleks were designed by Raymond Cusick, and underwent several iterations, while the Dalek voices were achieved using a ring modulator.

The serial premiered with seven million viewers, and audiences grew as news about the Daleks spread; the show's overall audience increased by 50% after the final episode. It received generally positive reviews, with praise for Nation's script, although several reviewers criticised its length. It later received several print adaptations, as well as home media and soundtrack releases, and was adapted into a feature film starring Peter Cushing. A 75-minute colourised version was broadcast in 2023 for the programme's 60th anniversary.

== Plot ==
The TARDIS lands in a petrified jungle, where the First Doctor (William Hartnell) tries to determine their position by taking a reading of the stars. He insists they explore a futuristic city they spot beyond the forest, but Ian Chesterton (William Russell) and Barbara Wright (Jacqueline Hill) are not convinced. In the forest, someone touches Susan Foreman's (Carole Ann Ford) shoulder; the Doctor does not believe her. Later, a box of vials is found outside the TARDIS. The Doctor claims the fluid link of the TARDIS is running low on mercury (a ruse he later admits to), forcing the crew to travel to the city in search of more mercury.

Barbara becomes separated from her colleagues in the city and is threatened by an unseen creature with a metal arm. Before long, the entire crew is captured by unseen creatures operating tank-like machines, the Daleks. Susan is eventually sent to retrieve anti-radiation drugs from the TARDIS after the Doctor realises this is what the box contained. Susan encounters a second species, the Thals, who used to be at war with the Daleks. The Thal who left the drugs reveals he encountered her in the forest. Susan attempts to broker peace between the two groups, and while it appears to work, the Daleks eventually betray the Thals, opening fire on them at what was supposed to be a peaceful exchange of food. The Daleks attempt using the anti-radiation drugs, but discover that they are fatal to Daleks. They conclude that Daleks need radiation to survive and decide to bombard the atmosphere with more radiation.

In the ensuing chaos, the Doctor and his companions escape with the Thals, and learn their version of the history of their planet. They also learn that the Thals are avowed pacifists. They are unable to leave Skaro, however, as the fluid link has been taken by the Daleks. In order to save them from the Daleks, the TARDIS crew convinces the Thals of the importance of aggression and warfare, and manages to lead the Thals in a successful attack against the Daleks. At the end, it is believed the Dalek race has been destroyed when their power supply is knocked out. The TARDIS crew leave Skaro, but an explosion in the TARDIS knocks them out.

== Production ==
=== Conception and writing ===
The second serial of Doctor Who was always planned to be futuristic, due to the historical nature of the first serial, An Unearthly Child. In July 1963, the serial was titled Doctor Who and the Robots, to be written by Anthony Coburn and directed by Rex Tucker; the latter was also set to direct the fourth serial, Doctor Who and the Mutants, for which script editor David Whitaker commissioned comedy writer Terry Nation on 31 July, impressed by his work in the science-fiction series Out of This World. Nation had written a 26-page outline for a story entitled The Survivors at his home, influenced by the threat of racial extermination by the Nazis and the concerns of advanced warfare, as well as taking influences from H. G. Wells' novel The Time Machine (1895). Impressed by the outline, producer Verity Lambert extended the serial from six to seven episodes on 8 August, to better express Nation's story.

Show creator Sydney Newman and head of serials Donald Wilson were unhappy with the serial, having wanted to avoid featuring "bug-eyed monsters"; however, with no other scripts prepared, they were forced to accept the serial for production. The serial was later brought forward to the second in broadcast order. Due to other sudden commitments, Nation quickly wrote the scripts for the serial at the rate of one per day. On 16 September, following Tucker's departure from the show, Christopher Barry was appointed to direct the serial. Lambert's original choice for director was Richard Martin, but Wilson wanted Barry to remain in charge. However, Barry's other work commitments led to a compromise by the production team: Barry would direct the early episodes of the serial, and Martin would trail him to gain more experience. The serial went through a number of working titles during production, including The Survivors and Beyond the Sun, before settling as The Mutants towards the end of production. (Note: The title The Mutants was used in most BBC paperwork for nearly a decade, until the 1972 serial The Mutants was aired. To avoid confusion, two other titles emerged as alternatives: The Dead Planet, the name of the first episode; and The Daleks, which was used on most media releases.)

=== Design and music ===
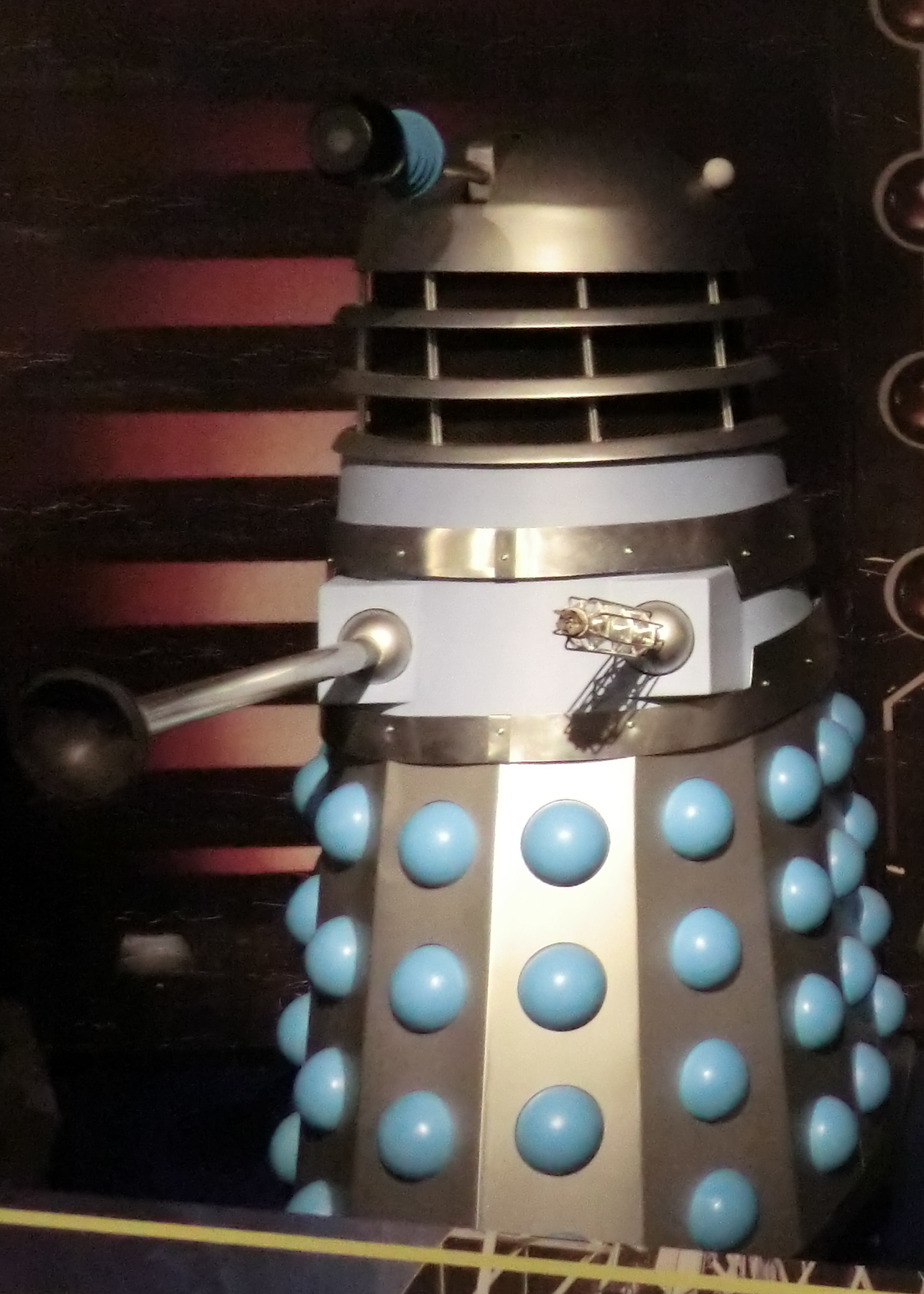
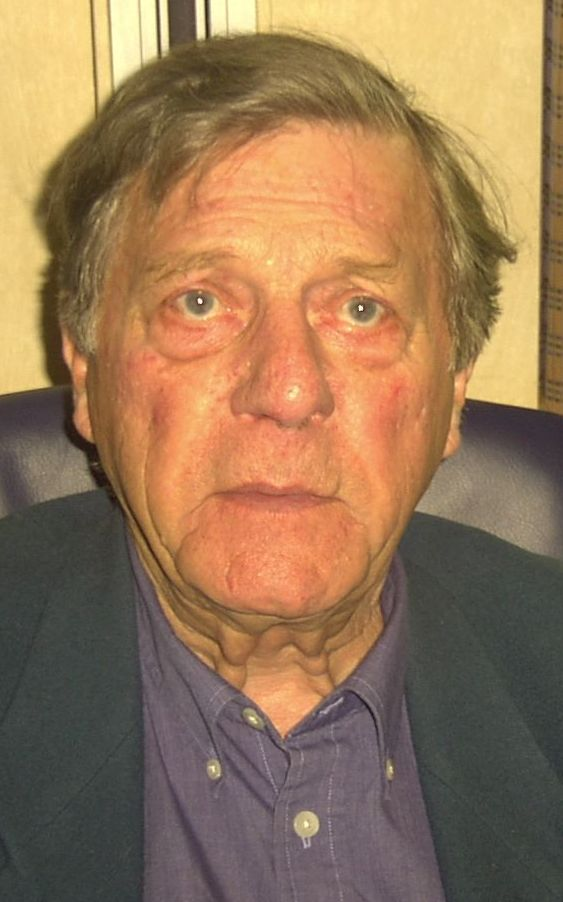
This serial introduces the Daleks, the show's most popular villains, designed by Raymond Cusick.

The designer originally assigned to this serial was Ridley Scott, later a famed film director. However, a problem with Scott's schedule meant that he was replaced by Raymond Cusick, who was thus given the task of realising the Dalek creatures. Cusick based the design of the Daleks on a man sitting in a chair. Cusick's original design was tubular, with a plain skirt section, bumpy midriff with one pincer arm, and a short head with an eye-lens; Lambert rejected this design as being too expensive. It was decided that the designs should be more comfortable for the actors, allowing them to be seated. Cusick's second design was shorter, with a diamond-patterned body and larger head, and two double-jointed claw arms; one of the arms was replaced by a suction cup, due to the low budget of the production. The design was refined to fit over a small tricycle, and the arms were moved further down to allow the operator to see out of a metal gauze above the midriff. Lights were added to the dome to indicate which Dalek was speaking, as suggested by Barry.

Shawcraft Models—who had designed parts of the TARDIS set—worked with Cusick to design the Daleks; when Cusick met with Shawcraft's Bill Roberts to discuss the project, he used a pepper pot to demonstrate the Daleks' movements. The prototype (known internally as "Shawcraft One") had a wooden base, with the skirt section made using fibreglass. It stood at four-foot six-inches, allowing a small seated actor inside. The BBC approved of Shawcraft's designs, allowing three weeks for the final models. While Cusick wanted six Daleks, the £500 budget only allowed for four. The final models stood at four-foot eight-inches, painted in silver with grey trimmings, and light blue balls on the skirt; the lights on the domes were Christmas tree lights covered by a ping-pong ball, operated by the actor inside.

Nation once claimed that he came up with the name "Dalek" after seeing a set of encyclopedias with one volume spanning the section of the alphabet from Dal – Lek. However, he later admitted that this was a story for the press, and that he had just made up the name. Barry commissioned Tristram Cary to provide the serial's incidental score, having worked together on No Cloak — No Dagger ; while Newman disliked Cary's work, Barry and Lambert convinced him otherwise. Barry had heard some musique concrète music and, intrigued by it, asked Cary to compose a strange and simplistic electronic score for the serial. About twenty minutes of music was used in the serial.

=== Casting and characters ===
Actor Alan Wheatley was chosen to portray Temmosus, the leader of the Thals, having worked with Hartnell in an episode of The Flying Doctor in 1959; David Markham was originally considered for the role. Virginia Wetherell was cast as the female Thal named Dyoni, having previously worked with Martin. Dinsdale Landen was chosen to play Ganatus, but production date changes forced him to drop out of the serial; he was replaced by Philip Bond, with whom Barry had worked on No Cloak — No Dagger. The names of the Thals were revised in the final script: Temmosus was originally Stohl, Alydon was Vahn, Ganatus was Kurt, Kristas was Jahl, Antodus was Ven, Dyoni was Daren, and Elyon was Zhor. Four actors were chosen as Dalek operators, due to their small stature and muscular ability: Robert Jewell, Kevin Manser, Michael Summerton, and Gerald Taylor; Barry knew Manser as a sensitive actor who reacted well to voices, while Martin knew Taylor through repertory theatre. Due to the Daleks' electronic voices, it was considered impractical for the actors inside the machines to also deliver the dialogue. As a result, the Dalek voices were performed off-set by Peter Hawkins and David Graham. Barry contacted the Post Office's Joint Speech Research Unit for information on electronic voices. Two samples were provided: one using a vocoder with low and medium monotone pitch; and one using written computer characters, generating a sound which was less human but more time-consuming. While Barry enjoyed these methods, the BBC opted to develop its own method to achieve a similar effect, as some of the Dalek speech was required in studio during production. Martin worked with Brian Hodgson of the BBC Radiophonic Workshop to find suitable tones; ultimately, the actors spoke through a lip-ribbon microphone, which was later given an electronic quality after passing through a ring modulator.

=== Filming ===
A week of shooting took place from 28 October 1963, consisting mostly of inserts of the city and models. Rehearsals for the cast began on 11 November; Nation only attended one session, due to work commitments. Some of the Dalek dialogue was pre-recorded on 13 November by Hawkins and Graham, portraying the higher-pitched "Dalek One" and lower-pitched "Dalek Two", respectively. Weekly recording of the serial began on 15 November; it was later discovered that the first recording was affected by induction—an effect in which the voices from the production assistants' headphones were clearly audible. The episode was re-recorded on 6 December, pushing the weekly recordings of episodes 4–7 back by one week. The final episode was recorded on 10 January 1964.

== Reception ==
=== Broadcast and ratings ===
| Episode | Title | Run time | Original release date | UK viewers (millions) | Appreciation Index |
|---|---|---|---|---|---|
| 1 | "The Dead Planet" | 24:22 | 21 December 1963 | 6.9 | 59 |
| 2 | "The Survivors" | 24:27 | 28 December 1963 | 6.4 | 58 |
| 3 | "The Escape" | 25:10 | 4 January 1964 | 8.9 | 63 |
| 4 | "The Ambush" | 24:37 | 11 January 1964 | 9.9 | 63 |
| 5 | "The Expedition" | 24:31 | 18 January 1964 | 9.9 | 63 |
| 6 | "The Ordeal" | 26:14 | 25 January 1964 | 10.4 | 63 |
| 7 | "The Rescue" | 22:24 | 1 February 1964 | 10.4 | 65 |

The first episode was broadcast on BBC TV on 21 December 1963, and was watched by 6.9 million viewers. The following episode received 6.4 million viewers. By the third episode, news about the Daleks had spread, and the episode was watched by 8.9 million viewers. An additional million viewers watched for the following two weeks, and the final two episodes reached 10.4 million; by the end of the serial, the show's overall audience had increased by 50%. To date, the serial has been repeated twice on the BBC: the final episode was broadcast on BBC Two late in the evening on 13 November 1999 as part of "Doctor Who Night", garnering 1.6 million viewers; and the serial was shown in three blocks from 5–9 April 2008 on BBC Four, as part of a celebration of the life and work of Lambert following her death in November 2007.

BBC Enterprises prepared to dispose of the 16mm telerecordings of the serial in 1978. When this was discovered by fan Ian Levine and BBC Enterprises Film Sales employee John Bridger, they contacted Sue Malden of BBC Archives to request that the destruction of The Daleks, and all other remaining 1960s Doctor Who serials, should cease. Subsequently, the remaining film prints were relocated to the BBC archives for preservation. A further copy of the fifth episode of the serial was discovered in the private collection of former BBC employee Francis Watson and returned to the BBC in 2004, and an additional copy of the second and third episodes were recovered from a deceased collector in 2026.

=== Critical response ===
Following the broadcast of the fifth episode, the Daily Mirror's Richard Sear described the show as "splendid children's stuff", describing the cliffhanger as "smashing". Retrospective reviews were also positive. In The Discontinuity Guide (1995), Paul Cornell, Martin Day, and Keith Topping described the serial as "brilliantly directed, full of inventive touches and wonderful set-pieces"; they noted that the first four episodes helped to launch Doctor Who to success, but wrote that the last three "comprise a B-movie trek through hideous landscapes", comparing it unfavourably to Flash Gordon. In The Television Companion (1998), David J. Howe and Stephen James Walker praised the serial for introducing the Daleks and lauded Cusick's designs, but felt that the Thals—particularly after the death of their leader Temmosus in the fourth episode—were "faceless stereotypes" used only for plot, and criticised their costume design. In A Critical History of Doctor Who (1999), John Kenneth Muir similarly praised the Daleks, as well as Barry's "stylish" direction and the performances of Hill and Hartnell. In 2006, DVD Talk's John Sinnott, despite noting that "there are a few parts that drag just a bit", commended the script for allowing the characters to develop and holding tension unlike the previous serial. In 2008, Patrick Mulkern of Radio Times praised the strength of Nation's scripts, particularly the first three cliffhangers, but felt that "the urgency and claustrophobia dissipate towards the end", describing the final battle as "a disappointingly limp affair". In 2011, Christopher Bahn of The A.V. Club wrote that the serial is "quite solid, full of well-paced action and some interestingly subtle characterizations, though it definitely begins to drag around the fifth episode, with a long trek through swamps and caverns that moves the plot forward by about an inch".

== Commercial releases ==
The story was originally released on VHS on 5 June 1989, with a photomontage cover. A remastered version of the serial was released on VHS on 26 February 2001 under the title Doctor Who: The Daleks (Remastered). For the DVD release on 30 January 2006, the serial was released as part of Doctor Who: The Beginning alongside the first and third serials, with several special features, including audio commentary by the production team and a documentary on the creation of the Daleks. The Daleks was added to BBC iPlayer on 1 November 2023 alongside most other serials.

=== In print ===
Doctor Who in an Exciting Adventure with the Daleks
- Author: David Whitaker
- Cover artist: Arnold Schwartzman (original publication); Chris Achilleos (Target reprint)
- Series: Doctor Who novelisations
- Release number: 16
- Publisher: Frederick Muller Ltd (original publication); Target Books (reprint)
- Publication date: 12 November 1964 (original publication); 2 May 1973 (Target reprint)
- ISBN: 0-426-10110-3

The Daleks was the first Doctor Who serial to be adapted as a novel. Written by David Whitaker, the book was first published in hardback on 12 November 1964 by Frederick Muller Ltd as Doctor Who in an Exciting Adventure with the Daleks. A paperback release by Armada Books followed in October 1965 with a new cover and interior illustrations by Peter Archer. Two international versions of the book were released in 1966: a Dutch hardback edition, Dr Who en de Daleks, was translated by Tuuk Buijtenhuijs; and American and Canadian hardback editions were licensed to Soccer Books and Saunders, respectively. In July 1967, a North American paperback was published by Avon Books, featuring a photomontage cover by Paul Weller.

In 1972, Universal-Tandem Publishing acquired the rights to republish the title as part of the new Target Books range. Renamed Doctor Who and the Daleks, the book was published on 2 May 1973 with a new cover painting of Hartnell. The release also received several translations worldwide. (Note: The book was translated and published in several countries: Doctor Who en de Daleks, translated by Ronald Cohen, was published by Unieboek in Belgium in December 1974.; Doktor Kim ve Dalekler, translated by Reha Pinar, was published by Remzi Kitabevi in Turkey in April 1975.; Jikuu Daikettou! (Big Bloody Space-Time Battle), translated by Yukio Sekiguchi, was published by Hayakawa Publishing Inc. in Japan in March 1980.; Doutor Who E Os Daleks, translated by Conceição Jardim and Eduardo Nogueira, was published by Editorial Presença in 1983.; Docteur Who: Les Daleks, translated by Gilles Bergal, was published by Éditions Garancière in France in May 1987.; Doctor Who und die Invasion der Daleks, translated by Peter Tuscher, was published by Goldmann Verlag in July 1989.) A new version by Virgin Books titled Doctor Who – The Daleks, featuring a cover by Alister Pearson, was issued on 16 January 1992, and a reproduction of the Target book was published on 7 July 2011 with a cover by Chris Achilleos and foreword by fantasy author Neil Gaiman. An illustrated version of the book, with art from Robert Hack, was released on 3 November 2022.

A verbatim transcript of the transmitted version of the serial, edited by John McElroy, was published by Titan Books in December 1989, and reissued in 1992. An audiobook reading of the novelisation, narrated by William Russell, was published by BBC Audiobooks on CD on 7 March 2005, and later reissued on the five-CD set Doctor Who: Travels in Time and Space on 7 November 2005.

=== Soundtrack ===
Doctor Who: The Daleks

Soundtrack album by Tristram Cary
- Released: 15 September 2017
- Genre: Soundtrack
- Length: 50:28
- Label: Silva Screen

Doctor Who soundtrack chronology
| Doctor Who: Series 8 (2015) | Doctor Who: The Daleks (2017) | Doctor Who: Survival (2017) |

Cary's music from this serial was first released on CD as part of Doctor Who: Devils' Planets – The Music of Tristram Cary by BBC Music on 1 September 2003. The music also received an individual CD release, along with sounds by Hodgson and the BBC Radiophonic Workshop, on 15 September 2017.

All tracks are written by Tristram Cary, except where noted.

| No. | Title | Length |
|---|---|---|
| 1. | "Doctor Who (Original Theme)" (Ron Grainer arr. Delia Derbyshire) | 1:25 |
| 2. | "Forest Atmosphere" | 1:08 |
| 3. | "Skaro: Petrified Forest Atmosphere ("Thal Wind")" (Brian Hodgson) | 4:53 |
| 4. | "Forest With Creature" | 0:55 |
| 5. | "City Music 1 & 2" | 0:56 |
| 6. | "Thing In Jungle" | 0:52 |
| 7. | "TARDIS Computer" (Hodgson) | 1:13 |
| 8. | "City Music 3" | 0:43 |
| 9. | "Dalek City Corridor" (Hodgson) | 3:46 |
| 10. | "The Daleks" | 0:33 |
| 11. | "Radiation Sickness" | 0:52 |
| 12. | "Dalek Control Room" (Hodgson) | 3:26 |
| 13. | "The Storm 1 & 2" | 2:01 |
| 14. | "The Storm Continued (Susan Meets Alydon)" | 2:38 |
| 15. | "Inside The City" | 0:27 |
| 16. | "What's Inside A Dalek" | 0:35 |
| 17. | "The Fight" | 1:02 |
| 18. | "The Ambush" | 2:00 |
| 19. | "Fluid Link" | 0:35 |
| 20. | "Rising Tension" | 1:18 |
| 21. | "Demented Dalek" | 0:22 |
| 22. | "The Swamp" | 2:31 |
| 23. | "The Cave 1" | 2:07 |
| 24. | "Barbara Loses The Rope" | 0:18 |
| 25. | "High Sound And Heartbeats (Antodus and Ganatus)" | 2:06 |
| 26. | "Pebble Dropped" | 0:13 |
| 27. | "Captive Of The Daleks" | 0:16 |
| 28. | "Heartbeats (Antodus Falls)" | 2:17 |
| 29. | "The Cave II" | 2:21 |
| 30. | "Capsule Oscillation (Dalek Destructor Fuse/Bomb Countdown)" (Hodgson) | 1:09 |
| 31. | "Explosion/TARDIS Stops" (Hodgson) | 1:10 |
| 32. | "Five Explosions" | 0:31 |
| 33. | "The Ambush (Loop)" | 1:45 |
| 34. | "Funeral Chords" | 0:17 |
| 35. | "Funeral Chords (Alternative)" | 0:32 |
| 36. | "Funeral Chords (Loop)" | 0:36 |
| Total length: | | 50:28 |

== Film version ==
In 1965, the serial was adapted by Milton Subotsky as a film, Dr. Who and the Daleks, starring Peter Cushing as Dr. Who, Roberta Tovey as Susan, Roy Castle as Ian Chesterton and Jennie Linden as Barbara. The film also received a sequel in 1966, Daleks' Invasion Earth 2150 A.D., based on the 1964 serial The Dalek Invasion of Earth.

== The Daleks in Colour ==
A 75-minute colourised version of the serial, titled The Daleks in Colour, was announced on 2 November 2023, to celebrate Doctor Who's 60th anniversary. It features a new score by Mark Ayres, original sound design, and new material written by incumbent showrunner Russell T Davies and recorded by original Dalek voice actor David Graham. Among the new material written by Davies was "Exterminate!", the Daleks' famous battle cry missing from the original story. Davies sought to colourise old Doctor Who serials shortly after returning the role of showrunner in early 2022, considering himself "the curator of a museum in some sense". The Daleks in Colour was edited by Benjamin Cook.

For the colourisation, each character was allocated a colour palette for consistency.

Rich Tipple led the project as lead colourisation artist after Doctor Who executive producers Joel Collins and Phil Collinson saw his fan-made work on YouTube. Production began in November 2022 and ran for ten months; Tipple was joined by Timothy K. Brown, Scott Burditt, and Kieran Highman. Characters had individual colour palettes, and each team member was allocated a different location for consistency: Tipple oversaw the Dalek city, Brown the TARDIS control room, Burditt the caves, and Highman the jungle. The team sought to honour the original serial while making it appealing to new viewers.

Colour photographs from the original filming were consulted but creative license was encouraged; instead of imitating the original sets, the team sought to create a version "if Doctor Who had original Star Trek money to produce something in colour, on colour cameras". Discussions were required for some colours, such as the TARDIS console, which was painted green during filming to avoid camera flare but intended to look white, and Barbara's shirt, which was originally blue but made pink in the colourisation to avoid poor contrast. Some changes included Skaro's red sky becoming green in the evenings.

The Daleks in Colour aired on BBC Four on 23 November to 350,000 overnight and 499,000 consolidated viewers, before becoming available on BBC iPlayer. It was released on DVD and Blu-ray, alongside the original seven-part serial, on 12 February 2024 in the United Kingdom, 19 March in the United States, and 4 September in Australia. It was also available as a SteelBook release. The Telegraph's Tristram Fane Saunders complimented the editing, and praised the original serial's production design, cinematography, and score. Bleeding Cool's Adi Tantimedh lauded the faster pacing for heightening performances and characterisation, though found some cuts too abrupt, flashbacks unnecessary, and picture quality unstable. Comic Book Resources's Andrew Gladman considered Ayres score "a driving force" for the story's faster pace.

=== Soundtrack ===
Doctor Who: The Daleks in Colour

Soundtrack album by Tristram Cary and Mark Ayres
- Released: 13 September 2024
- Genre: Soundtrack
- Length: 145:12
- Label: Silva Screen

Doctor Who soundtrack chronology
| Doctor Who: Revenge of the Cybermen (2023) | Doctor Who: The Daleks in Colour (2024) | Doctor Who: Series 10 (2025) |

Mark Ayres chronology
| Shakedown: Return of the Sontarans (1996) | Doctor Who: The Daleks in Colour (2024) |

Ayres composed the score for The Daleks in Colour. While the production team originally considered a full re-score, Ayres insisted that Cary's original work be retained, as he was friends with Cary and Hodgson. He sought his work to be "both celebration and reinvention: respectful to the original, while not entirely reverential". A soundtrack of The Daleks in Colour, featuring Cary and Ayres's work, was released by Silva Screen Records on 13 September 2024, on digital platforms and as a two-disc set. The first disc features the soundtrack from the serial, while the second (exclusive to the physical release) features unused and alternate tracks.

Disc 1 – The Soundtrack
| No. | Title | Writer(s) | Length |
|---|---|---|---|
| 1. | "Whoniverse" | Murray Gold | 0:15 |
| 2. | "Doctor Who Opening Titles (In Colour Mix, Daleks Version)" | Ron Grainer | 0:30 |
| 3. | "The Petrified Jungle and The City (Soundtrack Version)" | Tristram Cary | 2:51 |
| 4. | "Uninvited Passengers" | Cary | 1:14 |
| 5. | "No Alternative" | Cary | 0:31 |
| 6. | "The Box" | Cary | 0:28 |
| 7. | "To the City" | Cary, Mark Ayres | 0:54 |
| 8. | "Inside the City (1) (Soundtrack Version – The Labyrinth and the Lift / Barbara Captured)" | Cary, Ayres | 2:45 |
| 9. | "Inside the City (2) (Soundtrack Version – Radiation Poisoning / The Daleks / The Cell / Interrogation)" | Cary, Ayres | 7:33 |
| 10. | "The Doctor Returns to the Cell" | Cary | 0:07 |
| 11. | "Mutations" | Cary | 0:38 |
| 12. | "Which One of You is Going?" | Cary | 1:46 |
| 13. | "Susan Departs" | Ayres | 0:32 |
| 14. | "Before the Storm" | Ayres | 0:16 |
| 15. | "The Storm / Susan and Alydon (Soundtrack Version)" | Cary | 4:56 |
| 16. | "Susan Returns to the City / The Thals / Fake Treaty (Soundtrack Version)" | Cary, Ayres | 5:09 |
| 17. | "The Message / He's Coming (Soundtrack Version)" | Cary, Ayres | 0:41 |
| 18. | "Capturing a Dalek (A&B) (Soundtrack Version)" | Cary, Ayres | 1:57 |
| 19. | "Insides Out" | Cary | 0:51 |
| 20. | "Ian the Dalek (Soundtrack Version)" | Cary, Ayres | 2:51 |
| 21. | "It's Empty" | Ayres | 0:32 |
| 22. | "Ambush and Aftermath (Soundtrack Version)" | Cary, Ayres | 6:44 |
| 23. | "Something to Fight For (Soundtrack Version)" | Cary, Ayres | 1:16 |
| 24. | "Demented Dalek / Another Neutron Bomb (Soundtrack Version)" | Cary, Ayres | 1:33 |
| 25. | "The Expedition and The Swamp Monster (Soundtrack Version)" | Cary, Ayres | 4:06 |
| 26. | "After The Swamp Monster / The Cave / The Drop (Soundtrack Version)" | Cary, Ayres | 3:37 |
| 27. | "The Jump (Soundtrack Version)" | Cary, Ayres | 2:25 |
| 28. | "Heartbeats (Soundtrack Version)" | Cary | 1:08 |
| 29. | "The Fall (Soundtrack Version)" | Ayres | 1:58 |
| 30. | "The Arising" | Ayres | 1:24 |
| 31. | "The Final War Part 1" | Ayres | 4:52 |
| 32. | "The Final War Part 2" | Ayres | 1:46 |
| 33. | "Our Destiny is in the Stars (End Montage and Titles: "The Wedding of River Song")" | Gold | 1:11 |
| Total length: | | | 69:17 |

Disc 2 – The Extras (CD exclusive)
| No. | Title | Writer(s) | Length |
|---|---|---|---|
| 1. | "Doctor Who Opening Titles (In Colour Mix)" | Grainer | 0:37 |
| 2. | "The Petrified Jungle and The City (Album Version)" | Cary | 2:59 |
| 3. | "The Labyrinth and The Lift (Unused Version 1)" | Ayres | 2:25 |
| 4. | "Barbara Enters the City / The Labyrinth and The Lift (Unused Version 2)" | Ayres | 2:37 |
| 5. | "Barbara Enters the City / The Labyrinth and The Lift (Version 3 as used)" | Ayres | 2:48 |
| 6. | "Radiation Poisoning / The Daleks (Album Mix)" | Ayres | 4:02 |
| 7. | "City Music and Tolling Pedal" | Cary | 0:53 |
| 8. | "The Daleks / The Cell / The Doctor Interrogated" | Cary | 5:39 |
| 9. | "The Interrogation (Master Cue)" | Ayres | 1:51 |
| 10. | "Susan in the Jungle (Instrumental Cue)" | Cary | 1:29 |
| 11. | "Susan in the TARDIS (Instrumental Cue)" | Cary | 0:36 |
| 12. | "Susan Returns to the City (Master Cue)" | Cary | 1:40 |
| 13. | "The Thals (Master Cue)" | Ayres | 2:17 |
| 14. | "Fake Treaty (Master Cue)" | Cary, Ayres | 1:58 |
| 15. | "The Message (Unused Version 1)" | Ayres | 0:37 |
| 16. | "The Message (Version 2 as used)" | Ayres | 0:37 |
| 17. | "Capturing a Dalek (A)" | Cary | 1:56 |
| 18. | "Capturing a Dalek (B)" | Ayres | 1:39 |
| 19. | "Dalek Creature" | Cary | 0:18 |
| 20. | "Ian the Dalek (Master Cue)" | Ayres | 2:40 |
| 21. | "Ambush and Aftermath (Main Cue, Version 1)" | Cary, Ayres | 6:16 |
| 22. | "The Ambush (Daleks 2023 Edit)" | Cary | 1:58 |
| 23. | "Ian and The Thals Parts 1–3" | Ayres | 2:04 |
| 24. | "Rising Tension / Demented Dalek (Daleks 2023 Edit)" | Cary | 1:17 |
| 25. | "Another Neutron Bomb (Master Cue)" | Ayres | 1:19 |
| 26. | "The Expedition and The Swamp Monster (Master Cue)" | Ayres | 4:05 |
| 27. | "The Swamp Monster (Alternative Ending)" | Ayres | 0:44 |
| 28. | "After the Swamp Monster (Master Cue)" | Ayres | 0:34 |
| 29. | "The Cave / Barbara Loses the Rope" | Cary | 2:11 |
| 30. | "The Drop (Master Cue)" | Ayres | 2:29 |
| 31. | "The Jump (Master Cue)" | Ayres | 2:34 |
| 32. | "The Fall (Master Cue)" | Ayres | 2:13 |
| 33. | "The Arising (Master Cue)" | Ayres | 1:30 |
| 34. | "The Final War (Unused Version 1)" | Ayres | 7:03 |
| Total length: | | | 75:55 |

== Bibliography ==
- Ainsworth, John, ed. (2015). "100,000 BC and The Mutants (aka The Daleks)". Doctor Who: The Complete History. 1 (4). London: Panini Comics, Hachette Partworks. ISSN 2057-6048.
- Cornell, Paul; Day, Martin; Topping, Keith (1995). The Discontinuity Guide. London: Virgin Books. ISBN 0-426-20442-5.
- Dunlop, Robbie (February 2024). "Palette of the Daleks". SFX. No. 375. Future plc. pp. 50–53. ISSN 1749-6969. OCLC 813632043.
- Howe, David J.; Stammers, Mark; Walker, Stephen James (1994). The Handbook: The First Doctor – The William Hartnell Years 1963–1966. Virgin Books. ISBN 0-426-20430-1.
- Howe, David J.; Walker, Stephen James (1998). Doctor Who: The Television Companion: Volume 1 (2021 ed.). London: BBC Books. ISBN 978-1-845-83156-1.
- Molesworth, Richard (2010). Wiped! Doctor Who's Missing Episodes. Surrey: Telos Publishing. ISBN 978-1845830373.
- Muir, John Kenneth (1999). A Critical History of Doctor Who on Television. Jefferson, North Carolina: McFarland & Company. ISBN 978-0-786-40442-1.
