= C. E. Webber =

British television writer and playwright (1909–1969)

- Born: Cecil Edwin Webber; 9 April 1909; England
- Died: 26 June 1969 (aged 60); Midhurst, Sussex, England
- Occupations: Television writer, playwright
- Known for: Co-creator of Doctor Who

Cecil Edwin Webber (sometimes known by the nickname "Bunny"; 9 April 1909 – 26 June 1969) was a British television writer and playwright. He is best remembered as one of the co-creators of the science-fiction series Doctor Who while working as a staff writer for the BBC in the early 1960s.

== Doctor Who ==
Webber participated in many crucial early development meetings, and co-wrote the first format document for the series with Donald Wilson and Sydney Newman. Webber and his scripts were ultimately not used as he was felt to not be capable of "writing down" to the level required of the programme. However, his draft script for the proposed first episode formed the basis of the broadcast first episode eventually written by Anthony Coburn. Webber received a co-writer's credit on internal BBC documentation for the episode, although not on screen.

Webber submitted a Doctor Who pilot entitled "Nothing at the end of the Lane", suggested in early May 1963 under the programme's developing format guide. The story would feature Biddy and her teachers, Lola and Cliff, who would encounter Biddy's grandfather, "Doctor Who", and his time machine. "Nothing at the end of the Lane" was soon replaced by Webber's The Giants, which would be a four-part serial to be directed by Rex Tucker. The story would feature Lola and Cliff in search of their student, Sue, and meet an old man in the fog. Calling him "Dr. Who", they find out that his home is a time machine disguised as a police telephone box. Unexpectedly, they are shrunken to an eighth of an inch in size. They then go to Cliff's laboratory and are menaced by a microscope lens, spiders, a student's compass, and caterpillars. Cliff manages to communicate with the students, and both return to Dr. Who's time machine.

In production, the names of the companions changed to Ian, Barbara and Susan, while the Doctor's name, "Dr. Who", would go unused. The Giants was abandoned in June 1963 in favour of An Unearthly Child, because Doctor Who creator Sydney Newman disliked the idea of putting caterpillars and spiders as monsters in the story.

== Other work ==
Webber's published stage plays included Be Good, Sweet Maid (1957), Out of the Frying Pan (1960) and The Mortal Bard (1964).

Other television shows he wrote or created for the BBC included the 1961 action adventure serial Hurricane, the 1962 children's comedy William, starring Dennis Waterman, based on the books by Richmal Crompton, and in 1964 episodes of the Thorndyke detective series.
