= Red Cockade =

Red Cockade may refer to:

- Cockade, a rosette or knot worn as an ornament
- Cockade of France, the national ornament of France, red, white, and blue
- Cockade of Italy, the national ornament of Italy, red, white, and green
- The Red Cockade, 1895 historical novel by Stanley J. Weyman

== See also ==
- Red-cockaded woodpecker
