= Ovington's Bank =

1922 novel by Stanley John Weyman

Ovington's Bank is a novel by the English historical novelist Stanley John Weyman, set during an 1825 banking crisis. It was published in London in 1922 by John Murray. It was revived in paperback 2012 and 2015 after the 2008 financial crisis. It was published in hardback in 2018 with a 24-page critical biography of Weyman.

== Setting and plot ==
The novel is set immediately before and during the British Panic of 1825, which was caused largely by a fraud involving "Poyais", an invented South American country. As a result, about 70 banks failed. The novel follows the effects of the events on two fictional English communities named Aldersbury and Garth.

Weyman, still a well-known novelist in the period when he wrote the book, describes the conflict between the old-established rural gentry, whose wealth is drawn as landowners exploiting large estates, and the striving business classes, drawing theirs from banking and industry.

The novel, set a century before publication, has a conventional plot involving an exaltation of honesty and love as a way of overcoming pride and prejudice. It stresses that the bank had been run very carefully. As a recent scholar put it, the bank was "solvent, amply solvent", but customers "would rush in at the first alarm, like a flock of silly sheep... each bent on his own safety, blindly on ruin." Another recent commentator has called it a notable attempt "to depict the ways in which urbanization and Reform politics had helped to shape the broad outlines of the Victorian world."

== Televised ==
The novel was adapted for BBC television in 1965 as Heiress of Garth in six episodes of 25 minutes. The director was Paddy Russell and the cast included Bernard Archard, William Mervyn, June Ritchie, Mary Webster and David Weston. The story editor was Betty Willingale and the writing was by Anthony Coburn, based on the Stanley J. Weyman novel.
