= Anthony Coburn =

Australian television writer and producer

- Born: James Anthony Coburn; 10 December 1927; Melbourne, Victoria, Australia
- Died: 28 April 1977 (aged 49); Canterbury, Kent, England
- Occupations: Television producer, television screenwriter

James Anthony Coburn (10 December 1927 – 28 April 1977) was an Australian television writer and producer, who spent much of his professional career living and working in the United Kingdom. He is best remembered for writing the first Doctor Who story, An Unearthly Child.

He also wrote the stage play The Bastard Country.

== Doctor Who ==
He moved to the UK around 1950, where he joined the staff of BBC Television. While working as a staff writer for the BBC in 1963 and living in Herne Bay, Kent, he became involved in the early development of the science-fiction series Doctor Who.

He liaised closely with the series' first story editor, David Whitaker, on establishing the format and characters of the show, which had been initiated by various BBC drama executives before being handed on to the new production team. It is believed to have been Coburn's idea for the Doctor's travelling companion, Susan, to be his granddaughter, as he was disturbed by the possible sexual connotations of an old man travelling with an unrelated teenager.

Coburn wrote four full serials for the programme, An Unearthly Child, The Robots (also known as The Masters of Luxor) and two other unnamed scripts. Only An Unearthly Child was produced and it was the first Doctor Who serial to be made, despite both Coburn and the production team's misgivings about its prehistoric settings. The Robots was continually delayed and put back in production order, and then finally rejected – following this, Coburn severed his links with the show.

=== The Masters of Luxor ===
On 18 June 1963, Coburn was commissioned to write The Robots, which was recommissioned on 3 July. The story would see the travellers land on thirteenth-century Earth, then by the end of the month, it changed to a planet. The production team were unhappy with The Robots. So, on 23 September, they decided to switch productions with the intended fifth serial, The Daleks.

Coburn, however, turned the project and changed the story to The Masters of Luxor.

The story would see the Doctor, Ian, Barbara, and Susan landed the TARDIS on the moons of Luxor, after they find a strange light signal. They discover that the moon is dominated by robots led by "The Perfect One". "The Perfect One" was experimenting on people to discover the secret of life – which his servants kidnap Barbara and Susan as test subjects. Meanwhile, the Doctor and Ian escape into the wilderness and awaken Tabon, the creator of "The Perfect One". Tabon then confronts "The Perfect One" about making experimentations, causing the robots to get out of control. The robots kill Tabon, and destroy "The Perfect One". Barbara and Susan are then freed and rescued by the Doctor and Ian, and then head back to the time machine.

However, the story was dropped due to schedule difficulties.

In August 1992, Titan Books released The Masters of Luxor as a Doctor Who Script Book, edited by John McElroy. In August 2012, Big Finish Productions released an audio adaptation of The Masters of Luxor by Nigel Robinson.

== Later work ==
He was the co-creator of Warship with Ian Mackintosh, a popular British television drama series that centred on the Royal Navy. The programme was aired by the BBC between 1973 and 1977. A book was also published in 1973 to coincide with the series. Another of his assignments was the 1965, six-part series Heiress of Garth, based on the novel Ovington's Bank by Stanley J. Weyman.

Coburn produced the original pilot episode of The Onedin Line; his tasks included searching many inlets and harbours before finally finding, in Dartmouth, Devon, the schooner that would be the Charlotte Rhodes.

== Death ==
He died in 1977 of a heart attack while producing the second series of the BBC period drama Poldark, and was due to move on to produce the final season of Z-Cars. Prior to his death, he finished writing a science fiction disaster novel called Gargantua, the first of a planned trilogy based on a rejected BBC pitch. It was published posthumously in 1977.

In 2023, there was a proposal to install a memorial about him in his home town of Herne Bay.

== Writing credits ==
Year	Title	Notes
1960	Knight Errant Limited	Episode: "The Conspirators"
1961	They Made History	Episode: "Ronald Ross"
1961	The Watching Cat	TV film starring Jacqueline Hill
1963	BBC Sunday-Night Play	Episode: "She's a Free Country"
1963	Dr. Finlay's Casebook	Episode: "A Time for Laughing"
1963	Maigret	Episode: "The Crime at Lock 14"
1963	Doctor Who	Serial: An Unearthly Child
1964	The Children of the New Forest	5 episodes
1965	Heiress of Garth	6 episodes
1965–1966	The Newcomers	31 episodes
1966	King of the River	Episode: "By Guess and by God"
1967	Emergency Ward 10	Episode: "A Family Likeness"
1967–1968	Vendetta	3 episodes
1970	The Borderers	Episode: "Plot Counterplot"
1971	The View from Daniel Pike	Episode: "So This is Olympus"
1973	Sutherland's Law	Episode: "The Sea"
1973	Warship	Co-created with Ian Mackintosh
