= An Unearthly Child =

First Doctor Who serial

001 – An Unearthly Child
- Doctor Who serial
- Ian and Barbara find the Doctor and Susan inside the TARDIS as its interior is revealed in a scene described as "breathtaking"

Cast
- Doctor: William Hartnell – First Doctor
- Companions: William Russell – Ian Chesterton; Jacqueline Hill – Barbara Wright; Carole Ann Ford – Susan Foreman
- Others: Derek Newark – Za; Alethea Charlton – Hur; Eileen Way – Old Mother; Jeremy Young – Kal; Howard Lang – Horg

Production
- Directed by: Waris Hussein
- Written by: Anthony Coburn; C. E. Webber (episode 1)
- Script editor: David Whitaker
- Produced by: Verity Lambert
- Music by: Norman Kay
- Production code: A
- Series: Season 1
- Running time: 4 episodes, 25 minutes each
- First broadcast: 23 November 1963
- Last broadcast: 14 December 1963

Chronology
← Preceded by —	Followed by → The Daleks

An Unearthly Child (sometimes referred to as 100,000 BC) is the first serial of the British science fiction television series Doctor Who. It was first broadcast on BBC TV in four weekly parts from 23 November to 14 December 1963. Scripted by Australian writer Anthony Coburn, the serial introduces William Hartnell as the First Doctor and his original companions: Carole Ann Ford as the Doctor's granddaughter, Susan Foreman, with Jacqueline Hill and William Russell as school teachers Barbara Wright and Ian Chesterton. The first episode deals with Ian and Barbara's discovery of the Doctor and his time-space ship, the TARDIS, in a junkyard in contemporary London, and the remaining episodes are set amid a power struggle between warring Stone Age factions who have lost the secret of making fire.

The show was created to fill a gap between children's and young adult programming. Canadian producer Sydney Newman, recently made Head of Drama at the BBC, was tasked with creating the show, with heavy contributions from Donald Wilson and C. E. Webber. Newman conceived the idea of the TARDIS, as well as the central character of the Doctor. Production was led by Verity Lambert, the BBC drama department's first female producer, and the serial was directed by Waris Hussein. Following several delays, the first episode was recorded in September 1963 on 405-line black and white videotape, but was re-recorded the following month due to several technical and performance errors. Several changes were made to the show's costuming, effects, performances, and scripts throughout production.

The show's launch was overshadowed by the assassination of American President John F. Kennedy the previous day, resulting in a repeat of the first episode the following week. The serial received mixed reviews, and the four episodes attracted an average of six million viewers. Retrospective reviews of the serial are favourable. It later received several print adaptations and home media releases.

== Plot ==
At Coal Hill School, teachers Ian Chesterton and Barbara Wright have concerns about pupil Susan Foreman, who has an alien outlook on England. When the teachers visit her address to investigate, they find a police box and hear Susan's voice inside, as an elderly man arrives and refuses to let the teachers into the police box. They force their way in to find Susan inside a technologically advanced control room that is larger than the police box exterior. Susan explains that the object is a time and space machine called the TARDIS and the old man is her grandfather, who reveals that he and his granddaughter are exiles from their own planet. Refusing to let Ian and Barbara leave, he sets the TARDIS in flight and the ship goes through time and space to the Stone Age.

Za, the leader of a primitive Paleolithic tribe, attempts to make fire. A young woman called Hur warns him that if he fails to do so, the stranger called Kal will be made leader. After exiting the TARDIS, the unnamed old man, whom Ian and Barbara refer to as "the Doctor", is ambushed by Kal, when he witnesses him light a match. Kal takes the Doctor back to the tribe and threatens to kill him if he does not make fire; Ian, Barbara, and Susan intervene, but the group is imprisoned in a large cave. With the help of Old Mother, who believes that fire will bring death to the tribe, they escape from the settlement but are intercepted and recaptured before reaching the TARDIS. Kal says they will be sacrificed if they do not make fire. While Ian tries to start a fire, Kal enters the cave and attacks Za, but is killed. Ian gives a burning torch to Za, who shows it to the tribe and declares himself leader. Susan notices that placing a skull over a burning torch makes it appear alive; when the tribe enters the cave, they are faced with several burning skulls and are terrified, allowing the group to flee to the TARDIS and escape through time and space to a silent and unknown forest. Unnoticed by the crew as they leave the ship to investigate, the radiation meter rises to "Danger".

== Production ==
=== Conception ===
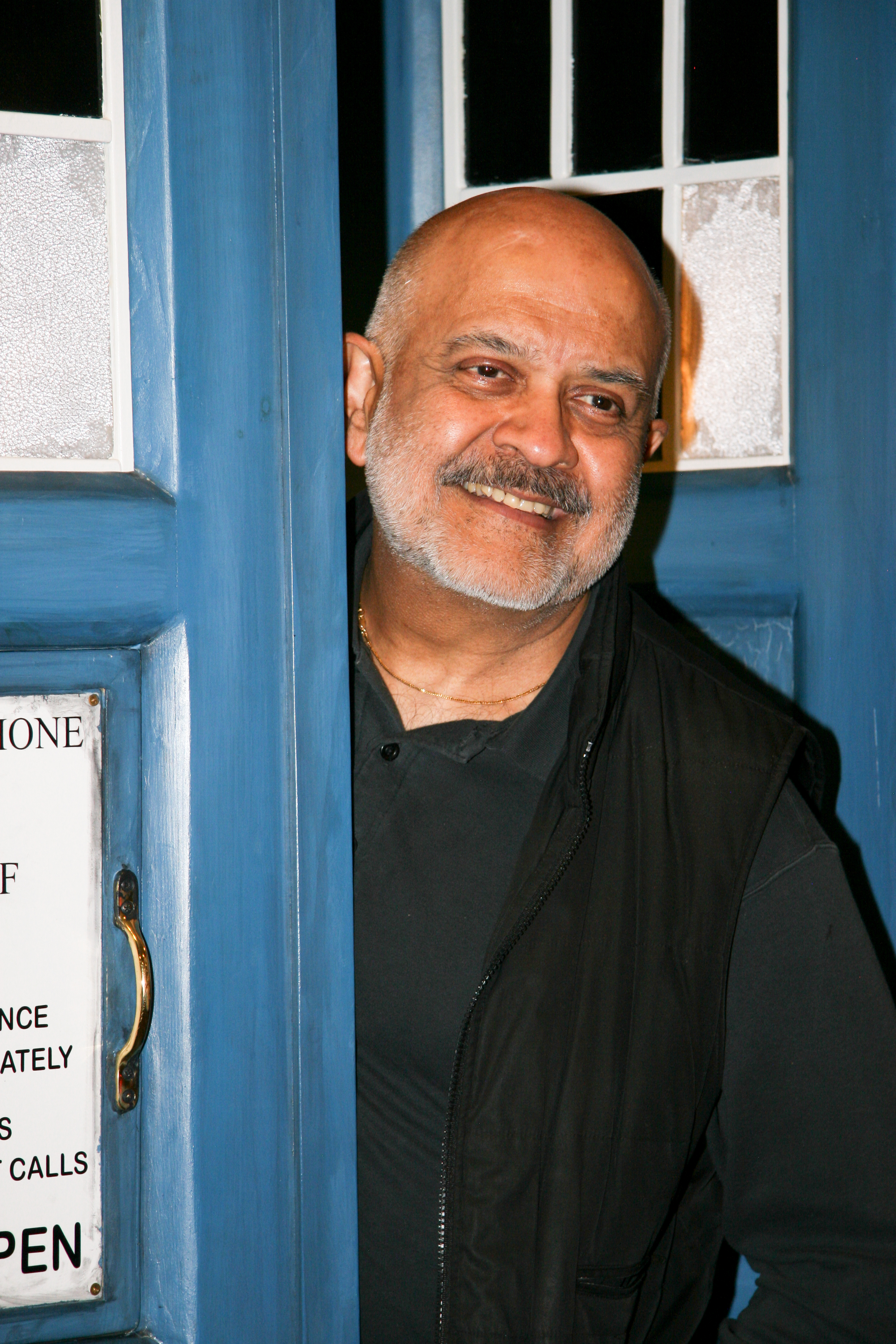
An Unearthly Child was directed by Waris Hussein (pictured in 2011).

In March 1963, BBC Television's Controller of Programmes Donald Baverstock informed Head of Drama Sydney Newman of a gap in the schedule on Saturday evenings between the sports showcase Grandstand and the pop music programme Juke Box Jury. Baverstock figured that the programme should appeal to three audiences: children who had previously been accustomed to viewing television during the timeslot, the teenage audience of Juke Box Jury, and the adult sports fan audience of Grandstand. Newman decided that a science fiction programme should fill the gap. Head of the Script Department Donald Wilson and writer C.E. Webber contributed heavily to the formatting of the programme, and co-wrote the programme's first format document with Newman; the latter conceived the idea of a time machine larger on the inside than the outside, as well as the central character of the mysterious "Doctor", and the name Doctor Who. (Note: Hugh David, an actor initially considered for the role of the Doctor and later a director on the programme, claimed that Rex Tucker coined the title Doctor Who. Tucker said that it was Newman who had done so.) Production was initiated several months later and handed to producer Verity Lambert—the BBC's first female drama producer (Note: Others had previously been credited as producers, including Naomi Capon and Chloe Gibson, but their roles were akin to directors; their titles reflected as such after Newman's reorganisation of the department.)—and story editor David Whitaker to oversee, after a brief period when the show had been handled by a "caretaker" producer, Rex Tucker.

=== Casting and characters ===
In Webber's original production documents, the Doctor (referred to as "Dr. Who") was a suspicious and malign character who hated scientists and inventors, and had a secret intention to destroy or nullify the future; Newman rejected this idea, wanting the character to be a father figure. Tucker offered the role of the Doctor to Hugh David; having spent a year working on Knight Errant Limited and not wanting to be tied to another series, David turned down the role. Tucker envisioned a young actor to play the Doctor with aged make-up; however, Lambert favoured an older actor to avoid preparation time and add authenticity to the role. The part was turned down by actors Leslie French, Cyril Cusack, Alan Webb, and Geoffrey Bayldon; Cusack and Webb were reluctant to work for a year on a series, while Bayldon wished to avoid another "old man" role. Lambert and director Waris Hussein invited William Hartnell to play the role; after several discussions, Hartnell accepted, viewing it as an opportunity to take his career in a new direction.

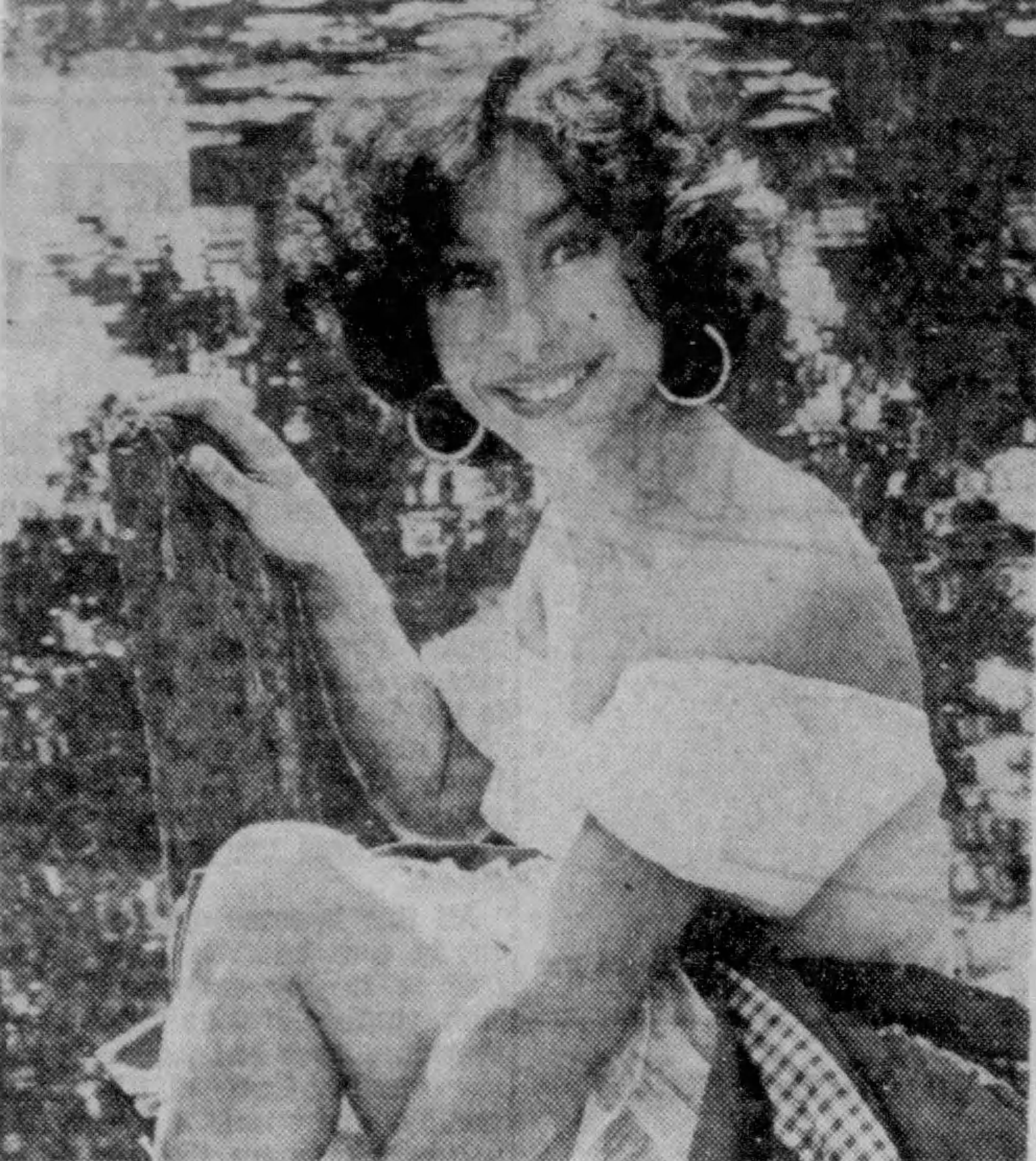
Carole Ann Ford (pictured in 1963) was chosen to portray the Doctor's granddaughter Susan Foreman.

The Doctor's companion was originally named Bridget or "Biddy", a 15-year-old girl eager for life. Her teachers were Miss Lola McGovern, a 24-year-old timid woman capable of sudden courage, and Cliff, a "physically perfect, strong and courageous" man. Bridget was renamed Suzan/Suzanne Foreman, later changed to Susan, and writer Anthony Coburn made her the Doctor's granddaughter to avoid any possibility of sexual impropriety implicit in having a young girl travelling with an older man; Newman was reluctant about the idea, as he wanted the character to have human naivety. Miss McGovern later became history teacher Miss Canning, and Susan's birth name briefly became "Findooclare". When the show's bible was written, the two teachers were renamed Ian Chesterton and Barbara Wright. Chesterton was much more violent in earlier drafts of the script.

William Russell was chosen to portray Ian, being the only actor considered by Lambert to do so. Tucker held auditions for the roles of Susan and Barbara on 25 June 1963; actresses Christa Bergmann, Anne Castaldini, Maureen Crombie, Heather Fleming, Camilla Hasse, Waveney Lee, Anna Palk, and Anneke Wills (who later played companion Polly) were all considered for the role of Susan, while Sally Home, Phyllida Law, and Penelope Lee were considered for Barbara. Following Tucker's departure from production, Lambert was in talks with actress Jacqueline Lenya to play Susan, (Note: Lenya, then known as Jackie Lane, was later cast as companion Dodo Chaplet in 1965.) but the role was ultimately given to Carole Ann Ford, a 23-year-old who typically played younger roles. Lambert's friend Jacqueline Hill was chosen to play Barbara.

=== Writing ===
The programme was originally intended to open with a serial entitled The Giants, written by Webber, but was scrapped by June 1963 as the technical requirements of the storyline—which involved the leading characters being drastically reduced in size—were beyond their capabilities, and the story itself lacked the necessary impact for an opener. Due to the lack of scripts ready for production, the untitled second serial from Coburn was moved to first in the running order. The order change necessitated rewriting the opening episode of Coburn's script to include some introductory elements of Webber's script for the first episode of The Giants. Coburn also made several significant original contributions to the opening episode, mostly notably that the Doctor's time machine should resemble a police box, an idea he conceived after seeing a real police box while walking near his office.

=== Filming ===
The show remained unnamed in April 1963, simply referred to as The Saturday Serial. It was provisionally scheduled to begin recording on 5 July, to be aired on 27 July, but was delayed. A pilot recording was scheduled to begin filming on 19 July; if successful, it could be broadcast on 24 August. Production was later deferred for a further two weeks while scripts were prepared, and the recording on 19 July was rescheduled as a test session for the dematerialisation effect of the TARDIS. The show's initial broadcast date was pushed back to 9 November, with the pilot recording scheduled for 27 September and regular episodes made from 18 October; the broadcast date was soon pushed back to 16 November, due to the BBC's athletics coverage in July pushing subsequent Saturday transmissions back a week, and later to 23 November. The show was granted a budget of £2,300 per episode (equivalent to £42,000 in 2025), with an additional £500 for the construction of the TARDIS (equivalent to £9,100 in 2025).

William Hartnell and Carole Ann Ford in the original recording of the first episode, which was later scrapped due to technical issues. Several changes were made before the final recording, including the Doctor's costumes and mannerisms: his suit and tie were replaced with an Edwardian outfit, and he became more affectionate towards Susan.

Tucker was originally selected as the serial's director, but the task was assigned to Hussein following Tucker's departure from production. Some of the pre-filmed inserts for the serial, shot at Ealing Studios in September and October 1963, were directed by Hussein's production assistant Douglas Camfield. The first version of the opening episode was recorded at Lime Grove Studios on the evening of 27 September 1963, following a week of rehearsals. However, the recording was bedevilled with technical errors, including the doors leading into the TARDIS control room failing to close properly. After viewing the episode, Newman ordered that it be mounted again. During the weeks between the two tapings, changes were made to costuming, effects, performances, and scripts. (Note: The original episode, retroactively referred to as the "pilot episode", was not broadcast on television until 26 August 1991.) The second attempt at the opening episode was recorded on 18 October, with the following three episodes being recorded weekly from 25 October to 8 November. Recording for the five episodes (including the pilot) cost a total of £13,693, (Note: The pilot recording cost £2,143.16, and the four episodes cost £2,746, £4,307, £2,181,, and £2,316 respectively.) which Lambert noted was within the programme's budget.

== Themes and analysis ==
Scholar Mark Bould discusses how the serial establishes Doctor Who's socio-political stances in his 2008 essay "Science Fiction Television in the United Kingdom". He writes, "The story represents the separation/reunion, capture/escape, pursuit/evasion that will dominate the next twenty-six years, as well as the programme's consistent advocacy of the BBC's political and social liberalism." He cites Ian and Barbara's attempt to teach a cavewoman kindness, friendship, and democracy, writing "a tyrant is not as strong as the whole tribe acting collectively". Scholar John R. Cook reflected in 1999 that the presence of teachers as companions echoes Doctor Who's original educational remit. Malcolm Peltu of New Scientist noted in 1982 that the serial was set in the Stone Age because the show's original intention was "to bring to life the Earth's history".

Lawrence Miles and Tat Wood argue that the cavemen's focus on fire is meant to stand in for all technology, thus linking the latter three episodes with the questions of generational change raised by the first episode and its focus on suspicion of children, and tying that to a discussion of technological progress, including the nuclear bomb. They also argue that, contrary to the tendency to treat the story as a one-episode introduction to the series followed by "three episodes of running around and escaping" that the piece should be considered as a single, dramatic whole that is "about making four people who barely know one another learn to trust each other".

== Reception ==
=== Broadcast and ratings ===
Episode	Title	Run time	Original release date	UK viewers (millions)	Appreciation Index
1	"An Unearthly Child"	23:24	23 November 1963	4.4	63
2	"The Cave of Skulls"	24:26	30 November 1963	5.9	59
3	"The Forest of Fear"	23:38	7 December 1963	6.9	56
4	"The Firemaker"	24:22	14 December 1963	6.4	55

The first episode was transmitted at 5:16:20 p.m. on Saturday 23 November 1963. The assassination of U.S. President John F. Kennedy the previous day overshadowed the launch of the series; as a result, the first episode was repeated a week later, on 30 November, preceding the second episode. The first episode was watched by 4.4 million viewers (9.1% of the viewing audience), and it received a score of 63 on the Appreciation Index; the repeat of the first episode reached a larger audience of six million viewers. Across its four episodes, An Unearthly Child was watched by an average of 6 million (12.3% of potential viewers). Episodes 2–4 achieved ratings of 5.9, 6.9, and 6.4 million viewers, respectively. Mark Bould suggests that a disappointing audience reaction and high production costs prompted the BBC's chief of programmes to cancel the series until the Daleks, introduced in the second serial in December 1963, were immediately popular with viewers.

The serial has been repeated twice on the BBC: on BBC2 in November 1981, as part of the repeat season The Five Faces of Doctor Who, achieving average audience figures of 4.3 million viewers; (Note: The 1982 broadcast of the serial achieved viewing figures of 4.6, 4.3, 4.4, and 3.9 million viewers, respectively.) and on BBC Four as part of the show's 50th anniversary on 21 November 2013, achieving an average of 630,000 viewers. (Note: The 2013 broadcast of the serial achieved viewing figures of 0.83, 0.71, 0.52, and 0.46 million, respectively.)

=== Critical response ===
The serial initially received mixed reviews from television critics. Michael Gower of the Daily Mail wrote a short favourable review of the first episode, claiming that the ending "must have delighted the hearts of the Telegoons who followed". A reviewer in the Daily Worker stated that they "intend following closely" to the show, describing the ending as "satisfying". Variety felt the script "suffered from a glibness of characterizations which didn't carry the burden of belief", but praised the "effective camera-work" and eerie sound effects, noting the show "will impress if it decides to establish a firm base in realism". After the second episode, Mary Crozier of The Guardian was unimpressed by the serial, stating that it "has fallen off badly soon after getting underway"; she felt that the first episode "got off the ground predictably, but there was little to thrill", while the second was "a depressing sequel ... wigs and furry pelts and clubs were all ludicrous". Conversely, Marjorie Norris of Television Today commented that if the show "keeps up the high standard of the first two episodes it will capture a much wider audience".

Retrospective reviews are mostly positive towards An Unearthly Child. In 1980, John Peel described the story as "a work of loving craftsmanship, worked out to perfection by all concerned". Referring to the serial while discussing the early years of Doctor Who in 1982, New Scientist's Peltu praised the script, acting, and direction, but criticised the dated scenery. In The Discontinuity Guide (1995), Paul Cornell, Martin Day, and Keith Topping described the first episode as "twenty-five of the most important minutes in British television", particularly praising the directorial techniques, but felt that the following three episodes declined in quality. In The Television Companion (1998), David J. Howe and Stephen James Walker lauded Hartnell's performance and the reveal of the TARDIS interior in the first episode, and felt that the following three episodes were lesser in quality but remained "intense" and "highly dramatic". In A Critical History of Doctor Who (1999), John Kenneth Muir called the serial "an unqualified success as drama", applauding the writing, cinematic style, and production techniques.

In 2008, Radio Times reviewer Patrick Mulkern praised the casting of Hartnell, the "moody" direction, and the "thrilling" race back to the TARDIS. Christopher Bahn of The A.V. Club in 2010 labelled An Unearthly Child an essential serial to watch for background on the programme. In his review, he noted that the first episode is "brilliantly done; the next three together could be about a half-hour shorter but get the job done". He praised the characters of Ian, Barbara, and the mysterious Doctor, but noted that he was far from the character he would become and Susan was "something of a cipher" with the hope she would develop later. In a 2006 review, DVD Talk's John Sinnott called the first episode "excellent", but felt the "story goes down hill a bit" with the introduction of the prehistoric time period. He cited the slower pace, the discussions in "Tarzan-speak", and the lack of tension or high stakes.

== Commercial releases ==
=== In print ===
Doctor Who and an Unearthly Child
- Author: Terrance Dicks
- Cover artist: Andrew Skilleter
- Series: Doctor Who book: Target novelisations
- Release number: 68
- Publisher: Target Books
- Publication date: 15 October 1981
- ISBN: 0-426-20144-2

Writer David Whitaker omitted An Unearthly Child from the first spin-off novelisation, Doctor Who in an Exciting Adventure with the Daleks (later retitled Doctor Who and the Daleks and Doctor Who – The Daleks), with Ian and Barbara's entrance into the TARDIS leading directly into an adaptation of the second televised serial, The Daleks. Historian James Chapman highlights this as a reason that, in an age before home video, many people believed the Dalek serial to be the first Doctor Who story because the novelisations published by Target Books were the "closest that fans had to the original programmes". (Note: Cornell, Day & Topping (1993) reported that the second serial overshadowed An Unearthly Child to such an extent that many people believed that Terry Nation, writer of The Daleks, created Doctor Who; this error became so prevalent that it was mistakenly included in an edition of the board game Trivial Pursuit.) Terrance Dicks wrote the Target novelisation of this story, initially published as Doctor Who and an Unearthly Child on 15 October 1981 with a cover by Andrew Skilleter. The release also received several translations worldwide. (Note: The novel was translated to different languages: The French version with the title Docteur Who Entre en scène (Doctor Who Takes the Stage) was translated by Jean-Daniel Brèque and published in February 1987; The German version Doctor Who und das Kind von den Sternen (Doctor Who and the Child from the Stars) was translated by Bettina Zeller and published in 1990.) A verbatim transcript of the transmitted version of this serial, edited by John McElroy and titled The Tribe of Gum, was published by Titan Books in January 1988. It was the first in an intended series of Doctor Who script books. In 1994, a phonecard with a photomontage of the episode was released by Jondar International Promotions.

=== Home media ===
The story was originally released on VHS on 5 February 1990, with a cover designed by Alister Pearson. The unaired pilot was released as part of The Hartnell Years on 3 June 1991, and with Doctor Who: The Edge of Destruction and Dr Who: The Pilot Episode on 1 May 2000. A remastered version of the serial was also released on VHS on 4 September 2000; for the DVD release on 30 January 2006, the serial was released as part of Doctor Who: The Beginning alongside the following two serials, with several special features, including audio commentaries and comedy sketches. It was also released in the US and Canada on 27 May 2014 as part of the Blu-ray set for An Adventure in Space and Time.

In October 2023, the BBC announced that An Unearthly Child would not be available on its iPlayer service the following month alongside other Doctor Who episodes as it did not hold the entire copyright. Coburn's son, Stef Coburn, claimed he had withdrawn the licensing rights following disagreements over compensation. Stef Coburn had previously requested recognition and compensation for his father's work in 2013 but said he did not wish to withdraw licensing rights at the time. He had since lambasted the programme's direction, claiming in 2023 that his father would be "outrage[d] at what generations of progressively more corrupted BBC filth have done", in response to the casting of actors Ncuti Gatwa and Jinkx Monsoon. Scenes featuring dialogue from An Unearthly Child were removed from the 2023 repeat of An Adventure in Space and Time, which many attributed to the licensing issues.

== Bibliography ==
- Ainsworth, John, ed. (2015). "100,000 BC and The Mutants (aka The Daleks)". Doctor Who: The Complete History. 1 (4). London: Panini Comics, Hachette Partworks. ISSN 2057-6048.
- Bould, Mark (2008). "Science Fiction Television in the United Kingdom". In Telotte, J.P. (ed.). The Essential Science Fiction Television Reader. University Press of Kentucky. ISBN 978-0-8131-2492-6.
- Chapman, James (2006). Inside the Tardis: The Worlds of Doctor Who. I.B.Tauris. ISBN 1-84511-162-1.
- Coburn, Anthony (1988). McElroy, John (ed.). Doctor Who - The Scripts: The Tribe of Gum. London: Titan Books. ISBN 1-85286-012-X.
- Cook, John R. (1999). "Adapting telefantasy: the Doctor Who and the Daleks films". In Hunter, IQ (ed.). British Science Fiction Cinema. Psychology Press. ISBN 0-415-16868-6.
- Cornell, Paul; Day, Martin; Topping, Keith (1993). The Guinness Book of Classic British TV. Guinness. ISBN 0-85112-543-3.
- Cornell, Paul; Day, Martin; Topping, Keith (1995). The Discontinuity Guide. London: Virgin Books. ISBN 0-426-20442-5.
- Howe, David J.; Stammers, Mark; Walker, Stephen James (1994). The Handbook. Vol. 1 (2016 ed.). London: Doctor Who Books. ISBN 0-426-20430-1.
- Howe, David J.; Walker, Stephen James (1998). Doctor Who: The Television Companion: Volume 1 (2021 ed.). London: BBC Books. ISBN 978-1-845-83156-1.
- Marson, Richard (2015). Drama and Delight: The Life of Verity Lambert. Tadworth: Miwk Publishing. ISBN 978-1-908-63033-9.
- Muir, John Kenneth (1999). A Critical History of Doctor Who on Television. Jefferson, North Carolina: McFarland & Company. ISBN 978-0-786-40442-1.
- Otta (4 December 1963). "Foreign TV Reviews". Variety. Vol. 233, no. 2. p. 31.
- Peltu, Malcolm (21 January 1982). "Dr Who". New Scientist. 93 (1289). ISSN 0262-4079.
- Wood, Tat; Miles, Lawrence (2006). About Time Volume 1. Mad Norwegian Press. ISBN 978-0-9759446-0-8.
- Wright, Mark, ed. (13 June 2018). "The Massacre of St Bartholomew's Eve, The Ark, The Celestial Toymaker and The Gunfighters". Doctor Who: The Complete History. 7 (73). London: Panini Comics, Hachette Partworks: 8–37. ISSN 2057-6048.
