= The Story of Francis Cludde =

1891 novel by Stanley Weyman

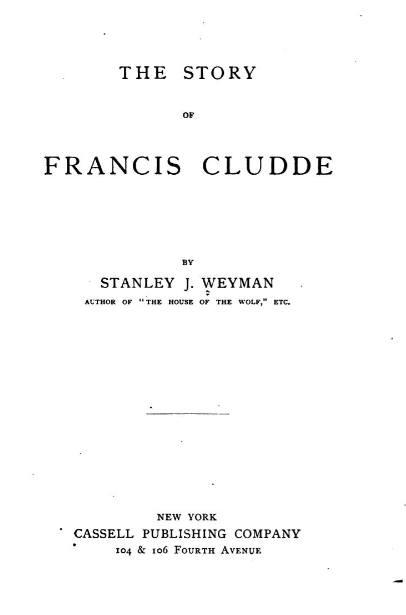
- Title page for The Story of Francis Cludde (1891)
- Author: Stanley Weyman
- Language: English
- Genre: Historical fiction
- Publisher: Cassell Publishing & Longmans Green
- Publication date: 1891, reprinted 1895 and 1911
- Publication place: United Kingdom
- Media type: Print
- Pages: 442

The Story of Francis Cludde is a novel by British author Stanley Weyman first published in 1891. It is set in England and Northern Europe during the reign of Mary I and covers the period February 1555 to November 1558.

== Plot ==
The story opens in Warwickshire where 19 year old Francis Cludde lives with his uncle Sir Anthony and cousin Petronilla. He was left there eight years earlier by his father Ferdinand who then disappeared. His outspoken views get Francis into trouble during a visit from Mary's powerful Chancellor Stephen Gardiner, who advises him to leave England for his own good.

Francis makes his way to London where he meets Catherine, Duchess of Suffolk who is being hunted by Gardiner's men. With Francis' help, she and her husband Bertram escape first to the Spanish Netherlands, then Wesel in Germany still pursued by a man called Clarence, Gardiner's chief agent. They eventually evade their pursuers and end up in what was then the Polish-Lithuania Commonwealth.

The novel passes over the next two years resuming in autumn 1558 when Francis and Bertram return to England to join a conspiracy against Mary. Francis recognises Clarence posing as one of the plotters and denounces him only to discover 'Clarence' is actually his father Ferdinand. At this point, Mary's death brings her Protestant sister Elizabeth I to the throne, allowing Francis to return home. He releases Ferdinand who travels to Warwickshire and incites his brother Sir Anthony to resist the new regime. By doing so, he hopes his brother will be condemned as a traitor and to gain his property as a result. The story ends with Francis foiling this plot and marrying Petronilla, while Ferdinand disappears for good.

This is one of Weyman's earlier works and reflects his typical strengths and weaknesses. As ever, the historical details are well researched, especially the character sketches of real figures like the Duchess of Suffolk and Bishop Gardiner and the portrayal of life in 16th century Holland both vivid and relatively uncommon. The plot moves along at a good speed but many of the characters are one dimensional and even by the standards of the time, the dialogue can seem contrived.

== Reception ==
While it was reprinted in 1891, 1895 and 1911 Weyman's second novel was less successful than his previous effort 'House of the Wolf.' It was positively reviewed by Andrew Lang in the New Review and the US magazine Literary World;
