= Under the Red Robe (1915 film) =

- Directed by: Wilfred Noy
- Written by: Edward E. Rose (play); Stanley J. Weyman
- Production company: Clarendon
- Distributed by: Gaumont British Distributors
- Release date: October 1915
- Country: United Kingdom
- Languages: Silent; English intertitles

Under the Red Robe is a 1915 British silent historical film directed by Wilfred Noy. It is an adventure story set in the era of Cardinal Richelieu, based on the novel of the same name by Stanley J. Weyman. The story was filmed again in 1923 (by Alan Crosland), and in the sound era in 1937 (by Victor Sjöström).

== Cast ==
- Owen Roughwood as Gil de Berault
- Dorothy Drake as Renee de Cochefort
- Jackson Wilcox as Cardinal Richelieu
- Sydney Bland as M. de Cochefort

== Bibliography ==
- Low, Rachael. History of the British Film, 1914-1918. Routledge, 2005.
