= Michael Summerton =

English actor and talent agent (1943–2009)

- Born: 22 December 1943; Rochdale, Lancashire, England
- Died: 16 June 2009 (aged 65); London, England
- Occupations: actor, talent agent

Michael Summerton (22 December 1943 – 16 June 2009) was an English actor and talent agent who began his career as one of the original Dalek operators in Doctor Who, later forming his own talent agency, Michael Summerton Management Ltd. Born in Rochdale, part of Greater Manchester, he studied at the Birmingham Repertory Theatre and had a role as Abanazer in a 1963 performance of Aladdin in the Royal Tunbridge Wells Opera House, which led to a 15-year-long legal battle with presiding agent, Alan Gale, over commission and the displacement of a large quantity of nose putty.

Later, he played small parts in several TV shows, including a role as a postboy in the soap opera Compact and, after a dry spell, a non-speaking role as a Dalek operator. Seeing this as a particularly low point in his career, Summerton joined Hazel Malone's talent agency, where he met David Bowie, who was similarly attempting an acting career, and apparently expressed cynicism in Bowie's musical abilities.

In 1970 Summerton started his own talent agency, recruiting in its heyday Noele Gordon, the dance groups Love Machine and Hot Gossip, Lesley Joseph, Sinitta, Bonnie Langford and the Beverly Sisters. He later managed several dancers and choreographers, including Debbie Astell, Les Child, Thomas Michael Voss, Arlene Phillips and Bruno Tonioli.
