= Stanley J. Weyman =

English historical novelist (1855–1928)

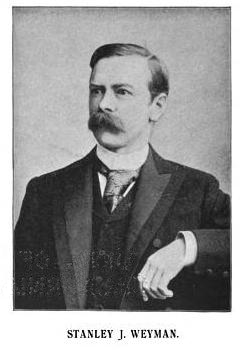
- Born: 7 August 1855; Ludlow, Shropshire, England
- Died: 10 April 1928 (aged 72)
- Education: Christ Church, Oxford
- Occupation: Novelist

Signature
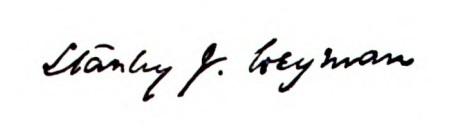

Stanley John Weyman (pronounced [waɪ mæn], 7 August 1855 – 10 April 1928) was an English writer of historical romance. His most popular works were written in 1890–1895 and set in late 16th and early 17th-century France. While very successful at the time, they are now largely forgotten.

== Biography ==
Stanley John Weyman was born on 7 August 1855 in Ludlow, Shropshire, the second son of a solicitor. He attended Shrewsbury School and Christ Church, Oxford, leaving in 1877 with a degree in Modern History. After a year's teaching at the King's School, Chester, he returned to Ludlow in December 1879 to live with his widowed mother.

Weyman was called to the bar in 1881, but had little success as a barrister, as he was shy, nervous and soft-spoken. However, his shortage of briefs gave him time to write. His short story "King Pippin and Sweet Clive" appeared in the Cornhill Magazine, although its editor, James Payn, himself a novelist, told Weyman it would be easier to make a living writing novels. Weyman viewed himself as a historian and so he was particularly encouraged by positive notices for an article he wrote on Oliver Cromwell that was published in the English Historical Review.

Weyman's ill-health prompted him in 1885 to spend several months in the South of France with his younger brother Arthur. In December of that year the brothers were arrested on suspicion of espionage at Aramits. A 24-page critical biography of Weyman published as an annex to an edition of his novel Ovington's Bank (1922) suggests that this ordeal galvanised the thirty-year-old Weyman, who until then had scraped a meagre income writing short stories. His first novel, The House of the Wolf, was published in 1890. Like many of his successful works, it is set in the French religious wars of the late 16th and early 17th centuries.

Weyman became a full-time writer in 1891. Four years later he married Charlotte Panting at Great Fransham, Norfolk, and moved with her to Ruthin in Wales, where they lived for the rest of their lives. Weyman died on 10 April 1928, his wife surviving him by four years; they had no children.

== Reputation ==
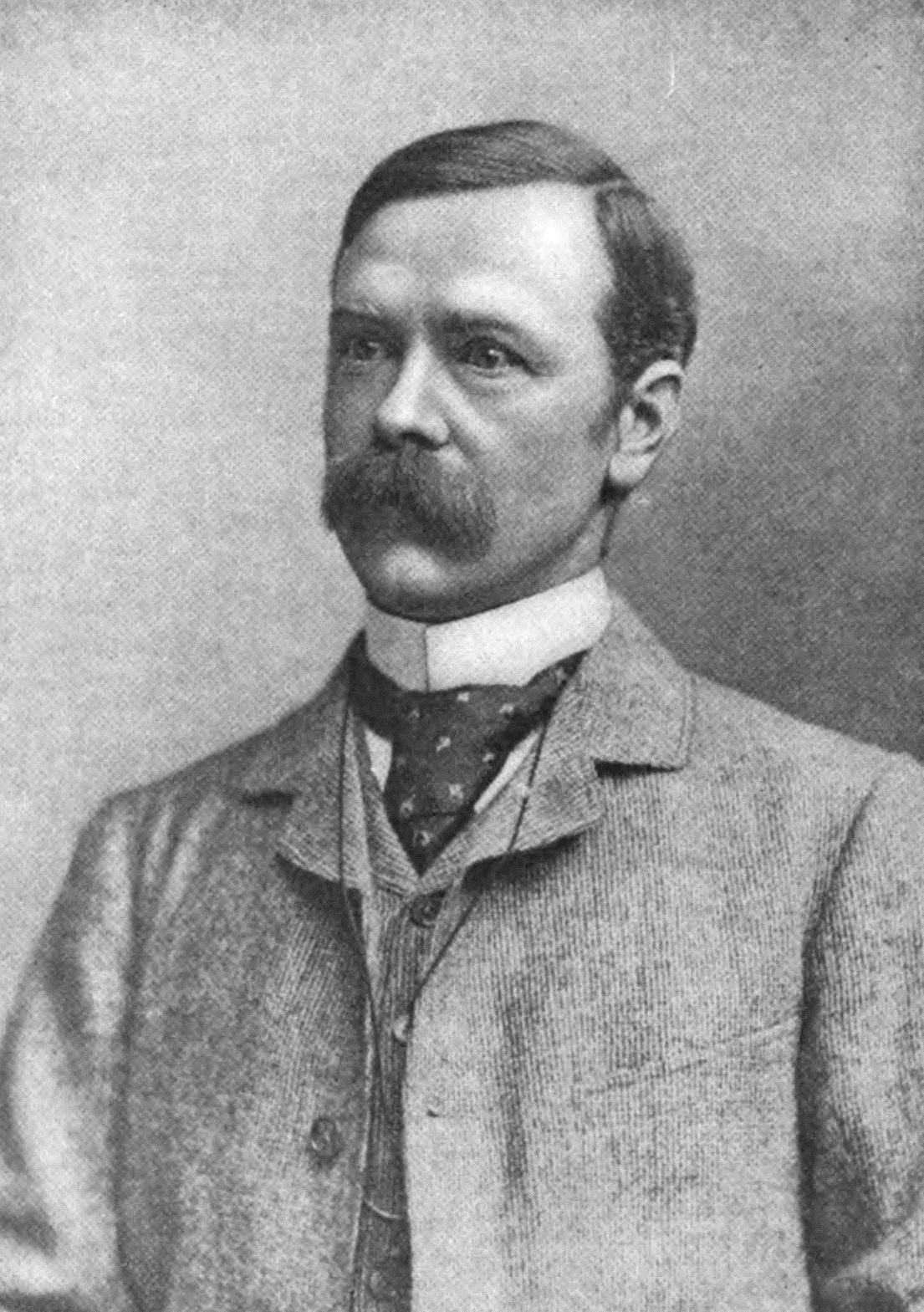
Portrait of Weyman

Weyman in his day was publicly popular and admired by writers such as Robert Louis Stevenson and Oscar Wilde. In a 1970 BBC interview, Graham Greene said, "The key books in my life included Anthony Hope, Rider Haggard, Captain Gilson and I do occasionally re-read them. Stanley Weyman in particular." Works like The Three Musketeers by Alexandre Dumas had established a market for popular historical fiction and it was a crowded field. Contemporary rivals included Baroness Orczy, A. E. W. Mason, John Buchan and Rafael Sabatini.

The biographer Reginald Pound grouped Weyman with Arnold Bennett, Anthony Hope, Aldous Huxley, Dorothy L. Sayers and Somerset Maugham as Strand writers. He is now perhaps the least familiar of all these. His greatest success came before 1895 (Under the Red Robe, A Gentleman of France and The Red Cockade) and he stopped writing entirely between 1908 and 1919. His style and focus are more typical of Victorian writers, as are his faults. With odd exceptions such as Gil de Berault in Under the Red Robe, his characters are fairly uniform, his women caricatures, and his dialogue wooden to modern ears.

Weyman's strength lies in historical detail, often in less familiar areas. The Long Night is based on the Duke of Savoy's attempt to storm Geneva in December 1602, an event still celebrated annually in a festival called L'Escalade. Weyman received an award from the city for his research. The financial security of early success allowed him to choose subjects of personal interest. Some had less general appeal, such as the Reform Act 1832 (treated in Chippinge), post-1815 industrialisation (Starvecrow Farm) or the 1825 financial crisis (Ovington's Bank, reprinted in 2012 and 2015 after the 2008 financial crisis).

Weyman called his books "pleasant fables" and was aware of their modest literary value.

== Bibliography ==
- The House of the Wolf (1890)
- The King's Stratagem (1891)
- The New Rector (1891)
- The Story of Francis Cludde (1891)
- From the Memoirs of a Minister of France (1893)
- A Gentleman of France (1893)
- The Man in Black (1894)
- My Lady Rotha (1894)
- Under the Red Robe (1894, about Cardinal Richelieu and the Day of Dupes)
- A Little Wizard (1895)
- The Red Cockade (1895)
- The Snowball (1895)
- For the Cause (1897)
- Shrewsbury (1897, about Charles Talbot, 1st Duke of Shrewsbury)
- The Castle Inn (1898)
- When Love Calls (1899)
- Sophia (1900)
- Count Hannibal (1901)
- In Kings' Byways (1902, short stories)
- The Long Night (1903)
- The Abbess of Vlaye (1904)
- Starvecrow Farm (1905)
- Chippinge Borough (1906)
- Laid Up in Lavender (1907) (short stories)
- The Wild Geese (1908)
- Madam Constantia (1919) (using the pen-name Jefferson Carter)
- The Great House (1919)
- Ovington's Bank (1922, set in the UK financial Panic of 1825; TV mini-series 1965)
- The Traveller in the Fur Cloak (1924)
- Queen's Folly (1925)
- The Lively Peggy (1928)

== Filmography ==
- Under the Red Robe, directed by Wilfred Noy (UK, 1915)
- A Gentleman of France, directed by Maurice Elvey (UK, 1921)
- Under the Red Robe, directed by Alan Crosland (1923)
- Under the Red Robe, directed by Victor Sjöström (UK, 1937)
- Heiress of Garth, directed by Paddy Russell (UK, 1965, TV miniseries, based on Ovington's Bank)
