= The Red Cockade =

1895 historical novel by Stanley J. Weyman

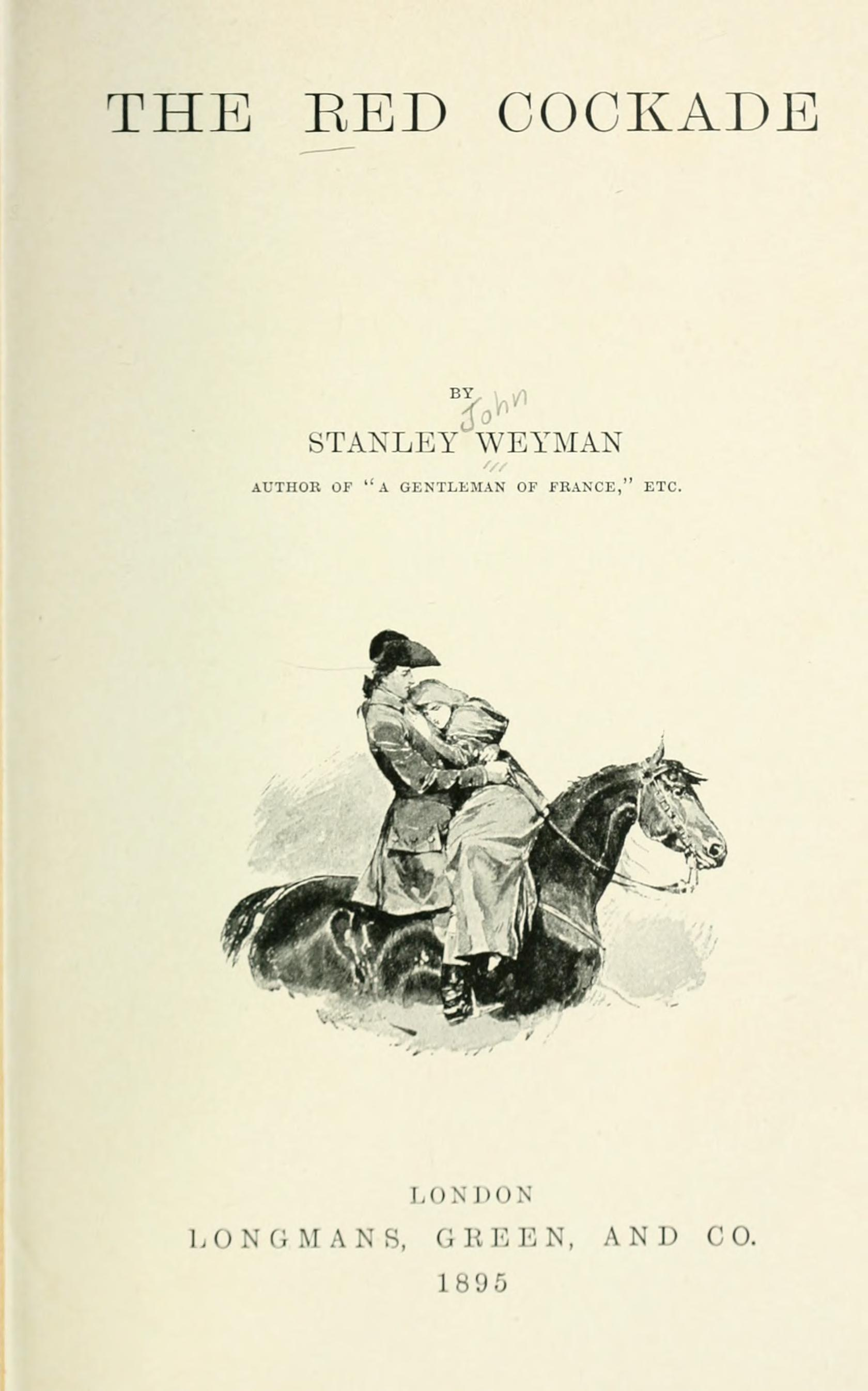
- Title page
- Author: Stanley J. Weyman
- Publication date: 1895

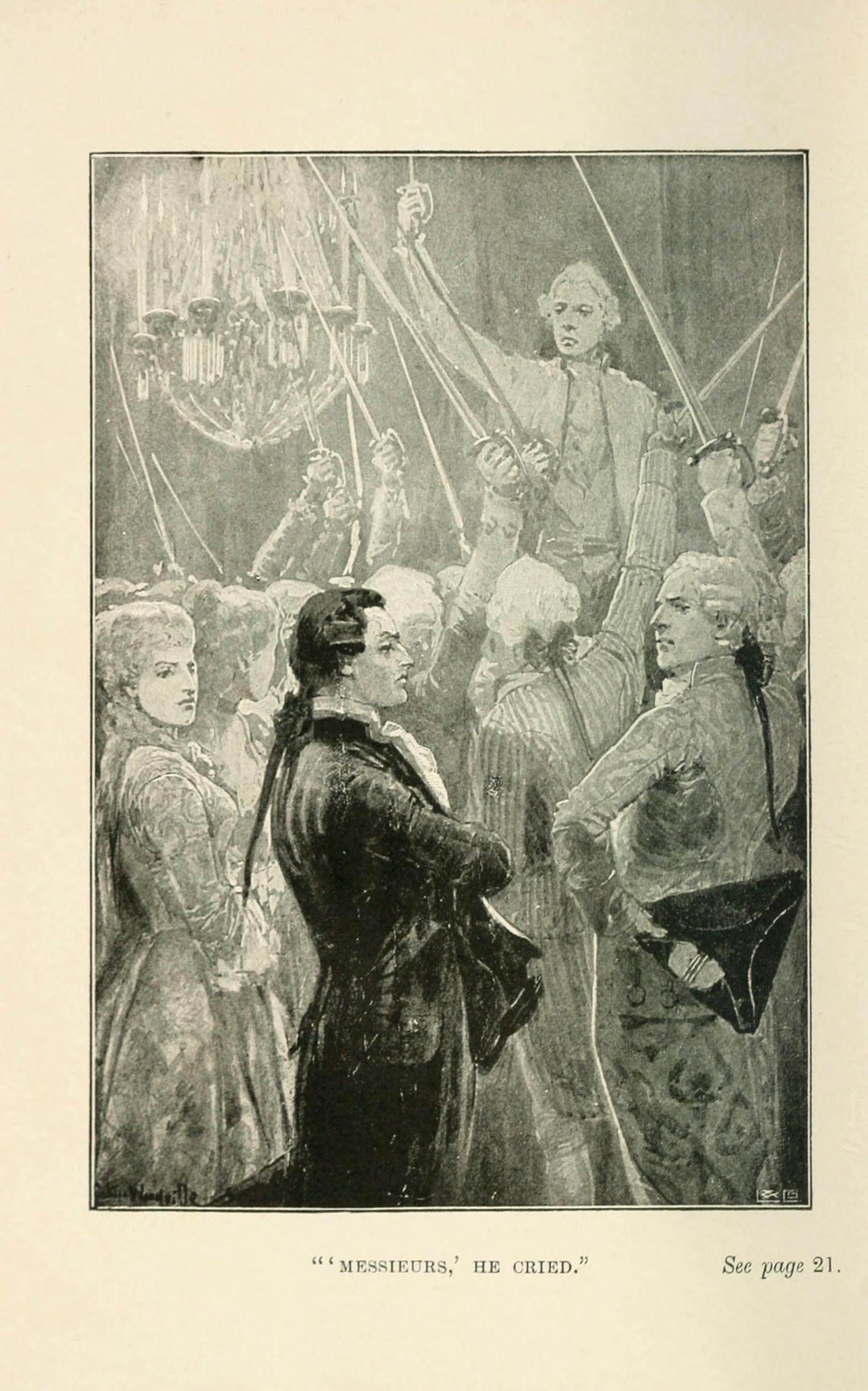
"Messieurs," he cried. See page 21.

The Red Cockade is an historical novel by Stanley J. Weyman, published in 1895.

== Synopsis ==
The hero, the Vicomte de Saux, is one of the French nobility. His sympathy with the troubles of the French peasants leads him to adopt the Red Cockade, notwithstanding his ties of blood and his engagement to marry a young woman of a prominent Royalist family. He is constantly torn between loyalty to his convictions and to the woman that he loves, and is often placed in situations where he is obliged to save Mademoiselle de St. Alais from the rage of the mob.

As the Vicomte de Saux refuses to join the Aristocrats, the mother and one brother of Mademoiselle de St. Alais denounce him utterly. But Dénise herself, after having been saved by him from her burning chateau, loves him intensely and is true to him, though her relatives have betrothed her to the leader of the Royalists. The other brother Louis, from his old friendship for the Vicomte, upholds his sister. The book closes with a scene in the room where Madame de St. Alais lies dying from wounds received at the hands of the mob. Her elder son has been killed by the revolutionists. With the mother are Dénise and Louis, and also the Vicomte de Saux. In her last moments she gives Dénise to her lover. After their marriage the Vicomte and his bride retire to their country place at Saux. The man to whom Dénise was betrothed out of vengeance to her lover, disappears after the overthrow of his party.

== Appraisal ==
In 1896, the book was reviewed in The Journal of Education. According to Helen Rex Keller, "This is a romance filled with exciting incidents of the stormy times of the French Revolution."

== See also ==
- Cockade
- Cockade of France

== Sources ==
- Weyman, Stephen J. (1895). The Red Cockade. London: Longmans, Green, and Co.

Attribution:

- Keller, Helen Rex (1917). "Red Cockade, The". The Reader's Digest of Books. The Library of the World's Best Literature. New York: The Macmillan Company. p. 729.
