= Under the Red Robe (1923 film) =

1923 film by Alan Crosland

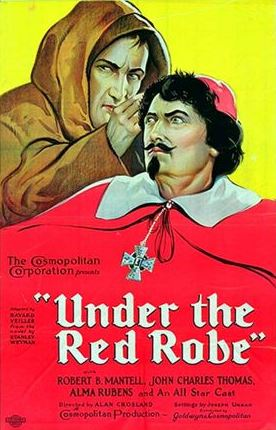
- 1923 lobby poster showing Robert B. Mantell and John Charles Thomas
- Directed by: Alan Crosland
- Written by: Bayard Veiller (scenario)
- Based on: Under the Red Robe (1894 novel) by Stanley J. Weyman
- Starring: Robert B. Mantell
- Cinematography: Gilbert Warrenton; Harold Wenstrom
- Music by: William Frederick Peters
- Production company: Cosmopolitan Productions
- Distributed by: Goldwyn Pictures
- Release date: November 12, 1923 (US)
- Running time: 10 reels (2,762 meters)
- Country: United States
- Language: Silent (English intertitles)

Under the Red Robe is a 1923 American silent historical drama film directed by Alan Crosland based upon the Stanley Weyman novel Under the Red Robe. The film marks the last motion picture appearance by stage actor Robert B. Mantell who plays Cardinal Richelieu and the only silent screen performance of opera singer John Charles Thomas.

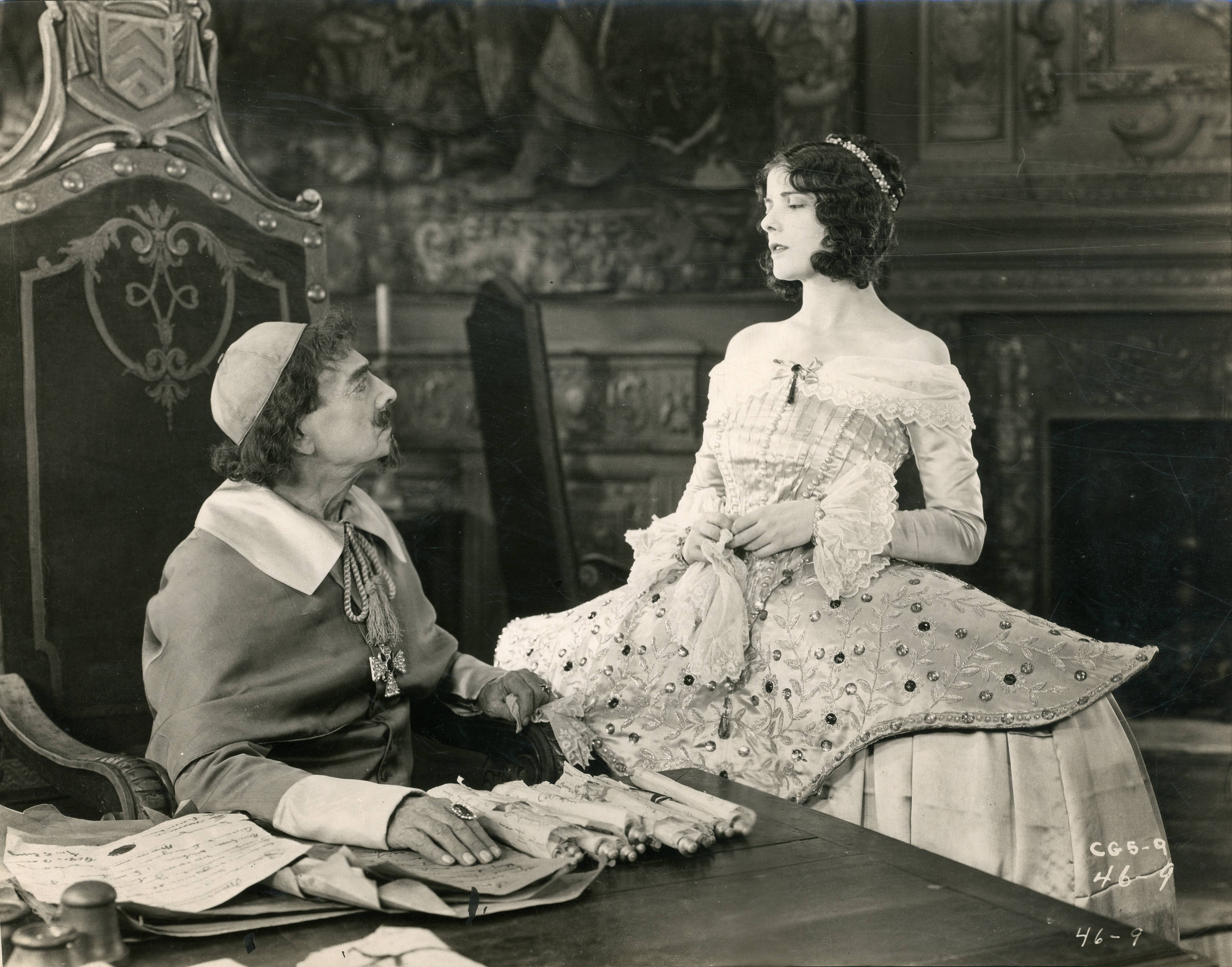
Under the Red Robe film still

The novel was also filmed in 1915 (by Wilfred Noy), and again in the sound era in 1937 (by Victor Sjöström).

== Cast ==
- Robert B. Mantell as Cardinal Richelieu
- Alma Rubens as Renee de Cocheforet
- Otto Kruger as Henri de Cocheforet
- John Charles Thomas as Gil De Berault
- William Powell as Duke of Orleans
- Ian Maclaren as King Louis XIII
- Genevieve Hamper as Duchess de Chevreuse
- Mary MacLaren as Anne of Austria
- Rose Coghlan as Marie de' Medici
- Gustav von Seyffertitz as Clom
- Sidney Herbert as Father Joseph
- Arthur Housman as Captain La Rolle
- Paul Panzer as French Army Lieutenant
- Charles Judels as Antoine
- George Nash as Jules
- Evelyn Gosnell as Madame de Cocheforet

== Preservation ==
The film survives complete at the George Eastman House. A Samuel Goldwyn release, it was donated by MGM.
