= Lip-ribbon microphone =

Microphone for live news reporters

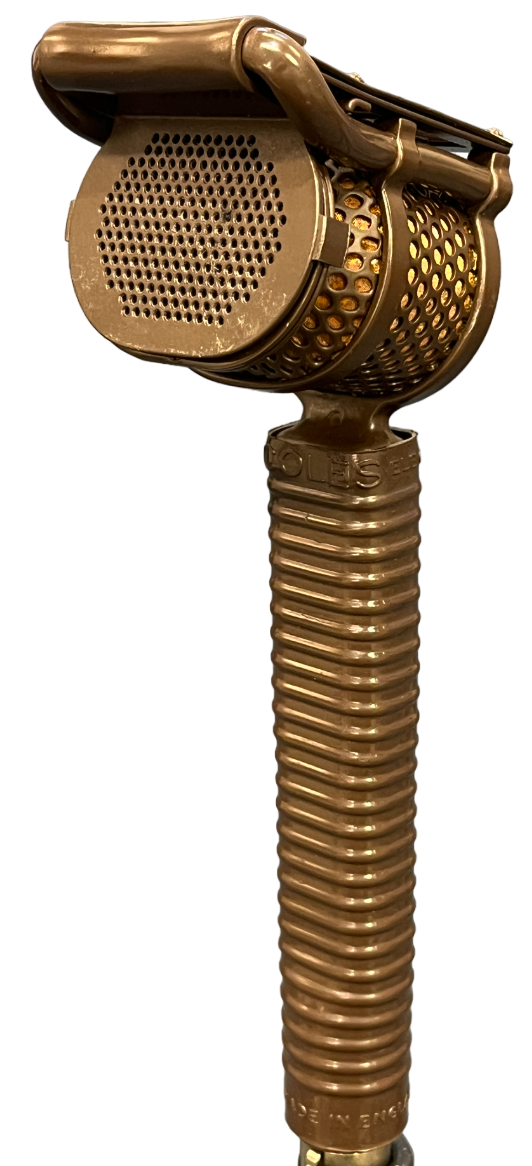
Lip-ribbon microphone Coles 4104 in brown

The lip-ribbon microphone (also known as the "commentator's lip" microphone) is a type of ribbon microphone designed specially for use by live news reporters or sports commentators. Organisations such as the BBC, CBS and ABC use lip-ribbon microphones to cover events including motor racing, wrestling, processions and demonstrations.

== Design ==
=== Noise reduction ===
Lip-ribbon microphones use baffles to create an acoustic labyrinth within the body of the microphone. The microphone's bi-directional polar pattern controls interference; sound from the commentator reaches one side of the ribbon more than the other, whereas sounds from other sources contact both sides of the ribbon (at a difference in phase of 180°) and cancel out. The labyrinth design also allows lip-ribbon microphones to withstand wind speeds of up to 20 miles per hour (32 km/h) without affecting speech. This resistance can be further strengthened with the use of wind shields.

=== Frequency response ===
The microphone is subject to increased bass when used at close proximity in pressure gradient mode. Distant sources are not affected by this. However, increasing the distance between the source and microphone levels the frequency response, and will decrease the noise of ambient sound by the same level. As a result of this, many lip-ribbon microphones use a fixed mouth guard to ensure a distance of 54 millimetres (2.1 in) between source and microphone. Any plosive effects are then controlled by means of pop shields and meshes.

Lip-ribbon microphones are more efficient at noise reduction at lower frequencies. In general, noise reduction at 300 Hz is 10 dB; at 100 Hz it is 20 dB. Lip-ribbon microphones' response will often not be much higher than 10 kHz, which is sufficient in the speaking voice applications for which it is normally used.

The internal layout of the microphone is such that the ribbon is directed away from the user with the yoke of the magnet towards them.

== Sources ==
- Gorfinkle, Joseph (2011), Commentator's Ribbon Microphone, West Hollywood, CA: Sliding Delta, archived from the original on 1 December 2010
- Coles (2011), Microphones for Commentators: Model 4104, Hoddesdon, Hertfordshire: Coles Electroacoustics Ltd
- Miller, Ant (2010), BBC R&D Heritage Microphones, London: BBC
- Nisbett, Alec (1995), The Sound Studio (6th ed.), Oxford: Focal Press, ISBN 0-240-51395-9
