= Under the Red Robe (1937 film) =

1937 film by Victor Sjöström

- Directed by: Victor Sjöström
- Written by: Arthur Wimperis
- Screenplay by: Lajos Bíró; Philip Lindsay; J.L. Hodson
- Based on: Under the Red Robe by Stanley J. Weyman
- Produced by: Robert Kane
- Starring: Conrad Veidt; Annabella; Raymond Massey
- Cinematography: James Wong Howe; Georges Périnal
- Edited by: James B. Clark
- Music by: Arthur Benjamin
- Production company: New World Pictures
- Distributed by: 20th Century Fox
- Release dates: 31 May 1937 (United States); 8 November 1937 (United Kingdom)
- Countries: United Kingdom; United States
- Language: English

Under the Red Robe is a 1937 British-American historical adventure film directed by Victor Sjöström and starring Conrad Veidt, Annabella and Raymond Massey. It was written by Arthur Wimperis, Lajos Bíró, Philip Lindsay and J.L. Hodson, based on the 1894 novel of the same title by Stanley J. Weyman.

The film is set during the religious wars of early 17th century France; events in the novel itself means it can be dated to the autumn of 1630.

The story was previously filmed in 1915 (by Wilfred Noy) and 1923 (by Alan Crosland). Before both films a play had been produced on Broadway in 1896–1897 starring Viola Allen and William Faversham.

== Plot ==
Notorious gambler and dreaded swordsman Gil de Berault returns to Paris after carrying out a mission for the 'Red Robe' or Cardinal Richelieu and finds him concerned by growing opposition from French Protestants or Huguenots in the south. He also warns de Berault dueling has been outlawed and henceforth punishable by death but Gil promptly disobeys the law and is sentenced to be executed as a result. The Cardinal offers de Berault a pardon if he is able to capture the Protestant Duc de Foix who is organizing plans for an uprising. Gil agrees, travels to the duke's home and is allowed to stay as a guest, but the duke's wife and his sister Lady Marguerite immediately suspect he is a spy. Nevertheless, he makes good progress but then falls in love with Marguerite, forcing him to choose between conscience and self-interest.

== Cast ==
- Conrad Veidt as Gil de Berault
- Annabella as Lady Marguerite of Foix
- Raymond Massey as Cardinal Richelieu
- Romney Brent as Marius
- Sophie Stewart as Elise, Duchess of Foix
- Wyndham Goldie as Edmond, Duke of Foix
- Lawrence Grant as Father Joseph
- Baliol Holloway as Clon
- Shale Gardner as Louis
- Frank Damer as Pierre
- James Regan as Jean
- Edie Martin as Maria
- Haddon Mason as Count Rossignac
- J. Fisher White as Baron Breteuil
- Graham Soutten as Leval
- Anthony Eustrel as Lieutenant Brissac
- Desmond Roberts as Capt. Rivarolle
- Ralph Truman as Captain at castle
- Eric Hales as Lieutenant at castle

== Reception ==
The Monthly Film Bulletin wrote: "Technically, the film is rarely more than moderate. The editing is lame, and turns some of the climaxes to bathos; and certain of the sets smack noticeably of the studio. The dialogue is very elementary, explaining each point separately with laborious emphasis. The middle parts of the film retain a certain naive vigour, but the end is childish, and the last quarter of an hour drags on interminably. Since the characters are nearly all lay figures, there is little to be said about the acting – except for Romney Brent, who gives an admirable comedy-performance as Gil's unscrupulous servant. Annabella suffers from too many close-ups, and Raymond Massey from a farcical make-up as Richelieu. Conrad Veidt, as Gil, at any rate looks impressive. Although not convincing from an adult point of view, the film would probably be found quite exciting and entertaining by children."

Kine Weekly wrote: "The story treatment is a trifle reticent as regards rousing outdoor spectacle, but the dominating love interest and atmosphere of intrigue are magnificently substantiated by the attractive and competent cast, and it is the prominence given to these irresistable elements that convert a popular novel into an even more popular screen entertainment. Conrad is a tower of strength in the lead, he creates aby suggestion, if not physical interpretation, an aura of swashbuckling adventure, and Annabella is delightful as the heroine."

Variety wrote: "Annabella photographs superbly, acts like a trouper of the first water, and only in her lightly intoned speeches is there any difficulty about understanding her English. Both in her love sequences and her dramatic moments, the comely French actress comes through with few flaws. Direction never wastes a move, going directly to the point, holding proper suspense and mixing droll comedy with the exciting and dramatic moments."
