= Under the Red Robe (novel) =

1894 novel by English author Stanley J. Weyman

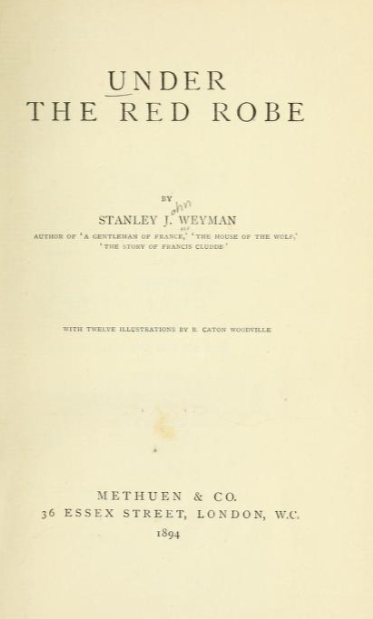
- Title page for Under the Red Robe (1894)
- Author: Stanley J. Weyman
- Language: English
- Genre: Drama
- Publication date: 1894
- Publication place: United Kingdom
- Media type: Print

Under the Red Robe is a historical novel by Stanley J. Weyman, first published in 1894. Often described as his best work, it was also the most commercially successful, going through 34 reprints, the last in 1962.

As with other Weyman novels, it takes place during the French religious wars of the early 17th century. Since it contains a real historical event, the Day of the Dupes, the timing is the autumn of 1630 when Cardinal Richelieu (the 'Red Robe') was Chief Minister for Louis XIII. Under his guidance, the French state was supporting Protestants in Germany as part of the Thirty Years' War while suppressing domestic Protestants or Huguenots in southwest France.

The plot features one of Weyman's more interesting characters, Gil de Berault, a gambler and notorious dueller living in Paris who sometimes acts as hired muscle for the Cardinal. He fights one duel too many and is given the choice between execution or helping the Cardinal capture a key Huguenot rebel. He picks the second option and ultimately achieves his objectives but in the process meets a good woman.

The novel was well received by contemporary historical novelists. Conan Doyle wrote that Under the Red Robe had "the most dramatic opening of any historical novel I know" and Siegfried Sassoon described his excitement as a schoolboy on first reading a copy.

It was adapted for the stage at the Haymarket Theatre in 1896, also playing on Broadway and first filmed in 1915 as a silent movie and again in 1923. A third version was made in 1937, the British swashbuckler Under the Red Robe directed by Victor Sjöström and featuring Conrad Veidt as Gil de Berault, Raymond Massey as the Cardinal and French actress Annabella as the romantic interest.
