= List of Doctor Who home video releases =

This is a list of Doctor Who serials and episodes that have been released on DVD and Blu-ray.

== DVD ==
=== Release ===
Most Doctor Who DVDs have been released first in the United Kingdom with Region 2, and released later in Australia and New Zealand (Region 4) and in North America (Region 1). Aside from differences in the external packaging, special features and commentaries are mostly identical in all versions. All Region 1 releases prior to September 2005 included a "Who's Who" feature that identified key cast members and gave brief biographies and filmographies. The Region 1 releases of The Robots of Death, The Ark in Space, The Talons of Weng-Chiang, and Pyramids of Mars also include a featurette with the syndicated Time Life introductions and closings narrated by Howard da Silva.

There are also minor variations having to do with technical glitches that occurred in the Region 2 discs but were corrected in time for the Region 1 release (The Caves of Androzani, Remembrance of the Daleks, Complete Series Two box set). The Region 2 discs released up to 2009 have also been dual coded with Region 4, so the two have been identical; this practice ceased for new releases in 2010. The only exceptions are Vengeance on Varos, which fixed an error on the Region 2 version in episode 2, and Remembrance of the Daleks, which used the NTSC master due to errors on the UK version and issues about music clearance.

=== Features ===
With few exceptions (noted below), each of the 'classic series' stories have been carefully restored by the Doctor Who Restoration Team from the best available materials, and are presented as originally broadcast—in episodic format, where applicable. Other features present on every (or nearly every) DVD include cast and crew commentary, subtitles, production notes, and a photo gallery.

"Special edition" releases (which make up the bulk of the line; see above) also typically include one or more documentaries relating to the serial in question, any relevant archive material, and—where applicable—the occasional highlight such as a Dolby 5.1 mix or enhanced movie edit. The precise features vary, depending on the available resources and the nature of the story.

Most, but not all, Doctor Who mini-episodes, prequels and webcasts are bundled as part of the DVD and Blu-ray releases. For example, five prelude videos were released online as part of series 6, and these are extras on the series 6 box set. Some Doctor Who webcasts were released on their own special DVDs.

== Blu-ray ==
=== Release ===
"Planet of the Dead" was the first Doctor Who episode to be filmed and broadcast in high definition. It was released on Blu-ray on the same day as its corresponding DVD in Region 2. All subsequent episodes (excluding the animated Dreamland) have also been filmed and broadcast in high-definition and released on Blu-ray, usually simultaneously with the corresponding DVDs. An upscaled version of "The Next Doctor" (which was shot in standard definition) was also released on Blu-ray as part of a box set containing all of the 2008–2010 specials. It was also released individually in Australia and New Zealand. In 2011, the 1975 Doctor Who serial Pyramids of Mars was included on both the DVD and Blu-ray box sets for The Sarah Jane Adventures Season 4.

Spearhead from Space, the only serial of the classic series shot completely on film, was released on Blu-ray on 15 July 2013 with exclusive bonus features. The 1996 telemovie received a Blu-ray release on 19 September 2016. Despite being shot entirely on film, the Blu-ray release is simply an HD upscale of the 480i broadcast copy. A limited edition Blu-ray box-set containing Series 1-7 of Doctor Who was released 5 November 2013. Series 1-4 was shot on standard definition video but upscaled and remastered to full 1080p for this release.

==== The Collection ====
The classic era began to receive complete season Blu-ray releases from 2018 onward, under the banner "The Collection". In 2021, the BBC rebranded the range as "The Collection Limited Edition Packaging", with the original "The Collection" name to be used for standard edition versions of the releases.

Complete Season	Doctor	Release date		
Complete Season	Doctor	Region B / UK	Region B / AU	Region A / US
Season 2	First Doctor	5 December 2022	25 January 2023	28 March 2023
Season 7	Third Doctor	3 March 2025	4 June 2025	3 June 2025
Season 8	Third Doctor	8 March 2021	26 May 2021	1 June 2021
Season 9	Third Doctor	20 March 2023	23 August 2023	11 July 2023
Season 10	Third Doctor	8 July 2019	13 November 2019	15 October 2019
Season 12	Fourth Doctor	2 July 2018	1 August 2018	19 June 2018
Season 13	Fourth Doctor	20 October 2025	3 December 2025	20 January 2026
Season 14	Fourth Doctor	4 May 2020	15 July 2020	4 August 2020
Season 15	Fourth Doctor	18 March 2024	19 June 2024	9 July 2024
Season 17	Fourth Doctor	20 December 2021	16 February 2022	5 April 2022
Season 18	Fourth Doctor	18 March 2019	17 April 2019	19 March 2019
Season 19	Fifth Doctor	10 December 2018	23 January 2019	4 December 2018
Season 20	Fifth Doctor	18 September 2023	24 July 2024	4 June 2024
Season 21	Fifth Doctor	16 March 2026	6 May 2026	7 July 2026
Season 22	Sixth Doctor	20 June 2022	14 September 2022	18 October 2022
Season 23	Sixth Doctor	7 October 2019	4 December 2019	3 December 2019
Season 24	Seventh Doctor	21 June 2021	25 August 2021	21 September 2021
Season 25	Seventh Doctor	21 October 2024	18 December 2024	25 February 2025
Season 26	Seventh Doctor	27 January 2020	11 March 2020	24 March 2020

=== Specifications ===
Episodes released on Blu-ray starting with "Planet of the Dead" were shot in full 1080p high definition and have been released with DTS-HD High Resolution 5.1 soundtracks. All Ninth and Tenth Doctor episodes appearing on Blu-ray produced prior to "Planet of the Dead" have been upscaled to 1080p for those releases. The first classic series serial released on Blu-ray in HD, Spearhead from Space, was shot entirely on 16mm film and true 1080p masters for those episodes were produced from the original film elements; the Blu-ray release was in 1080i. Other classic series releases have been upscaled, with HD film scans inserted where possible, and some releases use specially made animated elements. "Twice Upon a Time" (2017), Peter Capaldi's final episode, was released on 4K Ultra HD Blu-ray in 2018.

== Releases ==
All releases are for DVD unless otherwise indicated:

- ^{(D)} indicates a DVD release for a specific date
- ^{(B)} indicates a Blu-ray release
- ^{(D,B)} indicates a simultaneous DVD and Blu-ray release
- ^{(3D)} indicates a 3D Blu-ray release (includes DVD and Blu-ray)
- ^{(D,3D)} indicates a simultaneous DVD and 3D Blu-ray (includes Blu-ray) release
- ^{(UHD)} indicates an Ultra HD Blu-ray release (includes Blu-ray)
- ^{(B,UHD)} indicates a simultaneous Blu-ray and Ultra HD Blu-ray (includes Blu-ray) release

=== First Doctor ===
Starring William Hartnell as the First Doctor. Surviving First Doctor serials and episodes were released on DVD from 2002 to 2013. The surviving serials and episodes of Season 2 were released on Blu-ray in 2022. Two episodes recovered in 2026 are yet to be released on home media.

All existing episodes from otherwise missing First Doctor serials have been released on the Lost in Time collection, with the exception of: Galaxy 4 episode 3, which was released as part of The Aztecs – Special Edition; The Reign of Terror which had its missing episodes animated for its individual DVD release; and The Tenth Planet which had its missing episode animated for its release as part of the Regeneration Box and individual DVD release. Lost in Time was released in two formats in Region 1, with individual releases for volumes one and two (which cover First Doctor and Second Doctor episodes respectively), as well as an edition combining both volumes. In Regions 2 and 4, Lost in Time is available only as the combined single volume.

Season	Story no.	Serial name	Duration	Release date		
Season	Story no.	Serial name	Duration	R2 / UK	R4 / AU	R1 / US
1	1–4	An Unearthly Child; The Daleks; The Edge of Destruction; Marco Polo (condensed reconstruction)	13 × 25 min. 1 × 30 min.	30 January 2006	2 March 2006	28 March 2006
1	2	The Daleks in Colour	1 × 75 min. 7 × 25 min.	12 February 2024 ^{(D,B)}	4 September 2024 ^{(D,B)}	19 March 2024 ^{(D,B)}
1	5	The Keys of Marinus	6 × 25 min.	21 September 2009	7 January 2010	5 January 2010
1	6	The Aztecs	4 × 25 min.	7 October 2002	2 December 2002	4 March 2003
1	6, 18	The Aztecs (Special Edition); Galaxy 4 (Note: Episode 3 of 4, condensed reconstruction of episodes 1, 2, and 4)	5 × 25 min.	11 March 2013	20 March 2013	12 March 2013
1	7	The Sensorites	6 × 25 min.	23 January 2012	2 February 2012	14 February 2012
1	8	The Reign of Terror (Note: Episodes 1–3 and 6 of 6, animation of 4 and 5)	6 × 25 min.	28 January 2013	6 February 2013	12 February 2013
2	9	Planet of Giants	3 × 25 min.	20 August 2012	5 September 2012	11 September 2012
2	10	The Dalek Invasion of Earth	6 × 25 min.	16 June 2003	13 August 2003	7 October 2003
2	11–12	The Rescue; The Romans	6 × 25 min.	23 February 2009	2 April 2009	7 July 2009
2	13	The Web Planet	6 × 25 min.	3 October 2005	3 November 2005	5 September 2006
2	15–16	The Space Museum; The Chase	10 × 25 min.	1 March 2010	6 May 2010	6 July 2010
2	17	The Time Meddler	4 × 25 min.	4 February 2008	2 April 2008	5 August 2008
2	9–17	Complete Season 2 (Note: Released as Doctor Who: The Collection – Season 2 in Region B. Released as Doctor Who – William Hartnell: Complete Season Two in Region A.)	39 × 25 min.	5 December 2022 ^{(B)}	25 January 2023 ^{(B)}	28 March 2023 ^{(B)}
3	18	Galaxy 4 (Note: All four episodes animated (colour and black and white versions), remastered Episode 3 and "tele-snap" reconstructions)	4 × 25 min.	15 November 2021 ^{(D,B)}	12 January 2022 ^{(D,B)}	5 April 2022
3	23	The Ark	4 × 25 min.	14 February 2011	3 March 2011	8 March 2011
3	24	The Celestial Toymaker (Note: All four episodes animated (colour and black-and-white versions), remastered Episode 4 and 'tele-snap' reconstructions)	4 × 25 min.	10 June 2024 ^{(D,B)}	4 September 2024 ^{(D,B)}	11 June 2024 ^{(B)}
3	25	The Gunfighters (Note: Only available as part of the Earth Story box set in Regions 2 and 4. Only available individually in Region 1.)	4 × 25 min.	20 June 2011	4 August 2011	12 July 2011
3	26	The Savages (Note: All four episodes animated (colour and black and white versions))	4 × 25 min.	24 March 2025 ^{(D,B)}	4 June 2025 ^{(D,B)}	20 May 2025 ^{(B)}
3	27	The War Machines	4 × 25 min.	25 August 2008	7 November 2008	6 January 2009
2, 3	14, 21, 24	Lost in Time, Volume 1 The Crusade (Note: Episodes 1 and 3 of 4, with soundtracks of episodes 2 and 4); The Daleks' Master Plan (Note: Episodes 2, 5, and 10 of 12); The Celestial Toymaker (Note: Episode 4 of 4)	6 × 25 min. (Note: Also includes surviving clips from The Smugglers and The Tenth Planet)	1 November 2004	December 2004 (Note: Re-released on 1 July 2010)	2 November 2004
4	29	The Tenth Planet (Note: Episodes 1–3 of 4, with both animated and "telesnap" reconstructions of episode 4)	4 × 25 min.	24 June 2013 (Note: Released as part of the Regeneration boxset); 14 October 2013 (Note: The Region 2 release of The Tenth Planet was released in advance as part of the Regeneration box set without special features, and was later re-released on its own with special features.)	30 October 2013	19 November 2013

=== Second Doctor ===
Starring Patrick Troughton as the Second Doctor. All surviving Second Doctor serials and episodes were released on DVD from 2002 to 2015.

All existing episodes from otherwise missing Second Doctor serials have been released on the Lost in Time collection, with the exceptions of: The Underwater Menace episode 2 and The Web of Fear episodes 2, 4, 5 and 6, which were recovered after the release of Lost in Time; The Ice Warriors and The Invasion which had their missing episodes animated for its DVD release. The collection also included episode 3 of The Enemy of the World, which (at the time of the collection's release) was the only extant episode from that serial. Lost in Time was released in two formats in Region 1, with individual releases for Volumes 1 and 2 (which cover First Doctor and Second Doctor episodes, respectively), as well as an edition combining both volumes. In Regions 2 and 4, Lost in Time is available only as the combined single volume.

Season	Story no.	Serial name	Duration	Release date		
Season	Story no.	Serial name	Duration	R2	R4	R1
4	30	The Power of the Daleks (Note: All six episodes animated)	6 × 25 min.	21 November 2016	14 December 2016; 22 February 2017 (Note: Colour edition)	24 January 2017
4	30	The Power of the Daleks (Special Edition) (Note: All six episodes animated)	6 × 25 min.	27 July 2020^{(D,B)}	26 August 2020	—N/a
4	32	The Underwater Menace (Note: Episodes 2 and 3 of 4, with "tele-snap" reconstructions of episodes 1 and 4)	4 × 25 min.	26 October 2015	2 December 2015	24 May 2016
4	32	The Underwater Menace (Special Edition) (Note: All four episodes animated (colour and black and white versions), remastered Episode 2 & 3 and "tele-snap" reconstructions of Episodes 1 and 4)	4 × 25 min.	13 November 2023^{(D,B)}	16 April 2025^{(D,B)}	9 January 2024^{(B)}
4	33	The Moonbase (Note: Episodes 2 and 4 of 4, animation of 1 and 3)	4 × 25 min.	20 January 2014	22 January 2014	11 February 2014
4	34	The Macra Terror (Note: All four episodes animated (colour and black and white versions) and "tele-snap" reconstruction)	4 × 25 min.	25 March 2019^{(D,B)}	17 April 2019^{(D,B)}	12 November 2019
4	35	The Faceless Ones (Note: Animation of all six episodes (in Colour and Black and White), surviving episodes 1 & 3 and "tele-snap" reconstructions of 2 & 4-6)	6 × 25 min.	16 March 2020^{(D,B)}	8 April 2020	20 October 2020
4	36	The Evil of the Daleks (Note: Animation of all six episodes (in Colour and Black and White), surviving episode 2 remastered and "tele-snap" reconstructions of 1, & 3-7)	7 × 25 min.	27 September 2021^{(D,B)}	10 November 2021	16 November 2021
5	37	The Tomb of the Cybermen	4 × 25 min.	14 January 2002	28 March 2002	6 August 2002
5	37	The Tomb of the Cybermen (Special Edition) (Note: Only available as part of the Revisitations 3 box set in Regions 2 and 4. Only available individually in Region 1.)	4 × 25 min.	13 February 2012	1 March 2012	13 March 2012
5	38	The Abominable Snowmen (Note: All six episodes animated (colour and black and white versions), remastered Episode 2 and "tele-snap" reconstructions)	6 × 25 min.	5 September 2022^{(D,B)}	2 November 2022 ^{(D,B)}	6 December 2022 ^{(D,B)}
5	39	The Ice Warriors (Note: Episodes 1 and 4–6 of 6, with both animated full and "tele-snap" partial reconstructions of episodes 2 and 3)	6 × 25 min.	26 August 2013	28 August 2013	17 September 2013
5	40	The Enemy of the World	6 × 25 min.	25 November 2013	27 November 2013	10 December 2013 (Note: 20 May 2014 in the United States)
5	40	The Enemy of the World (Special Edition)	6 × 25 min.	26 March 2018	8 August 2018	—N/a
5	41	The Web of Fear (Note: Episodes 1–2 and 4–6 of 6, with a "tele-snap" reconstruction of episode 3)	6 × 25 min.	24 February 2014	26 February 2014	22 April 2014
5	41	The Web of Fear (Special Edition) (Note: Episodes 1–2 and 4–6 of 6, with an animated reconstruction of episode 3)	6 × 25 min.	16 August 2021 ^{(D,B)}	22 September 2021 ^{(D,B)}	1 February 2022
5	42	Fury From the Deep (Note: All six episodes animated)	6 × 25 min.	14 September 2020 ^{(D,B)}	11 November 2020 ^{(D,B)}	20 April 2021
6	44	The Dominators	5 × 25 min.	12 July 2010	2 September 2010	11 January 2011
6	45	The Mind Robber	5 × 20 min.	7 March 2005	5 May 2005	6 September 2005
6	46	The Invasion (Note: Episodes 2–3 and 5–8 of 8, animation of 1 and 4)	8 × 25 min.	6 November 2006	3 January 2007	6 March 2007
6	47	The Krotons	4 × 25 min.	2 July 2012	2 August 2012	10 July 2012
6	48	The Seeds of Death	6 × 25 min.	17 February 2003	5 May 2003	2 March 2004
6	48	The Seeds of Death (Special Edition) (Note: Only available as part of the Revisitations 2 box set in Regions 2 and 4. Only available individually in Region 1.)	6 × 25 min.	28 March 2011	5 May 2011	12 June 2012
6	50	The War Games (Note: Available individually or in the Regeneration box set in Region 2. Only available individually in Regions 1 and 4.)	10 × 25 min.	6 July 2009	3 September 2009	3 November 2009
6	50	The War Games in Colour	1 × 75 min. 10 × 25 min.	21 April 2025 ^{(D,B)}	16 July 2025^{(D,B)}	24 June 2025 ^{(B)}
4, 5, 6	32, 33, 35, 36, 38, 40, 41, 43, 49	Lost in Time, Volume 2 The Underwater Menace (Note: Episode 3 of 4); The Moonbase (Note: Episodes 2 and 4 of 4; soundtracks of 1 and 3); The Faceless Ones (Note: Episodes 1 and 3 of 6); The Evil of the Daleks (Note: Episode 2 of 7); The Abominable Snowmen (Note: Episode 2 of 6); The Enemy of the World (Note: Episode 3 of 6); The Web of Fear (Note: Episode 1 of 6); The Wheel in Space (Note: Episodes 3 and 6 of 6); The Space Pirates (Note: Episode 2 of 6)	12 × 25 min. (Note: Also includes surviving clips from The Power of the Daleks, The Highlanders, The Macra Terror and Fury from the Deep)	1 November 2004 (Note: Re-released in slimmer packaging in late 2016)	2 December 2004 (Note: Re-released in slimmer packaging in July 2010)	2 November 2004

=== Third Doctor ===
Starring Jon Pertwee as the Third Doctor. All Third Doctor serials were released on DVD from 2001 to 2013. The entire Seasons 7 to 10 were released on Blu-ray between 2019 and 2025.

Season	Story no.	Serial name	Duration	Release date		
Season	Story no.	Serial name	Duration	R2	R4	R1
7	51	Spearhead from Space	4 × 25 min.	29 January 2001	7 September 2001	11 September 2001
7	51	Spearhead from Space (Special Edition) (Note: Only available as part of the Mannequin Mania box set in Regions 2 and 4. Only available individually in Region 1.)	4 × 25 min.	9 May 2011	2 June 2011	14 August 2012
7	51	Spearhead from Space (Blu-ray Edition) (Note: Includes bonus features exclusive to Blu-ray)	4 × 25 min.	15 July 2013	17 July 2013	13 August 2013
7	52	Doctor Who and the Silurians (Note: Only available as part of the Beneath the Surface box set in Regions 2 and 4. Available individually or in the box set in Region 1.)	7 × 25 min.	14 January 2008	5 March 2008	3 June 2008
7	53	The Ambassadors of Death	7 × 25 min.	1 October 2012	3 October 2012	9 October 2012
7	54	Inferno	7 × 25 min.	19 June 2006	6 July 2006	5 September 2006
7	54	Inferno (Special Edition)	7 × 25 min.	27 May 2013	5 June 2013	11 June 2013
7	51–54	Complete Season 7 (Note: Released as Doctor Who: The Collection – Season 7 in Region B. Released as Doctor Who – Jon Pertwee: Complete Season One in Region A.)	25 × 25 min.	3 March 2025 ^{(B)}	4 June 2025 ^{(B)}	3 June 2025
8	55	Terror of the Autons (Note: Only available as part of the Mannequin Mania box set in Regions 2 and 4. Only available individually in Region 1.)	4 × 25 min.	9 May 2011	2 June 2011	10 May 2011
8	56	The Mind of Evil	6 × 25 min.	3 June 2013	5 June 2013	11 June 2013
8	57	The Claws of Axos	4 × 25 min.	25 April 2005	7 July 2005	8 November 2005
8	57	The Claws of Axos (Special Edition)	4 × 25 min.	22 October 2012	7 November 2012	13 November 2012
8	58	Colony in Space	6 × 25 min.	3 October 2011	1 December 2011	8 November 2011
8	59	The Dæmons	5 × 25 min.	19 March 2012	19 April 2012	10 April 2012
8	55–59	Complete Season 8 (Note: Released as Doctor Who: The Collection – Season 8 in Region B. Released as Doctor Who – Jon Pertwee: Complete Season Two in Region A.)	25 × 25 min. 1 × 30 min. 1 × 90 min.	8 March 2021 ^{(B)}	26 May 2021 ^{(B)}	1 June 2021 ^{(B)}
9	60	Day of the Daleks	4 × 25 min.	12 September 2011	6 October 2011	13 September 2011
9	61	The Curse of Peladon (Note: Only available as part of the Peladon Tales box set in Regions 2 and 4. Only available individually in Region 1.)	4 × 25 min.	18 January 2010	4 March 2010	4 May 2010
9	62	The Sea Devils (Note: Only available as part of the Beneath the Surface box set in Regions 2 and 4. Available individually or in the box set in Region 1.)	6 × 25 min.	14 January 2008	5 March 2008	3 June 2008
9	63	The Mutants	6 × 25 min.	31 January 2011	3 February 2011	8 February 2011
9	64	The Time Monster (Note: Only available as part of the Myths and Legends box set in Regions 2 and 4. Only available individually in Region 1.)	6 × 25 min.	29 March 2010	3 June 2010	6 July 2010
9	60–64	Complete Season 9 (Note: Released as Doctor Who: The Collection – Season 9 in Region B. Released as Doctor Who – Jon Pertwee: Complete Season Three in Region A.)	26 × 25 min.	20 March 2023 ^{(B)}	23 August 2023 ^{(B)}	11 July 2023 ^{(B)}
10	65	The Three Doctors	4 × 25 min.	24 November 2003	12 November 2003	2 March 2004
10	65	The Three Doctors (Special Edition) (Note: Only available as part of the Revisitations 3 box set in Regions 2 and 4. Only available individually in Region 1.)	4 × 25 min.	13 February 2012	1 March 2012	13 March 2012
10	66	Carnival of Monsters	4 × 25 min.	15 July 2002	29 August 2002	1 July 2003
10	66	Carnival of Monsters (Special Edition) (Note: Only available as part of the Revisitations 2 box set in Regions 2 and 4. Only available individually in Region 1.)	4 × 25 min.	28 March 2011	5 May 2011	10 April 2012
10	67–68	Frontier in Space; Planet of the Daleks (Note: Double release known collectively as the Dalek War box set. Each serial has six episodes each.)	12 × 25 min.	5 October 2009	4 February 2010	2 March 2010
10	69	The Green Death	6 × 25 min.	10 May 2004	5 August 2004	1 March 2005
10	69	The Green Death (Special Edition) (Note: Also includes The Sarah Jane Adventures serial Death of the Doctor)	6 × 25 min.	5 August 2013	7 August 2013	13 August 2013
10	65–69	Complete Season 10 (Note: Released as Doctor Who: The Collection – Season 10 in Region B. Released as Doctor Who – Jon Pertwee: Complete Season Four in Region A.)	26 × 25 min. 1 × 150 min.	8 July 2019 ^{(B)}	13 November 2019 ^{(B)}	15 October 2019 ^{(B)}
11	70	The Time Warrior (Note: Available individually or in the Bred for War box set in Regions 2 and 4. Only available individually in Region 1.)	4 × 25 min.	3 September 2007	3 October 2007	1 April 2008
11	71	Invasion of the Dinosaurs (Note: Only available as part of the U.N.I.T. Files box set in Regions 2 and 4. Only available individually in Region 1.)	6 × 25 min.	9 January 2012	5 January 2012	10 January 2012
11	72	Death to the Daleks	4 × 25 min.	18 June 2012	5 July 2012	10 July 2012
11	73	The Monster of Peladon (Note: Only available as part of the Peladon Tales box set in Regions 2 and 4. Only available individually in Region 1.)	6 × 25 min.	18 January 2010	4 March 2010	4 May 2010
11	74	Planet of the Spiders (Note: Available individually or in the Regeneration box set in Region 2. Only available individually in Regions 1 and 4.)	6 × 25 min.	18 April 2011	2 June 2011	10 May 2011

=== Fourth Doctor ===
Starring Tom Baker as the Fourth Doctor. All Fourth Doctor serials were released on DVD from 2000 to 2013. The entire Seasons 12 to 15, 17, and 18 were released on Blu-ray from 2018 to 2025.

Season	Story no.	Serial name	Duration	Release date		
Season	Story no.	Serial name	Duration	R2	R4	R1
12	75	Robot	4 × 25 min.	4 June 2007	4 July 2007	14 August 2007
12	76	The Ark in Space	4 × 25 min.	8 April 2002	3 June 2002	6 August 2002
12	76	The Ark in Space (Special Edition)	4 × 25 min.	25 February 2013	27 February 2013	12 March 2013
12	77	The Sontaran Experiment (Note: Available individually or in the Bred for War box set in Regions 2 and 4. Only available individually in Region 1.)	2 × 25 min.	9 October 2006	7 August 2008	6 March 2007
12	78	Genesis of the Daleks (Note: Available individually or in The Complete Davros Collection box set in Regions 2 and 4. Only available individually in Region 1.)	6 × 25 min.	10 April 2006	4 May 2006	6 June 2006
12	79	Revenge of the Cybermen (Note: Only available as part of the Cybermen box set in Regions 2 and 4. Only available individually in Region 1.)	4 × 25 min.	9 August 2010	7 October 2010	2 November 2010
12	75–79	Complete Season 12 (Note: Released as Doctor Who: The Collection – Season 12 in Region B. Released as Doctor Who – Tom Baker: Complete Season One in Region A.)	20 × 25 min. 1 × 150 min.	2 July 2018 ^{(B)}	1 August 2018 ^{(B)}	19 June 2018 ^{(B)}
13	80	Terror of the Zygons (Note: Advanced release in region 2 as part of 'The Fourth Doctor Time Capsule' set with no special features on 29 July 2013)	4 × 25 min.	29 July 2013; 30 September 2013 (Note: The Region 2 release of Terror of the Zygons was released in advance as part of The Fourth Doctor Time Capsule box set without special features, and was later re-released on its own with special features.)	2 October 2013	8 October 2013
13	81	Planet of Evil	4 × 25 min.	15 October 2007	5 December 2007	4 March 2008
13	82	Pyramids of Mars (Note: Also available as part of The Doctors Revisited 1-4 in Regions 1 and 4)	4 × 25 min.	1 March 2004	10 June 2004	7 September 2004
13	83	The Android Invasion (Note: Only available as part of the U.N.I.T. Files box set in Regions 2 and 4. Only available individually in Region 1.)	4 × 25 min.	9 January 2012	5 January 2012	10 January 2012
13	84	The Brain of Morbius	4 × 25 min.	21 July 2008	2 October 2008	7 October 2008
13	85	The Seeds of Doom	6 × 25 min.	25 October 2010	2 December 2010	8 March 2011
13	80–85	Complete Season 13 (Note: Released as Doctor Who: The Collection – Season 13 in Region B. Released as Doctor Who – Tom Baker: Complete Season Two in Region A.)	26 × 25 min.	20 October 2025 ^{(B)}	3 December 2025	20 January 2026 ^{(B)}
14	86	The Masque of Mandragora	4 × 25 min.	8 February 2010	5 May 2010	4 May 2010
14	87	The Hand of Fear	4 × 25 min.	24 July 2006	7 September 2006	7 November 2006
14	88	The Deadly Assassin	4 × 25 min.	11 May 2009	2 July 2009	1 September 2009
14	89	The Face of Evil	4 × 25 min.	5 March 2012	5 April 2012	13 March 2012
14	90	The Robots of Death	4 × 25 min.	13 November 2000	2 July 2001	6 September 2001
14	90	The Robots of Death (Special Edition) (Note: Only available as part of the Revisitations 3 box set in Regions 2 and 4. Only available individually in Region 1.)	4 × 25 min.	13 February 2012	1 March 2012	13 March 2012
14	91	The Talons of Weng-Chiang	6 × 25 min.	28 April 2003	30 June 2003	7 October 2003
14	91	The Talons of Weng-Chiang (Special Edition) (Note: Only available as part of the Revisitations 1 box set in Regions 2 and 4. Only available individually in Region 1.)	6 × 25 min.	4 October 2010	2 December 2010	11 October 2011
14	86–91	Complete Season 14 (Note: Released as Doctor Who: The Collection – Season 14 in Region B. Released as Doctor Who – Tom Baker: Complete Season Three in Region A.)	26 × 25 min.	4 May 2020 ^{(B)}	15 July 2020 ^{(B)}	4 August 2020 ^{(B)}
15	92	Horror of Fang Rock	4 × 25 min.	17 January 2005	7 April 2005	6 September 2005
15	93	The Invisible Enemy (Note: Only available as part of the K9 Tales box set with the Doctor Who spin-off K-9 and Company in all regions)	4 × 25 min.	16 June 2008	4 September 2008	2 September 2008
15	94	Image of the Fendahl	4 × 25 min.	20 April 2009	4 June 2009	1 September 2009
15	95	The Sun Makers	4 × 25 min.	1 August 2011	1 September 2011	9 August 2011
15	96	Underworld (Note: Only available as part of the Myths and Legends box set in Regions 2 and 4. Only available individually in Region 1.)	4 × 25 min.	29 March 2010	3 June 2010	6 July 2010
15	97	The Invasion of Time (Note: Available individually or in the Bred for War box set in Regions 2 and 4. Only available individually in Region 1.)	6 × 25 min.	5 May 2008	3 July 2008	2 September 2008
15	92–97	Complete Season 15 (Note: Released as Doctor Who: The Collection – Season 15 in Region B. Released as Doctor Who – Tom Baker: Complete Season Four in Region A.)	26 × 25 min.	18 March 2024 ^{(B)}	19 June 2024 ^{(B)}	9 July 2024 ^{(B)}
16	98–103	The Key to Time (Note: Stories available in Region 1 only, with minimal restoration and extras (individually or as a box set))	26 × 25 min.	—N/a	—N/a	1 October 2002
16	98–103	The Key to Time: The Ribos Operation; The Pirate Planet; The Stones of Blood; The Androids of Tara; The Power of Kroll; The Armageddon Factor	26 × 25 min. (Note: Special edition. Known collectively as The Key to Time. Only available as a box set in Regions 2 and 4. Stories available individually or as a box set in Region 1. All serials contain four episodes each, apart from The Armageddon Factor, which has six episodes.)	24 September 2007 (Note: Limited release); 16 November 2009 (Note: Re-release)	7 November 2007	3 March 2009
17	104	Destiny of the Daleks (Note: Available individually or in The Complete Davros Collection box set in Regions 2 and 4. Only available individually in Region 1.)	4 × 25 min.	26 November 2007	6 February 2008	4 March 2008
17	105	City of Death	4 × 25 min.	7 November 2005	1 December 2005	8 November 2005
17	106	The Creature from the Pit	4 × 25 min.	3 May 2010	1 July 2010	7 September 2010
17	107	Nightmare of Eden	4 × 25 min.	2 April 2012	3 May 2012	8 May 2012
17	108	The Horns of Nimon (Note: Only available as part of the Myths and Legends box set in Regions 2 and 4. Only available individually in Region 1.)	4 × 25 min.	29 March 2010	3 June 2010	6 July 2010
17	108.5	Shada (Note: Only available as part of The Legacy Box set (Regions 2 and 4). Released with the same materials in the box set as Shada in Region 1.)	1 × 25 min. 4 × 18 min. 1 × 14 min.	7 January 2013	9 January 2013	8 January 2013
17	108.5	Shada (Animated Edition)	1 × 138 min.	4 December 2017^{(D,B)}	10 January 2018^{(D,B)}	4 September 2018
17	104–108 (Note: Including Shada)	Complete Season 17 (Note: Released as Doctor Who: The Collection – Season 17 in Region B. Released as Doctor Who – Tom Baker: Complete Season Six in Region A.)	27 × 25 min. 1 × 138 min. 4 × 18 min. 1 × 14 min.	20 December 2021 ^{(B)}	16 February 2022 ^{(B)}	5 April 2022 ^{(B)}
18	109	The Leisure Hive	4 × 25 min.	5 July 2004	7 October 2004	7 June 2005
18	110	Meglos	4 × 25 min.	10 January 2011	20 January 2011	11 January 2011
18	111–113	Full Circle; State of Decay; Warriors' Gate	12 × 25 min. (Note: Known collectively as The E-Space Trilogy. Each serial comprises four episodes.)	26 January 2009	9 April 2009	5 May 2009
18	114	The Keeper of Traken (Note: Only available as part of the New Beginnings box set in Regions 2 and 4. Available individually or in the box set in Region 1.)	4 × 25 min.	29 January 2007	7 March 2007	5 June 2007
18	115	Logopolis (Note: Available as part of the New Beginnings box set or the Regeneration box set in Region 2. Only available as part of the New Beginnings box set in Region 4. Available individually or as part of the New Beginnings box set in Region 1.)	4 × 25 min.	29 January 2007	7 March 2007	5 June 2007
18	109–115	Complete Season 18 (Note: Released as Doctor Who: The Collection – Season 18 in Region B. Released as Doctor Who – Tom Baker: Complete Season Seven in Region A.)	28 × 25 min. 1 × 50 min.	18 March 2019 ^{(B)}	17 April 2019 ^{(B)}	19 March 2019 ^{(B)}

=== Fifth Doctor ===
Starring Peter Davison as the Fifth Doctor. All Fifth Doctor serials were released on DVD from 1999 to 2011. The entire Seasons 19, 20 and 21 were released on Blu-ray from 2018 to 2026.

Season	Story no.	Serial name	Duration	Release date		
Season	Story no.	Serial name	Duration	R2	R4	R1
19	116	Castrovalva (Note: Only available as part of the New Beginnings box set in Regions 2 and 4. Available individually or in the box set in Region 1.)	4 × 25 min.	29 January 2007	7 March 2007	5 June 2007
19	117	Four to Doomsday	4 × 25 min.	15 September 2008	4 December 2008	6 January 2009
19	118	Kinda (Note: Only available as part of the Mara Tales box set in Regions 2 and 4. Only available individually in Region 1.)	4 × 25 min.	7 March 2011	7 April 2011	12 April 2011
19	119	The Visitation	4 × 25 min.	19 January 2004	8 April 2004	1 March 2005
19	119	The Visitation (Special Edition)	4 × 25 min.	6 May 2013	15 May 2013	14 May 2013
19	120	Black Orchid	2 × 25 min.	14 April 2008	5 June 2008	5 August 2008
19	121	Earthshock	4 × 25 min.	18 August 2003	1 October 2003	7 September 2004
19	122	Time-Flight (Note: Only available as part of the Time-Flight/Arc of Infinity box set in Regions 2 and 4. Only available individually in Region 1.)	4 × 25 min.	6 August 2007	5 September 2007	6 November 2007
19	116–122	Complete Season 19 (Note: Released as Doctor Who: The Collection – Season 19 in Region B. Released as Doctor Who – Peter Davison: Complete Season One in Region A.)	26 × 25 min. 1 × 30 min. 1 × 8 min.	10 December 2018 ^{(B)}	23 January 2019 ^{(B)}	4 December 2018 ^{(B)}
20	123	Arc of Infinity (Note: Only available as part of the Time-Flight/Arc of Infinity box set in Regions 2 and 4. Only available individually in Region 1.)	4 × 25 min.	6 August 2007	5 September 2007	6 November 2007
20	124	Snakedance (Note: Only available as part of the Mara Tales box set in Regions 2 and 4. Only available individually in Region 1.)	4 × 25 min.	7 March 2011	7 April 2011	12 April 2011
20	125–127	Mawdryn Undead; Terminus; Enlightenment	12 × 25 min. (Note: Known collectively as The Black Guardian Trilogy. Each serial comprises four episodes.); 1 × 75 min. (Note: The 75-minute long episode is an Enlightenment Special Edition)	10 August 2009	5 November 2009	3 November 2009
20	128	The King's Demons (Note: Only available as part of the Kamelion Tales box set in Regions 2 and 4. Only available individually in Region 1.)	2 × 25 min.	14 June 2010	5 August 2010	7 September 2010
20	129	"The Five Doctors" (Special Edition)	1 × 100 min. (Note: "Special edition" of "The Five Doctors" with restored footage and new special effects)	1 November 1999	9 October 2000	11 September 2001
20	129	"The Five Doctors" (25th Anniversary Edition)	1 × 90 min. (Note: Broadcast version of "The Five Doctors"); 1 × 100 min.	3 March 2008	5 June 2008	5 August 2008
20	123–129	Complete Season 20 (Note: Released as Doctor Who: The Collection – Season 20 in Region B. Released as Doctor Who – Peter Davison: Complete Season Two in Region A.)	22 × 25 min. 1 × 90 min. 1 × 100 min.	18 September 2023 ^{(B)}	24 July 2024 ^{(B)}	4 June 2024 ^{(B)}
21	130	Warriors of the Deep (Note: Only available as part of the Beneath the Surface box set in Regions 2 and 4. Available individually or in the box set in Region 1.)	4 × 25 min.	14 January 2008	5 March 2008	3 June 2008
21	131	The Awakening (Note: Only available as part of the Earthstory box set in Regions 2 and 4. Only available individually in Region 1.)	2 × 25 min.	20 June 2011	4 August 2011	12 July 2011
21	132	Frontios	4 × 25 min.	30 May 2011	7 July 2011	14 June 2011
21	133	Resurrection of the Daleks (Note: Available individually or in The Complete Davros Collection box set in Regions 2 and 4. Only available individually in Region 1.)	4 × 25 min. (Note: Resurrection of the Daleks was originally intended to comprise four 25-minute episodes, but was broadcast as two 46-minute episodes due to the BBC's coverage of the 1984 Winter Olympics. The DVD contains the story in a four-part format.)	18 November 2002	30 January 2003	1 July 2003
21	133	Resurrection of the Daleks (Special Edition) (Note: Only available as part of the Revisitations 2 box set in Regions 2 and 4. Only available individually in Region 1.)	4 × 25 min. (Note: Four-episode version); 2 × 46 min. (Note: Broadcast version)	28 March 2011	5 May 2011	12 June 2012
21	134	Planet of Fire (Note: Only available as part of the Kamelion Tales box set in Regions 2 and 4. Only available individually in Region 1.)	4 × 25 min. (Note: Broadcast version); 1 × 66 min. (Note: Special edition)	14 June 2010	5 August 2010	7 September 2010
21	135	The Caves of Androzani (Note: Available individually or in the Regeneration box set in Region 2. Only available individually in Regions 1 and 4.)	4 × 25 min.	18 June 2001	7 January 2002	2 April 2002
21	135	The Caves of Androzani (Special Edition) (Note: Only available as part of the Revisitations 1 box set in Regions 2 and 4. Only available individually in Region 1.)	4 × 25 min.	4 October 2010	2 December 2010	14 February 2012
21	130–135	Complete Season 21	30 × 25 min. 2 × 46 min. (Note: Broadcast version of Resurrection of the Daleks); 1 × 66 min. (Note: Special edition of Planet of Fire)	16 March 2026 ^{(B)}	6 May 2026 ^{(B)}	7 July 2026 ^{(B)}

=== Sixth Doctor ===
Starring Colin Baker as the Sixth Doctor. All Sixth Doctor serials were released on DVD from 2001 to 2009. The entire Seasons 22 and 23 were released on Blu-ray in 2022 and 2019, respectively.

Season	Story no.	Serial name	Duration	Release date		
Season	Story no.	Serial name	Duration	R2	R4	R1
21	136	The Twin Dilemma	4 × 25 min.	7 September 2009	3 December 2009	5 January 2010
21	136	Complete Season 21	4 × 25 min.	16 March 2026 ^{(B)}	6 May 2026 ^{(B)}	7 July 2026 ^{(B)}
22	137	Attack of the Cybermen	2 × 45 min.	16 March 2009	7 May 2009	7 July 2009
22	138	Vengeance on Varos	2 × 45 min.	15 October 2001	7 January 2002	6 September 2005
22	138	Vengeance on Varos (Special Edition)	2 × 45 min.	10 September 2012	10 September 2012	11 September 2012
22	139	The Mark of the Rani	2 × 45 min.	4 September 2006	1 November 2006	7 November 2006
22	140	The Two Doctors (Note: Available individually or in the Bred for War box set in Regions 2 and 4. Only available individually in Region 1.)	3 × 45 min.	8 September 2003	7 January 2004	1 June 2004
22	141	Timelash	2 × 45 min.	9 July 2007	1 August 2007	1 April 2008
22	142	Revelation of the Daleks (Note: Available individually or in The Complete Davros Collection.)	2 × 45 min.	11 July 2005	1 September 2005	6 June 2006
22	137–142	Complete Season 22 (Note: Released as Doctor Who: The Collection – Season 22 in Region B. Released as Doctor Who – Colin Baker: Complete Season One in Region A.)	14 × 45 min. 2 × 50 min. 2 × 5 min.	20 June 2022 ^{(B)}	14 September 2022 ^{(B)}	18 October 2022 ^{(B)}
23	143	The Trial of a Time Lord: The Mysterious Planet; Mindwarp; Terror of the Vervoids; The Ultimate Foe	13 × 25 min. (Note: Each serial in this season comprises four episodes, with the exception of The Ultimate Foe, which was made up of two episodes.); 1 × 30 min.	29 September 2008	5 February 2009	7 October 2008
23	143	Complete Season 23 (Note: Released as Doctor Who: The Collection – Season 23 in Region B. Released as Doctor Who – Colin Baker: Complete Season Two in Region A.)	13 × 25 min. (Note: Each serial in this season comprises four episodes, with the exception of The Ultimate Foe, which was made up of two episodes.); 14 × 30 min. 1 × 35 min. 1 × 100 min.	7 October 2019 ^{(B)}	4 December 2019 ^{(B)}	3 December 2019 ^{(B)}

=== Seventh Doctor ===
Starring Sylvester McCoy as the Seventh Doctor. All Seventh Doctor serials were released on DVD from 2001 to 2012. The entire Seasons 24 to 26 were released on Blu-ray between 2020 and 2024.

Season	Story no.	Serial name	Duration	Release date		
Season	Story no.	Serial name	Duration	R2	R4	R1
24	144	Time and the Rani (Note: Available individually or in the Regeneration box set in Region 2. Only available individually in Regions 1 & 4.)	4 × 25 min.	13 September 2010	4 November 2010	14 June 2011
24	145	Paradise Towers	4 × 25 min.	18 July 2011	7 September 2011	9 August 2011
24	146	Delta and the Bannermen	3 × 25 min.	22 June 2009	6 August 2009	1 September 2009
24	147	Dragonfire (Note: Only available as part of the Ace Adventures box set in Regions 2 and 4. Only available individually in Region 1.)	3 × 25 min.	7 May 2012	7 June 2012	8 May 2012
24	144–147	Complete Season 24 (Note: Released as Doctor Who: The Collection – Season 24 in Region B. Released as Doctor Who – Sylvester McCoy: Complete Season One in Region A.)	14 × 25 min. 14 × 30 min.	21 June 2021 ^{(B)}	25 August 2021 ^{(B)}	21 September 2021 ^{(B)}
25	148	Remembrance of the Daleks	4 × 25 min.	26 February 2001	8 May 2002	2 April 2002
25	148	Remembrance of the Daleks (Special Edition) (Note: Available individually or in The Complete Davros Collection box set in Regions 2 and 4. Only available individually in Region 1.)	4 × 25 min.	26 November 2007; 20 July 2009 (Note: The Regions 2 and 4 releases of the Special Edition of Remembrance of the Daleks was originally only available as part of The Complete Davros Collection box set, but was later re-released on its own.)	2 June 2008; 1 October 2009 (Note: The Regions 2 and 4 releases of the Special Edition of Remembrance of the Daleks was originally only available as part of The Complete Davros Collection box set, but was later re-released on its own.)	2 March 2010
25	149	The Happiness Patrol (Note: Only available as part of the Ace Adventures box set in Regions 2 and 4. Only available individually in Region 1.)	3 × 25 min.	7 May 2012	7 June 2012	8 May 2012
25	150	Silver Nemesis (Note: Only available as part of the Cybermen box set in Regions 2 and 4. Only available individually in Region 1.)	3 × 25 min.	9 August 2010	7 October 2010	2 November 2010
25	151	The Greatest Show in the Galaxy	4 × 25 min.	30 July 2012	16 August 2012	14 August 2012
25	148–151	Complete Season 25 (Note: Released as Doctor Who: The Collection – Season 25 in Region B.)	14 × 25 min.	21 October 2024 ^{(B)}	18 December 2024 ^{(B)}	25 February 2025 ^{(B)}
26	152	Battlefield	1 × 96 min.	26 December 2008	19 March 2009	5 May 2009
26	153	Ghost Light	3 × 25 min.	20 September 2004	3 February 2005	7 June 2005
26	154	The Curse of Fenric	1 × 104 min.	6 October 2003	11 February 2004	1 June 2004
26	155	Survival	3 × 25 min.	16 April 2007	6 June 2007	14 August 2007
26	152–155	Complete Season 26 (Note: Released as Doctor Who: The Collection – Season 26 in Region B. Released as Doctor Who – Sylvester McCoy: Complete Season Three in Region A.)	14 × 25 min. 8 × 30 min. 1 × 96 min. 1 × 104 min.	27 January 2020 ^{(B)}	11 March 2020 ^{(B)}	24 March 2020 ^{(B)}

=== Eighth Doctor ===
Starring Paul McGann as the Eighth Doctor. The only Eighth Doctor full television adventure was released on DVD in 2001 and Blu-ray in 2016.

Season	Story no.	Serial name	Duration	Release date		
Season	Story no.	Serial name	Duration	R2	R4	R1
—N/a	156	Doctor Who: The Movie (Note: Available individually or in the Regeneration box set in Region 2)	85 min.	13 August 2001	—N/a	—N/a
—N/a	156	Doctor Who: The Movie (Special Edition) (Note: Only available as part of the Revisitations 1 box set in Region 2. Available individually or in the box set in Region 4. Only available individually in Region 1.)	85 min.	4 October 2010	2 December 2010 (Box set); 3 March 2011 (Individual)	8 February 2011
—N/a	156	Doctor Who: The Movie (Blu-ray Edition)	85 min.	19 September 2016 ^{(B)}	—N/a	—N/a
—N/a	156	Doctor Who: The Movie (Restoration)	89 min.	25 May 2026 ^{(B,UHD)}	—N/a	—N/a

=== Ninth Doctor ===
Starring Christopher Eccleston as the Ninth Doctor. All Ninth Doctor episodes were released in Region 2 on DVD in 2005 and Blu-ray in 2013.

Series	Story no.	Episode name	Duration	Release date		
Series	Story no.	Episode name	Duration	R2	R4	R1
1	157–159	Doctor Who: Volume 1 "Rose" – "The Unquiet Dead"	3 × 45 min.	16 May 2005	17 June 2005	7 November 2006
1	160–161	Doctor Who: Volume 2 "Aliens of London" – "Dalek"	3 × 45 min.	13 June 2005	3 August 2005	7 November 2006
1	162–164	Doctor Who: Volume 3 "The Long Game" – "The Doctor Dances"	4 × 45 min.	1 August 2005	31 August 2005	7 November 2006
1	165–166	Doctor Who: Volume 4 "Boom Town" – "The Parting of the Ways"	3 × 45 min.	5 September 2005	6 October 2005	7 November 2006
1	157–166	Doctor Who: The Complete First Series	13 × 45 min.	21 November 2005 ^{(D)} 4 November 2013 ^{(B)} (Note: Part of The Complete Series 1–7); 31 August 2015 ^{(B)}	8 December 2005 ^{(D)} 4 December 2013 ^{(B)}	14 February 2006 (Note: 4 July 2006 in the United States) ^{(D)} 5 November 2013 ^{(B)} 21 June 2016 ^{(B)}

=== Tenth Doctor ===
Starring David Tennant as the Tenth Doctor. All Tenth Doctor episodes were released on DVD and Blu-ray from 2006 to 2013.

Series	Story no.	Episode name	Duration	Release date		
Series	Story no.	Episode name	Duration	R2	R4	R1
2	167–168	Doctor Who: Series 2, Volume 1 "The Christmas Invasion" & "New Earth"	1 × 60 min. 1 × 45 min.	1 May 2006	20 July 2006	—N/a
2	169–171	Doctor Who: Series 2, Volume 2 "Tooth and Claw" – "The Girl in the Fireplace"	3 × 45 min.	5 June 2006	17 August 2006	—N/a
2	172–173	Doctor Who: Series 2, Volume 3 "Rise of the Cybermen" – "The Idiot's Lantern"	3 × 45 min.	10 July 2006	7 September 2006	—N/a
2	174–175	Doctor Who: Series 2, Volume 4 "The Impossible Planet" – "Love & Monsters"	3 × 45 min.	7 August 2006	5 October 2006	—N/a
2	176–177	Doctor Who: Series 2, Volume 5 "Fear Her" – "Doomsday"	3 × 45 min.	25 September 2006	2 November 2006	—N/a
2	167–177	Doctor Who: The Complete Second Series (includes "The Christmas Invasion" and "Children in Need")	1 × 7 min. 1 × 60 min. 13 × 45 min.	20 November 2006 ^{(D)} 4 November 2013 ^{(B)} 31 August 2015 ^{(B)}	6 December 2006 ^{(D)} 4 December 2013 ^{(B)}	16 January 2007 (Note: 6 February 2007 in Canada) ^{(D)} 5 November 2013 ^{(B)}
2	167–172	Doctor Who: Series 2, Part 1 "The Christmas Invasion" – "The Age of Steel"	1 × 60 min. 6 × 45 min.	—N/a	—N/a	8 April 2014
2	173–177	Doctor Who: Series 2, Part 2 "The Idiot's Lantern" – "Doomsday"	7 × 45 min.	—N/a	—N/a	13 May 2014
3	178	Doctor Who: "The Runaway Bride"	1 × 60 min.	2 April 2007	4 July 2007	—N/a
3	179–181	Doctor Who: Series 3, Volume 1 "Smith and Jones" – "Gridlock"	3 × 45 min.	21 May 2007	1 August 2007	—N/a
3	182–184	Doctor Who: Series 3, Volume 2 "Daleks in Manhattan" – "42"	4 × 45 min.	25 June 2007	5 September 2007	—N/a
3	185–186	Doctor Who: Series 3, Volume 3 "Human Nature" – "Blink"	3 × 45 min.	23 July 2007	3 October 2007	—N/a
3	187	Doctor Who: Series 3, Volume 4 "Utopia" / "The Sound of Drums" / "Last of the Time Lords"	2 × 45 min. 1 × 52 min.	20 August 2007	7 November 2007	—N/a
3	178–187	Doctor Who: The Complete Third Series (includes "The Runaway Bride")	1 × 60 min. 12 × 45 min. 1 × 52 min.	5 November 2007 ^{(D)} 4 December 2013 ^{(B)} 31 August 2015 ^{(B)}	5 December 2007 ^{(D)} 4 December 2013 ^{(B)}	6 November 2007 ^{(D)} 5 November 2013 ^{(B)}
3	178–183	Doctor Who: Series 3, Part 1 "The Runaway Bride" – "The Lazarus Experiment"	1 × 60 min. 6 × 45 min.	—N/a	—N/a	10 June 2014
3	184–187	Doctor Who: Series 3, Part 2 "42" – "Last of the Time Lords"	6 × 45 min. 1 × 52 min.	—N/a	—N/a	8 July 2014
—N/a	—N/a	Doctor Who: The Infinite Quest	1 × 45 min.	5 November 2007	5 June 2008	18 November 2008
4	188	Doctor Who: Voyage of the Damned "Time Crash" & "Voyage of the Damned"	1 × 8 min. 1 × 72 min.	10 March 2008	1 July 2008	—N/a
4	189–191	Doctor Who: Series 4, Volume 1 "Partners in Crime" – "Planet of the Ood"	2 × 50 min. 1 × 45 min.	2 June 2008	7 August 2008	—N/a
4	192–194	Doctor Who: Series 4, Volume 2 "The Sontaran Stratagem" – "The Unicorn and the Wasp"	4 × 45 min.	7 July 2008	4 September 2008	—N/a
4	195–196	Doctor Who: Series 4, Volume 3 "Silence in the Library" – "Midnight"	3 × 45 min.	4 August 2008	2 October 2008	—N/a
4	197–198	Doctor Who: Series 4, Volume 4 "Turn Left" – "Journey's End"	1 × 50 min. 1 × 45 min. 1 × 65 min.	1 September 2008	6 November 2008	—N/a
4	188–198	Doctor Who: The Complete Fourth Series (includes "Voyage of the Damned" and "Time Crash")	1 × 8 min. 1 × 72 min. 9 × 45 min. 3 × 50 min. 1 × 65 min.	17 November 2008 ^{(D)} 4 December 2013 ^{(B)} 31 August 2015 ^{(B)}	4 December 2008 ^{(D)} 4 December 2013 ^{(B)}	18 November 2008 ^{(D)} 5 November 2013 ^{(B)}
4	188–193	Doctor Who: Series 4, Part 1 "Voyage of the Damned" – "The Doctor's Daughter"	1 × 72 min. 2 × 50 min. 4 × 45 min.	—N/a	—N/a	5 August 2014
4	194–198	Doctor Who: Series 4, Part 2 "The Unicorn and the Wasp" – "Journey's End"	5 × 45 min. 1 × 50 min. 1 × 65 min.	—N/a	—N/a	2 September 2014
2008–10 specials	199	Doctor Who: The Next Doctor "The Next Doctor" "Music of the Spheres"; Doctor Who Prom (2008)	1 × 60 min. 1 × 7 min. 1 × 95 min.	19 January 2009	5 March 2009 ^{(D)} 3 June 2010 ^{(B)}	15 September 2009
2008–10 specials	200	Doctor Who: "Planet of the Dead"	1 × 60 min.	29 June 2009^{(D,B)}	7 July 2009 ^{(D)} 1 October 2009 ^{(B)}	28 July 2009^{(D,B)}
2008–10 specials	201–202	Doctor Who: 2009 Winter Specials "The Waters of Mars" & "The End of Time"	2 × 60 min. 1 × 75 min.	11 January 2010	—N/a	—N/a
2008–10 specials	201	Doctor Who: "The Waters of Mars"	1 × 60 min.	—N/a	4 February 2010^{(D,B)}	2 February 2010^{(D,B)}
2008–10 specials	202	Doctor Who: "The End of Time"	1 × 60 min. 1 × 75 min.	—N/a	4 March 2010^{(D,B)}	2 February 2010^{(D,B)}
2008–10 specials	199–202	Doctor Who: The Complete Specials (includes "Music of the Spheres" and 2008 Prom)	1 × 7 min. 4 × 60 min. 1 × 75 min.	11 January 2010^{(D,B)}	1 July 2010 ^{(D)} 29 June 2010 ^{(B)}	2 February 2010^{(D,B)}
—N/a	—N/a	Doctor Who: Dreamland	1 × 12 min. 5 × 6 min.	1 February 2010	3 June 2010	5 October 2010
2, 3, 4,2008–10 specials	167–202	Doctor Who: The Complete David Tennant Years	5 × 6 min. 2 × 7 min. 1 × 8 min. 1 × 12 min. 35 × 45 min. 4 × 50 min. 6 × 60 min. 1 × 65 min. 1 × 72 min. 1 × 75 min.	10 November 2014	—N/a	11 October 2011^{(D)} 17 September 2019^{(B)}

=== Eleventh Doctor ===
Starring Matt Smith as the Eleventh Doctor. All Eleventh Doctor episodes were released on DVD and Blu-ray from 2010 to 2014.

Series	Story no.	Episode name	Duration	Release date		
Series	Story no.	Episode name	Duration	R2	R4	R1
5	203–205	Doctor Who: Series 5, Volume 1 "The Eleventh Hour" – "Victory of the Daleks"	1 × 65 min. 2 × 45 min.	7 June 2010^{(D,B)}	1 July 2010^{(D,B)}	—N/a
5	206–207	Doctor Who: Series 5, Volume 2 "The Time of Angels" – "The Vampires of Venice"	2 × 45 min. 1 × 50 min.	5 July 2010^{(D,B)}	5 August 2010^{(D,B)}	—N/a
5	208–209	Doctor Who: Series 5, Volume 3 "Amy's Choice" – "Cold Blood"	3 × 45 min.	2 August 2010^{(D,B)}	2 September 2010^{(D,B)}	—N/a
5	210–212	Doctor Who: Series 5, Volume 4 "Vincent and the Doctor" – "The Big Bang"	2 × 45 min. 1 × 50 min. 1 × 55 min.	6 September 2010^{(D,B)}	7 October 2010^{(D,B)}	—N/a
5	203–212	Doctor Who: The Complete Fifth Series	8 × 45 min. 3 × 50 min. 1 × 55 min. 1 × 65 min.	8 November 2010^{(D,B)}	2 December 2010^{(D,B)}	9 November 2010^{(D,B)}
5	203–207	Doctor Who: Series 5, Part 1 "The Eleventh Hour" – "The Vampires of Venice"	1 × 65 min. 4 × 45 min. 1 × 50 min.	—N/a	—N/a	15 March 2016
5	208–212	Doctor Who: Series 5, Part 2 "Amy's Choice" – "The Big Bang"	1 × 55 min. 5 × 45 min. 1 × 50 min.	—N/a	—N/a	26 July 2016
6	213	Doctor Who: A Christmas Carol "A Christmas Carol" & Doctor Who Prom (2010)	1 × 60 min.	24 January 2011^{(D,B)}	3 March 2011^{(D,B)}	15 February 2011^{(D,B)}
6	214–218	Doctor Who: Series 6, Part 1 "The Impossible Astronaut" – "A Good Man Goes to War"	6 × 45 min. 1 × 50 min.	11 July 2011^{(D,B)}	4 August 2011^{(D,B)}	19 July 2011^{(D,B)}
6	219–224	Doctor Who: Series 6, Part 2 "Let's Kill Hitler" – "The Wedding of River Song"	4 × 45 min. 2 × 50 min.	10 October 2011^{(D,B)}	3 November 2011^{(D,B)}	8 November 2011^{(D,B)}
6	213–224	Doctor Who: The Complete Sixth Series (includes "A Christmas Carol")	1 × 60 min. 3 × 50 min. 10 × 45 min.	21 November 2011^{(D,B)}	1 December 2011^{(D,B)}	22 November 2011^{(D,B)}
7	225	Doctor Who: "The Doctor, the Widow and the Wardrobe"	1 × 60 min.	16 January 2012^{(D,B)}	1 March 2012^{(D,B)}	14 February 2012^{(D,B)}
7	226–230	Doctor Who: Series 7, Part 1 "Pond Life" "Asylum of the Daleks" – "The Angels Take Manhattan"	4 × 45 min. 1 × 50 min. 1 × 5 min.	29 October 2012^{(D,B)}	14 November 2012^{(D,B)}	13 November 2012^{(D,B)}
7	231	Doctor Who: "The Snowmen"	1 × 60 min.	—N/a	—N/a	28 May 2013^{(D,B)}
7	232–239	Doctor Who: Series 7, Part 2 "The Snowmen" (Region 2 and 4 only) "The Bells of Saint John" – "The Name of the Doctor"	1 × 60 min. 8 × 45 min.	27 May 2013^{(D,B)}	22 May 2013^{(D,B)}	28 May 2013^{(D,B)}
7	225–239	Doctor Who: The Complete Seventh Series (includes "The Doctor, the Widow and the Wardrobe" and "The Snowmen")	2 × 60 min. 1 × 50 min. 12 × 45 min.	28 October 2013^{(D,B)}	30 October 2013^{(D,B)}	24 September 2013^{(D,B)}
2013 specials	240	Doctor Who: The Day of the Doctor "The Day of the Doctor" "The Night of the Doctor" "The Last Day"	1 × 77 min. 1 × 7 min. 1 × 3 min.	2 December 2013^{(D,3D)}	4 December 2013^{(D,B)}	10 December 2013^{(D,B)}
2013 specials	213, 225, 231, 241	Doctor Who: The Time of the Doctor & Other Eleventh Doctor Christmas Specials "The Time of the Doctor" "A Christmas Carol" "The Doctor, the Widow and the Wardrobe" "The Snowmen"	4 × 60 min.	20 January 2014^{(D,B)}	22 January 2014^{(D,B)}	—N/a
2013 specials	241	Doctor Who: "The Time of the Doctor"	1 × 60 min.	—N/a	—N/a	4 March 2014^{(D,B)}
2013 specials	239–241	Doctor Who: 50th Anniversary Collector's Edition "The Name of the Doctor" "The Day of the Doctor" "The Time of the Doctor" "The Night of the Doctor" "The Last Day"; An Adventure in Space and Time; The Five(ish) Doctors Reboot; Doctor Who: The Ultimate Guide; Doctor Who Prom (2013)	1 × 45 min. 1 × 77 min. 1 × 60 min. 1 × 7 min. 1 × 3 min. 1 × 90 min. 1 × 30 min. 1 × 120 min. 1 × 70 min.	8 September 2014^{D,B)} Not Region Locked	10 September 2014^{(D,B)}	—N/a
5, 6, 7, 2013 specials	203–241	Doctor Who: The Complete Matt Smith Years	30 × 45 min. 7 × 50 min. 1 × 55 min. 4 × 60 min. 1 × 65 min. 1 × 77 min.	—N/a	—N/a	4 November 2014^{(B)} 2 October 2018^{(D)}

=== Twelfth Doctor ===
Starring Peter Capaldi as the Twelfth Doctor. All Twelfth Doctor episodes were released on DVD and Blu-ray from 2014 to 2018.

Series	Story no.	Episode name	Duration	Release date		
Series	Story no.	Episode name	Duration	R2	R4	R1
8	242	Doctor Who: "Deep Breath"	1 × 76 min.	15 September 2014^{(D,B)}	10 September 2014^{(D,B)}	9 September 2014^{(D,B)}
8	242–252	Doctor Who: The Complete Eighth Series	1 × 76 min. 1 × 60 min. 10 × 45 min.	24 November 2014^{(D,B)}	19 November 2014^{(D,B)}	9 December 2014^{(D,B)}
8	252	Doctor Who: "Dark Water" / "Death in Heaven"	1 × 45 min. 1 × 60 min.	—N/a	—N/a	22 September 2015 (3D)
8	242–247	Doctor Who: Series 8, Part 1 "Deep Breath" – "The Caretaker"	1 × 76 min. 5 × 45 min.	—N/a	—N/a	20 September 2016^{(D)}
8	248–252	Doctor Who: Series 8, Part 2 "Kill the Moon" – "Death in Heaven"	1 × 60 min. 5 × 45 min.	—N/a	—N/a	13 December 2016^{(D)}
9	253	Doctor Who: "Last Christmas"	1 × 60 min.	26 January 2015^{(D,B)}	28 January 2015^{(D,B)}	17 February 2015^{(D,B)}
9	254–257	Doctor Who: Series 9, Part 1 "The Magician's Apprentice" – "The Woman Who Lived"	2 × 50 min. 4 × 45 min.	2 November 2015^{(D,B)}	4 November 2015^{(D,B)}	3 November 2015^{(D,B)}
9	258–262	Doctor Who: Series 9, Part 2 "The Zygon Invasion" – "Hell Bent"	1 × 50 min. 1 × 55 min. 1 × 60 min. 3 × 45 min.	4 January 2016^{(D,B)}	13 January 2016^{(D,B)}	26 January 2016^{(D,B)}
9	263	Doctor Who: "The Husbands of River Song"	1 × 60 min.	25 January 2016^{(D,B)}	27 January 2016^{(D,B)}	23 February 2016^{(D,B)}
9	253–263	Doctor Who: The Complete Ninth Series (includes "Last Christmas" and "The Husbands of River Song")	3 × 50 min. 1 × 55 min. 3 × 60 min. 7 × 45 min.	7 March 2016^{(D,B)}	9 March 2016^{(D,B)}	5 April 2016^{(D,B)}
10	264	Doctor Who: "The Return of Doctor Mysterio"	1 × 60 min.	23 January 2017^{(D,B)}	22 February 2017^{(D,B)}	21 February 2017^{(D,B)}
10	265–270	Doctor Who: Series 10, Part 1 "The Pilot" – "Extremis"	2 × 50 min. 4 × 45 min.	29 May 2017^{(D,B)}	31 May 2017^{(D,B)}	6 June 2017^{(D,B)}
10	271–275	Doctor Who: Series 10, Part 2 "The Pyramid at the End of the World" – "The Doctor Falls"	1 × 60 min. 5 × 45 min.	24 July 2017^{(D,B)}	16 August 2017^{(D,B)}	12 September 2017^{(D,B)}
10	264–275	Doctor Who: The Complete Tenth Series (includes "The Return of Doctor Mysterio")	2 × 60 min. 2 × 50 min. 9 × 45 min.	13 November 2017^{(D,B)}	29 November 2017^{(D,B)}	7 November 2017^{(D,B)}
10	276	Doctor Who: "Twice Upon a Time"	1 × 60 min.	22 January 2018^{(D,B)} 24 September 2018^{(UHD)}	7 February 2018^{(D,B)} 17 October 2018^{(UHD)}	13 February 2018^{(D,B)} 25 September 2018^{(UHD)}
8, 9, 10	242–276	Doctor Who: The Complete Peter Capaldi Years	26 × 45 min. 5 × 50 min. 1 × 55 min. 7 × 60 min. 1 × 76 min.	—N/a	—N/a	13 February 2018^{(B)} 2 October 2018^{(D)}

=== Thirteenth Doctor ===
Starring Jodie Whittaker as the Thirteenth Doctor. All Thirteenth Doctor episodes were released on DVD and Blu-ray from 2019 to 2023.

Series	Story no.	Episode name	Duration	Release date		
Series	Story no.	Episode name	Duration	R2	R4	R1
11	277–286	Doctor Who: The Complete Eleventh Series	9 × 50 min. 1 × 65 min.	14 January 2019^{(D,B)}	6 February 2019^{(D,B)}	29 January 2019^{(D,B)}
11	287	Doctor Who: "Resolution"	1 × 60 min.	18 February 2019^{(D,B)}	6 March 2019^{(D,B)}	19 February 2019^{(D,B)}
12	287–295	Doctor Who: The Complete Twelfth Series (includes "Resolution" in the Regions 2 & 4)	7 × 50 min. 3 × 60 min. 1 × 65 min.	4 May 2020^{(D,B)}	3 June 2020^{(D,B)}	9 June 2020^{(D,B)}
12	296	Doctor Who: "Revolution of the Daleks"	1 × 70 min.	25 January 2021^{(D,B)}	24 March 2021^{(D,B)}	2 March 2021^{(D,B)}
13	297	Doctor Who – Flux: The Complete Thirteenth Series	3 × 50 min. 1 × 55 min. 2 × 60 min.	24 January 2022^{(D,B)}	16 March 2022^{(D,B)}	15 February 2022^{(D,B)}
2022 specials	298–299	Doctor Who: "Eve of the Daleks" & "Legend of the Sea Devils"	1 × 50 min. 1 × 60 min.	23 May 2022^{(D,B)}	13 July 2022^{(D,B)}	28 June 2022^{(D,B)}
2022 specials	300	Doctor Who: "The Power of the Doctor"	1 × 90 min.	7 November 2022^{(D,B)}	7 December 2022^{(D,B)}	13 December 2022^{(D,B)}
2022 specials	298–300	Doctor Who: The Series 13 Specials	1 × 50 min. 1 × 60 min. 1 × 90 min.	7 November 2022^{(B)}	—N/a	—N/a
11, 12, 13, 2022 specials	277–300	Doctor Who: The Complete Jodie Whittaker Years (DVD includes "Twice Upon a Time")	20 × 50 min. 1 × 55 min. 7 × 60 min. 2 × 65 min. 1 × 70 min. 1 × 90 min.	—N/a	—N/a	25 April 2023^{(D)} 5 November 2024^{(B)}

=== Fourteenth Doctor ===
Starring David Tennant as the Fourteenth Doctor. All Fourteenth Doctor episodes were released on DVD and Blu-ray in 2023.

Series	Story no.	Episode name	Duration	Release date		
Series	Story no.	Episode name	Duration	R2	R4	R1
2023 specials	301–303	Doctor Who: 60th Anniversary Specials	3 × 60 min.	18 December 2023^{(D,B)}	18 December 2024 ^{(D)} 22 January 2025 ^{(B)}	10 December 2024^{(D,B)}

=== Fifteenth Doctor ===
Starring Ncuti Gatwa as the Fifteenth Doctor. Fifteenth Doctor episodes have been released on DVD and Blu-ray since 2024.

Series	Story no.	Episode name	Duration	Release date		
Series	Story no.	Episode name	Duration	R2	R4	R1
14	304	Doctor Who: "The Church on Ruby Road"	1 × 55 min.	12 February 2024^{(D,B)}	—N/a	—N/a
14	304–311	Doctor Who: Season One (includes "The Church on Ruby Road")	2 × 55 min. 7 × 45 min.	12 August 2024^{(D,B)}	13 August 2025^{(D,B)}	24 June 2025^{(D,B)}
15	312	Doctor Who: "Joy to the World"	1 × 55 min.	27 January 2025^{(D,B)}	—N/a	—N/a
15	312–319	Doctor Who: Season Two (includes "Joy to the World")	1 × 55 min. 7 × 45 min. 1 × 65 min.	18 August 2025^{(D,B)}	15 July 2026^{(D,B)}	2 June 2026^{(D,B)}

== Special releases ==
=== Compilations ===
Some releases compile previously released serials and episodes from both the classic and/or revived series. Generally, these compilations do not carry over the bonus material from previous releases.

Title		Episode name	Release date		
Title		Episode name	R2/B	R4/B	R1/A
40th Anniversary Set (Note: Bundle using the same discs as previous releases)		The Dalek Invasion of Earth, Resurrection of the Daleks, Remembrance of the Daleks	October 2003 (Note: W H Smith exclusive)	—N/a	—N/a
The Third Doctor Collection		Spearhead from Space, Inferno, The Claws of Axos, The Three Doctors, Carnival of Monsters, The Green Death	6 November 2006 (Note: Amazon.co.uk exclusive)	—N/a	—N/a
The Davros Collection (Note: Contains the "Special Edition" discs for Remembrance prior to their individual release. The final disc, containing Big Finish audio dramas, is exclusive to this set; "Mission" was originally exclusive to this disc. All other stories use discs from the previous releases.)		Genesis of the Daleks, Destiny of the Daleks, Resurrection of the Daleks, Revelation of the Daleks, Remembrance of the Daleks. Audio: Davros, The Juggernauts, Terror Firma, I, Davros, (Note: All four episodes, plus the "making of" documentary) The Davros Mission	26 November 2007	11 March 2008	16 November 2007
Series 1–4 Box Set		Series 1–4 (including specials)	26 October 2009	—N/a	—N/a
Series 1–6 Giftset (Note: Bundles the seven "Complete Series/Specials" sets and a exclusive bonus disc featuring three BBC America specials. Packaged with a sonic screwdriver toy, a comic and three art cards.)		Series 1–6 (including specials)	—N/a	—N/a	20 November 2012
Regeneration		The Tenth Planet, (Note: Contains animated Episode 4) The War Games, Planet of the Spiders, Logopolis, The Caves of Androzani, Time and the Rani, Doctor Who – The Movie, "Bad Wolf" / "The Parting of the Ways", "The End of Time"	June 2013	September 2013	—N/a
The Doctors Revisited (Note: Contains The Doctors Revisited documentaries, an introduction by showrunner Steven Moffat, an unrestored omnibus edit of the story, as well as the original restored episodic version of the story)	Volume One	The Aztecs, The Tomb of the Cybermen, Spearhead from Space, Pyramids of Mars	—N/a	20 November 2013	16 July 2013
The Doctors Revisited	Volume Two	Earthshock, Vengeance on Varos, Remembrance of the Daleks, Doctor Who – The Movie	—N/a	20 November 2013	1 October 2013
The Doctors Revisited	Volume Three	"Bad Wolf" / "The Parting of the Ways", "The Stolen Earth" / "Journey's End", "The Impossible Astronaut" / "Day of the Moon"	—N/a	20 November 2013	3 December 2013
The Complete Series 1–7		Series 1–7 (including specials) (Note: The North American release uses new discs (encoded in 1080p rather than 1080i) for Series 1-6 and The Complete Specials; it also includes a bonus disc containing the 90-minute version of Doctor Who at the Proms 2010 and two BBC America documentaries (The Brit List's Ultimate Doctor Who List of Lists and The Best of the Christmas Specials), and is bundled with a Sonic Screwdriver toy.)	4 November 2013	—N/a	5 November 2013
The Ten Christmas Specials (Note: Packaged with either a sonic screwdriver toy or TARDIS speaker in North America)		"The Christmas Invasion", "The Runaway Bride", "Voyage of the Damned", "The Next Doctor", "The End of Time", "A Christmas Carol", "The Doctor, the Widow and the Wardrobe", "The Snowmen", "The Time of the Doctor", "Last Christmas"	19 October 2015	—N/a	24 November 2015
The Animation Collection		The Power of the Daleks (animated), Shada (2017), Scream of the Shalka, The Infinite Quest, Dreamland	—N/a	—N/a	4 June 2019
Time Lord Victorious: Road to the Dark Times		Planet of the Daleks, Genesis of the Daleks, The Deadly Assassin, State of Decay, The Curse of Fenric, "The Runaway Bride", "The Waters of Mars"	9 November 2020 ^{(B)}	—N/a	—N/a
Limited Edition New Who Collector's Set		Series 1–13 (including specials)	—N/a	—N/a	21 November 2023 ^{(B)}
Series 1–4		Series 1–4 (including specials)	27 November 2023 ^{(B)}	—N/a	24 October 2024 ^{(B)}

=== Alternative feature-length versions ===
The Curse of Fenric, Battlefield, Enlightenment and Planet of Fire. Some have re-edited feature-length versions on a bonus disc, while others have a reduced edit with additional footage and new special effects, as well as a remixed 5.1 surround soundtrack. The alternative versions of Enlightenment and Planet of Fire are presented in 16:9 widescreen rather than the original 4:3 aspect ratio. The Curse of Fenric and Battlefield are extended edits with new scenes added, while Enlightenment and Planet of Fire are cut down in length to make them more like modern Doctor Who stories. Day of The Daleks featured the original four 25-minute episodes, re-edited, with new CGI, new Dalek voices by Nicholas Briggs and new specially shot scenes filmed at the original locations.

=== Animated stories ===
- Scream of the Shalka is a six-part animated serial which was produced for the 40th Anniversary of the show in 2003. The story featured Richard E. Grant as an alternative version of the Ninth Doctor. When the show returned in 2005, this story was no longer considered part of the BBC's canon. It was aired exclusively on BBCi's website and later through the BBC's red button service. It was released on DVD on 16 September 2013.
- The Infinite Quest is a 13-part animated serial, the first 12 parts of which were originally shown on Totally Doctor Who. Although the serial is not a part of series 3, it features the Doctor and Martha Jones. It was run as a complete 45-minute episode after the series came to an end. It was released on DVD in Region 2 on 12 November 2007, Region 4 on 5 June 2008 and Region 1 on 18 November 2008.
- Dreamland is a six-part animated serial (1 × 12 min., 5 × 6 min.). They were broadcast daily on the BBC's Red Button service from 21 November 2009. It was released on DVD in Region 2 on 1 February 2010 and in Region 1 release on 5 October 2010. Though made in high definition, no Blu-ray is currently planned.

=== DVD releases of theatrical feature films ===
Film remakes based on the first two Dalek television stories were produced in 1965 (Dr. Who and the Daleks) and 1966 (Daleks' Invasion Earth: 2150 A.D.) starring Peter Cushing as "Dr. Who". These two theatrical movies do not take place within the established canon of Doctor Who. The two films have been released as a boxed set (often with the Dalekmania documentary on a separate disc), first in region 4 (9 May 2001), then region 1 (22 November 2001) and later region 2 (29 July 2002). It was also re-released in region 2 (25 September 2006) with a new cover.

== See also ==
- List of other Doctor Who home video releases
- Lists of Doctor Who episodes
- Doctor Who missing episodes
- Doctor Who Restoration Team

== Bibliography ==
- Ainsworth, John, ed. (2015). "100,000 BC and The Mutants (aka The Daleks)". Doctor Who: The Complete History. 1 (4). Panini Comics, Hachette Partworks.
- Ainsworth, John, ed. (2019). "Shada, Dimensions in Time, The Curse of Fatal Death and Time Crash". Doctor Who: The Complete History. 90 (90). London: Panini Comics, Hachette Partworks. ISSN 2057-6048.
- Smith, Paul (2014). The Classic Doctor Who DVD Compendium. United Kingdom: Wonderful Books. ISBN 978-0-9576062-2-7.
