= Lurman =

Lurman may refer to:

- Someone in Carnival of Monsters
- Francis Lurman, a fictional villain
