= Vera Fusek =

British actress (1932–2021)

- Born: Vera Vuseck; 20 May 1932; Prague, Czechoslovakia
- Died: 8 August 2021 (aged 89); Suffolk, England
- Occupation: Actress
- Notable work: Doctor Who: Frontier in Space (1973)

Vera Fusek (née Vuseck, 20 May 1932 – 8 August 2021) was a Czechoslovak-born British actress.

== Life and career ==
Fusek was born in Prague and attended a Swiss finishing school from around 1946. In 1948, her family left Czechoslovakia and settled in Great Britain. After graduating from RADA, she travelled to New York City in 1955 hoping to work on Broadway, but her period in American theatre was brief and she returned to London.

She was known for her work in films such as Treasures of the Snow (1980) and The Great Van Robbery (1959). She also appeared on many TV shows such as the Doctor Who serial Frontier in Space as the Earth's president.

Fusek died in Suffolk, England in August 2021 at the age of 89.
