= RFA Robert Dundas =

History

United Kingdom
- Name: RFA Robert Dundas
- Namesake: Robert Dundas, 2nd Viscount Melville
- Launched: 28 July 1938
- Commissioned: 10 November 1938
- Decommissioned: 8 December 1971
- Fate: Scrapped, 1972

General characteristics
- Class & type: Dundas-class coastal stores carrier
- Displacement: 1,900 long tons (1,930 t)
- Length: 220 ft 6 in (67.21 m)
- Beam: 35 ft 2 in (10.72 m)
- Draught: 13 ft 6 in (4.11 m)
- Propulsion: 1 × 6-cylinder Atlas Polar diesel engine
- Speed: 12 knots (22 km/h; 14 mph)
- Complement: 17

RFA Robert Dundas (A204) was the lead ship of her class of coastal stores carriers of the Royal Fleet Auxiliary. Launched on 28 July 1938, the Robert Dundas was commissioned on 10 November 1938 and served until decommissioned on 8 December 1971. Laid up at Chatham, the ship arrived at Thos. W. Ward Grays, Essex, for scrapping on 3 June 1972.

Whilst in transit from Chatham, the ship was used by the BBC on 1–2 June 1972 as a filming location for the science fiction series Doctor Who. The vessel represented the fictitious SS Bernice in the story Carnival of Monsters.
