= Planet of Evil =

081 – Planet of Evil
- Doctor Who serial

Cast
- Doctor: Tom Baker – Fourth Doctor
- Companion: Elisabeth Sladen – Sarah Jane Smith
- Others: Frederick Jaeger – Sorenson; Ewen Solon – Vishinsky; Prentis Hancock – Salamar; Graham Weston – De Haan; Louis Mahoney – Ponti; Michael Wisher – Morelli; Terence Brook – Braun; Tony McEwan – Baldwin; Haydn Wood – O'Hara; Melvyn Bedford – Reig

Production
- Directed by: David Maloney
- Written by: Louis Marks
- Script editor: Robert Holmes
- Produced by: Philip Hinchcliffe
- Executive producer: None
- Music by: Dudley Simpson
- Production code: 4H
- Series: Season 13
- Running time: 4 episodes, 25 minutes each
- First broadcast: 27 September 1975
- Last broadcast: 18 October 1975

Chronology
← Preceded by Terror of the Zygons	Followed by → Pyramids of Mars

Planet of Evil is the second serial of the 13th season of the British science fiction television series Doctor Who. It was first broadcast in four weekly parts on BBC1 from 27 September to 18 October 1975.

The serial is set on and above the planet Zeta Minor, the last undiscovered planet in the known universe, more than 35,000 years in the future, where the Morestran geologist Sorenson (Frederick Jaeger) seeks to exploit the antimatter minerals on the planet to use as a power source for his own planet. He and the military mission looking for him are attacked by a creature from a universe of anti-matter. The Fourth Doctor and Sarah Jane Smith arrive on the planet in response to a distress call. They find the geological expedition attacked by an unseen killer, leaving only Professor Sorenson alive.

The plot was inspired by the film Forbidden Planet (1956) and the novella Strange Case of Dr Jekyll and Mr Hyde (1886), with a focus on antimatter. The jungle setting was realised at Ealing Studios and shot on film.

== Plot ==
The TARDIS picks up a distress call and the Fourth Doctor and Sarah Jane Smith arrive on the planet Zeta Minor. There they discover that a Morestran geological expedition has fallen prey to an unseen killer and only the leader, Professor Sorenson, remains alive.

A military mission from Morestra has also arrived to investigate. At first they suspect the Doctor and Sarah Jane of responsibility for the deaths of the expedition members, but the culprit is eventually revealed to be a creature from a universe of antimatter, retaliating for the removal by Sorenson of some antimatter samples from around the pit that acts as an interface between the two universes.

The Morestrans take off in their ship, but it is slowly dragged back towards the planet due to the antimatter on board. Sorenson himself becomes infected by antimatter and gradually transforms into an 'antiman', a monster capable of draining the life from others.

The Morestran commander, the increasingly unhinged Salamar, attacks Sorenson with a radiation source, but this only causes him to produce multiple anti-matter versions of Sorenson which soon overrun the ship. The Doctor finds the original Sorenson, takes him back to the planet in the TARDIS and throws both him and his samples into the pit, fulfilling a bargain he earlier made with the anti-matter creature. Sorenson reappears unharmed, and the Doctor returns him to the Morestran ship, which is now freed of the planet's influence.

=== Outside references ===
The Doctor quotes from Romeo and Juliet and Hamlet, and says that he met William Shakespeare once.

== Production ==
The plot was deliberately conceived by Philip Hinchcliffe, Robert Holmes and Louis Marks as a mixture of the film Forbidden Planet (1956) and the novella The Strange Case of Dr Jekyll and Mr Hyde (1886). In addition, Marks had been reading science magazine articles about antimatter, and decided to write a story incorporating the subject. Hinchcliffe, in the first season in which he could commission new material, planned to move away from the "rubber-suited alien" theme, which he felt was clichéd. For this story he proposed having three separate monstrous elements: Sorenson's transformation, the anti-matter monster and finally the planet itself, said by Sorenson in episode one to be conscious of his group's motives.

Despite the jungle setting of this serial, the shoot was entirely studio bound, and designer Roger Murray-Leach built an intricately detailed jungle set at Ealing Studios, which director David Maloney shot on film. The BBC was so impressed with it that they kept photographs of it for several years as an example of excellent set design and producer Philip Hinchcliffe recommended that he be nominated for an award for this work.

The original script had Sorenson dying after falling into the pit, but Hinchcliffe ordered that this be changed, as he felt it would too grim an ending for "the little ones" (i.e. children), and because he saw Sorenson as a victim of the planet's influence rather than an evil man in himself. Instead, a scene was added in which Sorenson is released from the pit and cured of his anti-matter contamination.

The most visible reference to Forbidden Planet is the anti-matter monster (Mike Lee Lane), which is sometimes invisible and otherwise is seen as red outlines. It bears a close resemblance to the film's "Creature from the Id". The monster is invisible in the filmed sections of the serial (where a wind machine was used to show its progress), and as outlines in the video sections (created with Colour Separation Overlay).

=== Cast notes ===
This is the final appearance by Michael Wisher in Doctor Who. Prentis Hancock made his third appearance, having previously appeared in Spearhead from Space (1970) and Planet of the Daleks (1973). He would later appear in The Ribos Operation (1978). Frederick Jaeger (Professor Sorenson) and Ewen Solon (Vishinsky) both previously appeared in The Savages (1966), in which they played Jano and Chal, respectively. Jaeger would later appear in 1977's The Invisible Enemy as Professor Marius, creator of the robot dog K-9. Louis Mahoney (Ponti) had previously appeared in Frontier in Space (1973) and would later appear in "Blink" (2007). Graham Weston (De Haan) had also previously appeared in Patrick Troughton's final serial The War Games (1969).

== Broadcast and reception ==
Episode	Title	Run time	Original release date	UK viewers (millions)
1	"Part One"	24:02	27 September 1975	10.4
2	"Part Two"	22:30	4 October 1975	9.9
3	"Part Three"	23:50	11 October 1975	9.1
4	"Part Four"	23:43	18 October 1975	10.1

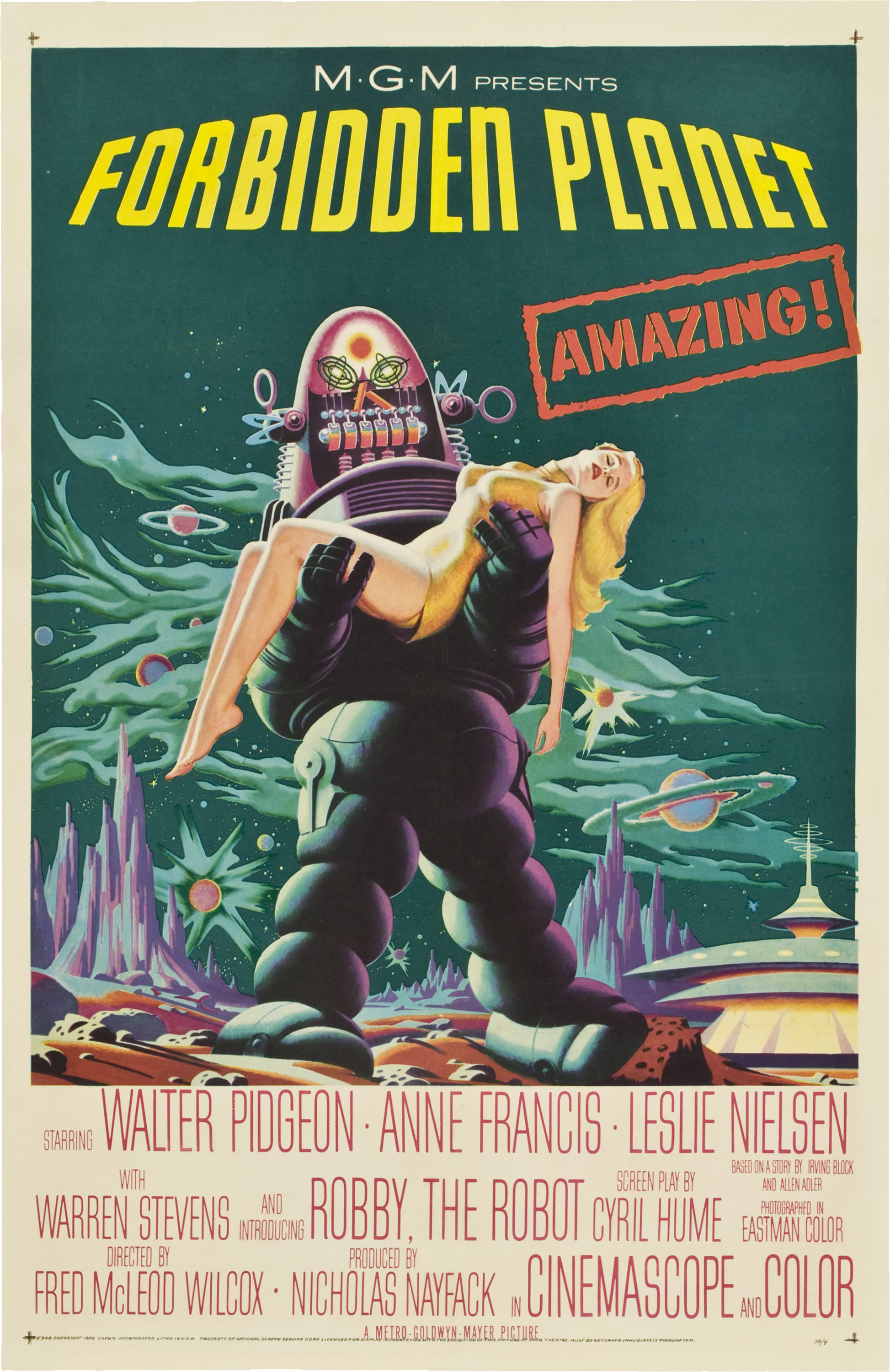
Planet of Evil is considered to have been partly inspired by Forbidden Planet (1956)

The story was repeated across four consecutive evenings on BBC1 from 5–8 July 1976, with a start time varying between 6:20 pm and 6:35 pm. It was the first story since Spearhead from Space to be repeated in its entirety on BBC TV and the first ever to be stripped across consecutive evenings. The viewing figures were 5.0, 5.0, 4.3 & 3.9 million viewers, respectively.

Paul Cornell, Martin Day and Keith Topping wrote of the serial in The Discontinuity Guide (1995), "For an eight-year old, this was the most terrifying slice of Who. Now it seems a little ordinary, a simple reworking of classic themes. It is unfortunate that the detailed jungle set is in such sharp contrast to the (cheap) minimalism of the Morestran spaceship." In The Television Companion (1998), David J. Howe and Stephen James Walker described Planet of Evil as "a wonderfully creepy story" with the borrowing of material from Jekyll and Hyde "done with such style and panache that the viewer, far from complaining about a lack of originality, delights in spotting all the familiar sources to which the writer and the production team are paying homage." They also noted that the antimatter monster, depicted only as a shimmering red outline, was "in all but name, the Id monster from the 1956 MGM feature film Forbidden Planet." Howe and Walker also praised the jungle set and the performances of Frederick Jaeger and Ewen Solon, but criticised Prentis Hancock's "poor" portrayal of Salamar.

Ray Dexter's assessment of Planet of Evil also acknowledged the influence of the 1956 film Forbidden Planet, which inspired the writers to include an invisible, murderous monster, as well as elements of Jekyll and Hyde. Reviewing the serial in 1999, literary critic John Kenneth Muir drew attention to similarities between Planet of Evil and Ridley Scott's 1979 film Alien, in particular the scenario of a spaceship answering a distress call, the crew being gradually killed by a malevolent alien life form, and corpses being ejected into space in metal coffins. Muir hesitated to suggest that Alien was directly influenced by this story, but considered it significant that Doctor Who dealt with science fiction themes that became popular later in the 1970s.

In 2010, Patrick Mulkern of Radio Times awarded the serial four stars out of five and wrote that it "feels original", particularly praising the jungle set and David Maloney's direction, as well as Tom Baker's performance.

== Commercial releases ==
=== In print ===
Doctor Who and The Planet of Evil
- Author: Terrance Dicks
- Cover artist: Mike Little
- Series: Doctor Who book: Target novelisations
- Release number: 47
- Publisher: Target Books
- Publication date: 18 August 1977
- ISBN: 0-426-11682-8

A novelisation of this serial, written by Terrance Dicks, was published by Target Books in July 1977 as Doctor Who and the Planet of Evil.

=== VHS and DVD release ===
Planet of Evil was released on VHS on 7 February 1994 (alongside the Sylvester McCoy story Dragonfire), and on DVD on 15 October 2007. This serial was also released as part of the Doctor Who DVD Files in Issue 94 on 8 August 2012.

== Bibliography ==
- Cornell, Paul; Day, Martin; Topping, Keith (1995). "The Hand of Fear" (reprinted on BBC Doctor Who website). The Discontinuity Guide. London: Virgin Books. pp. 180–182. ISBN 0-426-20442-5.
- Haining, Peter Doctor Who: 25 Glorious Years W H Allen (1988) ISBN 1-85227-021-7
