= The Green Death =

069 – The Green Death
- Doctor Who serial

Cast
- Doctor: Jon Pertwee – Third Doctor
- Companion: Katy Manning – Jo Grant
- Others: Nicholas Courtney – Brigadier Lethbridge-Stewart; Richard Franklin – Captain Mike Yates; John Levene – Sergeant Benton; Stewart Bevan – Professor Clifford Jones; Jerome Willis – Stevens; Mitzi McKenzie – Nancy; Ben Howard – Hinks; John Rolfe – Fell; Tony Adams – Elgin; Roy Skelton – James; John Dearth – Voice of BOSS; Richard Beale – Minister of Ecology; Talfryn Thomas – Dave; Roy Evans – Bert; Mostyn Evans – Dai Evans; John Scott Martin – Hughes; Ray Handy – Milkman; Terry Walsh, Brian Justice (Note: Brian Justice is incorrectly credited onscreen on Episode Four as "Yate's Guard" instead of the grammatically correct "Yates's Guard" as listed in the Radio Times.) – Guards; Jean Burgess – Cleaner

Production
- Directed by: Michael E. Briant
- Written by: Robert Sloman; Barry Letts (uncredited)
- Script editor: Terrance Dicks
- Produced by: Barry Letts
- Executive producer: None
- Music by: Dudley Simpson
- Production code: TTT
- Series: Season 10
- Running time: 6 episodes, 25 minutes each
- First broadcast: 19 May 1973
- Last broadcast: 23 June 1973

Chronology
← Preceded by Planet of the Daleks	Followed by → The Time Warrior

The Green Death is the fifth and final serial of the tenth season of the British science fiction television series Doctor Who, which was first broadcast in six weekly parts on BBC1 from 19 May to 23 June 1973. It was the last regular appearance of Katy Manning as companion Jo Grant.

In the serial, the alien time traveller the Third Doctor (Jon Pertwee) and the organisation UNIT investigate a South Wales mine where waste from an oil plant has killed miners and made maggots grow to giant size.

== Plot ==
Jo, and Brigadier Lethbridge-Stewart investigate the mysterious death of a miner, found glowing bright green, in the abandoned coal mine in Llanfairfach in South Wales. The Doctor, uninterested, visits Metebelis 3 instead, retrieving one of the planet's psionic blue crystals.

Upon arrival, the Brigadier meets with Stevens, director of the nearby Global Chemicals plant. Meanwhile, Jo visits local environmentalist Professor Clifford Jones, who believes Global Chemicals is responsible for the death. Jo then goes down the mineshaft with a miner called Bert to help another man, Dai Evans, who is turning bright green and dying. Bert and Jo set off for an emergency shaft out, while the Doctor, having returned, goes down after them and finds Dai dead. Deeper inside the mine, Jo and Bert find a lake of bright green slime, filled with large maggots. At the top of the natural shaft, they find a large pipe, with the insides covered with traces of oil waste, linking it with Global Chemicals. Bert is infected by the slime and dies that night.

The next morning, the Doctor sneaks into Global Chemicals to find out who is in charge. On the top floor of the complex he discovers the BOSS, a megalomaniacal supercomputer. It runs the company, controls key staff members, including Stevens, and is responsible for the polluting chemical process. Jones discovers the fungus he has been studying as a food source kills the maggots and, thus, can cure the infection, but he is bitten by a maggot and infected before he can tell anyone. Meanwhile, the Doctor comes to the same conclusion as Clifford. He and Sergeant Benton proceed to scatter it to kill them en masse. Later, as Jones nears death, the Doctor realises that injecting extract from the fungus will cure him, saving his life.

The Doctor returns to Global Chemicals to confront the BOSS. The computer plans to link up with others and effect a corporate takeover of the human race. The Doctor breaks Stevens' hypnotic state using the blue crystal, and Stevens, infuriated at what the BOSS has done to him, cross-feeds the generator circuits to trigger an explosion that kills him and destroys BOSS. Jo and Jones announce they are getting married. The Doctor gives his blessing and gives her the blue crystal, but since this means the end of Jo's travels with the Doctor, he quietly slips away from the party.

== Production ==
In the footage of the maggots around the quarry site, several of the maggot props were inflated party balloons; (some inflated with air, others with water). The colliery used for filming was Ogilvie Colliery near Deri, Caerphilly, while Global Chemicals was the RCA International factory in Brynmawr. The script required the Doctor to state that the maggots have "thick chitinous skin". Pertwee asked producer Barry Letts how to pronounce the word, and Letts, unaware of the term, told him to pronounce the first syllable "chit", rather than the more correct "kite". Two days after Episode 4 was broadcast, Letts received a letter consisting simply of the words, "The reason I'm writin'/Is how to say kitin [sic]."

The prime minister is addressed as "Jeremy", which was a production joke referring to the then Liberal Party leader Jeremy Thorpe.

In 2004, Barry Letts said he was unhappy with the colour separation overlay effect used for the cavern scenes in this story.

=== Cast notes ===
Tony Adams, who played Elgin, was taken ill during the recording of The Green Death, and so Roy Skelton was brought in to play a new character called Mr James, who was given the lines written for Elgin. In Global Conspiracy (see 'Home media'), Adams actually uses his real illness as an explanation for his character's sudden absence towards the end of the story.

The part of Professor Clifford Jones was played by Stewart Bevan. Bevan was at the time engaged to Katy Manning. The fictional couple become engaged at the end of the story, whereas Bevan and Manning separated a year after the show was recorded.

Talfryn Thomas, who plays Dave, had previously appeared in Spearhead from Space as Mullins.

John Dearth, who voiced BOSS, later played Lupton in Planet of the Spiders (1974).

== Broadcast and reception ==
Episode	Title	Run time	Original release date	UK viewers (millions)	Archive
1	"Episode One"	25:55	19 May 1973	9.2	PAL 2" colour videotape
2	"Episode Two"	25:56	26 May 1973	7.2	PAL 2" colour videotape
3	"Episode Three"	25:12	2 June 1973	7.8	PAL 2" colour videotape
4	"Episode Four"	25:47	9 June 1973	6.8	PAL 2" colour videotape
5	"Episode Five"	25:20	16 June 1973	8.3	PAL 2" colour videotape
6	"Episode Six"	26:06	23 June 1973	7.0	PAL 2" colour videotape

An edited, condensed omnibus edition of the story was broadcast on BBC1 at 4:00 pm on 27 December 1973, reaching a higher audience than the original episodes, with 10.4 million viewers. A repeat series of all six episodes was shown on BBC2 from 2 January to 6 February 1994, with ratings of 1.3, 1.1, 0.8, 1.1, 1.3 and 1.3 million viewers respectively. BBC Four showed the story in three double-length episodes at 7:10 pm on 3–5 April 2006.

Paul Cornell, Martin Day, and Keith Topping gave the serial a favourable review in The Discontinuity Guide (1995), though they noted that it "patronises the Welsh". In The Television Companion (1998), David J. Howe and Stephen James Walker felt that the story was "nicely set up", although they said that the script resorted to stereotypes with the hippies and the Welshmen. While noting that the story "suffers from an over-reliance on CSO" and that the acting of the Global Chemicals employees failed to impress, they praised the maggots, and Jo's departure. In 2010, Mark Braxton of Radio Times awarded it five stars out of five. He described The Green Death as "entertaining, frightening, poignant and important". He also felt the CSO was "woeful" but the maggots a success, and additionally praised the moral and cultural messages.

In 2012, SFX named Jo's departure as the fourth-greatest companion farewell, noting how it was the first time the Doctor was "truly upset" since leaving Susan. In 2009, they listed the scene where a giant maggot approaches Jo as the eighth-scariest Doctor Who moment. The magazine also listed the scene where the Doctor dresses in drag as one of the silliest moments in Doctor Who's history in a 2010 article. In 2013, Ben Lawrence of The Daily Telegraph named The Green Death as one of the top ten Doctor Who stories set in the contemporary time. In the book Doctor Who: The Episode Guide, Mark Campbell awarded it ten out of ten, describing it as "one of the very best UNIT stories, offering terrifying maggots, horrible green slime and some very scary cliffhangers. There is also real character development and an attempt to address adult themes in an adult way." He also thought Jo's departure was "one of the series' saddest moments."

== Commercial releases ==
=== In print ===
Doctor Who and the Green Death
- Author: Malcolm Hulke
- Cover artist: Peter Brookes
- Series: Doctor Who book: Target novelisations
- Release number: 29
- Publisher: Target Books
- Publication date: 21 August 1975
- ISBN: 0-426-10647-4

A novelisation of this serial, written by Malcolm Hulke, was published by Target Books in August 1975. The company Global Chemicals had to be changed to Panorama Chemicals because a real Global Chemicals was found to exist. Hulke tells the story from several points of view including the possessed Stevens, the psychotic Hinks and even a hungry maggot. The novelisation makes the Doctor's final scene with Jo even more emotional as he sheds a tear after they say their goodbyes as he drives away alone.

An unabridged reading by Katy Manning of the novelisation was released on CD in September 2008 by BBC Audiobooks.

=== Home media ===
The story was released on VHS in October 1996 as a two-tape set. On the back of the VHS box, BBC Video presented this serial's release as a tribute to Jon Pertwee, who had died a few months earlier in May 1996.

The Green Death was released on DVD in the United Kingdom on 10 May 2004. The Green Death featured in issue 48 of Doctor Who DVD Files, published 3 November 2010. A Special Edition DVD of the serial was released in the UK on 5 August 2013 containing extra bonus features including a new 25-minute documentary on the making of the serial called "The One With the Maggots", as well as The Sarah Jane Adventures serial Death of the Doctor, which reunites the Doctor and Jo.

The DVD release of this story features a fictitious documentary, Global Conspiracy, starring Mark Gatiss as investigative reporter Terry Scanlon, following up the events surrounding the incident at Global Chemicals. Several actors from The Green Death briefly reprise their roles, and it is revealed that Stevens and BOSS survived.

The serial was released on Blu-ray as part of "The Collection - Season 10" boxed set in July 2019, featuring special features from the DVD releases, as well as new content created specially for this release.

== See also ==
- "Arachnids in the UK"
