= Fitzroy Park =

Road in Highgate, London

Coordinates: 51.5696°N 0.1559°W

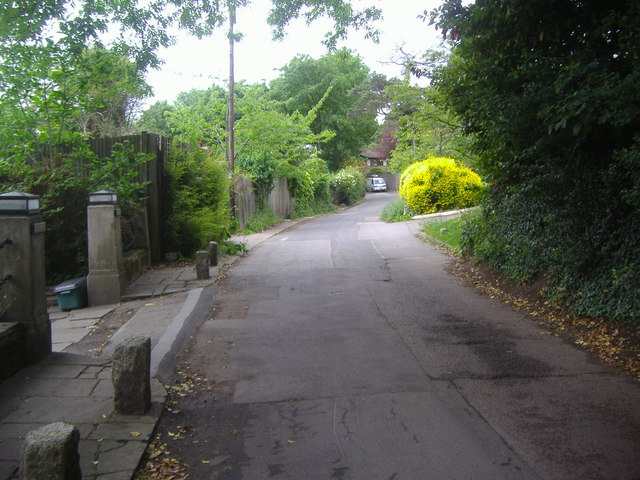
Fitzroy Park in 2008

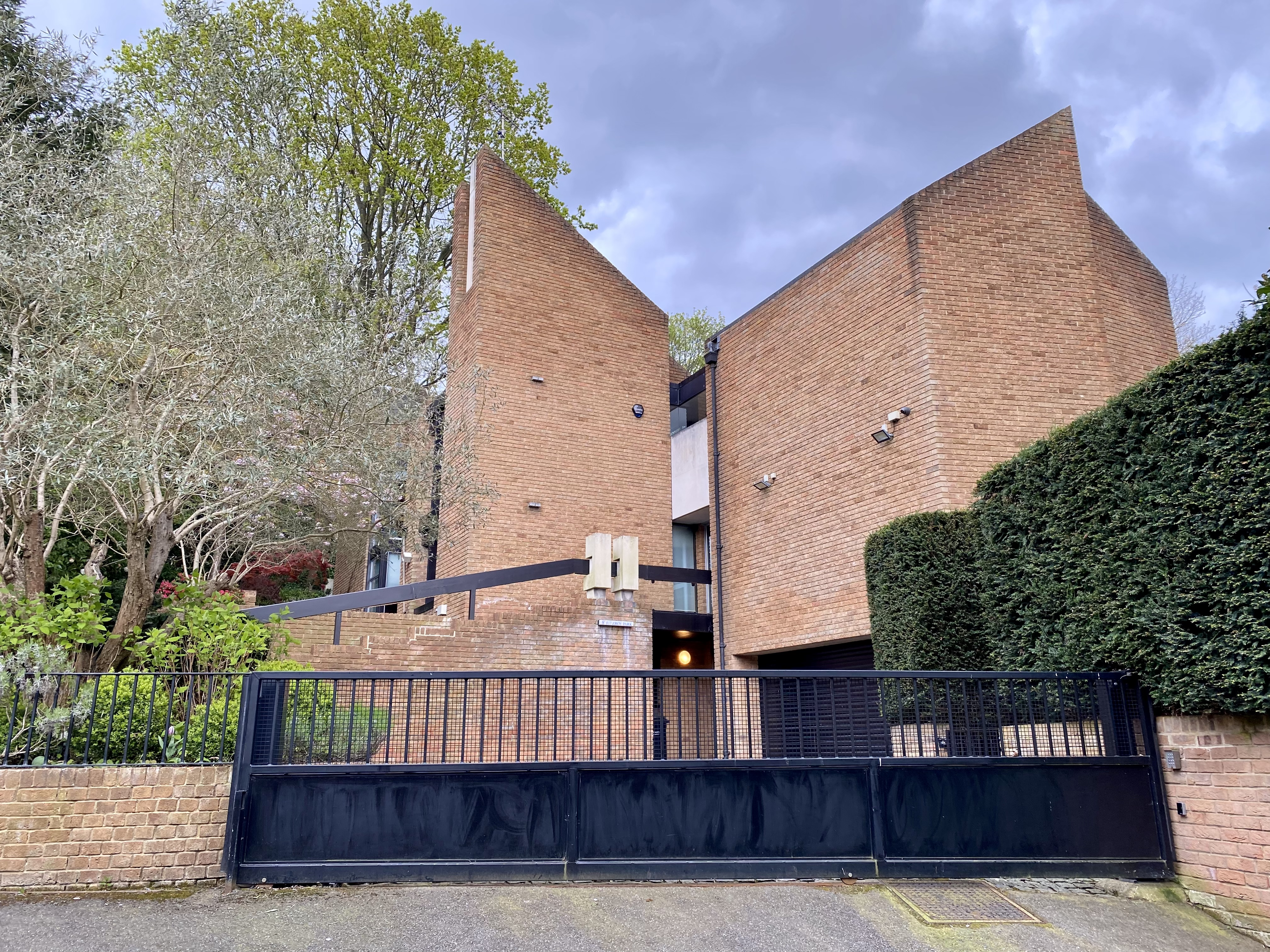
8a Fitzroy Park in 2024

Fitzroy Park is a road in Highgate in the London Borough of Camden. It is entered from The Grove and runs down hill to Millfield Lane. The road originally formed the carriage drive for Fitzroy House. The formerly rural setting of the road was significantly altered during the 20th century by the development of large private residences and high walls.

It is noted for its modernist houses. Nos. 8a and 10 are listed Grade II on the National Heritage List for England. The Hexagon, a gated housing development on Fitzroy Park, was built on the gardens of Witanhurst in the 1960s. A further development of 24 houses was built in 7 acres of the grounds of Witanhurst in 1985. The houses were priced between £750,000 and £1.5 million (equivalent to £5,740,465 in 2023). The site was acquired for £7 million by the Rosehaugh Group.

Fitzroy House on Fitzroy Park was demolished in 1828 having been built in 1770. The grounds of Fitzroy House were reputedly designed by Capability Brown, and extended across the whole of the present site of the modern road.

No. 6 was designed by the Danish architect Erhard Lorenz for the engineer Ove Arup and his family. The Arups moved to the completed house in 1957. Lorenz had originally situated the kitchen of the house facing north, toward a mudbank, but it was moved to overlook the garden after the complaints of Ruth Sørenson (known as "Li"), Arup's wife.

No. 8a was designed by Hal Higgins of Higgins and Neyfor for the engineer Peter Epstein, as Epstein's private house and built between 1965 and 1967. The Historic England heritage listing praises the design of 8a as being " ... entirely of its time" as well as " ... one of the most adventurous in terms of complexity and in its method of separating the different functions of the house". 8a was depicted as the Draconian Embassy in scenes from the 1972 Doctor Who episode Frontier in Space, that were filmed at the house. The architecture critic Colin Amery wrote of 8a in a 1973 article for the Architects' Journal that it was " ... rare to find a house that succeeds as a dramatic piece of architecture and as a home. This house provides an infinite variety of spaces that can accommodate all sorts of uses. To do this it has not adopted some anonymous system, it still makes a strong statement. Imagination, craftsmanship and money have combined to create a most stimulating house". 8a was put up for sale in 2021 for £11.5 million.

No. 10 was designed by the architect E. Vincent Harris as his personal residence and was completed in 1932. In 1953 Harris purchased an adjoining house, Southampton Lodge, which was subsequently demolished to extend his garden to the south west. Upon his death he left the house to the Metropolitan Borough of St Pancras for the benefit of its employees. It was sold by its successor, the London Borough of Camden, in 2001 and it reverted to a private house.

The Elms on Fitzroy Park is also listed Grade II as is its entrance lodge, pedestrian entrance, and garden wall. The Elms was designed by George Basevi and built between 1838 and 1840. It has been subsequently altered.

The average price of a property on Fitzroy Park was estimated at £5.1 million in 2021.

The cardiologist Frances Gardner was a resident of Fitzroy Park at the time of her 1989 death.
