= Planet of the Daleks =

068 – Planet of the Daleks
- Doctor Who serial

Cast
- Doctor: Jon Pertwee – Third Doctor
- Companion: Katy Manning – Jo Grant
- Others: Prentis Hancock – Vaber; Bernard Horsfall – Taron; Tim Preece – Codal; Jane How – Rebec; Hilary Minster – Marat; Alan Tucker – Latep; Roy Skelton – Wester (Note: Also provided other Spiridon voices, uncredited.); Michael Wisher, Roy Skelton – Dalek Voices; John Scott Martin, Murphy Grumbar, Cy Town – Daleks

Production
- Directed by: David Maloney
- Written by: Terry Nation
- Script editor: Terrance Dicks
- Produced by: Barry Letts
- Executive producer: None
- Music by: Dudley Simpson
- Production code: SSS
- Series: Season 10
- Running time: 6 episodes, 25 minutes each
- First broadcast: 7 April 1973
- Last broadcast: 12 May 1973

Chronology
← Preceded by Frontier in Space	Followed by → The Green Death

Planet of the Daleks is the fourth serial of the tenth season of the British science fiction television series Doctor Who, which was first broadcast in six weekly parts on BBC1 from 7 April to 12 May 1973. It was the first Dalek story to be written by their creator Terry Nation since 1965’s The Daleks' Master Plan.

Continuing from the events of the serial Frontier in Space, the story involves a small team of Daleks plotting to revive an army of Daleks which are being kept in suspended animation on the planet Spiridon.

== Plot ==
The Third Doctor has been wounded after being shot by the Master. Jo helps the Doctor into the TARDIS, where he sends a message to the Time Lords before he collapses then falls into a coma. The Time Lords direct the TARDIS to the planet Spiridon, where Jo leaves the TARDIS in an attempt to find help, and encounters a party of Thals, the Daleks' oldest enemy. The Thals rescue the Doctor from the TARDIS, the outside of which has been overtaken by a lethal fungus, and explain to the Doctor that the Daleks have set up a research base on the planet to gain the native Spiridons' power of invisibility.

The Thals take the Doctor back to their ship, but the Daleks arrive first, destroy the ship and capture the Doctor. He presumes Jo to be dead, but fortunately she had already been removed from the ship by a Spiridon named Wester, having become infected with the fungus, which Wester cures. As the Doctor is held captive in the Dalek base, another party of Thals arrives and informs the first group that their intelligence had been mistaken; there isn't just a small research team of Daleks on the planet, but an army of ten thousand, which will form a galactic invasion force.

As the Doctor and a fellow captive Thal break out of their cell, the other Thals break into the base, and the Doctor confirms the existence of the Dalek army, before the group escapes and reunites with Jo and Wester. The Doctor realises that making use of the planet's natural ice volcanos will be key to defeating the Daleks. Meanwhile, a Dalek ship commanded by a Supreme Dalek lands on the planet, and the Supreme executes the lead Dalek for failing to deal with the Doctor and the Thals.

The group sneaks back into the base, where the Daleks are preparing a bacterial weapon in a laboratory chamber to destroy all life on the planet. However, Wester unleashes the weapon prematurely, ensuring he is its only casualty and creating a no-win situation for the Daleks, where those previously inoculated in the laboratory cannot leave or open the chamber, lest they infect their brethren. The Doctor, Jo, and the Thals return to the cavern where the Dalek army is being brought out of stasis, and the Doctor sets off an explosion that floods the entire base with liquid ice, freezing the army. The Thals take the Supreme Dalek's ship to return to their home world of Skaro, where the Doctor advises the returning group to not glamorize their adventure so as to make sure their people do not crave war. The Doctor and Jo narrowly get away in the TARDIS, though the Supreme Dalek vows that they are not defeated, and that they will someday thaw their army back out. The Doctor offers to take Jo anywhere in time and space, but after their recent adventures, Jo is happy to go back to Earth.

== Production ==
The story was originally commissioned as Planet of the Daleks, but during production it briefly changed to Destination: Daleks. Episodes 2 & 4 do not feature a reprise of the previous episode's cliffhanger ending, while the reprises in Episodes 3 and 5 are re-performances. Though this latter technique was commonplace in 1960s episodes, by this time in the programme's history it was an approach almost never used.

The Dalek Supreme in this story was a modified prop from the film Daleks' Invasion Earth 2150 A.D. (1966) that had been given to Terry Nation. Its eyestalk has been replaced with a conventional torch, which flashes when it speaks.

The serial was mostly filmed on studio sets at Ealing Studios and BBC Television Centre in London. Location filming took place for exterior scenes on Spiridon at Beachfields Quarry in Redhill, Surrey (also used in the preceding serial, Frontier in Space).

For many years Episode 3 of the serial existed in the BBC Archives only as a black-and-white 16mm telerecording, as the 625-line colour PAL transmission master videotape for that episode was wiped for reuse by the BBC in 1976. Episode 3 was restored to full colour in 2008, using a combination of computer colourisation by Legend Films with software developed by the Colour Recovery Working Group. This version was released on DVD in 2009. The colour masters for the other five episodes are still extant.

=== Cast notes ===
Bernard Horsfall had previously appeared as Lemuel Gulliver in The Mind Robber (1968) and as the First Time Lord in The War Games (1969). He appeared once more in The Deadly Assassin (1976), as Chancellor Goth. All these serials were directed by David Maloney.

Prentis Hancock had appeared as a reporter in Spearhead from Space (1970), and would return as Salamar in Planet of Evil (1975) and as the Shrieve Captain in The Ribos Operation (1978).

== Broadcast and reception ==
Episode	Title	Run time	Original release date	UK viewers (millions)	Archive
1	"Episode One"	24:51	7 April 1973	11.0	PAL 2" colour videotape
2	"Episode Two"	24:08	14 April 1973	10.7	PAL 2" colour videotape
3	"Episode Three"	22:34	21 April 1973	10.1	Chroma dot colour recovery (2019 remaster)
4	"Episode Four"	23:36	28 April 1973	8.3	PAL 2" colour videotape
5	"Episode Five"	22:31	5 May 1973	9.7	PAL 2" colour videotape
6	"Episode Six"	23:02	12 May 1973	8.5	PAL 2" colour videotape

The serial was repeated on BBC One on Friday evenings between 5 November and 17 December 1993, as part of "Doctor Who and the Daleks", celebrating 30 years of Doctor Who. Each episode was preceded by a specially made 5 min vignette, which were 'Bigger on the Inside', 'The Antique Doctor Who Roadshow', 'Missing in Action', 'I Was That Monster', 'The Master' and 'U.N.I.T. Recruitment Film'. The repeat of Episode 3 of Planet of the Daleks on 19 November 1993 was shown in black and white, the only time since June 1969 that a Doctor Who episode has been broadcast in black and white on BBC One. The ratings achieved were 3.6, 4.0, 3.9, 3.3, 3.3 and 3.5 million viewers, respectively.

Paul Cornell, Martin Day, and Keith Topping gave an unfavourable review of the serial in The Discontinuity Guide (1995), writing that it was "a typical coincidence-based Dalek story of hammy deaths and ridiculous escapes. A reworking of the themes and set pieces of The Daleks, with pacifism and an anti-nuclear stance becoming weak monologues on bravery and caution." In 2010, Mark Braxton of Radio Times awarded it three stars out of five, describing Planet of the Daleks as "an exciting story, but a tawdry spectacle" with it being "continually compromised" in production values. While he found that some elements of the story were enjoyable, he felt that it lacked emotional continuity and the Daleks did not impress. DVD Talk's John Sinnott found the story more enjoyable than Frontier in Space, praising the way Nation "filled the plot with creative other-worldly creatures and devices and used them nicely to move the story". In the book Doctor Who: The Episode Guide, Mark Campbell also rated it as better than Frontier in Space, awarding it eight out of ten, concluding "a believable jungle setting and ambitious (if unoriginal) ideas make this live-action comic strip romp breeze along in fine style."

== Commercial releases ==
=== In print ===
Doctor Who and the Planet of the Daleks
- Author: Terrance Dicks
- Cover artist: Chris Achilleos
- Series: Doctor Who book: Target novelisations
- Release number: 46
- Publisher: Target Books
- Publication date: 21 October 1976
- ISBN: 0-426-11252-0

A novelisation of this serial, written by Terrance Dicks, was published by Target Books in October 1976. The novelisation opens with the cliffhanger from Frontier in Space of a comatose Doctor pursuing the Daleks through space, even though this was removed from the Space War novelisation. A German translation was published in 1980.

In 1995 an abridged version of the novel was issued by BBC Audio as an audio book, read by Jon Pertwee. It was later reissued on the MP3-CD release Tales from the TARDIS Volume 2. An unedited audio book version was released in June 2013, narrated by actor and writer Mark Gatiss, with Dalek voices performed by Nicholas Briggs.

=== Home media ===
This story, together with Revelation of the Daleks was released on VHS in a special Dalek tin set in 1999, with episode 3 in black and white. The stories were released on VHS individually in North America. It was released on DVD alongside the previous story, Frontier in Space, in the box set "Dalek War" on 5 October 2009, with episode 3 now restored to full colour using the pioneering chroma dot recovery process and some more traditional colourisation techniques. In July 2019 the story was released for the first time on Blu-ray as part of the Season 10 boxset. For the Blu-ray release episode 3 was newly restored using chroma dot recovery only, as advances through the years allowed a greater restoration than in 2009, no manual colourisation was used for this new remaster. The Blu-ray version featured optional updated visual effects and 5.1 Surround Sound. In November 2020, it was released as part of the Time Lord Victorious: Road to the Dark Times blu-ray set along with Genesis of the Daleks, The Deadly Assassin. State of Decay, The Curse of Fenric, The Runaway Bride and The Waters of Mars.
