= Doctor Who season 10 =

1972–73 season of British sci-fi TV series

Doctor Who
- Season 10
- Cover art of the Blu-ray release for the complete season
- Starring: Jon Pertwee; Katy Manning; Nicholas Courtney; John Levene; Richard Franklin; Patrick Troughton; William Hartnell
- No. of stories: 5
- No. of episodes: 26

Release
- Original network: BBC1
- Original release: 30 December 1972 – 23 June 1973

Season chronology
- ← Previous; Season 9 Next → Season 11

The tenth season of British science fiction television series Doctor Who began on 30 December 1972 with the tenth anniversary special The Three Doctors, and ended with Katy Manning's final serial The Green Death. This is the Third Doctor's (played by Jon Pertwee) fourth series, as well as fourth for producer Barry Letts and script editor Terrance Dicks.

== Casting ==
=== Main cast ===
- Jon Pertwee as the Third Doctor
- Katy Manning as Jo Grant

Jon Pertwee continues his role as the Third Doctor, and Jo Grant played by Katy Manning makes her final regular appearance in The Green Death.

=== Recurring and guest cast ===
- Nicholas Courtney as Brigadier Lethbridge-Stewart
- John Levene as Sergeant Benton
- Richard Franklin as Mike Yates
- Roger Delgado as The Master
- Patrick Troughton as the Second Doctor
- William Hartnell as the First Doctor

Nicholas Courtney, John Levene and Richard Franklin continue their recurring roles of UNIT personnel Brigadier Lethbridge-Stewart, Sergeant Benton and Captain Mike Yates respectively.

Previous lead actors William Hartnell and Patrick Troughton return to guest as the First and Second Doctors in the programme's tenth anniversary serial, The Three Doctors, although illness limited Hartnell's involvement. This was the first time that previous incarnations of the Doctor had returned to the programme, in what would become a regular feature of anniversary episodes.

Roger Delgado makes his final appearance as The Master in Frontier in Space. He died in a car crash in Turkey shortly after the story's transmission.

== Serials ==
At the conclusion of The Three Doctors, the Doctor is finally released from his sentence of exile by the Time Lords, enabling him to travel through time and space once again. This ends the cycle of mostly Earth-bound stories where the Doctor was stranded that began at the conclusion of The War Games in 1969.

The serials Frontier in Space and Planet of the Daleks both feature the Daleks and lead directly from the first into the second, forming a rough twelve-part epic.

The story Multiface by Godfrey Harrison was scrapped from this season.

No. story	No. in season	Serial title	Episode titles	Directed by	Written by	Original release date	Prod. code	UK viewers (millions)	AI
65	1	The Three Doctors	"Episode One"	Lennie Mayne	Bob Baker and Dave Martin	30 December 1972	RRR	9.6	—
65	1	The Three Doctors	"Episode Two"	Lennie Mayne	Bob Baker and Dave Martin	6 January 1973	RRR	10.8	—
65	1	The Three Doctors	"Episode Three"	Lennie Mayne	Bob Baker and Dave Martin	13 January 1973	RRR	8.8	—
65	1	The Three Doctors	"Episode Four"	Lennie Mayne	Bob Baker and Dave Martin	20 January 1973	RRR	11.9	—
When Omega, a pioneer of Time Lord civilisation trapped in another universe, starts ripping our universe apart, the Time Lords enlist the help of the Doctor – all 3 incarnations of him.
66	2	Carnival of Monsters	"Episode One"	Barry Letts	Robert Holmes	27 January 1973	PPP	9.5	—
66	2	Carnival of Monsters	"Episode Two"	Barry Letts	Robert Holmes	3 February 1973	PPP	9.0	—
66	2	Carnival of Monsters	"Episode Three"	Barry Letts	Robert Holmes	10 February 1973	PPP	9.0	—
66	2	Carnival of Monsters	"Episode Four"	Barry Letts	Robert Holmes	17 February 1973	PPP	9.2	—
The Doctor and Jo are trapped in a miniscope, a peepshow device for displaying humans and other life-forms for entertainment.
67	3	Frontier in Space	"Episode One"	Paul Bernard	Malcolm Hulke	24 February 1973	QQQ	9.1	—
67	3	Frontier in Space	"Episode Two"	Paul Bernard	Malcolm Hulke	3 March 1973	QQQ	7.8	—
67	3	Frontier in Space	"Episode Three"	Paul Bernard	Malcolm Hulke	10 March 1973	QQQ	7.5	—
67	3	Frontier in Space	"Episode Four"	Paul Bernard	Malcolm Hulke	17 March 1973	QQQ	7.1	—
67	3	Frontier in Space	"Episode Five"	Paul Bernard	Malcolm Hulke	24 March 1973	QQQ	7.7	—
67	3	Frontier in Space	"Episode Six"	Paul Bernard	Malcolm Hulke	31 March 1973	QQQ	8.9	—
Materialising on an Earth cargo spaceship, the Doctor is caught up in the tensions between the Earth and Draconian Empires.
68	4	Planet of the Daleks	"Episode One"	David Maloney	Terry Nation	7 April 1973	SSS	11.0	—
68	4	Planet of the Daleks	"Episode Two"	David Maloney	Terry Nation	14 April 1973	SSS	10.7	—
68	4	Planet of the Daleks	"Episode Three"	David Maloney	Terry Nation	21 April 1973	SSS	10.1	—
68	4	Planet of the Daleks	"Episode Four"	David Maloney	Terry Nation	28 April 1973	SSS	8.3	—
68	4	Planet of the Daleks	"Episode Five"	David Maloney	Terry Nation	5 May 1973	SSS	9.7	—
68	4	Planet of the Daleks	"Episode Six"	David Maloney	Terry Nation	12 May 1973	SSS	8.5	—
The Time Lords have landed the TARDIS on the planet Spiridon, where the Daleks are awakening the biggest Dalek army the galaxy has ever seen.
69	5	The Green Death	"Episode One"	Michael E. Briant	Robert Sloman and Barry Letts (uncredited)	19 May 1973	TTT	9.2	—
69	5	The Green Death	"Episode Two"	Michael E. Briant	Robert Sloman and Barry Letts (uncredited)	26 May 1973	TTT	7.2	—
69	5	The Green Death	"Episode Three"	Michael E. Briant	Robert Sloman and Barry Letts (uncredited)	2 June 1973	TTT	7.8	—
69	5	The Green Death	"Episode Four"	Michael E. Briant	Robert Sloman and Barry Letts (uncredited)	9 June 1973	TTT	6.8	—
69	5	The Green Death	"Episode Five"	Michael E. Briant	Robert Sloman and Barry Letts (uncredited)	16 June 1973	TTT	8.3	—
69	5	The Green Death	"Episode Six"	Michael E. Briant	Robert Sloman and Barry Letts (uncredited)	23 June 1973	TTT	7.0	—
Waste produced by an oil company causes mutated giant maggots to appear in South Wales.

== Broadcast ==
The entire season was broadcast from 30 December 1972 to 23 June 1973.

== Home media ==
=== VHS releases ===
Season	Story no.	Serial name	Duration	Release date		
Season	Story no.	Serial name	Duration	UK	Australia	USA / Canada
10	65	The Three Doctors	4 × 25 min.	August 1991 (Original); September 2002 (Re-release as part of The Time Lord Collection X4 VHS)	September 1992 Original); April 2003 (Re-release as part of The Time Lord Collection X3 VHS)	January 1992
10	66	Carnival of Monsters	4 × 25 min.	April 1995	May 1995	March 1996
10	67	The Pertwee Years; Frontier in Space (Note: Episode 6)	1 × 25 min.	March 1992	October 1992	October 1992
10	67	Frontier in Space	6 × 25 min.	August 1995 (2 × VHS)	November 1995	March 1996 (2 × VHS)
10	68	Planet of the Daleks	6 × 25 min.	November 1999 (2 × VHS)	December 1999	November 2000 (2 × VHS)
10	69	The Green Death	6 × 25 min.	October 1996 (2 × VHS)	April 1997	February 1997 (2 × VHS)

=== DVD and Blu-ray releases ===
All releases are for DVD unless otherwise indicated:

- ^{(B)} indicates a Blu-ray release

Season	Story no.	Serial name	Duration	Release date		
Season	Story no.	Serial name	Duration	R2	R4	R1
10	65	The Three Doctors	4 × 25 min.	24 November 2003	12 November 2003	2 March 2004
10	65	The Three Doctors (Special Edition) (Note: Only available as part of the Revisitations 3 box set in Regions 2 and 4. Only available individually in Region 1.)	4 × 25 min.	13 February 2012	1 March 2012	13 March 2012
10	66	Carnival of Monsters	4 × 25 min.	15 July 2002	29 August 2002	1 July 2003
10	66	Carnival of Monsters (Special Edition) (Note: Only available as part of the Revisitations 2 box set in Regions 2 and 4. Only available individually in Region 1.)	4 × 25 min.	28 March 2011	5 May 2011	10 April 2012
10	67–68	Frontier in Space; Planet of the Daleks (Note: Double release known collectively as the Dalek War box set. Each serial has six episodes each.)	12 × 25 min.	5 October 2009	4 February 2010	2 March 2010
10	69	The Green Death	6 × 25 min.	10 May 2004	5 August 2004	1 March 2005
10	69	The Green Death (Special Edition) (Note: Also includes The Sarah Jane Adventures serial Death of the Doctor)	6 × 25 min.	5 August 2013	7 August 2013	13 August 2013
10	65–69	Complete Season 10 (Note: Released as Doctor Who: The Collection – Season 10 in Region B. Released as Doctor Who – Jon Pertwee: Complete Season Four in Region A.)	26 × 25 min. 1 × 150 min.	8 July 2019 ^{(B)}	13 November 2019 ^{(B)}	15 October 2019 ^{(B)}

== In print ==
Season	Story no.	Library no. (Note: Number in Target's Doctor Who Library, if applicable)	Novelisation title	Author	Hardcover release date (Note: Published by Target's parent companies (Allen Wingate, W. H. Allen, BBC Books) unless otherwise indicated)	Paperback release date (Note: Published by Target Books (or by BBC Books under the Target Collection umbrella) unless otherwise indicated)	Audiobook	
Season	Story no.	Library no.	Novelisation title	Author	Hardcover release date	Paperback release date	Release date (Note: Unabridged from BBC Audio / AudioGo unless otherwise indicated)	Narrator
10	065	64	The Three Doctors (Note: The 1976 edition (and subsequent reprintings until 1991) is titled Doctor Who and the Three Doctors on the front cover.)	Terrance Dicks	20 November 1975		1978 (Note: Published by the Royal National Institute of the Blind)	Gabriel Woolf
10	065	64	The Three Doctors	Terrance Dicks	20 November 1975		7 April 2010	Katy Manning
10	066	8	Doctor Who and the Carnival of Monsters	Terrance Dicks	20 January 1977		1978	Gabriel Woolf
10	066	8	Doctor Who and the Carnival of Monsters	Terrance Dicks	20 January 1977		13 November 2014	Katy Manning
10	067	57	Doctor Who and the Space War	Malcolm Hulke	23 September 1976		4 February 2008	Geoffrey Beevers
10	068	46	Doctor Who and the Planet of the Daleks	Terrance Dicks	21 October 1976 (Note: An abridged version was first published in Doctor Who and the Daleks Omnibus in September 1976)		5 June 1995	Jon Pertwee
10	068	46	Doctor Who and the Planet of the Daleks	Terrance Dicks	21 October 1976		6 June 2013	Mark Gatiss (Note: Dalek voices performed by Nicholas Briggs)
10	069	29	Doctor Who and the Green Death	Malcolm Hulke	16 April 1981	21 August 1975	4 September 2008	Katy Manning

== Bibliography ==
- Smith, Paul (2014). The Classic Doctor Who DVD Compendium. United Kingdom: Wonderful Books. ISBN 978-0-9576062-2-7.
- Smith, Paul MC (July 2021). Based on the Popular BBC Television Serial. Wonderful Books.
- Howe, David J.; Stammers, Mark; Walker, Stephen James (1994). Doctor Who – The Seventies. London: Virgin Press. ISBN 1-85227-444-1..
