= Frontier in Space =

067 – Frontier in Space
- Doctor Who serial

Cast
- Doctor: Jon Pertwee – Third Doctor
- Companion: Katy Manning – Jo Grant
- Others: Roger Delgado – The Master; Vera Fusek – President; Michael Hawkins – General Williams; Ramsay Williams – Congressman Brook; John Woodnutt – Draconian Emperor; Peter Birrel – Draconian Prince; Lawrence Davidson – Draconian First Secretary (uncredited) (Note: A caption slide from the end credits of Episode One was reused accidentally for Episode Two. This resulted in Lawrence Davison (Draconian First Secretary) and Timothy Craven (Cell Guard) not being credited on-screen, though they were billed in Radio Times, and Louis Mahoney (Newscaster) and Roy Pattison (Draconian Space Pilot) – both of whom appeared only in Episode One – being repeated.); Roy Pattison – Draconian Space Pilot; Bill Wilde – Draconian Captain; Ian Frost – Draconian Messenger; Ray Lonnen – Gardiner; Barry Ashton – Kemp; John Rees – Hardy; James Culliford – Stewart; Harold Goldblatt – Professor Dale; Dennis Bowen – Prison Governor; Madhav Sharma – Patel; Richard Shaw – Cross; Luan Peters – Sheila; Louis Mahoney, Bill Mitchell – Newscasters; Karol Hagar – Secretary; Timothy Craven – Cell Guard (uncredited); Laurence Harrington – Lunar Guard; Clifford Elkin – Earth Cruiser Captain; Stanley Price – Pilot of Space Ship; Caroline Hunt – Technician; Rick Lester, Michael Kilgarriff, Stephen Thorne – Ogrons; Michael Wisher – Dalek Voice; John Scott Martin, Murphy Grumbar, Cy Town – Daleks

Production
- Directed by: Paul Bernard
- Written by: Malcolm Hulke
- Script editor: Terrance Dicks
- Produced by: Barry Letts
- Executive producer: None
- Music by: Dudley Simpson
- Production code: QQQ
- Series: Season 10
- Running time: 6 episodes, 25 minutes each
- First broadcast: 24 February 1973
- Last broadcast: 31 March 1973

Chronology
← Preceded by Carnival of Monsters	Followed by → Planet of the Daleks

Frontier in Space is the third serial of the tenth season of the British science fiction television series Doctor Who. The serial was first broadcast in six weekly parts on BBC1 from 24 February to 31 March 1973. It was the last serial to feature Roger Delgado as the Master.

The serial is set on Earth, the Moon, Draconia, and the home planet of the Ogrons in the 26th century. In the serial, the Daleks employ the Master to provoke a war between the human and Draconian galactic empires.

== Plot ==
The Doctor and Jo arrive on an Earth cargo ship in the 26th century. The Empire of Earth is on the verge of war with the Draconian Empire, with both sides claiming the other is raiding their cargo ships. The ship is attacked by the Ogrons, who previously worked for the Daleks. They steal the cargo from the ship and the TARDIS. The Doctor and Jo are blamed by the crew of the ship, and are taken into interrogation. Rescue attempts of the two by the Draconians and Ogrons fail, before the Doctor is sent to a prison on the Moon without Jo.

Diplomatic relations break down, and the Draconian Ambassador is ordered back to Draconia to report to his father, the Emperor. Meanwhile, an Earth representative arrives to take Jo into custody. The representative is unveiled as the Master, who is controlling the Ogrons with a device that amplifies the fear centres of the mind. The Doctor is also transferred to the custody of the Master, who intends to bring them to the Ogron planet. A Draconian ship intercepts them, and brings them to Draconia and their Emperor, where the Master's plot has been exposed due to a failed rescue attempt by the Ogrons, which leaves one behind.

The Draconian Ambassador, Jo and the Doctor intend to reveal the Ogron to the President of Earth, but the Master rescues the Ogron, and abducts Jo after an Earth ship arrests the Doctor and Ambassador. They suggest an expedition to the Ogron planet to the President for proof and are sent alongside a human crew.

Resisting the Master's fear device, Jo sends a distress signal that the expedition follows to the Ogron planet. The Ogrons and the Master are revealed to be working with the Daleks, who are inciting the war to help conquer the galaxy. The Doctor helps the humans and Draconians to escape the Orgon planet to inform their respective empires.

Jo leads the Doctor to where the Master has kept the TARDIS, but he and the Ogrons hold them at gunpoint. The Doctor uses the fear device to cause a shootout between the Master and Ogrons to create an opening to escape, though the Doctor is injured in the scuffle. Jo helps the barely conscious Doctor into the TARDIS. He de-materialises the ship using the telepathic circuits, sending a message to the Time Lords, to follow the Daleks.

== Production ==
The titles for Frontier in Space were prepared, alongside the previous serial, Carnival of Monsters, with a new arrangement of the theme music performed by Paddy Kingsland on a synthesiser. Known as the "Delaware" arrangement (the BBC Radiophonic Workshop was based on Delaware Road in west London), it proved unpopular with BBC executives, so the original Delia Derbyshire theme was restored, although an early edit of episode 5 still contains the "Delaware" music and was used for the VHS release. This early edit of episode 5 with the Delaware theme featured a longer reprise at the beginning of the episode compared to the broadcast version of episode 5.

The 3 Daleks which appear in the final episode were the same props which had been used in Day of the Daleks.

The final sequence in the Master's headquarters was intended to contain the giant Ogron-eating monster, but director Paul Bernard did not like the costume and omitted it, leaving the scene with just frightened Ogrons running away from something unseen. Producer Barry Letts and script editor Terrance Dicks felt the sequence lacked impact and a new ending was filmed in the TARDIS as part of the first production block of the following story, Planet of the Daleks. Frontier in Space was Paul Bernard's last Doctor Who work.

Location filming took place in London for exterior scenes on 26th-century Earth, with the Hayward Gallery on the South Bank serving as the prison complex and the modernist house at 8a Fitzroy Park in Highgate as the exterior of the Draconian Embassy. Scenes on the Ogron planet were filmes at Beachfields Quarry in Redhill, Surrey.

Jon Pertwee considered the Draconians to be his favourite monster as the rubber and latex masks used allowed the actors playing them to employ a full range of facial expressions. Recalling the production of this story he noted that filming near the Hayward Gallery at the South Bank was made difficult due to a number of "homeless people and drunks" lying around the area. According to Pertwee, Paul Bernard asked the stuntmen and actors who were on location in costume as Ogrons to ask these people to move to allow filming to proceed.

Due to the BBC's policy of wiping preexisting videotapes, episodes 1, 2, 3 & 6 were lost from the BBC's archives. In 1983, 625-line 2-inch PAL copies were returned from ABC Television in Australia.

Filming locations for Frontier in Space

The Hayward Gallery, London (Earth prison complex)

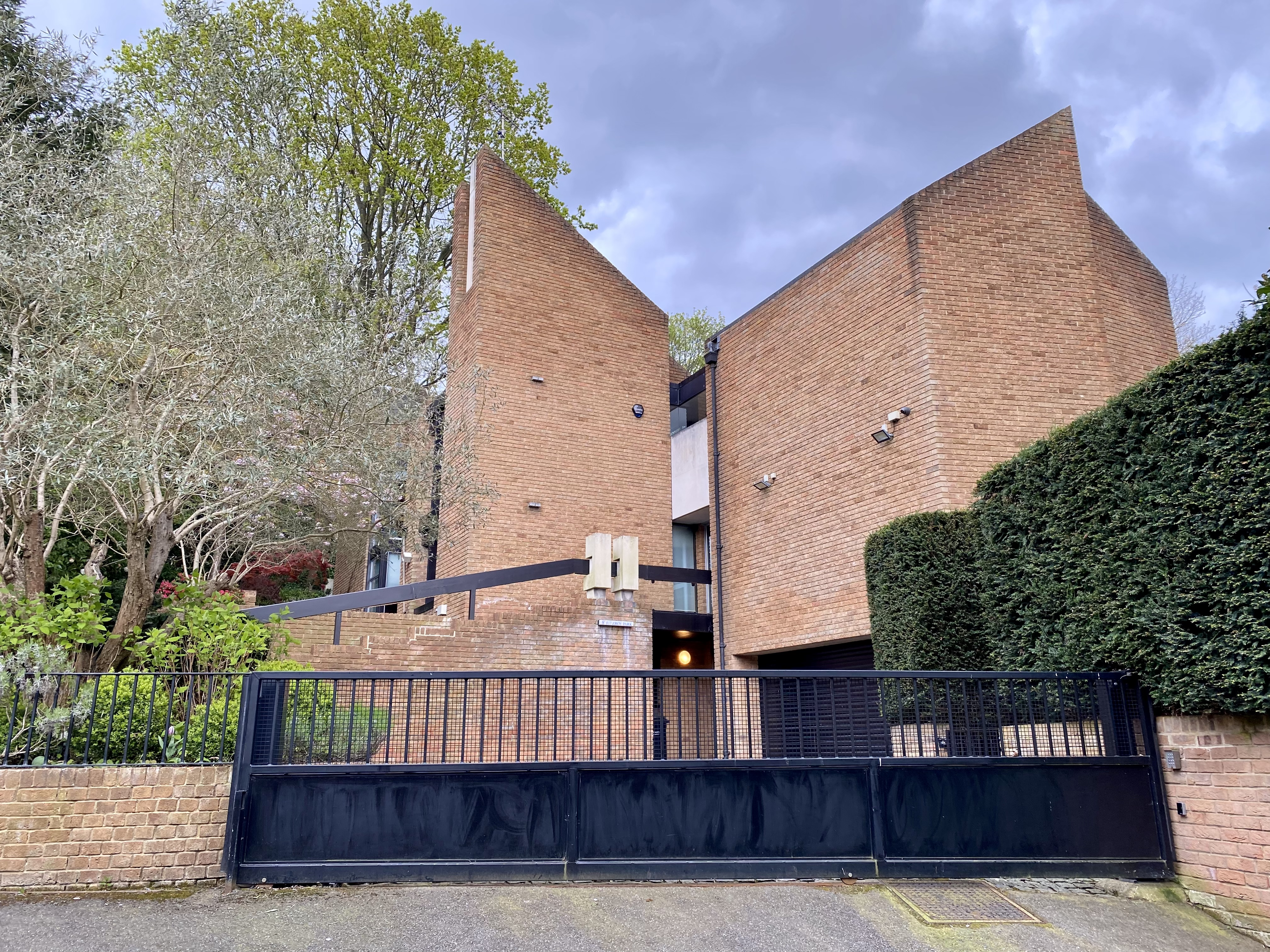
8a Fitzroy Park in Highgate (Draconian Embassy)

=== Cast notes ===
Frontier in Space is the last appearance of Roger Delgado as the Master, his final scene being the confusion outside the TARDIS with his shooting the Doctor, perhaps accidentally, then disappearing with the panicking Ogrons. Roger Delgado was killed in a car crash in Turkey less than three months after this episode's UK broadcast.

John Woodnutt had previously played Hibbert in Spearhead from Space (1970) and would later play the dual roles of Broton and the Duke of Forgill in Terror of the Zygons (1975) as well as Seron in The Keeper of Traken (1981). Luan Peters had previously appeared in The Macra Terror (1967) under her stage name Karol Keyes. Caroline Hunt previously appeared in The Reign of Terror (1964). Louis Mahoney later appeared as Ponti in Planet of Evil (1975) and as Billy Shipton in Blink (2007).

Harold Goldblatt had previously appeared with Jon Pertwee in a 1938 radio production in Belfast entitled Lillibullero, which was one of Pertwee's earliest radio performances.

== Broadcast and reception ==
Episode	Title	Run time	Original release date	UK viewers (millions)	Archive
1	"Episode One"	23:27	24 February 1973	9.1	PAL 2" colour videotape
2	"Episode Two"	24:10	3 March 1973	7.8	PAL 2" colour videotape
3	"Episode Three"	24:00	10 March 1973	7.5	PAL 2" colour videotape
4	"Episode Four"	23:35	17 March 1973	7.1	PAL 2" colour videotape
5	"Episode Five"	23:57	24 March 1973	7.7	PAL 2" colour videotape
6	"Episode Six"	24:44	31 March 1973	8.9	PAL 2" colour videotape

According to the BBC's Audience Research Report, Frontier in Space was well received by viewers at the time of broadcast. Paul Cornell, Martin Day, and Keith Topping wrote of the serial in The Discontinuity Guide (1995), "Worthy, very well directed and designed to the hilt with a solid costuming policy for both empires. However, it's obviously padded in parts." In The Television Companion (1998), David J. Howe and Stephen James Walker stated that the story worked "brilliantly", with the production design "[putting] the whole thing on a suitably grand scale".

In 2010, Patrick Mulkern of Radio Times awarded it four stars out of five and recalled that it was "surprising and exciting" on first viewing, though in retrospect it seemed to be "a lumbering wannabe-epic with screeds of padding, duff cliffhangers and endless scenes of the Doctor and Jo banged up". He praised the Draconians and Ogrons, but felt that "the fact that the heroes spend perhaps two-thirds of the story locked up is tiresome and cannot be overlooked". DVD Talk's John Sinnott noted that the story was "talky" and had a lot of padding, but that it got "much better" when the Master was revealed. In the book Doctor Who: The Episode Guide, Mark Campbell awarded it four out of ten, describing it as "an overlong and uninteresting space opera—a genre Doctor Who has never done well. Delgado's exit is particularly badly handled."

Peter Capaldi, who played the Twelfth Doctor, has said it is one of his favourite serials of the classic seasons.

== Commercial releases ==
=== In print ===
Doctor Who and the Space War
- Author: Malcolm Hulke
- Cover artist: Chris Achilleos
- Series: Doctor Who book: Target novelisations
- Release number: 57
- Publisher: Target Books
- Publication date: 23 September 1976
- ISBN: 0-426-11033-1

A novelisation of this serial, written by Malcolm Hulke, was published by Target Books in September 1976 under the title Doctor Who and the Space War. This was the last time Target would give a novelisation a substantially different title than that of the serial on which it was based. The novel abandons the cliffhanger ending of the televised program and has the Doctor simply leaving the Master on the Ogron world to pursue the Daleks. An unabridged reading of the novelisation by actor Geoffrey Beevers was released on CD in February 2008 by BBC Audiobooks.

=== Home media ===
The story was released on VHS in August 1995. Episode 5 uses the "Delaware" music mentioned above. The final episode of this story was also issued on The Pertwee Years VHS release, along with the final episodes of both Inferno (1970) and The Dæmons (1971). The serial was released on DVD on 5 October 2009 as part of the box set "Dalek War", alongside Planet of the Daleks. It was released on Blu-ray as part of "The Collection - Season 10" boxed set in July 2019.
