= Carnival of Monsters =

066 – Carnival of Monsters
- Doctor Who serial

Cast
- Doctor: Jon Pertwee – Third Doctor
- Companion: Katy Manning – Jo Grant
- Others: Michael Wisher – Kalik; Terence Lodge – Orum; Peter Halliday – Pletrac; Leslie Dwyer – Vorg; Cheryl Hall – Shirna; Tenniel Evans – Major Daly; Jenny McCracken – Claire Daly; Ian Marter – John Andrews; Andrew Staines – Captain

Production
- Directed by: Barry Letts
- Written by: Robert Holmes
- Script editor: Terrance Dicks
- Produced by: Barry Letts
- Music by: Dudley Simpson
- Production code: PPP
- Series: Season 10
- Running time: 4 episodes, 25 minutes each
- First broadcast: 27 January 1973
- Last broadcast: 17 February 1973

Chronology
← Preceded by The Three Doctors	Followed by → Frontier in Space

Carnival of Monsters is the second serial of the tenth season of the British science fiction television series Doctor Who, which was first broadcast in four weekly parts on BBC1 from 27 January to 17 February 1973.

In the serial, set on the planet Inter Minor, the alien time traveller known as "The Doctor" (in his third incarnation, played by Jon Pertwee) and his travelling companion Jo Grant (Katy Manning) are trapped inside a miniscope, a device used by the showman Vorg (Leslie Dwyer) to shrink life forms and put them on display for entertainment.

It is the first serial since The War Games (1969) in which the Doctor is allowed to pilot the TARDIS completely under his own control.

== Plot ==
The TARDIS misses Metebelis Three and materialises in 1926 on the SS Bernice, a ship that suddenly disappeared while travelling the Indian Ocean. Being repeatedly arrested as stowaways, the Third Doctor and Jo find out that ship's occupants keep repeating their actions, having no recollection of earlier encounters. The pair escape from the ship through a strange hatch plainly visible to them both but ignored by the crew and passengers. The Doctor and Jo venture through the circuitry of some sort of giant machine and arrive at marshlands.

They soon discover that they are not outside but are still inside the machine. Chased by Drashigs, huge swamp-dwelling carnivores, they escape back into the circuitry. Here, the Doctor realises that they have materialised inside the compression field of a Miniscope, a machine that keeps miniaturised groups of creatures in miniaturised versions of their natural environments. The Time Lords have banned such machines, but apparently one escaped. The Drashigs break into the circuitry and the Doctor and Jo flee back to the ship. They are separated in the confusion as the crew defend against the Drashigs.

The events inside the miniscope are intercut with events involving its owners, travelling showman Vorg and his assistant Shirna, who have just arrived at the planet of Inter Minor but are suspected of being spies and refused entrance by a tribunal. The tribunal learns that objects removed from the machine soon return to their normal size when Vorg extracts a foreign object stuck in the circuitry – actually the TARDIS – from the machine. Two of the tribunal members, Kalik and Orum, dissatisfied with the leadership of their planet, plot to let the Drashigs escape from the machine and allow them to wreak havoc, causing a crisis and the president's resignation.

The Doctor eventually finds a way to the real outside and is restored to normal size. He cooperates with a reluctant Vorg to return into the machine by linking it with the TARDIS. After he goes back into the Scope, which is now overheating and losing its life support due to the Drashigs' damage, the device he attached is shot by a tribunal member and ceases to function, leaving the Doctor stranded. He finds Jo, but they collapse on the floor as the life support on the machine fails.

Two Drashigs escape, but Vorg kills them by fixing the eradicator, sabotaged by the mutinous tribunal members, who later are killed by the Drashigs. He fixes the Doctor's device, pushing the Phase Two switch which brings the Doctor and Jo back, just in time, and also returning all of the Scope's other occupants to their rightful space-time positions.

As the penniless Vorg tries to get enough credit bars to return home by using the old three-magum-pods-and-a-yarrow-seed trick, the two travellers depart in the TARDIS.

=== Continuity ===
The aliens on display in Vorg's miniscope include: Drashigs, Ogrons and Cybermen.

== Production ==
Working titles for this story included Peepshow. This story was recorded as part of the production block for the previous season but deliberately held over for Season 10. This was to enable Barry Letts to direct, since his role as producer would have made it difficult to do so at the start of a production block (as he had found out with Terror of the Autons).

The titles for Carnival of Monsters were prepared, alongside the next serial, Frontier in Space, with a new arrangement of the theme music performed by Paddy Kingsland on a synthesizer. Known as the "Delaware" arrangement (the BBC Radiophonic Workshop was based on Delaware Road), it proved unpopular with BBC executives, so the original Delia Derbyshire theme was restored, and only appears on an uncorrected version of episode two that was shipped to Australia in error. This edit, which also featured a few extra scenes, was used in the 1995 VHS release. (The opening and closing title sequence versions of the theme have been included as an extra on the DVD release of the story. The original 2m 30sec theatrical release of this music was wiped many years ago.)

The ship used was the RFA Robert Dundas which had been decommissioned and was scrapped immediately after filming. As the ship was actually in transit on its final voyage down the River Medway in Kent, all external shots had to be filmed at a low angle or the banks of the estuary would have been visible.

=== Cast notes ===
Ian Marter later played the Fourth Doctor companion Harry Sullivan. He had previously auditioned for the role of Captain Mike Yates. Tenniel Evans was a long-time co-star of Jon Pertwee in The Navy Lark. Michael Wisher had already appeared twice in Third Doctor stories and provided Dalek voices in others, and would later be the first actor to portray Davros. Peter Halliday had appeared previously in the Second Doctor story The Invasion (1968).

Both Cheryl Hall and Jenny McCracken were earlier considered for the part of companion Jo Grant. According to the DVD commentary for the 'Special Edition' of the story, they were on the final shortlist of six actresses seen for the role. Producer Barry Letts promised both actresses he'd use them in the future after offering the part of Grant to Katy Manning.

== Broadcast and reception ==
Episode	Title	Run time	Original release date	UK viewers (millions)	Archive
1	"Episode One"	24:46	27 January 1973	9.5	PAL 2" colour videotape
2	"Episode Two"	24:11	3 February 1973	9.0	PAL 2" colour videotape
3	"Episode Three"	24:49	10 February 1973	9.0	PAL 2" colour videotape
4	"Episode Four"	24:10	17 February 1973	9.2	PAL 2" colour videotape

When the serial was repeated on BBC2 in November 1981, daily, Monday-Thursday (16 November 1981 to 19 November 1981), at 5.40pm as part of "The Five Faces of Doctor Who", Barry Letts (then Doctor Who executive producer) requested that the last few moments of episode 4 be edited to remove a shot where actor Peter Halliday's bald cap had slipped. The ratings for the repeats were 4.9, 4.5, 5.6 & 6.0 million viewers respectively.

In 2010, Mark Braxton of Radio Times wrote that "the premise is ingenious" and "[furnished] with rich, imagination-kindling fare". He praised the guest cast, though he felt the Drashigs were a mixed bag. DVD Talk's John Sinnott gave the serial three and a half out of five stars, describing it as "light and fun" and praising the Miniscope and guest actor Leslie Dwyer. Neela Debnath of The Independent wrote that Carnival of Monsters had a "well-crafted plot that keeps the audience guessing for quite a while and this suspense serves as the driving force behind the serial". She felt that the Drashigs still worked because they were "such hideous-looking creatures". On the other hand, IGN reviewer Arnold T. Blumburg named the serial one of the worst of the Pertwee tenure, stating that it had "the most appalling character, set, and costume design in the era's history" and that some of the guest actors were wasted. In 2013, Den of Geek's Andrew Blair selected Carnival of Monsters as one of the ten Doctor Who stories that would make great musicals.

== Commercial releases ==
=== In print ===
Doctor Who and the Carnival of Monsters
- Author: Terrance Dicks
- Cover artist: Chris Achilleos
- Series: Doctor Who book: Target novelisations
- Release number: 8
- Publisher: Target Books
- Publication date: 20 January 1977
- ISBN: 0-491-02114-3

A novelisation of this serial, written by Terrance Dicks, was published by Target Books in January 1977.

=== Home media ===
Carnival of Monsters was released on VHS in April 1995. Episode 2 was an early edit with extra scenes and the "Delaware" arrangement of the theme tune. Episode 4 accidentally used the 1981 edit. This story was released on DVD in the United Kingdom on 15 June 2002, using the originally transmitted versions of episodes 2 and 4. It was released on DVD in the United States on 1 July 2003. A special edition of the DVD was released in the United Kingdom on 28 March 2011 in the second of the Revisitations box sets. It was released on Blu-ray as part of "The Collection - Season 10" boxed set in July 2019.
