= Crockett (surname) =

Crockett is a surname of British origin, which derives from the Middle English word "croket", meaning "a large curl"., although some are also derived from the French name "Crocketagne". The name may refer to:

- Affion Crockett (born 1974), American actor
- Alex Crockett (born 1981), British rugby player
- Alexander G. Crockett (1862–1919), American politician
- Alvin Crockett (1831–1902), American politician
- Andrew Crockett (banker) (1943–2012), British banker
- Anne B. Crockett-Stark (born 1942), American politician
- Anthony Crockett (bishop), (1945–2008), British bishop
- Anthony Crockett (soldier) (1756–1838), American soldier and politician
- Basil Crockett (1877–1939), British soldier
- Bob Crockett (1863–1935), Australian cricket umpire
- Charley Crockett (born 1984), American blues, country and Americana musician
- Clare Crockett (1982–2016), Catholic nun
- Cordell Crockett (born 1965), American guitarist
- Damarea Crockett (born 1997), American football player
- Davey Crockett (baseball) (1875–1961), American baseball player
- David Crockett (wrestling) (born 1946), American professional wrestling announcer
- Davy Crockett (1786–1836), American frontiersman
- Davy Crockett (outlaw) (1853–1876), American outlaw
- Dick Crockett (1915–1979), American actor
- Earl C. Crockett (1903–1975), American politician
- Effie Crockett (1857–1940), American actress
- G. L. Crockett (1928–1967), American singer
- George Crockett Jr. (1909–1997), American politician
- Granville Smith Crockett (1799–c. 1838/1846), American politician from Tennessee
- Henri Crockett (born 1974), American football player
- Ingram Crockett (1856–1936), American writer
- Ivory Crockett (born 1948), American sprinter
- James Crockett (soccer) (1910–1986), American soccer player
- James Underwood Crockett (1930–1979), American gardener and television presenter
- Jasmine Crockett (born 1981), American politician
- Jim Crockett (1909–1973), American professional wrestling promoter
- Jim Crockett Jr. (1944–2021), American professional wrestling promoter
- John Crockett (director) (1918–1987), British stage and television director
- John Crockett (frontiersman) (1754–1794), American frontiersman, soldier, and father of Davy
- John McClannahan Crockett (1816–1887), American politician
- John Watkins Crockett Jr. (1818–1874), American politician
- John Wesley Crockett (1807–1852), American politician
- Joseph Crockett (1905–2001), American sport shooter
- Juli Crockett (born 1975), American playwright
- Kennedy M. Crockett (1920–2001), American diplomat
- Larry Crockett (1926–1955), American racing car driver
- Linda Crockett (born 1950), American writer
- Lucy Herndon Crockett (1914–2002), American novelist
- Michael Crockett (born 1983), Australian rugby player
- Molly J. Crockett (born 1983), American neuroscientist
- Montay Crockett (born 1993), American football player
- Ray Crockett (born 1967), American football player
- Rita Crockett (born 1957), American volleyball player
- Robert O. Crockett (1881–1955), American politician
- S. R. Crockett (1860–1914), British writer
- W. Edward Crockett, American politician
- William J. Crockett (1914–1999), American diplomat
- Willis Crockett (born 1966), American football player
- Wilson A. Crockett, Canadian politician
- Wyatt Crockett (born 1983), New Zealand rugby player
- Zack Crockett (born 1972), American football player

== Fictional characters ==
- Isaiah Crockett, a character in DC Comics
- Sonny Crockett, a character in Miami Vice

== See also ==
- Crockett (disambiguation)
