= Crockett =

Crockett may refer to:

== People and fictional characters ==
- Davy Crockett, American politician, militia officer and frontiersman
- Crockett Gillmore (born 1991), American National Football League player
- Crockett Johnson, pen name of David Johnson Liesk (1906-1975), American cartoonist and children's book illustrator
- Crockett (surname), a list of persons and fictional characters with the surname

== Places ==
=== United States ===
- Crockett, California, a census-designated place
- Crockett, Kentucky, an unincorporated community
- Crockett, Texas, a city
- Crockett, Virginia, an unincorporated community
- Crockett, West Virginia, an unincorporated community
- Crockett County, Tennessee
- Crockett County, Texas
- Fort Crockett, Galveston Island, Texas
- Crockett Lake, Washington
- Crockett Creek, Missouri

=== Antarctica ===
- Mount Crockett, Ross Dependency

== Other uses ==
- Crockett Cup, professional wrestling event
- Crockett High School (disambiguation)
- Crockett State School, a juvenile correctional facility in Crockett, Texas
- Crockett Street, Beaumont, Texas
- USS Crockett, two US Navy ships
- M29 Davy Crockett, a jeep (or APC) mounted nuclear weapon system

== See also ==
- Crocket, a hook-shaped decorative element common in Gothic architecture
- Crockett Formation, a geologic formation in Texas
- Crockett House (disambiguation)
- The Crocketts, a Welsh band
