= The Crusade (Doctor Who) =

1965 Doctor Who serial

014 – The Crusade
- Doctor Who serial
- Richard the Lionheart (Julian Glover) speaks with the First Doctor (William Hartnell), with Ian (William Russell) and Vicki (Maureen O'Brien) in the background. Critics praised Glover and Hartnell's performances.

Cast
- Doctor: William Hartnell – First Doctor
- Companions: William Russell – Ian Chesterton; Jacqueline Hill – Barbara Wright; Maureen O'Brien – Vicki
- Others: Walter Randall – El Akir; Roger Avon – Saphadin; Bernard Kay – Saladin; Julian Glover – Richard the Lionheart; David Anderson – Reynier de Marun; Bruce Wightman – William de Tornebu; John Flint – William des Preaux; Reg Pritchard – Ben Daheer; Tony Caunter – Thatcher; Jean Marsh – Joanna; Gábor Baraker – Luigi Ferrigo; John Bay – Earl of Leicester; Robert Lankesheer – Chamberlain; George Little – Haroun; Petra Markham – Safiya; Sandra Hampton – Maimuna; Zohra Segal – Sheyrah; Viviane Sorrél – Fatima; Diana McKenzie – Hafsa; Tutte Lemkow – Ibrahim; David Brewster – Turkish Bandit; Billy Cornelius – Man-at-Arms; Derek Ware, Valentino Musetti, Chris Konyils, Raymond Novak, Anthony Colby – Saracen Warriors

Production
- Directed by: Douglas Camfield
- Written by: David Whitaker
- Script editor: Dennis Spooner
- Produced by: Verity Lambert
- Music by: Dudley Simpson
- Production code: P
- Series: Season 2
- Running time: 4 episodes, 25 minutes each
- Episode(s) missing: 2 episodes (2 and 4)
- First broadcast: 27 March 1965
- Last broadcast: 17 April 1965

Chronology
← Preceded by The Web Planet	Followed by → The Space Museum

The Crusade is the sixth serial of the second season of the British science fiction television series Doctor Who. Written by David Whitaker and directed by Douglas Camfield, the serial was broadcast on BBC1 in four weekly parts from 27 March to 17 April 1965. In this serial, the First Doctor (William Hartnell) and his travelling companions Ian Chesterton (William Russell), Barbara Wright (Jacqueline Hill), and Vicki (Maureen O'Brien) arrive in 12th century Palestine during the Third Crusade, and find themselves entangled in the conflict between King Richard the Lionheart (Julian Glover) and Saladin (Bernard Kay). They also meet King Richard's sister Lady Joanna (Jean Marsh) and Saladin's brother Saphadin (Roger Avon).

Whitaker wrote the serial after departing his role as the show's story editor in 1964. He was fascinated by the Third Crusade, and found the historical figures effective material for a character drama, particularly the relationship between King Richard and his sister. Story editor Dennis Spooner was impressed by the maturity and near-Shakespearean nature of Whitaker's scripts, and Camfield considered them the best he directed for the show. Viewership fell from the previous serial and dropped throughout the four weeks, but was considered acceptable. The Crusade received positive reviews, with praise directed at the writing, performances, and set design. Two of the four episodes remain missing after the BBC wiped them from the archives. The story received several print adaptations and home media releases, with the missing episodes reconstructed using off-air recordings.

== Plot ==
The TARDIS materialises in 12th century Palestine during the time of the Third Crusade. When the First Doctor (William Hartnell), Ian Chesterton (William Russell), Barbara Wright (Jacqueline Hill), and Vicki (Maureen O'Brien) emerge, they find themselves in the middle of a Saracen ambush. In the confusion, Barbara is seized by a Saracen from behind while the rest of the TARDIS crew stop the attackers from killing William de Tornebu (Bruce Wightman), an associate of Richard the Lionheart (Julian Glover). Barbara and William des Preaux (John Flint) are presented to Saladin's brother Saphadin (Roger Avon) by El Akir (Walter Randall), who mistakenly believes them to be King Richard and his sister Lady Joanna. When des Preaux reveals their true identities, El Akir is furious; before he can act, Saladin (Bernard Kay) emerges and is intrigued by Barbara. He invites her to entertain him with her stories at supper.

Ian, anxious to rescue Barbara, asks for the King's help, but the irritated monarch tells Ian that Barbara can remain with Saladin until her death. De Tornebu and the Doctor are able to convince the King to change his mind. Ian is knighted so that he may serve as an emissary; he is sent to Saladin's court to both request the release of des Preaux and Barbara, and to offer the hand of the real Lady Joanna (Jean Marsh) in marriage to Saphadin in order to create peace. This makes Joanna indignant and she refuses her consent. Ian delivers his message to Saladin, after which Saladin grants Ian leave to search for Barbara. During his search, Ian is attacked by bandits and knocked out. One of the bandits, Ibrahim (Tutte Lemkow), ties him down with stakes in the hot sun and daubs him with honey, aiming to kill him via scaphism. Barbara twice escapes from El Akir's capture, hiding out in the Emir's harem on the second occasion. El Akir tries to find Barbara, but she is hidden by a sympathetic harem girl named Maimuna (Sandra Hampton).

Ian eventually tricks Ibrahim into untying his feet and overpowers him. Ian convinces the bandit to accompany him to Lydda and aid him in his quest for Barbara. Meanwhile, El Akir bursts in and is about to attack Barbara when Haroun (George Little)—a man who had aided Barbara with shelter—arrives and fatally stabs him. Ian arrives and helps Haroun subdue the guards. Haroun is reunited with Maimuna, his long lost daughter, and Barbara and Ian head for the TARDIS. The Doctor, who has been avoiding involvement in court politics, attempts to make a break for the TARDIS. He is caught by the Earl of Leicester (John Bay), who thinks the Doctor is a spy for Saladin and sentences him to death. Ian arrives and, presenting himself as "Sir Ian of Jaffa", tells the Earl of Leicester that he will carry out the execution himself. The Doctor asks for one last chance to see Jaffa before he dies. The Earl of Leicester agrees, and the Doctor is able to sneak away to the TARDIS with the rest of the crew and leave.

== Production ==
=== Conception and writing ===
After departing his role as Doctor Who's story editor in October 1964, David Whitaker moved into freelance work. He was immediately commissioned to write the two-part Doctor Who serial The Rescue to begin the show's second production block. On 1 November 1964, producer Verity Lambert commissioned Whitaker to write a four-part historical serial to balance its science-fiction stories. The scripts were delivered by 15 January 1965, and titled Dr Who and the Crusades; working titles for the serial include Dr Who and the Saracen Hordes and The Lion-heart. (Note: The working titles for the second through fourth episodes were "Damsel in Distress", "Changing Fortunes", and "The Knight of Jaffa".) The Third Crusade is a historical setting that had fascinated Whitaker; he found that some of the historical figures—namely King Richard and his sister Joan, whose affectionate relationship he considered "almost incestuous in its intensity"—were effective material for a character drama. Depictions of the sexual relationship between the siblings were cut from the script, partly as Hartnell found it unsuitable for the family show; Glover was disappointed by their removal.

The serial depicts two historical events: King Richard's attempt at peace by offering his sister in marriage to Saladin's brother Saphadin in October 1191, and the ambush of King Richard near Jaffa in November 1191. The timing of the events were rearranged for dramatic purposes. Story editor Dennis Spooner was impressed by the maturity and near-Shakespearean nature of Whitaker's scripts. Douglas Camfield was assigned to direct The Crusade, having worked as a production assistant on earlier serials An Unearthly Child (1963) and Marco Polo (1964) and proven himself a capable director of the third episode of Planet of Giants (1964). Hill enjoyed working with Camfield again, and O'Brien (who was newer to the series) found him dynamic; Hartnell was pleased to work with a director he liked. Camfield praised Whitaker's writing and research, declaring the serial "the best Doctor Who script I've ever worked on".

Barry Newbery worked on the serial's set design. He used the 1962 volume Behind the Veil of Arabia by Jørgen Bitsch for inspiration. The images of the original architecture from the Crusades were particularly useful for Newbery. The props adorning the sets were hired from Old Times Props House. Camfield engaged Dudley Simpson, who had previously scored Planet of Giants, to compose the incidental music of The Crusade. Nine minutes of music was recorded on 1 March 1965, performed by five musicians on a range of instruments. The Crusade was the last collaboration between Camfield and Simpson; a falling out between the two shortly after the serial's airing led to Camfield's refusal to hire Simpson. When he became aware that he had misjudged Simpson many years later, Camfield intended to hire him again, but died before doing so. The serial used sound effects extensively.

=== Casting and characters ===
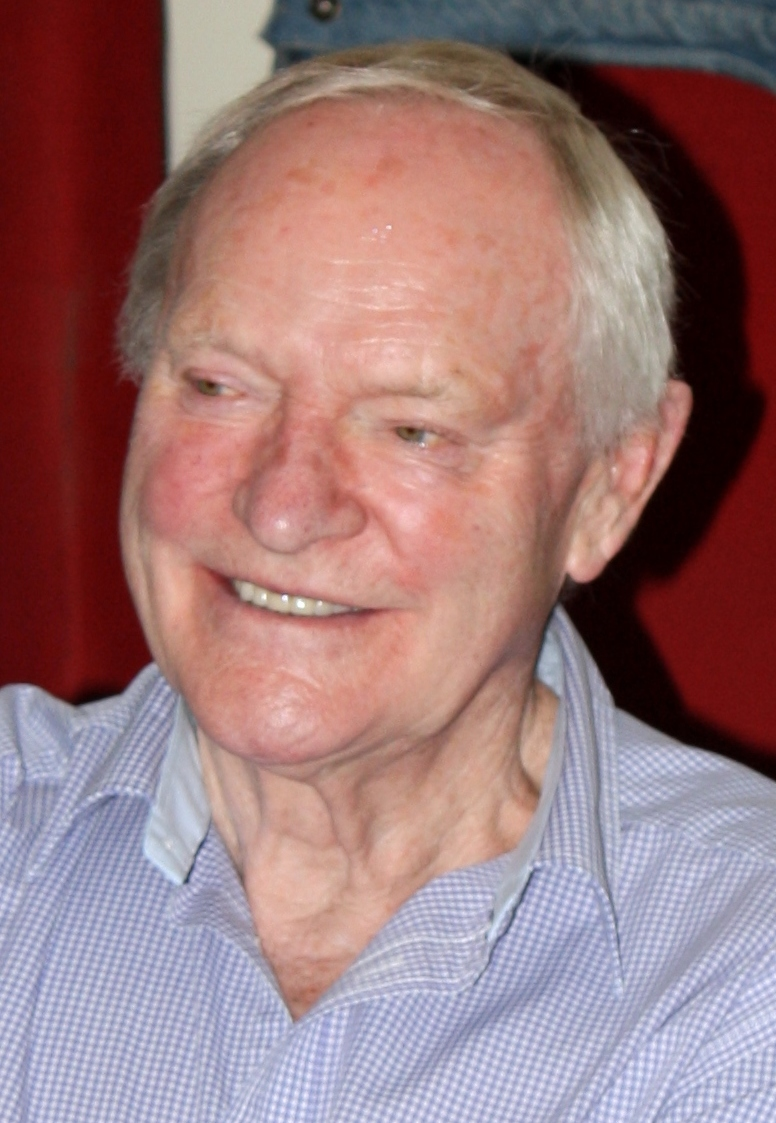
Julian Glover in 2011

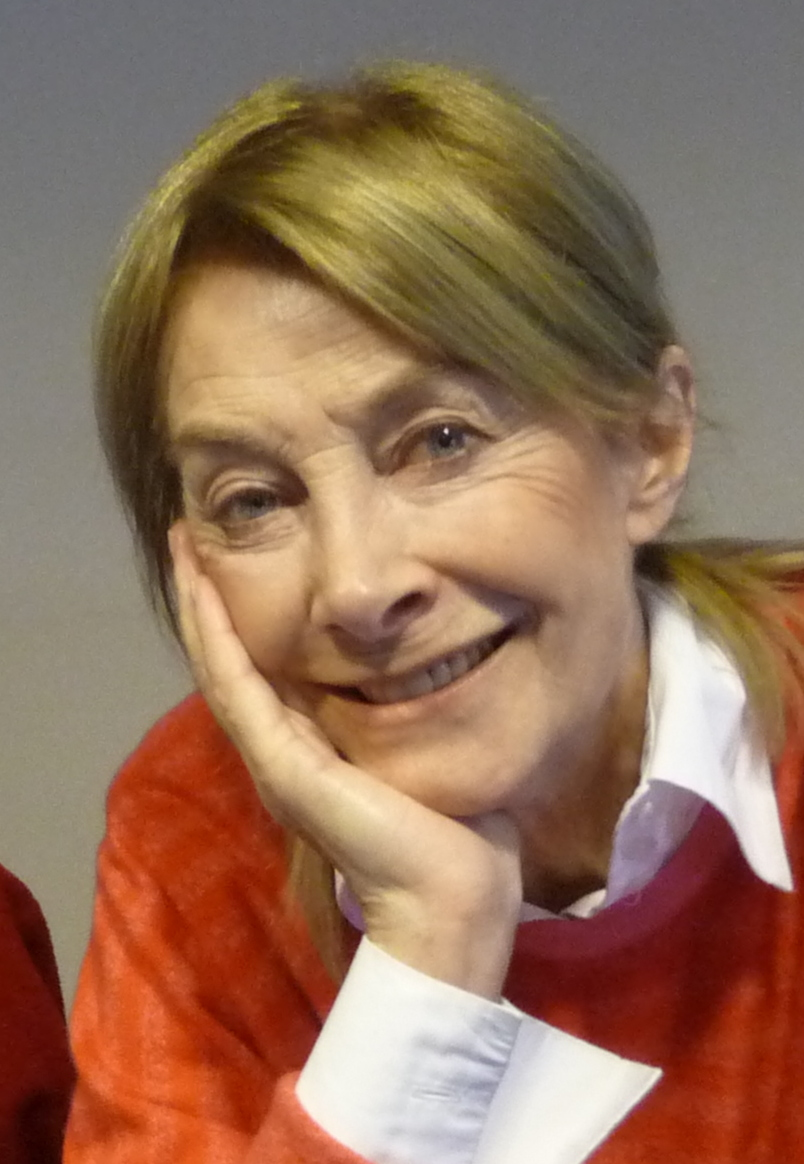
Jean Marsh in 2009

Glover and Marsh were cast as Richard the Lionheart and his sister Lady Joanna, respectively.

Camfield was impressed with Glover's performance in An Age of Kings in 1960, which led to his casting in the serial. Glover expressed excitement to work with Camfield, and to work with Russell again; he found Hill welcoming, but felt that Hartnell was not fond of him. When it appeared that Glover may not be available, Camfield interviewed Nicholas Courtney for the role, having known him at school in Egypt, but felt that he was not suitable. Marsh was cast as Joanna; she had previously worked with Hartnell in Will Any Gentleman...? (1953), during which she met her husband, Third Doctor actor Jon Pertwee. Adrienne Hill was also considered for the role, and read for Camfield and Lambert; they decided that she was not tall enough. Marsh recalled that she and Glover decided to act "slightly too loving for a brother and sister", which Lambert noticed and noted. The European actors in foreign roles were "blacked up" for the serial by the make-up department. Walter Randall was cast as El Akir, having been good friends with Camfield since working together on Gerry Halliday in 1951; Randall previously appeared in the series as Tonila in The Aztecs (1964). Several other actors had also appeared in previous serials, namely Marco Polo.

=== Filming ===
Early 35mm stock filming took place from 16–18 February 1965 on the sound stages at BBC Television Film Studios. Russell was released from rehearsals for "Invasion" (the fifth episode of the preceding serial, The Web Planet) to perform action sequences on 16 February to accommodate for his holiday during the filming of the third episode; the first action sequence, a fight with a Saracen warrior, was choreographed by fight arranger Derek Ware. For a shot in which ants advance upon Ian in the fourth episode, assistant floor manager Michael E. Briant arranged for the supply of 75 black ants from London Zoo. Russell refused to perform a shot in which the ants move up Ian's arm to his hand; Camfield's production assistant Viktors Ritelis doubled for Russell instead. Hill was released from rehearsals for "Invasion" on 18 February to film for the serial.

Rehearsals for the first episode began on 1 March 1965. Weekly filming began in Studio 1 at Riverside Studios on 5 March 1965. For the first episode, a trained hawk was supplied by John Holmes of the Formakin Animal Centre in Benson, Oxfordshire. O'Brien was absent from rehearsals for the second episode on 11 March to film for the subsequent serial, The Space Museum (1965). Russell was absent from filming the third episode as he was on holiday. The establishing shot of a desert in the third episode was sourced from 9 feet (2.7 m) of silent 35mm stock footage supplied by the ABPC Film Exchange. During recording of the final episode on 26 March, Lemkow injured himself with a knife, which went to a finger bone on his right hand; he was taken to hospital for a tetanus shot. Camfield arranged for a cow carcass to be present during recording in order to achieve particular shots through the rotting rib cage; the carcass attracted flies and emitted an odour beneath the studio lights.

== Reception ==
=== Broadcast and ratings ===
Episode	Title	Run time	Original release date	UK viewers (millions)	Appreciation Index
1	"The Lion"	24:56	27 March 1965	10.5	51
2	"The Knight of Jaffa"^{†}	23:28	3 April 1965	8.5	50
3	"The Wheel of Fortune"	24:51	10 April 1965	9.0	49
4	"The Warlords"^{†}	23:40	17 April 1965	9.5	48

^† Episode is missing

The serial was broadcast on BBC1 in four weekly parts from 27 March to 17 April 1965. Viewership fell from the previous serial; the first episode dropped to 10.5 million views. The second episode fell to 8.5 million views, and dropped out of the top 20 for the week, as did the following two. The third and fourth episodes received 9 and 9.5 million viewers respectively, which were still considered acceptable. The Appreciation Index recovered briefly from the previous serial, moving from 51 to 48 across the four weeks.

The original tapes for the second episode were wiped in 1967, followed by the first and fourth in 1969; the third was also wiped at an unknown date. The overseas film prints were destroyed around 1972 by BBC Enterprises. A 16mm film print of the third episode was retained by the BBC Film and Videotape Library. A film copy of the first episode was discovered in the ownership of film collector Bruce Grenville in New Zealand in January 1999, and returned to the BBC; it was sourced from the New Zealand Broadcasting Corporation, who had acquired the serial in the 1960s but never screened it. The second and fourth episodes remain missing, existing only through tele-snaps and off-air audio recordings made from the original 1965 broadcast.

=== Critical response ===
Following the broadcasting of the second episode in April 1965, John Holmstrom of The New Statesman wrote that the show was failing, citing "the wooden charmlessness of the adventures". Following the serial's broadcast, Bill Edmund of Television Today directed praise at Glover's performance and Whitaker's writing, declaring "the dialogue and the story ... one of the best we have had in this series". Conversely, Television Mail wrote that "the appallingly flat dialogue of Dr Who could hardly be heard ... above the creaking of the plot", noting that the show should only be viewed "by people who have a profound contempt for children".

Retrospective reviews were positive. In The Discontinuity Guide (1995), writers Paul Cornell, Martin Day, and Keith Topping praised the ambition, imagination, and maturity of the storyline, noting that it "manages to avoid racism" but not misogyny. In The Television Companion (1998), David J. Howe and Stephen James Walker called The Crusade a "magnificent story", praising Hartnell's performance in the third episode as "one of his best and most intense performances as the Doctor"; they also applauded Barry Newbery's set design work and Simpson's incidental music. In A Critical History of Doctor Who (1999), John Kenneth Muir wrote that The Crusade "lacks the suspense of The Aztecs, the humor of The Romans and even the complexity of The Reign of Terror", calling it "the beginning of Doctor Who's loss of interest in the 'purely' historical adventures", though wrote that he enjoyed the performances of Glover and Marsh. In 2008, Patrick Mulkern of Radio Times said that The Crusade was "arguably the first story where every aspect of the production works to perfection". He praised the decision to split up the TARDIS crew and allow the viewer to see both sides of the Crusades, and lauded the guest cast, noting that "Walter Randall's El Akir is the most sinister character in the series to date".

== Commercial releases ==
=== In print ===
Doctor Who and the Crusaders
- Cover of the Target Books reprint
- Author: David Whitaker
- Cover artist: Henry Fox (original); Chris Achilleos (reprint)
- Series: Doctor Who novelisations
- Release number: 12
- Publisher: Frederick Muller Ltd (original); Target Books (reprint)
- Publication date: 1966 (original); 1973 (reprint)
- ISBN: 978-0-426-10137-6

A novelisation of this serial, Dr Who and the Crusaders, was written by Whitaker, who added an extensive prologue and action. It was published by Frederick Muller Ltd in 1966, with illustrations by Henry Fox. The novel was republished by Green Dragon/Atlantic in 1967 with new illustrations by an uncredited artist. It was later reprinted by Target Books in 1973 with a cover by Chris Achilleos, by White Lion in 1975, and by W. H. Allen & Co. in 1982; the first two featured Fox's original illustrations, while the third had a new cover by Andrew Skilleter. An updated version of the novel was released in July 2011 by BBC Books, featuring a cover by Achilleos and an introduction by Charlie Higson. An audiobook of the novelisation, read by William Russell, was released by BBC Audio in November 2005 as part of the box set Doctor Who Travels in Time & Space, limited to 8000 copies. A facsimile edition of the original 1966 novel was re-released by BBC Books in November 2016. The serial's scripts, edited by John McElroy, was released in November 1994 by Titan Books.

=== Home media ===
The third episode of The Crusade was included on The Hartnell Years, when it was released on VHS by BBC Enterprises, in June 1991 alongside the pilot of An Unearthly Child (1963) and the final episode of The Celestial Toymaker (1966) with links by Sylvester McCoy. The serial was released in box set on VHS alongside The Space Museum by BBC Worldwide in June 1999, with postcards, a key ring, and a CD of the soundtrack; Russell performed linking material written by Stephen Cole and directed by Paul Vanezis at Ian Levine's house on 23 February 1999. An audio version of the story was released as a twin CD in May 2005, with narration by Russell; it was also included in The Lost TV Episodes: Collection 1 by BBC Audiobooks in August 2010, alongside an additional CD with interviews and copies of the original scripts.

The first and third episodes were included on the DVD set Lost in Time, released in November 2004. It features Russell's introductions from the VHS release, soundtracks from the second and fourth episodes, and an audio commentary for the third episode with Glover and Gary Russell. The third episode was enhanced using the VidFIRE process; the first episode was badly damaged upon its return, and underwent additional cleanup to reduce the severity of a large scratch on-screen. Charles Norton, director of several animated reconstructions, noted in 2019 that an animated version of The Crusade was unlikely to be produced in the near future due to the resources required, such as costumes and characters. The serial was released on Blu-ray on 5 December 2022, alongside the rest of the show's second season as part of The Collection; the existing episodes are remastered, with the two missing episodes reconstructed using off-air photographs and the original soundtrack. The existing episodes were added to BBC iPlayer on 1 November 2023 alongside most other serials.

== Bibliography ==
- Ainsworth, John, ed. (2016). "The Crusade, The Space Museum, The Chase and The Time Meddler". Doctor Who: The Complete History. 5 (11). London: Panini Comics, Hachette Partworks. ISSN 2057-6048.
- Ainsworth, John, ed. (2019). "Shada, Dimensions in Time, The Curse of Fatal Death and Time Crash". Doctor Who: The Complete History. 90 (90). London: Panini Comics, Hachette Partworks. ISSN 2057-6048.
- Cornell, Paul; Day, Martin; Topping, Keith (1995). The Discontinuity Guide. London: Virgin Books. ISBN 978-0-426-20442-8.
- Howe, David J.; Walker, Stephen James (1998). Doctor Who: The Television Companion: Volume 1 (2021 ed.). London: BBC Books. ISBN 978-1-845-83156-1.
- Muir, John Kenneth (1999). A Critical History of Doctor Who on Television. Jefferson, North Carolina: McFarland & Company. ISBN 978-0-786-40442-1.
