= The Time Meddler =

017 – The Time Meddler
- Doctor Who serial
- In his TARDIS, the Monk (Peter Butterworth) explains his plan to the First Doctor (William Hartnell), Vicki (Maureen O'Brien), and Steven Taylor (Peter Purves). Butterworth and Hartnell's performances were praised.

Cast
- Doctor: William Hartnell – First Doctor
- Companions: Maureen O'Brien – Vicki; Peter Purves – Steven Taylor
- Others: Peter Butterworth – The Monk; Alethea Charlton – Edith; Peter Russell – Eldred; Michael Miller – Wulnoth; Michael Guest – Saxon Hunter; Geoffrey Cheshire – Viking Leader; Norman Hartley – Ulf; David Anderson – Sven; Ronald Rich – Gunnar the Giant

Production
- Directed by: Douglas Camfield
- Written by: Dennis Spooner
- Script editor: Donald Tosh
- Produced by: Verity Lambert
- Music by: Charles Botterill (Note: Botterill performed percussive drumbeats for the score. The remainder of the serial uses stock music from several composers: the first episode uses pieces from Lawrence Leonard and Eric Siday; the second episode uses Leonard, Harry Dexter, Trevor Duncan, and Peter Hope; and the fourth episode uses Siday and Roberto Gerhard.)
- Production code: S
- Series: Season 2
- Running time: 4 episodes, 25 minutes each
- First broadcast: 3 July 1965
- Last broadcast: 24 July 1965

Chronology
← Preceded by The Chase	Followed by → Galaxy 4

The Time Meddler is the ninth and final serial of the second season of the British science fiction television series Doctor Who. Written by Dennis Spooner and directed by Douglas Camfield, the serial was broadcast on BBC1 in four weekly parts from 3 to 24 July 1965. Set in Northumbria in 1066, before the Battle of Stamford Bridge, the serial features the time traveller the First Doctor (William Hartnell) and his companions Vicki (Maureen O'Brien) and Steven Taylor (Peter Purves) as they attempt to outwit the time traveller the Monk (Peter Butterworth), who is plotting to change the course of European history by wiping out King Harald Hardrada's Viking invasion fleet, leaving Harold Godwinson and the Saxon soldiers fresh to defeat William of Normandy and the Norman soldiers at the Battle of Hastings.

Former story editor Spooner was commissioned to write The Time Meddler by producer Verity Lambert. He wanted the show to move away from full historical stories, instead blending them with futuristic topics. He studied the Doctor's background in the writers' guide to create his antithesis, the Monk. The Time Meddler was the first serial under new story editor Donald Tosh, and the crew was joined during production by John Wiles, who was soon to replace Lambert as producer. The serial was produced at a low cost to offset the increased budget of the previous serial, The Chase; Camfield opted to forgo a traditional incidental score. The Time Meddler was the first serial to feature Purves in a main role as Steven, having been introduced in The Chase. Filming for the serial took place at Television Centre from June to July 1965.

The Time Meddler received a smaller audience than The Chase, with an average of 8.42 million viewers across the four episodes; the Appreciation Index also saw a drop. Contemporary and retrospective reviews were generally positive, with praise directed at performances of Hartnell and Butterworth, Spooner's script, and Camfield's direction, though the depiction of the villagers was criticised. The story was novelised and released on VHS, DVD, and as an audiobook. In 2020, it was voted the second-best First Doctor story by readers of Doctor Who Magazine.

== Plot ==
The First Doctor (William Hartnell) and Vicki (Maureen O'Brien) find Steven Taylor (Peter Purves) aboard the TARDIS after he stumbled in during a disoriented state on Mechanus. The TARDIS lands on a rocky beach, watched by a monk (Peter Butterworth). It is soon spotted by a Saxon villager, Eldred (Peter Russell), who runs to tell the headman of his village, Wulnoth (Michael Miller). The Doctor establishes the century from a discarded Viking helmet and heads off to the village. Steven and Vicki explore the cliffs above, witnessed by the Monk. The Doctor encounters Edith (Alethea Charlton), Wulnoth's wife, and convinces her that he is a harmless traveller while probing for more information. He discovers that it is 1066, since Harold Godwinson has not yet faced Harald Hardrada at the Battle of Stamford Bridge. At a nearby monastery, monks are heard chanting; arriving at the monastery, the Doctor finds a gramophone playing the chant. He stops the gramophone and the Monk traps him in a cell.

Steven and Vicki encounter Eldred and notice he has a wristwatch, dropped by the Monk. The next morning, they are ambushed by the Saxons and taken to the village council. They convince Wulnoth they are travellers and are given provisions to travel on. Vicki is heartened to hear from Edith that she encountered the Doctor on his way to the monastery. Steven and Vicki visit the monastery, where the Monk tries to dissuade them from entering but gives himself away by describing the Doctor too accurately. Steven and Vicki break in after dark. A Viking attacks Edith, and the Saxons go hunting for the invaders. One is struck down, while his companions, Sven (David Anderson) and Ulf (Norman Hartley), flee. Eldred is badly wounded and Wulnoth takes him to the monastery for help.

While the Monk is occupied with the Saxons, Steven and Vicki find the gramophone. They discover that the Doctor has escaped through a secret passage and returned to the village. The Doctor heads back to the monastery and gains the upper hand when the Monk answers the door; the Doctor begins to question the Monk. Sven and Ulf ambush the Doctor and the Monk but are overpowered, but the Monk slips away during the confrontation. He tries to persuade the villagers to light beacon fires on the cliff tops, secretly wishing to lure the Viking fleet to land; Wulnoth tells the Monk that he agrees, but admits to Edith that he suspects danger.

Steven and Vicki return to the monastery and investigate the crypt, where a heavy power cable extends from a sarcophagus. Looking inside, they discover that it is the Monk's TARDIS, and that he must originate from the same place as the Doctor. The Doctor overpowers the Monk upon the latter's return to the monastery. The Monk reveals his plan to destroy the Viking fleet, which would prevent the Battle of Stamford Bridge and leave the Saxon soldiers completely fresh to defeat William of Normandy at the Battle of Hastings. He boasts that his plan would accelerate mankind's development by centuries. The Doctor denounces the Monk for seeking to alter the course of history and forces him to reveal his TARDIS, where they find Steven and Vicki. The time travellers piece together the Monk's plot, which he insists is intended to stabilise England and benefit Western civilisation.

Ulf and Sven form an alliance with the Monk and tie up the Doctor's party while the three of them take the neutron bomb shells to the cannon on the beach. The scheme is foiled, however, when Wulnoth and the Saxons arrive and engage the fleeing Vikings in a nearby clearing. The Monk hides while the fighting rages, little knowing that the Doctor and his friends have been freed by Edith and are tampering with his TARDIS. With his scheme in ruins, the Monk decides to leave and returns to his TARDIS. When the Monk looks inside, he realises the Doctor has taken the dimensional control and that the interior of his ship has shrunk beyond use, leaving him stranded in 1066. The Doctor, Vicki, and Steven return to the TARDIS and leave.

== Production ==
=== Conception and writing ===
Outgoing story editor Dennis Spooner was commissioned by producer Verity Lambert to write a story introducing new companion Steven Taylor; as story editors commissioning themselves was discouraged, Lambert justified his involvement to head of serials Donald Wilson, citing complications with contracts and budgets, and insufficient time to brief an uninvolved writer, as none of the regular writers were available. Spooner was approved to write the serial on 15 March 1965. Spooner wanted the show to move away from "pure" historical stories like The Reign of Terror (1964) and The Romans (1965), instead hoping to blend them with the show's more futuristic serials. The Time Meddler was the first serial under new story editor Donald Tosh, having been offered to work on either 199 Park Lane or Doctor Who after the cancellation of Compact. He joined the show in April 1965, and was provided with a document titled The History of Doctor Who, outlining the show's story to date (including some upcoming). Tosh enjoyed Spooner's idea of blending historical and futuristic stories. He edited little of Spooner's work.

The serial's working title was Doctor Who and the Monk; the title of The Time Meddler was not final until early June 1965. Production assistant David Maloney joked that the story was referred to as The Vikings during production until the realisation that it had more Saxon extras, upon which it was called The Saxons. The first episode was originally called "The Paradox", changed to "The Watcher" on 20 May. The serial was produced at a low cost to offset the expense of the previous serial, The Chase (1965). Douglas Camfield was assigned as director in April, having recently finished work on The Crusade (1965); he was pleased with Spooner's scripts, finding them among his best. Due to the limited expenses allocated to the serial, Camfield forwent an incidental score, instead opting for percussive drumbeats played by Charles Botterill, who had previously played percussion on Tristram Cary's score for Marco Polo (1964). Botterill recorded eight minutes of music for the second through fourth episodes at Lime Grove Studios in Studio R on 9 June. The remainder of the score was sourced from stock music. Set designer Barry Newbery constructed the Saxon's hut in the style of a cruck, painting the studio floor black to resemble ox blood.

=== Casting and characters ===
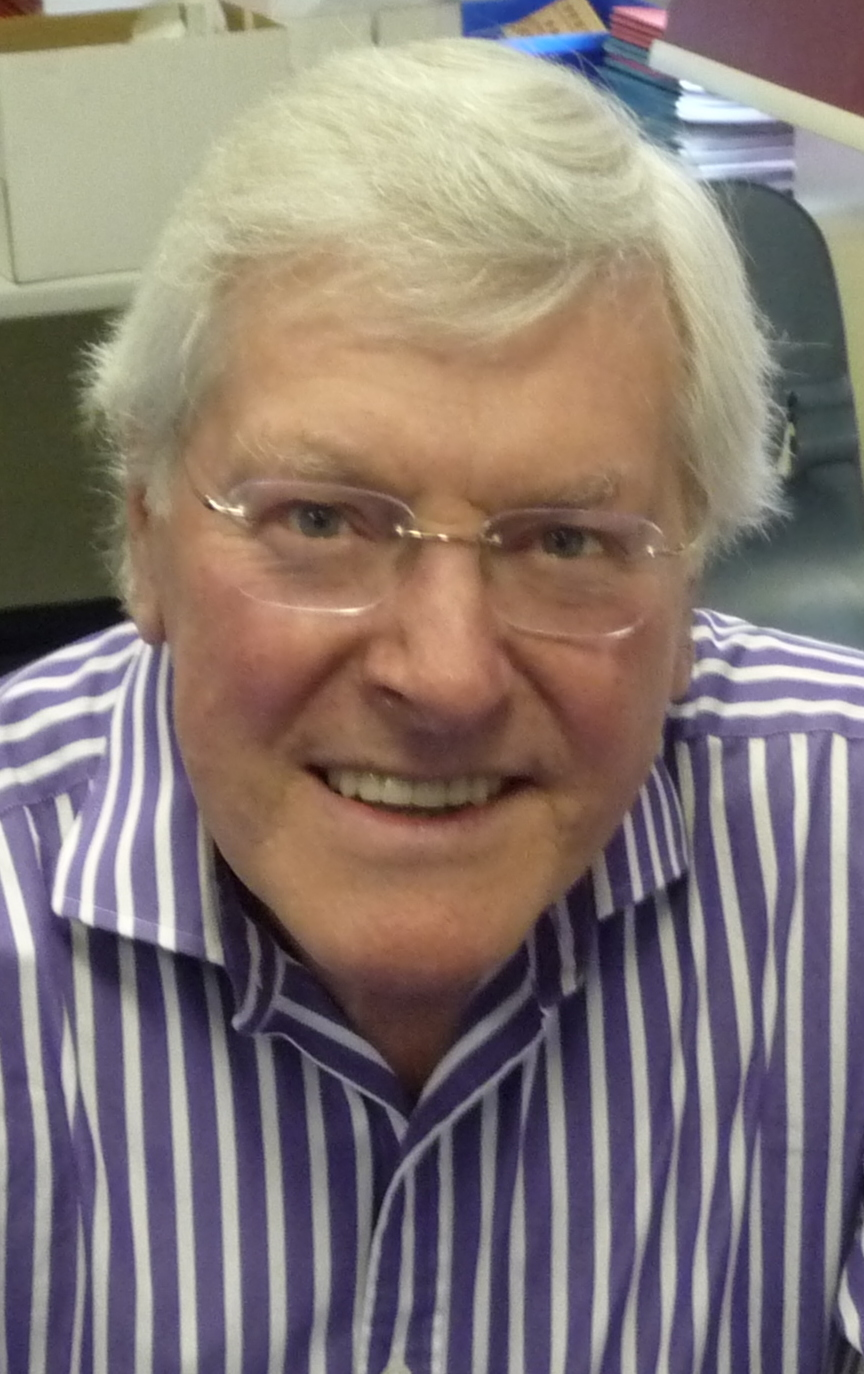
Peter Purves, 2010

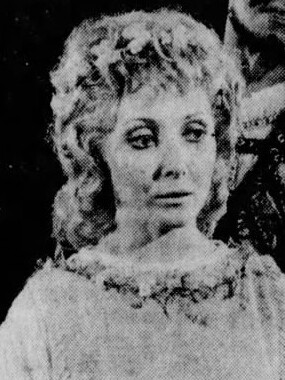
Maureen O'Brien, 1970

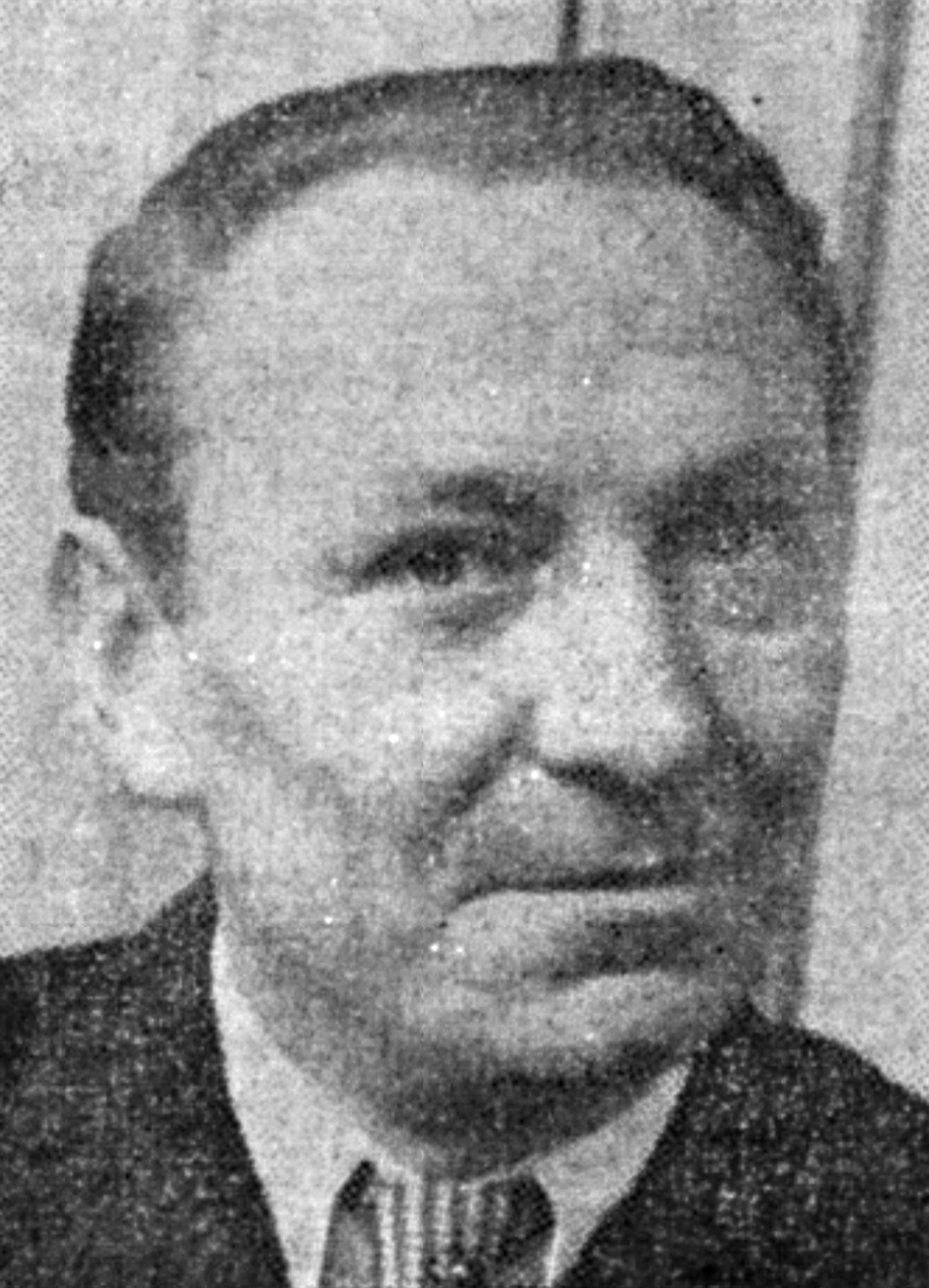
William Hartnell, 1946

The Time Meddler was the first serial to feature Purves as part of the regular cast, joining O'Brien and Hartnell.

Spooner studied the background of the Doctor as originally stated in the writers' guide developed for the programme in 1963 by Sydney Newman, Donald Wilson, and C. E. Webber, and created the Monk as the antithesis of the Doctor; while the Doctor was serious about interfering with the past, the Monk finds it amusing. He envisaged the characters as a schoolboy prankster from the Billy Bunter books; in the script, he was described as "mischievous, sly and cunning ... with a 'naughty boy' look". Lambert suggested the casting of Butterworth as the Monk, having seen his previous work; he was enjoyed by the cast and crew on set, and was friendly with Hartnell. Anderson was hired to choreograph the forest battle in the second episode, and to portray a Viking named Sven; he was previously noted by Camfield for his work as an extra on Marco Polo, and had returned to work on The Aztecs and star in The Crusade. Cast as Ulf, Hartley was an old friend of Camfield's.

The Time Meddler was the first serial to feature Steven Taylor as a full companion. The role of Steven—originally named Michael in the scripts—had not been filled by 13 May, the month before filming began. After witnessing Purves's role as Morton Dill in the recording of The Chase the following day, Lambert and Spooner approached him and offered him the role. Purves accepted the role within days. On 21 May, he was contracted for three stories (13 episodes), with an option for a further 20 episodes by 10 September and another 26 by 4 February 1966. He grew a beard for his role as Steven in the final episode of The Chase, but he wore a fake beard for the first episode of The Time Meddler as Steven becomes cleanshaven partway through. His role as a companion on the show was announced on 18 June 1965. Purves quickly bonded with Hartnell and O'Brien, and they would occasionally have dinner together after rehearsals. Purves was pleased with Spooner's scripts and the development of Steven's character, though O'Brien was unimpressed.

=== Filming ===
The minimal filming required for The Time Meddler allowed additional allocation of production for The Chase. Early 35mm filming took place on 10 May at Ealing Studios on Stages 3A/B, depicting the TARDIS materialising and dematerialising in the first and final episodes, respectively. The remaining film was acquired from stock footage, sourced from the BBC and Pinewood Studios. Recording on the serial was due to take place at Riverside Studios until late May, when it was decided to switch back to Television Centre. Rehearsals for the first episode began on 7 June. By this time, incoming producer John Wiles—set to replace Lambert in the coming months—joined the production. Hartnell found the change unsettling and threw fake tantrums to scare the production team to obey him; he later admitted to other cast members that he was only joking. Weekly recording of the serial began on 11 June in Television Centre Studio 4; recording of the first episode overran by seven minutes as it was discovered that one of the scenes contained more music than had been cleared for use, requiring it to be re-recorded. Camfield was greatly upset by the production overrunning. For the second episode, Hartnell recorded voice clips on 26 June, as he was on holiday during its recording. Footage of the Viking ship in the second episode was sourced from a 1949 BBC Newsreel titled The Land of the Vikings. For the third episode, Butterworth ad-libbed a comment about converting kilometres to miles. The final episode was recorded on 2 July 1965.

== Reception ==
=== Broadcast and ratings ===
Episode	Title	Run time	Original release date	UK viewers (millions)	Appreciation Index
1	"The Watcher"	24:05	3 July 1965	8.9	57
2	"The Meddling Monk"	25:17	10 July 1965	8.8	49
3	"A Battle of Wits"	24:10	17 July 1965	7.7	53
4	"Checkmate"	24:00	24 July 1965	8.3	54

The serial was broadcast on BBC1 in four weekly parts from 3 to 24 July 1965. The first episode was broadcast later than usual—6:55 p.m. instead of 5:40 p.m.—due to an extended edition of the preceding program Grandstand covering the Henley Regatta and Wimbledon Championships final. The final broadcast accidentally omitted Camfield's directing credit by fading out early; Camfield complained to Wiles, who issued a memo requesting that this not be allowed in future. The following three episodes broadcast at the usual time. The summer season and lack of Daleks led to smaller audience numbers than The Chase, with 8.9 and 8.8 million viewers for the first two episodes and a drop to 7.7 and 8.3 million for the final two. The second episode was the highest-rated BBC show of the week South West region; the third episode dropped out of the top 20 programmes of the week, but garnered a larger audience share than ITV. The Appreciation Index score also saw a drop, with scores of 57, 49, 53, and 54 across the four weeks.

The 405-line videotapes of the first, third, and fourth episodes were cleared for wiping from BBC archives on 17 August 1967 and subsequently erased; the second episode was cleared on 31 January 1969, though the BBC retained the 16mm telerecording negatives in its archives. BBC Enterprises continued to market the serial in the 1970s, but sales had diminished by 1977 and the negatives of the first, third, and fourth episodes were subsequently junked. All four episodes were rediscovered in Nigeria in October 1984 and returned to the BBC by February 1985; they were discovered to have been cut, with some missing scenes. A twelve-second clip from the fourth episode remained missing from the complete prints of the serial, as it was removed by censors; it depicted a scene where Vikings are stabbed to death. The audio for the scene was included on the 2008 DVD release, and the visuals were recreated for the 2022 Blu-ray version.

In late 1991, the production team of The Late Show proposed a series of repeats of archived Doctor Who serials; producer Teresa Griffiths allowed BBC technician and Doctor Who fan Steve Roberts to restore The Time Meddler to represent its original broadcast. Roberts used complete 16mm prints of the first and third episodes being held by a private collector to restore most of the cuts; they were transferred to digital D3 tape on 20 December 1991. The repeats were broadcast weekly on BBC2 from 3 to 24 January 1992, garnering an average of 2.59 million viewers across the four episodes. (Note: The 1992 repeat broadcast of the serial achieved viewing figures of 2.37, 2.79, 2.58, and 2.63 million viewers, respectively.) An updated master of the serial was shown at the British Film Institute on October 29, 2022, to promote the Blu-ray set, attended by Purves, Butterworth's son Tyler Butterworth, and Toby Hadoke.

=== Critical response ===
The serial received generally positive reviews. Television Today's Bill Edmund enjoyed the character of the Monk and Butterworth's performance, but was disappointed by the lack of monsters in the serial. An audience report prepared following the first episode's broadcast was generally positive, with several viewers finding the anachronistic items a fascinating twist on the time travel theme, though some failed to understand their purpose; Steven's character was also praised, though some viewers missed Ian Chesterton and Barbara Wright, who departed in the previous serial. J. C. Trewin of The Listener enjoyed the serial, "partly because no mechanical monsters arrived and partly because the logical consequences of time-meddling were faced". In a review for the BBC series Hereward the Wake, The Observer's Maurice Richardson found it difficult to "suspend disbelief" for the show's time setting after watching Doctor Who's "remarkable essay in this period".

Retrospective reviews were also positive. In The Discontinuity Guide (1995), Paul Cornell, Martin Day, and Keith Topping described the serial as "an atmospheric story" and praised the performances, particularly that of Hartnell and Butterworth. In The Television Companion (1998), David J. Howe and Stephen James Walker lauded Butterworth's "deft, understated performance", especially in his scenes with the Doctor, and applauded Camfield's direction as "very polished and features some nice touches", though they felt that the conclusion was simple and that the Vikings and Saxons "are sketched in merely as caricatures". In 2008, Den of Geek's Simon Brew praised Butterworth's performance, noting that the serial "really hits its stride" with the sparring between the Doctor and the Monk, but felt that the story was not enough to cover four episodes. Writing for Total Sci-Fi Online, Jonathan Wilkins described the serial as "an often forgotten gem", praising Hartnell's "remarkable performance"—particularly his scenes alongside Butterworth—and enjoyed the performances of Purves and Charlton, though felt that the other villagers were the "weakest element" of the story.

IGN's Arnold T. Blumberg highlighted the chemistry between Hartnell and Butterworth, the competency of Vicki and Steven, and the visual atmosphere, but felt that the plot contained some clichés. In 2009, Patrick Mulkern of Radio Times called the serial "an utter delight" and "the Doctor Who equivalent of comfort food", praising Butterworth's performance and Camfield's direction. In 2012, The A.V. Club's Christopher Bahn enjoyed the Monk and the introduction of Steven, and lauded the pacing of Spooner's script and Camfield's direction. The Time Meddler was voted the second-best First Doctor story by Doctor Who Magazine readers in 2020; writer Emma Reeves cited the conflict between the Doctor and the Monk, and the serial's reinvention of several elements that would later define the show.

== Commercial releases ==
The Time Meddler
- Author: Nigel Robinson
- Cover artist: Jeff Cummins
- Series: Doctor Who book: Target novelisations
- Release number: 126
- Publisher: Target Books
- Publication date: October 1987
- ISBN: 0-491-03337-0

A novelisation of this serial, written by Target Books editor Nigel Robinson, was published as a hardback by W. H. Allen in October 1987, followed by a paperback by Target in March 1988; the cover was designed by Jeff Cummins. A new edition with a revised cover was published in May 1992 to coincide with the earlier BBC2 repeat of the story. An audiobook of the novelisation, read by Purves, was published in October 2016. Selected stock music from the serial was included in Space Adventures, a cassette soundtrack compiled by Julian Knott and published by DWAS Reference Department in September 1987, limited to 300 copies; it was expanded and re-issued as a CD in October 1998.

The Time Meddler was released on VHS by BBC Worldwide in The First Doctor Box Set in November 2002, with photomontage covers. The serial was released on DVD by BBC DVD in February 2008, featuring a documentary on the First Doctor comic stories, a comparison of the restoration process for the serial, and an audio commentary with Purves, Lambert, Tosh, Newbery, and moderator Clayton Hickman; the DVD was dedicated to Lambert, who died in 2007. A new scan was released on Blu-ray on 5 December 2022, alongside the rest of the show's second season as part of The Collection, and was added to BBC iPlayer on 1 November 2023 alongside most other serials.

The story was revisited as part of the spin-off series Tales of the TARDIS, released on BBC iPlayer on 1 November 2023, with new scenes starring O'Brien and Purves.

== Bibliography ==
- Ainsworth, John, ed. (2016). "The Crusade, The Space Museum, The Chase and The Time Meddler". Doctor Who: The Complete History. 5 (11). London: Panini Comics, Hachette Partworks. ISSN 2057-6048.
- Cornell, Paul; Day, Martin; Topping, Keith (1995). The Discontinuity Guide. London: Virgin Books. ISBN 0-426-20442-5.
- Howe, David J.; Walker, Stephen James (1998). Doctor Who: The Television Companion: Volume 1 (2021 ed.). London: BBC Books. ISBN 978-1-845-83156-1.
- Howe, David J.; Walker, Stephen James; Stammers, Mark (1994). The Handbook: The Unofficial and Unauthorised Guide to the Production of 'Doctor Who'. Vol. 1 (2016 ed.). London: Telos Publishing. ISBN 978-1-845-83941-3.
- Muir, John Kenneth (1999). A Critical History of Doctor Who on Television. Jefferson, North Carolina: McFarland & Company. ISBN 978-0-786-40442-1.
- Reeves, Emma (July 2020). Barnes, Alan (ed.). "The World Cup of the First Doctor". Doctor Who Magazine (552). Royal Tunbridge Wells, Kent: Panini Comics: 38–49. ISSN 0957-9818.
