= Crockatt =

Crockatt is a surname. Notable people with the surname include:

- Ian Crockatt (born 1949), Scottish poet and translator
- Joan Crockatt (born 1955), Canadian politician

== See also ==
- Crockett (surname)
