= William Stern =

William Stern may refer to:

- William Stern (businessman) (1935–2020), owner of the British Stern Group of companies
- William Stern (psychologist) (1871–1938), German psychologist and philosopher
- William Stern, father of American surrogate child Baby M
- William Joseph Stern (1891–1965), physicist and jet engine developer
- William M. Stern, rabbi at Temple Sinai in Oakland, California
- Bill Stern (1907–1971), American actor and sportscaster

== See also ==
- William T. Stearn (1911–2001), British botanist
- Bill Stearns (1853–1898), American baseball player
