= John Neely =

John Neely may refer to:

- John Neely (musician), jazz tenor saxophonist and arranger
- John Neely (tennis) (1872–1941), American tennis player

== See also ==
- J. Neely Johnson (1825–1872), American lawyer and politician
- John Neely House, a historic house in Thompsons Station, Tennessee
