= Ian Cullen =

British actor (1939–2019)

- Born: George Ian Cullen; 20 October 1939; West Boldon, County Durham, England
- Died: 12 November 2019 (aged 80); Surrey Heath, England
- Occupation: Actor
- Spouse: Yvonne Quenet (m. 1970)

George Ian Cullen (20 October 1939 – 12 November 2019) was a British actor.

Cullen first became interested in acting when appearing in a pantomime aged four (late 1943). He trained at RADA with a scholarship when he was 16.

An early television appearance was as David Balfour in the BBC's 1963 adaptation of Robert Louis Stevenson's Kidnapped, set in Scotland in 1751. Balfour is captured while on board a ship, and here he meets Jacobite rebel Alan Breck Stewart with whom he forges an alliance, escaping to the Scottish Highlands while trying to avoid the redcoats. All twelve episodes are believed missing from the archive.

Another notable early television appearance was in 1964 when he played Ixta in the four-part Doctor Who story The Aztecs. He was interviewed for that serial's DVD release in 2002. In 2012, he returned to Doctor Who to play Nadeyan in the Big Finish audio drama "Dark Eyes".

Cullen had numerous roles in British film and television, including regular roles in Emergency Ward 10 during its final year (as Warren Kent – 1966–1967), Z-Cars (as Joe Skinner – 1969–1975), When the Boat Comes In (as Geordie Watson - 1977–1981) and Channel 5's soap opera Family Affairs (as Angus Hart – 1997–1999). He has guest starred in numerous television dramas, including The Bill, Dalziel & Pascoe and Sorry!. In 2011, he starred as Baron Sterling in the award-winning feature film Dawn of the Dragonslayer.

When joining the cast of Z Cars in 1969 he became a household name. By this time this popular series was broadcast in a twice-weekly 25-minute format. His character Joe Skinner stayed for six years and a total of 226 episodes. The occasionally troubled Skinner enjoyed popularity with the viewing public, being promoted and un-promoted along the way to and from Detective. In the character's final Z Cars appearance "Distance" (Series 9, Episode 28), Skinner was gunned down in the line of duty. The death of any policeman in real life or fiction was still uncommon in the 1970s and this moment became one of TV's biggest dramatic shocks of the decade.. After Z Cars, Cullen wrote some episodes of the popular ITV children's series The Paper Lads (1977–78).

It was not the only time Cullen played a character with an untimely ending. His character Angus Hart, was the original lead of the Channel 5 soap opera Family Affairs, appearing in over 400 episodes. Angus Hart was killed in a shock storyline when the entire Hart family were killed in a boat explosion.

Cullen's stage work was extensive and saw him perform all over the country, with eight West-End productions to his name and two years with the Royal Shakespeare Company. He won rave reviews for his performance as Jay in Road to the Sea at the Orange Tree Theatre, in 2003. In 2008 he won a Gold Award for his narration of the feature-length documentary The Destiny of Britain (2007).

As well as his acting commitments, Cullen also wrote several television series, films and radio plays. He found time to run a very successful youth drama group in Surrey (Surrey Heath Young Actors Company) for nearly 30 years. He was assisted in this venture by his wife Yvonne Quenet, who is also an actress and drama teacher. They were married for over 30 years and had three daughters.

== Selected TV and filmography ==
- Doctor Who - Ixta (The Aztecs, 1964)
- Department S - Special Branch agent (The Bones of Byrom Blain, 1970)
- Z-Cars PC/DC Joe Skinner – (226 episodes, 1969–1975)
- Voyage of the Damned – Radio Officer Steinman (1976)
- When the Boat Comes In – Geordie Watson (4 episodes, 1977–1981)
- The Gambling Man (1995) – Paddy Connor
- Family Affairs – Angus Hart (400+ Episodes, 1997–1999)
- Gabriel & Me – Ridley (2001)
- Dawn of the Dragonslayer – Baron Sterling (2011)
- White Oak – Johnny (2018)
