= Hall and parlor house =

Residential architectural style

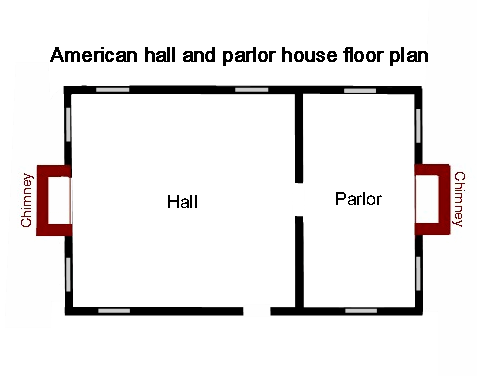
Floor plan of a basic Virginia-style hall-and-parlor house.

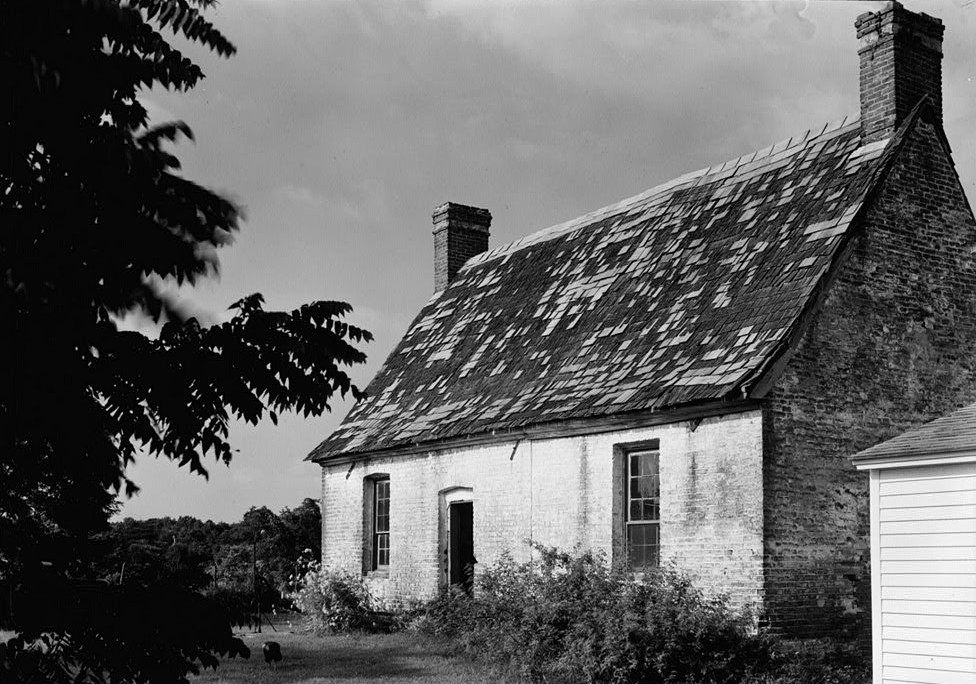
An example from the colonial period of the United States, Resurrection Manor, near Hollywood, Maryland, was built c. 1660 and demolished 2002.

A hall-and-parlor house is a type of two-room vernacular house found in early-modern to 19th century England, as well as in colonial North America. It is presumed to have been the model on which other North American house types have been developed, such as the Cape Cod house, saltbox, and central-passage house, and in turn influenced the somewhat-later I-house. In England it had been a more modest development from the medieval hall house.

== Origins and features ==
The hall-and-parlor style entails a rectangular, two-room configuration. The style began in early-modern England, where it was often a timber-framed structure. Many could not afford a large house; however, putting up a wall in the only room created a smaller area in the rear of the house called a parlor. This was the private room and usually contained a bed. In early examples, the house is one room wide and two deep. The two adjoining rooms are connected by an interior door. An exterior door leads to the hall, the larger of the two rooms and the one in the front of the house. Behind the hall is the parlor. The hall may have been used for cooking, while the parlor was the general living space and bedroom.

In colonial America, hall-and-parlor houses were two rooms wide and one deep. They were often one and a half stories tall, with a steeply pitched side-gabled roof. The style was at one time so ubiquitous that it was known colloquially as the "Virginia style". In the Southern Colonies, there were usually flush or exterior gable-end chimneys on one or both sides of the house. Northern examples often featured a central chimney. The houses were most often of wood-frame construction on a brick or stone foundation, but sometimes the entire structure was masonry. The windows were often asymmetrically placed. Common dimensions for the entire house were from 16 to 20 feet (5 to 6 m) deep and 20 to 40 feet (6 to 12 m) wide. The larger hall was the general-purpose room and, if a loft existed, contained a stairway or ladder to it. The parlor was the smaller of the two rooms and was more private. It was commonly used for sleeping.

The central-passage house, also known as the hall-passage-parlor house, is believed by architectural historians to have developed from the earlier hall-and-parlor house type. In fact, many examples are known where an earlier hall-and-parlor house had an additional wall added inside the larger hall room to form a central-passage house.

== Examples ==
The hall-and-parlor style was common in early-19th-century construction in Williamson County, Tennessee, including the John Pope House, Samuel Crockett House, John Neely House, and John Crafton House.
