= Ronald Rich =

British supporting player

Ronald Rich is a British supporting player best known for his role as Hans, the personal bodyguard of Ernst Stavro Blofeld in the 1967 James Bond film, You Only Live Twice.

== Career ==
Rich has appeared twice in the Doctor Who serial The Time Meddler (1965), where he played 'Gunnar the Giant', a huge Viking warrior. He also appeared in the Doctor Who episode Mission to the Unknown (also 1965). Rich appeared in The Lance Percival Show (1965). He appeared in Doctor in Clover (1965) as a student doctor. Other film appearances include Alfie (1966), alongside Michael Caine.

In You Only Live Twice (1967) Ronald Rich plays Hans, the huge Aryan personal bodyguard of Dr. Blofeld, who remains behind when Blofeld flees from his hideout in a volcano. James Bond and Hans fight on a bridge over a pool full of Piranhas. After a missed punch Bond flips Hans over his shoulder into the pool, remarking "Bon appetit!". Esquire Magazine ranked Hans #41 in the list of James Bond Villains, saying, "As a character, Hans doesn't offer much. As an obstacle, he's terrific. The actor and stuntman Joe Robinson coached Sean Connery in judo for the fight scene, and acted as double for Ronald Rich. Lewis Gilbert directed Rich in both Alfie and You Only Live Twice.

== Filmography ==
Title	Year	Role	Notes
Doctor in Clover	1966	Student Doctor	Uncredited
Alfie	1966	Big Man in Pub	Uncredited
You Only Live Twice	1967	Hans, Blofeld's Bodyguard	

Television shows
Show	Year	Episode	Role	Director	Notes #
The Lance Percival Show	1965	Episode #1.4			
Doctor Who	1965	"The Watcher"	Gunnar the Giant	Douglas Camfield	Uncredited
Doctor Who	1965	"The Meddling Monk"	Gunnar the Giant	Douglas Camfield	
Doctor Who	1965	"Mission to the Unknown"	Trantis	Derek Martinus	Uncredited
The Benny Hill Show	1968	Episode #8.2	Various roles		Credited as Ron Rich
B and B	1968	Roger	The Man		(final appearance)
