= Walter Randall =

British actor and dancer (1929–2006)

- Randall in the Doctor Who serial The Aztecs (1964)
- Born: Walter Frank Fugard; 26 June 1929; Union of South Africa
- Died: 5 May 2006 (aged 76); Richmond, Surrey, England
- Occupations: Actor, dancer, restaurateur

Walter Randall (26 June 1929 – 5 May 2006) was a British dancer turned actor with numerous roles in British television, including parts in The Saint, Out of This World, Yes Minister, The Professionals and Dixon of Dock Green. His film appearances included roles in The Hand (1960) and Tiffany Jones (1973).

He appeared in the Doctor Who story The Aztecs in 1964, and was interviewed for the DVD release in 2002. Five further appearances on the programme followed, the last of which was Planet of the Spiders in 1974. In their positive review of The Crusade, the Radio Times wrote "Walter Randall's El Akir is the most sinister character in the series to date."

In addition to acting, Randall ran a restaurant in Chelsea. He later ran a wine bar and went into partnership with Jon Pertwee, opening a hamburger diner called Pertwee's Take-Away in 1976. It closed five years later.
