= Crockett House =

Crockett House may refer to:

in the United States (by state then city)

- Judge Joseph Crockett House, Hopkinsville, Kentucky, listed on the National Register of Historic Places (NRHP) in Christian County
- John Edward Crockett House, Mulberry, Kentucky, listed on the NRHP in Shelby County
- Joseph Crockett House, Nicholasville, Kentucky, listed on the NRHP in Jessamine County
- Knott Crockett House, Rockland, Maine, listed on the NRHP in Knox County
- Crockett House (Pocomoke City, Maryland), listed on the NRHP in Worcester County
- John Crockett House, Stratham, New Hampshire, listed on the NRHP in Rockingham County
- Andrew Crockett House, Brentwood, Tennessee, listed on the NRHP in Williamson County
- Samuel Crockett House, Brentwood, Tennessee, listed on the NRHP in Williamson County
- Crockett House (Logan, Utah), listed on the NRHP in Cache County
- Crockett Springs Cottage, Piedmont, Virginia, listed on the NRHP in Montgomery County
