= Tales of the TARDIS =

British TV series (2023–2024)

- Genre: Science fiction; Adventure; Drama
- Created by: Russell T Davies
- Showrunner: Russell T Davies
- Written by: Russell T Davies; Pete McTighe; Phil Ford
- Directed by: Joshua M.G. Thomas; Jamie Donoughue
- Starring: Peter Davison; Janet Fielding; Frazer Hines; Wendy Padbury; Colin Baker; Nicola Bryant; Daniel Anthony; Katy Manning; Maureen O'Brien; Peter Purves; Sylvester McCoy; Sophie Aldred; Ncuti Gatwa; Millie Gibson
- Composer: Sam Watts
- Country of origin: United Kingdom
- Original language: English
- No. of series: 1
- No. of episodes: 7

Production
- Executive producers: Jane Tranter; Julie Gardner; Joel Collins; Phil Collinson; Russell T Davies
- Producers: Scott Handcock; Vicki Delow
- Cinematography: Ryan Eddleston; Chas Bain
- Editors: Emily Lawrence; Joseph Keirle; Benjamin Cook
- Running time: 76–111 minutes
- Production companies: BBC Studios; Bad Wolf

Original release
- Network: BBC iPlayer
- Release: 1 November 2023 – 20 June 2024
- Network: BBC Four
- Release: 20 June 2024

Related
- Doctor Who; Whoniverse

Tales of the TARDIS is a companion series to the television series Doctor Who which features re-releases of stories from the show's original run, enclosed by additional material featuring actors reprising their roles. The series is produced by Bad Wolf and BBC Studios Productions, and executive produced by Russell T Davies, Jane Tranter, Julie Gardner, Phil Collinson, and Joel Collins. The series is set within a location known as the Memory TARDIS, which brings people from throughout time and space into itself in order for them to tell stories. The Memory TARDIS uses these stories to power itself.

The series was conceived by Davies, who envisioned it as a way to help newer fans start watching the show's original 1963–1989 television run. Written by Davies, Pete McTighe, and Phil Ford, the first six episodes were released in November 2023. A further episode which recapped the 1975 serial Pyramids of Mars was released in June 2024 to tie into the airing of the 2024 episode "Empire of Death", which featured the return of Pyramids of Mars's main antagonist, Sutekh. Critical response to the series was largely positive. A spin-off novel based on the series was released in 2026.

== Premise and cast ==
=== Premise ===
The story of Tales of the TARDIS is set inside a TARDIS, a time machine featured in Doctor Who. This version is dubbed the Memory TARDIS and was created through memories. The Memory TARDIS uses stories as fuel and thus brings in people from throughout time and space to tell stories of their past. The episodes feature serials from the show's original 1963–1989 television run, which are bookended by new material filmed on the Memory TARDIS set with characters from the show's history. The serials, which were originally broadcast in multiple parts, are edited into an omnibus format for their airing in Tales of the TARDIS.

=== Cast ===
In addition to the cast members from the original Doctor Who stories featured, each episode is bookended by new material featuring several actors reprising their roles from Doctor Who and The Sarah Jane Adventures:

- Peter Davison as the Fifth Doctor
- Janet Fielding as Tegan Jovanka
- Frazer Hines as Jamie McCrimmon
- Wendy Padbury as Zoe Heriot
- Colin Baker as the Sixth Doctor
- Nicola Bryant as Peri Brown
- Daniel Anthony as Clyde Langer
- Katy Manning as Jo Jones
- Maureen O'Brien as Vicki
- Peter Purves as Steven Taylor
- Sylvester McCoy as the Seventh Doctor
- Sophie Aldred as Ace
- Ncuti Gatwa as the Fifteenth Doctor
- Millie Gibson as Ruby Sunday

== Episodes ==
No.	Title	New material directed by	New material written by	Featuring	Original release date
1	Earthshock	Joshua M.G. Thomas	Russell T Davies	Fifth Doctor and Tegan	1 November 2023
2	The Mind Robber	Joshua M.G. Thomas	Pete McTighe	Jamie and Zoe	1 November 2023
3	Vengeance on Varos	Joshua M.G. Thomas	Phil Ford	Sixth Doctor and Peri	1 November 2023
4	The Three Doctors	Joshua M.G. Thomas	Phil Ford	Clyde and Jo	1 November 2023
5	The Time Meddler	Joshua M.G. Thomas	Phil Ford	Vicki and Steven	1 November 2023
6	The Curse of Fenric	Joshua M.G. Thomas	Pete McTighe	Seventh Doctor and Ace	1 November 2023
7	Pyramids of Mars	Jamie Donoughue	Russell T Davies	Fifteenth Doctor and Ruby	20 June 2024

== Production ==
=== Development ===
Tales of the TARDIS was first announced on 30 October 2023. The series was conceived by main series showrunner Russell T Davies to help newer fans access the large number of Doctor Who stories that aired from 1963 to 1989, as the stories he chose would give new fans starting points for the series. He also felt it would help celebrate the show's original run, as Tales of the TARDIS aired during the year of the show's sixtieth anniversary. Davies personally selected the stories featured in the episodes.

Davies wrote the episode that covered the 1982 serial Earthshock, focusing on the death of the character Adric, which Pete McTighe said the original series had never explored. McTighe and Phil Ford also contributed new scenes for the series. McTighe wrote the scenes for two episodes, which Radio Times compared to the shorts that he wrote for Blu-ray re-releases of old Doctor Who stories. When asked in an interview, Davies said that the series was canon to the main Doctor Who television series.

=== Filming and production ===
A photo from the sixth episode featuring the Seventh Doctor (Sylvester McCoy) and Ace (Sophie Aldred) in the Memory TARDIS

New material for the first six episodes was filmed over six days at Bad Wolf Studios from 25 to 30 September 2023. The series is produced by Bad Wolf alongside BBC Studios Productions, with Davies, alongside Jane Tranter, Julie Gardner, Phil Collinson, and Joel Collins, acting as executive producers. The first six episodes were directed by Joshua M.G. Thomas and produced by Scott Handcock, who hoped the series could continue for more episodes in the future.

The Memory TARDIS set was originally created for the series 14 episode "Empire of Death", which had finished filming in July 2023. The episode featured a "remembered TARDIS" that the characters used after antagonist Sutekh captured the main TARDIS. Davies originally intended to have the Memory TARDIS destroyed in the episode, though the idea was scrapped due to being "an SFX sequence too far". He eventually got the idea to re-use the set for Tales of the TARDIS as part of Doctor Who's sixtieth-anniversary celebrations. The Memory TARDIS set features a number of Easter eggs and references to prior stories in the series, with many props from previous episodes used throughout.

== Release and reception ==
The first six episodes were released on 1 November 2023 exclusively on BBC iPlayer, and are only available to watch in the United Kingdom. A seventh episode which recapped the story Pyramids of Mars was released on iPlayer and broadcast on BBC Four on 20 June 2024, two days before the series 14 finale "Empire of Death", which featured the return of Pyramids of Mars's antagonist, Sutekh. This version had updated special effects compared to the original, and contained new material written by Davies, directed by Jamie Donoughue, and produced by Vicki Delow.

James Whitbrook, writing for Gizmodo, positively highlighted the show's emphasis on the series's past, which he felt allowed the show to feel bittersweet about the past while also having a hopeful, optimistic outlook for the future. He praised the focus on the returning characters, stating that "these stories can never end. Each of the Tales of the TARDIS shorts ends with that kind of hopeful reminder." Adi Tantimedh, writing for Bleeding Cool, praised the episode focusing on Pyramids of Mars, which he felt allowed viewers to watch a popular story with a "fresh coat of paint". In Doctor Who and Gay Male Fandom: A Queer(ed) Transmedia Franchise, Mike Stack wrote that the Memory TARDIS's usage of various elements from the series' past was comforting for viewers.

== Novel ==
An anthology novel containing eight stories based on Tales of the TARDIS was written by Beth Axford. The novel was released in 2026. The novel was accompanied by a short story, Nine Minutes Past Four, which was released on the Doctor Who website. The short story features the Fourth and Ninth Doctors shortly following their regenerations and serves as a prequel to the events of the rest of the series.

No.	Title	Featuring	Interludes written by
1	The Red Hatching	Tenth Doctor and Martha	Robert Shearman
2	An Unearthly Bonfire	First Doctor and Susan	Carole Ann Ford and Rob Crane
3	The Moving Mountain	Seventh Doctor and Ace	Sophie Aldred
4	Invasion of the Buffles	Eleventh Doctor and Clara	Miles Taylor
5	The Great Hunt	Fifteenth Doctor and Belinda	Inua Ellams
6	Simulata	Fifth Doctor and Nyssa	Peter Davison
7	The Citrus Cycle Conundrum	Thirteenth Doctor and Yaz	Mandip Gill
8	A Vampire in Crimping	Liz and Jo (Third Doctor in interludes)	Katy Manning
