= Adrienne Hill =

English actress (1937–1997)

- Publicity photo
- Born: 22 July 1937; Plymouth, Devon, England
- Died: 6 October 1997 (aged 60); London, England
- Occupations: Actress; drama teacher
- Notable work: Katarina in Doctor Who; 199 Park Lane
- Spouse: Denis Wrattan (m. 1967, divorced)
- Children: 2

Adrienne Hill (22 July 1937 – 6 October 1997) was an English actress. In 1965, she had brief recurring roles in soap opera 199 Park Lane and as Katarina in science fiction television show Doctor Who. 199 Park Lane was cancelled after 18 episodes; her character in Doctor Who was killed off after just five episodes.

== Acting career ==
In 1965 Hill was cast in the regular role of Sandra Orlando for the BBC soap opera 199 Park Lane, but the series was cancelled within a fortnight, after only 18 episodes on air.

Shortly after, she appeared in the BBC science fiction television series Doctor Who as Katarina, a Trojan handmaiden who became a companion of the Doctor—who at that time was played by William Hartnell. She was cast to replace Maureen O'Brien, whose character Vicki was written out of the series in The Myth Makers, the same serial that introduced Hill's character.

Katarina was the first companion to be killed in the series, appearing in only five episodes over two serials: The Myth Makers and The Daleks' Master Plan. The deletion of several scenes prior to recording meant that of the 93 lines originally scripted for her character only 78 made it into the final programmes with her character's final death scene being the first shots to be recorded. Due to the BBC's wiping policy in the 60s and 70s, two of her five episodes are missing from the BBC's archive. Fellow cast member Peter Purves said of Hill's time on the show that "We all thought she was the permanent new girl, but it was decided that a girl coming from ancient Troy could not cope with the science elements of the show and wouldn't understand all that, so after five episodes, they just junked her, literally."

== Later life ==
In 1967, Hill married Denis Wrattan; they had two children: daughter Samantha (born 1968) and son Benjamin (born 1971). Following her appearance in Doctor Who, Hill acted in several small roles prior to moving to the Netherlands with her husband and subsequently to the United States. After returning to Britain she retrained to be a drama teacher and worked in London. She and Wrattan later divorced.

She participated in the 1985 Children in Need programme along with other Doctor Who actors. Her last known acting role was a library assistant in an episode of City Life (a New Zealand soap opera), which was broadcast in February 1998 after her death.

Her obituary was published in Doctor Who Magazine issue 261, which stated she died of cancer on 6 October 1997.

== Legacy ==
Adrienne Hill’s premature death and brief tenure on Doctor Who left her as a largely absent figure in the show’s history. For decades, she was further obscured by the loss of several episodes from the BBC Archives, particularly those comprising the serial The Daleks' Master Plan.

The recovery of missing episodes from The Daleks' Master Plan in 2004 and again in 2026 allowed audiences to view Hill’s performances more completely, prompting an appreciation of her contribution to the programme. These rediscoveries have helped cement her place in Doctor Who history as a short-lived but memorable companion.
