= John Crafton House =

Historic house in Tennessee, United States

- U.S. National Register of Historic Places
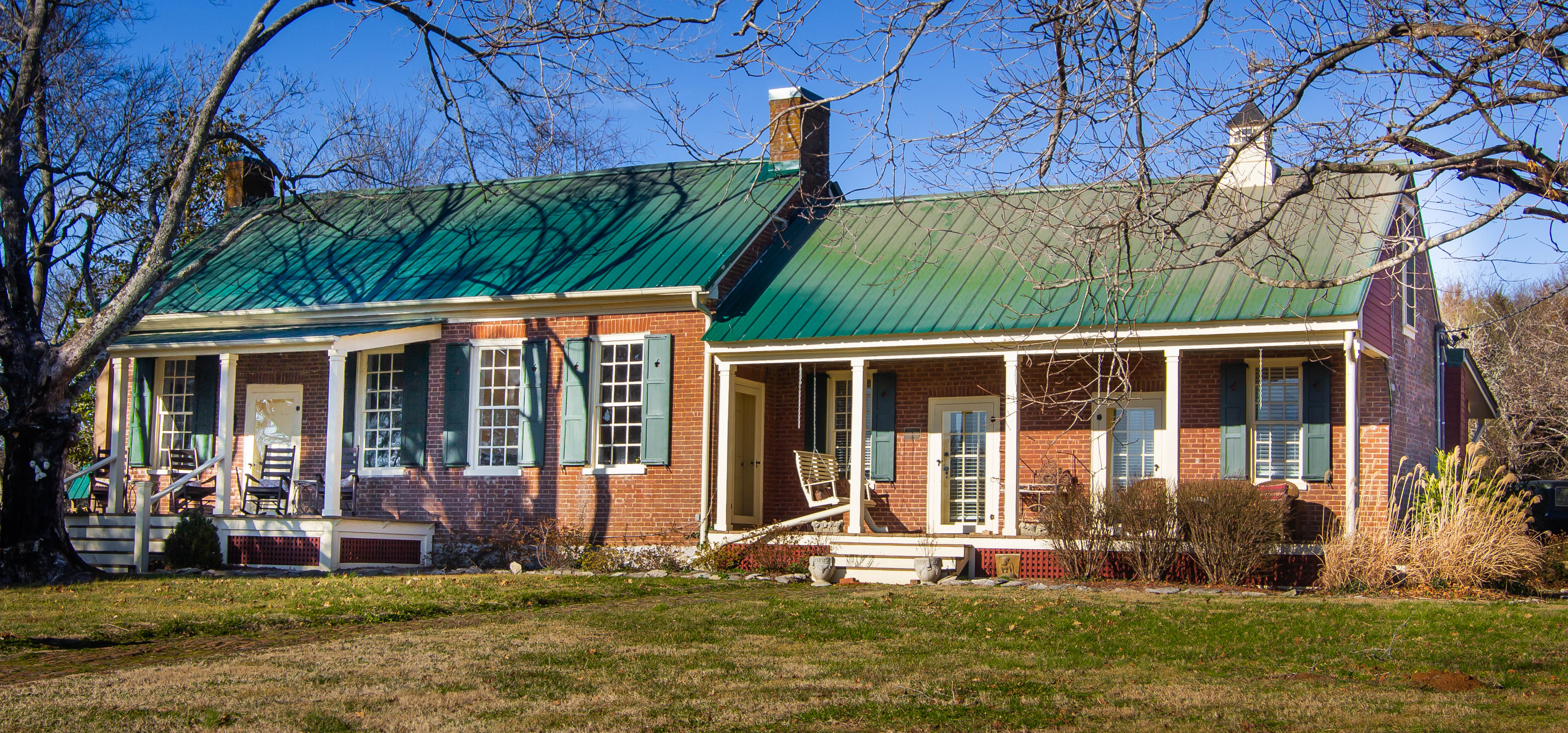

- Location within Tennessee Location within the United States
- Location: N. Chapel Rd. 2 mi. E of Arno Rd., Franklin, Tennessee
- Coordinates: 35°52′44″N 86°46′10″W
- Area: 2.8 acres (1.1 ha)
- Built: c. 1813 and c. 1830
- Architectural style: Hall-parlor plan
- MPS: Williamson County MRA
- NRHP reference No.: 88000347
- Added to NRHP: April 13, 1988

The John Crafton House (also known as Ralroth Farm) is a historic property in Franklin, Tennessee, United States, that was listed on the National Register of Historic Places on April 13, 1988.

It was built in about 1813 and added to c. 1830. It includes a hall-parlor plan and other architecture. When listed the property included one contributing building, one contributing structure and one non-contributing structure on an area of 2.8 acres (1.1 ha).

It is a one-story a one-story, brick house and was built in two stages. The original section was built c. 1813 and includes its original nine panel door, with a main facade built in Flemish bond and side facades laid in five- and seven-course common bond. A wing was added c. 1830.

The property was covered in a 1988 study of Williamson County historical resources.
