= William Joseph Stern =

William Joseph Stern OBE, ARCS, BSc, DIC (1891–1965) was a physicist who worked closely with the early development of the jet engine.

In 1920, Stern reported to the Royal Air Force that there was no future for the turbine engine in aircraft. He based his argument on the extremely low efficiency of existing compressor designs. Stern's paper proved to be so convincing there ceased to be any official interest in gas turbine engines in Britain for several years.

== Authorship ==
He was the author of many scientific papers relating to combustion.

== Order of the British Empire ==
Stern was ethnically German and a close friend of Hugo Junkers. The latter (when Junkers was under Nazi control), and Messerschmitt, made him several very lucrative offers of employment. Despite this, he worked for the British government during the Second World War. After the War he was awarded the Order of the British Empire (Civilian).

== Personal life ==
He was married to Anna Werner of Frankfurt, Germany. One of his daughters, Ann Marguerite, married the British artist and television director John Crockett (1918–1986).
