= Basil Crockett =

British Army officer (1877–1939)

Basil Edwin Crockett
- Born: 14 July 1877; Kensington, Middlesex
- Died: 13 October 1939 (aged 62); Hammersmith, Middlesex
- Military career
- Allegiance: United Kingdom
- Branch: British Army
- Rank: Colonel
- Commands: 11th Battalion, Hampshire Regiment
- Conflicts: Northwest Frontier; Second Boer War; First World War: Battle of Loos
- Awards: Distinguished Service Order & Two Bars; Mentioned in Despatches (8)

Colonel Basil Edwin Crockett DSO & Two Bars (14 July 1877 – 13 October 1939) was a senior officer in the British Army.

== Military career ==
Basil Crockett was born on in 1877 into a military family, the son of Edwin Arthur Brassey Crockett (1834–1915). Educated at Wellington, and Sandhurst, he commissioned into the 17th Lancers before attending Staff College in Poona, India. He served on the Northwest Frontier. Joining a Volunteer Battalion of the Gordon Highlanders during the Second South African War, he was awarded the Queen's South Africa Medal bearing the clasps for South Africa 1901, South Africa 1902, Orange Free State, Transvaal, and Cape Colony. Following the war, he was commissioned a second lieutenant in a regular battalion of the Gordon Highlanders on 23 April 1902.

After a spell with the Leicestershire Regiment, a transfer Crockett made so he could concentrate on his passion of fox hunting, but subsequently regretted. He left the army in 1914, only to immediately rejoin on the outbreak of the First World War, whereupon he was given command of the 11th Battalion, Hampshire Regiment at Farnham; a command Crockett, as essentially a cavalry officer, initially resented.

Far from being a "hands-off" commander, Crockett lived with his men on the front line for much of the war, commanding the section of frontline at Loos. He was mentioned in despatches no less than eight times for gallant conduct, the final time being on 8 November 1918, just three days before the end of the war. He had been awarded the Distinguished Service Order with two Bars by the end of the war.

Crockett had a lifelong passion for the motor car and bought a new car every year of his life from about 1900; this passion was shared by his wife Jessie Shelia Sinclair-Thomson, whom he married in Bombay Cathedral in 1910; for their honeymoon Crockett and his new wife undertook the perilous motor journey from Bombay to Madras, the first time this had been made.

== Family ==
Crockett married, on 27 December 1910 at Bombay Cathedral, Jessie Sheila, twin daughter of Dr William Sinclair Thomson (Physician to Queen Victoria and brother of the notable physician and laryngologist Sir St Clair Thomson) and his wife Jessie Methven, only daughter of George Addison Cox, of Invertrossachs, Perthshire. They lived at Longdown Cottage, Lower Bourne, Farnham.

He died in 1939, somewhat impecunious, having invested his family's money in an ill-advised motor industry venture with an American partner who subsequently disappeared. He was survived by his wife and two sons: Colonel Anthony John Sinclair Crockett OBE, ADC, RM (1916–1999); and John Crockett (1918–1986) artist and TV and film director.
