= Crockett High School =

Crockett High School may refer to:

- Crockett High School (Austin, Texas)
- Crockett High School (Crockett, Texas)
- Crockett High School (Detroit, Michigan) - Detroit Public Schools
- David Crockett High School (Tennessee)
