= The Aztecs (Doctor Who) =

006 – The Aztecs
- Doctor Who serial
- Barbara Wright (Jacqueline Hill), mistaken for Aztec goddess Yetaxa, reluctantly prepares for a human sacrifice. Critics praised the historical accuracy and Hill's performance.

Cast
- Doctor: William Hartnell – First Doctor
- Companions: William Russell – Ian Chesterton; Jacqueline Hill – Barbara Wright; Carole Ann Ford – Susan Foreman
- Others: Keith Pyott – Autloc; John Ringham – Tlotoxl; Ian Cullen – Ixta; Margot Van der Burgh – Cameca; Tom Booth – First Victim; David Anderson – Aztec Captain; Walter Randall – Tonila; André Boulay – Perfect Victim

Production
- Directed by: John Crockett
- Written by: John Lucarotti
- Script editor: David Whitaker
- Produced by: Verity Lambert
- Music by: Richard Rodney Bennett
- Production code: F
- Series: Season 1
- Running time: 4 episodes, 25 minutes each
- First broadcast: 23 May 1964
- Last broadcast: 13 June 1964

Chronology
| ← Preceded by The Keys of Marinus | Followed by → The Sensorites |

The Aztecs is the sixth serial of the British science fiction television series Doctor Who, which was first broadcast on BBC1 in four weekly parts from 23 May to 13 June 1964. It was written by John Lucarotti and directed by John Crockett. In the serial, the First Doctor (William Hartnell), his granddaughter Susan (Carole Ann Ford), and teachers Ian Chesterton (William Russell) and Barbara Wright (Jacqueline Hill) arrive in Mexico during the Aztec empire. Barbara becomes mistaken for the goddess Yetaxa, and accepts the identity in hope of persuading the Aztecs to give up human sacrifice, despite the Doctor's warnings about changing history.

Lucarotti became fascinated by the Aztec civilisation while living in Mexico, largely due to the Aztec tradition of human sacrifice. He wrote the episodes while his other serial, Marco Polo, was in production. Designer Barry Newbery based his set designs on books and documentaries about the Aztecs, though faced difficulty due to the limited information on the civilisation available. Costume designer Daphne Dare used artistic licence with the serial's costumes, due to the limited clothing worn by the Aztecs. The serial premiered with 7.9 million viewers, maintaining audience figures throughout the four weeks. Response for the serial was positive, and it has since been described as one of the show's greatest stories. It later received several print adaptations and home media releases.

== Plot ==
The TARDIS crew arrive in Mexico in the 15th century. With the TARDIS trapped in a tomb, Barbara Wright (Jacqueline Hill) is mistaken for a female reincarnation of the ancient high priest Yetaxa, and assumes her guise and identity. From her new position of power, Barbara sees her chance to bring an end to human sacrifice. She sees the good side of Aztec culture manifested in Autloc (Keith Pyott), the High Priest of Knowledge, and the gruesome side embodied in the High Priest of Sacrifice, Tlotoxl (John Ringham). As a history teacher, she sees how advanced their culture really is and believes that if sacrifice were abolished, they would be spared destruction at the hands of the Spanish. The urgent warnings of the First Doctor (William Hartnell) that Barbara cannot change history fall on deaf ears, much to his fury.

The bloodthirsty Tlotoxl begins to suspect Barbara is not Yetaxa returned, especially because she is trying to ban human sacrifice. He sets a series of elaborate traps for her and her companions. For example, Ian Chesterton (William Russell) has been compelled into the military and fights the strongest warrior, Ixta (Ian Cullen), to prove his ability to command the Aztec forces. Thus Ixta develops a grudge against Ian and is used by Tlotoxl to try to prove that Barbara is not Yetaxa. The Doctor unwittingly tells Ixta how to defeat Ian in combat using a drugging agent, and this battle nearly ends in the Doctor witnessing his friend's death. When this fails to be conclusive, Tlotoxl convinces the subordinate priest Tonila (Walter Randall) to make a poison for Barbara; the death of Barbara following consumption of the poison would prove she is not immortal and therefore not a god. However, Ian silently warns her from his hiding place, and Barbara refuses to drink the poison. She tells Tlotoxl that she is not Yetaxa but warns him not to tell the people.

Susan Foreman (Carole Ann Ford) and the Doctor have meanwhile both become involved in marriage-making scenarios: Susan has transgressed Aztec law by refusing to marry the Perfect Victim (André Boulay), who has been scheduled for sacrifice by Tlotoxl on the day of the next eclipse; while the Doctor, who knows little of Aztec customs, has become accidentally engaged to an Aztec woman named Cameca (Margot Van der Burgh) after they shared a cup of cocoa. Cameca helps the Doctor and Ian find a way to re-enter the tomb by a secret entrance. Ian braves a treacherous tunnel in which he is almost drowned to re-enter the tomb by a secret door and soon tells his friends that they can flee. Despite her efforts, Barbara realises that she cannot change an entire culture, although she does succeed in changing the views of Autloc. Autloc helps Barbara reunite with her friends before exiling himself to the desert to meditate on what remains of his faith. In a pitched battle to gain access to the tomb door, Ian kills Ixta in a fight to the death to protect the TARDIS crew. The Doctor and his companions leave knowing that despite their intervention, history will take its pre-destined course. As they depart, Tlotoxl is very much in control and sacrifices the Perfect Victim to end the naturally occurring eclipse. The Doctor comforts Barbara by telling her she did help Autloc find a better belief system.

== Production ==
=== Conception and writing ===
Writer John Lucarotti was commissioned to write The Aztecs by script editor David Whitaker on 25 February 1964, while another of his stories—the show's fourth serial, Marco Polo—was in production. Having lived in Mexico, Lucarotti was fascinated by the Aztec civilisation. He described them as "a highly civilised and cultured race", and was particularly fascinated by their obsession with human sacrifice. Lucarotti wrote the scripts aboard his boat in Mallorca, delivering the completed scripts on 18 March 1964. John Crockett was assigned to direct the serial due to his knowledge of history, having previously worked on the fourth episode of Marco Polo. Designer Barry Newbery found the serial difficult for research, due to the limited information on the Aztecs at the time. Researching using books provided by the BBC, he designed the tomb door based on the "comic book" style of Aztec design. He had also watched a documentary about Aztec archaeology on ITV, and was concerned that a larger studio would be required for production. Costume designer Daphne Dare used artistic license with her costumes in the serial, since male Aztecs usually only wore brief loincloths and cloaks, while women were often topless.

=== Casting and characters ===
Keith Pyott was chosen for the role of Autloc, the High Priest of the Aztecs, while Ian Cullen and Margot Van der Burgh played Ixta and Cameca, respectively. Cullen recalled that William Hartnell "wasn't the friendliest person, but he was trying to remember all those lines". John Ringham, an old colleague of Crockett, was chosen to play Tlotoxl; for the character, Crockett told Ringham to "make all the children in the country hate you". Crockett's secretary June McMullen suggested Walter Randall for the role of Tonila, having met him at a party. Producer Verity Lambert required Randall to shave his face for the role. Martial arts expert David Anderson, who had previously appeared in Marco Polo, was cast as the Captain of the Guard. Anderson also arranged the fight between Ian and Ixta for the second episode, and acted as William Russell's stunt double in the final episode. Lucarotti used Aztec-sounding names for the characters; for example, the character Ixta was derived from the Aztec city Ixtapalapa.

=== Filming ===
Carole Ann Ford took a two-week holiday during filming; she appeared in pre-filmed inserts for the second and third episodes. These were filmed on 13 April 1964, during production of the previous serial. Silent model and background shots were filmed at Ealing Studios on 14 April. Rehearsals for the first episode ran from 27 to 30 April, and recording took place on 1 May in Lime Grove Studio D. The second and third episodes were recorded on 8 and 15 May, respectively, at the BBC Television Centre. Upon discovering that some of the scenery had been broken up since the recording of the first episode, Crockett quickly rearranged parts from other sets, as well as some plants, to build the set. The final episode was filmed on 22 May in Lime Grove Studio D.

== Reception ==
=== Broadcast and ratings ===
| Episode | Title | Run time | Original release date | UK viewers (millions) | Appreciation Index |
|---|---|---|---|---|---|
| 1 | "The Temple of Evil" | 23:56 | 23 May 1964 | 7.4 | 62 |
| 2 | "The Warriors of Death" | 24:11 | 30 May 1964 | 7.4 | 62 |
| 3 | "The Bride of Sacrifice" | 25:27 | 6 June 1964 | 7.9 | 57 |
| 4 | "The Day of Darkness" | 25:30 | 13 June 1964 | 7.4 | 58 |

The first episode was broadcast on BBC1 on 23 May 1964, and was watched by 7.4 million viewers, maintaining audience figures from the final two episodes of The Keys of Marinus. The second and fourth episodes maintained these figures, while the third episode saw a rise to 7.9 million viewers; the third episode became the first episode of the show to place in the top 20 of the BBC's audience measurement charts. (Note: The measurement for the same period by TAM (Television Audience Measurement) did not include the episode in the top 20, though the disparity between the two measurement systems was frequently debated at the time.) The serial's Appreciation Index dropped slightly across the four episodes: the first two episodes received 62, while the third and fourth received 57 and 58, respectively.

=== Critical response ===
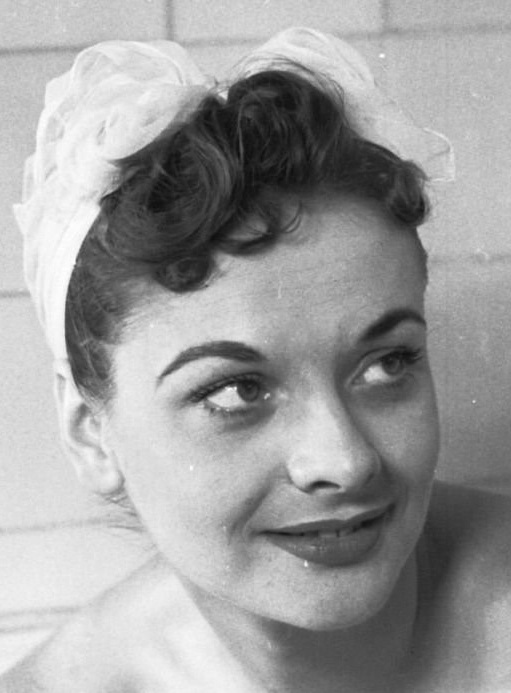
Jacqueline Hill (pictured in 1953) was praised for her portrayal of Barbara in The Aztecs.

The Aztecs received positive reviews. After the broadcast of the first episode, Television Today's Bill Edmunds praised the villainous nature of the characters Tlotoxl and Ixta, but felt that Barbara should have "a chance to look beautiful instead of worried". Edmunds also praised Newbery's design work, noting distinct accuracy in the sets. Following the second episode, Bob Leeson of the Daily Worker felt that the serial had "charm", applauding the "painstaking attempts for historical accuracy" and noting a "much tighter plot" than previous serials. The third episode was the subject of a BBC Audience Research Report in July 1964, in which a panel of 225 viewers deemed a "falling-off of interest" in the show; many viewers preferred the show's "earlier space-time encounters".

Retrospective reviews of the serial were also positive. In 1986, Tim Munro of Star Begotten considered the serial "one of the shining jewels of the Hartnell era" and of the entire classic series to date, praising Lucarotti's writing and characters, especially of the Doctor, considering the story one of his best. In The Discontinuity Guide (1995), Paul Cornell, Martin Day, and Keith Topping described the serial as a "lyrical piece of BBC costume drama and a gem to cherish". In The Television Companion (1998), David J. Howe and Stephen James Walker felt that, while it lacks the epic nature of Marco Polo, The Aztecs is a "fascinating and compelling depiction of the Aztec civilisation", praising Lucarotti's characterisation. In A Critical History of Doctor Who (1999), John Kenneth Muir called The Aztecs "perhaps the best-written of Doctor Who's first-year serials", and Lucarotti's script as "among the best written and best executed stories" of the classic series; he praised the characterisation, tension, and philosophical nature of the script, as well as the central role of Barbara and the performances of Hill, Russell, and Ringham.

In 2008, Radio Times reviewer Mark Braxton called The Aztecs one of the best Doctor Who adventures, highlighting Barbara's dilemma about changing history, the art direction, and the "sense of impending tragedy"; he noted minor issues, such as the backdrops and unconvincing fight scenes. In 2011, Christopher Bahn of The A.V. Club described The Aztecs as "a classical tragedy infused with just enough hope toward the end to keep it from being unbearably bleak" and discussed the inability of changing history and the Doctor's only romantic entanglement in the classic series, which he called "sweet and funny". In 2013, Ian Berriman of SFX described the serial as "Jacqueline Hill's finest hour", but felt that "the show is stolen by John Ringham as Tlotoxl". Though mostly positive, Berriman felt that some of the education content was forced and "it's a shame that much of the dialogue is so fustily formal". Ian Jane of DVDTalk praised Hill's portrayal of Barbara, though questioned the character's motivations. Digital Spy's Morgan Jeffrey named it the tenth best Doctor Who story, praising the script, performances and emotional impact of the serial. Jeffrey summarised the serial as "quite simply 100 minutes of sensational drama – it's William Hartnell's finest hour on Doctor Who and one of the show's very best offerings".

== Commercial releases ==
=== In print ===
The Aztecs
- Author: John Lucarotti
- Cover artist: Nick Spender
- Series: Doctor Who book: Target novelisations
- Release number: 88
- Publisher: Target Books
- Publication date: 21 June 1984
- ISBN: 0-426-19588-4

A novelisation of this serial, written by John Lucarotti, was published by Target Books on 21 June 1984, with artwork by Nick Spender; for the paperback reissue by Virgin Books in September 1992, the cover was designed by Andrew Skilleter. An audiobook reading of the novelisation, narrated by William Russell, was published by AudioGO in August 2012.

=== Home media ===
The serial was released on VHS on 2 November 1992, reusing the art by Skilleter, and on DVD in October 2002. A special edition DVD was released in March 2013, featuring additional special features, including audio commentary, interviews with the original cast and the surviving third episode of Galaxy 4 ("Airlock") complete with an abridged 40-minute reconstruction of the other three missing episodes. The serial was also included as part of The Doctors Revisited 1–4, alongside a documentary on the First Doctor. An action figure of Tlotoxl was released by Harlequin Miniatures in 1999. The Aztecs was added to BBC iPlayer on 1 November 2023 alongside most other serials.

== Bibliography ==
- Ainsworth, John, ed. (2016). "Inside the Spaceship, Marco Polo, The Keys of Marinus and The Aztecs". Doctor Who: The Complete History. 2 (32). London: Panini Comics, Hachette Partworks. ISSN 2057-6048.
- Cornell, Paul; Day, Martin; Topping, Keith (1995). The Discontinuity Guide. London: Virgin Books. ISBN 0-426-20442-5.
- Howe, David J.; Walker, Stephen James (1998). Doctor Who: The Television Companion: Volume 1 (2021 ed.). London: BBC Books. ISBN 978-1-845-83156-1.
- Muir, John Kenneth (1999). A Critical History of Doctor Who on Television. Jefferson, North Carolina: McFarland & Company. ISBN 978-0-786-40442-1.
- Munro, Tim (Winter 1986). "'The Aztecs' – A Forgotten Classic". Star Begotten (1). Staraker: 32–38.
