= Linda Crockett =

American author and teacher

- Born: Hamilton, Ontario, Canada
- Occupation: Novelist
- Writing career
- Language: English

Linda Crockett (born in Hamilton, Ontario, Canada), is an American author and teacher, best known for her horror, romance, and psychological thrillers. Linda Crockett published over a dozen books which were translated into as many languages, under the pen names Linda Crockett, Linda Crockett Gray, Linda C. Gray, and Christina Crockett. First published by Playboy Paperbacks in 1979, Linda went on to write four Harlequin "Super-romances", making history by introducing the first disabled leading man ever to appear in a Harlequin romance novel.

Due to injuries from a car accident in 1990, Linda was unable to continue consistently writing until she recovered. She is currently a teacher of Critical Thinking in one of the oldest high schools in St. Petersburg, Florida.

== Bibliography ==
- Published under "Linda Crocket":

Carousel (ISBN 0-8125-0830-0)
Publisher: Tor Books; Reprint edition (May, 1995)
ISBN 0-8125-0830-0
Sandman
Publisher: Tor Books (October, 1990)
ISBN 0-8125-1878-0

- Published under "Linda C. Gray":

Fortune's Fugitive
Publisher: Playboy Paperbacks (December 1, 1979)
ISBN 0-87216-577-9
Satyr
Publisher: Playboy Paperbacks (July 1, 1981)
ISBN 0-87216-849-2

- Published under "Linda C. Gray":

Scryer
Publisher: Tom Doherty Assoc Llc (March, 1987)
ISBN 0-8125-1872-1
Tangerine
Publisher: Tor Books (February, 1988)
ISBN 0-8125-1876-4
Mama's Boy
Publisher: Onyx Books (August, 1989)
ISBN 0-451-40151-4
Siren
Publisher: Tor Books; Reissue edition (January, 1989)
Reprint of original publication: Avon 1982
ISBN 0-8125-1838-1
Dark Window
Publisher: New American Library (Mm) (March, 1991)
ISBN 0-451-16982-4
Safelight
Publisher: Signet Books (December, 1992)
ISBN 0-451-17317-1

- Harlequin SuperRomances, published under "Christina Crockett":

To Touch a Dream
Publisher: Harlequin (February 1, 1983)
ISBN 0-373-70055-5
A Moment of Magic
Publisher: Harlequin (January 1, 1984)
ISBN 0-373-70103-9
Song of the Seabird
Publisher: Harlequin (December 1, 1984)
ISBN 0-373-70146-2
Windward Passage
Publisher: Harlequin (June 1, 1985)
ISBN 0-373-70171-3

== See also ==
- List of horror fiction authors
