= Ingram Crockett =

American poet and journalist (1856–1936)

- Born: February 10, 1856; Henderson, Kentucky, U.S.
- Died: October 5, 1936 (aged 80)
- Occupations: Poet; journalist
- Spouse: Mary Cameron Stites (m. 1887)
- Parent(s): John W. Henderson; Louisa M. Ingram

Ingram Crockett (February 10, 1856 – October 5, 1936) was an American poet and journalist.

Ingram Crockett was born on February 10, 1856, in Henderson, Kentucky. He is son of John W. Henderson, a member of the Confederate Congress in Kentucky, and Louisa M. Ingram. Educated at public schools in Henderson, Crockett never went to college. On May 17, 1887, he married Mary Cameron Stites (1864–1955) and continued to play a prominent part in the business and public affairs of Henderson. With the exception of A brother of Christ, a novel about Kentucky Christadelphians, Crockett's literary output for magazines and in published collections was poetical. "One does not have to travel far in any direction today in order to find many persons declaring that Ingram Crockett is the finest poet living in the state today".

He and his wife were buried in Fernwood Cemetery, Henderson.

== Works ==
- (ed. with Charles J, O'Malley), Ye Wassail Bowie, 1888
- The port of pleasant dreams, 1892
- Rhoda, an Easter Idyll
- Beneath Blue Skies and Gray, 1900
- A Year Book of Kentucky Woods and Fields, 1901.
- A brother of Christ: a tale of western Kentucky, 1905
- The Magic of the Woods and other poems, 1908
- The greeting and goodbye of the birds, 1912
- Betchworth and some other lyrics, 1928
