= Crockett Lake =

- Location within Washington (state) Location within the United States
- Location: Island County, Washington
- Coordinates: 48.1670570°N 122.6622803°W
- Type: lake
- Surface elevation: 0 feet (0 m)

Crockett Lake is a lake in Island County, Washington at an elevation of 0 feet (0 m).

The Crockett family homesteaded the site in the 1850s, and gave the lake their name.

== See also ==
- List of lakes in Washington
