= 199 Park Lane =

1965 British TV soap opera

- Genre: Soap opera
- Created by: William Fairchild
- Starring: Derek Bond; Philip Bond; Margot Boyd; Leonard Cracknell; Isabel Dean; Adrienne Hill
- Country of origin: United Kingdom
- Original language: English
- No. of series: 1
- No. of episodes: 18

Production
- Running time: 30 minutes

Original release
- Network: BBC1
- Release: 3 August – 1 October 1965

199 Park Lane is a British soap opera that aired on BBC1 in 1965. Broadcast twice a week, the series was set in a luxury block of flats in London.

A total of eighteen episodes were broadcast, the first two with the titles "The New Tenant" and "Decision". The entire series was later wiped by the BBC and no episodes survive in the archives.

== Example cast ==
The cast for the first episode was:

- Philip Bond as Tony Ashman
- Geoffrey Toone as Baines
- Jerold Wells as Harry
- Caroline Hunt as Claire Bell
- Derek Bond as Lord Caister
- Ellen McIntosh as Anne Faulkner
- Margot Boyd as woman in train
- Lionel Hamilton as man in train
- Edwin Richfield as Ben Graham
- Isabel Dean as Stella Graham
- Leonard Cracknell as Derek Farrow
- Hugh Morton as Mr. Farrow
- Eileen Peel as Mrs. Farrow
- Brenda Kaye as Kate Harvester
- Frederick Piper as Prescott
