= Ian Crockatt =

Scottish poet and translator

Ian Crockatt (born 1949) is a Scottish poet and translator. He was born in Perth, Scotland and now lives in Aberdeenshire. He has published several volumes of poetry including Flood Alert (Chapman, 1996), Original Myths (Cruachan, 2000; shortlisted for the Scottish Book of the Year Award), and The Lyrical Beast (Salix, 2004). His recent work Skald (Koo Press, 2009) explores the forms of Old Norse skaldic poetry.

As a translator, Crockatt won the Schlegel-Tieck Prize for his translation of Rainer Maria Rilke's poetry, published in 2012 under the title Pure Contradiction. He is pursuing a PhD at Aberdeen University's Centre for Scandinavian Studies; his doctoral thesis is on translating skaldic verse from the Orkneyinga Saga.
