= USS Crockett =

Two ships of the United States Navy have been named Crockett, presumably after counties in Tennessee and Texas.

- USS Crockett (APA-148) was launched 28 November 1944.
- USS Crockett (PG-88) was stricken from the Naval Register on 15 December 1976.
