= Samuel Crockett House =

Historic house in Tennessee, United States

- U.S. National Register of Historic Places
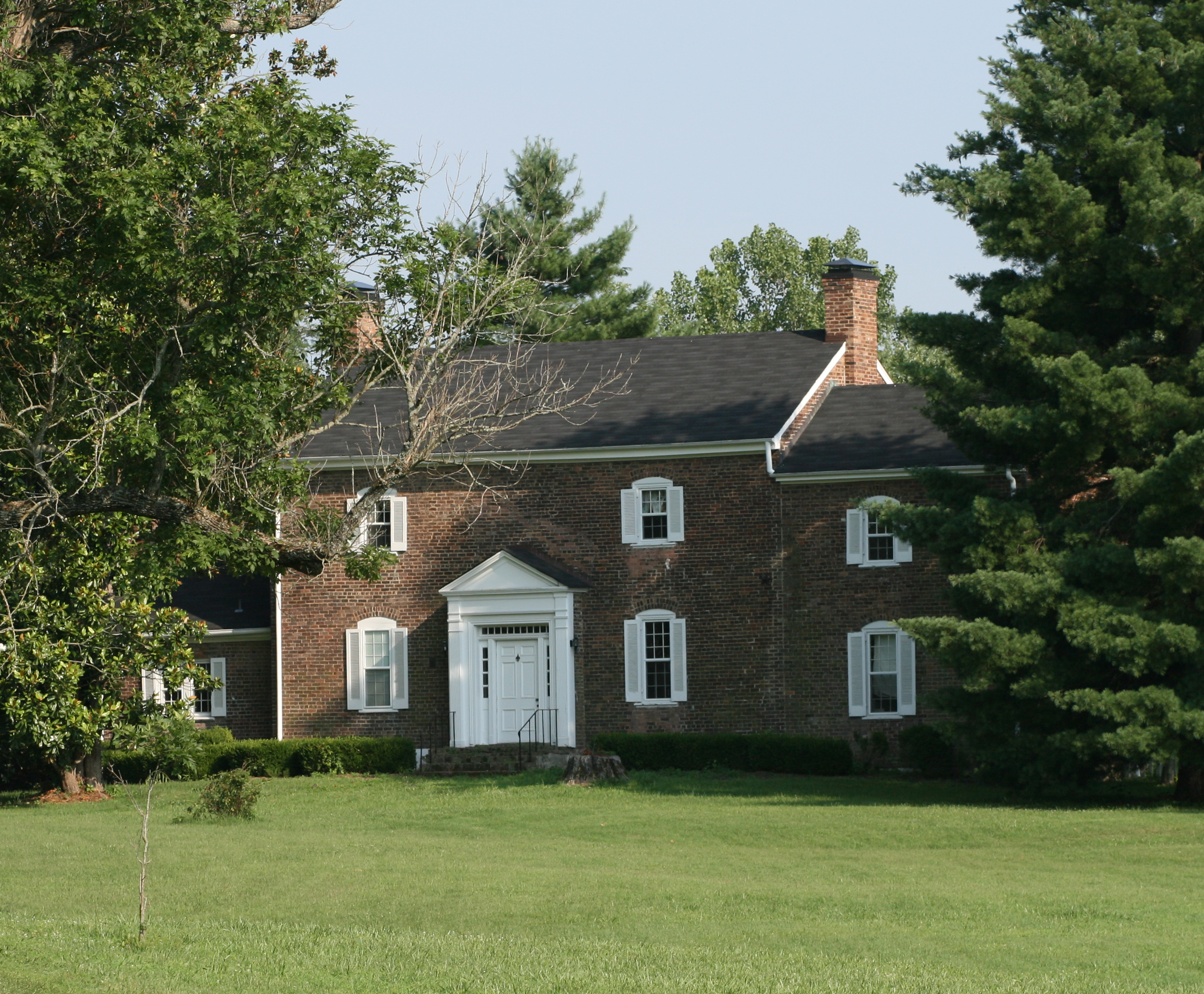
- Samuel Crockett House, known as Forge Seat

- Location within Tennessee Location within the United States
- Location: Crockett Rd. and Wilson Pike, Brentwood, Tennessee
- Coordinates: 35°58′30″N 86°46′30″W
- Area: 18.5 acres (7.5 ha)
- Built: c. 1808, c. 1810 and c. 1830
- Architectural style: Hall-parlor plan
- MPS: Williamson County MRA
- NRHP reference No.: 88000296
- Added to NRHP: April 14, 1988

The Samuel Crockett House, also known as Forge Seat, is a property in Brentwood, Tennessee, United States, that was listed on the National Register of Historic Places in 1988. It was home of Samuel Crockett, son of Andrew Crockett, whose home is also NRHP-listed as Andrew Crockett House. When listed the property included five contributing buildings, one non-contributing building, and one non-contributing structure, on an area of 18.5 acres (7.5 ha).

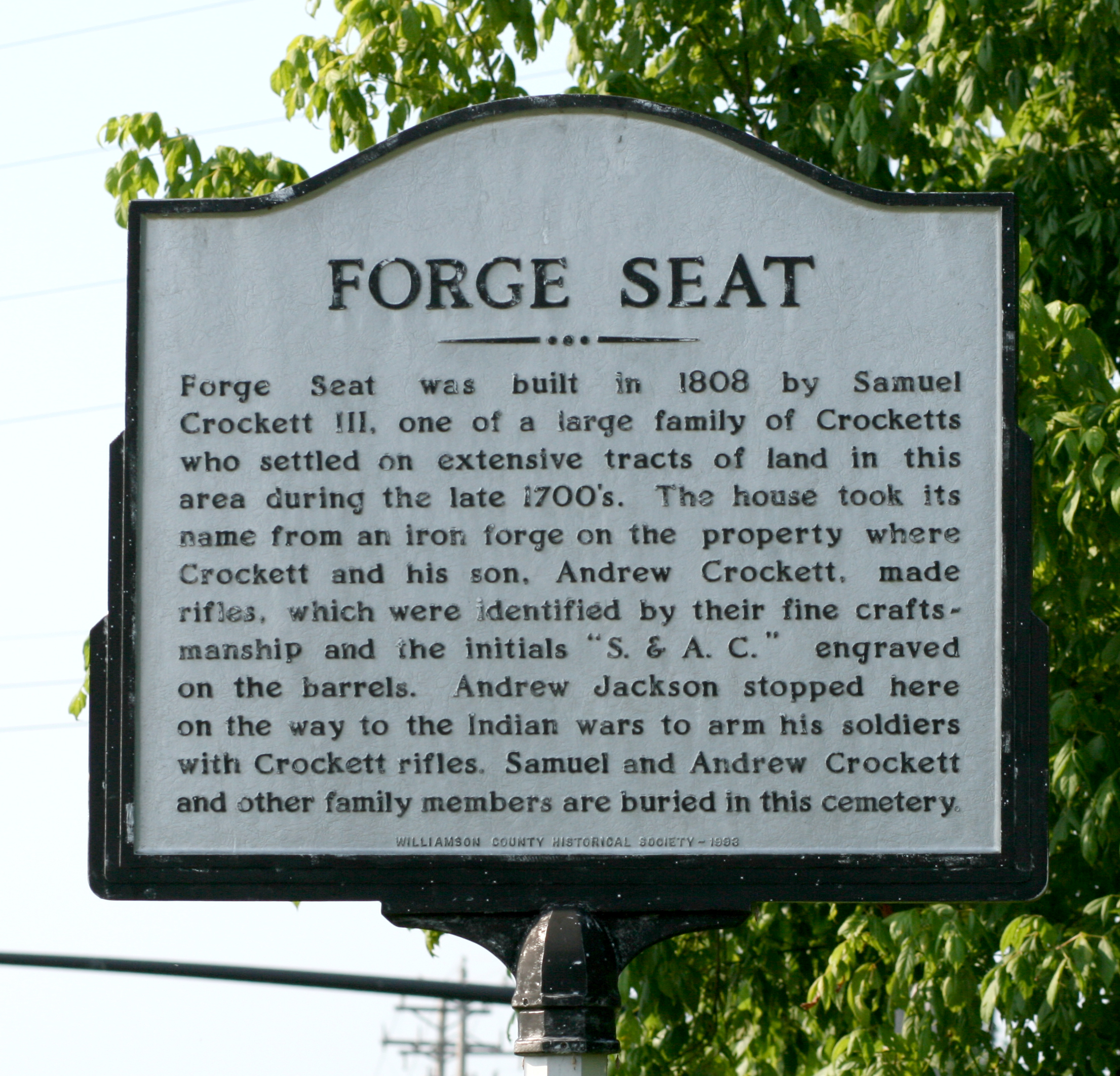
Williamson County Historical Society Marker

Andrew Crockett, Samuel's father, received a 640-acre (260 ha) grant for Revolutionary War services. He built his first log home on the southeast side of what is now Brentwood in 1799. His son, Samuel Crockett built a two-story brick home nearby, which was completed ca. 1808. The home became known as "Forge Seat" because of the iron forge located on the property. Samuel Crockett and his son, Andrew, made iron implements here and specialized in rifle making. Crockett's rifles "were identified by their fine craftsmanship and the initials 'S. & A. C.' engraved on the barrels". On his way to New Orleans and the War of 1812, Andrew Jackson stopped here and purchased rifles to arm his soldiers. It is also said that Davy Crockett stopped on his way to Texas as well.

Samuel and Andrew Crockett and other family members are buried in the cemetery nearby.

The log building containing the forge and the seat of the stone forge itself still remain. There has been no other early blacksmith or forge site found in the county.
