= Alvin Crockett =

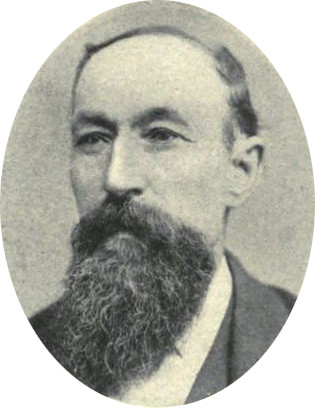
- Born: October 19, 1831; Vinalhaven, Maine
- Died: July 9, 1902 (aged 70); Logan, Utah
- Known for: First mayor of Logan, Utah

Alvin Crockett (October 19, 1831 – July 9, 1902) was the first mayor of Logan, Utah and later served for 15 years as sheriff of Cache County, Utah.

Crockett was born on the Fox Islands of Maine. His family joined the Church of Jesus Christ of Latter-day Saints while he was a young child and later emigrated to Nauvoo and then Utah. He settled in Payson, Utah shortly after his marriage in 1851. He moved to Logan, Utah in 1861. He was a member of the Cache Stake High Council of The Church of Jesus Christ of Latter-day Saints from 1863 until at least 1901.

== Sources ==
- Andrew Jenson. LDS Biographical Encyclopedia. Vol. 1, p. 418-419.
