= Vicki (Doctor Who) =

Fictional character in the TV series Doctor Who

- Doctor Who character
- Maureen O'Brien as Vicki
- First appearance: The Rescue (1965)
- Last appearance: Tales of the TARDIS (2023)
- Portrayed by: Maureen O'Brien
- Duration: 1965, 2023

In-universe information
- Full name: Vicki Pallister
- Species: Human
- Affiliation: First Doctor
- Home: Earth
- Home era: 25th century

Vicki is a fictional character played by Maureen O'Brien in the long-running British science fiction television series Doctor Who. An orphan from the 25th century, she was a companion of the First Doctor and a regular in the programme in Seasons 2 and 3 in 1965. Her last name was never revealed during the series. Vicki appeared in 9 stories (38 episodes).

== Appearances ==
Vicki first appears in the serial The Rescue (1965), a survivor of a spaceship crash on the planet Dido. She and fellow survivor Bennett are being menaced by the monstrous Koquillion when she meets the Doctor (William Hartnell) and his companions Ian (William Russell) and Barbara (Jacqueline Hill). They discover that Koquillion is actually Bennett, who had killed the crew of the spaceship, including Vicki's father. Still coping with his recent parting from his granddaughter Susan at the end of The Dalek Invasion of Earth, the Doctor invites the teenage girl to join the TARDIS crew.

Vicki is the one who persuades the Doctor to let Ian and Barbara use a Dalek time machine to return to their own time in The Chase. At the beginning of The Time Meddler, it is revealed that the refugee Steven Taylor (Peter Purves) had stowed away on the TARDIS at the end of The Chase, and he accompanies Vicki and the Doctor.

Vicki eventually falls in love with the warrior Troilus when the TARDIS lands during the siege of Troy (The Myth Makers). After making sure that Steven and the Doctor will be all right without her, she decides to remain with Troilus, eventually passing into legend as Cressida, the name given to her by King Priam. She ensures that the Trojan girl Katarina (Adrienne Hill) enters the TARDIS in her place.

An older Vicki, still played by O'Brien, returns in an episode of the 60th Anniversary spin-off Tales of the TARDIS, with Peter Purves as Steven. Drawn from their respective timelines into a Memory Tardis, they recall the events of The Time Meddler and share details of their lives after leaving the First Doctor. Vicki and Troilus became olive farmers in Troy, having children and grandchildren. The episode ends with the off-screen voice of William Hartnell, suggesting the Doctor has joined them.

=== Other media ===
Vicki appears in several spin-off short stories in the BBC Short Trips range. In "Apocrypha Bipedium" by Ian Potter, the Eighth Doctor – having convinced her that he is a later Doctor rather than a younger one as Vicki first believed due to her ignorance of Regeneration – advises her and Troilus to move to Cornwall to avoid the tragic conclusion to their story as related by William Shakespeare.

The Big Finish audio story Frostfire (The Companion Chronicles, 2007) is told by an older Vicki living in Carthage, where she and Troilus traveled with Aeneas, had children and settled, although it is shown that she now regrets her decision to stay in Troy. Frostfire portrays Vicki as somewhat lonely and isolated, conversing with a somewhat malevolent living cinder (a spark of the phoenix) because it is the only being with whom she can discuss her travels with the Doctor. Vicki also appears in The Suffering (2010) alongside Steven and The Rocket Men (The Companion Chronicles, 2011) alongside Ian and Barbara. She also featured in the release titled The Dark Planet, which is an adaptation of an unmade story submitted for season two. Maureen O'Brien provided narration for these stories, aside from The Rocket Men, which was read by Russell. Vicki also appears with Steven and the Fifth Doctor in the audio The Secret History, when the Fifth Doctor swaps places with the First before a crucial adventure as part of a complex plan by the Monk.

Vicki appears in two First Doctor novels of the Virgin Missing Adventures range: The Plotters by Gareth Roberts (1996) alongside Ian and Barbara, and The Empire of Glass by Andy Lane (1995) alongside Steven and Irving Braxiatel. She appears with Ian and Barbara in the Past Doctor Adventures novels Byzantium! by Keith Topping (2001) and The Eleventh Tiger by David A. McIntee (2004). The latter states that her full name is Vicki Pallister.

== Development ==
Vicki was the replacement for the Doctor's granddaughter, Susan (Carole Ann Ford), who was the first companion to leave Doctor Who; Ford was displeased with the lack of her character's development. In contrast to Susan, Vicki was conceived as an Earth orphan from the future; the production team considered many names from here, some of them odd like "Luckky" and "Tanni". Maureen O'Brien had just come out of drama school when she was cast; it was her first television acting job. Doctor Who creator Sydney Newman told O'Brien that they were considering having her cut her hair and dye it black. O'Brien refused, saying, "Why don't you just get Carole Ann Ford back?"

== Reception ==
Reviewing The Time Meddler, Christopher Bahn of The A.V. Club wrote that Vicki was "more than just a replacement of Susan but an improvement on her", due to O'Brien being a "much more engaging and lively actress". Bahn also felt that Vicki was a "more effective conversational foil" to Steven than Susan would have been. Radio Times reviewer Mark Braxton praised the way Vicki takes control in The Space Museum, comparing her to later companion Sarah Jane Smith (Elisabeth Sladen). Despite this, Braxton felt that the character was "badly underused", though he wrote positively of how her departure was handled, and Braxton's colleague Patrick Mulkern wrote that Vicki showed "promise" in her first story but was "short-changed by subsequent writers".
