= John Neely House =

Historic house in Tennessee, United States

- U.S. National Register of Historic Places
- Location within Tennessee Location within the United States
- Location: Sedberry Road 2 mi. south of W. Harpeth Road, Thompsons Station, Tennessee
- Coordinates: 35°49′7″N 86°55′0″W
- Area: 1.1 acres (0.45 ha)
- Built: c. 1810 and c. 1900
- Architectural style: Hall-parlor
- MPS: Williamson County MRA
- NRHP reference No.: 88000366
- Added to NRHP: April 13, 1988

The John Neely House is a property in Thompsons Station, Tennessee dating from c. 1810 that was listed on the National Register of Historic Places in 1988. The property has also been known as Hilltop Manor.

The NRHP eligibility of the property was addressed in a 1988 study of Williamson County historical resources.
