= John Crockett (director) =

English director (1918–1986)

- Born: John Angus Basil Crockett; 31 January 1918; Hampshire, England
- Died: 11 October 1986 (aged 68); Newlyn, Cornwall, England
- Occupation: Director
- Spouse: Anne Stern (m. 1940)
- Children: 8, including Antony
- Father: Basil Crockett
- Relatives: William Joseph Stern (father-in-law)

John Angus Basil Crockett (31 January 1918 – 11 October 1986) was a stage and television director.

He directed the Doctor Who story The Aztecs in 1964, one of the most highly regarded of the black and white stories. In the 2002 DVD release the actor John Ringham was effusive in his praise for Crockett. He also directed episode 4 of Marco Polo, which is entitled "The Wall of Lies".

== Education and training ==
Crockett was the second son of Colonel Basil Crockett DSO. He was educated at Bryanston School. In 1938, he was a student of art at Goldsmiths' College, New Cross, London, England. He also attended the Slade School to study theatre design, along with classes at the London Theatre Studio. In 1940, he married Anne Marguerite Stern. She was the first daughter of Dr. William Joseph Stern OBE, an eminent physicist.

== Professional theatre ==
In 1944, partnered with his wife, he established a theatre company called The Compass Players. It was a travelling troupe that intended to perform a repertoire of high quality to audiences who would not normally have access to it. Their base was Crockett's own home, an old house on an estate in Gloucestershire. Crockett resigned as artistic director in 1951 and the company formally closed in the following year. In the late 1950s and early 1960s, he produced a number of plays for both the Birmingham and Dundee Repertory Theatres.

From September 1969 until December 1976, he was a teacher of Art and Drama at Downside School, Somerset, England, where one of his sons was educated.

== Personal life ==
The Crocketts were parents to eight children. The years of birth of those are from 1954 to 1966 (Note: These are not definitive but are based on what would appear to be reasonable deduction.) and they include a daughter, Mary, and a son, Antony. They were resident in Gloucestershire, then Somerset, before retiring to West Cornwall.

Devoutly Catholic, Crockett and his wife Anne were oblates of Prinknash Abbey where both are buried.

== Book ==
- Plays Without Theatres: Recollections of the Compass Players Travelling Theatre, 1944-52, edited by Pamela Dellar - Highgate Publications (Beverley) Ltd (8 Oct 1989) ISBN 978-0-948929-27-4.
