= Maureen O'Brien =

English actress (born 1943)

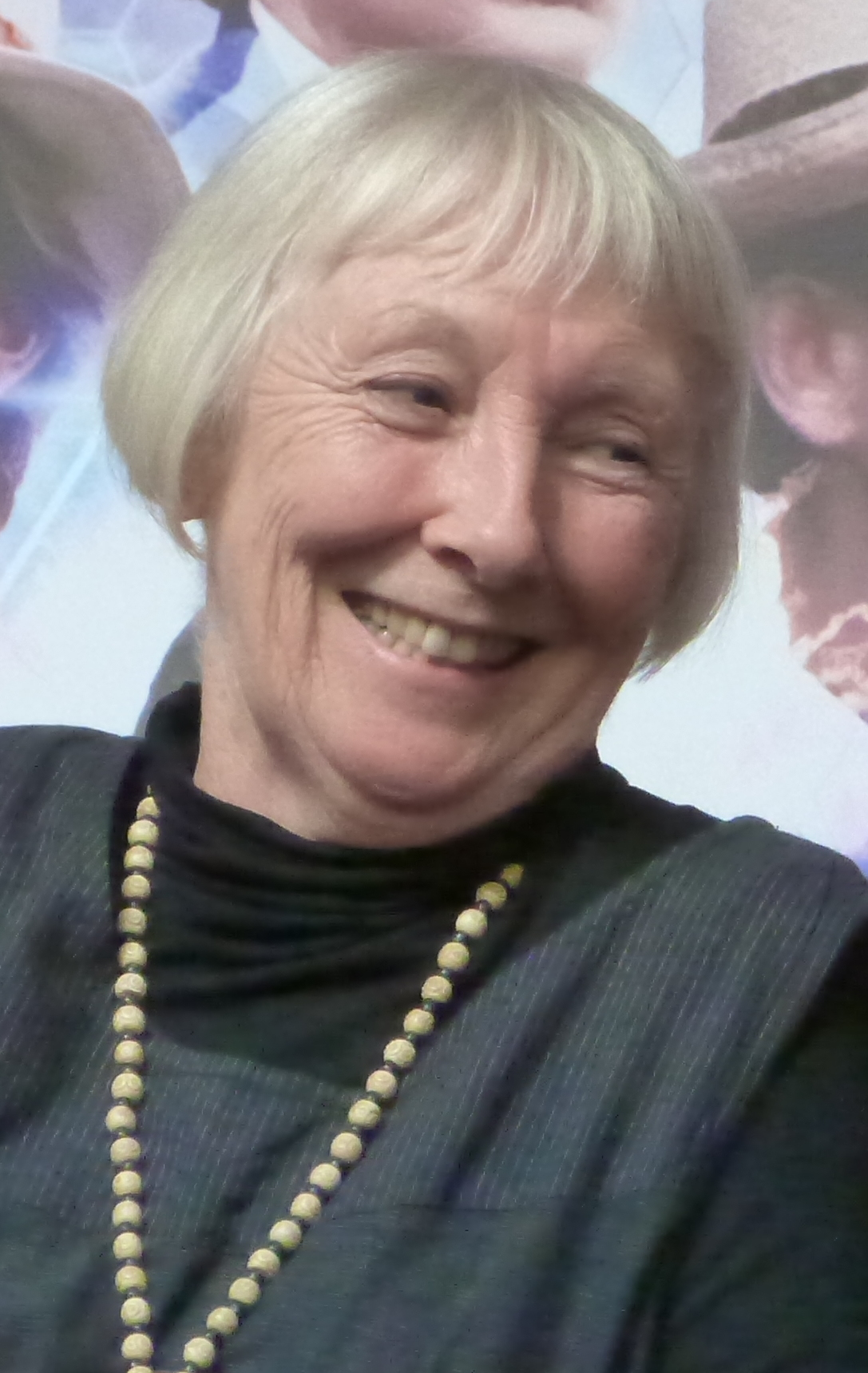
- O'Brien in 2014
- Born: 29 June 1943 (age 83); Liverpool, Lancashire, England
- Education: Central School of Speech and Drama
- Occupations: Actress; author
- Years active: 1965–present
- Known for: Doctor Who
- Spouse: Michael Moulds (m. 1968)

Maureen O'Brien (born 29 June 1943) is an English actress and author best known for playing the role of Vicki in the BBC science fiction television series Doctor Who, although she has appeared in many other television programmes.

== Early life ==
O'Brien was born in Liverpool. She attended Notre Dame School, as well as the Central School of Speech and Drama in London.

== Career ==
After graduating in 1964, O'Brien returned to Liverpool to become a founder member of the Everyman Theatre. As well as acting, she worked as an assistant floor manager for the company.

She played the part of Vicki in 38 episodes of Doctor Who from 2 January to 6 November 1965, starring alongside the original Doctor, William Hartnell. She has reprised the role in several Big Finish Productions Doctor Who audio plays. In 2022, 57 years after playing the role on screen, she appeared as Vicki in a short webisode made to promote the release of her first season on Blu-ray. She reprised the role again in the series Tales of the TARDIS.

After leaving Doctor Who O'Brien found it difficult to find acting work on television, and worked as a supply teacher. Her next role was in the theatre, where she appeared in an Oxford Playhouse production of Volpone with Leo McKern and Leonard Rossiter.

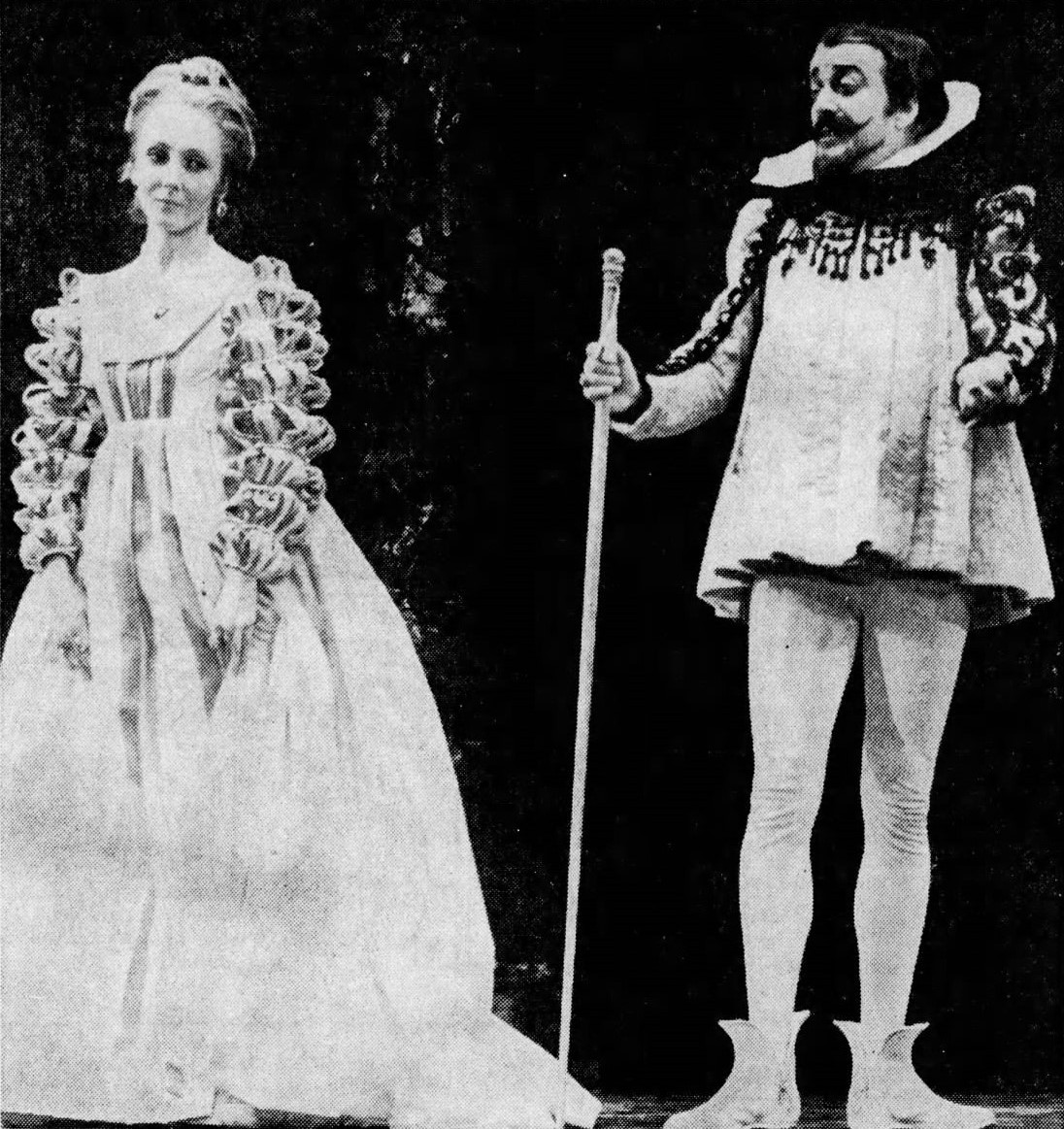
O'Brien as Portia in a scene from The Merchant of Venice with Eric Donkin, in 1970

In 1970 she played Imogen and Portia in productions of Cymbeline and The Merchant of Venice respectively, both at the Stratford Festival. In 1971 she directed a production of Brecht's The Caucasian Chalk Circle at Carleton University.

She had recurring roles as Morgan in The Legend of King Arthur (1979) and as unit general manager Elizabeth Straker in the second season of Casualty (1987). She made guest appearances in The Duchess of Duke Street ("Trouble and Strife") (1976), Taggart ("Forbidden Fruit") (1994), Cracker ("The Big Crunch") (1994), A Touch of Frost ("Private Lives") (1999) and Heartbeat. In 1997 she appeared as Kirsten Holiday in "Jack in the Box", episode two of Jonathan Creek.

In 1974, she played Celia in "Panic", an episode of the BBC Radio series The World of Daphne du Maurier. The 1980s saw her teaching acting workshops in the USA. She also made a rare film appearance in the comedy She'll Be Wearing Pink Pyjamas in 1985, opposite Julie Walters. She received the Time Out Critic's Choice award for her production of Mike English's Getting In in 1986.

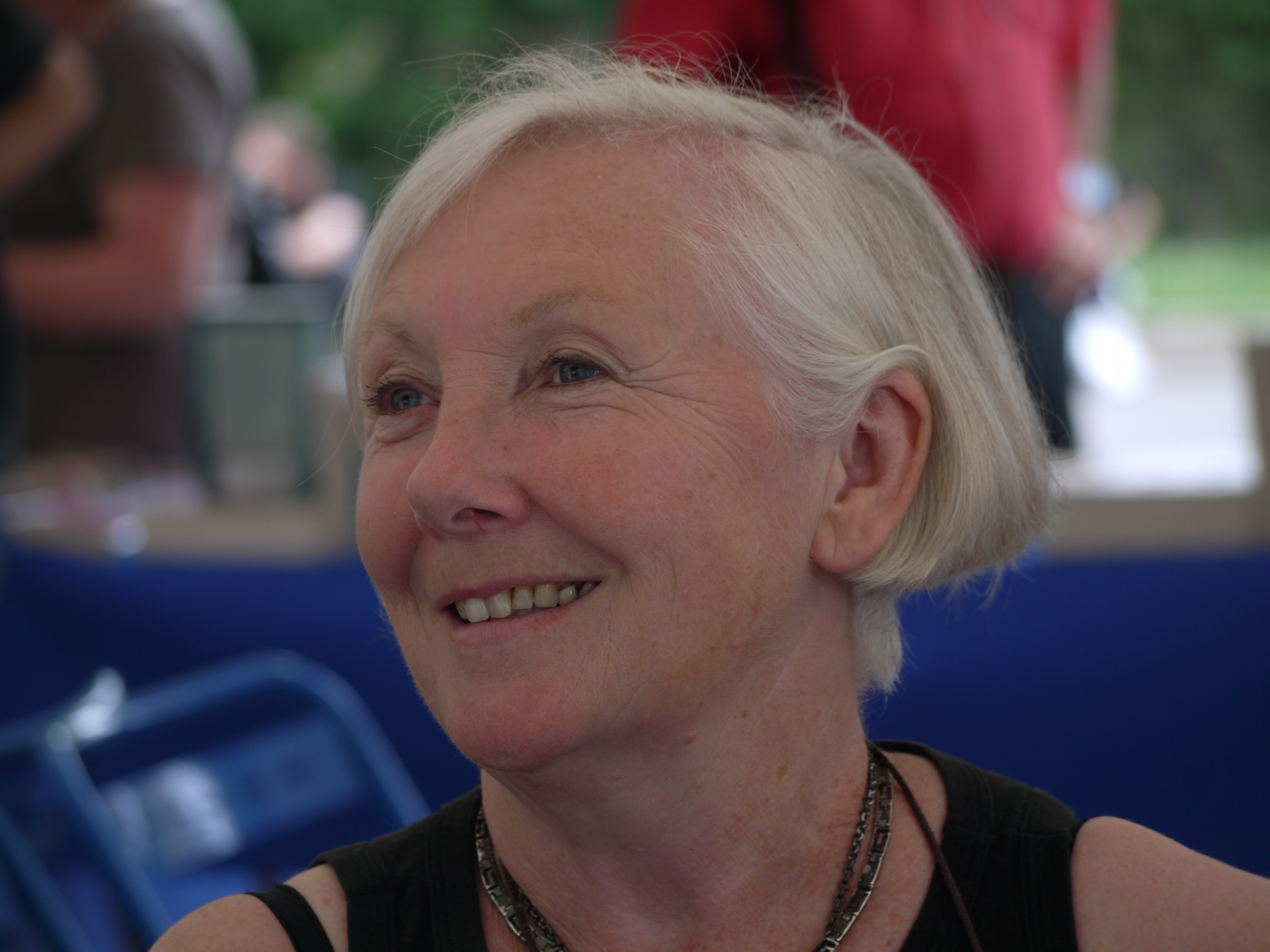
O'Brien in 2009

O'Brien has also written seven detective novels: Close-Up on Death (1989), Deadly Reflection (1993), Mask of Betrayal (1998), Dead Innocent (1999), Revenge (2001), Unauthorised Departure (2003) and Every Step You Take (2004); all feature the character of Detective Inspector John Bright.

== Personal life ==
O'Brien moved to Ontario, Canada, in November 1969, with husband Michael Moulds, who was then head of the Canadian Film Institute. In DWM 619, an interview with O'Brien during the making of Tales of the TARDIS she confirmed her husband had passed a year earlier.
