= List of Doctor Who novelisations =

Doctor Who is a British science fiction television programme produced by the BBC since 1963. Hundreds of novelisations of the series have been published by various publishers, the majority based on the original 1963–1989 run of the series.

== History ==
=== Frederick Muller Ltd. ===
Frederick Muller Ltd. commissioned David Whitaker to novelise the first Dalek serial under the title Doctor Who in an Exciting Adventure with the Daleks, which was published November 1964 in hardcover just in time for the second Dalek serial, The Dalek Invasion of Earth to be transmitted. The success of this book warranted two reprintings by 1965 and led Frederick Muller to commission two further novelisations, Doctor Who and the Zarbi and Doctor Who and the Crusaders, which were published in 1965 and 1966 respectively. Sales of these books did not live up to the first and so the short range was brought to an end.

Doctor Who in an Exciting Adventure with the Daleks was reissued in paperback October 1965 by Armada Books, an imprint of May Fair Books, with new illustrations. Doctor Who and the Crusaders was reissued in paperback in 1967 by Green Dragon, an imprint of Atlantic Books, again with new illustrations. All three books with reissued in hardcover in 1975 by White Lion, all featuring Tom Baker's Fourth Doctor on the cover while retaining the First Doctor illustrations inside.

=== Target Books ===
In 1972 Universal-Tandem Publishing was looking to create a children's book imprint, Target Books. In a visit to Frederick Muller's offices, the three 1960s Doctor Who books were optioned, and then the BBC was contacted with a view to publish new books. This call to the BBC met with enthusiastic support from the current script editor, Terrance Dicks. The Doctor Who novelisations quickly became a backbone of the imprint, surviving corporate acquisitions and novelising almost every Doctor Who television story. New novelisations under the Target imprint came to an end in 1991 (although three more were published under their parent company's new Doctor Who Books imprint). Reprints under the Target imprint continued through 1994.

A short series entitled The Companions of Doctor Who comprised the novelisation of K-9 and Company along with the original works Turlough and the Earthlink Dilemma and Harry Sullivan's War. In addition to the television serials, three scripts from the cancelled Season 23—The Nightmare Fair, The Ultimate Evil and Mission to Magnus—were novelised. The former sold less well than the usual novelisations, while the latter sold as well. Target also novelised two additional non-televised stories: the radio play Slipback and the audio story The Pescatons.

=== Doctor Who Books ===
Virgin Books created a new imprint, Doctor Who Books, for their Doctor Who novels and non-fiction books. This imprint published the last three books in the Doctor Who Library established by Target. (The Power of the Daleks, The Evil of the Daleks, and the radio play The Paradise of Death).

Further novelisations were published as part of their monthly novel lines. Barry Letts's radio drama, The Ghosts of N-Space was published as part of the Virgin Missing Adventures range in 1995, as was the novelisation of the independent spin-off Downtime in 1996. The Virgin New Adventures range published a novelisation of Shakedown: The Return of the Sontarans in 1995.

=== BBC Books ===
In 1996 the BBC chose not to renew Virgin's license for publishing Doctor Who fiction, preferring to bring the novels back in house. BBC Books published a novelisation of the 1996 Doctor Who television movie. They also published a novelisation of the webcast Scream of the Shalka as part of the Past Doctor Adventures range in 2004. From 2012 to 2019, BBC Books published novelisations of the 1970s and 1980s serials Target was unable to publish (The Pirate Planet, City of Death, Shada, Resurrection of the Daleks, and Revelation of the Daleks). Novelisations of the unproduced scripts Doctor Who and the Krikkitmen and Doctor Who Meets Scratchman were published in 2018 and 2019 respectively. A new adaptation of The Evil of the Daleks written by Frazer Hines was released in 2023.

BBC Books began reprinting selected Target novelisations starting in July 2011.

==== The Target Collection ====
Starting in 2018, BBC Books published novelisations of selected episodes of the revived series as part of a range dubbed The Target Collection featuring the Target logo. Paperback editions of City of Death, The Pirate Planet, Resurrection of the Daleks, Revelation of the Daleks, and the 1996 television movie were also added to the revived Target range. (City of Death and The Pirate Planet were abridged from their previous BBC Books editions.) In 2022, print versions of the previously audiobook-only adaptations by David Fisher of The Stones of Blood and The Androids of Tara were also added to the range, as was a print edition of the expanded audiobook version of Warriors Gate in 2023. The Target Collection was subsequently divided into two series: the Classic Era, comprising books based on stories from the original television series and the revived series through 2022, and the New Era, comprising books based on television stories broadcast since 2023, starting with the three 2023 specials.

==== Audiobooks ====
In 2005, BBC Audio released unabridged audiobook versions of the first three Frederick Muller novelisations, read by actor William Russell (who played Ian Chesterton). Beginning in September 2007, they began releasing further unabridged audiobooks of the Target novelisations at a regular rate. BBC Audiobooks went on to release audiobooks of every classic Doctor Who television story starting with Doctor Who and the Daleks. (Rights issues are preventing a release of an adaptation of An Unearthly Child.) Most new novelisations published receive a simultaneous audiobook release, or one shortly after print release.

=== Pearson Education ===
Pearson Education published adaptations of four Eleventh Doctor stories in 2011 (two of which were photonovelisations) and six Twelfth Doctor stories in 2018 for use in schools.

== Publication details ==
=== Writing ===
Although Target endeavoured to commission the original scriptwriters to novelise their own stories, this was not always possible. As a result, many books in the Target line were written by Terrance Dicks. During the late 1970s to early 1980s, Target, which classified the novelisations as children's fiction, imposed a page limit of 128 pages. Some books (particularly several by Dicks) even fell short of this limit. By the late 1980s, however, the page cap had been lifted, although John Peel was still required to split his novelisation of the epic 12-episode The Daleks' Master Plan into two volumes because the manuscript was too long.

=== Titles ===
For the first few years of the Target line, it was common practice for the novels to have titles that differed from the adapted serials: for example, Doctor Who and the Auton Invasion, which was based upon the serial Spearhead from Space. This practice was dropped in the mid-1970s. Another tradition established by the books was to prepend the words "Doctor Who and ..." to the titles, except in a few cases where impractical. This practice continued until the early 1980s. From 1990 onwards reprints of the books generally dropped "Doctor Who and..." from the title and changed titles back to the original television story, although some of the reprints merely rejacketed earlier stock.

=== Illustrators ===
The first of the Target reissues featured new cover artwork by Chris Achilleos, who went on to illustrate over 30 of the novelisations throughout the 1970s. British artist Andrew Skilleter created much of the cover art from 1979 to 1994, along with video covers and other merchandise. His work on Doctor Who was showcased in his 1995 volume Blacklight: The Art of Andrew Skilleter.

=== Numbering ===
Target began numbering its novelisations from 1983, with almost all of the first seventy-three books being numbered as reprints came out. The first new book to be numbered was Time-Flight. Target's numbering did not initially reflect original publication order (which would have placed David Whitaker's Doctor Who and the Daleks book first) or the production or broadcast order of the original stories, but rather was conducted in alphabetical order, so that the novelisation of The Abominable Snowmen was numbered "1". Due to print delays and last-minute reordering of publication schedules, some of the later books were released out of numeric order. The revived "Target Collection" from BBC Books is not numbered on the covers. However, the Penguin website lists the books based on stories prior to 2023 as Doctor Who Target Novels – Classic Era and numbers them 1-20, but this list omits "Twice Upon a Time", the Doctor Who Magazine exclusive Target of Frazer Hines's The Evil of the Daleks, and the books published in 2026. The website also groups the books based on stories since 2023 as Doctor Who Target Novels – New Era, but does not number them.

== Novelisations of television stories ==
=== First Doctor ===
Featuring William Hartnell's First Doctor

Season	Story no.	Library no. (Note: Number in Target's Doctor Who Library, if applicable)	Novelisation title	Author	Hardcover release date (Note: Published by Target's parent companies (Allen Wingate, W. H. Allen, BBC Books) unless otherwise indicated)	Paperback release date (Note: Published by Target Books (or by BBC Books under the Target Collection umbrella) unless otherwise indicated)	Audiobook	
Season	Story no.	Library no.	Novelisation title	Author	Hardcover release date	Paperback release date	Release date (Note: Unabridged from BBC Audio / AudioGo unless otherwise indicated)	Narrator
1	001	68	Doctor Who and An Unearthly Child	Terrance Dicks	15 October 1981		—N/a	
1	001	—N/a	An Unearthly Child (Note: This audiobook was originally scheduled to be released in November 2013 but the release was cancelled due to AudioGo's bankruptcy. Rights issues are preventing its release.)	Nigel Robinson	—N/a			William Russell
1	002	—N/a	Doctor Who in an Exciting Adventure with the Daleks	David Whitaker	12 November 1964 (Note: Published by Frederick Muller Ltd.)	4 October 1965 (Note: Published by Armada Books)	—N/a	
1	002	16	Doctor Who and the Daleks	David Whitaker	23 June 1975 (Note: Published by White Lion)	2 May 1973	7 March 2005	William Russell
1	003	132	The Edge of Destruction	Nigel Robinson	19 May 1988	20 October 1988	31 August 2010	William Russell
1	004	94	Marco Polo	John Lucarotti	13 December 1984	11 April 1985	6 December 2018	Zienia Merton
1	005	38	Doctor Who and the Keys of Marinus	Philip Hinchcliffe	21 August 1980		1 September 2022	Jamie Glover
1	006	88	The Aztecs	John Lucarotti	21 June 1984	20 September 1984	2 August 2012	William Russell
1	007	118	The Sensorites	Nigel Robinson	19 February 1987	16 July 1987	3 May 2012	William Russell
1	008	119	The Reign of Terror	Ian Marter	19 March 1987	20 August 1987	2 June 2022	Jamie Glover
2	009	145	Planet of Giants	Terrance Dicks	—N/a	18 January 1990	4 May 2017	Carole Ann Ford
2	010	17	Doctor Who and the Dalek Invasion of Earth	Terrance Dicks	24 March 1977		5 November 2009	William Russell (Note: Dalek voices performed by Nicholas Briggs)
2	011	124	The Rescue	Ian Marter	20 August 1987	21 January 1988	4 April 2013	Maureen O'Brien
2	012	120	The Romans	Donald Cotton	16 April 1987	17 September 1987	5 January 2023	Several: Tim Treloar, Jamie Glover, Dan Starkey, Jon Culshaw, Maureen O'Brien, Louise Jameson, and Clare Corbett
2	013	73	Doctor Who and the Zarbi	Bill Strutton	16 September 1965	2 May 1973	7 November 2005	William Russell
2	014	12	Doctor Who and the Crusaders	David Whitaker	24 February 1966	1967 (Note: Published by Green Dragon)	7 November 2005	William Russell
2	015	117	The Space Museum	Glyn Jones	15 January 1987	18 June 1987	4 February 2016	Maureen O'Brien
2	016	140	The Chase	John Peel	—N/a	20 July 1989	4 August 2011	Maureen O'Brien
2	017	126	The Time Meddler	Nigel Robinson	15 October 1987	17 March 1988	6 October 2016	Peter Purves
3	018	104	Galaxy Four	William Emms	14 November 1985	10 April 1986	6 July 2017	Maureen O'Brien
3	019, 021	141	The Daleks' Master Plan Part I: Mission to the Unknown	John Peel	—N/a	21 September 1989	6 May 2010	Jean Marsh and Peter Purves
3	020	97	The Myth Makers	Donald Cotton	11 April 1985	12 September 1985	7 April 2008	Stephen Thorne
3	021	142	The Daleks' Master Plan Part II: The Mutation of Time	John Peel	—N/a	19 October 1989	3 June 2010	Jean Marsh and Peter Purves
3	022	122	The Massacre	John Lucarotti	18 June 1987	19 November 1987	11 June 2015	Peter Purves
3	023	114	The Ark	Paul Erickson	16 October 1986	19 March 1987	1 March 2018	Peter Purves
3	024	111	The Celestial Toymaker	Gerry Davis and Alison Bingeman	19 June 1986	20 November 1986	3 April 2025	Peter Purves
3	025	101	The Gunfighters	Donald Cotton	11 July 1985	9 January 1986	7 February 2013	Shane Rimmer
3	026	109	The Savages	Ian Stuart Black	20 March 1986	11 September 1986	4 February 2021	Peter Purves
3	027	136	The War Machines	Ian Stuart Black	—N/a	16 February 1989	7 March 2019	Michael Cochrane
4	028	133	The Smugglers	Terrance Dicks	16 June 1988	17 November 1988	6 August 2020	Anneke Wills
4	029	62	Doctor Who and the Tenth Planet	Gerry Davis	19 February 1976		7 December 2017	Anneke Wills (Note: Cyberman voices performed by Nicholas Briggs)

=== Second Doctor ===
Featuring Patrick Troughton's Second Doctor

Season	Story no.	Library no. (Note: Number in Target's Doctor Who Library, if applicable)	Novelisation title	Author	Hardcover release date (Note: Published by Target's parent companies (Allen Wingate, W. H. Allen, BBC Books) unless otherwise indicated)	Paperback release date (Note: Published by Target Books (or by BBC Books under the Target Collection umbrella) unless otherwise indicated)	Audiobook	
Season	Story no.	Library no.	Novelisation title	Author	Hardcover release date	Paperback release date	Release date (Note: Unabridged from BBC Audio / AudioGo unless otherwise indicated)	Narrator
4	030	154	The Power of the Daleks	John Peel	—N/a	15 July 1993	3 November 2022	Nicholas Briggs
4	031	90	The Highlanders	Gerry Davis	16 August 1984	15 November 1984	6 September 2012	Anneke Wills
4	032	129	The Underwater Menace	Nigel Robinson	18 February 1988	21 July 1988	2 December 2021	Anneke Wills
4	033	14	Doctor Who and the Cybermen	Gerry Davis	16 July 1981	20 February 1975	12 March 2009	Anneke Wills (Note: Cyberman voices performed by Nicholas Briggs)
4	034	123	The Macra Terror	Ian Stuart Black	16 July 1987	10 December 1987	4 August 2016	Anneke Wills
4	035	116	The Faceless Ones	Terrance Dicks	11 December 1986	21 May 1987	2 May 2019	Anneke Wills
4	036	155	The Evil of the Daleks	John Peel	—N/a	19 August 1993	—N/a	
4	036	—N/a	The Evil of the Daleks (unabridged) (Note: This adaptation follows the Doctor showing Zoe the story at the end of The Wheel in Space.)	Frazer Hines (with Mike Tucker and Steve Cole)	26 October 2023	—N/a	26 October 2023	Frazer Hines (Note: Dalek voices performed by Nicholas Briggs)
4	036	—N/a	The Evil of the Daleks (abridged)	Frazer Hines (with Mike Tucker and Steve Cole)	—N/a	10 October 2024 (Note: Released exclusively with Doctor Who Magazine #609)	—N/a	
5	037	66	Doctor Who and the Tomb of the Cybermen	Gerry Davis	18 May 1978		7 March 2013	Michael Kilgarriff
5	038	1	Doctor Who and the Abominable Snowmen	Terrance Dicks	17 January 1985	21 November 1974	24 March 2009	David Troughton
5	039	33	Doctor Who and the Ice Warriors	Brian Hayles	18 March 1976		7 January 2010	Frazer Hines
5	040	24	Doctor Who and the Enemy of the World	Ian Marter	16 April 1981		4 July 2019	David Troughton
5	041	72	Doctor Who and the Web of Fear	Terrance Dicks	19 August 1976		3 August 2017	David Troughton
5	042	110	Fury from the Deep	Victor Pemberton	22 May 1986	16 October 1986	7 July 2011	David Troughton
5	043	130	The Wheel in Space	Terrance Dicks	17 March 1988	18 August 1988	5 August 2021	David Troughton
6	044	86	The Dominators	Ian Marter	19 April 1984	19 July 1984	6 September 2018	Michael Troughton
6	045	115	The Mind Robber	Peter Ling	20 November 1986	16 April 1987	6 August 2009	Derek Jacobi
6	046	98	The Invasion	Ian Marter	16 May 1985	10 October 1985	7 April 2016	David Troughton
6	047	99	The Krotons	Terrance Dicks	13 June 1985	14 November 1985	2 April 2020	Frazer Hines
6	048	112	The Seeds of Death	Terrance Dicks	17 July 1986	4 December 1986	2 February 2023	David Troughton
6	049	147	The Space Pirates	Terrance Dicks	—N/a	15 March 1990	1 December 2016	Terry Molloy
6	050	70	Doctor Who and the War Games	Malcolm Hulke	25 October 1979	25 September 1979	1 February 2011	David Troughton

=== Third Doctor ===
Featuring Jon Pertwee's Third Doctor.

Season	Story no.	Library no. (Note: Number in Target's Doctor Who Library, if applicable)	Novelisation title	Author	Hardcover release date (Note: Published by Target's parent companies (Allen Wingate, W. H. Allen, BBC Books) unless otherwise indicated)	Paperback release date (Note: Published by Target Books (or by BBC Books under the Target Collection umbrella) unless otherwise indicated)	Audiobook	
Season	Story no.	Library no.	Novelisation title	Author	Hardcover release date	Paperback release date	Release date (Note: Unabridged from BBC Audio / AudioGo unless otherwise indicated)	Narrator
7	051	6	Doctor Who and the Auton Invasion	Terrance Dicks	17 January 1974		12 June 2008	Caroline John
7	052	9	Doctor Who and the Cave Monsters	Malcolm Hulke	17 January 1974		3 September 2007	Caroline John
7	053	121	The Ambassadors of Death	Terrance Dicks	21 May 1987	15 October 1987	4 January 2018	Geoffrey Beevers
7	054	89	Inferno	Terrance Dicks	19 July 1984	18 October 1984	7 April 2011	Caroline John
8	055	63	Doctor Who and the Terror of the Autons	Terrance Dicks	19 February 1981	15 May 1975	5 August 2010	Geoffrey Beevers
8	056	96	The Mind of Evil	Terrance Dicks	21 March 1985	11 July 1985	6 April 2017	Richard Franklin
8	057	10	Doctor Who and the Claws of Axos	Terrance Dicks	21 April 1977		4 June 2016	Richard Franklin
8	058	23	Doctor Who and the Doomsday Weapon	Malcolm Hulke	18 March 1982	18 March 1974	3 September 2007	Geoffrey Beevers
8	059	15	Doctor Who and the Dæmons	Barry Letts	14 January 1982	17 October 1974	14 August 2008	Barry Letts
9	060	18	Doctor Who and the Day of the Daleks	Terrance Dicks	20 August 1981	18 March 1974	3 November 2016	Richard Franklin (Note: Dalek voices performed by Nicholas Briggs)
9	061	13	Doctor Who and the Curse of Peladon	Brian Hayles	17 July 1980	16 January 1975	3 July 1995 (Note: Abridged)	Jon Pertwee
9	061	13	Doctor Who and the Curse of Peladon	Brian Hayles	17 July 1980	16 January 1975	2 May 2013	David Troughton
9	062	54	Doctor Who and the Sea-Devils	Malcolm Hulke	18 June 1981	17 October 1974	7 June 2012	Geoffrey Beevers
9	063	44	Doctor Who and the Mutants	Terrance Dicks	29 September 1977		4 October 2018	Jon Culshaw
9	064	102	The Time Monster	Terrance Dicks	12 September 1985	13 February 1986	16 March 2023	Jon Culshaw
10	065	64	The Three Doctors (Note: The 1976 edition (and subsequent reprintings until 1991) is titled Doctor Who and the Three Doctors on the front cover.)	Terrance Dicks	20 November 1975		1978 (Note: Published by the Royal National Institute of the Blind)	Gabriel Woolf
10	065	64	The Three Doctors	Terrance Dicks	20 November 1975		7 April 2010	Katy Manning
10	066	8	Doctor Who and the Carnival of Monsters	Terrance Dicks	20 January 1977		1978	Gabriel Woolf
10	066	8	Doctor Who and the Carnival of Monsters	Terrance Dicks	20 January 1977		13 November 2014	Katy Manning
10	067	57	Doctor Who and the Space War	Malcolm Hulke	23 September 1976		4 February 2008	Geoffrey Beevers
10	068	46	Doctor Who and the Planet of the Daleks	Terrance Dicks	21 October 1976 (Note: An abridged version was first published in Doctor Who and the Daleks Omnibus in September 1976)		5 June 1995	Jon Pertwee
10	068	46	Doctor Who and the Planet of the Daleks	Terrance Dicks	21 October 1976		6 June 2013	Mark Gatiss
10	069	29	Doctor Who and the Green Death	Malcolm Hulke	16 April 1981	21 August 1975	4 September 2008	Katy Manning
11	070	65	Doctor Who and the Time Warrior	Terrance Dicks (Note: Prologue by Robert Holmes (uncredited))	18 May 1978	29 June 1978	13 November 2008	Jeremy Bulloch
11	071	22	Doctor Who and the Dinosaur Invasion	Malcolm Hulke	19 February 1976		5 November 2007	Martin Jarvis
11	072	20	Death to the Daleks	Terrance Dicks	20 July 1978		3 March 2016	Jon Culshaw
11	073	43	Doctor Who and the Monster of Peladon	Terrance Dicks	20 November 1980	4 December 1980	5 March 2020	Jon Culshaw
11	074	48	Doctor Who and the Planet of the Spiders	Terrance Dicks	20 November 1975	16 October 1975	4 June 2009	Elisabeth Sladen

=== Fourth Doctor ===
Featuring Tom Baker's Fourth Doctor.

Season	Story no.	Library no. (Note: Number in Target's Doctor Who Library, if applicable)	Novelisation title	Author	Hardcover release date (Note: Published by Target's parent companies (Allen Wingate, W. H. Allen, BBC Books) unless otherwise indicated)	Paperback release date (Note: Published by Target Books (or by BBC Books under the Target Collection umbrella) unless otherwise indicated)	Audiobook	
Season	Story no.	Library no.	Novelisation title	Author	Hardcover release date	Paperback release date	Release date (Note: Unabridged from BBC Audio / AudioGo unless otherwise indicated)	Narrator
12	075	28	Doctor Who and the Giant Robot	Terrance Dicks	17 April 1986	13 March 1975	5 November 2007	Tom Baker
12	075	—N/a	Junior Doctor Who and the Giant Robot	Terrance Dicks	December 1979	Early 1980	—N/a	
12	076	4	Doctor Who and the Ark in Space	Ian Marter	21 April 1977	10 May 1977	16 July 2015	Jon Culshaw
12	077	56	Doctor Who and the Sontaran Experiment	Ian Marter	7 December 1978		7 July 2016	Jon Culshaw
12	078	27	Doctor Who and the Genesis of the Daleks	Terrance Dicks	22 July 1976		10 July 2012 (Note: Published by the Royal National Institute of the Blind)	Terry Molloy
12	078	27	Doctor Who and the Genesis of the Daleks	Terrance Dicks	22 July 1976		5 October 2017	Jon Culshaw (Note: Dalek voices performed by Nicholas Briggs)
12	079	51	Doctor Who and the Revenge of the Cybermen	Terrance Dicks	20 May 1976		3 February 2022	Nicholas Briggs
13	080	40	Doctor Who and the Loch Ness Monster	Terrance Dicks	15 January 1976		1978	Gabriel Woolf
13	080	40	Doctor Who and the Loch Ness Monster	Terrance Dicks	15 January 1976		16 October 2025	Jon Culshaw
13	081	47	Doctor Who and the Planet of Evil	Terrance Dicks	21 July 1977	18 August 1977	6 April 2023	Tim Treloar
13	082	50	Doctor Who and the Pyramids of Mars	Terrance Dicks	16 December 1976		14 August 2008	Tom Baker
13	083	2	Doctor Who and the Android Invasion	Terrance Dicks	16 November 1978		18 August 2022	Geoffrey Beevers
13	084	7	Doctor Who and the Brain of Morbius	Terrance Dicks	19 May 1977	23 June 1977	4 February 2008	Tom Baker
13	084	—N/a	Junior Doctor Who and the Brain of Morbius	Terrance Dicks	27 June 1980	13 November 1980	—N/a	
13	085	55	Doctor Who and the Seeds of Doom	Philip Hinchcliffe	17 February 1977		5 September 2019	Michael Kilgarriff
14	086	42	Doctor Who and the Masque of Mandragora	Philip Hinchcliffe	19 January 1978	8 December 1977	9 April 2009	Tim Pigott-Smith
14	087	30	Doctor Who and the Hand of Fear	Terrance Dicks	18 January 1979		7 January 2021	Pamela Salem
14	088	19	Doctor Who and the Deadly Assassin	Terrance Dicks	20 October 1977		19 March 2015	Geoffrey Beevers
14	089	25	Doctor Who and the Face of Evil	Terrance Dicks	19 January 1978		19 January 2011	Louise Jameson
14	089	25	Doctor Who and the Face of Evil	Terrance Dicks	19 January 1978		7 April 2022	Louise Jameson
14	090	53	Doctor Who and the Robots of Death	Terrance Dicks	24 May 1979		1 February 2018	Louise Jameson
14	091	61	Doctor Who and the Talons of Weng-Chiang	Terrance Dicks	17 November 1977		1 January 2013	Christopher Benjamin
15	092	32	Doctor Who and the Horror of Fang Rock	Terrance Dicks	30 March 1978		2 February 2017	Louise Jameson
15	093	36	Doctor Who and the Invisible Enemy	Terrance Dicks	29 March 1979		2 August 2018	John Leeson
15	094	34	Doctor Who and the Image of the Fendahl	Terrance Dicks	26 July 1979		6 February 2020	Louise Jameson
15	095	60	Doctor Who and the Sunmakers	Terrance Dicks	18 November 1982		7 February 2019	Louise Jameson (Note: K9 voice performed by John Leeson)
15	096	67	Doctor Who and the Underworld	Terrance Dicks	24 January 1980		6 May 2021	Louise Jameson
15	097	35	Doctor Who and the Invasion of Time	Terrance Dicks	21 February 1980		1 September 2016	John Leeson
16	098	52	Doctor Who and the Ribos Operation	Ian Marter	13 December 1979		3 March 2011	John Leeson
16	098	—N/a	The Ribos Operation (Note: Published as part of The Key to Time collection)	James Goss	29 October 2026	TBA	April 2027	TBA
16	099	—N/a	The Pirate Planet (unabridged)	James Goss	5 January 2017	1 February 2018 (Note: Published by BBC Books)	5 January 2017	Jon Culshaw
16	099	—N/a	Doctor Who and the Pirate Planet (abridged)	James Goss	29 October 2026 (Note: Titled simply The Pirate Planet)	11 March 2021	—N/a	
16	100	59	Doctor Who and the Stones of Blood	Terrance Dicks	20 March 1980		4 June 2026	Geoffrey Beevers
16	100	—N/a	The Stones of Blood	David Fisher	29 October 2026	14 July 2022	5 May 2011	Susan Engel
16	101	3	Doctor Who and the Androids of Tara	Terrance Dicks	24 April 1980		5 November 2026	Geoffrey Beevers
16	101	—N/a	The Androids of Tara	David Fisher	29 October 2026	14 July 2022	5 July 2012	John Leeson
16	102	49	Doctor Who and the Power of Kroll	Terrance Dicks	29 May 1980		7 October 2021	Geoffrey Beevers
16	102	—N/a	The Power of Kroll	Robert Shearman	29 October 2026	TBA	April 2027	TBA
16	103	5	Doctor Who and the Armageddon Factor	Terrance Dicks	26 June 1980		6 June 2019	John Leeson
16	103	—N/a	The Armageddon Factor	James Goss	29 October 2026	TBA	April 2027	TBA
17	104	21	Doctor Who and the Destiny of the Daleks	Terrance Dicks	22 November 1979		5 September 2024	Jon Culshaw
17	105	—N/a	City of Death (unabridged)	James Goss	21 May 2015	11 February 2016	21 May 2015	Lalla Ward
17	105	—N/a	City of Death (abridged)	James Goss	—N/a	5 April 2018	—N/a	
17	106	11	Doctor Who and the Creature from the Pit	David Fisher	15 January 1981		7 April 2008	Tom Baker
17	107	45	Doctor Who and the Nightmare of Eden	Terrance Dicks	18 September 1980	21 August 1980	6 October 2022	Dan Starkey
17	108	31	Doctor Who and the Horns of Nimon	Terrance Dicks	16 October 1980		4 April 2024	Geoffrey Beevers
17	108.5	—N/a	Shada	Gareth Roberts	15 March 2012	31 January 2013	15 March 2012	Lalla Ward
18	109	39	Doctor Who and the Leisure Hive	David Fisher	22 July 1982		1 July 2013	Lalla Ward
18	110	75	Meglos	Terrance Dicks	17 February 1983	19 May 1983	1 July 2021	Jon Culshaw
18	111	26	Full Circle	Andrew Smith	16 September 1982		15 January 2015	Matthew Waterhouse
18	112	—N/a	State of Decay (Note: Original novelisation exclusive to audio)	Terrance Dicks	—N/a		June 1981 (Note: Published by Pickwick Talking Books)	Tom Baker
18	112	58	Doctor Who and the State of Decay	Terrance Dicks	17 September 1981	14 January 1982	7 January 2016	Geoffrey Beevers
18	113	71	Doctor Who and Warriors' Gate	Stephen Gallagher (as John Lydecker) (Note: Print version of the expanded edition is credited solely to Gallagher)	15 April 1982		—N/a	
18	113	—N/a	Warriors' Gate (Note: Expanded and restored original version as submitted to Target before John Nathan-Turner demanded that it match the transmitted version more closely. Print version is titled Warriors' Gate and Beyond as it includes two short stories.)	Stephen Gallagher (as John Lydecker)	—N/a	13 July 2023	4 April 2019	Jon Culshaw
18	114	37	Doctor Who and the Keeper of Traken	Terrance Dicks	20 May 1982		1 October 2020	Geoffrey Beevers
18	115	41	Logopolis	Christopher H. Bidmead	21 October 1982		4 February 2010	Christopher H. Bidmead

=== Fifth Doctor ===
Featuring Peter Davison's Fifth Doctor.

Season	Story no.	Library no. (Note: Number in Target's Doctor Who Library, if applicable)	Novelisation title	Author	Hardcover release date (Note: Published by Target's parent companies (Allen Wingate, W. H. Allen, BBC Books) unless otherwise indicated)	Paperback release date (Note: Published by Target Books (or by BBC Books under the Target Collection umbrella) unless otherwise indicated)	Audiobook	
Season	Story no.	Library no.	Novelisation title	Author	Hardcover release date	Paperback release date	Release date (Note: Unabridged from BBC Audio / AudioGo unless otherwise indicated)	Narrator
19	116	76	Castrovalva	Christopher H. Bidmead	17 March 1983	16 June 1983	4 March 2010	Peter Davison
19	117	77	Four to Doomsday	Terrance Dicks	14 April 1983	21 July 1983	2 March 2017	Matthew Waterhouse
19	118	84	Kinda	Terrance Dicks	8 December 1983	15 March 1984	4 August 1997 (Note: Abridged)	Peter Davison
19	118	84	Kinda	Terrance Dicks	8 December 1983	15 March 1984	6 June 2024	Janet Fielding
19	119	69	Doctor Who and the Visitation	Eric Saward	19 August 1982	19 August 1982	4 October 2012	Matthew Waterhouse
19	120	113	Black Orchid	Terence Dudley	18 September 1986	19 February 1987	12 June 2008	Michael Cochrane
19	121	78	Earthshock	Ian Marter	19 May 1983	18 August 1983	2 February 2012	Peter Davison (Note: Cyberman voices performed by Nicholas Briggs)
19	122	74	Time-Flight	Peter Grimwade	20 January 1983	14 April 1983	1 April 2021	Peter Davison
20	123	80	Arc of Infinity	Terrance Dicks	21 July 1983	20 October 1983	3 June 2021	Geoffrey Beevers
20	124	83	Snakedance	Terrance Dicks	21 January 1984	19 April 1984	6 February 2025	Geoffrey Beevers
20	125	82	Mawdryn Undead	Peter Grimwade	18 August 1983	12 January 1984	5 July 2018	David Collings
20	126	79	Terminus	Stephen Gallagher (as John Lydecker)	16 June 1983	15 September 1983	1 August 2019	Steven Pacey
20	127	85	Enlightenment	Barbara Clegg	16 February 1984	24 May 1984	3 September 2020	Steven Pacey
20	128	108	The King's Demons	Terence Dudley	20 February 1986	10 July 1986	5 May 2016	Mark Strickson
20	129	81	The Five Doctors	Terrance Dicks	24 November 1983		2 November 2017	Jon Culshaw (Note: Dalek and Cyberman voices by Nicholas Briggs)
21	130	87	Warriors of the Deep	Terrance Dicks	24 May 1984	16 August 1984	5 June 1995	Peter Davison
21	130	87	Warriors of the Deep	Terrance Dicks	24 May 1984	16 August 1984	4 May 2023	Janet Fielding
21	131	95	The Awakening	Eric Pringle	14 February 1985	13 June 1985	8 July 2010	Nerys Hughes
21	132	91	Frontios	Christopher H. Bidmead	20 September 1984	10 December 1984	2 March 2010 (Note: Published by the Royal National Institute of the Blind)	Beth Chalmers
21	132	91	Frontios	Christopher H. Bidmead	20 September 1984	10 December 1984	16 April 2015	Christopher H. Bidmead
21	133	—N/a	Resurrection of the Daleks	Eric Saward	18 July 2019	11 March 2021	1 August 2019	Terry Molloy (Note: Dalek voices by Nicholas Briggs)
21	134	93	Planet of Fire	Peter Grimwade	18 October 1984	17 January 1985	5 June 2025	David Banks
21	135	92	The Caves of Androzani	Terrance Dicks	15 November 1984	14 February 1985	1 November 2018	Peter Davison

=== Sixth Doctor ===
Featuring Colin Baker's Sixth Doctor.

Season	Story no.	Library no. (Note: Number in Target's Doctor Who Library, if applicable)	Novelisation title	Author	Hardcover release date (Note: Published by Target's parent companies (Allen Wingate, W. H. Allen, BBC Books) unless otherwise indicated)	Paperback release date (Note: Published by Target Books (or by BBC Books under the Target Collection umbrella) unless otherwise indicated)	Audiobook	
Season	Story no.	Library no.	Novelisation title	Author	Hardcover release date	Paperback release date	Release date (Note: Unabridged from BBC Audio / AudioGo unless otherwise indicated)	Narrator
21	136	103	The Twin Dilemma	Eric Saward	10 October 1985	13 March 1986	5 January 2012	Colin Baker
22	137	138	Attack of the Cybermen	Eric Saward	—N/a	20 April 1989	7 August 1995 (Note: Abridged)	Colin Baker
22	137	138	Attack of the Cybermen	Eric Saward	—N/a	20 April 1989	1 February 2024	David Banks
22	138	106	Vengeance on Varos	Philip Martin	21 January 1988	16 June 1988	3 November 1997	Colin Baker
22	138	106	Vengeance on Varos	Philip Martin	21 January 1988	16 June 1988	7 November 2019	Martin Jarvis
22	139	107	The Mark of the Rani	Pip and Jane Baker	16 January 1986	12 June 1986	5 April 2018	Nicola Bryant
22	140	100	The Two Doctors	Robert Holmes	15 August 1985	5 December 1985	3 September 2015	Colin Baker
22	141	105	Timelash	Glen McCoy	12 December 1985	15 May 1986	3 March 2022	Colin Baker
22	142	—N/a	Revelation of the Daleks	Eric Saward	14 November 2019	11 March 2021	14 November 2019	Terry Molloy (Note: Dalek voices performed by Nicholas Briggs)
23	143	127 (Note: Mistakenly numbered as number 126 on the title page)	The Mysterious Planet	Terrance Dicks	19 November 1987	21 April 1988	2 September 2013	Lynda Bellingham
23	143	139	Mindwarp	Philip Martin	—N/a	15 June 1989	2 September 2013	Colin Baker
23	143	125	Terror of the Vervoids	Pip and Jane Baker	17 September 1987	18 February 1988	3 October 2013	Bonnie Langford
23	143	131	The Ultimate Foe	Pip and Jane Baker	21 April 1988	15 September 1988	3 October 2013	Michael Jayston

=== Seventh Doctor ===
Featuring Sylvester McCoy's Seventh Doctor.

Season	Story no.	Library no. (Note: Number in Target's Doctor Who Library, if applicable)	Novelisation title	Author	Hardcover release date (Note: Published by Target's parent companies (Allen Wingate, W. H. Allen, BBC Books) unless otherwise indicated)	Paperback release date (Note: Published by Target Books (or by BBC Books under the Target Collection umbrella) unless otherwise indicated)	Audiobook	
Season	Story no.	Library no.	Novelisation title	Author	Hardcover release date	Paperback release date	Release date (Note: Unabridged from BBC Audio / AudioGo unless otherwise indicated)	Narrator
24	144	128 (Note: Mistakenly numbered as number 127)	Time and the Rani	Pip and Jane Baker	17 December 1987	5 May 1988	6 January 2022	Bonnie Langford
24	145	134	Paradise Towers	Stephen Wyatt	—N/a	1 December 1988	5 April 2012	Bonnie Langford
24	146	135	Delta and the Bannermen	Malcolm Kohll	—N/a	19 January 1989	1 June 2017	Bonnie Langford
24	147	137	Dragonfire	Ian Briggs	—N/a	16 March 1989	5 December 2019	Bonnie Langford
25	148	148	Remembrance of the Daleks	Ben Aaronovitch	—N/a	21 June 1990	19 February 2015	Terry Molloy
25	149	146	The Happiness Patrol	Graeme Curry	—N/a	15 February 1990	2 July 2009	Rula Lenska
25	150	143	Silver Nemesis	Kevin Clarke	—N/a	16 November 1989	6 July 2023	David Banks
25	151	144	The Greatest Show in the Galaxy	Stephen Wyatt	—N/a	21 December 1989	1 August 2013	Sophie Aldred
26	152	152	Battlefield	Marc Platt	—N/a	18 July 1991	5 May 2022	Toby Longworth
26	153	149	Ghost Light	Marc Platt	—N/a	20 September 1990	2 June 2011	Ian Hogg
26	154	151	The Curse of Fenric	Ian Briggs	—N/a	15 November 1990	3 September 2015	Terry Molloy
26	155	150	Survival	Rona Munro	—N/a	18 October 1990	7 September 2017	Lisa Bowerman

=== Eighth Doctor ===
Featuring Paul McGann's Eighth Doctor.

Season	Story no.	Novelisation title	Author	Original publisher	Paperback release date	Audiobook	
Season	Story no.	Novelisation title	Author	Original publisher	Paperback release date	Release date (Note: Unabridged from BBC Audio / AudioGo unless otherwise indicated)	Narrator
—	156	The Novel of the Film	Gary Russell	BBC Books	15 May 1996	2 June 1997 (abridged)	Paul McGann
—	156	The TV Movie (Note: Revised from the previous publication)	Gary Russell	BBC Books (Target collection)	11 March 2021		Dan Starkey

=== Ninth Doctor ===
Featuring Christopher Eccleston's Ninth Doctor.

Series	Story no.	Novelisation title	Author	Hardcover release date (Note: Published by BBC Books unless otherwise indicated)	Paperback release date (Note: Published by BBC Books under the Target Collection umbrella unless otherwise indicated)	Audiobook	
Series	Story no.	Novelisation title	Author	Hardcover release date	Paperback release date	Release date (Note: Unabridged from BBC Audio / AudioGo unless otherwise indicated)	Narrator
1	157	Rose	Russell T Davies	23 November 2023	5 April 2018	3 May 2018	Camille Coduri
1	160	Aliens of London (Note: Also adapts "World War Three")	Joseph Lidster	—N/a	26 March 2026		Camille Coduri
1	161	Dalek	Robert Shearman	—N/a	11 March 2021		Nicholas Briggs

=== Tenth Doctor ===
Featuring David Tennant's Tenth Doctor.

Series	Story no.	Novelisation title	Author	Original publisher	Paperback release date	Audiobook	
Series	Story no.	Novelisation title	Author	Original publisher	Paperback release date	Release date (Note: Unabridged from BBC Audio / AudioGo unless otherwise indicated)	Narrator
2	167	The Christmas Invasion (Note: Also adapts "Doctor Who: Children in Need")	Jenny T. Colgan	BBC Books (Target collection)	5 April 2018		Camille Coduri
2	174	The Satan Pit (Note: Also adapts "The Impossible Planet")	Matt Jones	BBC Books (Target collection)	26 March 2026		Claire Rushbrook; Ronny Jhutti; Silas Carson; Maureen O'Brien
4	190	The Fires of Pompeii	James Moran	BBC Books (Target collection)	14 July 2022	14 July 2022	Clare Corbett
4	191	Planet of the Ood	Keith Temple	BBC Books (Target collection)	13 July 2023		Silas Carson
2008–10 specials	201	The Waters of Mars	Phil Ford	BBC Books (Target collection)	13 July 2023		Maureen O'Brien

=== Eleventh Doctor ===
Featuring Matt Smith's Eleventh Doctor.

Series	Story no.	Novelisation title	Author	Original publisher	Paperback release date	Audiobook	
Series	Story no.	Novelisation title	Author	Original publisher	Paperback release date	Release date (Note: Unabridged from BBC Audio / AudioGo unless otherwise indicated)	Narrator
5	203	The Eleventh Hour	Trevor Baxendale	Pearson Education	5 May 2011	—N/a	
5	205	Victory of the Daleks (Note: Photo novelisation)	Peter Gutiérrez	Pearson Education	5 May 2011	—N/a	
5	206	The Time of Angels (Note: Also adapts "Flesh and Stone")	Trevor Baxendale	Pearson Education	5 May 2011	—N/a	
5	206	The Time of Angels	Jenny T. Colgan	BBC Books (Target collection)	26 March 2026		Maureen O'Brien
5	211	The Lodger	Peter Gutiérrez	Pearson Education	5 May 2011	—N/a	
7	237	The Crimson Horror	Mark Gatiss	BBC Books (Target collection)	11 March 2021		Dan Starkey; Catrin Stewart
2013 specials	240	The Day of the Doctor (Note: Also adapts "The Night of the Doctor")	Steven Moffat	BBC Books (Target collection)	5 April 2018	7 June 2018	Nicholas Briggs

=== Twelfth Doctor ===
Featuring Peter Capaldi's Twelfth Doctor.

Series	Story no.	Novelisation title	Author	Original publisher	Paperback release date	Audiobook	
Series	Story no.	Novelisation title	Author	Original publisher	Paperback release date	Release date (Note: Unabridged from BBC Audio / AudioGo unless otherwise indicated)	Narrator
8	244	Robot of Sherwood	David Maule	Pearson Education	29 May 2018 (Note: mp3-CD issued by Pearson with paperback of the novelisation)		TBA
8	249	Mummy on the Orient Express	Jane Rollason	Pearson Education	29 May 2018		TBA
8	250	Flatline	Nancy Taylor	Pearson Education	29 May 2018		TBA
9	256	The Girl Who Died	Jane Rollason	Pearson Education	20 September 2018		TBA
9	257	The Woman Who Lived	Chris Rice	Pearson Education	20 September 2018		TBA
9	258	The Zygon Invasion (Note: Also adapts "The Zygon Inversion".)	Peter Harness	BBC Books (Target collection)	13 July 2023	7 September 2023	Dan Starkey
9	260	Face the Raven	Nancy Taylor	Pearson Education	20 September 2018		TBA
10	274	The Eaters of Light	Rona Munro	BBC Books (Target collection)	14 July 2022		Rebecca Benson
10	276	Twice Upon a Time	Paul Cornell	BBC Books (Target collection)	5 April 2018	7 June 2018	Mark Gatiss

=== Thirteenth Doctor ===
Featuring Jodie Whittaker's Thirteenth Doctor.

Series	Story no.	Novelisation title	Author	Original publisher	Paperback release date	Audiobook	
Series	Story no.	Novelisation title	Author	Original publisher	Paperback release date	Release date (Note: Unabridged from BBC Audio / AudioGo unless otherwise indicated)	Narrator
11	283	Kerblam!	Pete McTighe	BBC Books (Target collection)	13 July 2023	3 August 2023	Julie Hesmondhalgh
11	284	The Witchfinders	Joy Wilkinson	BBC Books (Target collection)	11 March 2021		Sophie Aldred

=== Fourteenth Doctor ===
Featuring David Tennant's Fourteenth Doctor.

Series	Story no.	Novelisation title	Author	eBook release date (Note: Published by BBC Books under the Target Collection umbrella unless otherwise indicated)	Hardcover release date	Paperback release date	Audiobook	
Series	Story no.	Novelisation title	Author	eBook release date	Hardcover release date	Paperback release date	Release date (Note: Unabridged from BBC Audio / AudioGo unless otherwise indicated)	Narrator
2023 specials	—N/a	"Destination: Skaro"	Steve Cole	19 September 2024 (Note: Published by BBC Children's Books as part of Fleeting Faces in Fifteen Doctors 15 Stories)	5 September 2024 (Note: Published by BBC Children's Books as part of The Official Annual 2025)	19 September 2024		Jacob Dudman
2023 specials	301	The Star Beast	Gary Russell	30 November 2023	—N/a	11 January 2024	1 February 2024	Jacqueline King
2023 specials	302	Wild Blue Yonder	Mark Morris	7 December 2023	—N/a	11 January 2024	1 February 2024	Bonnie Langford
2023 specials	303	The Giggle	James Goss	14 December 2023	—N/a	11 January 2024	1 February 2024	Dan Starkey

=== Fifteenth Doctor ===
Featuring Ncuti Gatwa's Fifteenth Doctor.

Series	Story no.	Novelisation title	Author	Hardcover release date (Note: Published by BBC Books unless otherwise indicated)	Paperback release date (Note: Published by BBC Books under the Target Collection umbrella unless otherwise indicated)	Audiobook	
Series	Story no.	Novelisation title	Author	Hardcover release date	Paperback release date	Release date (Note: Unabridged from BBC Audio / AudioGo unless otherwise indicated)	Narrator
14	304	The Church on Ruby Road	Esmie Jikiemi-Pearson	25 January 2024	8 August 2024	25 January 2024	Angela Wynter
14	305	Space Babies	Alison Rumfitt	—N/a	8 August 2024		Clare Corbett
14	308	73 Yards	Scott Handcock	—N/a	8 August 2024		Susan Twist
14	310	Rogue	Kate Herron and Briony Redman	—N/a	8 August 2024		Dan Starkey
14	311	Empire of Death (Note: Also adapts "The Legend of Ruby Sunday")	Scott Handcock	—N/a	10 July 2025		Susan Twist
15	313	The Robot Revolution	Una McCormack	—N/a	10 July 2025		Varada Sethu
15	314	Lux	James Goss	—N/a	10 July 2025		Dan Starkey
15	315	The Well	Gareth L. Powell	—N/a	10 July 2025		Caoilfhionn Dunne

== Novelisations of audio dramas ==
Novelisations of audio dramas broadcast on radio or released on home audio.

Library no. (Note: Number in Target's Doctor Who Library, if applicable)	Novelisation title	Doctor	Author	Hardcover release date (Note: Published by Target's parent companies (Allen Wingate, W. H. Allen, BBC Books) unless otherwise indicated)	Paperback release date (Note: Published by Target Books (or by BBC Books under the Target Collection umbrella) unless otherwise indicated)	Audiobook	
Library no.	Novelisation title	Doctor	Author	Hardcover release date	Paperback release date	Release date (Note: Unabridged from BBC Audio / AudioGo unless otherwise indicated)	Narrator
—N/a	Slipback	6th	Eric Saward	14 August 1986	15 January 1987	2 April 2026	Jon Glover
153	The Pescatons	4th	Victor Pemberton	—N/a	15 September 1991	1 January 2026	Jon Culshaw
156	The Paradise of Death	3rd	Barry Letts	—N/a	21 April 1994	6 August 2026	Jon Culshaw
—N/a	The Ghosts of N-Space (Note: Published as part of the Virgin Missing Adventures range)	3rd	Barry Letts	—N/a	16 February 1995	7 Jaunary 2027	Christopher Naylor
—N/a	Jubilee	6th	Robert Shearman	9 October 2025	14 May 2026 (Note: Published by BBC Books)	—N/a	
—N/a	The Chimes of Midnight	8th	Robert Shearman	9 October 2025	5 November 2026	—N/a	

== Novelisations of unproduced stories ==
Novelisations of stories written, but not produced, for television or film.

Novelisation title	Doctor	Author	Hardcover release date (Note: Published by Target's parent companies (Allen Wingate, W. H. Allen, BBC Books) unless otherwise indicated)	Paperback release date (Note: Published by Target Books (or by BBC Books under the Target Collection umbrella) unless otherwise indicated)	Audiobook	
Novelisation title	Doctor	Author	Hardcover release date	Paperback release date	Release date (Note: Unabridged from BBC Audio / AudioGo unless otherwise indicated)	Narrator
The Nightmare Fair	6th	Graham Williams	—N/a	18 May 1989	1 June 2023	Toby Longworth
The Ultimate Evil	6th	Wally K. Daly	—N/a	17 August 1989	2 March 2010 (Note: Published by the Royal National Institute of the Blind)	Wally K. Daly
The Ultimate Evil	6th	Wally K. Daly	—N/a	17 August 1989	3 September 2026	Nicola Bryant
Mission to Magnus	6th	Philip Martin	—N/a	19 July 1990	6 November 2025	Nicola Bryant
Doctor Who and the Krikkitmen	4th	James Goss	18 January 2018	14 February 2019 (Note: Published by BBC Books)	18 January 2018	Dan Starkey
Scratchman	4th	Tom Baker (with James Goss)	24 January 2019	9 April 2020	24 January 2019	Tom Baker
The Six Doctors (Note: Novelisation of the story that later evolved into The Five Doctors)	1st, 2nd, 3rd, 4th, 5th	Simon Guerrier	21 January 2027	TBA	21 January 2027	Dan Starkey
The Vampire Mutation (Note: Novelisation of the story that later evolved into State of Decay)	4th	Steve Cole	4 March 2027	TBA	4 March 2027	Louise Jameson

== Novelisations of webcasts ==
Novelisations of stories released via the web.

Novelisation title	Doctor	Author	Original publisher	Paperback release date	Audiobook	
Novelisation title	Doctor	Author	Original publisher	Paperback release date	Release date	Narrator
Scream of the Shalka	Shalka	Paul Cornell	BBC Books	2 February 2004	2 June 2016	David Collings
Adventures in Lockdown (Note: Collection of short stories released during the 2020 COVID-19 lockdown. Includes prose versions of the webcasts "Message from the Doctor", "Shadow of a Doubt", "The Shadow in the Mirror", "Listen", and "The Secret of Novice Hame".)	13th 8th 9th 1st 12th 10th	Chris Chibnall; Steven Moffat; Russell T Davies; Neil Gaiman; Joy Wilkinson; Vinay Patel; Pete McTighe; Paul Cornell; Mark Gatiss	BBC Books	5 November 2020	—N/a	

== Novelisations of comic strips ==
Novelisation title	Doctor	Author	Original publisher	Hardcover release date	Audiobook	
Novelisation title	Doctor	Author	Original publisher	Hardcover release date	Release date	Narrator
Dead on Arrival & Other Stories (Note: Audiobook adaptations of comics from World Distributors' Doctor Who Annuals)	3rd 4th	Paul Magrs	BBC Audio	—N/a	1 December 2022	Katy Manning; Jon Culshaw; Tim Treloar
"The Psychic Jungle" "Neuronic Nightmare" (Note: Published as part of The Amazing World of Doctor Who, this is an adaptation of the comic stories of the same name from the 1976 promotional book)	4th	TBA	BBC Audio	—N/a	20 April 2023	Geoffrey Beevers; Louise Jameson; Dan Starkey
"Into Control" (Note: Published as part of Ten Days of Christmas, this is an adaptation of the comic story of the same name from The Official Annual 2024)	14th	Stephen Cole	BBC Children's Books	12 October 2023	12 October 2023	Jacob Dudman
The Vampire Plants & Other Stories	2nd 3rd 4th	Paul Magrs	BBC Audio	—N/a	4 December 2025	Jon Culshaw; Katy Manning; Matthew Waterhouse

== Unofficial novelisations ==
A number of fan-run publications have published unofficial novelisations of stories Target was not able to secure rights to. Obverse Books has also published unofficial novelisations to raise money for charity. As well as novelisations of the two 1960s Dalek films, Obverse also published original novels presented as novelisations of further films based on other television stories featuring Peter Cushing's portrayal of Dr. Who and short story collections presented as novelisations of hypothetical episodes of the proposed 1960s radio adaptions, also featuring Cushing's Dr. Who.

TV No.	Title	Doctor	Author	Published	Publisher	Notes
019, 021	The Daleks' Master Plan	1st	Rosemary Howe	1980	Zerinza	Unlicensed Australian fanzine publication - issues 14-16. Later reprinted as single volume.
—N/a	Doctor Who and Shada	4th	Paul Scoones	March 1989	TSV	Unlicensed fan club publication.
099	Doctor Who and the Pirate Planet	4th	David Bishop	September 1990	TSV	Unlicensed fan club publication.
142	Revelation of the Daleks	6th	Jon Preddle	July 1992	TSV	Unlicensed fan club publication.
105	Doctor Who and the City of Death	4th	David Lawrence	November 1992	TSV	Unlicensed fan club publication.
—N/a	Shada	4th	Jonathan Way	1993	Doctor Who Appreciation Society	Unlicensed fan club publication published across six issues of Cosmic Masque, the Doctor Who Appreciation Society's fan fiction publication.
133	Resurrection of the Daleks	5th	Paul Scoones	January 2000	TSV	Unlicensed fan club publication.
167	Doctor Who and the Invasion of Christmas	10th	The Midnight Folk	February 2016	Obverse Books	Unlicensed novelisation strictly limited to 40 copies. "The Midnight Folk" is a pseudonym for Paul Magrs, Andrew Hickey, Stuart Douglas, Nick Campbell, James Gent, Ira Lightman, Ian Potter, Phil Craggs, and Matthew Bright. Proceeds went to aid the Cystic Foundation Trust.
—N/a	Dr. Who and the Daleks	Dr. Who	Alan Smithee	April 2019	Obverse Books	Unlicensed novelisation of the 1965 film
—N/a	Daleks Invasion Earth 2150AD	Dr. Who	Alan Smithee	April 2019	Obverse Books	Unlicensed novelisation of the 1966 film
—N/a	Journey into Time	Dr. Who	David Agnew (editor)	June 2020	Obverse Books	Includes an unlicensed novelisation of the late 1960s radio pilot as well as original stories written as if the radio series had been produced.

== Omnibus and two in one releases ==
A number of novelisations were released in omnibus editions, mostly by book clubs.

Title	Novelisations included	Author	Publisher	Published
Doctor Who and the Daleks Omnibus	Doctor Who and the Planet of the Daleks (abridged)	Terrance Dicks	Artus Books	September 1976
Doctor Who and the Daleks Omnibus	Doctor Who and the Genesis of the Daleks (abridged)	Terrance Dicks	Artus Books	September 1976
The Doctor Who Omnibus	Doctor Who and the Space War	Malcolm Hulke	Book Club Associates	1977
The Doctor Who Omnibus	Doctor Who and the Web of Fear	Terrance Dicks	Book Club Associates	1977
The Doctor Who Omnibus	Doctor Who and the Revenge of the Cybermen	Terrance Dicks	Book Club Associates	1977
The Adventures of Doctor Who	Doctor Who and the Genesis of the Daleks	Terrance Dicks	Nelson Doubleday	October 1979
The Adventures of Doctor Who	Doctor Who and the Revenge of the Cybermen	Terrance Dicks	Nelson Doubleday	October 1979
The Adventures of Doctor Who	Doctor Who and the Loch Ness Monster	Terrance Dicks	Nelson Doubleday	October 1979
Dalek Omnibus	The Dalek Invasion of Earth	Terrance Dicks	W. H. Allen	23 June 1983
Dalek Omnibus	The Planet of the Daleks	Terrance Dicks	W. H. Allen	23 June 1983
Dalek Omnibus	The Day of the Daleks	Terrance Dicks	W. H. Allen	23 June 1983
The Further Adventures of Doctor Who	Doctor Who and the Deadly Assassin	Terrance Dicks	Nelson Doubleday	January 1986
The Further Adventures of Doctor Who	Doctor Who and the Face of Evil	Terrance Dicks	Nelson Doubleday	January 1986
The Further Adventures of Doctor Who	Doctor Who and the Robots of Death	Terrance Dicks	Nelson Doubleday	January 1986
Remembrance of the Daleks/Prisoner of the Daleks	Remembrance of the Daleks	Ben Aaronovitch	BBC Books	15 July 2016
Remembrance of the Daleks/Prisoner of the Daleks	Prisoner of the Daleks (New Series Adventure)	Trevor Baxendale	BBC Books	15 July 2016
The Essential Terrance Dicks Vol. 1	Doctor Who and the Dalek Invasion of Earth	Terrance Dicks	BBC Books	26 August 2021
The Essential Terrance Dicks Vol. 1	Doctor Who and the Abominable Snowmen	Terrance Dicks	BBC Books	26 August 2021
The Essential Terrance Dicks Vol. 1	Doctor Who – The Wheel in Space	Terrance Dicks	BBC Books	26 August 2021
The Essential Terrance Dicks Vol. 1	Doctor Who and the Auton Invasion	Terrance Dicks	BBC Books	26 August 2021
The Essential Terrance Dicks Vol. 1	Doctor Who and the Day of the Daleks	Terrance Dicks	BBC Books	26 August 2021
The Essential Terrance Dicks Vol. 2	Doctor Who and the Genesis of the Daleks	Terrance Dicks	BBC Books	26 August 2021
The Essential Terrance Dicks Vol. 2	Doctor Who and the Pyramids of Mars	Terrance Dicks	BBC Books	26 August 2021
The Essential Terrance Dicks Vol. 2	Doctor Who and the Talons of Weng-Chiang	Terrance Dicks	BBC Books	26 August 2021
The Essential Terrance Dicks Vol. 2	Doctor Who and the Horror of Fang Rock	Terrance Dicks	BBC Books	26 August 2021
The Essential Terrance Dicks Vol. 2	Doctor Who – The Five Doctors	Terrance Dicks	BBC Books	26 August 2021
The Key to Time	The Ribos Operation	James Goss	BBC Books	29 October 2026
The Key to Time	The Pirate Planet	James Goss	BBC Books	29 October 2026
The Key to Time	The Stones of Blood	David Fisher	BBC Books	29 October 2026
The Key to Time	The Andriods of Tara	David Fisher	BBC Books	29 October 2026
The Key to Time	The Power of Kroll	Robert Shearman	BBC Books	29 October 2026
The Key to Time	The Armageddon Factor	James Goss	BBC Books	29 October 2026

In 1988–1989, W. H. Allen's Star imprint published a number of the Target novelisations in a format of two novelisations in one book in a range titled Doctor Who Classics. These were produced by fixing together two Target books with a new front page and outer cover. The pairings were:

Title 1	Author	Title 2	Author	Published
The Dalek Invasion of Earth	Terrance Dicks	The Crusade	David Whitaker	August 1988
The Gunfighters	Donald Cotton	The Myth Makers	Donald Cotton	August 1988
The Dominators	Ian Marter	The Krotons	Terrance Dicks	September 1988
The Mind of Evil	Terrance Dicks	The Claws of Axos	Terrance Dicks	March 1989
The Dæmons	Barry Letts	The Time Monster	Terrance Dicks	March 1989
The Seeds of Doom	Philip Hinchliffe	The Deadly Assassin	Terrance Dicks	May 1989
The Face of Evil	Terrance Dicks	The Sun Makers	Terrance Dicks	May 1989

== Spin-off novelisations ==
=== The Companions of Doctor Who ===
The Companions of Doctor Who was a series of original full-length novels, the first original novels based on Doctor Who. The books were based on characters who had appeared in the television series as the Doctor's companions, and explored their lives after leaving the Doctor's company.

The first two books were Turlough and the Earthlink Dilemma by Tony Attwood, based upon the character played by Mark Strickson in the early 1980s, and Harry Sullivan's War, written by Ian Marter, who had played Harry Sullivan in the series a decade earlier. These books sold well, but after a third attempt (a novelisation of the 1981 Doctor Who spin-off, K-9 and Company) the series ended due sale not matching the same level as Doctor Who novelisations. Other novels would have featured Tegan, Sarah Jane Smith, Victoria, Jamie McCrimmon, UNIT, and a sequel to Harry Sullivan's War.

In 2026, Doctor Who Magazine added an abridged Target paperback of the New Series Adventure At Childhood's End to the range in issue 635.

Book title	Author	Paperback release date	Audiobook	
Book title	Author	Paperback release date	Release date	Narrator
Turlough and the Earthlink Dilemma	Tony Attwood	15 May 1986	—N/a	
Harry Sullivan's War	Ian Marter	16 October 1986	5 December 2024	Christopher Naylor
K-9 and Company	Terence Dudley	15 October 1987	3 December 2015	John Leeson
At Childhood's End (Abidged)	Sophie Aldred (with Steve Cole and Mike Tucker)	15 October 2026	—N/a	

=== The Sarah Jane Adventures ===
Beginning in 2007, Penguin Books under its Penguin Character Books imprint began publishing novelisations based upon the spinoff series The Sarah Jane Adventures.

No.	Title	Author	Published	Publisher
1	Invasion of the Bane	Terrance Dicks	1 November 2007	Penguin Character Books
2	Revenge of the Slitheen	Rupert Laight	1 November 2007	Penguin
3	Eye of the Gorgon	Phil Ford	1 November 2007	Penguin
4	Warriors of Kudlak	Gary Russell	1 November 2007	Penguin
5	Whatever Happened to Sarah Jane?	Rupert Laight	3 November 2008	Penguin
6	The Lost Boy	Gary Russell	3 November 2008	Penguin
7	The Last Sontaran	Phil Ford	6 November 2008	Penguin
8	The Day of the Clown	Phil Ford	5 November 2008	Penguin
9	The Wedding of Sarah Jane Smith	Gareth Roberts	5 November 2009	Penguin
—N/a	Judoon Afternoon	Trevor Baxendale	September 2010	Pearson Education
—N/a	The Haunted House	Trevor Baxendale	September 2010	Pearson Education
—N/a	Painting Peril	Trevor Baxendale	September 2010	Pearson Education
—N/a	Blathereen Dream	Trevor Baxendale	September 2010	Pearson Education
—N/a	The Nightmare Man	Joseph Lidster	25 November 2010	ePenguin (e-book)
—N/a	Death of the Doctor	Gary Russell	25 November 2010	ePenguin (e-book)

=== Direct to video spinoffs ===
Novelisations of spin off productions that were released direct to video.

Novelisation title	Author	Original publisher	Paperback release date	Audiobook	
Novelisation title	Author	Original publisher	Paperback release date	Release date	Narrator
Shakedown (Note: Published as part of the Virgin New Adventures range.)	Terrance Dicks	Doctor Who Books	December 1995	5 May 2016	Dan Starkey
Downtime (Note: Published as part of the Virgin Missing Adventures range.)	Marc Platt	Doctor Who Books	January 1996	—N/a	
The Dæmons of Devil's End (Note: Novelisation of the Reeltime drama The White Witch of Devil's End. Special edition titled Olive Hawthorne and the Dæmons of Devil's End.)	Suzanne Barbieri, Debbie Bennett, Raven Dane, Jan Edwards, David J Howe, and Sam Stone	Telos Publishing	November 2017	—N/a	
Dæmos Rising	David J. Howe	Telos Publishing	13 August 2019	—N/a	
Sil and the Devil Seeds of Arodor	Philip Martin	Telos Publishing	November 2019	—N/a	
Mindgame	David J. Howe	Telos Publishing	August 2020	—N/a	
Cyberon	James Hornby	Arcbeatle Press	21 September 2020	21 September 2020	Nigel Peever
Auton	David Black	BBV	April 2022	10 September 2024	Bill Baggs
Wartime	Stephen James Walker	Telos Publishing	January 2023	—N/a	

=== Audio spinoffs ===
Title	Author	Published	Publisher	Notes
Erimem - Return of the Queen	Claire Bartlett	4 January 2018	Thebes Publishing	Adaptation and expansion of the episode of the same name from Imagination Theatre's Kerides the Thinker radio series featuring Erimem
Republica	Micah K. Spurling	July 2021	BBV	Novelisation of the BBV audio featuring "The Professor and Ace" written by Mark Gatiss.
Cyber-Hunt	Callum Phillpott	3 September 2021	BBV	Novelisation of the BBV audio featuring "Fred" and the Cyberons written by Martin Peterson. An unabridged audiobook of this novelisation read by Bill Baggs was released May 2025.
Cybergeddon	Lupan Evezan	3 September 2021	BBV	Novelisation of the BBV audio featuring the Cyberons written by Paul Ebbs.
The Rani Reaps the Whirlwind	Micah K. Spurling	September 2021	BBV	Novelisation of the BBV audio written by Pip and Jane Baker. An unabridged audiobook of this novelisation read by Bill Baggs was released 26 November 2024.
The Root of All Evil	Paul Mount	April 2022	BBV	Novelisation of the BBV audio featuring the Krynoids written by Lance Parkin.
The Choice	James Mulholland	April 2022	BBV	Novelisation of the BBV audio featuring K9 written by Nigel Fairs. In this novelisation, the character of K9 has been changed to "B.E.S.", a bionic ferret.
The Minister of Chance	Dan Freeman	30 June 2022	Arcbeatle Press	Novel of the Radio Static series.
Children of the Circus	Kenton Hall	14 December 2023	Oak Tree Books	Novelisation of the audio play that is a sequel to The Greatest Show in the Galaxy

== Adaptations ==
Generally, Doctor Who stories that have been broadcast will be adapted into print, rather than vice versa. There have been three occasions where print media has been adapted for the screen or formed inspiration for television episodes.

The 1995 New Adventures novel Human Nature, written by Paul Cornell and featuring the Seventh Doctor, was adapted by the same author for the 2007 series of Doctor Who as a two part story with the episode titles "Human Nature" and "The Family of Blood", with David Tennant as the Tenth Doctor.

Steven Moffat based his 2007 episode "Blink" upon his 2005 short story, "What I Did on My Christmas Holidays by Sally Sparrow", originally published in Doctor Who Annual 2006.

Gareth Roberts reused his concept from a 2006 Doctor Who Magazine comic strip story as the basis for an episode of the same name "The Lodger", which was transmitted as part of Series 5 (2010), featuring Matt Smith.

== See also ==
- List of Torchwood novels and audio books
- List of television series made into books

== Bibliography ==
- Howe, David J.; Neal, Tim (2007). The Target Book. Telos Publishing. ISBN 978-1-84583-021-2.
- Smith, Paul MC (July 2021). Based on the Popular BBC Television Serial. Wonderful Books.
