= The Gunfighters (Doctor Who) =

025 – The Gunfighters
- Doctor Who serial
- Billy and Seth watch Steven and Dodo perform a ballad. An alternative version (Note: Tristram Cary composed the ballad music, written by Donald Cotton and Rex Tucker and sung by Lynda Baron.) is played throughout the serial; some appreciated its humour while others criticised the repetition. (Note: Some contemporary and retrospective reviews, including from the programme's co-creator Sydney Newman, criticised the ballad's lyrics, vocals, and repetitive nature, while other critics appreciated its comedic lyrics and narrative relevance.)

Cast
- Doctor: William Hartnell – First Doctor
- Companions: Peter Purves – Steven Taylor; Jackie Lane – Dodo Chaplet
- Others: William Hurndell – Ike Clanton; Maurice Good – Phineas Clanton; David Cole – Billy Clanton; Sheena Marshe – Kate; Shane Rimmer – Seth Harper; David Graham – Charlie; John Alderson – Wyatt Earp; Anthony Jacobs – Doc Holliday; Richard Beale – Bat Masterson; Reed De Rouen – Pa Clanton; Laurence Payne – Johnny Ringo; Martyn Huntley – Warren Earp; Victor Carin – Virgil Earp

Production
- Directed by: Rex Tucker (Note: Tucker was not credited on screen for the fourth episode, at his request.)
- Written by: Donald Cotton
- Script editor: Gerry Davis
- Produced by: Innes Lloyd
- Music by: Tristram Cary
- Production code: Z
- Series: Season 3
- Running time: 4 episodes, 25 minutes each
- First broadcast: 30 April 1966
- Last broadcast: 21 May 1966

Chronology
← Preceded by The Celestial Toymaker	Followed by → The Savages

The Gunfighters is the eighth serial of the third season of the British science fiction television series Doctor Who. Written by Donald Cotton and directed by Rex Tucker, it was broadcast on BBC1 in four weekly parts from 30 April to 21 May 1966. In the serial, the First Doctor (William Hartnell) and his travelling companions, Steven Taylor (Peter Purves) and Dodo Chaplet (Jackie Lane), arrive in Tombstone, Arizona, in the Wild West, where they become involved with the events leading up to the gunfight at the O.K. Corral.

Script editor Donald Tosh commissioned Cotton to write The Gunfighters after his work on The Myth Makers. Tosh wanted to parody American Westerns, and Cotton took a fictional approach. Tosh's successor, Gerry Davis, disliked the scripts, while new producer Innes Lloyd preferred science-fiction stories. A ballad composed by Tristram Cary and sung by Lynda Baron plays throughout the serial in place of incidental music. Filming took place at Television Centre and Riverside Studios from April to May 1966. Tucker disagreed with Lloyd's editing of the fourth episode and requested his directorial credit be removed.

The Gunfighters received an average of 6.25 million viewers across the four episodes, the season's lowest figures to date. Contemporary reviews were negative, with the fourth episode receiving the programme's lowest ever Appreciation Index score. The serial's reputation has improved over time, with retrospective reviews praising the set design and performances but criticising the accents; responses to the ballad were mixed. The story was novelised by Cotton in 1986, and the serial was released on VHS, DVD, and as an audiobook.

== Plot ==
In Tombstone, Arizona, the Clanton brothers—Ike, Phineas and Billy—search for Doc Holliday to avenge the death of their brother Reuben. They meet their hired hand Seth Harper at the Last Chance Saloon. This is overheard by bar singer Kate, who warns Holliday.

The TARDIS arrives in a stable, with the First Doctor in agony from a toothache. He and his travelling companions, Steven Taylor and Dodo Chaplet, encounter local marshal Wyatt Earp, who offers them protection. The Doctor finds the dentist, Holliday, while Dodo and Steven head to a hotel. They are mocked by the Clantons, who suspect the Doctor is Holliday. Seth invites the Doctor to the hotel. Holliday is initially happy to let him be shot in his place, but Kate intervenes to save the Doctor. Holliday hides upstairs at the hotel, firing his gun to con the Clantons into thinking the Doctor is indeed Holliday.

Wyatt and Sheriff Bat Masterson arrive and take the Doctor into custody for his own protection. Steven is confronted by a rabble, who are intent on lynching him as an associate of Holliday. Wyatt and Masterson defuse the situation and take Phineas into custody. The Doctor and Steven are freed and told to leave town. Dodo falls in with Kate and Holliday, who both plan to leave town and take her with them. When Seth stumbles across their escape plans, Holliday kills him, and the trio depart. Seth is soon replaced by a new arrival, Johnny Ringo. The Doctor and Steven return to the saloon in search of Dodo and encounter Ringo. Wyatt's brothers Warren and Virgil arrive at Tombstone to help him enforce the law. The other Clanton brothers visit the jail to free Phineas and kill Warren.

Steven and Kate are taken by Ringo to the Clanton ranch, where the Clantons tell their father that they killed Warren. Wyatt swears vengeance and starts to build a posse of lawmen. Holliday returns to Tombstone with Dodo and offers his services to Wyatt. The Doctor is unable to prevent a gunfight at the O.K. Corral; Ringo and the three Clantons are shot dead. Shortly after, the Doctor, Steven and Dodo depart in the TARDIS. They arrive on a strange planet, and decide to explore. As they leave, a man is seen approaching the TARDIS on the scanner.

== Production ==
=== Conception and writing ===
Donald Cotton enjoyed working with Doctor Who's script editor, Donald Tosh, while writing the serial The Myth Makers (1965). Tosh commissioned Cotton to write another four-part serial, Dr Who and the Gun-Fighters, on 30 November 1965, with a due date of 14 January 1966. Cotton's friend, Tony Snell, was touring the United States at the time and provided research about the history surrounding the gunfight at the O.K. Corral. Cotton ultimately favoured fictional depictions, such as Earp's 1931 biography and the American film Gunfight at the O.K. Corral (1957); several characters in the serial—such as Pa Clanton (who was dead), Bat Masterson, and Johnny Ringo—were not actually present in Tombstone at the time. Tosh wanted the serial to parody American Westerns like the 1957 film.

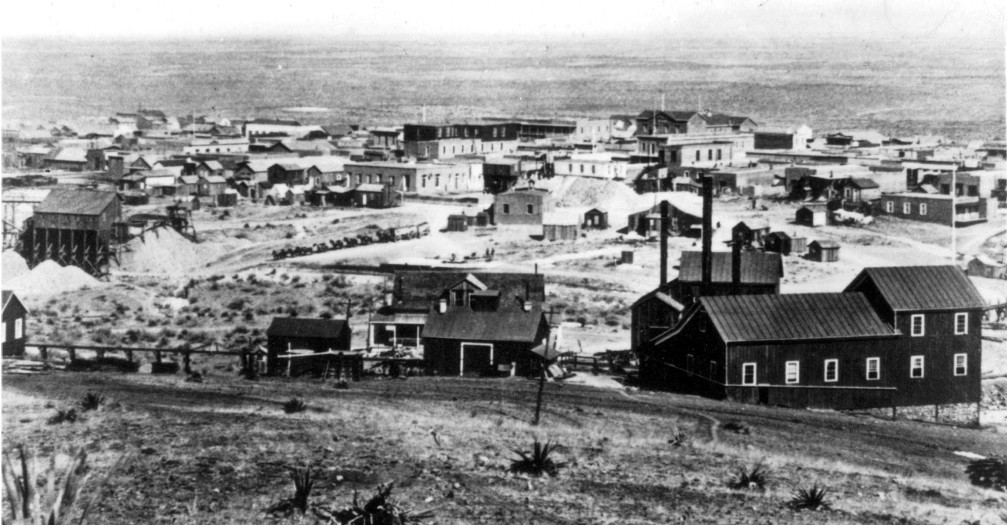
The Gunfighters is set in Tombstone, Arizona, in 1881, depicting the gunfight at the O.K. Corral.

Under the title Doctor Who & the Gunslingers, Cotton delivered the first two scripts on 15 December 1965 and 14 January 1966. Tosh resigned from Doctor Who in January, replaced by Gerry Davis, who Cotton was unhappy working for as he granted less freedom than his predecessor. Davis admired Cotton's sophistication and intelligence but felt he was not fit for Doctor Who and disliked the serial. The programme's new producer, Innes Lloyd, preferred science-fiction stories as he felt audiences preferred them over historicals. Tosh felt the wit of Cotton's scripts became less effective after being inherited by Davis and Lloyd because they disliked it.

Rex Tucker was assigned the serial's director; he had previously been the programme's "de facto producer" during its creation in 1963, before its first producer had arrived, and had been assigned to direct some first season serials before rescheduling. Cotton delivered the last two scripts, now titled The Gunfighters, on 26 and 31 January. Davis felt the third required rewriting as it lacked action and required too many sets, while Tucker had several criticisms. Lloyd ensured Tucker that Davis would rework the scripts, and suggested that the director approach the serial in a tongue-in-cheek fashion, comparing it to the comedy film Cat Ballou (1965). Tucker watched Gunfight at the O.K. Corral. Due to disagreements with Lloyd's editing, Tucker requested that his directorial credit be removed from the fourth episode; he remained credited in the Radio Times listing.

=== Music and design ===
Cotton had intended the song "The Ballad of the Last Chance Saloon" to be used throughout the serial, akin to Frankie Laine's "Gunfight at the O.K. Corral" in the 1957 film. Tucker, wanting it to spoof Marlene Dietrich's ballads, used it to replace the incidental music, emphasising its humour and using its lyrics to tell the story of the gunfight. Tristram Cary, a friend of Tucker who had worked on several other Doctor Who serials, composed fourteen minutes of music for the ballad; he later considered it his best score for the programme. It was recorded at Riverside Studios on 5 and 12 April. (Note: The first recording session consisted of the general lyrics written by Cotton, while the second session was for the story-specific lyrics by Tucker.) Tucker wanted his 17-year-old daughter Jane, also an extra in the serial, to perform it, but her voice was too light. It was sung by Lynda Baron, who considered it difficult, requiring several retakes until the recording session ended. Tom McCall, who had worked with Tucker, played a Challen piano for the song, including off-screen during recording of the first episode; Winifred Taylor played it in the second.

Barry Newbery was assigned the serial's designer. He chose not to view Western films as inspiration, instead studying Yale University's photographs of buildings in 1880s Tombstone; he was surprised to their similarities to English architecture in the same period, and ultimately designed the exteriors as a blend of the photographs and the stereotypical western image. Newbery hired several props from the Old Times Props House in Putney. His design drawings for the second and third episodes were delivered late due to the script rewrites and his work on an earlier serial, The Ark (1966). Newbery, who had worked on Doctor Who since its first serial in 1963, moved to work on Adam Adamant Lives! (1966–1967) after The Gunfighters; he returned years later to design The Dominators (1968).

=== Casting and characters ===
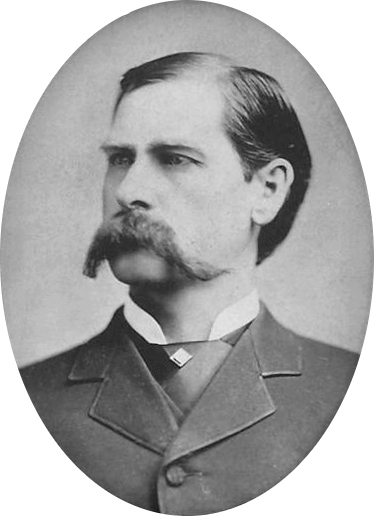
Wyatt Earp

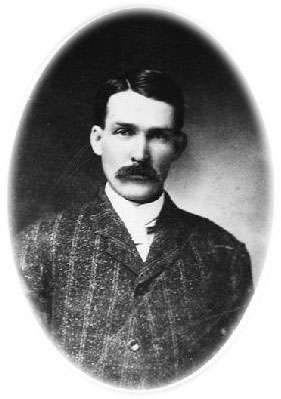
Warren Earp

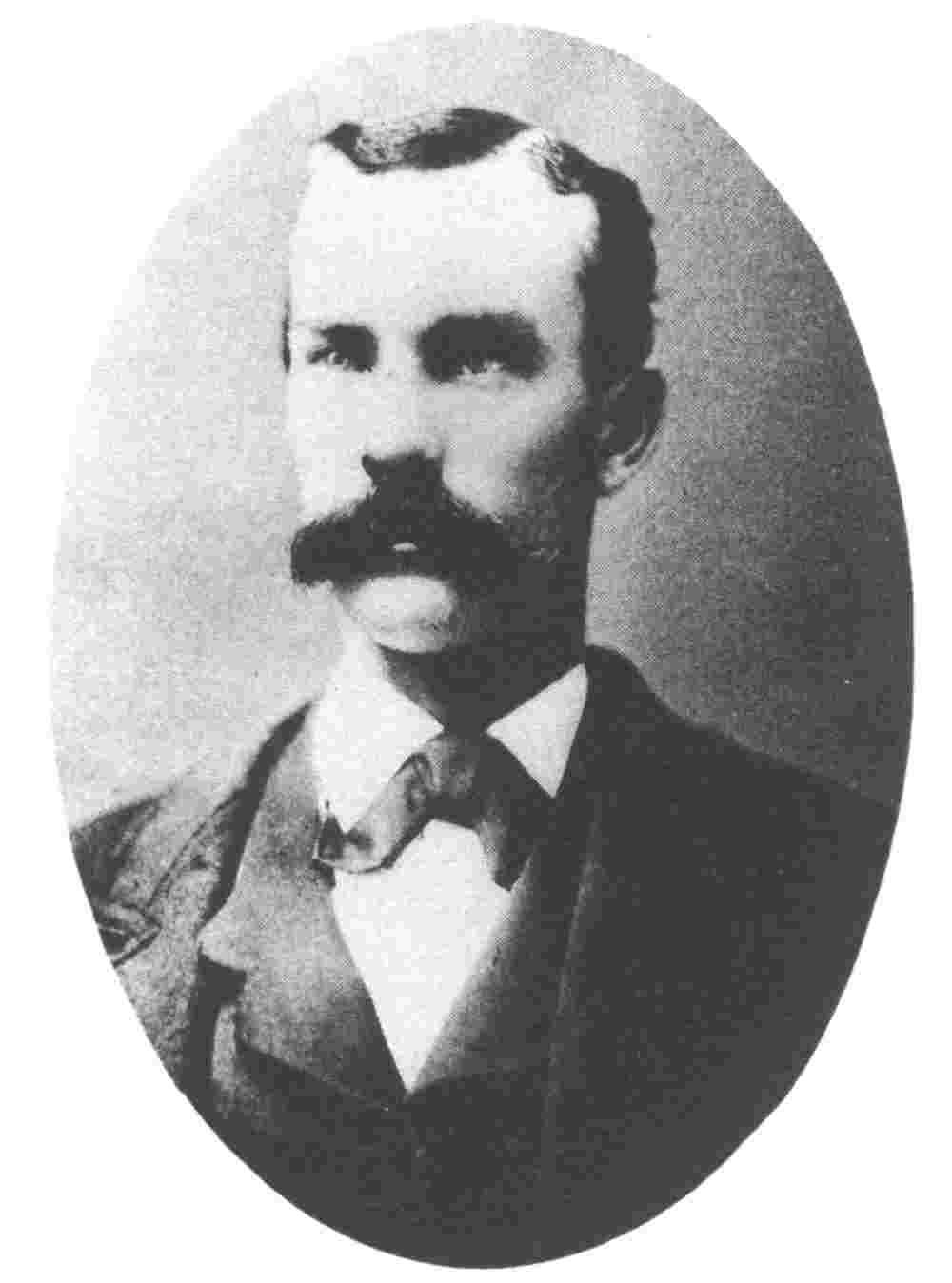
Johnny Ringo

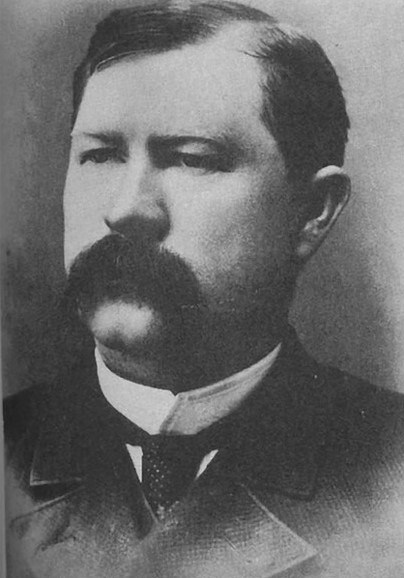
Virgil Earp

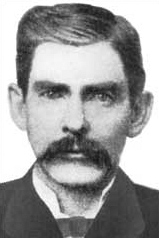
Doc Holliday

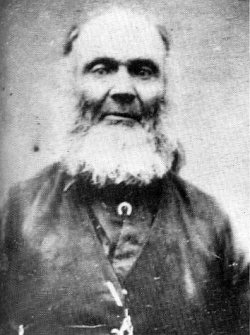
Pa Clanton

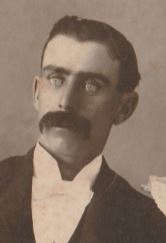
Bat Masterson

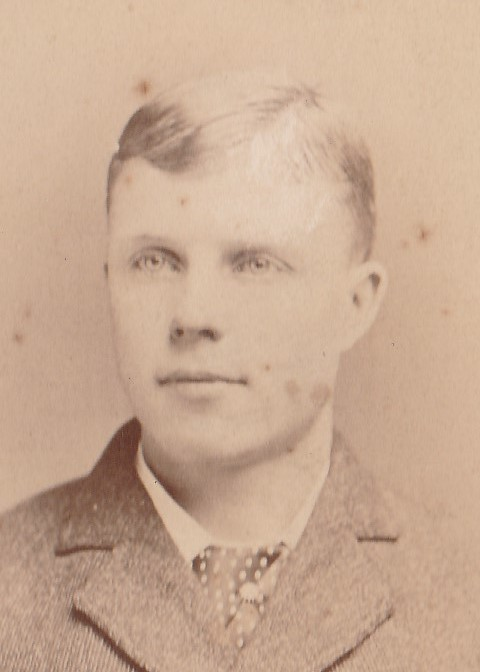
Ike Clanton

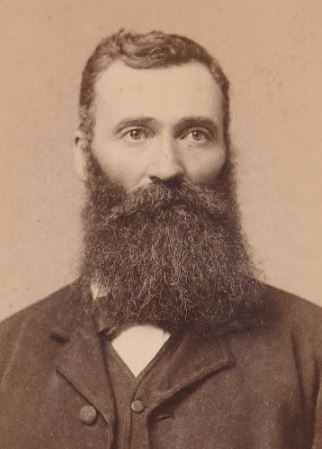
Phineas Clanton

The Gunfighters features depictions of several real figures associated with the gunfight at the O.K. Corral.

William Hartnell claimed it was his idea to make a Western serial. The Doctor referring to Wyatt Earp as "Mr Werp" was an ad-lib by Hartnell; the camera scripts used his correct name. The scripts originally indicated that Dodo would sing "The Ballad of the Last Chance Saloon" while Steven played piano; the roles were reversed due to Jackie Lane's poor singing skills, and Peter Purves reluctantly agreed, having had some experience singing at the London Palladium. He was unhappy with the scripts and disliked having to sing the ballad out of key. Hartnell, Purves, and Lane felt Tucker was more focused on the guest cast than them, though Lane enjoyed the serial's comedic aspects. Tucker recalled that Hartnell enjoyed working with him instead of the recent unexperienced directors.

From The Gunfighters, cast lists in Radio Times began to be sorted in order of appearance instead of billing order. Casting interviews began in February 1966. Lloyd suggested to Tucker that the supporting cast should be London-based American actors or English actors with authentic accents; most roles were ultimately filled by British actors lacking experience with American accents, granting the serial a comedic vibe instead of a traditional adventure. Donald Sutherland and Patrick Troughton were among the first choices to portray Wyatt Earp and Johnny Ringo, respectively, but were busy with other commitments; later in the year, Troughton debuted as the Second Doctor, Hartnell's successor in the title role. The serial's principal guest star, Laurence Payne, was cast as Ringo; (Note: Other actors considered for Ringo included Victor Carin (who was cast as Virgil Earp), John Carson, and Philip Madoc.) he had worked with Tucker on an adaptation of The Three Musketeers (1954) and the miniseries A Farewell to Arms (1966).

John Alderson was cast as Wyatt Earp, having been suggested by production assistant Tristan de Vere Cole, while Anthony Jacobs was cast as Doc Holliday for his vocal skills, having worked with Tucker several times as well as extensively for BBC Radio. His children were fans of the programme; his son Matthew, who, then ten years old, operated the wall flap in the second episode, subsequently wrote and produced Doctor Who's 1996 television film. David Graham, who voiced the Daleks in Doctor Who at the time, portrayed the bartender Charlie; he accent was a blend of his work on Four Feather Falls (1960) and Fireball XL5 (1962–1963), inspired by Walter Brennan's voice. To avoid rehiring Graham for a single scene, an extra, John Caesar, acted as a body double for Charlie in the fourth episode. Graham later expressed his joy at playing Charlie, considering the character well-written.

Richard Beale (who portrayed Bat Masterson) (Note: Other actors considered to play Bat Masterson included John Bryans, Reed de Rouen (who was cast as Pa Clanton), and John Tate.) had voiced a character in the serial The Ark; Alderson stayed with Beale while working on The Gunfighters. Reed de Rouen (Pa Clanton) had previously worked with Tucker and Purves, while Martyn Huntley (Warren Earp) had worked with Tucker in A Farewell to Arms and appeared in the Doctor Who serials The Sensorites (1964) and The Dalek Invasion of Earth. Maurice Good improvised Phineas Clanton's stutter; it was not present in the scripts. Victor Carin (Virgil Earp) had limited availability for the serial, missing all four read-throughs. The character of Kate Fisher was loosely based on Kate Elder. Several actresses were considered for the role, (Note: Other actresses considered for the role of Kate included Carol Cleveland, Patricia English, Delena Kidd, Delphi Lawrence, Sue Lloyd, Jill Melford, and Anita West.) which went to Sheena Marshe. She was present at the serial's first music recording session but tests determined that her voice was not right for "The Ballad of the Last Chance Saloon".

=== Filming ===
Early 35 mm filming took place on Stages 3A and 3B at Ealing Studios from 28 to 31 March 1966; it had originally been scheduled at Riverside Studios but Ealing was considered more suitable for horses. The horses encountered difficulties trotting due to the use of sawdust to simulate sand. 35 mm film was used for several action scenes that benefited from rapid intercutting. Rehearsals for the serial started on 11 April, and weekly recording began on 15 April. The first episode was recorded at Television Centre Studio 4, instead of Riverside's Studio 1 as originally scheduled, due to double booking with Death is a Good Living; the remaining episodes were filmed at Riverside as planned. An additional camera was positioned atop a 10-foot-tall (300 cm) tower for high-angle shots to capture the action in the first three episodes.

Gunshot sound effects were played using tapes and records in the first two episodes. Rehearsals for the last two episodes were delayed due to the late arrival of the prop guns; a complaint was registered regarding armourer Jack Lennox. A small crew—Tucker, a cameraman, and an extra, John Raven—filmed the serial's final scene (leading into the next story) in 35 mm at the Callow Hill Sandpit in Virginia Water, Surrey, on 1 May. The final episode was recorded on 6 May; extensive earlier 35 mm filming meant principal recording finished ahead of time. The first episode was budgeted at £3,205 but cost more, while the rest were budgeted at £2,575 but cost less; recording cost a total of £10,415 (Note: The four episodes cost £4,065, £2,142, £2,196, and £2,012, respectively.) (equivalent to £169,000 in 2025). The episodes were edited a day later than originally scheduled as one of the BBC's videotape machines had broken down.

== Reception ==
=== Broadcast and ratings ===
Episode	Title	Run time	Original release date	UK viewers (millions)	Appreciation Index
1	"A Holiday for the Doctor"	23:48	30 April 1966	6.5	45
2	"Don't Shoot the Pianist"	23:47	7 May 1966	6.6	39
3	"Johnny Ringo"	24:42	14 May 1966	6.2	36
4	"The O.K. Corral"	23:53	21 May 1966	5.7	30

The Gunfighters was broadcast on BBC1 in four weekly parts from 30 April to 21 May 1966, as the third season's 34th to 37th episodes; the third was scheduled five minutes later than usual due to the Final of the FA Cup. Viewership expectedly dropped as the programme entered the summer months, seeing a significant drop from the previous serial, The Celestial Toymaker. There was a myth that The Gunfighters had Doctor Who's lowest-ever viewership figures; it saw the season's lowest figures to date with an average of 6.25 million viewers across the four episodes, but the following two serials dropped further. It was the last serial of Doctor Who's original run to have individual episode titles, and "The O.K. Corral" was the last regular episode given an individual title until "Rose" (2005); from The Savages, each serial had an overall title divided into numbered parts.

John Cura resumed taking tele-snaps of Doctor Who with the first episode of The Gunfighters, having not been contracted to do so under John Wiles's tenure as producer. The serial was sold overseas from the mid-1960s; (Note: It was broadcast in Australia from January 1967 and April 1968; Barbados in April 1968; Zambia in July 1968; Sierra Leone in March 1971; Singapore in March 1973; the United States from September 1985; Canada in the 1990s; and New Zealand in August 2000.) some cuts were required for the Australian broadcasts, particularly of shots of dead bodies. The 405-line videotape of the first episode was cleared for wiping on 17 August 1967 and subsequently erased, while the remaining three episodes were likely wiped before 1970. The BBC Film and Videotape Library retained a 16 mm print of the fourth episode, and BBC Enterprises's negatives of all four episodes were discovered in the 1970s. The serial was broadcast in episodic and compilation formats on UK Gold in December 1992 and January 1993.

=== Critical response ===
The Stage and Television Today's Bill Norris called the serial's concept "plain foolish", criticising the costumes and lacklustre setting, though he complimented Graham and Marshe's performances. The serial was criticised by Junior Points of View viewers and an Audience Research Report; the latter admonished the violence, accents, and scripts, though Hartnell and Jacobs's performances were praised. The Appreciation Index scores were low: the second episode's rating of 39 tied as the programme's lowest (with The Daleks' Master Plan's seventh episode), surpassed by the third episode's 36 and the fourth's 30—Doctor Who's lowest ever score, far lower than the average and dipping below the production office's graph for the only time. Sydney Newman, the programme's co-creator and BBC's head of drama, felt the "sad serial" was performed and filmed effectively but ill-conceived, criticising the ballad and its vocals.

The Gunfighters was considered among the worst stories of Hartnell's era and the programme overall, though its reputation has improved over time, particularly after its home media releases as audiences were no longer reliant on memories and anecdotal responses; Doctor Who Magazine (DWM) readers ranked it the worst First Doctor story (and the tenth-worst story overall) in 1998 but it increased over the years, (Note: Of the First Doctor's 29 stories, The Gunfighters was voted 29th in 1998 (151st of 159 overall), 26th in 2009 (175th of 200), 24th in 2014 (202nd of 241), and 21st in 2023.) up eight places in 2023. The poor response resulted in historical Doctor Who stories being phased out. Ramie Tateishi partly attributed the negative response to the period's biases against Americanisation and commercialism, while John Kenneth Muir cited the historical inaccuracies and its "silly" nature and DWM's Vanessa Bishop felt it was simply due to fans' dislike of "cowboy stories".

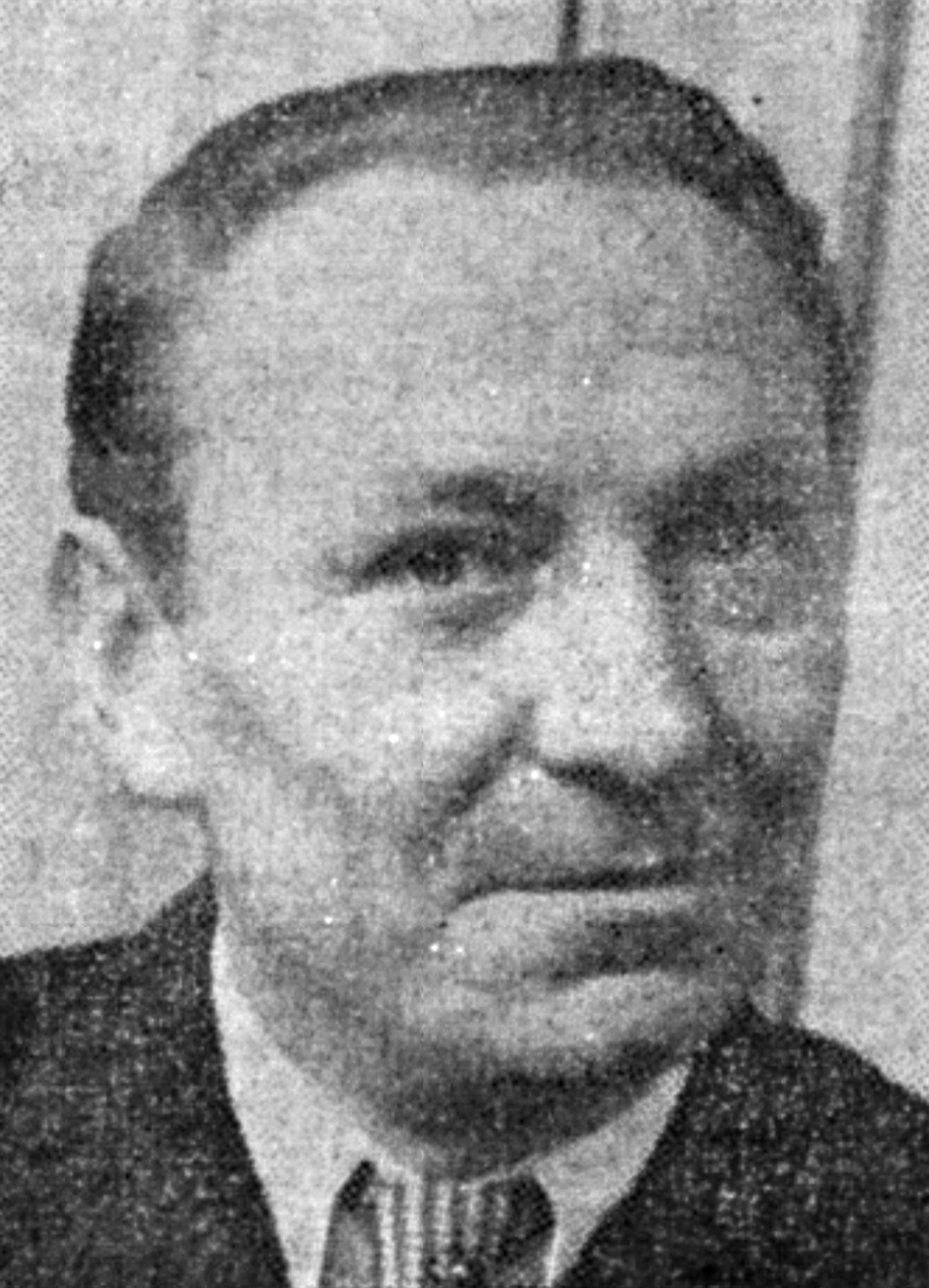
William Hartnell's performance in The Gunfighters was praised for his comedic timing.

Several retrospective reviewers lauded Newbery's set design for effectively evoking a western atmosphere but criticised the poor American accents and the overuse of "The Ballad of the Last Chance Saloon"; conversely, some critics appreciated the comedic lyrics and narrative relevance of the ballad, which Mark Campbell considered an effective framing device and counterpoint to the brutal action scenes. Hartnell was praised for his comedic performance; DVD Talk's John Sinnott considered him "at the top of his form" and DWM's Gary Gillatt called it "one of his finest performances". Critics lauded Purves and Jacobs's roles; IGN's Arnold T. Blumberg called the latter the standout, though Sinnott criticised the former's overacting.

Mark Clapham, Eddie Robson, and Jim Smith called the serial "smart, slick and consistently very funny", praising Tucker's direction and cinematography, and Payne's performance "for remaining a credible threat in a comic story". Radio Times's Mark Braxton enjoyed the use of horses and crowds but criticised the costumes and unrealistic gunfights, comparing it to a comedic Zucker, Abrahams, and Zucker film. Paul Cornell, Martin Day, and Keith Topping of The Discontinuity Guide (1995) called the serial "a comic masterpiece". Den of Geek's James Peaty favourably compared the story to William Shakespeare's The Comedy of Errors, calling the serial "in many ways the epitome of ambitious, intelligent and, most importantly, funny Doctor Who". Graeme Burk similarly named The Gunfighters "one of the best and smartest Doctor Who stories ever made", lauding the comedic elements in Cotton's scripts, Tucker's direction, and Hartnell's performance.

DWM's Bishop praised Tucker's direction and the sense of scale, particularly in the first episode's intense ending, while Gillatt felt the early comedy "fell flat" after character deaths as the story takes itself seriously, though called Dodo's fight with Holliday "her best-ever scene". David J. Howe and Stephen James Walker enjoyed the writing of some characters, like Holliday and Wyatt Earp, though criticised Kate, Billy, and the confusing later episodes, calling the serial among "the least effective of the Hartnell era". IGN's Blumberg lauded the story's ambition, costumes, and cinematography, and The Independent's Neela Debnath praised the comedic exaggeration in Cotton's scripts, assisted by the ballad and the companions' excitement of the setting.

== Commercial releases ==
The Gunfighters
- Author: Donald Cotton
- Cover artist: Andrew Skilleter
- Series: Doctor Who book: Target novelisations
- Release number: 101
- Publisher: Target Books
- Publication date: 9 January 1986
- ISBN: 0-426-20195-7

A novelisation of The Gunfighters was written by Cotton from the perspective of Holliday recounting the events of Tombstone to journalist Ned Buntline, incorporating more factual historical elements. It was published in hardback by W. H. Allen on 11 July 1985, and in paperback by Target Books on 9 January 1986, with a cover by Andrew Skilleter. Skilleter's cover was issued as an A4 print in September 2011, and was included in Who Dares Publishing's 2017 calendar. W. H. Allen published the book in a collection alongside The Myth Makers in August 1988. An unabridged reading of the book was published by AudioGO on 7 February 2013, with narration by Shane Rimmer.

The serial's audio was released on CD by BBC Audiobooks in February 2007, with narration by (and an interview with) Purves and the full version of "The Ballad of the Last Chance Saloon"; it was included, alongside digital copies of the original scripts, in The Lost TV Episodes: Collection 6 by AudioGO in September 2013. Excerpts from the ballad were released as part of Doctor Who: The 50th Anniversary Collection, released by Silva Screen Records as a four-CD set in December 2013 and eleven-CD set in November 2014.

The Gunfighters was released on VHS by BBC Video as part of The First Doctor box set in November 2002, and on DVD by 2 Entertainment as part of the Earth Story set (alongside The Awakening) in June 2011, featuring documentaries and audio commentaries. Some critics questioned the decision to pair The Gunfighters with The Awakening due to their lack of connections, though the restoration, documentaries, and other bonus features were praised. The Gunfighters was added to BBC iPlayer on 1 November 2023 alongside most other serials.

Harlequin Miniatures released a figurine of Holliday in 1999.

== Bibliography ==
- Brunt, David (10 May 2024). The Doctor Who Production Diary: The Hartnell Years. Telos Publishing. ISBN 978-1-845-83222-3.
- Burk, Graeme; Smith?, Robert (2013). Who's 50: The 50 Doctor Who Stories to Watch Before You Die. ECW Press. ISBN 978-1-770-41166-1.
- Campbell, Mark (2010). Doctor Who: The Episode Guide. Pocket Essentials. ISBN 978-1-84243-660-8.
- Chapman, James (2014). "Fifty Years in the TARDIS: The Historical Moments of Doctor Who". Critical Studies in Television. 9 (1): 43–61. doi:10.7227/CST.9.1.4. ISSN 1749-6020.
- Chapman, James (2006). Inside the TARDIS: The Worlds of Doctor Who (2013 ed.). I.B. Tauris. ISBN 978-1-780-76140-4.
- Clapham, Mark; Robson, Eddie; Smith, Jim (2005). Who's Next: An Unofficial Guide to Doctor Who. Virgin Books. ISBN 978-0-753-50948-7.
- Cornell, Paul; Day, Martin; Topping, Keith (1995). The Discontinuity Guide. London: Virgin Books. ISBN 0-426-20442-5.
- Haining, Peter (1983). Doctor Who: A Celebration – Two Decades Through Time and Space. W.H. Allen. ISBN 0-491-03351-6.
- Harmes, Marcus K. (2014). Doctor Who and the Art of Adaptation. Rowman & Littlefield. ISBN 978-1-442-23284-6.
- Hewett, Richard (23 July 2020). "Who's in Charge?: Changing Character Agency in Early Doctor Who". International Journal of TV Serial Narratives. 6 (1): 5–16. doi:10.6092/issn.2421-454X/9805. ISSN 2421-454X.
- Howe, David J.; Walker, Stephen James (2013). Doctor Who: The Television Companion. Vol. 1 (2021 ed.). London: Telos Publishing. ISBN 978-1-845-83156-1.
- Howe, David J.; Walker, Stephen James; Stammers, Mark (2005). Doctor Who: The Handbook. Vol. 1 (2016 ed.). London: Telos Publishing. ISBN 978-1-845-83941-3.
- Murray, Amanda (1997). "Pertwee". In Cornell, Paul (ed.). Licence Denied: Rumblings from the Doctor Who Underground. Virgin Books. pp. 21–28. ISBN 0-7535-0104-X.
- Muir, John Kenneth (1999). A Critical History of Doctor Who on Television. Jefferson, North Carolina: McFarland & Company. ISBN 978-0-786-40442-1.
- Newman, Kim (2005). Doctor Who. British Film Institute. ISBN 1-84457-090-8.
- October, Dene (2017). "Journeys through Cathay: Remediation and Televisuality in Marco Polo". In Fleiner, Carey; October, Dene (eds.). Doctor Who and History: Critical Essays on Imagining the Past. Jefferson, North Carolina: McFarland & Company. pp. 13–34. ISBN 978-1-476-66656-3.
- Robb, Brian J. (2013). Timeless Adventures: How Doctor Who Conquered TV. Kamera Books. ISBN 978-1-843-44156-4.
- Smith, Paul MC (July 2021). Based on the Popular BBC Television Serial (4th ed.). Wonderful Books. Archived from the original on 19 August 2022.
- Stanish, Deborah (13 November 2012). "Anything Goes". In Stanish, Deborah; Myles, L.M. (eds.). Chicks Unravel Time: Women Journey Through Every Season of Doctor Who. Mad Norwegian Press. pp. 224–230. ISBN 978-1-935-23412-8.
- Tateishi, Ramie (2017). "History as Genre, Aesthetic and Context in The Gunfighters". In Fleiner, Carey; October, Dene (eds.). Doctor Who and History: Critical Essays on Imagining the Past. Jefferson, North Carolina: McFarland & Company. pp. 78–91. ISBN 978-1-476-66656-3.
- Wright, Mark, ed. (7 September 2016). "The Savages, The War Machines, The Smugglers and The Tenth Planet". Doctor Who: The Complete History. 8 (27). London: Panini Comics, Hachette Partworks. ISSN 2057-6048.
- Wright, Mark, ed. (13 June 2018). "The Massacre of St Bartholomew's Eve, The Ark, The Celestial Toymaker and The Gunfighters". Doctor Who: The Complete History. 7 (73). London: Panini Comics, Hachette Partworks: 106–131. ISSN 2057-6048.

=== Home media resources ===
- Brunt, David (compiler) (2011). The Gunfighters (Production Information Subtitles). 2 Entertain.
