= Michael Leeston-Smith =

British film and television director

John Michael Bazalgette Leeston-Smith (12 December 1916 – 5 December 2001) was a British film and television director.

Leeston-Smith took a job at Ealing Studios in 1932, aged 16. He worked there as a photographer and assistant sound engineer. In 1938 he was sent by the BBC to their studios in Daventry.

During the Second World War, Leeston-Smith was part of the Royal Horse Artillery. After the war, he got a job at Alexandra Palace studios. In 1953, he took a job as a sound engineer on the BBC Television serial The Quatermass Experiment and two years later was a production assistant on the sequel, Quatermass II. In the 1960s, Leeston-Smith started work as a director. He directed a number of episodes of Z-Cars, R3 and the Doctor Who serial The Myth Makers. After a period as a freelance director, Leeston-Smith moved to South Africa in 1973 to work for the SABC when it was starting up its television broadcasts. He died in December 2001 at the age of 84.
