= The Myth Makers =

020 – The Myth Makers
- Doctor Who serial
- A production still of the Trojan Horse outside Troy, with the Doctor and Greeks inside (Note: No broadcast images from the original serial exist, leaving only production stills and an off-air audio recording.)

Cast
- Doctor: William Hartnell – First Doctor
- Companions: Maureen O'Brien – Vicki; Peter Purves – Steven Taylor; Adrienne Hill – Katarina
- Others: Max Adrian – King Priam; Cavan Kendall – Achilles; Alan Haywood – Hector; Barrie Ingham – Paris; Frances White – Cassandra; James Lynn – Troilus; Francis de Wolff – Agamemnon; Jack Melford – Menelaus; Tutte Lemkow – Cyclops; Ivor Salter – Odysseus; Jon Luxton – Messenger

Production
- Directed by: Michael Leeston-Smith
- Written by: Donald Cotton
- Script editor: Donald Tosh
- Produced by: John Wiles
- Music by: Humphrey Searle
- Production code: U
- Series: Season 3
- Running time: 4 episodes, 25 minutes each
- Episode(s) missing: All episodes
- First broadcast: 16 October 1965
- Last broadcast: 6 November 1965

Chronology
← Preceded by "Mission to the Unknown"	Followed by → The Daleks' Master Plan

The Myth Makers is the third serial of the third season of the British science fiction television series Doctor Who. Written by Donald Cotton and directed by Michael Leeston-Smith, the serial was broadcast on BBC1 in four weekly parts from 16 October to 6 November 1965. In the serial, based on Homer's Iliad, the First Doctor (William Hartnell) and his travelling companions Vicki (Maureen O'Brien) and Steven (Peter Purves) land in Troy during the Trojan War. The Doctor is captured by the Greeks and forced to formulate a plan for taking the city, while Steven and Vicki are captured by the Trojans and forced to devise a means of banishing the Greeks; the latter duo meet Katarina (Adrienne Hill), who becomes a companion by the serial's end.

After assuming their positions as story editor and producer in the third season, Donald Tosh and John Wiles wanted to take Doctor Who in new directions, moving towards historical stories and experimenting with humour. Cotton had written several pieces about Greek mythology for BBC Third Programme and elected to make his Doctor Who story about the Trojan Horse. He used several resources to research historical facts. The Myth Makers marked the final appearance of O'Brien as Vicki, a decision made by Wiles during the production break. Hill was cast as new companion Katarina, and made her first appearance in the serial. The Myth Makers was the first serial of the show's third production block. Recording took place at Riverside Studios from September to October 1965.

The Myth Makers received an average of 8.35 million viewers across the four episodes, a drop from earlier in the season but comparable to the previous year. Contemporary and retrospective reviews were generally positive, with praise for the performances and script, though some viewers were confused by the lack of continuation from the previous episode, "Mission to the Unknown". The videotapes of the serial were wiped by the BBC in the late 1960s, and it remains missing; a complete off-air audio recording of the serial survives, as well as some brief extracts recorded on 8 mm film, which have been released on DVD. The story was novelised by Cotton, and its off-air recording has been used for its release as an audiobook.

== Plot ==
The TARDIS materialises outside the city of Troy, distracting the Trojan Hector (Alan Haywood), son of King Priam (Max Adrian). Greek warrior Achilles (Cavan Kendall) takes advantage and kills him. When the Doctor (William Hartnell) emerges, Achilles believes him to be Zeus in disguise, and brings him to the Greek encampment along with the warrior Odysseus (Ivor Salter). Greek leader Agamemnon (Francis de Wolff) insists the Doctor help them fight the Trojans. Meanwhile, the Doctor's companions Vicki (Maureen O'Brien) and Steven (Peter Purves) remain in the TARDIS. Steven goes alone to try to find the Doctor, but is captured by Odysseus and taken to the Greek camp. Pretending to be Zeus, the Doctor persuades the Greeks to spare Steven.

Priam's son Paris (Barrie Ingham) takes the TARDIS into Troy. Priam's daughter, the prophet Cassandra (Frances White), denounces it as dangerous and demands it be burnt. Before the fire is lit, Vicki emerges from the TARDIS, taken as a sign from the gods. She is renamed Cressida and made a court favourite, enraging Cassandra, who believes Vicki to be a rival prophet, though her handmaiden Katarina (Adrienne Hill) defends Vicki. Priam sends Paris out to avenge Hector, but Steven adopts the identity Diomedes and persuades the Greeks to send him instead, hoping to search for Vicki. When he arrives, Vicki greets him with his real name, which Cassandra sees as a sign they are both spies; they are taken to cells. Priam's youngest son Troilus (James Lynn) visits Vicki. She persuades him to try to get them released, and they begin to fall in love.

Priam has Vicki released, and she frees Steven. Troilus kills Achilles to avenge Hector. At the Doctor's proposal, the Greeks pretend to sail away, leaving a wooden horse outside Troy as acknowledgement of defeat. Paris brings the horse into the city. At nightfall, the Greeks and the Doctor exit the horse and open the city gates, allowing the Greek army to enter and battle. As the fighting rages, the Doctor finds Vicki. Priam and Paris are slain, and Cassandra taken prisoner. Katarina finds Steven badly wounded and helps him return to the TARDIS. Vicki leaves the Doctor, anxious to find Troilus; outside the doomed city, they declare their love for each other and flee. The Doctor dematerialises the TARDIS with Steven and Katarina on board, hoping to land somewhere to attend to Steven's injuries.

== Production ==
=== Conception and writing ===
After assuming the position of story editor in April 1965, Donald Tosh wanted Doctor Who to expand creatively, such as experimenting with horror and humour elements within historical stories. Tosh was soon joined by new producer John Wiles, and they immediately developed a positive working relationship, wanting the show to move away from "childish" science fantasy and towards more historical stories and adult science-fiction, the latter inspired by authors Ray Bradbury and Isaac Asimov. As the first three stories of his tenure—The Time Meddler, Galaxy 4, and "Mission to the Unknown"—had been commissioned by his predecessor Dennis Spooner, The Myth Makers was the first serial for which Tosh assumed full control. He contacted Donald Cotton—whom he had known since the latter was a student at Guildhall School of Music and Drama—and invited him to submit a story idea for Doctor Who. Cotton was initially hesitant as it was an unusual field for him, but agreed if he could select the subject matter (the Trojan Horse) and some of the crew (which included his colleagues from BBC Third Programme), requests with which Tosh and Wiles were satisfied. Cotton had written several pieces about Greek mythology for Third Programme, prompting the similar subject matter for Doctor Who. Tosh remained wary of Cotton's ability, as he knew of the writer's inexperience with television drama; prior to a script commission, Tosh requested a storyline in late April 1965.

Cotton used several resources to research historical facts, including The Cambridge Ancient History, A History of Greece to 322 B.C. by N. G. L. Hammond, The Origins of Greek Civilization by Chester Starr, and A Companion to Greek Studies by Leonard Whibley; he noted several inconsistencies between the texts and that several of the Greek names in them (and in Homer's Iliad) were corrupted variations of their true Greek form. Cotton wrote that the Trojan Horse was "almost certainly completely myth" but found it compelling to include within the script with the Doctor's involvement. Tosh officially commissioned the first two episodes of the serial—then titled Doctor Who and the Mythmakers—on 13 May, with a target delivery date of 4 June; the last two episodes were commissioned on 11 June, with the serial now titled The Myth-Makers. Tosh described the story as "high comedy"—a term used later in publicity material—and was excited for its humour and sophistication. Documentation in mid-July listed the serial as Dr Who & the Trojans. The episode titles changed over time, especially as the BBC vetoed Cotton's use of puns in the titles: the first episode was originally "Deus ex Machina", and the fourth was once called "Is There a Doctor in the Horse?" before Wiles apparently demanded it be changed. Cotton recalled that the third episode's title, "Death of a Spy", was forced on him after the script had been written, requiring him to introduce the character Cyclops. (Note: According to Wright (2017), evidence of the serial's early storyline contradicts Cotton's statement.)

Derek Martinus—who had directed the two previous serials, Galaxy 4 and "Mission to the Unknown"—was discussed as a possible director of The Myth Makers in June 1965, though the role was ultimately assigned to BBC staff director Michael Leeston-Smith. It was his only work for the show, though Wiles later wrote to him in hopes that they would collaborate again. Upon visiting the British Museum to research Trojan architecture, designer John Wood found their building style simplistic, generally carved from large stone pieces. Costume supervisor Daphne Dare was deputised by Tony Pearce for the first episode, while Elizabeth Blattner replaced regular make-up designer Sonia Markham for the first two episodes. Cotton brought composer Humphrey Searle from Third Programme to write music for the serial; he conducted a group of eight musicians from the Sinfonia of London—who had previously produced music for Cotton's Greek trilogy on Third Programme—to provide about 14 minutes of music cues, significantly consisting of guitar and horns.

=== Casting and characters ===
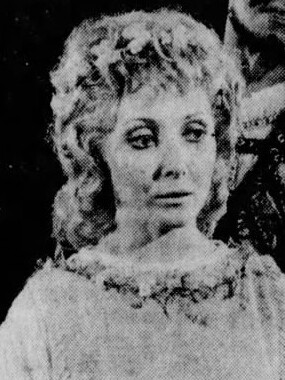
The Myth Makers marked the final appearance of Maureen O'Brien as Vicki.

On 21 May 1965, Maureen O'Brien and Peter Purves were contracted in their roles until the end of The Myth Makers. During the production break after the filming of Galaxy 4 and "Mission to the Unknown", Wiles had decided to renew Purves's contract for a further 20 episodes, while not renewing O'Brien's, having witnessed arguments regarding her dialogue in rehearsals for Galaxy 4; he informed them on 3 September. O'Brien was shocked, as she had returned from holiday expecting to maintain her regular role; however, she was ultimately glad to move on, as she had disliked the role and scripts. Rewriting was required for Vicki's departure and the introduction of a replacement character, as Vicki had already been written into the script for the next serial, The Daleks' Master Plan.

On 9 September, Adrienne Hill was contracted to play Katarina in five episodes, beginning with the final part of The Myth Makers; she was cast by the production team of The Daleks' Master Plan. Hill had previously auditioned for the role of Joanna in The Crusade (1965), which went to Jean Marsh, who later replaced Hill as companion Sara Kingdom in The Daleks' Master Plan. By the time Hill recorded The Myth Makers, the decision had already been taken not to continue with the character and she had pre-filmed Katarina's death for the following serial.

Cotton brought actor Max Adrian to play King Priam. Playing Odysseus and Menelaus, respectively, Ivor Salter and Jack Melford had worked with Leeston-Smith on Thorndyke in 1964. Veteran actor Francis de Wolff was cast as Agamemnon, having previously portrayed Vasor in the Doctor Who serial The Keys of Marinus (1964). Adrian and de Wolff became irritated by Hartnell's difficulties remembering lines, while Hartnell was jealous and fearful of being upstaged by the actors, a concern with which he approached Wiles. Barrie Ingham, who portrayed Paris, had portrayed Alydon in the film Dr. Who and the Daleks some months earlier. Frances White was cast as Cassandra, but her name was omitted from all publicity; some sources claim White asked Wiles to omit her name from the cast listings in Radio Times, but she has no memory of this and said she was proud of her role and "quite cross" about her omission. Mike Reid, who was later known as a comedian and for his role in EastEnders, appeared in a non-speaking role as a Greek soldier.

=== Filming ===
Early model filming for The Myth Makers took place at Frensham Ponds, close to Leeston-Smith's home. 35 mm filming took place on 27 August 1965, depicting the serial's two major fight sequences; during filming, Haywood and Kendall were grazed, and some of the latter's scenes were refilmed on 30 August. The following day, Lynn cut his hand during production, which required additional refilming. For filming on 2 September, a model of Troy was filmed on location using the Schüfftan process, with a one-way mirror giving the impression of actors moving within the set; Wood's team built the model in a little more than a week to make it appear "hurried". Additional model shots were filmed at Ham Polo Club around 3 September.

Weekly rehearsals for The Myth Makers began on 13 September at the North Kensington Community Centre. By this time, Wiles had fully taken over from his predecessor, the show's original producer Verity Lambert, which, alongside O'Brien's departure, greatly upset Hartnell. Further upset came from the death of Hartnell's aunt Bessie, the only person from his childhood to whom he was close; the production schedule prevented him from attending her funeral. Weekly recording began on 17 September at Studio 1 of Riverside Studios. During camera rehearsals for the first episode, Hartnell was struck by a camera, leaving his left shoulder bruised. The final episode was recorded on 8 October. Recording for the four episodes cost a total of £10,214 (Note: The four episodes cost £3,327, £2,566, £2,230, and £2,091, respectively.) (equivalent to £172,924 in 2025).

== Reception ==
=== Broadcast and ratings ===
Episode	Title	Run time	Original release date	UK viewers (millions)	Appreciation Index
1	"Temple of Secrets"^{†}	24:45	16 October 1965	8.3	48
2	"Small Prophet, Quick Return"^{†}	24:43	23 October 1965	8.1	51
3	"Death of a Spy"^{†}	25:39	30 October 1965	8.7	49
4	"Horse of Destruction"^{†}	24:25	6 November 1965	8.3	52

^† Episode is missing

The Myth Makers was broadcast on BBC1 in four weekly parts from 16 October to 6 November 1965. Continuing the trend from "Mission to the Unknown", viewership dropped significantly from Galaxy 4, but it was comparable to Planet of Giants (1964), which had aired around the same time the previous year. The serial received an average of 8.35 million viewers across its four weeks. The Appreciation Index for the serial was considered low, dropping below 50 for the first and third episodes. The serial was sold extensively overseas in the late 1960s and early 1970s, including to Australia, Barbados, New Zealand, Sierra Leone, Singapore, and Zambia; it was no longer available for purchase from BBC Enterprises by 1974, and Australia returned its film prints in June 1975. The original 405-line tapes for the second, third, and fourth episodes were wiped on 17 August 1967, and the first was wiped on 31 January 1969. A complete audio recording of the serial survives, as well as some brief extracts recorded on 8 mm film from the Australian transmission.

=== Critical response ===
At the BBC Programme Review Board after the serial's broadcast, the general consensus (led by BBC1 controller Michael Peacock) was that it was "too brutal", and head of light entertainment Tom Sloan felt the finale was "far above the heads of child audiences"; in response, Sydney Newman, Doctor Who co-creator and BBC head of drama, said that concerns about the programme's violence had been addressed. An Audience Research Report received mixed responses, with confusion that the storyline from "Mission to the Unknown" had not immediately continued; the performances and production were considered mediocre, though some viewers welcomed the added humour and the historical setting.

Trevor Wayne in 1982 described the characterisation as "generally weak and superficial", highlighting Salter's performance as the strongest. Conversely, in 1986, Mark Wyman praised most performances, particularly Ingham, and applauded Searle's score for its innovation and sophistication. Paul Cornell, Martin Day, and Keith Topping of The Discontinuity Guide (1995) wrote "the whole thing feels uneasy" despite effective performances. In The Television Companion (1998), David J. Howe and Stephen James Walker praised Wood's sets and Vicki's "poignant and well written departure scene". In A Critical History of Doctor Who (1999), John Kenneth Muir noted the serial "appears to have featured some of the same style and wit" as The Romans (1965). Mark Braxton of Radio Times (2009) similarly compared it to The Romans, praising Vicki's departure and the performances of White, Ingham, Lemkow, and Salter. Paul Mount of Starburst (2021) lauded Cotton's "sophisticated" script and Adrian, de Wolff, and Ingham's performances, through described the serial as "a product of its era, a stagey, talky, clumpy cod-Shakespearean drama".

== Commercial releases ==
The Myth Makers
- Author: Donald Cotton
- Cover artist: Andrew Skilleter
- Series: Doctor Who book: Target novelisations
- Release number: 97
- Publisher: Target Books
- Publication date: 11 April 1985
- ISBN: 0-426-20170-1

Donald Cotton wrote the novelisation of The Myth Makers, told through the perspective of Homer; he enjoyed writing the novelisation, adding more humour than the episodes. The book was published by W. H. Allen on 11 April 1985, with a Target paperback on 12 September. The cover was designed by Andrew Skilleter. The novelisation was combined with Cotton's The Gunfighters (1966) for Doctor Who Classics, a series of books published by W. H. Allen imprint Star, in August 1988. An unabridged audiobook reading of the novelisation read by Stephen Thorne was released on 7 April 2008.

The off-air soundtrack of The Myth Makers was released as a CD in January 2001, narrated by Peter Purves. Alongside The Massacre (1966) and The Highlanders (1966–1967), it was included in Doctor Who: Adventures in History, a CD box set released by BBC Worldwide in August 2003. Surviving off-air clips from the serial were included on Lost in Time, released as a DVD box set by 2 Entertain in November 2004. The soundtrack was featured on the CD The Lost TV Episodes: Collection 1, released by BBC Audiobooks in August 2010; the set contained interviews and the original camera scripts. Demon Records released the soundtrack as a vinyl record in 2021.

== Bibliography ==
- Cornell, Paul; Day, Martin; Topping, Keith (1995). The Discontinuity Guide. London: Virgin Books. ISBN 0-426-20442-5.
- Howe, David J.; Walker, Stephen James (1998). Doctor Who: The Television Companion: Volume 1 (2021 ed.). London: BBC Books. ISBN 978-1-845-83156-1.
- Howe, David J.; Walker, Stephen James; Stammers, Mark (1994). The Handbook: The Unofficial and Unauthorised Guide to the Production of 'Doctor Who'. Vol. 1 (2016 ed.). London: Telos Publishing. ISBN 978-1-845-83941-3.
- Keen, Antony (2010). "It's about Tempus: Greece and Rome in "Classic" Doctor Who". In Wright, David C. Jr.; Austin, Allan W. (eds.). Space and Time: Essays on Vision of History in Science Fiction and Fantasy Television. Jefferson, North Carolina: McFarland & Company. pp. 100–115. ISBN 978-0-786-43664-4.
- Muir, John Kenneth (1999). A Critical History of Doctor Who on Television. Jefferson, North Carolina: McFarland & Company. ISBN 978-0-786-40442-1.
- Smith, Paul MC (July 2021). Based on the Popular BBC Television Serial (4th ed.). Wonderful Books. Archived from the original on 19 August 2022.
- Wright, Mark, ed. (2017). "Galaxy 4, Mission to the Unknown, The Myth Makers and The Daleks' Master Plan". Doctor Who: The Complete History. 6 (47). London: Panini Comics, Hachette Partworks. ISSN 2057-6048.
