= Victor Carin =

Scottish actor and director (1933–1981)

- Born: Vitorio Zaccarini; 1 October 1933; Aberdeen, Scotland
- Died: 2 January 1981 (aged 47); Balfron, Scotland
- Occupation: Actor

Victor Carin (1 October 1933 – 2 January 1981) was a Scottish actor, director, and translator, who wrote for radio, television, film, and the stage.

Carin was born in Aberdeen and grew up in Stonehaven in Kincardineshire. His mother was Scottish and his father was Italian. He took the stage name "Carin" from his birth name Zaccarini. Carin wrote in 1974 that he lived for a time in Italy "just after the war" and that part of his education included translating the works of Italian playwright Carlo Goldoni, as well as French plays, including works by Molière. He trained as an actor in London and returned to Scotland in 1958. He joined the Gateway Theatre Company in 1961 as an actor, giving strong performances as Pantites in Ada F. Kay's The Man from Thermopylae (1961) and in George Bernard Shaw's Pygmalion (1962). He became the company's director of productions in 1963 and remained in that role until the Gateway closed in 1965.

His television acting roles include Chief Inspector Menzies in Sutherland's Law, Inspector Mackenzie in Raffles, and Baron Lamond in the 1980 series Doom Castle. He portrayed Virgil Earp in the 1966 Doctor Who episode "The O.K. Corral". He appeared in the critically acclaimed 1971 BBC television adaptation of the novel Sunset Song as Chae Strachan.

Carin performed in multiple BBC radio productions, such as the 1963 radio play The Hammers of Fingal by Angus MacVicar, the 1964 serial Sanctuary Isle by Bill Knox, and the 1980 Radio Scotland production Smoke Screen by John Lawson.

Carin translated four plays into Scots. His first translation, The Hypochondriack (a translation of Molière's The Imaginary Invalid) was first presented at the Gateway Theatre in 1963. It was also produced at the Perth Theatre in 1977 and the Pitlochry Festival Theatre in 1991. Carin changed the names in the play to Scottish names. His second translation, The Servant o' Twa Maisters (translated from Carlo Goldoni's The Servant of Two Masters) was the Royal Lyceum Theatre Company's debut production in 1965. It was produced there again the following year and in 1977, and at the Perth Theatre in 1983. In 2009, it was produced at the Pitlochry Festival Theatre. Carin's version of the play is set in Edinburgh.

Carin's 1968 translation The Chippit Chantie (a translation of Heinrich von Kleist's The Broken Jug) debuted at the Royal Lyceum Theatre in 1968. It was produced at the Dundee Repertory Theatre in 1974 and the Perth Theatre in 1989. It was also presented in 2003 at St Serf's Hall, Goldenacre. Carin used an English intermediary text to create his version of the play and adapted it to take place in Scotland. In 1976, his translation A Muckle Steer (a translation of Ludvig Holberg's The Fidget) was produced at the Perth Theatre. Carin also used an English intermediary text for this translation and adapted the setting to Scotland.

Although Carin's native Scots was that of Kincardineshire and northeast Scotland, the language in his translation The Servant o' Twa Maisters is for the most part a standard central Scots, with older words and expressions appropriate for a late-eighteenth-century setting. In his book Scottish Literature's Debt to Italy, R. D. S. Jack noted that Carin's The Servant o' Twa Maisters changes the play to have Scottish character and place names, and that some conversations and pieces of stage business are added to the play to help convey the play's humour, but the basic plot is kept the same. Jack also stated that "Carin's Scots is pungent, snappy and heavily idiomatic. As a result his work is much less sophisticated than Goldoni's but if he loses some of the subtler moments of wit in the Italian original, there are plenty of forceful Scots idioms and exclamations to replace it. [...] Goldoni would have been much more appreciative of The Servant o' Twa Maisters for all its alterations and innovations than the much more timid English translations, which are usually the non-Italian speaker's introduction to this fine play."

Mr. Carin died of pancreatic cancer early in 1981. He is survived by a son, daughter and other family.
