= Donald Cotton =

British screenwriter (1928–1999)

- Born: Donald Henry Cotton; 26 April 1928; Shardlow, Derbyshire, England
- Died: 28 December 1999 (aged 71); Sussex, England
- Occupation: Writer

Donald Henry Cotton (26 April 1928 – 28 December 1999) was a British writer for radio and television during the black and white era. He also wrote numerous musical revues for the stage. His work often had a comedic bent.

== Early life ==
Cotton was born the son of Professor Harry Cotton (1889–1985), the head of electrical engineering at University College Nottingham for 31 years (1933–1954). He was educated at The Minster School, Southwell and then went on to university in Nottingham to study zoology. At the latter establishment, he became president of the students' entertainment committee. However, Cotton found the habits of humans more interesting than animals, so began to write songs and sketches about them.

== Theatre ==
Giving up zoological studies in favour of an acting career, Cotton was tutored at the Guildhall School of Music and Drama and was soon appearing at the Nottingham Playhouse. Early on in his career, he wrote and produced Pandarus, a musical of Troilus and Cressida. In 1952, he directed, produced and narrated the first London production of Igor Stravinsky's L'Histoire du soldat. Three years later, Cotton's first TV work, The Merry Christmas, a musical version of A Christmas Carol was aired on ITV. His only full London production was as writer of a Sweeney Todd-based musical entitled The Demon Barber at the Lyric Theatre (Hammersmith) in 1959.

== Early BBC career ==
Cotton's scripts for the BBC Third Programme include Echo and Narcissus (1959), The Golden Fleece and Stereologue (both 1962) and The Tragedy of Phaethon (1965, described as a comedy despite the name). In 1960, he introduced Voices in the Air, a programme whose script included work not only by Cotton but also by other notable contributors including Harold Pinter, John Betjeman, Michael Flanders, Antony Hopkins, N. F. Simpson, Donald Swann, and Sandy Wilson.

== Doctor Who scripts ==
=== "The Myth Makers" ===
In April 1965, Donald Tosh replaced Dennis Spooner as story editor on the popular BBC science fiction programme Doctor Who, and soon thereafter contacted Donald Cotton, an old acquaintance, to write for the programme. Tosh and incoming producer John Wiles were keen to push the boundaries of the programme, and felt that Cotton might be able to deliver a high comedy. His first script, The Myth Makers, a tongue-in-cheek historical based like several of his radio plays on Greek mythology, pushed comedic elements to the limit. Cotton's planned episode titles were altered due to BBC disapproval of the punning theme the author had devised for them. Only the original name for the second episode, Small Prophet, Quick Return survived at Tosh's insistence. William Hartnell is reputed to have been particularly unimpressed by the story and clashed with several members of the cast and crew during filming. None of the episodes of The Myth Makers still survive in the BBC Archives.

=== "The Gunfighters" ===
Tosh and Wiles were so pleased with his first serial that Donald Cotton was quickly asked to submit another idea for Doctor Who and on 30 November 1965 Cotton was commissioned to write The Gunfighters. The idea was that this would, again, be a humorous take on the historical story; this time, the target would be the American Wild West (a setting which William Hartnell would later claim to have suggested), and specifically the infamous Gunfight at the O.K. Corral, which took place on 26 October 1881. Eschewing detailed historical research, Cotton opted to hew closer to the version of the Gunfight which had passed into contemporary mythology, with Wyatt Earp as a stolid enforcer of the law and Doc Holliday as a rascally anti-hero. Once more, Cotton's scripts played fast and loose with other elements of true Wild West history.

To Cotton's chagrin, both Wiles and Tosh resigned from Doctor Who at the end of December 1965, to be replaced by producer Innes Lloyd and story editor Gerry Davis. Lloyd and Davis disliked the historical genre, believing that the viewing audience was more interested in science-fiction stories, and also felt that the comedic bent of The Gunfighters did not fit with their more serious vision of Doctor Who. For a time, the production team considered cancelling the story altogether and replacing it with Ian Stuart Black's The Savages, which would end up following Cotton's adventure into production. The production team's fears about the quality of The Gunfighters appeared to be borne out when the final three episodes equalled or exceeded the series' lowest Audience Appreciation scores to date. Indeed, The O.K. Corral episode, rating only 30%, would prove to be the all-time low-water mark for Doctor Who. These disastrous figures helped strengthen Lloyd's conviction that historical serials should be eliminated from Doctor Who altogether. This was not the only controversy surrounding The O.K. Corral: a dispute had arisen between director Rex Tucker and Lloyd over the editing of the episode, leading to Tucker requesting that his credit be excised.

=== "The Herdsmen of Aquarius" ===
The Gunfighters was Donald Cotton's last contribution to Doctor Who. Another submission entitled The Herdsmen of Aquarius (or The Herdsmen of Venus) was rejected by Gerry Davis in June 1966. It would have featured an "explanation" for the Loch Ness Monster, which the storyline explained away as livestock kept by aliens.

== Post-Doctor Who career ==
After helping to create Adam Adamant Lives!, Cotton mainly confined his attention to writing and performing for the stage, although he would also become a novelist and columnist. He helped Tony Snell write the satirical 1968 album Medieval & Latter Day Lays, also known as Englishman Abroad. He concluded his acting career at the Theatre Royal, Northampton, acting, writing and directing for the company (travelling there by donkey and cart since he never acquired a driving licence). In the 1980s, Cotton novelised his Doctor Who serials as well as The Romans for Target Books. For this, he took a comedic and unusual approach and presented them in the first person. His Romans adaptation takes the form of an epistolary novel told by, among other narrators, the Doctor's companion Ian Chesterton. The Gunfighters is told by Doc Holliday and has Johnny Ringo take the contract to kill the Earps in order to afford a copy of the Cambridge Encyclopedia of Classical Biography. He wrote a novel entitled Bodkin Papers in 1986.

== Writing credits ==
Production	Notes	Broadcaster
Five Guineas a Week	Short film (co-written with Martinson James and Donald Monat, 1956)	N/A
Doctor Who	"The Myth Makers" (1965); "The Gunfighters" (1966)	BBC1
Adam Adamant Lives!	"A Vintage Year for Scoundrels" (1966)	BBC1
