= List of Doctor Who audio releases =

There have been many official and unofficial Doctor Who and related spin-offs released on audio, as LPs, audiocassettes, audio CDs and MP3 CDs. Recordings here are listed by their original release date.

== Television soundtracks ==
In 1966, an abridged recording of episode 6 of The Chase was released with narration on a 7-inch record. In 1979, the BBC released an abridged version of Genesis of the Daleks. In 1992 a brief series began releasing audio versions of missing stories from the archives, with link narration provided by one of the actors who played the Doctor. The soundtracks that were known to exist at the time were not the optimal audio quality and the range only released a few stories. A second series of "Lost Episode" soundtrack releases began in 1999. This series differed from earlier releases by having "linking" narration (to describe action and other sequences that were originally visual) read by an actor or actress who had played a companion in the original serial, rather than one of the actors who played the Doctor (except The Macra Terror, which used the original narration by Colin Baker). Another difference is that all the later releases were remastered for release by Mark Ayres from tapes recorded "off-air" at the original time of broadcast, or, when necessary, due to quality and possibly availability, from surviving films. From 1999 to 2004, these recordings were released under the "BBC Radio Collection" banner, and, starting in 2004, they have been released under the "BBC Audio" banner, with different outer packaging. The series was officially completed in 2006 with the release of The Reign of Terror; however, a rerelease of the soundtrack for The Tomb of the Cybermen was produced and was followed by new audio productions of available serials. All have been released by the BBC unless otherwise noted. This list is in order by release date.

Story	Title	Doctor	Narrated by	Format	Company	Original release date
16	The Daleks	1st	David Graham	7-inch	Century 21 Records	April 1966
An abridged recording of "The Planet of Decision", Episode 6 of The Chase.
78	Genesis of the Daleks	4th	Tom Baker	LP	BBC Records	October 1979
An abridged version of the soundtrack. Tom Baker provides link narration in character as the 4th Doctor. Reissues: 7 November 1988 (cassette, along with Slipback, see below). 2 July 2001 (CD, in a revised and expanded version with Exploration Earth: The Time Machine -see below). 29 April 2010 (free CD with that day's edition of The Daily Telegraph newspaper). 3 February 2011 (CD in a "facsimile" edition of the original LP edit replicating the original LP artwork). 16 April 2016 (Blue vinyl LP released by Demon Records for Record Store Day)
34	The Macra Terror	2nd	Colin Baker	2-Cassette	BBC Audio Collection	July 1992
The narration is the same as later used on the 2000 CD edition but a poorer quality version of the original soundtrack was all that was available in 1992.
36	The Evil of the Daleks	2nd	Tom Baker	2-Cassette	BBC Audio Collection	July 1992
This release cut two scenes set in a coffee bar, in which music by The Seekers and The Beatles could be heard playing in the background. Unlike the releases of 1993, Tom Baker does not perform his narration "in character" as the Doctor.
37	The Tomb of the Cybermen	2nd	Jon Pertwee	2-cassette	BBC Audio Collection	June 1993
This release was prepared in 1991, when all 4 episodes were still missing from the BBC TV archives. When all 4 episodes were returned to the BBC in January 1992, the planned spring 1992 cassette release was cancelled, with a VHS of the serial being released in May 1992 instead. Due to contractual obligations, the cassette version of the serial with Jon Pertwee's link narration was finally released in June 1993.
30	The Power of the Daleks	2nd	Tom Baker	2-cassette	BBC Audio Collection	August 1993
Tom Baker performs his narration "in character" as the Doctor relating a past story in his life.
42	Fury from the Deep	2nd	Tom Baker	2-cassette	BBC Audio Collection	October 1993
Tom Baker performs his narration "in character" as the Doctor relating a past story in his life.
22	The Massacre of St Bartholomew's Eve	1st	Peter Purves	2-cassette, 2-CD	BBC Radio Collection	August 1999
This release also used The Massacre title on its spine, and was released on both CD and cassette, with this being the last story released on cassette. Reissues: 4 August 2003 (CD, Adventures in History box set with The Myth Makers and The Highlanders). 3 February 2011 (CD, in The Lost TV Episodes Collection Two: 1965–1966 boxset). 5 September 2019 (CD, in The Lost TV Episodes Collection Two boxset)
41	The Web of Fear	2nd	Frazer Hines	3-CD	BBC Radio Collection	March 2000
Reissues: 7 April 2003 (Mp3-CD with The Abominable Snowmen). 7 July 2003 (CD, Yeti Attack box set with The Abominable Snowmen). 2 August 2012 (CD, in The Lost TV Episodes Collection Five: 1967–1969 boxset)
18	Galaxy 4	1st	Peter Purves	2-CD	BBC Radio Collection	June 2000
Reissues: 5 August 2010 (CD, in The Lost TV Episodes Collection One: 1964–1965 boxset). 7 March 2019 (CD, in The Lost TV Episodes Collection One 1964-1965 boxset).
31	The Highlanders	2nd	Frazer Hines	2-CD	BBC Radio Collection	August 2000
Reissues: 4 August 2003 (CD, Adventures in History box set with The Myth Makers and The Massacre of St Bartholomew's Eve). 4 August 2011 (CD, in The Lost TV Episodes Collection Three: 1966–1967 boxset)
34	The Macra Terror	2nd	Colin Baker	2-CD	BBC Radio Collection	August 2000
The narration is the same as used on the 1992 audio cassette edition, and is a noticeably less detailed narration compared to the CD releases of all other stories. A better quality version of the original soundtrack is used compared to the 1992 cassette release.
20	The Myth Makers	1st	Peter Purves	2-CD	BBC Radio Collection	January 2001
Reissues: 4 August 2003 (CD, Adventures in History box set with The Highlanders and The Massacre of St Bartholomew's Eve). 5 August 2010 (CD, in The Lost TV Episodes Collection One: 1964–1965 boxset). 7 March 2019 (CD, in The Lost TV Episodes Collection One 1964-1965 boxset).
33	The Moonbase	2nd	Frazer Hines	2-CD	BBC Radio Collection	April 2001
Reissues: 4 August 2011 (CD, in The Lost TV Episodes Collection Three: 1966–1967 boxset)
24	The Celestial Toymaker	1st	Peter Purves	2-CD	BBC Radio Collection	April 2001
Reissues: 3 February 2011 (CD, in The Lost TV Episodes Collection Two: 1965–1966 boxset). 5 September 2019 (CD, in The Lost TV Episodes Collection Two boxset)
38	The Abominable Snowmen	2nd	Frazer Hines	2-CD	BBC Radio Collection	July 2001
Reissues: 7 April 2003 (Mp3-CD with The Web of Fear). 7 July 2003 (CD, Yeti Attack box set with The Web of Fear). 2 February 2012 (CD, in The Lost TV Episodes Collection Four: 1967 boxset)
19	The Daleks' Master Plan	1st	Peter Purves	5-CD	BBC Radio Collection	October 2001
021	The Daleks' Master Plan	1st	Peter Purves	5-CD	BBC Radio Collection	October 2001
Disc one contains "Mission to the Unknown" and also has a bonus data track, consisting of MP3 files of the episode soundtracks without narration, copies of the linking narration script in PDF format, and MP3 copies of sound clips before and after audio restoration. Reissues: 7 April 2003 (Mp3-CD). 3 February 2011 (CD, in The Lost TV Episodes Collection Two: 1965–1966 boxset). 5 September 2019 (CD, in The Lost TV Episodes Collection Two boxset)
35	The Faceless Ones	2nd	Frazer Hines	2-CD	BBC Radio Collection	February 2002
Reissues: 2 February 2012 (CD, in The Lost TV Episodes Collection Four: 1967 boxset)
28	The Smugglers	1st	Anneke Wills	2-CD	BBC Radio Collection	May 2002
Reissues: 4 August 2011 (CD, in The Lost TV Episodes Collection Three: 1966–1967 boxset)
40	The Enemy of the World	2nd	Frazer Hines	2-CD	BBC Radio Collection	August 2002
Reissues: 2 August 2012 (CD, in The Lost TV Episodes Collection Five: 1967–1969 boxset)
26	The Savages	1st	Peter Purves	2-CD	BBC Radio Collection	November 2002
Reissues: 3 February 2011 (CD, in The Lost TV Episodes Collection Two: 1965–1966 boxset). 5 September 2019 (CD, in The Lost TV Episodes Collection Two boxset)
49	The Space Pirates	2nd	Frazer Hines	2-CD	BBC Radio Collection	February 2003
Reissues: 2 August 2012 (CD, in The Lost TV Episodes Collection Five: 1967–1969 boxset)
4	Marco Polo	1st	William Russell	3-CD	BBC Radio Collection	November 2003
A printed bonus is an included map of Cathay (China) similar to the one originally shown on screen while Marco Polo narrates his travel journal and explaining historical inaccuracies between real locations and locations used in the serial. The first disc in the set contains data as well as audio; the data includes MP3 files of the soundtracks without additional narration, PDF files of the narration scripts, and computer wallpaper versions of the aforementioned map of Cathay. Reissues: 5 August 2010 (CD, in The Lost TV Episodes Collection One: 1964–1965 boxset). 7 March 2019 (CD, in The Lost TV Episodes Collection One 1964-1965 boxset).
30	The Power of the Daleks	2nd	Anneke Wills	2-CD	BBC Radio Collection	November 2003
Part of The Daleks limited tin release with The Evil of the Daleks and My Life as a Dalek. Reissues: 2 August 2004 (CD, individual release). 20 June 2005 (Reconstructed with John Cura's "tele-snaps" to illustrate the serial when played on a home computer). 4 August 2011 (CD, in The Lost TV Episodes Collection Three: 1966–1967 boxset)
36	The Evil of the Daleks	2nd	Frazer Hines	3-CD	BBC Radio Collection	November 2003
Part of The Daleks limited tin release with The Power of the Daleks and My Life as a Dalek. This was the first time that all the scenes from all seven episodes appeared unedited in audio form, with the exception of the Beatles song Paperback Writer being replaced by Hold Tight by Dave Dee, Dozy, Beaky, Mick & Tich in the second of the two scenes set in the coffee bar. The previous 1992 cassette release had to cut out both coffee bar scenes with songs from The Seekers and The Beatles playing in the background. This 2003 CD release got copyright clearance for the song Nobody Knows the Trouble I've Seen by The Seekers in the first coffee bar scene, but Mark Ayres discusses in a Doctor Who Magazine interview in issue 336 how a rights clearance for The Beatles song was not only unfeasible due to cost, but that the rights owner would not issue a clearance for an audiobook CD release under any circumstances. Mark goes on to describe how he painstakingly was able to use another song in the background instead, digitally inserting Hold Tight in place of Paperback Writer. Reissues: 2 August 2004 (CD, individual release). 2 February 2012 (CD, in The Lost TV Episodes Collection Four: 1967 boxset)
42	Fury from the Deep	2nd	Frazer Hines	2-CD	BBC Audio	February 2004
Reissues: 2 August 2012 (CD, in The Lost TV Episodes Collection Five: 1967–1969 boxset)
43	The Wheel in Space	2nd	Wendy Padbury	2-CD	BBC Audio	May 2004
Reissues: 2 August 2012 (CD, in The Lost TV Episodes Collection Five: 1967–1969 boxset)
29	The Tenth Planet	1st	Anneke Wills	2-CD	BBC Audio	November 2004
Released in the limited The Cybermen tin with The Invasion and The Origins of the Cybermen. Bonus interview with Anneke Wills. Reissues: 9 January 2006 (CD, individual release). 4 August 2011 (CD, in The Lost TV Episodes Collection Three: 1966–1967 boxset)
46	The Invasion	2nd	Frazer Hines	3-CD	BBC Audio	November 2004
Released in the limited The Cybermen tin with The Tenth Planet and The Origins of the Cybermen. Bonus interview with Frazer Hines. Reissues: 9 January 2006 (CD, individual release). 2 August 2012 (CD, in The Lost TV Episodes Collection Five: 1967–1969 boxset)
32	The Underwater Menace	2nd	Anneke Wills	2-CD	BBC Audio	February 2005
Bonus interview with Anneke Wills. Inner CD card can be reversed so that the case's spine will match the style of the earlier BBC Radio Collection releases on a shelf. Reissues: 4 August 2011 (CD, in The Lost TV Episodes Collection Three: 1966–1967 boxset)
14	The Crusade	1st	William Russell	2-CD	BBC Audio	May 2005
Bonus interview with William Russell. Inner CD card can be reversed so that the case's spine will match the style of the earlier BBC Radio Collection releases on a shelf. Reissues: 5 August 2010(CD, The Lost TV Episodes Collection 1 boxset with the bonus interview moved to a separate CD.). 7 March 2019 (CD, in The Lost TV Episodes Collection One 1964-1965 boxset).
39	The Ice Warriors	2nd	Frazer Hines	2-CD	BBC Audio	August 2005
Bonus interview with Frazer Hines (the interview is split into two parts, one part on each disc). Inner CD card can be reversed so that the case's spine will match the style of the earlier BBC Radio Collection releases on a shelf. Reissues: 2 February 2012 (CD, in The Lost TV Episodes Collection Four: 1967 boxset)
8	The Reign of Terror	1st	Carole Ann Ford	2-CD	BBC Audio	February 2006
Bonus interview with Carole Ann Ford. With this release in February 2006, the soundtracks of all 108 of the then missing episodes had been released with linking narration. From this point on, aside from re-releases of stories with lost episodes, stories with all its episodes existing in the TV archives started to be released on audio with linking narration. Reissues: 5 August 2010 (CD, in The Lost TV Episodes Collection One: 1964–1965 boxset) with the bonus interview moved to a separate CD.). 7 March 2019 (CD, in The Lost TV Episodes Collection One 1964-1965 boxset).
37	The Tomb of the Cybermen	2nd	Frazer Hines	2-CD	BBC Audio	May 2006
Bonus interview with Frazer Hines. Reissues: 6 April 2017 (CD, in the Classic TV Adventures box set). 21 April 2018 (2-LP, heavyweight silver vinyl for Record Store Day 2018)
23	The Ark	1st	Peter Purves	2-CD	BBC Audio	August 2006
Bonus interview with Peter Purves. Reissues: 5 September 2013 (CD, in The TV Episodes Collection Six boxset)
52	Doctor Who and the Silurians	3rd	Caroline John	3-CD	BBC Audio	November 2006
Bonus Interview with Caroline John. Released in the Monsters on Earth limited edition tin with The Sea Devils and Warriors of the Deep. Reissues: 7 January 2008 (CD, individual release). 6 April 2017 (CD, in the Classic TV Adventures box set)
62	The Sea Devils	3rd	Katy Manning	2-CD	BBC Audio	November 2006
Bonus Interview with Katy Manning. Released in the Monsters on Earth limited edition tin with Doctor Who and the Silurians and Warriors of the Deep. Reissues: 7 January 2008 (CD, individual release). 6 April 2017 (CD, in the Classic TV Adventures box set)
130	Warriors of the Deep	5th	Janet Fielding	2-CD	BBC Audio	November 2006
Bonus Interview with Janet Fielding. Released in the Monsters on Earth limited edition tin with Doctor Who and the Silurians and The Sea Devils. Reissues: 7 January 2008 (CD, individual release). 5 October 2017 (CD, in the Classic TV Adventures: Collection Two box set)
25	The Gunfighters	1st	Peter Purves	2-CD	BBC Audio	February 2007
Bonus interview with Peter Purves. Also includes a special 10-minute music segment, "The Ballad of the Last Chance Saloon" by Tristram CaryReissues: 5 September 2013 (CD, in The TV Episodes Collection Six boxset)
44	The Dominators	2nd	Wendy Padbury	2-CD	BBC Audio	May 2007
Bonus interview with Wendy Padbury
27	The War Machines	1st	Anneke Wills	2-CD	BBC Audio	August 2007
Bonus interview with Anneke Wills. Reissues: 5 September 2013 (CD, in The TV Episodes Collection Six boxset)
61	The Curse of Peladon	3rd	Katy Manning	2-CD	BBC Audio	November 2007
Bonus interview with Katy Manning. Reissues: 6 April 2017 (CD, in the Classic TV Adventures box set)
73	The Monster of Peladon	3rd	Elisabeth Sladen	2-CD	BBC Audio	March 2008
Bonus interview with Elisabeth Sladen. Reissues: 6 April 2017 (CD, in the Classic TV Adventures box set)
12	The Romans	1st	William Russell	2-CD	BBC Audio	May 2008
Bonus archive radio items that look at the real-life Nero and the life and career of William HartnellReissues: 5 September 2013 (CD, in The TV Episodes Collection Six boxset)
7	The Sensorites	1st	William Russell	2-CD	BBC Audio	July 2008
Bonus interview with William Russell. Reissues: 5 September 2013 (CD, in The TV Episodes Collection Six boxset)
47	The Krotons	2nd	Frazer Hines	2-CD	BBC Audio	November 2008
Bonus interview with Frazer Hines. Reissues: 5 October 2017 (CD, in the Classic TV Adventures: Collection Two box set)
56	The Mind of Evil	3rd	Richard Franklin	2-CD	BBC Audio	February 2009
Bonus interview with Richard Franklin. Reissues: 5 October 2017 (CD, in the Classic TV Adventures: Collection Two box set)
15	The Space Museum	1st	Maureen O'Brien	2-CD	BBC Audio	May 2009
Bonus interview with Maureen O'Brien; this interview was reissued in The Lost TV Episodes Collection One: 1964–1965 boxset. Reissues: 5 September 2013 (CD, in The TV Episodes Collection Six boxset)
53	The Ambassadors of Death	3rd	Caroline John	3-CD	BBC Audio	August 2009
Bonus interview with Caroline John. Reissues: 5 October 2017 (CD, in the Classic TV Adventures: Collection Two box set)
19	"Mission to the Unknown"	1st	Peter Purves	CD	BBC Audio	April 2010
Released on its own as a giveaway with The Daily Telegraph
34	The Macra Terror	2nd	Anneke Wills	2-CD	BBC Audio	February 2012
Remastered with new, more detailed, linking narration. Available only in The Lost TV Episodes Collection Four: 1967 boxset
92	Horror of Fang Rock	4th	Louise Jameson	2-CD	BBC Audio	September 2012
Bonus interview with Louise Jameson. Reissues: 5 October 2017 (CD, in the Classic TV Adventures: Collection Two box set)
99	The Pirate Planet	4th	John Leeson	2-CD	BBC Audio	October 2012
Bonus interview with John Leeson. Reissues: 6 April 2017 (CD, in the Classic TV Adventures box set)
104	Destiny of the Daleks	4th	Lalla Ward	2-CD	BBC Audio	November 2012
Bonus interview with Lalla Ward. Reissues: 6 April 2017 (CD, in the Classic TV Adventures box set)
105	City of Death	4th	Lalla Ward	2-CD	BBC Audio	December 2012
Bonus interview with Lalla Ward. Reissues: 5 October 2017 (CD, in the Classic TV Adventures: Collection Two box set). 21 April 2018 (2-LP, heavyweight translucent green vinyl for Record Store Day 2018
13	The Web Planet	1st	Maureen O'Brien	3-LP	Demon Records	December 2019
Reissued on CD/download by BBC Audio in October 2020.
3	The Edge of Destruction	1st	Carole Ann Ford	LP	Demon Records	April 2024
Bonus interview with Carole Ann Ford. Reissued on CD/download by BBC Audio in May 2024.
11	The Rescue	1st	Maureen O'Brien	LP/CD/Download	BBC Audio	April 2026

== Audio drama ==
=== Doctor Who ===
There have been several original audio dramas produced for Doctor Who, produced for radio and internet broadcast or commercial release.

Title	Doctor	Written by	Format	Company	Original release date
Doctor Who and the Pescatons	4th	Victor Pemberton	LP, Cassette	Decca	July 1976
Reissues: January 1979 (LP & Cassette, World Record Club, Australia). April 1985 (Cassette, London Records). January 1986 (Cassette, Newman Publishing, USA). 1991 (CD & Cassette, Silva Screen Records). October 1993 (Cassette, Polygram). 3 January 2005 (CD with a bonus interview CD with Elisabeth Sladen, BBC Audio). 7 April 2011 (CD in the boxset The BBC Radio Episodes)
Slipback	6th	Eric Saward	Cassette	BBC Audio	November 1988
Released with Genesis of the Daleks (see above). Reissues: 8 January 2001 (CD). 7 April 2011 (CD in the boxset The BBC Radio Episodes)
The Paradise of Death	3rd	Barry Letts	Cassette	BBC Audio	November 1993
Reissues: 6 March 2000 (2-CD). 7 April 2011 (CD in the boxset The BBC Radio Episodes)
The Ghosts of N-Space	3rd	Barry Letts	Cassette	BBC Audio	February 1996
Reissues: 5 June 2000 (3-CD). 7 April 2011 (CD in the boxset The BBC Radio Episodes)
Exploration Earth	4th	Bernard Venables	CD	BBC Audio	July 2001
Released with the CD reissue of Genesis of the Daleks (see above). Reissues: 28 April 2010 (free CD with that day's edition of The Daily Telegraph newspaper). 7 April 2011 (CD in the boxset The BBC Radio Episodes)
Death Comes to Time	7th	Colin Meek	3-CD	BBC Audio	October 2002
Edited/modified version of the webcast. Bonus outtakes and interviews on disc 3. Reissues: 7 April 2003 (Special edition Mp3-CD including the original webcast with illustrations)
Real Time	6th	Gary Russell	2-CD	Big Finish	December 2002
Commissioned, produced by Big Finish for, and webcast on the official BBC Doctor Who website.
Shada	8th	Douglas Adams	2-CD	Big Finish	December 2003
New recording of the incomplete Douglas Adams story, commissioned, produced by Big Finish for, and webcast on the official BBC Doctor Who website.
The Stuff of Nightmares	4th	Paul Magrs	CD	BBC Audio	September 2009
Part of the Hornets' Nest series, but also stands on its own. Reissues: 12 January 2010 (CD in the boxset Hornets' Nest: The Complete Series). 16 July 2015 (CD in the boxset The Nest Cottage Chronicles). 4 April 2019 (CD in the boxset The Nest Cottage Chronicles)
The Dead Shoes	4th	Paul Magrs	CD	BBC Audio	October 2009
Part of the Hornets' Nest series, but also stands on its own. Reissues: 12 January 2010 (CD in the boxset Hornets' Nest: The Complete Series). 16 July 2015 (CD in the boxset The Nest Cottage Chronicles). 4 April 2019 (CD in the boxset The Nest Cottage Chronicles)
The Circus of Doom	4th	Paul Magrs	CD	BBC Audio	November 2009
Part of the Hornets' Nest series, but also stands on its own. Reissues: 12 January 2010 (CD in the boxset Hornets' Nest: The Complete Series). 16 July 2015 (CD in the boxset The Nest Cottage Chronicles). 4 April 2019 (CD in the boxset The Nest Cottage Chronicles)
A Sting in the Tale	4th	Paul Magrs	CD	BBC Audio	December 2009
Part of the Hornets' Nest series, but also stands on its own. Reissues: 12 January 2010 (CD in the boxset Hornets' Nest: The Complete Series). 16 July 2015 (CD in the boxset The Nest Cottage Chronicles). 4 April 2019 (CD in the boxset The Nest Cottage Chronicles)
Hive of Horror	4th	Paul Magrs	CD	BBC Audio	December 2009
Part of the Hornets' Nest series, but also stands on its own. Reissues: 12 January 2010 (CD in the boxset Hornets' Nest: The Complete Series). 16 July 2015 (CD in the boxset The Nest Cottage Chronicles). 4 April 2019 (CD in the boxset The Nest Cottage Chronicles)
The Relics of Time	4th	Paul Magrs	CD	BBC Audio	September 2010
Part of the Demon Quest series, but also stands on its own. Reissues: 6 October 2011 (CD in the boxset Demon Quest: The Complete Series). 16 July 2015 (CD in the boxset The Nest Cottage Chronicles). 4 April 2019 (CD in the boxset The Nest Cottage Chronicles)
The Demon of Paris	4th	Paul Magrs	CD	BBC Audio	October 2010
Part of the Demon Quest series, but also stands on its own. Reissues: 6 October 2011 (CD in the boxset Demon Quest: The Complete Series). 16 July 2015 (CD in the boxset The Nest Cottage Chronicles). 4 April 2019 (CD in the boxset The Nest Cottage Chronicles)
A Shard of Ice	4th	Paul Magrs	CD	BBC Audio	November 2010
Part of the Demon Quest series, but also stands on its own. Reissues: 6 October 2011 (CD in the boxset Demon Quest: The Complete Series). 16 July 2015 (CD in the boxset The Nest Cottage Chronicles). 4 April 2019 (CD in the boxset The Nest Cottage Chronicles)
Starfall	4th	Paul Magrs	CD	BBC Audio	December 2010
Part of the Demon Quest series, but also stands on its own. Reissues: 6 October 2011 (CD in the boxset Demon Quest: The Complete Series). 16 July 2015 (CD in the boxset The Nest Cottage Chronicles). 4 April 2019 (CD in the boxset The Nest Cottage Chronicles)
Sepulchre	4th	Paul Magrs	CD	BBC Audio	December 2010
Part of the Demon Quest series, but also stands on its own. Reissues: 6 October 2011 (CD in the boxset Demon Quest: The Complete Series). 16 July 2015 (CD in the boxset The Nest Cottage Chronicles). 4 April 2019 (CD in the boxset The Nest Cottage Chronicles)
Tsar Wars	4th	Paul Magrs	CD	BBC Audio	September 2011
Part of Serpent Crest series, but also stands on its own.Reissues: 6 September 2012 (CD in the boxset Serpent Crest: The Complete Series). 16 July 2015 (CD in the boxset The Nest Cottage Chronicles). 4 April 2019 (CD in the boxset The Nest Cottage Chronicles)
The Broken Crown	4th	Paul Magrs	CD	BBC Audio	October 2011
Part of Serpent Crest series, but also stands on its own. Reissues: 6 September 2012 (CD in the boxset Serpent Crest: The Complete Series). 16 July 2015 (CD in the boxset The Nest Cottage Chronicles). 4 April 2019 (CD in the boxset The Nest Cottage Chronicles)
Aladdin Time	4th	Paul Magrs	CD	BBC Audio	November 2011
Part of Serpent Crest series, but also stands on its own. Reissues: 6 September 2012 (CD in the boxset Serpent Crest: The Complete Series). 16 July 2015 (CD in the boxset The Nest Cottage Chronicles). 4 April 2019 (CD in the boxset The Nest Cottage Chronicles)
The Hexford Invasion	4th	Paul Magrs	CD	BBC Audio	December 2011
Part of Serpent Crest series, but also stands on its own. Reissues: 6 September 2012 (CD in the boxset Serpent Crest: The Complete Series). 16 July 2015 (CD in the boxset The Nest Cottage Chronicles). 4 April 2019 (CD in the boxset The Nest Cottage Chronicles)
Survivors in Space	4th	Paul Magrs	CD	BBC Audio	December 2011
Part of Serpent Crest series, but also stands on its own. Reissues: 6 September 2012 (CD in the boxset Serpent Crest: The Complete Series). 16 July 2015 (CD in the boxset The Nest Cottage Chronicles). 4 April 2019 (CD in the boxset The Nest Cottage Chronicles)
Redacted	13th	Ella Watts and James Robinson	Podcast	BBC Sounds	17 April 2022
A ten-part audio drama released via BBC Sounds. People are disappearing and a blue box is somehow involved, but no-one can remember The Doctor except for the host of a paranormal conspiracy podcast.

=== Spin-offs ===
==== Torchwood ====
Torchwood has had seven Afternoon Plays, most bridging the gap between Series 2 and Children of Earth.

Title	Written by	Format	Company	Original release date
"Lost Souls"	Joseph Lidster	CD	BBC Audio	September 2008
Bonus "Torchwood: All Access" programme detailing behind the scenes of the television show. Reissues: 8 April 2010 (CD, Torchwood: The Radio Adventures boxset). 1 June 2017 (CD, The Collected Radio Dramas)
"Asylum"	Anita Sullivan	CD	BBC Audio	July 2009
Reissues: 22 September 2009 (CD, Torchwood: The Radio Adventures boxset). 8 April 2010 (CD, Torchwood: The Radio Adventures boxset). 1 June 2017 (CD, The Collected Radio Dramas)
"Golden Age"	James Goss	CD	BBC Audio	August 2009
Reissues: 22 September 2009 (CD, Torchwood: The Radio Adventures boxset). 8 April 2010 (CD, Torchwood: The Radio Adventures boxset). 1 June 2017 (CD, The Collected Radio Dramas)
"The Dead Line"	Phil Ford	CD	BBC Audio	August 2009
Reissues: 22 September 2009 (CD, Torchwood: The Radio Adventures boxset). 8 April 2010 (CD, Torchwood: The Radio Adventures boxset). 1 June 2017 (CD, The Collected Radio Dramas)
The Lost Files: "The Devil and Miss Carew"	Rupert Laight	Download	AudioGO	July 2011
Reissues: 8 September 2011 (CD, Torchwood: The Lost Files boxset). 1 June 2017 (CD, The Collected Radio Dramas)
The Lost Files: "Submission"	Ryan Scott	Download	AudioGO	July 2011
Reissues: 8 September 2011 (CD, Torchwood: The Lost Files boxset). 1 June 2017 (CD, The Collected Radio Dramas)
The Lost Files: "The House of the Dead"	James Goss	Download	AudioGO	July 2011
Reissues: 8 September 2011 (CD, Torchwood: The Lost Files boxset). 1 June 2017 (CD, The Collected Radio Dramas)

==== Adventures in a Pocket Universe ====
Featuring John Leeson as K-9 and Lalla Ward as "The Mistress"

Title	Written by	Format	Company	Original release date
The Choice	Nigel Fairs	CD	BBV	June 1999
The Search	Mark Duncan	CD	BBV	September 1999

==== Zygons ====
Featuring the Zygons

Title	Written by	Format	Company	Original release date
Homeland	Paul Dearing	CD	BBV	August 1999
Absolution	Paul Ebbs	CD	BBV	October 1999
The Barnacled Baby	Anthony Keetch	CD	BBV	June 2001

==== Krynoids ====
Featuring the Krynoids

Title	Written by	Format	Company	Original release date
The Root of All Evil	Lance Parkin	CD	BBV	November 1999
Featuring the Krynoids
The Green Man	Zoltán Déry	CD	BBV	March 2002

==== Sontarans ====
Featuring the Sontarans

Title	Written by	Format	Company	Original release date
Silent Warrior	Peter Grehen	CD	BBV	December 1999
Old Soldiers	Colin Hill & Simon Gerard	CD	BBV	February 2000
Conduct Unbecoming	Gareth Preston	CD	BBV	September 2000

==== Kaldor City ====
A series of audio dramas set in Kaldor City on the unnamed planet featured in the Doctor Who serial The Robots of Death.

Title	Written by	Format	Company	Original release date
Occam's Razor	Alan Stevens & Jim Smith	CD	Magic Bullet Productions	September 2001
Death's Head	Chris Boucher	CD	Magic Bullet Productions	April 2002
Hidden Persuaders	Jim Smith & Fiona Moore	CD	Magic Bullet Productions	November 2002
Taren Capel	Alan Stevens	CD	Magic Bullet Productions	March 2003
Checkmate	Alan Stevens	CD	Magic Bullet Productions	September 2003
Features the Fendahl from the Doctor Who serial Image of the Fendahl.
"The Prisoner"	Alan Stevens & Fiona Moore	CD	MJTV	April 2004
Short play included on the interview CD The Actor Speaks: Paul Darrow
Storm Mine	Daniel O'Mahony	CD	Magic Bullet Productions	December 2004
Features the Fendahl
"Metafiction"	Alan Stevens and Fiona Moore	Download	Magic Bullet Productions	July 2012

==== Faction Paradox ====
Audio dramas featuring the Faction Paradox, a time travelling cult/rebel group/organised crime syndicate originally appearing in the Eighth Doctor Adventures line of Doctor Who novels.

Title	Written by	Format	Company	Original release date
The Eleven Day Empire	Lawrence Miles	CD	BBV	October 2001
The Shadow Play	Lawrence Miles	CD	BBV	October 2001
Featuring the Sontarans.
Sabbath Dei	Lawrence Miles	CD	BBV	February 2003
The Year of the Cat	Lawrence Miles	CD	BBV	April 2003
Movers	Lawrence Miles	CD	BBV	December 2003
A Labyrinth of Histories	Lawrence Miles	CD	BBV	February 2004
Coming to Dust	Lawrence Miles	CD	Magic Bullet Productions	July 2005
True History of Faction Paradox, Vol. I
The Ship of a Billion Years	Lawrence Miles	CD	Magic Bullet Productions	April 2006
True History of Faction Paradox, Vol. II
Body Politic	Lawrence Miles	CD	Magic Bullet Productions	May 2008
True History of Faction Paradox, Vol. III; Features Gabriel Woolf as Sutekh from Pyramids of Mars
Words from Nine Divinities	Lawrence Miles	CD	Magic Bullet Productions	November 2008
True History of Faction Paradox, Vol. IV; Features Gabriel Woolf as Sutekh
Ozymandias	Lawrence Miles	CD	Magic Bullet Productions	June 2009
True History of Faction Paradox, Vol. V; Features Gabriel Woolf as Sutekh
The Judgment of Sutekh	Lawrence Miles	CD	Magic Bullet Productions	November 2009
True History of Faction Paradox, Vol. VI; Features Gabriel Woolf as Sutekh
Eternal Escape	James Hornby	Download	BBV	June 2021
Sabbath and the King	Aristide Twain	Download	BBV	August 2021
The Confession of Brother Signet	Michael Gilroy-Sinclair	Download	BBV	October 2021
Dionus's War: Call Me Ishmael	J.T. Mulholland	Download	BBV	June 2021
Dionus's War: The Healer's Sin	J.T. Mulholland	Download	BBV	July 2021
Dionus's War: Me & My Ghost	Bill Baggs	Download	BBV	October 2021
Hellscape: Lucifer	Trevor Spencer	Download	BBV	January 2022
Hellscape: Lucifer's Sleep	Trevor Spencer	Download	BBV	May 2022
Hellscape: Babylon's Own Personal Hell	Trevor Spencer	Download	BBV	June 2022
Hellscape: Brother's Keeper	Trevor Spencer	Download	BBV	August 2022
Hellscape: Unwanted Guest	Trevor Spencer	Download	BBV	December 2022
Hellscape: Lilith Fades	Trevor Spencer	Download	BBV	December 2022

==== Hellscape ====
Featuring characters from BBV's Faction Paradox series

Title	Written by	Format	Company	Original release date
The Lilium Saga, Acts I-III	Trevor Spencer	Download	BBV	August 2023
The Lilium Saga, Acts IV-VI	Trevor Spencer	Download	BBV	December 2023
Public Trips - Steamboat Mick	Trevor Spencer	Download	Mix'D Bloodz Productions	January 2024
Public Trips - Winnie	Trevor Spencer	Download	Mix'D Bloodz Productions	February 2024
Trial On Venere	Trevor Spencer	Download	Mix'D Bloodz Productions	October 2024
Trapped Feeling	Trevor Spencer	Download	Mix'D Bloodz Productions	September 2025

==== Sleepers ====
Featuring the Sleepers from the Hellscape series

Title	Written by	Format	Company	Original release date
The Beginning	Trevor Spencer	Download	Mix'D Bloodz Productions	July 2024
The Search	Trevor Spencer	Download	Mix'D Bloodz Productions	August 2024
The Showman	Trevor Spencer	Download	Mix'D Bloodz Productions	September 2024
The Sand	Trevor Spencer	Download	Mix'D Bloodz Productions	October 2024

==== The Minister of Chance ====
A series of audio dramas featuring The Minister of Chance from Death Comes to Time.

Title	Written by	Format	Company	Original release date
"The Pointed Hand"	Dan Freeman	Download	Radio Static	February 2011
Prologue
"The Broken World"	Dan Freeman	Download	Radio Static	March 2011
Episode 1
"The Forest Shakes"	Dan Freeman	Download	Radio Static	May 2011
Episode 2
"Paludin Fields"	Dan Freeman	Download	Radio Static	July 2012
Episode 3
"The Tiger"	Dan Freeman	Download	Radio Static	February 2013
Episode 4
"In a Bark on the River Hex"	Dan Freeman	Download	Radio Static	May 2013
Episode 5

==== Erimem ====
Audio dramas adapted from Thebes Publishing's line of Erimem novels featuring the Fifth Doctor companion from Big Finish Productions line of Doctor Who audio plays.

Title	Written by	Format	Company	Original release date
Kerides the Thinker: "Return of the Queen"	Iain McLaughlin and Claire Bartlett	Download	Imagination Theatre	February 2012
Eighth episode of the Kerides the Thinker series, featuring Erimem
My Mate, Erimem	Iain McLaughlin	YouTube	BBV	20 August 2021
The Beast of Stalingrad	Iain McLaughlin	Download	BBV	November 2021
Prime Imperative	Iain McLaughlin	Download	BBV	November 2021
Churchill's Castle	Iain McLaughlin	Download	BBV	November 2021

==== Maker's Wish ====
Featuring the Makers from the Eighth Doctor Adventures novel The Space Age

Title	Written by	Format	Company	Original release date
After Dark - Slalvok	Trevor Spencer and Bill Baggs	Download	BBV	June 2022
Ticket to Ride	Trevor Spencer	Download	BBV	August 2022
After Dark - Babylon	Trevor Spencer	Download	BBV	August 2024

==== Other ====
Title	Written by	Format	Company	Original release date
I Scream	Lance Parkin	CD	BBV	August 2000
Featuring the I from the Eighth Doctor Adventures novel Seeing I
The Rani Reaps the Whirlwind	Pip and Jane Baker	CD	BBV	November 2000
Featuring Kate O'Mara as the Rani
Wirrn: Race Memory	Paul Ebbs	CD	BBV	February 2001
Featuring the Wirrn
In2Minds	Ian Hepburn	CD	BBV	September 2002
Featuring the Rutan Host
The Quality of Mercy	David A. McIntee	CD	BBV	September 2002
Featuring Guy de Carnac from the Virgin New Adventures novel Sanctuary
Doctor Who at the BBC: The Plays	various	2-CD	BBC Audio	September 2006
Contains Regenerations by Daragh Carville, Blue Veils and Golden Sands by Martyn Wade, and Dalek, I Love You by Colin Sharpe. Reissues: 3 October 2013, CD in the box set 50 Years of Doctor Who at the BBC at the BBC
Moths Ate My Doctor Who Scarf	Toby Hadoke	CD	BBC Audio	July 2007
An adaptation of Toby Hadoke's one-man show for BBC7
Whatever Happened to... Susan?	Adrian Mourby	CD	BBC Audio	April 2011
Parody "documentary" from the Whatever Happened to ...? series of radio programmes. Released in the box set The BBC Radio Adventures
Daleks' Invasion Earth 2150 A.D.	Terry Nation, Milton Subotsky, David Whitaker	7-inch EP	Silva Screen Records	April 2011
Side Two of this special Record Store Day release limited to 500 copies features a mini-adventure edited from this film's soundtrack
Single White Who Fan	Jackie Jenkins	Download	Spiteful Puppet	November 2017
Dramatisation of Jackie Jenkins's The Life and Times of Jackie Jenkins column in Doctor Who Magazine
Omega	Mark Griffiths	CD	Cutaway Comics	March 2022
Dramatisation Cutaway Comic's Omega: Vengeance comic series, starring Brian Blessed
Children of the Circus	Kenton Hall based on an idea by Barnaby Eaton-Jones.	CD	AUK Studios	December 2023
Sequel to The Greatest Show in the Galaxy

== Documentaries and non-fiction ==
=== Documentaries ===
Title	Format	Company	Original release date
An Evening with the Doctor	Cassette	Listen for Pleasure	June 1996
A Recording of Jon Pertwee's one-man show Who is Jon Pertwee?
My Life as a Dalek	CD	BBC Audio	November 2003
Presented by Mark Gatiss. Exclusively released in the limited edition Dalek tin with the soundtracks of The Power of the Daleks and The Evil of the Daleks
Doctor Who: The Dalek Conquests	2-CD	BBC Audio	May 2006
Written, directed and narrated by Nicholas Briggs. An original account of the history of the Daleks, from their creation through their attempts at conquering the universe. The discs feature audio clips from the TV series, and short Dalek scenes performed by Briggs.
Doctor Who: The Essential Companion	CD	BBC Audio	November 2010
Audio highlights from Series 5, presented by Alex Price
Doctor Who – The Lost Episodes	CD	BBC Audio	February 2011
First broadcast on Radio 4 as part of the Archive on 4 series in December 2009. Shaun Levy investigates what happened to the missing Doctor Who episodes. Released in The Lost TV Episodes Collection Two: 1965–1966 boxset.

==== Doctor Who at the BBC ====
Collection of documentary programmes, interviews and other items from the BBC archive. A further volume of radio dramas was also released in this series. Project: WHO?, originally issued as a standalone releases, was included in later Doctor Who at the BBC box sets.

Title	Format	Company	Original release date
Doctor Who at the BBC	2-CD	BBC Audio	September 2003
Contains 30 Years, originally broadcast on 20 November 1993 for Doctor Who's 30th anniversary, presented by Nicholas Courtney and a series of radio clips from 1972–2002, presented by Elisabeth Sladen. Reissues: 3 October 2013,CD in the box set 50 Years of Doctor Who at the BBC under the title 30 Years and More
Doctor Who at the BBC Volume 2	2-CD	BBC Audio	September 2004
A variety of BBC Radio and TV clips from 1967–2003, presented by Elisabeth Sladen. Reissues: 3 October 2013,CD in the box set 50 Years of Doctor Who at the BBC under the title In the Hot Seat
Project: WHO?	2-CD	BBC Audio	May 2005
Release of BBC Radio 2 programme narrated by Anthony Head, with behind-the-scenes information on the new series. Contains thirty minutes of previously unreleased material. Originally a standalone release, it was retroactively added to the series in the box set 50 Years of Doctor Who at the BBC, released 3 October 2013.
Doctor Who at the BBC Volume 3	2-CD	BBC Audio	September 2005
Contains BBC TV and Radio items related to Doctor Who from 1974 through 2005, presented by Elisabeth Sladen. Reissues: 3 October 2013,CD in the box set 50 Years of Doctor Who at the BBC under the title Now and Then
The Tenth Doctor	2-CD	BBC Audio	September 2007
Presented by Elisabeth SladenReissues: 3 October 2013, CD in the box set 50 Years of Doctor Who at the BBC
A Legend Reborn	2-CD	BBC Audio	January 2010
Presented by Elisabeth SladenReissues: 3 October 2013, CD in the box set 50 Years of Doctor Who at the BBC
Lost Treasures	CD	AudioGo	October 2013
Presented by Louise JamesonReissues: 3 October 2013,CD in the box set 50 Years of Doctor Who at the BBC
Happy Anniversary	CD	BBC Audio	July 2019
Contains Who is the Doctor? presented by Russell Tovey and a special edition of Graham Norton's Saturday morning BBC Radio 2 show.
Who Are We?	CD	BBC Audio	December 2024
Contains Who Are We?; The Classic Years and Who Are We?: The Modern Era, presented by Jo Whiley and Surviving Doctor Who presented by Toby Hadoke.

=== Interviews ===
Title	Read by	Format	Company	Original release date
The Ultimate Interview	Colin Baker and David Banks	Cassette	Silver Fist	October 1989
Colin and David interview each other during the tour of The Ultimate Adventure. Reissues: November 2004 (CD)
Who's The Real McCoy	Sylvester McCoy	Cassette	Silver Fist	February 1990
Reissues: February 2005 (CD)
Pertwee in Person	Jon Pertwee	Cassette	Silver Fist	July 1990
Reissues: September 2004 (CD)
The Actor Speaks: Elisabeth Sladen	Elisabeth Sladen	CD	MJTV	November 2001
The Actor Speaks: Louise Jameson	Louise Jameson	CD	MJTV	December 2005
Cult Conversations, Volume One	Gareth David-Lloyd, Phil Willmott, and Deborah Watling	CD	Fantom Films	June 2007
Tom Baker at 80	Tom Baker	CD	Big Finish	September 2014

=== Commentaries ===
DVD-style audio commentaries released on CD/download, without the original episode audio. All are moderated by Toby Hadoke unless otherwise indicated.

Title	Format	Company	Original release date
The Web of Fear Commentary	2-CD	Fantom Films	November 2014
Eps. 1,2,4-6: Deborah Watling, Ralph Watson, Derek Martin, John Levene, Sylvia James, and Roger Bunce; Ep. 3: Sue Malden interview
The Enemy of the World Commentary	2-CD	Fantom Films	November 2015
Deborah Watling, Mary Peach, Carmen Munroe, Milton Johns, Bill Lyons, and Sylvia James
The Dæmons Commentary	2-CD	Fantom Films	June 2016
Katy Manning, John Levene, David Simeon, John Owens, Alec Linstead, Terrance Dicks, and Sue Upton
Day of Armageddon Commentaries	2-CD	Fantom Films	June 2016
Galaxy Four: "Airlock" – Donald Tosh, Clive Doig & Brian Hodgson.; The Daleks' Master Plan: "Day of Armageddon" - Donald Tosh & Brian Hodgson.; The Daleks' Master Plan: "Counter Plot" - Peter Purves & David Graham.; The Daleks' Master Plan: "Escape Switch" - Peter Purves & David Graham.; The Celestial Toymaker: "The Final Test" - Peter Purves. Bonus Interview: Jeremy Young.; Bonus disc included with special edition.; Galaxy Four: "Airlock" - Peter Purves.; The Celestial Toymaker: "The Final Test" - Donald Tosh
Remembrance Commentary	2-CD	Fantom Films	August 2016
Pamela Salem, Simon Williams, Karen Gledhill, Andrew Cartmel, and Andrew Morgan,
The Sea Devils Episode One Commentary	Download	Fantom Films	December 2016
Katy Manning and Toby Hadoke
An Unearthly Child Commentary	2-CD	Fantom Films	December 2016
William Russell, Clive Doig, Waris Hussein, Jeremy Young, and Brian Hodgson
Cyber 60s Commentaries	2-CD	Fantom Films	December 2016
The Tomb of the Cybermen: Episodes 3 & 4 – Michael Kilgarriff and Roger Bunce.; The Wheel in Space: Episodes 3 & 6 - Marcia Wheeler and Sylvia James.; The Invasion: Episodes Two & Eight - Wendy Padbury, Sally Faulkner, and Sylvia James.; Bonus disc included with special edition.; The Tenth Planet: Episode 4 - Anneke Wills and Brian Hodgson.; The Moonbase: Episode 4 - John Levene
The Green Death Commentary	2-CD	Fantom Films	May 2017
Katy Manning, Richard Franklin, John Levene, Stewart Bevan, Mitzi McKenzie and Michael E. Briant
Adventures in Time Commentaries	2-CD	Fantom Films	September 2017
The Aztecs - "The Warriors of Death": Ian Cullen.; The Romans - "All Roads Lead to Rome": Maureen O'Brien & Clive Doig.; The Romans: "Conspiracy" - Kay Patrick.; The Crusade - "The Lion": Julian Glover & Brian Hodgson.; The Crusade: "The Wheel of Fortune" - Petra Markham & George Little. Bonus Interview on Marco Polo with William Russell and Clive Doig; Bonus disc included with special edition.; The Crusade: "The Lion' - Maureen O'Brien & William Russell.; The Time Meddler - "The Watcher": Maureen O'Brien
The Claws of Axos Commentary	2-CD	Fantom Films	October 2017
Katy Manning, Richard Franklin, Bernard Holley, Bob Baker, Terrance Dicks, and Michael Ferguson
The Talons of Weng-Chiang Commentary	2-CD	Fantom Films	October 2017
Christopher Benjamin, Trevor Baxter, John Bloomfield, Roger Murray-Leach, and Philip Hinchcliffe, moderated by Nicholas Pegg. Bonus disc includes a 30-minute archive stage interview panel with Christopher Benjamin & Trevor Baxter.
Adventures in Space Commentaries	Fantom Films	October 2017	
The Keys of Marinus: "The Keys of Marinus" - Martin Cort & Peter Stenson.; The Web Planet: "The Centre" - Maureen O'Brien, Richard Martin & Clive Doig.; The Space Museum: "The Dimensions of Time" – Jeremy Bulloch & Peter Craze.; The Space Museum: "The Final Phase" - Jeremy Bulloch & Peter Craze.; The Savages: Episode 1: Kay Patrick & Peter Thomas.; Bonus Interview with Michael E Briant.; Bonus disc included with special edition.; The Rescue: "The Powerful Enemy" - Maureen O'Brien.; The Ark: "The Plague" – Roy Spencer
Earthshock Commentary	2-CD	Fantom Films	December 2017
James Warwick, Clare Clifford, Alec Sabin, Steve Morley, Joan Stribling, and Eric Saward
The Edge of Destruction Commentary	2-CD	Fantom Films	December 2017
William Russell, Carole Ann Ford, Brian Hodgson, Clive Doig, Richard Martin, Robert Shearman, and Jessica Carney, moderated by Toby Hadoke and Nicholas Pegg. Bonus: Marco Polo: "The Roof of the World" Commentary
Survival Commentary	2-CD	Fantom Films	February 2018
Disc 1: Lisa Bowerman, Sakuntala Ramanee, David John, and Will Barton.; Disc 2: Sophie Aldred, Rona Munro, Andrew Cartmel, and Joan Stribling
The Monster Era Commentaries	2-CD	Fantom Films	February 2018
The Faceless Ones: Episode 1: Anneke Wills & Frazer Hines.; The Faceless Ones: Episode 2: Frazer Hines & Brian Hodgson.; The Evil of the Daleks: Episode 2: Frazer Hines, David Tilley & Brian Hodgson.; The Web of Fear: Episode 6: Deborah Watling & Philip Morris.; The Krotons: Episode Four: Frazer Hines & David Tilley.; The Macra Terror: bonus interview: Anneke Wills.; Bonus disc included with special edition.; The Abominable Snowmen: Episode Two: Frazer Hines & Brian Hodgson.; The Space Pirates: Episode Two: George Layton & Roger Bunce.; Fury from the Deep: bonus interview: Deborah Watling.; Missing episodes bonus interview: Philip Morris
Revenge of the Cybermen Commentary	2-CD	Fantom Films	April 2018
Christopher Robbie, David Collings, David Sulkin, Roger Murray-Leach, Philip Hinchcliffe and Michael E. Briant.
The Massacre Commentary	2-CD	Fantom Films	April 2018
Peter Purves, David Weston, Chris Tranchell and Donald Tosh.: Bonus disc included with special edition; The Myth Makers - "Horse of Destruction": Peter Purves & Donald Tosh.; The Savages - Episode 4: Peter Purves.; Bonus interview: Stage panel with Frances White & Delia Linden from 2009
Re.U.N.I.T.ed Commentaries	2-CD	Fantom Films	November 2018
The Ambassadors of Death - Episode 2: Michael Ferguson & Margot Hayhoe.; The Mind of Evil - Episode Two: Katy Manning, John Levene & Richard Franklin.; The Mind of Evil - Episode Five: Katy Manning, John Levene & Richard Franklin.; The Time Monster – Episode Three: Katy Manning & Richard Franklin.; Terror of the Zygons - Part Three: John Levene.; Bonus disc included with special edition; Terror of the Autons - Episodes One and Four.
The Three Doctors Commentary	2-CD	Fantom Films	November 2018
Terrance Dicks, Bob Baker, John Levene, Katy Manning, Laurie Webb, Stephen Thorne, and David Tilley.
The Stones of Blood Commentary	2-CD	Fantom Films	December 2018
John Leeson, Susan Engel, Nicholas McArdle, Shirin Taylor, Carolyn Montagu, and Darrol Blake.
World's End Commentary	2-CD	Fantom Films	December 2018
Carole Ann Ford, Ann Davies, Robert Aldous, David Graham, Peter Badger, Nick Evans, Clive Doig, Spencer Chapman, and Richard Martin. Bonus disc included with special edition: Additional commentaries on the episode "Day of Reckoning" and an archival interview with Bernard Kay and Ann Davies from August 2011.
Mars Attacks!	2-CD	Fantom Films	February 2019
The Ice Warriors - Episode One: Wendy Gifford.; The Seeds of Death - Episodes One and Five: Louise Pajo.; "Empress of Mars" - Richard Ashton & Adele Lynch
Resurrection Commentary	2-CD	Fantom Films	February 2019
Rula Lenska, Jim Findley, Sneh Gupta, William Sleigh, Brian Miller, Roger Davenport, Mike Mungarvan, and Eric Saward. Bonus disc included with special edition: Additional commentaries on Resurrection of the Daleks, Part Four and Frontios, Part Two by Mark Strickson
The Dead Planet Commentary	2-CD	Fantom Films	June 2019
"The Dead Planet": Brian Hodgson & Clive Doig; "The Survivors": Carole Ann Ford & David Graham; "The Escape": David Graham, Clive Doig & Richard Martin; "The Ordeal": William Russell & Richard Martin; "The Rescue": Carole Ann Ford, Richard Martin & Clive Doig; Bonus disc included with special edition: "The Survivors": Robert Shearman; "The Ambush" & "The Expedition": Carole Ann Ford & Virginia Wetherell
Peladon Commentary	2-CD	Fantom Films	June 2019
The Curse of Peladon - "Episode One": Ysanne Churchman; The Curse of Peladon - "Episode Two": Katy Manning & Nick Hobbs; The Curse of Peladon - "Episode Three": Katy Manning, Nick Hobbs & Sylvia James; The Curse of Peladon - "Episode Four": Katy Manning, Sylvia James & Wendy Danvers; The Monster of Peladon - "Part Three" and "Part Four": Nick Hobbs & Marcia Wheeler
City of Death Commentary	2-CD	Fantom Films	November 2019
Julian Glover, David Graham, Doreen James, Catherine Schell & James Goss Nightmare of Eden - "Part Four": Peter Craze & Robert Goodman
Monochrome Magic Commentaries	2-CD	Fantom Films	November 2019
The Space Museum - "The Space Museum": Spencer Chapman; The War Machines - "Episode 4": Margot Hayhoe & Michael Ferguson; The Power of the Daleks bonus interview: Anneke Wills; The Macra Terror "Episode 4": Maureen Lane; The Seeds of Death - "Episode One": Wendy Padbury, Martin Cort & Sylvia James; The Space Pirates - "Episode Two": Wendy Padbury & Frazer Hines; Bonus disc included with special edition: Planet of Giants: Carole Ann Ford and Clive Doig; The Wheel in Space: Wendy Padbury and Frazer Hines
Revelation Commentary	2-CD	Fantom Films	January 2020
Philip Hinchcliffe, Nick Burnell, George Gallaccio, James Burge, Joseph Lidster & John Dorney Bonus disc included with special edition: Additional commentary on Part Two with William Gaunt & Graeme Harper and a bonus interview with Eric Saward.
The Robots of Death Commentary	2-CD	Fantom Films	May 2020
Pamela Salem, David Collings, Gregory de Polnay, Brian Croucher, David Tilley, John Dorney and Joseph Lidster
The Pirate Planet Commentary	2-CD	Fantom Films	May 2020
David Warwick, Rosalind Lloyd, David Sibley and James Goss Bonus disc included with special edition: Additional commentary on Parts Two and Three with John Leeson and Michael Owen Morris
Attack of the Cybermen Commentary	3-CD	Fantom Films	November 2020
David Banks, Michael Kilgarriff, Sarah Berger, Brian Orrell, Ian Marshall-Fisher and Eric Saward
Re.U.N.I.T.ed Volume Two Commentaries	2-CD	Fantom Films	November 2020
The Invasion - "Episode Eight": John Levene; The Daemons - "Episode Five": Stephen Thorne; Day of the Daleks - "Episode One": Katy Manning & Richard Franklin; The Seeds of Doom – "Part Six": Philip Hinchcliffe & George Gallaccio; Battlefield - "Part One": Robert Jezek; Bonus disc included with special edition: The Web of Fear - "Episode 4": Frazer Hines; Invasion of the Dinosaurs - "Part Five" John Levene
Warriors of the Deep Commentary	2-CD	Fantom Films	February 2021
Mark Strickson, Vincent Brimble, Tara Ward, Michael Darbon and Eric Saward
SONTAR-HA! Commentaries	2-CD	Fantom Films	February 2021
The Time Warrior - "Part One": Marcia Wheeler; The Time Warrior - "Part Four": Jeremy Bulloch; The Invasion of Time - "Part One": Chris Tranchell; "A Good Man Goes to War": Dan Starkey & Frances Barber; Bonus disc included with special edition: The Sontaran Experiment : Dan Starkey

== See also ==
- Doctor Who audio productions
- Doctor Who missing episodes
- List of Doctor Who audiobooks
- List of Doctor Who audio plays by Big Finish
  - List of Doctor Who spin off audio plays by Big Finish
- List of Doctor Who music releases
