= The Power of the Daleks =

030 – The Power of the Daleks
- Doctor Who serial
- A tele-snap of the serial's opening shot, featuring the Second Doctor post-"renewal"

Cast
- Doctor: Patrick Troughton – Second Doctor
- Companions: Anneke Wills – Polly; Michael Craze – Ben Jackson
- Others: Bernard Archard – Bragen; Peter Bathurst – Hensell; Robert James – Lesterson; Nicholas Hawtrey – Quinn; Pamela Ann Davy – Janley; Martin King – The Examiner; Edward Kelsey – Resno; Richard Kane – Valmar; Steven Scott – Kebble; Peter Forbes-Robertson, Robert Russell, Robert Luckham – Guards; Gerald Taylor, Kevin Manser, Robert Jewell, John Scott Martin – Daleks; Peter Hawkins – Dalek Voices

Production
- Directed by: Christopher Barry
- Written by: David Whitaker; Dennis Spooner (uncredited)
- Script editor: Gerry Davis
- Produced by: Innes Lloyd
- Music by: Tristram Cary (Note: Re-use of music recorded for The Daleks and The Daleks' Master Plan)
- Production code: EE
- Series: Season 4
- Running time: 6 episodes, 25 minutes each
- Episode(s) missing: All 6 episodes
- First broadcast: 5 November 1966
- Last broadcast: 10 December 1966

Chronology
| ← Preceded by The Tenth Planet | Followed by → The Highlanders |

The Power of the Daleks is the completely missing third serial of the fourth season of the British science fiction television series Doctor Who, which was first broadcast in six weekly parts from 5 November to 10 December 1966. Written by David Whittaker and Dennis Spooner and directed by Christopher Barry, it is notably the first story to star a new actor in the lead role of the Doctor—namely, Patrick Troughton as the Second Doctor, who succeeded original actor William Hartnell.

In this serial, the new Doctor (Troughton) and his travelling companions Polly (Anneke Wills) and Ben (Michael Craze) arrive at an Earth colony on the planet Vulcan. The colony's scientist, Lesterson (Robert James), is experimenting on Daleks recently discovered in a capsule under Vulcan's surface. The Daleks feign loyalty to the colony, but secretly plan to conquer and destroy the humans.

Due to Hartnell's ill health and conflict with the production team, the Doctor's ability to regenerate was written into the series to allow the character to be recast. Troughton and the production team reinterpreted the Doctor as a "cosmic hobo" rather than copy Hartnell's performance. To mitigate potential negative reaction to the recasting, the producers centred Troughton's debut serial on the popular recurring antagonists, the Daleks. The Power of the Daleks was the first Dalek serial not written by their creator Terry Nation due to his commitments on The Baron.

The Power of the Daleks received mixed reception upon its initial broadcast, but retrospective reviews consider it one of the best Dalek stories and among the greatest Doctor Who stories of the 1960s. Although the audio soundtrack, tele-snaps and clips of the serial exist, no full episodes survive due to the BBC's former archival policy. In 2016, an animated reconstruction of The Power of the Daleks was released to coincide with the serial's fiftieth anniversary, with an updated "special edition" following in 2020 with improved animation.

== Plot ==
After regeneration, the new Doctor (Patrick Troughton) regains consciousness and sets the TARDIS in flight, to the confusion of his companions Ben (Michael Craze) and Polly (Anneke Wills). The TARDIS lands on the planet Vulcan, where the Doctor witnesses the murder of an examiner (Martin King) sent to inspect Vulcan's colony. The Doctor and his companions are rescued by colonists, who assume that the Doctor is the examiner. The group are escorted by head of security Bragen (Bernard Archard) to the colony, where they meet the governor Hensell (Peter Bathurst), and his deputy Quinn (Nicholas Hawtrey). Nobody seems to know the exact goal of the examiner's visit, which is years earlier than usual. The Doctor and his companions learn of a two-century-old capsule discovered by the colony's scientist, Lesterson (Robert James). The Doctor discovers two inanimate Daleks inside the capsule; a third is missing.

Lesterson and his assistants Janley (Pamela Ann Davy) and Resno (Edward Kelsey) secretly experiment on the third, mistakenly assuming it is a machine. Lesterson removes its gun stick after Resno is shot. Lesterson presents the reactivated Dalek, which feigns loyalty to the colony. Lesterson subsequently reactivates the other two Daleks and removes their guns. The three Daleks then secretly plan to take over the colony. Quinn, who summoned the examiner, is arrested following Bragen's accusations of sabotage; Bragen is promoted to deputy. Bragen and Janley, secretly members of a rebel faction, conspire to use the Daleks' technology to take control of the colony.

The Doctor's warnings that the Daleks are hostile and secretly reproducing is ignored. He and Ben are arrested by Bragen, revealed to be the examiner's murderer. Polly is kidnapped by the rebels. Bragen reattaches a Dalek's gun stick and induces it to kill Hensell.

Lesterson discovers a secret production line mass-producing Daleks; they are deployed and a violent battle ensues. The Doctor, Quinn, Ben and Polly escape imprisonment and join the struggle, where Lesterson, Janley and many other colonists are killed by the Daleks. The Doctor destroys the Daleks by turning their own power source against them. Bragen is shot by rebel Valmar (Richard Kane), and Quinn becomes the new governor. The Doctor and his companions return to the TARDIS to find a motionless damaged Dalek. As the TARDIS dematerialises, the Dalek's eyestalk moves.

== Production ==
=== Conception and writing ===
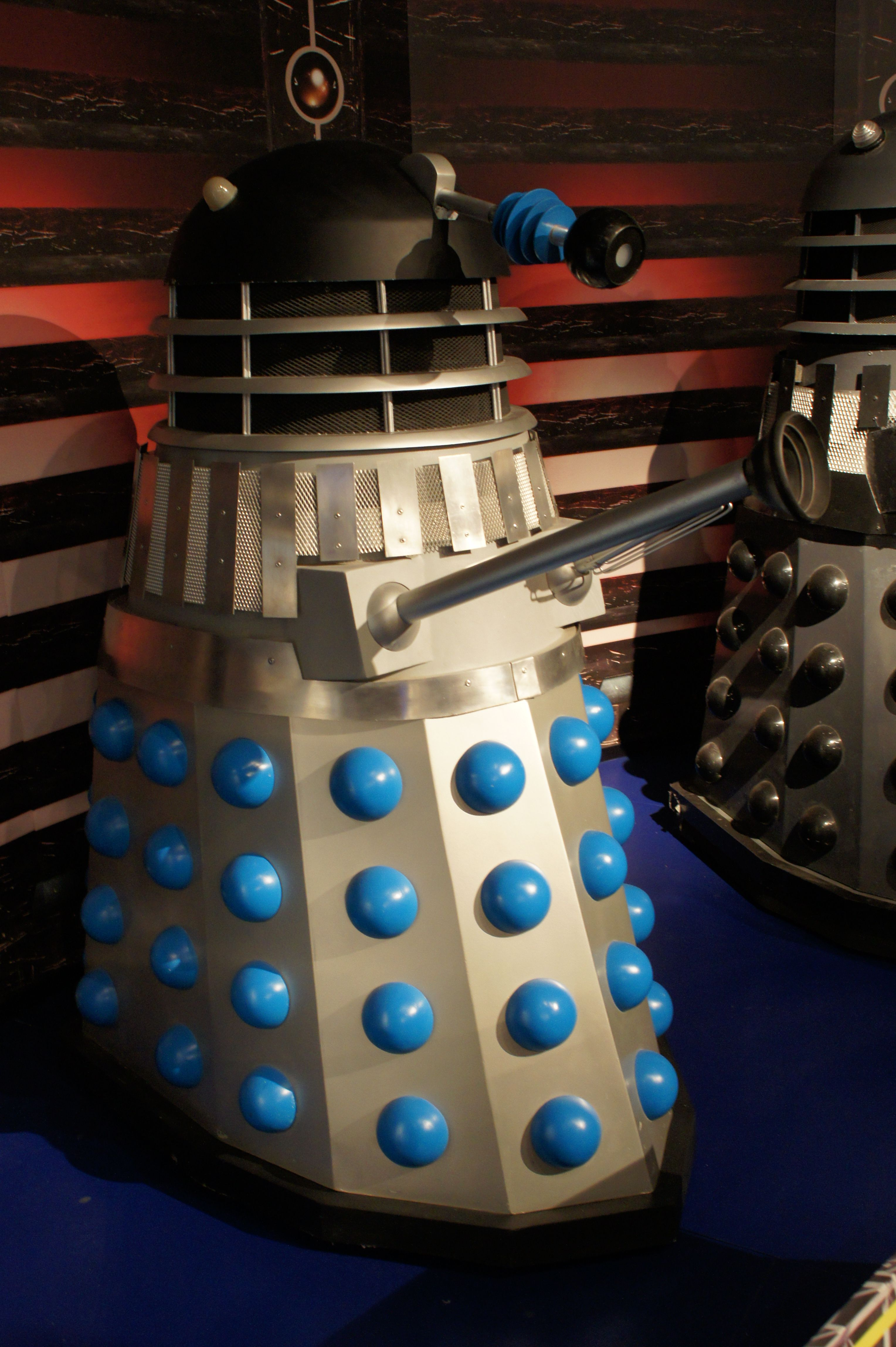
The serial reintroduces a popular enemy of the Doctor, the Daleks

Doctor Who's lead actor William Hartnell was known to be difficult, particularly after the original production team left in 1965; arguments over the direction of the show were common by late 1965 with then-producer John Wiles, and Wiles unsuccessfully tried to replace him. Wiles' successor Innes Lloyd, while having a more positive relationship with Hartnell, advised the actor to leave with approval of the BBC's head of drama series Shaun Sutton. Hartnell decided to leave earlier than contracted on 16 July 1966. BBC memos indicate the Doctor's regeneration was meant to be a "horrifying" metaphysical change. The producers compared it to the hallucinogenic drug LSD, which had the side-effect of "hell and dank horror". Story editor Gerry Davis was inspired by the change in Strange Case of Dr Jekyll and Mr Hyde. Polly and Ben were written as initially distrustful of the Doctor, mirroring the audience's likely reaction.

For Patrick Troughton's debut story as the Doctor, the production team decided to re-introduce the Daleks, last seen in the 1965-66 serial The Daleks' Master Plan. Daleks were already an established enemy, popular with audiences, and as critic John Kenneth Muir has noted, while the Doctor had changed significantly with the introduction of a new lead actor, "the producers took no chances" with a serial centred on such a familiar foe as Daleks. The Daleks also allowed the Doctor and the audience, who knew the Daleks were evil, to be a step ahead in the story than the Vulcan characters, allowing for suspense.

Terry Nation, creator of the Daleks, was too busy with The Baron to write the serial and gave permission for another writer to write the Daleks. The serial was written by David Whitaker, the series' original story editor, with uncredited rewrites by his successor, Dennis Spooner. Nation discussed possibilities of the Daleks' usage with Whitaker. Spooner's rewrites were focused on characterising this new Doctor, which Whitaker initially left vague, and he and Davis were unavailable for rewrites when they were requested by Doctor Who co-creator Sydney Newman. Director Christopher Barry had previously worked with Troughton; he believes this led to him being tapped for the job, his fifth serial for the programme. Working titles for this story included The Destiny of Doctor Who, and the third episode was subtitled Servants of Masters in the rehearsal script. Whitaker delivered the scripts between 25 July and 5 September 1966, with his revisions to the last three episodes completed between 20 and 23 September. Spooner's rewrites for the first two episodes were delivered 13 October.

=== Casting and characters ===
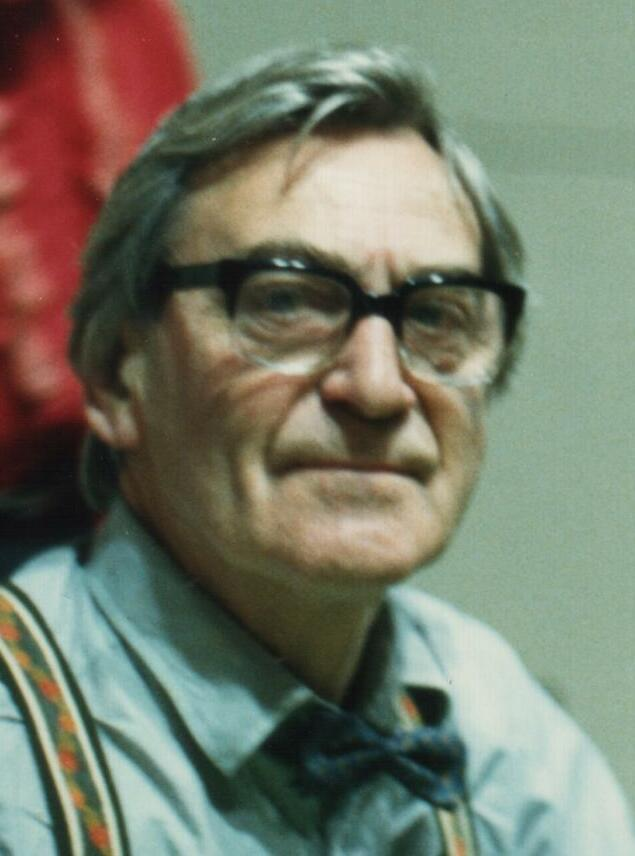
Actor Patrick Troughton makes his debut in this serial in the lead role as the Doctor

Producer Innes Lloyd and the BBC's head of drama serials, Shaun Sutton, had their sights set on character actor Patrick Troughton as the successor for Hartnell; Sutton had been a drama student with Troughton and also directed him. Troughton initially committed to five serials on 2 August 1966, with the press alerted to Hartnell's departure on 5 August, and the story breaking 2 September. This was also when Wills and Craze learned who would be playing Hartnell's successor. Co-creator of Doctor Who, Sydney Newman, described the new Doctor's look and performance as "cosmic hobo." Story editor Gerry Davis attributed the "wild" hair and "worse for wear" clothes as a "legacy" from the Doctor's "metaphysical change." Davis also described the Doctor as "vital and forceful," "a positive man of action" but also capable of behaving "like a skilled chess player," with "humour and wit" and "an overwhelmingly thunderous rage." Troughton preferred the comedic approach to the Doctor. It was Troughton's idea to play the recorder, which he had taught himself. The character's original costuming including a dark Harpo Marx-like wig, but this was received as too silly by his co-stars.

The Dalek voices were recorded by Peter Hawkins on 12 September; this was the first serial he recorded the villains without David Graham. Bernard Archard, who played Bragen, had worked with Barry before. He returned in Pyramids of Mars (1975) as a different character. Peter Bathurst returned in The Claws of Axos (1971). Robert James returned in The Masque of Mandragora (1976). Edward Kelsey had appeared in The Romans (1965) and would return in The Creature from the Pit (1979).

=== Design and filming ===
This was the first Doctor Who serial for designer Derek Dodd. He was inspired by the films Metropolis and Things to Come. The landscape of Vulcan seen through Lesterson's lab window was a photo of a stock steel factory in Sheffield and was inspired by Forbidden Planet. Dry ice and painted backdrops were used to depict Vulcan. To accommodate the Daleks, the capsule set included ramps and rounded doorways they could fit through. The Daleks used in the episode were modified and reassembled from two used in The Daleks (1963-64), one in The Dalek Invasion of Earth (1964), and a "stunt" prop from The Chase (1965). About ten photographic blow-ups on hardboard depicting Daleks were used for the Episode Five cliffhanger. For the Dalek production line, Dodd created a miniature of the set, and the production actually used the BBC's own Dalek toys, although altered to match the ones in the episode. Barry liked to shoot the Daleks with an "over the shoulder" shot, showing their power. The serial also used an inlay shot with a circular mask on the camera to shoot from the Daleks' point-of-view.

Pre-filming, which included the miniature Dalek production line sequence, took place at Ealing Studios from 26 to 28 September 1966. Filming was delayed by one week due to Spooner's rewrites. The episodes were taped for six consecutive Saturdays, beginning on 22 October and finishing 26 November. Some filming and rehearsals overlapped with the following serial, The Highlanders. Anneke Wills was on holiday and therefore does not appear in episode four. Similarly, Michael Craze was absent for episode five, but he still filmed for The Highlanders earlier in the week. Episode 6 was recorded using the 625-line system before the official switchover, although it was telerecorded onto 35mm film, instead of videotape.

To offset costs, Tristram Cary's musical cues were re-used from The Daleks (1963-1964) and The Daleks' Master Plan (1965-1966). Cary was not credited at the end of the first two episodes by mistake. 36 bands of sounds composed by Brian Hodgson at the BBC Radiophonic Workshop were also created for the serial.

=== Continuity ===
The Power of the Daleks is the first Doctor Who serial to discuss the concept of regeneration. The start of the first episode follows on directly from final scene of the preceding serial, The Tenth Planet, in which Doctor is seen transforming from his previous incarnation. In this first episode, the process is not referred to as "regeneration", but the Doctor, prompted by Ben, states that he has been "renewed". The Doctor also remarks that the process is "part of the TARDIS. Without it, I couldn't survive".

As the Doctor recovers from his transition, he rummages in a chest of artefacts and discovers Saladin's dagger, referencing the serial The Crusade (1965). When he looks in a mirror, he briefly sees the image of the First Doctor's face.

== Broadcast ==
| Episode | Title | Run time | Original release date | UK viewers (millions) | Appreciation Index |
|---|---|---|---|---|---|
| 1 | "Episode One"^{†} | 25:43 | 5 November 1966 | 7.9 | 43 |
| 2 | "Episode Two"^{†} | 24:29 | 12 November 1966 | 7.8 | 45 |
| 3 | "Episode Three"^{†} | 23:31 | 19 November 1966 | 7.5 | 44 |
| 4 | "Episode Four"^{†} | 24:23 | 26 November 1966 | 7.8 | 47 |
| 5 | "Episode Five"^{†} | 23:38 | 3 December 1966 | 8.0 | 48 |
| 6 | "Episode Six"^{†} | 23:46 | 10 December 1966 | 7.8 | 47 |

^† Episode is missing

A trailer for the serial was broadcast on 4 November. The Power of the Daleks was screened in weekly instalments from 5 November to 10 December 1966 on BBC1. The serial averaged 7.8 million viewers over its run.

The Power of the Daleks was screened uncensored in Australia on ABC in July and August 1967, and it was repeated in May 1968. It was screened in New Zealand from August to December 1969, and the films were sent to Singapore in 1972.

=== Archival status ===
Prior to the establishment of the Film and Videotape Library, the BBC destroyed old programmes deemed to have no further commercial value. Between early 1972 and 1978, every episode of The Power of the Daleks was destroyed from the BBC's archives. Contemporary viewer Graham Strong recorded the serial's complete audio soundtrack, which has been used in reconstructions. John Cura took tele-snaps of the serial.

Short clips survive from various programmes like Blue Peter, Whicker's World, and Tom Tom, mainly focusing upon the Daleks in Episodes Four, Five, and Six. The serial's trailer was recovered in 2003. In addition, 8mm cine film footage of an Australian broadcast includes extracts from Episodes One and Two. No footage from Episode Three currently exists.

== Reception ==
The serial received mixed reception upon broadcast, with Radio Times receiving letters both positive and negative toward the change in the Doctor. The BBC's Audience Research Report conducted for the third episode included several complaints that the new Doctor was too clownish; a minority of comments were positive or more forgiving. At the BBC Programme Review on 16 November 1966, Troughton received praise as "excellent," although there were weaker cast members.

Episode Two was the subject of a review from Ann Purser of Television Today, who wrote, "I like the new clownish Dr Who... The character in two episodes is already positively developed and underlined." She also praised the frightening Daleks. Writing in The Listener, JC Trewin wrote before Episode Four that he was "not yet fully adapted to Patrick Troughton". After the serial finished, he wrote, "I continue to sign for William Hartnell (our new man on Vulcan lacks the old caressing note), but all is nearly well when we have the Daleks."

Over time The Power of the Daleks gained a reputation of one of the best Dalek stories. In The Discontinuity Guide (1995), Paul Cornell, Martin Day, and Keith Topping wrote of the story, "The first, and most important, reformatting of Doctor Who's central character is carried out with considerable style." In Doctor Who: The Television Companion (1998), David J. Howe, Mark Stammers, and Stephen James Walker wrote that the story's "plotting and dialogue are excellent and the guest characters all very believable and compelling". In 2009, Mark Braxton of Radio Times gave the serial five out of five stars, stating "The Power of the Daleks presents us with an intelligent, logical set of scripts that don't over-reach. He noted that the Daleks were "far from one-dimensional" with the serial deploying a claustrophobic setting and memorable moments that eased the transition between Doctors. In 2016, The A.V. Club's Alasdair Wilkins described the early episodes as "downright glacial" in pacing, even taking into account the episodic nature and change in sensibilities over time. He particularly praised the script. In a review of the animated release, IGN's Scott Collura rated the serial an 8.2 out of 10, writing, "The script, meanwhile, while slow and of its time, offers a tale that is relevant even today: Be careful not to selfishly overreach without paying attention to the needs of those around you." James Whitbrook, writing for io9 in 2016, called the story "one of Doctor Who's best adventures ever." He praised the use of the Daleks in the serial because they "are much, much scarier than just mindless, angry weapons," leading to "one of the most satisfying surprises in all of Doctor Who’s lengthy history" that they were in control the whole time. Paul Mount in Starburst, however, described the story as "fairly mundane" and gave the special edition DVD three out of five stars.

In a 2014 poll representing the first 50 years of Doctor Who, Doctor Who Magazine readers voted The Power of the Daleks as the third best 1960s story and 19th overall, up from 21 in 2009. In 2023, The Daily Telegraph ranked the serial the 41st best Doctor Who story. In the Doctor Who Magazine poll for the 60th anniversary in 2023, The Power of the Daleks was voted the third best story of the Second Doctor's tenure. In 2010, Charlie Jane Anders in io9 listed the cliffhanger to the fourth episode—in which the Dalek production line is revealed—as one of the best Doctor Who cliffhangers of all time. She also ranked the serial as the 39th best story and a "classic" in 2015.

== Commercial releases ==
=== In print ===
The Power of the Daleks
- Author: John Peel
- Cover artist: Alister Pearson
- Series: Doctor Who book: Target novelisations
- Release number: 154
- Publisher: Doctor Who Books
- Publication date: 15 July 1993
- ISBN: 0-426-20390-9

John Peel's novelisation was published by Doctor Who Books, an imprint of Virgin Books, in July 1993. This occurred so late because deals had to be made with the estates of Terry Nation and David Whittaker. Peel used Whitaker's draft scripts to write the novelisation and added expanded details of his own. In 1994, Science Fiction Chronicle's Don D'Ammassa reviewed the novelisation as "competently done and entertaining."

The script of this serial, edited by John McElroy, was published by Titan Books in March 1993.

=== Home media ===
The BBC has given the audio soundtrack of The Power of the Daleks three commercial releases: first, on cassette release with narration by Tom Baker; second, on CD with narration by Anneke Wills; and third, on MP3-CD for the 'Doctor Who: Reconstructed' range, again narrated by Wills and this time including images.

In 2004, all known surviving clips were released on the DVD set Lost in Time. Following this, two more short clips – along with a higher-quality version of one of the extant scenes – were discovered in a 1966 edition of the BBC science series Tomorrow's World; these clips came to light on 11 September 2005 when the relevant section was broadcast as part of an edition of the clip-based nostalgia series Sunday Past Times on BBC Two. They were later included in the documentaries "The Dalek Tapes" (on the DVD of Genesis of the Daleks) and "Now Get out of That" (on the disc containing Terror of the Vervoids, within The Trial of a Time Lord box set).

=== Animated version ===
The BBC commissioned an animated version of the serial in 2016 to mark the 50th anniversary of its original transmission. The animation was produced in black-and-white, to evoke the original 1966 television broadcast, using audio recordings of the original broadcast as a soundtrack, and drawing on film clips and still photographs from the serial. It was directed by Charles Norton, with lead character art by Martin Geraghty, character shading by Adrian Salmon, props by Mike Collins, and background art by Daryl Joyce. Late into production, BBC America began work on a colourised version of the black-and-white animation. In August 2016, the Daily Mirror subsequently revealed that a full animated reconstruction of the serial had been commissioned by the BBC. This was confirmed by the BBC in September 2016.

The animation was released daily on the BBC Store in black-and-white between 5 and 10 November 2016, followed by a colour release of the complete serial on 31 December 2016. In North America, the animation was screened theatrically by Fathom Events on 14 November 2016 and aired on BBC America from 19 November 2016. For the 2020 re-release, the animation was re-composited and some sections were re-animated.

In the UK, the black and white animation was released on DVD on 21 November 2016, and a Blu-ray/DVD bundle containing the black and white and colour versions in limited steelbook packaging was released in February 2017, making it the first 1960s Doctor Who serial to be released on Blu-ray (although not the first live-action one). A North American DVD containing the black and white and colour versions was released on 31 January 2017. They include clips from the original episodes, the CD-ROM's telesnap reconstruction, a 20-minute documentary covering the original production (Servants and Masters), and an audio commentary; additionally, a 5.1 surround mix of the serial was produced alongside a remaster of the original mono recordings.

An updated version of the animation was released on Blu-ray and DVD on 27 July 2020; it also adds newly discovered footage from the original episodes, the narrated cassette version of the serial, two new documentaries, and additional archive content, including an edition of Whicker's World ("I Don't Like My Monsters to Have Oedipus Complexes") and surviving footage of Robin Hood starring Troughton.

== Bibliography ==
- Ainsworth, John, ed. (2016). "The Power of the Daleks, The Highlanders, The Underwater Menace, and The Moonbase". Doctor Who: The Complete History. Vol. 9, no. 34. London: Panini Comics, Hachette Partworks.
- Wright, Mark, ed. (2016). "The Savages, The War Machines, The Smugglers, and The Tenth Planet". Doctor Who: The Complete History. Vol. 8, no. 27. London: Panini Comics, Hachette Partworks. pp. 119–122.
