= Tozer (surname) =

Tozer is a surname commonly believed to have originated in Devon, South West England. It is a reference to the occupation of carding of wool which was originally performed by the use of teasels (Latin carduus), via the Middle English word tōsen, to tease [out]. The surname has variants, including the lesser-known "Tozier" and "Tawzer".

== The Tozers of Moretonhampstead ==
According to the Moretonhampstead History Society, the Tozer family was, by 1332, established at Howton, which was part of the manor of Moreton until it was alienated. A 15th-century record in the Public Record Office (C.1/56/207) records a legal dispute between John and William Tozer over "Houghton in the parish of Moreton".

There are several gravestones and a chest tomb to later members of the Tozer family in the churchyard of Moretonhampstead parish church. The properties of Great Howton and Howton Langhill are also recorded as being in the possession of members of the Tozer family.

== Notable people with the surname ==
- A.W. Tozer (1897–1963), American pastor
- Aaron Tozer (1788–1854), British naval officer
- Aiden Wilson Tozer (1897–1963), American Protestant pastor, preacher and author
- Augustus Edmonds Tozer (1857–1910), English composer and organist
- Ben Tozer (born 1990), English footballer, playing for Wrexham AFC
- William "Bill" Tozer (1882–1955), baseball player
- Bruce Tozer (1926–2021), Australian cricketer
- Claude Tozer (1890–1920), Australian doctor and cricketer
- Dave Tozer, American music producer, songwriter and musician
- Edwin E. Tozer (born 1943), British computer scientist, management consultant, and author
- Elias Tozer (1825–73), Devon journalist, poet and collector of folk stories.
- Elishama Tozer (1741–1790), New York politician
- Faye Tozer (born 1975) English singer-songwriter with the band Steps
- Geoffrey Tozer (1954–2009), Australian pianist
- Henry Tozer (priest) (1602–1650), English priest and academic
- Henry Fanshawe Tozer (1829–1916), English writer, teacher, and traveller
- Horace Tozer (1844–1916), Australian lawyer and politician
- John Tozer (1922–1990), Australian politician
- Joseph Tozer (1881–1955), British actor
- Keith Tozer, American soccer player
- Kira Tozer, Canadian voice actress
- Norman Tozer (1934–2010), British television and radio presenter and reporter
- Solomon Tozer (disappeared 1848), Sergeant of Royal Marines
- Tim Tozer (born 1959), British businessman
- Vivian Tozer (1870–1954), Australian politician
- William Tozer (1829–1899), British clergyman, bishop of Nyasaland
- Phil Tozer - colorectal surgeon
