= Tőzsér =

Tőzsér ([ˈtøːʒeːr]) is a Hungarian surname. Notable people with the surname include:

- Dániel Tőzsér (born 1985), Hungarian football midfielder
- Ilona Tőzsér, Hungarian sprint canoer

== See also ==
- Tozer (surname)
