= Tim Tozer =

British businessman

Timothy David Tozer (born 1959) is a British businessman, and the former managing director of Vauxhall Motors Ltd, also known as General Motors UK Limited.

== Early life ==
He was born in Aldershot, now in the Rushmoor borough of Hampshire. He has a younger sister, Antonia. He is the son of Lt.Col. John Robert Tozer and Penelope Hockley. He grew up in Little Easton, near Great Dunmow Essex. He gained A-levels in Mathematics, Economics and Geography at Sherborne School, Dorset.

He attended Loughborough University from 1977 to 1981, studying Business Studies for a Bachelor of Arts.

== Career ==
=== Rover Group ===
He started his career in September 1981 with what became the Rover Group, working originally in finance before moving into sales. He became Sales Director for the South (UK) region. He left Rover in October 1991 to Join Inchcape plc.

=== Mazda ===
From 1998 to 2001 he was managing director of Mazda Cars (UK) Limited. Mazda has around 130 dealerships across the UK. Since November 2015, Mazda UK has a new headquarters in Kent.

=== Mitsubishi ===
Mitsubishi Motors Europe B.V. (MME) is headquartered in the Netherlands. He was Chief Executive from September 2004 to 2008. Mitsubishi Motors Europe has €370 million a year turnover, and operates in 34 countries.

=== Vauxhall ===
He was appointed chairman and managing director of Vauxhall Motors on 12 May 2014. He resigned on 22 September 2015. Vauxhall UK is headquartered in Luton and has a £4bn turnover with around 5,000 employees and sells around 300,000 vehicles.

=== Allianz ===
In June 2018, Tozer was appointed as CEO of Allianz Partners. He was a director at Allianz Partners UK and Ireland between 2002 and 2004.

== Personal life ==
He married in February 1989 and divorced in June 2009. He lives in North Oxfordshire. He has two sons and a daughter. He has lived in The UK, Aden, West Germany, Singapore, Finland, France and the Netherlands.

== See also ==
- Karl-Thomas Neumann, Chief Executive of General Motors Europe, who replaced Steve Girsky

Business positions
Preceded by Duncan Aldred	Managing Director of Vauxhall Motors; May 2014 - September 2015	Succeeded by Rory Harvey
Preceded by Stefan Jacoby	Chief Executive of Mitsubishi Motors Europe; September 2004 - 2008	Succeeded by Gen Nishina
Preceded by David Heslop	Managing Director of Mazda UK; January 1998 - September 2001	Succeeded by James Muir
