= Tom Tom (TV series) =

British children's TV science series (1965–1970)

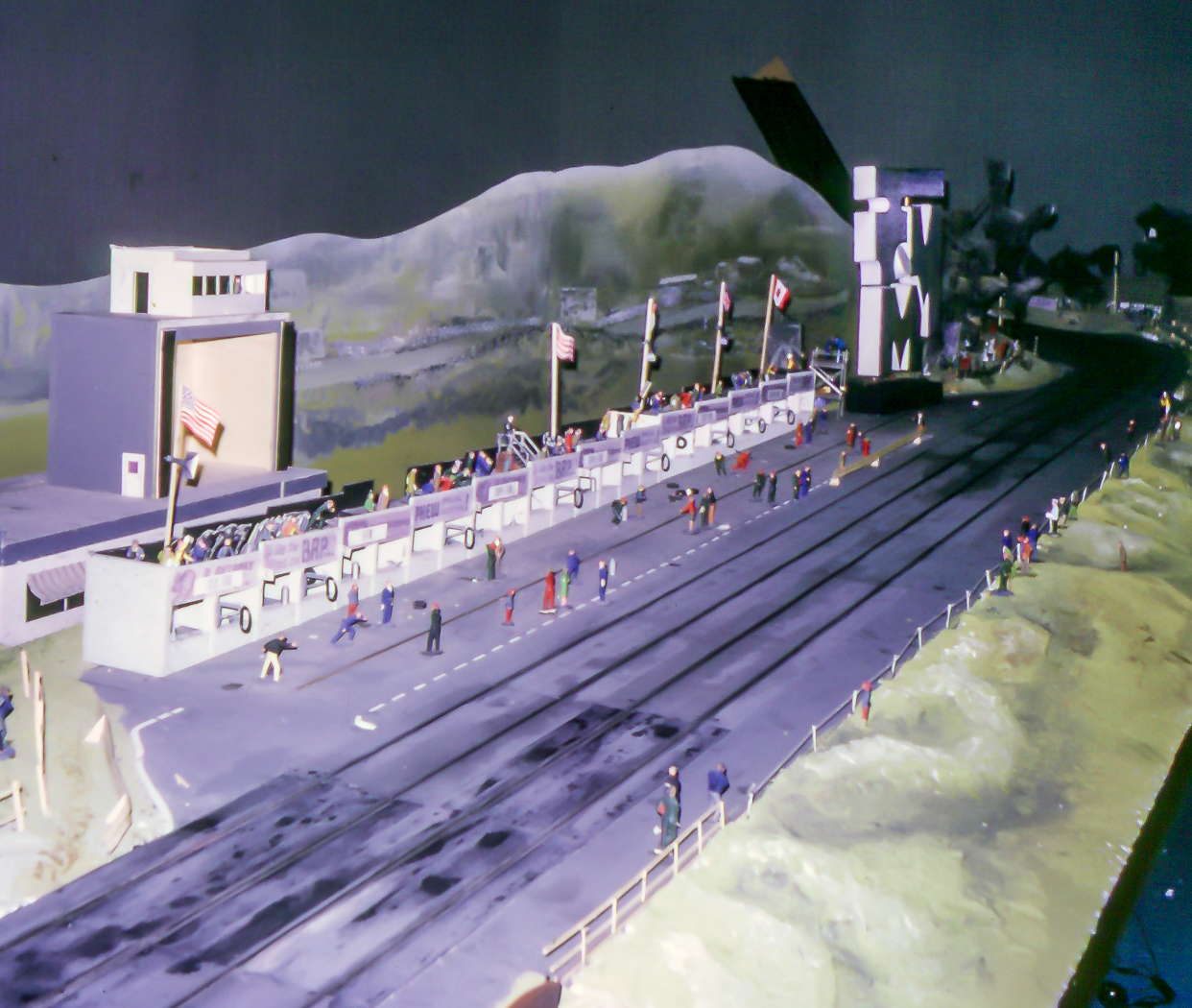
The Tom Tom Racetrack 1968

Tom Tom (1965–1970) was a science-themed children's television series on the BBC, from BBC Bristol. Presented initially by Jeremy Carrad and John Earle, and from July 1968 by Norman Tozer. It later featured three female presenters - Janet Kelly (July–December 1968), future BBC TV newsreader Jan Leeming (1970) and Michele Brown (who later married Gyles Brandreth).

First broadcast on 12 October 1965, the series replaced an earlier title from the same production team, Treasure House (13 October 1964 – 21 July 1965) hosted by Carrad together with a robotic hound named 'Serendipity Dog' (a pun on the Terrytoons character Deputy Dawg). Adopting a more serious tone, Tom-Tom dropped the dog (although the series would later feature its own 'robot' creation, Tobor) and was presented as a cross between Blue Peter and Tomorrow’s World, the Radio Times billing describing it as 'new, unusual, and fascinating stories and items of interest in a modern and changing world.' Carrad presented the new series alongside John Earle. Programmes were a mixture of studio items and filmed reports in the Blue Peter mould.

From 2 July 1968, Tom-Tom was hosted by former ATV London continuity announcer Norman Tozer, with Carrad remaining as part of the presentation team alongside John Earle and Janet Kelly. Motorsport was featured regularly on the series, with Carrad providing filmed reports from International Grand Prix events, and the series also boasted its own slot-car racetrack in the studio. Carrad's final appearance was on 27 May 1969, making his exit via a magician's disappearing cabinet. Tom-Tom returned in the autumn, with Jan Leeming joining the presentation team. The first edition of 1970 looked forward fifty years to the year 2020, and invited viewers to enter a futuristic fashion design competition. The series continued through 1970, with features including a film-making competition (Tozer would later write two books aimed at amateur photographers and film makers). The last edition was broadcast on 4 November 1970.

The original producers of the series were Hugh Duggan and Bob Murray (the show's director). Both left to join ITV in 1968. The designer was Chris Robilliard. From 1968, Lawrence Wade took over as producer. Bob Murray went on to become a well known scientist and psychologist and author of 14 books including the best selling "Creating Optimism" and "Raising an Optimistic Child" (both published by McGraw-Hill)

In April 2017, John Earle, aged 87, was sentenced to four years in prison for sexual abuse of a minor during the late 1950s and early 1960s at Upcott House Preparatory School in Okehampton.
