= Whatever Happened to ...? =

Whatever Happened to ...? is a series of twelve plays broadcast in two series on BBC Radio 4 in 1994 and 1995. They covered the fate of various fictional characters, such as Popeye and Susan Foreman, the granddaughter of the Doctor in Doctor Who. The episode on Dorothy was not transmitted with the rest of the series initially, but was transmitted later and included in the audiobook release in 2025. The writer was Adrian Mourby, who in 1997 published a book called Whatever Happened to ...?: The Ultimate Sequels Book, in a similar vein with the further adventures of Frankenstein's Monster, The Artful Dodger, Snow White, Romeo, Big Bad Wolf, Pinocchio, Man Friday, Jane Eyre, Dorothy Gale from The Wonderful Wizard of Oz, and Jim Hawkins.

== Episodes ==
=== Series one ===
Title	Date of broadcast
Whatever Happened to George?	11 June 1994
Whatever Happened to Popeye?	18 June 1994
Whatever Happened to the Ugly Sisters?	25 June 1994
Whatever Happened to Horace Henry Samuel Quelch?	2 July 1994
Whatever Happened to Susan Foreman?	9 July 1994
Whatever Happened to Little Lord Fauntleroy?	16 July 1994

=== Series two ===
Title	Date of broadcast
Whatever Happened to the Big Bad Wolf?	2 October 1995
Whatever Happened to Pinocchio?	9 October 1995
Whatever Happened to Dorothy?	3 January 1996
Whatever Happened to the Seven Dwarves?	23 October 1995
Whatever Happened to Mowgli?	30 October 1995
Whatever Happened to Postman Pat?	6 November 1995

== Commercial releases ==
Whatever Happened to Susan Foreman? has been released as an extra on the Doctor Who DVD The Dalek Invasion of Earth.

The Radio 4 series starred Sir Michael Hordern, Jane Asher (as Susan), Lesley Philips (as the Big Bad Wolf), Roshan Seth (as Mowgli) Warren Mitchell and James Grout. The first series won Adrian Mourby the Sony Silver Award for Creative Writing on Radio.

All twelve episodes were released digitally 3 July 2025 by BBC Audio.
