= Norman Tozer =

Norman Tozer (13 July 1934 – 14 July 2010) was a freelance reporter who appeared on Tom Tom, a children's programme produced by the BBC in Bristol. Among his other roles, he reported for BBC London News and such BBC Radio 4 programmes as Woman's Hour and You and Yours. He died of cancer at the age of 76.
