= Adrian Mourby =

British opera producer (born 1955)

Adrian Roy Bradshaw Mourby (born 1955) worked for many years as an international opera correspondent and as a producer of operas and BBC dramas. He currently works primarily as a writer and journalist.

== Career ==
Son of Roy Mourby and Peggy, daughter of Charles Edward Bradshaw, a regimental sergeant major, Mourby graduated from the University of Wales, Lampeter and Bristol University Film School. Roy Mourby, who grew up in Wales, was a teacher, and served with the Air Ministry in the Second World War. Mourby's great-grandfather, Tom Mourby, was a former Merchant Navy chief engineer who went on to run gasworks on the Welsh border, later owning one and establishing a family firm later taken over by Mourby's grandfather.

Mourby worked as a producer at the BBC for twelve years, where, amongst other series, he produced a television adaptation of Sir Kingsley Amis' The Old Devils. For these productions, he won numerous national and international awards [Smith/Kline 1982/ Sony 1985/BAFTA Cymru 1991 /Golden Gate 1993/ / BAFTA Cymru 1993 / Celtic Film Festival 1994/ New York Festivals 1994 / Sony 1995], before turning to full-time writing, broadcasting and opera production.

He has published several novels, including We Think the World of Him (1996) The Four of Us (1997) Wishdaughter (2004). He wrote the 1994 BBC Radio 4 series Whatever Happened to ...? about the further adventures of various fictional characters, for which he won the Sony Silver Award for Creative Writing on Radio. In 1997, his book "Whatever Happened to ...?: The Ultimate Sequels" was published with more such tales.

Mourby is a programme essayist working in the UK and Europe. His own opera productions include Semele (Malta 2002) Cosi fan tutte (Oxford 2004) Marriage of Figaro (Blewbury Festival 2006). In 2015 he worked as dramaturg on Wienerstaatsoper's Idomeneo. In 2007 Mourby was awarded the Special Award for Opera Journalism by the Fondazione Festival Pucciniamo, Italy. In 2010 he was one of the finalists for UK Travel Journalist of the Year and in 2013 won the award for Best Travel Article in a Magazine (Italian Tourist Board). Mourby has also written AA guides to Venice, Brussels and Bruges and contributed to various Dorling Kindersley travel guides.

In June 2017 Icon Press published two books based on Mourby's travels round the world. Rooms of One's Own focussed on places where great works of literature were written; its sequel Rooms with a View told the story of 50 grand hotels around the world. Rooms of One's Own was highly commended in the 2018 British Guild of Travel Writers Awards in the Best Narrative Travel Book category.
